= Luge at the 2024 Winter Youth Olympics – Men's doubles =

Men's doubles at the IV Winter Youth Olympic Games
- Venue: Alpensia Sliding Centre
- Dates: 20 January
- Competitors: 24 from 11 nations
- Winning time: 1:34.283

Medalists
1st place, gold medalist(s)		Philipp Brunner; Manuel Weissensteiner	Italy
2nd place, silver medalist(s)		Jānis Gruzdulis-Borovojs; Edens Eduards Čepulis	Latvia
3rd place, bronze medalist(s)		Louis Grünbeck; Maximilian Kührt	Germany

The men's doubles luge at the 2024 Winter Youth Olympics took place on 20 January at the Alpensia Sliding Centre.

== Results ==
The first run was held at 11:10 and the second run at 12:05.

Rank	Bib	Athlete	Country	Run 1	Rank 1	Run 2	Rank 2	Total	Behind
1st place, gold medalist(s)	3	Philipp Brunner; Manuel Weissensteiner	Italy	46.951	1	47.332	2	1:34.283	
2nd place, silver medalist(s)	6	Jānis Gruzdulis-Borovojs; Edens Eduards Čepulis	Latvia	47.383	2	47.247	1	1:34.630	+0.347
3rd place, bronze medalist(s)	8	Louis Grünbeck; Maximilian Kührt	Germany	47.428	3	47.648	3	1:35.076	+0.793
4	11	Johannes Scharnagl; Moritz Schiegl	Austria	47.793	4	48.433	4	1:36.226	+1.943
5	7	Silas Sartor; Liron Raimer	Germany	47.945	5	49.110	6	1:37.055	+2.772
6	4	Bruno Mick; Viktor Varga	Slovakia	48.862	6	48.860	5	1:37.722	+3.439
7	10	Maksym Panchuk; Andrii Muts	Ukraine	48.903	8	49.117	7	1:38.020	+3.737
8	5	Kim Ha-yoon; Bae Jae-seong	South Korea	48.898	7	49.813	9	1:38.711	+4.428
9	9	David Svárovský; Štefan Janák	Czech Republic	50.167	9	50.395	10	1:40.562	+6.279
10	1	Karol Warzybok; Cyprian Dybalski	Poland	52.963	11	49.344	8	1:42.307	+8.024
11	12	Nathan Bivins; Wolfgang Lux	United States	52.650	10	53.482	11	1:46.132	+11.849
	2	Saba Khachidze; Luka Mikaberidze	Georgia	Did not finish		Did not start			
