= Luge at the 2024 Winter Youth Olympics – Men's singles =

Men's singles at the IV Winter Youth Olympic Games
- Venue: Alpensia Sliding Centre
- Dates: 21 January
- Competitors: 22 from 19 nations
- Winning time: 1:32.356

Medalists
1st place, gold medalist(s)		Leon Haselrieder	Italy
2nd place, silver medalist(s)		Paul Socher	Austria
3rd place, bronze medalist(s)		Philipp Brunner	Italy

The men's singles luge at the 2024 Winter Youth Olympics will take place on 21 January at the Alpensia Sliding Centre.

== Results ==
The first run was held at 08:30 and the second run at 09:40.

Rank	Bib	Athlete	Country	Run 1	Rank 1	Run 2	Rank 2	Total	Behind
1st place, gold medalist(s)	1	Leon Haselrieder	Italy	46.294	2	46.062	1	1:32.356	
2nd place, silver medalist(s)	3	Paul Socher	Austria	46.226	1	46.315	2	1:32.541	+0.185
3rd place, bronze medalist(s)	12	Philipp Brunner	Italy	46.653	3	46.588	3	1:33.241	+0.885
4	9	Edvards Marts Markitāns	Latvia	46.809	4	46.612	4	1:33.421	+1.065
5	11	Johannes Scharnagl	Austria	46.815	5	46.789	5	1:33.604	+1.248
6	4	Ola Brandstadmoen	Norway	47.131	6	47.247	=7	1:34.378	+2.022
7	8	Bruno Mick	Slovakia	47.376	7	47.309	9	1:34.685	+2.329
8	13	Bastian van Wouw	Canada	47.450	8	47.247	=7	1:34.697	+2.341
9	6	Silas Sartor	Germany	47.486	10	47.378	10	1:34.864	+2.508
10	5	Vlad Florin Mușei	Romania	47.648	13	47.383	11	1:35.031	+2.675
11	19	Kim Bo-keun	South Korea	47.572	11	47.474	13	1:35.046	+2.690
12	20	Anton Shevchuk	Ukraine	47.642	12	47.410	12	1:35.046	+2.696
13	18	Saba Khachidze	Georgia	47.485	9	47.651	14	1:35.136	+2.780
14	7	Orson Colby	United States	47.973	14	48.141	17	1:36.114	+3.758
15	10	Michał Gancarczyk	Poland	48.047	15	48.117	16	1:36.164	+3.808
16	2	Hannes Röder	Germany	49.402	21	46.956	6	1:36.358	+4.002
17	16	Filip Pavlata	Czech Republic	48.133	16	48.442	18	1:36.575	+4.219
18	21	Miha Vozelj	Slovenia	48.863	19	47.794	15	1:36.657	+4.301
19	22	Wang Qingxiu	China	48.169	17	48.572	19	1:36.741	+4.385
20	15	Thiraphat Sata	Thailand	48.779	18	48.769	20	1:37.548	+5.192
21	17	Angel Stefanov	Bulgaria	49.277	20	49.677	22	1:38.954	+6.598
22	14	Mees van Buren	Netherlands	50.177	22	49.547	21	1:39.724	+7.368
