= Luge at the 2024 Winter Youth Olympics =

Luge at the IV Winter Youth Olympic Games
- Venue: Alpensia Sliding Centre
- Dates: 20–23 January
- Competitors: 100 from 26 nations

Luge at the 2024 Winter Youth Olympics took place from 20 to 23 January 2024 at the Alpensia Sliding Centre, Daegwallyeong-myeon, South Korea.

== Schedule ==
All times are in KST (UTC+9)

Date	Time	Event
20 January	08:30	Women's singles
20 January	11:00	Men's doubles
21 January	08:30	Men's singles
21 January	11:00	Women's doubles
23 January	10:30	Team relay

== Medal summary ==
Rank	Nation	Gold	Silver	Bronze	Total
1	Italy	4	1	1	6
2	Germany	1	0	1	2
3	Austria	0	2	3	5
4	Latvia	0	2	0	2
Totals (4 entries)		5	5	5	15

== Medalists ==
Event	Gold		Silver		Bronze	
Men's singles	Leon Haselrieder; Italy	1:32.356	Paul Socher; Austria	1:32.541	Philipp Brunner; Italy	1:33.241
Women's singles	Antonia Pietschmann; Germany	1:35.774	Alexandra Oberstolz; Italy	1:36.326	Marie Riedl; Austria	1:36.928
Men's doubles	Italy; Philipp Brunner; Manuel Weissensteiner	1:34.283	Latvia; Jānis Gruzdulis-Borovojs; Ēdens Eduards Čepulis	1:34.630	Germany; Louis Grünbeck; Maximilian Kührt	1:35.076
Women's doubles	Italy; Alexandra Oberstolz; Katharina Sofie Kofler	1:36.471	Austria; Marie Riedl; Nina Lerch	1:37.141	Austria; Lina Riedl; Anna Lerch	1:37.378
Team relay	Italy; Alexandra Oberstolz; Leon Haselrieder; Philipp Brunner; Manuel Weissensteiner	2:29.470	Latvia; Margita Sirsniņa; Edvards Marts Markitāns; Jānis Gruzdulis-Borovojs; Ēdens Eduards Čepulis	2:30.299	Austria; Marie Riedl; Paul Socher; Johannes Scharnagl; Moritz Schiegl	2:30.421

== Qualification ==
The top 19 NOCs in singles events and the top 14 NOCs in doubles events in the 2023–24 Youth A World Cup standings after Round 4 will earn a quota spot with the host country automatically one quota per event.

=== Summary ===
This is the quota list based on the Youth A World Cup standings.

NOC	Men's		Women's		Team relay	Total
NOC	Singles	Doubles	Singles	Doubles	Team relay	Total
Austria	2	1	2	2	Yes	9
Bulgaria	1					1
Canada	1		2			3
China	1		1			2
Chinese Taipei	1		1			2
Czech Republic	1	1				3
France			1			1
Georgia	1	1				2
Germany	2	2	2	2	Yes	10
Great Britain			1			1
Ireland			1			1
Italy	2	1	2	1	Yes	7
Latvia	1	1	2	1	Yes	7
Netherlands	1					1
New Zealand			1			1
Norway	1					1
Poland	1	1	2	1	Yes	7
Puerto Rico			1			1
Romania	1	1	2		Yes	5
Slovakia	1	1	1	1	Yes	5
Slovenia	1					1
South Korea	1	1	2		Yes	5
Sweden			1			1
Thailand	1		1			2
Ukraine	1	2	2	1	Yes	9
United States	1	1	2	1	Yes	7
Total: 26 NOCs	23	14	30	10	10	100

=== Eligible NOCs per event ===
Event	Men's singles	Men's doubles	Women's singles	Women's doubles
Host Country	South Korea	South Korea	South Korea	–
2023–24 Youth A World Cup	Italy; Germany; Austria; Latvia; Romania; Slovakia; United States; Norway; Poland; Georgia; Slovenia; Canada; China; Czech Republic; Ukraine; Netherlands; Bulgaria; Thailand; Chinese Taipei	Germany; Italy; Germany; Latvia; Czech Republic; Slovakia; Ukraine; Romania; United States; Georgia; Austria; Ukraine; Poland	Germany; Italy; Austria; Latvia; Canada; United States; Poland; Romania; China; Great Britain; Slovakia; New Zealand; Ukraine; Sweden; France; Puerto Rico; Thailand; Chinese Taipei; Ireland	Germany; Austria; Germany; Italy; Austria; Slovakia; United States; Latvia; Poland; Ukraine
Reallocation	Germany; Italy; Austria	–	Germany; Austria; Italy; Latvia; Romania; United States; Canada; Poland; Ukraine; South Korea	–
