= Skeleton at the 2024 Winter Youth Olympics – Men's =

Men's skeleton at the IV Winter Youth Olympic Games
- Venue: Alpensia Sliding Centre
- Dates: 23 January
- Competitors: 20 from 12 nations
- Winning time: 1:44.66

Medalists
1st place, gold medalist(s)		Emīls Indriksons	Latvia
2nd place, silver medalist(s)		Yaroslav Lavreniuk	Ukraine
3rd place, bronze medalist(s)		Shin Yeon-su	South Korea

The men's skeleton event at the 2024 Winter Youth Olympics took place on 23 January at the Alpensia Sliding Centre.

== Results ==
The first run was held at 17:30 and the second run at 18:30.

Rank	Bib	Athlete	Country	Run 1	Rank 1	Run 2	Rank 2	Total	Behind
1st place, gold medalist(s)	3	Emīls Indriksons	Latvia	52.40	1	52.26	1	1:44.66	
2nd place, silver medalist(s)	2	Yaroslav Lavreniuk	Ukraine	52.89	3	52.78	2	1:45.67	+1.01
3rd place, bronze medalist(s)	1	Shin Yeon-su	South Korea	52.85	2	53.20	4	1:46.05	+1.39
4	5	Dāvis Valdovskis	Latvia	53.06	5	53.10	3	1:46.16	+1.50
5	7	Emil Schäfer	Germany	53.05	4	54.02	7	1:47.07	+2.41
6	6	Theodor Buligescu	Romania	53.69	6	53.47	5	1:47.16	+2.50
7	8	Vinzenz Rosenberg	Germany	54.16	8	53.59	6	1:47.75	+3.09
8	4	Luca Horațiu Ungureanu	Romania	54.07	7	54.65	9	1:48.72	+4.06
9	15	Sander de Haan	Netherlands	54.51	9	54.74	10	1:49.25	+4.59
10	17	Eduardo Henke Strapasson	Brazil	55.00	11	54.94	11	1:49.94	+5.28
11	19	Felix de Wit	Netherlands	55.63	14	54.42	8	1:50.05	+5.39
12	10	Daniel Pedersen	Denmark	55.56	12	55.38	12	1:50.94	+6.28
13	9	Peter Jedinák	Slovakia	54.60	10	56.44	14	1:51.04	+6.38
14	13	Noah Park	United States	55.62	13	56.05	13	1:51.67	+7.01
15	18	Lazar Mikić	Serbia	56.07	16	56.46	15	1:52.53	+7.87
16	20	Bogdan Despotović	Serbia	56.15	17	56.90	18	1:53.05	+8.39
17	16	Tomás Palmezano	Colombia	56.53	18	56.81	17	1:53.34	+8.68
18	11	Baden Park	United States	55.96	15	57.47	20	1:53.43	+8.77
19	12	Cauê Duarte Miota Gonçalves	Brazil	57.21	19	57.10	19	1:54.31	+9.65
20	14	Vladyslav Klymenko	Ukraine	58.08	20	56.49	16	1:54.57	+9.91
