= Qatar at the 2024 Winter Youth Olympics =

- Flag of Qatar
- IOC code: QAT
- NOC: Qatar Olympic Committee

in Gangwon, South Korea 19 January 2024 – 1 February 2024
- Competitors: 2 in 1 sport
- Flag bearers (opening): Mohammed Alnaimi & Aldana Al-Fahad
- Flag bearer (closing): TBD
- Medals: Gold 0 Silver 0 Bronze 0 Total 0

Winter Youth Olympics appearances
- 2012; 2016; 2020; 2024

Qatar is scheduled to compete at the 2024 Winter Youth Olympics in Gangwon, South Korea, from January 19 to February 1, 2024. This will be Qatar's second appearance at the Winter Youth Olympic Games, having debuted at the last edition of the games in 2020.

The Qatari team consisted of two athletes (one per gender) competing in curling. Curlers Mohammed Alnaimi and Aldana Al-Fahad were the country's flagbearers during the opening ceremony.

== Competitors ==
The following is the list of number of competitors (per gender) participating at the games per sport/discipline.

Sport	Men	Women	Total
Curling	1	1	2
Total	1	1	2

== Curling ==
Qatar qualified a mixed doubles pair for a total of two athletes (one per gender). They were the only eligible nation from the West Asia region.

Summary

Team	Event	Group Stage						Quarterfinal	Semifinal	Final / BM	
Team	Event	Opposition Score	Opposition Score	Opposition Score	Opposition Score	Opposition Score	Rank	Opposition Score	Opposition Score	Opposition Score	Rank
Aldana Al-Fahad; Mohammed Alnaimi	Mixed doubles	Norway; L 0–15	United States; L 1–13	Slovenia; L 4–12	Sweden; L 1–13	Ukraine; L 8–12	6	Did not advance			23

=== Mixed doubles ===
Group B	W	L	W–L	DSC
United States	5	0	–	61.18
Sweden	4	1	–	78.69
Norway	3	2	–	34.37
Slovenia	2	3	–	112.84
Ukraine	1	4	–	74.81
Qatar	0	5	–	155.39

Round robin

Draw 3

Saturday, January 27, 14:00

Sheet A	1	2	3	4	5	6	7	8	Final
Norway (Hausstaetter / Svorkmo Lundberg) 🔨	3	2	1	3	4	2	X	X	15
Qatar (Al-Fahad / Alnaimi)	0	0	0	0	0	0	X	X	0

Draw 6

Sunday, January 28, 14:00

Sheet D	1	2	3	4	5	6	7	8	Final
United States (Wendling / Paral) 🔨	3	0	3	2	1	3	1	X	13
Qatar (Al-Fahad / Alnaimi)	0	1	0	0	0	0	0	X	1

Draw 10

Monday, January 29, 18:00

Sheet C	1	2	3	4	5	6	7	8	Final
Qatar (Al-Fahad / Alnaimi) 🔨	0	2	0	0	2	0	0	X	4
Slovenia (Kavčič / Omerzel)	3	0	4	1	0	1	3	X	12

Draw 12

Tuesday, January 30, 14:00

Sheet B	1	2	3	4	5	6	7	8	Final
Qatar (Al-Fahad / Alnaimi)	0	0	0	1	0	0	X	X	1
Sweden (Roxin / Meyerson) 🔨	2	2	2	0	3	4	X	X	13

Draw 14

Wednesday, January 31, 9:00

Sheet C	1	2	3	4	5	6	7	8	Final
Ukraine (Lytvynenko / Shlyk) 🔨	0	4	0	5	2	0	0	1	12
Qatar (Al-Fahad / Alnaimi)	3	0	3	0	0	1	1	0	8

== See also ==
- Qatar at the 2024 Summer Olympics
