= Speed skating at the 2024 Winter Youth Olympics – Men's mass start =

Men's mass start at the IV Winter Youth Olympic Games
- Venue: Gangneung Oval
- Date: 26 January
- Competitors: 31 from 18 nations
- Winning points: 30

Medalists
1st place, gold medalist(s)		Finn Sonnekalb	Germany
2nd place, silver medalist(s)		Pan Baoshuo	China
3rd place, bronze medalist(s)		Eirik Andersen	Norway

The men's mass start speed skating competition of the 2024 Winter Youth Olympics was held at the Gangneung Oval on 26 January 2024.

== Results ==
=== Semifinals ===
The semifinals were started at 12:11.

Rank	Heat	Name	Country	Laps	Points				Time	Notes
Rank	Heat	Name	Country	Laps	S1	S2	S3	Total	Time	Notes
1	1	Finn Sonnekalb	Germany	10			30	30	5:29.67	Q
2	1	Eirik Andersen	Norway	10	1	2	20	23	5:31.270	Q
3	1	Geophrey Coenraad	Netherlands	10			10	10	5:31.272	Q
4	1	Liam Kitchel	United States	10		3	4	7	5:31.41	Q
5	1	Zhang Wanli	China	10	3			3	5:42.36	Q
6	1	Takumi Murashita	Japan	10			2	2	5:31.93	Q
7	1	Shin Seo-nung	South Korea	10		1	1	2	5:32.06	Q
8	1	Ruslan Zhanadilov	Kazakhstan	10	2			2	5:36.69	Q
9	1	Nevio Gross	Switzerland	10				0	5:33.59	
10	1	Lorenzo Minari	Italy	10				0	5:36.52	
11	1	Manuel Piteira	Portugal	10				0	5:36.62	
12	1	Szymon Hostyński	Poland	10				0	5:37.52	
13	1	Vlad Popa	Romania	10				0	5:39.19	
14	1	Christopher López Osorio	Spain	10				0	5:50.08	
15	1	Eeka Rintala	Finland	10				0	5:58.86	
1	2	Heo Se-ok	South Korea	10			30	30	6:19.01	Q
2	2	Miika Johan Klevstuen	Norway	10	3		20	23	6:21.04	Q
3	2	Sergio Álvarez Fernandez	Spain	10		2	10	12	6:21.16	Q
4	2	Tudor Debu	Romania	10			4	4	6:21.36	Q
5	2	Pan Baoshuo	China	10	2	1		3	6:26.84	Q
6	2	John Bernardi	Italy	10		3		3	6:26.86	Q
7	2	Leo Huber	Germany	10			2	2	6:21.82	Q
8	2	Gustavs Vācietis	Latvia	10			1	1	6:21.98	Q
9	2	Mikhail Matryukhin	Kazakhstan	10	1			1	6:22.65	
10	2	Krzysztof Galach	Poland	10				0	6:23.28	
11	2	Paul Wörle	Austria	10				0	6:25.30	
12	2	Martim Vieira	Portugal	10				0	6:25.82	
13	2	Sem Spruit	Netherlands	10				0	6:28.94	ADV
	2	Sota Kubo	Japan						DQ	
	2	Sten Talumaa	Estonia						DQ	
	2	Max Weber	United States						DQ	

=== Final ===
The final was started at 13:27.

Rank	Name	Country	Laps	Points				Time	Notes
Rank	Name	Country	Laps	S1	S2	S3	Total	Time	Notes
1	Finn Sonnekalb	Germany	10			30	30	5:30.07	
2	Pan Baoshuo	China	10	1	1	20	22	5:30.12	
3	Eirik Andersen	Norway	10			10	10	5:30.17	
4	Takumi Murashita	Japan	10			4	4	5:30.92	
5	Zhang Wanli	China	10	2	2		4	5:50.53	
6	Sem Spruit	Netherlands	10		3		3	5:31.74	
7	Leo Huber	Germany	10	3			3	5:47.51	
8	Sergio Álvarez Fernandez	Spain	10			2	2	5:30.99	
9	Heo Se-ok	South Korea	10			1	1	5:31.29	
10	John Bernardi	Italy	10				0	5:31.79	
11	Ruslan Zhanadilov	Kazakhstan	10				0	5:31.80	
12	Miika Johan Klevstuen	Norway	10				0	5:31.86	
13	Geophrey Coenraad	Netherlands	10				0	5:31.96	
14	Liam Kitchel	United States	10				0	5:32.05	
15	Shin Seo-nung	South Korea	10				0	5:32.25	
16	Gustavs Vācietis	Latvia	10				0	5:41.02	
17	Tudor Debu	Romania	10				0	5:41.33	
