= Norway at the 2024 Winter Youth Olympics =

- Flag of Norway
- IOC code: NOR
- NOC: Norwegian Olympic Committee

in Gangwon, South Korea 19 January 2024 – 1 February 2024
- Competitors: 48 in 9 sports
- Flag bearers (opening): Ola Brandstadmoen & Julie Kvelvane
- Flag bearer (closing): TBD
- Medals Ranked 23rd: Gold 0 Silver 4 Bronze 3 Total 7

Winter Youth Olympics appearances
- 2012; 2016; 2020; 2024

Norway is scheduled to compete at the 2024 Winter Youth Olympics in Gangwon, South Korea, from January 19 to February 1, 2024. This will be Norway's fourth appearance at the Winter Youth Olympic Games, having competed at every Games since the inaugural edition in 2012.

The Norwegian team consisted of 48 athletes competing in nine sports. Luger Ola Brandstadmoen and biathlete Julie Kvelvane were the country's flagbearers during the opening ceremony.

== Competitors ==
The following is the list of number of competitors (per gender) participating at the games per sport/discipline.

Sport	Men	Women	Total
Biathlon	4	4	8
Curling	3	3	6
Freestyle skiing	2	0	2
Ice hockey	0	18	18
Luge	1	0	1
Nordic combined	2	2	4
Ski jumping	2	2	4
Snowboarding	1	0	1
Speed skating	2	2	4
Total	17	31	48

== Medalists ==
Medal	Name	Sport	Event	Date
Silver	Storm Veitsle	Biathlon	Men's individual	20 January
Silver	Kjersti Græsli; Oddvar Gunnerød; Ingvild Synnøve Midtskogen; Mats Strandbråten	Ski jumping	Mixed team normal hill	21 January
Silver	Miika Johan Klevstuen	Speed skating	Men's 500 metres	22 January
Silver	Tov Røysland	Biathlon	Men's sprint	23 January
Bronze	Ingvild Synnøve Midtskogen	Ski jumping	Women's individual normal hill	20 January
Bronze	Storm Veitsle; Eiril Nordbø	Biathlon	Single mixed relay	21 January
Bronze	Eirik Andersen	Speed skating	Men's mass start	26 January

== Biathlon ==
Norway qualified eight biathletes (four per gender).

Men

Athlete	Event	Time	Misses	Rank
Ole Gebhardt	Sprint	25:49.4	6 (4+2)	70
Ole Gebhardt	Individual	45:54.4	6 (1+0+3+2)	22
Sigurd Lehn	Sprint	23:42.3	5 (1+4)	26
Sigurd Lehn	Individual	48:38.9	9 (1+4+0+4)	47
Tov Røysland	Sprint	21:29.5	1 (0+1)	2nd place, silver medalist(s)
Tov Røysland	Individual	43:51.8	4 (0+1+1+2)	6
Storm Veitsle	Sprint	23:03.3	3 (2+1)	15
Storm Veitsle	Individual	42:25.5	3 (2+0+1+0)	2nd place, silver medalist(s)

Women

Athlete	Event	Time	Misses	Rank
Marie Flå	Sprint	22:25.2	3 (2+1)	26
Marie Flå	Individual	46:29.5	9 (2+3+1+3)	63
Julie Kvelvane	Sprint	21:07.6	4 (1+3)	6
Julie Kvelvane	Individual	43:12.1	9 (3+3+3+0)	32
Eiril Nordbø	Sprint	22:04.0	4 (0+4)	21
Eiril Nordbø	Individual	38:40.1	3 (1+0+1+1)	6
Sara Tronrud	Sprint	22:02.9	3 (2+1)	20
Sara Tronrud	Individual	44:29.5	8 (2+1+1+4)	50

Mixed

Athletes	Event	Time	Misses	Rank
Eiril Nordbø; Storm Veitsle	Single mixed relay	44:58.5	1+9	3rd place, bronze medalist(s)
Sara Tronrud; Julie Kvelvane; Sigurd Lehn; Tov Røysland	Mixed relay	1:18:50.3	5+13	4

== Curling ==
Norway qualified a mixed team and mixed doubles pair for a total of six athletes.

Summary

Team	Event	Group Stage								Quarterfinal	Semifinal	Final / BM	
Team	Event	Opposition Score	Opposition Score	Opposition Score	Opposition Score	Opposition Score	Opposition Score	Opposition Score	Rank	Opposition Score	Opposition Score	Opposition Score	Rank
Alexander Johansen; Torstein Hoeiholt Vågsnes; Lydia Hågensen; Melina Troean	Mixed team	United States; L 3–8	Sweden; L 7–10	Nigeria; W 21–0	China; L 4–11	Turkey; W 5–0	New Zealand; W 5–2	Japan; L 4–8	5	Did not advance			9
Sylvi Iines Hausstaetter; Sondre Svorkmo Lundberg	Mixed doubles	Sweden; L 6–7	Qatar; W 15–0	Ukraine; W 7–2	United States; L 3–8	Slovenia; W 14–4	—N/a		3	Did not advance			9

=== Mixed team ===
Group A	Skip	W	L	W–L	PF	PA	EW	EL	BE	SE	DSC
China	Li Zetai	6	1	1–0	65	25	28	17	0	12	59.04
United States	Kenna Ponzio	6	1	0–1	68	26	31	16	1	15	51.38
Japan	Kaito Fujii	5	2	1–0	64	26	27	17	2	11	39.53
Sweden	Vilmer Nygren	5	2	0–1	55	42	27	19	5	10	58.05
Norway	Alexander Johansen	3	4	–	49	39	25	19	2	11	65.33
Turkey	Muhammed Taha Zenit	2	5	–	41	40	16	26	5	5	82.17
New Zealand	Jed Nevill	1	6	–	27	44	18	23	3	6	86.52
Nigeria	Goodnews Charles	0	7	–	6	133	4	39	1	0	199.60

Round robin

Draw 1

Saturday, January 20, 10:00

Sheet A	1	2	3	4	5	6	7	8	Final
United States (Ponzio) 🔨	0	2	0	1	0	3	1	1	8
Norway (Johansen)	0	0	1	0	2	0	0	0	3

Draw 2

Saturday, January 20, 18:00

Sheet B	1	2	3	4	5	6	7	8	Final
Norway (Johansen)	0	2	1	0	2	0	2	0	7
Sweden (Nygren) 🔨	3	0	0	3	0	3	0	1	10

Draw 3

Sunday, January 21, 14:00

Sheet C	1	2	3	4	5	6	7	8	Final
Nigeria (Charles)	0	0	0	0	0	0	X	X	0
Norway (Johansen) 🔨	2	5	4	6	2	2	X	X	21

Draw 4

Monday, January 22, 10:00

Sheet D	1	2	3	4	5	6	7	8	Final
China (Li) 🔨	2	0	3	0	4	0	2	X	11
Norway (Johansen)	0	1	0	2	0	1	0	X	4

Draw 5

Monday, January 22, 18:00

Sheet B	1	2	3	4	5	6	7	8	Final
Turkey (Zenit)	0	0	0	0	0	0	0	X	0
Norway (Johansen) 🔨	0	2	0	0	1	1	1	X	5

Draw 6

Tuesday, January 23, 14:00

Sheet D	1	2	3	4	5	6	7	8	Final
Norway (Johansen) 🔨	0	3	0	1	1	0	0	X	5
New Zealand (Nevill)	0	0	0	0	0	1	1	X	2

Draw 7

Wednesday, January 24, 9:00

Sheet C	1	2	3	4	5	6	7	8	Final
Norway (Johansen) 🔨	0	1	0	2	0	1	0	X	4
Japan (Fujii)	1	0	1	0	2	0	4	X	8

=== Mixed doubles ===
Group B	W	L	W–L	DSC
United States	5	0	–	61.18
Sweden	4	1	–	78.69
Norway	3	2	–	34.37
Slovenia	2	3	–	112.84
Ukraine	1	4	–	74.81
Qatar	0	5	–	155.39

Round robin

Draw 1

Friday, January 26, 18:00

Sheet B	1	2	3	4	5	6	7	8	Final
Sweden (Roxin / Meyerson)	0	0	0	1	4	1	0	1	7
Norway (Hausstaetter / Svorkmo Lundberg) 🔨	1	1	1	0	0	0	3	0	6

Draw 3

Saturday, January 27, 14:00

Sheet A	1	2	3	4	5	6	7	8	Final
Norway (Hausstaetter / Svorkmo Lundberg) 🔨	3	2	1	3	4	2	X	X	15
Qatar (Al-Fahad / Alnaimi)	0	0	0	0	0	0	X	X	0

Draw 5

Sunday, January 28, 10:00

Sheet D	1	2	3	4	5	6	7	8	Final
Ukraine (Lytvynenko / Shlyk) 🔨	0	0	0	1	0	0	1	X	2
Norway (Hausstaetter / Svorkmo Lundberg)	1	2	2	0	1	1	0	X	7

Draw 10

Monday, January 29, 18:00

Sheet B	1	2	3	4	5	6	7	8	Final
Norway (Hausstaetter / Svorkmo Lundberg) 🔨	0	1	1	0	0	1	0	X	3
United States (Wendling / Paral)	1	0	0	2	4	0	1	X	8

Draw 12

Tuesday, January 30, 14:00

Sheet C	1	2	3	4	5	6	7	8	Final
Slovenia (Kavčič / Omerzel)	0	3	0	0	1	0	X	X	4
Norway (Hausstaetter / Svorkmo Lundberg) 🔨	4	0	3	2	0	5	X	X	14

== Freestyle skiing ==
Halfpipe, Slopestyle & Big Air

Athlete	Event	Qualification				Final				
Athlete	Event	Run 1	Run 2	Best	Rank	Run 1	Run 2	Run 3	Best	Rank
Theodor Skarpnord	Men's big air	27.50	85.00	85.00	6 Q	41.50	63.00	64.50	127.50	6
Theodor Skarpnord	Men's slopestyle	55.75	2.50	55.75	14	Did not advance				
Filip Stene-Johansen	Men's big air	70.50	56.00	70.50	13	Did not advance				
Filip Stene-Johansen	Men's slopestyle	52.75	33.00	52.75	17	Did not advance				

== Ice hockey ==
Norway qualified a team of eighteen ice hockey players for the women's six-team tournament.

Roster

Isaac Palmgren served as head coach, Maximillian Pettersson and Camilla Bakkene were assistant coaches, and Mia Christina Isdahl was goalkeeper coach.

- Mille Are-Ekstrøm – A
- Tuva Are-Ekstrøm
- Cornelia Bax-Kristiansen
- Jenny Bekken
- Hanna Eline Engløkk
- Pia Helle
- Eneah Holm
- Vilde Mathilde Jolma-Stensland
- Ragnhild Klomstad
- Mari Brevik Kristiansen – C
- Fiona Angela Raya Larsen
- Thilde Elisabeth Lillenes-Taftø
- Shiva Nobari
- Maja Kvandal Raknes
- Julie Vilje Rosenlund
- Tyra Knedal Sawyer – A
- Timea Scurkova
- Elvira Stavnes

Summary

Key:

- GWS – Game winning shots
- E – Eliminated

Team	Event	Group stage			Semifinal	Final	
Team	Event	Opponent Score	Opponent Score	Rank	Opponent Score	Opponent Score	Rank
Norway	Women's tournament	Sweden; L 1–5	Japan; L 1–5	E	Did not advance		6

=== Women's tournament ===
Preliminary round, Group A

Pos	Team	Pld	W	SOW	SOL	L	GF	GA	GD	Pts	Qualification
1	Sweden	2	1	1	0	0	7	2	+5	5	Semifinals
2	Japan	2	1	0	1	0	6	3	+3	4	Semifinals
3	Norway	2	0	0	0	2	2	10	−8	0	

Source: IOC

27 January 2024; 11:00	Norway	1–5 (0–1, 0–1, 1–3)	Sweden	Gangneung Hockey Centre; Attendance: 2,061

Game reference

Tuva Are-Ekstrøm
Goalies
Tilde Wyckman
Referees:
(China) Ding Siwen
(United States) Maria Gherardi
Linesmen:
(Germany) Lara Fischer
(Ukraine) Anhelina Maifeld

	0–1	13:07 – Ytfeldt (Westerlind) (PP)
	0–2	15:48 – Westerlind (Grillfors)
	0–3	33:03 – Grillfors (Andersson, Westerlind)
	0–4	34:23 – Österman (Carlsson, Berndtsson)
Bax-Kristiansen (Helle, M. Are-Ekstrøm) (PP) – 37:53	1–4
	1–5	39:23 – Svanefjord (Ytfeldt, Österman) (PP)

6 min
Penalties
4.5 min
12
Shots
35

28 January 2024; 11:00	Japan	5–1 (1–0, 0–0, 4–1)	Norway	Gangneung Hockey Centre; Attendance: 2,837

Game reference

Suzuno Fukuda
Goalies
Shiva Nobari
Referees:
(China) Ding Siwen
(Canada) Beatrice Fortin
Linesmen:
(United States) Laura Schmidlein
(Finland) Ilona Silander

Terauchi (Odaira, Numabe) (PP) – 10:47	1–0
Numabe (Odaira, Terauchi) – 30:41	2–0
	2–1	33:25 – Helle, (Klomstad, Bax-Kristiansen) (PP)
Odaira (Numabe, Terauchi) – 36:17	3–1
Numabe (Terauchi, Odaira) – 40:12	4–1
Odaira (Numabe) – 43:04	5–1

6 min
Penalties
6 min
41
Shots
13

== Luge ==
Norway qualified one male luger

Men

Athlete	Event	Run 1		Run 2		Total	
Athlete	Event	Time	Rank	Time	Rank	Time	Rank
Ola Brandstadmoen	Singles	47.131	6	47.247	7	1:34.378	6

== Nordic combined ==
Individual

Athlete	Event	Ski jumping				Cross-country	
Athlete	Event	Distance	Points	Rank	Deficit	Time	Rank
Erik Leiråmo	Men's normal hill/6 km	99.5	113.9	11	+1:48	15:18.4	9
Sverre Kumar Lundeby	Men's normal hill/6 km	95.0	105.8	16	+2:21	15:49.5	15
Nora Helene Evans	Women's normal hill/4 km	94.0	102.6	11	+2:03	13:32.0	13
Ingrid Låte	Women's normal hill/4 km	103.0	115.0	5	+1:32	12:13.9	5

Team

Athlete	Event	Ski jumping			Cross-country	
Athlete	Event	Points	Rank	Deficit	Time	Rank
Nora Helene Evans; Sverre Kumar Lundeby; Erik Leiråmo; Ingrid Låte	Mixed team	448.4	1	0:00	35:17.8	5

== Ski jumping ==
Norway qualified four ski jumpers (two per gender).

Individual

Athlete	Event	First round			Final			Total	
Athlete	Event	Distance	Points	Rank	Distance	Points	Rank	Points	Rank
Oddvar Gunnerød	Men's normal hill	94.5	86.9	14	83.5	57.9	30	144.8	20
Mats Strandbråten	Men's normal hill	94.0	89.2	12	100.5	102.3	6	191.5	11
Kjersti Græsli	Women's normal hill	95.0	89.3	6	101.0	100.1	5	189.4	5
Ingvild Synnøve Midtskogen	Women's normal hill	104.5	109.7	2	95.0	95.0	7	204.7	3rd place, bronze medalist(s)

Team

Athlete	Event	First round				Final				Total	
Athlete	Event	Distance	Points	Team points	Rank	Distance	Points	Team points	Rank	Points	Rank
Kjersti Græsli; Oddvar Gunnerød; Ingvild Synnøve Midtskogen; Mats Strandbråten	Mixed team	106.5; 97.0; 102.0; 90.0	109.4; 96.3; 108.9; 83.5	398.1	2	95.0; 97.0; 107.5; 92.5	101.2; 100.4; 124.7; 93.9	490.2	2	818.3	2nd place, silver medalist(s)

== Snowboarding ==
Halfpipe, Slopestyle & Big Air

Athlete	Event	Qualification				Final				
Athlete	Event	Run 1	Run 2	Best	Rank	Run 1	Run 2	Run 3	Best	Rank
Niklas Sukke	Men's slopestyle	17.25	28.75	28.75	17	Did not advance				
Niklas Sukke	Men's big air	72.75	16.00	72.75	9 Q	Did not start				

== Speed skating ==
Men

Athlete	Event	Time	Rank
Eirik Andersen	500 m	37.90	12
Eirik Andersen	1500 m	1:54.04	4
Miika Johan Klevstuen	500 m	36.79	2nd place, silver medalist(s)
Miika Johan Klevstuen	1500 m	1:57.18	13

Women

Athlete	Event	Time	Rank
Anne Sofie Knutsen Birkedal	500 m	42.60	18
Anne Sofie Knutsen Birkedal	1500 m	2:18.59	24
Martine Solem	500 m	41.93	14
Martine Solem	1500 m	2:12.28	16

Mass Start

Athlete	Event	Semifinal			Final		
Athlete	Event	Points	Time	Rank	Points	Time	Rank
Eirik Andersen	Men's mass start	23	5:31.270	2 Q	10	5:30.17	3rd place, bronze medalist(s)
Miika Johan Klevstuen	Men's mass start	23	6:21.04	2 Q	0	5:31.86	12
Anne Sofie Knutsen Birkedal	Women's mass start	0	6:02.03	11	Did not advance		
Martine Solem	Women's mass start	10	6:23.64	3 Q	0	5:59.56	13

Mixed relay

Athlete	Event	Semifinal		Final	
Athlete	Event	Time	Rank	Time	Rank
Miika Johan Klevstuen; Martine Solem	Mixed relay	3:12.19	6	Did not advance	

== Non-competing sports ==
=== Alpine skiing ===
Norway originally qualified six alpine skiers, but declined all six quota spots.

=== Cross-country skiing ===
Norway originally qualified six cross-country skiers, but declined all six quota spots. The Norwegian Skiing Association felt the event was not a correct part of the development of athletes.

== See also ==
- Norway at the 2024 Summer Olympics
