= United States at the 2024 Winter Youth Olympics =

- Flag of United States
- IOC code: USA
- NOC: United States Olympic & Paralympic Committee

in Gangwon, South Korea 19 January 2024 – 1 February 2024
- Competitors: 101 in 15 sports
- Flag bearers (opening): Noah Park & Eliza Rhodehamel
- Flag bearer (closing): TBD
- Medals Ranked 6th: Gold 5 Silver 11 Bronze 5 Total 21

Winter Youth Olympics appearances (overview)
- 2012; 2016; 2020; 2024

The United States is scheduled to compete at the 2024 Winter Youth Olympics in Gangwon, South Korea, from January 19 to February 1, 2024. This will be United States's fourth appearance at the Winter Youth Olympic Games, having competed at every Games since the inaugural edition in 2012.

The United States team consisted of 101 athletes competing in all 15 sports. Skeleton athlete Noah Park and short track speed skater Eliza Rhodehamel were the country's flagbearers during the opening ceremony.

== Medalists ==
Medal	Name	Sport	Event	Date
Gold	Sean Shuai	Short track speed skating	Men's 500 metres	22 January
Gold	Henry Townshend	Freestyle skiing	Men's slopestyle	25 January
Gold	Elizabeth Lemley; Porter Huff	Freestyle skiing	Mixed team dual moguls	26 January
Gold	Elizabeth Lemley	Freestyle skiing	Women's dual moguls	27 January
Gold	United States men's national under-16 ice hockey team	Ice hockey	Men's tournament	31 January
Silver	Josie Johnson	Ski jumping	Women's individual normal hill	20 January
Silver	Morgan Shute	Freestyle skiing	Women's ski cross	23 January
Silver	Kyeun Eun Jang; Eliza Rhodehamel; Julius Kazanecki; Sean Shuai	Short track speed skating	Mixed relay	24 January
Silver	Walker Robinson; Morgan Shute	Freestyle skiing	Mixed team ski cross	24 January
Silver	Porter Huff	Freestyle skiing	Men's dual moguls	27 January
Silver	Rebecca Flynn	Snowboarding	Women's big air	28 January
Silver	Oliver Martin	Snowboarding	Men's big air	28 January
Silver	Cayla Smith; Jared McPike	Figure skating	Pair skating	29 January
Silver	Olivia Ilin; Dylan Cain	Figure skating	Ice dance	30 January
Silver	Dylan Cain; Olivia Ilin; Jared McPike; Jacob Sanchez; Cayla Smith; Sherry Zhang	Figure skating	Team event	1 February
Silver	Alessandro Barbieri	Snowboarding	Men's halfpipe	1 February
Bronze	Abby McLarnon; Jiah Cohen	Freestyle skiing	Mixed team dual moguls	26 January
Bronze	Abby McLarnon	Freestyle skiing	Women's dual moguls	27 January
Bronze	Tabor Greenberg	Cross-country skiing	Men's sprint	29 January
Bronze	Kate Gray	Freestyle skiing	Women's halfpipe	31 January
Bronze	Ella Wendling; Benji Paral	Curling	Mixed doubles	1 February

== Competitors ==
The following is the list of number of competitors (per gender) participating at the games per sport/discipline.

Sport	Men	Women	Total
Alpine skiing	2	3	5
Biathlon	3	3	6
Bobsleigh	1	2	3
Cross-country skiing	3	3	6
Curling	3	3	6
Figure skating	3	3	6
Freestyle skiing			14
Hockey	18	0	18
Luge	3	4	7
Nordic combined	2	2	4
Short track speed skating	2	2	4
Skeleton	2	1	3
Ski jumping	2	2	4
Snowboarding			12
Speed skating	2	1	3
Total	5	6	101

== Alpine skiing ==
United States qualified five alpine skiers (two men and three women).

Men

Athlete	Event	Run 1		Run 2		Total	
Athlete	Event	Time	Rank	Time	Rank	Time	Rank
Stewart Bruce	Super-G	—N/a				55.17	10
Stewart Bruce	Giant slalom	50.67	15	46.60	14	1:37.27	10
Stewart Bruce	Slalom	48.74	21	52.97	8	1:41.71	10
Stewart Bruce	Combined	56.20	25	55.95	12	1:52.15	18
Jevin Palmquist	Super-G	—N/a				DNF	
Jevin Palmquist	Giant slalom	50.86	16	46.26	8	1:37.12	8
Jevin Palmquist	Slalom	47.64	8	52.51	5	1:40.15	5
Jevin Palmquist	Combined	55.33	11	55.22	6	1:50.55	7

Women

Athlete	Event	Run 1		Run 2		Total	
Athlete	Event	Time	Rank	Time	Rank	Time	Rank
Nicole Begue	Super-G	—N/a				54.22	6
Nicole Begue	Giant slalom	DNF					
Nicole Begue	Slalom	52.52	21	DNF			
Nicole Begue	Combined	57.42	11	53.22	14	1:50.64	12
Annika Hunt	Super-G	—N/a				DNF	
Annika Hunt	Giant slalom	51.30	20	53.37	7	1:44.67	13
Annika Hunt	Slalom	50.83	7	DNF			
Annika Hunt	Combined	DNS					
Christina Winchell	Super-G	—N/a				56.16	22
Christina Winchell	Giant slalom	DQ					
Christina Winchell	Slalom	55.22	34	53.47	25	1:48.69	25
Christina Winchell	Combined	58.70	26	54.68	20	1:53.38	21

Mixed

Athlete	Event	Round of 16	Quarterfinals	Semifinals	Final / BM	
Athlete	Event	Opposition Result	Opposition Result	Opposition Result	Opposition Result	Rank
Annika Hunt; Jevin Palmquist	Parallel mixed team	Slovakia; W 3–1	Italy; W 2*–2	Austria; L 1–3	Finland; L 2–2*	4

== Biathlon ==
Men

Athlete	Event	Time	Misses	Rank
Noa Kam-Magruder	Sprint	25:14.6	7 (5+2)	62
Noa Kam-Magruder	Individual	48:39.1	7 (1+2+1+3)	48
John Lohuis	Sprint	24:11.3	1 (0+1)	38
John Lohuis	Individual	47:55.6	6 (2+3+0+1)	35
Elias Soule	Sprint	23:33.2	5 (2+3)	23
Elias Soule	Individual	47:23.7	5 (0+0+2+3)	31

Women

Athlete	Event	Time	Misses	Rank
Emily Campbell	Sprint	27:35.7	9 (5+4)	76
Emily Campbell	Individual	44:10.0	2 (1+0+1+0)	45
Molly Maybach	Sprint	22:26.1	3 (1+2)	27
Molly Maybach	Individual	47:22.5	8 (2+3+0+3)	71
Alexandria Taylor	Sprint	25:53.0	7 (3+4)	65
Alexandria Taylor	Individual	44:54.7	6 (0+3+1+2)	56

Mixed

Athletes	Event	Time	Misses	Rank
Emily Campbell; Elias Soule	Single mixed relay	54:10.8	21 (6+15)	28
Alexandria Taylor; Molly Maybach; Noa Kam-Magruder; John Lohuis	Mixed relay	DNF		

== Bobsleigh ==
Athlete	Event	Run 1		Run 2		Total	
Athlete	Event	Time	Rank	Time	Rank	Time	Rank
John Lansing	Men's monobob	55.21	7	56.01	9	1:51.22	9
Liam McKenna	Men's monobob	56.77	18	56.77	17	1:53.54	18
Emily Bradley	Women's monobob	57.08	4	58.35	11	1:55.43	8

== Cross-country skiing ==
The United States qualified six cross-country skiers (three per gender).

Men

Athlete	Event	Qualification		Quarterfinal		Semifinal		Final	
Athlete	Event	Time	Rank	Time	Rank	Time	Rank	Time	Rank
Benjamin Barbier	7.5 km classical	—N/a						20:26.3	11
Benjamin Barbier	Sprint freestyle	3:06.34	6 Q	3:15.90	6	Did not advance			
Tabor Greenberg	7.5 km classical	—N/a						20:29.4	12
Tabor Greenberg	Sprint freestyle	3:08.64	13 Q	3:07.08	1 Q	3:09.69	3 LL	3:17.33	3rd place, bronze medalist(s)
Landon Wyatt	7.5 km classical	—N/a						20:48.5	18
Landon Wyatt	Sprint freestyle	3:13.69	30 Q	3:13.95	5	Did not advance			

Women

Athlete	Event	Qualification		Quarterfinal		Semifinal		Final	
Athlete	Event	Time	Rank	Time	Rank	Time	Rank	Time	Rank
Sydney Drevlow	7.5 km classical	—N/a						23:30.9	19
Sydney Drevlow	Sprint freestyle	3:36.98	9 Q	3:39.01	6	Did not advance			
Neve Gerard	7.5 km classical	—N/a						22:45.1	6
Neve Gerard	Sprint freestyle	3:39.84	15 Q	3:41.61	4	Did not advance			
Rose Horning	7.5 km classical	—N/a						23:16.4	13
Rose Horning	Sprint freestyle	3:42.15	21 Q	3:42.49	4	Did not advance			

Mixed

Athlete	Event	Time	Rank
Rose Horning; Benjamin Barbier; Neve Gerard; Tabor Greenberg	Mixed relay	54:02.0	5

== Curling ==
The United States qualified a mixed team and mixed doubles pair for a total of six athletes.

Summary

Team	Event	Group Stage								Quarterfinal	Semifinal	Final / BM	
Team	Event	Opposition Score	Opposition Score	Opposition Score	Opposition Score	Opposition Score	Opposition Score	Opposition Score	Rank	Opposition Score	Opposition Score	Opposition Score	Rank
Kenna Ponzio; Zachary Brenden; Owen Nelson; Teagan Thurston	Mixed team	Norway; W 8–3	New Zealand; W 8–4	Turkey; W 8–2	Japan; W 8–6	Nigeria; W 20–0	Sweden; W 11–5	China; L 5–6	2 Q	Switzerland; L 3–4	Did not advance		5
Ella Wendling; Benji Paral	Mixed doubles	Sweden; W 6–5	Qatar; W 13–1	Norway; W 8–3	Ukraine; W 9–1	Slovenia; W 12–0	—N/a		1 Q	Czech Republic; W 8–7	Denmark; L 5–6	Sweden; W 7–4	3rd place, bronze medalist(s)

=== Mixed team ===
Group A	Skip	W	L	W–L	PF	PA	EW	EL	BE	SE	DSC
China	Li Zetai	6	1	1–0	65	25	28	17	0	12	59.04
United States	Kenna Ponzio	6	1	0–1	68	26	31	16	1	15	51.38
Japan	Kaito Fujii	5	2	1–0	64	26	27	17	2	11	39.53
Sweden	Vilmer Nygren	5	2	0–1	55	42	27	19	5	10	58.05
Norway	Alexander Johansen	3	4	–	49	39	25	19	2	11	65.33
Turkey	Muhammed Taha Zenit	2	5	–	41	40	16	26	5	5	82.17
New Zealand	Jed Nevill	1	6	–	27	44	18	23	3	6	86.52
Nigeria	Goodnews Charles	0	7	–	6	133	4	39	1	0	199.60

Round robin

Draw 1

Saturday, January 20, 10:00

Sheet A	1	2	3	4	5	6	7	8	Final
United States (Ponzio) 🔨	0	2	0	1	0	3	1	1	8
Norway (Johansen)	0	0	1	0	2	0	0	0	3

Draw 2

Saturday, January 20, 18:00

Sheet C	1	2	3	4	5	6	7	8	Final
New Zealand (Nevill) 🔨	0	0	2	0	1	0	1	X	4
United States (Ponzio)	1	4	0	1	0	2	0	X	8

Draw 3

Sunday, January 21, 14:00

Sheet D	1	2	3	4	5	6	7	8	Final
United States (Ponzio) 🔨	1	0	2	3	2	0	X	X	8
Turkey (Zenit)	0	1	0	0	0	1	X	X	2

Draw 4

Monday, January 22, 10:00

Sheet B	1	2	3	4	5	6	7	8	Final
United States (Ponzio)	0	1	0	0	2	0	2	3	8
Japan (Fujii) 🔨	2	0	0	1	0	3	0	0	6

Draw 5

Monday, January 22, 18:00

Sheet D	1	2	3	4	5	6	7	8	Final
Nigeria (Charles)	0	0	0	0	0	0	X	X	0
United States (Ponzio) 🔨	4	3	3	1	6	3	X	X	20

Draw 6

Tuesday, January 23, 14:00

Sheet C	1	2	3	4	5	6	7	8	Final
United States (Ponzio)	0	4	5	0	2	0	X	X	11
Sweden (Nygren) 🔨	2	0	0	2	0	1	X	X	5

Draw 7

Wednesday, January 24, 9:00

Sheet A	1	2	3	4	5	6	7	8	Final
China (Li)	2	0	2	0	0	2	0	0	6
United States (Ponzio) 🔨	0	1	0	1	1	0	1	1	5

Qualification Game

Wednesday, January 24, 19:00

Sheet A	1	2	3	4	5	6	7	8	Final
United States (Ponzio) 🔨	0	2	0	0	0	1	0	0	3
Switzerland (Dryburgh)	0	0	1	1	0	0	2	0	4

=== Mixed doubles ===
Group B	W	L	W–L	DSC
United States	5	0	–	61.18
Sweden	4	1	–	78.69
Norway	3	2	–	34.37
Slovenia	2	3	–	112.84
Ukraine	1	4	–	74.81
Qatar	0	5	–	155.39

Round robin

Draw 3

Saturday, January 27, 14:00

Sheet C	1	2	3	4	5	6	7	8	Final
United States (Wendling / Paral) 🔨	1	1	1	0	0	2	0	1	6
Sweden (Roxin / Meyerson)	0	0	0	2	1	0	2	0	5

Draw 6

Sunday, January 28, 14:00

Sheet D	1	2	3	4	5	6	7	8	Final
United States (Wendling / Paral) 🔨	3	0	3	2	1	3	1	X	13
Qatar (Al-Fahad / Alnaimi)	0	1	0	0	0	0	0	X	1

Draw 10

Monday, January 29, 18:00

Sheet B	1	2	3	4	5	6	7	8	Final
Norway (Hausstaetter / Svorkmo Lundberg) 🔨	0	1	1	0	0	1	0	X	3
United States (Wendling / Paral)	1	0	0	2	4	0	1	X	8

Draw 12

Tuesday, January 30, 14:00

Sheet A	1	2	3	4	5	6	7	8	Final
Ukraine (Lytvynenko / Shlyk)	0	0	0	1	0	0	X	X	1
United States (Wendling / Paral) 🔨	2	3	1	0	1	2	X	X	9

Draw 14

Wednesday, January 31, 9:00

Sheet A	1	2	3	4	5	6	7	8	Final
United States (Wendling / Paral) 🔨	1	2	3	1	2	3	X	X	12
Slovenia (Kavčič / Omerzel)	0	0	0	0	0	0	X	X	0

Quarterfinal

Wednesday, January 31, 19:00

Sheet C	1	2	3	4	5	6	7	8	Final
Czech Republic (Zelingrová / Bláha)	0	1	1	1	0	0	4	0	7
United States (Wendling / Paral) 🔨	1	0	0	0	2	1	0	4	8

Semifinal

Thursday, February 1, 9:00

Sheet A	1	2	3	4	5	6	7	8	Final
United States (Wendling / Paral)	1	0	1	1	0	1	1	0	5
Denmark (Schmidt / Schmidt) 🔨	0	2	0	0	3	0	0	1	6

Bronze medal game

Thursday, February 1, 13:00

Sheet B	1	2	3	4	5	6	7	8	9	Final
Sweden (Roxin / Meyerson) 🔨	1	0	1	1	1	0	0	0	0	4
United States (Wendling / Paral)	0	1	0	0	0	1	1	1	3	7

== Figure skating ==
Athlete	Event	SP/SD		FS/FD		Total	
Athlete	Event	Points	Rank	Points	Rank	Points	Rank
Jacob Sanchez	Men's singles	76.38	1	123.90	6	200.28	4
Sherry Zhang	Women's singles	45.97	14	123.48	3	169.45	6
Cayla Smith; Jared McPike	Pairs	36.80	2	61.20	3	98.00	2nd place, silver medalist(s)
Olivia Ilin; Dylan Cain	Ice dance	57.46	2	84.92	3	142.38	2nd place, silver medalist(s)

Team event

Athlete	Event	Free skate / Free dance				Total	
Athlete	Event	Men's	Women's	Pairs	Ice dance	Points	Rank
Athlete	Event	Points Team points	Points Team points	Points Team points	Points Team points	Points	Rank
Jacob Sanchez (M); Sherry Zhang (W); Cayla Smith / Jared McPike (P); Olivia Ilin / Dylan Cain (ID)	Team event	129.77; 4	122.76; 4	63.55; ~~4~~	88.63; 4	12	2nd place, silver medalist(s)

== Freestyle skiing ==
Dual moguls
Individual

Athlete	Event	Group Stage						Semifinals	Final / BM	
Athlete	Event	Opposition Result	Opposition Result	Opposition Result	Opposition Result	Points	Rank	Opposition Result	Opposition Result	Rank
Jiah Cohen	Men's dual moguls	Moberg (SWE); W 3–2	Zvalený (CZE); W 3–2	Gay (FRA); W 3–2	Verdaguer (ESP); L 2–3	11	1 Q	Lee (KOR); L 15–20	Nakamura (JPN); L 16–19	4
Porter Huff	Men's dual moguls	Gravenfors (SWE); W 3–2	Lampi (FIN); W 3–2	Long (CHN); W 3–2	Gianella (SUI); W 3–DNF	12	1 Q	Nakamura (JPN); W 32–3	Lee (KOR); L 17–18	2nd place, silver medalist(s)
Elizabeth Lemley	Women's dual moguls	Yun (KOR); W 3–2	Lamontagne (CAN); W 3–2	Nilsson (SWE); W 3–2	Hedberg (SWE); W 3–2	12	1 Q	Passaretta (ITA); W 25–10	Lodge (AUS); W 22–13	1st place, gold medalist(s)
Abby McLarnon	Women's dual moguls	Michl (GER); W 3–2	Boychuk (CAN); W 3–2	Eckle (GER); W 3–2	Tlapáková (CZE); W 3–2	12	1 Q	Lodge (AUS); L 15–20	Passaretta (ITA); W 19–16	3rd place, bronze medalist(s)

Team

Athlete	Event	Round of 16	Quarterfinals	Semifinals	Final / BM	
Athlete	Event	Opposition Result	Opposition Result	Opposition Result	Opposition Result	Rank
Elizabeth Lemley; Porter Huff	Mixed team	Bye	Boychuk / Sauvageau (CAN); W 50–20	Sakai / Nakamura (JPN); W 38–32	Yun / Lee (KOR); W 43–27	1st place, gold medalist(s)
Abby McLarnon; Jiah Cohen	Mixed team	Kisil / Perets (UKR); W 68–2	Joly / Gay (FRA); W 39–31	Yun / Lee (KOR); L 35–35*	Sakai / Nakamura (JPN); W 44–26	3rd place, bronze medalist(s)

Ski cross
Individual

Athlete	Event	Group heats		Semifinal	Final
Athlete	Event	Points	Rank	Position	Position
Aiden England	Men's ski cross	10	11	Did not advance	
Walker Robinson	Men's ski cross	17	3 Q	2 BF	4
Morgan Shute	Women's ski cross	20	1 Q	1 BF	2nd place, silver medalist(s)
Maggie Swain	Women's ski cross	16	5	Did not advance	

Team

Athlete	Event	Pre-heats	Quarterfinal	Semifinal	Final
Athlete	Event	Position	Position	Position	Position
Aiden England; Maggie Swain	Team ski cross	—N/a	2 Q	4 SF	7
Walker Robinson; Morgan Shute	Team ski cross	—N/a	1 Q	2 BF	2nd place, silver medalist(s)

Halfpipe, Slopestyle & Big Air

Athlete	Event	Qualification				Final				
Athlete	Event	Run 1	Run 2	Best	Rank	Run 1	Run 2	Run 3	Best	Rank
Ben Fethke	Men's halfpipe	63.25	34.50	63.25	6 Q	37.00	30.50	72.50	72.50	6
Hunter Maytin	Men's halfpipe	70.25	22.00	70.25	4 Q	25.75	75.25	25.75	75.25	5
Jack Rodeheaver	Men's big air	30.00	13.00	30.00	21	Did not advance				
Jack Rodeheaver	Men's slopestyle	31.75	32.75	32.75	19	Did not advance				
Henry Townshend	Men's big air	16.00	75.75	75.75	11	Did not advance				
Henry Townshend	Men's slopestyle	76.25	78.00	78.00	7 Q	90.25	26.25	80.25	90.25	1st place, gold medalist(s)
Eleanor Andrews	Women's big air	59.00	67.75	67.75	7 Q	79.00	55.25	33.75	134.25	5
Eleanor Andrews	Women's slopestyle	79.25	9.25	79.25	3 Q	53.50	32.50	43.25	53.50	8
Piper Arnold	Women's halfpipe	64.25	66.50	66.50	4 Q	60.75	58.75	60.00	60.75	4
Kate Gray	Women's big air	68.75	65.75	68.75	6 Q	61.00	64.50	68.50	133.00	7
Kate Gray	Women's halfpipe	81.50	24.50	81.50	3 Q	75.00	78.75	79.25	79.25	3rd place, bronze medalist(s)
Kate Gray	Women's slopestyle	76.00	75.75	76.00	5 Q	60.00	49.25	63.75	63.75	6

== Ice hockey ==
The United States qualified a men's hockey team of 18 athletes.

=== Men's tournament ===
The team roster is listed as follows:

No.	Pos.	2024 Winter Youth Olympics United States U-16 boys' ice hockey team roster	Height	Weight	Birthdate	Hometown	Current Team
1	G	Xavier Wendt	180 cm (5 ft 11 in)	73 kg (161 lb)	24 January 2008	Plymouth, Minnesota	Shattuck-Saint Mary's
2	F	JP Hurlbert	178 cm (5 ft 10 in)	63 kg (139 lb)	11 April 2008	Allen, Texas	Dallas Stars Elite Hockey Club
4	D	AJ Francisco	180 cm (5 ft 11 in)	75 kg (165 lb)	10 January 2008	Hermantown, Minnesota	Hermantown High School
5	D	Jackson Marthaler	185 cm (6 ft 1 in)	83 kg (183 lb)	10 February 2008	Superior, Wisconsin	Superior High School
7	F	Shaeffer Gordon-Carroll	180 cm (5 ft 11 in)	78 kg (172 lb)	26 November 2008	Salt Lake City, Utah	Chicago Mission
9	F	Cole Bumgarner	185 cm (6 ft 1 in)	84 kg (185 lb)	25 April 2008	Albertville, Minnesota	Rogers High School
10	F	Spencer Thornborough	183 cm (6 ft 0 in)	77 kg (170 lb)	22 June 2008	Boxford, Massachusetts	The Governor's Academy
11	F	Mikey Berchild – A	175 cm (5 ft 9 in)	75 kg (165 lb)	16 February 2008	Excelsior, Minnesota	Shattuck-Saint Mary's
13	D	Abe Barnett	183 cm (6 ft 0 in)	79 kg (174 lb)	21 September 2008	Glencoe, Illinois	Chicago Mission
14	D	Logan Lutner	178 cm (5 ft 10 in)	72 kg (159 lb)	21 February 2008	Maple Grove, Minnesota	Maple Grove High School
15	D	Luke Schairer	191 cm (6 ft 3 in)	79 kg (174 lb)	30 January 2008	Charlotte, North Carolina	Mount Saint Charles Academy
16	F	Parker Trottier – C	183 cm (6 ft 0 in)	75 kg (165 lb)	13 February 2008	Edina, Minnesota	Shattuck-Saint Mary's
18	F	Zane Torre	183 cm (6 ft 0 in)	84 kg (185 lb)	14 April 2008	Ladera Ranch, California	Shattuck-Saint Mary's
19	F	Aurelio Garcia – A	178 cm (5 ft 10 in)	78 kg (172 lb)	3 June 2008	Romeoville, Illinois	Chicago Mission
20	D	Tyler Martyniuk	180 cm (5 ft 11 in)	79 kg (174 lb)	31 December 2008	Washington Township, Michigan	HoneyBaked Hockey Club
21	F	Logan Stuart	175 cm (5 ft 9 in)	70 kg (150 lb)	23 April 2008	Los Angeles, California	Little Caesars Hockey
30	G	Gavin Weeks	178 cm (5 ft 10 in)	83 kg (183 lb)	3 August 2008	Manchester, New Hampshire	Bishop Kearney Selects

Coaching staff

Head Coach: Joe Bonnett
Assistant Coaches: Jason Guerriero, Matt Gilroy, Dave Caruso

Summary

Key:

- OT – Overtime
- GWS – Match decided by game winning shots

Team	Event	Group stage			Semifinal	Final	
Team	Event	Opposition Score	Opposition Score	Rank	Opposition Score	Opposition Score	Rank
United States Men's	Men's tournament	Slovakia; W 5–4 GWS	Czech Republic; L 5–6 GWS	2 Q	Canada; W 6–5 GWS	Czech Republic; W 4–0	1st place, gold medalist(s)

Group A

Pos	Team	Pld	W	SOW	SOL	L	GF	GA	GD	Pts	Qualification
1	Czech Republic	2	1	1	0	0	9	7	+2	5	Semifinals
2	United States	2	0	1	1	0	10	10	0	3	Semifinals
3	Slovakia	2	0	0	1	1	6	8	−2	1	

Source: Gangwon 2024

27 January 2024; 14:00	Slovakia	4–5 GWS (1–1, 3–1, 0–2) (SO: 0–1)	United States	Gangneung Hockey Centre; Attendance: 4,056

Game reference

Samuel Hrenák
Goalies
Xavier Wendt
Referees:
(Denmark) Rasmus Ankersen
(United Kingdom) Joseph Sewell
Linesmen:
(Canada) Mitchell Gibbs
(South Korea) Lim Jun-seo

	0–1	01:37 – Torre (Schairer, Garcia)
Syrný (Kubat) – 11:36	1–1
	1–2	18:43 – Hurlbert (Francisco, Berchild) (PP)
Ďurčo (Rausa, Goljer) (PP) – 22:10	2–2
Rezničák – 24:15	3–2
Rezničák (Stankoven) – 29:14	4–2
	4–3	36:57 – Bumgarner (Stuart, Marthaler)
	4–4	44:06 – Torre (Trottier, Berchild) (PP, EA)

Ďurčo (miss)
Goljer (miss)
Shootout
(miss) Hurlbert
Berchild
Francisco
7.5 min
Penalties
4.5 min
20
Shots
39

29 January 2024; 14:00	United States	5–6 GWS (3–1, 2–2, 0–2) (SO: 0–1)	Czech Republic	Gangneung Hockey Centre; Attendance: 3,203

Game reference

Gavin Weeks
Goalies
Jan Láryš
Referees:
(Canada) Mathieu Boudreau
(Netherlands) Adler Steenstra
Linesmen:
(Canada) Mitchell Gibbs
(Uzbekistan) David Prokofyev

Barnett (Francisco, Marthaler) – 05:48	1–0
	1–1	08:39 – Katolický (Kachlíř, Tomek) (PP)
Berchild (Trottier) – 09:30	2–1
Stuart (Barnett) – 14:59	3–1
Schairer (Hurlbert, Berchild) – 20:45	4–1
	4–2	22:29 – Katolický (Tomek)
	4–3	25:57 – Ruml (Nedorost, Hanyš) (PP)
Hurlbert – 27:18	5–3
	5–4	37:26 – Novák (SH)
	5–5	42:49 – Novák (Tomek)

Hurlbert
Berchild (miss)
Francisco (miss)
Stuart (miss)
Bumgarner (miss)
Torre (miss)
Shootout
Katolický
(miss) Huk
(miss) Novák
(miss) Tomek
(miss) Kachlíř
Nedorost
7.5 min
Penalties
4.5 min
35
Shots
19

Semifinal

30 January 2024; 20:00	Canada	5–6 GWS (0–0, 2–3, 3–2) (SO: 0–1)	United States	Gangneung Hockey Centre; Attendance: 2,238

Game reference

Carter Esler
Mateo Beites
Goalies
Xavier Wendt
Referees:
(Norway) Oskar Øvstedal
(United Kingdom) Joseph Sewell
Linesmen:
(Czech Republic) David Thuma
(Sweden) Niclas Westman

	0–1	16:39 – Trottier
Di Iorio – 17:19	1–1
	1–2	17:58 – Hurlbert (Stuart)
	1–3	19:44 – Gordon-Carroll (Torre)
Nyman (Lin, Preston) (PP2) – 22:38	2–3
Preston – 30:29	3–3
	3–4	32:22 – Trottier (Berchild)
Preston (Lawrence) – 38:31	4–4
	4–5	39:59 – Trottier (Martyniuk, Schairer)
Nyman (Verhoeff, Lawrence) – 42:54	5–5

Di Iorio (miss)
Preston (miss)
Nyman (miss)
Shootout
Hurlbert
(miss) Berchild
(miss) Francisco
1.5 min
Penalties
6 min
42
Shots
17

Gold medal match

31 January 2024; 20:00	Czech Republic	0–4 (0–1, 0–1, 0–2)	United States	Gangneung Hockey Centre; Attendance: 4,646

Game reference

Jan Láryš
Goalies
Xavier Wendt
Referees:
(Denmark) Rasmus Ankersen
(Canada) Mathieu Boudreau
Linesmen:
(Canada) Mitchell Gibbs
(Czech Republic) David Thuma

0–1	08:39 – Berchild (Francisco, Torre) (PP)
0–2	21:04 – Hurlbert (Stuart)
0–3	40:09 – Berchild (Trottier, Hurlbert)
0–4	43:25 – Torre (Berchild, Hurlbert) (PP)

4.5 min
Penalties
1.5 min
29
Shots
23

== Luge ==
Singles & Doubles

Athlete	Event	Run 1		Run 2		Total	
Athlete	Event	Time	Rank	Time	Rank	Time	Rank
Orson Colby	Men's singles	47.973	14	48.141	17	1:36.114	14
Nathan Bivins; Wolfgang Lux	Men's doubles	52.650	10	53.482	11	1:46.132	11
Elizabeth Kleinheinz	Women's singles	50.345	23	49.669	16	1:40.014	18
Talia Tonn	Women's singles	49.064	11	DNF			
Sadie Martin; Haidyn Bunker	Women's doubles	52.890	8	DNF			

Mixed team relay

Athlete	Event	Women's singles		Men's singles		Doubles		Total	
Athlete	Event	Time	Rank	Time	Rank	Time	Rank	Time	Rank
Nathan Bivins; Orson Colby; Wolfgang Lux; Talia Tonn	Team relay	50.686	8	52.079	10	53.375	9	2:36.140	9

== Nordic combined ==
Individual

Athlete	Event	Ski jumping				Cross-country	
Athlete	Event	Distance	Points	Rank	Deficit	Time	Rank
Anders Giese	Men's normal hill/6 km	69.5	57.1	29	+5:36	19:40.2	28
Arthur Tirone	Men's normal hill/6 km	87.0	88.3	23	+3:31	17:09.3	22
Kai McKinnon	Women's normal hill/4 km	83.0	78.8	16	+3:38	14:03.9	16
Ella Wilson	Women's normal hill/4 km	95.5	104.6	9	+1:55	12:50.3	11

Team

Athlete	Event	Ski jumping				Cross-country	
Athlete	Event	Distance	Points	Rank	Deficit	Time	Rank
Kai McKinnon; Arthur Tirone; Anders Giese; Ella Wilson	Mixed team	322.0	285.8	9	+2:43	37:50.3	9

== Short track speed skating ==
Men

Athlete	Event	Heats		Quarterfinal		Semifinal		Final	
Athlete	Event	Time	Rank	Time	Rank	Time	Rank	Time	Rank
Julius Kazanecki	500 m	51.775	3 ADV	43.137	4	Did not advance			
Julius Kazanecki	1000 m	PEN		Did not advance					
Julius Kazanecki	1500 m	—N/a		2:23.412	3 Q	2:40.166	4 QB	2:42.031	11
Sean Shuai	500 m	41.755	1 Q	40.970	1 Q	41.344	1 QA	41.498	1st place, gold medalist(s)
Sean Shuai	1000 m	1:34.520	2 Q	1:27.792	2 Q	PEN		Did not advance	
Sean Shuai	1500 m	—N/a		2:23.233	1 Q	2:35.845	2 QA	2:22.177	4

Women

Athlete	Event	Heats		Quarterfinal		Semifinal		Final	
Athlete	Event	Time	Rank	Time	Rank	Time	Rank	Time	Rank
Kyung Eun Jang	500 m	46.246	2 Q	45.181	5	Did not advance			
Kyung Eun Jang	1000 m	1:38.262	2 Q	1:38.975	5	Did not advance			
Kyung Eun Jang	1500 m	—N/a		2:38.672	3 Q	2:33.880	4 QB	2:46.518	12
Eliza Rhodehamel	500 m	46.358	2 Q	45.841	4	Did not advance			
Eliza Rhodehamel	1000 m	1:38.247	2 Q	1:33.595	4	Did not advance			
Eliza Rhodehamel	1500 m	—N/a		2:28.560	4 q	2:28.955	5	Did not advance	

Mixed

Athlete	Event	Semifinal		Final	
Athlete	Event	Time	Rank	Time	Rank
Kyung Eun Jang; Julius Kazanecki; Eliza Rhodehamel; Sean Shuai	Mixed relay	2:51.078	2 QA	2:47.124	2nd place, silver medalist(s)

== Skeleton ==
Athlete	Event	Run 1		Run 2		Total	
Athlete	Event	Time	Rank	Time	Rank	Time	Rank
Baden Park	Men's	55.96	15	57.47	20	1:53.43	18
Noah Park	Men's	55.62	13	56.05	13	1:51.67	14
Biancha Emery	Women's	58.18	15	58.88	17	1:57.06	16

== Ski jumping ==
The United States qualified four ski jumpers (two per gender).

Individual

Athlete	Event	First round			Final			Total	
Athlete	Event	Distance	Points	Rank	Distance	Points	Rank	Points	Rank
Jason Colby	Men's normal hill	91.0	81.9	16	87.0	73.1	19	155.0	17
Sawyer Graves	Men's normal hill	72.5	44.4	35	82.5	59.5	28	103.9	32
Estella Hassrick	Women's normal hill	82.5	60.1	17	85.5	67.5	16	127.6	16
Josie Johnson	Women's normal hill	100.0	99.2	3	107.0	108.0	1	207.2	2nd place, silver medalist(s)

Team

Athlete	Event	First round			Final			Total	
Athlete	Event	Distance	Points	Rank	Distance	Points	Rank	Points	Rank
Estella Hassrick; Sawyer Graves; Josie Johnson; Jason Colby	Mixed team	370.5	352.8	5	350.5	330.4	7	683.2	7

== Snowboarding ==
Snowboard cross
Individual

Athlete	Event	Group stage		Semifinal	Final
Athlete	Event	Points	Rank	Position	Position
Boden Gerry	Men's snowboard cross	16	3 Q	1 BF	4
Mason Hamel	Men's snowboard cross	19	2 Q	4 SF	5
Hannah Percy	Women's snowboard cross	14	7	Did not advance	
Brianna Schnorrbusch	Women's snowboard cross	17	3 Q	4 SF	7

Mixed

Athlete	Event	Pre-heats	Quarterfinal	Semifinal	Final
Athlete	Event	Position	Position	Position	Position
Boden Gerry; Brianna Schnorrbusch	Team snowboard cross	—N/a	3	Did not advance	
Mason Hamel; Hannah Percy	Team snowboard cross	—N/a	2 Q	3 SF	5

Halfpipe, Slopestyle & Big Air

Athlete	Event	Qualification				Final				
Athlete	Event	Run 1	Run 2	Best	Rank	Run 1	Run 2	Run 3	Best	Rank
Noah Avallone	Men's halfpipe	20.50	59.50	59.50	9 Q	64.00	68.75	39.50	68.75	8
Alessandro Barbieri	Men's halfpipe	84.00	56.50	84.00	3 Q	26.50	78.75	84.75	84.75	2nd place, silver medalist(s)
Brooklyn DePriest	Men's big air	76.00	82.00	82.00	7 Q	25.00	43.75	19.50	63.25	8
Brooklyn DePriest	Men's slopestyle	47.75	78.00	78.00	3 Q	26.00	21.25	68.00	68.00	6
Oliver Martin	Men's big air	83.00	28.25	83.00	6 Q	97.25	80.75	82.25	179.50	2nd place, silver medalist(s)
Oliver Martin	Men's slopestyle	63.25	33.00	63.25	6 Q	81.25	82.25	18.25	82.25	5
Sonora Alba	Women's halfpipe	74.75	70.50	74.75	4 Q	74.00	29.50	25.75	74.00	4
Rebecca Flynn	Women's big air	86.75	89.50	89.50	2 Q	78.00	75.00	73.50	153.00	2nd place, silver medalist(s)
Rebecca Flynn	Women's slopestyle	70.75	84.00	84.00	2 Q	58.00	81.25	22.25	81.25	4
Olivia Lisle	Women's big air	8.25	DNS	8.25	19	Did not advance				
Olivia Lisle	Women's slopestyle	16.75	40.25	40.25	12	Did not advance				
Rochelle Weinberg	Women's halfpipe	63.50	51.25	63.50	8 Q	58.75	23.75	58.25	58.75	8

== Speed skating ==
Men

Athlete	Event	Time	Rank
Liam Kitchel	500 m	38.97	17
Liam Kitchel	1500 m	1:58.01	14
Max Weber	500 m	37.81	11
Max Weber	1500 m	1:54.893	6

Women

Athlete	Event	Time	Rank
Marley Soldan	500 m	43.26	22
Marley Soldan	1500 m	2:11.85	14

Mass Start

Athlete	Event	Semifinal			Final		
Athlete	Event	Points	Time	Rank	Points	Time	Rank
Liam Kitchel	Men's mass start	7	5:31.41	4 Q	0	5:32.05	14
Max Weber	Men's mass start	DQ			Did not advance		
Marley Soldan	Women's mass start	4	6:25.912	6 Q	2	5:58.07	7

Mixed relay

Athlete	Event	Semifinal		Final	
Athlete	Event	Time	Rank	Time	Rank
Marley Soldan; Max Weber	Mixed relay	3:13.80	8	Did not advance	

== See also ==
- United States at the 2024 Summer Olympics
