= Figure skating at the 2024 Winter Youth Olympics – Ice dance =

Women's singles at the IV Winter Youth Olympic Games
- Venue: Gangneung Ice Arena
- Dates: 28, 30 January
- Competitors: 24 from 10 nations

Medalists
1st place, gold medalist(s)		Ambre Perrier-Gianesini; Samuel Blanc-Klaperman	France
2nd place, silver medalist(s)		Olivia Ilin; Dylan Cain	United States
3rd place, bronze medalist(s)		Ashlie Slatter; Atl Ongay-Perez	Great Britain

The ice dance competition of the 2024 Winter Youth Olympics was held at the Gangneung Ice Arena on 28 January (rhythm dance) and 30 January 2024 (free dance).

== Results ==
=== Rhythm dance ===
The rhythm dance was held on 28 January at 13:30.

Pl.	Name	Nation	TSS	TES	PCS	CO	PR	SK	Ded	StN
1	Ambre Perrier-Gianesini / Samuel Blanc-Klaperman	France	62.39	34.42	27.97	7.07	7.00	6.96	0.00	11
2	Olivia Ilin / Dylan Cain	United States	57.46	32.31	25.15	6.32	6.29	6.29	0.00	9
3	Kim Jin-ny / Lee Na-mu	South Korea	56.58	31.16	25.42	6.36	6.43	6.32	0.00	10
4	Audra Gans / Michael Boutsan	Canada	52.99	30.39	22.60	5.61	5.71	5.68	0.00	2
5	Andrea Pšurná / Jáchym Novák	Czech Republic	51.22	28.19	23.03	5.82	5.82	5.68	0.00	8
6	Liu Tong / Ge Quanshuo	China	50.92	29.27	21.65	5.39	5.43	5.46	0.00	3
7	Ashlie Slatter / Atl Ongay-Perez	Great Britain	50.91	25.94	25.97	6.64	6.43	6.46	–1.00	12
8	Mia Lee Mayer / Davide Calderari	Germany	50.57	28.19	22.38	5.61	5.68	5.54	0.00	7
9	Caroline Kravets / Jacob Stark	Canada	47.98	25.08	22.90	5.75	5.68	5.79	0.00	5
10	Zoe Bianchi / Pietro Rota	Italy	41.50	23.25	18.25	4.54	4.64	4.54	0.00	4
11	Sofiia Rekunova / Denys Fediankin	Ukraine	35.76	20.75	15.01	3.86	3.82	3.61	0.00	6
12	Klára Vlčková / Tomáš Vlček	Czech Republic	33.09	17.79	15.30	3.96	3.79	3.75	0.00	1

=== Free dance ===
The free dance was held on 30 January at 11:30.

Pl.	Name	Nation	TSS	TES	PCS	CO	PR	SK	Ded	StN
1	Ambre Perrier-Gianesini / Samuel Blanc-Klaperman	France	92.96	51.24	42.72	7.25	7.04	7.07	-1.00	11
2	Olivia Ilin / Dylan Cain	United States	84.92	46.28	38.64	6.50	6.43	6.39	0.00	12
3	Ashlie Slatter / Atl Ongay-Perez	Great Britain	89.25	47.89	41.36	6.96	6.93	6.79	0.00	6
4	Audra Gans / Michael Boutsan	Canada	83.83	46.85	36.98	6.21	6.21	6.07	0.00	9
5	Kim Jin-ny / Lee Na-mu	South Korea	82.82	44.40	38.42	6.50	6.46	6.25	0.00	10
6	Liu Tong / Ge Quanshuo	China	75.58	41.80	34.78	5.89	5.79	5.71	-1.00	8
7	Andrea Pšurná / Jáchym Novák	Czech Republic	75.41	40.05	35.36	5.96	6.04	5.68	0.00	7
8	Mia Lee Mayer / Davide Calderari	Germany	74.87	40.37	34.50	5.89	5.79	5.57	0.00	5
9	Caroline Kravets / Jacob Stark	Canada	67.72	36.22	31.50	5.36	5.21	5.18	0.00	3
10	Zoe Bianchi / Pietro Rota	Italy	64.33	36.39	28.94	4.93	4.79	4.75	-1.00	4
11	Sofiia Rekunova / Denys Fediankin	Ukraine	57.45	32.81	24.64	4.25	4.14	3.93	0.00	2
12	Klára Vlčková / Tomáš Vlček	Czech Republic	49.24	27.24	22.00	3.82	3.61	3.57	0.00	1

=== Overall ===
Rank	Name	Nation	Total points	RD		FD	
1	Ambre Perrier-Gianesini / Samuel Blanc-Klaperman	France	155.35	1	62.39	1	92.96
2	Olivia Ilin / Dylan Cain	United States	142.38	2	57.46	3	84.92
3	Ashlie Slatter / Atl Ongay-Perez	Great Britain	140.16	7	50.91	2	89.25
4	Kim Jin-ny / Lee Na-mu	South Korea	139.40	3	56.58	5	82.82
5	Audra Gans / Michael Boutsan	Canada	136.82	4	52.99	4	83.83
6	Andrea Pšurná / Jáchym Novák	Czech Republic	126.63	5	51.22	7	75.41
7	Liu Tong / Ge Quanshuo	China	126.50	6	50.92	6	75.58
8	Mia Lee Mayer / Davide Calderari	Germany	125.44	8	50.57	8	74.87
9	Caroline Kravets / Jacob Stark	Canada	115.70	9	47.98	9	67.72
10	Zoe Bianchi / Pietro Rota	Italy	105.83	10	41.50	10	64.33
11	Sofiia Rekunova / Denys Fediankin	Ukraine	93.21	11	35.76	11	57.45
12	Klára Vlčková / Tomáš Vlček	Czech Republic	82.33	12	33.09	12	49.24
