= Freestyle skiing at the 2024 Winter Youth Olympics – Women's dual moguls =

Women's dual moguls at the IV Winter Youth Olympic Games
- Venue: High1 Resort
- Dates: 27 January
- Competitors: 20 from 14 nations

Medalists
1st place, gold medalist(s)		Elizabeth Lemley	United States
2nd place, silver medalist(s)		Lottie Lodge	Australia
3rd place, bronze medalist(s)		Abby McLarnon	United States

The цomen's dual moguls event in freestyle skiing at the 2024 Winter Youth Olympics took place on 27 January at the High1 Resort.

== Round robin ==
The round robin stage was started at 13:30.

=== Panel 1 ===
Rank	Bib	Name	Country	Opponents					Points	Notes
Rank	Bib	Name	Country	1 USA	16 SWE	9 CAN	8 KOR	20 SWE	Points	Notes
1	1	Elizabeth Lemley	United States	—N/a	W 3–2	W 3–2	W 3–2	W 3–2	12	Q
2	16	Olivia Hedberg	Sweden	L 2–3	—N/a	W 3–2	W 3–2	W 3–2	11	
3	9	Flavie Lamontagne	Canada	L 2–3	L 2–3	—N/a	W 3–2	W 3–2	10	
4	8	Yun Shin-ee	South Korea	L 2–3	L 2–3	L 2–3	—N/a	W 3–2	9	
5	20	Nova Nilsson	Sweden	L 2–3	L 2–3	L 2–3	L 2–3	—N/a	8	

=== Panel 2 ===
Rank	Bib	Name	Country	Opponents					Points	Notes
Rank	Bib	Name	Country	2 USA	10 CAN	15 GER	18 CZE	7 GER	Points	Notes
1	2	Abby McLarnon	United States	—N/a	W 3–2	W 3–2	W 3–2	W 3–2	12	Q
2	10	Citrine Boychuk	Canada	L 2–3	—N/a	W 3–2	W 3–2	W 3–2	11	
3	15	Laura Eckle	Germany	L 2–3	L 2–3	—N/a	W 3–2	W 3–2	10	
4	18	Zuzana Tlapáková	Czech Republic	L 2–3	L 2–3	L 2–3	—N/a	W 3–2	9	
5	7	Katharina Michl	Germany	L 2–3	L 2–3	L 2–3	L 2–3	—N/a	8	

=== Panel 3 ===
Rank	Bib	Name	Country	Opponents					Points	Notes
Rank	Bib	Name	Country	3 AUS	14 JPN	11 KAZ	6 FRA	19 UKR	Points	Notes
1	3	Lottie Lodge	Australia	—N/a	W 3–2	W 3–2	L 2–3	W 3–2	11	Q
2	14	Hikaru Sakai	Japan	L 2–3	—N/a	W 3–2	W 3–2	W 3–2	11	
3	11	Yuliya Feklistova	Kazakhstan	L 2–3	L 2–3	—N/a	W 3–2	W 3–2	10	
4	6	Lily Joly	France	W 3–2	L 2–3	L 2–3	—N/a	W 3–2	10	
5	19	Yuliana Kisil	Ukraine	L 2–3	L 2–3	L 2–3	L 2–3	—N/a	8	

=== Panel 4 ===
Rank	Bib	Name	Country	Opponents					Points	Notes
Rank	Bib	Name	Country	12 ITA	13 KOR	4 CHN	20 THA	5 JPN	Points	Notes
1	12	Manuela Passaretta	Italy	—N/a	W 3–2	L 2–3	W 3–2	W 3–0	11	Q
2	13	Moon Seo-young	South Korea	L 2–3	—N/a	W 3–1	W 3–2	W 3–0	11	
3	4	Li Ruilin	China	W 3–2	DNF 1–3	—N/a	W 3–1	W 3–0	10	
4	20	Natcha Frenkel	Thailand	L 2–3	L 2–3	DNF 1–3	—N/a	W 3–0	8	
	5	Rin Taguchi	Japan	DNS 0–3	DNS 0–3	DNS 0–3	DNS 0–3	—N/a	0	

== Finals ==
Semifinals
Elizabeth Lemley (USA)	25
Manuela Passaretta (ITA)	10
Abby McLarnon (USA)	15
Lottie Lodge (AUS)	20

Final
Elizabeth Lemley (USA)	22
Lottie Lodge (AUS)	13
Third place
Manuela Passaretta (ITA)	16
Abby McLarnon (USA)	19
