= Curling at the 2024 Winter Youth Olympics – Mixed doubles =

Curling – Mixed doubles at the IV Winter Youth Olympic Games
- Venue: Gangneung Curling Centre
- Dates: January 26 – February 1

Medalists
1st place, gold medalist(s)		Callie Soutar; Ethan Brewster	Great Britain
2nd place, silver medalist(s)		Katrine Schmidt; Jacob Schmidt	Denmark
3rd place, bronze medalist(s)		Ella Wendling; Benji Paral	United States

Mixed doubles curling at the 2024 Winter Youth Olympics was held from January 26 to February 1 at the Gangneung Curling Centre in Gangneung, South Korea.

== Teams ==
The teams are listed as follows:

Austria	Brazil	Canada	China
Female: Emma Müller; Male: Luis Heinisch	Female: Júlia Gentile; Male: Guilherme Melo	Female: Cailey Locke; Male: Simon Perry	Female: Gong Changyuting; Male: Xu Bokang
Czech Republic	Denmark	Germany	Great Britain
Female: Julie Zelingrová; Male: Ondřej Bláha	Female: Katrine Schmidt; Male: Jacob Schmidt	Female: Joy Sutor; Male: Leonhard Angrick	Female: Callie Soutar; Male: Ethan Brewster
Hungary	Italy	Japan	Kazakhstan
Female: Lola Nagy; Male: Benjamin Kárász	Female: Vittoria Maioni; Male: Elia Nichelatti	Female: Moka Tanaka; Male: Shinya Kawai	Female: Merey Tastemir; Male: Ibragim Tastemir
Latvia	New Zealand	Nigeria	Norway
Female: Agate Regža; Male: Kristaps Zass	Female: Olivia Russell; Male: Jed Nevill	Female: Oluwatomisin Akinsanya; Male: Roy Daniel	Female: Sylvi Iines Hausstaetter; Male: Sondre Svorkmo Lundberg
Qatar	Slovenia	South Korea	Sweden
Female: Aldana Al-Fahad; Male: Mohammed Alnaimi	Female: Pavla Kavčič; Male: Maks Omerzel	Female: Lee Chae-won; Male: Lee Ji-hun	Female: Maja Roxin; Male: Jonatan Meyerson
Switzerland	Turkey	Ukraine	United States
Female: Jana-Tamara Haehlen; Male: Nevio Caccivio	Female: Derya Ekmekçi; Male: Berat Aybar	Female: Marharyta Lytvynenko; Male: Artem Shlyk	Female: Ella Wendling; Male: Benji Paral

== Round robin standings ==
Final Round Robin Standings

Key
Teams to Playoffs

Group A	W	L	W–L	DSC
Great Britain	4	1	1–0	40.06
Czech Republic	4	1	0–1	42.84
Canada	3	2	–	54.69
Hungary	2	3	1–0	89.06
South Korea	2	3	0–1	38.09
Nigeria	0	5	–	168.42

Group B	W	L	W–L	DSC
United States	5	0	–	61.18
Sweden	4	1	–	78.69
Norway	3	2	–	34.37
Slovenia	2	3	–	112.84
Ukraine	1	4	–	74.81
Qatar	0	5	–	155.39

Group C	W	L	W–L	DSC
China	5	0	–	56.80
Japan	4	1	–	38.84
Latvia	3	2	–	77.39
Turkey	2	3	–	89.37
New Zealand	1	4	–	94.80
Brazil	0	5	–	112.92

Group D	W	L	W–L	DSC
Denmark	4	1	1–1	30.64
Germany	4	1	1–1	31.04
Switzerland	4	1	1–1	79.90
Austria	2	3	–	40.68
Kazakhstan	1	4	–	44.33
Italy	0	5	–	107.78

Group A Round Robin Summary Table
Pos.	Country	Canada	Czechia	Great Britain	Hungary	Nigeria	South Korea	Record
3	Canada	—	4–6	6–7	8–5	14–0	9–5	3–2
2	Czech Republic	6–4	—	3–8	7–2	19–0	7–5	4–1
1	Great Britain	7–6	8–3	—	8–4	18–0	2–11	4–1
5	Hungary	5–8	2–7	4–8	—	13–3	7–4	2–3
6	Nigeria	0–14	0–19	0–18	3–13	—	1–17	0–5
4	South Korea	5–9	5–7	11–2	4–7	17–1	—	2–3

Group B Round Robin Summary Table
Pos.	Country	Norway	Qatar	Slovenia	Sweden	Ukraine	United States	Record
3	Norway	—	15–0	14–4	6–7	7–2	3–8	3–2
6	Qatar	0–15	—	4–12	1–13	8–12	1–13	0–5
4	Slovenia	4–14	12–4	—	4–15	11–5	0–12	2–3
2	Sweden	7–6	13–1	15–4	—	9–0	5–6	4–1
5	Ukraine	2–7	12–8	5–11	0–9	—	1–9	1–4
1	United States	8–3	13–1	12–0	6–5	9–1	—	5–0

Group C Round Robin Summary Table
Pos.	Country	Brazil	China	Japan	Latvia	New Zealand	Turkey	Record
6	Brazil	—	3–10	1–11	3–6	5–12	5–10	0–5
1	China	10–3	—	7–5	8–5	12–4	13–4	5–0
2	Japan	11–1	5–7	—	5–4	11–2	9–5	4–1
3	Latvia	6–3	5–8	4–5	—	9–4	10–1	3–2
5	New Zealand	12–5	4–12	2–11	4–9	—	3–6	1–4
4	Turkey	10–5	4–13	5–9	1–10	6–3	—	2–3

Group D Round Robin Summary Table
Pos.	Country	Austria	Denmark	Germany	Italy	Kazakhstan	Switzerland	Record
4	Austria	—	4–11	5–9	6–5	W–L	3–9	2–3
1	Denmark	11–4	—	9–4	13–3	15–3	3–6	4–1
2	Germany	9–5	4–9	—	8–2	8–4	9–6	4–1
6	Italy	5–6	3–13	2–8	—	2–10	2–7	0–5
5	Kazakhstan	L–W	3–15	4–8	10–2	—	1–9	1–4
3	Switzerland	9–3	6–3	6–9	7–2	9–1	—	4–1

== Round robin results ==
All draws are listed in Korea Standard Time (UTC+09:00).

=== Draw 1 ===
Friday, January 26, 18:00

Sheet A	1	2	3	4	5	6	7	8	Final
Austria (Müller / Heinisch)	0	2	0	0	1	0	1	1	5
Germany (Sutor / Angrick)	2	0	3	3	0	1	0	0	9

Sheet B	1	2	3	4	5	6	7	8	Final
Sweden (Roxin / Meyerson)	0	0	0	1	4	1	0	1	7
Norway (Hausstaetter / Svorkmo Lundberg)	1	1	1	0	0	0	3	0	6

Sheet C	1	2	3	4	5	6	7	8	Final
Italy (Maioni / Nichelatti)	0	1	0	0	1	0	0	X	2
Switzerland (Haehlen / Caccivio)	1	0	3	1	0	1	1	X	7

Sheet D	1	2	3	4	5	6	7	8	Final
Nigeria (Akinsanya / Daniel)	0	0	2	0	0	0	1	X	3
Hungary (Nagy / Kárász)	4	1	0	5	2	1	0	X	13

=== Draw 2 ===
Saturday, January 27, 10:00

Sheet A	1	2	3	4	5	6	7	8	Final
Canada (Locke / Perry)	3	2	0	3	0	1	0	X	9
South Korea (Lee / Lee)	0	0	1	0	1	0	3	X	5

Sheet B	1	2	3	4	5	6	7	8	Final
Czech Republic (Zelingrová / Bláha)	1	1	1	0	2	0	1	1	7
Hungary (Nagy / Kárász)	0	0	0	1	0	1	0	0	2

Sheet C	1	2	3	4	5	6	7	8	Final
Great Britain (Soutar / Brewster)	5	2	1	5	3	2	X	X	18
Nigeria (Akinsanya / Daniel)	0	0	0	0	0	0	X	X	0

Sheet D	1	2	3	4	5	6	7	8	Final
Italy (Maioni / Nichelatti)	0	3	0	0	0	0	X	X	3
Denmark (Schmidt / Schmidt)	2	0	4	4	2	1	X	X	13

=== Draw 3 ===
Saturday, January 27, 14:00

Sheet A	1	2	3	4	5	6	7	8	Final
Norway (Hausstaetter / Svorkmo Lundberg)	3	2	1	3	4	2	X	X	15
Qatar (Al-Fahad / Alnaimi)	0	0	0	0	0	0	X	X	0

Sheet B	1	2	3	4	5	6	7	8	Final
Slovenia (Kavčič / Omerzel)	1	0	4	0	3	2	1	X	11
Ukraine (Lytvynenko / Shlyk)	0	1	0	4	0	0	0	X	5

Sheet C	1	2	3	4	5	6	7	8	Final
United States (Wendling / Paral)	1	1	1	0	0	2	0	1	6
Sweden (Roxin / Meyerson)	0	0	0	2	1	0	2	0	5

Sheet D	1	2	3	4	5	6	7	8	Final
Germany (Sutor / Angrick)	0	0	0	4	2	1	2	0	9
Switzerland (Haehlen / Caccivio)	2	1	2	0	0	0	0	1	6

=== Draw 4 ===
Saturday, January 27, 18:00

Sheet A	1	2	3	4	5	6	7	8	Final
China (Gong / Xu)	0	2	1	0	2	2	0	X	7
Japan (Tanaka / Kawai)	1	0	0	2	0	0	2	X	5

Sheet B	1	2	3	4	5	6	7	8	Final
Latvia (Regža / Zass)	1	1	0	4	2	2	X	X	10
Turkey (Ekmekçi / Aybar)	0	0	1	0	0	0	X	X	1

Sheet C	1	2	3	4	5	6	7	8	Final
New Zealand (Russell / Nevill)	2	3	1	0	2	0	4	X	12
Brazil (Gentile / Melo)	0	0	0	1	0	4	0	X	5

Sheet D	1	2	3	4	5	6	7	8	Final
Austria (Müller / Heinisch)	0	0	1	1	0	2	1		W
Kazakhstan (Tastemir / Tastemir)	2	1	0	0	1	0	0	/	L

- Kazakhstan forfeited the game (ran out of time during end 8, 1 stone remaining)

=== Draw 5 ===
Sunday, January 28, 10:00

Sheet A	1	2	3	4	5	6	7	8	Final
Turkey (Ekmekçi / Aybar)	3	0	0	1	1	0	1	X	6
New Zealand (Russell / Nevill)	0	1	1	0	0	1	0	X	3

Sheet B	1	2	3	4	5	6	7	8	Final
Brazil (Gentile / Melo)	0	0	1	0	0	0	X	X	1
Japan (Tanaka / Kawai)	3	2	0	2	3	1	X	X	11

Sheet C	1	2	3	4	5	6	7	8	Final
Latvia (Regža / Zass)	0	0	2	0	1	0	0	2	5
China (Gong / Xu)	3	2	0	1	0	1	1	0	8

Sheet D	1	2	3	4	5	6	7	8	Final
Ukraine (Lytvynenko / Shlyk)	0	0	0	1	0	0	1	X	2
Norway (Hausstaetter / Svorkmo Lundberg)	1	2	2	0	1	1	0	X	7

=== Draw 6 ===
Sunday, January 28, 14:00

Sheet A	1	2	3	4	5	6	7	8	Final
Denmark (Schmidt / Schmidt)	0	0	0	2	0	1	0	0	3
Switzerland (Haehlen / Caccivio)	1	1	1	0	1	0	1	1	6

Sheet B	1	2	3	4	5	6	7	8	Final
Italy (Maioni / Nichelatti)	1	0	1	1	0	2	0	0	5
Austria (Müller / Heinisch)	0	2	0	0	2	0	1	1	6

Sheet C	1	2	3	4	5	6	7	8	Final
Germany (Sutor / Angrick)	1	2	1	3	0	1	0	X	8
Kazakhstan (Tastemir / Tastemir)	0	0	0	0	1	0	3	X	4

Sheet D	1	2	3	4	5	6	7	8	Final
United States (Wendling / Paral)	3	0	3	2	1	3	1	X	13
Qatar (Al-Fahad / Alnaimi)	0	1	0	0	0	0	0	X	1

=== Draw 7 ===
Sunday, January 28, 18:00

Sheet A	1	2	3	4	5	6	7	8	Final
Czech Republic (Zelingrová / Bláha)	1	3	5	2	4	4	X	X	19
Nigeria (Akinsanya / Daniel)	0	0	0	0	0	0	X	X	0

Sheet B	1	2	3	4	5	6	7	8	Final
Hungary (Nagy / Kárász)	0	0	1	0	1	0	3	X	5
Canada (Locke / Perry)	2	1	0	4	0	1	0	X	8

Sheet C	1	2	3	4	5	6	7	8	Final
South Korea (Lee / Lee)	1	2	2	1	0	3	2	X	11
Great Britain (Soutar / Brewster)	0	0	0	0	2	0	0	X	2

Sheet D	1	2	3	4	5	6	7	8	Final
Sweden (Roxin / Meyerson)	0	4	0	4	2	2	3	X	15
Slovenia (Kavčič / Omerzel)	1	0	3	0	0	0	0	X	4

=== Draw 8 ===
Monday, January 29, 10:00

Sheet A	1	2	3	4	5	6	7	8	Final
Germany (Sutor / Angrick)	1	1	0	1	0	5	X	X	8
Italy (Maioni / Nichelatti)	0	0	1	0	1	0	X	X	2

Sheet B	1	2	3	4	5	6	7	8	Final
Switzerland (Haehlen / Caccivio)	3	1	0	1	1	3	X	X	9
Kazakhstan (Tastemir / Tastemir)	0	0	1	0	0	0	X	X	1

Sheet C	1	2	3	4	5	6	7	8	Final
Austria (Müller / Heinisch)	0	2	0	1	0	1	X	X	4
Denmark (Schmidt / Schmidt)	4	0	6	0	1	0	X	X	11

Sheet D	1	2	3	4	5	6	7	8	Final
Turkey (Ekmekçi / Aybar)	0	0	1	1	1	2	0	X	5
Japan (Tanaka / Kawai)	3	2	0	0	0	0	4	X	9

=== Draw 9 ===
Monday, January 29, 14:00

Sheet A	1	2	3	4	5	6	7	8	Final
Nigeria (Akinsanya / Daniel)	0	0	0	0	0	0	0	X	0
Canada (Locke / Perry)	6	1	2	1	1	1	2	X	14

Sheet B	1	2	3	4	5	6	7	8	Final
Great Britain (Soutar / Brewster)	0	0	0	1	1	1	1	4	8
Czech Republic (Zelingrová / Bláha)	1	1	1	0	0	0	0	0	3

Sheet C	1	2	3	4	5	6	7	8	Final
Hungary (Nagy / Kárász)	1	2	1	0	2	0	0	1	7
South Korea (Lee / Lee)	0	0	0	1	0	1	2	0	4

Sheet D	1	2	3	4	5	6	7	8	Final
New Zealand (Russell / Nevill)	0	1	0	1	0	2	0	X	4
Latvia (Regža / Zass)	2	0	2	0	2	0	3	X	9

=== Draw 10 ===
Monday, January 29, 18:00

Sheet A	1	2	3	4	5	6	7	8	Final
Sweden (Roxin / Meyerson)	1	1	2	3	1	1	X	X	9
Ukraine (Lytvynenko / Shlyk)	0	0	0	0	0	0	X	X	0

Sheet B	1	2	3	4	5	6	7	8	Final
Norway (Hausstaetter / Svorkmo Lundberg)	0	1	1	0	0	1	0	X	3
United States (Wendling / Paral)	1	0	0	2	4	0	1	X	8

Sheet C	1	2	3	4	5	6	7	8	Final
Qatar (Al-Fahad / Alnaimi)	0	2	0	0	2	0	0	X	4
Slovenia (Kavčič / Omerzel)	3	0	4	1	0	1	3	X	12

Sheet D	1	2	3	4	5	6	7	8	Final
Brazil (Gentile / Melo)	2	0	0	0	0	1	0	X	3
China (Gong / Xu)	0	2	2	2	1	0	3	X	10

=== Draw 11 ===
Tuesday, January 30, 10:00

Sheet A	1	2	3	4	5	6	7	8	Final
Great Britain (Soutar / Brewster)	4	0	2	1	0	1	0	X	8
Hungary (Nagy / Kárász)	0	1	0	0	2	0	1	X	4

Sheet B	1	2	3	4	5	6	7	8	Final
South Korea (Lee / Lee)	1	3	3	4	0	6	X	X	17
Nigeria (Akinsanya / Daniel)	0	0	0	0	1	0	X	X	1

Sheet C	1	2	3	4	5	6	7	8	Final
Canada (Locke / Perry)	1	0	2	0	0	0	1	0	4
Czech Republic (Zelingrová / Bláha)	0	1	0	2	1	1	0	1	6

Sheet D	1	2	3	4	5	6	7	8	Final
Switzerland (Haehlen / Caccivio)	3	2	0	1	1	0	2	X	9
Austria (Müller / Heinisch)	0	0	1	0	0	2	0	X	3

=== Draw 12 ===
Tuesday, January 30, 14:00

Sheet A	1	2	3	4	5	6	7	8	Final
Ukraine (Lytvynenko / Shlyk)	0	0	0	1	0	0	X	X	1
United States (Wendling / Paral)	2	3	1	0	1	2	X	X	9

Sheet B	1	2	3	4	5	6	7	8	Final
Qatar (Al-Fahad / Alnaimi)	0	0	0	1	0	0	X	X	1
Sweden (Roxin / Meyerson)	2	2	2	0	3	4	X	X	13

Sheet C	1	2	3	4	5	6	7	8	Final
Slovenia (Kavčič / Omerzel)	0	3	0	0	1	0	X	X	4
Norway (Hausstaetter / Svorkmo Lundberg)	4	0	3	2	0	5	X	X	14

Sheet D	1	2	3	4	5	6	7	8	Final
Japan (Tanaka / Kawai)	3	0	1	1	0	4	2	X	11
New Zealand (Russell / Nevill)	0	1	0	0	1	0	0	X	2

=== Draw 13 ===
Tuesday, January 30, 18:00

Sheet A	1	2	3	4	5	6	7	8	Final
Latvia (Regža / Zass)	2	2	0	0	1	1	0	X	6
Brazil (Gentile / Melo)	0	0	1	1	0	0	1	X	3

Sheet B	1	2	3	4	5	6	7	8	Final
Denmark (Schmidt / Schmidt)	2	0	1	3	2	0	1	X	9
Germany (Sutor / Angrick)	0	1	0	0	0	3	0	X	4

Sheet C	1	2	3	4	5	6	7	8	Final
China (Gong / Xu)	5	0	2	2	0	4	X	X	13
Turkey (Ekmekçi / Aybar)	0	2	0	0	2	0	X	X	4

Sheet D	1	2	3	4	5	6	7	8	Final
Kazakhstan (Tastemir / Tastemir)	1	2	3	0	4	0	X	X	10
Italy (Maioni / Nichelatti)	0	0	0	1	0	1	X	X	2

=== Draw 14 ===
Wednesday, January 31, 9:00

Sheet A	1	2	3	4	5	6	7	8	Final
United States (Wendling / Paral)	1	2	3	1	2	3	X	X	12
Slovenia (Kavčič / Omerzel)	0	0	0	0	0	0	X	X	0

Sheet B	1	2	3	4	5	6	7	8	Final
New Zealand (Russell / Nevill)	0	0	3	0	1	0	X	X	4
China (Gong / Xu)	6	3	0	1	0	2	X	X	12

Sheet C	1	2	3	4	5	6	7	8	Final
Ukraine (Lytvynenko / Shlyk)	0	4	0	5	2	0	0	1	12
Qatar (Al-Fahad / Alnaimi)	3	0	3	0	0	1	1	0	8

Sheet D	1	2	3	4	5	6	7	8	Final
Czech Republic (Zelingrová / Bláha)	2	2	0	0	2	0	0	1	7
South Korea (Lee / Lee)	0	0	1	1	0	1	2	0	5

=== Draw 15 ===
Wednesday, January 31, 12:30

Sheet A	1	2	3	4	5	6	7	8	Final
Brazil (Gentile / Melo)	0	1	1	0	2	1	0	X	5
Turkey (Ekmekçi / Aybar)	3	0	0	3	0	0	4	X	10

Sheet B	1	2	3	4	5	6	7	8	Final
Kazakhstan (Tastemir / Tastemir)	0	0	0	0	3	0	X	X	3
Denmark (Schmidt / Schmidt)	4	1	3	1	0	6	X	X	15

Sheet C	1	2	3	4	5	6	7	8	Final
Japan (Tanaka / Kawai)	0	1	1	0	1	0	1	1	5
Latvia (Regža / Zass)	2	0	0	1	0	1	0	0	4

Sheet D	1	2	3	4	5	6	7	8	Final
Canada (Locke / Perry)	0	2	0	0	2	0	2	0	6
Great Britain (Soutar / Brewster)	1	0	1	1	0	1	0	3	7

== Playoffs ==
Quarterfinals
A1	Great Britain	7
D2	Germany	5
C1	China	6
B2	Sweden	9
B1	United States	8
A2	Czech Republic	7
D1	Denmark	9
C2	Japan	7

Semifinals
A1	Great Britain	6
B2	Sweden	5
B1	United States	5
D1	Denmark	6

Gold medal game
A1	' Great Britain	7
D1	Denmark	6
Bronze medal game
B2	Sweden	4
B1	United States	7

=== Quarterfinals ===
Wednesday, January 31, 19:00

Sheet A	1	2	3	4	5	6	7	8	Final
China (Gong / Xu)	0	2	0	0	1	0	3	0	6
Sweden (Roxin / Meyerson)	4	0	1	1	0	2	0	1	9

Sheet B	1	2	3	4	5	6	7	8	Final
Great Britain (Soutar / Brewster)	2	0	2	0	0	2	0	1	7
Germany (Sutor / Angrick)	0	1	0	1	1	0	2	0	5

Sheet C	1	2	3	4	5	6	7	8	Final
United States (Wendling / Paral)	1	0	0	0	2	1	0	4	8
Czech Republic (Zelingrová / Bláha)	0	1	1	1	0	0	4	0	7

Sheet D	1	2	3	4	5	6	7	8	Final
Denmark (Schmidt / Schmidt)	0	0	4	2	0	0	3	0	9
Japan (Tanaka / Kawai)	1	1	0	0	3	1	0	1	7

=== Semifinals ===
Thursday, February 1, 9:00

Sheet A	1	2	3	4	5	6	7	8	Final
United States (Wendling / Paral)	1	0	1	1	0	1	1	0	5
Denmark (Schmidt / Schmidt)	0	2	0	0	3	0	0	1	6

Sheet C	1	2	3	4	5	6	7	8	Final
Great Britain (Soutar / Brewster)	1	1	1	0	0	2	0	1	6
Sweden (Roxin / Meyerson)	0	0	0	2	1	0	2	0	5

=== Bronze medal game ===
Thursday, February 1, 13:00

Sheet B	1	2	3	4	5	6	7	8	9	Final
Sweden (Roxin / Meyerson)	1	0	1	1	1	0	0	0	0	4
United States (Wendling / Paral)	0	1	0	0	0	1	1	1	3	7

=== Gold medal game ===
Thursday, February 1, 16:00

Sheet B	1	2	3	4	5	6	7	8	Final
Great Britain (Soutar / Brewster)	2	1	0	0	3	0	1	0	7
Denmark (Schmidt / Schmidt)	0	0	2	2	0	1	0	1	6

== Final standings ==
Place	Team
1st place, gold medalist(s)	Great Britain
2nd place, silver medalist(s)	Denmark
3rd place, bronze medalist(s)	United States
4	Sweden
5	China
6	Germany
7	Japan
8	Czech Republic
9	Norway
10	Canada
11	Latvia
12	Switzerland

Place	Team
13	Austria
14	Hungary
15	Turkey
16	Slovenia
17	South Korea
18	Kazakhstan
19	Ukraine
20	New Zealand
21	Italy
22	Brazil
23	Qatar
24	Nigeria
