= Speed skating at the 2024 Winter Youth Olympics – Men's 1500 metres =

Men's 1500 metres at the IV Winter Youth Olympic Games
- Venue: Gangneung Oval
- Date: 23 January
- Competitors: 31 from 18 nations
- Winning time: 1:50.53

Medalists
1st place, gold medalist(s)		Finn Sonnekalb	Germany
2nd place, silver medalist(s)		Pan Baoshuo	China
3rd place, bronze medalist(s)		Sota Kubo	Japan

The men's 1500 metres speed skating competition of the 2024 Winter Youth Olympics was held at the Gangneung Oval on 23 January 2024.

== Results ==
The races were started at 12:51.

Rank	Pair	Lane	Name	Country	Time	Time Behind
1st place, gold medalist(s)	15	i	Finn Sonnekalb	Germany	1:50.53	
2nd place, silver medalist(s)	14	o	Pan Baoshuo	China	1:52.84	+2.31
3rd place, bronze medalist(s)	16	o	Sota Kubo	Japan	1:53.16	+2.63
4	14	i	Eirik Andersen	Norway	1:54.04	+3.51
5	15	o	Takumi Murashita	Japan	1:54.30	+3.77
6	11	i	Max Weber	United States	1:54.893	+4.36
7	16	i	Sem Spruit	Netherlands	1:54.894	+4.36
8	8	i	Ruslan Zhanadilov	Kazakhstan	1:55.67	+5.14
9	10	o	Lorenzo Minari	Italy	1:55.75	+5.22
10	11	o	Heo Se-ok	South Korea	1:55.78	+5.25
11	13	o	Zhang Wanli	China	1:56.34	+5.81
12	12	o	Geophrey Coenraad	Netherlands	1:56.40	+5.87
13	13	i	Miika Johan Klevstuen	Norway	1:57.18	+6.65
14	12	i	Liam Kitchel	United States	1:58.01	+7.48
15	9	o	John Bernardi	Italy	1:58.06	+7.53
16	10	i	Shin Seo-nung	South Korea	1:58.52	+7.99
17	6	i	Mikhail Matryukhin	Kazakhstan	2:01.60	+11.07
18	7	i	Krzysztof Galach	Poland	2:01.88	+11.35
19	7	o	Sergio Álvarez Fernandez	Spain	2:02.11	+11.58
20	9	i	Leo Huber	Germany	2:02.30	+11.77
21	5	o	Vlad Popa	Romania	2:02.32	+11.79
22	5	i	Nevio Gross	Switzerland	2:02.40	+11.87
23	6	o	Gustavs Vācietis	Latvia	2:02.64	+12.11
24	8	o	Szymon Hostyński	Poland	2:03.38	+12.85
25	4	o	Manuel Piteira	Portugal	2:06.36	+15.83
26	3	o	Tudor Debu	Romania	2:08.14	+17.61
27	4	i	Christopher López Osorio	Spain	2:08.29	+17.76
28	1	i	Sten Talumaa	Estonia	2:09.09	+18.56
29	2	i	Martim Vieira	Portugal	2:09.50	+18.97
30	3	i	Eeka Rintala	Finland	2:12.74	+22.21
31	2	o	Paul Wörle	Austria	2:12.95	+22.42
