= Puerto Rico at the 2024 Winter Youth Olympics =

- Flag of Puerto Rico
- IOC code: PUR
- NOC: Puerto Rican Olympic Committee

in Gangwon, South Korea 19 January 2024 – 1 February 2024
- Competitors: 1 in 1 sport
- Flag bearer (opening): Isabela Aponte
- Flag bearer (closing): TBD
- Medals: Gold 0 Silver 0 Bronze 0 Total 0

Winter Youth Olympics appearances
- 2024

Puerto Rico competed at the 2024 Winter Youth Olympics in Gangwon, South Korea, from January 19 to February 1, 2024. This was Puerto Rico's debut appearance at the Winter Youth Olympic Games.

The Puerto Rican team consisted of one female luger. Luger Isabela Aponte was the country's flagbearer during the opening ceremony.

== Competitors ==
The following is the list of number of competitors (per gender) participating at the games per sport/discipline.

Sport	Men	Women	Total
Luge	0	1	1
Total	0	1	1

== Luge ==
Puerto Rico qualified one female luger. Isabela Aponte would go onto finish 30th in the women's luge event (last among sleds who completed the event).

Athlete	Event	Run 1		Run 2		Total	
Athlete	Event	Time	Rank	Time	Rank	Time	Rank
Isabela Aponte	Women's singles	53.328	31	51.854	29	1:45.182	30

== See also ==
- Puerto Rico at the 2024 Summer Olympics
