= Ukraine at the 2024 Winter Youth Olympics =

- Flag of Ukraine
- IOC code: UKR
- NOC: National Olympic Committee of Ukraine

in Gangwon, South Korea 19 January 2024 – 1 February 2024
- Competitors: 44 in 12 sports
- Flag bearers (opening): Yaroslav Lavreniuk & Valeriia Sheihas
- Flag bearer (closing): TBD
- Medals Ranked 26th: Gold 0 Silver 1 Bronze 1 Total 2

Winter Youth Olympics appearances (overview)
- 2012; 2016; 2020; 2024

Ukraine competed at the 2024 Winter Youth Olympics in Gangwon, South Korea, from January 19 to February 1, 2024. It was Ukraine's fourth appearance at the Winter Youth Olympic Games, after the country had competed at every Games since the inaugural edition in 2012.

Skeleton athlete Yaroslav Lavreniuk & biathlete Valeriia Sheihas were the country's flagbearers during the opening ceremony.

Ukraine was represented in 12 out of 15 sports, except for ice hockey, bobsleigh, and speed skating. Ukraine debuted in curling, which in general was Olympic debut for the country in this sport.

Sofia Shkatula represented Ukraine at the 2026 Winter Olympics.

== Competitors ==
The following is the list of number of competitors (per gender) participating at the games per sport/discipline.

Sport	Boys	Girls	Total
Alpine skiing	1	1	2
Biathlon	4	4	8
Cross-country skiing	2	2	4
Curling	1	1	2
Figure skating	2	1	3
Freestyle skiing	1	3	4
Luge	5	4	9
Nordic combined	2	0	2
Short track speed skating	1	2	3
Skeleton	2	0	2
Ski jumping	2	2	4
Snowboarding	1	0	1
Total	24	20	44

== Medalists ==
Medal	Name	Sport	Event	Date
Silver	Yaroslav Lavreniuk	Skeleton	Men's	23 January
Bronze	Polina Putsko	Biathlon	Women's sprint	23 January

== Alpine skiing ==
Athlete	Event	Run 1		Run 2		Total	
Athlete	Event	Time	Rank	Time	Rank	Time	Rank
Oleksandr Patsahan	Boys' super-G	—N/a				59.41	44
Oleksandr Patsahan	Boys' combined	59.48	47	1:01.69	31	2:01.17	32
Oleksandr Patsahan	Boys' giant slalom	55.14	52	DNF2			
Oleksandr Patsahan	Boys' slalom	53.10	46	59.75	33	1:52.85	32
Mariia Sorokmaniuk	Girls' super-G	—N/a				1:01.84	46
Mariia Sorokmaniuk	Girls' combined	1:05.32	51	1:01.29	30	2:06.61	33
Mariia Sorokmaniuk	Girls' giant slalom	DNF1					
Mariia Sorokmaniuk	Girls' slalom	1:00.85	49	DNF2			

== Biathlon ==
Boys

Athlete	Event	Time	Misses	Rank
Ivan Steblyna	Sprint	24:33.1	4 (2+2)	47
Ivan Steblyna	Individual	49:49.2	8 (3+3+2+0)	57
Oleksandr Bilanenko	Sprint	22:41.9	3 (1+2)	12
Oleksandr Bilanenko	Individual	46:08.0	6 (2+1+1+2)	24
Dmytro Kriukov	Sprint	24:37.2	4 (2+2)	51
Dmytro Kriukov	Individual	45:36.6	4 (1+0+2+1)	19
Oleksandr Holik	Sprint	26:37.6	4 (2+2)	76
Oleksandr Holik	Individual	50:18.2	6 (0+1+3+2)	63

Girls

Athlete	Event	Time	Misses	Rank
Valeriia Sheihas	Sprint	21:32.0	2 (0+2)	12
Valeriia Sheihas	Individual	42:09.8	4 (0+2+1+1)	23
Alina Khmil	Sprint	DNS		
Alina Khmil	Individual	40:06.4	2 (0+2+0+0)	11
Polina Putsko	Sprint	20:54.1	1 (0+1)	3rd place, bronze medalist(s)
Polina Putsko	Individual	40:56.4	4 (1+1+0+2)	17
Iryna Shevchenko	Sprint	22:09.8	3 (1+2)	23
Iryna Shevchenko	Individual	40:35.9	3 (0+2+0+1)	12

Mixed

Athletes	Event	Time	Misses	Rank
Iryna Shevchenko; Oleksandr Bilanenko	Single mixed relay	46:41.6	3+15	6
Valeriia Sheihas; Polina Putsko; Dmytro Kriukov; Oleksandr Bilanenko	Mixed relay	1:23:24.2	5+15	9

== Cross-country skiing ==
Ukraine qualified four cross-country skiers (two per gender).

Distance

Athlete	Event	Time	Difference	Rank
Bohdan Nikulin	Boys' 7.5 kilometre classical	21:27.2	+1:40.0	32
Nazarii Teselskyi	Boys' 7.5 kilometre classical	21:30.2	+1:43.0	33
Sofiia Shkatula	Girls' 7.5 kilometre classical	24:04.8	+1:45.2	24
Mariia Pavlenko	Girls' 7.5 kilometre classical	24:55.7	+2:36.1	34

Sprint

Athlete	Event	Qualification		Quarterfinal		Semifinal		Final	
Athlete	Event	Time	Rank	Time	Rank	Time	Rank	Time	Rank
Bohdan Nikulin	Boys' sprint	3:12.27	26 Q	3:13.93	5	Did not advance			
Nazarii Teselskyi	Boys' sprint	3:18.93	38	Did not advance					
Sofiia Shkatula	Girls' sprint	3:52.19	36	Did not advance					
Mariia Pavlenko	Girls' sprint	3:55.51	41	Did not advance					

Mixed

Athletes	Event	Time	Difference	Rank
Mariia Pavlenko; Sofiia Shkatula; Nazarii Teselskyi; Bohdan Nikulin	Mixed relay	57:13.4	+4:06.1	12

== Curling ==
Ukraine qualified a mixed doubles pair for a total of two athletes (one per gender).

Summary

Team	Event	Group Stage						Quarterfinal	Semifinal	Final / BM	
Team	Event	Opposition Score	Opposition Score	Opposition Score	Opposition Score	Opposition Score	Rank	Opposition Score	Opposition Score	Opposition Score	Rank
Marharyta Lytvynenko; Artem Shlyk	Mixed doubles	Slovenia; L 5–11	Norway; L 2–7	Sweden; L 0–9	United States; L 1–9	Qatar; W 12–8	5	Did not advance			19

=== Mixed doubles ===
Group B	W	L	W–L	DSC
United States	5	0	–	61.18
Sweden	4	1	–	78.69
Norway	3	2	–	34.37
Slovenia	2	3	–	112.84
Ukraine	1	4	–	74.81
Qatar	0	5	–	155.39

Round robin

Draw 3

Saturday, January 27, 14:00

Sheet B	1	2	3	4	5	6	7	8	Final
Slovenia (Kavčič / Omerzel)	1	0	4	0	3	2	1	X	11
Ukraine (Lytvynenko / Shlyk) 🔨	0	1	0	4	0	0	0	X	5

Draw 5

Sunday, January 28, 10:00

Sheet D	1	2	3	4	5	6	7	8	Final
Ukraine (Lytvynenko / Shlyk) 🔨	0	0	0	1	0	0	1	X	2
Norway (Hausstaetter / Svorkmo Lundberg)	1	2	2	0	1	1	0	X	7

Draw 10

Monday, January 29, 18:00

Sheet A	1	2	3	4	5	6	7	8	Final
Sweden (Roxin / Meyerson) 🔨	1	1	2	3	1	1	X	X	9
Ukraine (Lytvynenko / Shlyk)	0	0	0	0	0	0	X	X	0

Draw 12

Tuesday, January 30, 14:00

Sheet A	1	2	3	4	5	6	7	8	Final
Ukraine (Lytvynenko / Shlyk)	0	0	0	1	0	0	X	X	1
United States (Wendling / Paral) 🔨	2	3	1	0	1	2	X	X	9

Draw 14

Wednesday, January 31, 9:00

Sheet C	1	2	3	4	5	6	7	8	Final
Ukraine (Lytvynenko / Shlyk) 🔨	0	4	0	5	2	0	0	1	12
Qatar (Al-Fahad / Alnaimi)	3	0	3	0	0	1	1	0	8

== Figure skating ==
Athletes	Event	SP/SD		FS/FD		Total	
Athletes	Event	Points	Rank	Points	Rank	Points	Rank
Vadym Novikov	Men's singles	54.91	14 Q	105.73	14	160.64	14
Sofiia Rekunova / Denys Fediakin	Ice dance	35.76	11 Q	57.45	11	93.21	11

== Freestyle skiing ==
Dual moguls

Athlete	Event	Panel		Semifinal	Final / Bronze final	Rank
Athlete	Event	Score	Rank	Semifinal	Final / Bronze final	Rank
Dmytro Perets	Boys' dual moguls	8	5	Did not advance		=17
Yuliana Kysil	Girls' dual moguls	8	5	Did not advance		=17

Mixed team dual moguls

Athlete	Event	1/8 final	Quarterfinal	Semifinal	Final / Bronze final	Rank
Dmytro Perets; Yuliana Kysil	Mixed team dual moguls	United States 2 Abby McLarnon; Jiah Cohen; 2–68	Did not advance			

Slopestyle and big air

Athlete	Event	Qualification				Final				
Athlete	Event	Run 1	Run 2	Best score	Rank	Run 1	Run 2	Run 3	Final score	Rank
Mariia Aniichyn	Girls' slopestyle	5.25	19.75	19.75	18	Did not advance				
Mariia Aniichyn	Girls' big air	66.00	49.00	66.00	9 Q	75.00	37.00	39.75	114.75	8
Nataliia Kaziuk	Girls' slopestyle	DNS								
Nataliia Kaziuk	Girls' big air	64.50	7.75	64.50	10 Q	58.00	61.25	28.50	89.75	9

== Luge ==
Ukraine qualified nine lugers which is the biggest luge team in the history of Ukraine's participation in the Winter Youth Games so far.

Boys

Athlete	Event	Run 1		Run 2		Total	
Athlete	Event	Time	Rank	Time	Rank	Time	Rank
Anton Shevchuk	Singles	47.642	12	47.410	12	1:35.052	12
Maksym Panchuk; Andrii Muts	Doubles	48.903	8	49.117	7	1:38.020	7

Girls

Athlete	Event	Run 1		Run 2		Total	
Athlete	Event	Time	Rank	Time	Rank	Time	Rank
Dariia Nekotienieva	Singles	49.983	20	50.166	22	1:40.149	19
Daryna Fedorchuk	Singles	49.529	17	50.092	21	1:39.621	17
Svitlana Solovei; Anna-Mariia Hartsula	Doubles	49.160	5	49.266	4	1:38.426	5

Mixed team relay

Athlete	Event	Women' singles		Men' singles		Doubles		Total	
Athlete	Event	Time	Rank	Time	Rank	Time	Rank	Time	Rank
Daryna Fedorchuk; Anton Shevchuk; Maksym Panchuk / Andrii Muts	Team relay	50.721	9	50.685	4	52.056	5	2:33.462	5

== Nordic combined ==
Boys

Athlete	Event	Ski jumping			Cross-country		Final result	
Athlete	Event	Points	Rank	Deficit	Time	Rank	Deficit	Rank
Oleksandr Shovkoplias	Men's normal hill/6 km	43.9	30	+6:28	13:14.9	4	+6:19.8	29
Rostyslav Kirashchuk	Men's normal hill/6 km	107.7	14	+2:13	13:15.3	5	+2:05.2	12

== Short track speed skating ==
Ukraine qualified one male and two female short track speed skaters which is the biggest short track speed skating team in the history of Ukraine's participation in the Winter Youth Games so far..

Boys

Athlete	Event	Heat		Quarterfinal		Semifinal		Final	
Athlete	Event	Time	Rank	Time	Rank	Time	Rank	Time	Rank
Volodymyr Melnyk	500 m	44.455	2 Q	44.521	5	Did not advance			
Volodymyr Melnyk	1000 m	1:37.915	4	Did not advance					
Volodymyr Melnyk	1500 m	—N/a		2:23.798	6	Did not advance			

Girls

Athlete	Event	Heat		Quarterfinal		Semifinal		Final	
Athlete	Event	Time	Rank	Time	Rank	Time	Rank	Time	Rank
Veronika Kremer	500 m	48.844	4	Did not advance					
Veronika Kremer	1000 m	1:40.527	4	Did not advance					
Veronika Kremer	1500 m	—N/a		2:44.426	5	Did not advance			
Diana Demochko	500 m	48.370	3	Did not advance					
Diana Demochko	1000 m	1:58.732	4	Did not advance					
Diana Demochko	1500 m	—N/a		2:41.971	4 q	2:41.167	5	Did not advance	

== Skeleton ==
Ukraine qualified two skeleton racers which is the biggest skeleton team in the history of Ukraine's participation in the Winter Youth Games so far.

Athlete	Event	Run 1		Run 2		Total	
Athlete	Event	Time	Rank	Time	Rank	Time	Rank
Yaroslav Lavreniuk	Men's	52.89	3	52.78	2	1:45.67	2nd place, silver medalist(s)
Vladyslav Klymenko	Men's	58.08	20	56.49	16	1:54.57	20

== Ski jumping ==
Ukraine qualified four ski jumpers (two per gender).

Individual

Athlete	Event	First round			Final			Total	
Athlete	Event	Distance	Points	Rank	Distance	Points	Rank	Points	Rank
Mykola Smyk	Boys' normal hill	83.5	65.1	26	84.5	64.7	26	129.8	28
Vasyl Bukhonko	Boys' normal hill	79.5	55.7	31	81.5	58.7	29	114.4	31
Zhanna Hlukhova	Girls' normal hill	81.0	55.4	18	74.0	42.7	23	98.1	21
Daryna Ilchuk	Girls' normal hill	61.5	12.2	30	65.5	21.7	30	33.9	30

Mixed team

Athlete	Event	Total	
Athlete	Event	Points	Rank
Zhanna Hlukhova; Mykola Smyk; Daryna Ilchuk; Vasyl Bukhonko	Mixed team normal hill	413.0	14

== Snowboarding ==
Snowboard cross

Athlete	Event	Group heats		Semifinal	Final
Athlete	Event	Points	Rank	Position	Position
Ivan Ivchatov	Men's snowboard cross	9	13	DNQ	

== See also ==
- Ukraine at the 2024 Summer Olympics
