= Nordic combined at the 2024 Winter Youth Olympics =

Nordic combined at the IV Winter Youth Olympic Games
- Venue: Alpensia Biathlon Centre; Alpensia Ski Jumping Centre
- Dates: 29–31 January
- Competitors: 51 from 15 nations

Nordic combined at the 2024 Winter Youth Olympics took place from 29 to 31 January 2024 at the Alpensia Biathlon Centre and Alpensia Ski Jumping Centre, Daegwallyeong-myeon, South Korea.

== Schedule ==
All times are in KST (UTC+9)

| Date | Time | Event |
|---|---|---|
| 29 January | 11:30 / 15:00 | Women's HS109 / 4 km |
| 29 January | 12:40 / 15:40 | Men's HS109 / 6 km |
| 31 January | 11:32 / 15:30 | Mixed team HS109 / 4 × 3.3 km |

== Medal summary ==
| Rank | Nation | Gold | Silver | Bronze | Total |
|---|---|---|---|---|---|
| 1 | Finland | 2 | 0 | 0 | 2 |
| 2 | Austria | 1 | 0 | 0 | 1 |
| 3 | Slovenia | 0 | 2 | 1 | 3 |
| 4 | Italy | 0 | 1 | 1 | 2 |
| 5 | Germany | 0 | 0 | 1 | 1 |
| Totals (5 entries) | | 3 | 3 | 3 | 9 |

=== Medalists ===
| Event | Gold | | Silver | | Bronze | |
|---|---|---|---|---|---|---|
| Men's individual normal hill/6 km | Andreas Gfrerer; Austria | 13:23.1 | Manuel Senoner; Italy | 13:47.4 | Jonathan Gräbert; Germany | 14:08.2 |
| Women's individual normal hill/4 km | Minja Korhonen; Finland | 10:02.7 | Teja Pavec; Slovenia | 10:49.9 | Tia Malovrh; Slovenia | 11:14.0 |
| Mixed team normal hill/4 × 3.3 km | Finland; Eemeli Kurttila; Heta Hirvonen; Minja Korhonen; Peter Räisänen | 34:09.2 | Slovenia; Aljaž Janhar; Tia Malovrh; Teja Pavec; Lovro Percl Seručnik | 34:23.6 | Italy; Bryan Venturini; Giada Delugan; Anna Senoner; Manuel Senoner | 34:32.4 |

== Qualification ==
NOCs can gain 2 quota places per gender by ranking in the Marc Hodler Trophy at the 2023 Nordic Junior World Ski Championships. Furthermore, the remaining NOCs would get quota places via the 2022–23 FIS Nordic Combined Continental Cup and the 2022–23 FIS Nordic Combined Youth Cup.

=== Summary ===
This is the quota list as of December 18, 2023.

| NOC | Men's | Women's | Total |
|---|---|---|---|
| Austria | 2 | 2 | 4 |
| Czech Republic | 2 | 2 | 4 |
| Estonia | 2 | 0 | 2 |
| Finland | 2 | 2 | 4 |
| France | 2 | 2 | 4 |
| Germany | 2 | 2 | 4 |
| Italy | 2 | 2 | 4 |
| Japan | 2 | 2 | 4 |
| ~~Kazakhstan~~ | ~~1~~ 0 | 0 | 0 |
| Norway | 2 | 2 | 4 |
| Poland | 2 | ~~2~~ 0 | 2 |
| Slovakia | 2 | 0 | 2 |
| Slovenia | 2 | 2 | 4 |
| ~~South Korea~~ | ~~2~~ 0 | ~~2~~ 0 | 0 |
| Switzerland | ~~1~~ 2 | 1 | 3 |
| Ukraine | 2 | 0 | 2 |
| United States | 2 | 2 | 4 |
| Total: 15 NOCs | 30 | 21 | 51 |

=== Next eligible NOC per event ===
A country can be eligible for more than one quota spot per event in the reallocation process. Bolded NOCs have accepted quotas while NOCs with a strike through have already passed.

| Men's | Women's |
|---|---|
| **Switzerland** | |
