= Georgia at the 2024 Winter Youth Olympics =

- Flag of Georgia
- IOC code: GEO
- NOC: Georgian Olympic Committee

in Gangwon, South Korea 19 January 2024 – 1 February 2024
- Competitors: 6 in 3 sports
- Flag bearers (opening): Luka Mikaberidze & Esmiralda Alievi
- Flag bearer (closing): TBD
- Medals: Gold 0 Silver 0 Bronze 0 Total 0

Winter Youth Olympics appearances
- 2012; 2016; 2020; 2024

Georgia is scheduled to compete at the 2024 Winter Youth Olympics in Gangwon, South Korea, from 19 January to 1 February 2024. This will be the Georgia's fourth appearance at the Winter Youth Olympic Games, having competed at every Games since the inaugural edition in 2012.

Luger Luka Mikaberidze and ski jumper Esmiralda Alievi were the country's flagbearers during the opening ceremony.

== Competitors ==
The following is the list of number of competitors (per gender) participating at the games per sport/discipline.

| Sport | Men | Women | Total |
|---|---|---|---|
| Figure skating | 1 | 1 | 2 |
| Luge | 2 | 0 | 2 |
| Ski jumping | 1 | 1 | 2 |
| Total | 4 | 2 | 6 |

== Figure skating ==
| Athlete | Event | SP/SD | | FS/FD | | Total | |
| Athlete | Event | Points | Rank | Points | Rank | Points | Rank |
|---|---|---|---|---|---|---|---|
| Konstantin Supatashvili | Men's singles | 58.48 | 10 | 116.25 | 10 | 174.73 | 11 |
| Inga Gurgenidze | Women's singles | 57.99 | 7 | 115.42 | 6 | 173.41 | 5 |

== Luge ==
Georgia qualified two male lugers.

Men

| Athlete | Event | Run 1 | | Run 2 | | Total | |
| Athlete | Event | Time | Rank | Time | Rank | Time | Rank |
|---|---|---|---|---|---|---|---|
| Saba Khachidze | Singles | 47.485 | 9 | 47.651 | 14 | 1:35.136 | 13 |
| Saba Khachidze; Luka Mikaberidze | Doubles | Did not finish | | Did not start | | | |

== Ski jumping ==
Georgia qualified two ski jumpers (one per gender).

| Athlete | Event | First round | | | Final | | | Total | |
| Athlete | Event | Distance | Points | Rank | Distance | Points | Rank | Points | Rank |
|---|---|---|---|---|---|---|---|---|---|
| Giorgi Diakonovi | Men's normal hill | 63.5 | 23.6 | 39 | 77.5 | 49.3 | 32 | 72.9 | 36 |
| Esmiralda Alievi | Women's normal hill | 33.0 | 0.0 | 31 | 39.0 | 0.0 | 31 | 0.0 | 31 |

== See also ==
- Georgia at the 2024 Summer Olympics
