= Speed skating at the 2024 Winter Youth Olympics – Men's 500 metres =

Men's 500 metres at the IV Winter Youth Olympic Games
- Venue: Gangneung Oval
- Date: 22 January
- Competitors: 31 from 18 nations
- Winning time: 36.61

Medalists
| 1st place, gold medalist(s) | | Finn Sonnekalb | Germany |
| 2nd place, silver medalist(s) | | Miika Johan Klevstuen | Norway |
| 3rd place, bronze medalist(s) | | Shin Seo-nung | South Korea |

The men's 500 metres speed skating competition of the 2024 Winter Youth Olympics was held at the Gangneung Oval on 22 January 2024.

== Results ==
The races were started at 12:04.

| Rank | Pair | Lane | Name | Country | Time | Time Behind |
|---|---|---|---|---|---|---|
| 1st place, gold medalist(s) | 16 | o | Finn Sonnekalb | Germany | 36.61 | |
| 2nd place, silver medalist(s) | 15 | o | Miika Johan Klevstuen | Norway | 36.79 | +0.18 |
| 3rd place, bronze medalist(s) | 13 | i | Shin Seo-nung | South Korea | 37.13 | +0.52 |
| 4 | 12 | i | Sota Kubo | Japan | 37.20 | +0.59 |
| 5 | 15 | i | Takumi Murashita | Japan | 37.23 | +0.62 |
| 6 | 14 | i | Geophrey Coenraad | Netherlands | 37.29 | +0.68 |
| 7 | 14 | o | Szymon Hostyński | Poland | 37.32 | +0.71 |
| 8 | 10 | o | Heo Se-ok | South Korea | 37.507 | +0.89 |
| 9 | 16 | i | Zhang Wanli | China | 37.509 | +0.89 |
| 10 | 11 | o | Pan Baoshuo | China | 37.64 | +1.03 |
| 11 | 11 | i | Max Weber | United States | 37.81 | +1.20 |
| 12 | 12 | o | Eirik Andersen | Norway | 37.90 | +1.29 |
| 13 | 9 | o | Lorenzo Minari | Italy | 37.92 | +1.31 |
| 14 | 8 | i | Ruslan Zhanadilov | Kazakhstan | 38.26 | +1.65 |
| 15 | 8 | o | John Bernardi | Italy | 38.52 | +1.91 |
| 16 | 6 | o | Martim Vieira | Portugal | 38.84 | +2.23 |
| 17 | 13 | o | Liam Kitchel | United States | 38.97 | +2.36 |
| 18 | 7 | o | Mikhail Matryukhin | Kazakhstan | 39.56 | +2.95 |
| 19 | 5 | i | Vlad Popa | Romania | 39.59 | +2.98 |
| 20 | 6 | i | Krzysztof Galach | Poland | 39.73 | +3.12 |
| 21 | 7 | i | Gustavs Vācietis | Latvia | 39.75 | +3.14 |
| 22 | 10 | i | Leo Huber | Germany | 39.77 | +3.16 |
| 23 | 1 | i | Sten Talumaa | Estonia | 39.98 | +3.37 |
| 24 | 5 | o | Christopher López Osorio | Spain | 40.19 | +3.58 |
| 25 | 4 | i | Sergio Álvarez Fernandez | Spain | 40.71 | +4.10 |
| 26 | 2 | i | Manuel Piteira | Portugal | 40.78 | +4.17 |
| 27 | 4 | o | Paul Wörle | Austria | 41.29 | +4.68 |
| 28 | 3 | i | Tudor Debu | Romania | 41.63 | +5.02 |
| 29 | 2 | o | Nevio Gross | Switzerland | 42.03 | +5.42 |
| 30 | 3 | o | Eeka Rintala | Finland | 42.04 | +5.43 |
| 31 | 9 | i | Sem Spruit | Netherlands | 1:12.23 | +35.62 |
