= Nordic combined at the 2024 Winter Youth Olympics – Men's individual normal hill/6 km =

Men's individual normal hill/6 km at the IV Winter Youth Olympic Games
- Venue: Alpensia Ski Jumping Centre; Alpensia Biathlon Centre
- Dates: 29 January
- Competitors: 30 from 15 nations

Medalists
1st place, gold medalist(s)		Andreas Gferer	Austria
2nd place, silver medalist(s)		Manuel Senoner	Italy
3rd place, bronze medalist(s)		Jonathan Gräbert	Germany

The men's individual normal hill/6 km Nordic combined competition at the 2024 Winter Youth Olympics was held on 28 January at the Alpensia Ski Jumping Centre and Alpensia Biathlon Centre.

== Results ==
=== Ski jumping ===
The ski jumping part was held at 12:40.

Rank	Bib	Name	Country	Distance (m)	Points	Time difference
1	21	Andreas Gfrerer	Austria	112.0	141.0	0:00
2	17	Hektor Kapustík	Slovakia	109.0	134.1	+0:28
3	22	Eemeli Kurttila	Finland	107.0	132.6	+0:34
4	6	Manuel Senoner	Italy	105.5	132.2	+0:35
5	11	Johann Unger	Germany	106.0	131.9	+0:36
6	7	David Liegl	Austria	105.0	129.6	+0:46
7	19	Jonathan Gräbert	Germany	102.0	126.8	+0:57
8	18	Lukáš Doležal	Czech Republic	102.0	124.7	+1:05
9	20	Finn Kempf	Switzerland	100.0	120.7	+1:21
10	26	Kacper Jarząbek	Poland	102.5	118.1	+1:32
11	30	Erik Leiråmo	Norway	99.5	113.9	+1:48
12	15	Luc Balland	France	95.5	109.8	+2:05
13	1	Kohtaro Kubota	Japan	93.0	109.1	+2:08
14	9	Rostyslav Kirashchuk	Ukraine	97.5	107.7	+2:13
15	16	Bryan Venturini	Italy	94.5	107.4	+2:14
16	12	Piotr Nowak	Poland	96.0	105.8	+2:21
16	4	Sverre Kumar Lundeby	Norway	95.0	105.8	+2:21
18	29	Karel Pastarus	Estonia	90.5	101.2	+2:39
19	23	Aljaž Janhar	Slovenia	94.0	97.7	+2:53
20	13	Lovro Percl Seručnik	Slovenia	91.0	94.8	+3:05
21	8	Peter Räisänen	Finland	88.0	91.5	+3:18
22	24	Lubin Martin	France	88.5	89.5	+3:26
23	25	Arthur Tirone	United States	87.0	88.3	+3:31
24	10	Noé Kempf	Switzerland	88.0	86.1	+3:40
25	14	Jakub Karkalík	Slovakia	84.0	81.4	+3:58
26	28	Ruka Kudo	Japan	80.0	78.7	+4:09
27	2	Jan Kabeláč	Czech Republic	78.5	67.0	+4:56
28	3	Fred Gustavson	Estonia	77.5	62.6	+5:14
29	5	Anders Giese	United States	69.5	57.1	+5:36
30	27	Oleksandr Shovkoplias	Ukraine	72.0	43.9	+6:28

=== Cross-country ===
The cross-country part was held at 15:40.

Rank	Bib	Name	Country	Start time	Cross-country time	Cross-country rank	Finish time	Deficit
1st place, gold medalist(s)	1	Andreas Gfrerer	Austria	0:00	13:23.1	8	13:23.1	
2nd place, silver medalist(s)	2	Manuel Senoner	Italy	0:35	13:12.4	3	13:47.4	+24.3
3rd place, bronze medalist(s)	3	Jonathan Gräbert	Germany	0:57	13:11.2	2	14:08.2	+45.1
4	4	David Liegl	Austria	0:46	13:22.5	7	14:08.5	+45.4
5	5	Johann Unger	Germany	0:36	13:47.2	18	14:23.2	+1:00.1
6	6	Lukáš Doležal	Czech Republic	1:05	13:18.8	6	14:23.8	+1:00.7
7	7	Eemeli Kurttila	Finland	0:34	14:09.1	23	14:43.1	+1:20.0
8	8	Finn Kempf	Switzerland	1:21	13:39.7	17	15:00.7	+1:37.6
9	9	Erik Leiråmo	Norway	1:48	13:30.4	14	15:18.4	+1:55.3
10	10	Kacper Jarząbek	Poland	1:32	13:50.7	19	15:22.7	+1:59.6
11	10	Hektor Kapustík	Slovakia	0:28	14:57.4	30	15:25.4	+2:02.3
12	10	Rostyslav Kirashchuk	Ukraine	2:13	13:15.3	5	15:28.3	+2:05.2
13	10	Kohtaro Kubota	Japan	2:08	13:31.0	15	15:39.0	+2:15.9
14	10	Bryan Venturini	Italy	2:14	13:29.2	13	15:43.2	+2:20.1
15	15	Sverre Kumar Lundeby	Norway	2:21	13:28.5	11	15:49.5	+2:26.4
16	16	Luc Balland	France	2:05	14:02.8	21	16:07.8	+2:44.7
17	17	Lubin Martin	France	3:26	12:46.6	1	16:12.6	+2:49.5
18	18	Peter Räisänen	Finland	3:18	13:26.9	10	16:44.9	+3:21.8
19	19	Piotr Nowak	Poland	2:21	14:24:8	25	16:45.8	+3:22.7
20	20	Noé Kempf	Switzerland	3:40	13:23.6	9	17:03.6	+3:40.5
21	21	Lovro Percl Seručnik	Slovenia	3:05	14:02.4	20	17:07.4	+3:44.3
22	22	Arthur Tirone	United States	3:31	13:28.3	16	17:09.3	+3:46.2
23	23	Karel Pastarus	Estonia	2:39	14:44.7	29	17:23.7	+4:00.6
24	24	Aljaž Janhar	Slovenia	2:53	14:39.9	27	17:32.9	+4:09.8
25	26	Ruka Kudo	Japan	4:09	14:13.8	24	18:22.8	+4:59.7
26	27	Jan Kabeláč	Czech Republic	4:56	13:28.6	12	18:24.6	+5:01.5
27	25	Jakub Karkalík	Slovakia	3:58	14:43.0	28	18:41.0	+5:17.9
28	29	Anders Giese	United States	5:36	14:04.2	22	19:40.2	+6:17.1
29	30	Oleksandr Shovkoplias	Ukraine	6:28	13:14.9	4	19:42.9	+6:19.8
30	28	Fred Gustavson	Estonia	5:14	14:35.5	26	19:49.5	+6:26.4
