= Olympic Sliding Centre =

Sports venue in Daegwallyeong, South Korea

- 올림픽 슬라이딩 센터
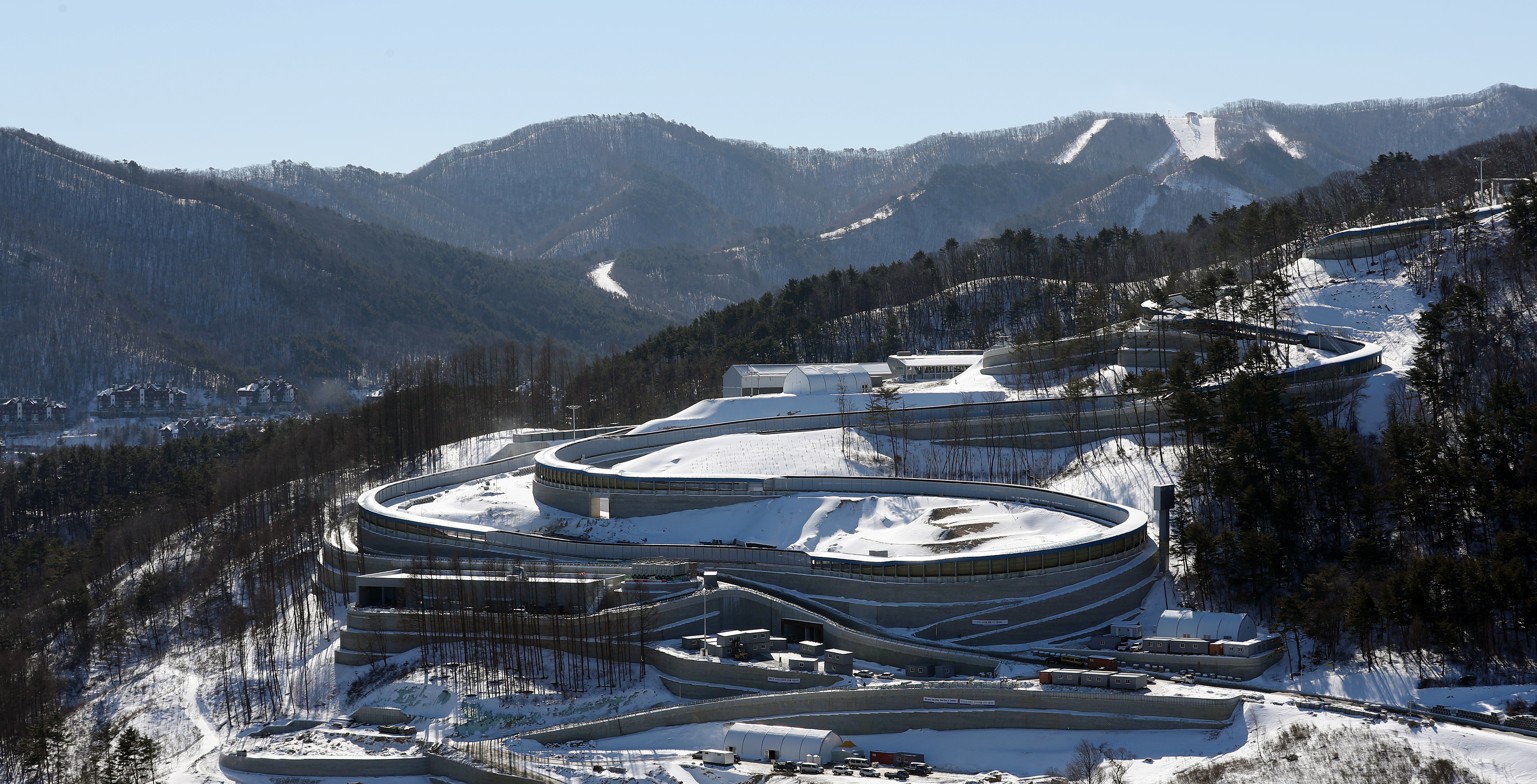
- View of the track
- Interactive map of Olympic Sliding Centre
- Location: Daegwallyeong, South Korea
- Coordinates: 37°39′13″N 128°40′53″E
- Capacity: Total: 7,000; Seated: 1,000; Standing: 6,000

Construction
- Groundbreaking: 4 March 2014
- Cost: ₩ 122.8 billion
- Main contractor: Daelim Inc

Website
- Track Website

The Olympic Sliding Centre (Korean: 올림픽 슬라이딩 센터) is a bobsleigh, luge, and skeleton track that is located in Daegwallyeong, Pyeongchang, South Korea. The centre is located between the Alpensia and Yongpyong Resort. The venue is one of only two operating sliding facilities in Asia, along with the Spiral in Japan.

It was renamed from Alpensia Sliding Centre to Olympic Sliding Centre in June 2017.

== Championships hosted ==
- 2016–2017 Luge, Skeleton, and Bobsleigh World Cups
- 2018 Olympic Luge, Skeleton, and Bobsleigh

== Track technical details ==
=== Construction ===
The venue was built by Daelim under the responsibility of the Gangwon Province. The construction cost ₩122.8 billion (about US$114.5 million), to be shared between the country and the regional authorities: National Government ₩92.1 billion, Local Government ₩30.7 billion.

The construction of the Alpensia Sliding Centre started in March 2014 and was completed in the final months of 2017.

=== Characteristics ===
It occupies a surface of 177,000 square metres (44 acres), and has a range in altitude from 940 m (3,080 ft) above sea level at the top of the track down to 800 metres (2,600 ft) above sea level at finish line. The track itself is 2,018 metres (6,621 ft) long (to commemorate the Olympics), and is 1.40 metres (4.6 ft) wide. The venue can also hold 7,000 attendants, with 1,000 seats and standing room for the remaining 6,000.

== 2018 Winter Olympics ==
During coverage of the Games on NBC Sports in the United States, the track was referred to as "The House of Speed" while turns 9-12 were referred to as "Run Breaker" for the fact they slowed down the sleds so much that it costs sliders positions, including medals. The best known example was Germany's Felix Loch who was leading after three runs in the luge men's singles event only to have problems during the final run through "Run Breaker", causing the two-time defending Olympic champion to finish 5th.

Turn 2 was named 'Soju' by sliders, after the local Korean liquor, because "it messes you up."

During the Games, the Turn 9-10-11 sequence was christened the name "The Dragon's Tail". Tweak the Dragon's Tail and you'll pay the price. Other Dragon-based names appeared in the Downhill and Slalom courses, reflecting the importance of the Dragon in Korean mythology.

Turn 14 was named The Olympic Curve - inspired by the PyeongChang 2018 logo, set in the ice.

== Track Records ==
Track records
Event		Record	Athlete(s)	Date	Time (s)	Ref
Bobsleigh	Two-man	Start	Francesco Friedrich & Thorsten Margis (GER)	18 February 2018	4.85	
Bobsleigh	Two-man	Track	Francesco Friedrich & Thorsten Margis (GER)	19 February 2018	48.96	
Bobsleigh	Four-man	Start	Justin Kripps, Jesse Lumsden, Alexander Kopacz & Oluseyi Smith (CAN)	25 February 2018	4.80	
Bobsleigh	Four-man	Track	Francesco Friedrich, Candy Bauer, Martin Grothkopp & Thorsten Margis (GER)	24 February 2018	48.54	
Bobsleigh	Two-woman	Start	Elana Meyers Taylor & Lauren Gibbs (USA)	20 February 2018	5.21	
Bobsleigh	Two-woman	Track	Elana Meyers Taylor & Lauren Gibbs (USA)	21 February 2018	50.46	
Skeleton	Men's	Start	Yun Sung-bin (KOR)	15 February 2018	4.59	
Skeleton	Men's	Track	Yun Sung-bin (KOR)	16 February 2018	50.02	
Skeleton	Women's	Start	Elena Nikitina (RUS)	17 March 2017	4.92	
Skeleton	Women's	Track	Lizzy Yarnold (GBR)	17 February 2018	51.46	
Luge	Men's Singles	Start	Tucker West (USA)	10 February 2018	2.545	
Luge	Men's Singles	Track	Dominik Fischnaller (ITA)	11 February 2018	47.475	
Luge	Women's Singles	Start	Tatjana Hüfner (GER)	12 February 2018	4.302	
Luge	Women's Singles	Track	Summer Britcher (USA)	12 February 2018	46.132	
Luge	Men's Doubles	Start	Tobias Wendl & Tobias Arlt (GER)	14 February 2018	4.174	
Luge	Men's Doubles	Track	Tobias Wendl & Tobias Arlt (GER)	14 February 2018	45.820	
