= Short-track speed skating at the 2024 Winter Youth Olympics – Men's 1000 metres =

Men's 1000 metres at the IV Winter Youth Olympic Games
- Venue: Gangneung Ice Arena
- Dates: 21 January
- Competitors: 36 from 23 nations
- Winning time: 1:26.257

Medalists
1st place, gold medalist(s)		Zhang Xinzhe	China
2nd place, silver medalist(s)		Muhammed Bozdağ	Turkey
3rd place, bronze medalist(s)		Raito Kida	Japan

The men's 1000 metres in short track speed skating at the 2024 Winter Youth Olympics was held on 21 January at the Gangneung Ice Arena.

== Results ==
=== Heats ===
Q – qualified for the quarterfinals

Rank	Heat	Name	Country	Time	Notes
1	1	Victor Chartrand	Canada	1:33.485	Q
2	1	Daniele Zampedri	Italy	1:33.547	Q
3	1	Krzysztof Mądry	Poland	1:56.256	ADV
4	1	Dávid Keszthelyi	Hungary	2:00.035	
1	2	Peter Groseclose	Philippines	1:30.243	Q
2	2	Muhammed Bozdağ	Turkey	1:30.409	Q
3	2	Moritz Hartmann	Germany	1:31.017	
4	2	Nikolas Toskov	Bulgaria	1:38.221	
1	3	Lucas Koo	Brazil	1:34.103	Q
2	3	Nick Endeveld	Netherlands	1:49.769	Q
3	3	Tymeo Libeau	France	1:50.737	ADV
	3	Julius Kazanecki	United States	PEN	
1	4	Zhang Xinzhe	China	1:34.407	Q
2	4	Sean Shuai	United States	1:34.520	Q
3	4	Jonas de Jong	Netherlands	1:35.691	
4	4	Aditya Nghiem	Australia	1:43.999	
1	5	Dominik Major	Hungary	1:38.237	Q
2	5	Asen Gyurov	Bulgaria	1:38.550	Q
3	5	Toprak Efe Eroğlu	Turkey	1:39.770	
4	5	Lowie Dekens	Belgium	1:41.848	
1	6	Kim You-sung	South Korea	1:32.293	Q
2	6	Luka Jašić	Serbia	1:32.386	Q
3	6	Freddie Polak	Great Britain	1:32.775	
4	6	Meiirzhan Tolegen	Kazakhstan	1:34.212	
1	7	Zhang Bohao	China	1:32.421	Q
2	7	Raito Kida	Japan	1:32.515	Q
3	7	Aaron Pietrobono	Italy	1:34.495	
4	7	Yerassyl Shynggyskhan	Kazakhstan	1:35.324	
1	8	Joo Jae-hee	South Korea	1:36.033	Q
2	8	Franck Tekam	France	1:37.562	Q
3	8	Ryo Ong	Singapore	1:37.674	
4	8	Volodymyr Melnyk	Ukraine	1:37.915	
1	9	Yuta Fuchigami	Japan	1:29.377	Q
2	9	Willem Murray	Great Britain	1:29.544	Q
3	9	Alexis Dubuc-Bilodeau	Canada	1:29.623	
4	9	Chonlachart Taprom	Thailand	1:32.316	

=== Quarterfinals ===
Q – qualified for the semifinals

Rank	Heat	Name	Country	Time	Notes
1	1	Zhang Xinzhe	China	1:27.738	Q
2	1	Sean Shuai	United States	1:27.792	Q
3	1	Willem Murray	Great Britain	1:27.931	q
4	1	Peter Groseclose	Philippines	1:28.899	
5	1	Nick Endeveld	Netherlands	1:30.151	
1	2	Joo Jae-hee	South Korea	1:29.839	Q
2	2	Dominik Major	Hungary	1:29.951	Q
3	2	Franck Tekam	France	1:30.844	
4	2	Asen Gyurov	Bulgaria	1:31.051	
5	2	Yuta Fuchigami	Japan	1:54.976	
1	3	Zhang Bohao	China	1:29.750	Q
2	3	Raito Kida	Japan	1:29.852	Q
3	3	Luka Jašić	Serbia	1:30.192	
4	3	Krzysztof Mądry	Poland	1:30.492	
5	3	Victor Chartrand	Canada	1:48.478	
1	4	Kim You-sung	South Korea	1:27.506	Q
2	4	Lucas Koo	Brazil	1:27.554	Q
3	4	Muhammed Bozdağ	Turkey	1:27.592	q
4	4	Daniele Zampedri	Italy	1:27.753	
5	4	Tymeo Libeau	France	1:29.743	

=== Semifinals ===
QA – qualified for Final A
QB – qualified for Final B

Rank	Heat	Name	Country	Time	Notes
1	1	Zhang Xinzhe	China	1:26.373	QA
2	1	Zhang Bohao	China	1:26.473	QA
3	1	Willem Murray	Great Britain	1:27.908	QB
4	1	Dominik Major	Hungary	1:33.309	ADVB
	1	Sean Shuai	United States	PEN	
1	1	Joo Jae-hee	South Korea	1:25.579	QA
2	1	Raito Kida	Japan	1:26.061	QA
3	2	Muhammed Bozdağ	Turkey	1:26.121	QA
4	2	Kim You-sung	South Korea	1:26.488	QB
5	2	Lucas Koo	Brazil	No Time	QB

=== Final B ===
Rank	Name	Country	Time	Notes
6	Dominik Major	Hungary	1:29.674	
7	Kim You-sung	South Korea	1:29.930	
8	Willem Murray	Great Britain	1:30.229	
9	Lucas Koo	Brazil	PEN	

=== Final A ===
Rank	Name	Country	Time	Notes
1st place, gold medalist(s)	Zhang Xinzhe	China	1:26.257	
2nd place, silver medalist(s)	Muhammed Bozdağ	Turkey	1:26.349	
3rd place, bronze medalist(s)	Raito Kida	Japan	1:26.478	
4	Joo Jae-hee	South Korea	2:31.327	
5	Zhang Bohao	China	PEN	
