= Short-track speed skating at the 2024 Winter Youth Olympics – Men's 1500 metres =

Men's 1500 metres at the IV Winter Youth Olympic Games
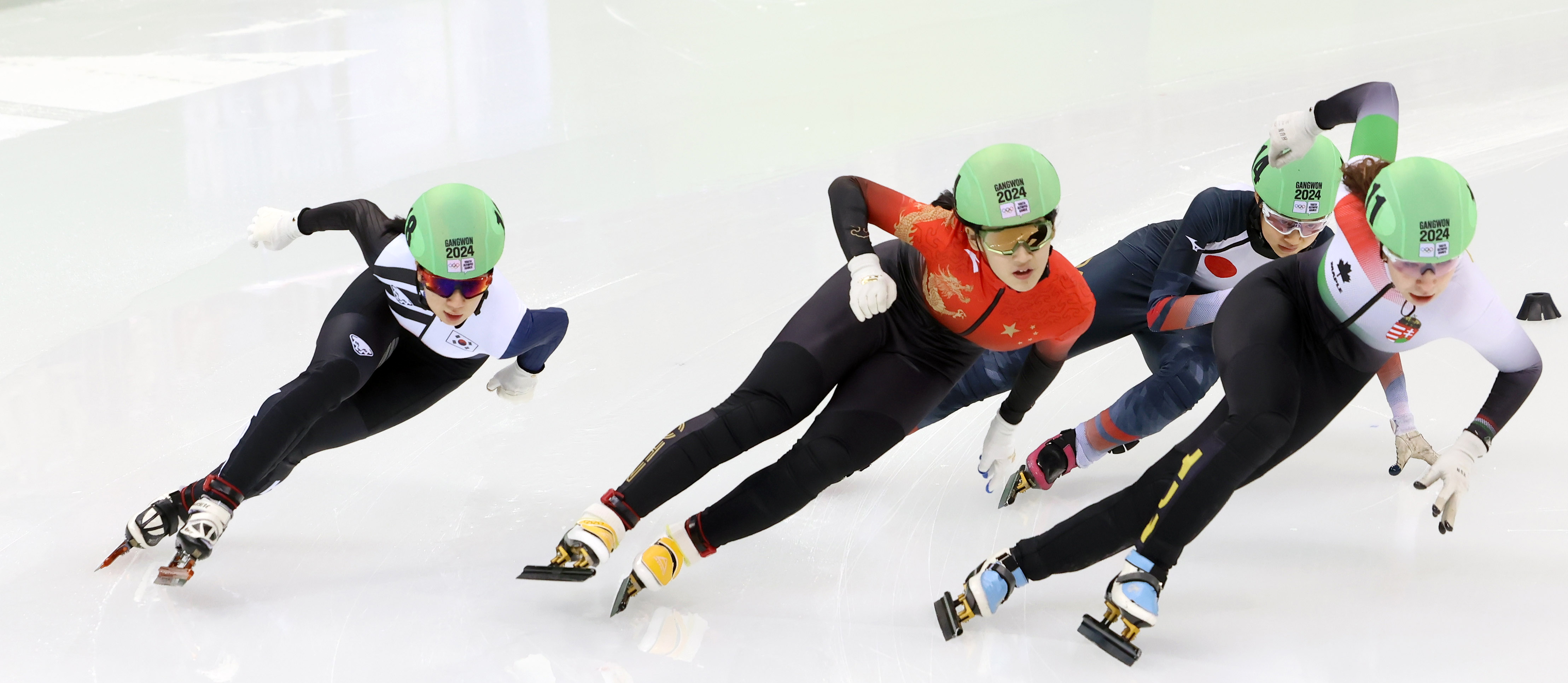
- Venue: Gangneung Ice Arena
- Dates: 20 January
- Competitors: 36 from 23 nations
- Winning time: 2:21.906

Medalists
1st place, gold medalist(s)		Joo Jae-hee	South Korea
2nd place, silver medalist(s)		Zhang Xinzhe	China
3rd place, bronze medalist(s)		Kim You-sung	South Korea

The men's 1500 metres in short track speed skating at the 2024 Winter Youth Olympics will be held on 20 January at the Gangneung Ice Arena.

== Results ==
=== Quarterfinals ===
Q – qualified for the semifinals

Rank	Heat	Name	Country	Time	Notes
1	1	Sean Shuai	United States	2:23.233	Q
2	1	Luka Jašić	Serbia	2:23.335	Q
3	1	Julius Kazanecki	United States	2:23.412	Q
4	1	Yerassyl Shynggyskhan	Kazakhstan	2:24.126	q
5	1	Chonlachart Taprom	Thailand	2:49.322	
	1	Moritz Hartmann	Germany	PEN	
1	2	Zhang Xinzhe	China	2:20.170	Q
2	2	Dominik Major	Hungary	2:20.938	Q
3	2	Daniele Zampedri	Italy	2:21.057	Q
4	2	Dávid Keszthelyi	Hungary	2:22.790	q
5	2	Asen Gyurov	Bulgaria	2:23.571	
6	2	Volodymyr Melnyk	Ukraine	2:23.798	
1	3	Muhammed Bozdağ	Turkey	2:31.583	Q
2	3	Toprak Efe Eroğlu	Turkey	2:32.997	Q
3	3	Aaron Pietrobono	Italy	2:33.358	Q
4	3	Krzysztof Mądry	Poland	3:05.255	
5	3	Nick Endeveld	Netherlands	3:08.202	
	3	Meiirzhan Tolegen	Kazakhstan	Yellow Card	
1	4	Kim You-sung	South Korea	2:29.908	Q
2	4	Victor Chartrand	Canada	2:31.035	Q
3	4	Raito Kida	Japan	2:31.283	Q
4	4	Jonas de Jong	Netherlands	2:31.604	
5	4	Tymeo Libeau	France	2:31.613	
	4	Freddie Polak	Great Britain	PEN	
1	5	Zhang Bohao	China	2:22.677	Q
2	5	Lucas Koo	Brazil	2:22.842	Q
3	5	Ryo Ong	Singapore	2:25.282	Q
4	5	Franck Tekam	France	2:25.920	
5	5	Aditya Nghiem	Australia	2:41.252	
6	5	Alexis Dubuc-Bilodeau	Canada	3:04.860	
1	6	Joo Jae-hee	South Korea	2:16.239	Q
2	6	Yuta Fuchigami	Japan	2:16.364	Q
3	6	Willem Murray	Great Britain	2:18.050	Q
4	6	Lowie Dekens	Belgium	2:18.473	q
5	6	Peter Groseclose	Philippines	2:20.575	
6	6	Nikolas Toskov	Bulgaria	2:39.240	

=== Semifinals ===
QA – qualified for Final A
QB – qualified for Final B

Rank	Heat	Name	Country	Time	Notes
1	1	Joo Jae-hee	South Korea	2:32.616	QA
2	1	Muhammed Bozdağ	Turkey	2:33.268	QA
3	1	Willem Murray	Great Britain	2:33.896	QB
4	1	Toprak Efe Eroğlu	Turkey	2:34.148	QB
5	1	Lowie Dekens	Belgium	2:34.308	
6	1	Aaron Pietrobono	Italy	2:36.894	
7	1	Yuta Fuchigami	Japan	2:57.832	
1	2	Kim You-sung	South Korea	2:21.960	QA
2	2	Zhang Xinzhe	China	2:21.977	QA
3	2	Raito Kida	Japan	2:22.103	QA
4	2	Dominik Major	Hungary	2:22.613	QB
5	2	Daniele Zampedri	Italy	2:24.305	QB
6	2	Victor Chartrand	Canada	2:24.838	
7	2	Dávid Keszthelyi	Hungary	2:28.840	
1	3	Zhang Bohao	China	2:26.762	QA
2	3	Sean Shuai	United States	2:27.079	QA
3	3	Ryo Ong	Singapore	2:27.134	QB
4	3	Julius Kazanecki	United States	2:27.378	QB
5	3	Yerassyl Shynggyskhan	Kazakhstan	2:33.281	
6	3	Luka Jašić	Serbia	2:33.336	ADVB
7	3	Lucas Koo	Brazil	2:34.007	

=== Final B ===
Rank	Name	Country	Time	Notes
8	Daniele Zampedri	Italy	2:41.355	
9	Toprak Efe Eroğlu	Turkey	2:41.499	
10	Willem Murray	Great Britain	2:41.906	
11	Julius Kazanecki	United States	2:42.031	
12	Dominik Major	Hungary	2:44.837	
13	Ryo Ong	Singapore	2:46.823	
14	Luka Jašić	Serbia	DNS	

=== Final A ===
Rank	Name	Country	Time	Notes
1st place, gold medalist(s)	Joo Jae-hee	South Korea	2:21.906	
2nd place, silver medalist(s)	Zhang Xinzhe	China	2:22.095	
3rd place, bronze medalist(s)	Kim You-sung	South Korea	2:22.148	
4	Sean Shuai	United States	2:22.177	
5	Zhang Bohao	China	2:22.191	
6	Raito Kida	Japan	2:23.299	
7	Muhammed Bozdağ	Turkey	2:24.442	
