= Short-track speed skating at the 2024 Winter Youth Olympics =

Short track speed skating at the IV Winter Youth Olympic Games
- Venue: Gangneung Ice Arena
- Dates: 20–23 January
- Competitors: 71 from 29 nations

Short track speed skating at the 2024 Winter Youth Olympics took place from 20 to 23 January 2024 at the Gangneung Ice Arena, Gangneung, South Korea.

== Schedule ==
All times are in KST (UTC+9)

Date	Time	Event
20 January	11:00	Men/Women 1500 metres
21 January	11:00	Men/Women 1000 metres
22 January	15:00	Men/Women 500 metres
24 January	10:00	Mixed relay

== Events ==
=== Men's events ===
Event	Gold		Silver		Bronze	
500 metres	Sean Shuai; United States	41.498	Zhang Xinzhe; China	41.755	Dominik Gergely Major; Hungary	41.969
1000 metres	Zhang Xinzhe; China	1:26.257	Muhammed Bozdağ; Turkey	1:26.349	Raito Kida; Japan	1:26.478
1500 metres	Joo Jae-hee; South Korea	2:21.906	Zhang Xinzhe; China	2:22.095	Kim You-sung; South Korea	2:22.148

=== Women's events ===
Event	Gold		Silver		Bronze	
500 metres	Anna Falkowska; Poland	44.314	Kang Min-ji; South Korea	44.484	Chung Jae-hee; South Korea	45.018
1000 metres	Li Jinzi; China	1:40.803	Yang Jingru; China	1:40.996	Polina Omelchuk; Kazakhstan	1:41.600
1500 metres	Yang Jingru; China	2:33.148	Li Jinzi; China	2:41.543	Nonomi Inoue; Japan	2:42.293

=== Mixed events ===
Event	Gold		Silver		Bronze	
Mixed team relay	China; Li Jinzi; Yang Jingru; Zhang Bohao; Zhang Xinzhe	2:46.516	United States; Kyung Jang; Eliza Rhodehamel; Julius Kazanecki; Sean Shuai	2:47.124	Japan; Nonomi Inoue; Aoi Yoshizawa; Yuta Fuchigami; Raito Kida	2:47.412

== Medal table ==
* Host nation (South Korea)

Rank	Nation	Gold	Silver	Bronze	Total
1	China	4	4	0	8
2	South Korea*	1	1	2	4
3	United States	1	1	0	2
4	Poland	1	0	0	1
5	Turkey	0	1	0	1
6	Japan	0	0	3	3
7	Hungary	0	0	1	1
7	Kazakhstan	0	0	1	1
Totals (8 entries)		7	7	7	21

== Qualification ==
=== Summary ===
Quota could be achieved via the 2023 World Junior Short Track Speed Skating Championships. The following NOCs received quotas:

NOC	Men	Women	Mixed Relay	Total
Australia	1			1
~~Austria~~	~~1~~ 0			0
Belgium	~~0~~ 1			1
Brazil	1			1
Bulgaria	2	1		3
Canada	2	2	Yes	4
China	2	2	Yes	4
Czech Republic		1		1
France	2	~~2~~ 1		3
Germany	1	~~2~~ 1		2
Great Britain	2			2
Hong Kong		1		1
Hungary	2	2	Yes	4
Italy	2	2		4
Japan	2	2	Yes	4
Kazakhstan	2	2	Yes	4
Latvia		2		2
Lithuania		~~0~~ 1		1
Netherlands	2	2	Yes	4
~~Norway~~		~~1~~ 0		0
Philippines	1			1
Poland	1	2		3
Serbia	1			1
Singapore	1	~~0~~ 1		2
Slovakia		2		2
Slovenia	~~1~~ 0	1		1
South Korea	2	2	Yes	4
Thailand	~~0~~ 1	1		2
Turkey	2			2
Ukraine	1	2		3
United States	2	2	Yes	4
Total: 29 NOCs	36	35	8	71
