= Figure skating at the 2024 Winter Youth Olympics – Pair skating =

Women's singles at the IV Winter Youth Olympic Games
- Venue: Gangneung Ice Arena
- Dates: 27, 29 January
- Competitors: 8 from 4 nations

Medalists
1st place, gold medalist(s)		Annika Behnke; Kole Sauve	Canada
2nd place, silver medalist(s)		Cayla Smith; Jared McPike	United States
3rd place, bronze medalist(s)		Carolina Shan Campillo; Pau Vilella	Spain

The pair skating competition of the 2024 Winter Youth Olympics was held at the Gangneung Ice Arena on 27 January (short program) and 29 January 2024 (free skating).

== Results ==
=== Short program ===
The short program was held on 27 January at 13:30.

Pl.	Name	Nation	TSS	TES	PCS	CO	PR	SK	Ded	StN
1	Annika Behnke / Kole Sauve	Canada	39.09	21.72	18.37	4.71	4.43	4.68	–1.00	2
2	Cayla Smith / Jared McPike	United States	36.80	19.21	17.59	4.54	4.39	4.29	0.00	1
3	Carolina Shan Campillo / Pau Vilella	Spain	31.52	16.37	16.15	4.07	3.93	4.14	–1.00	4
4	Peyton Bellamy-Martins / Kryshtof Pradeaux	Australia	29.03	16.40	14.63	3.79	3.50	3.71	–2.00	3

=== Free skating ===
The free skating was held on 29 January at 11:30.

Pl.	Name	Nation	TSS	TES	PCS	CO	PR	SK	Ded	StN
1	Annika Behnke / Kole Sauve	Canada	74.54	38.45	37.09	4.64	4.54	4.71	-1.00	3
2	Carolina Shan Campillo / Pau Vilella	Spain	62.51	28.77	33.74	4.36	4.54	4.71	0.00	2
3	Cayla Smith / Jared McPike	United States	61.20	25.08	36.12	4.57	4.57	4.39	0.00	4
4	Peyton Bellamy-Martins / Kryshtof Pradeaux	Australia	59.33	27.28	32.05	4.07	3.89	4.04	0.00	1

=== Overall ===
Rank	Name	Nation	Total points	SP		FS	
1	Annika Behnke / Kole Sauve	Canada	113.63	1	39.09	1	74.54
2	Cayla Smith / Jared McPike	United States	98.00	2	36.80	3	61.20
3	Carolina Shan Campillo / Pau Vilella	Spain	94.03	3	31.52	2	62.51
4	Peyton Bellamy-Martins / Kryshtof Pradeaux	Australia	88.36	4	29.03	4	59.33
