= Short-track speed skating at the 2024 Winter Youth Olympics – Men's 500 metres =

Men's 500 metres at the IV Winter Youth Olympic Games
- Venue: Gangneung Ice Arena
- Dates: 22 January
- Competitors: 36 from 23 nations
- Winning time: 41.498

Medalists
1st place, gold medalist(s)		Sean Shuai	United States
2nd place, silver medalist(s)		Zhang Xinzhe	China
3rd place, bronze medalist(s)		Dominik Major	Hungary

The men's 500 metres in short track speed skating at the 2024 Winter Youth Olympics was held on 22 January at the Gangneung Ice Arena.

== Results ==
=== Heats ===
Q – qualified for the quarterfinals

Rank	Heat	Name	Country	Time	Notes
1	1	Zhang Xinzhe	China	42.189	Q
2	1	Franck Tekam	France	42.503	Q
3	1	Aaron Pietrobono	Italy	42.629	q
4	1	Moritz Hartmann	Germany	43.758	
1	2	Kim You-sung	South Korea	42.685	Q
2	2	Alexis Dubuc-Bilodeau	Canada	42.702	Q
3	2	Luka Jašić	Serbia	42.762	
4	2	Ryo Ong	Singapore	44.938	
1	3	Yuta Fuchigami	Japan	42.738	Q
2	3	Willem Murray	Great Britain	42.917	Q
3	3	Yerassyl Shynggyskhan	Kazakhstan	44.812	
	3	Krzysztof Mądry	Poland	PEN	
1	4	Raito Kida	Japan	42.479	Q
2	4	Volodymyr Melnyk	Ukraine	44.455	Q
3	4	Julius Kazanecki	United States	51.775	ADV
	4	Dávid Keszthelyi	Hungary	PEN	
1	5	Peter Groseclose	Philippines	42.019	Q
2	5	Muhammed Bozdağ	Turkey	42.220	Q
3	5	Nikolas Toskov	Bulgaria	47.982	
4	5	Jonas de Jong	Netherlands	1:14.759	
1	6	Dominik Major	Hungary	42.409	Q
2	6	Meiirzhan Tolegen	Kazakhstan	43.517	Q
3	6	Tymeo Libeau	France	43.576	
4	6	Chonlachart Taprom	Thailand	1:08.040	
1	7	Sean Shuai	United States	41.755	Q
2	7	Daniele Zampedri	Italy	42.790	Q
3	7	Toprak Efe Eroğlu	Turkey	43.667	
4	7	Lowie Dekens	Belgium	43.758	
1	8	Victor Chartrand	Canada	42.248	Q
2	8	Joo Jae-hee	South Korea	42.499	Q
3	8	Nick Endeveld	Netherlands	44.542	
4	8	Asen Gyurov	Bulgaria	58.702	
1	9	Zhang Bohao	China	42.688	Q
2	9	Lucas Koo	Brazil	42.849	Q
3	9	Freddie Polak	Great Britain	42.909	
4	9	Aditya Nghiem	Australia	47.879	

=== Quarterfinals ===
Q – qualified for the semifinals

Rank	Heat	Name	Country	Time	Notes
1	1	Zhang Xinzhe	China	41.901	Q
2	1	Daniele Zampedri	Italy	42.350	Q
3	1	Raito Kida	Japan	42.490	
4	1	Aaron Pietrobono	Italy	42.667	
5	1	Joo Jae-hee	South Korea	1:02.227	
1	2	Dominik Major	Hungary	42.077	Q
2	2	Alexis Dubuc-Bilodeau	Canada	42.652	Q
3	2	Franck Tekam	France	42.869	
4	2	Julius Kazanecki	United States	43.137	
5	2	Victor Chartrand	Canada	1:13.126	
1	3	Peter Groseclose	Philippines	41.329	Q
2	3	Lucas Koo	Brazil	41.393	Q
3	3	Muhammed Bozdağ	Turkey	41.902	q
4	3	Kim You-sung	South Korea	42.035	
5	3	Volodymyr Melnyk	Ukraine	44.521	
1	4	Sean Shuai	United States	40.970	Q
2	4	Zhang Bohao	China	41.141	Q
3	4	Yuta Fuchigami	Japan	42.078	q
4	4	Willem Murray	Great Britain	42.565	
5	4	Meiirzhan Tolegen	Kazakhstan	42.680	

=== Semifinals ===
QA – qualified for Final A
QB – qualified for Final B

Rank	Heat	Name	Country	Time	Notes
1	1	Sean Shuai	United States	41.344	QA
2	1	Zhang Bohao	China	41.464	QA
3	1	Dominik Major	Hungary	42.213	QA
4	1	Alexis Dubuc-Bilodeau	Canada	43.005	QB
5	1	Yuta Fuchigami	Japan	57.216	QB
1	1	Peter Groseclose	Philippines	41.697	QA
2	1	Zhang Xinzhe	China	41.775	QA
3	2	Lucas Koo	Brazil	42.257	QB
4	2	Muhammed Bozdağ	Turkey	42.329	QB
5	2	Daniele Zampedri	Italy	42.513	QB

=== Final B ===
Rank	Name	Country	Time	Notes
6	Daniele Zampedri	Italy	41.831	
7	Alexis Dubuc-Bilodeau	Canada	42.802	
8	Muhammed Bozdağ	Turkey	42.915	
9	Yuta Fuchigami	Japan	42.930	
10	Lucas Koo	Brazil	1:10.346	

=== Final A ===
Rank	Name	Country	Time	Notes
1st place, gold medalist(s)	Sean Shuai	United States	41.498	
2nd place, silver medalist(s)	Zhang Xinzhe	China	41.755	
3rd place, bronze medalist(s)	Dominik Major	Hungary	41.969	
4	Zhang Bohao	China	45.685	
	Peter Groseclose	Philippines	PEN	
