= Freestyle skiing at the 2024 Winter Youth Olympics – Men's dual moguls =

Men's dual moguls at the IV Winter Youth Olympic Games
- Venue: High1 Resort
- Dates: 27 January
- Competitors: 20 from 15 nations

Medalists
1st place, gold medalist(s)		Lee Yoon-seung	South Korea
2nd place, silver medalist(s)		Porter Huff	United States
3rd place, bronze medalist(s)		Takuto Nakamura	Japan

The men's dual moguls event in freestyle skiing at the 2024 Winter Youth Olympics took place on 27 January at the High1 Resort.

== Round robin ==
The round robin stage was started at 13:30.

=== Panel 1 ===
Rank	Bib	Name	Country	Opponents					Points	Notes
Rank	Bib	Name	Country	1 KOR	9 CAN	8 KAZ	16 SUI	17 UKR	Points	Notes
1	1	Lee Yoon-seung	South Korea	—	W 3–2	W 3–2	W 3–2	W 3–2	12	Q
2	9	Jeremy Sauvageau	Canada	L 2–3	—	W 3–2	W 3–2	W 3–2	11	
3	8	Denis Rastruba	Kazakhstan	L 2–3	L 2–3	—	W 3–1	W 3–2	10	
4	16	Tazio Buzzi	Switzerland	L 2–3	L 2–3	DNF 1–3	—	W 3–2	8	
4	17	Dmytro Perets	Ukraine	L 2–3	L 2–3	L 2–3	L 2–3	—	8	

=== Panel 2 ===
Rank	Bib	Name	Country	Opponents					Points	Notes
Rank	Bib	Name	Country	2 JPN	15 CAN	7 AUS	10 KOR	18 IRL	Points	Notes
1	2	Takuto Nakamura	Japan	—	W 3–2	L 2–3	W 3–2	W 3–2	11	Q
2	15	Bradley Koehler	Canada	W 3–2	—	L 2–3	W 3–2	W 3–2	11	
3	7	Edward Hill	Australia	L 2–3	W 3–2	—	W 3–2	W 3–1	11	
4	10	Kim Jin-suck	South Korea	L 2–3	L 2–3	L 2–3	—	W 3–2	9	
5	18	Thomas Dooley	Ireland	L 2–3	L 2–3	DNF 1–3	L 2–3	—	7	

=== Panel 3 ===
Rank	Bib	Name	Country	Opponents					Points	Notes
Rank	Bib	Name	Country	3 USA	14 CHN	11 FIN	6 SWE	19 SUI	Points	Notes
1	3	Porter Huff	United States	—	W 3–2	W 3–2	W 3–2	W 3–1	12	Q
2	14	Long Hao	China	L 2–3	—	W 3–2	W 3–2	W 3–1	11	
3	11	Eero Lampi	Finland	L 2–3	L 2–3	—	W 3–2	W 3–2	10	
4	6	Noel Gravenfors	Sweden	L 2–3	L 2–3	L 2–3	—	W 3–1	9	
5	19	Joel Gianella	Switzerland	DNF 1–3	DNF 1–3	L 2–3	DNF 1–3	—	5	

=== Panel 4 ===
Rank	Bib	Name	Country	Opponents					Points	Notes
Rank	Bib	Name	Country	5 USA	4 SWE	20 ESP	13 CZE	12 FRA	Points	Notes
1	5	Jiah Cohen	United States	—	W 3–2	L 2–3	W 3–2	W 3–2	11	Q
2	4	Elis Moberg	Sweden	L 2–3	—	W 3–1	W 3–2	W 3–2	11	
3	20	Anton Verdaguer Forn	Spain	W 3–2	DNF 1–3	—	W 3–2	W 3–2	10	
4	13	Vít Zvalený	Czech Republic	L 2–3	L 2–3	L 2–3	—	W 3–1	9	
5	12	Paul Andrea Gay	France	L 2–3	L 2–3	L 2–3	DNF 1–3	—	7	

== Finals ==
Semifinals
Lee Yoon-seung (KOR)	20
Jiah Cohen (USA)	15
Takuto Nakamura (JPN)	3
Porter Huff (USA)	32

Final
Lee Yoon-seung (KOR)	18
Porter Huff (USA)	17
Third place
Jiah Cohen (USA)	16
Takuto Nakamura (JPN)	19
