= Philippines at the 2024 Winter Youth Olympics =

- Flag of Philippines
- IOC code: PHI
- NOC: Philippine Olympic Committee

in Gangwon, South Korea 19 January 2024 – 1 February 2024
- Competitors: 3 in 3 sports
- Flag bearer: Laetaz Rabe (Note: Peter Groseclose was listed as Rabe's co-flagbearer but it was only Rabe who served as flagbearer for the opening ceremony.)
- Medals: Gold 0 Silver 0 Bronze 0 Total 0

Winter Youth Olympics appearances (overview)
- 2012; 2016; 2020; 2024

Philippines competed at the 2024 Winter Youth Olympics in Gangwon, South Korea, from January 19 to February 1, 2024. This is Philippines's third appearance at the Winter Youth Olympic Games.

Having taken part in the 2020 edition, this is the first back-to-back appearance for the Philippines in the Winter Youth Olympics. The Filipino team consisted of three athletes (two men and one woman) competing in three sports.

Laetaz Rabe, a freestyle skier was the flagbearer for the Philippine delegation at the opening ceremony.

== Competitors ==
The following is the list of number of competitors participating at the Games per sport/discipline.

Sport	Men	Women	Total
Cross-country skiing	1	0	1
Freestyle skiing	0	1	1
Short track speed skating	1	0	1
Total	2	1	3

== Cross-country skiing ==
The Philippines received 1 male quota. Calgary, Canada resident 16-year-old Avery Balbanida fills the lone quota slot. Balbinada has competed in the sprint freestyle event and the 7.5-kilometer classical. He is joined by her Australian coach Allison McArdle.

Balbanida failed to advanced from the qualification round, finishing 69th. He needed to finish among the top 30 skiers to advance. He marked the end of the Philippine delegation's campaign by finishing in 65th place in the 7.5-kilometer classic.

Classic & Skates

Athlete	Event	Qualification		Quarterfinal		Semifinal		Final	
Athlete	Event	Time	Rank	Time	Rank	Time	Rank	Time	Rank
Avery Balbanida	7.5 km classical	—N/a						25:15.9	65
Avery Balbanida	Sprint freestyle	3:44.34	69	Did not advance					

== Freestyle skiing ==
The Philippines received 1 female quota in slopestyle/big air. 14-year-old Laetaz Rabe fills the slot. Based in Switzerland, Rabe is born to parents hailing from Cotabato City and Malolos.

Rabe sustained an injury on her left knee during a warm-up training just before the freeski slopestyle qualification causing her to miss the event. The injury rendered her unable to compete in the big air event as well.

Slopestyle & Big Air

Athlete	Event	Qualification				Final				
Athlete	Event	Run 1	Run 2	Best	Rank	Run 1	Run 2	Run 3	Best	Rank
Laetaz Rabe	Girls' big air	Withdrew			—N/a	Did not advance				
Laetaz Rabe	Girls' slopestyle	DNS			—N/a	Did not advance				

== Short track speed skating ==
The Philippines achieved 1 male quota at the 2023 World Junior Short Track Speed Skating Championships. The slot was filled in by Peter Groseclose.

Groseclose, who is coached by Olympic medalist John-Henry Krueger, is the first to compete among the 3-athlete Philippine delegation. He competed at the 1,500-meter, 500-meter and 1,000-meter races. Groseclose failed to advanced from the quarterfinal of the 1,500-meter race which he said is his weakest event among the three; describing the event as an "endurance race" and himself as more of a sprinter. He also finished as a quarterfinalist in the 1,000-meter race.

It was in the 500-meter race that Groseclose had his best performance; reaching the final stage. In the fifth and final lap, Groseclose and China's Zhang Bohao are in close contention for a bronze medal but the two stumbled on each other in the 40-second mark. He was penalized and did not record any time. Close to clinching the first-ever Winter Youth Olympics medal for the Philippines, Groseclose's feat was hailed by the delegation as the best ever finish of the Philippines in an Olympic winter sport event.

Men

Athlete	Event	Heats		Quarterfinal		Semifinal		Final	
Athlete	Event	Time	Rank	Time	Rank	Time	Rank	Time	Rank
Peter Groseclose	500 m	42.019	1 Q	41.329	1 Q	41.697	1 Q	PEN	
Peter Groseclose	1000 m	1:30.243	1 Q	1:28.899	4	Did not advance			
Peter Groseclose	1500 m	—N/a		2:20.575	5	Did not advance			
