= Bobsleigh at the 2024 Winter Youth Olympics – Men's monobob =

Men's monobob at the IV Winter Youth Olympic Games
- Venue: Alpensia Sliding Centre
- Dates: 23 January 2024
- Competitors: 18 from 13 nations
- Winning time: 1:48.63

Medalists
1st place, gold medalist(s)		So Jae-hwan	South Korea
2nd place, silver medalist(s)		Jonathan Lourimi	Tunisia
3rd place, bronze medalist(s)		Chi Xiangyu	China

The men's monobob competition at the 2024 Winter Youth Olympics took place on 23 January at the Alpensia Sliding Centre.

Jonathan Lourimi earned the silver medal in the men's monobob, becoming the first Tunisian athlete to win a Winter Youth Olympics medal. This was only the second Winter Youth Olympics medal by a North African nation, after Morocco's historic gold in 2012.

== Results ==
The first run was held at 14:30 and the second run at 15:26.

Rank	Start No.	Athlete	Country	Run 1	Rank 1	Run 2	Rank 2	Total	Behind
1st place, gold medalist(s)	1	So Jae-hwan	South Korea	53.80	1	54.83	2	1:48.63	
2nd place, silver medalist(s)	9	Jonathan Lourimi	Tunisia	54.79	2	55.17	3	1:49.96	+1.33
3rd place, bronze medalist(s)	4	Chi Xiangyu	China	55.45	8	54.73	1	1:50.18	+1.55
4	2	Julian Klein	Germany	55.18	6	55.38	4	1:50.56	+1.93
5	7	Michał Mikołajski	Poland	55.12	5	55.48	5	1:50.60	+1.97
6	3	Florin-Dicu Mihai	Romania	55.00	3	55.69	7	1:50.69	+2.06
7	8	Kitthamat Palakai	Thailand	55.46	9	55.61	6	1:51.07	+2.44
8	5	Tillmann Hecking	Germany	55.11	4	56.05	10	1:51.16	+2.53
9	10	John Lansing	United States	55.21	7	56.01	9	1:51.22	+2.59
10	16	Luis Felipe Seixas de Souza	Brazil	55.58	11	56.14	11	1:51.72	+3.09
11	6	Ben Mielke	Germany	56.05	14	55.95	8	1:52.00	+3.37
12	11	Henning Beierl	Austria	55.54	10	56.52	15	1:52.06	+3.43
12	14	Raul Ștefan Predescu	Romania	55.72	12	56.34	14	1:52.06	+3.43
14	12	Ivan Boteff-Wallace	France	56.03	13	56.20	12	1:52.23	+3.60
15	18	Lennon Smith	Great Britain	56.28	15	56.23	13	1:52.51	+3.88
16	15	Isaak Ulmer	Canada	56.53	17	56.67	16	1:53.20	+4.57
17	17	André Luiz dos Santos Alves da Silva	Brazil	56.50	16	56.86	18	1:53.36	+4.73
18	13	Liam McKenna	United States	56.77	18	56.77	17	1:53.54	+4.91
