= Canada at the 2024 Winter Youth Olympics =

- Flag of Canada
- IOC code: CAN
- NOC: Canadian Olympic Committee
- Website: www.olympic.ca (in English and French)

in Gangwon, South Korea 19 January 2024 – 1 February 2024
- Competitors: 79 in 12 sports
- Flag bearers (opening): Charlie Beatty & Chloe Fediuk
- Flag bearers (closing): Kole Sauve & Annika Behnke
- Medals Ranked 11th: Gold 3 Silver 2 Bronze 1 Total 6

Winter Youth Olympics appearances
- 2012; 2016; 2020; 2024

Canada competed at the 2024 Winter Youth Olympics in Gangwon, South Korea, from January 19 to February 1, 2024. This was Canada's fourth appearance at the Winter Youth Olympic Games, having competed at every Games since the inaugural edition in 2012.

The Canadian team consisted of 79 athletes (48 men and 31 women) competing in 12 sports. The country did not qualify athletes in skeleton or Nordic combined, and chose not to send athletes in speed skating. Freestyle skier Charlie Beatty and curler Chloe Fediuk were the country's flagbearers during the opening ceremony. Meanwhile, figure skaters Kole Sauve and Annika Behnke were the country's flagbearers during the closing ceremony.

In March 2023, curler Lisa Weagle was named as the country's chef de mission.

== Competitors ==
The following is the list of number of competitors (per gender) participating at the games per sport/discipline.

Sport	Men	Women	Total
Alpine skiing	1	2	3
Biathlon	3	3	6
Bobsleigh	1	1	2
Cross-country skiing	2	2	4
Curling	3	3	6
Figure skating	4	4	8
Freestyle skiing	8	6	14
Ice hockey	18	0	18
Luge	1	2	3
Short track speed skating	2	2	4
Ski jumping	1	0	1
Snowboarding	4	6	10
Total	48	31	79

== Medallists ==
The following Canadian competitors won medals at the games. In the discipline sections below, the medalists' names are bolded.

Medal	Name	Sport	Event	Date
Gold	Charlie Beatty	Freestyle skiing	Men's big air	January 28
Gold	Eli Bouchard	Snowboarding	Men's big air	January 28
Gold	Kole Sauve; Annika Behnke	Figure skating	Mixed pairs	January 29
Silver	Anthony Shelly	Snowboarding	Men's snowboard cross	January 20
Silver	Eli Bouchard	Snowboarding	Men's slopestyle	January 25
Bronze	David Li; Kaiya Ruiter; Kole Sauve; Annika Behnke; Audra Gans; Michael Boutsan	Figure skating	Team event	February 1

== Alpine skiing ==
Canada qualified three alpine skiers (one man and two women). The team was named on December 22, 2023. On January 11, 2024, it was announced Elsa Feliciello replaced Sierra Coe due to an injury sustained by the latter.

Athlete	Event	Run 1		Run 2		Total	
Athlete	Event	Time	Rank	Time	Rank	Time	Rank
Thomas Carnahan	Men's super-G	—N/a				55.14	9
Thomas Carnahan	Men's giant slalom	DNF					
Thomas Carnahan	Men's slalom	48.44	16	DNF			
Thomas Carnahan	Men's combined	DNF					
Aida Draghia	Women's giant slalom	49.71	9	54.50	16	1:44.21	11
Aida Draghia	Women's slalom	51.24	13	49.32	12	1:40.56	10
Elsa Feliciello	Women's super-G	—N/a				DNS	
Elsa Feliciello	Women's giant slalom	51.15	19	54.12	11	1:45.27	16
Elsa Feliciello	Women's slalom	51.18	12	50.45	20	1:41.63	14

Mixed

Athlete	Event	Round of 16	Quarterfinal	Semifinal	Final / BM	
Athlete	Event	Opposition Result	Opposition Result	Opposition Result	Opposition Result	Rank
Thomas Carnahan; Aida Draghia	Parallel mixed team	France; **L** 1–3	Did not advance			

== Biathlon ==
Canada qualified six biathletes (three per gender). The team was named on December 21, 2023.

Individual

Athlete	Event	Time	Misses	Rank
Dawson Ferguson	Men's sprint	24:51	4 (3+1)	55
Dawson Ferguson	Men's individual	46:36.6	7 (3+1+1+2)	70
Luke Hulshof	Men's sprint	24:26.1	5 (2+3)	43
Luke Hulshof	Men's individual	42:18.0	2 (0+0+0+2)	5
Justin Konoff	Men's sprint	23:22.4	3 (1+2)	20
Justin Konoff	Men's individual	43:11.3	7 (0+2+3+2)	44
Julia Bartlett	Women's sprint	DNS		
Julia Bartlett	Women's individual	45:21.8	7 (2+2+2+1)	59
Flora Csonka	Women's sprint	23:56.5	5 (2+3)	40
Flora Csonka	Women's individual	43:16.4	4 (0+2+1+1)	33
Cheyenne Tirschmann	Women's sprint	22:19.8	2 (2+0)	24
Cheyenne Tirschmann	Women's individual	42:48.4	5 (1+2+1+1)	27

Mixed

Athletes	Event	Time	Misses	Rank
Luke Hulshof; Cheyenne Tirschmann	Single mixed relay	51:51.8	31 (13+18)	20
Luke Hulshof; Justin Konoff; Flora Csonka; Cheyenne Tirschmann	Mixed relay	1:21:55.5	23 (4+19)	6

== Bobsleigh ==
Canada qualified two bobsledders (one per gender). The team was named on December 20, 2023.

Athlete	Event	Run 1		Run 2		Total	
Athlete	Event	Time	Rank	Time	Rank	Time	Rank
Isaak Ulmer	Men's monobob	56.53	17	56.67	16	1:53.20	16
Talia Melun	Women's monobob	57.99	10	58.07	9	1:56.0	9

== Cross-country skiing ==
Canada qualified four cross-country skiers (two per gender). The team was named on December 12, 2023.

Men

Athlete	Event	Qualification		Quarterfinal		Semifinal		Final	
Athlete	Event	Time	Rank	Time	Rank	Time	Rank	Time	Rank
Cedric Martel	7.5 km classical	—N/a						20:48.9	19
Cedric Martel	Sprint freestyle	3:09.19	16 **Q**	3:10.38	1 **Q**	3:11.34	6	Did not advance	
Eamon Wilson	7.5 km classical	—N/a						20:51.0	21
Eamon Wilson	Sprint freestyle	3:06.56	9 **Q**	DQ		Did not advance			

Women

Athlete	Event	Qualification		Quarterfinal		Semifinal		Final	
Athlete	Event	Time	Rank	Time	Rank	Time	Rank	Time	Rank
Aramintha Bradford	7.5 km classical	—N/a						23:21.6	16
Aramintha Bradford	Sprint freestyle	3:36.97	8 **Q**	3:36.77	3 **LL**	3:44.90	5	Did not advance	
Leanne Gartner	7.5 km classical	—N/a						23:46.1	22
Leanne Gartner	Sprint freestyle	3:47.18	26 **Q**	4:05.60	6	Did not advance			

Mixed

Athlete	Event	Time	Rank
Leanne Gartner; Eamon Wilson; Aramintha Bradford; Cedric Martel	Mixed relay	54:25.9	6

== Curling ==
Canada qualified a mixed team and mixed doubles pair for a total of six athletes.

Summary

Team	Event	Group Stage								Quarterfinal	Semifinal	Final / BM	
Team	Event	Opposition Score	Opposition Score	Opposition Score	Opposition Score	Opposition Score	Opposition Score	Opposition Score	Rank	Opposition Score	Opposition Score	Opposition Score	Rank
Nathan Gray; Chloe Fediuk; Owain Fisher; Allie Iskiw	Mixed team	Italy; **L** 3–8	Brazil; **W** 14–0	Great Britain; **L** 3–6	Switzerland; **W** 6–5	Germany; **W** 5–2	South Korea; **L** 7–9	Denmark; **L** 2–4	6	Did not advance			11
Cailey Locke; Simon Perry	Mixed doubles	South Korea; **W** 9–5	Hungary; **W** 8–5	Nigeria; **W** 14–0	Czech Republic; **L** 4–6	Great Britain; **L** 6–7	—N/a		3	Did not advance			10

=== Mixed tournament ===
The mixed team was named on June 8, 2023.

- Nathan Gray
- Chloe Fediuk
- Owain Fisher
- Allie Iskiw

Group B	Skip	W	L	W–L	PF	PA	EW	EL	BE	SE	DSC
Great Britain	Logan Carson	6	1	–	44	30	26	21	4	7	51.75
Denmark	Jacob Schmidt	5	2	–	48	28	27	20	2	9	34.70
Switzerland	Nathan Dryburgh	4	3	2–0	52	35	25	23	5	7	39.96
Italy	Andrea Gilli	4	3	1–1	46	38	29	23	3	7	50.58
South Korea	Kim Dae-hyun	4	3	0–2	48	33	24	22	3	8	109.88
Canada	Nathan Gray	3	4	–	40	34	24	20	3	11	35.43
Brazil	Pedro Ribeiro	1	6	1–0	17	81	13	31	0	2	103.39
Germany	Lukas Jäger	1	6	0–1	30	46	19	27	2	5	68.51

Round robin

Draw 1

Saturday, January 20, 14:00

**Sheet D**	**1**	**2**	**3**	**4**	**5**	**6**	**7**	**8**	**Final**
Canada (Gray)	0	1	0	1	0	1	0	0	**3**
**Italy (Gilli) 🔨**	1	0	1	0	3	0	2	1	**8**

Draw 2

Sunday, January 21, 10:00

**Sheet C**	**1**	**2**	**3**	**4**	**5**	**6**	**7**	**8**	**Final**
**Canada (Gray)**	1	1	2	3	4	3	X	X	**14**
Brazil (Ribeiro) 🔨	0	0	0	0	0	0	X	X	**0**

Draw 3

Sunday, January 21, 18:00

**Sheet B**	**1**	**2**	**3**	**4**	**5**	**6**	**7**	**8**	**Final**
**Great Britain (Carson) 🔨**	0	0	0	3	1	0	2	X	**6**
Canada (Gray)	1	0	1	0	0	1	0	X	**3**

Draw 4

Monday, January 22, 14:00

**Sheet A**	**1**	**2**	**3**	**4**	**5**	**6**	**7**	**8**	**Final**
**Canada (Gray) 🔨**	0	2	0	1	0	2	0	1	**6**
Switzerland (Dryburgh)	2	0	1	0	2	0	0	0	**5**

Draw 5

Tuesday, January 23, 10:00

**Sheet C**	**1**	**2**	**3**	**4**	**5**	**6**	**7**	**8**	**Final**
Germany (Jäger)	0	0	0	0	2	0	0	X	**2**
**Canada (Gray) 🔨**	1	1	3	0	0	0	0	X	**5**

Draw 6

Tuesday, January 23, 18:00

**Sheet D**	**1**	**2**	**3**	**4**	**5**	**6**	**7**	**8**	**Final**
**South Korea (Kim)**	0	2	0	0	3	2	0	2	**9**
Canada (Gray) 🔨	2	0	2	0	0	0	3	0	**7**

Draw 7

Wednesday, January 24, 13:00

**Sheet B**	**1**	**2**	**3**	**4**	**5**	**6**	**7**	**8**	**Final**
Canada (Gray) 🔨	0	0	1	0	1	0	0	0	**2**
**Denmark (Schmidt)**	0	1	0	1	0	0	1	1	**4**

=== Mixed doubles ===
Canada's mixed doubles pair was confirmed on September 8, 2023.

- Cailey Locke
- Simon Perry

Group A	W	L	W–L	DSC
Great Britain	4	1	1–0	40.06
Czech Republic	4	1	0–1	42.84
Canada	3	2	–	54.69
Hungary	2	3	1–0	89.06
South Korea	2	3	0–1	38.09
Nigeria	0	5	–	168.42

Round robin

Draw 2

Saturday, January 27, 10:00

**Sheet A**	**1**	**2**	**3**	**4**	**5**	**6**	**7**	**8**	**Final**
**Canada (Locke / Perry) 🔨**	3	2	0	3	0	1	0	X	**9**
South Korea (Lee / Lee)	0	0	1	0	1	0	3	X	**5**

Draw 7

Sunday, January 28, 18:00

**Sheet B**	**1**	**2**	**3**	**4**	**5**	**6**	**7**	**8**	**Final**
Hungary (Nagy / Kárász)	0	0	1	0	1	0	3	X	**5**
**Canada (Locke / Perry) 🔨**	2	1	0	4	0	1	0	X	**8**

Draw 9

Monday, January 29, 14:00

**Sheet A**	**1**	**2**	**3**	**4**	**5**	**6**	**7**	**8**	**Final**
Nigeria (Akinsanya / Daniel)	0	0	0	0	0	0	0	X	**0**
**Canada (Locke / Perry) 🔨**	6	1	2	1	1	1	2	X	**14**

Draw 11

Tuesday, January 30, 10:00

**Sheet C**	**1**	**2**	**3**	**4**	**5**	**6**	**7**	**8**	**Final**
Canada (Locke / Perry) 🔨	1	0	2	0	0	0	1	0	**4**
**Czech Republic (Zelingrová / Bláha)**	0	1	0	2	1	1	0	1	**6**

Draw 15

Wednesday, January 31, 12:30

**Sheet D**	**1**	**2**	**3**	**4**	**5**	**6**	**7**	**8**	**Final**
Canada (Locke / Perry) 🔨	0	2	0	0	2	0	2	0	**6**
**Great Britain (Soutar / Brewster)**	1	0	1	1	0	1	0	3	**7**

== Figure skating ==
Six Canadian figure skaters achieved quota places for Canada based on the results of the 2023 World Junior Figure Skating Championships. Two more Canadian figure skaters achieved quota places in the pair skating event based on the results of the 2023–24 ISU Junior Grand Prix ranking.

Athlete	Event	SP/SD		FS/FD		Total	
Athlete	Event	Points	Rank	Points	Rank	Points	Rank
David Li	Men's singles	57.16	11	118.57	8	175.73	10
Kaiya Ruiter	Women's singles	58.78	6	96.17	12	154.95	11
**Annika Behnke**; **Kole Sauve**	Pairs	39.09	1	74.54	1	113.63	1st place, gold medalist(s)
Audra Gans; Michael Boutsan	Ice dance	52.99	4	83.83	4	136.82	5
Caroline Kravets; Jacob Stark	Ice dance	47.98	9	67.72	9	115.70	9

Team event

Athlete	Event	Free skate / Free dance				Total	
Athlete	Event	Men's	Women's	Pairs	Ice dance	Points	Rank
Athlete	Event	Points Team points	Points Team points	Points Team points	Points Team points	Points	Rank
**David Li (M)**; **Kaiya Ruiter (W)**; **Annika Behnke / Kole Sauve (P)**; **Audra Gans / Michael Boutsan (ID)**	Team event	116.61; 2	103.41; 2	82.39; 5	80.24; ~~1~~	9	3rd place, bronze medalist(s)

== Freestyle skiing ==
Canada qualified 13 freestyler skiers (eight men and five women). The teams were named on December 22, 2023. On January 11, 2024, Ella Garrod was added to the team after receiving an unused quota spot.

Dual moguls
Individual

Athlete	Event	Group Stage						Semifinals	Final / BM	
Athlete	Event	Opposition Result	Opposition Result	Opposition Result	Opposition Result	Points	Rank	Opposition Result	Opposition Result	Rank
Bradley Koehler	Men's dual moguls	Dooley (IRL); **W** 3–2	Hill (AUS); **L** 2–3	Nakamura (JPN); **W** 3–2	Kim (KOR); **W** 3–2	11	2	Did not advance		
Jérémy Sauvageau	Men's dual moguls	Lee (KOR); **L** 2–3	Perets (UKR); **W** 3–2	Rastruba (KAZ); **W** 3–2	Buzzi (SUI); **W** 3–2	11	2	Did not advance		
Citrine Boychuk	Women's dual moguls	McLarnon (USA); **L** 2–3	Tlapáková (CZE); **W** 3–2	Michl (GER); **W** 3–2	Eckle (GER); **W** 3–2	11	2	Did not advance		
Flavie Lamontagne	Women's dual moguls	Lemley (USA); **L** 2–3	Nilsson (SWE); **W** 3–2	Yun (KOR); **W** 3–2	Hedberg (SWE); **L** 2–3	10	3	Did not advance		

Team

Athlete	Event	Round of 16	Quarterfinals	Semifinals	Final / BM	
Athlete	Event	Opposition Result	Opposition Result	Opposition Result	Opposition Result	Rank
Citrine Boychuk; Jérémy Sauvageau	Mixed team	Hedberg / Moberg (SWE); **W** 39–31	Lemley / Huff (USA); **L** 20–50	Did not advance		
Flavie Lamontagne; Bradley Koehler	Mixed team	Lodge / Hill (AUS); **L** 19–52	Did not advance			

Ski cross
Individual

Athlete	Event	Group heats		Semifinal	Final
Athlete	Event	Points	Rank	Position	Position
William Johnston	Men's ski cross	14	7	Did not advance	
Cole Merrett	Men's ski cross	15	5	Did not advance	
Anne-Marie Joncas	Women's ski cross	15	6	Did not advance	
Kael Oberlander	Women's ski cross	17	4 **Q**	4 **SF**	7

Team

Athlete	Event	Pre-heats	Quarterfinal	Semifinal	Final
Athlete	Event	Position	Position	Position	Position
William Johnston; Anne-Marie Joncas	Team ski cross	2 **Q**	4	Did not advance	
Cole Merrett; Kael Oberlander	Team ski cross	—N/a	3	Did not advance	

Halfpipe, Slopestyle & Big Air

Athlete	Event	Qualification				Final				
Athlete	Event	Run 1	Run 2	Best	Rank	Run 1	Run 2	Run 3	Best	Rank
Quincy Barr	Men's halfpipe	47.50	52.75	52.75	11	Did not advance				
**Charlie Beatty**	Men's big air	86.00	86.75	86.75	5 **Q**	86.50	89.25	88.50	177.75	1st place, gold medalist(s)
**Charlie Beatty**	Men's slopestyle	24.50	92.25	92.25	1 **Q**	33.50	13.75	37.75	37.75	10
Matthew Lepine	Men's big air	DNS								
Matthew Lepine	Men's slopestyle	72.75	25.25	72.75	10 **Q**	45.50	62.25	19.50	62.25	8
Trent Morozumi	Men's halfpipe	31.75	22.25	31.75	13	Did not advance				
Gabrielle Dinn	Women's big air	64.00	15.75	64.00	11	Did not advance				
Gabrielle Dinn	Women's slopestyle	16.50	42.00	42.00	14	Did not advance				
Ella Garrod	Women's big air	12.75	58.50	58.50	13	Did not advance				
Ella Garrod	Women's slopestyle	57.75	56.25	57.75	10 **Q**	45.25	56.50	39.50	56.50	7

- In the final of the big air events, the top two run scores are considered.

== Ice hockey ==
Summary

Key:

- OT – Overtime
- GWS – Match decided by penalty-shootout

Team	Event	Group stage			Semifinal	Final	
Team	Event	Opposition Score	Opposition Score	Rank	Opposition Score	Opposition Score	Rank
Canada men's	Men's tournament	South Korea; **W** 8–0	Finland; **W** 4–1	1 **Q**	United States; **L** 5–6 GWS	Finland; **L** 4–5 GWS	4

=== Men's tournament ===
Canada qualified a men's hockey team of 18 athletes. The team was officially named on December 20, 2023.

Roster

- Mateo Beites (G)
- Colin Ellsworth (G)
- Carter Esler (G)
- Cameron Chartrand (D)
- Callum Croskery (D)
- Ryan Lin (D)
- Zach Nyman (D)
- Daxon Rudolph (D)
- Keaton Verhoeff (D)
- Alessandro Di Iorio (F)
- Beckham Edwards (F)
- Tynan Lawrence (F)
- Aiden O'Donnell (F)
- Mathis Preston (F)
- Liam Ruck (F)
- Markus Ruck (F)
- Adam Valentini (F)
- Braidy Wassilyn (F)

Group B

Pos	Team	Pld	W	SOW	SOL	L	GF	GA	GD	Pts	Qualification
1	Canada	2	2	0	0	0	12	1	+11	**6**	Semifinals
2	Finland	2	1	0	0	1	4	5	−1	**3**	Semifinals
3	South Korea (H)	2	0	0	0	2	1	11	−10	**0**	

Source: Gangwon 2024
(H) Host

27 January 2024; 20:00	South Korea	**0–8** (0–3, 0–2, 0–3)	**Canada**	Gangneung Hockey Centre; Attendance: 3,877

Game reference

Lim Jae-hun
Goalies
Carter Esler
Colin Ellsworth
Referees:
(Norway) Oskar Øvstedal
(Netherlands) Adler Steenstra
Linesmen:
(Uzbekistan) David Prokofyev
(Sweden) Niclas Westman

0–1	01:38 – Preston (M. Ruck, Lin) (PP)
0–2	03:03 – L. Ruck (Preston) (PP)
0–3	11:32 – L. Ruck (M. Ruck, Verhoeff)
0–4	15:09 – Di Iorio
0–5	21:34 – L. Ruck (M. Ruck) (SH)
0–6	35:32 – Lawrence (O'Donnell)
0–7	38:25 – O'Donnell (Di Iorio) (SH)
0–8	44:52 – Valentini

6 min
Penalties
3 min
6
Shots
53

29 January 2024; 20:00	**Canada**	**4–1** (1–0, 0–0, 3–1)	Finland	Gangneung Hockey Centre; Attendance: 2,083

Game reference

Carter Esler
Goalies
Pyry Lammi
Referees:
(Denmark) Rasmus Ankersen
(Norway) Oskar Øvstedal
Linesmen:
(South Korea) Lim Jun-seo
(Czech Republic) David Thuma

Di Iorio (Edwards) – 11:40	1–0
Di Iorio (Chartrand) – 35:03	2–0
Lin (SH2) – 37:52	3–0
	3–1	38:32 – Alalauri (Piiparinen, Suvanto) (PP2)
Di Iorio (O'Donnell) (ENG) – 43:20	4–1

9 min
Penalties
4.5 min
39
Shots
19

Semifinal

30 January 2024; 20:00	Canada	**5–6 GWS** (0–0, 2–3, 3–2) (SO: 0–1)	**United States**	Gangneung Hockey Centre; Attendance: 2,238

Game reference

Carter Esler
Mateo Beites
Goalies
Xavier Wendt
Referees:
(Norway) Oskar Øvstedal
(United Kingdom) Joseph Sewell
Linesmen:
(Czech Republic) David Thuma
(Sweden) Niclas Westman

	0–1	16:39 – Trottier
Di Iorio – 17:19	1–1
	1–2	17:58 – Hurlbert (Stuart)
	1–3	19:44 – Gordon-Carroll (Torre)
Nyman (Lin, Preston) (PP2) – 22:38	2–3
Preston – 30:29	3–3
	3–4	32:22 – Trottier (Berchild)
Preston (Lawrence) – 38:31	4–4
	4–5	39:59 – Trottier (Martyniuk, Schairer)
Nyman (Verhoeff, Lawrence) – 42:54	5–5

Di Iorio (miss)
Preston (miss)
Nyman (miss)
Shootout
Hurlbert
(miss) Berchild
(miss) Francisco
1.5 min
Penalties
6 min
42
Shots
17

Bronze medal match

31 January 2024; 13:00	Canada	**4–5 GWS** (3–2, 0–2, 1–0) (SO: 0–1)	**Finland**	Gangneung Hockey Centre; Attendance: 4,652

Game reference

Carter Esler
Goalies
William Gammals
Pyry Lammi
Referees:
(Norway) Oskar Øvstedal
(United Kingdom) Joseph Sewell
Linesmen:
(South Korea) Lim Jun-seo
(Sweden) Niclas Westman

Di Iorio (Edwards) – 06:15	1–0
Lawrence (Lin, O'Donnell) – 06:46	2–0
Verhoeff (Wassilyn) – 06:58	3–0
	3–1	07:27 – Laitinen (Myllyniemi, Rinne)
	3–2	08:20 – Arkko (Kähkönen, Kallio) (PP)
	3–3	25:34 – Kallio (Nuutinen, Suvanto)
	3–4	27:18 – Kähkönen (Arkko, Piiparinen) (PP)
Preston (Lin) – 38:58	4–4

Preston (miss)
Valentini (miss)
Shootout
Uronen
Myllyniemi
7.5 min
Penalties
1.5 min
36
Shots
37

== Luge ==
Canada qualified three lugers (one man and two women). The team was named on December 19, 2023.

Athlete	Event	Run 1		Run 2		Total	
Athlete	Event	Time	Rank	Time	Rank	Time	Rank
Bastian van Wouw	Men's singles	47.450	8	47.247	7	1:34.697	8
Ava Lucia Huerta	Women's singles	51.087	27	51.998	30	1:43.085	28
Maya Yuen	Women's singles	49.288	15	48.989	10	1:38.277	11

== Short track speed skating ==
Canada qualified four short track speed skaters (two per gender). The team was named on December 21, 2023.

Individual

Athlete	Event	Heats		Quarterfinal		Semifinal		Final	
Athlete	Event	Time	Rank	Time	Rank	Time	Rank	Time	Rank
Victor Chartrand	Men's 500 m	42.248	1 **Q**	1:13.126	5	Did not advance			
Victor Chartrand	Men's 1000 m	1:33.485	1 **Q**	1:48.478	5	Did not advance			
Victor Chartrand	Men's 1500 m	—N/a		2:31.035	2 **Q**	2:24.838	6	Did not advance	
Alexis Dubuc-Bilodeau	Men's 500 m	42.702	2 **Q**	42.652	2 **Q**	43.005	4 **FB**	42.802	7
Alexis Dubuc-Bilodeau	Men's 1000 m	1:29.623	3	Did not advance					
Alexis Dubuc-Bilodeau	Men's 1500 m	—N/a		3:04.860	6	Did not advance			
Courtney Chalong	Women's 500 m	45.542	2 **Q**	45.019	4	Did not advance			
Courtney Chalong	Women's 1000 m	1:36.743	2 **Q**	1:33.719	3	Did not advance			
Courtney Chalong	Women's 1500 m	—N/a		2:24.838	2 **Q**	3:05.219	**ADVB**	2:44.733	11
Océane Guérard	Women's 500 m	45.367	2 **Q**	44.861	3 **q**	44.639	5 **FB**	45.854	6
Océane Guérard	Women's 1000 m	1:37.336	3 **q**	1:33.025	2 **Q**	1:33.209	4 **FB**	1:33.401	10
Océane Guérard	Women's 1500 m	—N/a		2:28.482	3 **Q**	PEN		Did not advance	

- Ranks are within the heat, except in the finals where an overall rank is provided.

Mixed

Athlete	Event	Semifinal		Final	
Athlete	Event	Time	Rank	Time	Rank
Victor Chartrand; Alexis Dubuc-Bilodeau; Courtney Chalong; Océane Guérard	Mixed relay	2:47.966	2 **FA**	3:00.867	4

== Ski jumping ==
Canada qualified one male ski jumper. The team was named on December 20, 2023.

Individual

Athlete	Event	First round			Final			Total	
Athlete	Event	Distance	Points	Rank	Distance	Points	Rank	Points	Rank
Tarik VanWieren	Men's normal hill	75.0	50.9	32	77.0	47.2	35	98.1	33

== Snowboarding ==
Canada qualified ten snowboarders (four men and six women). The team was named on December 22, 2023.

Snowboard cross
Individual

Athlete	Event	Group heats		Semifinal	Final
Athlete	Event	Points	Rank	Rank	Rank
Olivier Gagne	Men's snowboard cross	14	7	Did not advance	
**Anthony Shelly**	Men's snowboard cross	19	1 **Q**	2 **FA**	2nd place, silver medalist(s)
Rose Savard-Ferguson	Women's snowboard cross	17	5	Did not advance	
Hannah Turkington	Women's snowboard cross	16	4 **Q**	3 **FB**	5

Mixed

Athlete	Event	Pre-heats	Quarterfinal	Semifinal	Final
Athlete	Event	Position	Position	Position	Position
Olivier Gagne; Rose Savard-Ferguson	Team snowboard cross	1 **Q**	4	Did not advance	
Anthony Shelly; Hannah Turkington	Team snowboard cross	—N/a	RAL	Did not advance	

Halfpipe, Slopestyle & Big Air

Athlete	Event	Qualification				Final				
Athlete	Event	Run 1	Run 2	Best	Rank	Run 1	Run 2	Run 3	Best	Rank
**Eli Bouchard**	Men's slopestyle	83.25	59.50	83.25	1 **Q**	87.25	90.00	82.25	90.00	2nd place, silver medalist(s)
**Eli Bouchard**	Men's big air	96.00	31.00	96.00	1 **Q**	92.25	91.00	42.00	183.25	1st place, gold medalist(s)
Neko Reimer	Men's slopestyle	8.50	65.50	65.50	5 **Q**	8.25	16.00	21.25	21.25	10
Neko Reimer	Men's big air	17.25	54.25	54.25	12	Did not advance				
Felicity Geremia	Women's halfpipe	58.50	60.50	60.50	9 **Q**	43.00	47.50	46.50	47.50	9
Amalia Pelchat	Women's slopestyle	56.25	66.00	66.00	5 **Q**	53.50	29.50	23.25	53.50	9
Amalia Pelchat	Women's big air	21.00	30.75	30.75	17	Did not advance				
Avery Spalding	Women's slopestyle	34.00	25.00	34.00	14	Did not advance				
Avery Spalding	Women's big air	13.00	37.00	37.00	16	Did not advance				
Lily-Ann Ulmer	Women's halfpipe	36.50	39.50	39.50	13	Did not advance				

== Non-competing sports ==
=== Speed skating ===
Canada originally qualified one male quota spot, but this was declined by Speed Skating Canada.

== See also ==
- Canada at the 2024 Summer Olympics
