= 2026 World Junior Short Track Speed Skating Championships =

International speed skating competition

ISU World Junior Short Track Speed Skating Championships 2026
- Venue: Utah Olympic Oval, Salt Lake City, United States
- Dates: 29 January - 1 February 2026

The 2026 World Junior Short Track Speed Skating Championships took place from 29 January to 1 February 2026 at the Utah Olympic Oval in Salt Lake City, United States. South Korea, Japan, and China dominated the championship.

== Medal summary ==
=== Medal table ===
* Host nation (United States)

Rank	Nation	Gold	Silver	Bronze	Total
1	South Korea	4	4	0	8
2	Japan	2	1	3	6
3	China	1	3	1	5
4	Canada	1	0	1	2
4	United States*	1	0	1	2
6	Netherlands	0	1	0	1
7	Kazakhstan	0	0	2	2
8	Hungary	0	0	1	1
Totals (8 entries)		9	9	9	27

=== Medalists ===
==== Men ====
Event	Gold		Silver		Bronze	
500 metres	Sean Shuai; United States	41.031	Lee Yoon-seok; South Korea	41.585	Taiga Sasaki; Japan	41.615
1000 metres	Park Seo-jun; South Korea	1:23.802	Li Yuheng; China	1:23.903	Bogdan Vekhov; Kazakhstan	1:24.177
1500 metres	Taiga Sasaki; Japan	2:24.100	Wang Tianyou; China	2:24.363	Yuta Fuchigami; Japan	2:24.695
3000 metres relay	China; Li Yuheng; Wang Tianyou; Zhang Zixia; Zhang Xinzhe	3:57.832	Japan; Yuta Fuchigami; Raito Kida; Taiga Sasaki; Hirochika Yamaguchi	3:58.997	United States; Wesley Jones; Julius Kazanecki; Sean Shuai; Benjamin Sullivan	4:06.253

==== Women ====
Event	Gold		Silver		Bronze	
500 metres	Courtney Charlong; Canada	43.601	Oh Song-mi; South Korea	43.732	Kíra Judit Amschl; Hungary	43.929
1000 metres	Ayano Sekiguchi; Japan	1:29.915	Kang Min-ji; South Korea	1:29.953	Courtney Charlong; Canada	1:30.269
1500 metres	Oh Song-mi; South Korea	2:25.908	Kim Min-ji; South Korea	2:25.909	Hao Ruoxuan; China	2:26.131
3000 metres relay	South Korea; Kang Min-ji; Kim Min-ji; Oh Song-mi; Yu Su-min	4:11.611	China; Hao Ruoxuan; Kuang Junyu; Li Jinzi; Lin Jingyi	4:12.345	Kazakhstan; Anastassiya Galechina; Nuria Alpysbay; Polina Omelchuk; Guldana Zhalmukhan	4:19.054

==== Mixed ====
Event	Gold		Silver		Bronze	
2000 metre relay	South Korea; Kim Min-ji; Oh Song-mi; Lee Yoon-seok; Park Seo-jun; Kang Min-ji; Kim You-sung	2:42.149	Netherlands; Birgit Radt; Djoeke Schmitz; Jesper Schmitz; Tsjerk van der Meer; Jonas de Jong	2:45.709	Japan; Sarasa Kinami; Ayano Sekiguchi; Raito Kida; Taiga Sasaki; Akemi Ishikawa; Yuta Fuchigami	2:44.071
