= Nigeria at the 2024 Winter Youth Olympics =

- Flag of Nigeria
- IOC code: NGR
- NOC: Nigerian Olympic Committee

in Gangwon, South Korea 19 January 2024 – 1 February 2024
- Competitors: 6 in 1 sport
- Flag bearers (opening): Roy Daniel & Oluwanimifise Wale-Adeogun
- Flag bearer (closing): TBD
- Medals: Gold 0 Silver 0 Bronze 0 Total 0

Winter Youth Olympics appearances (overview)
- 2024

Nigeria is scheduled to compete at the 2024 Winter Youth Olympics in Gangwon, South Korea, from January 19 to February 1, 2024. This will be Nigeria's debut appearance at the Winter Youth Olympic Games.

The Nigerian team consisted of six athletes (three per gender) competing in curling. Curlers Roy Daniel and Oluwanimifise Wale-Adeogun were the country's flagbearers during the opening ceremony.

== Competitors ==
The following is the list of number of competitors (per gender) participating at the games per sport/discipline.

Sport	Men	Women	Total
Curling	3	3	6
Total	3	3	6

== Curling ==
Nigeria qualified a mixed team and mixed doubles pair for a total of six athletes. Nigeria was the first African curling team to qualify for the Winter Youth Olympics, as no African nation was represented in curling at the first three Games.

Summary

Team	Event	Group Stage								Quarterfinal	Semifinal	Final / BM	
Team	Event	Opposition Score	Opposition Score	Opposition Score	Opposition Score	Opposition Score	Opposition Score	Opposition Score	Rank	Opposition Score	Opposition Score	Opposition Score	Rank
Goodnews Charles; Oluwanimifise Wale-Adeogun; Faitu Danmola; Nkoyo Oku	Mixed team	Japan; L 1–20	Turkey; L 2–22	Norway; L 0–21	New Zealand; L 1–12	United States; L 0–20	China; L 2–22	Sweden; L 0–16	8	Did not advance			16
Oluwatomisin Akinsanya; Roy Daniel	Mixed doubles	Hungary; L 3–13	Great Britain; L 0–18	Czech Republic; L 0–19	Canada; L 0–14	South Korea; L 1–17	—N/a		6	Did not advance			24

=== Mixed team ===
Group A	Skip	W	L	W–L	PF	PA	EW	EL	BE	SE	DSC
China	Li Zetai	6	1	1–0	65	25	28	17	0	12	59.04
United States	Kenna Ponzio	6	1	0–1	68	26	31	16	1	15	51.38
Japan	Kaito Fujii	5	2	1–0	64	26	27	17	2	11	39.53
Sweden	Vilmer Nygren	5	2	0–1	55	42	27	19	5	10	58.05
Norway	Alexander Johansen	3	4	–	49	39	25	19	2	11	65.33
Turkey	Muhammed Taha Zenit	2	5	–	41	40	16	26	5	5	82.17
New Zealand	Jed Nevill	1	6	–	27	44	18	23	3	6	86.52
Nigeria	Goodnews Charles	0	7	–	6	133	4	39	1	0	199.60

Round robin

Draw 1

Saturday, January 20, 10:00

Sheet B	1	2	3	4	5	6	7	8	Final
Japan (Fujii) 🔨	5	0	4	5	3	3	X	X	20
Nigeria (Charles)	0	1	0	0	0	0	X	X	1

Draw 2

Saturday, January 20, 18:00

Sheet A	1	2	3	4	5	6	7	8	Final
Nigeria (Charles)	0	0	0	0	0	2	X	X	2
Turkey (Zenit) 🔨	8	2	3	4	5	0	X	X	22

Draw 3

Sunday, January 21, 14:00

Sheet C	1	2	3	4	5	6	7	8	Final
Nigeria (Charles)	0	0	0	0	0	0	X	X	0
Norway (Johansen) 🔨	2	5	4	6	2	2	X	X	21

Draw 4

Monday, January 22, 10:00

Sheet A	1	2	3	4	5	6	7	8	Final
New Zealand (Nevill) 🔨	4	2	0	0	2	1	3	X	12
Nigeria (Charles)	0	0	0	1	0	0	0	X	1

Draw 5

Monday, January 22, 18:00

Sheet D	1	2	3	4	5	6	7	8	Final
Nigeria (Charles)	0	0	0	0	0	0	X	X	0
United States (Ponzio) 🔨	4	3	3	1	6	3	X	X	20

Draw 6

Tuesday, January 23, 14:00

Sheet B	1	2	3	4	5	6	7	8	Final
Nigeria (Charles)	0	0	0	2	0	0	X	X	2
China (Li) 🔨	6	3	5	0	6	2	X	X	22

Draw 7

Wednesday, January 24, 9:00

Sheet D	1	2	3	4	5	6	7	8	Final
Sweden (Nygren) 🔨	3	2	3	3	1	2	2	X	16
Nigeria (Charles)	0	0	0	0	0	0	0	X	0

=== Mixed doubles ===
Group A	W	L	W–L	DSC
Great Britain	4	1	1–0	40.06
Czech Republic	4	1	0–1	42.84
Canada	3	2	–	54.69
Hungary	2	3	1–0	89.06
South Korea	2	3	0–1	38.09
Nigeria	0	5	–	168.42

Round robin

Draw 1

Friday, January 26, 18:00

Sheet D	1	2	3	4	5	6	7	8	Final
Nigeria (Akinsanya / Daniel)	0	0	2	0	0	0	1	X	3
Hungary (Nagy / Kárász) 🔨	4	1	0	5	2	1	0	X	13

Draw 2

Saturday, January 27, 10:00

Sheet C	1	2	3	4	5	6	7	8	Final
Great Britain (Soutar / Brewster) 🔨	5	2	1	5	3	2	X	X	18
Nigeria (Akinsanya / Daniel)	0	0	0	0	0	0	X	X	0

Draw 7

Sunday, January 28, 18:00

Sheet A	1	2	3	4	5	6	7	8	Final
Czech Republic (Zelingrová / Bláha) 🔨	1	3	5	2	4	4	X	X	19
Nigeria (Akinsanya / Daniel)	0	0	0	0	0	0	X	X	0

Draw 9

Monday, January 29, 14:00

Sheet A	1	2	3	4	5	6	7	8	Final
Nigeria (Akinsanya / Daniel)	0	0	0	0	0	0	0	X	0
Canada (Locke / Perry) 🔨	6	1	2	1	1	1	2	X	14

Draw 11

Tuesday, January 30, 10:00

Sheet B	1	2	3	4	5	6	7	8	Final
South Korea (Lee / Lee) 🔨	1	3	3	4	0	6	X	X	17
Nigeria (Akinsanya / Daniel)	0	0	0	0	1	0	X	X	1

== See also ==
- Nigeria at the 2024 Summer Olympics
