= Singapore at the 2024 Winter Youth Olympics =

- Flag of Singapore
- IOC code: SGP
- NOC: Singapore National Olympic Committee

in Gangwon, South Korea 19 January 2024 – 1 February 2024
- Competitors: 2 in 1 sport
- Flag bearers (opening): Ryo Ong & Amelia Chua
- Flag bearer (closing): TBD
- Medals: Gold 0 Silver 0 Bronze 0 Total 0

Winter Youth Olympics appearances
- 2020; 2024

Singapore is scheduled to compete at the 2024 Winter Youth Olympics in Gangwon, South Korea, from January 19 to February 1, 2024. This will be Singapore's second appearance at the Winter Youth Olympic Games, having competed debuted at the previous edition in 2020.

The Singaporean team consisted of two athletes (one per gender) competing in short track speed skating. Short track speed skaters Ryo Ong and Amelia Chua were the country's flagbearers during the opening ceremony.

== Competitors ==
The following is the list of number of competitors (per gender) participating at the games per sport/discipline.

Sport	Men	Women	Total
Short track speed skating	1	1	2
Total	1	1	2

== Short track speed skating ==
Singapore qualified two short track speed skaters (one per gender). Originally Singapore earned one quota, but was later awarded an additional quota as part of the reallocation of unused quota spots process. Singapore's best result was a 13th place finish by Ryo Ong, in the men's 1500 metres event. This marked the first time an athlete from Singapore advanced to the semifinals of an event at the Winter Youth Olympics.

Athlete	Event	Heats		Quarterfinal		Semifinal		Final	
Athlete	Event	Time	Rank	Time	Rank	Time	Rank	Time	Rank
Ryo Ong	Men's 500 m	44.938	4	Did not advance					
Ryo Ong	Men's 1000 m	1:37.674	3	Did not advance					
Ryo Ong	Men's 1500 m	—N/a		2:25.282	3 Q	2:38.401	3 FB	2:38.401	13
Amelia Chua	Women's 500 m	48.311	3	Did not advance					
Amelia Chua	Women's 1000 m	1:38.738	4	Did not advance					
Amelia Chua	Women's 1500 m	—N/a		2:42.567	6	Did not advance			

- Ranks are within heats, except finals.

== See also ==
- Singapore at the 2024 Summer Olympics
