= Serbia at the 2024 Winter Youth Olympics =

- Flag of Serbia
- IOC code: SRB
- NOC: Serbian Olympic Committee

in Gangwon, South Korea 19 January 2024 – 1 February 2024
- Competitors: 7 in 5 sports
- Flag bearer (opening): Hanna Braun & Luka Jašić
- Flag bearer (closing): TBD
- Medals: Gold 0 Silver 0 Bronze 0 Total 0

Winter Youth Olympics appearances
- 2012; 2016; 2020; 2024

Serbia is scheduled to compete at the 2024 Winter Youth Olympics in Gangwon, South Korea, from 19 January to 1 February 2024, This will be Serbia's fourth appearance at the Winter Youth Olympic Games, having competed at every Games since the inaugural edition in 2012.

Short track speed skater Luka Jašić and biathlete Hanna Braun were the country's flagbearers during the opening ceremony.

== Competitors ==
The following is the list of number of competitors (per gender) participating at the games per sport/discipline.

Sport	Men	Women	Total
Alpine skiing	1	0	1
Biathlon	1	1	2
Cross-country skiing	1	0	1
Short track speed skating	1	0	1
Skeleton	2	0	2
Total	6	1	7

== Alpine skiing ==
Serbia qualified one male alpine skier.

Athlete	Event	Run 1		Run 2		Total	
Athlete	Event	Time	Rank	Time	Rank	Time	Rank
Aleksa Lalić	Super-G	DNS					
Aleksa Lalić	Giant slalom	52.02	32	48.27	27	1:40.29	25
Aleksa Lalić	Slalom	51.70	38	57.36	24	1:49.06	24
Aleksa Lalić	Combined	DNS					

== Biathlon ==
Athlete	Event	Time	Misses	Rank
Abdulkerim Hodžić	Men's sprint	54:05.0	8 (3+0+3+2)	82
Abdulkerim Hodžić	Men's 12 km individual	27:20.0	5 (2+3)	81
Hanna Braun	Women's sprint	27:01.6	6 (4+2)	72
Hanna Braun	Women's 10 km individual	45:28.2	5 (2+2+2+1)	60
Hanna Braun; Abdulkerim Hodžić	Single mixed relay	52:12.4	4+16	22

== Cross-country skiing ==
Serbia qualified one male cross-country skier.

Athlete	Event	Qualification		Quarterfinal		Semifinal		Final	
Athlete	Event	Time	Rank	Time	Rank	Time	Rank	Time	Rank
Andrija Tošić	7.5 km classical	—						24:23.8	60
Andrija Tošić	Sprint freestyle	3:36.45	61	Did not advance					

== Short track speed skating ==
Athlete	Event	Heats		Quarterfinal		Semifinal		Final	
Athlete	Event	Time	Rank	Time	Rank	Time	Rank	Time	Rank
Luka Jašić	500 m	42.762	3	Did not advance					
Luka Jašić	1000 m	1:32.386	2 Q	1:30.192	3	Did not advance			
Luka Jašić	1500 m	—		2:23.412	2 Q		ADVB	B - DNS	

== Skeleton ==
Athlete	Event	Run 1		Run 2		Total	
Athlete	Event	Time	Rank	Time	Rank	Time	Rank
Bogdan Despotović	Men's	56.15	17	56.90	18	1:53.05	16
Lazar Mikić	Men's	56.07	16	56.46	15	1:52.53	15

== See also ==
- Serbia at the 2024 Summer Olympics
