= Lee Yoon-seung =

South Korean freestyle skier (born 2006)

Personal information
- Born: 5 October 2006 (age 20) Seoul, South Korea

Sport
- Country: South Korea
- Sport: Freestyle skiing
- Event: Moguls
Medal record
Men's freestyle skiing
Representing South Korea
Winter Youth Olympics
Gold medal – first place	2024 Gangwon	Dual moguls
Junior World Championships
Bronze medal – third place	2025 Almaty	Moguls

Lee Yoon-seung (Korean: 이윤승; born 5 October 2006) is a South Korean freestyle skier specializing in moguls. He is a 2024 Winter Youth Olympic gold medalist in dual moguls and competed at the 2026 Winter Olympics.

== Career ==
Lee represented South Korea at the 2024 Winter Youth Olympics and won a gold medal in the dual moguls event. He then competed at the 2025 FIS Freestyle Junior World Ski Championships and won a bronze medal in moguls with a score of 72.79 points.

In January 2026, he was selected to represent South Korea at the 2026 Winter Olympics.
