= Belgium at the 2024 Winter Youth Olympics =

- Flag of Belgium
- IOC code: BEL
- NOC: Belgian Olympic Committee

in Gangwon, South Korea 19 January 2024 – 1 February 2024
- Competitors: 2 in 2 sports
- Flag bearer (opening): Lowie Dekens
- Flag bearer (closing): TBD
- Medals: Gold 0 Silver 0 Bronze 0 Total 0

Winter Youth Olympics appearances (overview)
- 2012; 2016; 2020; 2024

Belgium is scheduled to compete at the 2024 Winter Youth Olympics in Gangwon, South Korea, from January 19 to February 1, 2024. This will be Belgium's fourth appearance at the Winter Youth Olympic Games, having competed at every Games since the inaugural edition in 2012.

The Belgian team consisted of two male athletes competing in two sports. Short track speed skater Lowie Dekens was the country's flagbearer during the opening ceremony.

== Competitors ==
The following is the list of number of competitors (per gender) participating at the games per sport/discipline.

Sport	Men	Women	Total
Alpine skiing	1	0	1
Short track speed skating	1	0	1
Total	2	0	2

== Alpine skiing ==
Belgium qualified one male alpine skier.

Men

Athlete	Event	Run 1		Run 2		Total	
Athlete	Event	Time	Rank	Time	Rank	Time	Rank
Christos Bouas	Giant slalom	52.27	34	48.93	33	1:41.20	30
Christos Bouas	Slalom	49.85	29	54.12	14	1:43.97	15

== Short track speed skating ==
Belgium qualified one male short track speed skater.

Men

Athlete	Event	Heats		Quarterfinal		Semifinal		Final	
Athlete	Event	Time	Rank	Time	Rank	Time	Rank	Time	Rank
Lowie Dekens	500 m	43.758	4	Did not advance					
Lowie Dekens	1000 m	1:41.848	4	Did not advance					
Lowie Dekens	1500 m	—N/a		2:18.473	4 q	2:34.308	5	Did not advance	

== See also ==
- Belgium at the 2024 Summer Olympics
