= Japan at the 2024 Winter Youth Olympics =

- Flag of Japan
- IOC code: JPN
- NOC: Japanese Olympic Committee

in Gangwon, South Korea 19 January 2024 – 1 February 2024
- Competitors: 65 in 11 sports
- Flag bearers: Kaito Fujii & Yuzuki Sato
- Medals Ranked 10th: Gold 3 Silver 4 Bronze 8 Total 15

Winter Youth Olympics appearances (overview)
- 2012; 2016; 2020; 2024

Japan is scheduled to compete at the 2024 Winter Youth Olympics in Gangwon, South Korea, from January 19 to February 1, 2024. This will be Japan's fourth appearance at the Winter Youth Olympic Games, having competed at every Games since the inaugural edition in 2012.

The Japanese team consisted of 65 athletes. Curler Kaito Fujii and ski jumper Yuzuki Sato were the country's flagbearers during the opening ceremony.

== Competitors ==
The following is the list of number of competitors (per gender) participating at the games per sport/discipline.

Sport	Men	Women	Total
Alpine skiing	1	2	3
Cross-country skiing	1	2	3
Curling	3	3	6
Figure skating	2	2	4
Freestyle skiing	5	5	10
Ice hockey	0	18	18
Nordic combined	2	2	4
Short track speed skating	2	2	4
Ski jumping	2	2	4
Snowboarding	3	5	8
Speed skating	2	2	4
Total	20	40	60

== Medalists ==
Medal	Name	Sport	Event	Date
Gold	Yura Murase	Snowboarding	Women's big air	28 January
Gold	Mao Shimada	Figure skating	Women's singles	29 January
Gold	Rise Kudo	Snowboarding	Women's halfpipe	1 February
Silver	Olly Nicholls	Freestyle skiing	Men's slopestyle	25 January
Silver	Olly Nicholls	Freestyle skiing	Men's big air	28 January
Silver	Suzuno Fukuda; Yumin Furuhira; Rio Suzuki; Mayu Hosogoe; Riko Nishiuchi; Lily Sato; Rino Tada (A); Kika Terauchi (C); Nana Akimoto; Momona Fukuzawa; Tsumugi Ito; Reina Kakuta; Saika Kiyokawa; Azumi Numabe; Umeka Odaira; Momoka Okamura; Koko Ruike; Nanaho Yamaguchi	Ice hockey	Women's tournament	31 January
Silver	Sara Shimizu	Snowboarding	Women's halfpipe	1 February
Bronze	Nonomi Inoue	Short track speed skating	Women's 1500 metres	20 January
Bronze	Raito Kida	Short track speed skating	Men's 1000 metres	21 January
Bronze	Waka Sasabuchi	Speed skating	Women's 500 metres	22 January
Bronze	Sota Kubo	Speed skating	Men's 1500 metres	23 January
Bronze	Nonomi Inoue; Aoi Yoshizawa; Yuta Fuchigami; Raito Kida	Short track speed skating	Mixed relay	24 January
Bronze	Takuto Nakamura	Freestyle skiing	Men's dual moguls	27 January
Bronze	Yo Takagi	Figure skating	Women's singles	29 January
Bronze	Ryusei Yamada	Snowboarding	Men's halfpipe	1 February

== Alpine skiing ==
Japan qualified three alpine skiers (one man and two women).

Men

Athlete	Event	Run 1		Run 2		Total	
Athlete	Event	Time	Rank	Time	Rank	Time	Rank
Neo Kamada	Super-G	—N/a				56.20	27
Neo Kamada	Giant slalom	51.31	24	46.42	10	1:37.73	17
Neo Kamada	Slalom	48.15	9	51.94	2	1:40.09	4
Neo Kamada	Combined	57.36	36	55.39	8	1:52.75	21

Women

Athlete	Event	Run 1		Run 2		Total	
Athlete	Event	Time	Rank	Time	Rank	Time	Rank
Hinata Fukasawa	Super-G	—N/a				56.42	26
Hinata Fukasawa	Giant slalom	DNF					
Hinata Fukasawa	Slalom	DNF					
Hinata Fukasawa	Combined	59.25	32	54.74	21	1:53.99	22
Mikoto Onishi	Super-G	—N/a				56.08	21
Mikoto Onishi	Giant slalom	50.14	13	DNF			
Mikoto Onishi	Slalom	DNF					
Mikoto Onishi	Combined	57.49	12	53.05	11	1:50.54	11

Mixed

Athlete	Event	Round of 16	Quarterfinals	Semifinals	Final / BM	
Athlete	Event	Opposition Result	Opposition Result	Opposition Result	Opposition Result	Rank
Mikoto Onishi; Neo Kamada	Parallel mixed team	Austria; L 1–3	Did not advance			

== Cross-country skiing ==
Japan qualified three cross-country skiers (one man and two women).

Men

Athlete	Event	Qualification		Quarterfinal		Semifinal		Final	
Athlete	Event	Time	Rank	Time	Rank	Time	Rank	Time	Rank
Kosuke Fujimoto	7.5 km classical	—N/a						21:15.0	29
Kosuke Fujimoto	Sprint freestyle	3:14.41	32	Did not advance					

Women

Athlete	Event	Qualification		Quarterfinal		Semifinal		Final	
Athlete	Event	Time	Rank	Time	Rank	Time	Rank	Time	Rank
Yuka Fukuhara	7.5 km classical	—N/a						24:29.2	30
Yuka Fukuhara	Sprint freestyle	3:56.78	42	Did not advance					
Kokoro Matsuzawa	7.5 km classical	—N/a						24:02.6	23
Kokoro Matsuzawa	Sprint freestyle	3:42.32	22 Q	3:38.06	4	Did not advance			

== Curling ==
Japan qualified a mixed team and mixed doubles pair for a total of six athletes.

Summary

Team	Event	Group Stage								Quarterfinal	Semifinal	Final / BM	
Team	Event	Opposition Score	Opposition Score	Opposition Score	Opposition Score	Opposition Score	Opposition Score	Opposition Score	Rank	Opposition Score	Opposition Score	Opposition Score	Rank
Kaito Fujii; Satsuki Maruzeni; Koei Sato; Himari Ichiyama	Mixed team	Nigeria; W 20–1	China; L 6–7	Sweden; W 10–2	United States; L 6–8	New Zealand; W 6–2	Turkey; W 8–2	Norway; W 8–4	3 Q	Denmark; L 3–8	Did not advance		6
Moka Tanaka; Shinya Kawai	Mixed doubles	China; L 5–7	Brazil; W 11–1	Turkey; W 9–5	New Zealand; W 11–2	Latvia; W 5–4	—N/a		2 Q	Denmark; L 7–9	Did not advance		7

=== Mixed team ===
Group A	Skip	W	L	W–L	PF	PA	EW	EL	BE	SE	DSC
China	Li Zetai	6	1	1–0	65	25	28	17	0	12	59.04
United States	Kenna Ponzio	6	1	0–1	68	26	31	16	1	15	51.38
Japan	Kaito Fujii	5	2	1–0	64	26	27	17	2	11	39.53
Sweden	Vilmer Nygren	5	2	0–1	55	42	27	19	5	10	58.05
Norway	Alexander Johansen	3	4	–	49	39	25	19	2	11	65.33
Turkey	Muhammed Taha Zenit	2	5	–	41	40	16	26	5	5	82.17
New Zealand	Jed Nevill	1	6	–	27	44	18	23	3	6	86.52
Nigeria	Goodnews Charles	0	7	–	6	133	4	39	1	0	199.60

Round robin

Draw 1

Saturday, January 20, 10:00

Sheet B	1	2	3	4	5	6	7	8	Final
Japan (Fujii) 🔨	5	0	4	5	3	3	X	X	20
Nigeria (Charles)	0	1	0	0	0	0	X	X	1

Draw 2

Saturday, January 20, 18:00

Sheet D	1	2	3	4	5	6	7	8	Final
Japan (Fujii) 🔨	2	0	1	0	0	3	0	0	6
China (Li)	0	2	0	1	0	0	2	2	7

Draw 3

Sunday, January 21, 14:00

Sheet A	1	2	3	4	5	6	7	8	Final
Japan (Fujii) 🔨	6	2	1	1	0	0	X	X	10
Sweden (Nygren)	0	0	0	0	1	1	X	X	2

Draw 4

Monday, January 22, 10:00

Sheet B	1	2	3	4	5	6	7	8	Final
United States (Ponzio)	0	1	0	0	2	0	2	3	8
Japan (Fujii) 🔨	2	0	0	1	0	3	0	0	6

Draw 5

Monday, January 22, 18:00

Sheet C	1	2	3	4	5	6	7	8	Final
Japan (Fujii)	0	0	0	1	4	0	1	X	6
New Zealand (Nevill) 🔨	0	0	1	0	0	1	0	X	2

Draw 6

Tuesday, January 23, 14:00

Sheet A	1	2	3	4	5	6	7	8	Final
Turkey (Zenit)	0	0	0	0	2	0	0	X	2
Japan (Fujii) 🔨	1	3	0	1	0	1	2	X	8

Draw 7

Wednesday, January 24, 9:00

Sheet C	1	2	3	4	5	6	7	8	Final
Norway (Johansen) 🔨	0	1	0	2	0	1	0	X	4
Japan (Fujii)	1	0	1	0	2	0	4	X	8

Qualification Game

Wednesday, January 24, 19:00

Sheet C	1	2	3	4	5	6	7	8	Final
Denmark (Schmidt) 🔨	2	1	1	0	3	0	1	X	8
Japan (Fujii)	0	0	0	1	0	2	0	X	3

=== Mixed doubles ===
Group C	W	L	W–L	DSC
China	5	0	–	56.80
Japan	4	1	–	38.84
Latvia	3	2	–	77.39
Turkey	2	3	–	89.37
New Zealand	1	4	–	94.80
Brazil	0	5	–	112.92

Round robin

Draw 4

Saturday, January 27, 18:00

Sheet A	1	2	3	4	5	6	7	8	Final
China (Gong / Xu)	0	2	1	0	2	2	0	X	7
Japan (Tanaka / Kawai) 🔨	1	0	0	2	0	0	2	X	5

Draw 5

Sunday, January 28, 10:00

Sheet B	1	2	3	4	5	6	7	8	Final
Brazil (Gentile / Melo)	0	0	1	0	0	0	X	X	1
Japan (Tanaka / Kawai) 🔨	3	2	0	2	3	1	X	X	11

Draw 8

Monday, January 29, 10:00

Sheet D	1	2	3	4	5	6	7	8	Final
Turkey (Ekmekçi / Aybar)	0	0	1	1	1	2	0	X	5
Japan (Tanaka / Kawai) 🔨	3	2	0	0	0	0	4	X	9

Draw 12

Tuesday, January 30, 14:00

Sheet D	1	2	3	4	5	6	7	8	Final
Japan (Tanaka / Kawai) 🔨	3	0	1	1	0	4	2	X	11
New Zealand (Russell / Nevill)	0	1	0	0	1	0	0	X	2

Draw 15

Wednesday, January 31, 12:30

Sheet C	1	2	3	4	5	6	7	8	Final
Japan (Tanaka / Kawai)	0	1	1	0	1	0	1	1	5
Latvia (Regža / Zass) 🔨	2	0	0	1	0	1	0	0	4

Quarterfinal

Wednesday, January 31, 19:00

Sheet D	1	2	3	4	5	6	7	8	Final
Denmark (Schmidt / Schmidt)	0	0	4	2	0	0	3	0	9
Japan (Tanaka / Kawai) 🔨	1	1	0	0	3	1	0	1	7

== Figure skating ==
Japan qualified four figure skaters (two per gender).

Athlete	Event	SP/SD		FS/FD		Total	
Athlete	Event	Points	Rank	Points	Rank	Points	Rank
Haru Kakiuchi	Men's singles	61.11	8	124.77	5	185.88	7
Rio Nakata	Men's singles	55.59	13	142.70	2	198.29	5
Mao Shimada	Women's singles	71.05	1	125.94	1	196.99	1st place, gold medalist(s)
Yo Takagi	Women's singles	67.23	2	115.97	5	183.20	3rd place, bronze medalist(s)

== Freestyle skiing ==
Japan qualified ten freestyle skiers (five per gender).

Dual moguls
Individual

Athlete	Event	Group Stage						Semifinals	Final / BM	
Athlete	Event	Opposition Result	Opposition Result	Opposition Result	Opposition Result	Points	Rank	Opposition Result	Opposition Result	Rank
Takuto Nakamura	Men's dual moguls	Hill (AUS); W 3–2	Kim (KOR); W 3–2	Koehler (CAN); L 2–3	Dooley (IRL); W 3–2	11	1 Q	Huff (USA); L 3–32	Cohen (USA); W 19–16	3rd place, bronze medalist(s)
Hikaru Sakai	Women's dual moguls	Kisil (UKR); W 3–2	Joly (FRA); W 3–2	Lodge (AUS); L 2–3	Feklistova (KAZ); W 3–2	11	2	Did not advance		
Rin Taguchi	Women's dual moguls	DNS								

Team

Athlete	Event	Round of 16	Quarterfinals	Semifinals	Final / BM	
Athlete	Event	Opposition Result	Opposition Result	Opposition Result	Opposition Result	Rank
Hikaru Sakai; Takuto Nakamura	Mixed team	Nilsson / Gravenfors (SWE); W 42–28	Lodge / Hill (AUS); W 50–20	Lemley / Huff (USA); L 32–38	McLarnon / Cohen (USA); L 26–44	4

Ski cross
Individual

Athlete	Event	Group heats		Semifinal	Final
Athlete	Event	Points	Rank	Position	Position
Jinichiro Ishinaka	Men's ski cross	16	4 Q	4 SF	8
Ryusei Suzuki	Men's ski cross	10	13	Did not advance	
Koko Kawashima	Women's ski cross	14	7	Did not advance	
Hana Kiyota	Women's ski cross	11	10	Did not advance	

Team

Athlete	Event	Pre-heats	Quarterfinal	Semifinal	Final
Athlete	Event	Position	Position	Position	Position
Jinichiro Ishinaka; Koko Kawashima	Team ski cross	1 Q	4	Did not advance	
Ryusei Suzuki; Hana Kiyora	Team ski cross	3	Did not advance		

Halfpipe, Slopestyle & Big Air

Athlete	Event	Qualification				Final				
Athlete	Event	Run 1	Run 2	Best	Rank	Run 1	Run 2	Run 3	Best	Rank
Olly Nicholls	Men's big air	91.00	42.00	91.00	3 Q	86.00	88.50	28.25	174.50	2nd place, silver medalist(s)
Olly Nicholls	Men's slopestyle	10.50	73.50	73.50	9 Q	71.00	36.50	85.75	85.75	2nd place, silver medalist(s)
Kashu Sato	Men's halfpipe	59.75	56.25	59.75	9 Q	55.00	47.75	53.50	55.00	9
Kiho Sugawara	Women's big air	63.50	67.00	67.00	8 Q	45.00	44.75	42.00	87.00	10
Kiho Sugawara	Women's slopestyle	53.50	50.50	53.50	12	Did not advance				

== Ice hockey ==
Japan qualified a team of eighteen ice hockey players for the women's six-team tournament.

Roster

Haruna Yoneyama served as head coach and Moeko Fujimoto was assistant coach.

- Nana Akimoto
- Suzuno Fukuda
- Momona Fukuzawa
- Yumin Furuhira
- Mayu Hosogoe
- Tsumugi Ito
- Reina Kakuta
- Saika Kiyokawa
- Riko Nishiuchi
- Azumi Numabe
- Umeka Odaira
- Momoka Okamura
- Koko Ruike
- Lily Sato
- Rio Suzuki
- Rino Tada – A
- Kika Terauchi – C
- Nanaho Yamaguchi – A

Summary

Key:

- GWS – Game winning shots

Team	Event	Group stage			Semifinal	Final	
Team	Event	Opponent Score	Opponent Score	Rank	Opponent Score	Opponent Score	Rank
Japan	Women's tournament	Norway; W 5–1	Sweden; L 1–2 GWS	Q	Switzerland; W 2–1	Sweden; L 0–4	2nd place, silver medalist(s)

=== Women's tournament ===
Group A

Pos	Team	Pld	W	SOW	SOL	L	GF	GA	GD	Pts	Qualification
1	Sweden	2	1	1	0	0	7	2	+5	5	Semifinals
2	Japan	2	1	0	1	0	6	3	+3	4	Semifinals
3	Norway	2	0	0	0	2	2	10	−8	0	

Source: IOC

28 January 2024; 11:00	Japan	5–1 (1–0, 0–0, 4–1)	Norway	Gangneung Hockey Centre; Attendance: 2,837

Game reference

Suzuno Fukuda
Goalies
Shiva Nobari
Referees:
(China) Ding Siwen
(Canada) Beatrice Fortin
Linesmen:
(United States) Laura Schmidlein
(Finland) Ilona Silander

Terauchi (Odaira, Numabe) (PP) – 10:47	1–0
Numabe (Odaira, Terauchi) – 30:41	2–0
	2–1	33:25 – Helle, (Klomstad, Bax-Kristiansen) (PP)
Odaira (Numabe, Terauchi) – 36:17	3–1
Numabe (Terauchi, Odaira) – 40:12	4–1
Odaira (Numabe) – 43:04	5–1

6 min
Penalties
6 min
41
Shots
13

29 January 2024; 11:00	Sweden	2–1 GWS (0–0, 0–0, 1–1) (SO: 1–0)	Japan	Gangneung Hockey Centre; Attendance: 1,503

Game reference
Tilde Wyckman	Goalies	Rio Suzuki	Referees: (Mexico) María Chávez (United States) Maria Gherardi; Linesmen: (Germany) Lara Fischer (Finland) Ilona Silander
/ 0–1 / 35:07 – Odaira (Yamaguchi, Numabe); Svanefjord (Österman) – 37:18 / 1–1			Referees: (Mexico) María Chávez (United States) Maria Gherardi; Linesmen: (Germany) Lara Fischer (Finland) Ilona Silander
Österman; Westerlind	Shootout	(miss) Odaira; (miss) Numabe	Referees: (Mexico) María Chávez (United States) Maria Gherardi; Linesmen: (Germany) Lara Fischer (Finland) Ilona Silander
3 min	Penalties	1.5 min	Referees: (Mexico) María Chávez (United States) Maria Gherardi; Linesmen: (Germany) Lara Fischer (Finland) Ilona Silander
21	Shots	18	Referees: (Mexico) María Chávez (United States) Maria Gherardi; Linesmen: (Germany) Lara Fischer (Finland) Ilona Silander

Semifinals

30 January 2024; 17:00	Switzerland	1–2 (1–1, 0–1, 0–0)	Japan	Gangneung Hockey Centre; Attendance: 1,083

Game reference

Valentina Camenzind
Goalies
Suzuno Fukuda
Referees:
(Mexico) María Chávez
(Canada) Beatrice Fortin
Linesmen:
(Ukraine) Anhelina Maifeld
(Switzerland) Domenica Maurer

Müller – 10:06	1–0
	1–1	10:38 – Fukuzawa (Ruike)
	1–2	24:26 – Numabe (Odaira, Tada) (PP)

7.5 min
Penalties
1.5 min
12
Shots
20

Finals

31 January 2024; 16:00	Sweden	4–0 (2–0, 0–0, 2–0)	Japan	Gangneung Hockey Centre; Attendance: 2,880

Game reference

Tilde Wyckman
Goalies
Suzuno Fukuda
Referees:
(Canada) Beatrice Fortin
(United States) Maria Gherardi
Linesmen:
(Ukraine) Anhelina Maifeld
(United States) Laura Schmidlein

Grillfors – 09:02	1–0
Westerlind – 11:06	2–0
Norén (Carlsson, Melin) – 31:00	3–0
Österman (ENG) – 44:26	4–0

6 min
Penalties
0 min
14
Shots
27

== Nordic combined ==
Japan qualified four Nordic combined athletes (two per gender).

Athlete	Event	Ski jumping			Cross-country		Total	
Athlete	Event	Distance	Points	Rank	Time	Rank	Time	Rank
Kohtaro Kubota	Men's normal hill/6 km	93.0	109.1	13	13:31.0	15	15:39.0	13
Ruka Kudo	Men's normal hill/6 km	80.0	78.7	26	14:13.8	24	18:22.8	25
Yuzuka Fujiwara	Women's normal hill/4 km	88.0	89.8	15	9:41.7	1	12:35.7	9
Jui Yamazaki	Women's normal hill/4 km	96.5	106.6	8	10:34.3	10	12:21.3	7
Yuzuka Fujiwara; Kohtaro Kubota; Ruka Kudo; Jui Yamazaki	Mixed team	351.0	354.1	8	34:12.1	3	35:46.1	7

== Short track speed skating ==
Japan qualified four short-track speed skaters (two per gender).

Men

Athlete	Event	Heats		Quarterfinal		Semifinal		Final	
Athlete	Event	Time	Rank	Time	Rank	Time	Rank	Time	Rank
Yuta Fuchigami	500 m	42.738	1 Q	42.078	3 q	57.216	5 FB	42.930	9
Yuta Fuchigami	1000 m	1:29.377	1 Q	1:54.976	5	Did not advance			
Yuta Fuchigami	1500 m	—N/a		2:16.364	2 Q	2:57.832	7	Did not advance	
Raito Kida	500 m	42.479	1 Q	42.490	3	Did not advance			
Raito Kida	1000 m	1:32.515	2 Q	1:29.852	2 Q	1:26.061	2 FA	1:26.478	3rd place, bronze medalist(s)
Raito Kida	1500 m	—N/a		2:31.283	3 Q	2:22.103	3 FA	2:23.299	6

Women

Athlete	Event	Heats		Quarterfinal		Semifinal		Final	
Athlete	Event	Time	Rank	Time	Rank	Time	Rank	Time	Rank
Nonomi Inoue	500 m	46.250	3 q	45.557	5	Did not advance			
Nonomi Inoue	1000 m	1:36.646	1 Q	1:33.523	5	Did not advance			
Nonomi Inoue	1500 m	—N/a		2:38.688	1 Q	2:26.311	2 FA	2:42.293	3rd place, bronze medalist(s)
Aoi Yoshizawa	500 m	45.320	2 Q	44.554	3 q	44.935	4 FB	46.137	9
Aoi Yoshizawa	1000 m	1:37.171	2 Q	1:33.904	4	Did not advance			
Aoi Yoshizawa	1500 m	—N/a		2:28.337	1 Q	2:27.287	4 FB	2:44.661	10

Mixed

Athlete	Event	Semifinal		Final	
Athlete	Event	Time	Rank	Time	Rank
Yuta Fuchigami; Nonomi Inoue; Raito Kida; Aoi Yoshizawa	Mixed relay	2:46.957	1 FA	2:47.412	3rd place, bronze medalist(s)

== Skeleton ==
Japan qualified one skeleton racer.

Athlete	Event	Run 1		Run 2		Total	
Athlete	Event	Time	Rank	Time	Rank	Time	Rank
Mio Shinohara	Women's	57.36	13	57.67	14	1:55.03	13

== Ski jumping ==
Japan qualified four ski jumpers (two per gender).

Athlete	Event	First round			Final			Total	
Athlete	Event	Distance	Points	Rank	Distance	Points	Rank	Points	Rank
Takuma Mikami	Men's normal hill	82.5	65.0	27	85.0	67.9	24	132.9	26
Seigo Sasaki	Men's normal hill	88.5	76.8	21	82.5	60.9	27	137.7	24
Hana Sakurai	Women's normal hill	78.5	53.3	19	77.0	50.0	21	103.3	20
Yuzuki Sato	Women's normal hill	92.5	83.1	8	101.5	103.1	3	186.2	6
Hana Sakurai; Takuma Mikami; Yuzuki Sato; Seigo Sasaki	Mixed team	346.5	304.8	9	341.0	307.0	9	611.8	9

== Snowboarding ==
Japan qualified eight snowboarders (three men and five women).

Snowboard cross
Individual

Athlete	Event	Group stage		Semifinal	Final
Athlete	Event	Points	Rank	Position	Position
Daisuke Muraoka	Men's snowboard cross	17	4 Q	4 SF	7
Rio Ishida	Women's snowboard cross	15	7	Did not advance	

Mixed

Athlete	Event	Pre-heats	Quarterfinal	Semifinal	Final
Athlete	Event	Position	Position	Position	Position
Daisuke Muraoka; Rio Ishida	Team snowboard cross	—N/a	2 Q	4 SF	7

Halfpipe, Slopestyle & Big Air

Athlete	Event	Qualification				Final				
Athlete	Event	Run 1	Run 2	Best	Rank	Run 1	Run 2	Run 3	Best	Rank
Kyu Shimasaki	Men's halfpipe	69.75	64.25	69.75	7 Q	13.00	43.50	57.25	57.25	9
Ryusei Yamada	Men's halfpipe	81.75	85.75	85.75	2 Q	42.00	83.00	14.00	83.00	3rd place, bronze medalist(s)
Rise Kudo	Women's halfpipe	92.25	91.25	92.25	1 Q	90.75	73.25	68.25	90.75	1st place, gold medalist(s)
Kiara Morii	Women's big air	84.25	25.50	84.25	4 Q	78.75	72.50	21.50	151.25	4
Kiara Morii	Women's slopestyle	25.75	20.50	25.75	17	Did not advance				
Yura Murase	Women's big air	82.00	33.25	82.00	6 Q	66.00	79.50	74.75	154.25	1st place, gold medalist(s)
Yura Murase	Women's slopestyle	49.50	93.00	93.00	1 Q	24.00	10.00	79.25	79.25	5
Sara Shimizu	Women's halfpipe	83.75	89.00	89.00	2 Q	84.50	19.50	63.00	84.50	2nd place, silver medalist(s)

== Speed skating ==
Japan qualified four speed skaters (two per gender).

Men

Athlete	Event	Time	Rank
Sota Kubo	500 m	37.20	4
Sota Kubo	1500 m	1:53.16	3rd place, bronze medalist(s)
Takumi Murashita	500 m	37.23	5
Takumi Murashita	1500 m	1:54.30	5

Women

Athlete	Event	Time	Rank
Kaede Kojima	500 m	41.06	9
Kaede Kojima	1500 m	2:05.71	4
Waka Sasabuchi	500 m	39.65	3rd place, bronze medalist(s)
Waka Sasabuchi	1500 m	2:14.59	20

Mass Start

Athlete	Event	Semifinal			Final		
Athlete	Event	Points	Time	Rank	Points	Time	Rank
Sota Kubo	Men's mass start	DQ			Did not advance		
Takuma Murashita	Men's mass start	2	5:31.93	6 Q	4	5:30.92	4
Kaede Kojima	Women's mass start	10	5:59.16	3 Q	0	5:56.43	11
Waka Sasabuchi	Women's mass start	4	6:25.910	5 Q	0	5:56.41	10

Mixed relay

Athlete	Event	Semifinal		Final	
Athlete	Event	Time	Rank	Time	Rank
Kaede Kojima; Sota Kubo	Mixed relay	3:09.73	4 Q	3:15.61	4

== See also ==
- Japan at the 2024 Summer Olympics
