= Bulgaria at the 2024 Winter Youth Olympics =

- Flag of Bulgaria
- IOC code: BUL
- NOC: Bulgarian Olympic Committee

in Gangwon, South Korea 19 January 2024 – 1 February 2024
- Competitors: 15 in 6 sports
- Flag bearer (opening): Ivan Ivanov & Andreya Kotsinova
- Flag bearer (closing): TBD
- Medals: Gold 0 Silver 0 Bronze 0 Total 0

Winter Youth Olympics appearances (overview)
- 2012; 2016; 2020; 2024

Bulgaria is scheduled to compete at the 2024 Winter Youth Olympics in Gangwon, South Korea, from January 19 to February 1, 2024. This will be Bulgaria's fourth appearance at the Winter Youth Olympic Games, having competed at every Games since the inaugural edition in 2012.

Snowboarders Ivan Ivanov and Andra Kotsinova were the country's flagbearers during the opening ceremony.

== Competitors ==
The following is the list of number of competitors (per gender) participating at the games per sport/discipline.

Sport	Men	Women	Total
Alpine skiing	1	0	1
Biathlon	3	3	6
Cross-country skiing	1	1	2
Luge	1	0	1
Short track speed skating	2	1	3
Snowboarding	1	1	2
Total	9	6	15

== Alpine skiing ==
Bulgaria qualified one male alpine skier.

Men

Athlete	Event	Run 1		Run 2		Total	
Athlete	Event	Time	Rank	Time	Rank	Time	Rank
Atanas Petrov	Super-G	—				Did not start	
Atanas Petrov	Giant slalom	51.72	27	46.43	12	1:38.15	18
Atanas Petrov	Slalom	Did not finish					

== Biathlon ==
Men

Athlete	Event	Time	Misses	Rank
Veselin Belchinski	Sprint	23:09.1	2 (1+1)	15
Veselin Belchinski	Individual	47:31.4	6 (2+2+1+1)	32
Georgi Dzhorgov	Sprint	22:10.8	1 (0+1)	5
Georgi Dzhorgov	Individual	43:42.6	3 (1+1+1+0)	4
Nikolay Nikolov	Sprint	22:40.9	2 (2+0)	10
Nikolay Nikolov	Individual	48:32.2	9 (3+4+1+1)	46

Women

Athlete	Event	Time	Misses	Rank
Raya Adzhamova	Sprint	26:13.0	8 (4+4)	67
Raya Adzhamova	Individual	41:04.6	3 (0+0+1+2)	19
Irina Georgieva	Sprint	23:13.7	3 (2+1)	35
Irina Georgieva	Individual	43:59.3	6 (2+2+1+1)	44
Nikol Klenovska	Sprint	24:56.0	4 (2+2)	55
Nikol Klenovska	Individual	43:41.7	4 (0+1+1+2)	37

Mixed

Athletes	Event	Time	Misses	Rank
Raya Adzhamova; Georgi Dzhorgov	Single mixed relay	48:40.9	1+13	13
Irina Georgieva; Raya Adzhamova; Veselin Belchinski; Georgi Dzhorgov	Mixed relay	1:26:19.3	6+23	14

== Cross-country skiing ==
Bulgaria qualified two cross-country skiers (one per gender).

Men

Athlete	Event	Qualification		Quarterfinal		Semifinal		Final	
Athlete	Event	Time	Rank	Time	Rank	Time	Rank	Time	Rank
Dani Cholakov	7.5 km classical	—						23:48.0	55
Dani Cholakov	Sprint freestyle	3:28.37	53	Did not advance					

Women

Athlete	Event	Qualification		Quarterfinal		Semifinal		Final	
Athlete	Event	Time	Rank	Time	Rank	Time	Rank	Time	Rank
Elena Hristeva	7.5 km classical	—						27:21.9	51
Elena Hristeva	Sprint freestyle	4:12.73	55	Did not advance					

== Luge ==
Bulgaria qualified one male luger.

Men

Athlete	Event	Run 1		Run 2		Total	
Athlete	Event	Time	Rank	Time	Rank	Time	Rank
Angel Stefanov	Singles	49.277	20	49.677	22	1:38.954	21

== Short track speed skating ==
Men

Athlete	Event	Heats		Quarterfinal		Semifinal		Final	
Athlete	Event	Time	Rank	Time	Rank	Time	Rank	Time	Rank
Asen Gyurov	500 m	58.702	4	Did not advance					
Asen Gyurov	1000 m	1:38.550	2 Q	1:31.051	4	Did not advance			
Asen Gyurov	1500 m	—		2:23.571	5	Did not advance			
Nikolas Toskov	500 m	47.982	3	Did not advance					
Nikolas Toskov	1000 m	1:38.221	4	Did not advance					
Nikolas Toskov	1500 m	—		2:39.240	6	Did not advance			

Women

Athlete	Event	Heats		Quarterfinal		Semifinal		Final	
Athlete	Event	Time	Rank	Time	Rank	Time	Rank	Time	Rank
Sonya Stoyanova	500 m	1:07.821	4	Did not advance					
Sonya Stoyanova	1000 m	1:56.596	3	Did not advance					
Sonya Stoyanova	1500 m	—		2:42.443	5	Did not advance			

== Snowboarding ==
Snowboard cross

Athlete	Event	Group stage		Semifinal	Final
Athlete	Event	Points	Rank	Position	Position
Ivan Ivanov	Men's snowboard cross	14	7	Did not advance	
Andrea Kotsinova	Women's snowboard cross	18	2 Q	3 SF	8

Mixed

Athlete	Event	Pre-heats	Quarterfinal	Semifinal	Final
Athlete	Event	Position	Position	Position	Position
Ivan Ivanov; Andrea Kotsinova	Team snowboard cross	3	Did not advance		

== See also ==
- Bulgaria at the 2024 Summer Olympics
