= Brazil at the 2024 Winter Youth Olympics =

- Flag of Brazil
- IOC code: BRA
- NOC: Brazilian Olympic Committee

in Gangwon, South Korea 19 January 2024 – 1 February 2024
- Competitors: 18 in 7 sports
- Flag bearers (opening): André Luiz da Silva & Alice Padilha
- Flag bearer (closing): TBD
- Medals Ranked 30th: Gold 0 Silver 0 Bronze 1 Total 1

Winter Youth Olympics appearances (overview)
- 2012; 2016; 2020; 2024

Brazil competed at the 2024 Winter Youth Olympics in Gangwon, South Korea, from 19 January to 1 February 2024. This was Brazil's fourth appearance at the Winter Youth Olympic Games, having competed at every Games since the inaugural edition in 2012.

Bobsledder André Luiz da Silva and alpine skier Alice Padilha were the country's flagbearers during the opening ceremony.

Zion Bethônico became the first athlete from Brazil to win a Winter Youth Olympics (or Winter Olympics) medal. On 20 January, Bethônico won the bronze medal in the men's snowboard cross event.

== Medalists ==
Medal	Name	Sport	Event	Date
Bronze	Zion Bethônico	Snowboarding	Men's snowboard cross	20 January

== Alpine skiing ==
Men

Athlete	Event	Run 1		Run 2		Total	
Athlete	Event	Time	Rank	Time	Rank	Time	Rank
Arthur Padilha
Arthur Padilha	Giant slalom	58.54	55	52.45	40	1:50.99	40
Arthur Padilha	Slalom	DSQ					

Women

Athlete	Event	Run 1		Run 2		Total	
Athlete	Event	Time	Rank	Time	Rank	Time	Rank
Alice Padilha
Alice Padilha	Giant slalom	DNF					
Alice Padilha	Slalom	DNF					

== Biathlon ==
Women

Athlete	Event	Time	Misses	Rank
Mariana Lopes da Silva	Sprint	34:37.0	6 (3+3)	89
Mariana Lopes da Silva	Individual	22:40.4	8 (2+2+2+2)	93

== Bobsleigh ==
Athlete	Event	Run 1		Run 2		Total	
Athlete	Event	Time	Rank	Time	Rank	Time	Rank
André Luiz da Silva	Men's	56.50	16	56.86	18	1:53.36	17
Luís Felipe Seixas	Men's	55.58	11	56.14	11	1:51.72	10

== Cross-country skiing ==
Men

Athlete	Event	Qualification		Quarterfinal		Semifinal		Final	
Athlete	Event	Time	Rank	Time	Rank	Time	Rank	Time	Rank
Gabriel Santos	7.5 km classic	—N/a						26:57.9	73
Ian Francisco da Silva	7.5 km classic	—N/a						27:51.6	74
Gabriel Santos	Sprint freestyle	3:44.98	70	Did not advance					
Ian Francisco da Silva	Sprint freestyle	3:59.56	75	Did not advance					

Women

Athlete	Event	Qualification		Quarterfinal		Semifinal		Final	
Athlete	Event	Time	Rank	Time	Rank	Time	Rank	Time	Rank
Júlia Reis	7.5 km classic	—N/a						31:14.5	64
Mariana Lopes da Silva	7.5 km classic	—N/a						37:14.3	71
Júlia Reis	Sprint freestyle	4:42.16	69	Did not advance					
Mariana Lopes da Silva	Sprint freestyle	4:56.07	72	Did not advance					

== Curling ==
Brazil qualified a mixed team and a mixed doubles team, by finishing in the top American teams at the 2022–23 World Junior Curling Championships.

Summary

Team	Event	Group Stage								Quarterfinal	Semifinal	Final / BM	
Team	Event	Opposition Score	Opposition Score	Opposition Score	Opposition Score	Opposition Score	Opposition Score	Opposition Score	Rank	Opposition Score	Opposition Score	Opposition Score	Rank
Pedro Ribeiro; Guilherme Melo; Julia Gentile; Rafaela Ladeira	Mixed team	South Korea; L 1–17	Canada; L 0–14	Denmark; L 1–14	Germany; W 6–4	Switzerland; L 2–13	Italy; L 3–10	Great Britain; L 4–9	7	Did not advance			14
Júlia Gentile; Guilherme Melo	Mixed doubles	New Zealand; L 5–12	Japan; L 1–11	China; L 3–10	Latvia; L 3–6	Turkey; L 5–10	—N/a		6	Did not advance			22

=== Mixed team ===
Group B	Skip	W	L	W–L	PF	PA	EW	EL	BE	SE	DSC
Great Britain	Logan Carson	6	1	–	44	30	26	21	4	7	51.75
Denmark	Jacob Schmidt	5	2	–	48	28	27	20	2	9	34.70
Switzerland	Nathan Dryburgh	4	3	2–0	52	35	25	23	5	7	39.96
Italy	Andrea Gilli	4	3	1–1	46	38	29	23	3	7	50.58
South Korea	Kim Dae-hyun	4	3	0–2	48	33	24	22	3	8	109.88
Canada	Nathan Gray	3	4	–	40	34	24	20	3	11	35.43
Brazil	Pedro Ribeiro	1	6	1–0	17	81	13	31	0	2	103.39
Germany	Lukas Jäger	1	6	0–1	30	46	19	27	2	5	68.51

Round robin

Draw 1

Saturday, January 20, 14:00

Sheet A	1	2	3	4	5	6	7	8	Final
Brazil (Ribeiro)	0	0	0	0	0	1	X	X	1
South Korea (Kim) 🔨	6	1	3	6	1	0	X	X	17

Draw 2

Sunday, January 21, 10:00

Sheet C	1	2	3	4	5	6	7	8	Final
Canada (Gray)	1	1	2	3	4	3	X	X	14
Brazil (Ribeiro) 🔨	0	0	0	0	0	0	X	X	0

Draw 3

Sunday, January 21, 18:00

Sheet D	1	2	3	4	5	6	7	8	Final
Brazil (Ribeiro)	0	0	0	0	1	0	X	X	1
Denmark (Schmidt) 🔨	3	3	2	2	0	4	X	X	14

Draw 4

Monday, January 22, 14:00

Sheet B	1	2	3	4	5	6	7	8	Final
Brazil (Ribeiro)	0	0	1	1	0	2	0	2	6
Germany (Jäger) 🔨	1	1	0	0	1	0	1	0	4

Draw 5

Tuesday, January 23, 10:00

Sheet D	1	2	3	4	5	6	7	8	Final
Switzerland (Dryburgh) 🔨	4	0	0	4	4	1	X	X	13
Brazil (Ribeiro)	0	1	1	0	0	0	X	X	2

Draw 6

Tuesday, January 23, 18:00

Sheet C	1	2	3	4	5	6	7	8	Final
Brazil (Ribeiro)	0	1	0	0	0	2	X	X	3
Italy (Gilli) 🔨	4	0	0	4	2	0	X	X	10

Draw 7

Wednesday, January 24, 13:00

Sheet A	1	2	3	4	5	6	7	8	Final
Great Britain (Carson) 🔨	1	0	3	1	0	4	0	X	9
Brazil (Ribeiro)	0	1	0	0	1	0	2	X	4

=== Mixed doubles ===
Group C	W	L	W–L	DSC
China	5	0	–	56.80
Japan	4	1	–	38.84
Latvia	3	2	–	77.39
Turkey	2	3	–	89.37
New Zealand	1	4	–	94.80
Brazil	0	5	–	112.92

Round robin

Draw 4

Saturday, January 27, 18:00

Sheet C	1	2	3	4	5	6	7	8	Final
New Zealand (Russell / Nevill) 🔨	2	3	1	0	2	0	4	X	12
Brazil (Gentile / Melo)	0	0	0	1	0	4	0	X	5

Draw 5

Sunday, January 28, 10:00

Sheet B	1	2	3	4	5	6	7	8	Final
Brazil (Gentile / Melo)	0	0	1	0	0	0	X	X	1
Japan (Tanaka / Kawai) 🔨	3	2	0	2	3	1	X	X	11

Draw 10

Monday, January 29, 18:00

Sheet D	1	2	3	4	5	6	7	8	Final
Brazil (Gentile / Melo) 🔨	2	0	0	0	0	1	0	X	3
China (Gong / Xu)	0	2	2	2	1	0	3	X	10

Draw 13

Tuesday, January 30, 18:00

Sheet A	1	2	3	4	5	6	7	8	Final
Latvia (Regža / Zass) 🔨	2	2	0	0	1	1	0	X	6
Brazil (Gentile / Melo)	0	0	1	1	0	0	1	X	3

Draw 15

Wednesday, January 31, 12:30

Sheet A	1	2	3	4	5	6	7	8	Final
Brazil (Gentile / Melo)	0	1	1	0	2	1	0	X	5
Turkey (Ekmekçi / Aybar) 🔨	3	0	0	3	0	0	4	X	10

== Short track speed skating ==
Brazil achieved 1 male quota at the 2023 World Junior Short Track Speed Skating Championships.

Men

Athlete	Event	Heats		Quarterfinal		Semifinal		Final	
Athlete	Event	Time	Rank	Time	Rank	Time	Rank	Time	Rank
Lucas Koo	500 m	42.849	2 Q	41.393	2 Q	42.257	3 QB	1:10.346	10
Lucas Koo	1000 m	—N/a		1:27.554	2 Q	No time	5 QB	PEN	9
Lucas Koo	1500 m	—N/a		2:22.842	2 Q	PEN		Did not advance	

== Skeleton ==
Athlete	Event	Run 1		Run 2		Total	
Athlete	Event	Time	Rank	Time	Rank	Time	Rank
Cauê Miota	Men's	57.21	19	57.10	19	1:54.31	19
Eduardo Strapasson	Men's	55.00	11	54.94	11	1:49.94	10

== Snowboarding ==
Snowboard cross

Athlete	Event	Group heats		Semifinal	Final
Athlete	Event	Points	Rank	Position	Position
Zion Bethônico	Men's snowboard cross	18	3 Q	2 BF	3rd place, bronze medalist(s)

Halfpipe, Slopestyle & Big Air

Athlete	Event	Qualification				Final				
Athlete	Event	Run 1	Run 2	Best	Rank	Run 1	Run 2	Run 3	Best	Rank
João Teixeira	Men's halfpipe	35.25	12.75	35.25	15	did not advance				

== See also ==
- Brazil at the 2024 Summer Olympics
