= Sean Shuai =

American short track speed skater

Personal information
- Born: November 20, 2006 (age 19) Tulsa, Oklahoma, U.S.

Sport
- Country: United States
- Sport: Short track speed skating
Medal record
Men's short-track speed skating
Representing the United States
Youth Olympic Games
Gold medal – first place	2024 Gangwon	500 m
Silver medal – second place	2024 Gangwon	Mixed relay
World Junior Championships
Gold medal – first place	2026 Salt Lake City	500 m
Silver medal – second place	2024 Gdańsk	500 m
Bronze medal – third place	2026 Salt Lake City	3000 m relay

Sean Shuai (born November 20, 2006) is an American short track speed skater.

== Career ==
Internationally, Sean is known for his specialty in the 500m. Sean made history at the 2024 Winter Youth Olympics by becoming the first American to earn a gold in the 500 meter event at the Youth Olympics in an individual discipline. The following race day, he won a silver medal in the mixed 2000m relay event. At the junior level, he competed at the 2024 World Junior Short Track Speed Skating Championships and won a silver medal in the 500 meter event. At the 2026 Junior World Championships in Salt Lake City, he became the 500m Junior World Champion.

== Life and Hobbies ==
Sean enjoys cars, coaching, and running in his free time. He currently attends Columbia University in New York City.

== World Tour medal record ==
Season	Location	Mixed relay
2024–2025	(Netherlands) Tilburg	3rd place, bronze medalist(s)
