= Peter Groseclose =

Filipino speed skater

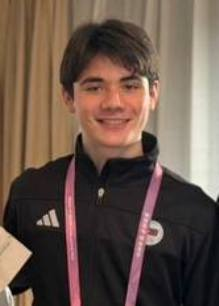
- Groseclose in 2025

Personal information
- Full name: Peter Joseph De Guzman Groseclose
- Born: March 3, 2007 (age 19) Los Angeles, California, U.S.

Sport
- Country: Philippines
- Sport: Short track speed skating
- Club: Potomac
- Coached by: Simon Cho; John-Henry Krueger

Achievements and titles
- Personal best: 500 m: 41.188 (2023)
Medal record
Men's short track speed skating
Representing Philippines
SEA Games
Gold medal – first place	2025 Thailand	500m
Silver medal – second place	2025 Thailand	1,500m
Bronze medal – third place	2025 Thailand	Men's Open Relay 5000m

Peter Joseph De Guzman Groseclose (born March 3, 2007) is a Filipino short track speedskater. He is the 2025 SEA Games 500m gold medalist.

== Early life and education ==
Peter Joseph De Guzman Groseclose was born on March 3, 2007, in Tarzana, Los Angeles. He is Filipino through his mother, Victoria De Guzman from San Juan City, Philippines. He attended Oakton High School.

== Career ==
Groseclose took up short track speed skating at age 7 in Lakewood, California. He was coached by American champions Simon Cho and John-Henry Krueger. He is affiliated with the Potomac Speedskating Club.

Groseclose took part in the 2024 Winter Youth Olympics in Gangwon, South Korea. At the men's 500-meter event he finished first in all of his races leading to the Final A. He finished fifth overall despite an injury cut mid-race. This was the best performance of a Filipino athlete at the Winter Youth Olympics surpassing figure skater Michael Christian Martinez seventh place record in the 2012 edition.

He placed third at the 500m event of the 2024 ISU Junior World Cup 2 in Bormio, Italy marking the first time a representative for the Philippines medaled ISU World Cup tournament.

He made his first-ever SEA Games appearance at the 2025 edition in Thailand where he won gold in the 500m and silver in the 1,500m.
