= Gangneung Ice Arena =

Sports venue in Gangneung, South Korea

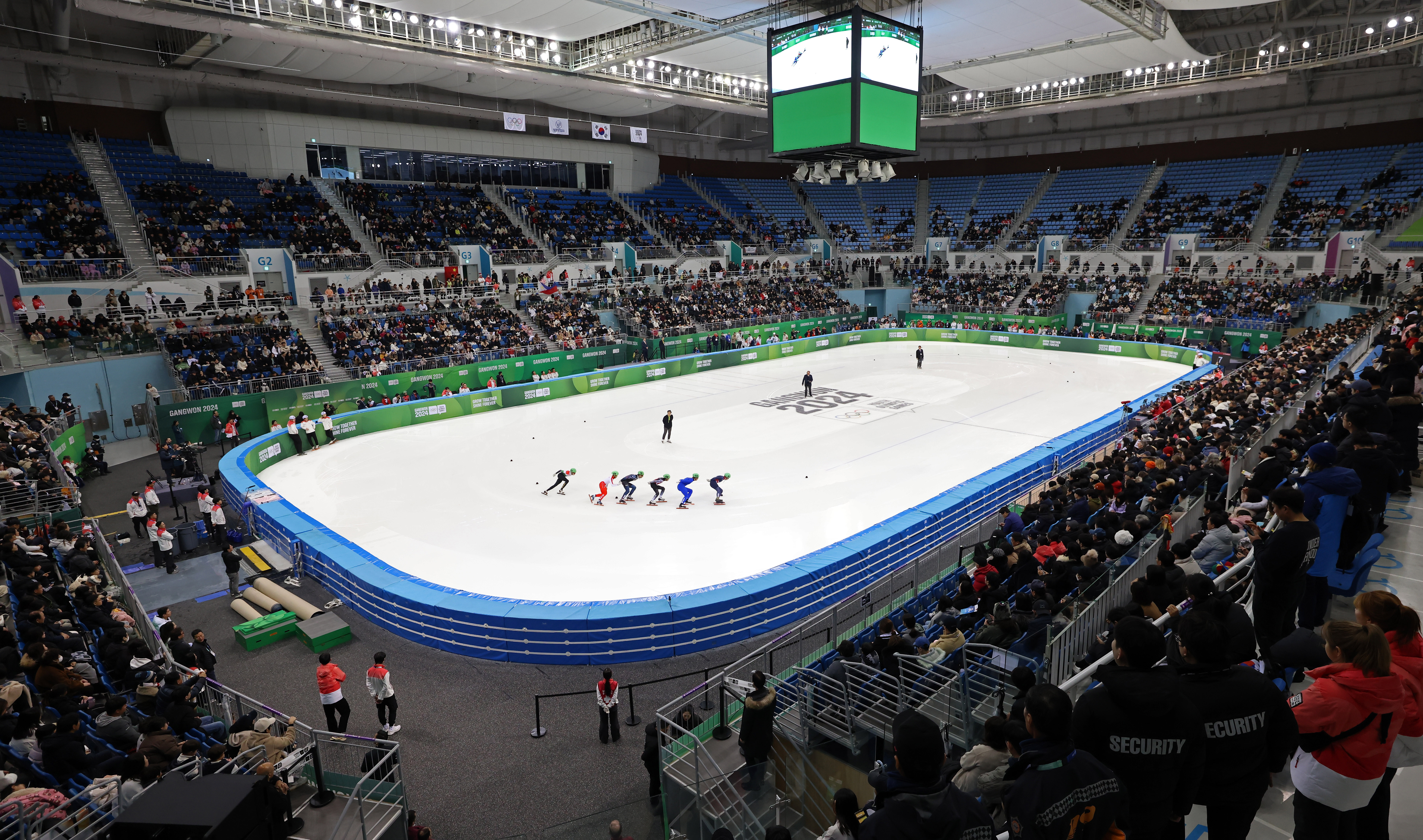
- Interactive map of Gangneung Ice Arena
- Location: Gangneung, South Korea
- Coordinates: 37°46′46″N 128°53′50″E
- Capacity: 12,000

Construction
- Opened: 14 December 2016; 9 years ago
- Cost: US$85 million

Gangneung Ice Arena (Korean: 강릉 아이스 아레나) is an indoor ice arena, built for the 2018 Winter Olympics. It is located in the coastal city of Gangneung. It was the venue for two sports: figure skating and short track speed skating.

The seating capacity is 12,000. The Gangneung Ice Arena is designed to house two ice rinks (60 m × 30 m [197 ft × 98 ft]), one for competition and one for training. The building has four floors aboveground and two underground levels. An environmentally-friendly ice cooling system was adopted, and the facility is used for local recreational purposes since the Games.

The cost of construction was US$85 million and the facility was inaugurated on 14 December 2016.

== See also ==
- List of indoor arenas in South Korea
