= 2024 Winter Youth Olympics =

Multi-sport event in Gangwon Province, South Korea

IV Winter Youth Olympic Games
- Emblem of the 2024 Winter Youth Olympics
- Location: Gangwon Province, South Korea
- Motto: Grow Together, Shine Forever (Korean: 함께할 때 빛나는 우리, Hamkkehal Ttae Bichnaneun Uli)
- Nations: 78
- Athletes: 1,803
- Events: 81 events in 7 sports (15 disciplines)
- Opening: 19 January 2024
- Closing: 1 February 2024
- Opened by: President Yoon Suk Yeol
- Closed by: IOC president Thomas Bach
- Cauldron: Lee Jeong-min
- Stadium: Gangneung Oval and Yongpyong Dome (opening ceremony); Gangwon Olympic Stage (closing ceremony)

The 2024 Winter Youth Olympics (Korean: 2024년 동계 청소년 올림픽), officially known as the IV Winter Youth Olympic Games and commonly known as Gangwon 2024 (강원 2024), were a winter multi-sport event, cultural festival, and fourth edition of the Winter Youth Olympics held between 19 January and 1 February 2024 in Gangwon Province, South Korea.

That was the third time South Korea hosted the Olympic Games, after the 1988 Summer Olympics in Seoul and the 2018 Winter Olympics in Pyeongchang, and the second time the country hosted the Winter games, after the 2018 Olympics. It was also the first Winter Youth Olympics held in Asia, as well as the third overall Youth Olympic Games in the continent, after the 2010 Olympics in Singapore and the 2014 Olympics in Nanjing, China (all Summer Games). It was also the final Youth Olympic Games under the IOC presidency of Thomas Bach.

== Bidding process ==
The IOC's Future Host Commission named Gangwon as its preferred candidate for the Games and entered into targeted dialogue with the region under the new Olympic bid process. Brașov, Romania; Granada, Spain; and Sofia, Bulgaria were the other interested parties. They took part in the continuous dialogue with the IOC and the Future Host Commission. Gangwon was officially awarded the Games at the 135th IOC Session in Lausanne, Switzerland, on 10 January 2020; all of the requirements were fulfilled to the satisfaction of the commission and the executive board. The events will be shared between Gangneung and Pyeongchang County, which previously hosted the 2018 Winter Olympics. They were the first Winter Youth Olympics held outside of Europe.

2024 Youth Olympic Games bidding results
Party	Nation	Votes
Gangwon	South Korea	79
None of bid		2
Absentation		1
Total		82

== Development and preparation ==
=== Venues ===
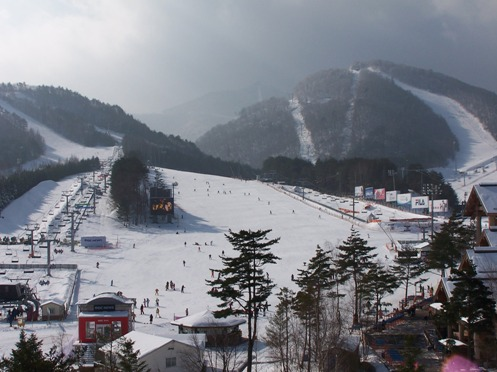
Dragon Valley (Alpensia) Ski Resort

Much of the venues of the 2018 Winter Olympics were used again; the snow events were held in the county of Pyeongchang, while the ice events were held in Gangneung.

If the circumstances were allowed, which they weren't, the city of Wonsan, North Korea would have been involved, and could have been the host of some alpine events.

==== Pyeongchang (mountain cluster) ====
The Alpensia Sports Park in Daegwallyeong-myeon, Pyeongchang, was the main focus of the games, like in 2018.

- Yongpyong Dome – opening ceremony
- Alpensia Ski Jumping Centre – ski jumping, Nordic combined
- Alpensia Biathlon Centre – biathlon, cross-country skiing, Nordic combined
- Alpensia Sliding Centre – luge, bobsleigh, skeleton

Additionally, a stand-alone venue was located in Hoengseong:

- Welli Hilli Park – freestyle skiing (slopestyle, halfpipe, Big Air, skicross), snowboarding

Another stand-alone outdoor sports venue was located in neighboring Jeongseon County:

- High1 Resort – alpine skiing, freestyle skiing (moguls), Youth Olympic Village

==== Gangneung (coastal cluster) ====
The Gangneung Olympic Park, in the neighborhood of Gyo-dong in Gangneung hosted the four indoor sports venues and the closing ceremony. This complex hosts the indoor venues build for the 2018 Winter Olympics and was used again:

- Gangneung Hockey Centre – ice hockey, closing ceremony
- Gangneung Curling Centre – curling
- Gangneung Oval – speed skating, opening ceremony
- Gangneung Ice Arena – short track speed skating, figure skating
- Gangneung–Wonju National University – Olympic Village

== The Games ==
=== Sports ===
For the first time in the history of any type of Olympic Games event, the gender parity rule was used. This means that the same number of events in the Olympic program were the same for men and women (34). The program for this edition featured 7 sports and 15 disciplines in a total of 81 events. The International Olympic Committee had decided in 2021, that for the first time, there would be no mixed NOCs events. The sporting program also received changes as mixed-gender relays were added in cross-country skiing and Nordic combined. Two 1,500m individual events in short-track speed skating were held for the first time. However, the number of events at the cross-country skiing were dropped from 7 to 5.

- Alpine skiing (9)
- Biathlon (6)
- Bobsleigh (2)
- Cross-country skiing (5)
- Curling (2)
- Figure skating (5)
- Freestyle skiing (12)
- Ice hockey (4)
- Luge (5)
- Nordic combined (3)
- Short track speed skating (7)
- Skeleton (2)
- Ski jumping (3)
- Snowboarding (9)
- Speed skating (7)

=== Participating National Olympic Committees ===
A total of 1,803 athletes from a total of 78 NOCs were expected to compete. Five nations made their Winter Youth Olympics debut: Algeria, Nigeria, Puerto Rico, Tunisia and the United Arab Emirates, with the latter two making their first ever Winter Olympic appearance. Albania was scheduled to be the 79th NOC to compete, but its only athlete withdrew from the competition.

Participating National Olympic Committees
- Algeria (1)
- Andorra (1)
- Argentina (7)
- Armenia (3)
- Australia (47)
- Austria (61)
- Belgium (2)
- Bosnia and Herzegovina (6)
- Brazil (17)
- Bulgaria (15)
- Canada (79)
- Chile (12)
- China (55)
- Colombia (5)
- Croatia (9)
- Cyprus (3)
- Czech Republic (62)
- Denmark (21)
- Estonia (24)
- Finland (51)
- France (65)
- Georgia (6)
- Germany (90)
- Great Britain (39)
- Greece (14)
- Hong Kong (3)
- Hungary (33)
- Iceland (7)
- India (1)
- Iran (5)
- Ireland (4)
- Israel (1)
- Italy (74)
- Jamaica (3)
- Japan (69)
- Kazakhstan (41)
- Kenya (2)
- Kosovo (2)
- Kyrgyzstan (3)
- Latvia (45)
- Lebanon (5)
- Liechtenstein (2)
- Lithuania (13)
- Mexico (13)
- Moldova (5)
- Monaco (1)
- Mongolia (12)
- Montenegro (2)
- Nepal (2)
- Netherlands (27)
- New Zealand (22)
- Nigeria (6)
- North Macedonia (4)
- Norway (48)
- Philippines (3)
- Poland (48)
- Portugal (6)
- Puerto Rico (1)
- Qatar (2)
- Romania (33)
- San Marino (1)
- Serbia (7)
- Singapore (2)
- Slovakia (49)
- Slovenia (29)
- South Africa (1)
- South Korea (102) (host)
- Spain (29)
- Sweden (53)
- Switzerland (71)
- Chinese Taipei (19)
- Thailand (20)
- Tunisia (3)
- Turkey (24)
- Ukraine (44)
- United Arab Emirates (2)
- United States (101)
- Uzbekistan (2)

=== Schedule ===
All dates are KST (UTC+9)

OC	Opening ceremony	●	Event competitions	1	Event finals	EG	Exhibition Gala	CC	Closing ceremony

January/February	19 Fri	20 Sat	21 Sun	22 Mon	23 Tue	24 Wed	25 Thu	26 Fri	27 Sat	28 Sun	29 Mon	30 Tue	31 Wed	1 Thu	Events
Ceremonies	OC													CC	
Alpine skiing			2	2	1	1	2	1							9
Biathlon		2	1		2	1									6
Bobsleigh				1	1										2
Cross-country skiing											2	2		1	5
Curling		●	●	●	●	●	1	●	●	●	●	●	●	1	2
Figure skating									●	●	2	2		1	5
Freestyle skiing					2	2	1	1	2	2			2		12
Ice hockey		●	●	●	●	●	2		●	●	●	●	2		4
Luge		2	2		1										5
Nordic combined											2		1		3
Short track speed skating		2	2	2		1									7
Skeleton				1	1										2
Ski jumping		2	1												3
Snowboarding		2	1			1	1		●	2				2	9
Speed skating				2	2		1	2							7
Total events	0	10	9	8	10	6	8	4	2	4	6	4	5	5	81
Cumulative total	0	10	19	27	37	43	51	55	57	61	67	71	76	81	81
January/February	19 Fri	20 Sat	21 Sun	22 Mon	23 Tue	24 Wed	25 Thu	26 Fri	27 Sat	28 Sun	29 Mon	30 Tue	31 Wed	1 Thu	Events

=== Opening ceremony ===
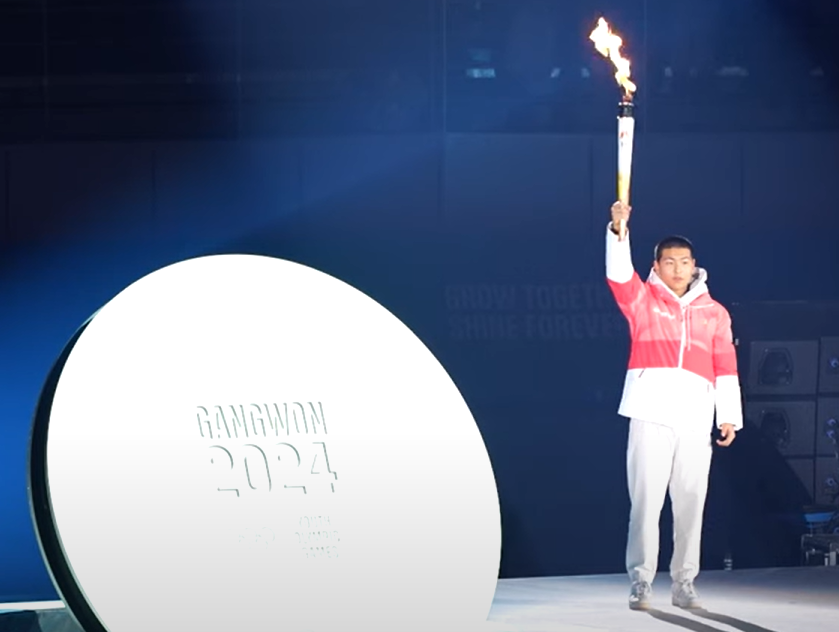
The Olympic torch at the opening ceremony

The opening ceremony of the 2024 Winter Youth Olympic Games took place on 19 January 2024 at the Gangneung Oval in Gangneung, and the Yongpyong Dome in Pyeongchang. This was the first time since the 2020 Winter Youth Olympics, to allow worldwide spectators following the end of the COVID-19 pandemic. K-pop groups Hori7on, Lun8, and TripleS performed at the ceremony, along with rappers Ash Island, Hwasa, and Changmo. The cauldron was lit by freestyle skier Lee Jeong-min. A secondary digital flame was lit in Gangneung Olympic Park by a volunteer.

=== Closing ceremony ===
The closing ceremony of the 2024 Winter Youth Olympic Games took place on the evening of 1 February 2024 outside of the Gangneung Hockey Centre in Gangneung. Rapper Lee Young-ji performed at the ceremony. The ceremony ended with the digital flame being extinguished.

=== Medal table ===
* Host nation (South Korea)

Rank	Nation	Gold	Silver	Bronze	Total
1	Italy	11	3	4	18
2	Germany	9	5	6	20
3	South Korea*	7	6	4	17
4	France	7	5	6	18
5	China	6	9	3	18
6	United States	5	11	5	21
7	Austria	5	6	5	16
8	Sweden	4	4	3	11
9	Great Britain	4	1	1	6
10	Japan	3	4	8	15
11–32	Remaining	20	27	36	83
Totals (32 entries)		81	81	81	243

Source: Gangwon 2024

== Marketing ==
The organizing committee has announced many "ambassadors" to promote the games, including Olympians Eileen Gu, Choi Min-jeong, and Yuna Kim, in addition to singers such as Choi Min-ho from the South Korean boy band Shinee.

The official song of the games is titled "We Go High".

=== Mascot ===
Moongcho (뭉초)
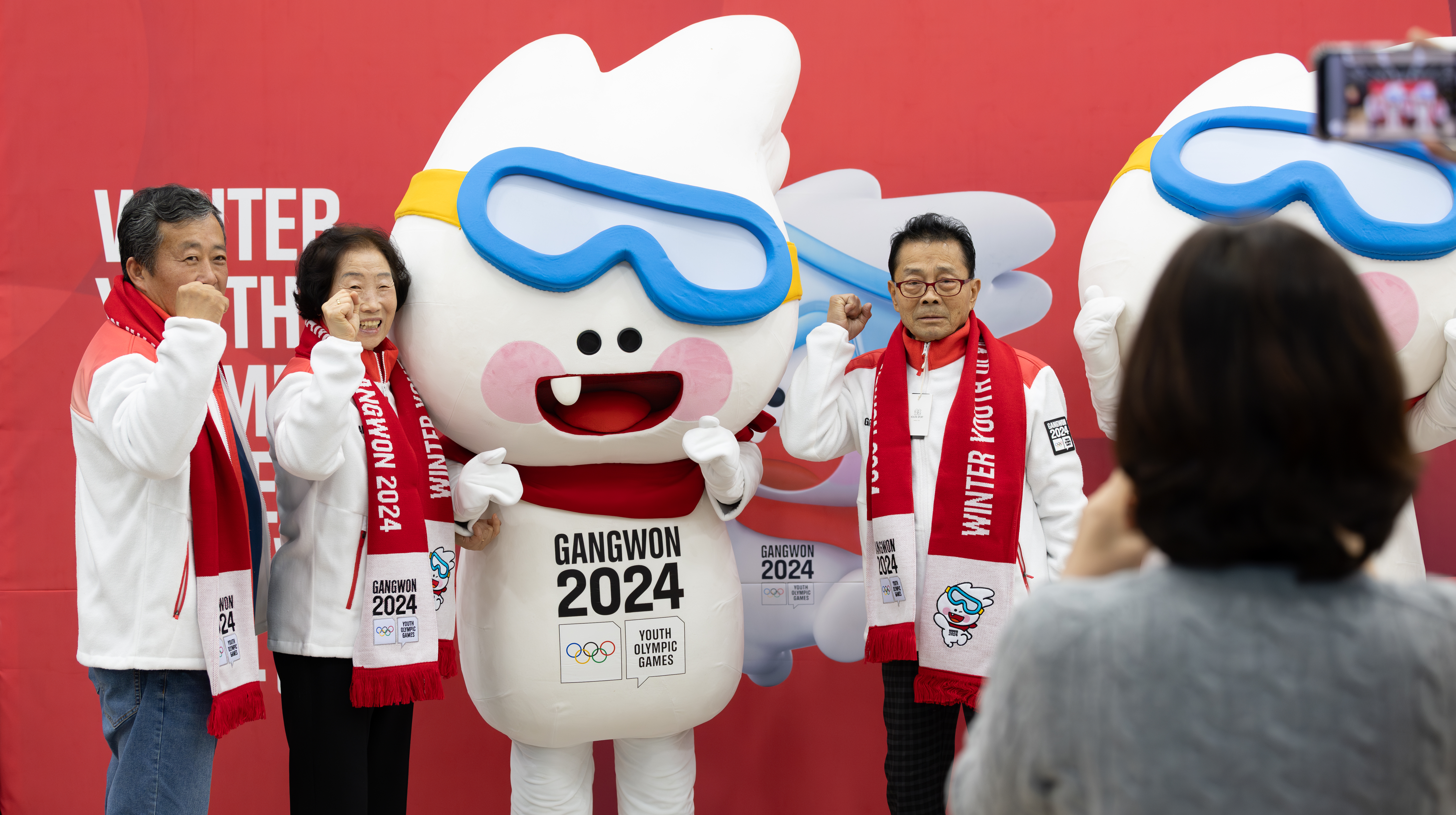

Mascot of the 2024 Winter Youth Olympics (Gangwon)
- Creator: Soo-Yeon Park
- Significance: A snowball

On 19 January 2023, the organizing committee revealed the mascot, named Moongcho (뭉초). It was designed by college student Soo-Yeon Park. The mascot is in shape of a snowball that was born from a snow fight between Soohorang and Bandabi, the mascots of the 2018 Winter Olympics and Paralympics.

=== Tickets ===
The organizing committee has announced that all events apart from the opening ceremony would be free to watch.

=== Torch relay ===
The torch relay started on October 3, 2023 in Greece at the Panathenaic Stadium, where the flame was lit. The flame reached Seoul, South Korea, on 8 October, with the South Korean leg of the relay beginning that day. The relay ended on 19 January 2024 at the opening ceremony, as the cauldron was lit by freestyle skier Lee Jeong-min.

== See also ==
- Winter sports:
  - 2018 Winter Olympics and 2018 Winter Paralympics in Pyeongchang, Gangwon, South Korea
- Summer sports:
  - 1988 Summer Olympics and 1988 Summer Paralympics in Seoul, South Korea

Preceded by Lausanne	Winter Youth Olympic Games; Gangwon; 2024	Succeeded by Dolomites–Valtellina
