= Denmark at the 2024 Winter Youth Olympics =

- Flag of Denmark
- IOC code: DEN
- NOC: Danish Olympic Committee

in Gangwon, South Korea 19 January 2024 – 1 February 2024
- Competitors: 21 in 5 sports
- Flag bearers (opening): Max Kramer & Maja Voigt
- Flag bearer (closing): TBD
- Medals Ranked 16th: Gold 1 Silver 3 Bronze 0 Total 4

Winter Youth Olympics appearances
- 2012; 2016; 2020; 2024

Denmark is scheduled to compete at the 2024 Winter Youth Olympics in Gangwon, South Korea, from 19 January to 1 February 2024. This will be Denmark's fourth appearance at the Winter Youth Olympic Games, having competed at every Games since the inaugural edition in 2012.

Ice hockey player Max Kramer and bobsledder Maja Voigt were the country's flagbearers during the opening ceremony.

On 22 January, bobsledder Maja Voigt earned the gold medal in the women's monobob, becoming the first Danish athlete to win a Winter Youth Olympics medal outside of mixed-NOC competition.

== Competitors ==
The following is the list of number of competitors (per gender) participating at the games per sport/discipline.

Sport	Men	Women	Total
Biathlon	0	1	1
Bobsleigh	0	1	1
Curling	2	2	4
Ice hockey	13	0	13
Skeleton	1	1	2
Total	16	5	21

== Medalists ==
Medal	Name	Sport	Event	Date
Gold	Maja Voigt	Bobsleigh	Women's monobob	22 January
Silver	Denmark men's national under-16 ice hockey team	Ice hockey	Men's 3x3 tournament	25 January
Silver	Jacob Schmidt; Katrine Schmidt; Nikki Jensen; Emilie Holtermann	Curling	Mixed team	25 January
Silver	Katrine Schmidt; Jacob Schmidt	Curling	Mixed doubles	1 February

== Biathlon ==
Women

Athlete	Event	Time	Misses	Rank
Leonora Rønhede	Sprint	22:01.9	2 (0+2)	19
Leonora Rønhede	Individual	40:41.3	3 (0+3+0+0)	14

== Bobsleigh ==
Denmark qualified one female bobsledder.

Athlete	Event	Run 1		Run 2		Total	
Athlete	Event	Time	Rank	Time	Rank	Time	Rank
Maja Voigt	Women's monobob	56.19	1	57.12	1	1:53.31	1st place, gold medalist(s)

== Curling ==
Denmark qualified a mixed team and mixed doubles for a total of six athletes (three per gener). However, the final team named had the mixed doubles pair also being a part of the mixed team tournament.

Summary

Team	Event	Group Stage								Quarterfinal	Semifinal	Final / BM	
Team	Event	Opposition Score	Opposition Score	Opposition Score	Opposition Score	Opposition Score	Opposition Score	Opposition Score	Rank	Opposition Score	Opposition Score	Opposition Score	Rank
Jacob Schmidt; Katrine Schmidt; Nikki Jensen; Emilie Holtermann	Mixed team	Great Britain; L 6–7	Switzerland; W 6–4	Brazil; W 14–1	Italy; W 7–3	South Korea; L 4–5	Germany; W 7–6	Canada; W 4–2	2 Q	Japan; W 8–3	China; W 6–4	Great Britain; L 5–7	2nd place, silver medalist(s)
Katrine Schmidt; Jacob Schmidt	Mixed doubles	Italy; W 13–3	Switzerland; L 3–6	Austria; W 11–4	Germany; W 9–4	Kazakhstan; W 15–3	—N/a		1 Q	Japan; W 9–7	United States; W 6–5	Great Britain; L 6–7	2nd place, silver medalist(s)

=== Mixed team ===
Group B	Skip	W	L	W–L	PF	PA	EW	EL	BE	SE	DSC
Great Britain	Logan Carson	6	1	–	44	30	26	21	4	7	51.75
Denmark	Jacob Schmidt	5	2	–	48	28	27	20	2	9	34.70
Switzerland	Nathan Dryburgh	4	3	2–0	52	35	25	23	5	7	39.96
Italy	Andrea Gilli	4	3	1–1	46	38	29	23	3	7	50.58
South Korea	Kim Dae-hyun	4	3	0–2	48	33	24	22	3	8	109.88
Canada	Nathan Gray	3	4	–	40	34	24	20	3	11	35.43
Brazil	Pedro Ribeiro	1	6	1–0	17	81	13	31	0	2	103.39
Germany	Lukas Jäger	1	6	0–1	30	46	19	27	2	5	68.51

Round robin

Draw 1

Saturday, January 20, 14:00

Sheet C	1	2	3	4	5	6	7	8	Final
Denmark (Schmidt)	0	2	0	0	2	0	2	0	6
Great Britain (Carson) 🔨	2	0	1	1	0	1	0	2	7

Draw 2

Sunday, January 21, 10:00

Sheet A	1	2	3	4	5	6	7	8	Final
Switzerland (Dryburgh)	0	1	0	1	0	2	0	X	4
Denmark (Schmidt) 🔨	2	0	1	0	2	0	1	X	6

Draw 3

Sunday, January 21, 18:00

Sheet D	1	2	3	4	5	6	7	8	Final
Brazil (Ribeiro)	0	0	0	0	1	0	X	X	1
Denmark (Schmidt) 🔨	3	3	2	2	0	4	X	X	14

Draw 4

Monday, January 22, 14:00

Sheet C	1	2	3	4	5	6	7	8	Final
Italy (Gilli)	0	0	2	0	0	1	0	X	3
Denmark (Schmidt) 🔨	3	0	0	2	1	0	1	X	7

Draw 5

Tuesday, January 23, 10:00

Sheet B	1	2	3	4	5	6	7	8	Final
Denmark (Schmidt) 🔨	0	2	0	0	1	0	1	0	4
South Korea (Kim)	1	0	0	1	0	1	0	2	5

Draw 6

Tuesday, January 23, 18:00

Sheet A	1	2	3	4	5	6	7	8	Final
Denmark (Schmidt) 🔨	0	0	0	0	2	2	1	2	7
Germany (Jäger)	0	1	3	2	0	0	0	0	6

Draw 7

Wednesday, January 24, 13:00

Sheet B	1	2	3	4	5	6	7	8	Final
Canada (Gray) 🔨	0	0	1	0	1	0	0	0	2
Denmark (Schmidt)	0	1	0	1	0	0	1	1	4

Qualification Game

Wednesday, January 24, 19:00

Sheet C	1	2	3	4	5	6	7	8	Final
Denmark (Schmidt) 🔨	2	1	1	0	3	0	1	X	8
Japan (Fujii)	0	0	0	1	0	2	0	X	3

Semifinal

Thursday, January 25, 9:00

Sheet A	1	2	3	4	5	6	7	8	Final
China (Li) 🔨	2	0	1	0	0	1	0	0	4
Denmark (Schmidt)	0	2	0	2	1	0	0	1	6

Gold medal game

Thursday, January 25, 18:00

Sheet B	1	2	3	4	5	6	7	8	9	Final
Denmark (Schmidt)	0	4	0	0	0	0	0	1	0	5
Great Britain (Carson) 🔨	1	0	1	1	1	0	1	0	2	7

=== Mixed doubles ===
Group D	W	L	W–L	DSC
Denmark	4	1	1–1	30.64
Germany	4	1	1–1	31.04
Switzerland	4	1	1–1	79.90
Austria	2	3	–	40.68
Kazakhstan	1	4	–	44.33
Italy	0	5	–	107.78

Round robin

Draw 2

Saturday, January 27, 10:00

Sheet D	1	2	3	4	5	6	7	8	Final
Italy (Maioni / Nichelatti)	0	3	0	0	0	0	X	X	3
Denmark (Schmidt / Schmidt) 🔨	2	0	4	4	2	1	X	X	13

Draw 6

Sunday, January 28, 14:00

Sheet A	1	2	3	4	5	6	7	8	Final
Denmark (Schmidt / Schmidt) 🔨	0	0	0	2	0	1	0	0	3
Switzerland (Haehlen / Caccivio)	1	1	1	0	1	0	1	1	6

Draw 8

Monday, January 29, 10:00

Sheet C	1	2	3	4	5	6	7	8	Final
Austria (Müller / Heinisch)	0	2	0	1	0	1	X	X	4
Denmark (Schmidt / Schmidt) 🔨	4	0	6	0	1	0	X	X	11

Draw 13

Tuesday, January 30, 18:00

Sheet B	1	2	3	4	5	6	7	8	Final
Denmark (Schmidt / Schmidt) 🔨	2	0	1	3	2	0	1	X	9
Germany (Sutor / Angrick)	0	1	0	0	0	3	0	X	4

Draw 15

Wednesday, January 31, 12:30

Sheet B	1	2	3	4	5	6	7	8	Final
Kazakhstan (Tastemir / Tastemir)	0	0	0	0	3	0	X	X	3
Denmark (Schmidt / Schmidt) 🔨	4	1	3	1	0	6	X	X	15

Quarterfinal

Wednesday, January 31, 19:00

Sheet D	1	2	3	4	5	6	7	8	Final
Denmark (Schmidt / Schmidt)	0	0	4	2	0	0	3	0	9
Japan (Tanaka / Kawai) 🔨	1	1	0	0	3	1	0	1	7

Semifinal

Thursday, February 1, 9:00

Sheet A	1	2	3	4	5	6	7	8	Final
United States (Wendling / Paral)	1	0	1	1	0	1	1	0	5
Denmark (Schmidt / Schmidt) 🔨	0	2	0	0	3	0	0	1	6

Gold medal game

Thursday, February 1, 16:00

Sheet B	1	2	3	4	5	6	7	8	Final
Great Britain (Soutar / Brewster)	2	1	0	0	3	0	1	0	7
Denmark (Schmidt / Schmidt) 🔨	0	0	2	2	0	1	0	1	6

== Ice hockey ==
Denmark qualified thirteen ice hockey players for the men's 3-on-3 tournament.

Roster

Lasse Thomsen served as head coach.

- Lucas Althof Christensen – A
- Frederik Bech
- Mikkel Bjerre
- William Brix
- Luca Bærentsen
- Emil Saaby Jakobsen
- Andreas Jørgensen
- Max Kramer – C
- Mikkel Poulsen
- Gustav Remler-Jensen
- Martinus Uggerhøj Schioldan – A
- Casey Joshua Silverman
- Anton Emil Wilde Larsen

Summary

Key:
- GWS – Match decided by penalty-shootout

Team	Event	Group stage								Semifinal	Final	
Team	Event	Opposition Score	Opposition Score	Opposition Score	Opposition Score	Opposition Score	Opposition Score	Opposition Score	Rank	Opposition Score	Opposition Score	Rank
Denmark	Men's 3x3 tournament	Chinese Taipei; W 11–2	Spain; W 15–2	Great Britain; W 14–4	Kazakhstan; W 8–6	Poland; W 11–7	Austria; L 5–7	Latvia; L 6–11	3 Q	Austria; W 5–3	Latvia; L 3–10	2nd place, silver medalist(s)

=== Men's 3x3 tournament ===
Preliminary round

Pos	Team	Pld	W	SOW	SOL	L	GF	GA	GD	Pts	Qualification
1	Latvia	7	7	0	0	0	119	31	+88	21	Semifinals
2	Austria	7	5	0	0	2	55	32	+23	15 (Note: Austria 7–5 Denmark)	Semifinals
3	Denmark	7	5	0	0	2	70	39	+31	15	Semifinals
4	Kazakhstan	7	4	0	0	3	93	59	+34	12 (Note: Poland 8–18 Kazakhstan)	Semifinals
5	Poland	7	4	0	0	3	58	59	−1	12	
6	Great Britain	7	2	0	0	5	46	97	−51	6	
7	Chinese Taipei	7	1	0	0	6	23	95	−72	3	
8	Spain	7	0	0	0	7	28	80	−52	0	

Source: Gangwon 2024
Notes:

20 January 2024; 13:30	Chinese Taipei	2–11 (0–2, 1–4, 1–5)	Denmark	Gangneung Hockey Centre

Game reference
Referees: (Canada) Mathieu Boudreau (South Korea) Lim Jun-seo

21 January 2024; 10:30	Denmark	15–2 (4–1, 5–0, 6–1)	Spain	Gangneung Hockey Centre

Game reference
Referees: (Canada) Mathieu Boudreau (Czech Republic) David Thuma

21 January 2024; 16:00	Denmark	14–4 (3–2, 5–0, 6–2)	Great Britain	Gangneung Hockey Centre

Game reference
Referees: (Uzbekistan) David Prokofyev (United Kingdom) Joseph Sewell

22 January 2024; 09:00	Kazakhstan	6–8 (3–1, 1–3, 2–4)	Denmark	Gangneung Hockey Centre

Game reference
Referees: (Uzbekistan) David Prokofyev (Czech Republic) David Thuma

22 January 2024; 17:30	Denmark	11–7 (5–2, 1–2, 5–3)	Poland	Gangneung Hockey Centre

Game reference
Referees: (Uzbekistan) David Prokofyev (United Kingdom) Joseph Sewell

23 January 2024; 10:30	Austria	7–5 (2–1, 2–1, 3–3)	Denmark	Gangneung Hockey Centre

Game reference
Referees: (Canada) Mathieu Boudreau (United Kingdom) Joseph Sewell

23 January 2024; 16:00	Denmark	6–11 (3–4, 1–4, 2–3)	Latvia	Gangneung Hockey Centre

Game reference
Referees: (Canada) Mathieu Boudreau (Czech Republic) David Thuma

Semifinals

24 January 2024; 13:30	Austria	3–5 (2–1, 0–2, 1–2)	Denmark	Gangneung Hockey Centre

Game reference
Referees: (United Kingdom) Joseph Sewell (Czech Republic) David Thuma

Final

25 January 2024; 14:00	Latvia	10–3 (6–1, 2–0, 2–2)	Denmark	Gangneung Hockey Centre

Game reference
Referees: (Canada) Mathieu Boudreau (Czech Republic) David Thuma

== Skeleton ==
Athlete	Event	Run 1		Run 2		Total	
Athlete	Event	Time	Rank	Time	Rank	Time	Rank
Daniel Pedersen	Men's	55.56	12	55.38	12	1:50.94	12
Nanna Vestergaard Johansen	Women's	55.74	8	54.54	2	1:50.28	4

== See also ==
- Denmark at the 2024 Summer Olympics
