= Chinese Taipei at the 2024 Winter Youth Olympics =

- Flag of Chinese Taipei
- IOC code: TPE
- NOC: Chinese Taipei Olympic Committee

in Gangwon, South Korea 19 January 2024 – 1 February 2024
- Competitors: 19 in 4 sports
- Flag bearers (opening): Kai-Zhen Wu & Wei-Chen Tai
- Flag bearer (closing): TBD
- Medals: Gold 0 Silver 0 Bronze 0 Total 0

Winter Youth Olympics appearances (overview)
- 2012; 2016; 2020; 2024

Chinese Taipei is scheduled to compete at the 2024 Winter Youth Olympics in Gangwon, South Korea, from January 19 to February 1, 2024. This will be Chinese Taipei's fourth appearance at the Winter Youth Olympic Games, having competed at every Games since the inaugural edition in 2012.

The Chinese Taipei team consisted of 19 athletes (16 men and three women) competing in four sports. This marked the largest ever team Chinese Taipei has sent to a Winter Youth Olympics. Hockey player Kai-Zhen Wu and luger Wei-Chen Tai were the country's flagbearers during the opening ceremony.

== Competitors ==
The following is the list of number of competitors (per gender) participating at the games per sport/discipline.

Sport	Men	Women	Total
Cross-country skiing	2	1	3
Figure skating	0	1	1
Ice hockey	13	0	13
Luge	1	1	2
Total	16	3	19

== Cross-country skiing ==
Chinese Taipei qualified three cross-country skiers (two men and one woman).

Athlete	Event	Qualification		Quarterfinal		Semifinal		Final	
Athlete	Event	Time	Rank	Time	Rank	Time	Rank	Time	Rank
Lee Chieh-Han	Men's 7.5 km classical	—N/a						25:47.6	68
Lee Chieh-Han	Men's sprint freestyle	3:53.05	74	Did not advance					
Liu Hao-en	Men's 7.5 km classical	—N/a						28:44.1	76
Liu Hao-en	Men's sprint freestyle	4:17.16	78	Did not advance					
Tsai Chiao-wei	Women's 7.5 km classical	—N/a						46:43.5	76
Tsai Chiao-wei	Women's sprint freestyle	6:00.57	79	Did not advance					

== Figure skating ==
Chinese Taipei qualified one female skater. The quota place was earned based on the results of the 2023–24 ISU Junior Grand Prix ranking. This marks the country's sport debut at the Winter Youth Olympics.

Singles

Athlete	Event	SP		FS		Total	
Athlete	Event	Points	Rank	Points	Rank	Points	Rank
Tsai Yu-feng	Women's	56.46	9	100.18	11	156.64	10

== Ice hockey ==
Chinese Taipei qualified a team of thirteen ice hockey players (eleven skaters and two goaltenders) for the men's 3-on-3 ice hockey tournament.

Team roster

Huang Jen-Hung served as head coach and Yang Chang-Hsing was assistant coach.

- Chan Shun-Yu
- Chen Chun-Lin
- Chen Chun-Yu
- Chen Lilong
- Chen Shou-Yi
- Chen Ting-Shu – A
- Chi Kai-Yuan
- Chiu Hsien-Cheng
- Peng Li-Hung
- Wang Kuan-Yao
- Wu Kai-Zhen – C
- Wu Yu-Chen
- Yang Ting-Chia – A

Summary

Key:
- GWS – Game winning shots

Team	Event	Group stage								Semifinal	Final	
Team	Event	Opponent Score	Opponent Score	Opponent Score	Opponent Score	Opponent Score	Opponent Score	Opponent Score	Rank	Opponent Score	Opponent Score	Rank
Chinese Taipei	Men's 3-on-3 tournament	Denmark; L 2–11	Poland; L 8–10	Austria; L 1–18	Latvia; L 2–28	Kazakhstan; L 2–14	Great Britain; L 3–10	Spain; W 5–4	7	Did not advance		

=== Men's 3x3 tournament ===
Preliminary round

Pos	Team	Pld	W	SOW	SOL	L	GF	GA	GD	Pts	Qualification
1	Latvia	7	7	0	0	0	119	31	+88	21	Semifinals
2	Austria	7	5	0	0	2	55	32	+23	15 (Note: Austria 7–5 Denmark)	Semifinals
3	Denmark	7	5	0	0	2	70	39	+31	15	Semifinals
4	Kazakhstan	7	4	0	0	3	93	59	+34	12 (Note: Poland 8–18 Kazakhstan)	Semifinals
5	Poland	7	4	0	0	3	58	59	−1	12	
6	Great Britain	7	2	0	0	5	46	97	−51	6	
7	Chinese Taipei	7	1	0	0	6	23	95	−72	3	
8	Spain	7	0	0	0	7	28	80	−52	0	

Source: Gangwon 2024
Notes:

20 January 2024; 13:30	Chinese Taipei	2–11 (0–2, 1–4, 1–5)	Denmark	Gangneung Hockey Centre

Game reference
Referees: (Canada) Mathieu Boudreau (South Korea) Lim Jun-seo

21 January 2024; 09:00	Poland	10–8 (5–2, 3–1, 2–5)	Chinese Taipei	Gangneung Hockey Centre

Game reference
Referees: (United Kingdom) Joseph Sewell (Czech Republic) David Thuma

21 January 2024; 17:30	Austria	18–1 (3–1, 8–1, 7–0)	Chinese Taipei	Gangneung Hockey Centre

Game reference
Referees: (South Korea) Lim Jun-seo (Uzbekistan) David Prokofyev

22 January 2024; 10:30	Latvia	28–2 (14–1, 9–0, 5–1)	Chinese Taipei	Gangneung Hockey Centre

Game reference
Referees: (South Korea) JunSeo Lim (Czech Republic) David Thuma

22 January 2024; 16:00	Chinese Taipei	2–14 (1–7, 1–1, 0–6)	Kazakhstan	Gangneung Hockey Centre

Game reference
Referees: (Canada) Mathieu Boudreau (South Korea) Lim Jun-seo

23 January 2024; 09:00	Chinese Taipei	3–10 (1–2, 2–1, 0–7)	Great Britain	Gangneung Hockey Centre

Game reference
Referees: (Uzbekistan) David Prokofyev (Czech Republic) David Thuma

23 January 2024; 16:00	Spain	4–5 (2–1, 0–2, 2–2)	Chinese Taipei	Gangneung Hockey Centre

Game reference
Referees: (South Korea) Lim Jun-seo (Uzbekistan) David Prokofyev

== Luge ==
Chinese Taipei qualified two lugers (one per gender).

Athlete	Event	Run 1		Run 2		Total	
Athlete	Event	Time	Rank	Time	Rank	Time	Rank
Tsai Meng-Hsin	Men's singles	DNS					
Tai Wei-Chen	Women's singles	50.674	25	49.855	18	1:40.529	23

== See also ==
- Chinese Taipei at the 2024 Summer Olympics
