= Latvia at the 2024 Winter Youth Olympics =

- Flag of Latvia
- IOC code: LAT
- NOC: Latvian Olympic Committee

in Gangwon, South Korea 19 January 2024 – 1 February 2024
- Competitors: 45 in 11 sports
- Flag bearer (opening): Olivers Mūrnieks & Amēlija Kotāne
- Flag bearer (closing): TBD
- Medals Ranked 14th: Gold 2 Silver 3 Bronze 1 Total 6

Winter Youth Olympics appearances
- 2012; 2016; 2020; 2024

Latvia is scheduled to compete at the 2024 Winter Youth Olympics in Gangwon, South Korea, from January 19 to February 1, 2024, This will be Latvia's fourth appearance at the Winter Youth Olympic Games, having competed at every Games since the inaugural edition in 2012.

The Latvian delegation comprises 45 athletes competing in eleven sports. Skeleton racer Amēlija Kotāne and ice hockey team captain Olivers Mūrnieks were the country's flagbearers during the opening ceremony.

== Competitors ==
The following is the list of number of competitors (per gender) participating at the games per sport/discipline.

Sport	Men	Women	Total
Alpine skiing	1	1	2
Biathlon	3	6	6
Bobsleigh	0	2	2
Cross-country skiing	2	2	4
Curling	1	1	2
Figure skating	1	1	2
Ice hockey	13	0	13
Luge	3	3	6
Short track speed skating	0	2	2
Skeleton	2	3	5
Speed skating	1	0	1
Total	27	18	45

== Medalists ==
Medal	Name	Sport	Event	Date
Gold	Emīls Indriksons	Skeleton	Men's	23 January
Gold	Latvia men's national under-16 ice hockey team	Ice hockey	Men's 3x3 tournament	25 January
Silver	Jānis Gruzdulis-Borovojs; Ēdens Eduards Čepulis	Luge	Men's doubles	20 January
Silver	Dārta Neimane	Skeleton	Women's	22 January
Silver	Ēdens Eduards Čepulis; Jānis Gruzdulis-Borovojs; Edvards Marts Markitāns; Margita Sirsniņa	Luge	Team relay	23 January
Bronze	Laura Lēģere	Skeleton	Women's	22 January

== Alpine skiing ==
Latvia qualified two alpine skiers (one per gender).

Men

Athlete	Event	Run 1		Run 2		Total	
Athlete	Event	Time	Rank	Time	Rank	Time	Rank
Pauls Pēteris Prancāns	Super-G	—				1:00.52	48
Pauls Pēteris Prancāns	Giant slalom	56.65	53	50.99	38	1:47.64	39
Pauls Pēteris Prancāns	Slalom	53.47	48	Did not finish			
Pauls Pēteris Prancāns	Combined	1:00.54	49	Did not finish			

Women

Athlete	Event	Run 1		Run 2		Total	
Athlete	Event	Time	Rank	Time	Rank	Time	Rank
Frīda Saļņikova	Super-G	—				58.48	40
Frīda Saļņikova	Giant slalom	54.60	34	57.82	27	1:52.42	27
Frīda Saļņikova	Slalom	55.09	33	53.39	24	1:48.48	24
Frīda Saļņikova	Combined	1:00.19	38	58.38	28	1:58.57	28

== Biathlon ==
Latvia qualified six biathaletes (three per gender).

Men

Athlete	Event	Time	Misses	Rank
Olivers Bresme	Sprint	Did not start		
Olivers Bresme	Individual	51:27.8	9 (2+2+3+2)	67
Valters Bresme	Sprint	25:16.6	4 (3+1)	64
Valters Bresme	Individual	50:39.8	8 (2+2+4+0)	64
Adrians Šņoriņš	Sprint	24:35.4	4 (1+3)	49
Adrians Šņoriņš	Individual	48:14.9	6 (2+1+1+2)	40

Women

Athlete	Event	Time	Misses	Rank
Stella Bleidele	Individual	48:43.5	4 (2+1+0+1)	80
Keita Kolna	Sprint	24:22.6	3 (1+2)	50
Keita Kolna	Individual	48:11.8	5 (1+2+0+2)	77
Madara Veckalniņa	Sprint	24:47.5	3 (2+1)	54
Madara Veckalniņa	Individual	46:47.1	5 (2+1+2+0)	66

Mixed

Athletes	Event	Time	Misses	Rank
Madara Veckalniņa; Adrians Šņoriņš	Single mixed relay	52:51.2	6+18	23
Keita Kolna; Madara Veckalniņa; Valters Bresme; Adrians Šņoriņšš	Mixed relay	Did not start		

== Bobsleigh ==
Latvia qualified two female bobsledders.

Athlete	Event	Run 1		Run 2		Total	
Athlete	Event	Time	Rank	Time	Rank	Time	Rank
Amēlija Kotāne	Women's monobob	56.84	2	57.70	5	1:54.54	4
Kate Prudāne	Women's monobob	57.08	4	57.73	6	1:54.81	5

== Cross-country skiing ==
Latvia qualified four cross-country skiers (two per gender).

Men

Athlete	Event	Qualification		Quarterfinal		Semifinal		Final	
Athlete	Event	Time	Rank	Time	Rank	Time	Rank	Time	Rank
Ritvars Ļepeškins	7.5 km classical	—						22:12.0	43
Ritvars Ļepeškins	Sprint freestyle	3:11.16	23 Q	3:10.88	6	Did not advance			
Jēkabs Skolnieks	7.5 km classical	—						Did not start	
Jēkabs Skolnieks	Sprint freestyle	3:13.88	31	Did not advance					

Women

Athlete	Event	Qualification		Quarterfinal		Semifinal		Final	
Athlete	Event	Time	Rank	Time	Rank	Time	Rank	Time	Rank
Martīne Djatkoviča	7.5 km classical	—						28:01.6	53
Martīne Djatkoviča	Sprint freestyle	4:03.97	47	Did not advance					
Linda Kaparkalēja	7.5 km classical	—						Did not start	
Linda Kaparkalēja	Sprint freestyle	3:47.75	27 Q	3:55.89	5	Did not advance			

Mixed

Athlete	Event	Time	Rank
Linda Kaparkalēja; Jēkabs Skolnieks; Martīne Djatkoviča; Ritvars Ļepeškins	Mixed relay	59:00.0	17

== Curling ==
Latvia qualified a mixed doubles pair for a total of two athletes (one per gender).

Summary

Team	Event	Group Stage						Quarterfinal	Semifinal	Final / BM	
Team	Event	Opposition Score	Opposition Score	Opposition Score	Opposition Score	Opposition Score	Rank	Opposition Score	Opposition Score	Opposition Score	Rank
Agate Regža; Kristaps Zass	Mixed doubles	Turkey; W 10–1	China; L 5–8	New Zealand; W 9–4	Brazil; W 6–3	Japan; L 4–5	3	Did not advance			11

=== Mixed doubles ===
Group C	W	L	W–L	DSC
China	5	0	–	56.80
Japan	4	1	–	38.84
Latvia	3	2	–	77.39
Turkey	2	3	–	89.37
New Zealand	1	4	–	94.80
Brazil	0	5	–	112.92

Round robin

Draw 4

Saturday, January 27, 18:00

Sheet B	1	2	3	4	5	6	7	8	Final
Latvia (Regža / Zass)	1	1	0	4	2	2	X	X	10
Turkey (Ekmekçi / Aybar)	0	0	1	0	0	0	X	X	1

Draw 5

Sunday, January 28, 10:00

Sheet C	1	2	3	4	5	6	7	8	Final
Latvia (Regža / Zass)	0	0	2	0	1	0	0	2	5
China (Gong / Xu)	3	2	0	1	0	1	1	0	8

Draw 9

Monday, January 29, 14:00

Sheet D	1	2	3	4	5	6	7	8	Final
New Zealand (Russell / Nevill)	0	1	0	1	0	2	0	X	4
Latvia (Regža / Zass)	2	0	2	0	2	0	3	X	9

Draw 13

Tuesday, January 30, 18:00

Sheet A	1	2	3	4	5	6	7	8	Final
Latvia (Regža / Zass)	2	2	0	0	1	1	0	X	6
Brazil (Gentile / Melo)	0	0	1	1	0	0	1	X	3

Draw 15

Wednesday, January 31, 12:30

Sheet C	1	2	3	4	5	6	7	8	Final
Japan (Tanaka / Kawai)	0	1	1	0	1	0	1	1	5
Latvia (Regža / Zass)	2	0	0	1	0	1	0	0	4

== Figure skating ==
Latvia qualified two figure skaters (one per gender).

Athlete	Event	SP/SD		FS/FD		Total	
Athlete	Event	Points	Rank	Points	Rank	Points	Rank
Kirills Korkačs	Men's singles	53.36	16	91.07	17	144.43	17
Sofja Stepčenko	Women's singles	44.77	16	76.02	16	120.79	16

== Ice hockey ==
Latvia qualified thirteen ice hockey players for the men's 3-on-3 ice hockey tournament.

Roster

Lauris Dārziņš served as head coach.

- Martins Bārtulis
- Leonards Aleksandrs Grundmanis
- Martins Klaucāns – A
- Roberts Kravalis
- Herberts Laugalis
- Timurs Mališevs
- Makss Mihailovs
- Olivers Mūrnieks – C
- Kristers Obuks – A
- Fēlikss Niks Paurs
- Patriks Plūmiņš
- Daniels Reidzāns
- Ričards Rutkis

Summary

Key:
- GWS – Match decided by penalty-shootout

Team	Event	Group stage								Semifinal	Final	
Team	Event	Opponent Score	Opponent Score	Opponent Score	Opponent Score	Opponent Score	Opponent Score	Opponent Score	Rank	Opponent Score	Opponent Score	Rank
Latvia	Men's 3x3 tournament	Spain; W 24–5	Great Britain; W 24–1	Kazakhstan; W 15–11	Chinese Taipei; W 28–2	Austria; W 9–3	Poland; W 8–3	Denmark; W 11–6	1	Kazakhstan; W 19–5	Denmark; W 10–3	1st place, gold medalist(s)

=== Men's 3x3 tournament ===
Preliminary round

Pos	Team	Pld	W	SOW	SOL	L	GF	GA	GD	Pts	Qualification
1	Latvia	7	7	0	0	0	119	31	+88	21	Semifinals
2	Austria	7	5	0	0	2	55	32	+23	15 (Note: Austria 7–5 Denmark)	Semifinals
3	Denmark	7	5	0	0	2	70	39	+31	15	Semifinals
4	Kazakhstan	7	4	0	0	3	93	59	+34	12 (Note: Poland 8–18 Kazakhstan)	Semifinals
5	Poland	7	4	0	0	3	58	59	−1	12	
6	Great Britain	7	2	0	0	5	46	97	−51	6	
7	Chinese Taipei	7	1	0	0	6	23	95	−72	3	
8	Spain	7	0	0	0	7	28	80	−52	0	

Source: Gangwon 2024
Notes:

20 January 2024; 13:30	Latvia	24–5 (9–2, 7–2, 8–1)	Spain	Gangneung Hockey Centre

Game reference
Referees: (Uzbekistan) David Prokofyev (Czech Republic) David Thuma

21 January 2024; 09:00	Great Britain	1–24 (1–8, 0–6, 0–10)	Latvia	Gangneung Hockey Centre

Game reference
Referees: (Canada) Mathieu Boudreau (Uzbekistan) David Prokofyev

21 January 2024; 17:30	Latvia	15–11 (5–6, 6–0, 4–5)	Kazakhstan	Gangneung Hockey Centre

Game reference
Referees: (Canada) Mathieu Boudreau (United Kingdom) Joseph Sewell

22 January 2024; 10:30	Latvia	28–2 (14–1, 9–0, 5–1)	Chinese Taipei	Gangneung Hockey Centre

Game reference
Referees: (South Korea) JunSeo Lim (Czech Republic) David Thuma

22 January 2024; 16:00	Latvia	9–3 (2–0, 3–0, 4–3)	Austria	Gangneung Hockey Centre

Game reference
Referees: (Uzbekistan) David Prokofyev (United Kingdom) Joseph Sewell

23 January 2024; 09:00	Poland	3–8 (0–1, 2–1, 1–6)	Latvia	Gangneung Hockey Centre

Game reference
Referees: (South Korea) Lim Jun-seo (United Kingdom) Joseph Sewell

23 January 2024; 16:00	Denmark	6–11 (3–4, 1–4, 2–3)	Latvia	Gangneung Hockey Centre

Game reference
Referees: (Canada) Mathieu Boudreau (Czech Republic) David Thuma

Semifinals

24 January 2024; 12:00	Latvia	19–5 (9–1, 3–2, 7–2)	Kazakhstan	Gangneung Hockey Centre

Game reference
Referees: (Canada) Mathieu Boudreau (Uzbekistan) David Prokofyev

Final

25 January 2024; 14:00	Latvia	10–3 (6–1, 2–0, 2–2)	Denmark	Gangneung Hockey Centre

Game reference
Referees: (Canada) Mathieu Boudreau (Czech Republic) David Thuma

== Luge ==
Latvia qualified six lugers (three per gender).

Men

Athlete	Event	Run 1		Run 2		Total	
Athlete	Event	Time	Rank	Time	Rank	Time	Rank
Edvards Marts Markitānsl	Singles	46.809	4	46.612	4	1:33.421	4
Jānis Gruzdulis-Borovojs; Edens Eduards Čepulis	Doubles	47.383	2	47.247	1	1:34.630	2nd place, silver medalist(s)

Women

Athlete	Event	Run 1		Run 2		Total	
Athlete	Event	Time	Rank	Time	Rank	Time	Rank
Amanda Ogorodņikova	Singles	48.664	6	48.683	6	1:37.347	6
Margita Sirsniņa	Singles	48.739	7	48.379	3	1:37.118	5
Margita Sirsniņa; Madara Pavlova	Doubles	Did not finish		Did not start			

Mixed

Athlete	Event	Women' singles		Men' singles		Doubles		Total	
Athlete	Event	Time	Rank	Time	Rank	Time	Rank	Time	Rank
Margita Sirsniņa; Edvards Marts Markitānsl; Jānis Gruzdulis-Borovojsl; Ēdens Eduards Čepulis	Team relay	49.241	2	50.974	6	50.084	1	2:30.299	2nd place, silver medalist(s)

== Short track speed skating ==
Latvia qualified two female short track speed skaters.

Women

Athlete	Event	Heats		Quarterfinal		Semifinal		Final	
Athlete	Event	Time	Rank	Time	Rank	Time	Rank	Time	Rank
Madara Gintere	500 m	49.949	4	Did not advance					
Madara Gintere	1000 m	1:47.534	4	Did not advance					
Madara Gintere	1500 m	—		2:46.802	6	Did not advance			
Kamilla Salmiņa	500 m	48.443	4	Did not advance					
Kamilla Salmiņa	1000 m	1:56.768	4	Did not advance					
Kamilla Salmiņa	1500 m	—		3:03.054	5	Did not advance			

== Skeleton ==
Latvia qualified five skeleton racers (two men and three women).

Athlete	Event	Run 1		Run 2		Total	
Athlete	Event	Time	Rank	Time	Rank	Time	Rank
Emīls Indriksons	Men's	52.40	1	52.26	1	1:44.66	1st place, gold medalist(s)
Dāvis Valdovskis	Men's	53.06	5	53.10	3	1:46.16	4
Marta Andžāne	Women's	55.90	10	54.49	1	1:50.39	5
Laura Lēģere	Women's	54.92	3	55.30	7	1:50.22	3rd place, bronze medalist(s)
Dārta Neimane	Women's	54.62	1	55.17	4	1:49.79	2nd place, silver medalist(s)

== Speed skating ==
Latvia qualified one male speed skater.

Distance

Athlete	Event	Time	Rank
Gustavs Vācietis	Men's 500 m	39.75	21
Gustavs Vācietis	Men's 1500 m	2:02.64	23

Mass Start

Athlete	Event	Semifinal			Final		
Athlete	Event	Points	Time	Rank	Points	Time	Rank
Gustavs Vācietis	Men's mass start	1	6:21.98	8 Q	0	5:41.02	16

== See also ==
- Latvia at the 2024 Summer Olympics
