= Poland at the 2024 Winter Youth Olympics =

- Flag of Poland
- IOC code: POL
- NOC: Polish Olympic Committee

in Gangwon, South Korea 19 January 2024 – 1 February 2024
- Competitors: 48 in 10 sports
- Flag bearers (opening): Michał Mikołajski & Kornelia Woźniak
- Flag bearer (closing): TBD
- Medals Ranked 20th: Gold 1 Silver 0 Bronze 2 Total 3

Winter Youth Olympics appearances
- 2012; 2016; 2020; 2024

Poland is scheduled to compete at the 2024 Winter Youth Olympics in Gangwon, South Korea, from 19 January to 1 February 2024, This will be Poland's fourth appearance at the Winter Youth Olympic Games, having competed at every Games since the inaugural edition in 2012.

The Polish delegation comprises 48 athletes (31 men and 17 women) competing in ten sports. Bobsledder Michał Mikołajski and short track speed skater Kornelia Woźniak were the country's flagbearers during the opening ceremony.

== Competitors ==
The following is the list of number of competitors (per gender) participating at the games per sport/discipline.

Sport	Men	Women	Total
Alpine skiing	1	1	2
Biathlon	3	3	6
Bobsleigh	1	0	1
Cross-country skiing	3	3	6
Ice hockey	13	0	13
Luge	3	4	7
Nordic combined	2	0	2
Short track speed skating	1	2	3
Ski jumping	2	2	4
Speed skating	2	2	4
Total	31	17	48

== Medalists ==
Medal	Name	Sport	Event	Date
Gold	Anna Falkowska	Short track speed skating	Women's 500 metres	22 January
Bronze	Łukasz Łukaszczyk	Ski jumping	Men's individual normal hill	20 January
Bronze	Hanna Mazur	Speed skating	Women's 1500 metres	23 January

== Alpine skiing ==
Poland qualified two alpine skiers (one per gender).

Men

Athlete	Event	Run 1		Run 2		Total	
Athlete	Event	Time	Rank	Time	Rank	Time	Rank
Stanisław Sarzyński	Super-G	—N/a				Did not finish	
Stanisław Sarzyński	Giant slalom	49.58	6	Did not finish			
Stanisław Sarzyński	Slalom	Did not finish					
Stanisław Sarzyński	Combined	56.02	22	55.80	10	1:51.82	14

Women

Athlete	Event	Run 1		Run 2		Total	
Athlete	Event	Time	Rank	Time	Rank	Time	Rank
Nikola Komorowska	Super-G	—N/a				55.52	17
Nikola Komorowska	Giant slalom	Did not finish					
Nikola Komorowska	Slalom	52.72	22	50.46	21	1:43.18	19
Nikola Komorowska	Combined	58.23	19	52.75	9	1:50.98	15

Mixed

Athlete	Event	Round of 16	Quarterfinals	Semifinals	Final / BM	
Athlete	Event	Opponent Result	Opponent Result	Opponent Result	Opponent Result	Rank
Nikola Komorowska; Stanisław Sarzyński	Parallel mixed team	Germany; L 2–2*	Did not advance			

== Biathlon ==
Poland qualified six biathletes (three per gender).

Men

Athlete	Event	Time	Misses	Rank
Grzegorz Galica	Sprint	22:37.1	4 (1+3)	9
Grzegorz Galica	Individual	45:30.8	8 (2+1+2+3)	17
Igor Kusztal	Sprint	25:11.0	6 (4+2)	60
Igor Kusztal	Individual	50:08.8	6 (3+0+1+2)	60
Michał Szułczyński	Sprint	Did not finish		
Michał Szułczyński	Individual	52:43.3	6 (1+1+1+3)	77

Women

Athlete	Event	Time	Misses	Rank
Gabriela Gąsienica	Sprint	25:24.8	5 (3+2)	63
Gabriela Gąsienica	Individual	43:47.6	4 (2+1+0+1)	40
Majka Germata	Sprint	24:21.5	3 (1+2)	48
Majka Germata	Individual	42:31.7	5 (0+1+0+4)	25
Amelia Liszka	Sprint	23:59.0	7 (3+4)	41
Amelia Liszka	Individual	41:04.1	4 (1+0+1+2)	18

Mixed

Athletes	Event	Time	Misses	Rank
Amelia Liszka; Grzegorz Galica	Single mixed relay	47:36.0	5+16	11
Majka Germata; Amelia Liszka; Igor Kusztal; Grzegorz Galica	Mixed relay	1:23:47.8	6+15	10

== Bobsleigh ==
Poland qualified one male bobsledder.

Athlete	Event	Run 1		Run 2		Total	
Athlete	Event	Time	Rank	Time	Rank	Time	Rank
Michał Mikołajski	Men's monobob	55.12	5	55.48	5	1:50.60	5

== Cross-country skiing ==
Poland qualified six cross-country skiers (three per gender).

Men

Athlete	Event	Qualification		Quarterfinal		Semifinal		Final	
Athlete	Event	Time	Rank	Time	Rank	Time	Rank	Time	Rank
Karol Stachoń	7.5 km classical	—N/a						22:29.8	45
Karol Stachoń	Sprint freestyle	3:23.16	46	Did not advance					
Antoni Żółkiewski	7.5 km classical	—N/a						22:00.0	41
Antoni Żółkiewski	Sprint freestyle	3:15.51	34	Did not advance					
Jan Zwatrzko	7.5 km classical	—N/a						21:41.4	37
Jan Zwatrzko	Sprint freestyle	3:12.33	27 Q	3:11.08	5	Did not advance			

Women

Athlete	Event	Qualification		Quarterfinal		Semifinal		Final	
Athlete	Event	Time	Rank	Time	Rank	Time	Rank	Time	Rank
Klaudia Radomyska	7.5 km classical	—N/a						24:54.5	33
Klaudia Radomyska	Sprint freestyle	3:45.92	25 Q	3:50.14	5	Did not advance			
Julia Rucka	7.5 km classical	—N/a						25:34.7	39
Julia Rucka	Sprint freestyle	3:53.87	38	Did not advance					
Laura Wantulok	7.5 km classical	—N/a						25:43.3	40
Laura Wantulok	Sprint freestyle	3:49.66	31	Did not advance					

Mixed

Athlete	Event	Time	Rank
Julia Rucka; Antoni Żółkiewski; Klaudia Radomyska; Jan Zwatrzko	Mixed relay	57:18.8	14

== Ice hockey ==
Poland qualified a men's 3x3 ice hockey team of 13 athletes.

Summary

Key:
- OT – Overtime
- GWS – Match decided by penalty-shootout

Team	Event	Group stage								Semifinal	Final	
Team	Event	Opposition Score	Opposition Score	Opposition Score	Opposition Score	Opposition Score	Opposition Score	Opposition Score	Rank	Opposition Score	Opposition Score	Rank
Poland	Men's 3x3 tournament	Kazakhstan; L 8–18	Chinese Taipei; W 10–8	Spain; W 10–5	Great Britain; W 17–7	Denmark; L 7–11	Latvia; L 3–8	Austria; W 3–2	5	Did not advance		

=== Men's 3x3 tournament ===
Preliminary round

Pos	Team	Pld	W	SOW	SOL	L	GF	GA	GD	Pts	Qualification
1	Latvia	7	7	0	0	0	119	31	+88	21	Semifinals
2	Austria	7	5	0	0	2	55	32	+23	15 (Note: Austria 7–5 Denmark)	Semifinals
3	Denmark	7	5	0	0	2	70	39	+31	15	Semifinals
4	Kazakhstan	7	4	0	0	3	93	59	+34	12 (Note: Poland 8–18 Kazakhstan)	Semifinals
5	Poland	7	4	0	0	3	58	59	−1	12	
6	Great Britain	7	2	0	0	5	46	97	−51	6	
7	Chinese Taipei	7	1	0	0	6	23	95	−72	3	
8	Spain	7	0	0	0	7	28	80	−52	0	

Source: Gangwon 2024
Notes:

20 January 2024; 12:00	Poland	8–18 (2–3, 4–5, 2–10)	Kazakhstan	Gangneung Hockey Centre

Game reference
Referees: (Canada) Mathieu Boudreau (Uzbekistan) David Prokofyev

21 January 2024; 09:00	Poland	10–8 (5–2, 3–1, 2–5)	Chinese Taipei	Gangneung Hockey Centre

Game reference
Referees: (United Kingdom) Joseph Sewell (Czech Republic) David Thuma

21 January 2024; 16:00	Poland	10–5 (2–2, 5–0, 3–3)	Spain	Gangneung Hockey Centre

Game reference
Referees: (South Korea) Lim Jun-seo (Czech Republic) David Thuma

22 January 2024; 10:30	Great Britain	7–17 (3–7, 1–4, 3–6)	Poland	Gangneung Hockey Centre

Game reference
Referees: (Canada) Mathieu Boudreau (United Kingdom) Joseph Sewell

22 January 2024; 17:30	Denmark	11–7 (5–2, 1–2, 5–3)	Poland	Gangneung Hockey Centre

Game reference
Referees: (Uzbekistan) David Prokofyev (United Kingdom) Joseph Sewell

23 January 2024; 09:00	Poland	3–8 (0–1, 2–1, 1–6)	Latvia	Gangneung Hockey Centre

Game reference
Referees: (South Korea) Lim Jun-seo (United Kingdom) Joseph Sewell

23 January 2024; 17:30	Austria	2–3 (1–0, 0–1, 1–2)	Poland	Gangneung Hockey Centre

Game reference
Referees: (Canada) Mathieu Boudreau (United Kingdom) Joseph Sewell

== Luge ==
Poland qualified seven lugers (three men and four women).

Men

Athlete	Event	Run 1		Run 2		Total	
Athlete	Event	Time	Rank	Time	Rank	Time	Rank
Michał Gancarczyk	Singles	48.047	15	48.117	16	1:36.164	15
Karol Warzybok; Cyprian Dybalski	Doubles	52.963	11	49.344	8	1:42.307	10

Women

Athlete	Event	Run 1		Run 2		Total	
Athlete	Event	Time	Rank	Time	Rank	Time	Rank
Oliwia Dawidowska	Singles	49.006	10	49.235	13	1:38.241	10
Emilia Nosal	Singles	48.504	5	48.886	8	1:37.390	7
Zuzanna Jędrzejczyk; Zuzanna Pieron	Doubles	49.449	6	49.396	5	1:38.845	6

Mixed

Athlete	Event	Women' singles		Men' singles		Doubles		Total	
Athlete	Event	Time	Rank	Time	Rank	Time	Rank	Time	Rank
Emilia Nosal; Michał Gancarczykl; Karol Warzybokl; Cyprian Dybalski	Team relay	49.257	4	51.611	9	52.660	7	2:33.528	6

== Nordic combined ==
Poland qualified two male Nordic combined skiers.

Athlete	Event	Ski jumping				Cross-country	
Athlete	Event	Distance	Points	Rank	Deficit	Time	Rank
Kacper Jarząbek	Men's normal hill/6 km	102.5	118.1	10	+1:32	15:22.7	10
Piotr Nowak	Men's normal hill/6 km	96.0	105.8	16	+2:21	16:45.8	19

== Short track speed skating ==
Poland qualified three short track speed skaters (one man and two women).

Men

Athlete	Event	Heats		Quarterfinal		Semifinal		Final	
Athlete	Event	Time	Rank	Time	Rank	Time	Rank	Time	Rank
Krzysztof Mądry	500 m	PEN		Did not advance					
Krzysztof Mądry	1000 m	1:56.256	3 ADV	1:30.492	4	Did not advance			
Krzysztof Mądry	1500 m	—N/a		3:05.255	4	Did not advance			

Women

Athlete	Event	Heats		Quarterfinal		Semifinal		Final	
Athlete	Event	Time	Rank	Time	Rank	Time	Rank	Time	Rank
Anna Falkowska	500 m	44.870	1 Q	44.545	1 Q	44.231	1 FA	44.314	1st place, gold medalist(s)
Anna Falkowska	1000 m	1:39.019	1 Q	1:36.283	2 Q	1:32.543	2 FA	1:41.897	4
Anna Falkowska	1500 m	—N/a		2:33.821	2 Q	PEN		Did not advance	
Kornelia Woźniak	500 m	45.021	1 Q	44.637	2 Q	44.403	3 FA	45.179	4
Kornelia Woźniak	1000 m	1:38.167	2 Q	1:33.350	4	Did not advance			
Kornelia Woźniak	1500 m	—N/a		2:28.759	5	Did not advance			

== Ski jumping ==
Poland qualified four ski jumpers (two per gender).

Individual

Athlete	Event	First round			Final			Total	
Athlete	Event	Distance	Points	Rank	Distance	Points	Rank	Points	Rank
Łukasz Łukaszczyk	Men's normal hill	105.0	113.9	1	108.5	95.8	10	209.7	3rd place, bronze medalist(s)
Kacper Tomasiak	Men's normal hill	104.5	112.5	2	95.0	90.5	12	203.0	7
Pola Bełtowska	Women's normal hill	81.5	61.2	16	86.5	70.2	14	131.4	14
Sara Tajner	Women's normal hill	68.5	28.9	25	77.0	47.8	22	76.7	22

Team

Athlete	Event	First round				Final				Total	
Athlete	Event	Distance	Points	Team points	Rank	Distance	Points	Team points	Rank	Points	Rank
Sara Tajner; Kacper Tomasiak; Pola Bełtowska; Łukasz Łukaszczyk	Mixed team	77.5; 107.0; 84.5; 101.5	53.4; 118.3; 69.0; 110.9	351.6	6	70.5; 107.0; 84.5; 102.0	46.2; 122.4; 74.3; 118.8	361.7	5	713.3	5

== Speed skating ==
Poland qualified four speed skaters (two per gender).

Men

Athlete	Event	Time	Rank
Krzysztof Galach	500 m	39.73	20
Krzysztof Galach	1500 m	2:01.88	18
Szymon Hostyński	500 m	37.32	7
Szymon Hostyński	1500 m	2:03.38	24

Women

Athlete	Event	Time	Rank
Zofia Braun	500 m	41.76	13
Zofia Braun	1500 m	2:09.90	12
Hanna Mazur	500 m	40.66	6
Hanna Mazur	1500 m	2:05.13	3rd place, bronze medalist(s)

Mass Start

Athlete	Event	Semifinal			Final		
Athlete	Event	Points	Time	Rank	Points	Time	Rank
Krzysztof Galach	Men's mass start	0	6:23.28	10	Did not advance		
Szymon Hostyński	Men's mass start	0	5:37.52	12	Did not advance		
Zofia Braun	Women's mass start	3	6:31.80	8 Q	5	5:55.20	4
Hanna Mazur	Women's mass start	3	6:27.52	8 Q	0	7:02.81	15

Mixed relay

Athlete	Event	Semifinal		Final	
Athlete	Event	Time	Rank	Time	Rank
Szymon Hostyński; Hanna Mazur	Mixed relay	3:23.02	9	Did not advance	

== See also ==
- Poland at the 2024 Summer Olympics
