= Great Britain at the 2024 Winter Youth Olympics =

- Flag of Great Britain
- IOC code: GBR
- NOC: British Olympic Committee

in Gangwon, South Korea 19 January 2024 – 1 February 2024
- Competitors: 39 in 11 sports
- Flag bearers (opening): Willem Murray & Tia Laurie
- Flag bearers (closing): Ashlie Slatter & Atl Ongay-Perez
- Officials: Eve Muirhead (Chef de Mission)
- Medals Ranked 9th: Gold 4 Silver 1 Bronze 1 Total 6

Winter Youth Olympics appearances (overview)
- 2012; 2016; 2020; 2024

Great Britain competed at the 2024 Winter Youth Olympics in Gangwon, South Korea, from January 19 to February 1, 2024. This was Great Britain's fourth appearance at the Winter Youth Olympic Games, having taken part in every Games since the inaugural edition in 2012.

The Great Britain team consisted of 39 athletes competing in 11 sports. Short track speed skater Willem Murray and curler Tia Laurie were the country's flagbearers during the opening ceremony.

== Competitors ==
The following is the list of number of competitors (per gender) participating at the games per sport/discipline.

Sport	Men	Women	Total
Alpine skiing	1	1	2
Biathlon	2	1	3
Bobsleigh	1	0	1
Cross-country skiing	1	2	3
Curling	3	3	6
Figure skating	2	1	3
Freestyle skiing	2	1	3
Ice hockey	13	0	13
Luge	0	1	1
Short track speed skating	2	0	2
Snowboarding	2	0	2
Total	29	10	39

== Medalists ==
Medal	Name	Sport	Event	Date
Gold	Zak Carrick-Smith	Alpine skiing	Men's combined	22 January
Gold	Zak Carrick-Smith	Alpine skiing	Men's slalom	25 January
Gold	Logan Carson; Tia Laurie; Archie Hyslop; Holly Burke	Curling	Mixed team	25 January
Gold	Callie Soutar; Ethan Brewster	Curling	Mixed doubles	1 February
Silver	Zak Carrick-Smith	Alpine skiing	Men's giant slalom	24 January
Bronze	Ashlie Slatter; Atl Ongay-Perez	Figure skating	Ice dance	30 January

== Alpine skiing ==
Athlete	Event	Run 1		Run 2		Total	
Athlete	Event	Time	Rank	Time	Rank	Time	Rank
Zak Carrick-Smith	Slalom	46.56	3	52.05	3	1:38.61	1st place, gold medalist(s)
Zak Carrick-Smith	Giant slalom	49.22	4	46.08	5	1:35.30	2nd place, silver medalist(s)
Zak Carrick-Smith	Super-G	—N/a				55.36	14
Zak Carrick-Smith	Combined	56.33	27	53.13	1	1:49.46	1st place, gold medalist(s)
Molly Butler	Slalom	52.36	19	49.14	10	1:41.50	12
Molly Butler	Giant slalom	49.78	11	54.24	14	1:44.02	10
Molly Butler	Super-G	—N/a				56.44	27
Molly Butler	Combined	58.82	27	52.47	6	1:51.29	16

Mixed

Athletes	Event	Round of 16	Quarterfinals	Semifinals	Final	
Athletes	Event	Opposition Result	Opposition Result	Opposition Result	Opposition Result	Rank
Molly Butler; Zak Carrick-Smith	Parallel team	Sweden; L 1–3	Did not advance			

== Biathlon ==
Athlete	Event	Time	Misses	Rank
Graham Benson	Sprint	24:27.2	0+3	44
Graham Benson	Individual	50:07.8	6+1	59
Tom Smith	Sprint	24:16.7	1+3	40
Tom Smith	Individual	52:22.5	5+6	74
Josie Clifford	Sprint	26:57.2	4+3	71
Josie Clifford	Individual	47:44.1	4+4	74

Mixed

Athletes	Event	Time	Misses	Rank
Josie Clifford; Graham Benson	Single mixed relay	53:23.1	6+18	25

== Bobsleigh ==
Athlete	Event	Run 1		Run 2		Total	
Athlete	Event	Time	Rank	Time	Rank	Time	Rank
Lennon Smith	Men's monobob	56.28	15	56.23	13	1:52.51	15

== Cross-country skiing ==
Great Britain qualified three cross-country skiers.

Boys

Athlete	Event	Qualification		Quarterfinal		Semifinal		Final	
Athlete	Event	Time	Rank	Time	Rank	Time	Rank	Time	Rank
Thomas Duncan	7.5 km classical	—N/a						22:41.1	47
Thomas Duncan	Sprint freestyle	3:22.73	45	Did not advance					

Girls

Athlete	Event	Qualification		Quarterfinal		Semifinal		Final	
Athlete	Event	Time	Rank	Time	Rank	Time	Rank	Time	Rank
Elspeth Cruickshank	7.5 km classical	—N/a						26:16.7	43
Elspeth Cruickshank	Sprint freestyle	4:00.42	44	Did not advance					
Sophie Forth	7.5 km classical	—N/a						27:17.6	50
Sophie Forth	Sprint freestyle	4:01.88	45	Did not advance					

== Curling ==
Great Britain qualified a mixed team and mixed doubles pair for a total of six athletes.

Summary

Team	Event	Group Stage								Quarterfinal	Semifinal	Final / BM	
Team	Event	Opposition Score	Opposition Score	Opposition Score	Opposition Score	Opposition Score	Opposition Score	Opposition Score	Rank	Opposition Score	Opposition Score	Opposition Score	Rank
Logan Carson; Tia Laurie; Archie Hyslop; Holly Burke	Mixed team	Denmark; W 7–6	Germany; L 4–7	Canada; W 6–3	South Korea; W 3–2	Italy; W 7–5	Switzerland; W 8–3	Brazil; W 9–4	1 Q	Bye	Switzerland; W 8–6	Denmark; W 7–5	1st place, gold medalist(s)
Callie Soutar; Ethan Brewster	Mixed doubles	Nigeria; W 18–0	South Korea; L 2–11	Czech Republic; W 8–3	Hungary; W 8–4	Canada; W 7–6	—N/a		1 Q	Germany; W 7–5	Sweden; W 6–5	Denmark; W 7–6	1st place, gold medalist(s)

=== Mixed team ===
Group B	Skip	W	L	W–L	PF	PA	EW	EL	BE	SE	DSC
Great Britain	Logan Carson	6	1	–	44	30	26	21	4	7	51.75
Denmark	Jacob Schmidt	5	2	–	48	28	27	20	2	9	34.70
Switzerland	Nathan Dryburgh	4	3	2–0	52	35	25	23	5	7	39.96
Italy	Andrea Gilli	4	3	1–1	46	38	29	23	3	7	50.58
South Korea	Kim Dae-hyun	4	3	0–2	48	33	24	22	3	8	109.88
Canada	Nathan Gray	3	4	–	40	34	24	20	3	11	35.43
Brazil	Pedro Ribeiro	1	6	1–0	17	81	13	31	0	2	103.39
Germany	Lukas Jäger	1	6	0–1	30	46	19	27	2	5	68.51

Round robin

Draw 1

Saturday, January 20, 14:00

Sheet C	1	2	3	4	5	6	7	8	Final
Denmark (Schmidt)	0	2	0	0	2	0	2	0	6
Great Britain (Carson) 🔨	2	0	1	1	0	1	0	2	7

Draw 2

Sunday, January 21, 10:00

Sheet D	1	2	3	4	5	6	7	8	Final
Germany (Jäger) 🔨	2	0	0	0	2	0	2	1	7
Great Britain (Carson)	0	0	1	1	0	2	0	0	4

Draw 3

Sunday, January 21, 18:00

Sheet B	1	2	3	4	5	6	7	8	Final
Great Britain (Carson) 🔨	0	0	0	3	1	0	2	X	6
Canada (Gray)	1	0	1	0	0	1	0	X	3

Draw 4

Monday, January 22, 14:00

Sheet D	1	2	3	4	5	6	7	8	Final
Great Britain (Carson) 🔨	1	0	0	0	0	1	0	1	3
South Korea (Kim)	0	0	1	0	0	0	1	0	2

Draw 5

Tuesday, January 23, 10:00

Sheet A	1	2	3	4	5	6	7	8	Final
Italy (Gilli) 🔨	2	0	1	0	1	0	1	0	5
Great Britain (Carson)	0	2	0	2	0	2	0	1	7

Draw 6

Tuesday, January 23, 18:00

Sheet B	1	2	3	4	5	6	7	8	Final
Switzerland (Dryburgh) 🔨	0	0	0	2	1	0	0	0	3
Great Britain (Carson)	0	1	1	0	0	2	0	4	8

Draw 7

Wednesday, January 24, 13:00

Sheet A	1	2	3	4	5	6	7	8	Final
Great Britain (Carson) 🔨	1	0	3	1	0	4	0	X	9
Brazil (Ribeiro)	0	1	0	0	1	0	2	X	4

Semifinal

Thursday, January 25, 9:00

Sheet C	1	2	3	4	5	6	7	8	Final
Great Britain (Carson) 🔨	3	0	2	0	1	0	2	0	8
Switzerland (Dryburgh)	0	1	0	1	0	3	0	1	6

Gold medal game

Thursday, January 25, 18:00

Sheet B	1	2	3	4	5	6	7	8	9	Final
Denmark (Schmidt)	0	4	0	0	0	0	0	1	0	5
Great Britain (Carson) 🔨	1	0	1	1	1	0	1	0	2	7

=== Mixed doubles ===
Group A	W	L	W–L	DSC
Great Britain	4	1	1–0	40.06
Czech Republic	4	1	0–1	42.84
Canada	3	2	–	54.69
Hungary	2	3	1–0	89.06
South Korea	2	3	0–1	38.09
Nigeria	0	5	–	168.42

Round robin

Draw 2

Saturday, January 27, 10:00

Sheet C	1	2	3	4	5	6	7	8	Final
Great Britain (Soutar / Brewster) 🔨	5	2	1	5	3	2	X	X	18
Nigeria (Akinsanya / Daniel)	0	0	0	0	0	0	X	X	0

Draw 7

Sunday, January 28, 18:00

Sheet C	1	2	3	4	5	6	7	8	Final
South Korea (Lee / Lee) 🔨	1	2	2	1	0	3	2	X	11
Great Britain (Soutar / Brewster)	0	0	0	0	2	0	0	X	2

Draw 9

Monday, January 29, 14:00

Sheet B	1	2	3	4	5	6	7	8	Final
Great Britain (Soutar / Brewster) 🔨	0	0	0	1	1	1	1	4	8
Czech Republic (Zelingrová / Bláha)	1	1	1	0	0	0	0	0	3

Draw 11

Tuesday, January 30, 10:00

Sheet A	1	2	3	4	5	6	7	8	Final
Great Britain (Soutar / Brewster) 🔨	4	0	2	1	0	1	0	X	8
Hungary (Nagy / Kárász)	0	1	0	0	2	0	1	X	4

Draw 15

Wednesday, January 31, 12:30

Sheet D	1	2	3	4	5	6	7	8	Final
Canada (Locke / Perry) 🔨	0	2	0	0	2	0	2	0	6
Great Britain (Soutar / Brewster)	1	0	1	1	0	1	0	3	7

Quarterfinal

Wednesday, January 31, 19:00

Sheet B	1	2	3	4	5	6	7	8	Final
Great Britain (Soutar / Brewster) 🔨	2	0	2	0	0	2	0	1	7
Germany (Sutor / Angrick)	0	1	0	1	1	0	2	0	5

Semifinal

Thursday, February 1, 9:00

Sheet C	1	2	3	4	5	6	7	8	Final
Great Britain (Soutar / Brewster)	1	1	1	0	0	2	0	1	6
Sweden (Roxin / Meyerson) 🔨	0	0	0	2	1	0	2	0	5

Gold medal game

Thursday, February 1, 16:00

Sheet B	1	2	3	4	5	6	7	8	Final
Great Britain (Soutar / Brewster)	2	1	0	0	3	0	1	0	7
Denmark (Schmidt / Schmidt) 🔨	0	0	2	2	0	1	0	1	6

== Figure skating ==
Athlete	Event	SP		FS		Total	
Athlete	Event	Points	Rank	Points	Rank	Points	Rank
Tao MacRae	Boys' singles	59.49	9	112.12	12	171.61	12
Atl Ongay-Perez; Ashlie Slatter	Ice dance	50.91	7	89.25	2	140.16	3rd place, bronze medalist(s)

== Freestyle skiing ==
Ski cross

Athlete	Event	Group heats		Semifinal	Final
Athlete	Event	Points	Rank	Position	Position
Charlie Cooper	Men's ski cross	8	14	Did not advance	
Jake Dade	Men's ski cross	16	4 Q	3 FB	7
Axel Rose Green	Women's ski cross	18	3 Q	3 FB	6
Axel Rose Green; Jake Dade	Mixed team ski cross	—N/a	2 Q	3 FB	6

== Ice hockey ==
Great Britain qualified a team of thirteen ice hockey players (eleven skaters and two goaltenders) for the men's 3-on-3 ice hockey tournament.

Squad

Daniel Meyers served as head coach and Matthew Lock was assistant coach.

On the eve of the Games, goaltender Sam Ellis withdrew due to injury and was replaced by Harry Thomas.

- Leilo Bellamy
- Jonas Bennett
- Robbie Henderson
- Ethan Lock
- Kingston McKenzie
- Joel Meyers – C
- Sam Miller
- Ricards Misins
- Joshua Seeback
- Daragh Spawforth – A
- Harry Thomas
- Harry Vant – A
- Tiago Worsfold

Summary

Key:
- GWS – Game winning shots

Team	Event	Group stage								Semifinal	Final	
Team	Event	Opponent Score	Opponent Score	Opponent Score	Opponent Score	Opponent Score	Opponent Score	Opponent Score	Rank	Opponent Score	Opponent Score	Rank
Great Britain	Men's 3-on-3 tournament	Austria; L 3–12	Latvia; L 1–24	Denmark; L 4–14	Poland; L 7–17	Spain; W 8–5	Chinese Taipei; W 10–3	Kazakhstan; L 13–22	6	Did not advance		

=== Men's 3-on-3 tournament ===
Preliminary round

Pos	Team	Pld	W	SOW	SOL	L	GF	GA	GD	Pts	Qualification
1	Latvia	7	7	0	0	0	119	31	+88	21	Semifinals
2	Austria	7	5	0	0	2	55	32	+23	15 (Note: Austria 7–5 Denmark)	Semifinals
3	Denmark	7	5	0	0	2	70	39	+31	15	Semifinals
4	Kazakhstan	7	4	0	0	3	93	59	+34	12 (Note: Poland 8–18 Kazakhstan)	Semifinals
5	Poland	7	4	0	0	3	58	59	−1	12	
6	Great Britain	7	2	0	0	5	46	97	−51	6	
7	Chinese Taipei	7	1	0	0	6	23	95	−72	3	
8	Spain	7	0	0	0	7	28	80	−52	0	

Source: Gangwon 2024
Notes:

20 January 2024; 12:00	Austria	12–3 (1–1, 4–2, 7–0)	Great Britain	Gangneung Hockey Centre

Game reference
Referees: (South Korea) Lim Jun-seo (Czech Republic) David Thuma

21 January 2024; 09:00	Great Britain	1–24 (1–8, 0–6, 0–10)	Latvia	Gangneung Hockey Centre

Game reference
Referees: (Canada) Mathieu Boudreau (Uzbekistan) David Prokofyev

21 January 2024; 16:00	Denmark	14–4 (3–2, 5–0, 6–2)	Great Britain	Gangneung Hockey Centre

Game reference
Referees: (Uzbekistan) David Prokofyev (United Kingdom) Joseph Sewell

22 January 2024; 10:30	Great Britain	7–17 (3–7, 1–4, 3–6)	Poland	Gangneung Hockey Centre

Game reference
Referees: (Canada) Mathieu Boudreau (United Kingdom) Joseph Sewell

22 January 2024; 17:30	Great Britain	8–5 (0–1, 4–3, 4–1)	Spain	Gangneung Hockey Centre

Game reference
Referees: (South Korea) Lim Jun-seo (Czech Republic) David Thuma

23 January 2024; 09:00	Chinese Taipei	3–10 (1–2, 2–1, 0–7)	Great Britain	Gangneung Hockey Centre

Game reference
Referees: (Uzbekistan) David Prokofyev (Czech Republic) David Thuma

23 January 2024; 17:30	Kazakhstan	22–13 (6–1, 7–7, 9–5)	Great Britain	Gangneung Hockey Centre

Game reference
Referees: (Uzbekistan) David Prokofyev (Czech Republic) David Thuma

== Luge ==
Great Britain qualified one female luger.

Athlete	Event	Run 1		Run 2		Total	
Athlete	Event	Time	Rank	Time	Rank	Time	Rank
Kaia Hatton	Girls' singles	49.312	16	49.215	12	1:38.527	13

== Short track speed skating ==
Boys

Athlete	Event	Heats		Quarterfinal		Semifinal		Final	
Athlete	Event	Time	Rank	Time	Rank	Time	Rank	Time	Rank
Willem Murray	500 m	42.917	2 Q	42.565	4	Did not advance			
Willem Murray	1000 m	1:29.544	2 Q	1:27.931	3 q	1:27.908	3 QB	1:30.229	8
Willem Murray	1500 m	—N/a		2:18.050	3 Q	2:33.896	3 QB	2:41.906	10
Freddie Polak	500 m	42.909	3	Did not advance					
Freddie Polak	1000 m	1:32.775	3	Did not advance					
Freddie Polak	1500 m	—N/a		PEN	–	Did not advance			

== Snowboarding ==
Halfpipe, Slopestyle, & Big Air

Athlete	Event	Qualification				Final				
Athlete	Event	Run 1	Run 2	Best	Rank	Run 1	Run 2	Run 3	Best	Rank
Teiva Hamaini	Men's big air	40.00	39.25	40.00	17	Did not advance				
Teiva Hamaini	Men's slopestyle	33.75	18.25	33.75	14	Did not advance				
Siddhartha Ullah	Men's halfpipe	9.50	46.50	46.50	13	Did not advance				

== See also ==
- Great Britain at the 2024 Summer Olympics
