= 2024 Winter Youth Olympics medal table =

The 2024 Winter Youth Olympics medal table is a list of National Olympic Committees (NOCs) ranked by the number of gold medals won by their athletes during the 2024 Winter Youth Olympics, held in Gangwon, South Korea, from 19 January to 1 February 2024.

== Accomplishments ==
A total of five countries won their first ever Winter Youth Olympics medal: Brazil, Denmark, Thailand, Tunisia and Turkey.

On January 20, snowboarder Zion Bethônico earned the bronze medal in the men's snowboard cross event, becoming the first athlete from Brazil to win a Winter Olympic medal. This was only the second Winter Youth Olympics medal by a tropical nation, after Colombia's silver in 2020.

On January 21, short track speed skater Muhammed Bozdağ earned the silver medal in the men's 1000 metres, becoming the first Turkish athlete to win a Winter Olympic medal outside of mixed-NOC competition.

On January 22, bobsledder Agnese Campeol earned the silver medal in the women's monobob, becoming the first Thai and Southeast Asian athlete to win a Winter Olympic medal. In the same event, bobsledder Maja Voigt won the gold medal, Denmark's first Winter Youth Olympics medal outside of mixed-NOC competition.

On January 23, bobsledder Jonathan Lourimi earned the silver medal in the men's monobob, becoming the first Tunisian athlete to win a Winter Youth Olympic medal. This was only the second Winter Youth Olympics medal by a North African nation, after Morocco's historic gold in 2012.

== Medal table ==
By default, the table is ordered by the number of gold medals the athletes from a nation have won (in this context, a "nation" is an entity represented by a National Olympic Committee). The number of silver medals is taken into consideration next and then the number of bronze medals. If nations are still tied, equal ranking is given and they are listed alphabetically.

* Host nation (South Korea)

Rank	Nation	Gold	Silver	Bronze	Total
1	Italy	11	3	4	18
2	Germany	9	5	6	20
3	South Korea*	7	6	4	17
4	France	7	5	6	18
5	China	6	9	3	18
6	United States	5	11	5	21
7	Austria	5	6	5	16
8	Sweden	4	4	3	11
9	Great Britain	4	1	1	6
10	Japan	3	4	8	15
11	Canada	3	2	1	6
12	Netherlands	3	1	1	5
13	Finland	3	0	4	7
14	Latvia	2	3	1	6
14	Slovenia	2	3	1	6
16	Denmark	1	3	0	4
17	New Zealand	1	2	4	7
18	Switzerland	1	1	7	9
19	Czech Republic	1	1	2	4
20	Kazakhstan	1	0	2	3
20	Poland	1	0	2	3
22	Hungary	1	0	1	2
23	Norway	0	4	3	7
24	Australia	0	2	1	3
25	Slovakia	0	1	2	3
26	Ukraine	0	1	1	2
27	Thailand	0	1	0	1
27	Tunisia	0	1	0	1
27	Turkey	0	1	0	1
30	Brazil	0	0	1	1
30	Romania	0	0	1	1
30	Spain	0	0	1	1
Totals (32 entries)		81	81	81	243

Source: Gangwon 2024
