= Ice hockey at the 2024 Winter Youth Olympics – Men's 3x3 tournament =

2024 Winter Youth Olympics men's 3x3 tournament
Tournament details
- Host country: South Korea
- Venue(s): 1 (in 1 host city)
- Dates: 20–25 January
- Teams: 8

Final positions
- Champions: Latvia (1st title)
- Runners-up: Denmark
- Third place: Kazakhstan
- Fourth place: Austria

Tournament statistics
- Games played: 32
- Goals scored: 548 (17.13 per game)

The men's 3x3 ice hockey tournament at the 2024 Winter Youth Olympics was held from 20 to 25 January at the Gangneung Hockey Centre in Gangneung, South Korea.

== Officials ==
Five on-ice officials were selected for the tournament.

- (Canada) Mathieu Boudreau
- (South Korea) Lim Jun Seo
- (Uzbekistan) David Prokofyev
- (United Kingdom) Joseph Sewell
- (Czech Republic) David Thuma

International Ice Hockey Federation representative Raeto Raffainer of Switzerland was the tournament chairperson. Thai sports administrator Khunying Patama Leeswadtrakul presented medals at the victory ceremony.

== Teams ==
| No | Pos | Austria | Denmark | Great Britain | Kazakhstan |
|---|---|---|---|---|---|
| 2 | P | Paul Vaschauner | William Brix | Kingston McKenzie | Rasul Tursynov |
| 3 | P | Jonathan Oschgan | Max Kramer | Jonas Bennett | Bexultan Makysh |
| 4 | P | Marc Hudritsch | Martinus Schioldan | Samuel Miller | Tair Bigarinov |
| 5 | P | Ben Öfner | Mikkel Bjerre | Robert Henderson | Roman Michurov |
| 6 | P | Luc van Ee | Luca Bærentsen | Harry Vant | Anuar Akhmetzhanov |
| 7 | P | Benedikt Hengelmüller | Andreas Klitaa Jørgensen | Joel Meyers | Arman Tolen |
| 8 | P | Paul Sintschnig | Emil Jakobsen | Leilo Bellamy | Temirlan Aiboluly |
| 9 | P | Rafael Wagnsonner | Gustav Remler-Jensen | Ethan Lock | Yegor Kravchenko |
| 10 | P | Paul Schuster | Lucas Althof | Richard Misins | Zhakhanger Tleukhan |
| 11 | P | Luca Fischer | Casey Silverman | Daragh Spawforth | Adilkhan Sattar |
| 12 | P | Simon Cseh | Mikkel Poulsen | Joshua Seeback | Matvey Reshetko |
| 30 | GK | Martin Haim | Frederik Bech | Tiago Worsfold | Arseniy Kuchkovskiy |
| 31 | GK | Gabriel Lemberger | Anton Wilde | Harry Thomas | Nikita Kulakov |
| No | Pos | Latvia | Poland | Spain | Chinese Taipei |
| 2 | P | Makss Mihailovs | Jan Matera | Iker Ruiz de Galarreta | Chan Shun-Yu |
| 3 | P | Timurs Mališevs | Aleksander Wanat | Andrey Garkusha | Chen Chun-Yu |
| 4 | P | Leonards Grundmanis | Adrian Strojny | Enzo Franco | Wu Yu-Chen |
| 5 | P | Herberts Laugalis | Radosław Kot | Alan Lara | Wu Kai-Zhen |
| 6 | P | Fēlikss Paurs | Borys Dawid | Nicolás de Julián | Peng Li-Hung |
| 7 | P | Kristers Obuks | Adam Krajewski | Iván Román | Yang Ting-Chia |
| 8 | P | Martins Klaucāns | Adrian Bagienko | Carlos Rodríguez | Chen Ting-Shiu |
| 9 | P | Ričards Rutkis | Mateusz Myszka | Ibai Pastor | Wang Kuan-Yao |
| 10 | P | Olivers Mūrnieks | Artur Fraszko | Oriol Pérez | Chi Kai-Yuan |
| 11 | P | Martins Bārtulis | Wiktor Tańczyk | Pablo Mazón | Chen Shou-Yi |
| 12 | P | Daniels Reidzāns | Kajetan Domalewski | Araitz Sande | Chen Chun-Lin |
| 30 | GK | Patriks Plūmiņš | Bartosz Kowalik | Samuel Nieto | Chiu Hsien-Cheng |
| 31 | GK | Roberts Kravalis | Kacper Rydzoń | Íñigo Martínez | Chen Lilong |

== Preliminary round ==
All times are local (UTC+9).

| Pos | Team | Pld | W | SOW | SOL | L | GF | GA | GD | Pts | Qualification |
|---|---|---|---|---|---|---|---|---|---|---|---|
| 1 | Latvia | 7 | 7 | 0 | 0 | 0 | 119 | 31 | +88 | 21 | Semifinals |
| 2 | Austria | 7 | 5 | 0 | 0 | 2 | 55 | 32 | +23 | 15 (Note: Austria 7–5 Denmark) | Semifinals |
| 3 | Denmark | 7 | 5 | 0 | 0 | 2 | 70 | 39 | +31 | 15 | Semifinals |
| 4 | Kazakhstan | 7 | 4 | 0 | 0 | 3 | 93 | 59 | +34 | 12 (Note: Poland 8–18 Kazakhstan) | Semifinals |
| 5 | Poland | 7 | 4 | 0 | 0 | 3 | 58 | 59 | −1 | 12 | |
| 6 | Great Britain | 7 | 2 | 0 | 0 | 5 | 46 | 97 | −51 | 6 | |
| 7 | Chinese Taipei | 7 | 1 | 0 | 0 | 6 | 23 | 95 | −72 | 3 | |
| 8 | Spain | 7 | 0 | 0 | 0 | 7 | 28 | 80 | −52 | 0 | |

Source: Gangwon 2024
Notes:

| 20 January 2024; 12:00 | Poland | 8–18 (2–3, 4–5, 2–10) | Kazakhstan | Gangneung Hockey Centre |

Game reference
| Referees: (Canada) Mathieu Boudreau (Uzbekistan) David Prokofyev |

| 20 January 2024; 12:00 | Austria | 12–3 (1–1, 4–2, 7–0) | Great Britain | Gangneung Hockey Centre |

Game reference
| Referees: (South Korea) Lim Jun-seo (Czech Republic) David Thuma |

| 20 January 2024; 13:30 | Latvia | 24–5 (9–2, 7–2, 8–1) | Spain | Gangneung Hockey Centre |

Game reference
| Referees: (Uzbekistan) David Prokofyev (Czech Republic) David Thuma |

| 20 January 2024; 13:30 | Chinese Taipei | 2–11 (0–2, 1–4, 1–5) | Denmark | Gangneung Hockey Centre |

Game reference
| Referees: (Canada) Mathieu Boudreau (South Korea) Lim Jun-seo |

| 21 January 2024; 09:00 | Poland | 10–8 (5–2, 3–1, 2–5) | Chinese Taipei | Gangneung Hockey Centre |

Game reference
| Referees: (United Kingdom) Joseph Sewell (Czech Republic) David Thuma |

| 21 January 2024; 09:00 | Great Britain | 1–24 (1–8, 0–6, 0–10) | Latvia | Gangneung Hockey Centre |

Game reference
| Referees: (Canada) Mathieu Boudreau (Uzbekistan) David Prokofyev |

| 21 January 2024; 10:30 | Kazakhstan | 8–9 (4–4, 4–4, 0–1) | Austria | Gangneung Hockey Centre |

Game reference
| Referees: (South Korea) Lim Jun-seo (United Kingdom) Joseph Sewell |

| 21 January 2024; 10:30 | Denmark | 15–2 (4–1, 5–0, 6–1) | Spain | Gangneung Hockey Centre |

Game reference
| Referees: (Canada) Mathieu Boudreau (Czech Republic) David Thuma |

| 21 January 2024; 16:00 | Denmark | 14–4 (3–2, 5–0, 6–2) | Great Britain | Gangneung Hockey Centre |

Game reference
| Referees: (Uzbekistan) David Prokofyev (United Kingdom) Joseph Sewell |

| 21 January 2024; 16:00 | Poland | 10–5 (2–2, 5–0, 3–3) | Spain | Gangneung Hockey Centre |

Game reference
| Referees: (South Korea) Lim Jun-seo (Czech Republic) David Thuma |

| 21 January 2024; 17:30 | Latvia | 15–11 (5–6, 6–0, 4–5) | Kazakhstan | Gangneung Hockey Centre |

Game reference
| Referees: (Canada) Mathieu Boudreau (United Kingdom) Joseph Sewell |

| 21 January 2024; 17:30 | Austria | 18–1 (3–1, 8–1, 7–0) | Chinese Taipei | Gangneung Hockey Centre |

Game reference
| Referees: (South Korea) Lim Jun-seo (Uzbekistan) David Prokofyev |

| 22 January 2024; 09:00 | Spain | 3–4 (0–1, 1–2, 2–1) | Austria | Gangneung Hockey Centre |

Game reference
| Referees: (Canada) Mathieu Boudreau (United Kingdom) Joseph Sewell |

| 22 January 2024; 09:00 | Kazakhstan | 6–8 (3–1, 1–3, 2–4) | Denmark | Gangneung Hockey Centre |

Game reference
| Referees: (Uzbekistan) David Prokofyev (Czech Republic) David Thuma |

| 22 January 2024; 10:30 | Great Britain | 7–17 (3–7, 1–4, 3–6) | Poland | Gangneung Hockey Centre |

Game reference
| Referees: (Canada) Mathieu Boudreau (United Kingdom) Joseph Sewell |

| 22 January 2024; 10:30 | Latvia | 28–2 (14–1, 9–0, 5–1) | Chinese Taipei | Gangneung Hockey Centre |

Game reference
| Referees: (South Korea) JunSeo Lim (Czech Republic) David Thuma |

| 22 January 2024; 16:00 | Latvia | 9–3 (2–0, 3–0, 4–3) | Austria | Gangneung Hockey Centre |

Game reference
| Referees: (Uzbekistan) David Prokofyev (United Kingdom) Joseph Sewell |

| 22 January 2024; 16:00 | Chinese Taipei | 2–14 (1–7, 1–1, 0–6) | Kazakhstan | Gangneung Hockey Centre |

Game reference
| Referees: (Canada) Mathieu Boudreau (South Korea) Lim Jun-seo |

| 22 January 2024; 17:30 | Great Britain | 8–5 (0–1, 4–3, 4–1) | Spain | Gangneung Hockey Centre |

Game reference
| Referees: (South Korea) Lim Jun-seo (Czech Republic) David Thuma |

| 22 January 2024; 17:30 | Denmark | 11–7 (5–2, 1–2, 5–3) | Poland | Gangneung Hockey Centre |

Game reference
| Referees: (Uzbekistan) David Prokofyev (United Kingdom) Joseph Sewell |

| 23 January 2024; 09:00 | Poland | 3–8 (0–1, 2–1, 1–6) | Latvia | Gangneung Hockey Centre |

Game reference
| Referees: (South Korea) Lim Jun-seo (United Kingdom) Joseph Sewell |

| 23 January 2024; 09:00 | Chinese Taipei | 3–10 (1–2, 2–1, 0–7) | Great Britain | Gangneung Hockey Centre |

Game reference
| Referees: (Uzbekistan) David Prokofyev (Czech Republic) David Thuma |

| 23 January 2024; 10:30 | Spain | 4–14 (1–2, 1–7, 2–5) | Kazakhstan | Gangneung Hockey Centre |

Game reference
| Referees: (South Korea) Lim Jun-seo (Czech Republic) David Thuma |

| 23 January 2024; 10:30 | Austria | 7–5 (2–1, 2–1, 3–3) | Denmark | Gangneung Hockey Centre |

Game reference
| Referees: (Canada) Mathieu Boudreau (United Kingdom) Joseph Sewell |

| 23 January 2024; 16:00 | Denmark | 6–11 (3–4, 1–4, 2–3) | Latvia | Gangneung Hockey Centre |

Game reference
| Referees: (Canada) Mathieu Boudreau (Czech Republic) David Thuma |

| 23 January 2024; 16:00 | Spain | 4–5 (2–1, 0–2, 2–2) | Chinese Taipei | Gangneung Hockey Centre |

Game reference
| Referees: (South Korea) Lim Jun-seo (Uzbekistan) David Prokofyev |

| 23 January 2024; 17:30 | Kazakhstan | 22–13 (6–1, 7–7, 9–5) | Great Britain | Gangneung Hockey Centre |

Game reference
| Referees: (Uzbekistan) David Prokofyev (Czech Republic) David Thuma |

| 23 January 2024; 17:30 | Austria | 2–3 (1–0, 0–1, 1–2) | Poland | Gangneung Hockey Centre |

Game reference
| Referees: (Canada) Mathieu Boudreau (United Kingdom) Joseph Sewell |

== Playoff round ==
Semifinals
24 January
Latvia | 19
Kazakhstan | 5
24 January
Austria | 3
Denmark | 5

Final
25 January
Latvia | 10
Denmark | 3
Third place
25 January
Austria | 5
Kazakhstan | 6

=== Semifinals ===
| 24 January 2024; 12:00 | Latvia | 19–5 (9–1, 3–2, 7–2) | Kazakhstan | Gangneung Hockey Centre |

Game reference
| Referees: (Canada) Mathieu Boudreau (Uzbekistan) David Prokofyev |

| 24 January 2024; 13:30 | Austria | 3–5 (2–1, 0–2, 1–2) | Denmark | Gangneung Hockey Centre |

Game reference
| Referees: (United Kingdom) Joseph Sewell (Czech Republic) David Thuma |

=== Bronze medal game ===
| 25 January 2024; 12:00 | Austria | 5–6 (1–4, 2–1, 2–1) | Kazakhstan | Gangneung Hockey Centre |

Game reference
| Referees: (South Korea) Lim Jun-seo (United Kingdom) Joseph Sewell |

=== Gold medal game ===
| 25 January 2024; 14:00 | Latvia | 10–3 (6–1, 2–0, 2–2) | Denmark | Gangneung Hockey Centre |

Game reference
| Referees: (Canada) Mathieu Boudreau (Czech Republic) David Thuma |
