= Spain at the 2024 Winter Youth Olympics =

- Flag of Spain
- IOC code: ESP
- NOC: Spanish Olympic Committee

in Gangwon, South Korea 19 January 2024 – 1 February 2024
- Competitors: 28 in 9 sports
- Flag bearers (opening): Rodrigo Azabal Estaun & Clara Aznar Gil
- Flag bearer (closing): TBD
- Medals Ranked 30th: Gold 0 Silver 0 Bronze 1 Total 1

Winter Youth Olympics appearances (overview)
- 2012; 2016; 2020; 2024

Spain is scheduled to compete at the 2024 Winter Youth Olympics in Gangwon, South Korea, from 19 January to 1 February 2024, This will be Spain's fourth appearance at the Winter Youth Olympic Games, having competed at every Games since the inaugural edition in 2012.

The Spanish delegation comprises 29 athletes (21 men and 8 women) competing in nine sports. Skeleton athlete Clara Aznar Gil and biathlete Rodrigo Azabal Estaun were the country's flagbearers during the opening ceremony.were the country's flagbearers during the opening ceremony.

== Competitors ==
The following is the list of number of competitors (per gender) participating at the games per sport/discipline.

Sport	Men	Women	Total
Alpine skiing	0	1	1
Biathlon	1	1	2
Cross-country skiing	1	1	2
Figure skating	1	1	2
Freestyle skiing	1	0	1
Ice hockey	13	0	13
Skeleton	0	1	1
Snowboarding	1	1	2
Speed skating	2	2	4
Total	20	8	28

== Medalists ==
Medal	Name	Sport	Event	Date
Bronze	Carolina Shan Campillo; Pau Vilella	Figure skating	Pair skating	29 January

== Alpine skiing ==
Spain qualified two alpine skiers (one per gender).

Athlete	Event	Run 1		Run 2		Total	
Athlete	Event	Time	Rank	Time	Rank	Time	Rank
Maria Abad Antuña	Women's super-G	—N/a				56.16	22
Maria Abad Antuña	Women's giant slalom	51.73	22	54.58	17	1:46.31	17
Maria Abad Antuña	Women's slalom	52.88	23	49.09	7	1:41.97	15
Maria Abad Antuña	Women's combined	58.59	25	53.44	15	1:52.03	19

== Biathlon ==
Athlete	Event	Time	Misses	Rank
Rodrigo Azabal	Men's sprint	24:46.8	6 (5+1)	53
Rodrigo Azabal	Men's individual	49:31.8	11 (3+3+1+4)	55
Cristina Lanau	Women's sprint	24:06.9	4 (2+2)	43
Cristina Lanau	Women's individual	47:30.5	9 (1+3+3+2)	73
Cristina Lanau; Rodrigo Azabal	Single mixed relay	53:23.5	10+19	26

== Cross-country skiing ==
Spain qualified two cross-country skiers (one per gender).

Men

Athlete	Event	Qualification		Quarterfinal		Semifinal		Final	
Athlete	Event	Time	Rank	Time	Rank	Time	Rank	Time	Rank
Peio Anarbe	7.5 km classical	—N/a						21:03.6	25
Peio Anarbe	Sprint freestyle	3:08.70	14 Q	3:33.29	6	Did not advance			

Women

Athlete	Event	Qualification		Quarterfinal		Semifinal		Final	
Athlete	Event	Time	Rank	Time	Rank	Time	Rank	Time	Rank
Naia González	7.5 km classical	—N/a						25:25.8	37
Naia González	Sprint freestyle	3:51.16	35	Did not advance					

== Figure skating ==
Athlete	Event	SP/SD		FS/FD		Total	
Athlete	Event	Points	Rank	Points	Rank	Points	Rank
Carolina Shan Campillo; Pau Vilella	Pairs	31.52	3	62.51	2	94.03	3rd place, bronze medalist(s)

== Freestyle skiing ==
Dual moguls

Athlete	Event	Group Stage						Semifinals	Final / BM	
Athlete	Event	Opposition Result	Opposition Result	Opposition Result	Opposition Result	Points	Rank	Opposition Result	Opposition Result	Rank
Anton Verdaguer Forn	Men's dual moguls	Zvalený (CZE); W 3–2	Gay (FRA); W 3–2	Moberg (SWE); DNF 1–3	Cohen (USA); W 3–2	10	3	Did not advance		

== Ice hockey ==
Spain qualified a team of thirteen ice hockey players for the men's 3-on-3 tournament.

Roster

Jorge Calvo Vinacua served as head coach.

- Nicolás de Julián
- Enzo Franco
- Andrey Garkusha – A
- Alan Lara
- Íñigo Martínez
- Pablo Mazón
- Samuel Nieto
- Ibai Pastor
- Oriol Pérez
- Carlos Rodríguez
- Iván Román – C
- Iker Ruiz de Galarreta – A
- Araitz Sande

Summary

Key:
- GWS – Game winning shots

Team	Event	Group stage								Semifinal	Final	
Team	Event	Opponent Score	Opponent Score	Opponent Score	Opponent Score	Opponent Score	Opponent Score	Opponent Score	Rank	Opponent Score	Opponent Score	Rank
Spain	Men's 3x3 tournament	Latvia; L 5–24	Denmark; L 2–15	Poland; L 5–10	Austria; L 3–4	Great Britain; L 5–8	Kazakhstan; L 4–14	Chinese Taipei; L 4–5	8	Did not advance		8

=== Men's 3x3 tournament ===
Preliminary round

Pos	Team	Pld	W	SOW	SOL	L	GF	GA	GD	Pts	Qualification
1	Latvia	7	7	0	0	0	119	31	+88	21	Semifinals
2	Austria	7	5	0	0	2	55	32	+23	15 (Note: Austria 7–5 Denmark)	Semifinals
3	Denmark	7	5	0	0	2	70	39	+31	15	Semifinals
4	Kazakhstan	7	4	0	0	3	93	59	+34	12 (Note: Poland 8–18 Kazakhstan)	Semifinals
5	Poland	7	4	0	0	3	58	59	−1	12	
6	Great Britain	7	2	0	0	5	46	97	−51	6	
7	Chinese Taipei	7	1	0	0	6	23	95	−72	3	
8	Spain	7	0	0	0	7	28	80	−52	0	

Source: Gangwon 2024
Notes:

20 January 2024; 13:30	Latvia	24–5 (9–2, 7–2, 8–1)	Spain	Gangneung Hockey Centre

Game reference
Referees: (Uzbekistan) David Prokofyev (Czech Republic) David Thuma

21 January 2024; 10:30	Denmark	15–2 (4–1, 5–0, 6–1)	Spain	Gangneung Hockey Centre

Game reference
Referees: (Canada) Mathieu Boudreau (Czech Republic) David Thuma

21 January 2024; 16:00	Poland	10–5 (2–2, 5–0, 3–3)	Spain	Gangneung Hockey Centre

Game reference
Referees: (South Korea) Lim Jun-seo (Czech Republic) David Thuma

22 January 2024; 09:00	Spain	3–4 (0–1, 1–2, 2–1)	Austria	Gangneung Hockey Centre

Game reference
Referees: (Canada) Mathieu Boudreau (United Kingdom) Joseph Sewell

22 January 2024; 17:30	Great Britain	8–5 (0–1, 4–3, 4–1)	Spain	Gangneung Hockey Centre

Game reference
Referees: (South Korea) Lim Jun-seo (Czech Republic) David Thuma

23 January 2024; 10:30	Spain	4–14 (1–2, 1–7, 2–5)	Kazakhstan	Gangneung Hockey Centre

Game reference
Referees: (South Korea) Lim Jun-seo (Czech Republic) David Thuma

23 January 2024; 16:00	Spain	4–5 (2–1, 0–2, 2–2)	Chinese Taipei	Gangneung Hockey Centre

Game reference
Referees: (South Korea) Lim Jun-seo (Uzbekistan) David Prokofyev

== Skeleton ==
Athlete	Event	Run 1		Run 2		Total	
Athlete	Event	Time	Rank	Time	Rank	Time	Rank
Clara Aznar	Women's	56.43	12	56.23	11	1:52.66	12

== Snowboarding ==
Snowboard cross

Athlete	Event	Group stage		Semifinal	Final
Athlete	Event	Points	Rank	Position	Position
Martxelo Urruzola	Men's snowboard cross	10	11	Did not advance	
Andrea Seijas	Women's snowboard cross	10	10	Did not advance	

Mixed

Athlete	Event	Pre-heats	Quarterfinal	Semifinal	Final
Athlete	Event	Position	Position	Position	Position
Martxelo Uruzola; Andrea Seijas	Team snowboard cross	4	Did not advance		

== Speed skating ==
Men

Athlete	Event	Time	Rank
Sergio Álvarez Fernandez	500 m	40.71	25
Sergio Álvarez Fernandez	1500 m	2:02.11	19
Christopher López Osorio	500 m	40.19	24
Christopher López Osorio	1500 m	2:08.29	27

Women

Athlete	Event	Time	Rank
Lucía Alapont Martinez	500 m	43.31	24
Lucía Alapont Martinez	1500 m	2:16.54	22
Ona Rodríguez Cornejo	500 m	41.195	11
Ona Rodríguez Cornejo	1500 m	2:13.04	17

Mass Start

Athlete	Event	Semifinal			Final		
Athlete	Event	Points	Time	Rank	Points	Time	Rank
Sergio Álvarez Fernandez	Men's mass start	12	6:21.16	3 Q	2	5:30.99	8
Christopher López Osorio	Men's mass start	0	5:50.08	14	Did not advance		
Lucía Alapont Martinez	Women's mass start	0	6:28.42	13	Did not advance		
Ona Rodríguez Cornejo	Women's mass start	2	5:59.23	9	Did not advance		

Mixed relay

Athlete	Event	Semifinal		Final	
Athlete	Event	Time	Rank	Time	Rank
Sergio Álvarez Fernandez; Ona Rodríguez Cornejo	Mixed relay	3:12.24	7	Did not advance	

== See also ==
- Spain at the 2024 Summer Olympics
