= Bobsleigh at the 2024 Winter Youth Olympics =

Bobsleigh at the IV Winter Youth Olympic Games
- Venue: Alpensia Sliding Centre
- Dates: 22–23 January
- Competitors: 30 from 16 nations

Bobsleigh at the 2024 Winter Youth Olympics took place from 22 to 23 January 2024 at the Alpensia Sliding Centre, Daegwallyeong-myeon, South Korea.

== Schedule ==
All times are in KST (UTC+9)

Date	Time	Event
22 January	14:30	Women's monobob
23 January	14:30	Men's monobob

== Medal summary ==
=== Medal table ===
* Host nation (South Korea)

Rank	Nation	Gold	Silver	Bronze	Total
1	Denmark	1	0	0	1
1	South Korea*	1	0	0	1
3	Thailand	0	1	0	1
3	Tunisia	0	1	0	1
5	China	0	0	1	1
5	Romania	0	0	1	1
Totals (6 entries)		2	2	2	6

=== Events ===
Event	Gold		Silver		Bronze	
Men's monobob	So Jae-hwan; South Korea	1:48.63	Jonathan Lourimi; Tunisia	1:49.96	Chi Xiangyu; China	1:50.18
Women's monobob	Maja Voigt; Denmark	1:53.31	Agnese Campeol; Thailand	1:54.17	Mihaela Anton; Romania	1:54.34

== Qualification ==
Each NOC with an athlete in the IBSF Youth Olympics Ranking List will receive a quota place, with additional quota being filled until 18 quotas have been reached., with max. 3 per NOC.

=== Summary ===
These are the quota obtained by each NOC:

NOC	Boys'	Girls'	Total
Austria	1	0	1
Brazil	2	0	2
Canada	1	1	2
China	1	0	1
Denmark	0	1	1
France	1	0	1
Germany	3	0	3
Great Britain	1	0	1
Jamaica	0	1	1
Latvia	0	2	2
Poland	1	0	1
Romania	2	2	4
South Korea	1	1	2
Thailand	1	1	2
Tunisia	1	2	3
United States	~~3~~ 2	1	3
Total: 16 NOCs	18	12	30

=== Eligible NOCs per event ===
Quota places	Boys'	Girls'
3	Germany; United States	—N/a
2	Romania; Brazil	Romania; Latvia; Tunisia
1	South Korea; China; Poland; Thailand; Tunisia; Austria; France; Canada; Great Britain	Denmark; United States; Thailand; South Korea; Canada; Jamaica
