= Ice hockey at the 2024 Winter Youth Olympics =

Youth Olympic

Ice hockey at the IV Winter Youth Olympic Games
- Venue: Gangneung Hockey Centre
- Dates: 20–31 January
- Competitors: 324 from 27 nations

Ice hockey at the 2024 Winter Youth Olympics comprised four events contested at the Gangneung Hockey Centre in Gangneung, South Korea from 20 to 31 January 2024.

Two tournaments were held: a traditional six-team tournament and a 3-on-3 tournament. Each tournament had both a men's and a women's event. A NOC that qualified for the traditional tournament was permitted a team of eighteen players and a NOC that qualified for the 3-on-3 tournament was permitted a team of thirteen athletes. As the host, South Korea was allowed to participate in both tournaments, but with teams of alternate genders.

== Schedule ==
| GS | Group stage | SF | Semi-finals | F | Final |

| Date Event | 19 Fri | 20 Sat | 21 Sun | 22 Mon | 23 Tue | 24 Wed | 25 Thu | 26 Fri | 27 Sat | 28 Sun | 29 Mon | 30 Tue | 31 Wed | 1 Thu |
|---|---|---|---|---|---|---|---|---|---|---|---|---|---|---|
| 3x3 | | GS | GS | GS | GS | SF | F | | | | | | | |
| 6x6 | | | | | | | | | GS | GS | GS | SF | F | |

== Medal summary ==
=== Medal table ===
* Host nation (South Korea)

| Rank | Nation | Gold | Silver | Bronze | Total |
|---|---|---|---|---|---|
| 1 | Hungary | 1 | 0 | 0 | 1 |
| 1 | Latvia | 1 | 0 | 0 | 1 |
| 1 | Sweden | 1 | 0 | 0 | 1 |
| 1 | United States | 1 | 0 | 0 | 1 |
| 5 | Czech Republic | 0 | 1 | 0 | 1 |
| 5 | Denmark | 0 | 1 | 0 | 1 |
| 5 | Japan | 0 | 1 | 0 | 1 |
| 5 | South Korea* | 0 | 1 | 0 | 1 |
| 9 | China | 0 | 0 | 1 | 1 |
| 9 | Finland | 0 | 0 | 1 | 1 |
| 9 | Germany | 0 | 0 | 1 | 1 |
| 9 | Kazakhstan | 0 | 0 | 1 | 1 |
| Totals (12 entries) | | 4 | 4 | 4 | 12 |

=== Medalists ===
| Event | Gold | Silver | Bronze |
|---|---|---|---|
| Men's tournament | United States: Abe Barnett; Michael Berchild; Cole Bumgarner; AJ Francisco; Aurelio Garcia; Shaeffer Gordon-Carroll; JP Hurlbert; Logan Lutner; Jackson Marthaler; Tyler Martyniuk; Luke Schairer; Logan Stuart; Spencer Thornborough; Zane Torre; Parker Trottier; Gavin Weeks; Xavier Wendt | Czech Republic: Šimon Bělohorský; Jakub Daněk; Petr Hanyš; David Huk; Lukáš Kachlíř; Šimon Katolický; Adam Klaus; Jan Láryš; Václav Nedorost; Filip Novák; František Poletín; Martin Psohlavec; Ben Reisnecker; Ondřej Ruml; Tobiáš Sekanina; Petr Tomek; Jakub Vaněček; Matěj Weiss | Finland: Samu Alalauri; Luka Arkko; William Gammals; Nooa Järvenpää; Viljo Kähkönen; Wilmer Kallio; Jiko Laitinen; Pyry Lammi; Matias Myllyniemi; Milo Nuutinen; Juho Piiparinen; Lauri Rantanen; Rasmus Rinne; Julius Suominen; Oliver Suvanto; Oliver Torkki; Eelis Uronen; Vili Varonen |
| Men's 3x3 tournament | Latvia: Martins Bārtulis; Leonards Grundmanis; Martins Klaucāns; Roberts Kravalis; Herberts Laugalis; Timurs Mališevs; Makss Mihailovs; Olivers Mūrnieks; Kristers Obuks; Fēlikss Paurs; Patriks Plūmiņš; Daniels Reidzāns; Ričards Rutkis | Denmark: Lucas Althof; Frederik Bech; Mikkel Bjerre; William Brix; Luca Bærentsen; Emil Jakobsen; Andreas Jørgensen; Max Kramer; Mikkel Poulsen; Gustav Remler-Jensen; Martinus Schioldan; Casey Silverman; Anton Wilde | Kazakhstan: Temirlan Aiboluly; Anuar Akhmetzhanov; Tair Bigarinov; Yegor Kravchenko; Arseniy Kuchkovskiy; Nikita Kulakov; Bexultan Makysh; Roman Michurov; Matvey Reshetko; Adilkhan Sattar; Zhakhanger Tleukhan; Arman Tolen; Rasul Tursynov |
| Women's tournament | Sweden: Judith Andersson; Chloe Berndtsson; Disa Carlsson; Maja Engelin; Tilde Grillfors; Selma Karlsson; Malva Lindgren; Elin Löwenadler; Ida Melin; Vilda Nordh; Nellie Norén; Nora Svanefjord; Alva Vitalisson; Tillie Ytfeldt; Ebba Westerlind; Tilde Wyckman; Maja Åkerlund; Matilda Österman | Japan: Nana Akimoto; Suzuno Fukuda; Momona Fukuzawa; Yumin Furuhira; Mayu Hosogoe; Tsumugi Ito; Reina Kakuta; Saika Kiyokawa; Riko Nishiuchi; Azumi Numabe; Umeka Odaira; Momoka Okamura; Koko Ruike; Lily Sato; Rio Suzuki; Rino Tada; Kika Terauchi; Nanaho Yamaguchi | Germany: Lina Alberts; Tara Bach; Emilija Birka; Sarah Bouceka; Hanna Bugl; Victoria Gmeiner; Mathilda Heine; Milana Lutz; Sandra Mayr; Caylee Nagle; Friederike Pfalz; Charleen Poindl; Madalena Seidel; Anabel Seyrer; Lena Spagert; Hanna Weichenhain; Zoe Wintgen; Theresa Zielinski |
| Women's 3x3 tournament | Hungary: Boróka Bátyi; Dóra Bereczki; Csenge Noémi Csordás; Luca Faragó; Lili Hajdu; Lorina Haraszt; Réka Effi Hiezl; Petra Polónyi; Lara Sághy; Bíborka Borbála Simon; Bonita Lilla Szabó; Noémi Zoé Takács; Krisztina Weiler | South Korea: Ahn Se-won; Chang Seo-yoon; Choi Seo-yoon; Han Chae-yeon; Han Ye-jin; Han Yu-an; Hong Chae-won; Jang Hyeon-jeong; Kim Ji-min; Na Se-young; Park Jeong-hyun; Park Ju-yeon; Shim Seo-hee | China: Ju Sihan; Kou Chenfei; Li Jun; Li Xin; Li Yifei; Mi Lan; Tian Xueying; Wang Bing; Wang Jinghan; Xin Yufei; Zhang Anna; Zhang Jingyue; Zhao Guiyun |

== Qualification ==
=== IIHF Youth Ranking ===
The top eleven NOCs ranked in the combined rankings from the 2022 and 2023 editions of the IIHF World U18 Championships and IIHF Women's World U18 Championships, and host South Korea, were allowed to enter either a boys' team or a girls' team for the traditional tournament (also called the 6-team tournament or 6-on-6 tournament). Starting with the highest-ranked country and descending by order of rank, each country selected in which gender's tournament it would compete until all tournament quota were filled. Each country was permitted one team totaling eighteen players, of which fifteen were skaters and three were goaltenders.

For the 3-on-3 tournament, countries ranked 12th to 27th, including host South Korea, fielded one team of thirteen players (eleven skaters and two goaltenders). Starting with the highest-ranked country and descending by order of rank, each country selected in which gender's tournament it would compete until all tournament quota were filled. Estonia was the only qualifying nation to decline its quota.

As the host country, South Korea was granted one team per tournament. The South Korean team playing in the 3-on-3 tournament was required to be the opposite gender of the South Korean team participating in the traditional tournament.

Ranking

| Rank | Team | Men | | Women | | Total points | Tournament qualified | | | |
| Rank | Team | 2022 | 2023 | 2022 | 2023 | Total points | 6x6 | | 3x3 | |
| Rank | Team | 2022 | 2023 | 2022 | 2023 | Total points | Men | Women | Men | Women |
|---|---|---|---|---|---|---|---|---|---|---|
| 1 | United States | 44 | 45 | 44 | 43 | 176 | Yes | | | |
| 2 | Sweden | 45 | 44 | 42 | 44 | 175 | | Yes | | |
| 3 | Canada | 41 | 43 | 45 | 45 | 174 | Yes | | | |
| 4 | Finland | 43 | 41 | 43 | 42 | 169 | Yes | | | |
| 5 | Czech Republic | 42 | 39 | 41 | 41 | 163 | Yes | | | |
| 6 | Slovakia | 37 | 42 | 40 | 40 | 159 | Yes | | | |
| 7 | Switzerland | 40 | 40 | 39 | 39 | 158 | | Yes | | |
| 8 | Germany | 38 | 36 | 38 | 37 | 149 | | Yes | | |
| 9 | Japan | 32 | 33 | 37 | 38 | 140 | | Yes | | |
| 10 | Norway | 36 | 37 | 33 | 32 | 138 | | Yes | | |
| 11 | France | 35 | 30 | 36 | 35 | 136 | | Yes | | |
| 12 | Hungary | 30 | 32 | 34 | 34 | 130 | | | | Yes |
| 13 | Italy | 29 | 27 | 35 | 36 | 127 | | | | Yes |
| 14 | Denmark | 33 | 34 | 28 | 31 | 126 | | | Yes | |
| 15 | Latvia | 39 | 38 | 22 | 24 | 123 | | | Yes | |
| 16 | Austria | 27 | 29 | 32 | 33 | 121 | | | Yes | |
| 17 | Poland | 26 | 24 | 31 | 30 | 111 | | | Yes | |
| 18 | South Korea | 25 | 26 | 29 | 28 | 108 | Yes | | | Yes |
| 19 | Kazakhstan | 34 | 35 | 19 | 19 | 107 | | | Yes | |
| 20 | Great Britain | 23 | 21 | 25 | 22 | 91 | | | Yes | |
| 21 | Spain | 18 | 18 | 26 | 29 | 91 | | | Yes | |
| 22 | Chinese Taipei | 13 | 15 | 30 | 27 | 85 | | | Yes | |
| 23 | Netherlands | 17 | 17 | 23 | 23 | 80 | | | | Yes |
| 24 | Australia | 15 | 13 | 24 | 25 | 77 | | | | Yes |
| 25 | China | 15 | 16 | 27 | 26 | 64 | | | | Yes |
| 26 | Estonia | 24 | 25 | 0 | 14 | 63 | | | | |
| 27 | Turkey | 8 | 9 | 21 | 21 | 59 | | | | Yes |
| 28 | Mexico | 9 | 8 | 20 | 20 | 57 | | | | Yes |
