= Kazakhstan at the 2024 Winter Youth Olympics =

- Flag of Kazakhstan
- IOC code: KAZ
- NOC: National Olympic Committee of the Republic of Kazakhstan

in Gangwon, South Korea 19 January 2024 – 1 February 2024
- Competitors: 41 in 9 sports
- Flag bearer (opening): Yerassyl Shyngyskhan & Kristina Shumekova
- Flag bearer (closing): TBD
- Medals Ranked 20th: Gold 1 Silver 0 Bronze 2 Total 3

Winter Youth Olympics appearances (overview)
- 2012; 2016; 2020; 2024

Kazakhstan is scheduled to compete at the 2024 Winter Youth Olympics in Gangwon, South Korea, from 19 January to 1 February 2024, This will be Kazakhstan's fourth appearance at the Winter Youth Olympic Games, having competed at every Games since the inaugural edition in 2012.

The Kazakh team consisted of 41 athletes (27 men and 14 women) competing in ten sports. Short track speed skater Yerassyl Shyngyskhan and speed skater Kristina Shumekova were the country's flagbearers during the opening ceremony.

== Competitors ==
The following is the list of number of competitors (per gender) participating at the games per sport/discipline.

| Sport | Men | Women | Total |
|---|---|---|---|
| Alpine skiing | 1 | 1 | 2 |
| Biathlon | 3 | 3 | 6 |
| Cross-country skiing | 2 | 2 | 4 |
| Curling | 1 | 1 | 2 |
| Freestyle skiing | 1 | 1 | 1 |
| Ice hockey | 13 | 0 | 13 |
| Ski jumping | 2 | 2 | 4 |
| Short track speed skating | 2 | 2 | 4 |
| Speed skating | 2 | 2 | 4 |
| Total | 27 | 14 | 41 |

== Medalists ==
| Medal | Name | Sport | Event | Date |
|---|---|---|---|---|
| Gold | Ilya Mizernykh | Ski jumping | Men's individual normal hill | 20 January |
| Bronze | Polina Omelchuk | Short track speed skating | Women's 1000 metres | 21 January |
| Bronze | Kazakhstan men's national under-16 ice hockey team | Ice hockey | Men's 3x3 tournament | 25 January |

== Alpine skiing ==
Kazakhstan qualified two alpine skiers (one per gender).

Men

| Athlete | Event | Run 1 | | Run 2 | | Total | |
| Athlete | Event | Time | Rank | Time | Rank | Time | Rank |
|---|---|---|---|---|---|---|---|
| Rostislav Khokhlov | Super-G | — | | | | 59.54 | 45 |
| Rostislav Khokhlov | Giant slalom | 53.36 | 44 | 48.75 | 31 | 1:42.11 | 33 |
| Rostislav Khokhlov | Slalom | 50.58 | 35 | 55.80 | 19 | 1:46.38 | 19 |
| Rostislav Khokhlov | Combined | 58.68 | 42 | DNF | | | |

Women

| Athlete | Event | Run 1 | | Run 2 | | Total | |
| Athlete | Event | Time | Rank | Time | Rank | Time | Rank |
|---|---|---|---|---|---|---|---|
| Alexandra Skorokhodova | Super-G | — | | | | 55.71 | 18 |
| Alexandra Skorokhodova | Giant slalom | 49.71 | 9 | 52.80 | 4 | 1:42.51 | 5 |
| Alexandra Skorokhodova | Slalom | 50.84 | 8 | 49.50 | 14 | 1:40.34 | 9 |
| Alexandra Skorokhodova | Combined | 57.96 | 16 | 52.52 | 8 | 1:50.48 | 10 |

== Biathlon ==
Kazakhstan qualified six biathletes (three per gender).

Men

| Athlete | Event | Time | Misses | Rank |
|---|---|---|---|---|
| Ilyas Khassenov | Sprint | 26:38.9 | 7 (4+3) | 77 |
| Ilyas Khassenov | Individual | 48:19.7 | 7 (2+0+1+4) | 42 |
| Anton Redkin | Sprint | 23:16.2 | 1 (1+0) | 17 |
| Anton Redkin | Individual | 52:00.3 | 9 (3+3+0+3) | 72 |
| Kirill Zotov | Sprint | 24:33.7 | 3 (2+1) | 48 |
| Kirill Zotov | Individual | 45:55.0 | 3 (1+1+0+1) | 23 |

Women

| Athlete | Event | Time | Misses | Rank |
|---|---|---|---|---|
| Alema Karabayeva | Sprint | 25:04.9 | 5 (4+1) | 57 |
| Alema Karabayeva | Individual | 43:27.3 | 4 (1+0+1+2) | 36 |
| Evelina Mezentseva | Sprint | 25:23.8 | 7 (4+3) | 62 |
| Evelina Mezentseva | Individual | 45:00.3 | 8 (3+2+2+1) | 57 |
| Mariya Vorobyeva | Sprint | DNF | | |
| Mariya Vorobyeva | Individual | 49:18.4 | 9 (2+2+2+3) | 82 |

Mixed

| Athletes | Event | Time | Misses | Rank |
|---|---|---|---|---|
| Alema Karabayeva; Ilyas Khassenov | Single mixed relay | 47:31.0 | 10 (0+10) | 10 |
| Alema Karabayeva; Evelina Mezentseva; Anton Redkin; Kirill Zotov | Mixed relay | 1:23:56.5 | 18 (3+15) | 11 |

== Cross-country skiing ==
Kazakhstan qualified four cross-country skiers (two per gender).

Men

| Athlete | Event | Qualification | | Quarterfinal | | Semifinal | | Final | |
| Athlete | Event | Time | Rank | Time | Rank | Time | Rank | Time | Rank |
|---|---|---|---|---|---|---|---|---|---|
| Berik Boranbayev | 7.5 km classical | — | | | | | | 21:39.9 | 35 |
| Berik Boranbayev | Sprint freestyle | 3:10.43 | 22 Q | 3:07.01 | 5 | Did not advance | | | |
| Aubakir Totanov | 7.5 km classical | — | | | | | | 21:59.7 | 40 |
| Aubakir Totanov | Sprint freestyle | 3:18.78 | 37 | Did not advance | | | | | |

Women

| Athlete | Event | Qualification | | Quarterfinal | | Semifinal | | Final | |
| Athlete | Event | Time | Rank | Time | Rank | Time | Rank | Time | Rank |
|---|---|---|---|---|---|---|---|---|---|
| Milana Mamedova | 7.5 km classical | — | | | | | | 27:28.8 | 52 |
| Milana Mamedova | Sprint freestyle | 4:13.16 | 56 | Did not advance | | | | | |
| Violetta Mitropolskaya | 7.5 km classical | — | | | | | | 24:06.8 | 25 |
| Violetta Mitropolskaya | Sprint freestyle | 3:50.35 | 33 | Did not advance | | | | | |

Mixed

| Athlete | Event | Time | Rank |
|---|---|---|---|
| Milana Mamedova; Berik Boranbayev; Violetta Mitropolskaya; Aubakir Totanov | Mixed relay | 58:57.4 | 16 |

== Curling ==
Kazakhstan qualified a mixed doubles pair for a total of two athletes (one per gender).

Summary

| Team | Event | Group Stage | | | | | | Quarterfinal | Semifinal | Final / BM | |
| Team | Event | Opposition Score | Opposition Score | Opposition Score | Opposition Score | Opposition Score | Rank | Opposition Score | Opposition Score | Opposition Score | Rank |
|---|---|---|---|---|---|---|---|---|---|---|---|
| Merey Tastemir; Ibragim Tastemir | Mixed doubles | Austria; L | Germany; L 4–8 | Switzerland; L 1–9 | Italy; W 10–2 | Denmark; L 3–15 | 5 | Did not advance | | | 18 |

=== Mixed doubles ===
| Group D | W | L | W–L | DSC |
|---|---|---|---|---|
| Denmark | 4 | 1 | 1–1 | 30.64 |
| Germany | 4 | 1 | 1–1 | 31.04 |
| Switzerland | 4 | 1 | 1–1 | 79.90 |
| Austria | 2 | 3 | – | 40.68 |
| Kazakhstan | 1 | 4 | – | 44.33 |
| Italy | 0 | 5 | – | 107.78 |

Round robin

Draw 4

Saturday, January 27, 18:00

| Sheet D | 1 | 2 | 3 | 4 | 5 | 6 | 7 | 8 | Final |
| Austria (Müller / Heinisch) | 0 | 0 | 1 | 1 | 0 | 2 | 1 | | W |
| Kazakhstan (Tastemir / Tastemir) | 2 | 1 | 0 | 0 | 1 | 0 | 0 | / | L |

- Kazakhstan forfeited the game (ran out of time during end 8, 1 stone remaining)

Draw 6

Sunday, January 28, 14:00

| Sheet C | 1 | 2 | 3 | 4 | 5 | 6 | 7 | 8 | Final |
| Germany (Sutor / Angrick) | 1 | 2 | 1 | 3 | 0 | 1 | 0 | X | 8 |
| Kazakhstan (Tastemir / Tastemir) | 0 | 0 | 0 | 0 | 1 | 0 | 3 | X | 4 |

Draw 8

Monday, January 29, 10:00

| Sheet B | 1 | 2 | 3 | 4 | 5 | 6 | 7 | 8 | Final |
| Switzerland (Haehlen / Caccivio) | 3 | 1 | 0 | 1 | 1 | 3 | X | X | 9 |
| Kazakhstan (Tastemir / Tastemir) | 0 | 0 | 1 | 0 | 0 | 0 | X | X | 1 |

Draw 13

Tuesday, January 30, 18:00

| Sheet D | 1 | 2 | 3 | 4 | 5 | 6 | 7 | 8 | Final |
| Kazakhstan (Tastemir / Tastemir) | 1 | 2 | 3 | 0 | 4 | 0 | X | X | 10 |
| Italy (Maioni / Nichelatti) | 0 | 0 | 0 | 1 | 0 | 1 | X | X | 2 |

Draw 15

Wednesday, January 31, 12:30

| Sheet B | 1 | 2 | 3 | 4 | 5 | 6 | 7 | 8 | Final |
| Kazakhstan (Tastemir / Tastemir) | 0 | 0 | 0 | 0 | 3 | 0 | X | X | 3 |
| Denmark (Schmidt / Schmidt) | 4 | 1 | 3 | 1 | 0 | 6 | X | X | 15 |

== Freestyle skiing ==
Kazakhstan qualified two freestyle skiers (one per gender).

Dual moguls
Individual

| Athlete | Event | Group Stage | | | | | | Semifinals | Final / BM | |
| Athlete | Event | Opposition Result | Opposition Result | Opposition Result | Opposition Result | Points | Rank | Opposition Result | Opposition Result | Rank |
|---|---|---|---|---|---|---|---|---|---|---|
| Denis Rastruba | Men's dual moguls | Lee (KOR); L 2–3 | Buzzi (SUI); W 3–DNF | Sauvageau (CAN); L 2–3 | Perets (UKR); W 3–2 | 10 | 3 | Did not advance | | |
| Yuliya Feklistova | Women's dual moguls | Lodge (AUS); L 2–3 | Kisil (UKR); W 3–2 | Joly (FRA); W 3–2 | Sakai (JPN); L 2–3 | 10 | 3 | Did not advance | | |

Team

| Athlete | Event | Round of 16 | Quarterfinals | Semifinals | Final / BM | |
| Athlete | Event | Opposition Result | Opposition Result | Opposition Result | Opposition Result | Rank |
|---|---|---|---|---|---|---|
| Yuliya Feklistova; Denis Rastruba | Mixed team | Joly / Gay (FRA); L 20–50 | Did not advance | | | |

== Ice hockey ==
Kazakhstan qualified a team of thirteen ice hockey players for the men's 3-on-3 ice hockey tournament. On January 25, Kazakhstan's junior ice hockey team secured the bronze medal in the men's 3-on-3 tournament at the 2024 Winter Youth Olympics in Gangwon, South Korea. It was the first Olympic medal in hockey in the history of Kazakhstan, as well as the first Olympic medal in a team sport for the country.

Roster

Ramazan Kaidarov served as head coach.

- Temirlan Aiboluly – A
- Anuar Akhmetzhanov
- Tair Bigarinov – C
- Yegor Kravchenko
- Arseniy Kuchkovskiy
- Nikita Kulakov
- Bexultan Makysh
- Roman Michurov – A
- Matvey Reshetko
- Adilkhan Sattar
- Zhakhanger Tleukhan
- Arman Tolen
- Rasul Tursynov

Summary

Key:
- GWS – Match decided by game winning shots

| Team | Event | Group stage | | | | | | | | Semifinal | Final | |
| Team | Event | Opponent Score | Opponent Score | Opponent Score | Opponent Score | Opponent Score | Opponent Score | Opponent Score | Rank | Opponent Score | Opponent Score | Rank |
|---|---|---|---|---|---|---|---|---|---|---|---|---|
| Kazakhstan men's | Men's 3x3 tournament | Poland; W 18–8 | Austria; L 8–9 | Latvia; L 11–15 | Denmark; L 6–8 | Chinese Taipei; W 14–2 | Spain; W 14–4 | Great Britain; W 22–13 | 4 Q | Latvia; L 5–19 | Austria; W 6–5 | 3rd place, bronze medalist(s) |

=== Men's 3x3 tournament ===
Preliminary round

| Pos | Team | Pld | W | SOW | SOL | L | GF | GA | GD | Pts | Qualification |
|---|---|---|---|---|---|---|---|---|---|---|---|
| 1 | Latvia | 7 | 7 | 0 | 0 | 0 | 119 | 31 | +88 | 21 | Semifinals |
| 2 | Austria | 7 | 5 | 0 | 0 | 2 | 55 | 32 | +23 | 15 (Note: Austria 7–5 Denmark) | Semifinals |
| 3 | Denmark | 7 | 5 | 0 | 0 | 2 | 70 | 39 | +31 | 15 | Semifinals |
| 4 | Kazakhstan | 7 | 4 | 0 | 0 | 3 | 93 | 59 | +34 | 12 (Note: Poland 8–18 Kazakhstan) | Semifinals |
| 5 | Poland | 7 | 4 | 0 | 0 | 3 | 58 | 59 | −1 | 12 | |
| 6 | Great Britain | 7 | 2 | 0 | 0 | 5 | 46 | 97 | −51 | 6 | |
| 7 | Chinese Taipei | 7 | 1 | 0 | 0 | 6 | 23 | 95 | −72 | 3 | |
| 8 | Spain | 7 | 0 | 0 | 0 | 7 | 28 | 80 | −52 | 0 | |

Source: Gangwon 2024
Notes:

| 20 January 2024; 12:00 | Poland | 8–18 (2–3, 4–5, 2–10) | Kazakhstan | Gangneung Hockey Centre |

Game reference
| Referees: (Canada) Mathieu Boudreau (Uzbekistan) David Prokofyev |

| 21 January 2024; 10:30 | Kazakhstan | 8–9 (4–4, 4–4, 0–1) | Austria | Gangneung Hockey Centre |

Game reference
| Referees: (South Korea) Lim Jun-seo (United Kingdom) Joseph Sewell |

| 21 January 2024; 17:30 | Latvia | 15–11 (5–6, 6–0, 4–5) | Kazakhstan | Gangneung Hockey Centre |

Game reference
| Referees: (Canada) Mathieu Boudreau (United Kingdom) Joseph Sewell |

| 22 January 2024; 09:00 | Kazakhstan | 6–8 (3–1, 1–3, 2–4) | Denmark | Gangneung Hockey Centre |

Game reference
| Referees: (Uzbekistan) David Prokofyev (Czech Republic) David Thuma |

| 22 January 2024; 16:00 | Chinese Taipei | 2–14 (1–7, 1–1, 0–6) | Kazakhstan | Gangneung Hockey Centre |

Game reference
| Referees: (Canada) Mathieu Boudreau (South Korea) Lim Jun-seo |

| 23 January 2024; 10:30 | Spain | 4–14 (1–2, 1–7, 2–5) | Kazakhstan | Gangneung Hockey Centre |

Game reference
| Referees: (South Korea) Lim Jun-seo (Czech Republic) David Thuma |

| 23 January 2024; 17:30 | Kazakhstan | 22–13 (6–1, 7–7, 9–5) | Great Britain | Gangneung Hockey Centre |

Game reference
| Referees: (Uzbekistan) David Prokofyev (Czech Republic) David Thuma |

Semifinal

| 24 January 2024; 12:00 | Latvia | 19–5 (9–1, 3–2, 7–2) | Kazakhstan | Gangneung Hockey Centre |

Game reference
| Referees: (Canada) Mathieu Boudreau (Uzbekistan) David Prokofyev |

Bronze medal game

| 25 January 2024; 12:00 | Austria | 5–6 (1–4, 2–1, 2–1) | Kazakhstan | Gangneung Hockey Centre |

Game reference
| Referees: (South Korea) Lim Jun-seo (United Kingdom) Joseph Sewell |

== Short track speed skating ==
Kazakhstan qualified four short track speed skaters (two per gender).

Men

| Athlete | Event | Heats | | Quarterfinal | | Semifinal | | Final | |
| Athlete | Event | Time | Rank | Time | Rank | Time | Rank | Time | Rank |
|---|---|---|---|---|---|---|---|---|---|
| Yerassyl Shynggyskhan | 500 m | 44.812 | 3 | Did not advance | | | | | |
| Yerassyl Shynggyskhan | 1000 m | 1:35.324 | 4 | Did not advance | | | | | |
| Yerassyl Shynggyskhan | 1500 m | — | | 2:24.126 | 4 q | 2:41.421 | 5 | Did not advance | |
| Meiirzhan Tolegen | 500 m | 43.517 | 2 Q | 42.680 | 5 | Did not advance | | | |
| Meiirzhan Tolegen | 1000 m | 1:34.212 | 4 | Did not advance | | | | | |
| Meiirzhan Tolegen | 1500 m | — | | YC | | Did not advance | | | |

Women

| Athlete | Event | Heats | | Quarterfinal | | Semifinal | | Final | |
| Athlete | Event | Time | Rank | Time | Rank | Time | Rank | Time | Rank |
|---|---|---|---|---|---|---|---|---|---|
| Anastassiya Astrakhantseva | 500 m | 45.832 | 2 Q | 1:04.707 | 5 | Did not advance | | | |
| Anastassiya Astrakhantseva | 1000 m | 1:39.806 | 1 Q | 1:37.164 | 4 | Did not advance | | | |
| Anastassiya Astrakhantseva | 1500 m | — | | 2:38.781 | 2 Q | 2:26.914 | 3 FB | 2:46.816 | 13 |
| Polina Omelchuk | 500 m | 45.230 | 1 Q | 45.062 | 3 | Did not advance | | | |
| Polina Omelchuk | 1000 m | 1:36.334 | 2 Q | 1:33.253 | 3 q | 1:32.918 | 2 FA | 1:41.600 | 3rd place, bronze medalist(s) |
| Polina Omelchuk | 1500 m | — | | 2:33.959 | 3 Q | 2:26.749 | 2 FA | 2:43.162 | 6 |

Mixed

| Athlete | Event | Semifinal | | Final | |
| Athlete | Event | Time | Rank | Time | Rank |
|---|---|---|---|---|---|
| Anastassiya Astrakhantseva; Polina Omelchuk; Yerassyl Shynggyskhan; Meiirzhan Tolegen | Mixed relay | PEN | | Did not advance | |

== Ski jumping ==
Kazakhstan qualified four ski jumpers (two per gender).

| Athlete | Event | First round | | | Final | | | Total | |
| Athlete | Event | Distance | Points | Rank | Distance | Points | Rank | Points | Rank |
|---|---|---|---|---|---|---|---|---|---|
| Ilya Mizernykh | Men's normal hill | 103.5 | 110.2 | 3 | 102.0 | 103.8 | 3 | 214.0 | 1st place, gold medalist(s) |
| Ilya Shilnikov | Men's normal hill | 81.0 | 59.6 | 30 | 84.0 | 64.8 | 25 | 124.4 | 30 |
| Sofya Shishkina | Women's normal hill | 63.5 | 20.1 | 28 | 65.0 | 24.3 | 29 | 44.4 | 29 |
| Alyona Sviridenko | Women's normal hill | 66.5 | 26.1 | 26 | 69.0 | 27.8 | 28 | 53.9 | 27 |
| Sofya Shishkina; Ilya Shilnikov; Alyona Sviridenko; Ilya Mizernykh | Mixed team | 324.0 | 249.1 | 13 | 309.0 | 242.2 | 13 | 491.3 | 13 |

== Speed skating ==
Kazakhstan qualified four speed skaters (two per gender).

Men

| Athlete | Event | Time | Rank |
|---|---|---|---|
| Mikhail Matryukhin | 500 m | 39.56 | 18 |
| Mikhail Matryukhin | 1500 m | 2:01.60 | 17 |
| Ruslan Zhanadilov | 500 m | 38.26 | 14 |
| Ruslan Zhanadilov | 1500 m | 1:55.67 | 8 |

Women

| Athlete | Event | Time | Rank |
|---|---|---|---|
| Alina Shumekova | 500 m | 41.193 | 10 |
| Alina Shumekova | 1500 m | 2:09.27 | 11 |
| Kristina Shumekova | 500 m | 40.89 | 7 |
| Kristina Shumekova | 1500 m | 2:06.47 | 7 |

Mass Start

| Athlete | Event | Semifinal | | | Final | | |
| Athlete | Event | Points | Time | Rank | Points | Time | Rank |
|---|---|---|---|---|---|---|---|
| Mikhail Matryukhin | Men's mass start | 1 | 6:22.65 | 9 | Did not advance | | |
| Ruslan Zhanadilov | Men's mass start | 2 | 5:36.69 | 8 Q | 0 | 5:31.80 | 11 |
| Alina Shumekova | Women's mass start | 3 | 5:59.81 | 5 Q | DQ | | |
| Kristina Shumekova | Women's mass start | 3 | 6:26.07 | 7 Q | 0 | 5:58.38 | 12 |

Mixed relay

| Athlete | Event | Semifinal | | Final | |
| Athlete | Event | Time | Rank | Time | Rank |
|---|---|---|---|---|---|
| Kristina Shumekova; Ruslan Zhanadilov | Mixed relay | DQ | | Did not advance | |

== See also ==
- Kazakhstan at the 2024 Summer Olympics
