= Skeleton at the 2024 Winter Youth Olympics =

Skeleton at the IV Winter Youth Olympic Games
- Venue: Alpensia Sliding Centre
- Dates: 22–23 January
- Competitors: 38 from 17 nations

Skeleton at the 2024 Winter Youth Olympics took place from 22 to 23 January 2024 at the Alpensia Sliding Centre, Daegwallyeong-myeon, South Korea.

== Schedule ==
All times are in KST (UTC+9)

Date	Time	Event
22 January	17:30	Women's
23 January	17:30	Men's

== Medal summary ==
=== Medal table ===
* Host nation (South Korea)

Rank	Nation	Gold	Silver	Bronze	Total
1	Latvia	1	1	1	3
2	Germany	1	0	0	1
3	Ukraine	0	1	0	1
4	South Korea*	0	0	1	1
Totals (4 entries)		2	2	2	6

=== Medalists ===
Event	Gold		Silver		Bronze	
Men's	Emīls Indriksons; Latvia	1:44.66	Yaroslav Lavreniuk; Ukraine	1:45.67	Shin Yeon-su; South Korea	1:46.05
Women's	Maria Votz; Germany	1:49.45	Dārta Neimane; Latvia	1:49.79	Laura Lēģere; Latvia	1:50.22

== Qualification ==
Each NOC with an athlete in the IBSF Youth Olympics Ranking List will receive a quota place, with additional quota being filled until 20 quotas have been reached., with max. 3 per NOC.

=== Summary ===
These are the quota obtained by each NOC:

NOC	Men's	Women's	Total
Austria	0	1	1
Brazil	2	0	2
China	0	1	1
Colombia	1	0	1
Denmark	1	1	2
Germany	2	2	4
Japan	0	1	1
Latvia	2	3	5
Netherlands	2	1	3
Romania	2	2	4
Serbia	2	0	2
Slovakia	1	0	1
South Korea	1	2	3
Spain	0	1	1
Thailand	0	2	2
Ukraine	2	0	2
United States	2	1	3
Total: 17 NOCs	20	18	38

=== Eligible NOCs per event ===
Quota places	Men's	Women's
3	—N/a	Latvia
2	Latvia; Ukraine; Romania; Germany; United States; Brazil; Netherlands; Serbia	Germany; Romania; South Korea; Thailand
1	South Korea; Slovakia; Denmark; Colombia	China; Austria; Denmark; Spain; Japan; Netherlands; United States
