= Tunisia at the 2024 Winter Youth Olympics =

- Flag of Tunisia
- IOC code: TUN
- NOC: Tunisian Olympic Committee
- Website: www.cnot.org.tn (in French)

in Gangwon, South Korea 19 January 2024 – 1 February 2024
- Competitors: 3 in 1 sport
- Flag bearer (opening): Jonathan Lourimi
- Flag bearer (closing): TBD
- Medals Ranked 27th: Gold 0 Silver 1 Bronze 0 Total 1

Winter Youth Olympics appearances (overview)
- 2024

Tunisia competed at the 2024 Winter Youth Olympics in Gangwon, South Korea, from January 19 to February 1, 2024. This was Tunisia's debut appearance at the Winter Youth Olympic Games. This will mark the country's first ever participation at a Winter or Winter Youth Olympics.

Tunisia's team consisted of three bobsledders (one man and two women). Bobsledder Jonathan Lourimi was the country's flagbearer during the opening ceremony.

On January 23, bobsledder Jonathan Lourimi earned the silver medal in the men's monobob, becoming the first Tunisian athlete to win a Winter Youth Olympics medal. This was only the second Winter Youth Olympics medal by a North African nation, after Morocco's historic gold in 2012.

== Competitors ==
The following is the list of number of competitors (per gender) participating at the games per sport/discipline.

Sport	Men	Women	Total
Bobsleigh	1	2	3
Total	1	2	3

== Medalists ==
Medal	Name	Sport	Event	Date
Silver	Jonathan Lourimi	Bobsleigh	Men's monobob	23 January

== Bobsleigh ==
Tunisia qualified three bobsledders (one man and two women).

Athlete	Event	Run 1		Run 2		Total	
Athlete	Event	Time	Rank	Time	Rank	Time	Rank
Jonathan Lourimi	Men's monobob	54.79	2	55.17	3	1:49.96	2nd place, silver medalist(s)
Sophie Ghorbel	Women's monobob	58.35	12	57.96	8	1:56.31	12
Beya Mokrani	Women's monobob	57.78	9	58.50	12	1:56.28	10

== See also ==
- Tunisia at the 2024 Summer Olympics
