= Luge at the 2024 Winter Youth Olympics – Team relay =

Team relay at the IV Winter Youth Olympic Games
- Venue: Alpensia Sliding Centre
- Dates: 23 January
- Competitors: 40 from 10 nations
- Winning time: 2:29.470

Medalists
1st place, gold medalist(s)		Alexandra Oberstolz; Leon Haselrieder; Philipp Brunner; Manuel Weissensteiner	Italy
2nd place, silver medalist(s)		Margita Sirsniņa; Edvards Marts Markitāns; Jānis Gruzdulis-Borovojs; Ēdens Eduards Čepulis	Latvia
3rd place, bronze medalist(s)		Marie Riedl; Paul Socher; Johannes Scharnagl; Moritz Schiegl	Austria

The team relay luge at the 2024 Winter Youth Olympics took place on 23 January at the Alpensia Sliding Centre.

== Results ==
The event was started at 10:30

Rank	Bib	Athlete	Country	Women's singles	Men's singles	Doubles	Total	Behind
1st place, gold medalist(s)	10–1; 10–2; 10–3	Alexandra Oberstolz; Leon Haselrieder; Philipp Brunner / Manuel Weissensteiner	Italy	49.244	50.047	50.179	2:29.470	
2nd place, silver medalist(s)	7–1; 7–2; 7–3	Margita Sirsniņa; Edvards Marts Markitāns; Jānis Gruzdulis-Borovojs / Ēdens Eduards Čepulis	Latvia	49.241	50.974	50.084	2:30.299	+0.829
3rd place, bronze medalist(s)	9–1; 9–2; 9–3	Marie Riedl; Paul Socher; Johannes Scharnagl / Moritz Schiegl	Austria	49.693	49.905	50.823	2:30.421	+0.951
4	5–1; 5–2; 5–3	Kim So-yoon; Kim Bo-keun; Kim Ha-yoon / Bae Jae-seong	South Korea	49.943	50.643	52.324	2:32.910	+3.440
5	3–1; 3–2; 3–3	Daryna Fedorchuk; Anton Shevchuk; Maksym Panchuk / Andrii Muts	Ukraine	50.721	50.685	52.056	2:33.462	+3.992
6	6–1; 6–2; 6–3	Emilia Nosal; Michał Gancarczyk; Karol Warzybok / Cyprian Dybalski	Poland	49.257	51.611	52.660	2:33.528	+4.058
7	4–1; 4–2; 4–3	Viktória Praxová; Oliver Korbela; Bruno Mick / Viktor Varga	Slovakia	50.667	51.462	51.917	2:34.046	+4.576
8	1–1; 1–2; 1–3	Ana Cezara Teodorescu; Vlad Florin Mușei; Nicolae Todirică / Alexandru Ioan Bălan	Romania	50.890	50.934	53.093	2:34.917	+5.447
9	2–1; 2–2; 2–3	Talia Tonn; Orson Colby; Nathan Bivins / Wolfgang Lux	United States	50.686	52.079	53.375	2:36.140	+6.670
	8–1; 8–2; 8–3	Antonia Pietschmann; Silas Sartor; Louis Grünbeck / Maximilian Kührt	Germany	48.57	51.122	DNF	DNF	
