= Skeleton at the 2024 Winter Youth Olympics – Women's =

Women's skeleton at the IV Winter Youth Olympic Games
- Venue: Alpensia Sliding Centre
- Dates: 22 January
- Competitors: 18 from 12 nations
- Winning time: 1:49.45

Medalists
1st place, gold medalist(s)		Maria Votz	Germany
2nd place, silver medalist(s)		Dārta Neimane	Latvia
3rd place, bronze medalist(s)		Laura Lēģere	Latvia

The women's skeleton event at the 2024 Winter Youth Olympics took place on 23 January at the Alpensia Sliding Centre.

== Results ==
The first run was held at 17:30 and the second run at 18:24.

Rank	Bib	Athlete	Country	Run 1	Rank 1	Run 2	Rank 2	Total	Behind
1st place, gold medalist(s)	1	Maria Votz	Germany	54.72	2	54.73	3	1:49.45	
2nd place, silver medalist(s)	8	Dārta Neimane	Latvia	54.62	1	55.17	4	1:49.79	+0.34
3rd place, bronze medalist(s)	10	Laura Lēģere	Latvia	54.92	3	55.30	7	1:50.22	+0.77
4	2	Nanna Vestergaard Johansen	Denmark	55.74	8	54.54	2	1:50.28	+0.83
5	3	Marta Andžāne	Latvia	55.90	10	54.49	1	1:50.39	+0.94
6	4	Sarah Baumgartner	Austria	55.22	4	55.19	5	1:50.41	+0.96
7	16	Chung Ye-eun	South Korea	55.61	7	55.29	6	1:50.90	+1.45
8	9	Adelina Gabriela Bădăra	Romania	55.58	6	55.65	9	1:51.23	+1.78
9	7	Marie Angerer	Germany	55.34	5	56.45	13	1:51.79	+2.34
10	11	Ioana Toma	Romania	55.79	9	56.24	12	1:52.03	+2.58
11	13	Kim Ye-rim	South Korea	56.00	11	56.05	10	1:52.05	+2.60
12	6	Clara Aznar	Spain	56.43	12	56.23	11	1:52.66	+3.21
13	15	Mio Shinohara	Japan	57.36	13	57.67	14	1:55.03	+5.58
14	17	Phonchanan Pongsak	Thailand	57.45	14	58.63	16	1:56.08	+6.63
15	5	Liang Yuxin	China	1:01.06	17	55.47	8	1:56.53	+7.08
16	12	Biancha Emery	United States	58.18	15	58.88	17	1:57.06	+7.61
17	14	Florijn de Haas	Netherlands	59.74	16	57.75	15	1:57.49	+8.04
18	18	Maturada Kanram	Thailand	1:01.90	18	1:01.65	18	2:03.55	+14.10
