= Curling at the 2024 Winter Youth Olympics =

Curling at the IV Winter Youth Olympic Games
- Venue: Gangneung Curling Centre
- Dates: 20 January – 1 February
- Competitors: 106 from 24 nations

Curling at the 2024 Winter Youth Olympics took place at the Gangneung Curling Centre in Gangneung, South Korea from 20 January to 1 February 2024.

A total of up to 112 athletes (56 per gender) qualified to compete, with 16 teams (64 athletes total) in the mixed teams competition and 24 in the mixed doubles competition (48 athletes).

The Athlete Role Models for the Youth Olympics curling competition were Jennifer Dodds of Great Britain and Kim Chang-min of South Korea.

== Medal summary ==
=== Medal table ===
Rank	Nation	Gold	Silver	Bronze	Total
1	Great Britain	2	0	0	2
2	Denmark	0	2	0	2
3	Switzerland	0	0	1	1
3	United States	0	0	1	1
Totals (4 entries)		2	2	2	6

=== Events ===
Games	Gold	Silver	Bronze
Mixed team	Great Britain; Logan Carson; Tia Laurie; Archie Hyslop; Holly Burke	Denmark; Jacob Schmidt; Katrine Schmidt; Nikki Jensen; Emilie Holtermann	Switzerland; Nathan Dryburgh; Alissa Rudolf; Livio Ernst; Jana Soltermann
Mixed doubles	Great Britain; Callie Soutar; Ethan Brewster	Denmark; Katrine Schmidt; Jacob Schmidt	United States; Ella Wendling; Benji Paral

== Qualification ==
The World Junior Curling Championships and World Junior B Curling Championships during the 2022–23 curling season was used to determine the teams. On April 12, 2023, the World Curling Federation confirmed the teams qualified for the competitions.

=== Qualification summary ===
NOC	Mixed		Total
NOC	Team	Doubles	Athletes
Austria		Yes	2
Brazil	Yes	Yes	4
Canada	Yes	Yes	6
China	Yes	Yes	6
Czech Republic		Yes	2
Denmark	Yes	Yes	4
Germany	Yes	Yes	6
Great Britain	Yes	Yes	6
Hungary		Yes	2
Italy	Yes	Yes	6
Japan	Yes	Yes	6
Kazakhstan		Yes	2
Latvia		Yes	2
New Zealand	Yes	Yes	4
Nigeria	Yes	Yes	6
Norway	Yes	Yes	6
Qatar		Yes	2
Slovenia		Yes	2
South Korea	Yes	Yes	6
Sweden	Yes	Yes	6
Switzerland	Yes	Yes	6
Turkey	Yes	Yes	6
Ukraine		Yes	2
United States	Yes	Yes	6
Total: 24 NOCs	16	24	106

- Brazil. Denmark and New Zealand's mixed doubles pair will consist of athletes who also will be competing at the Mixed Team Event.

=== Mixed teams ===
Region	Quota(s)	Qualified
Host Nation	1	South Korea
Africa	1	Nigeria
Americas	3	United States; Canada; Brazil
Asia	2	China; Japan
Europe	6	Great Britain; Norway; Germany; Switzerland; Sweden; Turkey
Oceania	1	New Zealand
Wild Cards	2	Italy; Denmark
Total	16	

=== Mixed doubles ===
Region	Quota(s)	Qualified
Host Nation	1	South Korea
Africa	1	Nigeria
Americas	3	United States; Canada; Brazil
Asia	3	China; Japan; Qatar
Europe	9	Great Britain; Norway; Germany; Switzerland; Sweden; Turkey; Italy; Denmark; Latvia
Oceania	1	New Zealand
Six Wildcards	6	Austria; Czech Republic; Ukraine; Hungary; Slovenia; Kazakhstan
Total	24	
