= Bobsleigh at the 2024 Winter Youth Olympics – Women's monobob =

Women's monobob at the IV Winter Youth Olympic Games
- Venue: Alpensia Sliding Centre
- Dates: 22 January 2024
- Competitors: 12 from 9 nations
- Winning time: 1:53.31

Medalists
1st place, gold medalist(s)		Maja Voigt	Denmark
2nd place, silver medalist(s)		Agnese Campeol	Thailand
3rd place, bronze medalist(s)		Mihaela Alexia Anton	Romania

The women's monobob competition at the 2024 Winter Youth Olympics took place on 22 January at the Alpensia Sliding Centre.

== Results ==
The first run was held at 14:30 and the second run at 15:26.

Rank	Start No.	Athlete	Country	Run 1	Rank 1	Run 2	Rank 2	Total	Behind
1st place, gold medalist(s)	1	Maja Voigt	Denmark	56.19	1	57.12	1	1:53.31	
2nd place, silver medalist(s)	5	Agnese Campeol	Thailand	56.84	2	57.33	3	1:54.17	+0.86
3rd place, bronze medalist(s)	3	Mihaela Alexia Anton	Romania	57.15	6	57.19	2	1:54.34	+1.03
4	4	Amēlija Kotāne	Latvia	56.84	2	57.70	5	1:54.54	+1.23
5	8	Kate Prudāne	Latvia	57.08	4	57.73	6	1:54.81	+1.50
6	7	Georgiana Olaru	Romania	57.60	8	57.60	4	1:55.20	+1.89
7	6	Choi Si-yeon	South Korea	57.30	7	57.92	7	1:55.22	+1.91
8	2	Emily Bradley	United States	57.08	4	58.35	11	1:55.43	+2.12
9	9	Talia Melun	Canada	57.99	10	58.07	9	1:56.06	+2.75
10	12	Beya Mokrani	Tunisia	57.78	9	58.50	12	1:56.28	+2.97
11	10	Adanna Johnson	Jamaica	58.12	11	58.17	10	1:56.29	+2.98
12	11	Sophie Ghorbal	Tunisia	58.35	12	57.96	8	1:56.31	+3.00
