= Maja Voigt =

Danish bobsledder (born 2007)

Personal information
- Full name: Maja Børregaard Voigt
- Nationality: Danish
- Born: 16 August 2007 (age 19) Gentofte, Denmark
- Height: 177 cm (5.81 ft)
- Weight: 74 kg (163 lb)

Sport
- Country: Danish
- Sport: Bobsleigh
- Events: Monobob, Two-woman
- Turned pro: 2020
Medal record
Women's bobsleigh
Representing Denmark
Youth Olympic Games
Gold medal – first place	2024 Gangwon	Monobob
Junior European Championships
Silver medal – second place	2026 Innsbruck	Monobob

Maja Børregaard Voigt (born 16 August 2007) is a Danish bobsledder. She is the first bobsledder to represent Denmark in the Winter Olympics, having been selected for the 2026 games.

== Career ==
Prior to bobsled, Voigt was a track and field athlete competing as a sprinter. She switched to bobsleigh in 2020. At the youth level, Voigt found success. In the IBSF's Youth Series in 2023, Voigt won all events that she started. At the 2024 Winter Youth Olympics, Voigt took the gold medal in the monobob event. Voigt began competing in the Bobsleigh World Cup beginning in 2025, and expanded to also compete in two-woman events.

In 2026, Voigt was named part of Denmark's team for the 2026 Winter Olympics, making her the first ever bobsledder for Denmark in any winter games. She was also the youngest bobsledder present at the 2026 games. She participated in the monobob event, where she finished 9th.

== Bobsleigh results ==
All results are sourced from the International Bobsleigh and Skeleton Federation (IBSF).

=== Olympic Games ===
Event	Monobob
(Italy) 2026 Milano Cortina	9th
