= Gangneung Hockey Centre =

Indoor arena in South Korea

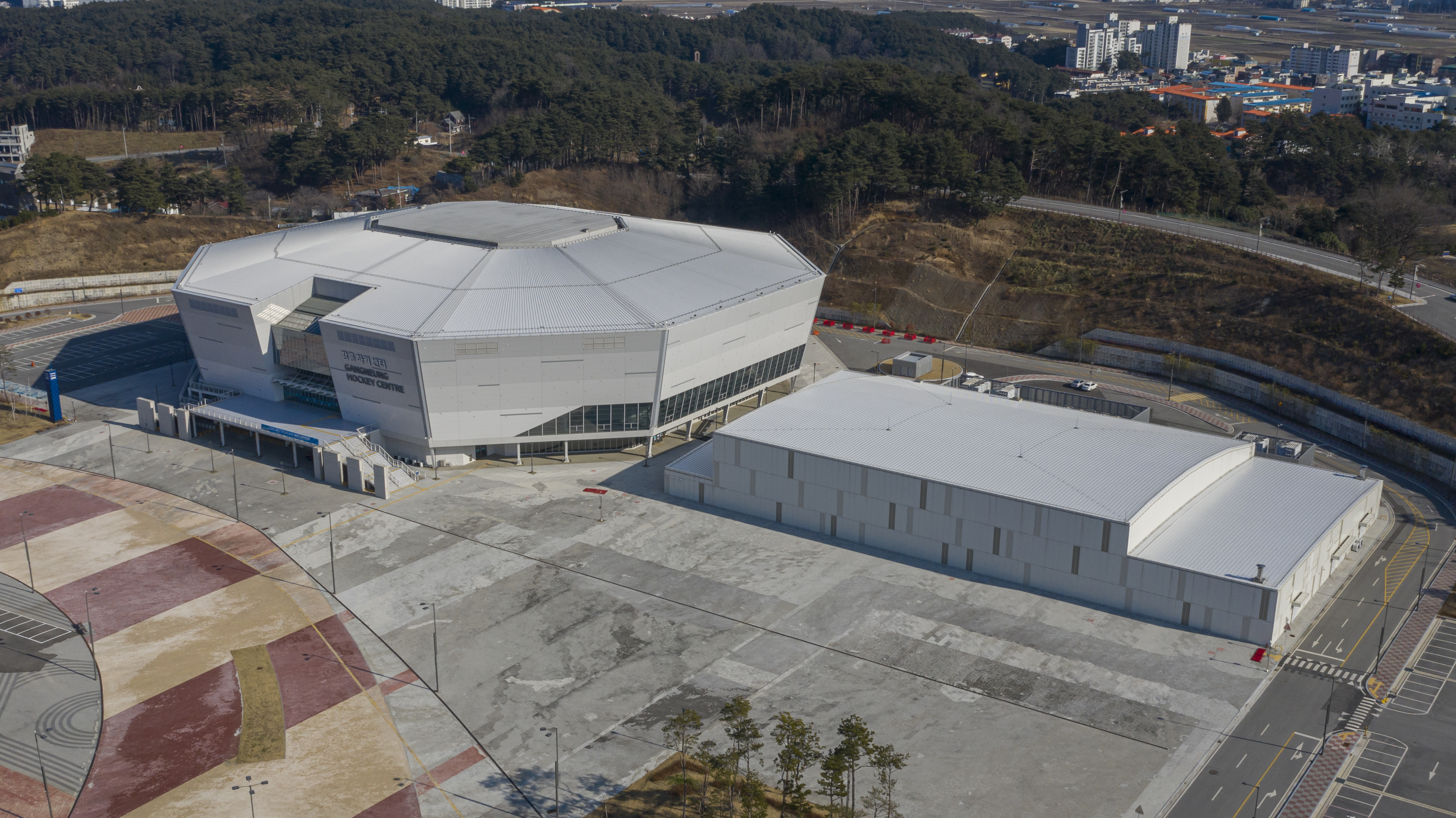
- 2018 Olympics Gangneung Ice Arena, Pyeongchang, South Korea
- Interactive map of Gangneung Hockey Centre
- Location: Gangneung, South Korea
- Coordinates: 37°46′34″N 128°54′05″E
- Capacity: 10,000

Construction
- Groundbreaking: 2014
- Opened: 2016
- Cost: 108 billion won

Gangneung Hockey Centre (Korean: 강릉 아이스하키 경기장) is an indoor arena located in the coastal city of Gangneung, South Korea. The arena was one of the two venues for the ice hockey events at the 2018 Winter Olympics, serving as the main venue for the men's tournament and medal matches. It also hosted the ice sledge hockey competition during the 2018 Winter Paralympics.

The cost of construction for the venue was estimated to be 108 billion won (about $90 million US). Construction started in July 2014 and was completed in March 2017.

Korea Ice Hockey Association president Chung Mong-won stated a desire for the Gangneung Hockey Centre to become the focus of ice hockey in Korea, and to leave an Olympic Games legacy. He said, "My dream is to turn Gangneung into a hockey town. I hope to see the day when people think of Gangneung, they'll think of hockey". In 2019, the Korea Ice Hockey Association voted to run its national development programs in Gangneung.

== See also ==
- List of indoor arenas in South Korea
