= Alpine skiing at the 2024 Winter Youth Olympics – Men's slalom =

Men's slalom at the IV Winter Youth Olympic Games
- Venue: High1 Resort, South Korea
- Date: 25 January 2024
- Competitors: 78 from 59 nations
- Winning time: 1:38.61

Medalists
1st place, gold medalist(s)		Zak Carrick-Smith	Great Britain
2nd place, silver medalist(s)		Elliot Westlund	Sweden
3rd place, bronze medalist(s)		Nash Huot-Marchand	France

The men's Slalom competition of the 2024 Winter Youth Olympics was held at the High1 Resort, Jeongseon, South Korea, on Thursday, 25 January 2024.

== Results ==
The first run was started at 10:45 and the second run was started at 14:45.

Rank	Bib	Name	Country	Run 1	Rank	Run 2	Rank	Total	Diff
1st place, gold medalist(s)	6	Zak Carrick-Smith	Great Britain	46.56	3	52.05	3	1:38.61	
2nd place, silver medalist(s)	11	Elliot Westlund	Sweden	46.45	2	52.21	4	1:38.66	+0.05
3rd place, bronze medalist(s)	8	Nash Huot-Marchand	France	47.14	4	51.73	1	1:38.87	+0.26
4	2	Neo Kamada	Japan	48.15	9	51.94	2	1:40.09	+1.48
5	16	Jevin Palmquist	United States	47.64	8	52.51	5	1:40.15	+1.54
6	10	Leo Scherer	Slovakia	47.59	7	52.72	7	1:40.31	+1.70
7	18	Edoardo Simonelli	Italy	48.33	14	52.56	6	1:40.90	+2.29
8	23	Pietro Scesa	Italy	48.26	11	53.02	10	1:41.28	+2.67
9	12	Nicolás Quintero	Argentina	48.59	17	53.01	9	1:41.60	+2.99
10	17	Stewart Bruce	United States	48.74	21	52.97	8	1:41.71	+3.10
11	27	Altti Pyrrö	Finland	48.38	15	53.55	12	1:41.93	+3.32
12	20	Ziggy Vrdoljak	Croatia	48.65	20	53.97	13	1:42.62	+4.01
13	29	Jaka Škrjanc	Slovenia	49.37	25	53.42	11	1:42.79	+4.18
14	26	Yanis Häusermann	Switzerland	48.74	21	54.25	16	1:42.99	+4.38
15	41	Christos Bouas	Belgium	49.85	29	54.12	14	1:43.97	+5.36
16	45	Noah Gianesini	Liechtenstein	49.98	30	54.28	17	1:44.26	+5.65
17	28	Romain Monney	Switzerland	50.15	31	54.22	15	1:44.37	+5.76
18	36	Gerónimo Castro	Chile	49.74	27	56.19	20	1:45.93	+7.32
19	59	Rostislav Khohlov	Kazakhstan	50.58	35	55.80	19	1:46.38	+7.77
20	50	Milan Schneider	Hungary	50.35	33	56.68	22	1:47.03	+8.42
21	54	Emeric Guerrillot	Portugal	50.69	36	56.39	21	1:47.08	+8.47
22	47	Max Kelly	Australia	51.41	37	55.77	18	1:47.18	+8.57
23	48	Thomas Kaan Onol Lang	Turkey	51.92	40	56.74	23	1:48.66	+10.05
24	46	Aleksa Lalić	Serbia	51.70	38	57.36	24	1:49.06	+10.45
25	55	Dagur Ýmir Sveinsson	Iceland	51.95	41	57.52	27	1:49.47	+10.86
26	52	Alexandru Matei Oancea	Romania	52.30	44	57.50	25	1:49.80	+11.19
27	62	Finlay Wilson	Ireland	51.86	39	58.01	28	1:49.87	+11.26
28	56	Hugo Leonelli	Monaco	52.56	45	57.51	26	1:50.07	+11.46
29	44	Apostolos Vougioukas	Greece	52.29	43	58.23	29	1:50.52	+11.91
30	60	Luca Poberai	Lithuania	53.34	47	58.35	30	1:51.69	+13.08
31	61	Rauan Raimkulov	Uzbekistan	53.59	50	59.08	31	1:52.67	+14.06
32	57	Oleksandr Patsahan	Ukraine	53.10	46	59.75	33	1:52.85	+14.24
33	53	Branislav Peković	Montenegro	53.48	49	1:00.03	35	1:53.51	+14.90
34	70	Henri Rivers IV	Jamaica	54.96	52	59.37	32	1:54.33	+15.72
35	73	Issa Laborde Dit Pere	Kenya	56.18	53	59.85	34	1:56.03	+17.42
36	68	Chi Hao Lucas Wong	Hong Kong	57.11	54	1:03.56	36	2:00.67	+22.06
37	67	Mattia Beccari	San Marino	57.52	55	1:06.06	37	2:03.58	+24.97
38	64	Alexander Astridge	United Arab Emirates	58.44	57	1:07.06	38	2:05.50	+26.89
39	74	Pattarapol Saengdaeng	Thailand	1:02.04	59	1:11.04	39	2:13.08	+34.47
40	76	Manlaijav Myangaibaatar	Mongolia	1:11.90	62	1:17.66	40	2:29.56	+50.95
	4	Liam Liljenborg	Sweden	46.04	1	Did not finish			
	5	Jonas Feichter	Italy	47.20	5	Did not finish			
	7	Florian Neumayer	Austria	48.16	10	Did not finish			
	14	Miha Oserban	Slovenia	47.57	6	Did not finish			
	15	Thomas Carnahan	Canada	48.44	16	Did not finish			
	19	Gal Hajdinjak	Slovenia	48.96	23	Did not finish			
	21	Andrej Barnáš	Slovakia	48.59	17	Did not finish			
	25	Romeo Rogue	France	48.64	19	Did not finish			
	31	Zacchaeus Poulsen	France	48.26	11	Did not finish			
	33	Hemi Meikle	New Zealand	50.54	34	Did not finish			
	35	Salvador Cornella Guitart	Andorra	49.77	28	Did not finish			
	37	Stanislav Kovář	Czech Republic	50.24	32	Did not finish			
	39	Kim Joo-hyoun	South Korea	49.61	26	Did not finish			
	43	Pauls Pēteris Pracans	Latvia	53.47	48	Did not finish			
	49	Lee Hyun-ho	South Korea	52.11	42	Did not finish			
	58	Timur Shakirov	Kyrgyzstan	54.27	51	Did not finish			
	66	Hakob Hakobyan	Armenia	1:02.30	60	Did not finish			
	72	Ali Boloukat	Iran	59.65	58	Did not finish			
	75	Sahil Thakur	India	1:07.14	61	Did not finish			
	9	Lars Horvath	Germany	48.26	11	Disqualified			
	34	Robert Clarke	Switzerland	49.18	24	Disqualified			
	71	Wang Shuai	China	57.80	56	Disqualified			
	78	Chhowang Mingyur Tamang	Nepal	1:43.25	63	Disqualified			
	1	Alexander Ax Swartz	Sweden	Did not finish					
	3	Benno Brandis	Germany	Did not finish					
	13	Asaja Sturm	Austria	Did not finish					
	22	Stanisław Sarzyński	Poland	Did not finish					
	24	Urho Rechardt	Finland	Did not finish					
	30	Atanas Petrov	Bulgaria	Did not finish					
	32	Kim Se-hyun	South Korea	Did not finish					
	38	Daniel Palič	Slovakia	Did not finish					
	40	Markus Mesila	Estonia	Did not finish					
	42	Leon Hafner	Austria	Did not finish					
	51	Noah Miljković	Bosnia and Herzegovina	Did not finish					
	65	Andreas Kashiouris	Cyprus	Did not finish					
	69	Alexandre El Hayek	Lebanon	Did not finish					
	63	Arthur Padilha	Brazil	Disqualified					
	77	Abderrahmane Bouderbala	Algeria	Did not start					
