= Alpine skiing at the 2024 Winter Youth Olympics – Men's giant slalom =

Men's giant slalom at the IV Winter Youth Olympic Games
- Venue: High1 Resort, South Korea
- Date: 24 January 2024
- Competitors: 79 from 60 nations
- Winning time: 1:34.37

Medalists
1st place, gold medalist(s)		Nash Huot-Marchand	France
2nd place, silver medalist(s)		Zak Carrick-Smith	Great Britain
3rd place, bronze medalist(s)		Florian Neumayer	Austria

The men's Giant slalom competition of the 2024 Winter Youth Olympics was held at the High1 Resort, Jeongseon, South Korea, on Wednesday, 24 January 2024.

== Results ==
The first run was started at 10:00 and the second run was started at 12:45.

Rank	Bib	Name	Country	Run 1	Rank	Run 2	Rank	Total	Diff
1st place, gold medalist(s)	2	Nash Huot-Marchand	France	48.88	2	45.49	1	1:34.37	
2nd place, silver medalist(s)	12	Zak Carrick-Smith	Great Britain	49.22	4	46.08	5	1:35.30	+0.93
3rd place, bronze medalist(s)	11	Florian Neumayer	Austria	49.80	7	45.57	2	1:35.37	+1.00
4	4	Leo Scherer	Germany	50.22	11	45.72	3	1:35.94	+1.57
5	8	Jonas Feichter	Italy	49.95	9	46.16	6	1:36.11	+1.74
6	26	Andrej Barnáš	Slovakia	50.29	12	46.42	10	1:36.71	+2.34
7	16	Asaja Sturm	Austria	51.17	21	45.75	4	1:36.92	+2.55
8	37	Jevin Palmquist	United States	50.86	16	46.26	8	1:37.12	+2.75
9	20	Zacchaeus Poulsen	France	50.93	18	46.32	9	1:37.25	+2.88
10	22	Stewart Bruce	United States	50.67	15	46.60	14	1:37.27	+2.90
11	6	Leon Hafner	Austria	49.32	5	48.02	24	1:37.34	+2.97
12	28	Romeo Rogue	France	50.66	14	46.69	15	1:37.35	+2.98
13	29	Robert Clarke	Switzerland	50.95	19	46.50	13	1:37.45	+3.08
14	25	Romain Monney	Switzerland	50.57	13	46.99	18	1:47.56	+3.19
15	39	Noah Gianesini	Liechtenstein	51.47	25	46.18	7	1:47.65	+3.28
16	23	Lars Horvath	Germany	50.97	20	46.70	16	1:37.67	+3.30
17	17	Neo Kamada	Japan	51.31	24	46.42	10	1:37.73	+3.36
18	38	Atanas Petrov	Bulgaria	51.72	27	46.43	12	1:38.15	+3.78
19	21	Nicolás Quintero	Argentina	50.89	17	47.70	21	1:38.59	+4.22
20	18	Kim Se-hyun	South Korea	51.22	23	47.43	20	1:38.65	+4.28
21	31	Ziggy Vrdoljak	Croatia	51.86	30	46.97	17	1:38.83	+4.46
22	33	Hemi Meikle	New Zealand	51.73	28	47.25	19	1:38.98	+4.61
22	24	Urho Rechardt	Finland	51.18	22	47.80	22	1:38.98	+4.61
24	35	Jaka Škrjanc	Slovenia	51.93	31	47.86	23	1:39.79	+5.42
25	43	Aleksa Lalić	Serbia	52.02	32	48.27	27	1:40.29	+5.92
26	49	Kim Joo-hyoun	South Korea	52.50	36	48.12	25	1:40.62	+6.25
27	36	Daniel Palič	Slovakia	52.53	37	48.55	29	1:41.08	+6.71
28	52	Luca Poberai	Lithuania	53.00	42	48.13	26	1:41.13	+6.76
28	46	Lee Hyun-ho	South Korea	52.68	38	48.45	28	1:41.13	+6.76
30	44	Christos Bouas	Belgium	52.27	34	48.93	33	1:41.20	+6.83
31	41	Salvador Cornella Guitart	Andorra	52.85	40	48.78	32	1:41.63	+7.26
32	56	Finlay Wilson	Ireland	53.10	43	48.70	30	1:41.80	+7.43
33	57	Rostislav Khokhlov	Kazakhstan	53.36	44	48.75	31	1:42.11	+7.74
33	42	Apostolos Vougioukas	Greece	52.88	41	49.23	36	1:42.11	+7.74
35	54	Hugo Leonelli	Monaco	53.52	45	49.00	35	1:42.52	+8.15
36	63	Timur Shakirov	Kyrgyzstan	53.83	46	48.95	34	1:42.78	+8.41
37	62	Issa Laborde Dit Pere	Kenya	54.12	48	50.09	37	1:44.21	+9.84
38	64	Rauan Raimkulov	Uzbekistan	54.43	50	51.11	39	1:45.54	+11.17
39	61	Paula Pēteris Pracans	Latvia	56.65	53	50.99	38	1:47.64	+13.27
40	66	Arthur Padilla	Brazil	58.54	55	52.45	40	1:50.99	+16.62
41	60	Wang Shuai	China	59.33	56	54.38	42	1:53.71	+19.34
42	69	Alexandre El Hayek	Lebanon	1:00.16	57	53.83	41	1:53.99	+19.62
43	72	Chi Hao Lucas Wong	Hong Kong	1:00.43	58	56.72	45	1:57.15	+22.78
44	70	Hakob Hakobyan	Armenia	1:01.61	59	56.08	44	1:57.69	+23.32
45	73	Ali Boloukat	Iran	1:04.21	60	54.87	43	1:59.08	+24.71
46	74	Pattarapol Saengdaeng	Thailand	1:04.58	61	56.92	46	2:01.50	+27.13
47	78	Sahil Thakur	India	1:04.67	62	57.85	47	2:02.52	+28.15
48	75	Manlaijav Myangaibaatar	Mongolia	1:05.45	63	1:01.50	48	2:06.95	+32.58
49	76	Abderrahmane Bouderbala	Algeria	1:09.47	64	1:02.79	49	2:12.26	+37.89
50	77	Chhowang Mingyur Tamang	Nepal	1:33.63	65	1:27.52	50	3:01.15	+1:26.78
	1	Liam Liljenborg	Sweden	48.54	1	Did not finish			
	5	Benno Brandis	Germany	50.02	10	Did not finish			
	9	Edoardo Simonelli	Italy	49.93	8	Did not finish			
	16	Stanisław Sarzyński	Poland	49.58	6	Did not finish			
	27	Yanis Häusermann	Switzerland	51.71	26	Did not finish			
	34	Stanislav Kovář	Czech Republic	52.29	35	Did not finish			
	45	Markus Mesila	Estonia	53.86	47	Did not finish			
	47	Emeric Guerrillot	Portugal	52.75	39	Did not finish			
	51	Thomas Kaan Onol Lang	Turkey	54.59	51	Did not finish			
	53	Milan Schneider	Hungary	52.20	33	Did not finish			
	55	Oleksandr Patsahan	Ukraine	55.14	52	Did not finish			
	59	Dagur Ýmir Sveinsson	Iceland	54.39	49	Did not finish			
	65	Klos Vokshi	Kosovo	58.34	54	Did not finish			
	7	Elliot Westlund	Sweden	49.21	3	Disqualified			
	40	Gal Hajdinjak	Slovenia	51.73	28	Disqualified			
	3	Miha Oserban	Slovenia	Did not finish					
	10	Alexander Ax Swartz	Sweden	Did not finish					
	13	Thomas Carnahan	Canada	Did not finish					
	14	Pietro Scesa	Italy	Did not finish					
	30	Gerónimo Castro	Chile	Did not finish					
	32	Max Kelly	Australia	Did not finish					
	48	Branislav Peković	Montenegro	Did not finish					
	50	Alexandru Matei Oancea	Romania	Did not finish					
	58	Noah Miljković	Bosnia and Herzegovina	Did not finish					
	67	Mattia Beccari	San Marino	Did not finish					
	68	Henri Rivers IV	Jamaica	Did not finish					
	71	Andreas Kashiouris	Cyprus	Did not finish					
	19	Altti Pyrrö	Finland	Did not start					
	79	Alexander Astridge	United Arab Emirates	Did not start					
