= Cross-country skiing at the 2024 Winter Youth Olympics – Men's 7.5 kilometre classical =

Men's 7.5 kilometre classical at the IV Winter Youth Olympic Games
- Venue: Alpensia Biathlon Centre
- Date: 30 January
- Competitors: 79 from 45 nations

Medalists
1st place, gold medalist(s)		Jakob Moch	Germany
2nd place, silver medalist(s)		Jonas Müller	Germany
3rd place, bronze medalist(s)		Quentin Lespine	France

The men's 7.5 kilometre classical cross-country skiing competition at the 2024 Winter Youth Olympics was held on 30 January at the Alpensia Biathlon Centre.

== Results ==
The race was held at 13:00.

Rank	Bib	Athlete	Country	Time	Deficit
1st place, gold medalist(s)	74	Jakob Moch	Germany	19:47.2	
2nd place, silver medalist(s)	66	Jonas Müller	Germany	19:52.6	+5.4
3rd place, bronze medalist(s)	59	Quentin Lespine	France	19:54.1	+6.9
4	33	Gaspard Cottaz	France	20:09.5	+22.3
5	79	Måns Ravald	Sweden	20:13.4	+26.2
6	76	Topias Vuorela	Finland	20:15.5	+28.3
7	73	Nolan Gertsch	Switzerland	20:15.8	+28.6
8	45	Eduard Simbartl	Czech Republic	20:21.7	+34.5
9	68	Marco Pinzani	Italy	20:22.4	+35.2
10	78	Federico Pozzi	Italy	20:23.0	+35.8
11	65	Benjamin Barbier	United States	20:26.3	+39.1
12	77	Tabor Greenberg	United States	20:29.4	+42.2
13	62	Maximilian Wanger	Switzerland	20:35.0	+47.8
14	44	Daniel Varikov	Estonia	20:39.4	+52.2
15	72	Kalle Tossavainen	Finland	20:44.6	+57.4
16	57	Aleš Řezáč	Czech Republic	20:45.6	+58.4
17	27	Milan Neukirchner	Germany	20:47.1	+59.9
18	52	Landon Wyatt	United States	20:48.5	+1:01.3
19	34	Cédric Martel	Canada	20:48.9	+1:01.7
19	69	Niccolo Bianchi	Italy	20:48.9	+1:01.7
21	67	Eamon Wilson	Canada	20:51.0	+1:03.8
22	17	Usukh-Ireedui Turbat	Mongolia	20:51.9	+1:04.7
23	41	Johan Calandry	France	20:55.1	+1:07.9
24	6	Elias Eischer	Austria	21:01.7	+1:14.5
25	64	Peio Anarbe	Spain	21:03.6	+1:16.4
26	4	Tine Šporn	Slovenia	21:05.8	+1:18.6
27	51	Michal Adamov	Slovakia	21:08.2	+1:21.0
28	20	Mihail Carpov	Moldova	21:13.1	+1:25.9
29	71	Kosuke Fujimoto	Japan	21:15.0	+1:27.8
30	45	Toni Andree Saarepuu	Estonia	21:21.5	+1:34.3
31	75	Tage Börjesson	Sweden	21:26.8	+1:39.6
32	54	Bohdan Nikulin	Ukraine	21:27.2	+1:40.0
33	58	Nazarii Teselskyi	Ukraine	21:30.2	+1:43.0
34	32	Elisey Kuzmin	Slovakia	21:36.4	+1:49.2
35	63	Berik Boranbayev	Kazakhstan	21:39.9	+1:52.7
36	61	Leevi Passila	Finland	21:40.2	+1:53.0
37	60	Jan Zwatrzko	Poland	21:41.4	+1:54.2
38	3	Niklas Walcher	Austria	21:51.0	+2:03.8
39	53	Lovrenc Karničar	Slovenia	21:56.0	+2:08.8
40	55	Aubakir Totanov	Kazakhstan	21:59.7	+2:12.5
41	31	Antoni Żółkiewski	Poland	22:00.0	+2:12.8
42	39	Khuslen Ariunjargal	Mongolia	22:01.7	+2:14.5
43	46	Ritvars Ļepeškins	Latvia	22:12.0	+2:24.8
44	5	Hjalti Böðvarsson	Iceland	22:14.3	+2:27.1
45	56	Karol Stachoń	Poland	22:29.8	+2:42.6
46	36	Janik Brunhart	Liechtenstein	22:40.3	+2:53.1
47	38	Thomas Duncan	Great Britain	22:42.1	+2:54.9
48	11	Clancy Merrick Harvey	Australia	22:43.1	+2:55.9
49	49	Kim Ga-on	South Korea	22:53.4	+3:06.2
50	40	Matas Gražys	Lithuania	23:11.4	+3:24.2
51	30	Justo Estévez	Argentina	23:13.1	+3:25.9
52	15	Samuel Johnson	Australia	23:19.4	+3:32.2
53	43	Ștefan Paul Gherghel	Romania	23:28.6	+3:41.4
54	42	Song Chan-min	South Korea	23:39.0	+3:51.8
55	23	Dani Cholakov	Bulgaria	23:48.0	+4:00.8
56	24	Matija Štimac	Croatia	24:13.8	+4:26.6
57	47	Kim Woo-suk	South Korea	24:17.7	+4:30.5
58	29	Patricio Meliñan	Chile	24:20.1	+4:32.9
59	28	Daujotas Jonikas	Lithuania	24:21.7	+4:34.5
60	9	Andrija Tošić	Serbia	24:23.8	+4:36.6
61	37	Boris Stanojević	Bosnia and Herzegovina	24:48.8	+5:01.6
62	12	Cristóbal Ríos	Chile	24:54.7	+5:07.5
63	14	Boris Štefančić	Croatia	24:59.3	+5:12.1
64	21	Martin Holló	Hungary	25:08.1	+5:20.9
65	2	Avery Balbanida	Philippines	25:15.9	+5:28.7
66	10	Armen Margaryan	Armenia	25:20.0	+5:32.8
67	26	Amir Mohammad Abolhassanzadeh	Iran	25:31.1	+5:43.9
68	22	Lee Chieh-han	Chinese Taipei	25:47.6	+6:00.4
69	19	Naravich Saisuk	Thailand	25:52.6	+6:05.4
70	50	David Torevski	North Macedonia	25:58.2	+6:11.0
71	16	Thanatip Bunrit	Thailand	26:31.2	+6:44.0
72	35	Marcelino Tawk	Lebanon	26:33.6	+6:46.4
73	8	Gabriel César Santos	Brazil	26:57.9	+7:10.7
74	7	Ian Francisco da Silva	Brazil	27:51.6	+8:04.4
75	18	Ioannis Georgakis	Greece	28:44.0	+8:56.8
76	13	Liu Hao-en	Chinese Taipei	28:44.1	+8:56.9
77	25	Evangelos Athanasiou	Greece	30:57.7	+11:10.5
78	1	Samuel Jaramillo	Colombia	33:34.7	+13:47.5
	70	Jēkabs Skolnieks	Latvia	DNS	
