= Cross-country skiing at the 2024 Winter Youth Olympics – 4 × 5 kilometre mixed relay =

4 × 5 kilometre mixed relay at the IV Winter Youth Olympic Games
- Venue: Alpensia Biathlon Centre
- Date: 1 February
- Competitors: 96 from 24 nations

Medalists
1st place, gold medalist(s)		Sarah Hofmann; Jonas Müller; Lena Einsiedler; Jakob Moch	Germany
2nd place, silver medalist(s)		Agathe Margreither; Gaspard Cottaz; Annette Coupat; Quentin Lespine	France
3rd place, bronze medalist(s)		Leandra Schöpfer; Nolan Gertsch; Ilaria Gruber; Maximilian Wanger	Switzerland

The 4 × 5 kilometre mixed relay cross-country skiing competition at the 2024 Winter Youth Olympics was held on 1 February at the Alpensia Biathlon Centre.

== Results ==
The race was held at 10:30.

Rank	Bib	Country	Athlete	Gender	Technique	Time	Deficit
1st place, gold medalist(s)	6	Germany	Sarah Hofmann; Jonas Müller; Lena Einsiedler; Jakob Moch	F M F M	C C F F	53:07.3; 15:03.2; 13:18.5; 13:06.9; 11:38.7	
2nd place, silver medalist(s)	2	France	Agathe Margreither; Gaspard Cottaz; Annette Coupat; Quentin Lespine	F M F M	C C F F	53:13.0; 15:12.1; 12:57.1; 13:19.0; 11:44.8	+5.7
3rd place, bronze medalist(s)	3	Switzerland	Leandra Schöpfer; Nolan Gertsch; Ilaria Gruber; Maximilian Wanger	F M F M	C C F F	53:13.3; 15:17.4; 12:54.0; 13:23.1; 11:38.8	+6.0
4	1	Sweden	Kajsa Johansson; Måns Ravald; Elsa Tänglander; Tage Börjesson	F M F M	C C F F	53:13.8; 15:11.8; 13:00.5; 13:14.8; 11:46.7	+6.5
5	5	United States	Rose Horning; Benjamin Barbier; Neve Gerard; Tabor Greenberg	F M F M	C C F F	54:02.0; 15:27.3; 13:26.6; 13:14.5; 11:53.6	+54.7
6	14	Canada	Leanne Gartner; Eamon Wilson; Aramintha Bradford; Cédric Martel	F M F M	C C F F	54:25.9; 15:33.6; 13:24.2; 13:11.6; 12:16.5	+1:18.6
7	4	Italy	Marie Schwitzer; Marco Pinzani; Vanessa Cagnati; Federico Pozzi	F M F M	C C F F	54:29.4; 15:50.8; 13:08.3; 13:41.7; 11:48.6	+1:22.1
8	2	Finland	Hanni Koski; Topias Vuorela; Nelli-Lotta Karppelin; Kalle Tossavainen	F M F M	C C F F	54:29.8; 15:50.4; 13:11.9; 13:17.0; 12:10.5	+1:22.5
9	11	Estonia	Gerda Kivil; Toni Andree Saarepuu; Herta Rajas; Daniel Varikov	F M F M	C C F F	55:22.4; 15:14.7; 13:33.6; 13:51.3; 12:42.8	+2:15.1
10	7	Czech Republic	Kateřina Dušková; Aleš Řezáč; Eliška Polonská; Eduard Simbartl	F M F M	C C F F	55:41.4; 15:15.2; 13:33.7; 14:15.8; 12:36.7	+2:34.1
11	18	Austria	Heidi Bucher; Niklas Walcher; Katharina Engelhardt; Elias Eischerl	F M F M	C C F F	55:54.1; 15:12.7; 14:28.1; 14:20.2; 11:53.1	+2:46.8
12	9	Ukraine	Mariia Pavlenko; Nazarii Teselskyi; Sofiia Shkatula; Bohdan Nikulin	F M F M	C C F F	57:13.4; 16:31.9; 13:43.3; 14:23.0; 12:35.2	+4:06.1
13	13	Slovakia	Emília Rendová; Elisey Kuzmin; Tereza Bukasová; Michal Adamov	F M F M	C C F F	57:18.7; 16:31.2; 14:11.5; 14:24.8; 12:11.2	+4:11.4
14	12	Poland	Julia Rucka; Antoni Żółkiewski; Klaudia Radomyska; Jan Zwatrzko	F M F M	C C F F	57:18.8; 16:16.0; 14:33.8; 14:17.5; 12:11.5	+4:11.5
15	19	Slovenia	Ula Kuhar; Tine Šporn; Zala Zupan; Lovrenc Karničar	F M F M	C C F F	58:40.0; 16:12.2; 14:02.8; 14:42.5; 13:42.5	+5:32.7
16	8	Kazakhstan	Milana Mamedova; Berik Boranbayev; Violetta Mitropolskaya; Aubakir Totanov	F M F M	C C F F	58:57.4; 17:44.8; 13:47.5; 14:37.4; 12:47.7	+5:50.1
17	15	Latvia	Linda Kaparkalēja; Jēkabs Skolnieks; Martīne Djatkoviča; Ritvars Ļepeškins	F M F M	C C F F	59:00.0; 16:57.8; 13:57.8; 15:13.4; 12:51.0	+5:52.7
18	24	Australia	Rosie Franzke; Clancy Merrick Harvey; Satara Moon; Samuel Johnson	F M F M	C C F F	59:40.8; 17:00.3; 14:27.9; 14:40.0; 13:32.6	+6:33.5
19	21	Mongolia	Nandintsetseg Naranbat; Usukh-Ireedui Turbat; Uyanga Jamyanjav; Khuslen Ariunjargal	F M F M	C C F F	1:00:27.6; 17:07.2; 13:41.6; 15:51.2; 13:47.6	+7:20.3
20	17	South Korea	Heo Bu-gyeong; Kim Ga-on; Kang Han-eul; Kim Woo-suk	F M F M	C C F F	1:02:00.1; 17:03.7; 14:22.8; 16:58.4; 13:35.2	+8:52.8
21	20	Croatia	Chiara Gašparac; Matija Štimac; Nives Barićevac; Boris Štefančić	F M F M	C C F F	1:03:59.8; 18:24.6; 15:09.6; 16:39.6; 13:46.0	+10:52.5
22	16	Greece	Christina Roza; Ioannis Georgakis; Georgia Tsiarka; Evangelos Athanasiou	F M F M	C C F F	1:08:50.6; 19:58.7; 17:09.1; 16:55.2; 14:47.6	+15:43.3
23	22	Thailand	Kingkan Duangjumpa; Naravich Saisuk; Kanyawat Limsamutchaikul; Thanatip Bunrit	F M F M	C C F F	1:10:17.0; 21:02.2; 16:08.6; 17:42.5; 15:23.7	+17:09.7
24	23	Brazil	Julia Reis; Gabriel César Santos; Mariana Lopes da Silva; Ian Francisco da Silva	F M F M	C C F F	1:12:04.7; 19:56.4; 17:40.7; 18:41.6; 15:46.0	+18:57.4
