= Nepal at the 2024 Winter Youth Olympics =

- Flag of Nepal
- IOC code: NEP
- NOC: Nepal Olympic Committee

in Gangwon, South Korea 19 January 2024 – 1 February 2024
- Competitors: 2 in 1 sport
- Flag bearer (opening): Chhowang Mingyur Tamang
- Flag bearer (closing): TBD
- Medals: Gold 0 Silver 0 Bronze 0 Total 0

Winter Youth Olympics appearances
- 2012; 2016; 2020; 2024

Nepal competed at the 2024 Winter Youth Olympics in Gangwon, South Korea, from January 19 to February 1, 2024. This was Nepal's third appearance at the Winter Youth Olympic Games, having debuted at the Games at the first edition in 2012.

The Nepalese team consisted of two alpine skiers (one per gender). Alpine skier Chhowang Mingyur Tamang was the country's flagbearer during the opening ceremony.

== Competitors ==
The following is the list of number of competitors (per gender) participating at the games per sport/discipline.

Sport	Men	Women	Total
Alpine skiing	1	1	2
Total	1	1	2

== Alpine skiing ==
Nepal qualified two alpine skiers (one per gender).

Athlete	Event	Run 1		Run 2		Total	
Athlete	Event	Time	Rank	Time	Rank	Time	Rank
Chhowang Mingyur Tamang	Men's super-G	—N/a				DNS	
Chhowang Mingyur Tamang	Men's giant slalom	1:33.63	65	1:27.52	50	3:01.15	50
Chhowang Mingyur Tamang	Men's slalom	1:43.25	63	DQ		DNF	
Laxmi Rai	Women's super-G	—N/a				DNS	
Laxmi Rai	Women's giant slalom	1:32.34	53	1:42.40	43	3:14.74	43
Laxmi Rai	Women's slalom	DNF					

== See also ==
- Nepal at the 2024 Summer Olympics
