= Iceland at the 2024 Winter Youth Olympics =

- Flag of Iceland
- IOC code: ISL
- NOC: Icelandic Olympic Committee

in Gangwon, South Korea 19 January 2024 – 1 February 2024
- Competitors: 7 in 3 sports
- Flag bearers: Dagur Ýmir Sveinsson & Eyrún Erla Gestsdóttir
- Medals: Gold 0 Silver 0 Bronze 0 Total 0

Winter Youth Olympics appearances
- 2012; 2016; 2020; 2024

Iceland compete at the 2024 Winter Youth Olympics in Gangwon, South Korea, from 19 January to 1 February 2024. This was Iceland's fourth appearance at the Winter Youth Olympic Games, having competed at every Games since the inaugural edition in 2012.

The Icelandic team consisted of six athletes (three men and four women) competing in three sports. Alpine skiers Dagur Ýmir Sveinsson and Eyrún Erla Gestsdóttir were the country's flagbearers during the opening ceremony.

== Competitors ==
The following is the list of number of competitors (per gender) participating at the games per sport/discipline.

Sport	Men	Women	Total
Alpine skiing	1	2	3
Cross-country skiing	1	1	2
Snowboarding	1	1	2
Total	3	4	7

== Alpine skiing ==
Iceland qualified three alpine skiers (one man and two women).

Men

Athlete	Event	Run 1		Run 2		Total	
Athlete	Event	Time	Rank	Time	Rank	Time	Rank
Dagur Ýmir Sveinsson	Men's giant slalom	54.39	49	Did not finish			
Dagur Ýmir Sveinsson	Men's slalom	51.95	41	57.52	27	1:49.47	25
Eyrún Erla Gestsdóttir	Women's giant slalom	Did not finish					
Eyrún Erla Gestsdóttir	Women's slalom	57.45	43	54.17	29	1:51.62	31
Þórdís Helga Grétarsdóttir	Women's giant slalom	54.29	31	59.62	31	1:53.91	29
Þórdís Helga Grétarsdóttir	Women's slalom	57.65	44	Did not finish			

== Cross-country skiing ==
Iceland qualified two cross-country skiers (one per gender).

Athlete	Event	Qualification		Quarterfinal		Semifinal		Final	
Athlete	Event	Time	Rank	Time	Rank	Time	Rank	Time	Rank
Hjalti Böðvarsson	Men's 7.5 km classical	—N/a						22:14.3	44
Hjalti Böðvarsson	Men's sprint freestyle	3:32.87	58	Did not advance					
María Kristín Ólafsdóttir	Women's 7.5 km classical	—N/a						28:12.8	54
María Kristín Ólafsdóttir	Women's sprint freestyle	4:21.18	59	Did not advance					

== Snowboarding ==
Iceland qualified two snowboarders (one per gender).

Slopestyle & Big Air

Athlete	Event	Qualification				Final				
Athlete	Event	Run 1	Run 2	Best	Rank	Run 1	Run 2	Run 3	Best	Rank
Júlíetta Iðunn Tómasdóttir	Women's big air	Did not start				Did not advance				

== See also ==
- Iceland at the 2024 Summer Olympics
