= Kosovo at the 2024 Winter Youth Olympics =

- Flag of Kosovo
- IOC code: KOS
- NOC: Olympic Committee of Kosovo

in Gangwon, South Korea 19 January 2024 – 1 February 2024
- Competitors: 2 in 1 sport
- Flag bearer (opening): Klos Vokshi & Lirika Deva
- Flag bearer (closing): TBD
- Medals: Gold 0 Silver 0 Bronze 0 Total 0

Winter Youth Olympics appearances (overview)
- 2020; 2024

Kosovo is scheduled to compete at the 2024 Winter Youth Olympics in Gangwon, South Korea, from January 19 to February 1, 2024, This will be Kosovo's second appearance at the Winter Youth Olympic Games, having debuted four years earlier.

The Kosovo team consisted of two alpine skiers (one per gender). Alpine skiers Klos Vokshi & Lirika Deva were the country's flagbearers during the opening ceremony.

== Competitors ==
The following is the list of number of competitors (per gender) participating at the games per sport/discipline.

Sport	Men	Women	Total
Alpine skiing	1	1	2
Total	1	1	2

== Alpine skiing ==
Kosovo qualified two alpine skiers (one per gender).

Athlete	Event	Run 1		Run 2		Total	
Athlete	Event	Time	Rank	Time	Rank	Time	Rank
Klos Vokshi	Men's giant slalom	58.34	54	DNF			
Lirika Deva	Women's giant slalom	56.08	38	58.79	29	1:54.87	31
Lirika Deva	Women's slalom	56.14	38	54.01	28	1:50.15	27

== See also ==
- Kosovo at the 2024 Summer Olympics
