= Armenia at the 2024 Winter Youth Olympics =

- Flag of Armenia
- IOC code: ARM
- NOC: Armenian Olympic Committee

in Gangwon, South Korea 19 January 2024 – 1 February 2024
- Competitors: 3 in 2 sports
- Flag bearer (opening): Hakob Hakobyan
- Flag bearer (closing): TBD
- Medals: Gold 0 Silver 0 Bronze 0 Total 0

Winter Youth Olympics appearances (overview)
- 2012; 2016; 2020; 2024

Armenia is scheduled to compete at the 2024 Winter Youth Olympics in Gangwon, South Korea, from January 19 to February 1, 2024. This will be Armenia's fourth appearance at the Winter Youth Olympic Games, having competed at every Games since the inaugural edition in 2012.

The Armenian team consisted of three athletes (two men and one woman) competing in two sports. Alpine skier Hakob Hakobyan was the country's flagbearer during the opening ceremony.

== Competitors ==
The following is the list of number of competitors (per gender) participating at the games per sport/discipline.

| Sport | Men | Women | Total |
|---|---|---|---|
| Alpine skiing | 1 | 0 | 1 |
| Cross-country skiing | 1 | 1 | 2 |
| Total | 2 | 1 | 3 |

== Alpine skiing ==
Armenia qualified one male alpine skier.

Men

| Athlete | Event | Run 1 | | Run 2 | | Total | |
| Athlete | Event | Time | Rank | Time | Rank | Time | Rank |
|---|---|---|---|---|---|---|---|
| Hakob Hakobyan | Super-G | —N/a | | | | DNS | |
| Hakob Hakobyan | Giant slalom | 1:01.61 | 59 | 56.08 | 44 | 1:57.69 | 44 |
| Hakob Hakobyan | Slalom | 1:02.30 | 60 | Did Not Finish | | | |

== Cross-country skiing ==
Armenia qualified two cross-country skiers (one per gender).

| Athlete | Event | Qualification | | Quarterfinal | | Semifinal | | Final | |
| Athlete | Event | Time | Rank | Time | Rank | Time | Rank | Time | Rank |
|---|---|---|---|---|---|---|---|---|---|
| Armen Margaryan | 7.5 km classical | —N/a | | | | | | 25:20.0 | 66 |
| Armen Margaryan | Sprint freestyle | 4:08.06 | 77 | Did not advance | | | | | |
| Fenya Galstyan | 7.5 km classical | —N/a | | | | | | 28:51.9 | 56 |
| Fenya Galstyan | Sprint freestyle | 4:54.86 | 71 | Did not advance | | | | | |

== See also ==
- Armenia at the 2024 Summer Olympics
