= Kyrgyzstan at the 2024 Winter Youth Olympics =

- Flag of Kyrgyzstan
- IOC code: KGZ
- NOC: National Olympic Committee of the Kyrgyz Republic

in Gangwon, South Korea 19 January 2024 – 1 February 2024
- Competitors: 3 in 3 sports
- Flag bearer (opening): Artur Saparbekov
- Flag bearer (closing): TBD
- Medals: Gold 0 Silver 0 Bronze 0 Total 0

Winter Youth Olympics appearances (overview)
- 2012; 2016; 2020; 2024

Kyrgyzstan is scheduled to compete at the 2024 Winter Youth Olympics in Gangwon, South Korea, from 19 January to 1 February 2024, This will be Kyrgyzstan's fourth appearance at the Winter Youth Olympic Games, having competed at every Games since the inaugural edition in 2012.

The Kyrgyzstan team consisted of three athletes (two men and one woman) competing in three sports. Biathlete and cross-country skier Artur Saparbekov was the country's flagbearer during the opening ceremony.

== Competitors ==
The following is the list of number of competitors (per gender) participating at the games per sport/discipline.

Sport	Men	Women	Total
Alpine skiing	1	1	2
Biathlon	1	0	1
Cross-country skiing	1	0	1
Total	2 (Note: A single athlete, Artur Saparbekov, will represent Kyrgyzstan in biathlon and cross-country skiing competitions.)	1	3

== Alpine skiing ==
Kyrgyzstan qualified two alpine skiers (one per gender).

Athlete	Event	Run 1		Run 2		Total	
Athlete	Event	Time	Rank	Time	Rank	Time	Rank
Timur Shakirov	Super-G	—N/a				59.67	46
Timur Shakirov	Giant slalom	53.83	46	48.95	34	1:42.78	36
Timur Shakirov	Slalom	54.27	51	DNF			
Timur Shakirov	Combined	58.92	44	DNF			
Albina Ivanova	Giant slalom	DNF					
Albina Ivanova	Slalom	1:06.86	56	1:02.83	41	2:09.69	41

== Biathlon ==
Kyrgyzstan qualified one male biathlete.

Men

Athlete	Event	Time	Misses	Rank
Artur Saparbekov	Sprint	29:38.6	8 (5+3)	91
Artur Saparbekov	Individual	55:44.1	9 (2+2+4+1)	87

== Cross-country skiing ==
Kyrgyzstan qualified one male cross-country skier.

Men

Athlete	Event	Qualification		Quarterfinal		Semifinal		Final	
Athlete	Event	Time	Rank	Time	Rank	Time	Rank	Time	Rank
Artur Saparbekov	Sprint freestyle	3:34.07	60	Did not advance					

== See also ==
- Kyrgyzstan at the 2024 Summer Olympics
