= Alpine skiing at the 2020 Winter Youth Olympics – Boys' slalom =

Boys' slalom at the III Winter Youth Olympic Games
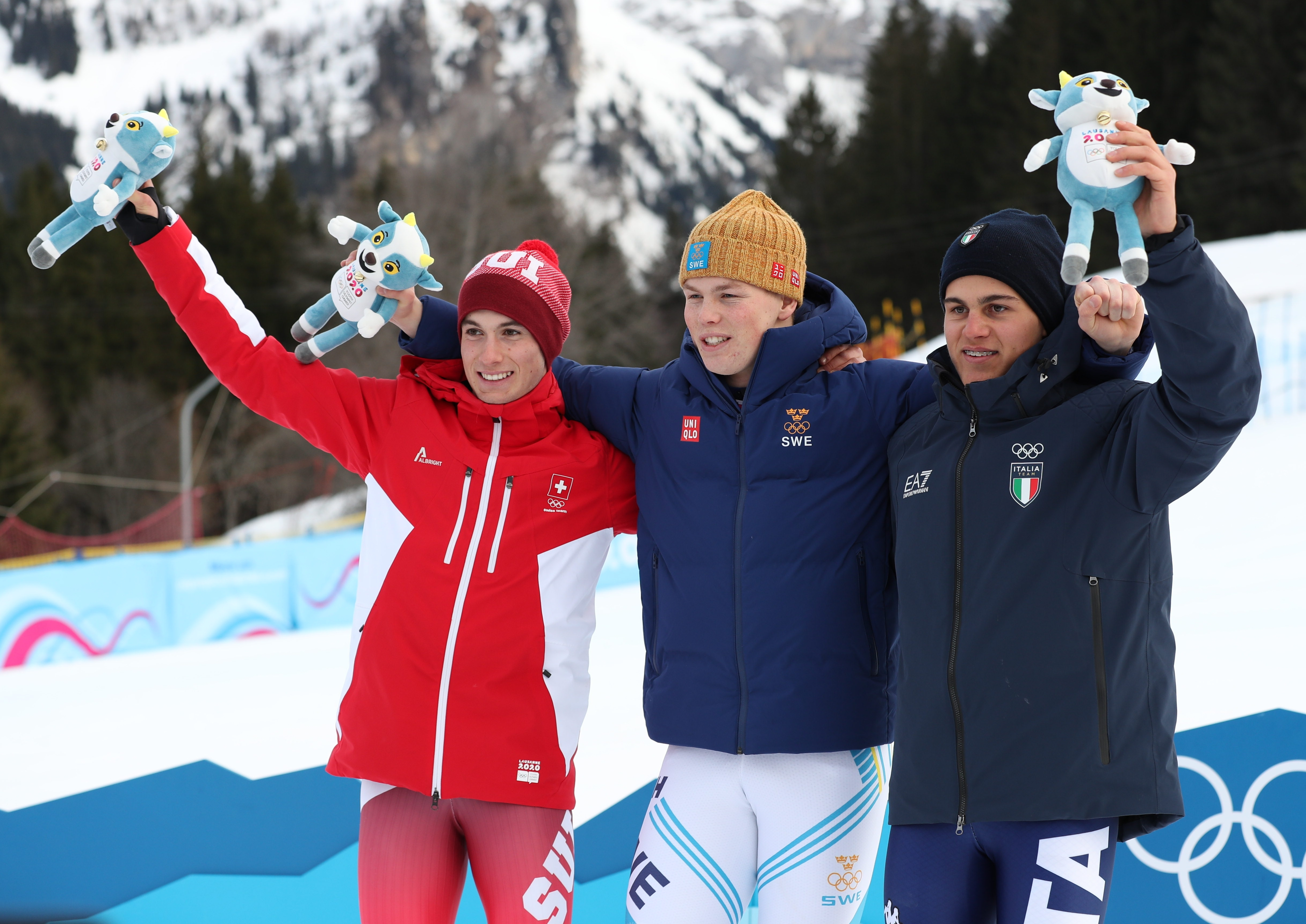
- Venue: Les Diablerets, Switzerland
- Date: 14 January
- Competitors: 77 from 55 nations
- Winning time: 1:16.10

Medalists
1st place, gold medalist(s)		Adam Hofstedt	Sweden
2nd place, silver medalist(s)		Luc Roduit	Switzerland
3rd place, bronze medalist(s)		Edoardo Saracco	Italy

The boys' slalom competition of the 2020 Winter Youth Olympics was held at the Les Diablerets Alpine Centre, Switzerland, on 14 January.

== Results ==
The race was started at 11:30 (Run 1) and 15:00 (Run 2).

Rank	Bib	Name	Country	Run 1	Rank	Run 2	Rank	Total	Diff.
1st place, gold medalist(s)	4	Adam Hofstedt	Sweden	36.08	1	40.02	3	1:16.10	
2nd place, silver medalist(s)	13	Luc Roduit	Switzerland	37.24	4	40.18	4	1:17.42	+1.32
3rd place, bronze medalist(s)	22	Edoardo Saracco	Italy	36.81	2	40.97	12	1:17.78	+1.68
4	1	Oskar Gillberg	Sweden	37.90	8	39.98	2	1:17.88	+1.78
5	17	Tvrtko Ljutić	Croatia	37.46	6	40.45	7	1:17.91	+1.81
6	9	Marco Abbruzzese	Italy	38.06	9	39.87	1	1:17.93	+1.83
7	27	Marinus Sennhofer	Germany	37.88	7	40.20	5	1:18.08	+1.98
8	8	Baptiste Sambuis	France	37.38	5	40.74	8	1:18.12	+2.02
9	19	Max Geissler-Hauber	Germany	38.07	10	40.31	6	1:18.38	+2.28
10	10	Louis Latulippe	Canada	38.43	15	40.96	11	1:19.39	+3.29
11	14	Ohra Kimishima	Japan	38.54	17	40.94	10	1:19.48	+3.38
12	12	Roman Zverian	Russia	38.73	18	40.80	9	1:19.53	+3.43
13	37	Eduard Hallberg	Finland	38.48	16	41.15	14	1:19.63	+3.53
14	36	Sandro Zurbrügg	Switzerland	38.40	13	41.43	17	1:19.83	+3.73
15	21	Tiziano Gravier	Argentina	39.20	23	41.43	17	1:20.63	+4.53
16	45	Gian Maria Illariuzzi	Italy	39.24	24	41.66	20	1:20.90	+4.80
17	34	Nicolás Pirozzi	Chile	39.84	28	41.13	13	1:20.97	+4.87
18	43	Bartłomiej Sanetra	Poland	39.65	26	41.34	16	1:20.99	+4.89
19	38	David Kubeš	Czech Republic	39.11	22	42.02	22	1:21.13	+5.03
20	31	Daniel Gillis	United States	39.82	27	41.82	21	1:21.64	+5.54
21	41	Ty Acosta	Andorra	40.16	29	41.55	19	1:21.71	+5.61
22	51	Juan Sánchez	Spain	39.59	25	42.40	23	1:21.99	+5.89
23	46	Taras Filiak	Ukraine	40.66	30	42.66	24	1:23.32	+7.22
24	26	Simen Sellæg	Norway	42.43	37	41.18	15	1:23.61	+7.51
25	16	Thomas Hoffman	Australia	38.22	12	45.44	31	1:23.66	+7.56
26	42	Derin Berkin	Turkey	41.26	32	43.20	25	1:24.46	+8.36
27	56	Joey Steggall	Australia	41.03	31	44.32	27	1:25.35	+9.25
28	50	Tamás Trunk	Hungary	41.93	36	43.69	26	1:25.62	+9.52
29	57	Hans Markus Danilas	Estonia	42.84	39	44.59	28	1:27.43	+11.33
30	58	Andrei Stănescu	Romania	42.49	38	45.71	32	1:28.20	+12.10
30	55	Uglješa Pantelić	Serbia	41.91	35	46.29	33	1:28.20	+12.10
32	64	Mirko Lazareski	North Macedonia	43.01	40	45.20	29	1:28.21	+12.11
33	49	Christos Marmarellis	Greece	43.55	42	45.32	30	1:28.87	+12.77
34	60	Vakaris Jokūbas Lapienis	Lithuania	47.40	46	48.00	34	1:35.40	+19.30
35	68	Alberto Tamagnini	San Marino	47.63	48	49.99	35	1:37.62	+21.52
36	75	Manuel Ramos	Portugal	51.25	49	52.53	36	1:43.78	+27.68
37	69	Teo Žampa	Slovakia	41.64	34	1:05.05	39	1:46.69	+30.59
38	73	Ray Iskandar	Lebanon	53.40	50	55.29	37	1:48.69	+32.59
39	71	Thabo Rateleki	South Africa	54.08	51	1:05.82	40	1:59.90	+43.80
40	77	Natthawut Hiranrat	Thailand	1:09.68	52	1:00.29	38	2:09.97	+53.87
	3	Philip Hoffmann	Austria	37.22	3	Did not finish			
	7	Mackenzie Wood	Canada	39.07	21	Did not finish			
	18	Maxx Parys	United States	47.43	47	Did not finish			
	28	Sindre Myklebust	Norway	38.42	14	Did not finish			
	29	Konstantin Stoilov	Bulgaria	38.19	11	Did not finish			
	30	Bautista Alarcón	Argentina	39.00	20	Did not finish			
	52	Gauti Guðmundsson	Iceland	41.50	33	Did not finish			
	62	Joachim Keghian	Luxembourg	46.40	45	Did not finish			
	65	Alen Bičakčić	Bosnia and Herzegovina	45.15	44	Did not finish			
	76	Ezio Leonetti	Albania	44.23	43	Did not finish			
	32	Robert Holmes	Great Britain	38.96	19	Disqualified			
	63	Vladislav Shlemov	Kazakhstan	43.35	41	Disqualified			
	5	Mikkel Remsøy	Norway	Did not finish					
	6	Jaakko Tapanainen	Finland	Did not finish					
	11	Valentin Lotter	Austria	Did not finish					
	15	Victor Bessière	France	Did not finish					
	20	Lukas Ermeskog	Sweden	Did not finish					
	23	Silvano Gini	Switzerland	Did not finish					
	24	Martin Križaj	Slovenia	Did not finish					
	25	Matthew Ryan	Ireland	Did not finish					
	33	Rok Ažnoh	Slovenia	Did not finish					
	35	Vincent Wieser	Austria	Did not finish					
	39	Jack Cunningham	Great Britain	Did not finish					
	40	Rok Stojanovič	Slovenia	Did not finish					
	44	Louis Masquelier	Belgium	Did not finish					
	47	Kim Si-won	South Korea	Did not finish					
	48	Trent Pennington	United States	Did not finish					
	53	Harrison Messenger	New Zealand	Did not finish					
	54	Kristofers Gulbis	Latvia	Did not finish					
	59	Yi Xiaoyang	China	Did not finish					
	61	Maksim Davydouski	Belarus	Did not finish					
	66	Roham Saba	Iran	Did not finish					
	67	Nodar Kozanashvili	Georgia	Did not finish					
	72	Miguel Chi Hung Almirall	Hong Kong	Did not finish					
	74	Mackenson Florindo	Haiti	Did not finish					
	2	Auguste Aulnette	France	Disqualified					
	70	Drin Kokaj	Kosovo	Disqualified					
