= San Marino at the 2024 Winter Youth Olympics =

- Flag of San Marino
- IOC code: SMR
- NOC: Sammarinese National Olympic Committee

in Gangwon, South Korea 19 January 2024 – 1 February 2024
- Competitors: 1 in 1 sport
- Flag bearer (opening): Mattia Beccari
- Flag bearer (closing): TBD
- Medals: Gold 0 Silver 0 Bronze 0 Total 0

Winter Youth Olympics appearances
- 2012; 2016; 2020; 2024

San Marino competed at the 2024 Winter Youth Olympics in Gangwon, South Korea, from January 19 to February 1, 2024, This was San Marino's fourth appearance at the Winter Youth Olympic Games, having competed at every Games since the inaugural edition in 2012.

The San Marino team consisted of one male alpine skier. Alpine skier Mattia Beccari was the country's flagbearer during the opening ceremony.

== Competitors ==
The following is the list of number of competitors (per gender) participating at the games per sport/discipline.

Sport	Men	Women	Total
Alpine skiing	1	0	1
Total	1	0	1

== Alpine skiing ==
San Marino qualified one male alpine skier.

Men

Athlete	Event	Run 1		Run 2		Total	
Athlete	Event	Time	Rank	Time	Rank	Time	Rank
Mattia Beccari	Giant slalom	DNF					
Mattia Beccari	Slalom	57.52	55	1:06.06	37	2:03.58	37

== See also ==
- San Marino at the 2024 Summer Olympics
