= Ashley Tshanda Ongong'a =

Kenyan cross-country skier (born 2007)

Ashley Tshanda Ongong'a (born 2007) is a Kenyan-Italian cross-country skier. In 2023, she made history after becoming the first African woman to compete in cross-country skiing at the Winter Youth Olympics.

== Biography ==
Ongong'a was born in 2007 in Subiaco, Italy. Her father is Kenyan and her mother is Congolese. Ongong'a began skiing when she was 4 years old, skiing with a local ski group in Monte Livata. At age 6, she began to dream about representing Kenya in the Olympics. Her father, who moved from Kenya to Italy at age 21, encouraged her passion in the sport. At age 14, Ongong'a moved to Tarvisio from her home near Rome to train at Bachmann Sport College, to continue her training.

At age 16 in 2023, she made history as the first Kenyan cross-country skier to qualify for the 2024 Winter Youth Olympics. It was her first year accumulating FIS points. Ongong'a holds both Kenyan and Italian citizenship, and chose to ski for Kenya in the Youth Olympics, despite only visiting the country once.

Prior to the Youth Olympics, Ongonga and Kenyan alpine skier Issa Laborde travelled to South Korea to take part in a training camp before the event. At the Youth Winter Olympics in Gangwon, Ongong'a finished 62nd in the Sprint Freestyle and 63rd in the 7.5 km Classic event.

In 2025, Ongong'a took part in the World Ski Championships, where she finished nine minutes behind the winner, earning 43rd place in the qualifying. Ongong'a would finish the 10 km classic event in 97th place.

At the U23 World Championships in Schilpario, Ongong'a finished 64th in the sprint classic and 71st in the 10 km freestyle.

== See also ==
- Kenya at the 2024 Winter Youth Olympics
- Sabrina Simader, first Kenyan woman to compete at the Winter Olympics
- Philip Boit, first Kenyan to compete at the Olympics
