= Montenegro at the 2024 Winter Youth Olympics =

- Flag of Montenegro
- IOC code: MNE
- NOC: Montenegrin Olympic Committee

in Gangwon, South Korea 19 January 2024 – 1 February 2024
- Competitors: 2 in 1 sport
- Flag bearers (opening): Branislav Pekovic & Anastasija Vukasovic
- Flag bearer (closing): TBD
- Medals: Gold 0 Silver 0 Bronze 0 Total 0

Winter Youth Olympics appearances
- 2012; 2016; 2020; 2024

Montenegro competed at the 2024 Winter Youth Olympics in Gangwon, South Korea, from January 19 to February 1, 2024, This was Montenegro's fourth appearance at the Winter Youth Olympic Games, having competed at every Games since the inaugural edition in 2012.

The Montenegrin team consisted of two alpine skiers (one per gender). Alpine skiers Branislav Pekovic and Anastasija Vukasovic were the country's flagbearers during the opening ceremony.

== Competitors ==
The following is the list of number of competitors (per gender) participating at the games per sport/discipline.

Sport	Men	Women	Total
Alpine skiing	1	1	2
Total	1	1	2

== Alpine skiing ==
Montenegro qualified two alpine skiers (one per gender).

Athlete	Event	Run 1		Run 2		Total	
Athlete	Event	Time	Rank	Time	Rank	Time	Rank
Branislav Peković	Men's super-G	—N/a				DNS	
Branislav Peković	Men's giant slalom	DNF					
Branislav Peković	Men's slalom	53.48	49	1:00.03	35	1:53.51	33
Anastasija Vukasović	Women's giant slalom	1:03.30	50	1:07.54	40	2:10.84	40
Anastasija Vukasović	Women's slalom	DNF					

== See also ==
- Montenegro at the 2024 Summer Olympics
