= North Macedonia at the 2020 Winter Youth Olympics =

- IOC code: MKD
- NOC: Olympic Committee of North Macedonia
- Website: www.mok.org.mk

in Lausanne
- Competitors: 5 in 3 sports
- Flag bearer: Ana Marija Zafirovska
- Medals: Gold 0 Silver 0 Bronze 0 Total 0

Winter Youth Olympics appearances
- 2012; 2016; 2020; 2024

North Macedonia competed at the 2020 Winter Youth Olympics in Lausanne, Switzerland from 9 to 22 January 2020. This was the nation's first participation in an Olympic event under the country's new name.

== Alpine skiing ==
Boys

Athlete	Event	Run 1		Run 2		Total	
Athlete	Event	Time	Rank	Time	Rank	Time	Rank
Mirko Lazareski	Super-G	—				1:03.43	56
Mirko Lazareski	Combined	1:03.43	56	40.58	36	1:44.01	36
Mirko Lazareski	Giant slalom	1:12.73	44	1:11.63	40	2:24.36	41
Mirko Lazareski	Slalom	43.01	40	45.20	29	1:28.21	32

== Biathlon ==
Boys

Athlete	Event	Time	Misses	Rank
Darko Krsteski	Sprint	25:16.8	6 (3+3)	87
Darko Krsteski	Individual	45:29.9	11 (4+2+2+3)	89

Girls

Athlete	Event	Time	Misses	Rank
Ana Marija Zafirovska	Sprint	28:23.8	5 (2+3)	92
Ana Marija Zafirovska	Individual	51:11.9	10 (5+2+3+0)	91

Mixed

Athletes	Event	Time	Misses	Rank
Darko Krsteski; Ana Marija Zafirovska	Single mixed relay	DNF		

== Cross-country skiing ==
Boys

Athlete	Event	Qualification		Quarterfinal		Semifinal		Final	
Athlete	Event	Time	Rank	Time	Rank	Time	Rank	Time	Rank
Andonaki Kostoski	10 km classic	—							
Andonaki Kostoski	Free sprint	4:10.44	77	Did not advance					
Andonaki Kostoski	Cross-country cross	6:16.43	84	—		Did not advance			

Girls

Athlete	Event	Qualification		Quarterfinal		Semifinal		Final	
Athlete	Event	Time	Rank	Time	Rank	Time	Rank	Time	Rank
Mihaela Danoska	5 km classic	—							
Mihaela Danoska	Free sprint	3:47.60	78	Did not advance					
Mihaela Danoska	Cross-country cross	6:59.52	74	—		Did not advance			

== See also ==
- North Macedonia at the 2020 Summer Olympics
