= Iran at the 2020 Winter Youth Olympics =

- IOC code: IRI
- NOC: Iran Olympic Committee
- Website: www.olympic.ir

in Lausanne
- Competitors: 6 in 3 sports
- Medals: Gold 0 Silver 0 Bronze 0 Total 0

Winter Youth Olympics appearances (overview)
- 2012; 2016; 2020; 2024

Iran competed at the 2020 Winter Youth Olympics in Lausanne, Switzerland from 9 to 22 January 2020.

== Alpine skiing ==
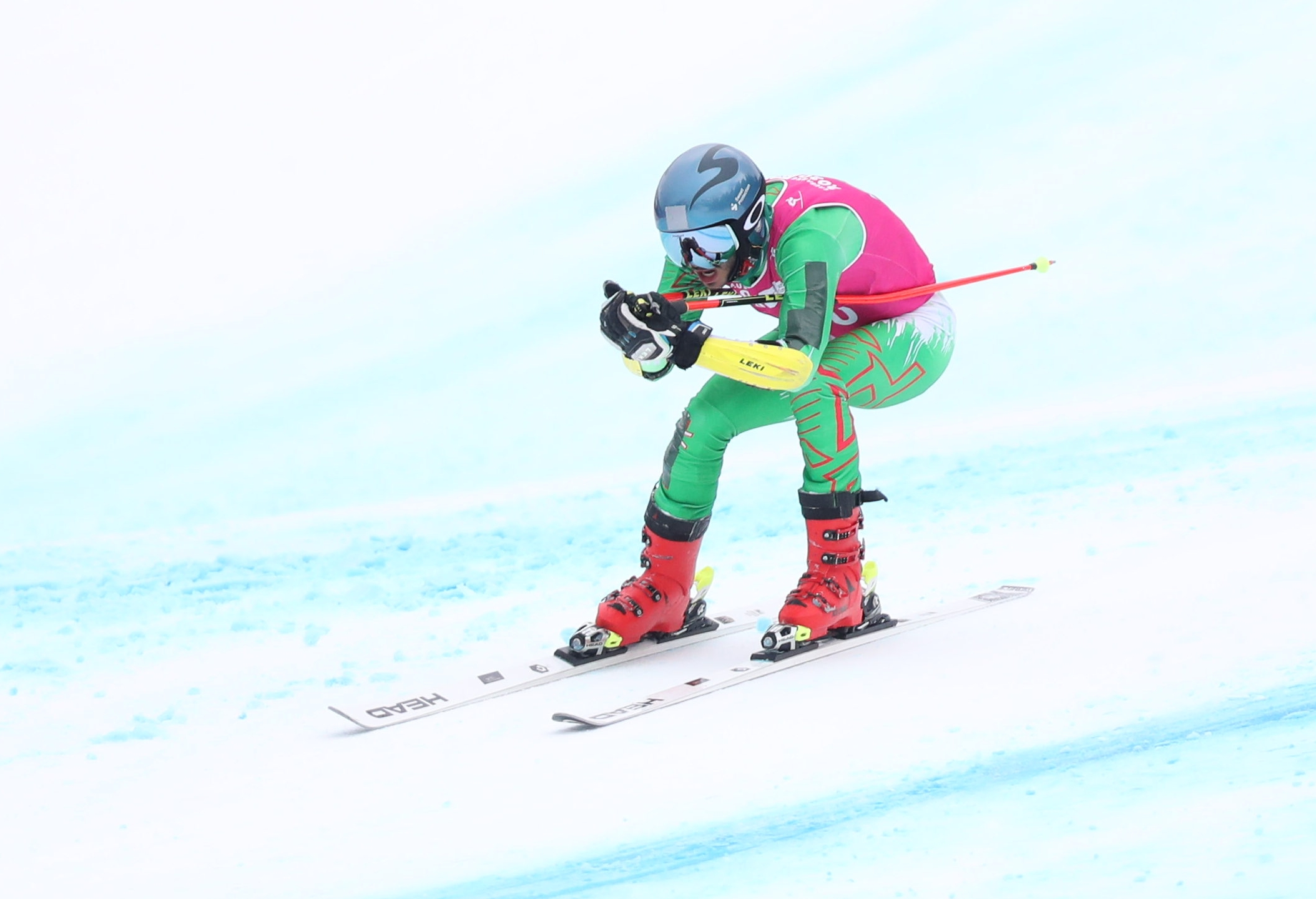
Roham Saba

Boys

Athlete	Event	Run 1		Run 2		Total	
Athlete	Event	Time	Rank	Time	Rank	Time	Rank
Roham Saba	Super-G	—N/a				1:04.45	57
Roham Saba	Combined	1:04.45	57	DNF			
Roham Saba	Giant slalom	1:15.87	52	1:18.06	50	2:33.93	48
Roham Saba	Slalom	DNF					

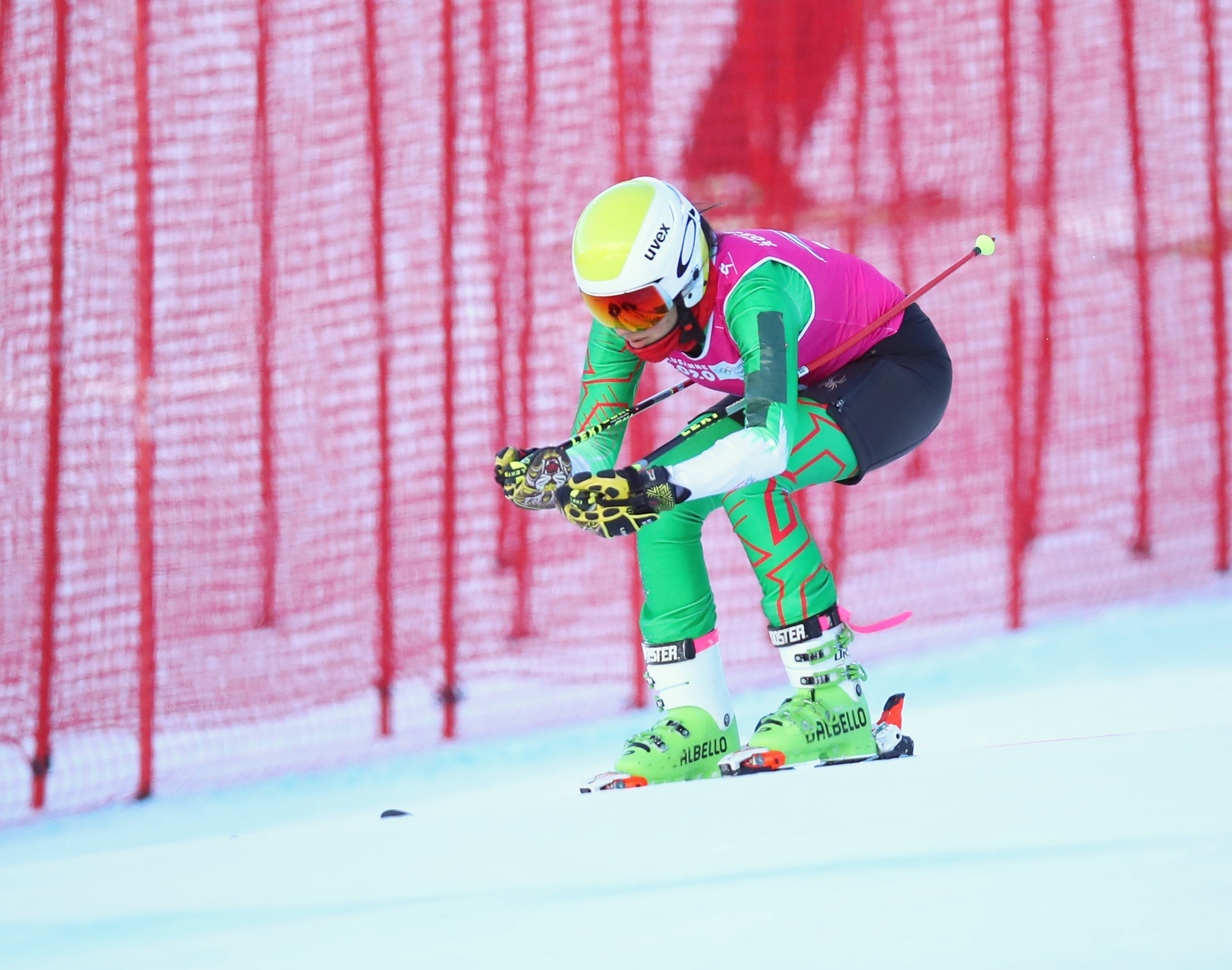
Artemis Hoseyni

Girls

Athlete	Event	Run 1		Run 2		Total	
Athlete	Event	Time	Rank	Time	Rank	Time	Rank
Artemis Hoseyni	Super-G	—N/a				DNS	
Artemis Hoseyni	Combined	DNS					
Artemis Hoseyni	Giant slalom	1:28.60	53	DNF			
Artemis Hoseyni	Slalom	DNF					

== Cross-country skiing ==
Boys

Athlete	Event	Qualification		Quarterfinal		Semifinal		Final	
Athlete	Event	Time	Rank	Time	Rank	Time	Rank	Time	Rank
Amirhossein Bandali	10 km classic	—N/a						40:32.2	77
Amirhossein Bandali	Free sprint	4:38.39	82	Did not advance					
Amirhossein Bandali	Cross-country cross	6:12.81	82	Did not advance					

Girls

Athlete	Event	Qualification		Quarterfinal		Semifinal		Final	
Athlete	Event	Time	Rank	Time	Rank	Time	Rank	Time	Rank
Farnoosh Shemshaki	5 km classic	—N/a						25:39.6	77
Farnoosh Shemshaki	Free sprint	4:15.60	82	Did not advance					
Farnoosh Shemshaki	Cross-country cross	7:45.68	78	Did not advance					

== Ski mountaineering ==
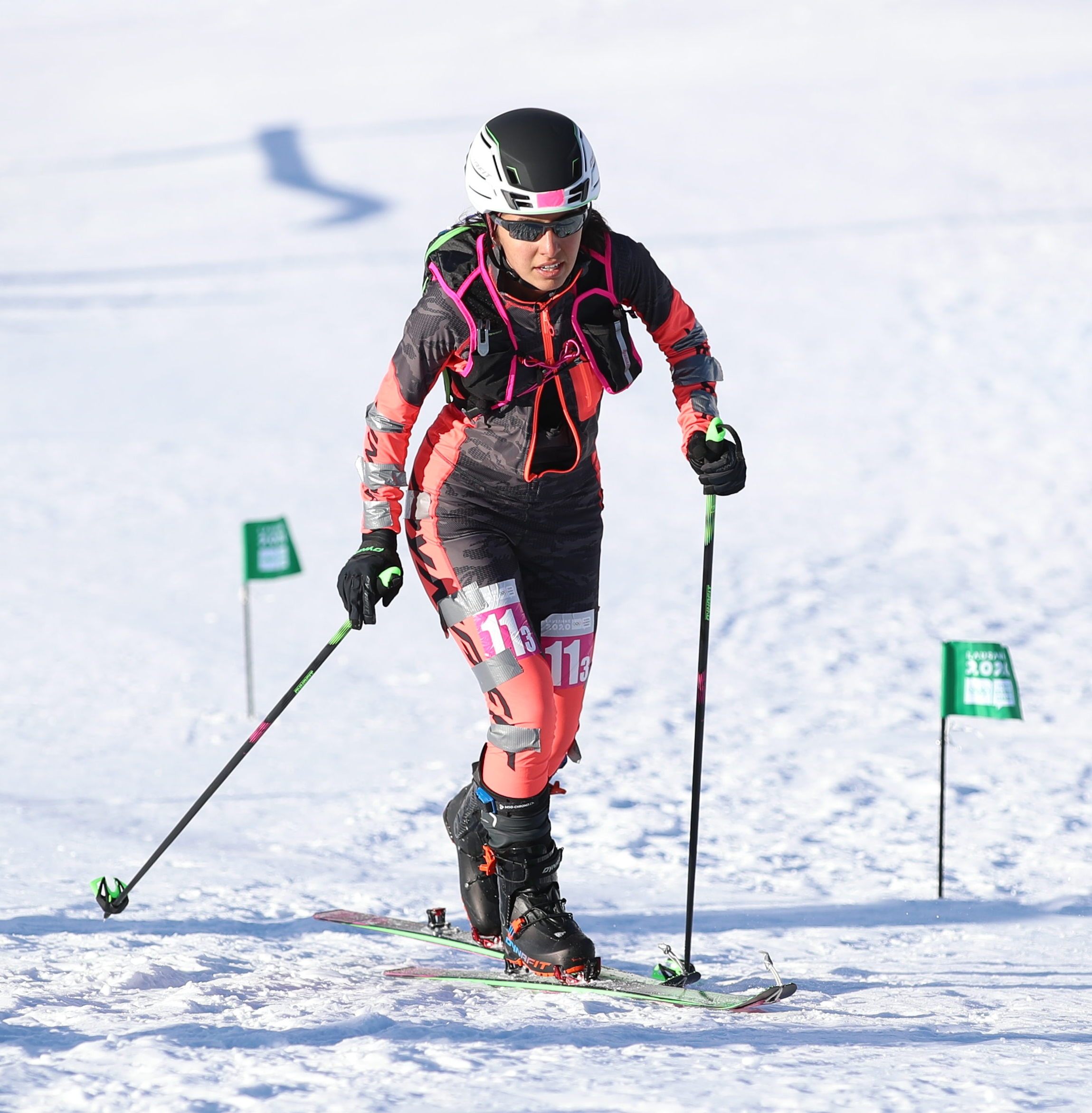
Roksana Saveh Shemshaki

Individual

Athlete	Event	Time	Rank
Ali Kalhor	Boys' individual	1:00:23.88	20
Roksana Saveh Shemshaki	Girls' individual	1:22:25.42	21

Sprint

Athlete	Event	Qualification		Quarterfinal		Semifinal		Final	
Athlete	Event	Time	Rank	Time	Rank	Time	Rank	Time	Rank
Ali Kalhor	Boys' sprint	3:11.57	17	3:02.87	4	Did not advance			
Roksana Saveh Shemshaki	Girls' sprint	4:34.34	22	4:19.13	6	Did not advance			

Mixed

Athlete	Event	Time	Rank
World 1 Ema Chlepkova (CAN); Trym Dalset Lødøen (NOR); Roksana Saveh Shemshaki (IRI); Findlay Eyre (CAN)	Mixed relay	41:44	10

== See also ==
- Iran at the 2020 Summer Olympics
