= Kyrgyzstan at the 2012 Winter Youth Olympics =

- IOC code: KGZ
- NOC: Kyrgyzstan Olympic Committee
- Website: www.olympic.kg

in Innsbruck
- Competitors: 1 in 1 sport
- Flag bearer: Zafar Shakhmuratov
- Medals: Gold 0 Silver 0 Bronze 0 Total 0

Winter Youth Olympics appearances (overview)
- 2012; 2016; 2020; 2024

Kyrgyzstan competed at the 2012 Winter Youth Olympics in Innsbruck, Austria. The Kyrgyzstani team was made up of one male athlete, a cross country skier.

== Cross country skiing ==
Kyrgyzstan qualified one boy in cross-country skiing.

Boy

Athlete	Event	Final	
Athlete	Event	Time	Rank
Zafar Shakhmuratov	10km classical	39:07.1	46

Sprint

Athlete	Event	Qualification		Quarterfinal		Semifinal		Final	
Athlete	Event	Total	Rank	Total	Rank	Total	Rank	Total	Rank
Zafar Shakhmuratov	Boys' sprint	2:01.09	43	did not advance					

== See also ==
- Kyrgyzstan at the 2012 Summer Olympics
