= Armenia at the 2016 Winter Youth Olympics =

- IOC code: ARM
- NOC: Armenian Olympic Committee
- Website: www.armnoc.am

in Lillehammer
- Competitors: 2 in 2 sports
- Medals: Gold 0 Silver 0 Bronze 0 Total 0

Winter Youth Olympics appearances (overview)
- 2012; 2016; 2020; 2024

Armenia competed at the 2016 Winter Youth Olympics in Lillehammer, Norway from 12 to 21 February 2016.

== Cross-country skiing ==
Boys

Athlete	Event	Qualification		Quarterfinal		Semifinal		Final	
Athlete	Event	Time	Rank	Time	Rank	Time	Rank	Time	Rank
Mikayel Mikayelyan	10 km freestyle	—						26:12.1	26
Mikayel Mikayelyan	Classical sprint	3:16.38	35	did not advance					
Mikayel Mikayelyan	Cross-country cross	3:18.48	27 Q	—		3:14.65	9	did not advance	

== Figure skating ==
Singles

Athlete	Event	SP		FS		Total	
Athlete	Event	Points	Rank	Points	Rank	Points	Rank
Anastasia Galustyan	Girls' singles	55.89	7	77.32	11	133.21	10

== See also ==
- Armenia at the 2016 Summer Olympics
