= San Marino at the 2012 Winter Youth Olympics =

- IOC code: SMR
- NOC: San Marino National Olympic Committee
- Website: www.cons.sm

in Innsbruck
- Competitors: 1 in 1 sport
- Flag bearer: Vincenzo Michelotti
- Medals: Gold 0 Silver 0 Bronze 0 Total 0

Winter Youth Olympics appearances
- 2012; 2016; 2020; 2024

San Marino competed at the 2012 Winter Youth Olympics in Innsbruck, Austria. The San Marino team was made up of one athlete, an alpine skier, and two officials. Alberto Zampagna served as the chef de mission.

== Alpine skiing ==
San Marino qualified one boy for alpine skiing.

Boy

Athlete	Event	Run 1	Run 2	Total	Rank
Vincenzo Michelotti	Boys' slalom	48.67	DNF		
Vincenzo Michelotti	Boys' giant slalom	1:11.34	1:01.44	2:12.78	36

== See also ==
- San Marino at the 2012 Summer Olympics
