= Monaco at the 2024 Winter Youth Olympics =

- Flag of Monaco
- IOC code: MON
- NOC: Monégasque Olympic Committee

in Gangwon, South Korea 19 January 2024 – 1 February 2024
- Competitors: 1 in 1 sport
- Flag bearer (opening): Hugo Leonelli
- Flag bearer (closing): TBD
- Medals: Gold 0 Silver 0 Bronze 0 Total 0

Winter Youth Olympics appearances
- 2012; 2016; 2020; 2024

Monaco is competed at the 2024 Winter Youth Olympics in Gangwon, South Korea, from January 19 to February 1, 2024, This was Monaco's third appearance at the Winter Youth Olympic Games, having last competed in 2016.

Monaco's team consisted of one male alpine skier and one female figure skater. Alpine skier Hugo Leonelli. was the country's flagbearer during the opening ceremony.

== Competitors ==
The following is the list of number of competitors (per gender) participating at the games per sport/discipline.

Sport	Men	Women	Total
Alpine skiing	1	0	1
Figure Skating	0	1	1
Total	1	1	2

== Alpine skiing ==
Monaco qualified one male alpine skier.

Men

Athlete	Event	Run 1		Run 2		Total	
Athlete	Event	Time	Rank	Time	Rank	Time	Rank
Hugo Leonelli	Super-G	—				58.79	42
Hugo Leonelli	Giant slalom	53.52	45	49.00	35	1:42.52	35
Hugo Leonelli	Slalom	52.56	45	57.51	26	1:50.07	28
Hugo Leonelli	Combined	57.84	38	1:01.67	30	1:59.51	29

== See also ==
- Monaco at the 2024 Summer Olympics
