= Macedonia at the 2012 Winter Youth Olympics =

- IOC code: MKD
- NOC: Macedonian Olympic Committee
- Website: www.mok.org.mk

in Innsbruck
- Competitors: 2 in 2 sports
- Flag bearer: Marijan Nasoku
- Medals: Gold 0 Silver 0 Bronze 0 Total 0

Winter Youth Olympics appearances
- 2012; 2016; 2020; 2024

Macedonia competed at the 2012 Winter Youth Olympics in Innsbruck, Austria. The Macedonian team was made up of two athletes in two sports.

== Alpine skiing ==
Macedonia qualified one boy in alpine skiing.

Boy

Athlete	Event	Final			
Athlete	Event	Run 1	Run 2	Total	Rank
Marijan Nasoku	Slalom	45.99	DNF		
Marijan Nasoku	Giant slalom	1:03.84	1:01.46	2:05.30	31
Marijan Nasoku	Super-G			DSQ	

== Cross country skiing ==
Macedonia qualified one boy.

Boy
Sprint

Athlete	Event	Qualification		Quarterfinal		Semifinal		Final	
Athlete	Event	Total	Rank	Total	Rank	Total	Rank	Total	Rank
Velko Lozanoski	Boys' sprint	2:35.39	50	did not advance					

== See also ==
- Macedonia at the 2012 Summer Olympics
