= Nepal at the 2012 Winter Youth Olympics =

- IOC code: NEP
- NOC: Nepal Olympic Committee

in Innsbruck
- Competitors: 1 in 1 sport
- Flag bearer: Bibash Lama
- Medals: Gold 0 Silver 0 Bronze 0 Total 0

Winter Youth Olympics appearances
- 2012; 2016; 2020; 2024

Nepal competed at the 2012 Winter Youth Olympics in Innsbruck, Austria. The sole Nepali athlete was an alpine skier.

== Alpine skiing ==
Nepal qualified one boy in alpine skiing.

Boy

Athlete	Event	Final			
Athlete	Event	Run 1	Run 2	Total	Rank
Bibash Lama	Slalom	DNF			
Bibash Lama	Giant slalom	1:42.29	1:31.39	3:13.68	39

== See also ==
- Nepal at the 2012 Summer Olympics
