= Kenya at the 2024 Winter Youth Olympics =

- Flag of Kenya
- IOC code: KEN
- NOC: Kenyan Olympic Committee

in Gangwon, South Korea 19 January 2024 – 1 February 2024
- Competitors: 2 in 2 sports
- Flag bearer (opening): Issa Laborde & Ashley Ongonga
- Flag bearer (closing): TBD
- Medals: Gold 0 Silver 0 Bronze 0 Total 0

Winter Youth Olympics appearances
- 2012; 2016; 2020–2024

Kenya competed at the 2024 Winter Youth Olympics in Gangwon, South Korea, from January 19 to February 1, 2024. This was Kenya's second appearance at the Winter Youth Olympic Games, having debuted at the Games at the second edition in 2016.

The Kenyan team consisted of two athletes (one man and one woman) competing in two sports. Alpine skier Issa Laborde and cross-country skier Ashley Ongonga were the country's flagbearers during the opening ceremony.

== Competitors ==
The following is the list of number of competitors (per gender) participating at the games per sport/discipline.

Sport	Men	Women	Total
Alpine skiing	1	0	1
Cross-country skiing	0	1	1
Total	1	1	2

== Alpine skiing ==
Kenya qualified one male alpine skier. French-born skier Issa Gachingiri Laborde Dit Pere chose to represent his mother's country of Kenya in international competition.

Men

Athlete	Event	Run 1		Run 2		Total	
Athlete	Event	Time	Rank	Time	Rank	Time	Rank
Issa Laborde	Super-G	—				58.35	41
Issa Laborde	Giant slalom	54.12	48	50.09	37	1:44.21	37
Issa Laborde	Slalom	56.18	53	59.85	34	1:56.03	35
Issa Laborde	Combined	59.23	46	1:06.56	35	2:05.79	35

== Cross-country skiing ==
Kenya qualified one female cross-country skier. Italian based skier Ashley Tshanda Ongonga has dual citizenship with Italy and Kenya and chose to represent the latter. Ongonga became the first female cross-country skier from the continent of Africa to qualify for the Winter Youth Olympics.

Athlete	Event	Qualification		Quarterfinal		Semifinal		Final	
Athlete	Event	Time	Rank	Time	Rank	Time	Rank	Time	Rank
Ashley Ongonga	7.5 km classical	—						30:26.1	63
Ashley Ongonga	Sprint freestyle	4:22.80	62	Did not advance					

== See also ==
- Kenya at the 2024 Summer Olympics
