= San Marino at the 2016 Winter Youth Olympics =

- IOC code: SMR
- NOC: San Marino National Olympic Committee
- Website: www.cons.sm

in Lillehammer
- Competitors: 1 in 1 sport
- Medals: Gold 0 Silver 0 Bronze 0 Total 0

Winter Youth Olympics appearances
- 2012; 2016; 2020; 2024

San Marino competed at the 2016 Winter Youth Olympics in Lillehammer, Norway from 12 to 21 February 2016.

== Alpine skiing ==
Boys

Athlete	Event	Run 1		Run 2		Total	
Athlete	Event	Time	Rank	Time	Rank	Time	Rank
Alessandro Mariotti	Slalom	58.23	40	56.84	31	1:55.07	32
Alessandro Mariotti	Giant slalom	1:27.03	38	1:25.81	30	2:52.84	30

== See also ==
- San Marino at the 2016 Summer Olympics
