= India at the 2024 Winter Youth Olympics =

- Flag of India
- IOC code: IND
- NOC: Indian Olympic Committee

in Gangwon, South Korea 19 January 2024 – 1 February 2024
- Competitors: 1 in 1 sport
- Flag bearer (opening): Sahil Thakur
- Flag bearer (closing): Snigdha Raju Kucharlapati
- Medals: Gold 0 Silver 0 Bronze 0 Total 0

Winter Youth Olympics appearances (overview)
- 2012; 2016; 2020; 2024

India competed at the 2024 Winter Youth Olympics in Gangwon, South Korea, from January 19 to February 1, 2024. This was India's third appearance at the Winter Youth Olympic Games, having made its last appearance in 2016.

The Indian team consisted of one male alpine skier. Alpine skier Sahil Thakur was the country's flagbearer during the opening ceremony.

== Competitors ==
The following is the list of number of competitors (per gender) participating at the games per sport/discipline.

Sport	Men	Women	Total
Alpine skiing	1	0	1
Total	1	0	1

== Alpine skiing ==
India qualified one male alpine skier.

Athlete	Event	Run 1		Run 2		Total	
Athlete	Event	Time	Rank	Time	Rank	Time	Rank
Sahil Thakur	Giant slalom	1:04.67	62	57.85	47	2:02.52	47
Sahil Thakur	Slalom	1:07.14	61	DNF			

== See also ==
- India at the 2024 Summer Olympics
