= San Marino at the 2020 Winter Youth Olympics =

- IOC code: SMR
- NOC: Sammarinese National Olympic Committee
- Website: www.cons.sm

in Lausanne
- Competitors: 1 in 1 sport
- Flag bearer: Alberto Tamagnini
- Medals: Gold 0 Silver 0 Bronze 0 Total 0

Winter Youth Olympics appearances
- 2012; 2016; 2020; 2024

San Marino competed at the 2020 Winter Youth Olympics in Lausanne, Switzerland from 9 to 22 January 2020.

== Alpine skiing ==
Boys

Athlete	Event	Run 1		Run 2		Total	
Athlete	Event	Time	Rank	Time	Rank	Time	Rank
Alberto Tamagnini	Giant slalom	1:14.05	49	1:14.86	46	2:28.91	45
Alberto Tamagnini	Slalom	47.63	48	49.99	35	1:37.62	35

== See also ==
- San Marino at the 2020 Summer Olympics
