= Greece at the 2024 Winter Youth Olympics =

- Flag of Greece
- IOC code: GRE
- NOC: Hellenic Olympic Committee

in Gangwon, South Korea 19 January 2024 – 1 February 2024
- Competitors: 14 in 5 sports
- Flag bearers (opening): Apostolos Vougioukas & Maria Tsiakra
- Flag bearer (closing): TBD
- Medals: Gold 0 Silver 0 Bronze 0 Total 0

Winter Youth Olympics appearances
- 2012; 2016; 2020; 2024

Greece is scheduled to compete at the 2024 Winter Youth Olympics in Gangwon, South Korea, from January 19 to February 1, 2024. This will be Greece's fourth appearance at the Winter Youth Olympic Games, having competed at every Games since the inaugural edition in 2012.

The Greek team consisted of 14 athletes (six men and eight women) competing in 5 sports. Alpine skier Apostolos Vougioukas and biathlete Maria Tsiakra were the country's flagbearers during the opening ceremony.

== Competitors ==
The following is the list of number of competitors (per gender) participating at the games per sport/discipline.

Sport	Men	Women	Total
Alpine skiing	1	1	2
Biathlon	3	3	6
Cross-country skiing	2	2	4
Freestyle skiing	0	1	1
Snowboarding	0	1	1
Total	6	8	14

== Alpine skiing ==
Greece qualified two alpine skiers (one per gender).

Men

Athlete	Event	Run 1		Run 2		Total	
Athlete	Event	Time	Rank	Time	Rank	Time	Rank
Apostolos Vougioukas	Super-G	—N/a				57.430	38
Apostolos Vougioukas	Giant slalom	52.88	41	49.23	36	1:42.11	33
Apostolos Vougioukas	Slalom	52.29	43	58.23	29	1:50.52	29
Apostolos Vougioukas	Combined	56.78	32	1:00.20	27	1:56.98	27

Women

Athlete	Event	Run 1		Run 2		Total	
Athlete	Event	Time	Rank	Time	Rank	Time	Rank
Theopisti Georgiadou	Giant slalom	1:00.59	45	Did not finish			
Theopisti Georgiadou	Slalom	1:05.96	55	1:01.89	40	2:07.85	40

== Biathlon ==
Greece qualified six biathletes (three per gender).

Men

Athlete	Event	Time	Misses	Rank
Ioannis Anastasiadis	Sprint	28:20.9	3 (1+2)	86
Ioannis Anastasiadis	Individual	55:34.9	9 (2+3+1+3)	85
Antonios Prodromidis	Sprint	30:33.5	5 (3+2)	93
Antonios Prodromidis	Individual	1:07:43.2	14 (4+3+3+4)	97
Vasileios Rosenlis	Sprint	27:51.2	7 (4+3)	85
Vasileios Rosenlis	Individual	55.43.9	9 (1+3+4+1)	86

Women

Athlete	Event	Time	Misses	Rank
Maria Tsiarka	Sprint	27:17.2	6 (1+5)	73
Maria Tsiarka	Individual	55:12.1	13 (3+3+4+3)	89
Lydia Tsiatsiou	Sprint	32:37.8	6 (3+3)	85
Lydia Tsiatsiou	Individual	56:44.1	10 (1+4+3+2)	92
Aikaterini Vaikou	Sprint	29:23.6	7 (4+3)	84
Aikaterini Vaikou	Individual	50:15.4	6 (1+2+2+1)	83

Mixed

Athletes	Event	Time	Misses	Rank
Aikaterini Vaikou; Vasileios Rosenlis	Single mixed relay	Lapped		30
Maria Tsiarka; Lydia Tsiatsiou; Ioannis Anastasiadis; Antonios Prodromidis	Mixed relay	Lapped		22

== Cross-country skiing ==
Greece qualified four cross-country skiers (two per gender).

Men

Athlete	Event	Qualification		Quarterfinal		Semifinal		Final	
Athlete	Event	Time	Rank	Time	Rank	Time	Rank	Time	Rank
Evangelos Athanasiou	7.5 km classical	—N/a						30:57.7	77
Evangelos Athanasiou	Sprint freestyle	3:45.68	71	Did not advance					
Ioannis Georgakis	7.5 km classical	—N/a						28:44.0	75
Ioannis Georgakis	Sprint freestyle	3:46.17	72	Did not advance					

Women

Athlete	Event	Qualification		Quarterfinal		Semifinal		Final	
Athlete	Event	Time	Rank	Time	Rank	Time	Rank	Time	Rank
Christina Roza	7.5 km classical	—N/a						32:29.6	66
Christina Roza	Sprint freestyle	4:11.54	52	Did not advance					
Georgia Tsiarka	7.5 km classical	—N/a						Disqualified	
Georgia Tsiarka	Sprint freestyle	4:22.69	61	Did not advance					

Mixed

Athlete	Event	Time	Rank
Christina Roza; Ioannis Georgakis; Georgia Tsiarka; Evangelos Athanasiou	Mixed relay	1:08:50.6	22

== Freestyle skiing ==
Greece qualified one female freestyle skier.

Slopestyle/Big Air

Athlete	Event	Qualification				Final				
Athlete	Event	Run 1	Run 2	Best	Rank	Run 1	Run 2	Run 3	Best	Rank
Olga Stafylidou	Women's slopestyle	1.00	DNS	1.00	19	Did not advance				

== Snowboarding ==
Greece qualified one female snowboarder.

Slopestyle/Big Air
Women

- Margarita Zografou

== See also ==
- Greece at the 2024 Summer Olympics
