= Kyrgyzstan at the 2020 Winter Youth Olympics =

- IOC code: KGZ
- NOC: National Olympic Committee of the Kyrgyz Republic
- Website: www.olympic.cn (in Chinese and English)

in Lausanne
- Competitors: 2 in 2 sports
- Medals: Gold 0 Silver 0 Bronze 0 Total 0

Winter Youth Olympics appearances (overview)
- 2012; 2016; 2020; 2024

Kyrgyzstan competed at the 2020 Winter Youth Olympics in Lausanne, Switzerland from 9 to 22 January 2020.

== Biathlon ==
Girls

Athlete	Event	Time	Misses	Rank
Elena Bondarets	Sprint	26:00.4	6 (4+2)	88
Elena Bondarets	Individual	DSQ		

== Cross-country skiing ==
Boys

Athlete	Event	Qualification		Quarterfinal		Semifinal		Final	
Athlete	Event	Time	Rank	Time	Rank	Time	Rank	Time	Rank
Islam Turganbaev	10 km classic	—						42:00.1	78
Islam Turganbaev	Free sprint	4:46.69	85	Did not advance					
Islam Turganbaev	Cross-country cross	6:03.30	81	Did not advance					

Girls

Athlete	Event	Qualification		Quarterfinal		Semifinal		Final	
Athlete	Event	Time	Rank	Time	Rank	Time	Rank	Time	Rank
Elena Bondarets	5 km classic	—						24:40.4	76
Elena Bondarets	Free sprint	3:43.37	77	Did not advance					

== See also ==
- Kyrgyzstan at the 2020 Summer Olympics
