= Lebanon at the 2024 Winter Youth Olympics =

- Flag of Lebanon
- IOC code: LBN
- NOC: Lebanese Olympic Committee

in Gangwon, South Korea 19 January 2024 – 1 February 2024
- Competitors: 5 in 2 sports
- Flag bearers (opening): Alexandre El Hayek & Syrelle Lozom
- Flag bearer (closing): TBD
- Medals: Gold 0 Silver 0 Bronze 0 Total 0

Winter Youth Olympics appearances
- 2012; 2016; 2020; 2024

Lebanon is scheduled to compete at the 2024 Winter Youth Olympics in Gangwon, South Korea, from 19 January to 1 February 2024, This will be Lebanon's fourth appearance at the Winter Youth Olympic Games, having competed at every Games since the inaugural edition in 2012.

The Lebanese delegation comprises five athletes (two men and three women) competing in two sports. Alpine skier Alexandre El Hayek and cross-country skier Syrelle Lozom were the country's flagbearers during the opening ceremony.

== Competitors ==
The following is the list of number of competitors (per gender) participating at the games per sport/discipline.

Sport	Men	Women	Total
Alpine skiing	1	1	2
Cross-country skiing	1	2	3
Total	2	3	5

== Alpine skiing ==
Lebanon qualified two alpine skiers (one per gender).

Athlete	Event	Run 1		Run 2		Total	
Athlete	Event	Time	Rank	Time	Rank	Time	Rank
Alexandre El Hayek	Men's super-G	—N/a				DNS	
Alexandre El Hayek	Men's giant slalom	1:00.16	57	53.83	41	1:53.99	42
Alexandre El Hayek	Men's slalom	DNF					
Kiana Sakkal	Women's super-G	—N/a				DNS	
Kiana Sakkal	Women's giant slalom	1:00.69	46	1:04.58	37	2:05.27	37
Kiana Sakkal	Women's slalom	1:07.14	57	DNF			

== Cross-country skiing ==
Lebanon qualified three cross-country skiers (one man and two women).

Athlete	Event	Qualification		Quarterfinal		Semifinal		Final	
Athlete	Event	Time	Rank	Time	Rank	Time	Rank	Time	Rank
Marcelino Tawk	7.5 km classical	—N/a						26:33.6	72
Marcelino Tawk	Sprint freestyle	4:22.40	80	Did not advance					
Syrelle Lozom	7.5 km classical	—N/a						33:46.1	67
Syrelle Lozom	Sprint freestyle	5:15.32	77	Did not advance					
Karen Succar	7.5 km classical	—N/a						39:14.7	74
Karen Succar	Sprint freestyle	5:33.30	78	Did not advance					

== See also ==
- Lebanon at the 2024 Summer Olympics
