= Algeria at the 2024 Winter Youth Olympics =

- Flag of Algeria
- IOC code: ALG
- NOC: Algerian Olympic Committee

in Gangwon, South Korea 19 January 2024 – 1 February 2024
- Competitors: 1 in 1 sport
- Flag bearer (opening): Abderrahmane Bouderbala
- Flag bearer (closing): Abderrahmane Bouderbala
- Medals: Gold 0 Silver 0 Bronze 0 Total 0

Winter Youth Olympics appearances (overview)
- 2024

Algeria competed at the 2024 Winter Youth Olympics in Gangwon, South Korea, from January 19 to February 1, 2024. This was Algeria's debut appearance at the Winter Youth Olympic Games.

Algeria's team consisted of one male alpine skier. Alpine skier Abderrahmane Bouderbala was the country's flagbearer during the opening ceremony.

== Competitors ==
The following is the list of number of competitors participating at the Games per sport/discipline.

| Sport | Boys | Girls | Total |
|---|---|---|---|
| Alpine skiing | 1 | 0 | 1 |
| Total | 1 | 0 | 1 |

== Alpine skiing ==
Algeria received one male quota.

Men

| Athlete | Event | Run 1 | | Run 2 | | Total | |
| Athlete | Event | Time | Rank | Time | Rank | Time | Rank |
|---|---|---|---|---|---|---|---|
| Abderrahmane Bouderbala | Giant slalom | 1:09.47 | 64 | 1:02.79 | 49 | 2:12.26 | 49 |
| Abderrahmane Bouderbala | Slalom | DNS | | | | | |

== See also ==
- Algeria at the 2024 Summer Olympics
