= Armenia at the 2020 Winter Youth Olympics =

- IOC code: ARM
- NOC: Armenian Olympic Committee
- Website: www.armnoc.am

in Lausanne
- Competitors: 1 in 1 sport
- Flag bearer: Spartak Voskanyan
- Medals: Gold 0 Silver 0 Bronze 0 Total 0

Winter Youth Olympics appearances (overview)
- 2012; 2016; 2020; 2024

Armenia competed at the 2020 Winter Youth Olympics in Lausanne, Switzerland from 9 to 22 January 2020.

== Cross-country skiing ==
Boys

Athlete	Event	Qualification		Quarterfinal		Semifinal		Final	
Athlete	Event	Time	Rank	Time	Rank	Time	Rank	Time	Rank
Spartak Voskanyan	10 km classic	—						33:26.50	68
Spartak Voskanyan	Sprint freestyle	4:14.23	78	did not advance					

== See also ==
- Armenia at the 2020 Summer Olympics
