= Kyrgyzstan at the Youth Olympics =

Performance of Kyrgyzstan at the Youth Olympic Games

- IOC code: KGZ
- NOC: Kyrgyzstan Olympic Committee
- Website: www.olympic.kg
- Medals Ranked 79th: Gold 1 Silver 3 Bronze 4 Total 8

Summer appearances
- 2010; 2014; 2018; 2026

Winter appearances
- 2012; 2016; 2020; 2024

Kyrgyzstan has participated at the Youth Olympic Games since the inaugural 2010 Games and every edition after that.

== Medal tables ==
=== Medals by Summer Games ===
Games	Athletes	Gold	Silver	Bronze	Total	Rank
2010 Singapore	8	1	0	2	3	47
(China) 2014 Nanjing	7	0	1	0	1	70
(Argentina) 2018 Buenos Aires	13	0	2	1	3	67
(Senegal) 2026 Dakar	5	0	0	1	1	88
Total		1	3	4	8	77

=== Medals by Winter Games ===
Games	Athletes	Gold	Silver	Bronze	Total	Rank
(Austria) 2012 Innsbruck	1	0	0	0	0	-
(Norway) 2016 Lillehammer	1	0	0	0	0	-
(Switzerland) 2020 Lausanne	2	0	0	0	0	-
(South Korea) 2024 Gangwon						
Total		0	0	0	0	-

=== Medals by summer sport ===
Sport	Gold	Silver	Bronze	Total
Wrestling	1	1	1	3
Judo	0	1	1	2
Swimming	0	1	0	1
Fencing	0	0	1	1
Totals (4 entries)	1	3	3	7

== List of medalists ==
=== Summer Games ===
Medal	Name	Games	Sport	Event
Gold	Urmatbek Amatov	2010 Singapore	Wrestling	Boys' Greco-Roman 58 kg
Bronze	Shadybek Sulaimanov	2010 Singapore	Wrestling	Boys' Greco-Roman 50 kg
Bronze	Bolot Toktogonov	2010 Singapore	Judo	Boys' 100 kg
Silver	Rostsilav Dashkov	(China) 2014 Nanjing	Judo	Boys' 100 kg
Silver	Denis Petrashov	(Argentina) 2018 Buenos Aires	Swimming	Boys' 100 m breaststroke
Silver	Elmirbek Sadyrov	(Argentina) 2018 Buenos Aires	Wrestling	Boys' Greco-Roman 60 kg
Bronze	Khasan Baudunov	(Argentina) 2018 Buenos Aires	Fencing	Boys' épée

=== Summer Games medalists as part of Mixed-NOCs Team ===
Medal	Name	Games	Sport	Event
Silver	Khasan Baudunov	(Argentina) 2018 Buenos Aires	Fencing	Mixed team
Bronze	Sultan Zhenishbekov	(Argentina) 2018 Buenos Aires	Judo	Mixed team

== Flag bearers ==
#	Games	Season	Flag bearer	Sport
6	2020 Lausanne	Winter	Elena Bondarets	Biathlon and Cross country skiing
5	2018 Buenos Aires	Summer	Nurbek Aidanbek Uulu	Basketball
4	2016 Lillehammer	Winter	Kunduz Abdykadyrova	Biathlon
3	2014 Nanjing	Summer	Kursant Tolonov	Weightlifting
2	2012 Innsbruck	Winter	Zafar Shakhmuratov	Cross country skiing
1	2010 Singapore	Summer	Bolot Toktogonov	Judo

== See also ==
- Kyrgyzstan at the Olympics
- Kyrgyzstan at the Paralympics
