= Jamaica at the 2024 Winter Youth Olympics =

- Flag of Jamaica
- IOC code: JAM
- NOC: Jamaica Olympic Association

in Gangwon, South Korea 19 January 2024 – 1 February 2024
- Competitors: 3 in 2 sports
- Flag bearer (opening): Henri Rivers IV & Adanna Johnson
- Flag bearer (closing): TBD
- Medals: Gold 0 Silver 0 Bronze 0 Total 0

Winter Youth Olympics appearances
- 2012; 2016; 2020; 2024

Jamaica competed at the 2024 Winter Youth Olympics in Gangwon, South Korea, from January 19 to February 1, 2024, This was Jamaica's second appearance at the Winter Youth Olympic Games, having last competed in 2016.

The Jamaican team consisted of three athletes (one man and two women) competing in two sports. Alpine skier Henri Rivers IV and bobsledder Adanna Johnson were the country's flagbearers during the opening ceremony.

== Competitors ==
The following is the list of number of competitors (per gender) participating at the games per sport/discipline.

Sport	Men	Women	Total
Alpine skiing	1	1	2
Bobsleigh	0	1	1
Total	1	2	3

== Alpine skiing ==
Jamaica qualified two alpine skiers (one per gender).

Athlete	Event	Run 1		Run 2		Total	
Athlete	Event	Time	Rank	Time	Rank	Time	Rank
Henri Rivers IV	Men's super-G	—				DNS	
Henri Rivers IV	Men's giant slalom	DNF					
Henri Rivers IV	Men's slalom	54.96	52	59.37	32	1:54.33	34
Henri Rivers IV	Men's combined	DNS					
Henniyah Rivers	Women's giant slalom	1:01.86	48	1:07.02	39	2:08.88	39
Henniyah Rivers	Women's slalom	DNF					

== Bobsleigh ==
Jamaica qualified one female bobsledder. Adanna Johnson finished the competition in 11th place (out of 12 competitors).

Athlete	Event	Run 1		Run 2		Total	
Athlete	Event	Time	Rank	Time	Rank	Time	Rank
Adanna Johnson	Women's monobob	58.12	11	58.17	10	1:56.29	11

== See also ==
- Jamaica at the 2024 Summer Olympics
