= Cross-country skiing at the 2024 Winter Youth Olympics – Men's sprint =

Men's sprint at the IV Winter Youth Olympic Games
- Venue: Alpensia Biathlon Centre
- Date: 28 January
- Competitors: 80 from 46 nations

Medalists
1st place, gold medalist(s)		Federico Pozzi	Italy
2nd place, silver medalist(s)		Jakob Moch	Germany
3rd place, bronze medalist(s)		Tabor Greenberg	United States

The boys' sprint freestyle cross-country skiing competition at the 2024 Winter Youth Olympics was held on 28 January at the Alpensia Biathlon Centre.

== Results ==
=== Qualifying ===
The qualifying was held at 11:05.

Rank	Bib	Athlete	Country	Time	Deficit	Note
1	41	Elias Eischer	Austria	3:03.98		Q
2	4	Federico Pozzi	Italy	3:04.43	+0.45	Q
3	6	Tage Börjesson	Sweden	3:04.80	+0.82	Q
4	5	Jakob Moch	Germany	3:05.23	+1.25	Q
5	16	Kalle Tossavainen	Finland	3:06.12	+2.14	Q
6	7	Benjamin Barbier	United States	3:06.34	+2.36	Q
7	22	Quentin Lespine	France	3:06.39	+2.41	Q
8	2	Måns Ravald	Sweden	3:06.52	+2.54	Q
9	14	Eamon Wilson	Canada	3:06.56	+2.58	Q
10	15	Leevi Passila	Finland	3:08.39	+4.41	Q
11	13	Maximilian Wanger	Switzerland	3:08.57	+4.59	Q
12	11	Milan Neukirchner	Germany	3:08.59	+4.61	Q
13	12	Tabor Greenberg	United States	3:08.64	+4.66	Q
14	9	Peio Anarbe	Spain	3:08.70	+4.72	Q
15	18	Marco Pinzani	Italy	3:08.93	+4.95	Q
16	45	Cédric Martel	Canada	3:09.19	+5.21	Q
17	24	Jonas Müller	Germany	3:09.44	+5.46	Q
18	39	Johan Calandry	France	3:09.45	+5.47	Q
19	10	Niccolo Bianchi	Italy	3:09.66	+5.68	Q
20	3	Nolan Gertsch	Switzerland	3:09.85	+5.87	Q
21	21	Aleš Řezáč	Czech Republic	3:09.86	+5.88	Q
22	8	Berik Boranbayev	Kazakhstan	3:10.43	+6.45	Q
23	17	Ritvars Ļepeškins	Latvia	3:11.16	+7.18	Q
24	26	Michal Adamov	Slovakia	3:11.71	+7.73	Q
25	23	Eduard Simbartl	Czech Republic	3:11.84	+7.86	Q
26	34	Bohdan Nikulin	Ukraine	3:12.27	+8.29	Q
27	27	Jan Zwatrzko	Poland	3:12.33	+8.35	Q
28	30	Lovrenc Karničar	Slovenia	3:12.74	+8.76	Q
29	29	Gaspard Cottaz	France	3:13.48	+9.50	Q
30	19	Landon Wyatt	United States	3:13.69	+9.71	Q
31	28	Jēkabs Skolnieks	Latvia	3:13.88	+9.90	
32	79	Kosuke Fujimoto	Japan	3:14.41	+10.43	
33	20	Topias Vuorela	Finland	3:14.58	+10.60	
34	80	Antoni Żółkiewski	Poland	3:15.51	+11.53	
35	35	Khuslen Ariunjargal	Mongolia	3:15.83	+11.85	
36	54	Niklas Walcher	Austria	3:18.10	+14.12	
37	37	Aubakir Totanov	Kazakhstan	3:18.78	+14.80	
38	31	Nazarii Teselskyi	Ukraine	3:18.93	+14.95	
39	44	Daujotas Jonikas	Lithuania	3:19.61	+15.63	
40	60	Mihail Carpov	Moldova	3:19.82	+15.84	
41	42	Usukh-Ireedui Turbat	Mongolia	3:19.94	+15.96	
42	40	Elisey Kuzmin	Slovakia	3:21.93	+17.95	
43	33	Samuel Johnson	Australia	3:22.63	+18.65	
44	72	Tine Šporn	Slovenia	3:22.67	+18.69	
45	65	Thomas Duncan	Great Britain	3:22.73	+18.75	
46	52	Karol Stachoń	Poland	3:23.16	+19.18	
47	58	Kim Ga-on	South Korea	3:23.44	+19.46	
48	1	Toni Andree Saarepuu	Estonia	3:23.49	+19.51	
49	43	Janik Brunhart	Liechtenstein	3:24.61	+20.63	
50	36	Matas Gražys	Lithuania	3:25.19	+21.21	
51	71	Boris Stanojević	Bosnia and Herzegovina	3:26.17	+22.19	
52	64	Kim Woo-suk	South Korea	3:27.29	+23.31	
53	49	Dani Cholakov	Bulgaria	3:28.37	+24.39	
54	68	Matija Štimac	Croatia	3:28.56	+24.58	
55	51	Justo Estévez	Argentina	3:29.37	+25.39	
56	38	Clancy Merrick Harvey	Australia	3:29.93	+25.95	
57	25	Daniel Varikov	Estonia	3:31.71	+27.73	
58	73	Hjalti Böðvarsson	Iceland	3:32.87	+28.89	
59	63	Song Chan-min	South Korea	3:33.79	+29.81	
60	59	Artur Saparbekov	Kyrgyzstan	3:34.07	+30.09	
61	55	Andrija Tošić	Serbia	3:36.45	+32.47	
62	69	Ștefan Paul Gherghel	Romania	3:36.49	+32.51	
63	70	Boris Štefančić	Croatia	3:37.31	+33.33	
64	47	Naravich Saisuk	Thailand	3:38.20	+34.22	
65	46	Patricio Meliñan	Chile	3:38.36	+34.38	
66	61	David Torevski	North Macedonia	3:39.01	+35.03	
67	53	Cristóbal Ríos	Chile	3:40.38	+36.40	
68	77	Martin Holló	Hungary	3:42.51	+38.53	
69	78	Avery Balbanida	Philippines	3:44.34	+40.36	
70	50	Gabriel César Santos	Brazil	3:44.98	+41.00	
71	57	Evangelos Athanasiou	Greece	3:45.68	+41.70	
72	66	Ioannis Georgakis	Greece	3:46.17	+42.19	
73	56	Thanatip Bunrit	Thailand	3:48.47	+44.49	
74	62	Lee Chieh-han	Chinese Taipei	3:53.05	+49.07	
75	48	Ian Francisco da Silva	Brazil	3:59.56	+55.58	
76	75	Amir Mohammad Abolhassanzadeh	Iran	4:00.61	+56.63	
77	74	Armen Margaryan	Armenia	4:08.06	+1:04.08	
78	76	Liu Hao-en	Chinese Taipei	4:17.16	+1:13.18	
79	67	Samuel Jaramillo	Colombia	4:19.30	+1:15.32	
80	32	Marcelino Tawk	Lebanon	4:22.40	+1:18.42	

=== Quarterfinals ===
Quarterfinal 1

Rank	Seed	Athlete	Country	Time	Deficit	Note
1	1	Elias Eischer	Austria	3:04.65		Q
2	11	Maximilian Wanger	Switzerland	3:04.69	+0.04	Q
3	20	Nolan Gertsch	Switzerland	3:04.88	+0.23	LL
4	10	Leevi Passila	Finland	3:04.99	+0.34	
5	30	Landon Wyatt	United States	3:13.95	+9.30	
6	21	Aleš Řezáč	Czech Republic	4:13.12	+1:08.47	

Quarterfinal 2

Rank	Seed	Athlete	Country	Time	Deficit	Note
1	4	Jakob Moch	Germany	3:08.46		Q
2	7	Quentin Lespine	France	3:08.83	+0.37	Q
3	17	Jonas Müller	Germany	3:09.61	+1.15	
4	24	Michal Adamov	Slovakia	3:09.71	+1.25	
5	27	Jan Zwatrzko	Poland	3:11.08	+2.62	
6	14	Peio Anarbe	Spain	3:33.29	+24.83	

Quarterfinal 3

Rank	Seed	Athlete	Country	Time	Deficit	Note
1	16	Cédric Martel	Canada	3:10.38		Q
2	15	Marco Pinzani	Italy	3:10.67	+0.29	Q
3	5	Kalle Tossavainen	Finland	3:10.89	+0.51	
4	25	Eduard Simbartl	Czech Republic	3:12.76	+2.38	
5	30	Landon Wyatt	United States	3:13.93	+3.55	
6	21	Aleš Řezáč	Czech Republic	3:15.90	+5.52	

Quarterfinal 4

Rank	Seed	Athlete	Country	Time	Deficit	Note
1	11	Milan Neukirchner	Germany	3:04.40		Q
2	2	Federico Pozzi	Italy	3:04.48	+0.08	Q
3	29	Gaspard Cottaz	France	3:04.83	+0.43	LL
4	19	Niccolo Bianchi	Italy	3:05.95	+1.55	
5	22	Berik Boranbayev	Kazakhstan	3:07.01	+2.61	
	9	Eamon Wilson	Canada	Disqualified		

Quarterfinal 5

Rank	Seed	Athlete	Country	Time	Deficit	Note
1	13	Tabor Greenberg	United States	3:07.08		Q
2	8	Måns Ravald	Sweden	3:07.77	+0.69	Q
3	3	Tage Börjesson	Sweden	3:07.95	+0.87	
4	28	Lovrenc Karničar	Slovenia	3:08.16	+1.08	
5	18	Johan Calandry	France	3:08.47	+1.39	
6	23	Ritvars Ļepeškins	Latvia	3:10.88	+3.80	

=== Semifinals ===
Semifinal 1

Rank	Seed	Athlete	Country	Time	Deficit	Note
1	20	Nolan Gertsch	Switzerland	3:10.60		Q
2	4	Jakob Moch	Germany	3:10.63	+0.03	Q
3	1	Elias Eischer	Austria	3:10.66	+0.06	
4	11	Maximilian Wanger	Switzerland	3:10.72	+0.12	
5	7	Quentin Lespine	France	3:10.09	+0.38	
6	16	Cédric Martel	Canada	3:11.34	+0.74	

Semifinal 2

Rank	Seed	Athlete	Country	Time	Deficit	Note
1	11	Milan Neukirchner	Germany	3:09.57		Q
2	2	Federico Pozzi	Italy	3:09.64	+0.07	Q
3	13	Tabor Greenberg	United States	3:09.69	+0.12	Q
4	8	Måns Ravald	Sweden	3:10.15	+0.58	Q
5	15	Marco Pinzani	Italy	3:10.15	+0.58	
6	29	Gaspard Cottaz	France	3:10.49	+0.92	

=== Final ===
The final was held at 13:54.

Rank	Seed	Athlete	Country	Time	Deficit	Note
1st place, gold medalist(s)	2	Federico Pozzi	Italy	3:16.27		
2nd place, silver medalist(s)	4	Jakob Moch	Germany	3:16.60	+0.33	
3rd place, bronze medalist(s)	13	Tabor Greenberg	United States	3:17.33	+1.06	
4	12	Milan Neukirchner	Germany	3:18.99	+2.72	
5	20	Nolan Gertsch	Switzerland	3:19.14	+2.87	
6	8	Måns Ravald	Sweden	3:27.21	+10.94	
