= Iran at the 2024 Winter Youth Olympics =

- Flag of Iran
- IOC code: IRN
- NOC: National Olympic Committee of the Islamic Republic of Iran

in Gangwon, South Korea 19 January 2024 – 1 February 2024
- Competitors: 5 in 2 sports
- Flag bearers (opening): Ali Boloukat & Parastoo Absalan
- Flag bearer (closing): TBD
- Medals: Gold 0 Silver 0 Bronze 0 Total 0

Winter Youth Olympics appearances (overview)
- 2012; 2016; 2020; 2024

Iran is scheduled to compete at the 2024 Winter Youth Olympics in Gangwon, South Korea, from January 19 to February 1, 2024, This will be Iran's fourth appearance at the Winter Youth Olympic Games, having competed at every Games since the inaugural edition in 2012.

The Iranian team consisted of five athletes (two men and three women) competing in two sports. Alpine skier Ali Boloukat and cross-country skier Parastoo Absalan were the country's flagbearers during the opening ceremony.

== Competitors ==
The following is the list of number of competitors (per gender) participating at the games per sport/discipline.

Sport	Men	Women	Total
Alpine skiing	1	1	2
Cross-country skiing	1	2	3
Total	2	3	5

== Alpine skiing ==
Iran qualified two alpine skiers (one per gender).

Athlete	Event	Run 1		Run 2		Total	
Athlete	Event	Time	Rank	Time	Rank	Time	Rank
Ali Boloukat	Men's super-G	—N/a				DNS	
Ali Boloukat	Men's giant slalom	1:04.21	60	54.87	43	1:59.08	45
Ali Boloukat	Men's slalom	59.65	58	DNF			
Ali Boloukat	Men's combined	DNS					
Sarina Ahmadpour	Women's giant slalom	1:02.47	49	1:05.49	38	2:07.96	38
Sarina Ahmadpour	Women's slalom	DNF					

== Cross-country skiing ==
Iran qualified three cross-country skiers (one man and two women).

Athlete	Event	Qualification		Quarterfinal		Semifinal		Final	
Athlete	Event	Time	Rank	Time	Rank	Time	Rank	Time	Rank
A. M. Abolhassanzadeh Amghani	Men's 7.5 km classical	—N/a						25:31.1	67
A. M. Abolhassanzadeh Amghani	Men's sprint freestyle	4:00.61	71	Did not advance					
Parastoo Absalan	Women's 7.5 km classical	—N/a						38:03.1	72
Parastoo Absalan	Women's sprint freestyle	5:05.70	74	Did not advance					
Melika Mirzaeidizaj	Women's 7.5 km classical	—N/a						37:36.0	71
Melika Mirzaeidizaj	Women's sprint freestyle	5:09.93	76	Did not advance					

== See also ==
- Iran at the 2024 Summer Olympics
