= Armenia at the 2012 Winter Youth Olympics =

- IOC code: ARM
- NOC: Armenian Olympic Committee
- Website: www.armnoc.am

in Innsbruck
- Competitors: 3 in 2 sports
- Flag bearer: Lilit Tonoyan
- Medals: Gold 0 Silver 0 Bronze 0 Total 0

Winter Youth Olympics appearances (overview)
- 2012; 2016; 2020; 2024

Armenia competed at the 2012 Winter Youth Olympics in Innsbruck, Austria. The Armenian team consisted of three athletes in two sports.

== Biathlon ==
Armenia qualified one girl.

Girl

Athlete	Event	Final		
Athlete	Event	Time	Misses	Rank
Zhenya Grigoryan	Sprint	DNF		

== Cross country skiing ==
Armenia qualified a team of one boy and girl.

Boy

Athlete	Event	Final	
Athlete	Event	Time	Rank
Hrachik Sahakyan	10km classical	38:25.7	45

Girl

Athlete	Event	Final	
Athlete	Event	Time	Rank
Lilit Tonoyan	5km classical	20:59.6	39

Sprint

Athlete	Event	Qualification		Quarterfinal		Semifinal		Final	
Athlete	Event	Total	Rank	Total	Rank	Total	Rank	Total	Rank
Hrachik Sahakyan	Boys' sprint	2:02.56	45	did not advance					
Lilit Tonoyan	Girls' sprint	2:28.11	39	did not advance					

== See also ==
- Armenia at the 2012 Summer Olympics
