= Nepal at the 2016 Winter Youth Olympics =

- IOC code: NEP
- NOC: Nepal Olympic Committee

in Lillehammer
- Competitors: 1 in 1 sport
- Medals: Gold 0 Silver 0 Bronze 0 Total 0

Winter Youth Olympics appearances
- 2012; 2016; 2020; 2024

Nepal competed at the 2016 Winter Youth Olympics in Lillehammer, Norway from 12 to 21 February 2016.

== Alpine skiing ==
Boys

Athlete	Event	Run 1		Run 2		Total	
Athlete	Event	Time	Rank	Time	Rank	Time	Rank
Saphal-Ram Shrestha	Slalom	DNF		did not advance			
Saphal-Ram Shrestha	Giant slalom	DNF		did not advance			

== See also ==
- Nepal at the 2016 Summer Olympics
