= Kosovo at the 2020 Winter Youth Olympics =

- IOC code: KOS
- NOC: Olympic Committee of Kosovo
- Website: www.noc-kosovo.org

in Lausanne
- Competitors: 2 in 1 sport
- Flag bearer: Drin Kokaj
- Medals: Gold 0 Silver 0 Bronze 0 Total 0

Winter Youth Olympics appearances (overview)
- 2020; 2024

Kosovo competed at the 2020 Winter Youth Olympics in Lausanne, Switzerland from 9 to 22 January 2020.

Kosovo made it Winter Youth Olympics debut.

== Alpine skiing ==
Athlete	Event	Run 1		Run 2		Total	
Athlete	Event	Time	Rank	Time	Rank	Time	Rank
Drin Kokaj	Boys' giant slalom	DSQ					
Drin Kokaj	Boys' slalom	DSQ					
Era Shala	Girls' slalom	DNS					

== Gallery ==
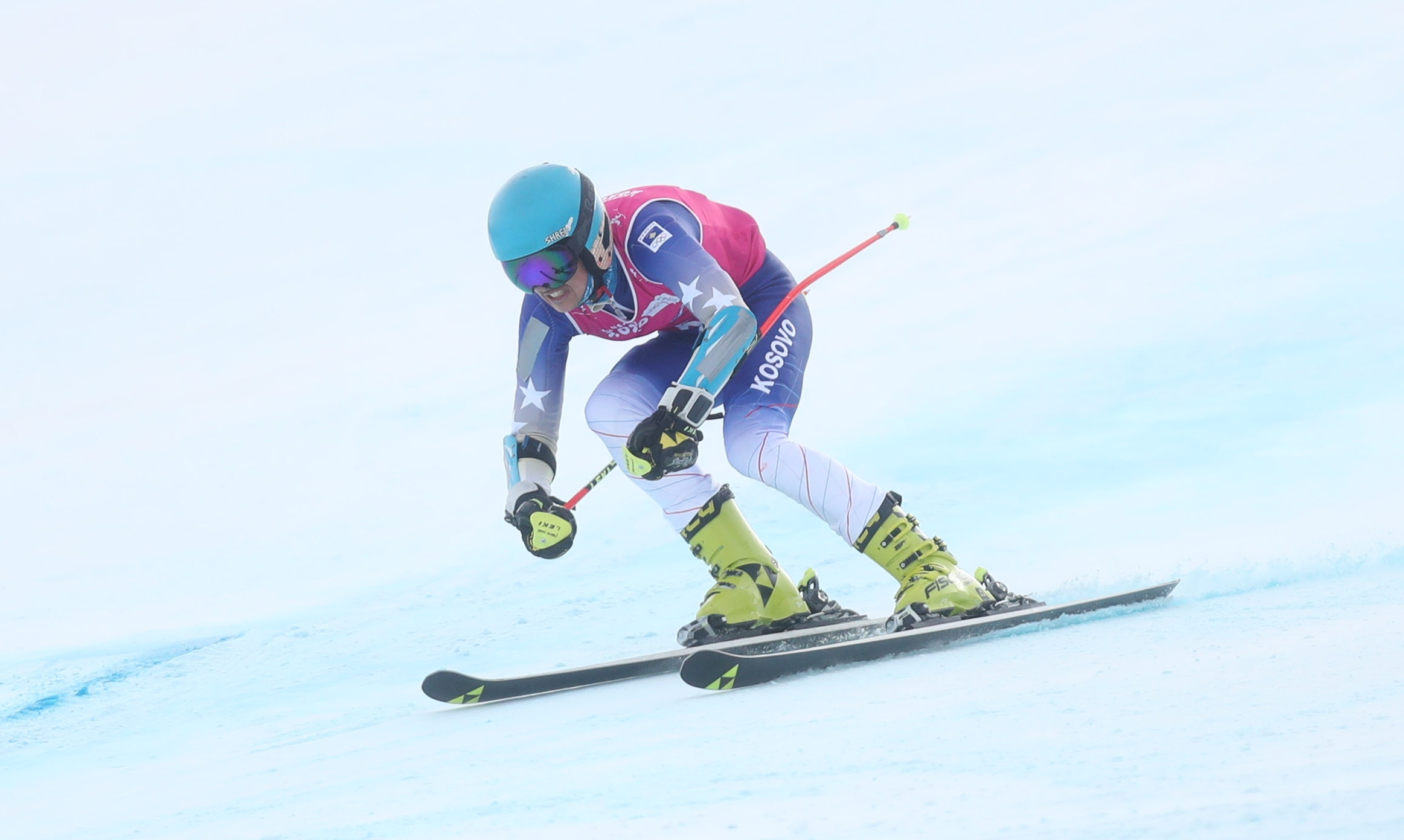
Drin Kokaj

== See also ==
- Kosovo at the Youth Olympics
- Kosovo at the 2020 Summer Olympics
