= Armenia at the Youth Olympics =

Performance of Armenia at the Youth Olympic Games

- IOC code: ARM
- NOC: Armenian Olympic Committee
- Website: www.armnoc.am (in Armenian)
- Medals Ranked 55th: Gold 3 Silver 3 Bronze 7 Total 13

Youth Olympics appearances (overview)
- 7

Summer appearances
- 2010; 2014; 2018; 2026

Winter appearances
- 2012; 2016; 2020; 2024

Armenia has participated at the Youth Olympic Games in every edition since the inaugural 2010 Games.

== Medal tables ==
=== Medals by Summer Games ===
Games	Athletes	Gold	Silver	Bronze	Total	Rank
2010 Singapore	14	0	1	3	4	67
(China) 2014 Nanjing	14	2	2	3	7	29
(Argentina) 2018 Buenos Aires	8	1	0	1	2	57
(Senegal) 2026 Dakar	5	0	0	1	1	88
Total		3	3	8	13	48

=== Medals by Winter Games ===
Games	Athletes	Gold	Silver	Bronze	Total	Rank
(Austria) 2012 Innsbruck	3	0	0	0	0	-
(Norway) 2016 Lillehammer	2	0	0	0	0	-
(Switzerland) 2020 Lausanne	1	0	0	0	0	-
(South Korea) 2024 Gangwon						
Total		0	0	0	0	-

=== Medals by summer sport ===
Sport	Gold	Silver	Bronze	Total
Weightlifting	3	1	1	5
Wrestling	0	1	4	5
Shooting	0	1	0	1
Boxing	0	0	1	1
Judo	0	0	1	1
Totals (5 entries)	3	3	7	13

=== Medals by winter sport ===
Sport	Gold	Silver	Bronze	Total
Totals (0 entries)	0	0	0	0

== List of medalists ==
=== Summer Games ===
Medal	Name	Games	Sport	Event
Silver	Gor Minasyan	2010 Singapore	Weightlifting	Boys' +85 kg
Bronze	Smbat Margaryan	2010 Singapore	Weightlifting	Boys' 56 kg
Bronze	Artak Hovhannisyan	2010 Singapore	Wrestling	Boys' Freestyle 46 kg
Bronze	Davit Ghazaryan	2010 Singapore	Judo	Boys' 66 kg
Gold	Hakob Mkrtchyan	(China) 2014 Nanjing	Weightlifting	Boys' 77 kg
Gold	Simon Martirosyan	(China) 2014 Nanjing	Weightlifting	Boys' +85 kg
Silver	Hrachik Babayan	(China) 2014 Nanjing	Shooting	Boys' 10 metre air rifle
Silver	Zaven Mikaelyan	(China) 2014 Nanjing	Wrestling	Boys' Greco-Roman 58 kg
Bronze	Narek Manasyan	(China) 2014 Nanjing	Boxing	Boys' 81 kg
Bronze	Vaghinak Matevosyan	(China) 2014 Nanjing	Wrestling	Boys' Freestyle 54 kg
Bronze	Sargis Hovsepyan	(China) 2014 Nanjing	Wrestling	Boys' Freestyle 76 kg
Gold	Karen Margaryan	(Argentina) 2018 Buenos Aires	Weightlifting	Boys' 77 kg
Bronze	Sahak Hovhannisyan	(Argentina) 2018 Buenos Aires	Wrestling	Boys' Greco-Roman 60 kg

== Flag bearers ==
#	Games	Season	Flag bearer	Sport
6	2020 Lausanne	Winter	Spartak Voskanyan	Cross-country skiing
5	2018 Buenos Aires	Summer	Artur Barseghyan	Swimming
4	2016 Lillehammer	Winter		
3	2014 Nanjing	Summer	Vahan Mkhitaryan	Swimming
2	2012 Innsbruck	Winter	Lilit Tonoyan	Cross-country skiing
1	2010 Singapore	Summer	Vasil Shahnazaryan	Archery

== See also ==
- Armenia at the Olympics
- Armenia at the Paralympics
- Sport in Armenia
