= Jakob Moch =

German cross-country skier (born 2006)

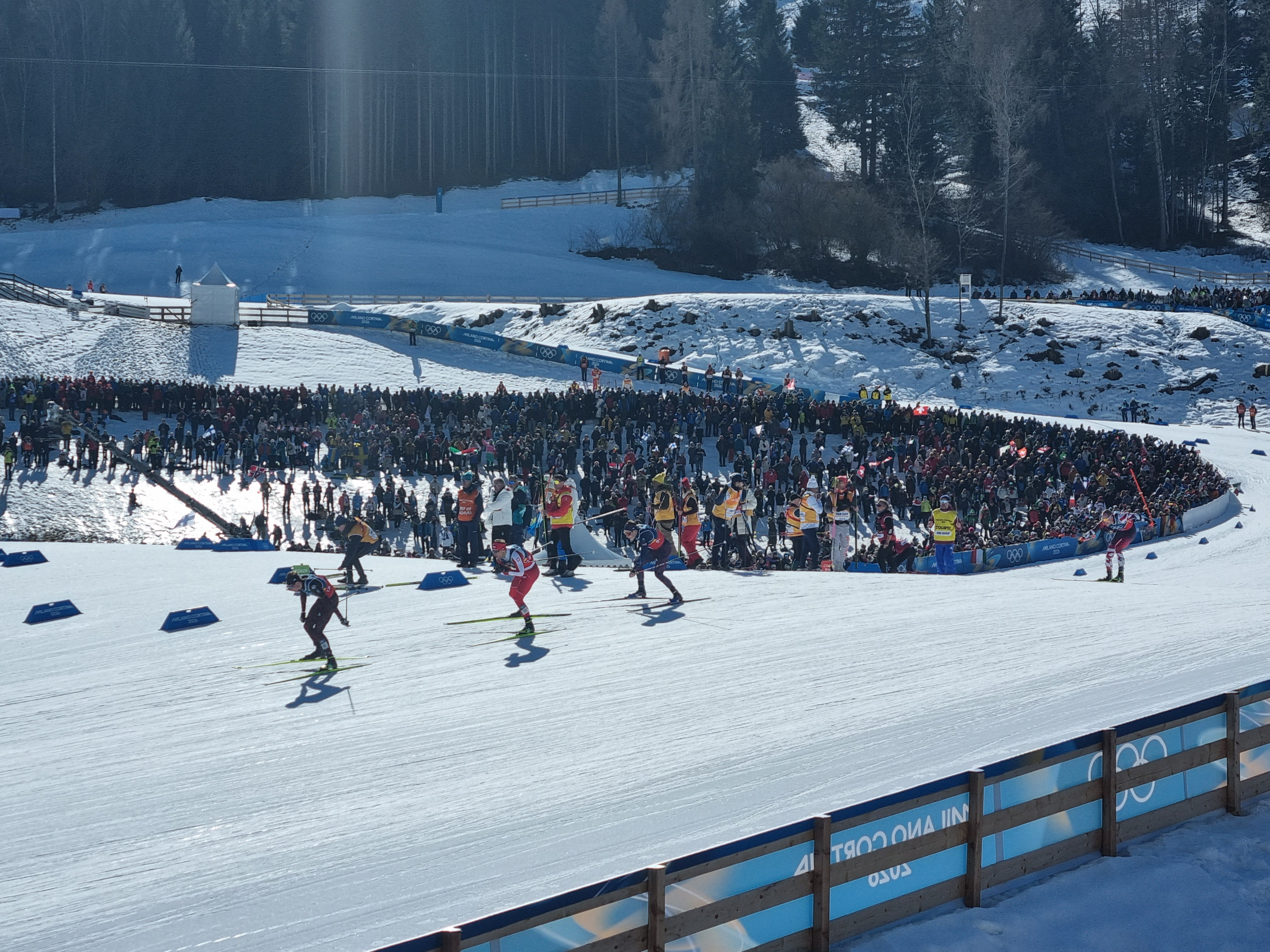

Personal information
- Full name: Jakob Elias Moch
- Nationality: Germany
- Born: 21 February 2006 (age 20) Kempten, Germany
- Height: 6 ft 0 in (183 cm)

Sport
- Sport: Skiing
- Club: WSV Isny

World Cup career
- Seasons: 1 – (2025)
Medal record
Men's cross-country skiing
Representing Germany
Junior World Championships
Bronze medal – third place	2025 Schilpario	10 km freestyle
Youth Winter Olympic Games
Gold medal – first place	2024 Gangwon	7.5 km classical
Gold medal – first place	2024 Gangwon	Mixed Relay
Silver medal – second place	2024 Gangwon	Sprint freestyle

Jakob Moch (born 21 February 2006) is a German cross-country skier.

He was the 2024 Youth Olympic Champion in the 7.5 km classical event and the silver medalist in the Sprint event. He also competed at the 2026 Winter Olympics in Milano-Cortina.

== Personal life ==
Jakob is the younger brother of Olympic cross-country skier Friedrich Moch. He attends college in University of Colorado Boulder.

== Cross-country skiing results ==
All results are sourced from the International Ski Federation (FIS).

=== Olympic Games ===
Year	Age	10 km individual	20 km skiathlon	50 km mass start	Sprint	4 × 7.5 km relay	Team sprint
2026	19	—	33	36	—	—	9

=== World Cup ===
==== Season standings ====
Season	Age	Discipline standings				Ski Tour standings
Season	Age	Overall	Distance	Sprint	U23	Tour de Ski
2026	19	90	60	106	14	41
