= Kyrgyzstan at the 2016 Winter Youth Olympics =

- IOC code: KGZ
- NOC: Kyrgyzstan Olympic Committee
- Website: www.olympic.kg

in Lillehammer
- Competitors: 1 in 1 sport
- Medals: Gold 0 Silver 0 Bronze 0 Total 0

Winter Youth Olympics appearances (overview)
- 2012; 2016; 2020; 2024

Kyrgyzstan competed at the 2016 Winter Youth Olympics in Lillehammer, Norway from 12 to 21 February 2016. The Kyrgyz team consisted of one athlete in one sport.

== Competitors ==
Sport	Men	Women	Total
Biathlon	0	1	1
Total	0	1	1

== Biathlon ==
Kyrgyzstan qualified one girl.

Girls

Athlete	Event	Final		
Athlete	Event	Time	Misses	Rank
Kunduz Abdykadyrova	Sprint	26.21.2	4	49
Kunduz Abdykadyrova	Pursuit	47:34.1	17	49

== See also ==
- Kyrgyzstan at the 2016 Summer Olympics
