= North Macedonia at the 2024 Winter Youth Olympics =

- Flag of North Macedonia
- IOC code: MKD
- NOC: Olympic Committee of North Macedonia

in Gangwon, South Korea 19 January 2024 – 1 February 2024
- Competitors: 4 in 2 sports
- Flag bearers (opening): David Torevski & Andrijana Kajevska
- Flag bearer (closing): TBD
- Medals: Gold 0 Silver 0 Bronze 0 Total 0

Winter Youth Olympics appearances
- 2012; 2016; 2020; 2024

North Macedonia is scheduled to compete at the 2024 Winter Youth Olympics in Gangwon, South Korea, from 19 January to 1 February 2024, This will be North Macedonia's fourth appearance at the Winter Youth Olympic Games, having competed at every Games since the inaugural edition in 2012.

The Macedonian team consisted of four athletes (two per gender) competing in two sports. Cross-country skier David Torevski and biathlete Andrijana Kajevska were the country's flagbearers during the opening ceremony.

== Competitors ==
The following is the list of number of competitors (per gender) participating at the games per sport/discipline.

Sport	Men	Women	Total
Biathlon	1	1	2
Cross-country skiing	1	1	2
Total	1	1	2

== Biathlon ==
Athlete	Event	Time	Misses	Rank
Blagoja Najdenoski	Men's sprint	27:46.6	4 (2+2)	83
Blagoja Najdenoski	Men's individual	56:39.5	9 (2+2+4+1)	90
Andrijana Kajevska	Women's sprint	40:12.9	7 (2+5)	93
Andrijana Kajevska	Women's individual	1:09:34.2	12 (3+3+4+2)	97

== Cross-country skiing ==
North Macedonia qualified two cross-country skiers (one per gender).

Athlete	Event	Qualification		Quarterfinal		Semifinal		Final	
Athlete	Event	Time	Rank	Time	Rank	Time	Rank	Time	Rank
David Torevski	Men's 7.5 km classical	—N/a						25:58.2	70
David Torevski	Men's sprint freestyle	3:39.01	66	Did not advance					
Mateja Trajkovska	Women's sprint freestyle	5:08.59	75	Did not advance					

== See also ==
- North Macedonia at the 2024 Summer Olympics
