= Alpine skiing at the 2024 Winter Youth Olympics =

Alpine skiing at the IV Winter Youth Olympic Games
- Venue: High1 Resort
- Dates: 21–26 January
- Competitors: 160 from 64 nations

Alpine skiing at the 2024 Winter Youth Olympics took place from 21 to 26 January 2024 at the High1 Resort, Jeongseon, South Korea.

== Schedule ==
All times are in KST (UTC+9)

| Date | Time | Event |
|---|---|---|
| 21 January | 10:00 | women's super-G |
| 21 January | 12:00 | men's super-G |
| 22 January | 09:00; 13:00 | women's combined |
| 22 January | 10:20; 14:15 | men's combined |
| 23 January | 10:00; 12:45 | women's giant slalom |
| 24 January | 10:00; 12:45 | men's giant slalom |
| 25 January | 09:30; 13:45 | women's slalom |
| 25 January | 10:45; 14:45 | men's slalom |
| 26 January | 11:00 | Mixed team |

== Events ==
=== Medal table ===
* Host nation (South Korea)

| Rank | Nation | Gold | Silver | Bronze | Total |
|---|---|---|---|---|---|
| 1 | Austria | 3 | 2 | 1 | 6 |
| 2 | Italy | 2 | 1 | 1 | 4 |
| 3 | Great Britain | 2 | 1 | 0 | 3 |
| 4 | Germany | 1 | 1 | 1 | 3 |
| 5 | France | 1 | 0 | 1 | 2 |
| 6 | Sweden | 0 | 3 | 2 | 5 |
| 7 | Switzerland | 0 | 1 | 1 | 2 |
| 8 | Finland | 0 | 0 | 1 | 1 |
| 8 | Slovakia | 0 | 0 | 1 | 1 |
| Totals (9 entries) | | 9 | 9 | 9 | 27 |

=== Men's events ===
| Event | Gold | | Silver | | Bronze | |
|---|---|---|---|---|---|---|
| Super-G | Benno Brandis; Germany | 54.42 | Asaja Sturm; Austria | 54.43 | Andrej Barnáš; Slovakia | 54.78 |
| Giant slalom | Nash Huot-Marchand; France | 1:34.37 | Zak Carrick-Smith; Great Britain | 1:35.30 | Florian Neumayer; Austria | 1:35.37 |
| Slalom | Zak Carrick-Smith; Great Britain | 1:38.61 | Elliot Westlund; Sweden | 1:38.66 | Nash Huot-Marchand; France | 1:38.87 |
| Combined | Zak Carrick-Smith; Great Britain | 1:49.46 | Alexander Ax Swartz; Sweden | 1:49.59 | Liam Liljenborg; Sweden | 1:50.30 |

=== Women's events ===
| Event | Gold | | Silver | | Bronze | |
|---|---|---|---|---|---|---|
| Super-G | Camilla Vanni; Italy | 53.54 | Eva Schachner; Austria | 53.61 | Shaienne Zehnder; Switzerland | 53.75 |
| Giant slalom | Giorgia Collomb; Italy | 1:41.10 | Shaienne Zehnder; Switzerland | 1:41.21 | Astrid Hedin; Sweden | 1:42.13 |
| Slalom | Maja Waroschitz; Austria | 1:37.49 | Charlotte Grandinger; Germany | 1:38.08 | Giorgia Collomb; Italy | 1:38.46 |
| Combined | Maja Waroschitz; Austria | 1:47.96 | Giorgia Collomb; Italy | 1:48.36 | Romy Ertl; Germany | 1:48.82 |

=== Mixed events ===
| Event | Gold | Silver | Bronze |
|---|---|---|---|
| Team | Austria; Maja Waroschitz; Florian Neumayer | Sweden; Astrid Hedin; Elliot Westlund | Finland; Amélie Björkstén; Altti Pyrrö |

== Qualification ==
NOCs can gain 3 quota places per gender by placing in the top 7 in the Marc Hodler Trophy or 2 quota places by placing outside of the top 7 in the Marc Hodler Trophy at the World Junior Alpine Skiing Championships 2023. Furthermore, the remaining NOCs would get quota places via the YOG FIS points' lists in giant slalom and slalom as of 18 December 2023.

=== Summary ===
This is the quota list as of December 18, 2023.

| NOC | men's | women's | Total |
|---|---|---|---|
| Albania | 0 | 1 | 1 |
| Algeria | 1 | 0 | 1 |
| Andorra | 1 | 0 | 1 |
| Argentina | 1 | 2 | 3 |
| Armenia | 1 | 0 | 1 |
| Australia | 1 | 1 | 2 |
| Austria | 3 | 3 | 6 |
| Belgium | 1 | 0 | 1 |
| Bosnia and Herzegovina | 1 | 1 | 2 |
| Brazil | 1 | 1 | 2 |
| Bulgaria | 1 | 0 | 1 |
| Canada | 1 | 2 | 3 |
| Chile | 1 | 2 | 3 |
| China | 1 | 1 | 2 |
| Croatia | 1 | 1 | 2 |
| Cyprus | 1 | 1 | 2 |
| Czech Republic | 1 | 2 | 3 |
| Estonia | 1 | 2 | 3 |
| Finland | 2 | 3 | 5 |
| France | 3 | 3 | 6 |
| Germany | 3 | 3 | 6 |
| Great Britain | 1 | 1 | 2 |
| Greece | 1 | 1 | 2 |
| Hong Kong | 1 | 1 | 2 |
| Hungary | 1 | 1 | 2 |
| Iceland | 1 | 1 | 2 |
| India | 1 | 0 | 1 |
| Iran | 1 | 1 | 2 |
| Ireland | 1 | 1 | 2 |
| Italy | 3 | 3 | 6 |
| Jamaica | 1 | 1 | 2 |
| Japan | 1 | 2 | 3 |
| Kazakhstan | 1 | 1 | 2 |
| Kenya | 1 | 0 | 1 |
| Kosovo | 1 | 1 | 2 |
| Kyrgyzstan | 1 | 1 | 2 |
| Latvia | 1 | 1 | 2 |
| Lebanon | 1 | 1 | 2 |
| Liechtenstein | 1 | 0 | 1 |
| Lithuania | 1 | ~~1~~ 0 | 1 |
| Monaco | 1 | 0 | 1 |
| Mongolia | 1 | 1 | 2 |
| Montenegro | 1 | 1 | 2 |
| Nepal | 1 | 1 | 2 |
| New Zealand | 1 | 1 | 2 |
| North Macedonia | 1 | 1 | 2 |
| Poland | 1 | 1 | 2 |
| Portugal | 1 | 1 | 2 |
| Romania | 1 | 1 | 2 |
| San Marino | 1 | 0 | 1 |
| Serbia | 1 | 1 | 2 |
| Slovakia | 2 | 3 | 5 |
| Slovenia | 2 | 3 | 5 |
| South Africa | 0 | 1 | 1 |
| South Korea | 3 | 3 | 6 |
| Spain | 1 | 1 | 2 |
| Sweden | 3 | 3 | 6 |
| Switzerland | 3 | 3 | 6 |
| Thailand | 1 | 1 | 2 |
| Turkey | 1 | 1 | 2 |
| United Arab Emirates | 1 | 0 | 1 |
| Ukraine | 1 | 1 | 2 |
| United States | 2 | 3 | 5 |
| Uzbekistan | 1 | 1 | 2 |
| Total: 64 NOCs | 80 | 80 | 160 |

- Denmark, Luxembourg, Mexico, Netherlands, Norway and Singapore declined all earned quotas.

=== Next eligible NOC per event ===
A country can be eligible for more than one quota spot per event in the reallocation process. Bolded NOCs have accepted quotas while NOCs with a strike through have already passed.

| men's | women's |
|---|---|
| **Kenya**; **Iran**; **United Arab Emirates**; **Thailand**; **Mongolia**; **Algeria**; ~~Georgia~~; **Jamaica**; **Nepal** | **Jamaica**; ~~Georgia~~; **India**; **United States**; **Canada**; **Japan**; **Finland**; **Slovenia**; **Czech Republic**; **Chile**; ~~Great Britain~~; **Slovakia** |
