= Federico Pozzi =

Italian cross-country skier (born 2006)

Personal information
- Nationality: Italy
- Born: 23 May 2006 (age 20)

Sport
- Sport: Cross-country skiing
- Club: GS Fiamme Oro
Medal record
Men's cross-country skiing
Representing Italy
Junior World Championships
Bronze medal – third place	2026 Lillehammer	Sprint freestyle
Winter Youth Olympics
Gold medal – first place	2024 Gangwon	Sprint freestyle

Federico Pozzi (born 23 May 2006) is an Italian cross-country skier. He was the 2024 Youth Olympic sprint champion. He also won bronze in the sprint event at the 2026 Nordic Junior World Ski Championships in the junior division.
