= Thomas Kaan Önol Lang =

Turkish alpine skier (born 2007)

Personal information
- Born: 20 July 2007 (age 19) Chelsea, London, England

Skiing career
- Country: Turkey
- Sport: Alpine skiing
- Disciplines: Slalom, giant slalom

Olympics
- Teams: 1 – (2026)
- Medals: 0

Thomas Kaan Önol Lang (born 20 July 2007) is a Turkish male Olympian alpine ski racer who specializes in the slalom and giant slalom events.

== Sport career ==
Kaan and his triplet sisters have been involved in skiing since they were three years old. He and his sisters competed in different distances of alpine skiing tournaments in France, and achieved good results. In February 2017, the triplets took the bronze medal in the slalom event of the age group of eleven at the skiing championships in Montgenèvre, France.

After becoming successful at the FIS tournaments in Erzurum, Turkey in 2025 and Bansko, Bulgaria in 2026, he qualified to respresent his country in the slalom event at the 2026 Winter Olympics in Milan, Italy.

== Personal life ==
Thomas Kaan Önol Lang was born as the male child of triplets to Swedish father Per Otot Thomas Lang and Turkish mother Zehra Ayşegül Önol Lang in Chelsea, London, England on 20 July 2007. His triplet sisters are Selin and Ayla.

His father is a former Swedish national alpine ski racer, and his mother is also an experienced skier. His parents own and operate a hotel in a ski resort in France. The family lives in the Turgutreis neighborhood in the Bodrum District of Muğla in southwestern Turkey, where his mother is in the tourism business.

Kaan attended Turgutreis Zeyyat Mandalinci Primary School in his hometown.

== Olympic results ==
Year
Year	Age	Slalom	Giant slalom	Super-G	Downhill	Team combined
2026	33	—	49	—	—	—
