= Sahil Thakur =

Indian skier (born 2007)

Personal information
- Born: 2007 (age 18–19) Manali, Himachal Pradesh, India

Skiing career
- Sport: Alpine skiing
- Disciplines: Slalom, giant slalom

Sahil Thakur (born 2007) is an alpine skier from Himachal Pradesh. He represented India at the 2024 Winter Youth Olympic Games in Gangwon, South Korea from 19 January to 1 February 2024. He is only the third Indian to compete in the Youth Winter Olympics. Aanchal Thakur (Slalom and Giant Slalom) took part in the inaugural 2012 Winter Youth Olympics in Austria and in 2016, Saurabh took part in the Super-G, Giant Slalom and Slalom events.

== Early life ==
Thakur hails from Solang, near Manali, Himachal Pradesh. His father Devi Chand is an apple farmer and also runs an adventure centre. Solang is situated at an altitude of 2,500 metres but Thakur heads to lower Himalayas, another 1000 m higher to practice in the snow-capped mountain slopes. His father was also a skier in the 1990s. His brother Rahul is also a skier and a gold medallist at the Khelo India games.

== Career ==
At the 2024 Winter Youth Olympics, competing with 1900 athletes from 90 countries at the Jeongseon High 1 Ski Resort, Thakur finished his first run in the 61st place among 78 skiers in his event, and had a DNF (Did not finish) in the second run. As a rookie, the experience stands him in good stead though it ended the Indian campaign. He is the only competitor from India at the Games.

At the first Khelo India winter games, Thakur won the bronze medal in the slalom. His journey began at the Gulmarg games and then he won gold in the giant slalom at the Nationals. In January 2023, he participated in the selection trials at Gangwon and earned a berth for the Youth Olympics. In November 2023, he took part in the UAE FIS Alpine Ski Slalom to prepare for the Olympics.
