= Biathlon at the 2024 Winter Youth Olympics – Women's individual =

Women's individual at the IV Winter Youth Olympic Games
- Venue: Alpensia Biathlon Centre
- Date: 20 January 2024
- Competitors: 99 from 37 nations

Medalists
1st place, gold medalist(s)		Ilona Plecháčová	Czech Republic
2nd place, silver medalist(s)		Marie Keudel	Germany
3rd place, bronze medalist(s)		Nayeli Mariotti Cavagnet	Italy

The women's 10 km individual biathlon competition at the 2024 Winter Youth Olympics will be held on 20 January 2024 at the Alpensia Biathlon Centre.

== Results ==
The race was started at 11:00 and finished at 12:30.

Rank	Bib	Name	Country	Time	Penalties (P+S+P+S) (Note: A penalty of 45 seconds was added to the athlete's final time for every shot they missed)	Deficit
1st place, gold medalist(s)	34	Ilona Plecháčová	Czech Republic	37:03.4	1 (0+1+0+0)	
2nd place, silver medalist(s)	46	Marie Keudel	Germany	38:13.1	2 (0+0+1+1)	+1:09.7
3rd place, bronze medalist(s)	61	Nayeli Mariotti Cavagnet	Italy	38:23.0	3 (0+1+1+1)	+1:19.6
4	87	Heda Mikolášová	Czech Republic	38:23.8	4 (1+2+1+0)	+1:20.4
5	68	Matilde Giordano	Italy	38:40.0	3 (2+0+1+0)	+1:36.6
6	43	Eiril Nordbø	Norway	38:40.1	3 (1+0+1+1)	+1:36.7
7	75	Alice Dusserre	France	39:09.5	3 (2+1+0+0)	+2:06.1
8	16	Carlotta Gautero	Italy	39:11.8	4 (0+1+1+2)	+2:08.4
9	60	Rosaly Stollberger	Austria	39:31.9	2 (0+1+1+0)	+2:28.5
10	54	Louise Roguet	France	39:37.6	4 (0+3+0+1)	+2:34.2
11	94	Alina Khmil	Ukraine	40:06.4	2 (0+2+0+0)	+3:03.0
12	39	Iryna Shevchenko	Ukraine	40:35.9	3 (0+2+0+1)	+3:32.5
13	89	Lucie Jandurová	Czech Republic	40:37.9	3 (1+0+0+2)	+3:34.5
14	15	Leonora Rønhede	Denmark	40:41.3	3 (0+3+0+0)	+3:37.9
15	23	Leni Dietersberger	Germany	40:45.0	3 (1+0+0+2)	+3:41.6
16	24	Valerie Křížová	Czech Republic	40:50.6	5 (1+0+2+2)	+3:47.2
17	27	Polina Putsko	Ukraine	40:56.4	4 (1+1+0+2)	+3:53.0
18	64	Amelia Liszka	Poland	41:04.1	4 (1+0+1+2)	+4:00.7
19	35	Raya Adzhamova	Bulgaria	41:04.6	3 (0+0+1+2)	+4:01.2
20	90	Lola Bugeaud	France	41:08.3	6 (0+2+1+3)	+4:04.9
21	80	Hanna Beck	Germany	41:27.4	5 (1+2+0+2)	+4:24.0
22	71	Alžbeta Garguláková	Slovakia	41:59.6	7 (2+1+1+3)	+4:56.2
23	85	Valeriia Sheihas	Ukraine	42:09.8	4 (0+2+1+1)	+5:06.4
24	20	Eveliina Hakala	Finland	42:30.8	6 (0+3+0+3)	+5:27.4
25	53	Majka Germata	Poland	42:31.7	5 (0+1+0+4)	+5:28.3
26	56	Molly Kafka	Switzerland	42:42.5	6 (1+2+1+2)	+5:39.1
27	62	Cheyenne Tirschmann	Canada	42:48.4	5 (1+2+1+1)	+5:45.0
28	77	Erika Kujala	Finland	42:49.8	6 (0+3+1+2)	+5:46.4
29	44	Anlourdees Veerpalu	Estonia	42:53.1	6 (1+0+3+2)	+5:49.7
30	36	Veronika Šteczová	Slovakia	42:58.8	1 (0+0+0+1)	+5:55.4
31	37	Ela Sever	Slovenia	42:59.6	9 (3+3+1+2)	+5:56.2
32	10	Julie Kvelvane	Norway	43:12.1	9 (3+3+3+0)	+6:08.7
33	67	Flora Csonka	Canada	43:16.4	4 (0+1+2+1)	+6:13.0
34	28	Lena Moretti	France	43:20.6	7 (3+1+2+1)	+6:17.2
35	17	Michaela Straková	Slovakia	43:26.9	7 (2+0+4+1)	+6:23.5
36	1	Alema Karabayeva	Kazakhstan	43:27.3	4 (1+0+1+2)	+6:23.9
37	25	Nikol Klenovska	Bulgaria	43:41.7	4 (0+1+1+2)	+6:38.3
38	91	Maëline Triponez	Switzerland	43:42.9	3 (0+1+1+1)	+6:39.5
39	99	Ilona Rantakömi	Finland	43:46.1	5 (1+2+0+2)	+6:42.7
40	92	Gabriela Gąsienica	Poland	43:47.6	4 (2+1+0+1)	+6:44.2
41	7	Kim Hye-won	South Korea	43:49.1	3 (1+1+0+1)	+6:45.7
42	12	Anna-Lena Wolf	Austria	43:49.2	6 (1+1+1+3)	+6:45.8
43	19	Eliane Kiser	Switzerland	43:49.6	4 (1+1+1+1)	+6:46.2
44	86	Irina Georgieva	Bulgaria	43:59.3	6 (2+2+1+1)	+6:55.9
45	6	Emily Campbell	United States	44:10.0	2 (1+0+1+0)	+7:06.6
46	84	Lena Baumann	Switzerland	44:16.4	7 (1+5+1+0)	+7:13.0
47	63	Ajda Špitalar	Slovenia	44:24.1	5 (0+1+2+2)	+7:20.7
48	97	Jana Duffner	Germany	44:24.4	8 (0+3+1+4)	+7:21.0
49	40	Hanni Koski	Finland	44:25.4	7 (2+4+1+0)	+7:22.0
50	96	Sara Tronrud	Norway	44:29.5	8 (2+1+1+4)	+7:26.1
51	88	Maya Rennermalm	Sweden	44:33.3	3 (0+1+1+1)	+7:29.9
52	98	Eva Hutter	Italy	44:34.3	7 (3+1+1+2)	+7:30.9
53	76	Ava McCann	Australia	44:43.0	6 (0+2+2+2)	+7:39.6
54	70	Laureen Simberg	Estonia	44:43.9	4 (1+0+1+2)	+7:40.5
55	29	Anine Karlsson	Sweden	44:54.1	5 (2+0+2+1)	+7:50.7
56	59	Alexandria Taylor	United States	44:54.7	6 (0+3+1+2)	+7:51.3
57	58	Evelina Mezentseva	Kazakhstan	45:00.3	8 (3+2+2+1)	+7:56.9
58	95	Lilly Fuchs	Austria	45:18.2	5 (1+3+0+1)	+8:14.8
59	4	Julia Bartlett	Canada	45:21.8	7 (2+2+2+1)	+8:18.4
60	49	Hanna Braun	Serbia	45:28.2	5 (1+2+1+1)	+8:24.8
61	2	Emilija Mincevič	Lithuania	45:56.9	4 (3+1+0+0)	+8:53.5
62	47	Bridget Harvey	Australia	46:06.2	7 (1+2+2+2)	+9:02.8
63	72	Maria Flå	Norway	46:29.5	9 (2+3+1+3)	+9:26.1
64	74	Lee Ju-hee	South Korea	46:30.5	4 (0+3+0+1)	+9:27.1
65	31	Ema Sobol	Croatia	46:31.7	8 (2+2+2+2)	+9:28.3
66	57	Madara Veckalniņa	Latvia	46:47.1	5 (2+1+2+0)	+9:43.7
67	93	Marta Wernersson	Sweden	46:49.9	4 (2+2+0+0)	+9:46.5
68	21	Kätrin Kärsna	Estonia	46:57.3	8 (2+3+0+3)	+9:53.9
69	26	Arina Rusu	Moldova	47:08.8	5 (2+1+0+2)	+10:05.4
70	32	Laura Bozóki	Hungary	47:14.2	4 (1+0+2+1)	+10:10.8
71	78	Molly Maybach	United States	47:22.5	8 (2+3+0+3)	+10:19.1
72	69	Krisztina Silló	Romania	47:29.1	7 (2+2+1+2)	+10:25.7
73	48	Cristina Lanau	Spain	47:30.5	9 (1+3+3+2)	+10:27.1
74	13	Josie Clifford	Great Britain	47:44.1	8 (3+1+1+3)	+10:40.7
75	79	Ilka Zleptnig	Austria	47:47.6	7 (0+3+2+2)	+10:44.2
76	45	Kim Min-ji	South Korea	47:56.3	9 (2+3+2+2)	+10:52.9
77	22	Keita Kolna	Latvia	48:11.8	5 (1+2+0+2)	+11:08.4
78	9	Zülal Türk	Turkey	48:21.7	5 (1+1+2+1)	+11:18.3
79	55	Nilla Norberg	Sweden	48:25.5	10 (3+4+2+1)	+11:22.1
80	81	Stella Bleidele	Latvia	48:43.5	4 (2+1+0+1)	+11:40.1
81	3	Alessandra Sydun-West	Australia	49:17.7	8 (2+2+1+3)	+12:14.3
82	83	Mariya Vorobyeva	Kazakhstan	49:18.4	9 (2+2+2+3)	+12:15.0
83	38	Aikaterini Vaikou	Greece	50:15.4	6 (1+2+2+1)	+13:12.0
84	52	Rusnė Motiejūnaitė	Lithuania	51:17.5	9 (2+3+1+3)	+14:14.1
85	42	Szidónia Kelemen	Romania	51:46.2	13 (4+3+4+2)	+14:42.8
86	30	Erdenetungalag Khash-Erdene	Mongolia	52:14.9	10 (3+2+2+3)	+15:11.5
87	51	Leona Pelko	Croatia	53:30.8	7 (0+2+1+4)	+16:27.4
88	65	Austėja Pupelytė	Lithuania	55:06.6	6 (0+3+2+1)	+18:03.2
89	8	Maria Tsiarka	Greece	55:12.1	13 (3+3+4+3)	+18:08.7
90	50	Nyamsuren Demuul	Mongolia	55:20.4	10 (3+1+4+2)	+18:17.0
91	5	Paula Morozan-Irinaru	Romania	56:08.5	8 (5+0+0+3)	+19:05.1
92	82	Lydia Tsiatsiou	Greece	56:44.1	10 (1+4+3+2)	+19:40.7
93	41	Mariana Lopes da Silva	Brazil	59:43.8	8 (2+2+2+2)	+22:40.4
94	73	Oyutsolmon Oleksandrovna	Mongolia	1:00:33.7	10 (3+2+4+1)	+23:30.3
95	66	Phitchapha Northong (Note: A penalty time adjustment of +2 minutes was assessed for failing to fire a round)	Thailand	1:02:30.3	13 (3+3+3+4)	+25:26.9
96	11	Jariyawadee Audomlap	Thailand	1:05:19.0	17 (4+4+4+5)	+28:15.6
97	14	Andrijana Kajevska	North Macedonia	1:09:34.2	12 (3+3+4+2)	+32:30.8
98	33	Parichat Bunmani (Note: A penalty time adjustment of +20 minutes was assessed for failing to fire a round on multiple occasions)	Thailand	1:28:10.1	20 (5+5+5+5)	+51:06.7
	18	Valentina Mercado	Chile	Did not start		
