= Cross-country skiing at the 2024 Winter Youth Olympics – Women's sprint =

Women's sprint at the IV Winter Youth Olympic Games
- Venue: Alpensia Biathlon Centre
- Date: 29 January
- Competitors: 79 from 41 nations

Medalists
1st place, gold medalist(s)		Elsa Tänglander	Sweden
2nd place, silver medalist(s)		Kajsa Johansson	Sweden
3rd place, bronze medalist(s)		Nelli-Lotta Karppelin	Finland

The girls' sprint freestyle cross-country skiing competition at the 2024 Winter Youth Olympics was held on 29 January at the Alpensia Biathlon Centre.

== Results ==
=== Qualifying ===
The qualifying was held at 10:30.

Rank	Bib	Athlete	Country	Time	Deficit	Note
1	10	Elsa Tänglander	Sweden	3:27.75		Q
2	1	Ilaria Gruber	Switzerland	3:28.55	+0.80	Q
3	8	Nelli-Lotta Karppelin	Finland	3:31.60	+3.85	Q
4	3	Lena Einsiedler	Germany	3:32.16	+4.41	Q
5	19	Annette Coupat	France	3:32.31	+4.56	Q
6	6	Kajsa Johansson	Sweden	3:33.49	+5.74	Q
7	11	Gerda Kivil	Estonia	3:35.89	+8.14	Q
8	33	Aramintha Bradford	Canada	3:36.97	+9.22	Q
9	29	Sydney Drevlow	United States	3:36.98	+9.23	Q
10	20	Lina Levet	France	3:38.22	+10.47	Q
11	7	Kateřina Dušková	Czech Republic	3:38.39	+10.64	Q
12	26	Sarah Hofmann	Germany	3:38.42	+10.67	Q
13	2	Eliška Polonská	Czech Republic	3:38.92	+11.17	Q
14	15	Hanni Koski	Finland	3:39.22	+11.47	Q
15	12	Neve Gerard	United States	3:39.84	+12.09	Q
16	22	Agathe Margreither	France	3:39.86	+12.11	Q
17	38	Emília Rendová	Slovakia	3:40.18	+12.43	Q
18	4	Heidi Bucher	Austria	3:40.39	+12.64	Q
19	5	Marie Schwitzer	Italy	3:40.94	+13.19	Q
20	25	Herta Rajas	Estonia	3:41.70	+13.95	Q
21	23	Rose Horning	United States	3:42.15	+14.40	Q
22	27	Kokoro Matsuzawa	Japan	3:42.32	+14.57	Q
23	50	Ula Kuhar	Slovenia	3:43.58	+15.83	Q
24	13	Leandra Schöpfer	Switzerland	3:44.77	+17.02	Q
25	39	Klaudia Radomyska	Poland	3:45.92	+18.17	Q
26	31	Leanne Gartner	Canada	3:47.18	+19.43	Q
27	18	Linda Kaparkalēja	Latvia	3:47.75	+20.00	Q
28	28	Katharina Engelhardt	Austria	3:48.32	+20.57	Q
29	34	Vanessa Cagnati	Italy	3:48.51	+20.76	Q
30	24	Hannah Lorenz	Germany	3:49.64	+21.89	Q
31	35	Laura Wantulok	Poland	3:49.66	+21.91	
32	40	Zala Zupan	Slovenia	3:50.31	+22.56	
33	17	Violetta Mitropolskaya	Kazakhstan	3:50.35	+22.60	
34	9	Signe Jakobsson	Finland	3:51.09	+23.34	
35	21	Naia González	Spain	3:51.16	+23.41	
36	14	Sofiia Shkatula	Ukraine	3:52.19	+24.44	
37	53	Larissza Vanda Bere	Hungary	3:53.72	+25.97	
38	32	Julia Rucka	Poland	3:53.87	+26.12	
39	36	Tereza Bukasová	Slovakia	3:54.33	+26.58	
39	41	Stella Giacomelli	Italy	3:54.33	+26.58	
41	37	Mariia Pavlenko	Ukraine	3:55.51	+27.76	
42	78	Yuka Fukuhara	Japan	3:56.78	+29.03	
43	47	Rosie Franzke	Australia	3:59.58	+31.83	
44	45	Elspeth Cruickshank	Great Britain	4:00.42	+32.67	
45	46	Sophie Forth	Great Britain	4:01.88	+34.13	
46	54	Uyanga Jamyanjav	Mongolia	4:03.61	+35.86	
47	52	Martīne Djatkoviča	Latvia	4:03.97	+36.22	
48	16	Maira Fernández	Argentina	4:04.48	+36.73	
49	51	Boglárka Páll	Romania	4:05.56	+37.81	
50	44	Nandintsetseg Naranbat	Mongolia	4:06.76	+39.01	
51	77	Heo Bu-gyeong	South Korea	4:08.78	+41.03	
52	48	Chiara Gašparac	Croatia	4:11.54	+43.79	
52	64	Christina Roza	Greece	4:11.54	+43.79	
54	59	Satara Moon	Australia	4:11.55	+43.80	
55	63	Elena Hristeva	Bulgaria	4:12.73	+44.98	
56	30	Milana Mamedova	Kazakhstan	4:13.16	+45.41	
57	61	Kingkan Duangjumpa	Thailand	4:14.18	+46.43	
58	62	Kang Han-eul	South Korea	4:18.92	+51.17	
59	76	María Kristín Ólafsdóttir	Iceland	4:21.18	+53.43	
60	72	Dóra Gaál	Hungary	4:21.21	+53.46	
61	65	Georgia Tsiarka	Greece	4:22.69	+54.94	
62	69	Ashley Tshanda Ongonga	Kenya	4:22.80	+55.05	
63	56	Nives Barićevac	Croatia	4:29.37	+1:01.62	
64	74	Teodora Delipara	Bosnia and Herzegovina	4:32.63	+1:04.88	
65	60	Paloma Angelino	Argentina	4:35.69	+1:07.94	
66	71	Kanyawat Limsamutchaikul	Thailand	4:39.17	+1:11.42	
67	73	Melika Jažić	Bosnia and Herzegovina	4:41.69	+1:13.94	
68	68	Yu Da-yeon	South Korea	4:41.96	+1:14.21	
69	42	Julia Reis	Brazil	4:42.16	+1:14.41	
70	70	Emilia Sainciuc	Moldova	4:44.19	+1:16.44	
71	57	Fenya Galstyan	Armenia	4:54.86	+1:27.11	
72	49	Mariana Lopes da Silva	Brazil	4:56.07	+1:28.32	
73	66	Juliana Castaño	Colombia	5:00.89	+1:33.14	
74	58	Parastoo Absalan	Iran	5:05.70	+1:37.95	
75	75	Mateja Trajkovska	North Macedonia	5:08.59	+1:40.84	
76	67	Melika Mirzaeidizaj	Iran	5:09.93	+1:42.18	
77	43	Syrelle Lozom	Lebanon	5:15.32	+1:47.57	
78	55	Karen Succar	Lebanon	5:33.30	+2:05.55	
79	79	Tsai Chiao-wei	Chinese Taipei	6:00.57	+2:32.82	

=== Quarterfinals ===
Quarterfinal 1

Rank	Seed	Athlete	Country	Time	Deficit	Note
1	1	Elsa Tänglander	Sweden	3:39.15		Q
2	11	Kateřina Dušková	Czech Republic	3:39.77	+0.62	Q
3	20	Herta Rajas	Estonia	3:41.44	+2.29	
4	21	Rose Horning	United States	3:42.49	+3.34	
5	10	Lina Levet	France	3:44.54	+5.39	
6	30	Hannah Lorenz	Germany	3:50.83	+11.68	

Quarterfinal 2

Rank	Seed	Athlete	Country	Time	Deficit	Note
1	14	Hanni Koski	Finland	3:39.31		Q
2	4	Lena Einsiedler	Germany	3:40.48	+1.17	Q
3	7	Gerda Kivil	Estonia	3:40.49	+1.18	
4	24	Leandra Schöpfer	Switzerland	3:41.13	+1.82	
5	27	Linda Kaparkalēja	Latvia	3:55.89	+16.58	
6	17	Emília Rendová	Slovakia	4:04.19	+24.88	

Quarterfinal 3

Rank	Seed	Athlete	Country	Time	Deficit	Note
1	5	Annette Coupat	France	3:40.16		Q
2	6	Kajsa Johansson	Sweden	3:40.33	+0.17	Q
3	16	Agathe Margreither	France	3:41.52	+1.36	
4	15	Neve Gerard	United States	3:41.61	+1.45	
5	25	Klaudia Radomyska	Poland	3:50.14	+9.98	
6	26	Leanne Gartner	Canada	4:05.60	+25.44	

Quarterfinal 4

Rank	Seed	Athlete	Country	Time	Deficit	Note
1	2	Ilaria Gruber	Switzerland	3:36.63		Q
2	12	Sarah Hofmann	Germany	3:37.36	+0.73	Q
3	19	Marie Schwitzer	Italy	3:37.59	+0.96	LL
4	22	Kokoro Matsuzawa	Japan	3:38.06	+1.43	
5	29	Vanessa Cagnati	Italy	3:38.74	+2.11	
6	9	Sydney Drevlow	United States	3:39.01	+2.38	

Quarterfinal 5

Rank	Seed	Athlete	Country	Time	Deficit	Note
1	3	Nelli-Lotta Karppelin	Finland	3:33.31		Q
2	18	Heidi Bucher	Austria	3:34.19	+0.88	Q
3	8	Aramintha Bradford	Canada	3:36.77	+3.46	LL
4	13	Eliška Polonská	Czech Republic	3:37.70	+4.39	
5	28	Katharina Engelhardt	Austria	3:45.92	+12.61	
6	23	Ula Kuhar	Slovenia	3:46.03	+12.72	

=== Semifinals ===
Semifinal 1

Rank	Seed	Athlete	Country	Time	Deficit	Note
1	1	Elsa Tänglander	Sweden	3:38.68		Q
2	11	Kateřina Dušková	Czech Republic	3:38.77	+0.09	Q
3	5	Annette Coupat	France	3:39.12	+0.44	
4	4	Lena Einsiedler	Germany	3:39.54	+0.86	
5	19	Marie Schwitzer	Italy	3:43.93	+5.25	
6	14	Hanni Koski	Finland	3:48.59	+9.91	

Semifinal 2

Rank	Seed	Athlete	Country	Time	Deficit	Note
1	3	Nelli-Lotta Karppelin	Finland	3:36.45		Q
2	18	Heidi Bucher	Austria	3:36.75	+0.30	Q
3	6	Kajsa Johansson	Sweden	3:37.00	+0.55	LL
4	12	Sarah Hofmann	Germany	3:37.85	+1.40	LL
5	8	Aramintha Bradford	Canada	3:44.90	+8.45	
6	2	Ilaria Gruber	Switzerland	4:08.09	+31.64	

=== Final ===
The final was held at 13:54.

Rank	Seed	Athlete	Country	Time	Deficit	Note
1st place, gold medalist(s)	1	Elsa Tänglander	Sweden	3:33.98		
2nd place, silver medalist(s)	6	Kajsa Johansson	Sweden	3:34.24	+0.26	
3rd place, bronze medalist(s)	3	Nelli-Lotta Karppelin	Finland	3:34.46	+0.48	
4	12	Sarah Hofmann	Germany	3:41.52	+7.54	
5	11	Kateřina Dušková	Czech Republic	3:43.52	+9.54	
6	18	Heidi Bucher	Austria	3:48.78	+14.80	
