= Cross-country skiing at the 2024 Winter Youth Olympics – Women's 7.5 kilometre classical =

Women's 7.5 kilometre classical at the IV Winter Youth Olympic Games
- Venue: Alpensia Biathlon Centre
- Date: 30 January
- Competitors: 78 from 40 nations

Medalists
1st place, gold medalist(s)		Nelli-Lotta Karppelin	Finland
2nd place, silver medalist(s)		Agathe Margreither	France
3rd place, bronze medalist(s)		Annette Coupat	France

The women's 7.5 kilometre classical cross-country skiing competition at the 2024 Winter Youth Olympics was held on 30 January at the Alpensia Biathlon Centre.

== Results ==
The race was held at 10:30.

Rank	Bib	Athlete	Country	Time	Deficit
1st place, gold medalist(s)	77	Nelli-Lotta Karppelin	Finland	22:19.6	
2nd place, silver medalist(s)	53	Agathe Margreither	France	22:30.1	+10.5
3rd place, bronze medalist(s)	61	Annette Coupat	France	22:32.3	+12.7
4	75	Elsa Tänglander	Sweden	22:43.4	+23.8
5	56	Sarah Hofmann	Germany	22:44.4	+24.8
6	65	Neve Gerard	United States	22:45.1	+25.5
7	68	Marie Schwitzer	Italy	22:45.3	+25.7
8	64	Heidi Bucher	Austria	22:50.7	+31.1
9	72	Leandra Schöpfer	Switzerland	22:59.4	+39.8
10	74	Gerda Kivil	Estonia	23:05.7	+46.1
11	69	Kateřina Dušková	Czech Republic	23:06.6	+47.0
12	48	Hannah Lorenz	Germany	23:14.3	+54.7
13	67	Rose Horning	United States	23:16.4	+56.8
14	71	Hanni Koski	Finland	23:17.9	+58.3
15	73	Lena Einsiedler	Germany	23:21.3	+1:01.7
16	1	Aramintha Bradford	Canada	23:21.6	+1:02.0
17	77	Kajsa Johansson	Sweden	23:23.4	+1:03.8
18	63	Vanessa Cagnati	Italy	23:26.5	+1:06.9
19	57	Sydney Drevlow	United States	23:30.9	+1:11.3
20	31	Ula Kuhar	Slovenia	23:33.0	+1:13.4
21	58	Eliška Polonská	Czech Republic	23:42.7	+1:23.1
22	36	Leanne Gartner	Canada	23:46.1	+1:26.5
23	78	Kokoro Matsuzawa	Japan	24:02.6	+1:43.0
24	66	Sofiia Shkatula	Ukraine	24:04.8	+1:45.2
25	55	Violetta Mitropolskaya	Kazakhstan	24:06.8	+1:47.2
26	29	Katharina Engelhardt	Austria	24:07.2	+1:47.6
27	40	Lina Levet	France	24:12.3	+1:52.7
28	41	Herta Rajas	Estonia	24:15.5	+1:55.9
29	70	Ilaria Gruber	Switzerland	24:28.2	+2:08.6
30	46	Yuka Fukuhara	Japan	24:29.2	+2:09.6
31	54	Stella Giacomelli	Italy	24:41.1	+2:21.5
32	62	Emília Rendová	Slovakia	24:53.7	+2:34.1
33	43	Klaudia Radomyska	Poland	24:54.5	+2:34.9
34	38	Mariia Pavlenko	Ukraine	24:55.7	+2:36.1
35	42	Tereza Bukasová	Slovakia	25:08.3	+2:48.7
36	21	Zala Zupan	Slovenia	25:15.5	+2:55.9
37	37	Naia González	Spain	25:25.8	+3:06.2
38	9	Rosie Franzke	Australia	25:32.7	+3:13.1
39	59	Julia Rucka	Poland	25:34.7	+3:15.1
40	39	Laura Wantulok	Poland	25:43.3	+3:23.7
41	50	Larissza Vanda Bere	Hungary	25:47.0	+3:27.4
42	52	Maira Fernández	Argentina	26:05.2	+3:45.6
43	25	Elspeth Cruickshank	Great Britain	26:16.7	+3:57.1
44	7	Satara Moon	Australia	26:23.2	+4:03.6
45	60	Signe Jakobsson	Finland	26:25.8	+4:06.2
46	26	Nandintsetseg Naranbat	Mongolia	26:43.4	+4:23.8
47	35	Boglárka Páll	Romania	26:43.7	+4:24.1
48	33	Heo Bu-gyeong	South Korea	26:53.6	+4:34.0
49	12	Uyanga Jamyanjav	Mongolia	27:11.8	+4:52.2
50	22	Sophie Forth	Great Britain	27:17.6	+4:58.0
51	28	Elena Hristeva	Bulgaria	27:21.9	+5:02.3
52	44	Milana Mamedova	Kazakhstan	27:28.8	+5:09.2
53	15	Martīne Djatkoviča	Latvia	28:01.6	+5:42.0
54	5	María Kristín Ólafsdóttir	Iceland	28:12.8	+5:53.2
55	23	Chiara Gašparac	Croatia	28:21.5	+6:01.9
56	10	Fenya Galstyan	Armenia	28:51.9	+6:32.3
57	17	Kang Han-eul	South Korea	29:12.2	+6:52.6
58	19	Paloma Angelino	Argentina	29:18.8	+6:59.2
59	6	Dóra Gaál	Hungary	29:33.5	+7:13.9
60	20	Nives Barićevac	Croatia	29:51.4	+7:31.8
61	16	Kingkan Duangjumpa	Thailand	30:03.0	+7:43.4
62	14	Yu Da-yeon	South Korea	30:05.7	+7:46.1
63	18	Ashley Tshanda Ongonga	Kenya	30:26.1	+8:06.5
64	13	Julia Reis	Brazil	31:14.5	+8:54.9
65	11	Kanyawat Limsamutchaikul	Thailand	31:46.4	+9:26.8
66	49	Christina Roza	Greece	32:29.6	+10:10.0
67	47	Syrelle Lozom	Lebanon	33:46.1	+11:26.5
68	45	Teodora Delipara	Bosnia and Herzegovina	33:55.9	+11:36.3
69	24	Melika Jažić	Bosnia and Herzegovina	36:52.1	+14:32.5
70	8	Mariana Lopes da Silva	Brazil	37:14.3	+14:54.7
71	32	Melika Mirzaeidizaj	Iran	37:36.0	+15:16.4
72	27	Parastoo Absalan	Iran	38:03.1	+15:43.5
73	2	Juliana Castaño	Colombia	38:54.2	+16:34.6
74	30	Karen Succar	Lebanon	39:14.7	+16:55.1
75	4	Emilia Sainciuc	Moldova	40:46.7	+18:27.1
76	3	Tsai Chiao-wei	Chinese Taipei	46:43.5	+24:23.9
	34	Georgia Tsiarka	Greece	DSQ	
	51	Linda Kaparkalēja	Latvia	DNS	
