= Biathlon at the 2024 Winter Youth Olympics =

Biathlon at the IV Winter Youth Olympic Games
- Venue: Alpensia Biathlon Centre
- Dates: 20–24 January
- Competitors: 199 from 40 nations

Biathlon at the 2024 Winter Youth Olympics took place from 20 to 24 January 2024 at the Alpensia Biathlon Centre, Gangwon, South Korea.

== Schedule ==
All times are in KST (UTC+9)

Date	Time	Event
20 January	11:00	Women's 10 km individual
20 January	14:00	Men's 12.5 km individual
21 January	11:00	Single mixed relay
23 January	10:30	Men's 7.5 km sprint
23 January	13:30	Women's 6 km sprint
24 January	10:30	Mixed relay

== Medal summary ==
=== Medal table ===
* Host nation (South Korea)

Rank	Nation	Gold	Silver	Bronze	Total
1	France	3	1	1	5
2	Italy	2	0	1	3
3	Czech Republic	1	0	1	2
4	Norway	0	2	1	3
5	Germany	0	2	0	2
6	Slovenia	0	1	0	1
7	Slovakia	0	0	1	1
7	Ukraine	0	0	1	1
Totals (8 entries)		6	6	6	18

=== Medalists ===
Event	Gold		Silver		Bronze	
Men's sprint	Antonin Guy; France	20:57.7 (0+1)	Tov Røysland; Norway	21:29.5 (0+1)	Flavio Guy; France	21:55.2 (3+1)
Men's individual	Antonin Guy; France	41:45.2 (1+1+0+1)	Storm Veitsle; Norway	42:25.5 (2+0+1+0)	Markus Sklenárik; Slovakia	43:01.5 (1+0+0+0)
Women's sprint	Carlotta Gautero; Italy	19:40.2 (1+0)	Ela Sever; Slovenia	20:15.3 (2+1)	Polina Putsko; Ukraine	20:54.1 (0+1)
Women's individual	Ilona Plecháčová; Czech Republic	37:03.4 (0+1+0+0)	Marie Keudel; Germany	38:13.1 (0+0+1+1)	Nayeli Mariotti Cavagnet; Italy	38:23.0 (0+1+1+1)
Single mixed relay	France; Alice Dusserre; Antonin Guy	44:08.2 (0+0) (0+2) (0+2) (0+0) (0+0) (0+0) (0+0) (0+1)	Germany; Marie Keudel; Korbinian Kübler	44:58.2 (0+0) (0+2) (0+0) (0+1) (0+0) (0+1) (0+0) (0+2)	Norway; Eiril Nordbø; Storm Veitsle	44:58.5 (0+2) (0+1) (0+0) (1+3) (0+1) (0+1) (0+0) (0+1)
Mixed relay	Italy; Nayeli Mariotti Cavagnet; Carlotta Gautero; Hannes Bacher; Michel Deval	1:15:12.4 (0+0) (0+1) (0+0) (0+2) (1+3) (2+3) (0+1) (0+1)	France; Alice Dusserre; Louise Roguet; Flavio Guy; Antonin Guy	1:16:25.4 (0+1) (0+1) (0+2) (1+3) (0+2) (1+3) (0+0) (0+1)	Czech Republic; Heda Mikolášová; Ilona Plecháčová; Jakub Neuhäuser; Lukáš Kulhánek	1:18:23.4 (0+2) (0+1) (0+0) (0+1) (1+3) (1+3) (1+3) (2+3)

== Qualification ==
The following NOCs received quotas:

NOC	Men's	Women's	Total
Australia	3	3	6
Austria	4	4	8
~~Belgium~~	~~3~~ 0	~~3~~ 0	0
Bosnia and Herzegovina	~~3~~ 2	0	2
Brazil	0	~~0~~ 1	1
Bulgaria	3	3	6
Canada	3	3	6
Chile	0	~~0~~ 1	1
Croatia	~~3~~ 2	~~3~~ 2	4
Czech Republic	4	4	8
Denmark	0	~~0~~ 1	1
Estonia	3	3	6
Finland	4	4	8
France	4	4	8
Germany	4	4	8
Great Britain	~~3~~ 2	~~3~~ 1	3
Greece	3	3	6
Hungary	~~0~~ 1	~~0~~ 1	2
Italy	4	4	8
Kazakhstan	3	3	6
Kyrgyzstan	~~0~~ 1	0	1
Latvia	3	3	6
Lithuania	3	3	6
Moldova	~~3~~ 2	~~0~~ 1	3
Mongolia	3	3	6
New Zealand	~~0~~ 1	0	1
North Macedonia	~~0~~ 1	~~0~~ 1	2
Norway	4	4	8
Poland	3	3	6
Romania	3	3	6
Serbia	~~0~~ 1	~~3~~ 1	2
Slovakia	3	3	6
Slovenia	3	~~3~~ 2	5
South Korea	3	3	6
Spain	~~0~~ 1	~~0~~ 1	2
Sweden	4	4	8
Switzerland	4	4	8
Thailand	~~0~~ 1	3	4
Turkey	0	~~0~~ 1	1
Ukraine	4	4	8
United States	3	3	6
Total: 40 NOCs	100	99	199
