= Cross-country skiing at the 2024 Winter Youth Olympics =

Cross-country skiing at the IV Winter Youth Olympic Games
- Venue: Alpensia Biathlon Centre
- Dates: 29 January – 1 February
- Competitors: 160

Cross-country skiing at the 2024 Winter Youth Olympics took place from 29 January to 1 February 2024 at the Alpensia Biathlon Centre, Daegwallyeong-myeon, South Korea.

== Schedule ==
All times are in KST (UTC+9)

Date	Time	Event
29 January	11:00	Men's/Women's sprint free qualification
29 January	13:00	Men's/Women's sprint free finals
30 January	11:00	Women's 7.5 kilometres classical
30 January	13:30	Men's 7.5 kilometres classical
1 February	11:00	Mixed 4 × 5 kilometres relay

== Medal summary ==
=== Medal table ===
Rank	Nation	Gold	Silver	Bronze	Total
1	Germany	2	2	0	4
2	Sweden	1	1	0	2
3	Finland	1	0	1	2
4	Italy	1	0	0	1
5	France	0	2	2	4
6	Switzerland	0	0	1	1
6	United States	0	0	1	1
Totals (7 entries)		5	5	5	15

=== Medalists ===
Event	Gold		Silver		Bronze	
Men's sprint freestyle	Federico Pozzi; Italy		Jakob Moch; Germany		Tabor Greenberg; United States	
Men's 7.5 kilometre classical	Jakob Moch; Germany	19:47.2	Jonas Müller; Germany	19:52.6	Quentin Lespine; France	19:54.1
Women's sprint freestyle	Elsa Tänglander; Sweden		Kajsa Johansson; Sweden		Nelli-Lotta Karppelin; Finland	
Women's 7.5 kilometre classical	Nelli-Lotta Karppelin; Finland	22:19.6	Agathe Margreither; France	22:30.1	Annette Coupat; France	22:32.3
4 × 5 kilometre mixed relay	Germany; Sarah Hoffmann; Jonas Müller; Lena Einsiedler; Jakob Moch	53:07.3	France; Agathe Margreither; Gaspard Cottaz; Annette Coupat; Quentin Lespine	53:13.0	Switzerland; Leandra Schöpfer; Nolan Gertsch; Ilaria Gruber; Maximilian Wanger	53:13.3

== Qualification ==
NOCs can gain 3 quota places per gender by placing in the Marc Hodler Trophy at the 2023 Nordic Junior World Ski Championships. Furthermore, the remaining NOCs would get quota places via the YOG FIS points' lists in Sprint and Distance events as of 18 December 2023.

=== Summary ===
This is the final quota list.

NOC	Men's	Women's	Total
Argentina	1	2	3
Armenia	1	1	2
Australia	2	2	4
Austria	2	2	4
Bosnia and Herzegovina	1	2	3
Brazil	2	2	4
Bulgaria	1	1	2
Canada	2	2	4
Chile	2	1	3
Chinese Taipei	1	1	2
Colombia	1	1	2
Croatia	1	2	3
Czech Republic	2	2	4
Estonia	2	2	4
Finland	3	3	6
France	3	3	6
Germany	3	3	6
Great Britain	1	2	3
Greece	2	2	4
Hungary	1	2	3
Iceland	1	1	2
Iran	1	2	3
Italy	3	3	6
Japan	~~3~~ 2	~~3~~ 2	4
Kazakhstan	2	2	4
Kenya	0	1	1
Kyrgyzstan	1	0	1
Latvia	2	2	4
Lebanon	2	2	4
Liechtenstein	1	0	1
Lithuania	2	1	3
Moldova	1	1	2
Mongolia	2	2	4
North Macedonia	1	1	2
Philippines	1	0	1
Poland	3	3	6
Romania	1	1	2
Serbia	1	~~1~~ 0	1
Slovakia	2	2	4
Slovenia	2	2	4
South Korea	3	3	6
Spain	~~2~~ 1	~~2~~ 1	2
Sweden	2	2	4
Switzerland	2	2	4
Thailand	2	1	3
Ukraine	2	2	4
United States	3	3	6
Total: 47 NOCs	80	80	160

- Belgium, Denmark, Norway and Turkey declined all quotas earned.

=== Next eligible NOC per event ===
A country can be eligible for more than one quota spot per event in the reallocation process. Bolded NOCs have accepted quotas while NOCs with a strike through have already passed.

Men's	Women's
**Lithuania**; **Mongolia**; ~~Bosnia and Herzegovina~~; **Thailand**; **Greece**; ~~Belgium~~; ~~Romania~~; **Chile**; **Brazil**; **Slovenia**; **Lebanon**	**Lebanon**; **Croatia**; ~~Romania~~; **Iran**; **Brazil**; **Bosnia and Herzegovina**; **Argentina**; **Mongolia**
