= Biathlon at the 2024 Winter Youth Olympics – Women's sprint =

Women's sprint at the IV Winter Youth Olympic Games
- Venue: Alpensia Biathlon Centre
- Date: 23 January 2024
- Competitors: 98 from 37 nations
- Winning time: 19:40.2

Medalists
1st place, gold medalist(s)		Carlotta Gautero	Italy
2nd place, silver medalist(s)		Ela Sever	Slovenia
3rd place, bronze medalist(s)		Polina Putsko	Ukraine

The women's 6 km sprint biathlon competition at the 2024 Winter Youth Olympics was held on 23 January 2024 at the Alpensia Biathlon Centre.

== Results ==
The race was started at 13:30 and finished at 14:29.

Rank	Bib	Name	Country	Time	Penalties (P+S)	Deficit
1st place, gold medalist(s)	66	Carlotta Gautero	Italy	19:40.2	1 (1+0)	
2nd place, silver medalist(s)	43	Ela Sever	Slovenia	20:15.3	3 (2+1)	+35.1
3rd place, bronze medalist(s)	80	Polina Putsko	Ukraine	20:54.1	1 (0+1)	+1:13.9
4	9	Heda Mikolášová	Czech Republic	21:05.7	5 (2+3)	+1:25.5
5	34	Ilona Plecháčová	Czech Republic	21:07.5	4 (2+2)	+1:27.3
6	37	Julie Kvelvane	Norway	21:07.6	4 (1+3)	+1:27.4
7	84	Molly Kafka	Switzerland	21:09.7	1 (1+0)	+1:29.5
8	57	Lena Baumann	Switzerland	21:16.0	3 (2+1)	+1:35.8
9	29	Nayeli Mariotti Cavagnet	Italy	21:16.3	4 (3+1)	+1:36.1
10	33	Michaela Straková	Slovakia	21:17.7	2 (1+1)	+1:37.5
11	48	Marie Keudel	Germany	21:30.5	3 (2+1)	+1:50.3
12	95	Valeriia Sheihas	Ukraine	21:32.0	2 (0+2)	+1:51.8
13	69	Ilona Rantakömi	Finland	21:35.6	1 (0+1)	+1:55.4
14	72	Hanna Beck	Germany	21:41.5	2 (1+1)	+2:01.3
15	35	Matilde Giordano	Italy	21:48.8	5 (2+3)	+2:08.6
16	60	Rosaly Stollberger	Austria	21:51.7	1 (0+1)	+2:11.5
17	21	Alice Dusserre	France	21:52.2	2 (1+1)	+2:12.0
18	71	Alžbeta Garguláková	Slovakia	22:00.6	4 (0+4)	+2:20.4
19	25	Leonora Rønhede	Denmark	22:01.9	2 (0+2)	+2:21.7
20	86	Sara Tronrud	Norway	22:02.9	3 (2+1)	+2:22.7
21	24	Eiril Nordbø	Norway	22:04.0	4 (0+4)	+2:23.8
22	82	Valerie Křížová	Czech Republic	22:08.5	5 (1+4)	+2:28.3
23	50	Iryna Shevchenko	Ukraine	22:09.8	3 (1+2)	+2:29.6
24	54	Cheyenne Tirschmann	Canada	22:19.8	2 (2+0)	+2:39.6
25	40	Eveliina Hakala	Finland	22:23.4	4 (0+4)	+2:43.2
26	90	Marie Flå	Norway	22:25.2	3 (2+1)	+2:45.0
27	23	Molly Maybach	United States	22:26.1	3 (1+2)	+2:45.9
28	89	Lena Moretti	France	22:33.9	3 (0+3)	+2:53.7
29	42	Maya Rennermalm	Sweden	22:38.7	3 (0+3)	+2:58.5
30	77	Lilly Fuchs	Austria	22:41.7	4 (2+2)	+3:01.5
31	32	Krisztina Silló	Romania	22:59.0	2 (1+1)	+3:18.8
32	97	Eva Hutter	Italy	23:03.1	4 (2+2)	+3:22.9
33	91	Lucie Jandurová	Czech Republic	23:07.9	5 (0+5)	+3:27.7
34	70	Lola Bugeaud	France	23:09.7	7 (4+3)	+3:29.5
35	45	Irina Georgieva	Bulgaria	23:13.7	3 (2+1)	+3:33.5
36	18	Ema Sobol	Croatia	23:18.4	3 (1+2)	+3:38.2
37	13	Anine Karlsson	Sweden	23:30.5	4 (2+2)	+3:50.3
38	94	Jana Duffner	Germany	23:48.6	6 (3+3)	+4:08.4
39	74	Ajda Špitalar	Slovenia	23:56.0	4 (2+2)	+4:15.8
40	79	Flora Csonka	Canada	23:56.5	5 (2+3)	+4:16.3
41	55	Amelia Liszka	Poland	23:59.0	7 (3+4)	+4:18.8
42	3	Erika Kujala	Finland	24:01.9	7 (2+5)	+4:21.7
43	39	Cristina Lanau	Spain	24:06.9	4 (2+2)	+4:26.7
44	1	Anna-Lena Wolf	Austria	24:07.1	4 (3+1)	+4:26.9
45	93	Hanni Koski	Finland	24:08.2	5 (4+1)	+4:28.0
46	83	Kätrin Kärsna	Estonia	24:11.2	4 (3+1)	+4:31.0
47	78	Kim Hye-won	South Korea	24:16.6	4 (2+2)	+4:36.4
48	20	Majka Germata	Poland	24:21.5	3 (1+2)	+4:41.3
49	2	Leni Dietersberger	Germany	24:22.1	6 (3+3)	+4:41.9
50	52	Keita Kolna	Latvia	24:22.6	3 (1+2)	+4:42.4
51	96	Marta Wernersson	Sweden	24:30.3	5 (0+5)	+4:50.1
52	92	Eliane Kiser	Switzerland	24:31.2	6 (3+3)	+4:51.0
53	56	Laureen Simberg	Estonia	24:45.3	4 (1+3)	+5:05.1
54	22	Madara Veckalniņa	Latvia	24:47.5	3 (2+1)	+5:07.3
55	64	Nikol Klenovska	Bulgaria	24:56.0	4 (2+2)	+5:15.8
56	8	Ava McCann	Australia	25:02.0	3 (0+3)	+5:21.8
57	11	Alema Karabayeva	Kazakhstan	25:04.9	5 (4+1)	+5:24.7
58	55	Nilla Norberg	Sweden	25:06.7	7 (3+4)	+5:26.5
59	26	Maëline Triponez	Switzerland	25:13.6	4 (3+1)	+5:33.4
60	49	Emilija Mincevič	Lithuania	25:15.6	3 (1+2)	+5:35.4
61	58	Alessandra Sydun-West (Note: A time adjustment of –40 seconds was assessed for a range issue.)	Australia	25:19.8	4 (1+3)	+5:39.6
62	46	Evelina Mezentseva	Kazakhstan	25:23.8	7 (4+3)	+5:43.6
63	87	Gabriela Gąsienica	Poland	25:24.8	5 (3+2)	+5:44.6
64	4	Anlourdees Veerpalu	Estonia	25:33.4	7 (4+3)	+5:53.2
65	51	Alexandria Taylor	United States	25:53.0	7 (3+4)	+6:12.8
66	98	Ilka Zleptnig	Austria	26:02.9	6 (4+2)	+6:22.7
67	14	Raya Adzhamova	Bulgaria	26:13.0	8 (4+4)	+6:32.8
68	85	Bridget Harvey	Australia	26:15.4	7 (3+4)	+6:35.2
69	75	Paula Morozan-Irinaru	Romania	26:33.8	2 (0+2)	+6:53.6
70	61	Kim Min-ji	South Korea	26:34.2	6 (4+2)	+6:54.0
71	12	Josie Clifford	Great Britain	26:57.2	7 (4+3)	+7:17.0
72	36	Hanna Braun	Serbia	27:01.6	6 (4+2)	+7:21.4
73	16	Maria Tsiarka	Greece	27:17.2	6 (1+5)	+7:37.0
74	44	Szidónia Kelemen	Romania	27:25.0	7 (5+2)	+7:44.8
75	5	Arina Rusu	Moldova	27:29.8	5 (1+4)	+7:49.6
76	65	Emily Campbell	United States	27:35.7	9 (5+4)	+7:55.5
77	81	Nyamsuren Demuul	Mongolia	28:11.1	5 (4+1)	+8:30.9
78	30	Erdenetungalag Khash-Erdene (Note: A time adjustment of +2 minutes was assessed for failing to run one penalty loop.)	Mongolia	28:16.4	6 (5+1)	+8:36.2
79	59	Louise Roguet (Note: A time adjustment of +4 minutes was assessed for failing to run two penalty loops.) (Note: A time adjustment of +2 minutes was assessed for cross-fire.)	France	28:37.5	9 (4+5)	+8:57.3
80	62	Leona Pelko	Croatia	28:54.2	5 (2+3)	+9:14.0
81	41	Laura Bozóki	Hungary	29:00.6	7 (5+2)	+9:20.4
82	7	Zülal Türk	Turkey	29:09.5	8 (3+5)	+9:29.3
83	31	Rusnė Motiejūnaitė	Lithuania	29:18.9	6 (3+3)	+9:38.7
84	47	Aikaterini Vaikou	Greece	29:23.6	7 (4+3)	+9:43.4
85	67	Lydia Tsiatsiou	Greece	32:37.8	6 (3+3)	+12:57.6
86	63	Parichat Bunmani	Thailand	32:50.4	8 (3+5)	+13:10.2
87	19	Jariyawadee Audomlap	Thailand	33:30.2	8 (5+3)	+13:50.0
88	68	Phitchapha Northong	Thailand	33:33.5	10 (5+5)	+13:53.3
89	17	Mariana Lopes da Silva	Brazil	34:37.0	6 (3+3)	+14:56.8
90	38	Oyutsolmon Oleksandrovna	Mongolia	34:58.8	6 (4+2)	+15:18.6
91	53	Veronika Šteczová (Note: A time adjustment of +10 minutes was assessed for failing to run five penalty loops.) (Note: A time adjustment of +2 minutes was assessed for cross-fire.)	Slovakia	37:33.3	8 (3+5)	+17:53.1
92	27	Lee Ju-hee (Note: A time adjustment of +10 minutes was assessed for failing to run five penalty loops.) (Note: A time adjustment of +2 minutes was assessed for cross-fire.)	South Korea	40:06.3	10 (5+5)	+20:26.1
93	15	Andrijana Kajevska	North Macedonia	40:12.9	7 (2+5)	+20:32.7
94	6	Valentina Mercado (Note: A time adjustment of +2 minutes was assessed for failing to run one penalty loop.)	Chile	40:51.5	9 (4+5)	+21:11.3
	73	Mariya Vorobyeva	Kazakhstan	Did not finish		
	10	Alina Khmil	Ukraine	Did not start		
	28	Julia Bartlett	Canada	Did not start		
	76	Austėja Pupelytė	Lithuania	Did not start		
