= Biathlon at the 2024 Winter Youth Olympics – Men's sprint =

Men's sprint at the IV Winter Youth Olympic Games
- Venue: Alpensia Biathlon Centre
- Date: 23 January 2024
- Competitors: 99 from 36 nations
- Winning time: 20:57.7

Medalists
1st place, gold medalist(s)		Antonin Guy	France
2nd place, silver medalist(s)		Tov Røysland	Norway
3rd place, bronze medalist(s)		Flavio Guy	France

The men's 7.5 km sprint biathlon competition at the 2024 Winter Youth Olympics was held on 23 January 2024 at the Alpensia Biathlon Centre.

== Results ==
The race was started at 10:30 and was finished at 11:46.

Rank	Bib	Name	Country	Time	Penalties (P+S)	Deficit
1st place, gold medalist(s)	41	Antonin Guy	France	20:57.7	1 (0+1)	
2nd place, silver medalist(s)	43	Tov Røysland	Norway	21:29.5	1 (0+1)	+31.8
3rd place, bronze medalist(s)	94	Flavio Guy	France	21:55.2	4 (3+1)	+57.5
4	80	Camille Grataloup Manissolle	France	21:59.5	2 (1+1)	+1:01.8
5	36	Georgi Dzhorgov	Bulgaria	22:10.8	1 (0+1)	+1:13.1
6	84	Michel Deval	Italy	22:12.9	0 (0+0)	+1:15.2
7	85	Matthäus Schönaigner	Austria	22:30.9	3 (1+2)	+1:33.2
8	87	Anton Modigs	Sweden	22:32.3	2 (0+2)	+1:34.6
9	10	Grzegorz Galica	Poland	22:37.1	4 (1+3)	+1:39.4
10	45	Björn Hederich	Germany	22:40.9	2 (1+1)	+1:43.2
10	74	Nikolay Nikolov	Bulgaria	22:40.9	2 (2+0)	+1:43.2
12	7	Oleksandr Bilanenko	Ukraine	22:41.9	3 (1+2)	+1:44.2
13	4	Horia Urs	Romania	22:49.8	1 (0+1)	+1:52.1
14	19	Hannes Bacher	Italy	23:00.8	6 (3+3)	+2:03.1
15	25	Storm Veitsle	Norway	23:03.3	3 (2+1)	+2:05.6
16	2	Veselin Belchinski	Bulgaria	23:09.1	2 (1+1)	+2:11.4
17	75	Anton Redkin	Kazakhstan	23:16.2	1 (1+0)	+2:18.5
18	81	Lukáš Kulhánek	Czech Republic	23:17.0	2 (1+1)	+2:19.3
19	12	Lukas Tannheimer	Germany	23:20.0	4 (2+2)	+2:22.3
20	70	Justin Konoff	Canada	23:22.4	3 (1+2)	+2:24.7
21	39	Kaapo Saarinen	Finland	23:23.7	3 (3+0)	+2:26.0
22	51	Levin Kunz	Switzerland	23:31.2	3 (1+2)	+2:33.5
23	46	Elias Soule	United States	23:33.2	5 (2+3)	+2:35.5
24	20	Filip Crnić	Croatia	23:33.8	4 (1+3)	+2:36.1
25	21	Clément Pirès	France	23:42.2	5 (2+3)	+2:44.5
26	92	Sigurd Lehn	Norway	23:42.3	5 (1+4)	+2:44.6
27	47	Jaka Pilar	Slovenia	23:42.5	2 (0+2)	+2:44.8
28	59	Cho Na-dan	South Korea	23:45.3	2 (2+0)	+2:47.6
29	98	Sebastián Belicaj	Slovakia	23:49.4	1 (1+0)	+2:51.7
30	88	Michal Adamov	Slovakia	23:54.4	5 (3+2)	+2:56.7
31	90	Finn Zurnieden	Germany	23:57.1	4 (2+2)	+2:59.4
32	23	Frederik Välbe	Estonia	23:58.9	3 (1+2)	+3:01.2
33	60	Phoenix Sparke	Australia	23:59.9	5 (4+1)	+3:02.2
34	17	Björn Niederhauser	Switzerland	24:00.1	1 (0+1)	+3:02.4
35	50	Dragoș Bărbieru	Romania	24:02.3	3 (1+2)	+3:04.6
36	64	Eemil Koskinen	Finland	24:02.7	5 (3+2)	+3:05.0
37	3	Juozas Augustinavičius	Lithuania	24:09.3	1 (1+0)	+3:11.6
38	33	John Lohuis	United States	24:11.3	1 (0+1)	+3:13.6
39	76	Pablo Baselgia	Switzerland	24:13.6	2 (1+1)	+3:15.9
40	58	Tom Smith	Great Britain	24:16.7	4 (1+3)	+3:19.0
41	14	Park Min-yong	South Korea	24:22.2	2 (1+1)	+3:24.5
42	34	Simon Grasberger	Austria	24:24.7	4 (1+3)	+3:27.0
43	57	Luke Hulshof	Canada	24:26.1	5 (2+3)	+3:28.4
44	31	Graham Benson	Great Britain	24:27.2	3 (0+3)	+3:29.5
44	42	Jan Dufek	Czech Republic	24:27.2	3 (1+2)	+3:29.5
46	63	Manuel Contoz	Italy	24:31.0	5 (3+2)	+3:33.3
47	68	Ivan Steblyna	Ukraine	24:33.1	4 (2+2)	+3:35.4
48	56	Kirill Zotov	Kazakhstan	24:33.7	3 (2+1)	+3:36.0
49	16	Adrians Šņoriņš	Latvia	24:35.4	4 (1+3)	+3:37.7
50	22	Nejc Einhauer	Slovenia	24:35.9	1 (0+1)	+3:38.2
51	35	Dmytro Kriukov	Ukraine	24:37.2	4 (2+2)	+3:39.5
52	96	Antonio Pertile	Italy	24:39.2	4 (3+1)	+3:41.5
53	77	Rodrigo Azabal	Spain	24:46.8	6 (5+1)	+3:49.1
54	48	Daniel Varikov	Estonia	24:49.9	4 (2+2)	+3:52.2
55	30	Dawson Ferguson	Canada	24:51.2	4 (3+1)	+3:53.5
56	40	Dinu Belevac	Moldova	24:51.7	1 (0+1)	+3:54.0
57	8	Akseli Kirjavainen	Finland	24:59.9	4 (1+3)	+4:02.2
58	93	Yanis Dumaz	Switzerland	25:03.8	4 (2+2)	+4:06.1
59	83	Hwang Tae-ryeong	South Korea	25:08.9	3 (2+1)	+4:11.2
60	54	Igor Kusztal	Poland	25:11.0	6 (4+2)	+4:13.3
61	29	Jakub Neuhauser	Czech Republic	25:11.5	5 (3+2)	+4:13.8
62	71	Noa Kam-Magruder	United States	25:14.6	7 (5+2)	+4:16.9
63	53	Olle Gedda	Sweden	25:15.7	7 (4+3)	+4:18.0
64	37	Valters Bresme	Latvia	25:16.6	4 (3+1)	+4:18.9
65	72	Korbinian Kübler	Germany	25:16.7	6 (4+2)	+4:19.0
66	79	Oskar Orupõld	Estonia	25:30.2	4 (2+2)	+4:32.5
67	95	Arttu Remes	Finland	25:35.2	6 (1+5)	+4:37.5
68	49	Ignas Rakštelis	Lithuania	25:38.9	2 (0+2)	+4:41.2
69	97	Magnus Steiner	Austria	25:39.1	5 (2+3)	+4:41.4
70	78	Ole Gebhardt	Norway	25:49.4	6 (4+2)	+4:51.7
71	44	Srđan Lalović	Bosnia and Herzegovina	25:49.5	3 (1+2)	+4:51.8
72	5	Simon Hechenberger	Austria	25:59.3	5 (2+3)	+5:01.6
73	86	Daniel Buchovskij	Lithuania	26:07.3	4 (2+2)	+5:09.6
74	61	Markus Sklenárik	Slovakia	26:10.9	7 (5+2)	+5:13.2
75	6	Sukhbat Borkhuu	Mongolia	26:13.6	6 (3+3)	+5:15.9
76	99	Oleksandr Holik	Ukraine	26:37.6	4 (2+2)	+5:39.9
77	13	Ilyas Khassenov	Kazakhstan	26:38.9	7 (4+3)	+5:41.2
78	66	Amarsanaa Turtogtokh	Mongolia	26:40.9	4 (1+3)	+5:43.2
79	82	Gregor Rupnik	Slovenia	26:47.0	6 (3+3)	+5:49.3
80	24	Boris Stanojević	Bosnia and Herzegovina	27:09.2	3 (0+3)	+6:11.5
81	18	Abdulkerim Hodžić	Serbia	27:20.0	5 (2+3)	+6:22.3
82	32	Thijn Omblets	Sweden	27:27.5	7 (4+3)	+6:29.8
83	28	Blagoja Najdenoski	North Macedonia	27:46.6	4 (2+2)	+6:48.9
84	73	Edward Woodhouse-Bedak	Australia	27:50.8	5 (2+3)	+6:53.1
85	9	Vasileios Rosenlis	Greece	27:51.2	7 (4+3)	+6:53.5
86	55	Ioannis Anastasiadis	Greece	28:20.9	3 (1+2)	+7:23.2
87	69	Hunor Udvari	Romania	28:23.9	5 (2+3)	+7:26.2
88	62	Temuujin Byambadorj	Mongolia	28:37.8	3 (1+2)	+7:40.1
89	15	László Kúnos	Hungary	28:46.9	5 (4+1)	+7:49.2
90	11	Vladislav Maistrov	Moldova	28:57.5	4 (1+3)	+7:59.8
91	26	Artur Saparbekov	Kyrgyzstan	29:38.6	8 (5+3)	+8:40.9
92	1	Matthew Wilby	Australia	30:02.8	3 (1+2)	+9:05.1
93	67	Antonios Prodromidis	Greece	30:33.5	5 (3+2)	+9:35.8
94	38	Matija Naglić	Croatia	30:53.8	2 (1+1)	+9:56.1
95	52	Baxter Pollard	New Zealand	32:02.3	8 (5+3)	+11:04.6
96	27	Thanakorn Ngoeichai	Thailand	33:27.9	6 (1+5)	+12:30.2
	65	Michał Szułczyński	Poland	Did not finish		
	89	Olivers Bresme	Latvia	Did not start		
	91	Arvid Trofast	Sweden	Did not start		
