= Croatia at the 2024 Winter Youth Olympics =

- Flag of Croatia
- IOC code: CRO
- NOC: Croatian Olympic Committee

in Gangwon, South Korea 19 January 2024 – 1 February 2024
- Competitors: 9 in 3 sports
- Flag bearers (opening): Ziggy Vrdoljak & Ema Sobol
- Flag bearer (closing): unknown
- Medals: Gold 0 Silver 0 Bronze 0 Total 0

Winter Youth Olympics appearances (overview)
- 2012; 2016; 2020; 2024

Croatia competed at the 2024 Winter Youth Olympics in Gangwon, South Korea, from January 19 to February 1, 2024, This was Croatia's fourth appearance at the Winter Youth Olympic Games, having competed at every Games since the inaugural edition in 2012.

The Croatian team consisted of nine athletes (five men and four women) competing in three sports. Alpine skier Ziggy Vrdoljak and biathlete Ema Sobol were the country's flagbearers during the opening ceremony.

== Competitors ==
The following is the list of number of competitors (per gender) participating at the games per sport/discipline.

Sport	Men	Women	Total
Alpine skiing	1	0	1
Biathlon	2	2	4
Cross-country skiing	2	2	4
Total	5	4	9

== Alpine skiing ==
Croatia qualified one male alpine skier.

Men

Athlete	Event	Run 1		Run 2		Total	
Athlete	Event	Time	Rank	Time	Rank	Time	Rank
Ziggy Vrdoljak	Super-G	—N/a				56.27	29
Ziggy Vrdoljak	Giant slalom	51.86	30	46.97	17	1:38.83	21
Ziggy Vrdoljak	Slalom	48.65	20	53.97	13	1:42.62	12
Ziggy Vrdoljak	Combined	56.61	30	Did not finish			

== Biathlon ==
Men

Athlete	Event	Time	Misses	Rank
Filip Crnić	Sprint	23:33.8	4 (1+3)	24
Filip Crnić	Individual	45:34.9	6 (1+1+1+3)	18
Matija Naglić	Sprint	30:53.8	2 (1+1)	94
Matija Naglić	Individual	56:46.1	7 (1+4+1+1)	91

Women

Athlete	Event	Time	Misses	Rank
Leona Pelko	Sprint	28:54.2	5 (2+3)	80
Leona Pelko	Individual	53:30.8	7 (0+2+1+4)	87
Ema Sobol	Sprint	23:18.4	3 (1+2)	36
Ema Sobol	Individual	46:30.5	8 (2+2+2+2)	65

Mixed

Athletes	Event	Time	Misses	Rank
Filip Crnić; Ema Sobol	Single mixed relay	49:33.6	3+16	17
Ema Sobol; Leona Pelko; Filip Crnić; Matija Naglić	Mixed relay	Lapped		

== Cross-country skiing ==
Croatia qualified four cross-country skiers (two per gender).

Men

Athlete	Event	Qualification		Quarterfinal		Semifinal		Final	
Athlete	Event	Time	Rank	Time	Rank	Time	Rank	Time	Rank
Boris Štefančić	7.5 km classical	—N/a						24:59.3	63
Boris Štefančić	Sprint freestyle	3:37.31	63	Did not advance					
Matija Štimac	7.5 km classical	—N/a						24:13.8	56
Matija Štimac	Sprint freestyle	3:28.56	54	Did not advance					

Women

Athlete	Event	Qualification		Quarterfinal		Semifinal		Final	
Athlete	Event	Time	Rank	Time	Rank	Time	Rank	Time	Rank
Nives Baričevac	7.5 km classical	—N/a						29:51.4	60
Nives Baričevac	Sprint freestyle	4:29.37	63	Did not advance					
Chiara Gašparac	7.5 km classical	—N/a						28:21.5	55
Chiara Gašparac	Sprint freestyle	4:11.54	52	Did not advance					

Mixed

Athlete	Event	Time	Rank
Chiara Gašparac; Matija Štimac; Nives Barićevac; Boris Štefančić	Mixed relay	1:03:59.8	21

== See also ==
- Croatia at the 2024 Summer Olympics
