= Alpine skiing at the 2024 Winter Youth Olympics – Women's giant slalom =

Women's giant slalom at the IV Winter Youth Olympic Games
- Venue: High1 Resort, South Korea
- Date: 23 January 2024
- Competitors: 79 from 58 nations
- Winning time: 1:41.10

Medalists
1st place, gold medalist(s)		Giorgia Collomb	Italy
2nd place, silver medalist(s)		Shaienne Zehnder	Switzerland
3rd place, bronze medalist(s)		Astrid Hedin	Sweden

The women's Giant slalom competition of the 2024 Winter Youth Olympics was held at the High1 Resort, Jeongseon, South Korea, on Tuesday, 23 January 2024.

== Results ==
The first run was started at 10:30 and the slalom was started at 13:15.

Rank	Bib	Name	Country	Run 1	Rank	Run 2	Rank	Total	Diff
1st place, gold medalist(s)	1	Giorgia Collomb	Italy	48.42	1	52.68	2	1:41.10	
2nd place, silver medalist(s)	12	Shaienne Zehnder	Switzerland	48.56	2	52.65	1	1:41.21	+0.11
3rd place, bronze medalist(s)	9	Astrid Hedin	Sweden	49.40	8	52.73	3	1:42.13	+1.03
4	14	Justine Herzog	Switzerland	49.14	6	53.29	6	1:42.43	+1.33
5	15	Alexandra Skorokhodova	Kazakhstan	49.71	9	52.80	4	1:42.51	+1.41
6	19	Rita Granruaz	Italy	49.05	5	53.58	8	1:42.63	+1.53
7	30	Amelie Björksten	Finland	49.88	12	52.91	5	1:42.79	+1.69
8	3	Romy Ertl	Germany	48.99	4	53.86	9	1:42.85	+1.75
9	13	Fabienne Wenger	Switzerland	49.27	7	54.39	15	1:43.66	+2.56
10	26	Molly Butler	Great Britain	49.78	11	54.24	14	1:44.02	+2.92
11	4	Aida Draghia	Canada	49.71	9	54.50	16	1:44.21	+3.11
12	15	Louise Lundquist	Sweden	50.32	15	53.96	10	1:44.28	+3.18
13	18	Annika Hunt	United States	51.30	20	53.37	7	1:44.67	+3.57
14	24	Sara Testut-G'Styr	France	50.53	17	54.18	12	1:44.71	+3.61
15	38	Veronika Šrobová	Slovakia	50.75	18	54.18	12	1:44.93	+3.83
16	31	Elsa Feliciello	Canada	51.15	19	54.12	11	1:45.27	+4.17
17	43	María Abad	Spain	51.73	22	54.58	17	1:46.31	+5.21
18	32	Matilde Pinilla	Chile	52.01	23	55.49	18	1:47.50	+6.40
19	27	Florencia Aramburo	Chile	52.18	24	56.23	22	1:48.41	+7.31
20	36	Ana Merc	Slovenia	52.53	25	56.10	21	1:48.63	+7.53
21	46	Lee Na-yae	South Korea	53.23	26	56.09	20	1:49.32	+8.22
22	54	Hanna Gret Teder	Estonia	53.99	28	55.88	19	1:49.87	+8.77
23	44	Ruby Fullerton	New Zealand	53.25	27	56.76	24	1:50.01	+8.91
24	49	Dóra Körtvélyessy	Hungary	54.20	30	56.29	23	1:50.49	+9.39
25	52	Ioana Corlățeanu	Romania	54.02	29	56.85	25	1:50.87	+9.77
26	57	Eabha McKenna	Ireland	54.42	32	57.61	26	1:52.03	+10.93
27	61	Frida Saḷņikova	Latvia	54.60	34	57.82	27	1:52.42	+11.32
28	47	Milla Anwandter	Argentina	54.51	33	58.42	28	1:52.93	+11.83
29	56	Þórdís Helga Grétarsdóttir	Iceland	54.29	31	59.62	31	1:53.91	+12.81
30	62	Ina Likić	Bosnia and Herzegovina	55.14	35	58.79	29	1:53.93	+12.83
31	58	Lirika Deva	Kosovo	56.08	38	58.79	29	1:54.87	+13.77
32	59	Chung Seung-yeon	South Korea	56.66	40	1:01.12	32	1:57.78	+16.68
33	79	Ada Hasırcı	Turkey	56.60	39	1:01.21	33	1:57.81	+16.71
34	69	Sabina Rejepova	Uzbekistan	58.84	41	1:01.54	34	2:00.38	+19.28
35	65	Zhang Guiyuan	China	1:00.46	44	1:03.55	35	2:04.01	+22.91
36	63	Wang Ning	China	1:00.21	43	1:04.50	36	2:04.71	+23.61
37	71	Kiana Sakkal	Lebanon	1:00.69	46	1:04.58	37	2:05.27	+24.17
38	77	Sarina Ahmadpour	Iran	1:02.47	49	1:05.49	38	2:07.96	+26.86
39	78	Henniyah Rivers	Jamaica	1:01.86	48	1:07.02	39	2:08.88	+27.78
40	73	Anastasija Vukasović	Montenegro	1:03.30	50	1:07.54	40	2:10.84	+29.74
41	74	Phichayaporn Thipsekorn	Thailand	1:16.16	52	1:18.71	41	2:34.87	+53.77
42	75	Khaliun Khuderchuluun	Mongolia	1:15.92	51	1:20.31	42	2:36.23	+55.13
43	76	Laxmi Rai	Nepal	1:32.34	53	1:42.40	43	3:14.74	+1:33.64
	2	Mikoto Onishi	Japan	50.14	13	Did not finish			
	11	Camilla Vanni	Italy	48.88	3	Did not finish			
	23	Eva Schachner	Austria	50.39	16	Did not finish			
	25	Lola Blanc	France	50.17	14	Did not finish			
	28	Kia Suni	Finland	51.53	21	Did not finish			
	48	Vanesa Vulganová	Slovakia	55.83	36	Did not finish			
	64	Aerin Alexandra King	Hong Kong	1:00.92	47	Did not finish			
	70	Nahia Vieira da Fonte	Portugal	59.15	42	Did not finish			
	72	Theopisti Georgiadou	Greece	1:00.59	45	Did not finish			
	1	Jázmin Fernández	Argentina	55.96	37	Disqualified			
	5	Lina Gustafsson	Sweden	Did not finish					
	6	Charlotte Grandinger	Germany	Did not finish					
	7	Maja Waroschitz	Austria	Did not finish					
	8	Leontine Curdy	France	Did not finish					
	10	Antonia Reischl	Germany	Did not finish					
	17	Lana Hillbrand	Austria	Did not finish					
	21	Nicole Begue	United States	Did not finish					
	22	Lara Makrthaler	South Africa	Did not finish					
	29	Hinata Fukasawa	Japan	Did not finish					
	33	Ana Bokal	Slovenia	Did not finish					
	34	Katrin Kudělásková	Czech Republic	Did not finish					
	35	Nikola Komorowska	Poland	Did not finish					
	37	Aada Marttila	Finland	Did not finish					
	39	Arkie Lennon	Australia	Did not finish					
	40	Elena Drápalová	Czech Republic	Did not finish					
	41	Mia Chorogwická	Slovakia	Did not finish					
	45	Lana Pušnik	Slovenia	Did not finish					
	50	Charlotte Wiggins	New Zealand	Did not finish					
	51	Emma Tammemägi	Estonia	Did not finish					
	53	Eyrún Erla Gestsdóttir	Iceland	Did not finish					
	60	Alice Padilha	Brazil	Did not finish					
	66	Mariia Sorokmaniuk	Ukraine	Did not finish					
	67	Andrea Loizidou	Cyprus	Did not finish					
	68	Albina Ivanova	Kyrgyzstan	Did not finish					
	20	Christina Winchell	United States	Disqualified					
	55	Choi Ye-rin	South Korea	Disqualified					
