= Alpine skiing at the 2024 Winter Youth Olympics – Women's slalom =

Women's slalom at the IV Winter Youth Olympic Games
- Venue: High1 Resort, South Korea
- Date: 25 January 2024
- Competitors: 78 from 48 nations
- Winning time: 1:37.49

Medalists
1st place, gold medalist(s)		Maja Waroschitz	Austria
2nd place, silver medalist(s)		Charlotte Grandinger	Germany
3rd place, bronze medalist(s)		Giorgia Collomb	Italy

The women's Slalom competition of the 2024 Winter Youth Olympics was held at the High1 Resort, Jeongseon, South Korea, on Thursday, 25 January 2024.

== Results ==
The first run was started at 9:30 and the second run was started at 13:45.

Rank	Bib	Name	Country	Run 1	Rank	Run 2	Rank	Total	Diff
1st place, gold medalist(s)	7	Maja Waroschitz	Austria	49.35	1	48.14	2	1:37.49	
2nd place, silver medalist(s)	3	Charlotte Grandinger	Germany	50.14	4	47.94	1	1:38.08	+0.59
3rd place, bronze medalist(s)	6	Giorgia Collomb	Italy	49.89	3	48.57	4	1:38.46	+0.97
4	1	Louise Lundquist	Sweden	50.67	6	48.90	5	1:39.57	+2.08
5	17	Fabienne Wenger	Switzerland	50.89	9	49.05	6	1:39.94	+2.45
6	4	Lina Gustafsson	Sweden	50.92	10	49.13	9	1:40.05	+2.56
7	9	Justine Herzog	Switzerland	51.77	14	48.29	3	1:40.06	+2.57
8	11	Shaienne Zehnder	Switzerland	51.08	11	49.17	11	1:40.25	+2.76
9	15	Alexandra Skorokhodova	Kazakhstan	50.84	8	49.50	14	1:40.34	+2.85
10	14	Aida Draghia	Canada	51.24	13	49.32	12	1:40.56	+3.07
11	20	Amelie Björksten	Finland	52.08	16	49.11	8	1:41.19	+3.70
12	16	Molly Butler	Great Britain	52.36	19	49.14	10	1:41.50	+4.01
13	24	Rita Granruaz	Italy	52.17	17	49.34	13	1:41.51	+4.02
14	19	Elsa Feliciello	Canada	51.18	12	50.45	20	1:41.63	+4.14
15	33	María Abad	Spain	52.88	23	49.09	7	1:41.97	+4.48
16	5	Antonia Reischl	Germany	51.90	15	50.09	18	1:41.99	+4.50
17	18	Sara Testut-G'Styr	France	52.48	20	49.65	16	1:42.13	+4.64
18	39	Eva Schachner	Austria	53.27	25	49.50	14	1:42.77	+5.28
19	28	Nikola Komorowska	Poland	52.72	22	50.46	21	1:43.18	+5.69
20	22	Lola Blanc	France	53.00	24	50.30	19	1:43.30	+5.81
21	32	Katrin Kudělásková	Czech Republic	54.34	29	49.79	17	1:44.13	+6.64
22	30	Ana Merc	Slovenia	53.67	27	50.83	22	1:44.50	+7.01
23	41	Dóra Körtvélyessy	Hungary	54.80	31	53.03	23	1:47.83	+10.34
24	48	Frida Saḷņikova	Latvia	55.09	33	53.39	24	1:48.48	+10.99
25	21	Christina Winchell	United States	55.22	34	53.47	25	1:48.69	+11.20
26	47	Choi Ye-rin	South Korea	55.47	35	53.66	26	1:49.13	+11.64
27	45	Lirika Deva	Kosovo	56.14	38	54.01	28	1:50.15	+12.66
28	55	Ioana Corlățeanu	Romania	56.36	41	53.82	27	1:50.18	+12.69
29	51	Milla Anwandter	Argentina	56.18	39	54.17	29	1:50.35	+12.86
30	43	Charlotte Wiggins	New Zealand	55.65	37	54.82	31	1:50.47	+12.98
31	38	Eyrún Erla Gestsdóttir	Iceland	57.45	43	54.17	29	1:51.62	+14.13
32	57	Hanna Gret Teder	Estonia	56.33	40	55.99	34	1:52.32	+14.83
33	54	Eabha McKenna	Ireland	57.92	46	55.29	32	1:53.21	+15.72
34	50	Lee Na-yae	South Korea	57.78	45	55.52	33	1:53.30	+15.81
35	59	Andrea Loizidou	Cyprus	1:01.36	50	58.56	35	1:59.92	+22.43
36	71	Sabine Rejepova	Uzbekistan	1:02.48	51	1:00.26	37	2:02.74	+25.25
37	65	Zhang Guiyuan	China	1:03.10	52	1:00.31	38	2:03.41	+25.92
38	61	Chung Seung-yeon	South Korea	1:05.21	54	1:00.24	36	2:05.45	+27.96
39	68	Wang Ning	China	1:04.46	53	1:01.49	39	2:05.95	+28.46
40	70	Theopisti Georgiadou	Greece	1:05.96	55	1:01.89	40	2:07.85	+30.36
41	69	Albina Ivanova	Kyrgyzstan	1:06.86	56	1:02.83	41	2:09.69	+32.20
42	73	Aerin Alexandra King	Hong Kong	1:08.38	58	1:03.67	42	2:12.05	+34.56
43	76	Khaliun Khuderchuluun	Mongolia	1:31.15	60	1:19.45	43	2:50.60	+1:13.11
44	77	Phichayaporn Thipkesorn	Thailand	1:29.25	59	1:25.04	44	2:54.29	+1:16.80
	2	Astrid Hedin	Sweden	49.69	2	Did not finish			
	8	Annika Hunt	United States	50.83	7	Did not finish			
	10	Romy Ertl	Germany	50.46	5	Did not finish			
	26	Camilla Vanni	Italy	52.20	18	Did not finish			
	27	Nicole Begue	Slovakia	52.52	21	Did not finish			
	29	Kia Suni	Finland	53.83	28	Did not finish			
	31	Veronika Šrobová	Slovakia	53.66	26	Did not finish			
	37	Leontine Curdy	France	54.56	30	Did not finish			
	42	Florencia Aramburo	Chile	55.53	36	Did not finish			
	52	Jázmin Fernández	Argentina	56.89	42	Did not finish			
	53	Arkie Lennon	Australia	55.01	32	Did not finish			
	56	Þórdís Helga Grétarsdóttir	Iceland	57.65	44	Did not finish			
	63	Nahia Vieira da Fonte	Portugal	1:00.73	48	Did not finish			
	66	Mariia Sorokmaniuk	Ukraine	1:00.85	49	Did not finish			
	67	Kiana Sakkal	Lebanon	1:07.14	57	Did not finish			
	49	Ruby Fullerton	New Zealand	58.95	47	Did not start			
	12	Mikoto Onishi	Japan	Did not finish					
	13	Hinata Fukasawa	Japan	Did not finish					
	23	Lana Hillbrand	Austria	Did not finish					
	25	Elena Drápalová	Czech Republic	Did not finish					
	34	Lara Markthaler	South Africa	Did not finish					
	35	Matilde Pinilla	Chile	Did not finish					
	36	Aada Marttila	Finland	Did not finish					
	40	Lana Pušnik	Slovenia	Did not finish					
	44	Ana Bokal	Slovenia	Did not finish					
	46	Mia Chorogwická	Slovakia	Did not finish					
	58	Ada Hasırcı	Turkey	Did not finish					
	60	Alice Padilha	Brazil	Did not finish					
	62	Ina Likić	Bosnia and Herzegovina	Did not finish					
	64	Vanesa Vulganová	Slovakia	Did not finish					
	72	Henniyah Rivers	Jamaica	Did not finish					
	74	Anastasija Vukasović	Montenegro	Did not finish					
	75	Sarina Ahmadpour	Iran	Did not finish					
	78	Laxmi Rai	Nepal	Did not finish					
