= Slovakia at the 2024 Winter Youth Olympics =

- Flag of Slovakia
- IOC code: SVK
- NOC: Slovak Olympic Committee

in Gangwon, South Korea 19 January 2024 – 1 February 2024
- Competitors: 49 in 12 sports
- Flag bearers (opening): Michal Adamov & Tamara Mesíková
- Flag bearers (closing): Dominik Barčák & Emília Rendová
- Medals Ranked 25th: Gold 0 Silver 1 Bronze 2 Total 3

Winter Youth Olympics appearances (overview)
- 2012; 2016; 2020; 2024

Slovakia is scheduled to compete at the 2024 Winter Youth Olympics in Gangwon, South Korea, from January 19 to February 1, 2024. This will be Slovakia's fourth appearance at the Winter Youth Olympic Games, having competed at every Games since the inaugural edition in 2012.

Biathlete and cross-country skier Michal Adamov and ski jumper Tamara Mesíková were the country's flagbearers during the opening ceremony.

== Medalists ==
Medal	Name	Sport	Event	Date
Silver	Adam Hagara	Figure skating	Men's singles	29 January
Bronze	Markus Sklenárik	Biathlon	Men's individual	20 January
Bronze	Andrej Barnáš	Alpine skiing	Men's super-G	21 January

== Competitors ==
The following is the list of number of competitors (per gender) participating at the games per sport/discipline.

Sport	Men	Women	Total
Alpine skiing	2	3	5
Biathlon	3	3	6
Cross-country skiing	2	2	4
Figure skating	1	0	1
Freestyle skiing	1	1	2
Ice hockey	18	0	18
Luge	3	2	5
Nordic combined	2	0	2
Short track speed skating	0	2	2
Skeleton	1	0	1
Ski jumping	2	1	3
Snowboarding	2	1	3
Total	34 (Note: Hektor Kapustík and Jakub Karkalík participates in both Nordic combined and ski jumping. Michal Adamov participates in both cross-country skiing and biathlon.)	15	49

== Alpine skiing ==
Slovakia qualified five alpine skiers (two men and three women).

Men

Athlete	Event	Run 1		Run 2		Total	
Athlete	Event	Time	Rank	Time	Rank	Time	Rank
Andrej Barnáš	Super-G	—N/a				54.78	3rd place, bronze medalist(s)
Andrej Barnáš	Combined	55.76	17	54.64	3	1:50.40	5
Andrej Barnáš	Giant slalom	50.29	12	46.42	10	1:36.71	6
Andrej Barnáš	Slalom	48.59	17	DNF			
Daniel Palič	Super-G	—N/a				DNF	
Daniel Palič	Combined	56.03	23	56.88	20	1:52.91	22
Daniel Palič	Giant slalom	52.53	37	48.55	29	1:41.08	27
Daniel Palič	Slalom	DNF					

Women

Athlete	Event	Run 1		Run 2		Total	
Athlete	Event	Time	Rank	Time	Rank	Time	Rank
Veronika Šrobová	Super-G	—N/a				55.38	16
Veronika Šrobová	Combined	58.27	20	52.47	6	1:50.74	13
Veronika Šrobová	Giant slalom	50.75	18	54.18	12	1:44.93	15
Veronika Šrobová	Slalom	53.66	26	DNF			
Mia Chorogwická	Super-G	—N/a				DNF	
Mia Chorogwická	Combined	1:00.38	40	DNF			
Mia Chorogwická	Giant slalom	DNF					
Mia Chorogwická	Slalom	DNF					
Vanesa Vulganová	Super-G	—N/a				DNF	
Vanesa Vulganová	Combined	59.38	34	DNF			
Vanesa Vulganová	Giant slalom	55.83	36	DNF			
Vanesa Vulganová	Slalom	DNF					

Mixed

Athlete	Event	Round of 16	Quarterfinal	Semifinal	Final / BM	
Athlete	Event	Opposition Result	Opposition Result	Opposition Result	Opposition Result	Rank
Veronika Šrobová; Andrej Barnáš	Parallel mixed team	United States; L 1–3	Did not advance			

== Biathlon ==
Men's

Athlete	Event	Time	Misses	Rank
Sebastián Belicaj	Individual	46:37.2	4 (0+3+1+0)	27
Sebastián Belicaj	Sprint	23:49.4	1 (1+0)	29
Michal Adamov	Individual	44:13.6	6 (0+3+0+3)	10
Michal Adamov	Sprint	23:54.4	5 (3+2)	30
Markus Sklenárik	Individual	43:01.5	1 (1+0+0+0)	3rd place, bronze medalist(s)
Markus Sklenárik	Sprint	26:10.9	7 (5+2)	74

Women's

Athlete	Event	Time	Misses	Rank
Michaela Straková	Sprint	21:17.7	2 (1+1)	10
Michaela Straková	Individual	43:26.9	7 (2+0+4+1)	35
Alžbeta Garguľáková	Sprint	22:00.6	4 (0+4)	18
Alžbeta Garguľáková	Individual	41:59.6	7 (2+1+1+3)	22
Veronika Steczová	Sprint	37:33.3	8 (3+5)	91
Veronika Steczová	Individual	42:58.8	1 (0+0+0+1)	30

Mixed

Athlete	Event	Time	Misses	Rank
Markus Sklenárik; Alžbeta Garguláková	Single mixed relay	53:42.0	5+12	27
Michaela Straková; Alžbeta Garguláková; Markus Sklenárik; Markus Sklenárik	Mixed relay	DSQ		

== Cross-country skiing ==
Slovakia qualified four cross-country skiers (two per gender).

Men

Athlete	Event	Qualification		Quarterfinal		Semifinal		Final	
Athlete	Event	Time	Rank	Time	Rank	Time	Rank	Time	Rank
Jelisej Kuzmin	7.5 km classical	—N/a						21:36.4	34
Jelisej Kuzmin	Sprint freestyle	3:21.93	42	Did not advanced					
Michal Adamov	7.5 km classical	—N/a						21:08.2	27
Michal Adamov	Sprint freestyle	3:11.71	24 Q	3:09.71	4	Did not advanced			

Women

Athlete	Event	Qualification		Quarterfinal		Semifinal		Final	
Athlete	Event	Time	Rank	Time	Rank	Time	Rank	Time	Rank
Emília Rendová	7.5 km classical	—N/a						24:53.7	32
Emília Rendová	Sprint freestyle	3:40.18	17 Q	4:04.19	6	Did not advanced			
Tereza Bukasová	7.5 km classical	—N/a						25:08.3	35
Tereza Bukasová	Sprint freestyle	3:54.33	39	Did not advanced					

Mixed

Athlete	Event	Time	Rank
Emília Rendová; Jelisej Kuzmin; Tereza Bukasová; Michal Adamov	Mixed relay	57:18.7	13

== Figure skating ==
Singles

Athlete	Event	SP		FS		Total	
Athlete	Event	Points	Rank	Points	Rank	Points	Rank
Adam Hagara	Men's singles	75.06	2	141.17	3	216.23	2nd place, silver medalist(s)

== Freestyle skiing ==
Ski cross

Athlete	Event	Group heats		Semifinal	Final
Athlete	Event	Points	Rank	Position	Position
Hugo Rybár	Men's ski cross	9	13	Did not advance	
Sofia Moricová	Women's ski cross	10	11	Did not advance	

Athlete	Event	Pre-heats	Quarterfinal	Semifinal	Final
Athlete	Event	Position	Position	Position	Position
Hugo Rybár; Sofia Moricová	Team ski cross	20	Did not advance		

== Ice hockey ==
Slovakia qualified a men's hockey team of 18 athletes.

Roster

- Michal Plančár
- Matej Bereš
- Roderik Černák
- Marko Požgay
- Timur Trebula
- Matej Stankoven
- Ivan Matta
- Kristián Rezničák
- Dávid Dvořák
- Juraj Jonas Ďurčo
- Adam Goljer
- Samuel Hrenák
- Filip Kovalčík
- Jakub Syrný
- Juraj Rausa
- Dominik Barčák
- Alexej Kubát
- Kristián Macák

Summary

Key:

- OT – Overtime
- GWS – Game winning shots

Team	Event	Group stage			Semifinal	Final	
Team	Event	Opposition Score	Opposition Score	Rank	Opposition Score	Opposition Score	Rank
Slovakia	Men's tournament	United States; L 4-5	Czech Republic; L 2-3	3	Did not advance		5

=== Men's tournament ===
Group A

Pos	Team	Pld	W	SOW	SOL	L	GF	GA	GD	Pts	Qualification
1	Czech Republic	2	1	1	0	0	9	7	+2	5	Semifinals
2	United States	2	0	1	1	0	10	10	0	3	Semifinals
3	Slovakia	2	0	0	1	1	6	8	−2	1	

Source: Gangwon 2024

27 January 2024; 14:00	Slovakia	4–5 GWS (1–1, 3–1, 0–2) (SO: 0–1)	United States	Gangneung Hockey Centre; Attendance: 4,056

Game reference

Samuel Hrenák
Goalies
Xavier Wendt
Referees:
(Denmark) Rasmus Ankersen
(United Kingdom) Joseph Sewell
Linesmen:
(Canada) Mitchell Gibbs
(South Korea) Lim Jun-seo

	0–1	01:37 – Torre (Schairer, Garcia)
Syrný (Kubat) – 11:36	1–1
	1–2	18:43 – Hurlbert (Francisco, Berchild) (PP)
Ďurčo (Rausa, Goljer) (PP) – 22:10	2–2
Rezničák – 24:15	3–2
Rezničák (Stankoven) – 29:14	4–2
	4–3	36:57 – Bumgarner (Stuart, Marthaler)
	4–4	44:06 – Torre (Trottier, Berchild) (PP, EA)

Ďurčo (miss)
Goljer (miss)
Shootout
(miss) Hurlbert
Berchild
Francisco
7.5 min
Penalties
4.5 min
20
Shots
39

28 January 2024; 14:00	Czech Republic	3–2 (0–0, 0–0, 3–2)	Slovakia	Gangneung Hockey Centre; Attendance: 3,830

Game reference

Jan Láryš
Goalies
Dávid Dvořák
Referees:
(Canada) Mathieu Boudreau
(Norway) Oskar Øvstedal
Linesmen:
(Canada) Mitchell Gibbs
(Uzbekistan) David Prokofyev

	0–1	33:09 – Kubat (Plančár)
Katolický (Kachlíř, Novák) (PP) – 36:08	1–1
Katolický (Novák) – 37:06	2–1
Tomek (ENG) – 44:17	3–1
	3–2	44:34 – Kovalčík (Macák)

4.5 min
Penalties
4.5 min
36
Shots
24

== Luge ==
Individual sleds

Athlete	Event	Run 1		Run 2		Total	
Athlete	Event	Time	Rank	Time	Rank	Time	Rank
Bruno Mick	Men's singles	47.376	7	47.309	9	1:34.685	7
Viktória Praxová	Women's singles	50.757	26	51.837	28	1:42.594	25
Desana Špitzová	Women's singles	52.008	29	51.207	26	1:43.215	29
Bruno Mick; Viktor Varga	Men's doubles	48.862	6	48.860	5	1:37.722	6

Mixed team relay

Athletes	Event	Women's singles		Men's singles		Doubles		Total	
Athletes	Event	Time	Rank	Time	Rank	Time	Rank	Time	Rank
Viktória Praxová; Oliver Korbela; Bruno Mick; Viktor Varga	Team relay	50.667	7	51.462	8	51.917	4	2:34.046	7

== Nordic combined ==
Individual

Athlete	Event	Ski jumping				Cross-country	
Athlete	Event	Distance	Points	Rank	Deficit	Time	Rank
Jakub Karkalík	Men's normal hill/6 km	84.0	81.4	25	+3:58	18:41.0	27
Hektor Kapustík	Men's normal hill/6 km	109.0	134.1	2	+0:28	15:25.4	11

== Short track speed skating ==
Women

Athlete	Event	Heats		Quarterfinal		Semifinal		Final	
Athlete	Event	Time	Rank	Time	Rank	Time	Rank	Time	Rank
Michaela Ižarová	500 m	1:07.347	4	did not advance					
Michaela Ižarová	1000 m	1:39.144	3	did not advance					
Michaela Ižarová	1500 m	—N/a		2:42.115	4	did not advance			
Lea Popovičová	500 m	45.839	3 q	46.220	5	did not advance			
Lea Popovičová	1000 m	1:37.907	3 q	1:36.441	5	did not advance			
Lea Popovičová	1500 m	—N/a		2:42.482	3 Q	2:33.281	5	did not advance	

== Skeleton ==
Individual sleds

Athlete	Event	Run 1		Run 2		Total	
Athlete	Event	Time	Rank	Time	Rank	Time	Rank
Peter Jedinák	Men's	54.60	10	56.44	14	1:51.04	13

== Ski jumping ==
Slovakia qualified three ski jumpers (two men and one woman).

Individual

Athlete	Event	First round			Final			Total	
Athlete	Event	Distance	Points	Rank	Distance	Points	Rank	Points	Rank
Hektor Kapustík	Men's normal hill	82.5	63.7	29	93.5	85.1	14	148.8	19
Jakub Karkalík	Men's normal hill	69.5	35.0	37	60.0	8.4	39	43.4	39
Tamara Mesíková	Women's normal hill	77.0	50.5	20	90.0	76.0	12	126.5	18

== Snowboarding ==
Snowboard cross

Athlete	Event	Pre-Heats	Quarterfinals	Semifinal	Final
Athlete	Event	Position	Position	Position	Position
Oliver Šebesta	Men's snowboard cross	20	did not advance		
Dorota Pitoňáková	Women's snowboard cross	15	did not advance		

Halfpipe, Slopestyle & Big Air

Athlete	Event	Qualification				Final				
Athlete	Event	Run 1	Run 2	Best	Rank	Run 1	Run 2	Run 3	Best	Rank
Tadeáš Nedielka	Men's big air	55.50	70.25	70.25	10 Q	20.00	73.25	47.50	120.75	5
Tadeáš Nedielka	Men's slopestyle	19.25	32.75	32.75	15	did not advance				

== See also ==
- Slovakia at the 2024 Summer Olympics
