= Alpine skiing at the 2024 Winter Youth Olympics – Men's super-G =

Men's super-G at the IV Winter Youth Olympic Games
- Venue: High1 Resort, South Korea
- Date: 21 January 2024
- Competitors: 65 from 46 nations
- Winning time: 54.42

Medalists
1st place, gold medalist(s)		Benno Brandis	Germany
2nd place, silver medalist(s)		Asaja Sturm	Austria
3rd place, bronze medalist(s)		Andrej Barnáš	Slovakia

The men's Super-G competition of the 2024 Winter Youth Olympics was held at the High1 Resort, Jeongseon, South Korea, on Sunday, 21 January 2024.

== Results ==
The race was started at 14:00.

Rank	Bib	Name	Country	Time	Difference
1st place, gold medalist(s)	14	Benno Brandis	Germany	54.42	
2nd place, silver medalist(s)	4	Asaja Sturm	Austria	54.43	+0.01
3rd place, bronze medalist(s)	8	Andrej Barnáš	Slovakia	54.78	+0.36
4	20	Florian Neumayer	Austria	54.87	+0.45
5	16	Liam Liljenborg	Sweden	54.88	+0.46
6	10	Nicolás Quintero	Argentina	54.98	+0.56
7	15	Elliot Westlund	Sweden	54.99	+0.57
8	19	Robert Clarke	Switzerland	55.12	+0.70
9	27	Thomas Carnahan	Canada	55.14	+0.72
10	25	Stewart Bruce	United States	55.17	+0.75
11	3	Romeo Rogue	France	55.20	+0.78
12	21	Jonas Feichter	Italy	55.21	+0.79
13	26	Hemi Meikle	New Zealand	55.23	+0.81
14	33	Zak Carrick-Smith	Great Britain	55.36	+0.94
14	17	Leo Scherer	Germany	55.36	+0.94
16	61	Alexander Ax Swartz	Sweden	55.41	+0.99
17	13	Leon Hafner	Austria	55.43	+1.01
18	29	Edoardo Simonelli	Italy	55.57	+1.15
19	28	Romain Monney	Switzerland	55.71	+1.29
20	18	Yanis Häusermann	Switzerland	55.86	+1.44
21	32	Altti Pyrrö	Finland	55.90	+1.48
22	23	Zacchaeus Poulsen	France	55.95	+1.53
23	9	Lars Horvath	Germany	56.03	+1.61
24	45	Pietro Scesa	Italy	56.09	+1.67
25	24	Jaka Škrjanc	Slovenia	56.15	+1.73
26	5	Urho Rechardt	Finland	56.19	+1.77
27	51	Neo Kamada	Japan	56.20	+1.78
28	2	Noah Gianesini	Liechtenstein	56.25	+1.83
29	34	Ziggy Vrdoljak	Croatia	56.27	+1.85
30	1	Salvador Cornella Guitart	Andorra	56.58	+2.16
31	52	Noah Miljković	Bosnia and Herzegovina	56.59	+2.17
32	35	Emeric Guerrillot	Portugal	56.79	+2.37
33	11	Nash Huot-Marchand	France	57.07	+2.65
34	7	Miha Oserban	Slovenia	57.11	+2.69
35	64	Milan Schneider	Hungary	57.20	+2.78
36	36	Finlay Wilson	Ireland	57.21	+2.79
37	59	Kim Se-hyun	South Korea	57.35	+2.93
38	41	Apostolos Vougioukas	Greece	57.43	+3.01
39	53	Markus Mesila	Estonia	57.55	+3.13
40	50	Kim Joo-hyoun	South Korea	58.21	+3.79
41	42	Issa Laborde Dit Pere	Kenya	58.35	+3.93
42	60	Hugo Leonelli	Monaco	58.79	+4.37
43	40	Luca Poberai	Lithuania	59.12	+4.70
44	38	Oleksandr Patsahan	Ukraine	59.41	+4.99
45	43	Rostislav Khokhlov	Kazakhstan	59.54	+5.12
46	39	Timur Shakirov	Kyrgyzstan	59.67	+5.25
47	54	Rauan Raimkulov	Uzbekistan	1:00.24	+5.82
48	62	Pauls Pēteris Pracans	Latvia	1:00.52	+6.10
49	44	Wang Shuai	China	1:03.55	+9.13
	6	Daniel Palič	Slovakia	Did not finish	
	12	Jevin Palmquist	United States	Did not finish	
	30	Gal Hajdinjak	Slovenia	Did not finish	
	31	Stanisław Sarzyński	Poland	Did not finish	
	65	Lee Hyun-ho	South Korea	Did not finish	
	22	Stanislav Kovář	Czech Republic	Did not start	
	37	Atanas Petrov	Bulgaria	Did not start	
	46	Thomas Kaan Onol Lang	Turkey	Did not start	
	47	Henri Rivers IV	Jamaica	Did not start	
	48	Branislav Peković	Montenegro	Did not start	
	49	Manlaijav Myangaibaatar	Mongolia	Did not start	
	55	Hakob Hakobyan	Armenia	Did not start	
	56	Alexandre El Hayek	Lebanon	Did not start	
	57	Ali Boloukat	Iran	Did not start	
	58	Chhowang Mingyur Tamang	Nepal	Did not start	
	63	Alexandru Matei Oancea	Romania	Did not start	
