= Estonia at the 2024 Winter Youth Olympics =

- Flag of Estonia
- IOC code: EST
- NOC: Estonian Olympic Committee

in Gangwon, South Korea 19 January 2024 – 1 February 2024
- Competitors: 24 in 9 sports
- Flag bearer (opening): Mirjam Revjagin
- Flag bearer (closing): TBD
- Medals: Gold 0 Silver 0 Bronze 0 Total 0

Winter Youth Olympics appearances (overview)
- 2012; 2016; 2020; 2024

Estonia competed at the 2024 Winter Youth Olympics in Gangwon, South Korea, from January 19 to February 1, 2024. This was Estonia's fourth appearance at the Winter Youth Olympic Games, having competed at every Games since the inaugural edition in 2012.

Freestyle skier Mirjam Revjagin was the country's flagbearer during the opening ceremony.

== Competitors ==
The following is the list of number of competitors (per gender) participating at the games per sport/discipline.

| Sport | Men | Women | Total |
|---|---|---|---|
| Alpine skiing | 1 | 2 | 3 |
| Biathlon | 3 | 3 | 6 |
| Cross-country skiing* | 2 | 2 | 4 |
| Figure skating | 1 | 1 | 2 |
| Freestyle skiing | 0 | 2 | 2 |
| Nordic combined | 2 | 0 | 2 |
| Ski jumping | 1 | 0 | 1 |
| Snowboarding | 0 | 3 | 3 |
| Speed skating | 1 | 1 | 2 |
| Total | 10 | 14 | 24 |

- Daniel Varikov will compete in both biathlon and cross-country skiing. His total is counted once in the overall number.

== Alpine skiing ==
Estonia qualified three alpine skiers (one man and two women).

Men

| Athlete | Event | Run 1 | | Run 2 | | Total | |
| Athlete | Event | Time | Rank | Time | Rank | Time | Rank |
|---|---|---|---|---|---|---|---|
| Markus Mesila | Super-G | —N/a | | | | 57.55 | 39 |
| Markus Mesila | Giant slalom | 53.86 | 47 | Did not finish | | | |
| Markus Mesila | Slalom | Did not finish | | | | | |
| Markus Mesila | Combined | Did not finish | | | | | |

Women

| Athlete | Event | Run 1 | | Run 2 | | Total | |
| Athlete | Event | Time | Rank | Time | Rank | Time | Rank |
|---|---|---|---|---|---|---|---|
| Emma Tammemägi | Super-G | —N/a | | | | 58.70 | 41 |
| Emma Tammemägi | Giant slalom | Did not finish | | | | | |
| Emma Tammemägi | Combined | 1:00.73 | 42 | Did not finish | | | |
| Hanna Gret Teder | Giant slalom | 53.99 | 28 | 55.88 | 19 | 1:49.87 | 22 |
| Hanna Gret Teder | Slalom | 56.33 | 40 | 55.99 | 34 | 1:52.32 | 32 |

== Biathlon ==
Men

| Athlete | Event | Time | Misses | Rank |
|---|---|---|---|---|
| Oskar Orupõld | Sprint | 25:30.2 | 4 (2+2) | 66 |
| Oskar Orupõld | Individual | 51:53.3 | 9 (1+5+3+0) | 71 |
| Frederik Välbe | Sprint | 23:58.9 | 3 (1+2) | 32 |
| Frederik Välbe | Individual | 44:21.0 | 2 (1+1+0+0) | 12 |
| Daniel Varikov | Sprint | 24:49.9 | 4 (2+2) | 54 |
| Daniel Varikov | Individual | Did not start | | |

Women

| Athlete | Event | Time | Misses | Rank |
|---|---|---|---|---|
| Kätrin Kärsna | Sprint | 24:11.2 | 4 (3+1) | 46 |
| Kätrin Kärsna | Individual | 46:49.9 | 8 (2+3+0+3) | 68 |
| Laureen Simberg | Sprint | 24:45.3 | 4 (1+3) | 53 |
| Laureen Simberg | Individual | 44:43.9 | 4 (1+0+1+2) | 54 |
| Anlourdees Veerpalu | Sprint | 25:33.4 | 7 (4+3) | 64 |
| Anlourdees Veerpalu | Individual | 42:53.1 | 6 (1+0+3+2) | 29 |

Mixed

| Athletes | Event | Time | Misses | Rank |
|---|---|---|---|---|
| Frederik Välbe; Anlourdees Veerpalu | Single mixed relay | 46:53.4 | 0+9 | 7 |
| Laureen Simberg; Kätrin Kärsna; Oskar Orupõld; Daniel Varikov | Mixed relay | 1:24:52.7 | 4+14 | 12 |

== Cross-country skiing ==
Estonia qualified four cross-country skiers (two per gender).

Men

| Athlete | Event | Qualification | | Quarterfinal | | Semifinal | | Final | |
| Athlete | Event | Time | Rank | Time | Rank | Time | Rank | Time | Rank |
|---|---|---|---|---|---|---|---|---|---|
| Toni Andree Saarepuu | 7.5 km classical | —N/a | | | | | | 21:21.5 | 30 |
| Toni Andree Saarepuu | Sprint freestyle | 3:23.49 | 48 | Did not advance | | | | | |
| Daniel Varikov | 7.5 km classical | —N/a | | | | | | 20:39.4 | 14 |
| Daniel Varikov | Sprint freestyle | 3:31.71 | 57 | Did not advance | | | | | |

Women

| Athlete | Event | Qualification | | Quarterfinal | | Semifinal | | Final | |
| Athlete | Event | Time | Rank | Time | Rank | Time | Rank | Time | Rank |
|---|---|---|---|---|---|---|---|---|---|
| Gerda Kivil | 7.5 km classical | —N/a | | | | | | 23:05.7 | 10 |
| Gerda Kivil | Sprint freestyle | 3:35.89 | 7 Q | 3:40.49 | 3 | Did not advance | | | |
| Herta Rajas | 7.5 km classical | —N/a | | | | | | 24:15.5 | 28 |
| Herta Rajas | Sprint freestyle | 3:41.70 | 20 Q | 3:41.44 | 3 | Did not advance | | | |

Mixed

| Athlete | Event | Time | Rank |
|---|---|---|---|
| Gerda Kivil; Toni Andree Saarepuu; Herta Rajas; Daniel Varikov | Mixed relay | 55:22.4 | 9 |

== Figure skating ==
| Athletes | Event | SP/SD | | FS/FD | | Total | |
| Athletes | Event | Points | Rank | Points | Rank | Points | Rank |
|---|---|---|---|---|---|---|---|
| Jegor Martšenko | Men's singles | 47.89 | 18 | 87.58 | 18 | 135.47 | 18 |
| Marja Eliise Kaljuvere | Women's singles | 56.52 | 8 | 93.39 | 13 | 149.91 | 13 |

== Freestyle skiing ==
Halfpipe, Slopestyle & Big Air

| Athlete | Event | Qualification | | | | Final | | | | |
| Athlete | Event | Run 1 | Run 2 | Best | Rank | Run 1 | Run 2 | Run 3 | Best | Rank |
|---|---|---|---|---|---|---|---|---|---|---|
| Grete-Mia Meentalo | Women's big air | 10.00 | 11.75 | 11.75 | 13 | Did not advance | | | | |
| Grete-Mia Meentalo | Women's halfpipe | 60.25 | 59.75 | 60.25 | 5 Q | 53.50 | 21.75 | 55.50 | 55.50 | 5 |
| Mirjam Revjagin | Women's big air | 55.25 | 60.00 | 60.00 | 12 | Did not advance | | | | |
| Mirjam Revjagin | Women's slopestyle | 45.75 | 11.25 | 45.75 | 13 | Did not advance | | | | |

== Nordic combined ==
Individual

| Athlete | Event | Ski jumping | | | | Cross-country | |
| Athlete | Event | Distance | Points | Rank | Deficit | Time | Rank |
|---|---|---|---|---|---|---|---|
| Fred Gustavson | Men's normal hill/6 km | 77.5 | 62.6 | 28 | +5:14 | 19:49.5 | 30 |
| Karel Pastarus | Men's normal hill/6 km | 90.5 | 101.2 | 18 | +2:39 | 17:23.7 | 23 |

== Ski jumping ==
Estonia qualified one male ski jumper.

Individual

| Athlete | Event | First round | | | Final | | | Total | |
| Athlete | Event | Distance | Points | Rank | Distance | Points | Rank | Points | Rank |
|---|---|---|---|---|---|---|---|---|---|
| Kaimar Vagul | Men's normal hill | 99.5 | 102.9 | 5 | 102.5 | 105.8 | 2 | 208.7 | 5 |

== Snowboarding ==
Snowboard cross

| Athlete | Event | Group stage | | Semifinal | Final |
| Athlete | Event | Points | Rank | Position | Position |
|---|---|---|---|---|---|
| Mai Brit Teder | Women's snowboard cross | 12 | 10 | Did not advance | |

Halfpipe, Slopestyle & Big Air

| Athlete | Event | Qualification | | | | Final | | | | |
| Athlete | Event | Run 1 | Run 2 | Best | Rank | Run 1 | Run 2 | Run 3 | Best | Rank |
|---|---|---|---|---|---|---|---|---|---|---|
| Laura Anga | Women's big air | 58.25 | 22.25 | 58.25 | 13 | Did not advance | | | | |
| Laura Anga | Women's slopestyle | 9.25 | 36.00 | 36.00 | 13 | Did not advance | | | | |
| Triinu Marta Oidermaa | Women's big air | 47.50 | 52.75 | 52.75 | 14 | Did not advance | | | | |
| Triinu Marta Oidermaa | Women's slopestyle | 13.25 | 28.50 | 28.50 | 16 | Did not advance | | | | |

== Speed skating ==
Men

| Athlete | Event | Time | Rank |
|---|---|---|---|
| Sten Talumaa | 500 m | 39.98 | 23 |
| Sten Talumaa | 1500 m | 2:09.09 | 28 |

Women

| Athlete | Event | Time | Rank |
|---|---|---|---|
| Saskia Kütt | 500 m | 43.86 | 28 |
| Saskia Kütt | 1500 m | 2:25.30 | 30 |

Mass Start

| Athlete | Event | Semifinal | | | Final | | |
| Athlete | Event | Points | Time | Rank | Points | Time | Rank |
|---|---|---|---|---|---|---|---|
| Sten Talumaa | Men's mass start | Disqualified | | | Did not advance | | |
| Saskia Kütt | Women's mass start | 0 | 6:12.33 | 15 | Did not advance | | |

== See also ==
- Estonia at the 2024 Summer Olympics
