= Thailand at the 2024 Winter Youth Olympics =

- Flag of Thailand
- IOC code: THA
- NOC: National Olympic Committee of Thailand
- Website: www.olympicthai.or.th (in Thai and English)

in Gangwon, South Korea 19 January 2024 – 1 February 2024
- Competitors: 20 in 9 sports
- Flag bearers (opening): Thanakorn Ngoeichai & Agnese Campeol
- Flag bearer (closing): TBD
- Medals Ranked 27th: Gold 0 Silver 1 Bronze 0 Total 1

Winter Youth Olympics appearances (overview)
- 2020; 2024

Thailand competed at the 2024 Winter Youth Olympics in Gangwon, South Korea, from January 19 to February 1, 2024. This was Thailand's second appearance at the Winter Youth Olympic Games, having competed debuted at the previous edition in 2020.

The National Olympic Committee of Thailand fielded a team of 20 athletes, 8 men and 12 women, to compete in 8 sports. It was the nation's largest ever delegation sent to the Games. Thailand marked its debut in biathlon, bobsleigh, freestyle skiing, luge, skeleton, and snowboarding.

Biathlete Thanakorn Ngoeichai and bobsledder Agnese Campeol were the country's flagbearers during the opening ceremony.

On January 22, bobsledder Agnese Campeol earned the silver medal in the women's monobob, becoming the first Thai athlete and Southeast Asian athlete to win a Winter Youth Olympic medal. This was the third Winter Youth Olympic medal by a tropical nation, after Colombia's silver medal in 2020 and Brazil's bronze medal in 2024.

== Competitors ==
The following is the list of number of competitors participating at the Games per sport/discipline.

Sport	Men	Women	Total
Alpine skiing	1	1	2
Biathlon	1	3	4
Bobsleigh	1	1	2
Cross-country skiing	2	2	4
Freestyle skiing	0	1	1
Luge	1	1	2
Short track speed skating	1	1	2
Skeleton	0	2	2
Snowboarding	1	0	1
Total	8	12	20

== Medalists ==
Medal	Name	Sport	Event	Date
Silver	Agnese Campeol	Bobsleigh	Women's monobob	22 January

== Alpine skiing ==
Thailand qualified two alpine skiers (one per gender).

Athlete	Event	Run 1		Run 2		Total	
Athlete	Event	Time	Rank	Time	Rank	Time	Rank
Pattarapol Saengdaeng	Men's slalom	1:02.04	59	1:11.04	39	2:13.08	39
Pattarapol Saengdaeng	Men's giant slalom	1:04.58	61	56.92	46	2:01.50	46
Phichayaporn Thipkesorn	Women's slalom	1:29.25	59	2:13.08	44	2:54.29	44
Phichayaporn Thipkesorn	Women's giant slalom	1:16.16	52	1:18.71	41	2:34.87	41

== Biathlon ==
Thailand qualified four biathletes (one men and three women).

Athlete	Event	Time	Misses	Rank
Thanakorn Ngoeichai	Men's sprint	33:27.9	6 (1+5)	96
Thanakorn Ngoeichai	Men's individual	57:32.6	11 (3+3+3+2)	93
Jariyawadee Udomlap	Women's sprint	33:30.2	8 (5+3)	87
Jariyawadee Udomlap	Women's individual	1:05:19.0	17 (4+4+4+5)	96
Parichat Bunmani	Women's sprint	32:50.4	8 (3+5)	86
Parichat Bunmani	Women's individual	1:28:10.1	20 (5+5+5+5)	98
Phitchapha Northong	Women's sprint	33:33.5	10 (5+5)	88
Phitchapha Northong	Women's individual	1:00:33.7	13 (3+3+3+4)	95

== Bobsleigh ==
Thailand qualified two bobsledders (one per gender).

Athlete	Event	Run 1		Run 2		Total	
Athlete	Event	Time	Rank	Time	Rank	Time	Rank
Kitthamet Palakai	Men's monobob	55.46	9	55.61	6	1:51.07	7
Agnese Campeol	Women's monobob	56.84	2	57.33	3	1:54.17	2nd place, silver medalist(s)

== Cross-country skiing ==
Thailand qualified four cross-country skier (two per gender).

Individual

Athlete	Event	Qualification		Quarterfinal		Semifinal		Final	
Athlete	Event	Time	Rank	Time	Rank	Time	Rank	Time	Rank
Naravich Saisuk	Men's 7.5 km classical	—N/a						25:52.6	69
Naravich Saisuk	Men's sprint freestyle	3:38.20	64	Did not advance					
Thanatip Bunrit	Men's 7.5 km classical	—N/a						26:31.2	71
Thanatip Bunrit	Men's sprint freestyle	3:48.47	73	Did not advance					
Kanyawat Limsamutchaikul	Women's 7.5 km classical	—N/a						31:46.4	65
Kanyawat Limsamutchaikul	Women's sprint freestyle	4:39.17	66	Did not advance					
Kingkan Duangjumpa	Women's 7.5 km classical	—N/a						30:03.0	61
Kingkan Duangjumpa	Women's sprint freestyle	4:14.18	57	Did not advance					

Team

Athlete	Event	Time	Rank
Kanyawat Limsamutchaikul; Kingkan Duangjumpa; Naravich Saisuk; Thanatip Bunrit	Mixed relay	1:10:17.0	23

== Freestyle skiing ==
Thailand qualified one freestyle skier (one woman).

Athlete	Event	Group Heat		Semifinal	Final	Rank
Athlete	Event	Score	Rank	Opponent Score	Opponent Score	Rank
Natcha Frenkel	Women's dual moguls	8	4	Did not advance		16

== Luge ==
Thailand qualified two lugers (one per gender).

Athlete	Event	Run 1		Run 2		Total	
Athlete	Event	Time	Rank	Time	Rank	Time	Rank
Thiraphat Sata	Men's singles	48.779	18	48.769	20	1:37.548	20
Sunita Chaiyapantho	Women's singles	51.407	28	51.504	27	1:42.911	26

== Short track speed skating ==
Thailand qualified two short track speed skaters (one per gender)

Athlete	Event	Heats		Quarterfinal		Semifinal		Final	
Athlete	Event	Time	Rank	Time	Rank	Time	Rank	Time	Rank
Chonlachart Taprom	500 m	1:08.040	4	Did not advance					
Chonlachart Taprom	1000 m	1:32.316	4	Did not advance					
Chonlachart Taprom	1500 m	—N/a		2:49.322	5	Did not advance			
Punpreeda Prempreecha	500 m	47.029	4	Did not advance					
Punpreeda Prempreecha	1000 m	1:39.344	4	Did not advance					
Punpreeda Prempreecha	1500 m	—N/a		2:27.267	2 Q	2:33.336	6	Did not advance	

== Skeleton ==
Thailand qualified two skeleton racers (two women).

Athlete	Event	Run 1		Run 2		Total	
Athlete	Event	Time	Rank	Time	Rank	Time	Rank
Maturada Kanram	Women's	1:01.90	18	1:01.65	18	2:03.55	18
Phonchanan Pongsak	Women's	57.45	14	58.63	16	1:56.08	14

== Snowboarding ==
Thailand qualified one snowboarder (one men).

Athlete	Event	Qualification					Final				
Athlete	Event	Run 1	Run 2	Run 3	Best	Rank	Run 1	Run 2	Run 3	Best	Rank
Lubpawath Chayametisurat	Men's big air	Did not satrt					Did not advance				
Lubpawath Chayametisurat	Men's slopestyle	Did not satrt					Did not advance				

== See also ==
- Thailand at the 2024 Summer Olympics
