= Slovenia at the 2024 Winter Youth Olympics =

- Flag of Slovenia
- IOC code: SLO
- NOC: Slovenian Olympic Committee

in Gangwon, South Korea 19 January 2024 – 1 February 2024
- Competitors: 28 in 9 sports
- Flag bearers (opening): Taja Bodlaj & Miha Oserban
- Flag bearer (closing): TBD
- Medals Ranked 14th: Gold 2 Silver 3 Bronze 1 Total 6

Winter Youth Olympics appearances
- 2012; 2016; 2020; 2024

Slovenia is scheduled to compete at the 2024 Winter Youth Olympics in Gangwon, South Korea, from 19 January to 1 February 2024. This will be Slovenia's fourth appearance at the Winter Youth Olympic Games, having competed at every Games since the inaugural edition in 2012.

Alpine skier Miha Oserban and ski jumper Taja Bodlaj were the country's flagbearers during the opening ceremony.

== Competitors ==
The following is the list of number of competitors (per gender) participating at the games per sport/discipline.

Sport	Men	Women	Total
Alpine skiing	3	3	6
Biathlon	3	2	5
Cross-country skiing	2	2	4
Curling	1	1	2
Luge	1	0	1
Nordic combined	2	2	4
Short track speed skating	0	1	1
Ski jumping	2	2	4
Snowboarding	1	0	1
Total	15	13	28

== Medalists ==
Medal	Name	Sport	Event	Date
Gold	Taja Bodlaj	Ski jumping	Women's individual normal hill	20 January
Gold	Ajda Košnjek; Urban Simnic; Taja Bodlaj; Enej Faletič	Ski jumping	Mixed team normal hill	21 January
Silver	Ela Sever	Biathlon	Women's sprint	23 January
Silver	Teja Pavec	Nordic combined	Women's individual normal hill/4 km	29 January
Silver	Aljaž Janhar; Tia Malovrh; Teja Pavec; Lovro Percl Seručnik	Nordic combined	Mixed team normal hill/4 × 3.3 km	31 January
Bronze	Tia Malovrh	Nordic combined	Women's individual normal hill/4 km	29 January

== Alpine skiing ==
Slovenia qualified six alpine skiers (three per gender).

Men

Athlete	Event	Run 1		Run 2		Total	
Athlete	Event	Time	Rank	Time	Rank	Time	Rank
Gal Hajdinjak	Super-G	—N/a				Did not finish	
Gal Hajdinjak	Giant slalom	51.73	27	Disqualified			
Gal Hajdinjak	Slalom	48.96	23	Did not finish			
Gal Hajdinjak	Combined	55.94	20	56.37	17	1:52.31	19
Miha Oserban	Super-G	—N/a				57.11	34
Miha Oserban	Giant slalom	Did not finish					
Miha Oserban	Slalom	47.57	6	Did not finish			
Miha Oserban	Combined	55.15	9	55.21	5	1:50.36	4
Jaka Škrjanc	Super-G	—N/a				56.15	25
Jaka Škrjanc	Giant slalom	51.93	31	47.86	23	1:39.79	24
Jaka Škrjanc	Slalom	49.37	25	53.42	11	1:42.79	13
Jaka Škrjanc	Combined	56.89	33	Did not finish			

Women

Athlete	Event	Run 1		Run 2		Total	
Athlete	Event	Time	Rank	Time	Rank	Time	Rank
Ana Bokal	Super-G	—N/a				Did not finish	
Ana Bokal	Giant slalom	Did not finish					
Ana Bokal	Slalom	Did not finish					
Ana Bokal	Combined	58.44	21	55.58	23	1:54.02	23
Ana Merc	Super-G	—N/a				57.79	37
Ana Merc	Giant slalom	52.53	25	56.10	21	1:48.63	20
Ana Merc	Slalom	53.67	27	50.83	22	1:44.50	22
Ana Merc	Combined	59.07	29	Did not finish			
Lana Pušnik	Super-G	—N/a				56.79	31
Lana Pušnik	Giant slalom	Did not finish					
Lana Pušnik	Slalom	Did not finish					
Lana Pušnik	Combined	58.15	17	Did not finish			

Mixed

Athletes	Event	Round of 16	Quarterfinals	Semifinals	Final / BM	
Athletes	Event	Opponent Result	Opponent Result	Opponent Result	Opponent Result	Rank
Ana Bokal; Miha Oserban	Parallel mixed team	United States; L 1–3	Did not advance			

== Biathlon ==
Men

Athlete	Event	Time	Misses	Rank
Nejc Einhauer	Individual	24:35.9	1 (0+1)	50
Nejc Einhauer	Sprint	52:15.6	9 (4+1+2+2)	73
Jaka Pilar	Individual	23:42.5	2 (0+2)	27
Jaka Pilar	Sprint	44:52.1	4 (2+0+2+0)	15
Gregor Rupnik	Individual	26:47.0	6 (3+3)	79
Gregor Rupnik	Sprint	Did not finish		

Women

Athlete	Event	Time	Misses	Rank
Ela Sever	Sprint	20:15.3	3 (2+1)	2nd place, silver medalist(s)
Ela Sever	Individual	42:59.6	9 (3+3+1+2)	31
Ajda Špitalar	Sprint	23:56.0	4 (2+2)	39
Ajda Špitalar	Individual	44:24.1	5 (0+1+2+2)	47

Mixed

Athletes	Event	Time	Misses	Rank
Jaka Pilar; Ela Sever	Single mixed relay	47:13.8	2+19	9
Ela Sever; Ajda Špitalar; Jaka Pilar; Nejc Einhauer	Mixed relay	1:31:35.8	14+19	16

== Cross-country skiing ==
Slovenia qualified four cross-country skiers (two per gender).

Men

Athlete	Event	Qualification		Quarterfinal		Semifinal		Final	
Athlete	Event	Time	Rank	Time	Rank	Time	Rank	Time	Rank
Lovrenc Karničar	7.5 km classical	—N/a						21:56.0	39
Lovrenc Karničar	Sprint freestyle	3:12.74	28 Q	3:08.16	4	Did not advance			
Tine Šporn	7.5 km classical	—N/a						21:05.8	26
Tine Šporn	Sprint freestyle	3:22.67	44	Did not advance					

Women

Athlete	Event	Qualification		Quarterfinal		Semifinal		Final	
Athlete	Event	Time	Rank	Time	Rank	Time	Rank	Time	Rank
Ula Kuhar	7.5 km classical	—N/a						23:33.0	20
Ula Kuhar	Sprint freestyle	3:43.58	23 Q	3:46.03	6	Did not advance			
Zala Zupan	7.5 km classical	—N/a						25:15.5	36
Zala Zupan	Sprint freestyle	3:50.31	32	Did not advance					

Mixed

Athlete	Event	Time	Rank
Ula Kuhar; Tine Šporn; Zala Zupan; Lovrenc Karničar	Mixed relay	58:40.0	15

== Curling ==
Slovenia qualified a mixed doubles pair for a total of two athletes (one per gender).

Summary

Team	Event	Group Stage						Quarterfinal	Semifinal	Final / BM	
Team	Event	Opposition Score	Opposition Score	Opposition Score	Opposition Score	Opposition Score	Rank	Opposition Score	Opposition Score	Opposition Score	Rank
Pavla Kavčič; Maks Omerzel	Mixed doubles	Ukraine; W 11–5	Sweden; L 4–15	Qatar; W 12–4	Norway; L 4–14	United States; L 0–12	4	Did not advance			16

=== Mixed doubles ===
Group B	W	L	W–L	DSC
United States	5	0	–	61.18
Sweden	4	1	–	78.69
Norway	3	2	–	34.37
Slovenia	2	3	–	112.84
Ukraine	1	4	–	74.81
Qatar	0	5	–	155.39

Round robin

Draw 3

Saturday, January 27, 14:00

Sheet B	1	2	3	4	5	6	7	8	Final
Slovenia (Kavčič / Omerzel)	1	0	4	0	3	2	1	X	11
Ukraine (Lytvynenko / Shlyk) 🔨	0	1	0	4	0	0	0	X	5

Draw 7

Sunday, January 28, 18:00

Sheet D	1	2	3	4	5	6	7	8	Final
Sweden (Roxin / Meyerson) 🔨	0	4	0	4	2	2	3	X	15
Slovenia (Kavčič / Omerzel)	1	0	3	0	0	0	0	X	4

Draw 10

Monday, January 29, 18:00

Sheet C	1	2	3	4	5	6	7	8	Final
Qatar (Al-Fahad / Alnaimi) 🔨	0	2	0	0	2	0	0	X	4
Slovenia (Kavčič / Omerzel)	3	0	4	1	0	1	3	X	12

Draw 12

Tuesday, January 30, 14:00

Sheet C	1	2	3	4	5	6	7	8	Final
Slovenia (Kavčič / Omerzel)	0	3	0	0	1	0	X	X	4
Norway (Hausstaetter / Svorkmo Lundberg) 🔨	4	0	3	2	0	5	X	X	14

Draw 14

Wednesday, January 31, 9:00

Sheet A	1	2	3	4	5	6	7	8	Final
United States (Wendling / Paral) 🔨	1	2	3	1	2	3	X	X	12
Slovenia (Kavčič / Omerzel)	0	0	0	0	0	0	X	X	0

== Luge ==
Slovenia qualified one male luger.

Men

Athlete	Event	Run 1		Run 2		Total	
Athlete	Event	Time	Rank	Time	Rank	Time	Rank
Miha Vozelj	Singles	48.863	19	47.794	15	1:36.657	18

== Nordic combined ==
Individual

Athlete	Event	Ski jumping				Cross-country	
Athlete	Event	Distance	Points	Rank	Deficit	Time	Rank
Aljaž Janhar	Men's normal hill/6 km	94.0	97.7	19	+2:53	17:32.9	24
Lovro Percl Seručnik	Men's normal hill/6 km	91.0	94.8	20	+3:05	17:07.4	21
Tia Malovrh	Women's normal hill/4 km	100.0	118.0	4	+1:01	11:14.0	3rd place, bronze medalist(s)
Teja Pavec	Women's normal hill/4 km	100.0	128.6	2	+0:19	10:49.9	2nd place, silver medalist(s)

Team

Athlete	Event	Ski jumping			Cross-country	
Athlete	Event	Points	Rank	Deficit	Time	Rank
Tia Malovrh; Lovro Percl Seručnik; Aljaž Janhar; Teja Pavec	Mixed team	402.7	6	+0:46	34:23.6	2nd place, silver medalist(s)

== Short track speed skating ==
Women

Athlete	Event	Heats		Quarterfinal		Semifinal		Final	
Athlete	Event	Time	Rank	Time	Rank	Time	Rank	Time	Rank
Dina Špan	500 m	47.449	3	Did not advance					
Dina Špan	1000 m	1:42.319	3	Did not advance					
Dina Špan	1500 m	—N/a		2:48.096	5	Did not advance			

== Ski jumping ==
Slovenia qualified four ski jumpers (two per gender).

Individual

Athlete	Event	First round			Final			Total	
Athlete	Event	Distance	Points	Rank	Distance	Points	Rank	Points	Rank
Enej Faletič	Men's normal hill	96.0	98.0	9	102.0	103.0	4	201.0	8
Urban Šimnic	Men's normal hill	100.0	100.6	7	95.0	87.9	13	188.5	12
Taja Bodlaj	Women's normal hill	107.0	110.5	1	100.5	105.2	2	215.7	1st place, gold medalist(s)
Ajda Košnjek	Women's normal hill	91.0	80.0	11	99.0	98.4	6	178.4	7

Team

Athlete	Event	First round				Final				Total	
Athlete	Event	Distance	Points	Team points	Rank	Distance	Points	Team points	Rank	Points	Rank
Ajda Košnjek; Urban Šimnic; Taja Bodlaj; Enej Faletič	Mixed team	103.0; 101.5; 100.5; 102.0	107.3; 108.4; 107.4; 113.9	437.0	1	98.5; 106.0; 106.5; 100.0	108.5; 122.0; 114.9; 111.3	456.7	1	893.7	1st place, gold medalist(s)

== Snowboarding ==
Halfpipe, Slopestyle & Big Air

Athlete	Event	Qualification				Final				
Athlete	Event	Run 1	Run 2	Best	Rank	Run 1	Run 2	Run 3	Best	Rank
Aljaž Sladič	Men's slopestyle	16.25	11.50	16.25	22	Did not advance				
Aljaž Sladič	Men's big air	51.00	45.00	51.00	15	Did not advance				
Aljaž Sladič	Men's halfpipe	25.00	29.25	29.25	16	Did not advance				

== See also ==
- Slovenia at the 2024 Summer Olympics
