= Alice Padilha =

Brazilian alpine skier (born 2007)

Personal information
- Born: 22 June 2007 (age 19) Rio de Janeiro, Brazil

Skiing career
- Country: Brazil
- Sport: Alpine skiing
- Disciplines: Slalom, giant slalom

Olympics
- Teams: 1 – (2026)
- Medals: 0

Alice Padilha (born 22 June 2007) is a Brazilian alpine skier. Born in Rio de Janeiro, she moved with her family to the United States of America when she was three years old, settling in Connecticut. She competed in interstate youth competitions in ski the United States until the family moved to Vermont. Despite the distance, Alice maintained her connection with Brazil and became part of the Brazilian alpine skiing team at the age of 16. Her brother Arthur Padilha is also a skier competing for Brazil.

Alice participated at the 2024 Winter Youth Olympics, in Gangwon, South Korea, where she was one of the flag bearers at the Opening Ceremony, together with bobsledder André Luiz Silva. She competed in slalom and giant slalom, but failed to finish in both events.

Representing Brazil at the 2026 Winter Olympics she competed in the slalom, but did not finish the first run of the event.

== Olympic results ==
Year
Year	Age	Slalom	Giant slalom	Super-G	Downhill	Team combined
2026	18	DNF1	—	—	—	—
