= Mongolia at the 2024 Winter Youth Olympics =

- Flag of Mongolia
- IOC code: MGL
- NOC: Mongolian Olympic Committee

in Gangwon, South Korea 19 January 2024 – 1 February 2024
- Competitors: 12 in 3 sports
- Flag bearers (opening): Manlaijav Myangaibaatar & Nyamsuren Demuul
- Flag bearer (closing): TBD
- Medals: Gold 0 Silver 0 Bronze 0 Total 0

Winter Youth Olympics appearances
- 2012; 2016; 2020; 2024

Mongolia is scheduled to compete at the 2024 Winter Youth Olympics in Gangwon, South Korea, from January 19 to February 1, 2024. This will be Mongolia's fourth appearance at the Winter Youth Olympic Games, having competed at every Games since the inaugural edition in 2012.

The Mongolian team consisted of 12 athletes (six per gender) competing in three sports. Alpine skier Manlaijav Myangaibaatar and biathlete Nyamsuren Demuul were the country's flagbearers during the opening ceremony.

== Competitors ==
The following is the list of number of competitors (per gender) participating at the games per sport/discipline.

Sport	Men	Women	Total
Alpine skiing	1	1	2
Biathlon	3	3	6
Cross-country skiing	2	2	4
Total	6	6	12

== Alpine skiing ==
Mongolia qualified two alpine skiers (one per gender). This marked the country's debut in the sport at the Winter Youth Olympics.

Athlete	Event	Run 1		Run 2		Total	
Athlete	Event	Time	Rank	Time	Rank	Time	Rank
Manlaijav Myangaibaatar	Men's super-G	—N/a				DNS	
Manlaijav Myangaibaatar	Men's giant slalom	1:05.45	63	1:01.50	48	2:06.95	48
Manlaijav Myangaibaatar	Men's slalom	1:11.90	62	1:17.66	40	2:29.56	40
Khaliun Khuderchuluun	Women's super-G	—N/a				DNS	
Khaliun Khuderchuluun	Women's giant slalom	1:15.92	51	1:20.31	42	2:36.23	42
Khaliun Khuderchuluun	Women's slalom	1:31.15	60	1:19.45	43	2:50.60	43

== Biathlon ==
Mongolia qualified six biathletes (three per gender).

Men

Athlete	Event	Time	Misses	Rank
Sukhbat Borkhuu	Sprint	26:13.6	6 (3+3)	75
Sukhbat Borkhuu	Individual	52:40.1	11 (2+2+4+3)	76
Temuujin Byambadorj	Sprint	28:37.8	3 (1+2)	88
Temuujin Byambadorj	Individual	53:32.3	6 (0+2+2+2)	80
Amarsanaa Turtogtokh	Sprint	26:40.9	4 (1+3)	78
Amarsanaa Turtogtokh	Individual	57:15.8	10 (5+2+2+1)	92

Women

Athlete	Event	Time	Misses	Rank
Nyamsuren Demuul	Sprint	28:11.1	5 (4+1)	77
Nyamsuren Demuul	Individual	55:20.4	10 (3+1+4+2)	90
Erdenetungalag Khash-Erdene	Sprint	28:16.4	6 (5+1)	78
Erdenetungalag Khash-Erdene	Individual	52:14.9	10 (3+2+2+3)	86
Oyutsolmon Oleksandrovna	Sprint	34:58.8	6 (4+2)	90
Oyutsolmon Oleksandrovna	Individual	1:00:33.7	10 (3+2+4+1)	94

Mixed

Athletes	Event	Time	Misses	Rank
Erdenetungalag Khash-Erdene; Nyamsuren Demuul; Sukhbat Borkhuu; Amarsanaa Turtogtokh	Mixed relay	LAP		21

== Cross-country skiing ==
Mongolia qualified four cross-country skiers (two per gender).

Men

Athlete	Event	Qualification		Quarterfinal		Semifinal		Final	
Athlete	Event	Time	Rank	Time	Rank	Time	Rank	Time	Rank
Khuslen Ariunjargal	7.5 km classical	—N/a						22:01.7	42
Khuslen Ariunjargal	Sprint freestyle	3:15.83	35	Did not advance					
Usukh-Ireedui Turbat	7.5 km classical	—N/a						20:51.9	22
Usukh-Ireedui Turbat	Sprint freestyle	3:19.94	41	Did not advance					

Women

Athlete	Event	Qualification		Quarterfinal		Semifinal		Final	
Athlete	Event	Time	Rank	Time	Rank	Time	Rank	Time	Rank
Nandintsetseg Naranbat	7.5 km classical	—N/a						26:43.4	46
Nandintsetseg Naranbat	Sprint freestyle	4:06.76	50	Did not advance					
Uyanga Jamyanjav	7.5 km classical	—N/a						27:11.8	49
Uyanga Jamyanjav	Sprint freestyle	4:03.61	46	Did not advance					

Mixed

Athlete	Event	Time	Rank
Nandintsetseg Naranbat; Usukh-Ireedui Turbat; Uyanga Jamyanjav; Khuslen Ariunjargal	Mixed relay	1:00:27.6	19

== See also ==
- Mongolia at the 2024 Summer Olympics
