= Romania at the 2024 Winter Youth Olympics =

- Flag of Romania
- IOC code: ROU
- NOC: Romanian Olympic Committee

in Gangwon, South Korea 19 January 2024 – 1 February 2024
- Competitors: 33 in 9 sports
- Flag bearer (opening): Sami Mihai & Kata Mandel
- Flag bearer (closing): TBD
- Medals Ranked 30th: Gold 0 Silver 0 Bronze 1 Total 1

Winter Youth Olympics appearances
- 2012; 2016; 2020; 2024

Romania is scheduled to compete at the 2024 Winter Youth Olympics in Gangwon, South Korea, from January 19 to February 1, 2024, This will be Romania's fourth appearance at the Winter Youth Olympic Games, having competed at every Games since the inaugural edition in 2012.

The Romanian team consisted of 33 athletes (17 men and 16 women) competing in nine sports. Bobsledder Sami Mihai and snowboarder Kata Mandel were the country's flagbearers during the opening ceremony.

== Competitors ==
The following is the list of number of competitors (per gender) participating at the games per sport/discipline.

Sport	Men	Women	Total
Alpine skiing	1	1	2
Biathlon	3	3	6
Bobsleigh	2	2	4
Cross-country skiing	1	1	2
Luge	3	2	5
Skeleton	2	2	4
Ski jumping	2	2	4
Snowboarding	1	1	2
Speed skating	2	2	4
Total	17	16	33

== Medalists ==
Medal	Name	Sport	Event	Date
Bronze	Mihaela Alexia Anton	Bobsleigh	Women's monobob	22 January

== Alpine skiing ==
Romania qualified two alpine skiers (one per gender).

Men

Athlete	Event	Run 1		Run 2		Total	
Athlete	Event	Time	Rank	Time	Rank	Time	Rank
Alexandru Matei Oancea	Super-G	—				Did not start	
Alexandru Matei Oancea	Giant slalom	Did not finish					
Alexandru Matei Oancea	Slalom	52.30	44	57.50	25	1:49.80	26

Women

Athlete	Event	Run 1		Run 2		Total	
Athlete	Event	Time	Rank	Time	Rank	Time	Rank
Ioana Corlățeanu	Super-G	—				Did not start	
Ioana Corlățeanu	Giant slalom	54.02	29	56.85	25	1:50.87	25
Ioana Corlățeanu	Slalom	56.36	41	53.82	27	1:50.18	28

== Biathlon ==
Romania qualified six biathletes (three per gender).

Men

Athlete	Event	Time	Misses	Rank
Dragoș Bărbieru	Sprint	24:02.3	3 (1+2)	35
Dragoș Bărbieru	Individual	48:08.3	7 (2+1+1+3)	38
Hunor Udvari	Sprint	28:23.9	5 (2+3)	87
Hunor Udvari	Individual	52:43.9	5 (0+2+1+2)	78
Horia Urs	Sprint	22:49.8	1 (0+1)	13
Horia Urs	Individual	46:11.2	5 (0+3+0+2)	25

Women

Athlete	Event	Time	Misses	Rank
Szidónia Kelemen	Sprint	27:25.0	7 (5+2)	74
Szidónia Kelemen	Individual	51:46.2	13 (4+3+4+2)	85
Paula Morozan-Irinaru	Sprint	26:33.8	2 (0+2)	69
Paula Morozan-Irinaru	Individual	56:08.5	8 (5+0+0+3)	91
Krisztina Silló	Sprint	22:59.0	2 (1+1)	31
Krisztina Silló	Individual	47:29.1	7 (2+2+1+2)	72

Mixed

Athletes	Event	Time	Misses	Rank
Krisztina Silló; Horia Urs	Single mixed relay	49:12.8	2+13	16
Krisztina Silló; Paula Morozan-Irinaru; Horia Urs; Dragoș Bărbieru	Mixed relay	Lapped		19

== Bobsleigh ==
Romania qualified four bobsledders (two per gender).

Athlete	Event	Run 1		Run 2		Total	
Athlete	Event	Time	Rank	Time	Rank	Time	Rank
Sami Mihai	Men's monobob	55.00	3	55.69	7	1:50.69	6
Raul Predescu	Men's monobob	55.72	12	56.34	14	1:52.06	12
Mihaela Anton	Women's monobob	57.15	6	57.19	2	1:54.34	3rd place, bronze medalist(s)
Luiza Olaru	Women's monobob	57.60	8	57.60	4	1:55.20	6

== Cross-country skiing ==
Romania qualified two cross-country skiers (one per gender).

Men

Athlete	Event	Qualification		Quarterfinal		Semifinal		Final	
Athlete	Event	Time	Rank	Time	Rank	Time	Rank	Time	Rank
Ștefan Paul Gherghel	7.5 km classical	—						23:28.6	53
Ștefan Paul Gherghel	Sprint freestyle	3:36.49	62	Did not advance					

Women

Athlete	Event	Qualification		Quarterfinal		Semifinal		Final	
Athlete	Event	Time	Rank	Time	Rank	Time	Rank	Time	Rank
Boglárka Páll	7.5 km classical	—						26:43.7	47
Boglárka Páll	Sprint freestyle	4:05.56	49	Did not advance					

== Luge ==
Men

Athlete	Event	Run 1		Run 2		Total	
Athlete	Event	Time	Rank	Time	Rank	Time	Rank
Vlad Florin Mușei	Singles	47.648	13	47.383	11	1:35.031	10

Women

Athlete	Event	Run 1		Run 2		Total	
Athlete	Event	Time	Rank	Time	Rank	Time	Rank
Ionela Mădălina Dobrean	Singles	49.756	19	50.612	24	1:40.368	22
Ana Cezara Teodorescu	Singles	49.626	18	49.538	15	1:39.164	16

Mixed

Athlete	Event	Women' singles		Men' singles		Doubles		Total	
Athlete	Event	Time	Rank	Time	Rank	Time	Rank	Time	Rank
Ana Cezara Teodorescul; Vlad Florin Mușei; Nicolae Todirică; Alexandru Ioan Bălan	Team relay	50.890	10	50.934	5	53.093	8	2:34.917	8

== Skeleton ==
Athlete	Event	Run 1		Run 2		Total	
Athlete	Event	Time	Rank	Time	Rank	Time	Rank
Theodor Buligescu	Men's	53.69	6	53.47	5	1:47.16	6
Luca Horațiu Ungureanu	Men's	54.07	7	54.65	9	1:48.72	8
Adelina Gabriela Bădăra	Women's	55.58	6	55.65	9	1:51.23	8
Ioana Toma	Women's	55.79	9	56.24	12	1:52.03	10

== Ski jumping ==
Romania qualified four ski jumpers (two per gender).

Individual

Athlete	Event	First round			Final			Total	
Athlete	Event	Distance	Points	Rank	Distance	Points	Rank	Points	Rank
Radu Borca	Men's normal hill	64.5	26.7	38	65.0	23.7	38	50.4	38
Cosmin Florin Donciu	Men's normal hill	73.0	44.6	34	78.5	48.9	34	93.5	35
Andra Maria Gheorghe	Women's normal hill	53.0	0.0	33	41.0	0.0	31	0.0	33
Szerena Maria Stanciu	Women's normal hill	45.0	0.0	32	43.5	0.0	31	0.0	32

Team

Athlete	Event	First round				Final				Total	
Athlete	Event	Distance	Points	Team points	Rank	Distance	Points	Team points	Rank	Points	Rank
Andra Maria Gheorghe; Cosmin Florin Donciu; Szerena Maria Stanciu; Radu Borca	Mixed team	60.5; 79.5; 47.0; 64.0	15.0; 60.7; 0.0; 30.8	106.5	15	55.0; 81.5; 44.5; 67.5	9.5; 67.3; 0.0; 38.8	115.6	15	222.1	15

== Snowboarding ==
Snowboard cross

Athlete	Event	Group stage		Semifinal	Final
Athlete	Event	Points	Rank	Position	Position
Csanád Bakó-Vilhelem	Men's snowboard cross	8	13	Did not advance	

== Speed skating ==
Men

Athlete	Event	Time	Rank
Tudor Debu	500 m	41.63	28
Tudor Debu	1500 m	2:08.14	26
Vlad Popa	500 m	39.59	19
Vlad Popa	1500 m	2:02.32	21

Women

Athlete	Event	Time	Rank
Iulia Ionescu	500 m	45.47	31
Iulia Ionescu	1500 m	2:19.63	26
Teodora Pârvu	500 m	45.26	30
Teodora Pârvu	1500 m	2:26.02	31

Mass Start

Athlete	Event	Semifinal			Final		
Athlete	Event	Points	Time	Rank	Points	Time	Rank
Tudor Debu	Men's mass start	4	6:21.36	4 Q	0	5:41.33	17
Vlad Popa	Men's mass start	0	5:39.19	13	Did not advance		
Iulia Ionescu	Women's mass start	0	6:18.71	16	Did not advance		
Teodora Pârvu	Women's mass start	0	6:28.38	12	Did not advance		

== See also ==
- Romania at the 2024 Summer Olympics
