= Polina Putsko =

Ukrainian biathlete (born 2006)

Personal information
- Full name: Polina Putsko
- Born: 26 June 2006 (age 20) Konotop, Ukraine
- Height: 1.63 m (5 ft 4 in)
- Weight: 59 kg (130 lb)

Sport
Medal record
Women's biathlon
Representing Ukraine
Winter Youth Olympics
Bronze medal – third place	2024 Gangwon	Sprint

Polina Putsko (Ukrainian: Поліна Пуцко; born 26 June 2006) is a Ukrainian biathlete.

== Career ==
She represented Ukraine at the 2024 Winter Youth Olympics, held in Gangwon, South Korea and received a bronze medal in girl's sprint. That's the first medal in Ukrainian national team at this Winter Youth Olympics.

She also competed in girl's 10 km individual event at the 2024 Winter Youth Olympics, but she didn't receive a medal (17th place).

Then she competed in the 4x6 km mixed relay event at the 2024 Winter Youth Olympics with Valeria Sheihas, Dmytro Kryikov and Oleksandr Bilanenko without reaching any medals (9th place).

== Personal life ==
She is the daughter of Inna Suprun, a Ukrainian biathlete and 2009 European champion in relay.
