= Alpensia Cross-Country Skiing Centre and Alpensia Biathlon Centre =

Skiing venue in South Korea

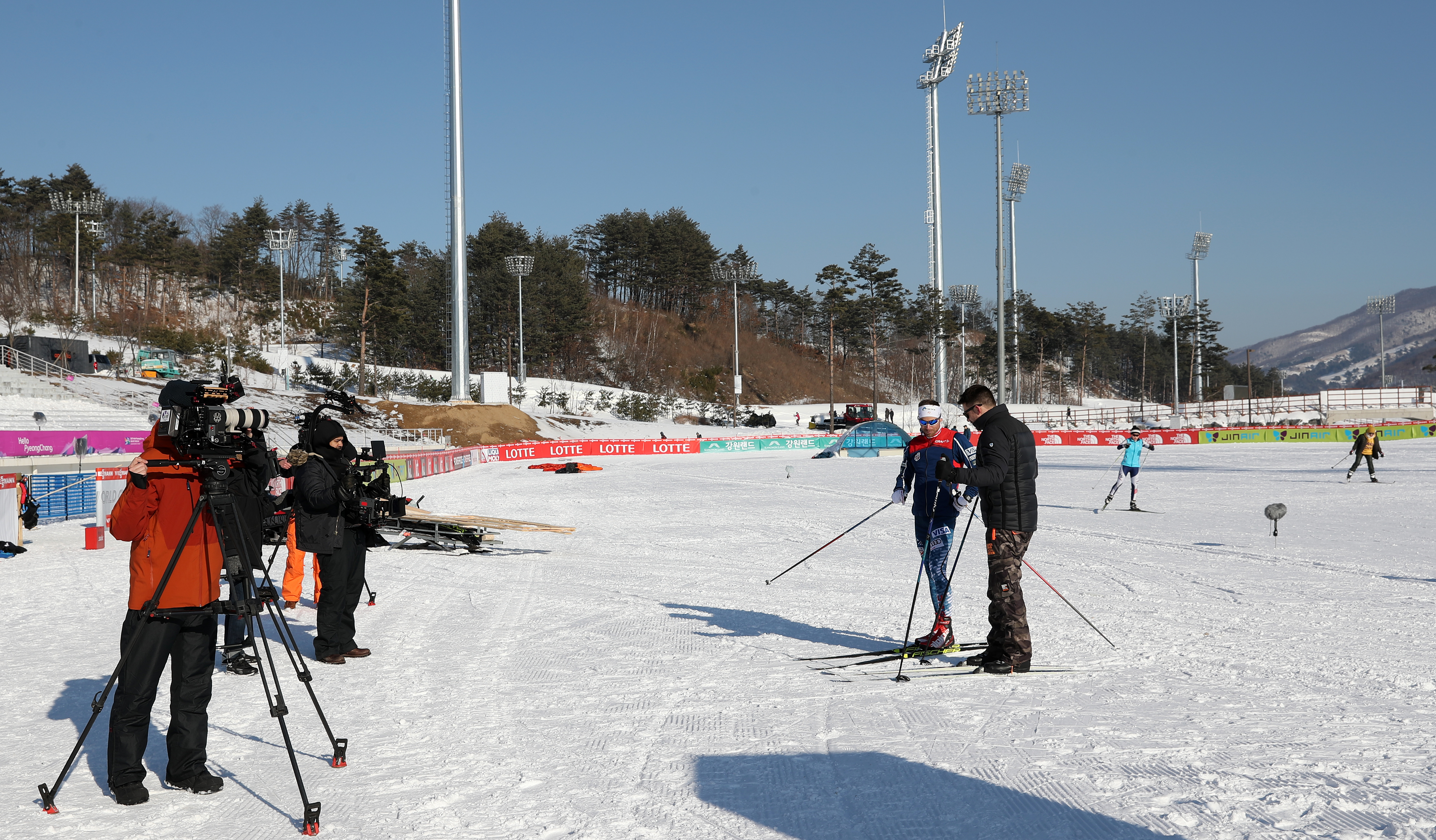
Alpensia Cross-Country Skiing Centre (37°39′51″N 128°41′07″E)

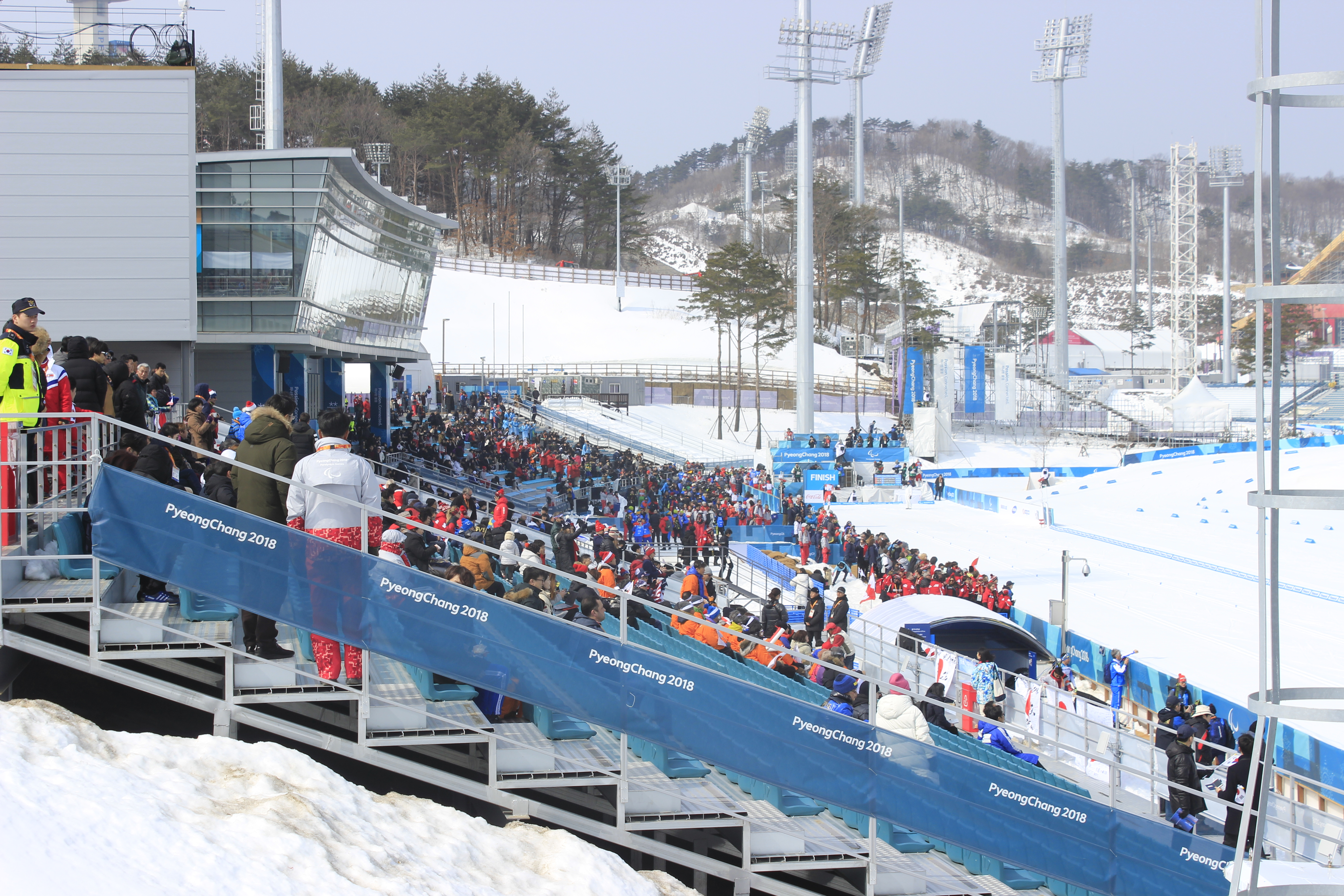
Alpensia Biathlon Centre (37°39′47″N 128°41′16″E)

Alpensia Cross-Country Skiing Centre (Korean: 알펜시아 크로스컨트리 경기장) and Alpensia Biathlon Centre (알펜시아 바이애슬론 경기장) are sport venues in the Alpensia resort, located in Daegwallyeong-myeon, Pyeongchang-gun, Gangwon-do, South Korea. They are used for cross-country skiing and biathlon respectively. Each grandstand of the two venues is contiguous and similar in appearance. They also adjoin the ski jumping hills. In the non-winter season, the venues are also used as golf courses named Alpensia 700.

== History ==
The venues were first completed in December 1995. They were called several names, which roughly mean the Gangwon (Kangwon) provincial Nordic venue. They hosted the cross-country skiing and biathlon events at the 1999 Asian Winter Games.

After the establishment of Alpensia which includes the venues, they underwent major renovations. At the 2013 Special Olympics World Winter Games, the cross-country skiing venue hosted the cross-country skiing events, while the biathlon venue hosted the snowshoeing events.

For the 2018 Winter Olympics and Paralympics they were named current Alpensia Cross-Country Skiing Centre and Alpensia Biathlon Centre respectively. At the Winter Olympics, the former hosted the cross-country skiing and Nordic combined events, and the latter hosted the biathlon events. At the Winter Paralympics, the latter hosted all of the Nordic skiing events.

== Facilities ==
According to the official website of the 2018 Winter Olympics linked below, the longest cross-country skiing course is 3.75 kilometres long with an altitude change of 54 metres (751 to 805 m above sea level). The longest biathlon course is 4 km with an altitude change of 47 m (749 to 796 m)
