= China at the 2024 Winter Youth Olympics =

- Flag of China
- IOC code: CHN
- NOC: Chinese Olympic Committee

in Gangwon, South Korea 19 January 2024 – 1 February 2024
- Competitors: 55 in 12 sports
- Flag bearer (opening): Zhang Jingyue
- Flag bearer (closing): TBD
- Medals Ranked 5th: Gold 6 Silver 9 Bronze 3 Total 18

Winter Youth Olympics appearances (overview)
- 2012; 2016; 2020; 2024

China is scheduled to compete at the 2024 Winter Youth Olympics in Gangwon, South Korea, from 19 January to 1 February 2024. This will be China's fourth appearance at the Winter Youth Olympic Games, having competed at every Games since the inaugural edition in 2012.

The Chinese team consisted of 55 athletes. Hockey player Zhang Jingyue was the country's flagbearer during the opening ceremony.

== Competitors ==
The following is the list of number of competitors (per gender) participating at the games per sport/discipline.

Sport	Men	Women	Total
Alpine skiing	1	1	2
Bobsleigh	1	0	1
Curling	3	3	6
Figure skating	2	2	4
Freestyle skiing	3	5	8
Ice hockey	0	13	13
Luge	1	1	2
Short track speed skating	2	2	4
Skeleton	0	1	1
Ski jumping	2	2	4
Snowboarding	3	3	6
Speed skating	2	2	4
Total	20	35	55

== Medalists ==
Medal	Name	Sport	Event	Date
Gold	Yang Jingru	Short track speed skating	Women's 1500 metres	20 January
Gold	Li Jinzi	Short track speed skating	Women's 1000 metres	21 January
Gold	Zhang Xinzhe	Short track speed skating	Men's 1000 metres	21 January
Gold	Li Jinzi; Yang Jingru; Zhang Bohao; Zhang Xinzhe	Short track speed skating	Mixed relay	24 January
Gold	Liu Yunqi; Pan Baoshuo	Speed skating	Mixed relay	25 January
Gold	Liu Yishan	Freestyle skiing	Women's halfpipe	31 January
Silver	Li Jinzi	Short track speed skating	Women's 1500 metres	20 January
Silver	Zhang Xinzhe	Short track speed skating	Men's 1500 metres	20 January
Silver	Yang Jingru	Short track speed skating	Women's 1000 metres	21 January
Silver	Zhang Xinzhe	Short track speed skating	Men's 500 metres	22 January
Silver	Liu Yunqi	Speed skating	Women's 1500 metres	23 January
Silver	Pan Baoshuo	Speed skating	Men's 1500 metres	23 January
Silver	Han Linshan	Freestyle skiing	Women's slopestyle	24 January
Silver	Pan Baoshuo	Speed skating	Men's mass start	26 January
Silver	Chen Zihan	Freestyle skiing	Women's halfpipe	31 January
Bronze	Chi Xiangyu	Bobsleigh	Men's monobob	23 January
Bronze	China women's national under-16 ice hockey team	Ice hockey	Women's 3x3 tournament	25 January
Bronze	Liu Yunqi	Speed skating	Women's mass start	26 January

== Alpine skiing ==
China qualified two alpine skiers (one per gender).

Men

Athlete	Event	Run 1		Run 2		Total	
Athlete	Event	Time	Rank	Time	Rank	Time	Rank
Wang Shuai	Super-G	—N/a				1:03.55	49
Wang Shuai	Giant slalom	59.33	56	54.38	42	1:53.71	41
Wang Shuai	Slalom	57.80	56	DQ			
Wang Shuai	Combined	1:02.72	50	1:10.99	36	2:13.71	36

Women

Athlete	Event	Run 1		Run 2		Total	
Athlete	Event	Time	Rank	Time	Rank	Time	Rank
Wang Ning	Super-G	—N/a				1:02.27	47
Wang Ning	Giant slalom	1:00.21	43	1:04.50	36	2:04.71	36
Wang Ning	Slalom	1:04.46	53	1:01.49	39	2:05.95	39
Wang Ning	Combined	1:04.22	49	1:08.51	36	2:12.73	36
Zhang Guiyuan	Super-G	—N/a				1:01.66	45
Zhang Guiyuan	Giant slalom	1:00.46	44	1:03.55	35	2:04.01	35
Zhang Guiyuan	Slalom	1:03.10	52	1:00.31	38	2:03.41	37
Zhang Guiyuan	Combined	1:03.44	48	1:06.03	35	2:09.47	36

== Bobsleigh ==
China qualified one male bobsledder.

Athlete	Event	Run 1		Run 2		Total	
Athlete	Event	Time	Rank	Time	Rank	Time	Rank
Chi Xiangyu	Men's monobob	55.45	8	54.73	1	1:50.18	3rd place, bronze medalist(s)

== Curling ==
China qualified a mixed team and mixed doubles pair for a total of six athletes.

Summary

Team	Event	Group Stage								Quarterfinal	Semifinal	Final / BM	
Team	Event	Opposition Score	Opposition Score	Opposition Score	Opposition Score	Opposition Score	Opposition Score	Opposition Score	Rank	Opposition Score	Opposition Score	Opposition Score	Rank
Li Zetai; Chen Zaoxue; Zhang Minghang; Gao Ya	Mixed team	Turkey; W 6–2	Japan; W 7–6	New Zealand; W 9–1	Norway; W 11–4	Sweden; L 4–5	Nigeria; W 22–2	United States; W 6–5	1 Q	Bye	Denmark; L 4–6	Switzerland; L 8–10	4
Gong Changyuting; Xu Bokang	Mixed doubles	Japan; W 7–5	Latvia; W 8–5	Brazil; W 10–3	Turkey; W 13–4	New Zealand; W 12–4	—N/a		1 Q	Sweden; L 6–9	Did not advance		5

=== Mixed team ===
Group A	Skip	W	L	W–L	PF	PA	EW	EL	BE	SE	DSC
China	Li Zetai	6	1	1–0	65	25	28	17	0	12	59.04
United States	Kenna Ponzio	6	1	0–1	68	26	31	16	1	15	51.38
Japan	Kaito Fujii	5	2	1–0	64	26	27	17	2	11	39.53
Sweden	Vilmer Nygren	5	2	0–1	55	42	27	19	5	10	58.05
Norway	Alexander Johansen	3	4	–	49	39	25	19	2	11	65.33
Turkey	Muhammed Taha Zenit	2	5	–	41	40	16	26	5	5	82.17
New Zealand	Jed Nevill	1	6	–	27	44	18	23	3	6	86.52
Nigeria	Goodnews Charles	0	7	–	6	133	4	39	1	0	199.60

Round robin

Draw 1

Saturday, January 20, 10:00

Sheet C	1	2	3	4	5	6	7	8	Final
Turkey (Zenit)	0	1	0	0	1	0	0	X	2
China (Li) 🔨	1	0	1	0	0	3	1	X	6

Draw 2

Saturday, January 20, 18:00

Sheet D	1	2	3	4	5	6	7	8	Final
Japan (Fujii) 🔨	2	0	1	0	0	3	0	0	6
China (Li)	0	2	0	1	0	0	2	2	7

Draw 3

Sunday, January 21, 14:00

Sheet B	1	2	3	4	5	6	7	8	Final
China (Li) 🔨	3	1	3	1	1	0	X	X	9
New Zealand (Nevill)	0	0	0	0	0	1	X	X	1

Draw 4

Monday, January 22, 10:00

Sheet D	1	2	3	4	5	6	7	8	Final
China (Li) 🔨	2	0	3	0	4	0	2	X	11
Norway (Johansen)	0	1	0	2	0	1	0	X	4

Draw 5

Monday, January 22, 18:00

Sheet A	1	2	3	4	5	6	7	8	Final
Sweden (Nygren) 🔨	0	2	0	0	0	0	0	3	5
China (Li)	0	0	2	0	0	1	1	0	4

Draw 6

Tuesday, January 23, 14:00

Sheet B	1	2	3	4	5	6	7	8	Final
Nigeria (Charles)	0	0	0	2	0	0	X	X	2
China (Li) 🔨	6	3	5	0	6	2	X	X	22

Draw 7

Wednesday, January 24, 9:00

Sheet A	1	2	3	4	5	6	7	8	Final
China (Li)	2	0	2	0	0	2	0	0	6
United States (Ponzio) 🔨	0	1	0	1	1	0	1	1	5

Semifinal

Thursday, January 25, 9:00

Sheet A	1	2	3	4	5	6	7	8	Final
China (Li) 🔨	2	0	1	0	0	1	0	0	4
Denmark (Schmidt)	0	2	0	2	1	0	0	1	6

Bronze medal game

Thursday, January 25, 14:30

Sheet B	1	2	3	4	5	6	7	8	9	Final
China (Li) 🔨	1	0	0	3	0	1	0	3	0	8
Switzerland (Dryburgh)	0	2	0	0	4	0	2	0	2	10

=== Mixed doubles ===
Group C	W	L	W–L	DSC
China	5	0	–	56.80
Japan	4	1	–	38.84
Latvia	3	2	–	77.39
Turkey	2	3	–	89.37
New Zealand	1	4	–	94.80
Brazil	0	5	–	112.92

Round robin

Draw 4

Saturday, January 27, 18:00

Sheet A	1	2	3	4	5	6	7	8	Final
China (Gong / Xu)	0	2	1	0	2	2	0	X	7
Japan (Tanaka / Kawai) 🔨	1	0	0	2	0	0	2	X	5

Draw 5

Sunday, January 28, 10:00

Sheet C	1	2	3	4	5	6	7	8	Final
Latvia (Regža / Zass)	0	0	2	0	1	0	0	2	5
China (Gong / Xu) 🔨	3	2	0	1	0	1	1	0	8

Draw 10

Monday, January 29, 18:00

Sheet D	1	2	3	4	5	6	7	8	Final
Brazil (Gentile / Melo) 🔨	2	0	0	0	0	1	0	X	3
China (Gong / Xu)	0	2	2	2	1	0	3	X	10

Draw 13

Tuesday, January 30, 18:00

Sheet C	1	2	3	4	5	6	7	8	Final
China (Gong / Xu) 🔨	5	0	2	2	0	4	X	X	13
Turkey (Ekmekçi / Aybar)	0	2	0	0	2	0	X	X	4

Draw 14

Wednesday, January 31, 9:00

Sheet B	1	2	3	4	5	6	7	8	Final
New Zealand (Russell / Nevill)	0	0	3	0	1	0	X	X	4
China (Gong / Xu) 🔨	6	3	0	1	0	2	X	X	12

Quarterfinal

Wednesday, January 31, 19:00

Sheet A	1	2	3	4	5	6	7	8	Final
China (Gong / Xu)	0	2	0	0	1	0	3	0	6
Sweden (Roxin / Meyerson) 🔨	4	0	1	1	0	2	0	1	9

== Figure skating ==
Athlete	Event	SP/SD		FS/FD		Total	
Athlete	Event	Points	Rank	Points	Rank	Points	Rank
Tian Tonghe	Men's singles	67.08	5	112.24	11	179.32	8
Gao Shiqi	Women's singles	60.28	5	108.13	8	168.41	7
Liu Tong; Ge Quanshuo	Ice dance	50.92	6	75.58	6	126.50	7

Team event

Athlete	Event	Free skate / Free dance				Total	
Athlete	Event	Men's	Women's	Pairs	Ice dance	Points	Rank
Athlete	Event	Points Team points	Points Team points	Points Team points	Points Team points	Points	Rank
Tian Tonghe (M); Gao Shiqi (W); Liu Tong / Ge Quanshuo (ID)	Team event	125.12; 3	118.31; 3	0	80.42; 2	8	4

== Freestyle skiing ==
Dual moguls
Individual

Athlete	Event	Group Stage						Semifinals	Final / BM	
Athlete	Event	Opposition Result	Opposition Result	Opposition Result	Opposition Result	Points	Rank	Opposition Result	Opposition Result	Rank
Long Hao	Men's dual moguls	Gianella (SUI); W 3–1	Gravenfors (SWE); W 3–2	Huff (USA); L 2–2	Lampi (FIN); W 3–2	11	2	Did not advance		
Li Ruilin	Women's dual moguls	Taguchi (JPN); W 3–0	Passaretta (ITA); W 3–2	Moon (KOR); DNF 1–3	Frenkel (THA); W 3–1	10	3	Did not advance		

Team

Athlete	Event	Round of 16	Quarterfinals	Semifinals	Final / BM	
Athlete	Event	Opposition Result	Opposition Result	Opposition Result	Opposition Result	Rank
Li Ruilin; Long Hao	Mixed team	Moon / Kim (KOR); L 34–36	Did not advance			

Halfpipe, Slopestyle & Big Air

Athlete	Event	Qualification				Final				
Athlete	Event	Run 1	Run 2	Best	Rank	Run 1	Run 2	Run 3	Best	Rank
Li Hongzu	Men's halfpipe	38.50	60.75	60.75	8 Q	61.25	58.00	65.25	65.25	8
Su Shuaibing	Men's halfpipe	75.25	46.75	75.25	3 Q	82.00	57.75	34.00	82.00	4
Chen Zihan	Women's halfpipe	74.25	89.00	89.00	1 Q	83.75	77.00	24.50	83.75	2nd place, silver medalist(s)
Han Linshan	Women's big air	73.50	41.50	73.50	5 Q	62.00	62.75	70.50	133.25	6
Han Linshan	Women's slopestyle	68.00	67.25	68.00	7 Q	70.25	10.75	81.50	81.50	2nd place, silver medalist(s)
Liu Yishan	Women's halfpipe	86.75	83.25	86.75	2 Q	89.75	92.25	86.50	92.25	1st place, gold medalist(s)
Xiao Siyu	Women's big air	77.00	44.75	77.00	3 Q	82.00	77.75	23.50	159.75	4
Xiao Siyu	Women's slopestyle	60.75	62.25	62.25	9 Q	38.75	3.00	68.50	68.50	4

== Ice hockey ==
China qualified a team of thirteen ice hockey players for the women's 3-on-3 tournament.

Roster

Canadian Myles Fitzgerald is the team's head coach.

- Ju Sihan
- Kou Chenfei – A
- Li Jun
- Li Xin
- Li Yifei – A
- Mi Lan
- Tian Xueying
- Wang Bing
- Wang Jinghan
- Xin Yufei
- Zhang Anna – C
- Zhang Jingyue
- Zhao Guiyun

=== Women's 3x3 tournament ===
Summary

Key:

- GWS – Game winning shots

Team	Event	Group stage								Semifinal	Final	
Team	Event	Opponent Score	Opponent Score	Opponent Score	Opponent Score	Opponent Score	Opponent Score	Opponent Score	Rank	Opponent Score	Opponent Score	Rank
China	Women's 3x3 tournament	South Korea; W 6–3	Italy; W 4–3	Hungary; L 3–13	Netherlands; W 17–0	Turkey; W 9–2	Mexico; W 20–1	Australia; W 11–3	2	South Korea; L 4–6	Italy; W 8–7	3rd place, bronze medalist(s)

Preliminary round

Pos	Team	Pld	W	OTW	OTL	L	GF	GA	GD	Pts	Qualification
1	Hungary	7	7	0	0	0	130	5	+125	21	Semifinals
2	China	7	6	0	0	1	70	25	+45	18	Semifinals
3	South Korea (H)	7	4	1	0	2	48	30	+18	14	Semifinals
4	Italy	7	4	0	1	2	67	31	+36	13	Semifinals
5	Turkey	7	3	0	0	4	36	41	−5	9	
6	Australia	7	2	0	0	5	23	75	−52	6	
7	Mexico	7	1	0	0	6	18	71	−53	3	
8	Netherlands	7	0	0	0	7	5	119	−114	0	

Source: IOC
(H) Host

20 January 2024; 16:00	South Korea	3–6 (1–3, 0–3, 2–0)	China	Gangneung Hockey Centre

Game reference
Referees: (Finland) Ilona Silander (Malaysia) Mei Wah Wan

21 January 2024; 12:00	China	4–3 (3–1, 1–2, 0–0)	Italy	Gangneung Hockey Centre

Game reference
Referees: (Ukraine) Anhelina Maifeld (Finland) Ilona Silander

21 January 2024; 19:00	Hungary	13–3 (3–0, 3–2, 7–1)	China	Gangneung Hockey Centre

Game reference

Referees:
(Mexico) María Chávez
(Canada) Beatrice Fortin

PP	1–0
PP	2–0
EQ	3–0
EQ	4–0
EQ	5–0
	5–1	SH
EQ	6–1
	6–2	EQ
EQ	7–2
PP	8–2
PP	9–2
PP	10–2
PP	11–2
EQ	12–2
EQ	13–2
	13–3	PP

22 January 2024; 13:30	China	17–0 (5–0, 6–0, 6–0)	Netherlands	Gangneung Hockey Centre

Game reference
Referees: (Ukraine) Anhelika Maifeld (Malaysia) Wan Mei Wah

22 January 2024; 20:30	China	9–2 (4–1, 4–0, 1–1)	Turkey	Gangneung Hockey Centre

Game reference
Referees: (Mexico) María Chávez (Canada) Beatrice Fortin

23 January 2024; 12:00	Mexico	1–20 (0–6, 1–6, 0–8)	China	Gangneung Hockey Centre

Game reference
Referees: (Ukraine) Anhelina Maifeld (Malaysia) Wan Mei Wah

23 January 2024; 20:30	Australia	3–11 (1–4, 1–5, 1–2)	China	Gangneung Hockey Centre

Game reference
Referees: (Mexico) María Chávez (Ukraine) Anhelina Maifeld

Semifinal

24 January 2024; 13:30	China	4–6 (3–3, 0–2, 1–1)	South Korea	Gangneung Hockey Centre

Game reference
Referees: (Mexico) María Chávez (Malaysia) Wan Mei Wah

Bronze medal game

25 January 2024; 12:00	China	8–7 (3–2, 2–4, 3–1)	Italy	Gangneung Hockey Centre

Game reference
Referees: (Mexico) María Chávez (Malaysia) Wan Mei Wah

== Luge ==
China qualified two lugers (one per gender).

Men

Athlete	Event	Run 1		Run 2		Total	
Athlete	Event	Time	Rank	Time	Rank	Time	Rank
Wang Qingxiu	Singles	48.169	17	48.572	19	1:36.741	19

Women

Athlete	Event	Run 1		Run 2		Total	
Athlete	Event	Time	Rank	Time	Rank	Time	Rank
Xin Lihui	Singles	49.283	14	49.344	14	1:38.627	14

== Short track speed skating ==
Men

Athlete	Event	Heats		Quarterfinal		Semifinal		Final	
Athlete	Event	Time	Rank	Time	Rank	Time	Rank	Time	Rank
Zhang Bohao	500 m	42.688	1 Q	41.141	2 Q	41.464	2 FA	45.685	4
Zhang Bohao	1000 m	1:32.421	1 Q	1:29.750	1 Q	1:26.473	2 FA	PEN	
Zhang Bohao	1500 m	—N/a		2:22.677	1 Q	2:35.697	1 FA	2:22.191	5
Zhang Xinzhe	500 m	42.189	1 Q	41.901	1 Q	41.775	2 FA	41.755	2nd place, silver medalist(s)
Zhang Xinzhe	1000 m	1:34.407	1 Q	1:27.738	1 Q	1:26.373	1 FA	1:26.257	1st place, gold medalist(s)
Zhang Xinzhe	1500 m	—N/a		2:20.170	1 Q	2:21.977	2 FA	2:22.095	2nd place, silver medalist(s)

Women

Athlete	Event	Heats		Quarterfinal		Semifinal		Final	
Athlete	Event	Time	Rank	Time	Rank	Time	Rank	Time	Rank
Li Jinzi	500 m	45.287	1 Q	44.878	2 Q	44.501	4 FB	45.888	7
Li Jinzi	1000 m	1:35.908	1 Q	1:36.258	1 Q	1:32.783	1 FA	1:40.803	1st place, gold medalist(s)
Li Jinzi	1500 m	—N/a		2:40.035	2 Q	2:27.079	2 FA	2:41.543	2nd place, silver medalist(s)
Yang Jingru	500 m	45.444	1 Q	44.975	3	Did not advance			
Yang Jingru	1000 m	1:37.155	1 Q	1:33.158	1 Q	1:32.344	1 FA	1:40.996	2nd place, silver medalist(s)
Yang Jingru	1500 m	—N/a		2:40.098	3 Q	2:25.980	1 FA	2:33.148	1st place, gold medalist(s)

Mixed

Athlete	Event	Semifinal		Final	
Athlete	Event	Time	Rank	Time	Rank
Zhang Bohao; Zhang Xinzhe; Li Jinzi; Yang Jingru	Mixed relay	2:46.403	1 FA	2:46.516	1st place, gold medalist(s)

== Skeleton ==
Athlete	Event	Run 1		Run 2		Total	
Athlete	Event	Time	Rank	Time	Rank	Time	Rank
Liang Yuxin	Women's	1:01.06	17	55.47	8	1:56.53	15

== Ski jumping ==
China qualified four ski jumpers (two per gender).

Individual

Athlete	Event	First round			Final			Total	
Athlete	Event	Distance	Points	Rank	Distance	Points	Rank	Points	Rank
Ren Haoran	Men's normal hill	91.5	77.9	20	77.5	52.2	31	130.1	27
Zheng Pengbo	Men's normal hill	90.5	81.7	18	76.5	46.2	36	127.9	29
Tang Jiahong	Women's normal hill	73.0	42.3	21	67.0	33.7	25	76.0	23
Weng Yangning	Women's normal hill	96.5	88.9	7	92.5	76.5	11	165.4	11

Team

Athlete	Event	First round			Final			Total	
Athlete	Event	Distance	Points	Rank	Distance	Points	Rank	Points	Rank
Tang Jiahong; Ren Haoran; Weng Yangning; Zheng Pengbo	Mixed team	334.0	263.3	12	329.0	279.9	12	543.2	12

== Snowboarding ==
Halfpipe, Slopestyle & Big Air

Athlete	Event	Qualification				Final				
Athlete	Event	Run 1	Run 2	Best	Rank	Run 1	Run 2	Run 3	Best	Rank
Ge Chunyu	Men's big air	81.00	29.00	81.00	8 Q	80.25	21.50	14.25	101.75	6
Ge Chunyu	Men's slopestyle	42.50	21.25	42.50	10 Q	21.00	48.00	32.00	48.00	9
Ren Chongshuo	Men's halfpipe	26.25	58.00	58.00	10 Q	51.25	11.00	12.50	51.25	10
Zhang Xinhao	Men's halfpipe	21.75	51.50	51.50	11	Did not advance				
Ai Yanyi	Women's halfpipe	65.50	64.50	65.50	7 Q	60.50	26.75	13.00	60.50	7
Zhang Xiaonan	Women's big air	73.25	29.00	73.25	9 Q	78.25	12.50	63.50	141.75	8
Zhang Xiaonan	Women's slopestyle	27.25	43.25	43.25	11	Did not advance				

== Speed skating ==
Men

Athlete	Event	Time	Rank
Pan Baoshuo	500 m	37.64	10
Pan Baoshuo	1500 m	1:52.84	2nd place, silver medalist(s)
Zhang Wanli	500 m	37.509	9
Zhang Wanli	1500 m	1:56.34	11

Women

Athlete	Event	Time	Rank
Liu Yunqi	500 m	40.10	4
Liu Yunqi	1500 m	2:03.29	2nd place, silver medalist(s)
Zhang Shaohan	500 m	40.35	5
Zhang Shaohan	1500 m	2:09.00	10

Mass Start

Athlete	Event	Semifinal			Final		
Athlete	Event	Points	Time	Rank	Points	Time	Rank
Pan Baoshuo	Men's mass start	3	6:26.84	5 Q	22	5:30.12	2nd place, silver medalist(s)
Zhang Wanli	Men's mass start	3	5:42.36	5 Q	4	5:50.53	5
Liu Yunqi	Women's mass start	20	6:23.63	2 Q	10	5:54.49	3rd place, bronze medalist(s)
Zhang Shaohan	Women's mass start	4	5:59.21	4 Q	4	5:54.99	5

Mixed relay

Athlete	Event	Semifinal		Final	
Athlete	Event	Time	Rank	Time	Rank
Liu Yunqi; Pan Baoshuo	Mixed relay	3:08.31	3 Q	3:11.74	1st place, gold medalist(s)

== See also ==
- China at the 2024 Summer Olympics
