= Australia at the 2024 Winter Youth Olympics =

- Flag of Australia
- IOC code: AUS
- NOC: Australian Olympic Committee

in Gangwon, South Korea 19 January 2024 – 1 February 2024
- Competitors: 47 in 8 sports
- Flag bearers (opening): Duncan Cowan & Tara Baker
- Flag bearer (closing): TBD
- Medals Ranked 24th: Gold 0 Silver 2 Bronze 1 Total 3

Winter Youth Olympics appearances
- 2012; 2016; 2020; 2024

Australia is scheduled to compete at the 2024 Winter Youth Olympics in Gangwon, South Korea, from 19 January to 1 February 2024, This will be Australia's fourth appearance at the Winter Youth Olympic Games, having competed at every Games since the inaugural edition in 2012.

The Australian team consisted of 47 athletes (16 men and 31 women) competing in eight sports. This was the largest ever team the country has sent to the Winter Youth Olympics. Freestyle skier Duncan Cowan and ice hockey player Tara Baker were the country's flagbearers during the opening ceremony.

== Competitors ==
The following is the list of number of competitors (per gender) participating at the games per sport/discipline.

Sport	Men	Women	Total
Alpine skiing	1	1	2
Biathlon	3	3	6
Cross-country skiing	2	2	4
Figure skating	1	2	3
Freestyle skiing	4	4	8
Ice hockey	0	13	13
Short track speed skating	1	0	1
Snowboarding	4	6	10
Total	16	31	47

== Medalists ==
Medal	Name	Sport	Event	Date
Silver	Lottie Lodge	Freestyle skiing	Women's dual moguls	27 January
Silver	Daisy Thomas	Freestyle skiing	Women's big air	28 January
Bronze	William Martin; Abbey Wilson	Snowboarding	Mixed team snowboard cross	21 January

== Alpine skiing ==
Australia qualified two alpine skiers (one per gender).

Athlete	Event	Run 1		Run 2		Total	
Athlete	Event	Time	Rank	Time	Rank	Time	Rank
Max Kelly	Men's giant slalom	DNF					
Max Kelly	Men's slalom	51.41	37	55.77	18	1:47.18	22
Arkie Lennon	Women's giant slalom	DNF					
Arkie Lennon	Women's slalom	55.01	32	DNF			

== Biathlon ==
Australia qualified six biathletes (three per gender).

Men

Athlete	Event	Time	Misses	Rank
Phoenix Sparke	Sprint	23:59.9	5 (4+1)	33
Phoenix Sparke	Individual	48:13.5	8 (0+3+3+2)	39
Matthew Wilby	Sprint	30:02.8	3 (1+2)	92
Matthew Wilby	Individual	58:46.2	6 (2+2+1+1)	95
Edward Woodhouse-Bedak	Sprint	27:50.8	5 (2+3)	84
Edward Woodhouse-Bedak	Individual	55:54.2	12 (4+3+2+3)	88

Women

Athlete	Event	Time	Misses	Rank
Bridget Harvey	Sprint	26:15.4	7 (3+4)	68
Bridget Harvey	Individual	46:06.2	7 (1+2+2+2)	62
Ava McCann	Sprint	25:02.0	3 (0+3)	56
Ava McCann	Individual	44:43.0	6 (0+2+2+2)	53
Alessandra Sydun-West	Sprint	25:19.8	4 (1+3)	61
Alessandra Sydun-West	Individual	49:17.7	8 (2+2+1+3)	81

Mixed

Athletes	Event	Time	Misses	Rank
Ava McCann; Phoenix Sparke	Single mixed relay	48:45.3	17 (2+15)	14
Bridget Harvey; Alessandra Sydun-West; Phoenix Sparke; Edward Woodhouse-Bedak	Mixed relay	LAP	20 (5+15)	17

== Cross-country skiing ==
Australia qualified four cross-country skiers (two per gender).

Men

Athlete	Event	Qualification		Quarterfinal		Semifinal		Final	
Athlete	Event	Time	Rank	Time	Rank	Time	Rank	Time	Rank
Samuel Johnson	7.5 km classical	—N/a						23:19.4	52
Samuel Johnson	Sprint freestyle	3:22.63	43	Did not advance					
Clancy Merrick Harvey	7.5 km classical	—N/a						22:43.1	48
Clancy Merrick Harvey	Sprint freestyle	3:29.93	56	Did not advance					

Women

Athlete	Event	Qualification		Quarterfinal		Semifinal		Final	
Athlete	Event	Time	Rank	Time	Rank	Time	Rank	Time	Rank
Rosie Franzke	7.5 km classical	—N/a						25:32.7	38
Rosie Franzke	Sprint freestyle	3:59.58	43	Did not advance					
Satara Moon	7.5 km classical	—N/a						26:23.2	44
Satara Moon	Sprint freestyle	4:11.55	54	Did not advance					

Mixed

Athlete	Event	Time	Rank
Rosie Franzke; Clancy Merrick Harvey; Satara Moon; Samuel Johnson	Mixed relay	59:40.8	18

== Figure skating ==
Australia qualified three figure skaters (one man and two women). The pairs quota of two athletes was secured at the 2023 World Junior Figure Skating Championships. The singles quota was earned based on the results of the 2023–24 ISU Junior Grand Prix ranking.

Athlete	Event	SP		FS		Total	
Athlete	Event	Points	Rank	Points	Rank	Points	Rank
Sienna Kaczmarczyk	Women's singles	39.97	17	72.49	17	112.46	17
Peyton Bellamy-Martins / Kryshtof Pradeaux	Pairs	29.03	4	59.33	4	88.36	4

== Freestyle skiing ==
Australia qualified 8 athletes in freestyle skiing.

Dual moguls
Individual

Athlete	Event	Group Stage						Semifinals	Final / BM	
Athlete	Event	Opposition Result	Opposition Result	Opposition Result	Opposition Result	Points	Rank	Opposition Result	Opposition Result	Rank
Edward Hill	Men's dual moguls	Nakamura (JPN); L 2–3	Koehler (CAN); W 3–2	Kim (KOR); W 3–2	Dooley (IRL); W 3–DNF	11	3	Did not advance		
Lottie Lodge	Women's dual moguls	Joly (FRA); L 2–3	Feklistova (KAZ); W 3–2	Sakai (JPN); W 3–2	Kisil (UKR); W 3–2	11	1 Q	McLarnon (USA); W 20–15	Lemley (USA); L 13–22	2nd place, silver medalist(s)

Team

Athlete	Event	Round of 16	Quarterfinals	Semifinals	Final / BM	
Athlete	Event	Opposition Result	Opposition Result	Opposition Result	Opposition Result	Rank
Lottie Lodge; Edward Hill	Mixed team	Lamontagne / Koehler (CAN); W 52–18	Sakai / Nakamura (JPN); L 20–50	Did not advance		

Ski cross
Individual

Athlete	Event	Group heats		Semifinal	Final
Athlete	Event	Points	Rank	Position	Position
Duncan Cowan	Men's ski cross	16	3 Q	DNF SF	6
Bayley Sadler	Men's ski cross	13	9	Did not advance	
Dakota Turner	Women's ski cross	15	7	Did not advance	

Team

Athlete	Event	Pre-heats	Quarterfinal	Semifinal	Final
Athlete	Event	Position	Position	Position	Position
Duncan Cowan; Dakota Turner	Team ski cross	—N/a	4	Did not advance	

Halfpipe, Slopestyle & Big Air

Athlete	Event	Qualification				Final				
Athlete	Event	Run 1	Run 2	Best	Rank	Run 1	Run 2	Run 3	Best	Rank
Joey Elliss	Men's big air	74.00	91.75	91.75	2 Q	87.00	45.00	47.00	134.00	5
Joey Elliss	Men's slopestyle	31.00	59.00	59.00	13	Did not advance				
Lucinda Laird	Women's big air	4.50	6.50	6.50	15	Did not advance				
Lucinda Laird	Women's slopestyle	33.00	18.50	33.00	16	Did not advance				
Daisy Thomas	Women's big air	53.50	84.25	84.25	2 Q	91.00	81.75	31.75	171.75	2nd place, silver medalist(s)
Daisy Thomas	Women's slopestyle	69.00	53.50	69.00	6 Q	64.75	67.25	62.25	67.25	5

== Ice hockey ==
Australia qualified a team of thirteen ice hockey players for the women's 3-on-3 tournament.

Roster

Remi Harvey was the team's head coach.

- Tara Baker – C
- Hannah Cryan
- Gwen Ellis
- Olivia Gargano
- Grace Kalambokas
- Jasmin Mayor
- Johanna Meissner
- Katie Meyer
- Poppy Noone
- Sophie Reader
- Annika Schmitz – A
- Elin Schmitz
- Georgia Watts – A

=== Women's 3x3 tournament ===
Summary

Key:

- GWS – Game winning shots

Team	Event	Group stage								Semifinal	Final	
Team	Event	Opponent Score	Opponent Score	Opponent Score	Opponent Score	Opponent Score	Opponent Score	Opponent Score	Rank	Opponent Score	Opponent Score	Rank
Australia	Women's 3x3 tournament	Netherlands; W 6–1	South Korea; L 2–12	Italy; L 4–15	Hungary; L 1–22	Mexico; W 5–4	Turkey; L 2–10	China; L 3–11	6	Did not advance		

Preliminary round

Pos	Team	Pld	W	OTW	OTL	L	GF	GA	GD	Pts	Qualification
1	Hungary	7	7	0	0	0	130	5	+125	21	Semifinals
2	China	7	6	0	0	1	70	25	+45	18	Semifinals
3	South Korea (H)	7	4	1	0	2	48	30	+18	14	Semifinals
4	Italy	7	4	0	1	2	67	31	+36	13	Semifinals
5	Turkey	7	3	0	0	4	36	41	−5	9	
6	Australia	7	2	0	0	5	23	75	−52	6	
7	Mexico	7	1	0	0	6	18	71	−53	3	
8	Netherlands	7	0	0	0	7	5	119	−114	0	

Source: IOC
(H) Host

20 January 2024; 16:00	Netherlands	1–6 (1–0, 0–4, 0–2)	Australia	Gangneung Hockey Centre

Game reference
Referees: (Canada) Beatrice Fortin (Ukraine) Anhelina Maifeld

21 January 2024; 13:30	Australia	2–12 (0–3, 0–5, 2–4)	South Korea	Gangneung Hockey Centre

Game reference
Referees: (Mexico) María Chávez (Ukraine) Anhelina Maifeld

21 January 2024; 20:30	Italy	15–4 (5–1, 9–2, 1–1)	Australia	Gangneung Hockey Centre

Game reference
Referees: (Canada) Beatrice Fortin (Malaysia) Mei Wah Wan

22 January 2024; 12:00	Australia	1–22 (0–5, 0–8, 1–9)	Hungary	Gangneung Hockey Centre

Game reference
Referees: (Canada) Beatrice Fortin (Finland) Ilona Silander

22 January 2024; 19:00	Mexico	4–5 (0–1, 2–1, 2–3)	Australia	Gangneung Hockey Centre

Game reference
Referees: (Mexico) María Chávez (Ukraine) Anhelina Maifeld

23 January 2024; 13:30	Turkey	10–2 (3–1, 2–1, 5–0)	Australia	Gangneung Hockey Centre

Game reference
Referees: (Canada) Beatrice Fortin (Ukraine) Anhelina Maifeld

23 January 2024; 20:30	Australia	3–11 (1–4, 1–5, 1–2)	China	Gangneung Hockey Centre

Game reference
Referees: (Mexico) María Chávez (Ukraine) Anhelina Maifeld

== Short track speed skating ==
Australia qualified one male short track speed skater.

Men

Athlete	Event	Heats		Quarterfinal		Semifinal		Final	
Athlete	Event	Time	Rank	Time	Rank	Time	Rank	Time	Rank
Aditya Nghiem	500 m	47.879	4	Did not advance					
Aditya Nghiem	1000 m	1:43.999	4	Did not advance					
Aditya Nghiem	1500 m	—N/a		2:41.252	5	Did not advance			

== Snowboarding ==
Australia qualified 10 athletes in snowboarding.

Snowboard cross

Athlete	Event	Group heats		Semifinal	Final
Athlete	Event	Points	Rank	Position	Position
William Martin	Men's snowboard cross	14	6	Did not advance	
Cameron Turner	Men's snowboard cross	13	8	Did not advance	
Lara Walsh	Women's snowboard cross	12	9	Did not advance	
Abbey Wilson	Women's snowboard cross	18	3 Q	2 Q	4

Mixed

Athlete	Event	Pre-heats	Quarterfinal	Semifinal	Final
Athlete	Event	Position	Position	Position	Position
William Martin; Abbey Wilson	Team snowboard cross	—N/a	1 Q	2 Q	3rd place, bronze medalist(s)
Cameron Turner; Lara Walsh	Team snowboard cross	—N/a	4	Did not advance	

Halfpipe, Slopestyle & Big Air

Athlete	Event	Qualification				Final				
Athlete	Event	Run 1	Run 2	Best	Rank	Run 1	Run 2	Run 3	Best	Rank
Milo Botterill	Men's big air	8.50	34.00	34.00	18	Did not advance				
Milo Botterill	Men's slopestyle	6.50	18.00	18.00	20	Did not advance				
Tai Vaughan	Men's halfpipe	40.00	43.50	43.50	14	Did not advance				
Sascha Elvy	Women's halfpipe	42.75	41.00	42.75	12	Did not advance				
Amelie Haskell	Women's halfpipe	47.25	31.75	47.25	11	Did not advance				
Ally Hickman	Women's big air	19.25	78.75	78.75	7 Q	59.75	26.50	66.00	125.75	9
Ally Hickman	Women's slopestyle	53.75	28.50	53.75	9 Q	16.25	50.75	61.00	61.00	8
Halle McRae	Women's big air	14.75	64.00	64.00	11	Did not advance				
Halle McRae	Women's slopestyle	10.25	21.50	21.50	18	Did not advance				

== See also ==
- Australia at the 2024 Summer Olympics
