= Turkey at the 2024 Winter Youth Olympics =

- Flag of Turkey
- IOC code: TUR
- NOC: Turkish National Olympic Committee

in Gangwon, South Korea 19 January 2024 – 1 February 2024
- Competitors: 24 in 5 sports
- Flag bearer (opening): Muhammed Bozdağ & Sidre Hacıosmanoğlu
- Flag bearer (closing): TBD
- Medals Ranked 27th: Gold 0 Silver 1 Bronze 0 Total 1

Winter Youth Olympics appearances (overview)
- 2012; 2016; 2020; 2024

Turkey (officially competing as Türkiye) is scheduled to compete at the 2024 Winter Youth Olympics in Gangwon, South Korea, from 19 January to 1 February 2024. This will be Turkey's fourth appearance at the Winter Youth Olympic Games, having competed at every Games since the inaugural edition in 2012.

The Turkish team comprises 24 athletes (6 men and 18 women) competing in five sports. Short track speed skater Muhammed Bozdağ and ice hockey player Sidre Hacıosmanoğlu were the country's flagbearers during the opening ceremony.

On 21 January, short track speed skater Muhammed Bozdağ earned the silver medal in the men's 1000 metres, becoming the first Turkish athlete to win a Winter Olympic medal outside of mixed-NOC competition. Ice hockey player Sidre Özer was the first Turkish athlete to win a Winter Olympic medal, earning bronze with the mixed-NOC "Team Blue" in the girls' 3x3 ice hockey mixed tournament at the 2020 Winter Youth Olympics.

== Competitors ==
The following is the list of number of competitors (per gender) participating at the games per sport/discipline.

Sport	Men	Women	Total
Alpine skiing	1	1	2
Biathlon	0	1	1
Curling	3	3	6
Ice hockey	0	13	13
Short track speed skating	2	0	2
Total	6	18	24

== Medalists ==
Medal	Name	Sport	Event	Date
Silver	Muhammed Bozdağ	Short track speed skating	Men's 1000 metres	21 January

== Alpine skiing ==
Turkey qualified two alpine skiers (one per gender).

Athlete	Event	Run 1		Run 2		Total	
Athlete	Event	Time	Rank	Time	Rank	Time	Rank
Thomas Kaan Önol Lang	Men's super-G	—				Did not start	
Thomas Kaan Önol Lang	Men's giant slalom	54.59	51	Did not finish			
Thomas Kaan Önol Lang	Men's slalom	51.92	40	56.74	23	1:48.66	23
Ada Hasırcı	Women's giant slalom	56.60	39	1:01.21	33	1:57.81	33
Ada Hasırcı	Women's slalom	Did not finish					

== Biathlon ==
Turkey qualified one female biathlete.

Athlete	Event	Time	Misses	Rank
Zülal Türk	Sprint	29:09.5	8 (3+5)	82
Zülal Türk	Individual	48:21.7	5 (1+1+2+1)	78

== Curling ==
Turkey qualified a mixed team and mixed doubles pair for a total of six athletes.

Summary

Team	Event	Group Stage								Quarterfinal	Semifinal	Final / BM	
Team	Event	Opposition Score	Opposition Score	Opposition Score	Opposition Score	Opposition Score	Opposition Score	Opposition Score	Rank	Opposition Score	Opposition Score	Opposition Score	Rank
Muhammed Taha Zenit; Burcu Haşıl; Muhammet Berat Ateş; Şüheda Karacalı	Mixed team	China; L 2–6	Nigeria; W 22–2	United States; L 2–8	Sweden; L 7–8	Norway; L 0–5	Japan; L 2–8	New Zealand; W 6–3	6	Did not advance			12
Derya Ekmekçi; Berat Aybar	Mixed doubles	Latvia; L 1–10	New Zealand; W 6–3	Japan; L 5–9	China; L 4–13	Brazil; W 10–5	—		4	Did not advance			15

=== Mixed team ===
Group A	Skip	W	L	W–L	PF	PA	EW	EL	BE	SE	DSC
China	Li Zetai	6	1	1–0	65	25	28	17	0	12	59.04
United States	Kenna Ponzio	6	1	0–1	68	26	31	16	1	15	51.38
Japan	Kaito Fujii	5	2	1–0	64	26	27	17	2	11	39.53
Sweden	Vilmer Nygren	5	2	0–1	55	42	27	19	5	10	58.05
Norway	Alexander Johansen	3	4	–	49	39	25	19	2	11	65.33
Turkey	Muhammed Taha Zenit	2	5	–	41	40	16	26	5	5	82.17
New Zealand	Jed Nevill	1	6	–	27	44	18	23	3	6	86.52
Nigeria	Goodnews Charles	0	7	–	6	133	4	39	1	0	199.60

Round robin

Draw 1

Saturday, January 20, 10:00

Sheet C	1	2	3	4	5	6	7	8	Final
Turkey (Zenit)	0	1	0	0	1	0	0	X	2
China (Li)	1	0	1	0	0	3	1	X	6

Draw 2

Saturday, January 20, 18:00

Sheet A	1	2	3	4	5	6	7	8	Final
Nigeria (Charles)	0	0	0	0	0	2	X	X	2
Turkey (Zenit)	8	2	3	4	5	0	X	X	22

Draw 3

Sunday, January 21, 14:00

Sheet D	1	2	3	4	5	6	7	8	Final
United States (Ponzio)	1	0	2	3	2	0	X	X	8
Turkey (Zenit)	0	1	0	0	0	1	X	X	2

Draw 4

Monday, January 22, 10:00

Sheet C	1	2	3	4	5	6	7	8	9	Final
Sweden (Nygren)	2	0	3	1	0	0	1	0	1	8
Turkey (Zenit)	0	1	0	0	3	0	0	3	0	7

Draw 5

Monday, January 22, 18:00

Sheet B	1	2	3	4	5	6	7	8	Final
Turkey (Zenit)	0	0	0	0	0	0	0	X	0
Norway (Johansen)	0	2	0	0	1	1	1	X	5

Draw 6

Tuesday, January 23, 14:00

Sheet A	1	2	3	4	5	6	7	8	Final
Turkey (Zenit)	0	0	0	0	2	0	0	X	2
Japan (Fujii)	1	3	0	1	0	1	2	X	8

Draw 7

Wednesday, January 24, 9:00

Sheet B	1	2	3	4	5	6	7	8	Final
New Zealand (Nevill)	0	0	1	1	1	0	0	X	3
Turkey (Zenit)	0	4	0	0	0	1	1	X	6

=== Mixed doubles ===
Group C	W	L	W–L	DSC
China	5	0	–	56.80
Japan	4	1	–	38.84
Latvia	3	2	–	77.39
Turkey	2	3	–	89.37
New Zealand	1	4	–	94.80
Brazil	0	5	–	112.92

Round robin

Draw 4

Saturday, January 27, 18:00

Sheet B	1	2	3	4	5	6	7	8	Final
Latvia (Regža / Zass)	1	1	0	4	2	2	X	X	10
Turkey (Ekmekçi / Aybar)	0	0	1	0	0	0	X	X	1

Draw 5

Sunday, January 28, 10:00

Sheet A	1	2	3	4	5	6	7	8	Final
Turkey (Ekmekçi / Aybar)	3	0	0	1	1	0	1	X	6
New Zealand (Russell / Nevill)	0	1	1	0	0	1	0	X	3

Draw 8

Monday, January 29, 10:00

Sheet D	1	2	3	4	5	6	7	8	Final
Turkey (Ekmekçi / Aybar)	0	0	1	1	1	2	0	X	5
Japan (Tanaka / Kawai)	3	2	0	0	0	0	4	X	9

Draw 13

Tuesday, January 30, 18:00

Sheet C	1	2	3	4	5	6	7	8	Final
China (Gong / Xu)	5	0	2	2	0	4	X	X	13
Turkey (Ekmekçi / Aybar)	0	2	0	0	2	0	X	X	4

Draw 15

Wednesday, January 31, 12:30

Sheet A	1	2	3	4	5	6	7	8	Final
Brazil (Gentile / Melo)	0	1	1	0	2	1	0	X	5
Turkey (Ekmekçi / Aybar)	3	0	0	3	0	0	4	X	10

== Ice hockey ==
Turkey qualified a team of thirteen ice hockey players for the women's 3-on-3 tournament.

Roster

Turkish-American Ashley Elizabeth Salerno was the team's head coach.

- Fatma Bengisu Açarı
- Melis Arslan
- Melisa Çağdaş
- Ekin Daş
- Eylül Daş – A
- Ece Eraşcı
- Dolunay Beren Erbakan
- Tan Nisan Göksal – C
- Sidre Deniz Hacıosmanoğlu
- Azra Betül Kılaç
- Beray Derin Okut
- Eda Seçen
- Azra Nur Şenyuva – A

=== Women's 3x3 tournament ===
Summary

Key:

- GWS – Game winning shots

Team	Event	Group stage								Semifinal	Final	
Team	Event	Opponent Score	Opponent Score	Opponent Score	Opponent Score	Opponent Score	Opponent Score	Opponent Score	Rank	Opponent Score	Opponent Score	Rank
Türkiye	Women's 3x3 tournament	Italy; L 3–5	Hungary; L 0–18	Netherlands; W 11–2	South Korea; L 1–4	China; L 9–2	Australia; W 10–2	Mexico; W 9–1	5	Did not advance		

Preliminary round

Pos	Team	Pld	W	OTW	OTL	L	GF	GA	GD	Pts	Qualification
1	Hungary	7	7	0	0	0	130	5	+125	21	Semifinals
2	China	7	6	0	0	1	70	25	+45	18	Semifinals
3	South Korea (H)	7	4	1	0	2	48	30	+18	14	Semifinals
4	Italy	7	4	0	1	2	67	31	+36	13	Semifinals
5	Turkey	7	3	0	0	4	36	41	−5	9	
6	Australia	7	2	0	0	5	23	75	−52	6	
7	Mexico	7	1	0	0	6	18	71	−53	3	
8	Netherlands	7	0	0	0	7	5	119	−114	0	

Source: IOC
(H) Host

20 January 2024; 17:30	Italy	5–3 (1–1, 3–1, 1–1)	Turkey	Gangneung Hockey Centre

Game reference
Referees: (Mexico) María Chávez (Ukraine) Anhelina Maifeld

21 January 2024; 13:30	Hungary	18–0 (6–0, 3–0, 9–0)	Turkey	Gangneung Hockey Centre

Game reference
Referees: (Canada) Beatrice Fortin (Malaysia) Mei Wah Wan

21 January 2024; 19:00	Netherlands	2–11 (1–2, 0–7, 1–2)	Turkey	Gangneung Hockey Centre

Game reference
Referees: (Finland) Ilona Silander (Malaysia) Mei Wah Wan

22 January 2024; 12:00	Turkey	1–4 (0–3, 1–0, 0–1)	South Korea	Gangneung Hockey Centre

Game reference
Referees: (Mexico) María Chávez (Malaysia) Wan Mei Wah

22 January 2024; 20:30	China	9–2 (4–1, 4–0, 1–1)	Turkey	Gangneung Hockey Centre

Game reference
Referees: (Mexico) María Chávez (Canada) Beatrice Fortin

23 January 2024; 13:30	Turkey	10–2 (3–1, 2–1, 5–0)	Australia	Gangneung Hockey Centre

Game reference
Referees: (Canada) Beatrice Fortin (Ukraine) Anhelina Maifeld

23 January 2024; 19:00	Turkey	9–1 (3–0, 5–0, 1–1)	Mexico	Gangneung Hockey Centre

Game reference
Referees: (Ukraine) Anhelina Maifeld (Finland) Ilona Silander

== Short track speed skating ==
Turkey qualified two male short track speed skaters.

Men

Athlete	Event	Heats		Quarterfinal		Semifinal		Final	
Athlete	Event	Time	Rank	Time	Rank	Time	Rank	Time	Rank
Muhammed Bozdağ	500 m	42.220	2 Q	41.902	3 q	42.329	4 FB	42.915	8
Muhammed Bozdağ	1000 m	1:30.409	2 Q	1:27.592	3 q	1:26.121	3 FA	1:26.349	2nd place, silver medalist(s)
Muhammed Bozdağ	1500 m	—		2:31.583	1 Q	2:33.268	2 FA	2:24.442	7
Toprak Efe Eroğlu	500 m	43.667	3	Did not advance					
Toprak Efe Eroğlu	1000 m	1:39.770	3	Did not advance					
Toprak Efe Eroğlu	1500 m	—		2:32.997	2 Q	2:34.148	4 FB	2:41.499	9

== See also ==
- Turkey at the 2024 Summer Olympics
