= Freestyle skiing at the 2024 Winter Youth Olympics – Women's halfpipe =

Women's slopestyle at the IV Winter Youth Olympic Games
- Venue: Welli Hilli Park
- Dates: 31 January
- Competitors: 6 from 4 nations

Medalists
| 1st place, gold medalist(s) | | Liu Yishan | China |
| 2nd place, silver medalist(s) | | Chen Zihan | China |
| 3rd place, bronze medalist(s) | | Kathryn Gray | United States |

The women's halfpipe event in freestyle skiing at the 2024 Winter Youth Olympics took place on 31 January at the Welli Hilli Park.

== Qualification ==
The qualification was started at 10:15.

| Rank | Bib | Name | Country | Run 1 | Run 2 | Best | Notes |
|---|---|---|---|---|---|---|---|
| 1 | 4 | Chen Zihan | China | 74.25 | 89.00 | 89.00 | Q |
| 2 | 1 | Liu Yishan | China | 86.75 | 83.25 | 86.75 | Q |
| 3 | 2 | Kathryn Gray | United States | 81.50 | 24.50 | 81.50 | Q |
| 4 | 3 | Piper Arnold | United States | 64.25 | 66.50 | 66.50 | Q |
| 5 | 5 | Grete-Mia Meentalo | Estonia | 60.25 | 59.75 | 60.25 | Q |
| 6 | 6 | Lee So-young | South Korea | 31.25 | 32.00 | 32.00 | Q |

== Final ==
The final was started at 13:30.

| Rank | Bib | Name | Country | Run 1 | Run 2 | Run 3 | Best |
|---|---|---|---|---|---|---|---|
| 1st place, gold medalist(s) | 1 | Liu Yishan | China | 89.75 | 92.25 | 86.50 | 92.25 |
| 2nd place, silver medalist(s) | 4 | Chen Zihan | China | 83.75 | 77.00 | 24.50 | 83.75 |
| 3rd place, bronze medalist(s) | 2 | Kathryn Gray | United States | 75.00 | 78.75 | 79.25 | 79.25 |
| 4 | 3 | Piper Arnold | United States | 60.75 | 58.75 | 60.00 | 60.75 |
| 5 | 5 | Grete-Mia Meentalo | Estonia | 53.50 | 21.75 | 55.50 | 55.50 |
| 6 | 6 | Lee So-young | South Korea | 18.25 | 20.25 | 19.00 | 20.25 |
