= Freestyle skiing at the 2024 Winter Youth Olympics – Mixed team dual moguls =

Mixed team dual moguls at the IV Winter Youth Olympic Games
- Venue: High1 Resort
- Dates: 26 January
- Competitors: 30 from 11 nations

Medalists
1st place, gold medalist(s)		Elizabeth Lemley; Porter Huff	United States
2nd place, silver medalist(s)		Yun Shin-ee; Lee Yoon-seung	South Korea
3rd place, bronze medalist(s)		Abby McLarnon; Jiah Cohen	United States

The mixed team dual moguls event in freestyle skiing at the 2024 Winter Youth Olympics took place on 26 January at the Welli Hilli Park.

== Results ==
The tournament was started at 13:00.

1/8 Finals
9	Citrine Boychuk (CAN); Jérémy Sauvageau (CAN)	39
8	Olivia Hedberg (SWE); Elis Moberg (SWE)	31
5	Hikaru Sakai (JPN); Takuto Nakamura (JPN)	42
12	Nova Nilsson (SWE); Noel Gravenfors (SWE)	28
13	Flavie Lamontagne (CAN); Bradley Koehler (CAN)	18.5
4	Lottie Lodge (AUS); Edward Hill (AUS)	51.5
3	Yun Shin-ee (KOR); Lee Yoon-seung (KOR)	60
14	Zuzana Tlapáková (CZE); Vít Zvalený (CZE)	10
11	Moon Seo-young (KOR); Kim Jin-suck (KOR)	36
6	Li Ruilin (CHN); Long Hao (CHN)	34
7	Lily Joly (FRA); Paul Andrea Gay (FRA)	50
10	Yuliya Feklistova (KAZ); Denis Rastruba (KAZ)	20
15	Yuliana Kisil (UKR); Dmytro Perets (UKR)	2
2	Abby McLarnon (USA); Jiah Cohen (USA)	68

Quarterfinals
1	Elizabeth Lemley (USA); Porter Huff (USA)	50
9	Citrine Boychuk (CAN); Jérémy Sauvageau (CAN)	20
5	Hikaru Sakai (JPN); Takuto Nakamura (JPN)	50
4	Lottie Lodge (AUS); Edward Hill (AUS)	20
3	Yun Shin-ee (KOR); Lee Yoon-seung (KOR)	39
11	Moon Seo-young (KOR); Kim Jin-suck (KOR)	21
7	Lily Joly (FRA); Paul Andrea Gay (FRA)	31
2	Abby McLarnon (USA); Jiah Cohen (USA)	39

Semifinals
1	Elizabeth Lemley (USA); Porter Huff (USA)	38
5	Hikaru Sakai (JPN); Takuto Nakamura (JPN)	32
3	Yun Shin-ee (KOR); Lee Yoon-seung (KOR)	35
2	Abby McLarnon (USA); Jiah Cohen (USA)	35

Finals
1	Elizabeth Lemley (USA); Porter Huff (USA)	43
3	Yun Shin-ee (KOR); Lee Yoon-seung (KOR)	27
Third place
5	Hikaru Sakai (JPN); Takuto Nakamura (JPN)	26
2	Abby McLarnon (USA); Jiah Cohen (USA)	44
