= Hungary at the 2024 Winter Youth Olympics =

- Flag of Hungary
- IOC code: HUN
- NOC: Hungarian Olympic Committee

in Gangwon, South Korea 19 January 2024 – 1 February 2024
- Competitors: 33 in 10 sports
- Flag bearer (opening): Balint Barabas & Krisztina Weiler
- Flag bearer (closing): TBD
- Medals Ranked 22nd: Gold 1 Silver 0 Bronze 1 Total 2

Winter Youth Olympics appearances (overview)
- 2012; 2016; 2020; 2024

Hungary is scheduled to compete at the 2024 Winter Youth Olympics in Gangwon, South Korea, from January 19 to February 1, 2024, This will be Hungary's fourth appearance at the Winter Youth Olympic Games, having competed at every Games since the inaugural edition in 2012.

Snowboarder Balint Barabas and ice hockey player Krisztina Weiler were the country's flagbearers during the opening ceremony.

== Competitors ==
The following is the list of number of competitors (per gender) participating at the games per sport/discipline.

| Sport | Men | Women | Total |
|---|---|---|---|
| Alpine skiing | 1 | 1 | 2 |
| Biathlon | 1 | 1 | 2 |
| Cross-country skiing | 1 | 2 | 3 |
| Curling | 1 | 1 | 2 |
| Figure skating | 0 | 1 | 1 |
| Freestyle skiing | 0 | 2 | 2 |
| Ice hockey | 0 | 13 | 13 |
| Short track speed skating | 2 | 2 | 4 |
| Snowboarding | 1 | 1 | 2 |
| Speed skating | 0 | 2 | 2 |
| Total | 7 | 26 | 33 |

== Medalists ==
| Medal | Name | Sport | Event | Date |
|---|---|---|---|---|
| Gold | Hungary women's national under-16 ice hockey team | Ice hockey | Women's 3x3 tournament | 25 January |
| Bronze | Dominik Major | Short track speed skating | Men's 500 metres | 22 January |

== Alpine skiing ==
Hungary qualified two alpine skiers (one per gender).

| Athlete | Event | Run 1 | | Run 2 | | Total | |
| Athlete | Event | Time | Rank | Time | Rank | Time | Rank |
|---|---|---|---|---|---|---|---|
| Milán Schneider | Men's super-G | — | | | | 57.20 | 35 |
| Milán Schneider | Men's giant slalom | 52.20 | 33 | Did not finish | | | |
| Milán Schneider | Men's slalom | 50.35 | 33 | 56.68 | 22 | 1:47.03 | 20 |
| Milán Schneider | Men's combined | 55.52 | 15 | 1:02.49 | 32 | 1:58.01 | 28 |
Dóra Körtvélyessy
| Dóra Körtvélyessy | Women's giant slalom | 54.20 | 30 | 56.29 | 23 | 1:50.49 | 24 |
| Dóra Körtvélyessy | Women's slalom | 54.80 | 31 | 53.03 | 23 | 1:47.83 | 23 |

== Biathlon ==
| Athlete | Event | Time | Misses | Rank |
|---|---|---|---|---|
| László Kunos | Men's sprint | 28:46.9 | 5 (4+1) | 89 |
| László Kunos | Men's individual | 56:27.9 | 8 (3+1+1+3) | 89 |
| Laura Bozóki | Women's sprint | 29:00.6 | 7 (5+2) | 81 |
| Laura Bozóki | Women's individual | 47:08.8 | 4 (1+0+2+1) | 70 |
| Laura Bozóki; László Kunos | Single mixed relay | 52:51.2 | 17 (2+15) | 24 |

== Cross-country skiing ==
Hungary qualified three cross-country skiers (one man and two women).

Men

| Athlete | Event | Qualification | | Quarterfinal | | Semifinal | | Final | |
| Athlete | Event | Time | Rank | Time | Rank | Time | Rank | Time | Rank |
|---|---|---|---|---|---|---|---|---|---|
| Martin Holló | 7.5 km classical | — | | | | | | 25:08.1 | 64 |
| Martin Holló | Sprint freestyle | 3:42.51 | 68 | Did not advance | | | | | |

Women

| Athlete | Event | Qualification | | Quarterfinal | | Semifinal | | Final | |
| Athlete | Event | Time | Rank | Time | Rank | Time | Rank | Time | Rank |
|---|---|---|---|---|---|---|---|---|---|
| Larissza Vanda Bere | 7.5 km classical | — | | | | | | 25:47.0 | 41 |
| Larissza Vanda Bere | Sprint freestyle | 3:53.72 | 37 | Did not advance | | | | | |
| Dóra Gaál | 7.5 km classical | — | | | | | | 29:33.5 | 59 |
| Dóra Gaál | Sprint freestyle | 4:21.21 | 60 | Did not advance | | | | | |

== Curling ==
Hungary qualified a mixed doubles pair for a total of two athletes (one per gender).

Summary

| Team | Event | Group Stage | | | | | | Quarterfinal | Semifinal | Final / BM | |
| Team | Event | Opposition Score | Opposition Score | Opposition Score | Opposition Score | Opposition Score | Rank | Opposition Score | Opposition Score | Opposition Score | Rank |
|---|---|---|---|---|---|---|---|---|---|---|---|
| Lola Nagy; Benjamin Kárász | Mixed doubles | Nigeria; W 13–3 | Czech Republic; L 2–7 | Canada; L 5–8 | South Korea; W 7–4 | Great Britain; L 4–8 | 4 | Did not advance | | | 14 |

=== Mixed doubles ===
| Group A | W | L | W–L | DSC |
|---|---|---|---|---|
| Great Britain | 4 | 1 | 1–0 | 40.06 |
| Czech Republic | 4 | 1 | 0–1 | 42.84 |
| Canada | 3 | 2 | – | 54.69 |
| Hungary | 2 | 3 | 1–0 | 89.06 |
| South Korea | 2 | 3 | 0–1 | 38.09 |
| Nigeria | 0 | 5 | – | 168.42 |

Round robin

Draw 1

Friday, January 26, 18:00

| Sheet D | 1 | 2 | 3 | 4 | 5 | 6 | 7 | 8 | Final |
| Nigeria (Akinsanya / Daniel) | 0 | 0 | 2 | 0 | 0 | 0 | 1 | X | 3 |
| Hungary (Nagy / Kárász) | 4 | 1 | 0 | 5 | 2 | 1 | 0 | X | 13 |

Draw 2

Saturday, January 27, 10:00

| Sheet B | 1 | 2 | 3 | 4 | 5 | 6 | 7 | 8 | Final |
| Czech Republic (Zelingrová / Bláha) | 1 | 1 | 1 | 0 | 2 | 0 | 1 | 1 | 7 |
| Hungary (Nagy / Kárász) | 0 | 0 | 0 | 1 | 0 | 1 | 0 | 0 | 2 |

Draw 7

Sunday, January 28, 18:00

| Sheet B | 1 | 2 | 3 | 4 | 5 | 6 | 7 | 8 | Final |
| Hungary (Nagy / Kárász) | 0 | 0 | 1 | 0 | 1 | 0 | 3 | X | 5 |
| Canada (Locke / Perry) | 2 | 1 | 0 | 4 | 0 | 1 | 0 | X | 8 |

Draw 9

Monday, January 29, 14:00

| Sheet C | 1 | 2 | 3 | 4 | 5 | 6 | 7 | 8 | Final |
| Hungary (Nagy / Kárász) | 1 | 2 | 1 | 0 | 2 | 0 | 0 | 1 | 7 |
| South Korea (Lee / Lee) | 0 | 0 | 0 | 1 | 0 | 1 | 2 | 0 | 4 |

Draw 11

Tuesday, January 30, 10:00

| Sheet A | 1 | 2 | 3 | 4 | 5 | 6 | 7 | 8 | Final |
| Great Britain (Soutar / Brewster) | 4 | 0 | 2 | 1 | 0 | 1 | 0 | X | 8 |
| Hungary (Nagy / Kárász) | 0 | 1 | 0 | 0 | 2 | 0 | 1 | X | 4 |

== Figure skating ==
| Athlete | Event | SP | | FS | | Total | |
| Athlete | Event | Points | Rank | Points | Rank | Points | Rank |
|---|---|---|---|---|---|---|---|
| Léna Ekker | Women's singles | 44.93 | 15 | 90.83 | 14 | 135.76 | 14 |

== Freestyle skiing ==
Ski cross

| Athlete | Event | Group heats | | Semifinal | Final |
| Athlete | Event | Points | Rank | Position | Position |
|---|---|---|---|---|---|
| Fanni Szeghalmi | Women's ski cross | 16 | 5 | Did not advance | |
| Dóra Tymcyna | Women's ski cross | 9 | 11 | Did not advance | |

== Ice hockey ==
Hungary qualified a team of thirteen ice hockey players for the women's 3-on-3 tournament.

Roster

Canadian Delaney Collins is the team's head coach.

- Boróka Bátyi
- Dóra Bereczki
- Csenge Noémi Csordás
- Luca Faragó
- Lili Hajdu
- Lorina Haraszt
- Réka Effi Hiezl – A
- Petra Polónyi – A
- Lara Sághy
- Bíborka Borbála Simon
- Bonita Lilla Szabó
- Noémi Zoé Takács
- Krisztina Weiler – C

=== Women's 3x3 tournament ===
Summary

Key:

- GWS – Game winning shots

| Team | Event | Group stage | | | | | | | | Semifinal | Final | |
| Team | Event | Opponent Score | Opponent Score | Opponent Score | Opponent Score | Opponent Score | Opponent Score | Opponent Score | Rank | Opponent Score | Opponent Score | Rank |
|---|---|---|---|---|---|---|---|---|---|---|---|---|
| Hungary | Women's 3x3 tournament | Mexico; W 17–0 | Turkey; W 18–0 | China; W 13–3 | Australia; W 22–1 | Netherlands; W 33–0 | South Korea; W 16–0 | Italy; W 11–1 | 1 | Italy; W 14–4 | South Korea; W 10–2 | 1st place, gold medalist(s) |

Preliminary round

| Pos | Team | Pld | W | OTW | OTL | L | GF | GA | GD | Pts | Qualification |
|---|---|---|---|---|---|---|---|---|---|---|---|
| 1 | Hungary | 7 | 7 | 0 | 0 | 0 | 130 | 5 | +125 | 21 | Semifinals |
| 2 | China | 7 | 6 | 0 | 0 | 1 | 70 | 25 | +45 | 18 | Semifinals |
| 3 | South Korea (H) | 7 | 4 | 1 | 0 | 2 | 48 | 30 | +18 | 14 | Semifinals |
| 4 | Italy | 7 | 4 | 0 | 1 | 2 | 67 | 31 | +36 | 13 | Semifinals |
| 5 | Turkey | 7 | 3 | 0 | 0 | 4 | 36 | 41 | −5 | 9 | |
| 6 | Australia | 7 | 2 | 0 | 0 | 5 | 23 | 75 | −52 | 6 | |
| 7 | Mexico | 7 | 1 | 0 | 0 | 6 | 18 | 71 | −53 | 3 | |
| 8 | Netherlands | 7 | 0 | 0 | 0 | 7 | 5 | 119 | −114 | 0 | |

Source: IOC
(H) Host

| 20 January 2024; 17:30 | Mexico | 0–17 (0–5, 0–3, 0–9) | Hungary | Gangneung Hockey Centre |

Game reference
| Referees: (Finland) Ilona Silander (Malaysia) Mei Wah Wan |

| 21 January 2024; 13:30 | Hungary | 18–0 (6–0, 3–0, 9–0) | Turkey | Gangneung Hockey Centre |

Game reference
| Referees: (Canada) Beatrice Fortin (Malaysia) Mei Wah Wan |

| 21 January 2024; 19:00 | Hungary | 13–3 (3–0, 3–2, 7–1) | China | Gangneung Hockey Centre |

Game reference

Referees:
(Mexico) María Chávez
(Canada) Beatrice Fortin

| PP | 1–0 |
| PP | 2–0 |
| EQ | 3–0 |
| EQ | 4–0 |
| EQ | 5–0 |
| | 5–1 | SH |
| EQ | 6–1 |
| | 6–2 | EQ |
| EQ | 7–2 |
| PP | 8–2 |
| PP | 9–2 |
| PP | 10–2 |
| PP | 11–2 |
| EQ | 12–2 |
| EQ | 13–2 |
| | 13–3 | PP |

| 22 January 2024; 12:00 | Australia | 1–22 (0–5, 0–8, 1–9) | Hungary | Gangneung Hockey Centre |

Game reference
| Referees: (Canada) Beatrice Fortin (Finland) Ilona Silander |

| 22 January 2024; 20:30 | Hungary | 33–0 (10–0, 14–0, 9–0) | Netherlands | Gangneung Hockey Centre |

Game reference
| Referees: (Canada) Domenica Maurer (Malaysia) Wan Mei Wah |

| 23 January 2024; 13:30 | South Korea | 0–16 (0–7, 0–5, 0–4) | Hungary | Gangneung Hockey Centre |

Game reference
| Referees: (Mexico) María Chávez (Malaysia) Wan Mei Wah |

| 23 January 2024; 19:00 | Hungary | 11–1 (2–0, 4–1, 5–0) | Italy | Gangneung Hockey Centre |

Game reference
| Referees: (Canada) Beatrice Fortin (Malaysia) Wan Mei Wah |

Semifinal

| 24 January 2024; 12:00 | Hungary | 14–4 (6–0, 5–2, 3–2) | Italy | Gangneung Hockey Centre |

Game reference
| Referees: (Canada) Beatrice Fortin (Finland) Ilona Silander |

Final

| 25 January 2024; 14:00 | Hungary | 10–2 (2–0, 5–1, 3–1) | South Korea | Gangneung Hockey Centre |

Game reference
| Referees: (Canada) Beatrice Fortin (Ukraine) Anhelina Maifeld |

== Short track speed skating ==
Hungary qualified four short track speed skaters (two per gender).

Men

| Athlete | Event | Heats | | Quarterfinal | | Semifinal | | Final | |
| Athlete | Event | Time | Rank | Time | Rank | Time | Rank | Time | Rank |
|---|---|---|---|---|---|---|---|---|---|
| Dávid Keszthelyi | 500 m | Penalty | | Did not advance | | | | | |
| Dávid Keszthelyi | 1000 m | 2:00.035 | 4 | Did not advance | | | | | 35 |
| Dávid Keszthelyi | 1500 m | — | | 2:22.790 | 4 q | 2:28.840 | 7 | Did not advance | 20 |
| Dominik Major | 500 m | 42.409 | 1 Q | 42.077 | 1 Q | 42.213 | 3 FA | 41.969 | 3rd place, bronze medalist(s) |
| Dominik Major | 1000 m | 1:38.237 | 1 Q | 1:29.951 | 2 Q | 1:33.309 | 4 FB | 1:29.674 | 6 |
| Dominik Major | 1500 m | — | | 2:20.938 | 2 Q | 2:22.613 | 4 FB | 2:44.837 | 12 |

Women

| Athlete | Event | Heats | | Quarterfinal | | Semifinal | | Final | |
| Athlete | Event | Time | Rank | Time | Rank | Time | Rank | Time | Rank |
|---|---|---|---|---|---|---|---|---|---|
| Dóra Szigeti | 500 m | 45.216 | 1 Q | 44.401 | 2 Q | 44.306 | 1 FA | 1:07.592 | 5 |
| Dóra Szigeti | 1000 m | 1:39.192 | 2 Q | 1:36.527 | 3 | Did not advance | | | 12 |
| Dóra Szigeti | 1500 m | — | | 2:38.540 | 2 Q | 3:12.408 | 6 ADVA | 2:42.954 | 5 |
| Diána Végi | 500 m | 44.585 | 2 Q | 45.030 | 2 Q | 44.664 | 3 FB | 45.932 | 8 |
| Diána Végi | 1000 m | 1:36.259 | 1 Q | 1:32.552 | 2 Q | 1:32.921 | 3 FB | 1:32.509 | 8 |
| Diána Végi | 1500 m | — | | 2:33.577 | 1 Q | 2:25.683 | 1 FA | 2:45.818 | 4 |

Mixed

| Athlete | Event | Semifinal | | Final | |
| Athlete | Event | Time | Rank | Time | Rank |
|---|---|---|---|---|---|
| Dávid Keszthelyi; Dominik Major; Dóra Szigeti; Diána Végi | Mixed relay | 2:58.201 | 3 QB | 2:54.403 | 7 |

== Snowboarding ==
Snowboard cross

| Athlete | Event | Group stage | | Semifinal | Final |
| Athlete | Event | Points | Rank | Position | Position |
|---|---|---|---|---|---|
| Bálint Barabás | Men's snowboard cross | 7 | 14 | Did not advance | |

== Speed skating ==
Hungary qualified two female speed skaters.

Women

| Athlete | Event | Time | Rank |
|---|---|---|---|
| Lilla Sándor | 500 m | 44.29 | 29 |
| Lilla Sándor | 1500 m | 2:24.17 | 29 |
| Rebeka Vancsó | 500 m | 42.66 | 19 |
| Rebeka Vancsó | 1500 m | 2:22.06 | 28 |

Mass Start

| Athlete | Event | Semifinal | | | Final | | |
| Athlete | Event | Points | Time | Rank | Points | Time | Rank |
|---|---|---|---|---|---|---|---|
| Lilla Sándor | Women's mass start | 0 | 6:28.29 | 11 | Did not advance | | |
| Rebeka Vancsó | Women's mass start | 0 | 6:09.70 | 14 | Did not advance | | |

== See also ==
- Hungary at the 2024 Summer Olympics
