= Mexico at the 2024 Winter Youth Olympics =

- Flag of Mexico
- IOC code: MEX
- NOC: Mexican Olympic Committee

in Gangwon, South Korea 19 January 2024 – 1 February 2024
- Competitors: 13 in 1 sport
- Flag bearer (opening): Ana Sofía Soto Borja
- Flag bearer (closing): TBD
- Medals: Gold 0 Silver 0 Bronze 0 Total 0

Winter Youth Olympics appearances (overview)
- 2012; 2016; 2020; 2024

Mexico competed at the 2024 Winter Youth Olympics in Gangwon, South Korea, from 19 January to 1 February 2024. This was Mexico's fourth appearance at the Winter Youth Olympic Games, having competed at every Games since the inaugural edition in 2012.

The Mexican team consisted of thirteen athletes competing in the women's 3x3 ice hockey competition. Ice hockey team captain Ana Sofía Soto Borja was the country's flagbearer during the opening ceremony.

== Competitors ==
The following is the list of number of competitors (per gender) participating at the games per sport/discipline.

Sport	Men	Women	Total
Ice hockey	0	13	13
Total	0	13	13

== Ice hockey ==
Mexico qualified a team of thirteen ice hockey players for the women's 3-on-3 tournament.

Roster

Bertha González Maza and Mónica Rentería Peñafort were co-head coaches of the team.

- Rebeca Andrade
- Camila de la Fuente
- Constanza del Río
- Yaretzi García
- Jade Garduño
- Sofía Hernández
- Tululy Hernández
- Sofia Labastida – A
- Ariadna Lorenzana – A
- Natalia Molinar
- Diana Pérez
- Natalia Salinas
- Ana Sofía Soto Borja – C

=== Women's 3x3 tournament ===
Summary

Key:

- GWS – Game winning shots

Team	Event	Group stage								Semifinal	Final	
Team	Event	Opponent Score	Opponent Score	Opponent Score	Opponent Score	Opponent Score	Opponent Score	Opponent Score	Rank	Opponent Score	Opponent Score	Rank
Mexico	Women's 3x3 tournament	Hungary; L 0–14	Netherlands; W 9–2	South Korea; L 0–7	Italy; L 3–11	Australia; L 4–5	China; L 1–20	Turkey; L 1–9	7	Did not advance		7

Preliminary round

Pos	Team	Pld	W	OTW	OTL	L	GF	GA	GD	Pts	Qualification
1	Hungary	7	7	0	0	0	130	5	+125	21	Semifinals
2	China	7	6	0	0	1	70	25	+45	18	Semifinals
3	South Korea (H)	7	4	1	0	2	48	30	+18	14	Semifinals
4	Italy	7	4	0	1	2	67	31	+36	13	Semifinals
5	Turkey	7	3	0	0	4	36	41	−5	9	
6	Australia	7	2	0	0	5	23	75	−52	6	
7	Mexico	7	1	0	0	6	18	71	−53	3	
8	Netherlands	7	0	0	0	7	5	119	−114	0	

Source: IOC
(H) Host

20 January 2024; 17:30	Mexico	0–17 (0–5, 0–3, 0–9)	Hungary	Gangneung Hockey Centre

Game reference
Referees: (Finland) Ilona Silander (Malaysia) Mei Wah Wan

21 January 2024; 12:00	Netherlands	2–9 (2–2, 0–4, 0–3)	Mexico	Gangneung Hockey Centre

Game reference
Referees: (Mexico) María Chávez (Canada) Beatrice Fortin

21 January 2024; 20:30	South Korea	7–0 (3–0, 0–0, 4–0)	Mexico	Gangneung Hockey Centre

Game reference
Referees: (Ukraine) Anhelina Maifeld (Finland) Ilona Silander

22 January 2024; 13:30	Italy	11–3 (3–1, 5–1, 3–1)	Mexico	Gangneung Hockey Centre

Game reference
Referees: (Mexico) María Chávez (Finland) Ilona Silander

22 January 2024; 19:00	Mexico	4–5 (0–1, 2–1, 2–3)	Australia	Gangneung Hockey Centre

Game reference
Referees: (Mexico) María Chávez (Ukraine) Anhelina Maifeld

23 January 2024; 12:00	Mexico	1–20 (0–6, 1–6, 0–8)	China	Gangneung Hockey Centre

Game reference
Referees: (Ukraine) Anhelina Maifeld (Malaysia) Wan Mei Wah

23 January 2024; 19:00	Turkey	9–1 (3–0, 5–0, 1–1)	Mexico	Gangneung Hockey Centre

Game reference
Referees: (Ukraine) Anhelina Maifeld (Finland) Ilona Silander

== See also ==
- Mexico at the 2024 Summer Olympics
