= South Korea at the 2024 Winter Youth Olympics =

- Flag of South Korea
- IOC code: KOR
- NOC: Korean Sport & Olympic Committee

in Gangwon, South Korea 19 January 2024 – 1 February 2024
- Competitors: 102 in 14 sports
- Flag bearers (opening): So Jaehwan & Jang Hyeonjeong
- Flag bearer (closing): TBD
- Medals Ranked 3rd: Gold 7 Silver 6 Bronze 4 Total 17

Winter Youth Olympics appearances (overview)
- 2012; 2016; 2020; 2024

South Korea is competed at the 2024 Winter Youth Olympics in Gangwon, South Korea, from 19 January to 1 February 2024. This was South Korea's fourth appearance at the Winter Youth Olympic Games, having competed at every Games since the inaugural edition in 2012. South Korea served as host nation for this edition.

The South Korean delegation was the largest among all 79 participating nations, and comprises 102 athletes competing in 14 sports. Bobsledder So Jaehwan and ice hockey player Jang Hyeonjeong were the country's flagbearers during the opening ceremony.

== Competitors ==
The following is the list of number of competitors (per gender) participating at the games per sport/discipline.

Sport	Men	Women	Total
Alpine skiing	3	3	6
Biathlon	3	3	6
Bobsleigh	1	1	2
Cross-country skiing	3	3	6
Curling	3	3	6
Figure skating	2	3	6
Freestyle skiing	8	3	11
Ice hockey	18	13	31
Luge	3	2	5
Short track speed skating	2	2	4
Skeleton	1	2	3
Ski jumping	2	0	2
Snowboarding	6	5	11
Speed skating	2	2	4
Total	57	45	102

== Medalists ==
Medal	Name	Sport	Event	Date
Gold	Joo Jae-hee	Short track speed skating	Men's 1500 metres	20 January
Gold	So Jae-hwan	Bobsleigh	Men's monobob	23 January
Gold	Lee Chae-un	Snowboarding	Men's slopestyle	25 January
Gold	Lee Yoon-seung	Freestyle skiing	Men's dual moguls	27 January
Gold	Kim Hyun-gyeom	Figure skating	Men's singles	29 January
Gold	Kim Hyun-gyeom; Kim Jin-ny; Lee Na-mu; Shin Ji-a	Figure skating	Team event	1 February
Gold	Lee Chae-un	Snowboarding	Men's halfpipe	1 February
Silver	Kang Min-ji	Short track speed skating	Women's 500 metres	22 January
Silver	Jung Hui-dan	Speed skating	Women's 500 metres	22 January
Silver	Lim Jee-won; Heo Se-ok	Speed skating	Mixed relay	25 January
Silver	South Korea women's national under-16 ice hockey team	Ice hockey	Women's 3x3 tournament	25 January
Silver	Yun Shin-ee; Lee Yoon-seung	Freestyle skiing	Mixed team dual moguls	26 January
Silver	Shin Ji-a	Figure skating	Women's singles	29 January
Bronze	Kim You-sung	Short track speed skating	Men's 1500 metres	20 January
Bronze	Shin Seo-nung	Speed skating	Men's 500 metres	22 January
Bronze	Chung Jae-hee	Short track speed skating	Women's 500 metres	22 January
Bronze	Shin Yeon-su	Skeleton	Men's	23 January

== Alpine skiing ==
South Korea, as host nation qualified six alpine skiers (three per gender) automatically.

Men

Athlete	Event	Run 1		Run 2		Total	
Athlete	Event	Time	Rank	Time	Rank	Time	Rank
Kim Joo-hyoun	Super-G	—N/a				58.21	40
Kim Joo-hyoun	Giant slalom	52.50	36	48.12	25	1:40.62	26
Kim Joo-hyoun	Slalom	49.61	26	DNF			
Kim Joo-hyoun	Combined	DNF					
Kim Se-hyun	Super-G	—N/a				57.35	37
Kim Se-hyun	Giant slalom	51.22	23	47.43	20	1:38.65	20
Kim Se-hyun	Slalom	DNF					
Kim Se-hyun	Combined	58.29	40	DNF			
Lee Hyun-ho	Super-G	DNF					
Lee Hyun-ho	Giant slalom	52.68	38	48.45	28	1:41.13	28
Lee Hyun-ho	Slalom	52.11	42	DNF			
Lee Hyun-ho	Combined	59.22	45	1:00.86	28	2:00.08	30

Women

Athlete	Event	Run 1		Run 2		Total	
Athlete	Event	Time	Rank	Time	Rank	Time	Rank
Choi Ye-rin	Super-G	—N/a				59.24	42
Choi Ye-rin	Giant slalom	DQ					
Choi Ye-rin	Slalom	55.47	35	53.66	26	1:49.13	26
Choi Ye-rin	Combined	1:01.73	44	1:01.34	31	2:03.07	30
Chung Seung-yeon	Super-G	—N/a				59.44	43
Chung Seung-yeon	Giant slalom	56.66	40	1:01.12	32	1:57.78	32
Chung Seung-yeon	Slalom	1:05.21	54	1:00.24	36	2:05.45	38
Chung Seung-yeon	Combined	1:02.09	45	1:04.47	34	2:06.56	32
Lee Na-yae	Super-G	—N/a				1:00.63	44
Lee Na-yae	Giant slalom	53.23	26	56.09	20	1:49.32	21
Lee Na-yae	Slalom	57.78	45	55.52	33	1:53.30	34
Lee Na-yae	Combined	1:02.63	46	DNF			

Mixed

Athlete	Event	Round of 16	Quarterfinals	Semifinals	Final / BM	
Athlete	Event	Opposition Result	Opposition Result	Opposition Result	Opposition Result	Rank
Lee Na-yae; Kim Se-hyun	Parallel mixed team	Switzerland; L 1–3	Did not advance			

== Biathlon ==
South Korea, as host nation, qualified six biathletes (three per gender).

Men

Athlete	Event	Time	Misses	Rank
Cho Na-dan	Sprint	23:45.3	2 (2+0)	28
Cho Na-dan	Individual	45:40.3	2 (1+0+1+0)	20
Hwang Tae-ryeong	Sprint	25:08.9	3 (2+1)	59
Hwang Tae-ryeong	Individual	54:35.2	8 (1+2+1+4)	84
Park Min-yong	Sprint	24:22.2	2 (1+1)	41
Park Min-yong	Individual	51:37.9	8 (2+1+1+4)	68

Women

Athlete	Event	Time	Misses	Rank
Kim Hye-won	Sprint	24:16.6	4 (2+2)	47
Kim Hye-won	Individual	43:49.1	3 (1+1+0+1)	41
Kim Min-ji	Sprint	26:34.2	6 (4+2)	70
Kim Min-ji	Individual	47:56.3	9 (2+3+2+2)	76
Lee Ju-hee	Sprint	40:06.3	10 (5+5)	92
Lee Ju-hee	Individual	46:30.5	4 (0+3+0+1)	64

Mixed

Athletes	Event	Time	Misses	Rank
Kim Hye-won; Cho Na-dan	Single mixed relay	50:06.5	11 (1+10)	19
Kim Hye-won; Kim Min-ji; Cho Na-dan; Park Min-yong	Mixed relay	1:26:20.3	20 (4+16)	15

== Bobsleigh ==
Athlete	Event	Run 1		Run 2		Total	
Athlete	Event	Time	Rank	Time	Rank	Time	Rank
So Jae-hwan	Men's	53.80	1	54.83	2	1:48.63	1st place, gold medalist(s)
Choi Si-yeon	Women's	57.30	7	57.92	7	1:55.22	7

== Cross-country skiing ==
South Korea, as host nation qualified six cross-country skiers (three per gender).

Men

Athlete	Event	Qualification		Quarterfinal		Semifinal		Final	
Athlete	Event	Time	Rank	Time	Rank	Time	Rank	Time	Rank
Kim Ga-on	7.5 km classical	—N/a						22:53.4	49
Kim Ga-on	Sprint freestyle	3:23.44	47	Did not advance					
Kim Woo-suk	7.5 km classical	—N/a						24:17.7	57
Kim Woo-suk	Sprint freestyle	3:27.29	52	Did not advance					
Song Chan-min	7.5 km classical	—N/a						23:39.0	54
Song Chan-min	Sprint freestyle	3:33.79	59	Did not advance					

Women

Athlete	Event	Qualification		Quarterfinal		Semifinal		Final	
Athlete	Event	Time	Rank	Time	Rank	Time	Rank	Time	Rank
Heo Bu-gyeong	7.5 km classical	—N/a						26:53.6	48
Heo Bu-gyeong	Sprint freestyle	4:08.78	51	Did not advance					
Kang Han-eul	7.5 km classical	—N/a						29:12.2	57
Kang Han-eul	Sprint freestyle	4:18.92	58	Did not advance					
Yu Da-yeon	7.5 km classical	—N/a						30:05.7	62
Yu Da-yeon	Sprint freestyle	4:41.96	68	Did not advance					

Mixed

Athlete	Event	Time	Rank
Heo Bu-gyeong; Kim Ga-on; Kang Han-eul; Kim Woo-suk	Mixed relay	1:02:00.1	20

== Curling ==
South Korea as host nation, automatically qualified a mixed team and mixed doubles pair for a total of six athletes.

Summary

Team	Event	Group Stage								Quarterfinal	Semifinal	Final / BM	
Team	Event	Opposition Score	Opposition Score	Opposition Score	Opposition Score	Opposition Score	Opposition Score	Opposition Score	Rank	Opposition Score	Opposition Score	Opposition Score	Rank
Kim Dae-hyun; Lee So-won; Kwon Juni; Jang Yu-bin	Mixed team	Brazil; W 17–1	Italy; L 5–6	Switzerland; L 4–8	Great Britain; L 2–3	Denmark; W 5–4	Canada; W 9–7	Germany; W 6–4	5	Did not advance			10
Lee Chae-won; Lee Ji-hun	Mixed doubles	Canada; L 5–9	Great Britain; W 11–2	Hungary; L 4–7	Nigeria; W 17–1	Czech Republic; L 5–7	—N/a		5	Did not advance			17

=== Mixed tournament ===
Group B	Skip	W	L	W–L	PF	PA	EW	EL	BE	SE	DSC
Great Britain	Logan Carson	6	1	–	44	30	26	21	4	7	51.75
Denmark	Jacob Schmidt	5	2	–	48	28	27	20	2	9	34.70
Switzerland	Nathan Dryburgh	4	3	2–0	52	35	25	23	5	7	39.96
Italy	Andrea Gilli	4	3	1–1	46	38	29	23	3	7	50.58
South Korea	Kim Dae-hyun	4	3	0–2	48	33	24	22	3	8	109.88
Canada	Nathan Gray	3	4	–	40	34	24	20	3	11	35.43
Brazil	Pedro Ribeiro	1	6	1–0	17	81	13	31	0	2	103.39
Germany	Lukas Jäger	1	6	0–1	30	46	19	27	2	5	68.51

Round robin

Draw 1

Saturday, January 20, 14:00

Sheet A	1	2	3	4	5	6	7	8	Final
Brazil (Ribeiro)	0	0	0	0	0	1	X	X	1
South Korea (Kim) 🔨	6	1	3	6	1	0	X	X	17

Draw 2

Sunday, January 21, 10:00

Sheet B	1	2	3	4	5	6	7	8	9	Final
South Korea (Kim)	0	1	0	0	3	0	1	0	0	5
Italy (Gilli) 🔨	1	0	0	2	0	1	0	1	1	6

Draw 3

Sunday, January 21, 18:00

Sheet C	1	2	3	4	5	6	7	8	Final
Switzerland (Dryburgh) 🔨	0	1	2	0	1	0	2	2	8
South Korea (Kim)	0	0	0	2	0	2	0	0	4

Draw 4

Monday, January 22, 14:00

Sheet D	1	2	3	4	5	6	7	8	Final
Great Britain (Carson) 🔨	1	0	0	0	0	1	0	1	3
South Korea (Kim)	0	0	1	0	0	0	1	0	2

Draw 5

Tuesday, January 23, 10:00

Sheet B	1	2	3	4	5	6	7	8	Final
Denmark (Schmidt) 🔨	0	2	0	0	1	0	1	0	4
South Korea (Kim)	1	0	0	1	0	1	0	2	5

Draw 6

Tuesday, January 23, 18:00

Sheet D	1	2	3	4	5	6	7	8	Final
South Korea (Kim)	0	2	0	0	3	2	0	2	9
Canada (Gray) 🔨	2	0	2	0	0	0	3	0	7

Draw 7

Wednesday, January 24, 13:00

Sheet C	1	2	3	4	5	6	7	8	Final
South Korea (Kim)	2	0	2	0	0	1	1	X	6
Germany (Jäger) 🔨	0	3	0	0	1	0	0	X	4

=== Mixed doubles ===
Group A	W	L	W–L	DSC
Great Britain	4	1	1–0	40.06
Czech Republic	4	1	0–1	42.84
Canada	3	2	–	54.69
Hungary	2	3	1–0	89.06
South Korea	2	3	0–1	38.09
Nigeria	0	5	–	168.42

Round robin

Draw 2

Saturday, January 27, 10:00

Sheet A	1	2	3	4	5	6	7	8	Final
Canada (Locke / Perry) 🔨	3	2	0	3	0	1	0	X	9
South Korea (Lee / Lee)	0	0	1	0	1	0	3	X	5

Draw 7

Sunday, January 28, 18:00

Sheet C	1	2	3	4	5	6	7	8	Final
South Korea (Lee / Lee) 🔨	1	2	2	1	0	3	2	X	11
Great Britain (Soutar / Brewster)	0	0	0	0	2	0	0	X	2

Draw 9

Monday, January 29, 14:00

Sheet C	1	2	3	4	5	6	7	8	Final
Hungary (Nagy / Kárász)	1	2	1	0	2	0	0	1	7
South Korea (Lee / Lee) 🔨	0	0	0	1	0	1	2	0	4

Draw 11

Tuesday, January 30, 10:00

Sheet B	1	2	3	4	5	6	7	8	Final
South Korea (Lee / Lee) 🔨	1	3	3	4	0	6	X	X	17
Nigeria (Akinsanya / Daniel)	0	0	0	0	1	0	X	X	1

Draw 14

Wednesday, January 31, 9:00

Sheet D	1	2	3	4	5	6	7	8	Final
Czech Republic (Zelingrová / Bláha)	2	2	0	0	2	0	0	1	7
South Korea (Lee / Lee) 🔨	0	0	1	1	0	1	2	0	5

== Figure skating ==
Athlete	Event	SP/SD		FS/FD		Total	
Athlete	Event	Points	Rank	Points	Rank	Points	Rank
Kim Hyun-gyeom	Men's singles	69.28	3	147.45	1	216.73	1st place, gold medalist(s)
Kim Yu-seong	Women's singles	63.64	4	117.89	4	181.53	4
Shin Ji-a	Women's singles	66.48	3	125.35	2	191.83	2nd place, silver medalist(s)
Kim Jin-ny; Lee Na-mu	Ice dance	56.58	3	82.82	5	139.40	4

Team event

Athlete	Event	Free skate / Free dance				Total	
Athlete	Event	Men's	Women's	Pairs	Ice dance	Points	Rank
Athlete	Event	Points Team points	Points Team points	Points Team points	Points Team points	Points	Rank
Kim Hyun-gyeom (M); Shin Ji-a (W); Kim Jin-ny / Lee Na-mu (ID)	Team event	136.38; 5	137.48; 5	~~0~~	82.15; 3	13	1st place, gold medalist(s)

== Freestyle skiing ==
Dual moguls
Individual

Athlete	Event	Group Stage						Semifinals	Final / BM	
Athlete	Event	Opposition Result	Opposition Result	Opposition Result	Opposition Result	Points	Rank	Opposition Result	Opposition Result	Rank
Kim Jin-suck	Men's dual moguls	Nakamura (JPN); L 2–3	Dooley (IRL); W 3–2	Hill (AUS); L 2–3	Koehler (CAN); L 2–3	9	4	Did not advance		
Lee Yoon-seung	Men's dual moguls	Rastruba (KAZ); W' 3–2	Sauvageau (CAN); W 3–2	Buzzi (SUI); W 3–2	Perets (UKR); W 3–2	12	1 Q	Cohen (USA); W 20–15	Huff (USA); W 18–17	1st place, gold medalist(s)
Moon Seo-young	Women's dual moguls	Frankel (THA); W 3–2	Taguchi (JPN); W 3–DNS	Li (CHN); W 3–DNF	Passaretta (ITA); L 2–3	11	2	Did not advance		
Yun Shin-Ee	Women's dual moguls	Lemley (USA); L 2–3	Hedberg (SWE); L 2–3	Lamontagne (CAN); L 2–3	Nilsson (SWE); W 3–2	9	4	Did not advance		

Team

Athlete	Event	Round of 16	Quarterfinals	Semifinals	Final / BM	
Athlete	Event	Opposition Result	Opposition Result	Opposition Result	Opposition Result	Rank
Moon Seo-young; Kim Jin-suck	Mixed team	Li / Long (CHN); W 36–34	Yun / Lee (KOR); L 31–39	Did not advance		
Yun Shin-Ee; Lee Yoon-seung	Mixed team	Tlapáková / Zvalený (CZE); W 60–10	Moon / Kim (KOR); W 39–31	McLarnon / Cohen (USA); W 35–35	Lemley / Huff (USA); L 27–43	2nd place, silver medalist(s)

Ski cross
Individual

Athlete	Event	Group heats		Semifinal	Final
Athlete	Event	Points	Rank	Position	Position
Lee Jeong-min	Men's ski cross	8	14	Did not advance	
Yu Ho-jun	Men's ski cross	9	12	Did ot advance	

Halfpipe, Slopestyle & Big Air

Athlete	Event	Qualification				Final				
Athlete	Event	Run 1	Run 2	Best	Rank	Run 1	Run 2	Run 3	Best	Rank
Brendon Choi	Men's big air	10.00	11.75	11.75	22	Did not advance				
Brendon Choi	Men's slopestyle	5.25	29.25	29.25	21	Did not advance				
Lee Seo-jun	Men's big air	49.75	16.75	49.75	19	Did not advance				
Lee Seo-jun	Men's slopestyle	54.00	2.00	54.00	15	Did not advance				
Moon Hee-Sung	Men's halfpipe	55.50	18.00	55.50	10 Q	43.25	12.25	DNS	43.25	10
Shin Dong-ho	Men's halfpipe	DNS	21.75	21.75	14	Did not advance				
Lee So-young	Women's halfpipe	31.25	32.00	32.00	6	18.25	20.25	19.00	20.25	6

== Ice hockey ==
South Korea qualified a team of thirteen ice hockey players for the women's 3-on-3 tournament and a team of eighteen ice hockey players for the men's tournament.

Summary

Key:

- OT – Overtime
- GWS – Game winning shots

Team	Event	Group stage								Semifinal	Final	
Team	Event	Opponent Score	Opponent Score	Opponent Score	Opponent Score	Opponent Score	Opponent Score	Opponent Score	Rank	Opponent Score	Opponent Score	Rank
South Korea women	Women's 3-on-3 tournament	China; L 3–6	Australia; W 12–2	Mexico; W 7–0	Turkey; W 1–4	Italy; W 6–5 GWS	Hungary; L 0–16	Netherlands; W 16–0	3	China; W 6–4	Hungary; L 2–10	2nd place, silver medalist(s)
South Korea men	Men's tournament	Canada; L 0–8	Finland; L 1–3	—N/a					3	Did not advance		

=== Women's 3-on-3 tournament ===
Roster

Kim Doyun served as head coach.

- Ahn Sewon
- Chang Seoyoon
- Choi Seoyoon
- Han Chaeyeon
- Han Yejin – A
- Han Yuan – A
- Hong Chaewon
- Jang Hyeonjeong
- Kim Jimin
- Na Seyoung
- Park Jeonghyun
- Park Juyeon – C
- Shim Seohee

Preliminary round

Pos	Team	Pld	W	OTW	OTL	L	GF	GA	GD	Pts	Qualification
1	Hungary	7	7	0	0	0	130	5	+125	21	Semifinals
2	China	7	6	0	0	1	70	25	+45	18	Semifinals
3	South Korea (H)	7	4	1	0	2	48	30	+18	14	Semifinals
4	Italy	7	4	0	1	2	67	31	+36	13	Semifinals
5	Turkey	7	3	0	0	4	36	41	−5	9	
6	Australia	7	2	0	0	5	23	75	−52	6	
7	Mexico	7	1	0	0	6	18	71	−53	3	
8	Netherlands	7	0	0	0	7	5	119	−114	0	

Source: IOC
(H) Host

20 January 2024; 16:00	South Korea	3–6 (1–3, 0–3, 2–0)	China	Gangneung Hockey Centre

Game reference
Referees: (Finland) Ilona Silander (Malaysia) Mei Wah Wan

21 January 2024; 13:30	Australia	2–12 (0–3, 0–5, 2–4)	South Korea	Gangneung Hockey Centre

Game reference
Referees: (Mexico) María Chávez (Ukraine) Anhelina Maifeld

21 January 2024; 20:30	South Korea	7–0 (3–0, 0–0, 4–0)	Mexico	Gangneung Hockey Centre

Game reference
Referees: (Ukraine) Anhelina Maifeld (Finland) Ilona Silander

22 January 2024; 12:00	Turkey	1–4 (0–3, 1–0, 0–1)	South Korea	Gangneung Hockey Centre

Game reference
Referees: (Mexico) María Chávez (Malaysia) Wan Mei Wah

22 January 2024; 19:00	Italy	5–6 GWS (2–3, 2–0, 1–2) (SO: 0–1)	South Korea	Gangneung Hockey Centre

Game reference
Referees: (Canada) Beatrice Fortin (Finland) Ilona Silander

23 January 2024; 13:30	South Korea	0–16 (0–7, 0–5, 0–4)	Hungary	Gangneung Hockey Centre

Game reference
Referees: (Mexico) María Chávez (Malaysia) Wan Mei Wah

23 January 2024; 20:30	South Korea	16–0 (4–0, 5–0, 7–0)	Netherlands	Gangneung Hockey Centre

Game reference
Referees: (Canada) Beatrice Fortin (Finland) Ilona Silander

Semifinal

24 January 2024; 13:30	China	4–6 (3–3, 0–2, 1–1)	South Korea	Gangneung Hockey Centre

Game reference
Referees: (Mexico) María Chávez (Malaysia) Wan Mei Wah

Final

25 January 2024; 14:00	Hungary	10–2 (2–0, 5–1, 3–1)	South Korea	Gangneung Hockey Centre

Game reference
Referees: (Canada) Beatrice Fortin (Ukraine) Anhelina Maifeld

=== Men's tournament ===
Roster

South Korea	Goaltenders: Song Geun-woo, Lee Dong-geun, Lim Jae-hun; Defensemen: Kim San, Ahn Geon-u, Park Moo-jin, Lee Young-min, Lee Jee-ahn, Lee Hyeong-jin; Forwards: Gong Si-wan, Ryu Hang-yul, Yeo Jun-soo, Lee Seung-jae, Kwak Kyeong-min, Kwak Woo-jin, Min Dong-wook, Cho Seung-hyun, Han Sang-yoon

Preliminary round

Pos	Team	Pld	W	SOW	SOL	L	GF	GA	GD	Pts	Qualification
1	Canada	2	2	0	0	0	12	1	+11	6	Semifinals
2	Finland	2	1	0	0	1	4	5	−1	3	Semifinals
3	South Korea (H)	2	0	0	0	2	1	11	−10	0	

Source: Gangwon 2024
(H) Host

27 January 2024; 20:00	South Korea	0–8 (0–3, 0–2, 0–3)	Canada	Gangneung Hockey Centre; Attendance: 3,877

Game reference

Lim Jae-hun
Goalies
Carter Esler
Colin Ellsworth
Referees:
(Norway) Oskar Øvstedal
(Netherlands) Adler Steenstra
Linesmen:
(Uzbekistan) David Prokofyev
(Sweden) Niclas Westman

0–1	01:38 – Preston (M. Ruck, Lin) (PP)
0–2	03:03 – L. Ruck (Preston) (PP)
0–3	11:32 – L. Ruck (M. Ruck, Verhoeff)
0–4	15:09 – Di Iorio
0–5	21:34 – L. Ruck (M. Ruck) (SH)
0–6	35:32 – Lawrence (O'Donnell)
0–7	38:25 – O'Donnell (Di Iorio) (SH)
0–8	44:52 – Valentini

6 min
Penalties
3 min
6
Shots
53

28 January 2024; 20:00	Finland	3–1 (1–1, 2–0, 0–0)	South Korea	Gangneung Hockey Centre; Attendance: 3,713

Game reference

William Gammals
Goalies
Lim Jae-hun
Referees:
(Denmark) Rasmus Ankersen
(United Kingdom) Joseph Sewell
Linesmen:
(Czech Republic) David Thuma
(Sweden) Niclas Westman

	0–1	01:01 – Gong (Lee S.)
Arkko (Alalauri, Kähkönen) – 11:05	1–1
Myllyniemi – 24:31	2–1
Torkki (Järvenpää, Kähkönen) – 28:53	3–1

1.5 min
Penalties
1.5 min
46
Shots
8

== Luge ==
Men

Athlete	Event	Run 1		Run 2		Total	
Athlete	Event	Time	Rank	Time	Rank	Time	Rank
Kim Bo-keun	Singles	47.572	11	47.474	13	1:35.046	11
Kim Ha-yoon; Bae Jae-seong	Doubles	48.898	7	49.813	9	1:38.711	8

Women

Athlete	Event	Run 1		Run 2		Total	
Athlete	Event	Time	Rank	Time	Rank	Time	Rank
Kim So-yoon	Singles	49.103	12	48.899	9	1:38.002	9
Park Ji-ye	Singles	49.194	13	49.176	11	1:38.370	12

Mixed team relay

Athlete	Event	Women's singles		Men's singles		Doubles		Total	
Athlete	Event	Time	Rank	Time	Rank	Time	Rank	Time	Rank
Kim So-yoon; Kim Bo-keun; Kim Ha-yoon; Bae Jae-seong	Team relay	49.943	6	50.643	3	52.324	6	2:32.910	4

== Short track speed skating ==
Men

Athlete	Event	Heats		Quarterfinal		Semifinal		Final	
Athlete	Event	Time	Rank	Time	Rank	Time	Rank	Time	Rank
Joo Jae-hee	500 m	42.499	2 Q	1:02.227	5	Did not advance			
Joo Jae-hee	1000 m	1:36.033	1 Q	1:29.839	1 Q	1:25.579	1 QA	2:31.327	4
Joo Jae-hee	1500 m	—N/a		2:16.239	1 Q	2:32.616	1 QA	2:21.906	1st place, gold medalist(s)
Kim You-sung	500 m	42.685	1 Q	42.035	4	Did not advance			
Kim You-sung	1000 m	1:32.293	1 Q	1:27.506	1 Q	1:26.488	4 QB	1:29.930	7
Kim You-sung	1500 m	—N/a		2:29.908	1 Q	2:21.960	1 QA	2:22.148	3rd place, bronze medalist(s)

Women

Athlete	Event	Heats		Quarterfinal		Semifinal		Final	
Athlete	Event	Time	Rank	Time	Rank	Time	Rank	Time	Rank
Chung Jae-hee	500 m	44.739	1 Q	44.327	1 Q	44.637	2 QA	45.018	3rd place, bronze medalist(s)
Chung Jae-hee	1000 m	1:37.899	1 Q	1:32.608	1 Q	1:49.337	4 QB	1:32.447	7
Chung Jae-hee	1500 m	—N/a		2:22.608	1 Q	2:26.762	1 QA	2:54.809	7
Kang Min-ji	500 m	44.514	1 Q	44.760	1 Q	44.328	2 QA	44.484	2nd place, silver medalist(s)
Kang Min-ji	1000 m	1:37.969	1 Q	1:32.476	1 Q	2:13.974	5 QB	1:32.012	6
Kang Min-ji	1500 m	—N/a		2:40.028	1 Q	2:27.378	4 QB	2:42.962	8

Mixed

Athlete	Event	Semifinal		Final	
Athlete	Event	Time	Rank	Time	Rank
Chung Jae-hee; Joo Jae-hee; Kang Min-ji; Kim You-sung	Mixed relay	3:14.302	4 QB	2:45.830	5

== Skeleton ==
Athlete	Event	Run 1		Run 2		Total	
Athlete	Event	Time	Rank	Time	Rank	Time	Rank
Shin Yeon-su	Men's	52.85	2	53.20	4	1:46.05	3rd place, bronze medalist(s)
Chung Ye-eun	Women's	55.61	7	55.29	6	1:50.90	7
Kim Ye-rim	Women's	56.00	11	56.05	10	1:52.05	11

== Ski jumping ==
South Korea qualified two male ski jumpers.

Individual

Athlete	Event	First round			Final			Total	
Athlete	Event	Distance	Points	Rank	Distance	Points	Rank	Points	Rank
Jang Sun-woong	Men's normal hill	84.5	67.7	24	85.0	70.5	23	138.2	23
Yang Seung-chan	Men's normal hill	87.5	73.9	22	87.0	70.7	21	144.6	21

== Snowboarding ==
Snowboard cross
Individual

Athlete	Event	Group stage		Semifinal	Final
Athlete	Event	Points	Rank	Position	Position
Joo Yi-tak	Men's snowboard cross	8	14	Did not advance	
Kim Ye-bin	Men's snowboard cross	10	12	Did not advance	
Hwang Se-lim	Women's snowboard cross	4	11	Did not advance	

Mixed

Athlete	Event	Pre-heats	Quarterfinal	Semifinal	Final
Athlete	Event	Position	Position	Position	Position
Kim Ye-bin; Hwang Se-lim	Team snowboard cross	DNF	Did not advance		

Halfpipe, Slopestyle & Big Air

Athlete	Event	Qualification				Final				
Athlete	Event	Run 1	Run 2	Best	Rank	Run 1	Run 2	Run 3	Best	Rank
Lee Chae-un	Men's big air	DNS								
Lee Chae-un	Men's halfpipe	86.00	89.50	89.50	1 Q	87.25	88.50	42.00	88.50	1st place, gold medalist(s)
Lee Chae-un	Men's slopestyle	58.50	29.25	58.50	7 Q	91.50	37.50	96.00	96.00	1st place, gold medalist(s)
Lee Dong-heon	Men's slopestyle	15.25	9.50	15.25	23	Did not advance				
Lee Ji-o	Men's halfpipe	72.00	73.00	73.00	6 Q	72.50	48.00	79.50	79.50	5
Choi Seo-woo	Women's big air	41.50	49.25	49.25	15	Did not advance				
Choi Seo-woo	Women's halfpipe	48.75	14.75	48.75	10 Q	40.75	37.50	16.00	40.75	10
Choi Seo-woo	Women's slopestyle	2.00	29.75	29.75	15	Did not advance				
Heo Young-hyun	Women's halfpipe	33.00	30.75	33.00	15	Did not advance				
Yu Seung-eun	Women's slopestyle	DNS								

== Speed skating ==
Men

Athlete	Event	Time	Rank
Heo Se-ok	500 m	37.507	8
Heo Se-ok	1500 m	1:55.78	10
Shin Seo-nung	500 m	37.13	3rd place, bronze medalist(s)
Shin Seo-nung	1500 m	1:58.52	16

Women

Athlete	Event	Time	Rank
Jung Hui-dan	500 m	39.64	2nd place, silver medalist(s)
Jung Hui-dan	1500 m	2:10.60	13
Lim Lee-won	500 m	41.03	8
Lim Lee-won	1500 m	2:06.28	6

Mass Start

Athlete	Event	Semifinal			Final		
Athlete	Event	Points	Time	Rank	Points	Time	Rank
Heo Se-ok	Men's mass start	30	6:19.01	1 Q	1	5:31.29	7
Shin Seo-nung	Men's mass start	2	5:32.06	7 Q	0	5:32.25	15
Jung Hui-dan	Women's mass start	1	5:59.24	10	Did not advance		
Lim Lee-won	Women's mass start	0	7:13.01	16	Did not advance		

Mixed relay

Athlete	Event	Semifinal		Final	
Athlete	Event	Time	Rank	Time	Rank
Lim Lee-won; Heo Se-ok	Mixed relay	3:07.84	2 Q	3:11.78	2nd place, silver medalist(s)

== See also ==
- South Korea at the 2024 Summer Olympics
