= Ice hockey at the 2024 Winter Youth Olympics – Women's 3x3 tournament =

2024 Winter Youth Olympics women's 3-on-3 ice hockey tournament
Tournament details
- Host country: South Korea
- Venue: 1 (in 1 host city)
- Dates: 20–25 January
- Teams: 8

Final positions
- Champions: Hungary (1st title)
- Runners-up: South Korea
- Third place: China
- Fourth place: Italy

Tournament statistics
- Games played: 32
- Goals scored: 452 (14.13 per game)

The women's 3-on-3 ice hockey tournament was one of four under-16 ice hockey events contested as part of the 2024 Winter Youth Olympics in Gangneung, South Korea. The tournament was held from 20 to 25 January at the Gangneung Hockey Centre.

Australia, China, Hungary, Italy, South Korea, Mexico, the Netherlands, and Turkey (as Türkiye) were each represented by a team of thirteen players born in 2008 or 2009.

== Officials ==
Five on-ice officials were selected for the tournament.

- (Mexico) María Chávez
- (Canada) Beatrice Fortin
- (Ukraine) Anhelina Maifeld
- (Finland) Ilona Silander
- (Malaysia) Mei Wah Wan

International Ice Hockey Federation representative Zsuzsanna Kolbenheyer of Hungary was the tournament chairperson. Finnish ice hockey player and two-time Olympic bronze medalist Emma Terho, Chair of the IOC Athletes' Commission, presented medals at the victory ceremony.

== Teams ==
No	Pos	Australia	China	Hungary	Italy
2	P	Sophie Reader	Li Jin	Lorina Haraszt	Sofia Moser
3	P	Elin Schmitz	Tian Xueying	Bonita Szabó	Maddalena Bedont – C
4	P	Gwen Ellis	Kou Chenfei – A	Dóra Bereczki	Aurora de Fanti
5	P	Annika Schmitz – A	Zhang Anna – C	Bíborka Simon	Emily Innocenti
6	P	Johanna Meissner	Li Yifei – A	Lili Hajdu	Giorgia Todesco – A
7	P	Jasmin Mayor	Li Xin	Luca Faragó	Arianna Novati
8	P	Poppy Noone	Xin Yufei	Boróka Bátyi	Eleonora Pisetta
9	P	Georgia Watts – A	Wang Jinghan	Krisztina Weiler – C	Carlotta Mellarè
10	P	Hannah Cryan	Zhao Guiyun	Réka Hiezl – A	Aurora Varesco
11	P	Grace Kalambokas	Wang Bing	Petra Polónyi – A	Nicole Varesco
12	P	Tara Baker – C	Mi Lan	Lara Sághy	Olivia de Bortoli – A
30	GK	Olivia Gargano	Ju Sihan	Csenge Csordás	Caterina Bolech
31	GK	Katie Meyer	Zhang Jing	Zoé Takács	Lucrezia La Sala
Head coach		Remi Harvey	Myles Fitzgerald	Delaney Collins	Luca Giacomuzzi
No	Pos	South Korea	Mexico	Netherlands	Turkey
2	P	Na Seyoung	Natalia Molinar	Eva Bout	Dolunay Beren Erbakan
3	P	Park Juyeon – C	Camila de la Fuente	Janne Breek	Tan Nisan Göksal – C
4	P	Chang Seoyoon	Ariadna Lorenzana – A	Daylin den Hartog	Melisa Çağdaş
5	P	Kim Jimin	Rebeca Andrade	Ruth Eldering	Fatma Bengisu Açarı
6	P	Choi Seoyoon	Yaretzi García	Noa Frank	Ece Eraşcı
7	P	Han Yejin – A	Sofía Labastida – A	Lara Kluijtmans – A	Sidre Deniz Hacıosmanoğlu
8	P	Han Yuan – A	Tululy Hernández	Livvy Lammers	Ekin Daş
9	P	Han Chaeyeon	Ana Sofía Soto Borja – C	Vera Luitwieler	Eda Seçen
10	P	Hang Hyeonjeong	Diana Pérez	Evy Stoltenborg	Melis Arslan
11	P	Hong Chaewon	Constanza del Río	Beer van Oosterhout – C	Eylül Daş – A
12	P	Shim Seohee	Natalia Salinas	Harper Winkler	Azra Nur Şenyuva – A
30	GK	Park Jeonghyun	Sofía Hernández	Isabel Treffers	Beray Derin Okut
31	GK	Ahn Sewon	Jade Garduño	Felien van der Sluis	Azra Betül Kılaç
Head coach(es)		Kim Doyun	Bertha González Maza, Mónica Rentería Peñafort	Jennifer Wakefield	Ashley Salerno

== Preliminary round ==
The preliminary round was played as a single round-robin, with each team playing seven matches. Teams were ranked on a point system: three points for a win in regulation time, two points for a win in overtime, and one point for a loss in overtime. The four teams with the highest point totals at the conclusion of the preliminary round qualified for the semifinals.

=== Standings ===
Pos	Team	Pld	W	OTW	OTL	L	GF	GA	GD	Pts	Qualification
1	Hungary	7	7	0	0	0	130	5	+125	21	Semifinals
2	China	7	6	0	0	1	70	25	+45	18	Semifinals
3	South Korea (H)	7	4	1	0	2	48	30	+18	14	Semifinals
4	Italy	7	4	0	1	2	67	31	+36	13	Semifinals
5	Turkey	7	3	0	0	4	36	41	−5	9	
6	Australia	7	2	0	0	5	23	75	−52	6	
7	Mexico	7	1	0	0	6	18	71	−53	3	
8	Netherlands	7	0	0	0	7	5	119	−114	0	

Source: IOC
(H) Host

=== Results ===
All times are local, Korean Standard Time (UTC+9)

20 January 2024; 16:00	Netherlands	1–6 (1–0, 0–4, 0–2)	Australia	Gangneung Hockey Centre

Game reference
Referees: (Canada) Beatrice Fortin (Ukraine) Anhelina Maifeld

20 January 2024; 16:00	South Korea	3–6 (1–3, 0–3, 2–0)	China	Gangneung Hockey Centre

Game reference
Referees: (Finland) Ilona Silander (Malaysia) Mei Wah Wan

20 January 2024; 17:30	Italy	5–3 (1–1, 3–1, 1–1)	Turkey	Gangneung Hockey Centre

Game reference
Referees: (Mexico) María Chávez (Ukraine) Anhelina Maifeld

20 January 2024; 17:30	Mexico	0–17 (0–5, 0–3, 0–9)	Hungary	Gangneung Hockey Centre

Game reference
Referees: (Finland) Ilona Silander (Malaysia) Mei Wah Wan

21 January 2024; 12:00	Netherlands	2–9 (2–2, 0–4, 0–3)	Mexico	Gangneung Hockey Centre

Game reference
Referees: (Mexico) María Chávez (Canada) Beatrice Fortin

21 January 2024; 12:00	China	4–3 (3–1, 1–2, 0–0)	Italy	Gangneung Hockey Centre

Game reference
Referees: (Ukraine) Anhelina Maifeld (Finland) Ilona Silander

21 January 2024; 13:30	Australia	2–12 (0–3, 0–5, 2–4)	South Korea	Gangneung Hockey Centre

Game reference
Referees: (Mexico) María Chávez (Ukraine) Anhelina Maifeld

21 January 2024; 13:30	Hungary	18–0 (6–0, 3–0, 9–0)	Turkey	Gangneung Hockey Centre

Game reference
Referees: (Canada) Beatrice Fortin (Malaysia) Mei Wah Wan

21 January 2024; 19:00	Hungary	13–3 (3–0, 3–2, 7–1)	China	Gangneung Hockey Centre

Game reference

Referees:
(Mexico) María Chávez
(Canada) Beatrice Fortin

PP	1–0
PP	2–0
EQ	3–0
EQ	4–0
EQ	5–0
	5–1	SH
EQ	6–1
	6–2	EQ
EQ	7–2
PP	8–2
PP	9–2
PP	10–2
PP	11–2
EQ	12–2
EQ	13–2
	13–3	PP

21 January 2024; 19:00	Netherlands	2–11 (1–2, 0–7, 1–2)	Turkey	Gangneung Hockey Centre

Game reference
Referees: (Finland) Ilona Silander (Malaysia) Mei Wah Wan

21 January 2024; 20:30	Italy	15–4 (5–1, 9–2, 1–1)	Australia	Gangneung Hockey Centre

Game reference
Referees: (Canada) Beatrice Fortin (Malaysia) Mei Wah Wan

21 January 2024; 20:30	South Korea	7–0 (3–0, 0–0, 4–0)	Mexico	Gangneung Hockey Centre

Game reference
Referees: (Ukraine) Anhelina Maifeld (Finland) Ilona Silander

22 January 2024; 12:00	Turkey	1–4 (0–3, 1–0, 0–1)	South Korea	Gangneung Hockey Centre

Game reference
Referees: (Mexico) María Chávez (Malaysia) Wan Mei Wah

22 January 2024; 12:00	Australia	1–22 (0–5, 0–8, 1–9)	Hungary	Gangneung Hockey Centre

Game reference
Referees: (Canada) Beatrice Fortin (Finland) Ilona Silander

22 January 2024; 13:30	China	17–0 (5–0, 6–0, 6–0)	Netherlands	Gangneung Hockey Centre

Game reference
Referees: (Ukraine) Anhelika Maifeld (Malaysia) Wan Mei Wah

22 January 2024; 13:30	Italy	11–3 (3–1, 5–1, 3–1)	Mexico	Gangneung Hockey Centre

Game reference
Referees: (Mexico) María Chávez (Finland) Ilona Silander

22 January 2024; 19:00	Italy	5–6 GWS (2–3, 2–0, 1–2) (SO: 0–1)	South Korea	Gangneung Hockey Centre

Game reference
Referees: (Canada) Beatrice Fortin (Finland) Ilona Silander

22 January 2024; 19:00	Mexico	4–5 (0–1, 2–1, 2–3)	Australia	Gangneung Hockey Centre

Game reference
Referees: (Mexico) María Chávez (Ukraine) Anhelina Maifeld

22 January 2024; 20:30	China	9–2 (4–1, 4–0, 1–1)	Turkey	Gangneung Hockey Centre

Game reference
Referees: (Mexico) María Chávez (Canada) Beatrice Fortin

22 January 2024; 20:30	Hungary	33–0 (10–0, 14–0, 9–0)	Netherlands	Gangneung Hockey Centre

Game reference
Referees: (Canada) Domenica Maurer (Malaysia) Wan Mei Wah

23 January 2024; 12:00	Netherlands	0–27 (0–5, 0–12, 0–10)	Italy	Gangneung Hockey Centre

Game reference
Referees: (Mexico) María Chávez (Finland) Ilona Silander

23 January 2024; 12:00	Mexico	1–20 (0–6, 1–6, 0–8)	China	Gangneung Hockey Centre

Game reference
Referees: (Ukraine) Anhelina Maifeld (Malaysia) Wan Mei Wah

23 January 2024; 13:30	Turkey	10–2 (3–1, 2–1, 5–0)	Australia	Gangneung Hockey Centre

Game reference
Referees: (Canada) Beatrice Fortin (Ukraine) Anhelina Maifeld

23 January 2024; 13:30	South Korea	0–16 (0–7, 0–5, 0–4)	Hungary	Gangneung Hockey Centre

Game reference
Referees: (Mexico) María Chávez (Malaysia) Wan Mei Wah

23 January 2024; 19:00	Hungary	11–1 (2–0, 4–1, 5–0)	Italy	Gangneung Hockey Centre

Game reference
Referees: (Canada) Beatrice Fortin (Malaysia) Wan Mei Wah

23 January 2024; 19:00	Turkey	9–1 (3–0, 5–0, 1–1)	Mexico	Gangneung Hockey Centre

Game reference
Referees: (Ukraine) Anhelina Maifeld (Finland) Ilona Silander

23 January 2024; 20:30	Australia	3–11 (1–4, 1–5, 1–2)	China	Gangneung Hockey Centre

Game reference
Referees: (Mexico) María Chávez (Ukraine) Anhelina Maifeld

23 January 2024; 20:30	South Korea	16–0 (4–0, 5–0, 7–0)	Netherlands	Gangneung Hockey Centre

Game reference
Referees: (Canada) Beatrice Fortin (Finland) Ilona Silander

== Playoff round ==
Semifinals
24 January
Hungary	14
Italy	4
24 January
China	4
South Korea	6

Final
25 January
Hungary	10
South Korea	2
Third place
25 January
China	8
Italy	7

=== Semifinals ===
24 January 2024; 12:00	Hungary	14–4 (6–0, 5–2, 3–2)	Italy	Gangneung Hockey Centre

Game reference
Referees: (Canada) Beatrice Fortin (Finland) Ilona Silander

24 January 2024; 13:30	China	4–6 (3–3, 0–2, 1–1)	South Korea	Gangneung Hockey Centre

Game reference
Referees: (Mexico) María Chávez (Malaysia) Wan Mei Wah

=== Bronze medal game ===
25 January 2024; 12:00	China	8–7 (3–2, 2–4, 3–1)	Italy	Gangneung Hockey Centre

Game reference
Referees: (Mexico) María Chávez (Malaysia) Wan Mei Wah

=== Gold medal game ===
25 January 2024; 14:00	Hungary	10–2 (2–0, 5–1, 3–1)	South Korea	Gangneung Hockey Centre

Game reference
Referees: (Canada) Beatrice Fortin (Ukraine) Anhelina Maifeld

== Final standings ==
Pos	Team	Pld	W	OTW	OTL	L	GF	GA	GD	Pts	Final result
1	Hungary	9	9	0	0	0	154	11	+143	27	Gold medal
2	South Korea (H)	9	5	1	0	3	56	44	+12	17	Silver medal
3	China	9	7	0	0	2	82	38	+44	21	Bronze medal
4	Italy	9	4	0	1	4	78	53	+25	13	Fourth place
5	Turkey	7	3	0	0	4	36	41	−5	9	
6	Australia	7	2	0	0	5	23	75	−52	6	
7	Mexico	7	1	0	0	6	18	71	−53	3	
8	Netherlands	7	0	0	0	7	5	119	−114	0	

Source: IOC
(H) Host
