= Italy at the 2024 Winter Youth Olympics =

- Flag of Italy
- IOC code: ITA
- NOC: Italian Olympic Committee

in Gangwon, South Korea 19 January 2024 – 1 February 2024
- Competitors: 74 in 13 sports
- Flag bearer (opening): Flora Tabanelli
- Flag bearer (closing): TBD
- Medals Ranked 1st: Gold 11 Silver 3 Bronze 4 Total 18

Winter Youth Olympics appearances
- 2012; 2016; 2020; 2024

Italy is scheduled to compete at the 2024 Winter Youth Olympics in Gangwon, South Korea, from 19 January to 1 February 2024. This will be Italy's fourth appearance at the Winter Youth Olympic Games, having competed at every Games since the inaugural edition in 2012.

Freestyle skier Flora Tabanelli was the country's flagbearer during the opening ceremony.

== Competitors ==
The following is the list of number of competitors (per gender) participating at the games per sport/discipline.

Sport	Men	Women	Total
Alpine skiing	3	3	6
Biathlon	4	4	8
Cross-country skiing	3	3	6
Curling	3	3	6
Figure skating	2	1	3
Freestyle skiing	2	3	5
Ice hockey	0	13	13
Luge	3	2	5
Nordic combined	2	2	4
Short track speed skating	2	2	4
Ski jumping	2	2	4
Snowboard	4	2	6
Speed skating	2	2	4
Total	32	42	74

== Medalists ==
Medal	Name	Sport	Event	Date
Gold	Camilla Vanni	Alpine skiing	Women's super-G	21 January
Gold	Philipp Brunner; Manuel Weissensteiner	Luge	Men's doubles	20 January
Gold	Katharina Sofie Kofler; Alexandra Oberstolz	Luge	Women's doubles	21 January
Gold	Leon Haselrieder	Luge	Men's singles	21 January
Gold	Philipp Brunner; Leon Haselrieder; Alexandra Oberstolz; Manuel Weissensteiner	Luge	Team relay	23 January
Gold	Giorgia Collomb	Alpine skiing	Women's giant slalom	23 January
Gold	Carlotta Gautero	Biathlon	Women's sprint	23 January
Gold	Nayeli Mariotti Cavagnet; Carlotta Gautero; Hannes Bacher; Michel Deval	Biathlon	Mixed relay	24 January
Gold	Flora Tabanelli	Freestyle skiing	Women's slopestyle	24 January
Gold	Flora Tabanelli	Freestyle skiing	Women's big air	28 January
Gold	Federico Pozzi	Cross-country skiing	Men's sprint	29 January
Silver	Alexandra Oberstolz	Luge	Women's singles	20 January
Silver	Giorgia Collomb	Alpine skiing	Women's combined	22 January
Silver	Manuel Senoner	Nordic combined	Men's individual normal hill/6 km	29 January
Bronze	Nayeli Mariotti Cavagnet	Biathlon	Women's individual	20 January
Bronze	Philipp Brunner	Luge	Men's singles	21 January
Bronze	Giorgia Collomb	Alpine skiing	Women's slalom	25 January
Bronze	Bryan Venturini; Giada Delugan; Anna Senoner; Manuel Senoner	Nordic combined	Mixed team normal hill/4 × 3.3 km	31 January

== Alpine skiing ==
Italy qualified six alpine skiers (three per gender).

Men

Athlete	Event	Run 1		Run 2		Total	
Athlete	Event	Time	Rank	Time	Rank	Time	Rank
Jonas Feichter	Super-G	—N/a				55.21	12
Jonas Feichter	Giant slalom	49.95	9	46.16	6	1:36.11	5
Jonas Feichter	Slalom	47.20	5	Did not finish			
Jonas Feichter	Combined	55.24	10	Did not finish			
Pietro Scesa	Super-G|	—N/a				56.09	24
Pietro Scesa	Giant slalom	Did not finish					
Pietro Scesa	Slalom	48.26	11	53.02	10	1:41.28	8
Pietro Scesa	Combined	56.72	31	Did not finish			
Edoardo Simonelli	Super-G	—N/a				55.57	18
Edoardo Simonelli	Giant slalom	49.93	8	Did not finish			
Edoardo Simonelli	Slalom	48.33	14	52.56	6	1:40.90	7
Edoardo Simonelli	Combined	55.85	18	56.26	16	1:52.11	17

Women

Athlete	Event	Run 1		Run 2		Total	
Athlete	Event	Time	Rank	Time	Rank	Time	Rank
Giorgia Collomb	Super-G	—N/a				54.22	6
Giorgia Collomb	Giant slalom	48.42	1	52.68	2	1:41.10	1st place, gold medalist(s)
Giorgia Collomb	Slalom	49.89	3	48.57	4	1:38.46	3rd place, bronze medalist(s)
Giorgia Collomb	Combined	57.51	13	50.85	1	1:48.36	2nd place, silver medalist(s)
Rita Granruaz	Super-G	—N/a				Did not finish	
Rita Granruaz	Giant slalom	49.05	5	53.58	8	1:42.63	6
Rita Granruaz	Slalom	52.17	17	49.34	13	1:41.51	13
Rita Granruaz	Combined	Did not finish					
Camilla Vanni	Super-G	—N/a				53.54	1st place, gold medalist(s)
Camilla Vanni	Giant slalom	48:88	3	Did not finish			
Camilla Vanni	Slalom	52.20	18	Did not finish			
Camilla Vanni	Combined	56.61	5	53.46	16	1:50.07	8

Mixed

Athlete	Event	Round of 16	Quarterfinals	Semifinals	Final / BM	
Athlete	Event	Opponent Result	Opponent Result	Opponent Result	Opponent Result	Rank
Camilla Vanni; Pietro Scesa	Parallel mixed team	Argentina; W 3–1	United States; L 2–2*	Did not advance		

== Biathlon ==
Men

Athlete	Event	Time	Misses	Rank
Hannes Bacher	Sprint	23:00.8	6 (3+3)	14
Hannes Bacher	Individual	43:59.1	7 (2+3+1+1)	8
Manuel Contoz	Sprint	24:31.0	5 (3+2)	45
Manuel Contoz	Individual	46:25.5	6 (2+3+1+0)	26
Michel Deval	Sprint	22:12.9	0 (0+0)	6
Michel Deval	Individual	46:50.2	6 (1+3+1+1)	29
Antonio Pertile	Sprint	24:39.2	4 (3+1)	52
Antonio Pertile	Individual	50:48.1	8 (1+0+2+5)	65

Women

Athlete	Event	Time	Misses	Rank
Carlotta Gautero	Sprint	19:40.2	1 (1+0)	1st place, gold medalist(s)
Carlotta Gautero	Individual	39:11.8	4 (0+1+1+2)	8
Matilde Giordano	Sprint	21:48.8	5 (2+3)	15
Matilde Giordano	Individual	38:40.0	3 (2+0+1+0)	5
Eva Hutter	Sprint	22:41.7	4 (2+2)	32
Eva Hutter	Individual	44:34.3	7 (3+1+1+2)	52
Nayeli Mariotti Cavagnet	Sprint	21:16.3	4 (3+1)	9
Nayeli Mariotti Cavagnet	Individual	38:23.0	3 (0+1+1+1)	3rd place, bronze medalist(s)

Mixed

Athletes	Event	Time	Misses	Rank
Hannes Bacher; Nayeli Mariotti Cavagnet	Single mixed relay	45:46.4	3+14	5
Hannes Bacher; Michel Deval; Carlotta Gautero; Nayeli Mariotti Cavagnet	Mixed relay	1:15:12.4	3+11	1st place, gold medalist(s)

== Cross-country skiing ==
Italy qualified six cross-country skiers (three per gender).

Men

Athlete	Event	Qualification		Quarterfinal		Semifinal		Final	
Athlete	Event	Time	Rank	Time	Rank	Time	Rank	Time	Rank
Niccolo Bianchi	7.5 km classical	—N/a						20:48.9	19
Niccolo Bianchi	Sprint freestyle	3:09.66	19 Q	3:05.95	4	Did not advance			
Marco Pinzani	7.5 km classical	—N/a						20:22.4	9
Marco Pinzani	Sprint freestyle	3:08.93	15 Q	3:10.67	2 Q	3:10.15	5	Did not advance	
Federico Pozzi	7.5 km classical	—N/a						20:23.0	10
Federico Pozzi	Sprint freestyle	3:04.43	2 Q	3:04.48	2 Q	3:09.64	2 Q	3:16.27	1st place, gold medalist(s)

Women

Athlete	Event	Qualification		Quarterfinal		Semifinal		Final	
Athlete	Event	Time	Rank	Time	Rank	Time	Rank	Time	Rank
Vanessa Cagnati	7.5 km classical	—N/a						23:26.5	18
Vanessa Cagnati	Sprint freestyle	3:48.51	29 Q	3:38.74	5	Did not advance			
Stella Giacomelli	7.5 km classical	—N/a						24:41.1	31
Stella Giacomelli	Sprint freestyle	3:54.33	39	Did not advance					
Marie Schwitzer	7.5 km classical	—N/a						22:45.3	7
Marie Schwitzer	Sprint freestyle	3:40.94	19 Q	3:37.59	3 LL	3:43.93	5	Did not advance	

Mixed

Athlete	Event	Time	Rank
Marie Schwitzer; Marco Pinzani; Vanessa Cagnati; Federico Pozzi	Mixed relay	54:29.4	7

== Curling ==
Italy qualified a mixed team and mixed doubles pair for a total of six athletes.

Summary

Team	Event	Group Stage								Quarterfinal	Semifinal	Final / BM	
Team	Event	Opposition Score	Opposition Score	Opposition Score	Opposition Score	Opposition Score	Opposition Score	Opposition Score	Rank	Opposition Score	Opposition Score	Opposition Score	Rank
Andrea Gilli; Giorgia Maurino; Alberto Cavallero; Rebecca Mariani	Mixed team	Canada; W 8–3	South Korea; W 6–5	Germany; W 7–5	Denmark; L 3–7	Great Britain; L 5–7	Brazil; W 10–3	Switzerland; L 7–8	4	Did not advance			7
Vittoria Maioni; Elia Nichelatti	Mixed doubles	Switzerland; L 2–7	Denmark; L 3–13	Austria; L 5–6	Germany; L 2–8	Kazakhstan; L 2–10	—N/a		6	Did not advance			21

=== Mixed team ===
Group B	Skip	W	L	W–L	PF	PA	EW	EL	BE	SE	DSC
Great Britain	Logan Carson	6	1	–	44	30	26	21	4	7	51.75
Denmark	Jacob Schmidt	5	2	–	48	28	27	20	2	9	34.70
Switzerland	Nathan Dryburgh	4	3	2–0	52	35	25	23	5	7	39.96
Italy	Andrea Gilli	4	3	1–1	46	38	29	23	3	7	50.58
South Korea	Kim Dae-hyun	4	3	0–2	48	33	24	22	3	8	109.88
Canada	Nathan Gray	3	4	–	40	34	24	20	3	11	35.43
Brazil	Pedro Ribeiro	1	6	1–0	17	81	13	31	0	2	103.39
Germany	Lukas Jäger	1	6	0–1	30	46	19	27	2	5	68.51

Round robin

Draw 1

Saturday, January 20, 14:00

Sheet D	1	2	3	4	5	6	7	8	Final
Canada (Gray)	0	1	0	1	0	1	0	0	3
Italy (Gilli) 🔨	1	0	1	0	3	0	2	1	8

Draw 2

Sunday, January 21, 10:00

Sheet B	1	2	3	4	5	6	7	8	9	Final
South Korea (Kim)	0	1	0	0	3	0	1	0	0	5
Italy (Gilli) 🔨	1	0	0	2	0	1	0	1	1	6

Draw 3

Sunday, January 21, 18:00

Sheet A	1	2	3	4	5	6	7	8	Final
Germany (Jäger) 🔨	0	1	0	0	2	0	2	0	5
Italy (Gilli)	1	0	1	2	0	2	0	1	7

Draw 4

Monday, January 22, 14:00

Sheet C	1	2	3	4	5	6	7	8	Final
Italy (Gilli)	0	0	2	0	0	1	0	X	3
Denmark (Schmidt) 🔨	3	0	0	2	1	0	1	X	7

Draw 5

Tuesday, January 23, 10:00

Sheet A	1	2	3	4	5	6	7	8	Final
Italy (Gilli) 🔨	2	0	1	0	1	0	1	0	5
Great Britain (Carson)	0	2	0	2	0	2	0	1	7

Draw 6

Tuesday, January 23, 18:00

Sheet C	1	2	3	4	5	6	7	8	Final
Brazil (Ribeiro)	0	1	0	0	0	2	X	X	3
Italy (Gilli) 🔨	4	0	0	4	2	0	X	X	10

Draw 7

Wednesday, January 24, 13:00

Sheet D	1	2	3	4	5	6	7	8	9	Final
Italy (Gilli)	0	1	1	0	2	1	0	2	0	7
Switzerland (Dryburgh) 🔨	2	0	0	4	0	0	1	0	1	8

=== Mixed doubles ===
Group D	W	L	W–L	DSC
Denmark	4	1	1–1	30.64
Germany	4	1	1–1	31.04
Switzerland	4	1	1–1	79.90
Austria	2	3	–	40.68
Kazakhstan	1	4	–	44.33
Italy	0	5	–	107.78

Round robin

Draw 1

Friday, January 26, 18:00

Sheet C	1	2	3	4	5	6	7	8	Final
Italy (Maioni / Nichelatti) 🔨	0	1	0	0	1	0	0	X	2
Switzerland (Haehlen / Caccivio)	1	0	3	1	0	1	1	X	7

Draw 2

Saturday, January 27, 10:00

Sheet D	1	2	3	4	5	6	7	8	Final
Italy (Maioni / Nichelatti)	0	3	0	0	0	0	X	X	3
Denmark (Schmidt / Schmidt) 🔨	2	0	4	4	2	1	X	X	13

Draw 6

Sunday, January 28, 14:00

Sheet B	1	2	3	4	5	6	7	8	Final
Italy (Maioni / Nichelatti)	1	0	1	1	0	2	0	0	5
Austria (Müller / Heinisch) 🔨	0	2	0	0	2	0	1	1	6

Draw 8

Monday, January 29, 10:00

Sheet A	1	2	3	4	5	6	7	8	Final
Germany (Sutor / Angrick) 🔨	1	1	0	1	0	5	X	X	8
Italy (Maioni / Nichelatti)	0	0	1	0	1	0	X	X	2

Draw 13

Tuesday, January 30, 18:00

Sheet D	1	2	3	4	5	6	7	8	Final
Kazakhstan (Tastemir / Tastemir) 🔨	1	2	3	0	4	0	X	X	10
Italy (Maioni / Nichelatti)	0	0	0	1	0	1	X	X	2

== Figure skating ==
Athlete	Event	SP/SD		FS/FD		Total	
Athlete	Event	Points	Rank	Points	Rank	Points	Rank
Raffaele Francesco Zich	Men's singles	66.05	6	123.79	7	189.84	6
Zoe Bianchi; Pietro Rota	Ice dance	41.50	10	64.33	10	105.83	10

== Freestyle skiing ==
Dual moguls

Athlete	Event	Group Stage						Semifinals	Final / BM	
Athlete	Event	Opposition Result	Opposition Result	Opposition Result	Opposition Result	Points	Rank	Opposition Result	Opposition Result	Rank
Manuela Passaretta	Women's dual moguls	Li (CHN); L 2–3	Frenkel (THA); W 3–2	Taguchi (JPN); W 3–0	Moon (KOR); W 3–2	11	1 Q	Lemley (USA); L 10–25	McLarnon (USA); L 16–19	4

Ski cross
Individual

Athlete	Event	Group heats		Semifinal	Final
Athlete	Event	Points	Rank	Position	Position
Luis Lechner	Men's ski cross	15	5	Did not advance	
Francesco Saletti	Men's ski cross	11	10	Did not advance	
Desi Rizzoli	Women's ski cross	13	8	Did not advance	

Team

Athlete	Event	Pre-heats	Quarterfinal	Semifinal	Final
Athlete	Event	Position	Position	Position	Position
Luis Lechner; Desi Rizzoli	Team ski cross	3	Did not advance		

Halfpipe, Slopestyle & Big Air

Athlete	Event	Qualification				Final				
Athlete	Event	Run 1	Run 2	Best	Rank	Run 1	Run 2	Run 3	Best	Rank
Flora Tabanelli	Women's big air	89.50	7.50	89.50	1 Q	87.50	92.50	42.00	180.00	1st place, gold medalist(s)
Flora Tabanelli	Women's slopestyle	91.00	55.75	91.00	1 Q	25.00	74.75	90.50	90.50	1st place, gold medalist(s)

== Ice hockey ==
Italy qualified a team of thirteen ice hockey players for the women's 3-on-3 tournament.

Roster

Luca Giacomuzzi served as head coach.

- Maddalena Bedont – C
- Caterina Bolech
- Olivia de Bortoli – A
- Aurora de Fanti
- Emily Innocenti
- Lucrezia la Sala
- Carlotta Mellare
- Sofia Moser
- Arianna Novati
- Eleonora Pisetta
- Giorgia Todesco – A
- Aurora Varesco
- Nicole Varesco

=== Women's 3x3 tournament ===
Summary

Key:

- GWS – Game winning shots

Team	Event	Group stage								Semifinal	Final	
Team	Event	Opponent Score	Opponent Score	Opponent Score	Opponent Score	Opponent Score	Opponent Score	Opponent Score	Rank	Opponent Score	Opponent Score	Rank
Italy	Women's 3x3 tournament	Turkey; W 5–3	China; L 3–4	Australia; W 15–4	Mexico; W 11–3	South Korea; L 5–6 GWS	Netherlands; W 0–27	Hungary; L 1–11	4	Hungary; L 4–14	China; L 7–8	4

Preliminary round

Pos	Team	Pld	W	OTW	OTL	L	GF	GA	GD	Pts	Qualification
1	Hungary	7	7	0	0	0	130	5	+125	21	Semifinals
2	China	7	6	0	0	1	70	25	+45	18	Semifinals
3	South Korea (H)	7	4	1	0	2	48	30	+18	14	Semifinals
4	Italy	7	4	0	1	2	67	31	+36	13	Semifinals
5	Turkey	7	3	0	0	4	36	41	−5	9	
6	Australia	7	2	0	0	5	23	75	−52	6	
7	Mexico	7	1	0	0	6	18	71	−53	3	
8	Netherlands	7	0	0	0	7	5	119	−114	0	

Source: IOC
(H) Host

20 January 2024; 17:30	Italy	5–3 (1–1, 3–1, 1–1)	Turkey	Gangneung Hockey Centre

Game reference
Referees: (Mexico) María Chávez (Ukraine) Anhelina Maifeld

21 January 2024; 12:00	China	4–3 (3–1, 1–2, 0–0)	Italy	Gangneung Hockey Centre

Game reference
Referees: (Ukraine) Anhelina Maifeld (Finland) Ilona Silander

21 January 2024; 20:30	Italy	15–4 (5–1, 9–2, 1–1)	Australia	Gangneung Hockey Centre

Game reference
Referees: (Canada) Beatrice Fortin (Malaysia) Mei Wah Wan

22 January 2024; 13:30	Italy	11–3 (3–1, 5–1, 3–1)	Mexico	Gangneung Hockey Centre

Game reference
Referees: (Mexico) María Chávez (Finland) Ilona Silander

22 January 2024; 19:00	Italy	5–6 GWS (2–3, 2–0, 1–2) (SO: 0–1)	South Korea	Gangneung Hockey Centre

Game reference
Referees: (Canada) Beatrice Fortin (Finland) Ilona Silander

23 January 2024; 12:00	Netherlands	0–27 (0–5, 0–12, 0–10)	Italy	Gangneung Hockey Centre

Game reference
Referees: (Mexico) María Chávez (Finland) Ilona Silander

23 January 2024; 19:00	Hungary	11–1 (2–0, 4–1, 5–0)	Italy	Gangneung Hockey Centre

Game reference
Referees: (Canada) Beatrice Fortin (Malaysia) Wan Mei Wah

Semifinal

24 January 2024; 12:00	Hungary	14–4 (6–0, 5–2, 3–2)	Italy	Gangneung Hockey Centre

Game reference
Referees: (Canada) Beatrice Fortin (Finland) Ilona Silander

Bronze medal game

25 January 2024; 12:00	China	8–7 (3–2, 2–4, 3–1)	Italy	Gangneung Hockey Centre

Game reference
Referees: (Mexico) María Chávez (Malaysia) Wan Mei Wah

== Luge ==
Men

Athlete	Event	Run 1		Run 2		Total	
Athlete	Event	Time	Rank	Time	Rank	Time	Rank
Philipp Brunner	Singles	46.653	3	46.588	3	1:33.241	3rd place, bronze medalist(s)
Leon Haselrieder	Singles	46.294	2	46.062	1	1:32.356	1st place, gold medalist(s)
Philipp Brunner; Manuel Weißensteiner	Doubles	46.951	1	47.332	2	1:34.283	1st place, gold medalist(s)

Women

Athlete	Event	Run 1		Run 2		Total	
Athlete	Event	Time	Rank	Time	Rank	Time	Rank
Katharina Sofie Kofler	Singles	48.971	9	49.785	17	1:38.756	15
Alexandra Oberstolz	Singles	48:205	2	48.121	2	1:36.326	2nd place, silver medalist(s)
Katharina Sofie Kofler; Alexandra Oberstolz	Doubles	47.975	1	48.496	1	1:36.471	1st place, gold medalist(s)

Mixed team relay

Athletes	Event	Women's singles		Men's singles		Doubles		Total	
Athletes	Event	Time	Rank	Time	Rank	Time	Rank	Time	Rank
Philipp Brunner; Leon Haselrieder; Alexandra Oberstolz; Manuel Weißensteiner	Team relay	49.244	3	50.047	2	50.179	2	2:29.470	1st place, gold medalist(s)

== Nordic combined ==
Individual

Athlete	Event	Ski jumping				Cross-country	
Athlete	Event	Distance	Points	Rank	Deficit	Time	Rank
Manuel Senoner	Men's normal hill/6 km	105.5	132.2	4	+0:35	13:47.4	2nd place, silver medalist(s)
Bryan Venturini	Men's normal hill/6 km	94.5	107.4	15	+2:14	15:43.2	14
Giada Delugan	Women's normal hill/4 km	95.5	103.3	10	+2:00	12:16.6	6
Anna Senoner	Women's normal hill/4 km	94.5	107.0	7	+1:45	12:46.5	10

Team

Athlete	Event	Ski jumping			Cross-country	
Athlete	Event	Points	Rank	Deficit	Time	Rank
Giada Delugan; Bryan Venturini; Manuel Senoner; Anna Senoner	Mixed team	433.4	3	+0:15	34:32.4	3rd place, bronze medalist(s)

== Short track speed skating ==
Men

Athlete	Event	Heats		Quarterfinal		Semifinal		Final	
Athlete	Event	Time	Rank	Time	Rank	Time	Rank	Time	Rank
Aaron Pietrobono	500 m	42.629	3 q	42.667	4	Did not advance			
Aaron Pietrobono	1000 m	1:34.495	3	Did not advance					
Aaron Pietrobono	1500 m	—N/a		2:33.358	3 Q	2:36.894	6	Did not advance	
Daniele Zampedri	500 m	42.790	2 Q	42.350	2 Q	42.513	5 FB	41.831	6
Daniele Zampedri	1000 m	1:33.547	2 Q	1:27.753	4	Did not advance			
Daniele Zampedri	1500 m	—N/a		2:21.057	3 Q	2:24.305	5 FB	2:41.355	8

Women

Athlete	Event	Heats		Quarterfinal		Semifinal		Final	
Athlete	Event	Time	Rank	Time	Rank	Time	Rank	Time	Rank
Sara Martinelli	500 m	47.074	3	Did not advance					
Sara Martinelli	1000 m	1:38.426	3	Did not advance					
Sara Martinelli	1500 m	—N/a		2:27.789	4 q	2:34.007	7	Did not advance	
Sara Merazzi	500 m	46.919	3	Did not advance					
Sara Merazzi	1000 m	1:40.850	2 Q	1:35.603	5	Did not advance			
Sara Merazzi	1500 m	—N/a		2:42.755	4	Did not advance			

== Ski jumping ==
Italy qualified four ski jumpers (two per gender).

Individual

Athlete	Event	First round			Final			Total	
Athlete	Event	Distance	Points	Rank	Distance	Points	Rank	Points	Rank
Maximilian Gartner	Men's normal hill	96.0	88.4	13	91.5	82.1	16	170.5	14
Martino Zambenedetti	Men's normal hill	83.0	67.1	25	86.5	71.6	20	138.7	22
Camilla Comazzi	Women's normal hill	70.5	40.0	22	86.0	68.6	15	108.6	19
Noelia Vuerich	Women's normal hill	87.5	69.4	15	81.5	57.4	18	126.8	17

Team

Athlete	Event	First round				Final				Total	
Athlete	Event	Distance	Points	Team points	Rank	Distance	Points	Team points	Rank	Points	Rank
Camilla Comazzi; Martino Zambenedetti; Noelia Vuerich; Maximilian Gartner	Mixed team	94.5; 99.5; 81.5; 88.5	84.9; 100.9; 64.9; 84.9	335.6	7	84.0; 87.5; 92.0; 96.0	78.5; 88.3; 84.7; 102.8	354.3	6	689.9	6

== Snowboarding ==
Snowboard cross
Individual

Athlete	Event	Group heats		Semifinal	Final
Athlete	Event	Points	Rank	Rank	Rank
Federico Casi	Men's snowboard cross	16	5	Did not advance	
Tommaso Costa	Men's snowboard cross	14	6	Did not advance	
Lisa Francesia Boirai	Women's snowboard cross	15	6	Did not advance	
Aurora Drolma Dusi	Women's snowboard cross	13	8	Did not advance	

Mixed

Athlete	Event	Pre-heats	Quarterfinal	Semifinal	Final
Athlete	Event	Position	Position	Position	Position
Federico Casi; Lisa Francesia Boirai	Team snowboard cross	1 Q	1 Q	3 SF	8
Tommaso Costa; Aurora Drolma Dusi	Team snowboard cross	—N/a	3	Did not advance	

Halfpipe, Slopestyle & Big Air

Athlete	Event	Qualification				Final				
Athlete	Event	Run 1	Run 2	Best	Rank	Run 1	Run 2	Run 3	Best	Rank
Felix Fulterer	Men's slopestyle	14.50	14.50	14.50	11	Did not advance				
Felix Fulterer	Men's big air	19.25	25.50	25.50	19	Did not advance				
Gregorio Marchelli	Men's slopestyle	26.25	15.00	26.25	18	Did not advance				
Gregorio Marchelli	Men's big air	68.00	22.50	68.00	11	Did not advance				

== Speed skating ==
Men

Athlete	Event	Time	Rank
John Bernardi	500 m	38.52	15
John Bernardi	1500 m	1:58.06	15
Lorenzo Minari	500 m	37.92	13
Lorenzo Minari	1500 m	1:55.75	9

Women

Athlete	Event	Time	Rank
Giorgia Franceschini	500 m	43.29	23
Giorgia Franceschini	1500 m	2:13.860	18
Noemi Libralesso	500 m	43.09	21
Noemi Libralesso	1500 m	2:08.51	9

Mass Start

Athlete	Event	Semifinal			Final		
Athlete	Event	Points	Time	Rank	Points	Time	Rank
John Bernardi	Men's mass start	3	6:26.86	6 Q	0	5:31.79	10
Lorenzo Minari	Men's mass start	0	5:36.52	10	Did not advance		
Giorgia Franceschini	Women's mass start	4	6:25.86	4 Q	0	6:01.79	14
Noemi Libralesso	Women's mass start	3	6:02.53	7 Q	0	5:55.84	9

Mixed relay

Athlete	Event	Semifinal		Final	
Athlete	Event	Time	Rank	Time	Rank
Lorenzo Minari; Noemi Libralesso	Mixed relay	3:09.81	5	Did not advance	

== See also ==
- Italy at the 2024 Summer Olympics
