= Liu Yishan =

Chinese freestyle skier (born 2007)

Personal information
- Born: 16 February 2007 (age 19) Hebei, China

Sport
- Country: China
- Sport: Freestyle skiing
- Event: Halfpipe
Medal record
Womn's freestyle skiing
Representing China
Winter Youth Olympics
Gold medal – first place	2024 Gangwon	Halfpipe

Liu Yishan (Chinese: 刘奕杉; born 16 February 2007) is a Chinese freestyle skier specializing in halfpipe. She represented China at the 2026 Winter Olympics.

== Career ==
Liu represented China at the 2024 Winter Youth Olympics and won a gold medal in the halfpipe event with a score of 92.25.

In January 2026, she was selected to represent China at the 2026 Winter Olympics.

== Results ==
=== Olympic Winter Games ===
Year	Age	Halfpipe
(Italy) 2026 Milano Cortina	19	9

=== World Championships ===
Year	Age	Halfpipe
(Georgia (country)) 2023 Bakuriani	16	13
(Switzerland) 2025 Engadin	18	8
