= New Zealand at the 2024 Winter Youth Olympics =

- IOC code: NZL
- NOC: New Zealand Olympic Committee

in Gangwon, South Korea 19 January 2024 – 1 February 2024
- Competitors: 22 in 7 sports
- Flag bearers (opening): Jed Nevill & Lucia Georgalli
- Flag bearer (closing): Luke Harrold
- Medals Ranked 17th: Gold 1 Silver 2 Bronze 4 Total 7

Winter Youth Olympics appearances
- 2012; 2016; 2020; 2024

New Zealand competed at the 2024 Winter Youth Olympics in Gangwon, South Korea, from 19 January to 1 February 2024. It was New Zealand's fourth appearance at the Winter Youth Olympic Games, having competed at every Games since the inaugural edition in 2012.

The New Zealand team consisted of 22 athletes (13 men and nine women) competing in seven sports. The flag bearers at the opening ceremony were snowboarder Lucia Georgalli and curler Jed Nevill. Freestyle skier Luke Harrold was the flag bearer at the closing ceremony. With the team winning seven medals—one gold, two silver, and four bronze—the event was New Zealand's most successful Winter Youth Olympics to date.

== Medallists ==
| Medal | Name | Sport | Event | Date |
|---|---|---|---|---|
| Gold | Luke Harrold | Freestyle skiing | Men's halfpipe | 31 January |
| Silver | Lucia Georgalli | Snowboarding | Women's slopestyle | 24 January |
| Silver | Finley Melville Ives | Freestyle skiing | Men's halfpipe | 31 January |
| Bronze | Luke Harrold | Freestyle skiing | Men's big air | 28 January |
| Bronze | Lucia Georgalli | Snowboarding | Women's big air | 28 January |
| Bronze | Campbell Melville Ives | Snowboarding | Men's big air | 28 January |
| Bronze | Dwayne Li | Figure skating | Men's singles | 29 January |

== Competitors ==
The following is the list of number of competitors (per gender) participating at the games per sport/discipline.

| Sport | Men | Women | Total |
|---|---|---|---|
| Alpine skiing | 1 | 2 | 3 |
| Biathlon | 1 | 0 | 1 |
| Curling | 2 | 2 | 4 |
| Figure skating | 1 | 0 | 1 |
| Freestyle skiing | 5 | 2 | 7 |
| Luge | 0 | 1 | 1 |
| Snowboarding | 3 | 2 | 5 |
| Total | 13 | 9 | 22 |

== Alpine skiing ==
New Zealand qualified three alpine skiers (one man and two women).

| Athlete | Event | Run 1 | | Run 2 | | Total | |
| Athlete | Event | Time | Rank | Time | Rank | Time | Rank |
|---|---|---|---|---|---|---|---|
| Ruby Fullerton | Women's slalom | 58.95 | 47 | DNS | | DNF | |
| Ruby Fullerton | Women's giant slalom | 53.25 | 27 | 56.76 | 24 | 1:50.01 | 23 |
| Ruby Fullerton | Women's super-G | 57.56 | 36 | —N/a | | 57.56 | 36 |
| Ruby Fullerton | Women's combined | 1:00.00 | 37 | 59.10 | 29 | 1:59.10 | 29 |
| Hemi Meikle | Men's slalom | 50.54 | 34 | DNF | | DNF | |
| Hemi Meikle | Men's giant slalom | 51.73 | 28 | 47.25 | 19 | 1:38.98 | 22 |
| Hemi Meikle | Men's super-G | 55.23 | 13 | —N/a | | 55.23 | 13 |
| Hemi Meikle | Men's combined | 56.08 | 24 | DNF | | DNF | |
| Charlotte Wiggins | Women's slalom | 55.65 | 37 | 54.82 | 31 | 1:50.47 | 30 |
| Charlotte Wiggins | Women's giant slalom | DNF | | Did not advance | | | |
| Charlotte Wiggins | Women's super-G | 57.39 | 34 | —N/a | | 57.39 | 34 |
| Charlotte Wiggins | Women's combined | 59.69 | 36 | 57.35 | 26 | 1:57.04 | 27 |

== Biathlon ==
| Athlete | Event | Time | Penalties | Rank |
|---|---|---|---|---|
| Baxter Pollard | Men's sprint | 32:02.3 | 8 (5+3) | 95 |
| Baxter Pollard | Men's individual | 1:05:01.7 | 16 (4+5+3+4) | 96 |

== Curling ==
New Zealand qualified a mixed team and mixed doubles pair for a total of six athletes. However, only four athletes were selected (two per gender), with two athletes doubling up in both events.

| Team | Event | Group stage | | | | | | | | Quarterfinal | Semifinal | Final / BM | |
| Team | Event | Opposition Score | Opposition Score | Opposition Score | Opposition Score | Opposition Score | Opposition Score | Opposition Score | Rank | Opposition Score | Opposition Score | Opposition Score | Rank |
|---|---|---|---|---|---|---|---|---|---|---|---|---|---|
| Jed Nevill; Olivia Russell; Jack Steele; Ellie McKenzie | Mixed team | Sweden; L 3–9 | United States; L 4–8 | China; L 1–9 | Nigeria; W 12–1 | Japan; L 2–6 | Norway; L 2–5 | Turkey; L 3–6 | 7 | Did not advance | | | 13 |
| Olivia Russell; Jed Nevill | Mixed doubles | Brazil; W 12–5 | Turkey; L 3–6 | Latvia; L 4–9 | Japan; L 2–11 | China; L 4–12 | —N/a | | 5 | Did not advance | | | 20 |

=== Mixed team ===
| Group A | Skip | W | L | W–L | PF | PA | EW | EL | BE | SE | DSC |
|---|---|---|---|---|---|---|---|---|---|---|---|
| China | Li Zetai | 6 | 1 | 1–0 | 65 | 25 | 28 | 17 | 0 | 12 | 59.04 |
| United States | Kenna Ponzio | 6 | 1 | 0–1 | 68 | 26 | 31 | 16 | 1 | 15 | 51.38 |
| Japan | Kaito Fujii | 5 | 2 | 1–0 | 64 | 26 | 27 | 17 | 2 | 11 | 39.53 |
| Sweden | Vilmer Nygren | 5 | 2 | 0–1 | 55 | 42 | 27 | 19 | 5 | 10 | 58.05 |
| Norway | Alexander Johansen | 3 | 4 | – | 49 | 39 | 25 | 19 | 2 | 11 | 65.33 |
| Turkey | Muhammed Taha Zenit | 2 | 5 | – | 41 | 40 | 16 | 26 | 5 | 5 | 82.17 |
| New Zealand | Jed Nevill | 1 | 6 | – | 27 | 44 | 18 | 23 | 3 | 6 | 86.52 |
| Nigeria | Goodnews Charles | 0 | 7 | – | 6 | 133 | 4 | 39 | 1 | 0 | 199.60 |

Round robin

Draw 1

Saturday, 20 January, 10:00

| Sheet D | 1 | 2 | 3 | 4 | 5 | 6 | 7 | 8 | Final |
| New Zealand (Nevill) | 0 | 0 | 2 | 0 | 0 | 0 | 1 | X | 3 |
| Sweden (Nygren) 🔨 | 0 | 4 | 0 | 1 | 2 | 2 | 0 | X | 9 |

Draw 2

Saturday, 20 January, 18:00

| Sheet C | 1 | 2 | 3 | 4 | 5 | 6 | 7 | 8 | Final |
| New Zealand (Nevill) 🔨 | 0 | 0 | 2 | 0 | 1 | 0 | 1 | X | 4 |
| United States (Ponzio) | 1 | 4 | 0 | 1 | 0 | 2 | 0 | X | 8 |

Draw 3

Sunday, 21 January, 14:00

| Sheet B | 1 | 2 | 3 | 4 | 5 | 6 | 7 | 8 | Final |
| China (Li) 🔨 | 3 | 1 | 3 | 1 | 1 | 0 | X | X | 9 |
| New Zealand (Nevill) | 0 | 0 | 0 | 0 | 0 | 1 | X | X | 1 |

Draw 4

Monday, 22 January, 10:00

| Sheet A | 1 | 2 | 3 | 4 | 5 | 6 | 7 | 8 | Final |
| New Zealand (Nevill) 🔨 | 4 | 2 | 0 | 0 | 2 | 1 | 3 | X | 12 |
| Nigeria (Charles) | 0 | 0 | 0 | 1 | 0 | 0 | 0 | X | 1 |

Draw 5

Monday, 22 January, 18:00

| Sheet C | 1 | 2 | 3 | 4 | 5 | 6 | 7 | 8 | Final |
| Japan (Fujii) | 0 | 0 | 0 | 1 | 4 | 0 | 1 | X | 6 |
| New Zealand (Nevill) 🔨 | 0 | 0 | 1 | 0 | 0 | 1 | 0 | X | 2 |

Draw 6

Tuesday, 23 January, 14:00

| Sheet D | 1 | 2 | 3 | 4 | 5 | 6 | 7 | 8 | Final |
| Norway (Johansen) 🔨 | 0 | 3 | 0 | 1 | 1 | 0 | 0 | X | 5 |
| New Zealand (Nevill) | 0 | 0 | 0 | 0 | 0 | 1 | 1 | X | 2 |

Draw 7

Wednesday, 24 January, 9:00

| Sheet B | 1 | 2 | 3 | 4 | 5 | 6 | 7 | 8 | Final |
| New Zealand (Nevill) | 0 | 0 | 1 | 1 | 1 | 0 | 0 | X | 3 |
| Turkey (Zenit) 🔨 | 0 | 4 | 0 | 0 | 0 | 1 | 1 | X | 6 |

=== Mixed doubles ===
| Group C | W | L | W–L | DSC |
|---|---|---|---|---|
| China | 5 | 0 | – | 56.80 |
| Japan | 4 | 1 | – | 38.84 |
| Latvia | 3 | 2 | – | 77.39 |
| Turkey | 2 | 3 | – | 89.37 |
| New Zealand | 1 | 4 | – | 94.80 |
| Brazil | 0 | 5 | – | 112.92 |

Round robin

Draw 4

Saturday, 27 January, 18:00

| Sheet C | 1 | 2 | 3 | 4 | 5 | 6 | 7 | 8 | Final |
| New Zealand (Russell / Nevill) 🔨 | 2 | 3 | 1 | 0 | 2 | 0 | 4 | X | 12 |
| Brazil (Gentile / Melo) | 0 | 0 | 0 | 1 | 0 | 4 | 0 | X | 5 |

Draw 5

Sunday, 28 January, 10:00

| Sheet A | 1 | 2 | 3 | 4 | 5 | 6 | 7 | 8 | Final |
| Turkey (Ekmekçi / Aybar) | 3 | 0 | 0 | 1 | 1 | 0 | 1 | X | 6 |
| New Zealand (Russell / Nevill) 🔨 | 0 | 1 | 1 | 0 | 0 | 1 | 0 | X | 3 |

Draw 9

Monday, 29 January, 14:00

| Sheet D | 1 | 2 | 3 | 4 | 5 | 6 | 7 | 8 | Final |
| New Zealand (Russell / Nevill) | 0 | 1 | 0 | 1 | 0 | 2 | 0 | X | 4 |
| Latvia (Regža / Zass) 🔨 | 2 | 0 | 2 | 0 | 2 | 0 | 3 | X | 9 |

Draw 12

Tuesday, 30 January, 14:00

| Sheet D | 1 | 2 | 3 | 4 | 5 | 6 | 7 | 8 | Final |
| Japan (Tanaka / Kawai) 🔨 | 3 | 0 | 1 | 1 | 0 | 4 | 2 | X | 11 |
| New Zealand (Russell / Nevill) | 0 | 1 | 0 | 0 | 1 | 0 | 0 | X | 2 |

Draw 14

Wednesday, 31 January, 9:00

| Sheet B | 1 | 2 | 3 | 4 | 5 | 6 | 7 | 8 | Final |
| New Zealand (Russell / Nevill) | 0 | 0 | 3 | 0 | 1 | 0 | X | X | 4 |
| China (Gong / Xu) 🔨 | 6 | 3 | 0 | 1 | 0 | 2 | X | X | 12 |

== Figure skating ==
| Athlete | Event | SP | | FS | | Total | |
| Athlete | Event | Points | Rank | Points | Rank | Points | Rank |
|---|---|---|---|---|---|---|---|
| Dwayne Li | Men's singles | 68.01 | 4 | 140.83 | 4 | 208.84 | 3rd place, bronze medalist(s) |

== Freestyle skiing ==
Freeski

| Athlete | Event | Qualification | | | | Final | | | | |
| Athlete | Event | Run 1 | Run 2 | Best | Rank | Run 1 | Run 2 | Run 3 | Best / Total | Rank |
|---|---|---|---|---|---|---|---|---|---|---|
| Hamish Barlow | Men's slopestyle | 19.50 | 44.25 | 44.25 | 18 | Did not advance | | | | |
| Hamish Barlow | Men's big air | 59.25 | 56.25 | 59.25 | 17 | Did not advance | | | | |
| Madeleine Disbrowe | Women's slopestyle | 65.25 | 63.25 | 65.25 | 8 Q | 34.75 | 43.50 | 14.00 | 43.50 | 9 |
| Madeleine Disbrowe | Women's big air | DNS | | | | Did not advance | | | | |
| Luke Harrold | Men's halfpipe | 88.00 | 89.25 | 89.25 | 2 Q | 94.25 | 25.75 | 85.50 | 94.25 | 1st place, gold medalist(s) |
| Luke Harrold | Men's slopestyle | 61.00 | 81.75 | 81.75 | 5 Q | 51.75 | 62.50 | 65.25 | 65.25 | 6 |
| Luke Harrold | Men's big air | 89.75 | 32.75 | 89.75 | 4 Q | 84.25 | 88.00 | 25.25 | 172.25 | 3rd place, bronze medalist(s) |
| Finley Melville Ives | Men's halfpipe | 81.75 | 92.00 | 92.00 | 1 Q | 92.50 | 55.25 | 42.00 | 92.50 | 2nd place, silver medalist(s) |
| Finley Melville Ives | Men's slopestyle | 20.75 | DNS | 20.75 | 23 | Did not advance | | | | |
| Finley Melville Ives | Men's big air | DNS | | | | Did not advance | | | | |
| Liam Richards | Men's halfpipe | 50.50 | 62.00 | 62.00 | 7 Q | 70.25 | 16.50 | 20.75 | 70.25 | 7 |
| Mischa Thomas | Women's slopestyle | 70.50 | 77.75 | 77.75 | 4 Q | DNS | | | | 10 |
| Mischa Thomas | Women's big air | DNS | | | | Did not advance | | | | |

Ski cross

| Athlete | Event | Group heats | | | | | | | Semifinal | Final | |
| Athlete | Event | Opposition Points | Opposition Points | Opposition Points | Opposition Points | Opposition Points | Total points | Rank | Opposition Position | Opposition Position | Rank |
|---|---|---|---|---|---|---|---|---|---|---|---|
| Campbell Appel | Men's ski cross | Lee (KOR); Sadler (AUS); Lechner (ITA); 4 | Abersten (SWE); Rybar (SVK) – 3 | Young Shing (SWE); Yu (KOR) – 3 | Robinson (USA); Johnston (CAN); Tresnak (CZE); 1 | England (USA); Dade (GBR); Looze (SUI); 2 | 13 | 8 | Did not advance | | |

== Luge ==
New Zealand qualified one female luger.

| Athlete | Event | Run 1 | | Run 2 | | Total | |
| Athlete | Event | Time | Rank | Time | Rank | Time | Rank |
|---|---|---|---|---|---|---|---|
| Maggie Dowling | Women's singles | 50.256 | 22 | 50.051 | 20 | 1:40.307 | 21 |

== Snowboarding ==
| Athlete | Event | Qualification | | | | Final | | | | |
| Athlete | Event | Run 1 | Run 2 | Best | Rank | Run 1 | Run 2 | Run 3 | Best | Rank |
|---|---|---|---|---|---|---|---|---|---|---|
| Ava Beer | Women's halfpipe | 35.00 | 33.00 | 35.00 | 14 | Did not advance | | | | |
| Ava Beer | Women's slopestyle | 76.50 | 21.00 | 76.50 | 4 Q | 22.50 | 25.75 | 6.75 | 25.75 | 10 |
| Ava Beer | Women's big air | 85.25 | 86.25 | 86.25 | 3 Q | 20.00 | 67.25 | 17.50 | 84.75 | 10 |
| Lucia Georgalli | Women's slopestyle | 80.75 | 83.25 | 83.25 | 3 Q | 19.75 | 22.00 | 88.25 | 88.25 | 2nd place, silver medalist(s) |
| Lucia Georgalli | Women's big air | 65.75 | 83.00 | 83.00 | 5 Q | 79.25 | 39.75 | 72.75 | 152.00 | 3rd place, bronze medalist(s) |
| Joshua Li | Men's slopestyle | 31.75 | 22.25 | 31.75 | 16 | Did not advance | | | | |
| Txema Mazet-Brown | Men's slopestyle | 4.00 | 18.50 | 18.50 | 19 | Did not advance | | | | |
| Txema Mazet-Brown | Men's big air | 84.75 | 25.25 | 84.75 | 5 Q | 21.75 | 17.50 | 21.50 | 21.75 | 9 |
| Campbell Melville Ives | Men's halfpipe | 75.75 | 43.00 | 75.75 | 5 Q | 81.50 | 68.50 | 77.50 | 81.50 | 4 |
| Campbell Melville Ives | Men's slopestyle | 57.25 | 80.00 | 80.00 | 2 Q | 71.00 | 30.75 | 89.00 | 89.00 | 4 |
| Campbell Melville Ives | Men's big air | 88.00 | 16.00 | 88.00 | 4 Q | 82.75 | 70.25 | 25.00 | 153.00 | 3rd place, bronze medalist(s) |

== Officials ==
- Chef de Mission – Marty Toomey

== See also ==
- New Zealand at the 2024 Summer Olympics
