= Snowboarding at the 2024 Winter Youth Olympics – Women's slopestyle =

Women's slopestyle at the IV Winter Youth Olympic Games
- Venue: Welli Hilli Park
- Dates: 24 January
- Competitors: 20 from 12 nations
- Winning points: 89.00

Medalists
1st place, gold medalist(s)		Hanna Karrer	Austria
2nd place, silver medalist(s)		Lucia Georgalli	New Zealand
3rd place, bronze medalist(s)		Vanessa Volopichová	Czech Republic

The women's slopestyle event in snowboarding at the 2024 Winter Youth Olympics took place on 24 January at the Welli Hilli Park.

== Qualification ==
The qualification was started at 9:45.

Rank	Bib	Name	Country	Run 1	Run 2	Best	Notes
1	9	Yura Murase	Japan	49.50	93.00	93.00	Q
2	2	Rebecca Flynn	United States	70.75	84.00	84.00	Q
3	1	Lucia Georgalli	New Zealand	80.75	83.25	83.25	Q
4	7	Ava Beer	New Zealand	76.50	21.00	76.50	Q
5	4	Amalia Pelchat	Canada	56.25	66.00	66.00	Q
6	13	Hanna Karrer	Austria	17.25	63.25	63.25	Q
7	6	Vanessa Volopichová	Czech Republic	32.00	61.75	61.75	Q
8	8	Katja Dutu	Netherlands	60.50	54.25	60.50	Q
9	10	Ally Hickman	Australia	53.75	28.50	53.75	Q
10	11	Sam van Lieshout	Netherlands	46.25	30.25	46.25	Q
11	18	Zhang Xiaonan	China	27.25	43.25	43.25	
12	12	Olivia Lisle	United States	16.75	40.25	40.25	
13	15	Laura Anga	Estonia	9.25	36.00	36.00	
14	14	Avery Spalding	Canada	34.00	25.50	34.00	
15	22	Choi Seo-woo	South Korea	2.00	29.75	29.75	
16	16	Triinu Marta Oidermaa	Estonia	13.25	28.50	28.50	
17	3	Kiara Morii	Japan	25.75	20.50	25.75	
18	17	Halle McRae	Australia	10.25	21.50	21.50	
19	19	Amenah Al-Muhairi	United Arab Emirates	4.00	6.00	6.00	
	5	Yu Seung-eun	South Korea	DNS			

== Final ==
The final was started at 14:51.

Rank	Bib	Name	Country	Run 1	Run 2	Run 3	Total
1st place, gold medalist(s)	13	Hanna Karrer	Austria	61.50	89.00	26.75	89.00
2nd place, silver medalist(s)	1	Lucia Georgalli	New Zealand	19.75	22.00	88.25	88.25
3rd place, bronze medalist(s)	6	Vanessa Volopichová	Czech Republic	64.25	87.00	35.75	87.00
4	2	Rebecca Flynn	United States	58.00	81.25	22.25	81.25
5	9	Yura Murase	Japan	24.00	10.00	79.25	79.25
6	8	Katja Dutu	Netherlands	75.25	19.00	17.00	75.25
7	11	Sam van Lieshout	Netherlands	71.25	41.25	14.75	71.25
8	10	Ally Hickman	Australia	16.25	50.75	61.00	61.00
9	4	Amalia Pelchat	Canada	53.50	29.50	23.25	53.50
10	7	Ava Beer	New Zealand	22.50	25.75	6.75	25.75
