= Freestyle skiing at the 2024 Winter Youth Olympics =

Freestyle skiing at the IV Winter Youth Olympic Games
- Venue: High1 Resort; Welli Hilli Park
- Dates: 23–31 January
- Competitors: 172

Freestyle skiing at the 2024 Winter Youth Olympics took place from 23 to 31 January 2024, with the dual moguls event held at the High1 Resort, Jeongseon, South Korea and the remaining events at Welli Hilli Park, Hoengseong, South Korea.

== Schedule ==
All times are in KST (UTC+9)

Date	Time	Event
23 January	11:00	Men's/Women's ski cross
24 January	09:45	Women's slopestyle
24 January	10:45	Mixed team ski cross
25 January	09:45	Men's slopestyle
26 January	13:00	Mixed team dual moguls
27 January	10:15	Men's/Women's big air qualification
27 January	13:00	Men's/Women's dual moguls
28 January	10:15	Men's/Women's big air
31 January	10:15	Men's/Women's halfpipe

== Events ==
=== Medal table ===
* Host nation (South Korea)

Rank	Nation	Gold	Silver	Bronze	Total
1	United States	3	3	3	9
2	Sweden	2	0	1	3
3	Italy	2	0	0	2
4	China	1	2	0	3
5	New Zealand	1	1	1	3
6	South Korea*	1	1	0	2
7	Germany	1	0	2	3
8	Canada	1	0	0	1
9	Japan	0	2	1	3
10	Australia	0	2	0	2
11	Austria	0	1	0	1
12	Switzerland	0	0	3	3
13	Finland	0	0	1	1
Totals (13 entries)		12	12	12	36

=== Men's events ===
Event	Gold		Silver		Bronze	
Big air	Charlie Beatty; Canada	177.75	Olly Nicholls; Japan	174.50	Luke Harrold; New Zealand	172.25
Halfpipe	Luke Harrold; New Zealand	94.25	Finley Melville Ives; New Zealand	92.50	Alan Bornet; Switzerland	85.00
Slopestyle	Henry Townshend; United States	90.25	Olly Nicholls; Japan	85.75	Jaakko Koskinen; Finland	83.75
Dual moguls	Lee Yoon-seung; South Korea		Porter Huff; United States		Takuto Nakamura; Japan	
Ski cross	Niklas Höller; Germany		Janik Sommerer; Austria		Måns Abersten; Sweden	

=== Women's events ===
Event	Gold		Silver		Bronze	
Big air	Flora Tabanelli; Italy	180.00	Daisy Thomas; Australia	172.75	Muriel Mohr; Germany	166.00
Halfpipe	Liu Yishan; China	92.25	Chen Zihan; China	83.75	Kate Gray; United States	79.25
Slopestyle	Flora Tabanelli; Italy	90.50	Han Linshan; China	81.50	Muriel Mohr; Germany	78.75
Dual moguls	Elizabeth Lemley; United States		Lottie Lodge; Australia		Abby McLarnon; United States	
Ski cross	Uma Kruse Een; Sweden		Morgan Shute; United States		Leena Thommen; Switzerland	

=== Mixed events ===
Event	Gold	Silver	Bronze
Team dual moguls	United States; Elizabeth Lemley; Porter Huff	South Korea; Yun Shin-ee; Lee Yoon-seung	United States; Abby McLarnon; Jiah Cohen
Team ski cross	Sweden; William Young Shing; Alexandra Nilsson	United States; Walker Robinson; Morgan Shute	Switzerland; Lorenzo Rosset; Valentine Lagger

== Qualification ==
NOCs can gain quota places per gender via the 2023 FIS Freestyle Junior World Ski Championships. Furthermore, the remaining NOCs would get quota places via the YOG FIS points' lists as of 18 December 2023.

=== Summary ===
This is the quota list as of December 18, 2023.

NOC	Men				Women				Total
NOC	DM	HP	SS/BA	SX	DM	HP	SS/BA	SX	Total
Argentina			1						1
Australia	1		1	1	1		2	2	8
Austria				2				2	4
Belgium				1					1
Canada	2	2	2	2	2		1	2	13
Chile			1	2				2	5
China	1	2	~~1~~ 0		1	2	2		8
Czech Republic	1		1	2	1			2	7
Estonia						1	1		2
Finland	1		2				1		4
France	1		1	~~2~~ 0	1		2	~~2~~ 0	5
Germany			~~2~~ 1	2	2		~~2~~ 1	2	8
Great Britain	~~2~~ 0			2				1	3
Greece							1		1
Hungary				1				2	3
Ireland	1				~~2~~ 0				1
Italy				2	1		~~2~~ 1	~~2~~ 1	5
Japan	1	~~2~~ 1	1	1	2		~~2~~ 1	2	9
Kazakhstan	1				1				2
Lithuania			1				1		2
New Zealand		2	2	1		~~2~~ 0	2		7
Norway			2				~~1~~ 0		2
Philippines							1		1
Slovakia				1				1	2
Slovenia				~~1~~ 0				~~1~~ 0	0
South Africa					~~1~~ 0				0
South Korea	2	2	2	2	2	~~2~~ 1	~~2~~ 0	~~2~~ 0	11
Spain	~~2~~ 1								1
Sweden	2			2	2			2	8
Switzerland	2	2	2	2		1		2	11
Thailand					1				1
Ukraine	1		~~1~~ 0		1		2		4
United Arab Emirates							1		1
United States	2	2	2	2	2	2	2	2	16
Total: 31 NOCs	20	13	22	28	20	7	22	25	157

=== Next eligible NOC per event ===
A country can be eligible for more than one quota spot per event in the reallocation process. Bolded NOCs have accepted quotas while NOCs with a strike through have already passed.

Women

Dual Moguls	Halfpipe	Slopestyle/Big Air	Ski Cross
~~Netherlands~~; **Kazakhstan**; **Thailand**; **Ukraine**; Great Britain		~~Argentina~~; **Greece**; ~~Netherlands~~; ~~Switzerland~~; **United Arab Emirates**; **Canada**; **Philippines**; ~~Sweden~~; ~~Spain~~; ~~Denmark~~; ~~Latvia~~; **Ukraine**; ~~Argentina~~; **France**	**Hungary**; ~~Great Britain~~; **Japan**; **Austria**

Men

Dual Moguls	Halfpipe	Slopestyle/Big Air	Ski Cross
**Czech Republic**; **Ukraine**; **Ireland**; Germany; Netherlands		**Czech Republic**; **Lithuania**; **Chile**; Croatia; Slovenia	**Hungary**; ~~Netherlands~~; **United States**; **Chile**; Australia
