= Snowboarding at the 2024 Winter Youth Olympics – Women's big air =

Women's big air at the IV Winter Youth Olympic Games
- Venue: Welli Hilli Park
- Dates: 27–28 January
- Competitors: 20 from 13 nations
- Winning points: 154.25

Medalists
1st place, gold medalist(s)		Yura Murase	Japan
2nd place, silver medalist(s)		Rebecca Flynn	United States
3rd place, bronze medalist(s)		Lucia Georgalli	New Zealand

The women's big air event in snowboarding at the 2024 Winter Youth Olympics took place on 27 and 28 January at the Welli Hilli Park.

== Qualification ==
The qualification was started at 10:15.

Rank	Bib	Name	Country	Run 1	Run 2	Best	Notes
1	9	Hanna Karrer	Austria	92.00	25.50	92.00	Q
2	4	Rebecca Flynn	United States	86.75	89.50	89.50	Q
3	6	Ava Beer	New Zealand	85.25	86.25	86.25	Q
4	1	Kiara Morii	Japan	84.25	25.50	84.25	Q
5	3	Lucia Georgalli	New Zealand	65.75	83.00	83.00	Q
6	10	Yura Murase	Japan	82.00	33.25	82.00	Q
7	11	Ally Hickman	Australia	19.25	78.75	78.75	Q
8	7	Katja Dutu	Netherlands	74.50	70.00	74.50	Q
9	17	Zhang Xiaonan	China	73.25	29.00	73.25	Q
10	2	Vanessa Volopichová	Czech Republic	72.00	71.75	72.00	Q
11	18	Halle McRae	Australia	14.75	64.00	64.00	
12	8	Sam van Lieshout	Netherlands	15.75	61.75	61.75	
13	14	Laura Anga	Estonia	58.25	22.25	58.25	
14	16	Triinu Marta Oidermaa	Estonia	47.50	52.75	52.75	
15	19	Choi Seo-woo	South Korea	41.50	49.25	49.25	
16	13	Avery Spalding	Canada	13.00	37.00	37.00	
17	5	Amalia Pelchat	Canada	21.00	30.75	30.75	
18	15	Amenah Al-Muhairi	United Arab Emirates	29.75	14.50	29.75	
19	12	Olivia Lisle	United States	8.25	DNS	8.25	
20	20	Júlíetta Iðunn Tómasdóttir	Iceland	DNS			

== Final ==
The final was started at 13:55.

Rank	Bib	Name	Country	Run 1	Run 2	Run 3	Total
1st place, gold medalist(s)	10	Yura Murase	Japan	66.00	79.50	74.75	154.25
2nd place, silver medalist(s)	4	Rebecca Flynn	United States	78.00	75.00	73.50	153.00
3rd place, bronze medalist(s)	3	Lucia Georgalli	New Zealand	79.25	39.75	72.75	152.00
4	1	Kiara Morii	Japan	78.75	72.50	21.50	151.25
5	2	Vanessa Volopichová	Czech Republic	69.25	78.50	72.00	150.50
6	9	Hanna Karrer	Austria	84.75	62.00	18.75	146.75
7	7	Katja Dutu	Netherlands	75.75	20.00	68.50	144.25
8	17	Zhang Xiaonan	China	78.25	12.50	63.50	141.75
9	11	Ally Hickman	Australia	59.75	26.50	66.00	125.75
10	6	Ava Beer	New Zealand	20.00	67.25	17.50	84.75
