= Freestyle skiing at the 2024 Winter Youth Olympics – Men's slopestyle =

Men's slopestyle at the IV Winter Youth Olympic Games
- Venue: Welli Hilli Park
- Dates: 25 January
- Competitors: 24 from 15 nations

Medalists
1st place, gold medalist(s)		Henry Townshend	United States
2nd place, silver medalist(s)		Olly Nicholls	Japan
3rd place, bronze medalist(s)		Jaakko Koskinen	Finland

The men's slopestyle event in freestyle skiing at the 2024 Winter Youth Olympics took place on 25 January at the Welli Hilli Park.

== Qualification ==
The qualification was started at 09:45.

Rank	Bib	Name	Country	Run 1	Run 2	Best	Notes
1	1	Charlie Beatty	Canada	24.50	92.25	92.25	Q
2	3	Viktor Alexander Maksyagin	Switzerland	47.50	89.25	89.25	Q
3	11	Lars Ruchti	Switzerland	27.75	87.75	87.75	Q
4	17	Petr Muller	Czech Republic	86.75	80.00	86.75	Q
5	4	Luke Harrold	New Zealand	61.00	81.75	81.75	Q
6	10	Jaakko Koskinen	Finland	69.50	80.00	80.00	Q
7	9	Henry Townshend	United States	76.25	78.00	78.00	Q
8	22	Alois Panchaud	Switzerland	74.50	71.75	74.50	Q
9	14	Olly Nicholls	Japan	10.50	73.50	73.50	Q
10	18	Matthew Lepine	Canada	72.75	25.25	72.75	Q
11	21	Pijus Baniulis	Lithuania	65.00	23.25	65.00	
12	19	Timothé Roch	France	35.00	61.50	61.50	
13	20	Joey Elliss	Australia	31.00	59.00	59.00	
14	13	Theodor Skarpnord	Norway	55.75	2.50	55.75	
15	23	Lee Seo-jun	South Korea	54.00	2.00	54.00	
16	8	Leon Lorenzini	Chile	38.50	53.50	53.50	
17	5	Filip Stene-Johansen	Norway	52.75	33.00	52.75	
18	12	Hamish Barlow	New Zealand	19.50	44.25	44.25	
19	2	Jack Rodeheaver	United States	31.75	32.75	32.75	
20	16	Santiago Magni	Argentina	30.00	8.00	30.00	
21	24	Brendon Choi	South Korea	5.25	29.25	29.25	
22	15	Hannes Baumhöfener	Germany	17.75	23.75	23.75	
23	7	Finley Melville-Ives	New Zealand	20.75	DNS	20.75	
24	6	Aimo Mandelin	Finland	7.25	6.75	7.25	

== Final ==
The final was started at 12:30.

Rank	Start order	Bib	Name	Country	Run 1	Run 2	Run 3	Total
1st place, gold medalist(s)	4	9	Henry Townshend	United States	90.25	26.25	80.25	90.25
2nd place, silver medalist(s)	2	14	Olly Nicholls	Japan	71.00	36.50	85.75	85.75
3rd place, bronze medalist(s)	5	10	Jaakko Koskinen	Finland	82.75	78.25	83.75	83.75
4	9	3	Viktor Alexander Maksyagin	Switzerland	76.25	50.00	28.25	76.25
5	7	17	Petr Muller	Czech Republic	65.50	67.75	59.75	67.75
6	6	4	Luke Harrold	New Zealand	51.75	62.50	65.25	65.25
7	8	11	Lars Ruchti	Switzerland	63.00	42.00	55.00	63.00
8	1	18	Matthew Lepine	Canada	45.50	62.25	19.50	62.25
9	3	22	Alois Panchaud	Switzerland	61.75	33.75	32.00	61.75
10	10	1	Charlie Beatty	Canada	33.50	13.75	37.75	37.75
