= Germany at the 2024 Winter Youth Olympics =

- Flag of Germany
- IOC code: GER
- NOC: Deutscher Olympischer Sportbund
- Website: www.dosb.de

in Gangwon, South Korea 19 January 2024 – 1 February 2024
- Competitors: 90 in 15 sports
- Flag bearers (opening): Felix Schwenkel & Hanna Beck
- Flag bearer (closing): TBD
- Medals Ranked 2nd: Gold 9 Silver 5 Bronze 6 Total 20

Winter Youth Olympics appearances
- 2012; 2016; 2020; 2024

Germany is scheduled to compete at the 2024 Winter Youth Olympics in Gangwon, South Korea, from January 19 to February 1, 2024. This will be Germany's fourth appearance at the Winter Youth Olympic Games, having competed at every Games since the inaugural edition in 2012.

Snowboarder Felix Schwenkel and biathlete Hanna Beck were the country's flagbearers during the opening ceremony.

== Competitors ==
The following is the list of number of competitors participating at the Games per sport/discipline.

Sport	Men	Women	Total
Alpine skiing	3	3	6
Biathlon	4	4	8
Bobsleigh	3	0	3
Cross-country skiing	3	3	6
Curling	3	3	6
Figure skating	1	1	2
Freestyle skiing	3	4	7
Ice hockey	0	18	18
Luge	5	6	11
Nordic combined	2	2	4
Short track speed skating	1	1	2
Skeleton	2	2	4
Ski jumping	2	2	4
Snowboarding	2	3	5
Speed skating	2	2	4
Total	36	54	90

== Medalists ==
Medal	Name	Sport	Event	Date
Gold	Antonia Pietschmann	Luge	Women's singles	20 January
Gold	Benno Brandis	Alpine skiing	Men's super-G	21 January
Gold	Finn Sonnekalb	Speed skating	Men's 500 metres	22 January
Gold	Maria Votz	Skeleton	Women's	22 January
Gold	Finn Sonnekalb	Speed skating	Men's 1500 metres	23 January
Gold	Niklas Höller	Freestyle skiing	Men's ski cross	23 January
Gold	Finn Sonnekalb	Speed skating	Men's mass start	26 January
Gold	Jakob Moch	Cross-country skiing	Men's 7.5 km classical	30 January
Gold	Sarah Hofmann; Jonas Müller; Jakob Moch	Cross-country skiing	4 × 5 kilometres mixes relay	1 February
Silver	Marie Keudel	Biathlon	Women's individual	20 January
Silver	Marie Keudel; Korbinian Kübler	Biathlon	Single mixed relay	21 January
Silver	Charlotte Grandinger	Alpine skiing	Women's slalom	25 January
Silver	Jakob Moch	Cross-country skiing	Men's sprint	29 January
Silver	Jonas Müller	Cross-country skiing	Men's 7.5 km classical	30 January
Bronze	Louis Grünbeck; Maximilian Kührt	Luge	Men's doubles	20 January
Bronze	Romy Ertl	Alpine skiing	Women's combined	22 January
Bronze	Muriel Mohr	Freestyle skiing	Women's slopestyle	24 January
Bronze	Muriel Mohr	Freestyle skiing	Women's big air	28 January
Bronze	Jonathan Gräbert	Nordic combined	Men's individual normal hill/6 km	29 January
Bronze	Germany women's national under-16 ice hockey team	Ice hockey	Women's tournament	31 January

== Alpine skiing ==
Germany received 3 male and 3 female quota.

Men

Athlete	Event	Run 1		Run 2		Total	
Athlete	Event	Time	Rank	Time	Rank	Time	Rank
Benno Brandis	Super-G	—N/a				54.42	1st place, gold medalist(s)
Benno Brandis	Giant slalom	50.02	10	DNF			
Benno Brandis	Slalom	DNF					
Benno Brandis	Combined	54.47	3	DNF			
Lars Horvath	Super-G|	—N/a				56.03	23
Lars Horvath	Giant slalom	50.97	20	46.70	16	1:37.67	16
Lars Horvath	Slalom	48.26	11	DQ			
Lars Horvath	Combined	55.95	21	54.95	4	1:50.90	10
Leo Scherer	Super-G	—N/a				55.36	14
Leo Scherer	Giant slalom	50.22	11	45.72	3	1:35.94	4
Leo Scherer	Slalom	47.59	7	52.72	7	1:40.31	6
Leo Scherer	Combined	54.92	8	56.10	15	1:51.02	11

Women

Athlete	Event	Run 1		Run 2		Total	
Athlete	Event	Time	Rank	Time	Rank	Time	Rank
Romy Ertl	Super-G	—N/a				54.89	13
Romy Ertl	Giant slalom	48.99	4	53.86	9	1:42.85	8
Romy Ertl	Slalom	50.46	5	DNF			
Romy Ertl	Combined	56.85	8	51.97	5	1:48.82	3rd place, bronze medalist(s)
Charlotte Grandinger	Super-G	—N/a				DNF	
Charlotte Grandinger	Giant slalom	DNF					
Charlotte Grandinger	Slalom	50.14	4	47.94	1	1:38.08	2nd place, silver medalist(s)
Charlotte Grandinger	Combined	DNF					
Antonia Reischl	Super-G	—N/a				54.51	11
Antonia Reischl	Giant slalom	DNF					
Antonia Reischl	Slalom	51.90	15	50.09	18	1:41.99	16
Antonia Reischl	Combined	56.84	7	53.13	12	1:49.97	7

Mixed

Athlete	Event	Round of 16	Quarterfinals	Semifinals	Final / BM	
Athlete	Event	Opposition Result	Opposition Result	Opposition Result	Opposition Result	Rank
Romy Ertl; Leo Scherer	Parallel mixed team	Poland; W 2–2*	Austria; L 1–3	Did not advance		

== Biathlon ==
Germany received 4 quota in each gender after finishing in the top 10 of the Nations Cup in the 2022–23 Biathlon World Cup.

Men

Athlete	Event	Time	Misses	Rank
Björn Ole Hederich	Sprint	22:40.9	2 (1+1)	10
Björn Ole Hederich	Individual	43:56.1	3 (0+1+0+2)	7
Korbinian Kübler	Sprint	25:16.7	6 (4+2)	65
Korbinian Kübler	Individual	44:13.5	5 (0+0+2+3)	9
Lukas Tannheimer	Sprint	23:20.0	4 (2+2)	19
Lukas Tannheimer	Individual	48:25.4	8 (1+1+4+2)	43
Finn Zurnieden	Sprint	23:57.1	4 (2+2)	31
Finn Zurnieden	Individual	44:39.8	4 (1+2+0+1)	13

Women

Athlete	Event	Time	Misses	Rank
Hanna Beck	Sprint	21:41.5	2 (1+1)	14
Hanna Beck	Individual	41:27.4	5 (1+2+0+2)	21
Lena Marie Dietersberger	Sprint	24:22.1	6 (3+3)	49
Lena Marie Dietersberger	Individual	40:45.0	3 (1+0+0+2)	15
Jana Duffner	Sprint	23:48.6	6 (3+3)	38
Jana Duffner	Individual	44:24.4	8 (0+3+1+4)	48
Marie Keudel	Sprint	21:30.5	3 (2+1)	11
Marie Keudel	Individual	38:13.1	2 (0+0+1+1)	2nd place, silver medalist(s)

Mixed

Athletes	Event	Time	Misses	Rank
Marie Keudel; Korbinian Kübler	Single mixed relay	44:58.2	6 (0+6)	2nd place, silver medalist(s)
Marie Keudel; Hanna Beck; Lukas Tannheimer; Björn Ole Hederich	Mixed relay	1:20:10.4	17 (3+14)	5

== Bobsleigh ==
Germany received 3 quota in men's bobsleigh via the IBSF Youth Olympics Ranking List.

Athlete	Event	Run 1		Run 2		Total	
Athlete	Event	Time	Rank	Time	Rank	Time	Rank
Tillmann Hecking	Men's	55.11	4	56.05	10	1:51.16	8
Julian Klein	Men's	55.18	6	55.38	4	1:50.56	4
Ben Mielke	Men's	56.05	14	55.95	8	1:52.00	11

== Cross-country skiing ==
Germany received 3 male and 3 female quota.

Men

Athlete	Event	Qualification		Quarterfinal		Semifinal		Final	
Athlete	Event	Time	Rank	Time	Rank	Time	Rank	Time	Rank
Jakob Moch	7.5 km classical	—N/a						19:47.2	1st place, gold medalist(s)
Jakob Moch	Sprint freestyle	3:05.23	4 Q	3:08.46	1 Q	3:10.63	2 Q	3:16.60	2nd place, silver medalist(s)
Jonas Müller	7.5 km classical	—N/a						19:52.6	2nd place, silver medalist(s)
Jonas Müller	Sprint freestyle	3:09.44	17 Q	3:09.61	3	Did not advance			
Milan Neukirchner	7.5 km classical	—N/a						20:47.1	17
Milan Neukirchner	Sprint freestyle	3:08.59	12 Q	3:04.40	1 Q	3:09.57	1 Q	3:18.99	4

Women

Athlete	Event	Qualification		Quarterfinal		Semifinal		Final	
Athlete	Event	Time	Rank	Time	Rank	Time	Rank	Time	Rank
Lena Einsiedler	7.5 km classical	—N/a						23:21.3	15
Lena Einsiedler	Sprint freestyle	3:32.16	4 Q	3:40.48	2 Q	3:39.54	4	Did not advance	
Sarah Hofmann	7.5 km classical	—N/a						22:44.4	5
Sarah Hofmann	Sprint freestyle	3:38.42	12 Q	3:37.36	2 Q	3:37.85	4 LL	3:41.52	4
Hannah Lorenz	7.5 km classical	—N/a						23:14.3	12
Hannah Lorenz	Sprint freestyle	3:49.64	30 Q	3:50.83	6	Did not advance			

Mixed

Athlete	Event	Time	Rank
Sarah Hofmann; Jonas Müller; Lena Einsiedler; Jakob Moch	Mixed relay	53:07.3	1st place, gold medalist(s)

== Curling ==
Germany qualified a mixed team and a mixed doubles team, by finishing in the top European teams at the 2022–23 World Junior Curling Championships.

Summary

Team	Event	Group Stage								Quarterfinal	Semifinal	Final / BM	
Team	Event	Opposition Score	Opposition Score	Opposition Score	Opposition Score	Opposition Score	Opposition Score	Opposition Score	Rank	Opposition Score	Opposition Score	Opposition Score	Rank
Lukas Jäger; Emma Waltenberger; David Fuß; Annelie Abdel Halim	Mixed team	Switzerland; L 2–11	Great Britain; W 7–4	Italy; L 5–7	Brazil; L 4–6	Canada; L 2–5	Denmark; L 6–7	South Korea; L 4–6	8	Did not advance			15
Joy Sutor; Leonhard Angrick	Mixed doubles	Austria; W 9–5	Switzerland; W 9–6	Kazakhstan; W 8–4	Italy; W 8–2	Denmark; L 4–9	—N/a		2 Q	Great Britain; L 5–7	Did not advance		6

=== Mixed team ===
Group B	Skip	W	L	W–L	PF	PA	EW	EL	BE	SE	DSC
Great Britain	Logan Carson	6	1	–	44	30	26	21	4	7	51.75
Denmark	Jacob Schmidt	5	2	–	48	28	27	20	2	9	34.70
Switzerland	Nathan Dryburgh	4	3	2–0	52	35	25	23	5	7	39.96
Italy	Andrea Gilli	4	3	1–1	46	38	29	23	3	7	50.58
South Korea	Kim Dae-hyun	4	3	0–2	48	33	24	22	3	8	109.88
Canada	Nathan Gray	3	4	–	40	34	24	20	3	11	35.43
Brazil	Pedro Ribeiro	1	6	1–0	17	81	13	31	0	2	103.39
Germany	Lukas Jäger	1	6	0–1	30	46	19	27	2	5	68.51

Round robin

Draw 1

Saturday, January 20, 14:00

Sheet B	1	2	3	4	5	6	7	8	Final
Germany (Jäger)	0	0	0	1	0	1	0	X	2
Switzerland (Dryburgh) 🔨	0	3	2	0	4	0	2	X	11

Draw 2

Sunday, January 21, 10:00

Sheet D	1	2	3	4	5	6	7	8	Final
Germany (Jäger) 🔨	2	0	0	0	2	0	2	1	7
Great Britain (Carson)	0	0	1	1	0	2	0	0	4

Draw 3

Sunday, January 21, 18:00

Sheet A	1	2	3	4	5	6	7	8	Final
Germany (Jäger) 🔨	0	1	0	0	2	0	2	0	5
Italy (Gilli)	1	0	1	2	0	2	0	1	7

Draw 4

Monday, January 22, 14:00

Sheet B	1	2	3	4	5	6	7	8	Final
Brazil (Ribeiro)	0	0	1	1	0	2	0	2	6
Germany (Jäger) 🔨	1	1	0	0	1	0	1	0	4

Draw 5

Tuesday, January 23, 10:00

Sheet C	1	2	3	4	5	6	7	8	Final
Germany (Jäger)	0	0	0	0	2	0	0	X	2
Canada (Gray) 🔨	1	1	3	0	0	0	0	X	5

Draw 6

Tuesday, January 23, 18:00

Sheet A	1	2	3	4	5	6	7	8	Final
Denmark (Schmidt) 🔨	0	0	0	0	2	2	1	2	7
Germany (Jäger)	0	1	3	2	0	0	0	0	6

Draw 7

Wednesday, January 24, 13:00

Sheet C	1	2	3	4	5	6	7	8	Final
South Korea (Kim)	2	0	2	0	0	1	1	X	6
Germany (Jäger) 🔨	0	3	0	0	1	0	0	X	4

=== Mixed doubles ===
Group D	W	L	W–L	DSC
Denmark	4	1	1–1	30.64
Germany	4	1	1–1	31.04
Switzerland	4	1	1–1	79.90
Austria	2	3	–	40.68
Kazakhstan	1	4	–	44.33
Italy	0	5	–	107.78

Round robin

Draw 1

Friday, January 26, 18:00

Sheet A	1	2	3	4	5	6	7	8	Final
Austria (Müller / Heinisch) 🔨	0	2	0	0	1	0	1	1	5
Germany (Sutor / Angrick)	2	0	3	3	0	1	0	0	9

Draw 3

Saturday, January 27, 14:00

Sheet D	1	2	3	4	5	6	7	8	Final
Germany (Sutor / Angrick) 🔨	0	0	0	4	2	1	2	0	9
Switzerland (Haehlen / Caccivio)	2	1	2	0	0	0	0	1	6

Draw 6

Sunday, January 28, 14:00

Sheet C	1	2	3	4	5	6	7	8	Final
Germany (Sutor / Angrick)	1	2	1	3	0	1	0	X	8
Kazakhstan (Tastemir / Tastemir) 🔨	0	0	0	0	1	0	3	X	4

Draw 8

Monday, January 29, 10:00

Sheet A	1	2	3	4	5	6	7	8	Final
Germany (Sutor / Angrick) 🔨	1	1	0	1	0	5	X	X	8
Italy (Maioni / Nichelatti)	0	0	1	0	1	0	X	X	2

Draw 13

Tuesday, January 30, 18:00

Sheet B	1	2	3	4	5	6	7	8	Final
Denmark (Schmidt / Schmidt) 🔨	2	0	1	3	2	0	1	X	9
Germany (Sutor / Angrick)	0	1	0	0	0	3	0	X	4

Quarterfinal

Wednesday, January 31, 19:00

Sheet B	1	2	3	4	5	6	7	8	Final
Great Britain (Soutar / Brewster) 🔨	2	0	2	0	0	2	0	1	7
Germany (Sutor / Angrick)	0	1	0	1	1	0	2	0	5

== Figure skating ==
Germany qualified one pair in ice dance via the 2023–24 ISU Junior Grand Prix.

Couples

Athletes	Event	SP/SD		FS/FD		Total	
Athletes	Event	Points	Rank	Points	Rank	Points	Rank
Mia Lee Mayer; Davide Calderari	Ice dance	50.57	8	74.87	8	125.44	8

== Freestyle skiing ==
Germany received 2 female quota in dual moguls, 2 male and 2 female quota in ski cross, and 2 male and 2 female quota in slopestyle/big air, but gave back one each.

Dual moguls

Athlete	Event	Group stage		Semifinals	Final / BM	
Athlete	Event	Points	Rank	Opposition Result	Opposition Result	Rank
Laura Eckle	Women's dual moguls	10	9	Did not advance		
Katharina Michl	Women's dual moguls	8	17	Did not advance		

Ski cross
Individual

Athlete	Event	Group heats		Semifinal	Final
Athlete	Event	Points	Rank	Position	Position
Niklas Höller	Men's ski cross	20	1 Q	1 Q	1st place, gold medalist(s)
Maximilian Öller	Men's ski cross	14	7	Did not advance	
Romy Bovelet	Women's ski cross	15	6	Did not advance	

Team

Athlete	Event	Pre-heats	Quarterfinal	Semifinal	Final
Athlete	Event	Position	Position	Position	Position
Niklas Höller; Romy Bovelet	Team ski cross	—N/a	1 Q	1 Q	4

Halfpipe, Slopestyle & Big Air

Athlete	Event	Qualification				Final				
Athlete	Event	Run 1	Run 2	Best	Rank	Run 1	Run 2	Run 3	Best	Rank
Hannes Baumhöfener	Men's big air	77.00	74.75	77.00	9 Q	65.25	55.00	22.50	120.25	7
Hannes Baumhöfener	Men's slopestyle	17.75	23.75	23.75	22	Did not advance				
Muriel Mohr	Women's big air	40.25	74.75	74.75	4 Q	81.00	85.00	64.50	166.00	3rd place, bronze medalist(s)
Muriel Mohr	Women's slopestyle	84.25	86.75	86.75	2 Q	78.75	61.00	70.50	78.75	3rd place, bronze medalist(s)

== Ice hockey ==
Germany qualified a team of eighteen ice hockey players for the women's six-team tournament.

Team

Christoph Hoehenleitner served as head coach and Jennifer Harß was assistant coach.

- Lina Alberts
- Tara Bach
- Emilija Birka
- Sarah Bouceka
- Hanna Bugl
- Victoria Gmeiner
- Mathilda Heine
- Milana Lutz
- Sandra Mayr
- Caylee Nagle
- Friederike Pfalz – A
- Charleen Poindl
- Madalena Seidel
- Anabel Seyrer
- Lena Spagert
- Hanna Weichenhain – A
- Zoe Wintgen
- Theresa Zielinski – C

Summary

Key:

- Q – Qualified
- GWS – Game winning shots

Team	Event	Group stage			Semifinal	Final	
Team	Event	Opponent Score	Opponent Score	Rank	Opponent Score	Opponent Score	Rank
Germany	Women's tournament	France; W 4–0	Switzerland; L 1–2	2 Q	Sweden; L 1–6	Switzerland; W 3–1	3rd place, bronze medalist(s)

=== Women's tournament ===
Preliminary round, Group B

Pos	Team	Pld	W	SOW	SOL	L	GF	GA	GD	Pts	Qualification
1	Switzerland	2	2	0	0	0	4	1	+3	6	Semifinals
2	Germany	2	1	0	0	1	5	2	+3	3	Semifinals
3	France	2	0	0	0	2	0	6	−6	0	

Source: IOC

28 January 2024; 17:00	Germany	4–0 (1–0, 3–0, 0–0)	France	Gangneung Hockey Centre; Attendance: 1,391

Game reference

Hanna Bugl
Goalies
Louna Ivaldy
Lysa Nogaretto
Referees:
(United States) Maria Gherardi
(Malaysia) Wan Mei Wah
Linesmen:
(Germany) Lara Fischer
(Switzerland) Domenica Maurer

Wintgen – 13:00	1–0
Weichenhain (Birka) – 18:54	2–0
Heine (Pfalz, Poindl) – 26:37	3–0
Mayr (Wintgen, Weichenhain) – 29:44	4–0

1.5 min
Penalties
7.5 min
32
Shots
15

29 January 2024; 17:00	Switzerland	2–1 (0–0, 1–0, 1–1)	Germany	Gangneung Hockey Centre; Attendance: 2,219

Game reference

Norina Schrupkowski
Goalies
Tara Bach
Referees:
(China) Ding Siwen
(Malaysia) Wan Mei Wah
Linesmen:
(Ukraine) Anhelina Maifeld
(Switzerland) Domenica Maurer

Tschannen (Birnstiel) – 23:49	1–0
Rohner (Wälti) – 36:06	2–0
	2–1	41:38 – Wintgen

4.5 min
Penalties
4.5 min
19
Shots
19

Semifinals

30 January 2024; 11:00	Sweden	6–1 (1–0, 3–0, 2–1)	Germany	Gangneung Hockey Centre; Attendance: 1,380

Game reference

Tilde Wyckman
Goalies
Hanna Bugl
Milana Lutz
Referees:
(United States) Maria Gherardi
(Malaysia) Wan Mei Wah
Linesmen:
(United States) Laura Schmidlein
(Finland) Ilona Silander

Vitalisson (Svanefjord, Westerlind) – 08:52	1–0
Grillfors (Ytfeldt, Österman) – 16:37	2–0
Svanefjord (Westerlind, Grillfors) – 18:05	3–0
Lindgren – 28:27	4–0
Grillfors – 33:15	5–0
Carlsson (Berndtsson, Lindgren) – 34:41	6–0
	6–1	43:26 – Pfalz (Seyrer) (PP)

1.5 min
Penalties
3 min
40
Shots
12

Bronze medal match

31 January 2024; 10:00	Switzerland	1–3 (0–2, 1–0, 0–1)	Germany	Gangneung Hockey Centre; Attendance: 1,911

Game reference

Valentina Camenzind
Norina Schrupkowski
Goalies
Tara Bach
Referees:
(Mexico) María Chávez
(Malaysia) Wan Mei Wah
Linesmen:
(Germany) Lara Fischer
(Switzerland) Domenica Maurer

	0–1	03:32 – Birka (Seyrer)
	0–2	04:20 – Zielinski (Seyrer, Birka) (PP)
Tschannen (Mériguet) – 21:56	1–2
	1–3	44:32 – Weichenhain (ENG)

6 min
Penalties
3 min
24
Shots
26

== Luge ==
Germany achieved the maximum quota via the 2023–24 Youth A World Cup Standings.

Men

Athlete	Event	Run 1		Run 2		Total	
Athlete	Event	Time	Rank	Time	Rank	Time	Rank
Hannes Röder	Singles	49.402	21	46.956	6	1:36.358	16
Silas Sartor	Singles	47.486	10	47.378	10	1:34.864	9
Louis Grünbeck; Maximilian Kührt	Doubles	47.428	3	47.648	3	1:35.076	3rd place, bronze medalist(s)
Liron Raimer; Silas Sartor	Doubles	47.945	5	49.110	6	1:37.055	5

Women

Athlete	Event	Run 1		Run 2		Total	
Athlete	Event	Time	Rank	Time	Rank	Time	Rank
Melina Hänsch	Singles	48.356	4	48.691	7	1:37.047	4
Antonia Pietschmann	Singles	47.985	1	47.789	1	1:35.774	1st place, gold medalist(s)
Lilly Bierast; Leandra Claus	Doubles	49.933	7	50.769	7	1:40.702	7
Sarah Pflaume; Lina Peterseim	Doubles	48.802	4	49.616	6	1:38.418	4

Mixed team relay

Athlete	Event	Women's singles		Men's singles		Doubles		Total	
Athlete	Event	Time	Rank	Time	Rank	Time	Rank	Time	Rank
Louis Grünbeck; Maximilian Kuhrt; Antonia Pietschmann; Silas Sartor	Team relay	48.576	1	51.122	7	DNF			

== Nordic combined ==
Germany received 2 male and 2 female quota.

Individual

Athlete	Event	Ski jumping				Cross-country	
Athlete	Event	Distance	Points	Rank	Deficit	Time	Rank
Jonathan Gräbert	Men's normal hill/6 km	102.0	126.8	7	+0:57	14:08.2	3rd place, bronze medalist(s)
Johann Unger	Men's normal hill/6 km	106.0	131.9	5	+0:36	14:23.2	5
Sofia Eggensberger	Women's normal hill/4 km	89.0	90.0	14	+2:53	13:46.9	14
Mara-Jolie Schlossarek	Women's normal hill/4 km	84.0	77.5	17	+3:43	14:44.2	18

Team

Athlete	Event	Ski jumping				Cross-country	
Athlete	Event	Distance	Points	Rank	Deficit	Time	Rank
Mara-Jolie Schlossarek; Johann Unger; Jonathan Gräbert; Sofia Eggensberger	Mixed team	372.5	403.2	5	+0:45	36:00.4	8

== Short track speed skating ==
Germany achieved 1 male and 2 female quota at the 2023 World Junior Short Track Speed Skating Championships. Germany later gave back 1 female quota.

Men

Athlete	Event	Heats		Quarterfinal		Semifinal		Final	
Athlete	Event	Time	Rank	Time	Rank	Time	Rank	Time	Rank
Moritz Hartmann	500 m	43.758	4	Did not advance					
Moritz Hartmann	1000 m	1:31.017	3	Did not advance					
Moritz Hartmann	1500 m	—N/a		PEN		Did not advance			

Women

Athlete	Event	Heats		Quarterfinal		Semifinal		Final	
Athlete	Event	Time	Rank	Time	Rank	Time	Rank	Time	Rank
Paula Torzewski-Kuhnt	500 m	45.590	2 Q	46.028	4	Did not advance			
Paula Torzewski-Kuhnt	1000 m	1:36.323	2 Q	1:33.491	3 q	1:32.641	3 QB	1:33.378	9
Paula Torzewski-Kuhnt	1500 m	—N/a		2:38.374	1 Q	2:27.391	3 QB	2:44.645	9

== Skeleton ==
Germany received 2 male and 2 female quota via the IBSF Youth Olympics Ranking List.

Athlete	Event	Run 1		Run 2		Total	
Athlete	Event	Time	Rank	Time	Rank	Time	Rank
Vinzenz Rosenberg	Men's	54.16	8	53.59	6	1:47.75	7
Emil Schäfer	Men's	53.05	4	54.02	7	1:47.07	5
Marie Angerer	Women's	55.34	5	56.45	13	1:51.79	9
Maria Votz	Women's	54.72	2	54.73	3	1:49.45	1st place, gold medalist(s)

== Ski jumping ==
Germany received 2 male and 2 female quota.

Individual

Athlete	Event	First round			Final			Total	
Athlete	Event	Distance	Points	Rank	Distance	Points	Rank	Points	Rank
Alex Reiter	Men's normal hill	96.5	94.1	11	99.0	98.4	9	192.5	10
Max Unglaube	Men's normal hill	98.5	97.1	10	101.0	100.8	7	197.9	9
Kim Amy Duschek	Women's normal hill	88.5	72.8	13	80.5	55.8	19	128.6	15
Anna-Fay Scharfenberg	Women's normal hill	90.5	80.5	10	97.5	92.4	8	172.9	9

Team

Athlete	Event	First round			Final			Total	
Athlete	Event	Distance	Points	Rank	Distance	Points	Rank	Points	Rank
Anna-Fay Scharfenberg; Max Unglaube; Kim Amy Duschek; Alex Reiter	Mixed team	377.5	368.9	4	367.0	364.7	4	733.6	4

== Snowboarding ==
Germany received 2 male and 1 female quota in snowboard cross, 1 male and 2 female quota in halfpipe, but they gave back the male quota.

Snowboard cross
Individual

Athlete	Event	Group stage		Semifinal	Final
Athlete	Event	Points	Rank	Position	Position
Kenta Kirchwehm	Men's snowboard cross	16	4 Q	3 SF	8
Felix Schwenkel	Men's snowboard cross	15	5	Did not advance	
Rosalie Bauer	Women's snowboard cross	15	6	Did not advance	

Mixed

Athlete	Event	Pre-heats	Quarterfinal	Semifinal	Final
Athlete	Event	Position	Position	Position	Position
Kenta Kirchwehm; Rosalie Bauer	Team snowboard cross	2 Q	4	Did not advance	

Halfpipe, Slopestyle & Big Air

Athlete	Event	Qualification				Final				
Athlete	Event	Run 1	Run 2	Best	Rank	Run 1	Run 2	Run 3	Best	Rank
Kona Ettel	Women's halfpipe	66.75	68.00	68.00	6 Q	69.75	64.25	68.50	69.75	5
Anne Hedrich	Women's halfpipe	70.75	77.75	77.75	3 Q	68.25	13.00	24.25	68.25	6

== Speed skating ==
Germany received 2 male and 2 female quota via the 2023–24 ISU Junior World Cup standings.

Men

Athlete	Event	Time	Rank
Leo Huber	500 m	39.77	22
Leo Huber	1500 m	2:02.30	20
Finn Sonnekalb	500 m	36.61	1st place, gold medalist(s)
Finn Sonnekalb	1500 m	1:50.53	1st place, gold medalist(s)

Women

Athlete	Event	Time	Rank
Paula Albrecht	500 m	42.07	16
Paula Albrecht	1500 m	2:12.13	15
Mia Meinig	500 m	43.52	27
Mia Meinig	1500 m	2:15.89	21

Mass Start

Athlete	Event	Semifinal			Final		
Athlete	Event	Points	Time	Rank	Points	Time	Rank
Leo Huber	Men's mass start	2	6:21.82	7 Q	3	5:47.51	7
Finn Sonnekalb	Men's mass start	30	5:29.67	1 Q	30	5:30.07	1st place, gold medalist(s)
Paula Albrecht	Women's mass start	0	6:28.86	14	Did not advance		
Mia Meinig	Women's mass start	0	6:02.23	12	Did not advance		

Mixed relay

Athlete	Event	Semifinal		Final	
Athlete	Event	Time	Rank	Time	Rank
Paula Albrecht; Finn Sonnekalb	Mixed relay	DQ		Did not advance	

== See also ==
- Germany at the 2024 Summer Olympics
