= Freestyle skiing at the 2024 Winter Youth Olympics – Men's halfpipe =

Men's slopestyle at the IV Winter Youth Olympic Games
- Venue: Welli Hilli Park
- Dates: 31 January
- Competitors: 14 from 7 nations
- Winning points: 94.25

Medalists
1st place, gold medalist(s)		Luke Harrold	New Zealand
2nd place, silver medalist(s)		Finley Melville Ives	New Zealand
3rd place, bronze medalist(s)		Alan Bornet	Switzerland

The men's halfpipe event in freestyle skiing at the 2024 Winter Youth Olympics took place on 31 January at the Welli Hilli Park.

== Qualification ==
The qualification was started at 10:15.

Rank	Bib	Name	Country	Run 1	Run 2	Best	Notes
1	2	Finley Melville Ives	New Zealand	81.75	92.00	92.00	Q
2	1	Luke Harrold	New Zealand	88.00	89.25	89.25	Q
3	6	Su Shuaibing	China	75.25	46.75	75.25	Q
4	4	Hunter Maytin	United States	70.25	22.00	70.25	Q
5	10	Alan Bornet	Switzerland	61.00	67.00	67.00	Q
6	3	Ben Fethke	United States	63.25	34.50	63.25	Q
7	8	Liam Richards	New Zealand	50.50	62.00	62.00	Q
8	13	Li Hongzu	China	38.50	60.75	60.75	Q
9	7	Kashu Sato	Japan	59.75	56.25	59.75	Q
10	5	Moon Hee-sung	South Korea	55.50	18.00	55.50	Q
11	12	Quincy Barr	Canada	47.50	52,75	52,75	
12	11	Alois Panchaud	Switzerland	45.00	50.25	50.25	
13	14	Trent Morozumi	Canada	31.75	22.25	31.75	
14	9	Shin Dong-ho	South Korea	DNS	21.75	21.75	

== Final ==
The final was started at 13:30.

Rank	Bib	Name	Country	Run 1	Run 2	Run 3	Best
1st place, gold medalist(s)	1	Luke Harrold	New Zealand	94.25	25.75	85.50	94.25
2nd place, silver medalist(s)	2	Finley Melville Ives	New Zealand	92.50	55.25	42.00	92.50
3rd place, bronze medalist(s)	10	Alan Bornet	Switzerland	76.75	85.00	61.25	85.00
4	6	Su Shuaibing	China	82.00	57.75	34.00	82.00
5	4	Hunter Maytin	United States	25.75	75.25	25.75	75.25
6	3	Ben Fethke	United States	37.00	30.50	72.50	72.50
7	8	Liam Richards	New Zealand	70.25	16.50	20.75	70.25
8	13	Li Hongzu	China	61.25	58.00	65.25	65.25
9	7	Kashu Sato	Japan	55.00	47.75	53.50	55.00
10	5	Moon Hee-sung	South Korea	43.25	12.25	DNS	43.25
