= Freestyle skiing at the 2024 Winter Youth Olympics – Men's big air =

Men's big air at the IV Winter Youth Olympic Games
- Venue: Welli Hilli Park
- Dates: 27–28 January
- Competitors: 24 from 15 nations
- Winning points: 177.75

Medalists
1st place, gold medalist(s)		Charlie Beatty	Canada
2nd place, silver medalist(s)		Olly Nicholls	Japan
3rd place, bronze medalist(s)		Luke Harrold	New Zealand

The men's big air event in freestyle skiing at the 2024 Winter Youth Olympics took place on 27 and 28 January at the Welli Hilli Park.

== Qualification ==
The qualification was started at 13:15.

Rank	Bib	Name	Country	Run 1	Run 2	Best	Notes
1	15	Petr Muller	Czech Republic	92.50	71.00	92.50	Q
2	14	Joey Elliss	Australia	74.00	91.75	91.75	Q
3	20	Olly Nicholls	Japan	91.00	42.00	91.00	Q
4	6	Luke Harrold	New Zealand	89.75	32.75	89.75	Q
5	1	Charlie Beatty	Canada	86.00	86.75	86.75	Q
6	3	Theodor Skarpnord	Norway	27.50	85.00	85.00	Q
7	11	Jaakko Koskinen	Finland	81.00	76.00	81.00	Q
8	10	Aimo Mandelin	Finland	54.25	79.00	79.00	Q
9	4	Hannes Baumhöfener	Germany	77.00	74.75	77.00	Q
10	23	Alois Panchaud	Switzerland	76.25	30.75	76.25	Q
11	16	Henry Townshend	United States	16.00	75.75	75.75	
12	17	Lars Ruchti	Switzerland	75.50	73.00	75.50	
13	9	Filip Stene-Johansen	Norway	70.50	56.00	70.50	
14	22	Pijus Baniulis	Lithuania	67.75	69.00	69.00	
15	12	Timothé Roch	France	64.00	17.25	64.00	
16	7	Viktor Alexander Maksyagin	Switzerland	31.75	62.00	62.00	
17	18	Hamish Barlow	New Zealand	59.25	56.25	59.25	
18	19	Santiago Magni	Argentina	39.50	53.50	53.50	
19	21	Lee Seo-jun	South Korea	49.75	16.75	49.75	
20	8	Leon Lorenzini	Chile	44.25	46.50	46.50	
21	5	Jack Rodeheaver	United States	30.00	13.00	30.00	
22	24	Brendon Choi	South Korea	10.00	11.75	11.75	
	13	Finley Melville-Ives	New Zealand	Did not start			
	2	Matthew Lepine	Canada	Did not start			

== Final ==
The final was started at 10:15.

Rank	Start order	Bib	Name	Country	Run 1	Run 2	Run 3	Total
1st place, gold medalist(s)	6	1	Charlie Beatty	Canada	86.50	89.25	88.50	177.75
2nd place, silver medalist(s)	8	20	Olly Nicholls	Japan	86.00	88.50	28.25	174.50
3rd place, bronze medalist(s)	7	6	Luke Harrold	New Zealand	84.25	88.00	25.25	172.25
4	3	10	Aimo Mandelin	Finland	76.25	90.25	44.25	166.50
5	9	14	Joey Elliss	Australia	87.00	45.00	47.00	134.00
6	5	3	Theodor Skarpnord	Norway	41.50	63.00	64.50	127.50
7	2	4	Hannes Baumhöfener	Germany	65.25	55.00	22.50	120.25
8	4	11	Jaakko Koskinen	Finland	18.50	61.75	45.25	107.00
9	1	23	Alois Panchaud	Switzerland	66.00	15.00	31.50	97.50
10	10	15	Petr Muller	Czech Republic	19.75	42.50	65.25	85.00
