= Lithuania at the 2024 Winter Youth Olympics =

- Flag of Lithuania
- IOC code: LTU
- NOC: Lithuanian National Olympic Committee

in Gangwon, South Korea 19 January 2024 – 1 February 2024
- Competitors: 13 in 5 sports
- Flag bearer (opening): Daniel Buchovskij & Ugnė Paulavičiūtė
- Flag bearer (closing): TBD
- Medals: Gold 0 Silver 0 Bronze 0 Total 0

Winter Youth Olympics appearances (overview)
- 2012; 2016; 2020; 2024

Lithuania is scheduled to compete at the 2024 Winter Youth Olympics in Gangwon, South Korea, from January 19 to February 1, 2024, This will be Lithuania's fourth appearance at the Winter Youth Olympic Games, having competed at every Games since the inaugural edition in 2012.

Biathlete Daniel Buchowski and freestyle skier Ugnė Paulavičiūtė were the country's flagbearers during the opening ceremony.

== Competitors ==
The following is the list of number of competitors (per gender) participating at the games per sport/discipline.

| Sport | Men | Women | Total |
|---|---|---|---|
| Alpine skiing | 1 | 0 | 1 |
| Biathlon | 3 | 3 | 6 |
| Cross-country skiing | 2 | 1 | 3 |
| Freestyle skiing | 1 | 1 | 2 |
| Short track speed skating | 0 | 1 | 1 |
| Total | 7 | 6 | 13 |

== Alpine skiing ==
Lithuania qualified one male alpine skier.

Men

| Athlete | Event | Run 1 | | Run 2 | | Total | |
| Athlete | Event | Time | Rank | Time | Rank | Time | Rank |
|---|---|---|---|---|---|---|---|
| Luca Poberai | Super-G | — | | | | 59.12 | 43 |
| Luca Poberai | Combined | 58.73 | 43 | 1:01.39 | 29 | 2:00.12 | 31 |
| Luca Poberai | Giant slalom | 53.00 | 42 | 48.13 | 26 | 1:41.13 | 28 |
| Luca Poberai | Slalom | 53.34 | 47 | 58.35 | 30 | 1:51.69 | 30 |

== Biathlon ==
Men

| Athlete | Event | Time | Misses | Rank |
|---|---|---|---|---|
| Juozas Augustinavičius | Sprint | 24:09.3 | 1 | 37 |
| Juozas Augustinavičius | Individual | 43:55.9 | 5 | 33 |
| Daniel Buchovskij | Sprint | 26:07.3 | 4 | 73 |
| Daniel Buchovskij | Individual | 44:53.7 | 9 | 69 |
| Ignas Rakštelis | Sprint | 25:38.9 | 2 | 68 |
| Ignas Rakštelis | Individual | 48:20.1 | 7 | 81 |

Women

| Athlete | Event | Time | Misses | Rank |
|---|---|---|---|---|
| Austėja Pupelytė | Individual | 50:36.6 | 6 | 88 |
| Rusnė Motiejūnaitė | Sprint | 29:18.9 | 6 | 83 |
| Rusnė Motiejūnaitė | Individual | 44:32.5 | 9 | 84 |
| Emilija Mincevič | Sprint | 25:15.6 | 3 | 60 |
| Emilija Mincevič | Individual | 42:56.9 | 4 | 61 |

Mixed

| Athletes | Event | Time | Misses | Rank |
|---|---|---|---|---|
| Juozas Augustinavičius; Emilija Mincevič | Single mixed relay | 52:06.8 | 6+13 | 21 |
| Emilija Mincevič; Rusnė Motiejūnaitė; Juozas Augustinavičius; Daniel Buchovskij | Mixed relay | LAP | LAP | 18 |

== Cross-country skiing ==
Lithuania qualified three cross-country skiers (two men and one woman).

Men

| Athlete | Event | Qualification | | Quarterfinal | | Semifinal | | Final | |
| Athlete | Event | Time | Rank | Time | Rank | Time | Rank | Time | Rank |
|---|---|---|---|---|---|---|---|---|---|
| Daujotas Jonikas | 7.5 km classical | — | | | | | | 24:21.7 | 59 |
| Daujotas Jonikas | Sprint freestyle | 3:19.61 | 39 | Did not advance | | | | | |
| Matas Gražys | 7.5 km classical | — | | | | | | 23:11.4 | 50 |
| Matas Gražys | Sprint freestyle | 3:25.19 | 50 | Did not advance | | | | | |

Women

| Athlete | Event | Qualification | | Quarterfinal | | Semifinal | | Final | |
| Athlete | Event | Time | Rank | Time | Rank | Time | Rank | Time | Rank |
|---|---|---|---|---|---|---|---|---|---|
| Kornelija Sukovaitė | Sprint freestyle | Did not start | | | | | | | |

== Freestyle skiing ==
Lithuania qualified two freestyle skiers (one man and one woman).

| Athlete | Event | Qualification | | Final | |
| Athlete | Event | Score | Rank | Score | Rank |
|---|---|---|---|---|---|
| Pijus Baniulis | Men's slopestyle | 65.00 | 11 | Did not advance | |
| Pijus Baniulis | Men's big air | 69.00 | 14 | Did not advance | |
| Ugnė Paulavičiūtė | Women's slopestyle | 34.25 | 15 | Did not advance | |

== Short track speed skating ==
Lithuania qualified one female skater.

Women

| Athlete | Event | Heats | | Quarterfinal | | Semifinal | | Final | |
| Athlete | Event | Time | Rank | Time | Rank | Time | Rank | Time | Rank |
|---|---|---|---|---|---|---|---|---|---|
| Valentina Levickytė | 500 m | 49.057 | 4 | Did not advance | | | | | |
| Valentina Levickytė | 1000 m | 1:42.426 | 4 | Did not advance | | | | | |
| Valentina Levickytė | 1500 m | — | | 2:48.487 | 6 | Did not advance | | | |

== See also ==
- Lithuania at the 2024 Summer Olympics
