= Switzerland at the 2024 Winter Youth Olympics =

- Flag of Switzerland
- IOC code: SUI
- NOC: Swiss Olympic Association

in Gangwon, South Korea 19 January 2024 – 1 February 2024
- Competitors: 71 in 11 sports
- Flag bearers (opening): Jonas Aschilier & Jana Soltermann
- Flag bearer (closing): TBD
- Medals Ranked 18th: Gold 1 Silver 1 Bronze 7 Total 9

Winter Youth Olympics appearances
- 2012; 2016; 2020; 2024

Switzerland is scheduled to compete at the 2024 Winter Youth Olympics in Gangwon, South Korea, from January 19 to February 1, 2024. This will be Switzerland's fourth appearance at the Winter Youth Olympic Games, having competed at every Games since the inaugural edition in 2012.

The Swiss team consisted of 71 athletes (32 men and 39 women) competing in 11 sports. Snowboarder Jonas Aschilier and curler Jana Soltermann were the country's flagbearers during the opening ceremony.

== Competitors ==
The following is the list of number of competitors (per gender) participating at the games per sport/discipline.

Sport	Men	Women	Total
Alpine skiing	3	3	6
Biathlon	4	4	8
Cross-country skiing	2	2	4
Curling	3	3	6
Figure skating	2	1	3
Freestyle skiing	8	3	11
Ice hockey	0	18	18
Nordic combined	2	1	3
Ski jumping	2	1	3
Snowboarding	5	3	8
Speed skating	1	0	1
Total	32	39	71

== Medalists ==
Medal	Name	Sport	Event	Date
Gold	Noelie Widmer	Snowboarding	Women's snowboard cross	20 January
Silver	Shaienne Zehnder	Alpine skiing	Women's giant slalom	23 January
Bronze	Shaienne Zehnder	Alpine skiing	Women's super-G	21 January
Bronze	Leena Thommen	Freestyle skiing	Women's ski cross	21 January
Bronze	Lorenzo Rosset; Valentine Lagger	Freestyle skiing	Mixed team ski cross	24 January
Bronze	Nathan Dryburgh; Alissa Rudolf; Livio Ernst; Jana Soltermann	Curling	Mixed team	25 January
Bronze	Alain Bornet	Freestyle skiing	Men's halfpipe	31 January
Bronze	Leandra Schöpfer; Nolan Gertsch; Ilaria Gruber; Maximilian Wanger	Cross-country skiing	4 × 5 kilometres mixed relay	1 February
Bronze	Lura Wick	Snowboarding	Women's halfpipe	1 February

== Alpine skiing ==
Switzerland qualified six alpine skiers (three per gender).

Men

Athlete	Event	Run 1		Run 2		Total	
Athlete	Event	Time	Rank	Time	Rank	Time	Rank
Robert Clarke	Super-G	—N/a				55.12	8
Robert Clarke	Giant slalom	50.95	19	46.50	13	1:37.45	13
Robert Clarke	Slalom	49.18	24	Disqualified			
Robert Clarke	Combined	54.71	6	57.35	23	1:52.06	16
Yanis Häusermann	Super-G	—N/a				55.86	20
Yanis Häusermann	Giant slalom	51.71	26	Did not finish			
Yanis Häusermann	Slalom	48.74	21	54.25	16	1:42.99	14
Yanis Häusermann	Combined	55.51	14	57.23	22	1:52.74	20
Romain Monney	Super-G	—N/a				55.71	19
Romain Monney	Giant slalom	50.57	13	46.99	18	1:47.56	14
Romain Monney	Slalom	50.15	31	54.22	15	1:44.37	17
Romain Monney	Combined	57.26	34	58.11	24	1:55.37	24

Women

Athlete	Event	Run 1		Run 2		Total	
Athlete	Event	Time	Rank	Time	Rank	Time	Rank
Justine Herzog	Super-G	—N/a				53.96	4
Justine Herzog	Giant slalom	49.14	6	53.29	6	1:42.43	4
Justine Herzog	Slalom	51.77	14	48.29	3	1:40.06	7
Justine Herzog	Combined	56.38	3	54.52	19	1:50.90	14
Fabienne Wenger	Super-G	—N/a				54.01	5
Fabienne Wenger	Giant slalom	49.27	7	54.39	15	1:43.66	9
Fabienne Wenger	Slalom	50.89	9	49.05	6	1:39.94	5
Fabienne Wenger	Combined	55.80	1	53.89	18	1:49.69	5
Shaienne Zehnder	Super-G	—N/a				53.75	3rd place, bronze medalist(s)
Shaienne Zehnder	Giant slalom	48.56	2	52.65	1	1:41.21	2nd place, silver medalist(s)
Shaienne Zehnder	Slalom	51.77	14	48.29	3	1:40.06	7
Shaienne Zehnder	Combined	56.79	6	53.14	13	1:49.93	6

Mixed

Athletes	Event	Round of 16	Quarterfinals	Semifinals	Final / BM	
Athletes	Event	Opponent Result	Opponent Result	Opponent Result	Opponent Result	Rank
Shaienne Zehnder; Romain Monney	Parallel mixed team	South Korea; W 3–1	Finland; L 2–2*	Did not advance		

== Biathlon ==
Switzerland qualified eight biathletes (four per gender).

Men

Athlete	Event	Time	Misses	Rank
Pablo Baselgia	Sprint	24:13.6	2 (1+1)	39
Pablo Baselgia	Individual	49:12.8	7 (1+2+4+0)	54
Yanis Dumaz	Sprint	25:03.8	4 (2+2)	58
Yanis Dumaz	Individual	53:12.0	12 (3+3+3+3)	79
Levin Kunz	Sprint	23:31.2	3 (1+2)	22
Levin Kunz	Individual	46:47.0	6 (2+3+1+0)	28
Björn Niederhauser	Sprint	24:00.1	1 (0+1)	34
Björn Niederhauser	Individual	48:45.4	6 (1+2+0+3)	50

Women

Athlete	Event	Time	Misses	Rank
Lena Baumann	Sprint	21:16.0	3 (2+1)	8
Lena Baumann	Individual	44:16.4	7 (1+5+1+0)	46
Molly Kafka	Sprint	21:09.7	1 (1+0)	7
Molly Kafka	Individual	42:42.5	6 (1+2+1+2)	26
Eliane Kiser	Sprint	24:31.2	6 (3+3)	52
Eliane Kiser	Individual	43:49.6	4 (1+1+1+1)	43
Maëline Triponez	Sprint	25:13.6	4 (3+1)	59
Maëline Triponez	Individual	43:42.9	3 (0+1+1+1)	38

Mixed

Athletes	Event	Time	Misses	Rank
Molly Kafka; Levin Kunz	Single mixed relay	45:31.7	0+8	4
Molly Kafka; Lena Baumann; Björn Niederhauser; Levin Kunz	Mixed relay	Disqualified		

== Cross-country skiing ==
Switzerland qualified four cross-country skiers (two per gender).

Men

Athlete	Event	Qualification		Quarterfinal		Semifinal		Final	
Athlete	Event	Time	Rank	Time	Rank	Time	Rank	Time	Rank
Nolan Gertsch	7.5 km classical	—N/a						20:15.8	7
Nolan Gertsch	Sprint freestyle	3:09.85	20 Q	3:04.88	3 LL	3:10.60	1 Q	3:19.14	5
Maximilian Wanger	7.5 km classical	—N/a						20:35.0	13
Maximilian Wanger	Sprint freestyle	3:08.57	11 Q	3:04.69	2 Q	3:10.72	4	Did not advance	

Women

Athlete	Event	Qualification		Quarterfinal		Semifinal		Final	
Athlete	Event	Time	Rank	Time	Rank	Time	Rank	Time	Rank
Ilaria Gruber	7.5 km classical	—N/a						24:28.2	29
Ilaria Gruber	Sprint freestyle	3:28.55	2 Q	3:36.63	1 Q	4:08.09	6	Did not advance	
Leandra Schöpfer	7.5 km classical	—N/a						22:59.4	9
Leandra Schöpfer	Sprint freestyle	3:44.77	24 Q	3:41.13	4	Did not advance			

Mixed

Athlete	Event	Time	Rank
Leandra Schöpfer; Nolan Gertsch; Ilaria Gruber; Maximilian Wanger	Mixed relay	53:13.3	3rd place, bronze medalist(s)

== Curling ==
Switzerland qualified a mixed team and mixed doubles pair for a total of six athletes.

Summary

Team	Event	Group Stage								Quarterfinal	Semifinal	Final / BM	
Team	Event	Opposition Score	Opposition Score	Opposition Score	Opposition Score	Opposition Score	Opposition Score	Opposition Score	Rank	Opposition Score	Opposition Score	Opposition Score	Rank
Nathan Dryburgh; Alissa Rudolf; Livio Ernst; Jana Soltermann	Mixed team	Germany; W 11–2	Denmark; L 4–6	South Korea; W 8–4	Canada; L 5–6	Brazil; W 13–2	Great Britain; L 3–8	Italy; W 8–7	3 Q	United States; W 4–3	Great Britain; L 6–8	China; W 10–8	3rd place, bronze medalist(s)
Jana-Tamara Haehlen; Nevio Caccivio	Mixed doubles	Italy; W 7–2	Germany; L 6–9	Denmark; W 6–3	Kazakhstan; W 9–1	Austria; W 9–3	—N/a		3	Did not advance			12

=== Mixed team ===
Group B	Skip	W	L	W–L	PF	PA	EW	EL	BE	SE	DSC
Great Britain	Logan Carson	6	1	–	44	30	26	21	4	7	51.75
Denmark	Jacob Schmidt	5	2	–	48	28	27	20	2	9	34.70
Switzerland	Nathan Dryburgh	4	3	2–0	52	35	25	23	5	7	39.96
Italy	Andrea Gilli	4	3	1–1	46	38	29	23	3	7	50.58
South Korea	Kim Dae-hyun	4	3	0–2	48	33	24	22	3	8	109.88
Canada	Nathan Gray	3	4	–	40	34	24	20	3	11	35.43
Brazil	Pedro Ribeiro	1	6	1–0	17	81	13	31	0	2	103.39
Germany	Lukas Jäger	1	6	0–1	30	46	19	27	2	5	68.51

Round robin

Draw 1

Saturday, January 20, 14:00

Sheet B	1	2	3	4	5	6	7	8	Final
Germany (Jäger)	0	0	0	1	0	1	0	X	2
Switzerland (Dryburgh) 🔨	0	3	2	0	4	0	2	X	11

Draw 2

Sunday, January 21, 10:00

Sheet A	1	2	3	4	5	6	7	8	Final
Switzerland (Dryburgh)	0	1	0	1	0	2	0	X	4
Denmark (Schmidt) 🔨	2	0	1	0	2	0	1	X	6

Draw 3

Sunday, January 21, 18:00

Sheet C	1	2	3	4	5	6	7	8	Final
Switzerland (Dryburgh) 🔨	0	1	2	0	1	0	2	2	8
South Korea (Kim)	0	0	0	2	0	2	0	0	4

Draw 4

Monday, January 22, 14:00

Sheet A	1	2	3	4	5	6	7	8	Final
Canada (Gray) 🔨	0	2	0	1	0	2	0	1	6
Switzerland (Dryburgh)	2	0	1	0	2	0	0	0	5

Draw 5

Tuesday, January 23, 10:00

Sheet D	1	2	3	4	5	6	7	8	Final
Switzerland (Dryburgh) 🔨	4	0	0	4	4	1	X	X	13
Brazil (Ribeiro)	0	1	1	0	0	0	X	X	2

Draw 6

Tuesday, January 23, 18:00

Sheet B	1	2	3	4	5	6	7	8	Final
Switzerland (Dryburgh) 🔨	0	0	0	2	1	0	0	0	3
Great Britain (Carson)	0	1	1	0	0	2	0	4	8

Draw 7

Wednesday, January 24, 13:00

Sheet D	1	2	3	4	5	6	7	8	9	Final
Italy (Gilli)	0	1	1	0	2	1	0	2	0	7
Switzerland (Dryburgh) 🔨	2	0	0	4	0	0	1	0	1	8

Qualification Game

Wednesday, January 24, 19:00

Sheet A	1	2	3	4	5	6	7	8	Final
United States (Ponzio) 🔨	0	2	0	0	0	1	0	0	3
Switzerland (Dryburgh)	0	0	1	1	0	0	2	0	4

Semifinal

Thursday, January 25, 9:00

Sheet C	1	2	3	4	5	6	7	8	Final
Great Britain (Carson) 🔨	3	0	2	0	1	0	2	0	8
Switzerland (Dryburgh)	0	1	0	1	0	3	0	1	6

Bronze medal game

Thursday, January 25, 14:30

Sheet B	1	2	3	4	5	6	7	8	9	Final
China (Li) 🔨	1	0	0	3	0	1	0	3	0	8
Switzerland (Dryburgh)	0	2	0	0	4	0	2	0	2	10

=== Mixed doubles ===
Group D	W	L	W–L	DSC
Denmark	4	1	1–1	30.64
Germany	4	1	1–1	31.04
Switzerland	4	1	1–1	79.90
Austria	2	3	–	40.68
Kazakhstan	1	4	–	44.33
Italy	0	5	–	107.78

Round robin

Draw 1

Friday, January 26, 18:00

Sheet C	1	2	3	4	5	6	7	8	Final
Italy (Maioni / Nichelatti) 🔨	0	1	0	0	1	0	0	X	2
Switzerland (Haehlen / Caccivio)	1	0	3	1	0	1	1	X	7

Draw 3

Saturday, January 27, 14:00

Sheet D	1	2	3	4	5	6	7	8	Final
Germany (Sutor / Angrick) 🔨	0	0	0	4	2	1	2	0	9
Switzerland (Haehlen / Caccivio)	2	1	2	0	0	0	0	1	6

Draw 6

Sunday, January 28, 14:00

Sheet A	1	2	3	4	5	6	7	8	Final
Denmark (Schmidt / Schmidt) 🔨	0	0	0	2	0	1	0	0	3
Switzerland (Haehlen / Caccivio)	1	1	1	0	1	0	1	1	6

Draw 8

Monday, January 29, 10:00

Sheet B	1	2	3	4	5	6	7	8	Final
Switzerland (Haehlen / Caccivio)	3	1	0	1	1	3	X	X	9
Kazakhstan (Tastemir / Tastemir) 🔨	0	0	1	0	0	0	X	X	1

Draw 11

Tuesday, January 30, 10:00

Sheet D	1	2	3	4	5	6	7	8	Final
Switzerland (Haehlen / Caccivio) 🔨	3	2	0	1	1	0	2	X	9
Austria (Müller / Heinisch)	0	0	1	0	0	2	0	X	3

== Figure skating ==
Athlete	Event	SP/SD		FS/FD		Total	
Athlete	Event	Points	Rank	Points	Rank	Points	Rank
Aurélian Chervet	Men's singles	57.16	11	118.57	8	175.73	10
Georgii Pavlov	Men's singles	61.97	7	116.85	9	178.82	9
Anthea Gradinaru	Women's singles	55.78	10	107.19	9	162.97	9

== Freestyle skiing ==
Dual moguls

Athlete	Event	Group Stage						Semifinals	Final / BM	
Athlete	Event	Opposition Result	Opposition Result	Opposition Result	Opposition Result	Points	Rank	Opposition Result	Opposition Result	Rank
Tazio Buzzi	Men's dual moguls	Perets (UKR); W 3–2	Rastruba (KAZ); DNF 1–3	Lee (KOR); L 2–3	Sauvageau (CAN); L 2–3	8	4	Did not advance		
Joel Gianella	Men's dual moguls	Long (CHN); DNF 1–3	Lampi (FIN); L 2–3	Huff (USA); DNF 1–3	Gravenfors (SWE); DNF 1–3	5	5	Did not advance		

Ski cross
Individual

Athlete	Event	Group heats		Semifinal	Final
Athlete	Event	Points	Rank	Position	Position
Lucas Looze	Men's ski cross	15	6	Did not advance	
Lorenzo Rosset	Men's ski cross	12	9	Did not advance	
Valentine Lagger	Women's ski cross	18	3 Q	2 BF	4
Leena Thommen	Women's ski cross	19	2 Q	2 BF	3rd place, bronze medalist(s)

Team

Athlete	Event	Pre-heats	Quarterfinal	Semifinal	Final
Athlete	Event	Position	Position	Position	Position
Lucas Looze; Leena Thommen	Team ski cross	1 Q	2 Q	3 SF	5
Lorenzo Rosset; Valentine Lagger	Team ski cross	2 Q	1 Q	2 BF	3rd place, bronze medalist(s)

Halfpipe, Slopestyle & Big Air

Athlete	Event	Qualification				Final				
Athlete	Event	Run 1	Run 2	Best	Rank	Run 1	Run 2	Run 3	Best	Rank
Alan Bornet	Men's halfpipe	61.00	67.00	67.00	5 Q	76.75	85.00	61.25	85.00	3rd place, bronze medalist(s)
Viktor Alexander Maksyagin	Men's big air	31.75	62.00	62.00	16	Did not advance				
Viktor Alexander Maksyagin	Men's slopestyle	47.50	89.25	89.25	2 Q	76.25	50.00	28.25	76.25	4
Alois Panchaud	Men's big air	76.25	30.75	76.25	10 Q	66.00	15.00	31.50	97.50	9
Alois Panchaud	Men's halfpipe	45.00	50.25	50.25	12	Did not advance				
Alois Panchaud	Men's slopestyle	74.50	71.75	74.50	8 Q	61.75	33.75	32.00	61.75	9
Lars Ruchti	Men's big air	75.50	73.00	75.50	12	Did not advance				
Lars Ruchti	Men's slopestyle	27.75	87.75	87.75	3 Q	63.00	42.00	55.00	63.00	7

== Ice hockey ==
Switzerland qualified a team of eighteen ice hockey players for the women's six-team tournament.

Roster

Celine Abgottspon served as head coach, Melanie Häfliger and Iris Müller were assistant coaches, and Andreas Ellenberger was goalkeeper coach.

- Jil May Baker – A
- Lorie-Lou Besson
- Luana Birstiel
- Miriana Bottoni
- Valentina Camenzind
- Mila Croll
- Hannah Estermann
- Alicia Skye Fausch
- Anne-Eugénie Gendre
- Laure Mériguet
- Shayna Angelina Merkofer
- Sarina Messikommer
- Norina Müller – C
- Anaïs Rohner
- Maëlle Rohner
- Norina Schrupkowski
- Livia Tschannen – A
- Marlen Wälti

Summary

Key:

- GWS – Game winning shots
- Q – Qualified

Team	Event	Group stage			Semifinal	Final	
Team	Event	Opponent Score	Opponent Score	Rank	Opponent Score	Opponent Score	Rank
Switzerland	Women's tournament	France; W 2–0	Germany; W 2–1	Q	Japan; L 1–2	Germany; L 1–3	4

=== Women's tournament ===
Preliminary round, Group B

Pos	Team	Pld	W	SOW	SOL	L	GF	GA	GD	Pts	Qualification
1	Switzerland	2	2	0	0	0	4	1	+3	6	Semifinals
2	Germany	2	1	0	0	1	5	2	+3	3	Semifinals
3	France	2	0	0	0	2	0	6	−6	0	

Source: IOC

27 January 2024; 17:00	France	0–2 (0–1, 0–0, 0–1)	Switzerland	Gangneung Hockey Centre; Attendance: 1,742

Game reference
Louna Ivaldy	Goalies	Valentina Camenzind	Referees: (Mexico) María Chávez (Canada) Beatrice Fortin; Linesmen: (Switzerland) Domenica Maurer (United States) Laura Schmidlein
0–1 / 13:20 – Tschannen (SH); 0–2 / 36:43 – Müller			Referees: (Mexico) María Chávez (Canada) Beatrice Fortin; Linesmen: (Switzerland) Domenica Maurer (United States) Laura Schmidlein
3 min	Penalties	3 min	Referees: (Mexico) María Chávez (Canada) Beatrice Fortin; Linesmen: (Switzerland) Domenica Maurer (United States) Laura Schmidlein
13	Shots	29	Referees: (Mexico) María Chávez (Canada) Beatrice Fortin; Linesmen: (Switzerland) Domenica Maurer (United States) Laura Schmidlein

29 January 2024; 17:00	Switzerland	2–1 (0–0, 1–0, 1–1)	Germany	Gangneung Hockey Centre; Attendance: 2,219

Game reference

Norina Schrupkowski
Goalies
Tara Bach
Referees:
(China) Ding Siwen
(Malaysia) Wan Mei Wah
Linesmen:
(Ukraine) Anhelina Maifeld
(Switzerland) Domenica Maurer

Tschannen (Birnstiel) – 23:49	1–0
Rohner (Wälti) – 36:06	2–0
	2–1	41:38 – Wintgen

4.5 min
Penalties
4.5 min
19
Shots
19

Semifinals

30 January 2024; 17:00	Switzerland	1–2 (1–1, 0–1, 0–0)	Japan	Gangneung Hockey Centre; Attendance: 1,083

Game reference

Valentina Camenzind
Goalies
Suzuno Fukuda
Referees:
(Mexico) María Chávez
(Canada) Beatrice Fortin
Linesmen:
(Ukraine) Anhelina Maifeld
(Switzerland) Domenica Maurer

Müller – 10:06	1–0
	1–1	10:38 – Fukuzawa (Ruike)
	1–2	24:26 – Numabe (Odaira, Tada) (PP)

7.5 min
Penalties
1.5 min
12
Shots
20

Bronze medal match

31 January 2024; 10:00	Switzerland	1–3 (0–2, 1–0, 0–1)	Germany	Gangneung Hockey Centre; Attendance: 1,911

Game reference

Valentina Camenzind
Norina Schrupkowski
Goalies
Tara Bach
Referees:
(Mexico) María Chávez
(Malaysia) Wan Mei Wah
Linesmen:
(Germany) Lara Fischer
(Switzerland) Domenica Maurer

	0–1	03:32 – Birka (Seyrer)
	0–2	04:20 – Zielinski (Seyrer, Birka) (PP)
Tschannen (Mériguet) – 21:56	1–2
	1–3	44:32 – Weichenhain (ENG)

6 min
Penalties
3 min
24
Shots
26

== Nordic combined ==
Athlete	Event	Ski jumping				Cross-country	
Athlete	Event	Distance	Points	Rank	Deficit	Time	Rank
Finn Kempf	Men's normal hill/6 km	100.0	120.7	9	+1:21	15:00.7	8
Noé Kempf	Men's normal hill/6 km	88.0	86.1	24	+3:40	17:03.6	20
Giulia Belz	Women's normal hill/4 km	83.0	75.1	18	+3:53	14:14.6	17

== Ski jumping ==
Switzerland qualified three ski jumpers (two men and one woman).

Athlete	Event	First round			Final			Total	
Athlete	Event	Distance	Points	Rank	Distance	Points	Rank	Points	Rank
Lars Künzle	Men's normal hill	67.5	38.2	36	68.5	32.9	37	71.1	37
Felix Trunz	Men's normal hill	103.5	110.1	4	101.0	98.9	8	209.0	4
Celina Wasser	Women's normal hill	69.5	34.8	23	65.0	28.8	27	63.6	26

== Snowboarding ==
Snowboard cross
Individual

Athlete	Event	Group heats		Semifinal	Final
Athlete	Event	Points	Rank	Rank	Rank
Jonas Aschilier	Men's snowboard cross	12	11	Did not advance	
Noah Kocherhans	Men's snowboard cross	13	8	Did not advance	
Nuria Gubser	Women's snowboard cross	13	9	Did not advance	
Noémie Wiedmer	Women's snowboard cross	19	1 Q	1 FA	1st place, gold medalist(s)

Mixed

Athlete	Event	Pre-heats	Quarterfinal	Semifinal	Final
Athlete	Event	Position	Position	Position	Position
Noah Kocherhans; Noémie Wiedmer	Team snowboard cross	—N/a	2 Q	2 FA	4
Jonas Aschilier; Nuria Gubser	Team snowboard cross	—N/a	3	Did not advance	

Halfpipe, Slopestyle & Big Air

Athlete	Event	Qualification				Final				
Athlete	Event	Run 1	Run 2	Best	Rank	Run 1	Run 2	Run 3	Best	Rank
Jonas Hasler	Men's halfpipe	73.75	77.75	77.75	4 Q	78.00	70.50	16.00	78.00	6
Reef Hasler	Men's slopestyle	44.50	55.50	55.50	8 Q	12.75	49.00	10.25	49.00	8
Reef Hasler	Men's big air	47.75	14.25	47.75	16	Did not advance				
Reef Hasler	Men's halfpipe	50.75	23.50	50.75	12	Did not advance				
Mischa Zürcher	Men's slopestyle	39.75	29.50	39.75	12	Did not advance				
Mischa Zürcher	Men's big air	35.75	52.75	52.75	14	Did not advance				
Mischa Zürcher	Men's halfpipe	63.50	67.50	67.50	8 Q	59.75	70.25	42.00	70.25	7
Lura Wick	Women's halfpipe	66.25	71.50	71.50	5 Q	78.00	35.00	74.75	78.00	3rd place, bronze medalist(s)

== Speed skating ==
Distance

Athlete	Event	Time	Rank
Nevio Gross	Men's 500 m	42.03	29
Nevio Gross	Men's 1500 m	2:02.40	22

Mass Start

Athlete	Event	Semifinal			Final		
Athlete	Event	Points	Time	Rank	Points	Time	Rank
Nevio Gross	Men's mass start	0	5:33.59	9	Did not advance		

== See also ==
- Switzerland at the 2024 Summer Olympics
