= Nordic combined at the 2024 Winter Youth Olympics – Women's individual normal hill/4 km =

Women's individual normal hill/6 km at the IV Winter Youth Olympic Games
- Venue: Alpensia Ski Jumping Centre; Alpensia Biathlon Centre
- Dates: 29 January
- Competitors: 21 from 11 nations

Medalists
1st place, gold medalist(s)		Minja Korhonen	Finland
2nd place, silver medalist(s)		Teja Pavec	Slovenia
3rd place, bronze medalist(s)		Tia Malovrh	Slovenia

The women's individual normal hill/6 km Nordic combined competition at the 2024 Winter Youth Olympics was held on 28 January at the Alpensia Ski Jumping Centre and Alpensia Biathlon Centre.

== Results ==
=== Ski jumping ===
The ski jumping part was held at 11:30.

Rank	Bib	Name	Country	Distance (m)	Points	Time difference
1	13	Minja Korhonen	Finland	103.5	133.3	0:00
2	16	Teja Pavec	Slovenia	100.0	128.6	+0:19
3	1	Heta Hirvonen	Finland	100.0	118.6	+0:59
4	6	Tia Malovrh	Slovenia	100.0	118.0	+1:01
5	15	Ingrid Låte	Norway	103.0	115.0	+1:32
6	19	Romane Baud	France	94.5	110.3	+1:32
7	4	Anna Senoner	Italy	94.5	107.0	+1:45
8	10	Jui Yamazaki	Japan	96.5	106.6	+1:47
9	12	Ella Wilson	United States	95.5	104.6	+1:55
10	21	Giada Delugan	Italy	95.5	103.3	+2:00
11	5	Nora Helene Evans	Norway	94.0	102.6	+2:03
12	3	Marion Droz Vincent	France	86.5	96.8	+2:26
13	8	Clara Mentil	Austria	93.0	95.2	+2:32
14	14	Sofia Eggensberger	Germany	89.0	90.0	+2:53
15	18	Yuzuka Fujiwara	Japan	88.0	89.8	+2:54
16	2	Kai McKinnon	United States	83.0	78.8	+3:38
17	9	Mara-Jolie Schlossarek	Germany	84.0	77.5	+3:43
18	11	Giulia Belz	Switzerland	83.0	75.1	+3:53
19	20	Katharina Gruber	Austria	76.5	61.5	+4:47
20	17	Natálie Nejedlová	Czech Republic	73.0	57.5	+5:03
21	7	Karolína Horká	Czech Republic	50.0	4.1	+8:37

=== Cross-country ===
The cross-country part was held at 15:00.

Rank	Bib	Name	Country	Start time	Cross-country time	Cross-country rank	Finish time	Deficit
1st place, gold medalist(s)	1	Minja Korhonen	Finland	0:00	10:02.7	2	10:02.7	
2nd place, silver medalist(s)	2	Teja Pavec	Slovenia	0:19	10:30.9	8	10:49.9	+47.2
3rd place, bronze medalist(s)	4	Tia Malovrh	Slovenia	1:01	10:13.0	3	11:14.0	+1:11.3
4	3	Heta Hirvonen	Finland	0:59	10:30.5	7	11:29.5	+1:26.8
5	5	Ingrid Låte	Norway	1:13	11:00.9	16	12:13.9	+2:11.2
6	10	Giada Delugan	Italy	2:00	10:16.6	4	12:16.6	+2:13.9
7	8	Jui Yamazaki	Japan	1:47	10:34.3	10	12:21.3	+2:18.6
8	6	Romane Baud	France	1:32	10:53.7	12	12:25.7	+2:23.0
9	15	Yuzuka Fujiwara	Japan	2:54	9:41.7	1	12:35.7	+2:33.0
10	7	Anna Senoner	Italy	1:45	11:01.5	18	12:46.5	+2:43.8
11	9	Ella Wilson	United States	1:55	10:55.3	14	12:50.3	+2:47.6
12	12	Marion Droz Vincent	France	2:26	10:48.3	11	13:14.3	+3:11.6
13	11	Nora Helene Evans	Norway	2:03	11:29.0	20	13:32.0	+3:29.3
14	14	Sofia Eggensberger	Germany	2:53	10:53.9	13	13:46.9	+3:44.2
15	13	Clara Mentil	Austria	2:32	11:26.3	9	13:58.3	+3:55.6
16	16	Kai McKinnon	United States	3:38	10:25.9	6	14:03.9	+4:01.2
17	18	Giulia Belz	Switzerland	3:53	10:21.6	5	14:14.6	+4:11.9
18	17	Mara-Jolie Schlossarek	Germany	3:43	11:01.2	17	14:44.2	+4:41.5
19	19	Katharina Gruber	Austria	4:47	10:33.3	9	15:20.3	+5:17.6
20	20	Natálie Nejedlová	Czech Republic	5:03	13:27.1	21	18:30.1	+8:27.4
21	21	Karolína Horká	Czech Republic	8:37	10:59.9	15	19:36.9	+9:34.2
