= Argentina at the 2024 Winter Youth Olympics =

- Flag of Argentina
- IOC code: ARG
- NOC: Argentine Olympic Committee

in Gangwon, South Korea 19 January 2024 – 1 February 2024
- Competitors: 7 in 3 sports
- Flag bearer (opening): Nicolas Quintero
- Flag bearer (closing): TBD
- Medals: Gold 0 Silver 0 Bronze 0 Total 0

Winter Youth Olympics appearances (overview)
- 2012; 2016; 2020; 2024

Argentina is scheduled to compete at the 2024 Winter Youth Olympics in Gangwon, South Korea, from January 19 to February 1, 2024. This will be Argentina's fourth appearance at the Winter Youth Olympic Games, having competed at every Games since the inaugural edition in 2012.

The Argentinian team consisted of seven athletes (three men and four women) competing in three sports. Alpine skier Nicolas Quintero was the country's flagbearer during the opening ceremony.

== Competitors ==
The following is the list of number of competitors (per gender) participating at the games per sport/discipline.

Sport	Men	Women	Total
Alpine skiing	1	2	3
Cross-country skiing	1	2	3
Freestyle skiing	1	0	1
Total	3	4	7

== Alpine skiing ==
Argentina qualified three alpine skiers (one man and two women).

Athlete	Event	Run 1		Run 2		Total	
Athlete	Event	Time	Rank	Time	Rank	Time	Rank
Nicolas Quintero	Men's super-G	—N/a				54.98	6
Nicolas Quintero	Men's giant slalom	50.89	17	47.70	21	1:38.59	19
Nicolas Quintero	Men's slalom	48.59	17	53.01	9	1:41:60	9
Nicolas Quintero	Men's combined	54.89	7	56.93	21	1:51.82	14
Milla Anwandter	Women's super-G	—N/a				58.27	39
Milla Anwandter	Women's giant slalom	54.51	33	58.42	28	1:52.93	28
Milla Anwandter	Women's slalom	56.18	39	54.17	29	1:50.35	29
Milla Anwandter	Women's combined	59.33	33	57.39	27	1:56.72	25
Jázmin Fernández	Women's super-G	—N/a				54.72	12
Jázmin Fernández	Women's giant slalom	55.96	37	DQ			
Jázmin Fernández	Women's slalom	56.89	42	DNF			
Jázmin Fernández	Women's combined	58.53	24	DQ			

Mixed

Athlete	Event	Round of 16	Quarterfinals	Semifinals	Final / BM	
Athlete	Event	Opposition Result	Opposition Result	Opposition Result	Opposition Result	Rank
Milla Anwandter; Nicolas Quintero	Parallel mixed team	Italy; L 1–3	Did not advance			

== Cross-country skiing ==
Argentina qualified three cross-country skiers (one man and two women).

Men

Athlete	Event	Qualification		Quarterfinal		Semifinal		Final	
Athlete	Event	Time	Rank	Time	Rank	Time	Rank	Time	Rank
Justo Estévez	7.5 km classical	—N/a						23:13.1	51
Justo Estévez	Sprint freestyle	3:29.37	53	Did not advance					

Women

Athlete	Event	Qualification		Quarterfinal		Semifinal		Final	
Athlete	Event	Time	Rank	Time	Rank	Time	Rank	Time	Rank
Paloma Angelino	7.5 km classical	—N/a						29:18.8	58
Paloma Angelino	Sprint freestyle	4:35.69	65	Did not advance					
Maíra Fernández	7.5 km classical	—N/a						26:05.2	42
Maíra Fernández	Sprint freestyle	4:04.48	48	Did not advance					

== Freestyle skiing ==
Halfpipe, Slopestyle & Big Air

Athlete	Event	Qualification				Final				
Athlete	Event	Run 1	Run 2	Best	Rank	Run 1	Run 2	Run 3	Best	Rank
Santiago Magni	Boys' big air	39.50	53.50	53.50	18	Did Not Advance				
Santiago Magni	Boys' slopestyle	30.00	8.00	30.00	20	Did Not Advance				

== See also ==
- Argentina at the 2024 Summer Olympics
