= Alpine skiing at the 2024 Winter Youth Olympics – Men's combined =

Men's combined at the IV Winter Youth Olympic Games
- Venue: High1 Resort, South Korea
- Date: 22 January 2024
- Competitors: 56 from 37 nations
- Winning time: 1:49.46

Medalists
1st place, gold medalist(s)		Zak Carrick-Smith	Great Britain
2nd place, silver medalist(s)		Alexander Ax Swartz	Sweden
3rd place, bronze medalist(s)		Liam Liljenborg	Sweden

The men's combined competition of the 2024 Winter Youth Olympics was held at the High1 Resort, Jeongseon, South Korea, on Monday, 22 January 2024.

== Results ==
The super-G was started at 10:20 and the slalom was started at 14:15.

Rank	Bib	Name	Country	Super-G	Rank	Slalom	Rank	Total	Diff
1st place, gold medalist(s)	11	Zak Carrick-Smith	Great Britain	56.33	27	53.13	1	1:49.46	
2nd place, silver medalist(s)	53	Alexander Ax Swartz	Sweden	56.21	26	53.38	2	1:49.59	+0.13
3rd place, bronze medalist(s)	1	Liam Liljenborg	Sweden	54.52	4	55.78	9	1:50.30	+0.84
4	3	Miha Oserban	Slovenia	55.15	9	55.21	5	1:50.36	+0.90
5	8	Andrej Barnáš	Slovakia	55.76	17	54.64	3	1:50.40	+0.94
6	29	Elliot Westlund	Sweden	54.35	1	56.08	14	1:50.43	+0.97
7	28	Jevin Palmquist	United States	55.33	11	55.22	6	1:50.55	+1.09
8	17	Asaja Sturm	Austria	55.46	13	55.27	7	1:50.73	+1.27
8	7	Nash Huot-Marchand	France	54.68	5	56.05	13	1:50.73	+1.27
10	22	Lars Horvath	Germany	55.95	21	54.95	4	1:50.90	+1.44
11	18	Leo Scherer	Germany	54.92	8	56.10	15	1:51.02	+1.56
12	2	Leon Hafner	Austria	54.40	2	56.73	19	1:51.13	+1.67
13	32	Zacchaeus Poulsen	France	55.36	12	55.85	11	1:51.21	+1.75
14	23	Stanisław Sarzyński	Poland	56.02	22	55.80	10	1:51.82	+2.36
14	20	Nicolás Quintero	Argentina	54.89	7	56.93	21	1:51.82	+2.36
16	13	Robert Clarke	Switzerland	54.71	6	57.35	23	1:52.06	+2.60
17	16	Edoardo Simonelli	Italy	55.85	18	56.26	16	1:52.11	+2.65
18	30	Stewart Bruce	United States	56.20	25	55.95	12	1:52.15	+2.69
19	4	Gal Hajdinjak	Slovenia	55.94	20	56.37	17	1:52.31	+2.85
20	12	Yanis Häusermann	Switzerland	55.51	14	57.23	22	1:52.74	+3.28
21	48	Neo Kamada	Japan	57.36	36	55.39	8	1:52.75	+3.29
22	9	Daniel Palič	Slovakia	56.03	23	56.88	20	1:52.91	+3.45
23	27	Salvador Cornella Guitart	Andorra	56.48	29	56.45	18	1:52.93	+3.47
24	10	Romain Monney	Switzerland	57.26	34	58.11	24	1:55.37	+5.91
25	36	Altti Pyrrö	Finland	57.29	35	58.61	25	1:55.90	+6.44
26	37	Emeric Guerrillot	Portugal	57.80	37	58.80	26	1:56.60	+7.14
27	39	Apostolos Vougioukas	Greece	56.78	32	1:00.20	27	1:56.98	+7.52
28	42	Milan Schneider	Hungary	55.52	15	1:02.49	32	1:58.01	+8.55
29	44	Hugo Leonelli	Monaco	57.84	38	1:01.67	30	1:59.51	+10.05
30	56	Lee Hyun-ho	South Korea	59.22	45	1:00.86	28	2:00.08	+10.62
31	38	Luca Poberai	Lithuania	58.73	43	1:01.39	29	2:00.12	+10.66
32	24	Oleksandr Patsahan	Ukraine	59.48	47	1:01.69	31	2:01.17	+11.71
33	25	Finlay Wilson	Ireland	57.97	39	1:03.51	34	2:00.48	+12.02
34	41	Rauan Raimkulov	Uzbekistan	59.72	48	1:02.87	33	2:02.59	+13.13
35	40	Issa Laborde Dit Pere	Kenya	59.23	46	1:06.56	35	2:05.79	+16.33
36	47	Wang Shuai	China	1:02.72	50	1:10.99	36	2:13.71	+24.25
	5	Roman Rogue	France	55.69	16	Did not finish			
	6	Jaka Škrjanc	Slovenia	56.89	33	Did not finish			
	14	Ziggy Vrdoljak	Croatia	56.61	30	Did not finish			
	15	Benno Brandis	Germany	54.47	3	Did not finish			
	19	Jonas Feichter	Italy	55.24	10	Did not finish			
	21	Timur Shakirov	Kyrgyzstan	58.92	44	Did not finish			
	26	Florian Neumayer	Austria	55.89	19	Did not finish			
	31	Noah Gianesini	Liechtenstein	56.39	28	Did not finish			
	35	Hemi Meikle	New Zealand	56.08	24	Did not finish			
	43	Kim Se-hyun	South Korea	58.29	40	Did not finish			
	45	Rostislav Khokhlov	Kazakhstan	58.68	42	Did not finish			
	46	Noah Miljković	Bosnia and Herzegovina	58.46	41	Did not finish			
	51	Pietro Scesa	Italy	56.72	31	Did not finish			
	52	Pauls Pēteris Pracans	Latvia	1:00.54	49	Did not finish			
	33	Thomas Carnahan	Canada	Did not finish					
	34	Urho Rechardt	Finland	Did not finish					
	54	Markus Mesila	Estonia	Did not finish					
	55	Kim Joo-hyoun	South Korea	Did not finish					
	49	Ali Boloukat	Iran	Did not start					
	50	Henri Rivers IV	Jamaica	Did not start					
