= Finland at the 2024 Winter Youth Olympics =

- Flag of Finland
- IOC code: FIN
- NOC: Finnish Olympic Committee

in Gangwon, South Korea 19 January 2024 – 1 February 2024
- Competitors: 51 in 10 sports
- Flag bearers (opening): Eeli Keranen & Hanni Koski
- Flag bearer (closing): TBD
- Medals Ranked 13th: Gold 3 Silver 0 Bronze 4 Total 7

Winter Youth Olympics appearances
- 2012; 2016; 2020; 2024

Finland is scheduled to compete at the 2024 Winter Youth Olympics in Gangwon, South Korea, from January 19 to February 1, 2024. This will be Finland's fourth appearance at the Winter Youth Olympic Games, having competed at every Games since the inaugural edition in 2012.

The Finnish team consisted of 51 athletes (36 men and 15 women) competing in ten sports. Ski jumper Eeli Keranen and biathlete/cross-country skier Hanni Koski were the country's flagbearers during the opening ceremony.

== Competitors ==
The following is the list of number of competitors (per gender) participating at the games per sport/discipline.

Sport	Men	Women	Total
Alpine skiing	2	3	5
Biathlon	4	4	8
Cross-country skiing*	3	3	6
Figure skating	0	1	1
Freestyle skiing	3	1	4
Ice hockey	18	0	18
Nordic combined	2	2	4
Ski jumping	2	2	4
Snowboarding	1	0	1
Speed skating	1	0	1
Total	36	15	51

- Hanni Koski will compete in both biathlon and cross-country skiing. Her total is counted once in the overall number.

== Medalists ==
Medal	Name	Sport	Event	Date
Gold	Minja Korhonen	Nordic combined	Women's individual normal hill/4 km	29 January
Gold	Nelli-Lotta Karppelin	Cross-country skiing	Women's 7.5 km classical	30 January
Gold	Eemeli Kurttila; Heta Hirvonen; Minja Korhonen; Peter Räisänen	Nordic combined	Mixed team normal hill/4 × 3.3 km	31 January
Bronze	Jaakko Koskinen	Freestyle skiing	Men's slopestyle	25 January
Bronze	Amelie Björksten; Altti Pyrrö	Alpine skiing	Parallel mixed team	26 January
Bronze	Nelli-Lotta Karppelin	Cross-country skiing	Women's sprint	29 January
Bronze	Finland men's national under-16 ice hockey team	Ice hockey	Men's tournament	31 January

== Alpine skiing ==
Finland qualified five alpine skiers (two men and three women).

Men

Athlete	Event	Run 1		Run 2		Total	
Athlete	Event	Time	Rank	Time	Rank	Time	Rank
Altti Pyrrö	Super-G	—N/a				55.90	21
Altti Pyrrö	Giant slalom	Did not start					
Altti Pyrrö	Slalom	48.38	15	53.55	12	1:41.93	11
Altti Pyrrö	Combined	57.29	35	58.61	25	1:55.90	25
Urho Rechardt	Super-G	—N/a				56.19	26
Urho Rechardt	Giant slalom	51.18	22	47.80	22	1:38.98	22
Urho Rechardt	Slalom	Did not finish					
Urho Rechardt	Combined	Did not finish					

Women

Athlete	Event	Run 1		Run 2		Total	
Athlete	Event	Time	Rank	Time	Rank	Time	Rank
Amelie Björksten	Super-G	—N/a				56.25	25
Amelie Björksten	Giant slalom	49.88	12	52.91	5	1:42.79	7
Amelie Björksten	Slalom	52.08	16	49.11	8	1:41.19	11
Amelie Björksten	Combined	58.44	21	Did not finish			
Aada Marttila	Super-G	—N/a				Did not finish	
Aada Marttila	Giant slalom	Did not finish					
Aada Marttila	Slalom	Did not finish					
Aada Marttila	Combined	Did not finish					
Kia Suni	Super-G	—N/a				56.21	24
Kia Suni	Giant slalom	51.53	21	Did not finish			
Kia Suni	Slalom	53.83	28	Did not finish			
Kia Suni	Combined	59.11	30	52.79	10	1:51.90	18

Mixed

Athlete	Event	Round of 16	Quarterfinals	Semifinals	Final / BM	
Athlete	Event	Opposition Result	Opposition Result	Opposition Result	Opposition Result	Rank
Amelie Björksten; Altti Pyrrö	Parallel mixed team	Slovenia; W 3–2	Switzerland; W 2*–2	Sweden; L 0–4	United States; W 2*–2	3rd place, bronze medalist(s)

== Biathlon ==
Men

Athlete	Event	Time	Misses	Rank
Akseli Kirjavainen	Sprint	24:59.9	4 (1+3)	57
Akseli Kirjavainen	Individual	47:59.5	6 (0+3+0+3)	36
Eemil Koskinen	Sprint	24:02.7	5 (3+2)	36
Eemil Koskinen	Individual	50:14.0	9 (3+3+2+1)	62
Arttu Remes	Sprint	25:35.2	6 (1+5)	67
Arttu Remes	Individual	50:39.8	10 (3+2+2+3)	66
Kaapo Saarinen	Sprint	23:23.7	3 (3+0)	21
Kaapo Saarinen	Individual	48:59.4	6 (2+3+0+1)	52

Women

Athlete	Event	Time	Misses	Rank
Eveliina Hakala	Sprint	22:23.4	4 (0+4)	25
Eveliina Hakala	Individual	42:30.8	6 (0+3+0+3)	24
Hanni Koski	Sprint	24:08.2	5 (4+1)	45
Hanni Koski	Individual	44:25.4	7 (2+4+1+0)	49
Erika Kujala	Sprint	24:01.9	7 (2+5)	42
Erika Kujala	Individual	42:49.8	6 (0+3+1+2)	28
Ilona Rantakömi	Sprint	21:35.6	1 (0+1)	13
Ilona Rantakömi	Individual	43:46.1	5 (1+2+0+2)	39

Mixed

Athletes	Event	Time	Misses	Rank
Eveliina Hakala; Akseli Kirjavainen	Single mixed relay	48:53.7	2+18	15
Eveliina Hakala; Ilona Rantakömi; Eemil Koskinen; Kaapo Saarinen	Mixed relay	1:25:59.0	10+22	13

== Cross-country skiing ==
Finland qualified six cross-country skiers (three per gender).

Men

Athlete	Event	Qualification		Quarterfinal		Semifinal		Final	
Athlete	Event	Time	Rank	Time	Rank	Time	Rank	Time	Rank
Leevi Passila	7.5 km classical	—N/a						21:40.2	36
Leevi Passila	Sprint freestyle	3:08.39	10 Q	3:04.99	4	Did not advance			
Kalle Tossavainen	7.5 km classical	—N/a						20:44.6	15
Kalle Tossavainen	Sprint freestyle	3:06.12	5 Q	3:10.89	3	Did not advance			
Topias Vuorela	7.5 km classical	—N/a						20:15.5	6
Topias Vuorela	Sprint freestyle	3:14.58	33	Did not advance					

Women

Athlete	Event	Qualification		Quarterfinal		Semifinal		Final	
Athlete	Event	Time	Rank	Time	Rank	Time	Rank	Time	Rank
Signe Jakobsson	7.5 km classical	—N/a						26:25.8	45
Signe Jakobsson	Sprint freestyle	3:51.09	34	Did not advance					
Nelli-Lotta Karppelin	7.5 km classical	—N/a						22:19.6	1st place, gold medalist(s)
Nelli-Lotta Karppelin	Sprint freestyle	3:31.60	3 Q	3:33.31	1 Q	3:36.45	1 Q	3:34.46	3rd place, bronze medalist(s)
Hanni Koski	7.5 km classical	—N/a						23:17.9	14
Hanni Koski	Sprint freestyle	3:39.22	14 Q	3:39.31	1 Q	3:48.59	6	Did not advance	

Mixed

Athlete	Event	Time	Rank
Hanni Koski; Topias Vuorela; Nelli-Lotta Karppelin; Kalle Tossavainen	Mixed relay	54:29.8	8

== Figure skating ==
Athlete	Event	SP/SD		FS/FD		Total	
Athlete	Event	Points	Rank	Points	Rank	Points	Rank
Iida Karhunen	Women's singles	55.04	11	111.84	7	166.88	8

== Freestyle skiing ==
Dual moguls

Athlete	Event	Group Stage						Semifinals	Final / BM	
Athlete	Event	Opposition Result	Opposition Result	Opposition Result	Opposition Result	Points	Rank	Opposition Result	Opposition Result	Rank
Eero Lampi	Men's dual moguls	Huff (USA); L 2–3	Gianella (SUI); W 3–2	Gravenfors (SWE); W 3–2	Long (CHN); L 2–3	10	3	Did not advance		

Halfpipe, Slopestyle & Big Air

Athlete	Event	Qualification				Final				
Athlete	Event	Run 1	Run 2	Best	Rank	Run 1	Run 2	Run 3	Best	Rank
Jaakko Koskinen	Men's big air	81.00	76.00	81.00	7 Q	18.50	61.75	45.25	107.00	8
Jaakko Koskinen	Men's slopestyle	69.50	80.00	80.00	6 Q	82.75	78.25	83.75	83.75	3rd place, bronze medalist(s)
Aimo Mandelin	Men's big air	54.25	79.00	79.00	8 Q	76.25	90.25	44.25	166.50	4
Aimo Mandelin	Men's slopestyle	7.25	6.75	7.25	24	Did not advance				
Lina Häggström	Women's slopestyle	23.50	DNS	23.50	17	Did not advance				

== Ice hockey ==
Finland qualified a men's hockey team of 18 athletes.

Summary

Key:

- OT – Overtime
- GWS – Match decided by game winning shots

Team	Event	Group stage			Semifinal	Final	
Team	Event	Opposition Score	Opposition Score	Rank	Opposition Score	Opposition Score	Rank
Finland	Men's tournament	South Korea; W 3–1	Canada; L 1–4	2nd	Czech Republic; L 1–3	Canada; W 5–4 GWS	3rd place, bronze medalist(s)

=== Men's tournament ===
Group B

Pos	Team	Pld	W	SOW	SOL	L	GF	GA	GD	Pts	Qualification
1	Canada	2	2	0	0	0	12	1	+11	6	Semifinals
2	Finland	2	1	0	0	1	4	5	−1	3	Semifinals
3	South Korea (H)	2	0	0	0	2	1	11	−10	0	

Source: Gangwon 2024
(H) Host

28 January 2024; 20:00	Finland	3–1 (1–1, 2–0, 0–0)	South Korea	Gangneung Hockey Centre; Attendance: 3,713

Game reference

William Gammals
Goalies
Lim Jae-hun
Referees:
(Denmark) Rasmus Ankersen
(United Kingdom) Joseph Sewell
Linesmen:
(Czech Republic) David Thuma
(Sweden) Niclas Westman

	0–1	01:01 – Gong (Lee S.)
Arkko (Alalauri, Kähkönen) – 11:05	1–1
Myllyniemi – 24:31	2–1
Torkki (Järvenpää, Kähkönen) – 28:53	3–1

1.5 min
Penalties
1.5 min
46
Shots
8

29 January 2024; 20:00	Canada	4–1 (1–0, 0–0, 3–1)	Finland	Gangneung Hockey Centre; Attendance: 2,083

Game reference

Carter Esler
Goalies
Pyry Lammi
Referees:
(Denmark) Rasmus Ankersen
(Norway) Oskar Øvstedal
Linesmen:
(South Korea) Lim Jun-seo
(Czech Republic) David Thuma

Di Iorio (Edwards) – 11:40	1–0
Di Iorio (Chartrand) – 35:03	2–0
Lin (SH2) – 37:52	3–0
	3–1	38:32 – Alalauri (Piiparinen, Suvanto) (PP2)
Di Iorio (O'Donnell) (ENG) – 43:20	4–1

9 min
Penalties
4.5 min
39
Shots
19

Semifinals

30 January 2024; 14:00	Czech Republic	3–1 (0–0, 3–0, 0–1)	Finland	Gangneung Hockey Centre; Attendance: 3,448

Game reference

Jan Láryš
Martin Psohlavec
Goalies
Pyry Lammi
Referees:
(Canada) Mathieu Boudreau
(Netherlands) Adler Steenstra
Linesmen:
(South Korea) Lim Jun-seo
(Uzbekistan) David Prokofyev

Nedorost (Ruml, Bělohorský) (PP2) – 17:14	1–0
Bělohorský (Reisnecker) – 19:06	2–0
Novák (Vaněček, Katolický) – 29:11	3–0
	3–1	34:32 – Kähkönen (Arkko, Torkki)

4.5 min
Penalties
7.5 min
33
Shots
25

Bronze medal game

31 January 2024; 13:00	Canada	4–5 GWS (3–2, 0–2, 1–0) (SO: 0–1)	Finland	Gangneung Hockey Centre; Attendance: 4,652

Game reference

Carter Esler
Goalies
William Gammals
Pyry Lammi
Referees:
(Norway) Oskar Øvstedal
(United Kingdom) Joseph Sewell
Linesmen:
(South Korea) Lim Jun-seo
(Sweden) Niclas Westman

Di Iorio (Edwards) – 06:15	1–0
Lawrence (Lin, O'Donnell) – 06:46	2–0
Verhoeff (Wassilyn) – 06:58	3–0
	3–1	07:27 – Laitinen (Myllyniemi, Rinne)
	3–2	08:20 – Arkko (Kähkönen, Kallio) (PP)
	3–3	25:34 – Kallio (Nuutinen, Suvanto)
	3–4	27:18 – Kähkönen (Arkko, Piiparinen) (PP)
Preston (Lin) – 38:58	4–4

Preston (miss)
Valentini (miss)
Shootout
Uronen
Myllyniemi
7.5 min
Penalties
1.5 min
36
Shots
37

== Nordic combined ==
Individual

Athlete	Event	Ski jumping				Cross-country	
Athlete	Event	Distance	Points	Rank	Deficit	Time	Rank
Eemeli Kurttila	Men's normal hill/6 km	107.0	132.6	3	+0:34	14:43.1	7
Peter Räisänen	Men's normal hill/6 km	88.0	91.5	21	+3:18	16:44.9	18
Heta Hirvonen	Women's normal hill/4 km	100.0	118.6	3	+0:59	11:29.5	4
Minja Korhonen	Women's normal hill/4 km	103.5	133.3	1	0:00	10:02.7	1st place, gold medalist(s)

Team

Athlete	Event	Ski jumping			Cross-country	
Athlete	Event	Points	Rank	Deficit	Time	Rank
Heta Hirvonen; Peter Räisänen; Eemeli Kurttila; Minja Korhonen	Mixed team	435.8	2	+0:13	33:56.2	1st place, gold medalist(s)

== Ski jumping ==
Finland qualified four ski jumpers (two per gender).

Individual

Athlete	Event	First round			Final			Total	
Athlete	Event	Distance	Points	Rank	Distance	Points	Rank	Points	Rank
Eeli Keränen	Men's normal hill	90.5	81.8	17	92.0	82.8	15	164.6	15
Juho Ojala	Men's normal hill	74.0	44.8	33	76.5	49.2	33	94.0	34
Sofia Mattila	Women's normal hill	96.0	90.0	5	94.0	83.6	10	173.6	8
Emilia Vidgren	Women's normal hill	65.0	23.5	27	76.0	50.8	20	74.3	24

Team

Athlete	Event	First round				Final				Total	
Athlete	Event	Distance	Points	Team points	Rank	Distance	Points	Team points	Rank	Points	Rank
Sofia Mattila; Juho Ojala; Emilia Vidgren; Eeli Keränen	Mixed team	90.5; 88.5; 75.0; 84.5	83.9; 81.7; 51.6; 74.7	291.9	11	86.0; 80.5; 74.0; 87.0	80.7; 72.4; 55.1; 83.4	291.6	10	583.5	10

== Snowboarding ==
Halfpipe, Slopestyle & Big Air

Athlete	Event	Qualification				Final				
Athlete	Event	Run 1	Run 2	Best	Rank	Run 1	Run 2	Run 3	Best	Rank
Erik Jurmu	Men's slopestyle	53.25	23.25	53.25	9 Q	50.75	21.75	20.75	50.75	7
Erik Jurmu	Men's big air	10.00	10.25	10.25	20	Did not advance				

== Speed skating ==
Distance

Athlete	Event	Time	Rank
Eeka Rintala	Men's 500 m	42.04	30
Eeka Rintala	Men's 1500 m	2:12.74	30

Mass Start

Athlete	Event	Semifinal			Final		
Athlete	Event	Points	Time	Rank	Points	Time	Rank
Eeka Rintala	Men's mass start	0	5:58.86	15	Did not advance		

== See also ==
- Finland at the 2024 Summer Olympics
