= Nordic combined at the 2024 Winter Youth Olympics – Mixed team normal hill/4 × 3.3 km =

Mixed team normal hill/4 × 3.3 km at the IV Winter Youth Olympic Games
- Venue: Alpensia Ski Jumping Centre; Alpensia Biathlon Centre
- Dates: 31 January
- Competitors: 40 from 10 nations
- Winning time: 34:09.2

Medalists
1st place, gold medalist(s)		Eemeli Kurttila; Heta Hirvonen; Minja Korhonen; Peter Räisänen	Finland
2nd place, silver medalist(s)		Aljaž Janhar; Tia Malovrh; Teja Pavec; Lovro Percl Seručnik	Slovenia
3rd place, bronze medalist(s)		Bryan Venturini; Giada Delugan; Anna Senoner; Manuel Senoner	Italy

The mixed team normal hill/4 × 3.3 km Nordic combined competition at the 2024 Winter Youth Olympics was held on 31 January at the Alpensia Ski Jumping Centre and Alpensia Biathlon Centre.

== Results ==
=== Ski jumping ===
The ski jumping part was held at 11:42.

Rank	Bib	Country	Distance (m)	Points	Time difference
1	6; 6–1; 6–2; 6–3; 6–4	Norway; Nora Helene Evans; Sverre Kumar Lundeby; Erik Leiråmo; Ingrid Låte	91.0; 101.5; 101.0; 105.5	448.4; 96.1; 113.9; 114.9; 123.5	
2	10; 10–1; 10–2; 10–3; 10–4	Finland; Heta Hirvonen; Peter Räisänen; Eemeli Kurttila; Minja Korhonen	101.0; 87.0; 103.0; 102.0	435.8; 109.2; 85.5; 123.7; 117.4	+0:13
3	9; 9–1; 9–2; 9–3; 9–4	Italy; Giada Delugan; Bryan Venturini; Manuel Senoner; Anna Senoner	94.5; 90.0; 111.0; 99.0	433.4; 95.3; 90.2; 136.0; 111.9	+0:15
4	8; 8–1; 8–2; 8–3; 8–4	Austria; Katharina Gruber; Andreas Gfrerer; David Liegl; Clara Mentil	82.5; 106.0; 109.0; 89.5	425.2; 74.8; 133.2; 130.1; 87.1	+0:23
5	7; 7–1; 7–2; 7–3; 7–4	Germany; Mara-Jolie Schlossarek; Johann Unger; Jonathan Gräbert; Sofia Eggensberger	81.0; 102.0; 106.5; 83.0	403.2; 73.2; 119.5; 126.6; 83.9	+0:45
6	5; 5–1; 5–2; 5–3; 5–4	Slovenia; Tia Malovrh; Lovro Percl Seručnik; Aljaž Janhar; Teja Pavec	94.5; 91.5; 92.0; 95.5	402.7; 107.9; 94.9; 94.5; 105.4	+0:46
7	4; 4–1; 4–2; 4–3; 4–4	France; Romane Baud; Luc Balland; Lubin Martin; Marion Droz Vincent	102.5; 95.5; 86.5; 87.0	394.3; 115.5; 106.0; 82.7; 90.1	+0:54
8	1; 3–1; 3–2; 3–3; 3–4	Japan; Yuzuka Fujiwara; Kohtaro Kubota; Ruka Kudo; Jui Yamazaki	83.0; 95.5; 79.0; 93.5	354.1; 81.5; 106.7; 64.2; 101.7	+1:34
9	1; 1–1; 1–2; 1–3; 1–4	United States; Kai McKinnon; Arthur Tirone; Anders Giese; Ella Wilson	86.0; 79.0; 74.0; 83.0	285.8; 83.6; 65.3; 60.2; 76.7	+2:43
10	2; 2–1; 2–2; 2–3; 2–4	Czech Republic; Karolína Horká; Jan Kabeláč; Lukáš Doležal; Natálie Nejedlová	48.0; 83.5; 97.5; 71.5	242.9; 3.7; 78.1; 111.0; 50.1	+3:26

=== Cross-country ===
The cross-country part was held at 15:30.

Rank	Bib	Country	Start time	Cross-country time	Rank	Finish time	Deficit
1st place, gold medalist(s)	2; 2–1; 2–2; 2–3; 2–4	Finland; Eemeli Kurttila; Heta Hirvonen; Minja Korhonen; Peter Räisänen	0:13	33:56.2; 8:14.2; 9:09.4; 8:31.0; 8:01.6	2	34:09.2	
2nd place, silver medalist(s)	6; 6–1; 6–2; 6–3; 6–4	Slovenia; Aljaž Janhar; Tia Malovrh; Teja Pavec; Lovro Percl Seručnik	0:46	33:37.6; 7:51.6; 8:49.3; 8:58.7; 7:58.0	1	34:23.6	+14.4
3rd place, bronze medalist(s)	3; 3–1; 3–2; 3–3; 3–4	Italy; Bryan Venturini; Giada Delugan; Anna Senoner; Manuel Senoner	0:15	34:17.4; 7:53.8; 9:09.3; 9:39.0; 7:35.3	4	34:32.4	+23.2
4	4; 4–1; 4–2; 4–3; 4–4	Austria; David Liegl; Katharina Gruber; Clara Mentil; Andreas Gfrerer	0:23	34:21.0; 7:29.5; 9:02.7; 10:07.8; 7:41.0	5	34:44.0	+34.8
5	1; 1–1; 1–2; 1–3; 1–4	Norway; Sverre Kumar Lundeby; Nora Helene Evans; Ingrid Låte; Erik Leiråmo	0:00	35:17.8; 7:41.7; 9:58.8; 9:41.1; 7:56.2	9	35:17.8	+1:08.6
6	7; 7–1; 7–2; 7–3; 7–4	France; Lubin Martin; Romane Baud; Marion Droz Vincent; Luc Balland	0:54	34:48.3; 7:16.2; 9:47.4; 9:30.1; 8:14.6	6	35:42.3	+1:33.1
7	10; 8–1; 8–2; 8–3; 8–4	Japan; Ruka Kudo; Yuzuka Fujiwara; Jui Yamazaki; Kohtaro Kubota	1:34	34:12.1; 8:04.0; 8:50.5; 9:20.4; 7:57.2	3	35:46.1	+1:36.9
8	5; 5–1; 5–2; 5–3; 5–4	Germany; Johann Unger; Mara-Jolie Schlossarek; Sofia Eggensberger; Jonathan Gräbert	0:45	35:15.4; 7:54.6; 9:41.7; 9:55.5; 7:43.6	8	36:00.4	+1:51.2
9	8; 9–1; 9–2; 9–3; 9–4	United States; Anders Giese; Kai McKinnon; Ella Wilson; Arthur Tirone	2:43	35:07.3; 8:10.9; 9:05.1; 9:39.4; 8:11.9	7	37:50.3	+3:41.1
10	6; 10–1; 10–2; 10–3; 10–4	Czech Republic; Lukáš Doležal; Karolína Horká; Natálie Nejedlová; Jan Kabeláč	3:26	36:08.7; 7:24.3; 9:47.4; 10:59.0; 7:58.0	10	39:34.7	5:25.5
