= Kiara Morii =

Japanese snowboarder (born 2006)

Personal information
- Born: 29 September 2006 (age 19) Nagoya, Japan

Sport
- Country: Japan
- Sport: Snowboarding
- Event(s): Slopestyle, Big air
Medal record
Women's Snowboarding
Representing Japan
Junior World Championships
Bronze medal – third place	2023 Cardrona	Big Air

Kiara Morii (born 29 September 2006) is a Japanese snowboarder who competes in the slopestyle and big air events. She won a bronze medal in the Women's big air event at the 2023 Junior World Championships. She also placed fourth in the Women's big air event at the 2024 Winter Youth Olympics.
