= Lucia Georgalli =

New Zealand snowboarder (born 2007)

Personal information
- Born: 22 January 2007 (age 19) Auckland, New Zealand

Sport
- Country: New Zealand
- Sport: Snowboarding
- Event(s): Big air, Slopestyle
Medal record
Women's snowboarding
Representing New Zealand
Winter Youth Olympics
Silver medal – second place	2024 Gangwon	Slopestyle
Bronze medal – third place	2024 Gangwon	Big air
Junior World Championships
Gold medal – first place	2023 Cardrona	Slopestyle

Lucia Georgalli (born 22 January 2007) is a New Zealand snowboarder.

== Career ==
Georgalli competed at the 2023 FIS Snowboarding Junior World Championships and won a gold medal in the slopestyle event with a score of 91.00. With the win, she qualified to represent New Zealand at the 2024 Winter Youth Olympics. At the Winter Youth Olympics she won a silver medal in the slopestyle event with a score of 88.25. This was New Zealand's first medal in snowboarding at the Winter Youth Olympics. She also won a bronze medal in the big air event with a score of 152.00.

In January 2026, she was selected to represent New Zealand at the 2026 Winter Olympics.
