= Hanna Karrer =

Austrian snowboarder (born 2008)

Personal information
- Born: 6 February 2008 (age 18) Hartberg, Austria

Sport
- Country: Austria
- Sport: Snowboarding
- Events: Big air, Slopestyle
Medal record
Women's snowboarding
Representing Austria
Winter Youth Olympics
Gold medal – first place	2024 Gangwon	Slopestyle

Hanna Karrer (born 6 February 2008) is an Austrian snowboarder.

== Career ==
Karrer represented Austria at the 2024 Winter Youth Olympics and won a gold medal in the slopestyle event with a score of 89.00.

During the 2025–26 FIS Snowboard World Cup, she earned her first career World Cup podium on 6 December 2025, finishing in second place. In January 2026, she was selected to represent Austria at the 2026 Winter Olympics.
