= Yura Murase =

Japanese snowboarder (born 2007)

Yura Murase 村瀬由徠
Personal information
- Born: 1 February 2007 (age 19) Gifu, Gifu Prefecture, Japan

Sport
- Country: Japan
- Sport: Snowboarding
- Event: Big Air
Medal record
Women's snowboarding
Representing Japan
Winter Youth Olympics
| Gold medal – first place | 2024 Gangwon | Big air |

Yura Murase (村瀬 由徠, Murase Yura; born February 1, 2007) is a Japanese snowboarder who competes in the big air events. She won a gold medal in the Women's big air event at the 2024 Winter Youth Olympics.
