= Laure Mériguet =

Swiss ice hockey player (born 2008)

- Born: 15 August 2008 (age 18) Geneva, Switzerland
- Height: 1.73 m (5 ft 8 in)
- Weight: 65 kg (143 lb; 10 st 3 lb)
- Position: Defense
- Shoots: Left
- SWHL team: Lausanne HC Féminin
- National team: Switzerland
- Playing career: 2020–present
Medal record
Olympic Games
Bronze medal – third place	2026 Milano Cortina	Team

Laure Meriguet (born 15 August 2008) is a Swiss ice hockey player. She is a member of the Switzerland women's national ice hockey team that participated in women's ice hockey tournament at the 2026 Winter Olympics. She was one of 17 teenagers that played in women's ice hockey at the 2026 Winter Olympics.

== International play ==
At the 2026 IIHF U18 Women's World Championship, Meriguet was the only competing player with senior Women's Worlds experience. She has appeared in four IIHF Under-18 Women's Worlds tournaments, debuting at the 2023 event at the age of 14.

Following it up with an appearance at the 2026 Olympics, Meriguet made her Olympic debut on 6 February. In a 4–3 shootout win versus Czechia, Meriguet, wearing number 15, logged 9:34 of ice time.
