= Luke Harrold =

New Zealand freestyle skier (born 2008)

Personal information
- Born: 12 April 2008 (age 18) Christchurch, New Zealand

Sport
- Country: New Zealand
- Sport: Freestyle skiing
- Event: Halfpipe
Medal record
Men's freestyle skiing
Representing New Zealand
Winter Youth Olympics
| Gold medal – first place | 2024 Gangwon | Halfpipe |
| Bronze medal – third place | 2024 Gangwon | Big air |

Luke Harrold (born 12 April 2008) is a New Zealand freestyle skier. He represented New Zealand at the 2026 Winter Olympics.

== Career ==
Harrold represented New Zealand at the 2024 Winter Youth Olympics and won a gold medal in the halfpipe event with a score of 94.25. He became the first New Zealand skier to win an individual gold medal at any edition of the Winter Youth Olympics. His teammate, Finley Melville Ives, won silver, marking the first time there has ever been two New Zealanders on the same podium at any form of Winter Olympic Games. He also won a bronze medal in the big air event with a score of 172.25. He was subsequently named the closing ceremony flag bearer for New Zealand.

In March 2025, he competed at the 2025 FIS Freestyle Ski World Championships. He became the first skier to land a triple corked rotation in a freeski halfpipe competition, and finished in fourth place in the halfpipe event with a score of 90.75. On 30 October 2025, he was conditionally selected to represent New Zealand at the 2026 Winter Olympics.
