= Finley Melville Ives =

New Zealand freestyle skier (born 2006)

Personal information
- Born: 6 July 2006 (age 19) Dunedin, New Zealand
- Relative: Campbell Melville Ives (brother)

Sport
- Country: New Zealand
- Sport: Freestyle skiing
- Event: Halfpipe
Medal record
Men's freestyle skiing
Representing New Zealand
World Championships
| Gold medal – first place | 2025 Engadin | Halfpipe |
Winter Youth Olympics
| Silver medal – second place | 2024 Gangwon | Halfpipe |
Winter X Games
| Gold medal – first place | 2026 Aspen | Superpipe |

Finley Melville Ives (born 6 July 2006) is a New Zealand freestyle skier. He represented New Zealand at the 2026 Winter Olympics.

== Early life ==
Melville Ives was born in Dunedin and raised in Wānaka, where he was educated at Mount Aspiring College. His twin brother, Campbell, is a snowboarder.

== Career ==
Melville Ives represented New Zealand at the 2024 Winter Youth Olympics and won a silver medal in the halfpipe event with a score of 92.50. In March 2025, he competed at the 2025 FIS Freestyle Ski World Championships and won a gold medal in the halfpipe event with a score of 96.00 points.

On 30 October 2025, he was conditionally selected to represent New Zealand at the 2026 Winter Olympics. In January 2026, he competed at the Winter X Games and won a gold medal in the superpipe event with a score of 95.00.
