= Welli Hilli Park =

Ski resort in Hoengseong, South Korea

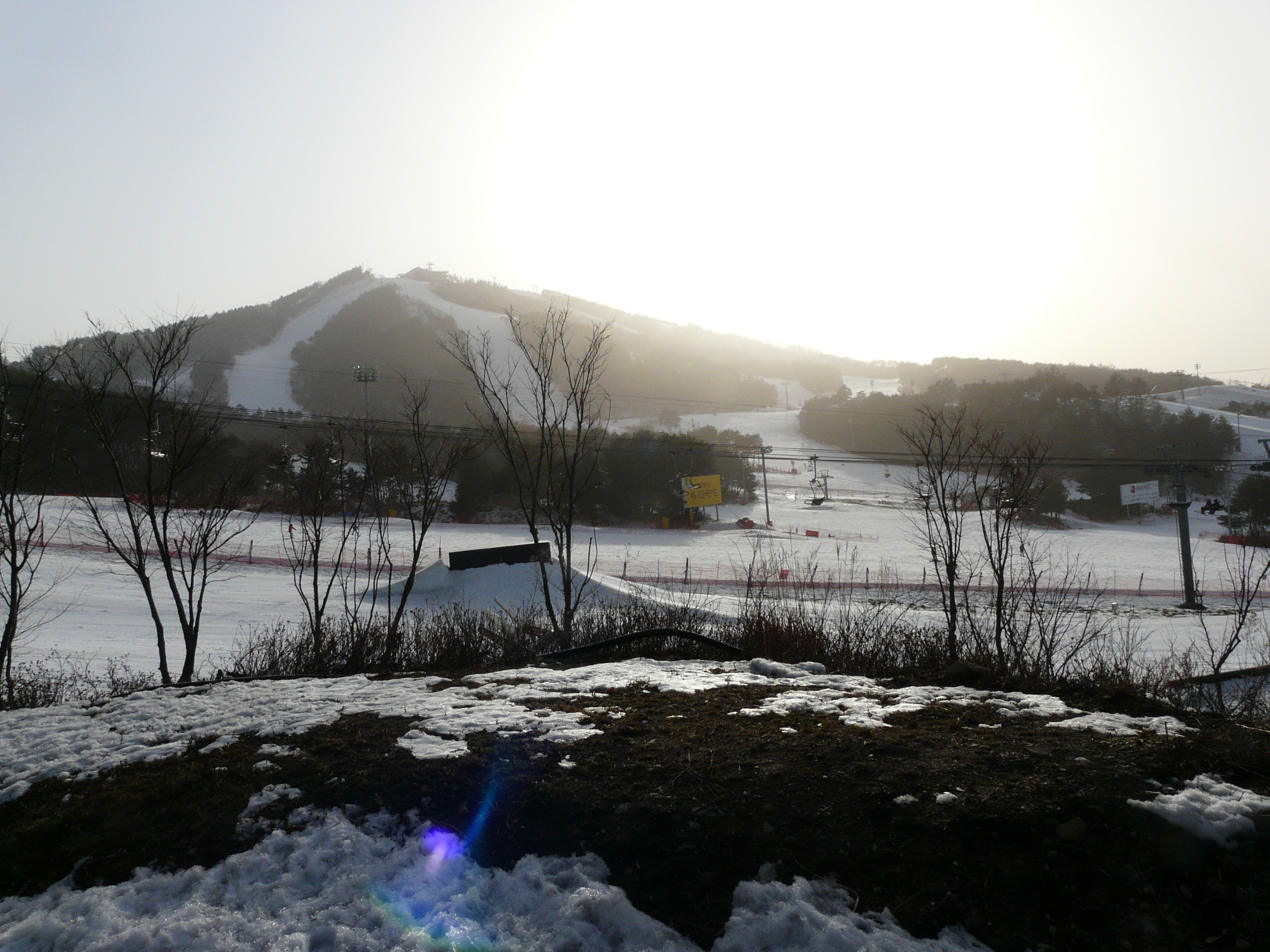

- Location within South Korea
- Location: Dunnae, Hoengseong, Gangwon, South Korea
- Coordinates: 37°29′26″N 128°15′02″E
- Vertical: 323 m (1,060 ft)
- Top elevation: 896 m (2,940 ft)
- Base elevation: 573 m (1,880 ft)
- Skiable area: 557,259 m^{2} (137.702 acres)
- Trails: 20
- Longest run: 2.6 km (1.6 mi) (Star Express)
- Total length: 12.3 km (7.6 mi)
- Lift system: 8 (including 1 gondola)
- Lift capacity: 20,416 passengers/hr
- Website: wellihillipark.com

Welli Hilli Park (Korean: 웰리힐리파크), formerly known as Hyundai Sungwoo Resort is a ski resort in Hoengseong, South Korea. The resort was opened in December 1995 by Sungwoo Group, a family company with Hyundai Group. The resort was acquired by Shinan Group in 2011 and took the current name in 2012.

The top of the resort is Suri-bong, a peak at 896 metres (2,940 ft) above sea level. The slopes are located on the north face of the peak.

In Pyeongchang's bid for the 2010 Winter Olympics, it was the venue for the sledding events (bobsleigh, luge, and skeleton) and snowboarding events. But Pyeongchang lost the bid to Vancouver.

The resort town is served by the Dunnae Station. Across the nearby Dunnae Tunnel, another ski resort, Phoenix Pyeongchang is located.

In 2018, while human athletes were competing in the 2018 Winter Olympics in Pyeongchang, nearby Welli Hilli Park hosted a skiing event for robots, competing for a $10,000 prize.

== See also ==
- List of ski areas and resorts in South Korea
