= Sweden at the 2024 Winter Youth Olympics =

- IOC code: SWE
- NOC: Swedish Olympic Committee
- Website: www.sok.se (in English and Swedish)

in Gangwon, South Korea 19 January 2024 – 1 February 2024
- Competitors: 53 in 9 sports
- Flag bearers (opening): Anton Modigs & Louise Lundquist
- Flag bearer (closing): TBD
- Medals Ranked 8th: Gold 4 Silver 4 Bronze 3 Total 11

Winter Youth Olympics appearances (overview)
- 2012; 2016; 2020; 2024

Sweden is scheduled to compete at the 2024 Winter Youth Olympics in Gangwon, South Korea, from January 19 to February 1, 2024. This will be Sweden's fourth appearance at the Winter Youth Olympic Games, having competed at every Games since the inaugural edition in 2012.

Biathlete Anton Modigs and alpine skier Louise Lundquist were the country's flagbearers during the opening ceremony.

== Competitors ==
The following is the list of number of competitors (per gender) participating at the games per sport/discipline. The team was selected on 21 December 2023.

| Sport | Men | Women | Total |
|---|---|---|---|
| Alpine skiing | 3 | 3 | 6 |
| Biathlon | 4 | 4 | 8 |
| Cross-country skiing | 2 | 2 | 4 |
| Curling | 3 | 3 | 6 |
| Figure skating | 1 | 0 | 1 |
| Freestyle skiing | 4 | 4 | 8 |
| Ice hockey | 0 | 18 | 18 |
| Luge | 0 | 1 | 1 |
| Speed skating | 0 | 1 | 1 |
| Total | 17 | 36 | 53 |

== Medalists ==
| Medal | Name | Sport | Event | Date |
|---|---|---|---|---|
| Gold | Uma Kruse Een | Freestyle skiing | Women's ski cross | 23 January |
| Gold | William Young Shing; Alexandra Nilsson | Freestyle skiing | Mixed team ski cross | 24 January |
| Gold | Elsa Tänglander | Cross-country skiing | Women's sprint | 29 January |
| Gold | Sweden women's national under-16 ice hockey team | Ice hockey | Women's tournament | 31 January |
| Silver | Alexander Ax Swartz | Alpine skiing | Men's combined | 22 January |
| Silver | Elliot Westlund | Alpine skiing | Men's slalom | 25 January |
| Silver | Astrid Hedin; Elliot Westlund | Alpine skiing | Parallel mixed team | 26 January |
| Silver | Kajsa Johansson | Cross-country skiing | Women's sprint | 29 January |
| Bronze | Liam Liljenborg | Alpine skiing | Men's combined | 22 January |
| Bronze | Astrid Hedin | Alpine skiing | Women's giant slalom | 23 January |
| Bronze | Måns Abersten | Freestyle skiing | Men's ski cross | 23 January |

== Alpine skiing ==
Sweden qualified six alpine skiers (three per gender).

Men

| Athlete | Event | Run 1 | | Run 2 | | Total | |
| Athlete | Event | Time | Rank | Time | Rank | Time | Rank |
|---|---|---|---|---|---|---|---|
| Alexander Ax Swartz | Slalom | DNF | | | | | |
| Alexander Ax Swartz | Giant slalom | DNF | | | | | |
| Alexander Ax Swartz | Super-G | —N/a | | | | 55.41 | 16 |
| Alexander Ax Swartz | Combined | 56.21 | 26 | 53.3 | 2 | 1:49.59 | 2nd place, silver medalist(s) |
| Liam Liljenborg | Slalom | 46.04 | 1 | DNF | | | |
| Liam Liljenborg | Giant slalom | 48.54 | 1 | DNF | | | |
| Liam Liljenborg | Super-G | —N/a | | | | 54.88 | 5 |
| Liam Liljenborg | Combined | 54.52 | 4 | 55.78 | 9 | 1:50.30 | 3rd place, bronze medalist(s) |
| Elliot Westlund | Slalom | 46.45 | 2 | 52.21 | 4 | 1:38.66 | 2nd place, silver medalist(s) |
| Elliot Westlund | Giant slalom | 49.21 | 3 | DSQ | | | |
| Elliot Westlund | Super-G | —N/a | | | | 54.99 | 7 |
| Elliot Westlund | Combined | 54.35 | 1 | 56.08 | 14 | 1:50.43 | 6 |

Women

| Athlete | Event | Run 1 | | Run 2 | | Total | |
| Athlete | Event | Time | Rank | Time | Rank | Time | Rank |
|---|---|---|---|---|---|---|---|
| Lina Gustafsson | Slalom | 50.92 | 10 | 49.13 | 9 | 1:40.05 | 6 |
| Lina Gustafsson | Giant slalom | DNF | | | | | |
| Lina Gustafsson | Super-G | —N/a | | | | 55.36 | 15 |
| Lina Gustafsson | Combined | 58.47 | 23 | DNF | | | |
| Astrid Hedin | Slalom | 49.69 | 2 | DNF | | | |
| Astrid Hedin | Giant slalom | 49.40 | 8 | 52.73 | 3 | 1:42.13 | 3rd place, bronze medalist(s) |
| Astrid Hedin | Super-G | —N/a | | | | 54.32 | 8 |
| Astrid Hedin | Combined | 57.62 | 14 | 51.49 | 3 | 1:49.11 | 4 |
| Louise Lundqvist | Slalom | 50.67 | 6 | 48.90 | 5 | 1:39.57 | 4 |
| Louise Lundqvist | Giant slalom | 50.32 | 15 | 53.96 | 10 | 1:44.28 | 12 |
| Louise Lundqvist | Super-G | —N/a | | | | 56.59 | 29 |
| Louise Lundqvist | Combined | 58.82 | 27 | 51.34 | 2 | 1:50.16 | 9 |

Mixed

| Athletes | Event | Round of 16 | Quarterfinals | Semifinals | Final / BM | |
| Athletes | Event | Opposition Result | Opposition Result | Opposition Result | Opposition Result | Rank |
|---|---|---|---|---|---|---|
| Astrid Hedin; Elliot Westlund | Parallel team | Great Britain; W 3–1 | France; W 2*–2 | Finland; W 4–0 | Austria; L 2–2* | 2nd place, silver medalist(s) |

== Biathlon ==
Sweden received 4 quota in each gender after finishing in the top 10 of the Nations Cup in the 2022–23 Biathlon World Cup.

Men

| Athlete | Event | Time | Misses | Rank |
|---|---|---|---|---|
| Olle Gedda | Sprint | 25:15.7 | 7 (4+3) | 63 |
| Olle Gedda | Individual | 50:02.1 | 10 (0+4+3+3) | 58 |
| Anton Modigs | Sprint | 22:32.3 | 2 (0+2) | 8 |
| Anton Modigs | Individual | 45:01.6 | 3 (1+0+0+2) | 16 |
| Thijn Omblets | Sprint | 27:27.5 | 7 (4+3) | 82 |
| Thijn Omblets | Individual | 50:11.6 | 6 (1+2+1+2) | 61 |
| Arvid Trofast | Sprint | Did not start | | |
| Arvid Trofast | Individual | 48:58.4 | 8 (0+4+2+2) | 51 |

Women

| Athlete | Event | Time | Misses | Rank |
|---|---|---|---|---|
| Anine Karlsson | Sprint | 23:30.5 | 4 (2+2) | 37 |
| Anine Karlsson | Individual | 44:54.1 | 5 (2+0+2+1) | 55 |
| Nilla Norberg Grönborg | Sprint | 25:06.7 | 7 (3+4) | 58 |
| Nilla Norberg Grönborg | Individual | 48:25.5 | 10 (3+4+2+1) | 79 |
| Maya Rennermalm | Sprint | 22:38.7 | 3 (0+3) | 29 |
| Maya Rennermalm | Individual | 44:33.3 | 3 (0+1+1+1) | 51 |
| Märta Wernersson | Sprint | 24:30.3 | 5 (0+5) | 51 |
| Märta Wernersson | Individual | 46:49.9 | 4 (2+2+0+0) | 67 |

Mixed

| Athletes | Event | Time | Misses | Rank |
|---|---|---|---|---|
| Maya Rennermalm; Anton Modigs | Single mixed relay | 49:49.0 | 2+18 | 18 |
| Maya Rennermalm; Anine Karlsson; Anton Modigs; Olle Gedda | Mixed relay | 1:22:53.3 | 4+16 | 8 |

== Cross-country skiing ==
Sweden qualified four cross-country skiers (two per gender).

Men

| Athlete | Event | Qualification | | Quarterfinal | | Semifinal | | Final | |
| Athlete | Event | Time | Rank | Time | Rank | Time | Rank | Time | Rank |
|---|---|---|---|---|---|---|---|---|---|
| Tage Börjesson | 7.5 km classic | —N/a | | | | | | 21:26.8 | 31 |
| Tage Börjesson | Sprint freestyle | 3:04.80 | 3 Q | 3:07.95 | 3 | Did not advance | | | |
| Måns Ravald | 7.5 km classic | —N/a | | | | | | 20:13.4 | 5 |
| Måns Ravald | Sprint freestyle | 3:06.52 | 8 Q | 3:07.77 | 2 Q | 3:10.15 | 4 LL | 3:27.21 | 6 |

Women

| Athlete | Event | Qualification | | Quarterfinal | | Semifinal | | Final | |
| Athlete | Event | Time | Rank | Time | Rank | Time | Rank | Time | Rank |
|---|---|---|---|---|---|---|---|---|---|
| Kajsa Johansson | 7.5 km classic | —N/a | | | | | | 23:23.4 | 17 |
| Kajsa Johansson | Sprint freestyle | 3:33.49 | 6 Q | 3:40.33 | 2 Q | 3:37.00 | 3 LL | 3:34.24 | 2nd place, silver medalist(s) |
| Elsa Tänglander | 7.5 km classic | —N/a | | | | | | 22:43.4 | 4 |
| Elsa Tänglander | Sprint freestyle | 3:27.75 | 1 Q | 3:39.15 | 1 Q | 3:38.68 | 1 Q | 3:33.98 | 1st place, gold medalist(s) |

Women

| Athletes | Event | Result | |
| Athletes | Event | Time | Rank |
|---|---|---|---|
| Tage Börjesson; Måns Ravald; Kajsa Johansson; Elsa Tänglander | 4x5 km relay | 53:13.8 | 4 |

== Curling ==
Sweden qualified a mixed team and mixed doubles pair for a total of six athletes.

Summary

| Team | Event | Group Stage | | | | | | | | Quarterfinal | Semifinal | Final / BM | |
| Team | Event | Opposition Score | Opposition Score | Opposition Score | Opposition Score | Opposition Score | Opposition Score | Opposition Score | Rank | Opposition Score | Opposition Score | Opposition Score | Rank |
|---|---|---|---|---|---|---|---|---|---|---|---|---|---|
| Vilmer Nygren; Astrid Linder; Ivan Almeling; Matilda Lindberg | Mixed team | New Zealand; W 9–3 | Norway; W 10–7 | Japan; L 2–10 | Turkey; W 8–7 | China; W 5–4 | United States; L 5–11 | Nigeria; W 16–0 | 4 | Did not advance | | | 8 |
| Maja Roxin; Jonatan Meyerson | Mixed doubles | Norway; W 7–6 | United States; L 5–6 | Slovenia; W 15–4 | Ukraine; W 9–0 | Qatar; W 13–1 | —N/a | | 2 Q | China; W 9–6 | Great Britain; L 5–6 | United States; L 4–7 | 4 |

=== Mixed team ===
| Group A | Skip | W | L | W–L | PF | PA | EW | EL | BE | SE | DSC |
|---|---|---|---|---|---|---|---|---|---|---|---|
| China | Li Zetai | 6 | 1 | 1–0 | 65 | 25 | 28 | 17 | 0 | 12 | 59.04 |
| United States | Kenna Ponzio | 6 | 1 | 0–1 | 68 | 26 | 31 | 16 | 1 | 15 | 51.38 |
| Japan | Kaito Fujii | 5 | 2 | 1–0 | 64 | 26 | 27 | 17 | 2 | 11 | 39.53 |
| Sweden | Vilmer Nygren | 5 | 2 | 0–1 | 55 | 42 | 27 | 19 | 5 | 10 | 58.05 |
| Norway | Alexander Johansen | 3 | 4 | – | 49 | 39 | 25 | 19 | 2 | 11 | 65.33 |
| Turkey | Muhammed Taha Zenit | 2 | 5 | – | 41 | 40 | 16 | 26 | 5 | 5 | 82.17 |
| New Zealand | Jed Nevill | 1 | 6 | – | 27 | 44 | 18 | 23 | 3 | 6 | 86.52 |
| Nigeria | Goodnews Charles | 0 | 7 | – | 6 | 133 | 4 | 39 | 1 | 0 | 199.60 |

Round robin

Draw 1

Saturday, January 20, 10:00

| Sheet D | 1 | 2 | 3 | 4 | 5 | 6 | 7 | 8 | Final |
| New Zealand (Nevill) | 0 | 0 | 2 | 0 | 0 | 0 | 1 | X | 3 |
| Sweden (Nygren) 🔨 | 0 | 4 | 0 | 1 | 2 | 2 | 0 | X | 9 |

Draw 2

Saturday, January 20, 18:00

| Sheet B | 1 | 2 | 3 | 4 | 5 | 6 | 7 | 8 | Final |
| Norway (Johansen) | 0 | 2 | 1 | 0 | 2 | 0 | 2 | 0 | 7 |
| Sweden (Nygren) 🔨 | 3 | 0 | 0 | 3 | 0 | 3 | 0 | 1 | 10 |

Draw 3

Sunday, January 21, 14:00

| Sheet A | 1 | 2 | 3 | 4 | 5 | 6 | 7 | 8 | Final |
| Japan (Fujii) 🔨 | 6 | 2 | 1 | 1 | 0 | 0 | X | X | 10 |
| Sweden (Nygren) | 0 | 0 | 0 | 0 | 1 | 1 | X | X | 2 |

Draw 4

Monday, January 22, 10:00

| Sheet C | 1 | 2 | 3 | 4 | 5 | 6 | 7 | 8 | 9 | Final |
| Sweden (Nygren) 🔨 | 2 | 0 | 3 | 1 | 0 | 0 | 1 | 0 | 1 | 8 |
| Turkey (Zenit) | 0 | 1 | 0 | 0 | 3 | 0 | 0 | 3 | 0 | 7 |

Draw 5

Monday, January 22, 18:00

| Sheet A | 1 | 2 | 3 | 4 | 5 | 6 | 7 | 8 | Final |
| Sweden (Nygren) 🔨 | 0 | 2 | 0 | 0 | 0 | 0 | 0 | 3 | 5 |
| China (Li) | 0 | 0 | 2 | 0 | 0 | 1 | 1 | 0 | 4 |

Draw 6

Tuesday, January 23, 14:00

| Sheet C | 1 | 2 | 3 | 4 | 5 | 6 | 7 | 8 | Final |
| United States (Ponzio) | 0 | 4 | 5 | 0 | 2 | 0 | X | X | 11 |
| Sweden (Nygren) 🔨 | 2 | 0 | 0 | 2 | 0 | 1 | X | X | 5 |

Draw 7

Wednesday, January 24, 9:00

| Sheet D | 1 | 2 | 3 | 4 | 5 | 6 | 7 | 8 | Final |
| Sweden (Nygren) 🔨 | 3 | 2 | 3 | 3 | 1 | 2 | 2 | X | 16 |
| Nigeria (Charles) | 0 | 0 | 0 | 0 | 0 | 0 | 0 | X | 0 |

=== Mixed doubles ===
| Group B | W | L | W–L | DSC |
|---|---|---|---|---|
| United States | 5 | 0 | – | 61.18 |
| Sweden | 4 | 1 | – | 78.69 |
| Norway | 3 | 2 | – | 34.37 |
| Slovenia | 2 | 3 | – | 112.84 |
| Ukraine | 1 | 4 | – | 74.81 |
| Qatar | 0 | 5 | – | 155.39 |

Round robin

Draw 1

Friday, January 26, 18:00

| Sheet B | 1 | 2 | 3 | 4 | 5 | 6 | 7 | 8 | Final |
| Sweden (Roxin / Meyerson) | 0 | 0 | 0 | 1 | 4 | 1 | 0 | 1 | 7 |
| Norway (Hausstaetter / Svorkmo Lundberg) 🔨 | 1 | 1 | 1 | 0 | 0 | 0 | 3 | 0 | 6 |

Draw 3

Saturday, January 27, 14:00

| Sheet C | 1 | 2 | 3 | 4 | 5 | 6 | 7 | 8 | Final |
| United States (Wendling / Paral) 🔨 | 1 | 1 | 1 | 0 | 0 | 2 | 0 | 1 | 6 |
| Sweden (Roxin / Meyerson) | 0 | 0 | 0 | 2 | 1 | 0 | 2 | 0 | 5 |

Draw 7

Sunday, January 28, 18:00

| Sheet D | 1 | 2 | 3 | 4 | 5 | 6 | 7 | 8 | Final |
| Sweden (Roxin / Meyerson) 🔨 | 0 | 4 | 0 | 4 | 2 | 2 | 3 | X | 15 |
| Slovenia (Kavčič / Omerzel) | 1 | 0 | 3 | 0 | 0 | 0 | 0 | X | 4 |

Draw 10

Monday, January 29, 18:00

| Sheet A | 1 | 2 | 3 | 4 | 5 | 6 | 7 | 8 | Final |
| Sweden (Roxin / Meyerson) 🔨 | 1 | 1 | 2 | 3 | 1 | 1 | X | X | 9 |
| Ukraine (Lytvynenko / Shlyk) | 0 | 0 | 0 | 0 | 0 | 0 | X | X | 0 |

Draw 12

Tuesday, January 30, 14:00

| Sheet B | 1 | 2 | 3 | 4 | 5 | 6 | 7 | 8 | Final |
| Qatar (Al-Fahad / Alnaimi) | 0 | 0 | 0 | 1 | 0 | 0 | X | X | 1 |
| Sweden (Roxin / Meyerson) 🔨 | 2 | 2 | 2 | 0 | 3 | 4 | X | X | 13 |

Quarterfinal

Wednesday, January 31, 19:00

| Sheet A | 1 | 2 | 3 | 4 | 5 | 6 | 7 | 8 | Final |
| China (Gong / Xu) | 0 | 2 | 0 | 0 | 1 | 0 | 3 | 0 | 6 |
| Sweden (Roxin / Meyerson) 🔨 | 4 | 0 | 1 | 1 | 0 | 2 | 0 | 1 | 9 |

Semifinal

Thursday, February 1, 9:00

| Sheet C | 1 | 2 | 3 | 4 | 5 | 6 | 7 | 8 | Final |
| Great Britain (Soutar / Brewster) | 1 | 1 | 1 | 0 | 0 | 2 | 0 | 1 | 6 |
| Sweden (Roxin / Meyerson) 🔨 | 0 | 0 | 0 | 2 | 1 | 0 | 2 | 0 | 5 |

Bronze medal game

Thursday, February 1, 13:00

| Sheet B | 1 | 2 | 3 | 4 | 5 | 6 | 7 | 8 | 9 | Final |
| Sweden (Roxin / Meyerson) 🔨 | 1 | 0 | 1 | 1 | 1 | 0 | 0 | 0 | 0 | 4 |
| United States (Wendling / Paral) | 0 | 1 | 0 | 0 | 0 | 1 | 1 | 1 | 3 | 7 |

== Figure skating ==
Sweden qualified one athlete via the 2023 World Junior Championships.

| Athletes | Event | SP/SD | | FS/FD | | Total | |
| Athletes | Event | Points | Rank | Points | Rank | Points | Rank |
|---|---|---|---|---|---|---|---|
| Elias Sayed | Men's singles | 54.57 | 15 | 95.57 | 16 | 150.14 | 16 |

== Freestyle skiing ==
Sweden received a totalt of eight quotas in freestyle skiing.

Dual moguls
Individual

| Athlete | Event | Group Stage | | | | | | Semifinals | Final / BM | |
| Athlete | Event | Opposition Result | Opposition Result | Opposition Result | Opposition Result | Points | Rank | Opposition Result | Opposition Result | Rank |
|---|---|---|---|---|---|---|---|---|---|---|
| Noel Gravenfors | Men's dual moguls | Huff (USA); L 2–3 | Long (CHN); L 2–3 | Lampi (FIN); L 2–3 | Gianella (SUI); W 3–1 | 9 | 4 | Did not advance | | |
| Elis Moberg | Men's dual moguls | Cohen (USA); L 2–3 | Gay (FRA); W 3–2 | Zvalený (CZE); W 3–2 | Verdaguer Forn (ESP); W 3–1 | 11 | 2 | Did not advance | | |
| Olivia Hedberg | Women's dual moguls | Nilsson (SWE); W 3–2 | Yun (KOR); W 3–2 | Lemley (USA); L 2–3 | Lamontagne (CAN); W 3–2 | 11 | 2 | Did not advance | | |
| Nova Nilsson | Women's dual moguls | Hedberg (SWE); L 2–3 | Lamontagne (CAN); L 2–3 | Lemley (USA); L 2–3 | Yun (KOR); L 2–3 | 8 | 5 | Did not advance | | |

Team

| Athlete | Event | Round of 16 | Quarterfinals | Semifinals | Final / BM | |
| Athlete | Event | Opposition Result | Opposition Result | Opposition Result | Opposition Result | Rank |
|---|---|---|---|---|---|---|
| Olivia Hedberg; Elis Moberg | Mixed team | Boychuk / Sauvageau (CAN); L 31–39 | Did not advance | | | |
| Nova Nilsson; Noel Gravenfors | Mixed team | Sakai / Nakamura (JPN); L 28–42 | Did not advance | | | |

Ski cross
Individual

| Athlete | Event | Group heats | | Semifinal | Final |
| Athlete | Event | Points | Rank | Position | Position |
|---|---|---|---|---|---|
| Måns Abersten | Men's ski cross | 20 | 1 Q | 2 BF | 3rd place, bronze medalist(s) |
| William Young Shing | Men's ski cross | 18 | 2 Q | 3 SF | 5 |
| Uma Kruse Een | Women's ski cross | 20 | 1 Q | 1 BF | 1st place, gold medalist(s) |
| Alexandra Nilsson | Women's ski cross | 19 | 2 Q | 3 SF | 5 |

Team

| Athlete | Event | Pre-heats | Quarterfinal | Semifinal | Final |
| Athlete | Event | Position | Position | Position | Position |
|---|---|---|---|---|---|
| Måns Abersten; Uma Kruse Een | Team ski cross | —N/a | 1 Q | 4 SF | Did not start |
| William Young Shing; Alexandra Nilsson | Team ski cross | —N/a | 2 Q | 1 BF | 1st place, gold medalist(s) |

== Ice hockey ==
Sweden qualified a team of eighteen ice hockey players for the women's six-team tournament.

Roster

Morgan Johansson served as head coach. His coaching staff comprised assistant coach Martin Lindh and goalkeeper coach Emil Karnatz.

- Judith Andersson (F)
- Chloe Berndtsson (D)
- Disa Carlsson (F)
- Maja Engelin (G)
- Tilde Grillfors (F)
- Selma Karlsson (D)
- Malva Lindgren (D) – A
- Elin Löwenadler (G)
- Ida Melin (F) – C
- Vilda Nordh (D)
- Nellie Norén (F)
- Nora Segerljung Svanefjord (F)
- Alva Vitalisson (D)
- Tillie Ytfeldt (F) – A
- Ebba Westerlind (D)
- Tilde Wyckman (G)
- Maja Åkerlund (F)
- Matilda Österman (F)

Summary

Key:

- GWS – Game winning shots
- Q – Qualified

| Team | Event | Group stage | | | Semifinal | Final | |
| Team | Event | Opponent Score | Opponent Score | Rank | Opponent Score | Opponent Score | Rank |
|---|---|---|---|---|---|---|---|
| Sweden | Women's tournament | Norway; W 5–1 | Japan; W 2–1 GWS | Q | Germany; W 6–1 | Japan; W 4–0 | 1st place, gold medalist(s) |

=== Women's tournament ===
Preliminary round, Group A

| Pos | Team | Pld | W | SOW | SOL | L | GF | GA | GD | Pts | Qualification |
|---|---|---|---|---|---|---|---|---|---|---|---|
| 1 | Sweden | 2 | 1 | 1 | 0 | 0 | 7 | 2 | +5 | 5 | Semifinals |
| 2 | Japan | 2 | 1 | 0 | 1 | 0 | 6 | 3 | +3 | 4 | Semifinals |
| 3 | Norway | 2 | 0 | 0 | 0 | 2 | 2 | 10 | −8 | 0 | |

Source: IOC

| 27 January 2024; 11:00 | Norway | 1–5 (0–1, 0–1, 1–3) | Sweden | Gangneung Hockey Centre; Attendance: 2,061 |

Game reference

Tuva Are-Ekstrøm
Goalies
Tilde Wyckman
Referees:
(China) Ding Siwen
(United States) Maria Gherardi
Linesmen:
(Germany) Lara Fischer
(Ukraine) Anhelina Maifeld

| | 0–1 | 13:07 – Ytfeldt (Westerlind) (PP) |
| | 0–2 | 15:48 – Westerlind (Grillfors) |
| | 0–3 | 33:03 – Grillfors (Andersson, Westerlind) |
| | 0–4 | 34:23 – Österman (Carlsson, Berndtsson) |
| Bax-Kristiansen (Helle, M. Are-Ekstrøm) (PP) – 37:53 | 1–4 |
| | 1–5 | 39:23 – Svanefjord (Ytfeldt, Österman) (PP) |

6 min
Penalties
4.5 min
12
Shots
35

| 29 January 2024; 11:00 | Sweden | 2–1 GWS (0–0, 0–0, 1–1) (SO: 1–0) | Japan | Gangneung Hockey Centre; Attendance: 1,503 |

Game reference
| Tilde Wyckman | Goalies | Rio Suzuki | Referees: (Mexico) María Chávez (United States) Maria Gherardi; Linesmen: (Germany) Lara Fischer (Finland) Ilona Silander |
| / 0–1 / 35:07 – Odaira (Yamaguchi, Numabe); Svanefjord (Österman) – 37:18 / 1–1 | | | Referees: (Mexico) María Chávez (United States) Maria Gherardi; Linesmen: (Germany) Lara Fischer (Finland) Ilona Silander |
| Österman; Westerlind | Shootout | (miss) Odaira; (miss) Numabe | Referees: (Mexico) María Chávez (United States) Maria Gherardi; Linesmen: (Germany) Lara Fischer (Finland) Ilona Silander |
| 3 min | Penalties | 1.5 min | Referees: (Mexico) María Chávez (United States) Maria Gherardi; Linesmen: (Germany) Lara Fischer (Finland) Ilona Silander |
| 21 | Shots | 18 | Referees: (Mexico) María Chávez (United States) Maria Gherardi; Linesmen: (Germany) Lara Fischer (Finland) Ilona Silander |

Semifinals

| 30 January 2024; 11:00 | Sweden | 6–1 (1–0, 3–0, 2–1) | Germany | Gangneung Hockey Centre; Attendance: 1,380 |

Game reference

Tilde Wyckman
Goalies
Hanna Bugl
Milana Lutz
Referees:
(United States) Maria Gherardi
(Malaysia) Wan Mei Wah
Linesmen:
(United States) Laura Schmidlein
(Finland) Ilona Silander

| Vitalisson (Svanefjord, Westerlind) – 08:52 | 1–0 |
| Grillfors (Ytfeldt, Österman) – 16:37 | 2–0 |
| Svanefjord (Westerlind, Grillfors) – 18:05 | 3–0 |
| Lindgren – 28:27 | 4–0 |
| Grillfors – 33:15 | 5–0 |
| Carlsson (Berndtsson, Lindgren) – 34:41 | 6–0 |
| | 6–1 | 43:26 – Pfalz (Seyrer) (PP) |

1.5 min
Penalties
3 min
40
Shots
12

Finals

| 31 January 2024; 16:00 | Sweden | 4–0 (2–0, 0–0, 2–0) | Japan | Gangneung Hockey Centre; Attendance: 2,880 |

Game reference

Tilde Wyckman
Goalies
Suzuno Fukuda
Referees:
(Canada) Beatrice Fortin
(United States) Maria Gherardi
Linesmen:
(Ukraine) Anhelina Maifeld
(United States) Laura Schmidlein

| Grillfors – 09:02 | 1–0 |
| Westerlind – 11:06 | 2–0 |
| Norén (Carlsson, Melin) – 31:00 | 3–0 |
| Österman (ENG) – 44:26 | 4–0 |

6 min
Penalties
0 min
14
Shots
27

== Luge ==
Sweden qualified one athlete

Women

| Athlete | Event | Run 1 | | Run 2 | | Total | |
| Athlete | Event | Time | Rank | Time | Rank | Time | Rank |
|---|---|---|---|---|---|---|---|
| Johanna Kohala | Singles | 50.393 | 24 | 49.907 | 19 | 1:40.300 | 20 |

== Speed skating ==
Sweden received one female quota via the 2023–24 ISU Junior World Cup standings.

Women

| Athlete | Event | Time | Rank |
|---|---|---|---|
| Josephine Grill | 500 m | 45.84 | 32 |
| Josephine Grill | 1500 m | 2:26.24 | 32 |
| Josephine Grill | Mass start | 6:02.68 | 22 |
