= Ice hockey at the 2024 Winter Youth Olympics – Women's tournament =

2024 Winter Youth Olympics women's ice hockey tournament
Tournament details
- Host country: South Korea
- Venue: 1 (in 1 host city)
- Dates: 27–31 January
- Teams: 6

Final positions
- Champions: Sweden (3rd title)
- Runners-up: Japan
- Third place: Germany
- Fourth place: Switzerland

Tournament statistics
- Games played: 10
- Goals scored: 42 (4.2 per game)
- Attendance: 19,007 (1,901 per game)
- Scoring leader(s): (Japan) Azumi Numabe (Japan) Umeka Odaira (7 points)

The women's ice hockey tournament was one of four under-16 (U16) ice hockey events contested as part of the 2024 Winter Youth Olympics in Gangneung, South Korea. The tournament was held from 27 to 31 January at the Gangneung Hockey Centre.

France, Germany, Japan, Norway, Sweden, and Switzerland were each represented by a team of eighteen players born in 2008 or 2009.

== Officials ==
Ten on-ice officials were selected for the tournament.

Referees

- (Mexico) María Chávez
- (China) Ding Siwen
- (Canada) Beatrice Fortin
- (United States) Maria Gherardi
- (Malaysia) Mei Wah Wan

Linesmen

- (Germany) Lara Fischer
- (Ukraine) Anhelina Maifeld
- (Switzerland) Domenica Maurer
- (United States) Laura Schmidlein
- (Finland) Ilona Silander

International Ice Hockey Federation representative Zsuzsanna Kolbenheyer of Hungary was the tournament chairperson. Chinese speed skater and 2014 Olympic gold medalist Zhang Hong was the medal presenter at the victory ceremony.

== Teams ==
France	Goaltenders: Alice Chevrier, Louna Ivaldy, Lysa Nogaretto; Defensemen: Chloé Bened, Camille Cunin-Hogly, Manon Demessine (A), Louison Pastre, Domitille Ratto, Maud Tessier Maniere; Forwards: Clémence Boudin (C), Isabella De Gaulmyn, Emy Denis, Agathe Eitenschenck, Victoria Falco, Maëli Moussier, Jeanne Paul-Constant, Maéli Raigneau, Maeva Sadoun (A); Head coach: Marion Allemoz; Assistant coaches: Sébastien Roujon, Alisson Obré, Christophe Renard
Germany	Goaltenders: Tara Bach, Hanna Bugl, Milana Lutz; Defensemen: Emilija Birka, Sarah Bouceka, Victoria Gmeiner, Caylee Nagle, Lena Spagert; Forwards: Lina Alberts, Mathilda Heine, Sandra Mayr, Friederike Pfalz (A), Charleen Poindl, Madalena Seidel, Anabel Seyrer, Hanna Weichenhain (A), Zoe Wintgen, Theresa Zielinski (C); Head coach: Christoph Hoehenleitner; Assistant coach: Jennifer Harß
Japan	Goaltenders: Suzuno Fukuda, Yumin Furuhira, Rio Suzuki; Defensemen: Mayu Hosogoe, Riko Nishiuchi, Koko Ruike, Lily Sato, Rino Tada (A), Kika Terauchi (C); Forwards: Nana Akimoto, Momona Fukuzawa, Tsumugi Ito, Reina Kakuta, Saika Kiyokawa, Azumi Numabe, Umeka Odaira, Momoka Okamura, Nanaho Yamaguchi (A); Head coach: Haruna Yoneyama; Assistant coach: Moeko Fujimoto
Norway	Goaltenders: Tuva Are-Ekstrøm, Hanna Engløkk, Shiva Nobari; Defensemen: Mille Are-Ekstrøm (A), Mari Kristiansen (C), Thilde Lillenes-Taftø, Maja Raknes, Tyra Sawyer (A); Forwards: Cornelia Bax-Kristiansen, Jenny Bekken, Pia Helle, Eneah Holm, Vilde Jolma-Stansland, Ragnhild Klomstad, Fiona Larsen, Julie Rosenlund, Timea Scurkova, Elvira Stavnes; Head coach: Isaac Palmgren; Assistant coaches: Max Pettersson, Camilla Bakkene, Mia Christina Isdahl
Sweden	Goaltenders: Maja Engelin, Elin Löwenadler, Tilde Wyckman; Defensemen: Chloe Berndtsson, Selma Karlsson, Malva Lindgren (A), Vilda Nordh, Alva Vitalisson, Ebba Westerlind; Forwards: Judith Andersson, Disa Carlsson, Tilde Grillfors, Ida Melin (C), Nellie Norén, Nova Svanefjord, Tillie Ytfeldt (A), Maja Åkerlund, Matilda Österman; Head coach: Morgan Johansson; Assistant coaches: Martin Lindh, Emil Karnatz
Switzerland	Goaltenders: Valentina Camenzind, Anne-Eugénie Gendre, Norina Schrupkowski; Defensemen: Miriana Bottoni, Mila Croll, Laure Mériguet, Shayna Merkofer, Sarina Messikommer, Anaïs Rohner; Forwards: Jil Baker (A), Lorie-Lou Besson, Luana Birstiel, Hannah Estermann, Alicia Fausch, Norina Müller (C), Maëlle Rohner, Livia Tschannen (A), Marlen Wälti; Head coach: Celine Abgottspon; Assistant coaches: Melanie Häfliger, Iris Müller, Andreas Ellenberger

== Preliminary round ==
All times are local (UTC+9).

=== Group A ===
Pos	Team	Pld	W	SOW	SOL	L	GF	GA	GD	Pts	Qualification
1	Sweden	2	1	1	0	0	7	2	+5	5	Semifinals
2	Japan	2	1	0	1	0	6	3	+3	4	Semifinals
3	Norway	2	0	0	0	2	2	10	−8	0	

Source: IOC

27 January 2024; 11:00	Norway	1–5 (0–1, 0–1, 1–3)	Sweden	Gangneung Hockey Centre; Attendance: 2,061

Game reference

Tuva Are-Ekstrøm
Goalies
Tilde Wyckman
Referees:
(China) Ding Siwen
(United States) Maria Gherardi
Linesmen:
(Germany) Lara Fischer
(Ukraine) Anhelina Maifeld

	0–1	13:07 – Ytfeldt (Westerlind) (PP)
	0–2	15:48 – Westerlind (Grillfors)
	0–3	33:03 – Grillfors (Andersson, Westerlind)
	0–4	34:23 – Österman (Carlsson, Berndtsson)
Bax-Kristiansen (Helle, M. Are-Ekstrøm) (PP) – 37:53	1–4
	1–5	39:23 – Svanefjord (Ytfeldt, Österman) (PP)

6 min
Penalties
4.5 min
12
Shots
35

28 January 2024; 11:00	Japan	5–1 (1–0, 0–0, 4–1)	Norway	Gangneung Hockey Centre; Attendance: 2,837

Game reference

Suzuno Fukuda
Goalies
Shiva Nobari
Referees:
(China) Ding Siwen
(Canada) Beatrice Fortin
Linesmen:
(United States) Laura Schmidlein
(Finland) Ilona Silander

Terauchi (Odaira, Numabe) (PP) – 10:47	1–0
Numabe (Odaira, Terauchi) – 30:41	2–0
	2–1	33:25 – Helle, (Klomstad, Bax-Kristiansen) (PP)
Odaira (Numabe, Terauchi) – 36:17	3–1
Numabe (Terauchi, Odaira) – 40:12	4–1
Odaira (Numabe) – 43:04	5–1

6 min
Penalties
6 min
41
Shots
13

29 January 2024; 11:00	Sweden	2–1 GWS (0–0, 0–0, 1–1) (SO: 1–0)	Japan	Gangneung Hockey Centre; Attendance: 1,503

Game reference
Tilde Wyckman	Goalies	Rio Suzuki	Referees: (Mexico) María Chávez (United States) Maria Gherardi; Linesmen: (Germany) Lara Fischer (Finland) Ilona Silander
/ 0–1 / 35:07 – Odaira (Yamaguchi, Numabe); Svanefjord (Österman) – 37:18 / 1–1			Referees: (Mexico) María Chávez (United States) Maria Gherardi; Linesmen: (Germany) Lara Fischer (Finland) Ilona Silander
Österman; Westerlind	Shootout	(miss) Odaira; (miss) Numabe	Referees: (Mexico) María Chávez (United States) Maria Gherardi; Linesmen: (Germany) Lara Fischer (Finland) Ilona Silander
3 min	Penalties	1.5 min	Referees: (Mexico) María Chávez (United States) Maria Gherardi; Linesmen: (Germany) Lara Fischer (Finland) Ilona Silander
21	Shots	18	Referees: (Mexico) María Chávez (United States) Maria Gherardi; Linesmen: (Germany) Lara Fischer (Finland) Ilona Silander

=== Group B ===
Pos	Team	Pld	W	SOW	SOL	L	GF	GA	GD	Pts	Qualification
1	Switzerland	2	2	0	0	0	4	1	+3	6	Semifinals
2	Germany	2	1	0	0	1	5	2	+3	3	Semifinals
3	France	2	0	0	0	2	0	6	−6	0	

Source: IOC

27 January 2024; 17:00	France	0–2 (0–1, 0–0, 0–1)	Switzerland	Gangneung Hockey Centre; Attendance: 1,742

Game reference
Louna Ivaldy	Goalies	Valentina Camenzind	Referees: (Mexico) María Chávez (Canada) Beatrice Fortin; Linesmen: (Switzerland) Domenica Maurer (United States) Laura Schmidlein
0–1 / 13:20 – Tschannen (SH); 0–2 / 36:43 – Müller			Referees: (Mexico) María Chávez (Canada) Beatrice Fortin; Linesmen: (Switzerland) Domenica Maurer (United States) Laura Schmidlein
3 min	Penalties	3 min	Referees: (Mexico) María Chávez (Canada) Beatrice Fortin; Linesmen: (Switzerland) Domenica Maurer (United States) Laura Schmidlein
13	Shots	29	Referees: (Mexico) María Chávez (Canada) Beatrice Fortin; Linesmen: (Switzerland) Domenica Maurer (United States) Laura Schmidlein

28 January 2024; 17:00	Germany	4–0 (1–0, 3–0, 0–0)	France	Gangneung Hockey Centre; Attendance: 1,391

Game reference

Hanna Bugl
Goalies
Louna Ivaldy
Lysa Nogaretto
Referees:
(United States) Maria Gherardi
(Malaysia) Wan Mei Wah
Linesmen:
(Germany) Lara Fischer
(Switzerland) Domenica Maurer

Wintgen – 13:00	1–0
Weichenhain (Birka) – 18:54	2–0
Heine (Pfalz, Poindl) – 26:37	3–0
Mayr (Wintgen, Weichenhain) – 29:44	4–0

1.5 min
Penalties
7.5 min
32
Shots
15

29 January 2024; 17:00	Switzerland	2–1 (0–0, 1–0, 1–1)	Germany	Gangneung Hockey Centre; Attendance: 2,219

Game reference

Norina Schrupkowski
Goalies
Tara Bach
Referees:
(China) Ding Siwen
(Malaysia) Wan Mei Wah
Linesmen:
(Ukraine) Anhelina Maifeld
(Switzerland) Domenica Maurer

Tschannen (Birnstiel) – 23:49	1–0
Rohner (Wälti) – 36:06	2–0
	2–1	41:38 – Wintgen

4.5 min
Penalties
4.5 min
19
Shots
19

== Playoff round ==
Semifinals
30 January
Sweden	6
Germany	1
30 January
Switzerland	1
Japan	2

Final
31 January
Sweden	4
Japan	0
Third place
31 January
Switzerland	1
Germany	3

=== Semifinals ===
30 January 2024; 11:00	Sweden	6–1 (1–0, 3–0, 2–1)	Germany	Gangneung Hockey Centre; Attendance: 1,380

Game reference

Tilde Wyckman
Goalies
Hanna Bugl
Milana Lutz
Referees:
(United States) Maria Gherardi
(Malaysia) Wan Mei Wah
Linesmen:
(United States) Laura Schmidlein
(Finland) Ilona Silander

Vitalisson (Svanefjord, Westerlind) – 08:52	1–0
Grillfors (Ytfeldt, Österman) – 16:37	2–0
Svanefjord (Westerlind, Grillfors) – 18:05	3–0
Lindgren – 28:27	4–0
Grillfors – 33:15	5–0
Carlsson (Berndtsson, Lindgren) – 34:41	6–0
	6–1	43:26 – Pfalz (Seyrer) (PP)

1.5 min
Penalties
3 min
40
Shots
12

30 January 2024; 17:00	Switzerland	1–2 (1–1, 0–1, 0–0)	Japan	Gangneung Hockey Centre; Attendance: 1,083

Game reference

Valentina Camenzind
Goalies
Suzuno Fukuda
Referees:
(Mexico) María Chávez
(Canada) Beatrice Fortin
Linesmen:
(Ukraine) Anhelina Maifeld
(Switzerland) Domenica Maurer

Müller – 10:06	1–0
	1–1	10:38 – Fukuzawa (Ruike)
	1–2	24:26 – Numabe (Odaira, Tada) (PP)

7.5 min
Penalties
1.5 min
12
Shots
20

=== Bronze medal game ===
31 January 2024; 10:00	Switzerland	1–3 (0–2, 1–0, 0–1)	Germany	Gangneung Hockey Centre; Attendance: 1,911

Game reference

Valentina Camenzind
Norina Schrupkowski
Goalies
Tara Bach
Referees:
(Mexico) María Chávez
(Malaysia) Wan Mei Wah
Linesmen:
(Germany) Lara Fischer
(Switzerland) Domenica Maurer

	0–1	03:32 – Birka (Seyrer)
	0–2	04:20 – Zielinski (Seyrer, Birka) (PP)
Tschannen (Mériguet) – 21:56	1–2
	1–3	44:32 – Weichenhain (ENG)

6 min
Penalties
3 min
24
Shots
26

=== Gold medal game ===
31 January 2024; 16:00	Sweden	4–0 (2–0, 0–0, 2–0)	Japan	Gangneung Hockey Centre; Attendance: 2,880

Game reference

Tilde Wyckman
Goalies
Suzuno Fukuda
Referees:
(Canada) Beatrice Fortin
(United States) Maria Gherardi
Linesmen:
(Ukraine) Anhelina Maifeld
(United States) Laura Schmidlein

Grillfors – 09:02	1–0
Westerlind – 11:06	2–0
Norén (Carlsson, Melin) – 31:00	3–0
Österman (ENG) – 44:26	4–0

6 min
Penalties
0 min
14
Shots
27

== Final ranking ==
Pos	Grp	Team	Pld	W	SOW	SOL	L	GF	GA	GD	Pts	Final result
1	A	Sweden	4	3	1	0	0	17	3	+14	11	Gold medal
2	A	Japan	4	2	0	1	1	8	8	0	7	Silver medal
3	B	Germany	4	2	0	0	2	9	9	0	6	Bronze medal
4	B	Switzerland	4	2	0	0	2	6	6	0	6	Fourth place
5	B	France	2	0	0	0	2	0	6	−6	0	
6	A	Norway	2	0	0	0	2	2	10	−8	0	

Source: IOC

== Statistics ==
=== Scoring leaders ===
	Player	GP	G	A	Pts	PIM
(Japan)	Azumi Numabe	4	3	4	7	0
(Japan)	Umeka Odaira	4	3	4	7	3
(Sweden)	Tilde Grillfors	4	4	2	6	0
(Sweden)	Ebba Westerlind	4	2	4	6	0
(Sweden)	Matilda Österman	4	2	3	5	0
(Sweden)	Nova Svanefjord	4	3	1	4	0
(Japan)	Kika Terauchi	4	1	3	4	0
(Switzerland)	Livia Tschannen	4	3	0	3	0
(Germany)	Hanna Weichenhain	4	2	1	3	0
(Germany)	Zoe Wintgen	4	2	1	3	1.5

Forwards Cornelia Bax-Kristiansen and Pia Helle were the leading scorers for Norway. Both players recorded one goal and one assist for two points in two games played and were tied for sixteenth place on the tournament scoring table.

No goals were scored for France across two games played. Forward Clémence Boudin led the team in shots on goal, with nine.

=== Goaltenders ===
Only goaltenders playing at least one-fourth of their team's minutes are included, sorted by save percentage.

	Player	GPI	MIP	W	L	SOG	GA	SO	SVS%	GAA
(Switzerland)	Norina Schrupkowski	2	84:50	1	0	39	1	0	97.44	1.92
(Sweden)	Tilde Wyckman	4	180:00	3	0	69	3	1	95.65	0.75
(Japan)	Rio Suzuki	1	45:00	0	0	20	1	0	95.00	1.00
(Germany)	Tara Bach	2	89:46	1	1	43	3	0	93.02	1.50
(Germany)	Hanna Bugl	2	75:00	1	1	42	4	1	90.48	2.40
(Switzerland)	Valentina Camenzind	3	93:31	1	2	38	4	1	89.47	1.92
(France)	Louna Ivaldy	2	74:11	0	2	52	6	0	88.46	3.64
(Norway)	Shiva Nobari	1	45:00	0	1	41	5	0	87.80	5.00
(Japan)	Suzuno Fukuda	3	134:21	2	1	38	5	0	86.84	1.67
(Norway)	Tuva Are-Ekstrøm	1	45:00	0	1	35	5	0	85.71	5.00
