= Chile at the 2024 Winter Youth Olympics =

- Flag of Chile
- IOC code: CHI
- NOC: Chilean Olympic Committee

in Gangwon, South Korea 19 January 2024 – 1 February 2024
- Competitors: 12 in 5 sports
- Flag bearers (opening): Gerónimo Castro & Aymara Viel
- Flag bearer (closing): TBD
- Medals: Gold 0 Silver 0 Bronze 0 Total 0

Winter Youth Olympics appearances
- 2012; 2016; 2020; 2024

Chile is scheduled to compete at the 2024 Winter Youth Olympics in Gangwon, South Korea, from January 19 to February 1, 2024. This will be Chile's fourth appearance at the Winter Youth Olympic Games, having competed at every Games since the inaugural edition in 2012.

The Chilean team consisted of 12 athletes (seven men and five women) competing in 5 sports, the largest ever amount of athletes it has sent to the one edition of the Winter Youth Olympic Games. Alpine skier Gerónimo Castro and freestyle skier Aymara Viel were the country's flagbearers during the opening ceremony.

== Competitors ==
The following is the list of number of competitors (per gender) participating at the games per sport/discipline.

Sport	Men	Women	Total
Alpine skiing	1	2	3
Biathlon	0	1	1
Cross-country skiing	2	0	2
Freestyle skiing	3	2	5
Snowboarding	1	0	1
Total	7	5	12

== Alpine skiing ==
Chile qualified three alpine skiers (one man and two woman).

Athlete	Event	Run 1		Run 2		Total	
Athlete	Event	Time	Rank	Time	Rank	Time	Rank
Gerónimo Castro	Men's giant slalom	DNF					
Gerónimo Castro	Men's slalom	49.74	27	56.19	20	1:45.93	18
Florencia Aramburo	Women's super-G	—N/a				DNF	
Florencia Aramburo	Women's giant slalom	52.18	24	56.23	22	1:48.41	19
Florencia Aramburo	Women's slalom	55.53	36	DNF			
Florencia Aramburo	Women's combined	DNF					
Matilde Pinilla	Women's super-G	—N/a				1:00.25	39
Matilde Pinilla	Women's giant slalom	52.01	23	55.49	18	1.47.50	18
Matilde Pinilla	Women's slalom	DNF					
Matilde Pinilla	Women's combined	1:00.25	39	56.55	24	1:56.80	26

== Biathlon ==
Chile qualified one female biathlete.

Athlete	Event	Time	Misses	Rank
Valentina Mercado Salcedo	Sprint	40:51.5 (Note: Time adjustment +2:00.0 per ECR 11.3.3.a)	9 (4+5)	94
Valentina Mercado Salcedo	Individual	DNS		

== Cross-country skiing ==
Chile qualified two male cross-country skiers.

Athlete	Event	Qualification		Quarterfinal		Semifinal		Final	
Athlete	Event	Time	Rank	Time	Rank	Time	Rank	Time	Rank
Patricio Meliñán	7.5 km classical	—N/a						24:20.1	58
Patricio Meliñán	Sprint freestyle	3:38.36	65	Did not advance					
Cristobal Ríos	7.5 km classical	—N/a						24:54.7	62
Cristobal Ríos	Sprint freestyle	3:40.38	67	Did not advance					

== Freestyle skiing ==
Chile qualified five freestyle skiers (three men and two women).

Ski cross

Athlete	Event	Group heats		Semifinal	Final
Athlete	Event	Points	Rank	Position	Position
Clemente Costa	Men's ski cross	10	11	Did not advance	
Max von Unger	Men's ski cross	10	12	Did not advance	
Aymara Viel	Women's ski cross	13	8	Did not advance	
Renate von Unger	Women's ski cross	12	9	Did not advance	

Team

Athlete	Event	Pre-heats	Quarterfinal	Semifinal	Final
Athlete	Event	Position	Position	Position	Position
Clemente Costa; Aymara Viel	Team ski cross	—N/a	4	Did not advance	
Max von Unger; Renate von Unger	Team ski cross	—N/a	3	Did not advance	

Halfpipe, Slopestyle & Big Air

Athlete	Event	Qualification				Final				
Athlete	Event	Run 1	Run 2	Best	Rank	Run 1	Run 2	Run 3	Best	Rank
Leon Lorenzini	Men's big air	44.25	46.50	46.50	20	Did not advance				
Leon Lorenzini	Men's slopestyle	38.50	53.50	53.50	16	Did not advance				

== Snowboarding ==
Chile qualified one male snowboarder.

Halfpipe, Slopestyle & Big Air

Athlete	Event	Qualification				Final				
Athlete	Event	Run 1	Run 2	Best	Rank	Run 1	Run 2	Run 3	Best	Rank
Benjamin Villegas	Men's big air	13.25	53.50	53.50	13	Did not advance				
Benjamin Villegas	Men's slopestyle	12.50	17.50	17.50	21	Did not advance				

== See also ==
- Chile at the 2024 Summer Olympics
