= Freestyle skiing at the 2024 Winter Youth Olympics – Men's ski cross =

Men's ski cross at the IV Winter Youth Olympic Games
- Venue: High1 Resort
- Dates: 23 January
- Competitors: 28 from 15 nations

Medalists
1st place, gold medalist(s)		Niklas Höller	Germany
2nd place, silver medalist(s)		Janik Sommerer	Austria
3rd place, bronze medalist(s)		Måns Abersten	Sweden

The men's ski cross event in freestyle skiing at the 2024 Winter Youth Olympics took place on 23 January at the Welli Hilli Park.

== Results ==
The tournament was started at 11:00.

=== Heats ===
==== Panel 1 ====
Rank	Bib	Name	Country	Points	Notes
1	5	Måns Abersten	Sweden	20	Q
2	1	William Young Shing	Sweden	18	Q
3	4	Walker Robinson	United States	17	Q
4	9	Jake Dade	Great Britain	16	Q
5	24	Luis Lechner	Italy	15	
6	28	Lucas Looze	Switzerland	15	
7	16	William Kael Johnston	Canada	14	
8	21	Campbell Appel	New Zealand	13	
9	20	Bayley Sadler	Australia	13	
10	25	Jan Třešňák	Czech Republic	11	
11	8	Aiden England	United States	10	
12	12	Yu Ho-jun	South Korea	9	
13	13	Hugo Rybar	Slovakia	9	
14	17	Lee Jeong-min	South Korea	8	

==== Panel 2 ====
Rank	Bib	Name	Country	Points	Notes
1	7	Niklas Höller	Germany	20	Q
2	10	Janik Sommerer	Austria	18	Q
3	6	Duncan Cowan	Australia	16	Q
4	22	Jinichiro Ishinaka	Japan	16	Q
5	11	Cole Merret	Canada	15	
6	18	Sebastian Wild	Austria	15	
7	23	Maximilian Öller	Germany	14	
8	19	Tomáš Matoušek	Czech Republic	14	
9	15	Lorenzo Rosset	Switzerland	12	
10	27	Francesco Saletti	Italy	11	
11	2	Clemente Costa	Chile	10	
12	3	Max von Unger	Chile	10	
13	14	Ryusei Suzuki	Japan	10	
14	26	Charles Cooper	Great Britain	8	

=== Semifinals ===
Heat 1

Rank	Bib	Name	Country	Notes
1	10	Janik Sommerer	Austria	Q
2	5	Måns Abersten	Sweden	Q
3	9	Jake Dade	Great Britain	
4	6	Duncan Cowan	Australia	DNF

Heat 2

Rank	Bib	Name	Country	Notes
1	7	Niklas Höller	Germany	Q
2	4	Walker Robinson	United States	Q
3	1	William Young Shing	Sweden	
4	22	Jinichiro Ishinaka	Japan	

=== Finals ===
==== Small final ====
Rank	Bib	Name	Country	Notes
5	1	William Young Shing	Sweden	
6	6	Duncan Cowan	Australia	
7	9	Jake Dade	Great Britain	
8	22	Jinichiro Ishinaka	Japan	

==== Big final ====
Rank	Bib	Name	Country	Notes
1st place, gold medalist(s)	7	Niklas Höller	Germany	
2nd place, silver medalist(s)	10	Janik Sommerer	Austria	
3rd place, bronze medalist(s)	5	Måns Abersten	Sweden	
4	4	Walker Robinson	United States	
