= Curling at the 2024 Winter Youth Olympics – Mixed team =

Curling – Mixed team at the IV Winter Youth Olympic Games
- Venue: Gangneung Curling Centre
- Dates: January 20–25

Medalists
1st place, gold medalist(s)		Logan Carson; Tia Laurie; Archie Hyslop; Holly Burke	Great Britain
2nd place, silver medalist(s)		Jacob Schmidt; Katrine Schmidt; Nikki Jensen; Emilie Holtermann	Denmark
3rd place, bronze medalist(s)		Nathan Dryburgh; Alissa Rudolf; Livio Ernst; Jana Soltermann	Switzerland

Mixed team curling at the 2024 Winter Youth Olympics was held from January 20 to 25 at the Gangneung Curling Centre in Gangneung, South Korea.

== Teams ==
The teams are listed as follows:

Brazil	Canada	China	Denmark
Fourth: Guilherme Melo; Third: Júlia Gentile; Skip: Pedro Ribeiro; Lead: Rafaela Ladeira	Skip: Nathan Gray; Third: Chloe Fediuk; Second: Owain Fisher; Lead: Allie Iskiw	Skip: Li Zetai; Third: Chen Zaoxue; Second: Zhang Minghang; Lead: Gao Ya	Skip: Jacob Schmidt; Third: Katrine Schmidt; Second: Nikki Jensen; Lead: Emilie Holtermann
Germany	Great Britain	Italy	Japan
Skip: Lukas Jäger; Third: Emma Waltenberger; Second: David Fuß; Lead: Annelie Abdel Halim	Skip: Logan Carson; Third: Tia Laurie; Second: Archie Hyslop; Lead: Holly Burke	Skip: Andrea Gilli; Third: Giorgia Maurino; Second: Alberto Cavallero; Lead: Rebecca Mariani	Skip: Kaito Fujii; Third: Satsuki Maruzeni; Second: Koei Sato; Lead: Himari Ichiyama
New Zealand	Nigeria	Norway	South Korea
Skip: Jed Nevill; Third: Olivia Russell; Second: Jack Steele; Lead: Ellie McKenzie	Skip: Goodnews Charles; Third: Oluwanimifise Wale-Adeogun; Second: Faitu Danmola; Lead: Nkoyo Oku	Fourth: Torstein Hoeiholt Vågsnes; Third: Lydia Hågensen; Skip: Alexander Johansen; Lead: Melina Troean	Skip: Kim Dae-hyun; Third: Lee So-won; Second: Kwon Juni; Lead: Jang Yu-bin
Sweden	Switzerland	Turkey	United States
Skip: Vilmer Nygren; Third: Astrid Linder; Second: Ivan Almeling; Lead: Matilda Lindberg	Skip: Nathan Dryburgh; Third: Alissa Rudolf; Second: Livio Ernst; Lead: Jana Soltermann	Skip: Muhammed Taha Zenit; Third: Burcu Haşıl; Second: Muhammet Berat Ateş; Lead: Şüheda Karacalı	Fourth: Zachary Brenden; Skip: Kenna Ponzio; Second: Owen Nelson; Lead: Teagan Thurston

== Round robin standings ==
Final Round Robin Standings

Key
Teams to Playoffs

Group A	Skip	W	L	W–L	PF	PA	EW	EL	BE	SE	DSC
China	Li Zetai	6	1	1–0	65	25	28	17	0	12	59.04
United States	Kenna Ponzio	6	1	0–1	68	26	31	16	1	15	51.38
Japan	Kaito Fujii	5	2	1–0	64	26	27	17	2	11	39.53
Sweden	Vilmer Nygren	5	2	0–1	55	42	27	19	5	10	58.05
Norway	Alexander Johansen	3	4	–	49	39	25	19	2	11	65.33
Turkey	Muhammed Taha Zenit	2	5	–	41	40	16	26	5	5	82.17
New Zealand	Jed Nevill	1	6	–	27	44	18	23	3	6	86.52
Nigeria	Goodnews Charles	0	7	–	6	133	4	39	1	0	199.60

Group B	Skip	W	L	W–L	PF	PA	EW	EL	BE	SE	DSC
Great Britain	Logan Carson	6	1	–	44	30	26	21	4	7	51.75
Denmark	Jacob Schmidt	5	2	–	48	28	27	20	2	9	34.70
Switzerland	Nathan Dryburgh	4	3	2–0	52	35	25	23	5	7	39.96
Italy	Andrea Gilli	4	3	1–1	46	38	29	23	3	7	50.58
South Korea	Kim Dae-hyun	4	3	0–2	48	33	24	22	3	8	109.88
Canada	Nathan Gray	3	4	–	40	34	24	20	3	11	35.43
Brazil	Pedro Ribeiro	1	6	1–0	17	81	13	31	0	2	103.39
Germany	Lukas Jäger	1	6	0–1	30	46	19	27	2	5	68.51

Group A Round Robin Summary Table
Pos.	Country	China	Japan	New Zealand	Nigeria	Norway	Sweden	Turkey	United States	Record
1	China	—	7–6	9–1	22–2	11–4	4–5	6–2	6–5	6–1
3	Japan	6–7	—	6–2	20–1	8–4	10–2	8–2	6–8	5–2
7	New Zealand	1–9	2–6	—	12–1	2–5	3–9	3–6	4–8	1–6
8	Nigeria	2–22	1–20	1–12	—	0–21	0–16	2–22	0–20	0–7
5	Norway	4–11	4–8	5–2	21–0	—	7–10	5–0	3–8	3–4
4	Sweden	5–4	2–10	9–3	16–0	10–7	—	8–7	5–11	5–2
6	Turkey	2–6	2–8	6–3	22–2	0–5	7–8	—	2–8	2–5
2	United States	5–6	8–6	8–4	20–0	8–3	11–5	8–2	—	6–1

Group B Round Robin Summary Table
Pos.	Country	Brazil	Canada	Denmark	Germany	Great Britain	Italy	South Korea	Switzerland	Record
7	Brazil	—	0–14	1–14	6–4	4–9	3–10	1–17	2–13	1–6
6	Canada	14–0	—	2–4	5–2	3–6	3–8	7–9	6–5	3–4
2	Denmark	14–1	4–2	—	7–6	6–7	7–3	4–5	6–4	5–2
8	Germany	4–6	2–5	6–7	—	7–4	5–7	4–6	2–11	1–6
1	Great Britain	9–4	6–3	7–6	4–7	—	7–5	3–2	8–3	6–1
4	Italy	10–3	8–3	3–7	7–5	5–7	—	6–5	7–8	4–3
5	South Korea	17–1	9–7	5–4	6–4	2–3	5–6	—	4–8	4–3
3	Switzerland	13–2	5–6	4–6	11–2	3–8	8–7	8–4	—	4–3

== Round robin results ==
All draws are listed in Korea Standard Time (UTC+09:00).

=== Group A ===
==== Draw 1 ====
Saturday, January 20, 10:00

Sheet A	1	2	3	4	5	6	7	8	Final
United States (Ponzio)	0	2	0	1	0	3	1	1	8
Norway (Johansen)	0	0	1	0	2	0	0	0	3

Sheet B	1	2	3	4	5	6	7	8	Final
Japan (Fujii)	5	0	4	5	3	3	X	X	20
Nigeria (Charles)	0	1	0	0	0	0	X	X	1

Sheet C	1	2	3	4	5	6	7	8	Final
Turkey (Zenit)	0	1	0	0	1	0	0	X	2
China (Li)	1	0	1	0	0	3	1	X	6

Sheet D	1	2	3	4	5	6	7	8	Final
New Zealand (Nevill)	0	0	2	0	0	0	1	X	3
Sweden (Nygren)	0	4	0	1	2	2	0	X	9

==== Draw 2 ====
Saturday, January 20, 18:00

Sheet A	1	2	3	4	5	6	7	8	Final
Nigeria (Charles)	0	0	0	0	0	2	X	X	2
Turkey (Zenit)	8	2	3	4	5	0	X	X	22

Sheet B	1	2	3	4	5	6	7	8	Final
Norway (Johansen)	0	2	1	0	2	0	2	0	7
Sweden (Nygren)	3	0	0	3	0	3	0	1	10

Sheet C	1	2	3	4	5	6	7	8	Final
New Zealand (Nevill)	0	0	2	0	1	0	1	X	4
United States (Ponzio)	1	4	0	1	0	2	0	X	8

Sheet D	1	2	3	4	5	6	7	8	Final
Japan (Fujii)	2	0	1	0	0	3	0	0	6
China (Li)	0	2	0	1	0	0	2	2	7

==== Draw 3 ====
Sunday, January 21, 14:00

Sheet A	1	2	3	4	5	6	7	8	Final
Japan (Fujii)	6	2	1	1	0	0	X	X	10
Sweden (Nygren)	0	0	0	0	1	1	X	X	2

Sheet B	1	2	3	4	5	6	7	8	Final
China (Li)	3	1	3	1	1	0	X	X	9
New Zealand (Nevill)	0	0	0	0	0	1	X	X	1

Sheet C	1	2	3	4	5	6	7	8	Final
Nigeria (Charles)	0	0	0	0	0	0	X	X	0
Norway (Johansen)	2	5	4	6	2	2	X	X	21

Sheet D	1	2	3	4	5	6	7	8	Final
United States (Ponzio)	1	0	2	3	2	0	X	X	8
Turkey (Zenit)	0	1	0	0	0	1	X	X	2

==== Draw 4 ====
Monday, January 22, 10:00

Sheet A	1	2	3	4	5	6	7	8	Final
New Zealand (Nevill)	4	2	0	0	2	1	3	X	12
Nigeria (Charles)	0	0	0	1	0	0	0	X	1

Sheet B	1	2	3	4	5	6	7	8	Final
United States (Ponzio)	0	1	0	0	2	0	2	3	8
Japan (Fujii)	2	0	0	1	0	3	0	0	6

Sheet C	1	2	3	4	5	6	7	8	9	Final
Sweden (Nygren)	2	0	3	1	0	0	1	0	1	8
Turkey (Zenit)	0	1	0	0	3	0	0	3	0	7

Sheet D	1	2	3	4	5	6	7	8	Final
China (Li)	2	0	3	0	4	0	2	X	11
Norway (Johansen)	0	1	0	2	0	1	0	X	4

==== Draw 5 ====
Monday, January 22, 18:00

Sheet A	1	2	3	4	5	6	7	8	Final
Sweden (Nygren)	0	2	0	0	0	0	0	3	5
China (Li)	0	0	2	0	0	1	1	0	4

Sheet B	1	2	3	4	5	6	7	8	Final
Turkey (Zenit)	0	0	0	0	0	0	0	X	0
Norway (Johansen)	0	2	0	0	1	1	1	X	5

Sheet C	1	2	3	4	5	6	7	8	Final
Japan (Fujii)	0	0	0	1	4	0	1	X	6
New Zealand (Nevill)	0	0	1	0	0	1	0	X	2

Sheet D	1	2	3	4	5	6	7	8	Final
Nigeria (Charles)	0	0	0	0	0	0	X	X	0
United States (Ponzio)	4	3	3	1	6	3	X	X	20

==== Draw 6 ====
Tuesday, January 23, 14:00

Sheet A	1	2	3	4	5	6	7	8	Final
Turkey (Zenit)	0	0	0	0	2	0	0	X	2
Japan (Fujii)	1	3	0	1	0	1	2	X	8

Sheet B	1	2	3	4	5	6	7	8	Final
Nigeria (Charles)	0	0	0	2	0	0	X	X	2
China (Li)	6	3	5	0	6	2	X	X	22

Sheet C	1	2	3	4	5	6	7	8	Final
United States (Ponzio)	0	4	5	0	2	0	X	X	11
Sweden (Nygren)	2	0	0	2	0	1	X	X	5

Sheet D	1	2	3	4	5	6	7	8	Final
Norway (Johansen)	0	3	0	1	1	0	0	X	5
New Zealand (Nevill)	0	0	0	0	0	1	1	X	2

==== Draw 7 ====
Wednesday, January 24, 9:00

Sheet A	1	2	3	4	5	6	7	8	Final
China (Li)	2	0	2	0	0	2	0	0	6
United States (Ponzio)	0	1	0	1	1	0	1	1	5

Sheet B	1	2	3	4	5	6	7	8	Final
New Zealand (Nevill)	0	0	1	1	1	0	0	X	3
Turkey (Zenit)	0	4	0	0	0	1	1	X	6

Sheet C	1	2	3	4	5	6	7	8	Final
Norway (Johansen)	0	1	0	2	0	1	0	X	4
Japan (Fujii)	1	0	1	0	2	0	4	X	8

Sheet D	1	2	3	4	5	6	7	8	Final
Sweden (Nygren)	3	2	3	3	1	2	2	X	16
Nigeria (Charles)	0	0	0	0	0	0	0	X	0

=== Group B ===
==== Draw 1 ====
Saturday, January 20, 14:00

Sheet A	1	2	3	4	5	6	7	8	Final
Brazil (Ribeiro)	0	0	0	0	0	1	X	X	1
South Korea (Kim)	6	1	3	6	1	0	X	X	17

Sheet B	1	2	3	4	5	6	7	8	Final
Germany (Jäger)	0	0	0	1	0	1	0	X	2
Switzerland (Dryburgh)	0	3	2	0	4	0	2	X	11

Sheet C	1	2	3	4	5	6	7	8	Final
Denmark (Schmidt)	0	2	0	0	2	0	2	0	6
Great Britain (Carson)	2	0	1	1	0	1	0	2	7

Sheet D	1	2	3	4	5	6	7	8	Final
Canada (Gray)	0	1	0	1	0	1	0	0	3
Italy (Gilli)	1	0	1	0	3	0	2	1	8

==== Draw 2 ====
Sunday, January 21, 10:00

Sheet A	1	2	3	4	5	6	7	8	Final
Switzerland (Dryburgh)	0	1	0	1	0	2	0	X	4
Denmark (Schmidt)	2	0	1	0	2	0	1	X	6

Sheet B	1	2	3	4	5	6	7	8	9	Final
South Korea (Kim)	0	1	0	0	3	0	1	0	0	5
Italy (Gilli)	1	0	0	2	0	1	0	1	1	6

Sheet C	1	2	3	4	5	6	7	8	Final
Canada (Gray)	1	1	2	3	4	3	X	X	14
Brazil (Ribeiro)	0	0	0	0	0	0	X	X	0

Sheet D	1	2	3	4	5	6	7	8	Final
Germany (Jäger)	2	0	0	0	2	0	2	1	7
Great Britain (Carson)	0	0	1	1	0	2	0	0	4

==== Draw 3 ====
Sunday, January 21, 18:00

Sheet A	1	2	3	4	5	6	7	8	Final
Germany (Jäger)	0	1	0	0	2	0	2	0	5
Italy (Gilli)	1	0	1	2	0	2	0	1	7

Sheet B	1	2	3	4	5	6	7	8	Final
Great Britain (Carson)	0	0	0	3	1	0	2	X	6
Canada (Gray)	1	0	1	0	0	1	0	X	3

Sheet C	1	2	3	4	5	6	7	8	Final
Switzerland (Dryburgh)	0	1	2	0	1	0	2	2	8
South Korea (Kim)	0	0	0	2	0	2	0	0	4

Sheet D	1	2	3	4	5	6	7	8	Final
Brazil (Ribeiro)	0	0	0	0	1	0	X	X	1
Denmark (Schmidt)	3	3	2	2	0	4	X	X	14

==== Draw 4 ====
Monday, January 22, 14:00

Sheet A	1	2	3	4	5	6	7	8	Final
Canada (Gray)	0	2	0	1	0	2	0	1	6
Switzerland (Dryburgh)	2	0	1	0	2	0	0	0	5

Sheet B	1	2	3	4	5	6	7	8	Final
Brazil (Ribeiro)	0	0	1	1	0	2	0	2	6
Germany (Jäger)	1	1	0	0	1	0	1	0	4

Sheet C	1	2	3	4	5	6	7	8	Final
Italy (Gilli)	0	0	2	0	0	1	0	X	3
Denmark (Schmidt)	3	0	0	2	1	0	1	X	7

Sheet D	1	2	3	4	5	6	7	8	Final
Great Britain (Carson)	1	0	0	0	0	1	0	1	3
South Korea (Kim)	0	0	1	0	0	0	1	0	2

==== Draw 5 ====
Tuesday, January 23, 10:00

Sheet A	1	2	3	4	5	6	7	8	Final
Italy (Gilli)	2	0	1	0	1	0	1	0	5
Great Britain (Carson)	0	2	0	2	0	2	0	1	7

Sheet B	1	2	3	4	5	6	7	8	Final
Denmark (Schmidt)	0	2	0	0	1	0	1	0	4
South Korea (Kim)	1	0	0	1	0	1	0	2	5

Sheet C	1	2	3	4	5	6	7	8	Final
Germany (Jäger)	0	0	0	0	2	0	0	X	2
Canada (Gray)	1	1	3	0	0	0	0	X	5

Sheet D	1	2	3	4	5	6	7	8	Final
Switzerland (Dryburgh)	4	0	0	4	4	1	X	X	13
Brazil (Ribeiro)	0	1	1	0	0	0	X	X	2

==== Draw 6 ====
Tuesday, January 23, 18:00

Sheet A	1	2	3	4	5	6	7	8	Final
Denmark (Schmidt)	0	0	0	0	2	2	1	2	7
Germany (Jäger)	0	1	3	2	0	0	0	0	6

Sheet B	1	2	3	4	5	6	7	8	Final
Switzerland (Dryburgh)	0	0	0	2	1	0	0	0	3
Great Britain (Carson)	0	1	1	0	0	2	0	4	8

Sheet C	1	2	3	4	5	6	7	8	Final
Brazil (Ribeiro)	0	1	0	0	0	2	X	X	3
Italy (Gilli)	4	0	0	4	2	0	X	X	10

Sheet D	1	2	3	4	5	6	7	8	Final
South Korea (Kim)	0	2	0	0	3	2	0	2	9
Canada (Gray)	2	0	2	0	0	0	3	0	7

==== Draw 7 ====
Wednesday, January 24, 13:00

Sheet A	1	2	3	4	5	6	7	8	Final
Great Britain (Carson)	1	0	3	1	0	4	0	X	9
Brazil (Ribeiro)	0	1	0	0	1	0	2	X	4

Sheet B	1	2	3	4	5	6	7	8	Final
Canada (Gray)	0	0	1	0	1	0	0	0	2
Denmark (Schmidt)	0	1	0	1	0	0	1	1	4

Sheet C	1	2	3	4	5	6	7	8	Final
South Korea (Kim)	2	0	2	0	0	1	1	X	6
Germany (Jäger)	0	3	0	0	1	0	0	X	4

Sheet D	1	2	3	4	5	6	7	8	9	Final
Italy (Gilli)	0	1	1	0	2	1	0	2	0	7
Switzerland (Dryburgh)	2	0	0	4	0	0	1	0	1	8

== Playoffs ==
Qualification games
B2	Denmark	8
A3	Japan	3
A2	United States	3
B3	Switzerland	4

Semifinals
A1	China	4
B2	Denmark	6
B1	Great Britain	8
B3	Switzerland	6

Gold medal game
B2	Denmark	5
B1	Great Britain	7
Bronze medal game
A1	China	8
B3	Switzerland	10

=== Qualification Games ===
Wednesday, January 24, 19:00

Sheet A	1	2	3	4	5	6	7	8	Final
United States (Ponzio)	0	2	0	0	0	1	0	0	3
Switzerland (Dryburgh)	0	0	1	1	0	0	2	0	4

Sheet C	1	2	3	4	5	6	7	8	Final
Denmark (Schmidt)	2	1	1	0	3	0	1	X	8
Japan (Fujii)	0	0	0	1	0	2	0	X	3

=== Semifinals ===
Thursday, January 25, 9:00

Sheet A	1	2	3	4	5	6	7	8	Final
China (Li)	2	0	1	0	0	1	0	0	4
Denmark (Schmidt)	0	2	0	2	1	0	0	1	6

Sheet C	1	2	3	4	5	6	7	8	Final
Great Britain (Carson)	3	0	2	0	1	0	2	0	8
Switzerland (Dryburgh)	0	1	0	1	0	3	0	1	6

=== Bronze medal game ===
Thursday, January 25, 14:30

Sheet B	1	2	3	4	5	6	7	8	9	Final
China (Li)	1	0	0	3	0	1	0	3	0	8
Switzerland (Dryburgh)	0	2	0	0	4	0	2	0	2	10

=== Gold medal game ===
Thursday, January 25, 18:00

Sheet B	1	2	3	4	5	6	7	8	9	Final
Denmark (Schmidt)	0	4	0	0	0	0	0	1	0	5
Great Britain (Carson)	1	0	1	1	1	0	1	0	2	7

== Final standings ==
Place	Team
1st place, gold medalist(s)	Great Britain
2nd place, silver medalist(s)	Denmark
3rd place, bronze medalist(s)	Switzerland
4	China
5	United States
6	Japan
7	Italy
8	Sweden

Place	Team
9	Norway
10	South Korea
11	Canada
12	Turkey
13	New Zealand
14	Brazil
15	Germany
16	Nigeria
