= Luge at the 2024 Winter Youth Olympics – Women's doubles =

Women's doubles at the IV Winter Youth Olympic Games
- Venue: Alpensia Sliding Centre
- Dates: 21 January
- Competitors: 18 from 7 nations
- Winning time: 1:36.471

Medalists
1st place, gold medalist(s)		Alexandra Oberstolz; Katharina Sofie Kofler	Italy
2nd place, silver medalist(s)		Marie Riedl; Nina Lerch	Austria
3rd place, bronze medalist(s)		Lina Riedl; Anna Lerch	Austria

The women's doubles luge at the 2024 Winter Youth Olympics will take place on 21 January at the Alpensia Sliding Centre.

== Results ==
The first run was held at 10:50 and the second run at 11:40.

Rank	Bib	Athlete	Country	Run 1	Rank 1	Run 2	Rank 2	Total	Behind
1st place, gold medalist(s)	5	Alexandra Oberstolz; Katharina Sofie Kofler	Italy	47.975	1	48.496	1	1:36.471	
2nd place, silver medalist(s)	3	Marie Riedl; Nina Lerch	Austria	48.535	2	48.606	2	1:37.141	+0.670
3rd place, bronze medalist(s)	8	Lina Riedl; Anna Lerch	Austria	48.687	3	48.691	3	1:37.378	+0.907
4	2	Sarah Pflaume; Lina Peterseim	Germany	48.802	4	49.616	6	1:38.418	+1.947
5	9	Svitlana Solovei; Anna-Mariia Hartsula	Ukraine	49.160	5	49.266	4	1:38.426	+1.955
6	7	Zuzanna Jędrzejczyk; Zuzanna Pieron	Poland	49.449	6	49.396	5	1:38.845	+2.374
7	1	Lilly Bierast; Leandra Claus	Germany	49.933	7	50.769	7	1:40.702	+4.231
	6	Sadie Martin; Haidyn Bunker	United States	52.890	8	Did not finish			
	4	Margita Sirsniņa; Madara Pavlova	Latvia	Did not finish		Did not start			
