= Freestyle skiing at the 2024 Winter Youth Olympics – Mixed team ski cross =

Mixed team ski cross at the IV Winter Youth Olympic Games
- Venue: Welli Hilli Park
- Dates: 24 January
- Competitors: 42 from 13 nations

Medalists
| 1st place, gold medalist(s) | | William Young Shing; Alexandra Nilsson | Sweden |
| 2nd place, silver medalist(s) | | Walker Robinson; Morgan Shute | United States |
| 3rd place, bronze medalist(s) | | Lorenzo Rosset; Valentine Lagger | Switzerland |

The mixed team ski cross event in freestyle skiing at the 2024 Winter Youth Olympics took place on 24 January at the Welli Hilli Park.

== Elimination round ==
The tournament was started at 12:00.

=== Heats ===
Heat 1

| Rank | Bib | Country | Athletes | Notes |
|---|---|---|---|---|
| 1 | 17 | Japan 1 | Jinichiro Ishinaka; Koko Kawashima | Q |
| 2 | 11 | Switzerland 2 | Lorenzo Rosset; Valentine Lagger | Q |
| 3 | 16 | Japan 2 | Ryusei Suzuki; Hana Kiyota | |

Heat 3

| Rank | Bib | Country | Athletes | Notes |
|---|---|---|---|---|
| 1 | 21 | Switzerland 1 | Lucas Looze; Leena Thommen | Q |
| 2 | 12 | Austria 1 | Janik Sommerer; Lena Westermayr | Q |
| 3 | 15 | Italy 1 | Luis Lechner; Desi Rizzoli | |
| 4 | 18 | Austria 2 | Sebastian Wild; Elisabeth Walch | |

Heat 2

| Rank | Bib | Country | Athletes | Notes |
|---|---|---|---|---|
| 1 | 19 | Czech Republic 1 | Tomáš Matoušek; Nela Apolínová | Q |
| 2 | 14 | Canada 2 | William Kael Johnston; Anne-Marie Joncas | Q |
| 3 | 20 | Czech Republic 2 | Jan Třešňák; Aneta Koryntová | |
| 4 | 13 | Slovakia 2 | Hugo Rybar; Sofia Moricová | |

=== Quarterfinals ===
Heat 1

| Rank | Bib | Country | Athletes | Notes |
|---|---|---|---|---|
| 1 | 1 | United States 1 | Walker Robinson; Morgan Shute | Q |
| 2 | 21 | Switzerland 1 | Lucas Looze; Leena Thommen | Q |
| 3 | 9 | Canada 1 | Cole Merrett; Kael Oberlander | |
| 4 | 8 | Australia 1 | Duncan Cowan; Dakota Turner | |

Heat 3

| Rank | Bib | Country | Athletes | Notes |
|---|---|---|---|---|
| 1 | 5 | Sweden 1 | Måns Abersten; Uma Kruse Een | Q |
| 2 | 4 | Sweden 2 | William Young Shing; Alexandra Nilsson | Q |
| 3 | 12 | Austria 1 | Janik Sommerer; Lena Westermayr | |
| 4 | 14 | Canada 2 | William Kael Johnston; Anne-Marie Joncas | |

Heat 2

| Rank | Bib | Country | Athletes | Notes |
|---|---|---|---|---|
| 1 | 11 | Switzerland 2 | Lorenzo Rosset; Valentine Lagger | Q |
| 2 | 6 | United States 2 | Aiden England; Maggie Swain | Q |
| 3 | 3 | Chile 2 | Max von Unger; Renate von Unger | |
| 4 | 17 | Japan 1 | Jinichiro Ishinaka; Koko Kawashima | |

Heat 4

| Rank | Bib | Country | Athletes | Notes |
|---|---|---|---|---|
| 1 | 10 | Germany 1 | Niklas Höller; Romy Bovelet | Q |
| 2 | 7 | Great Britain 1 | Jake Dade; Axel Rose Green | Q |
| 3 | 19 | Czech Republic 1 | Tomáš Matoušek; Nela Apolínová | |
| 4 | 2 | Chile 1 | Clemente Costa; Aymara Viel | |

=== Semifinals ===
Heat 1

| Rank | Bib | Country | Athletes | Notes |
|---|---|---|---|---|
| 1 | 4 | Sweden 2 | William Young Shing; Alexandra Nilsson | Q |
| 2 | 1 | United States 1 | Walker Robinson; Morgan Shute | Q |
| 3 | 21 | Switzerland 1 | Lucas Looze; Leena Thommen | |
| 4 | 5 | Sweden 1 | Måns Abersten; Uma Kruse Een | |

Heat 2

| Rank | Bib | Country | Athletes | Notes |
|---|---|---|---|---|
| 1 | 10 | Germany 1 | Niklas Höller; Romy Bovelet | Q |
| 2 | 11 | Switzerland 2 | Lorenzo Rosset; Valentine Lagger | Q |
| 3 | 7 | Great Britain 1 | Jake Dade; Axel Rose Green | |
| 4 | 6 | United States 2 | Aiden England; Maggie Swain | |

=== Finals ===
==== Small final ====
| Rank | Bib | Country | Athletes | Notes |
|---|---|---|---|---|
| 5 | 21 | Switzerland 1 | Lucas Looze; Leena Thommen | |
| 6 | 7 | Great Britain 1 | Jake Dade; Axel Rose Green | |
| 7 | 6 | United States 2 | Aiden England; Maggie Swain | |

==== Big final ====
| Rank | Bib | Country | Athletes | Notes |
|---|---|---|---|---|
| 1st place, gold medalist(s) | 4 | Sweden 2 | William Young Shing; Alexandra Nilsson | |
| 2nd place, silver medalist(s) | 1 | United States 1 | Walker Robinson; Morgan Shute | |
| 3rd place, bronze medalist(s) | 11 | Switzerland 2 | Lorenzo Rosset; Valentine Lagger | |
| 4 | 10 | Germany 1 | Niklas Höller; Romy Bovelet | |
