= Alpine skiing at the 2024 Winter Youth Olympics – Women's combined =

Women's combined at the IV Winter Youth Olympic Games
- Venue: High1 Resort, South Korea
- Date: 22 January 2024
- Competitors: 56 from 28 nations
- Winning time: 1:47.96

Medalists
| 1st place, gold medalist(s) | | Maja Waroschitz | Austria |
| 2nd place, silver medalist(s) | | Giorgia Collomb | Italy |
| 3rd place, bronze medalist(s) | | Romy Ertl | Germany |

The women's combined competition of the 2024 Winter Youth Olympics was held at the High1 Resort, Jeongseon, South Korea, on Monday, 22 January 2024.

== Results ==
The super-G was started at 09:00 and the slalom was started at 13:00.

| Rank | Bib | Name | Country | Super-G | Rank | Slalom | Rank | Total | Diff |
|---|---|---|---|---|---|---|---|---|---|
| 1st place, gold medalist(s) | 49 | Maja Waroschitz | Austria | 56.38 | 3 | 51.58 | 4 | 1:47.96 | |
| 2nd place, silver medalist(s) | 7 | Giorgia Collomb | Italy | 57.51 | 13 | 50.85 | 1 | 1:48.36 | +0.40 |
| 3rd place, bronze medalist(s) | 22 | Romy Ertl | Germany | 56.85 | 8 | 51.97 | 5 | 1:48.82 | +0.86 |
| 4 | 48 | Astrid Hedin | Sweden | 57.62 | 14 | 51.49 | 3 | 1:49.11 | +1.15 |
| 5 | 10 | Fabienne Wenger | Switzerland | 55.80 | 1 | 53.89 | 18 | 1:49.69 | +1.73 |
| 6 | 11 | Shaienne Zehnder | Switzerland | 56.79 | 6 | 53.14 | 13 | 1:49.93 | +1.97 |
| 7 | 2 | Antonia Reischl | Germany | 56.84 | 7 | 53.13 | 12 | 1:49.97 | +2.01 |
| 8 | 9 | Camilla Vanni | Italy | 56.61 | 5 | 53.46 | 16 | 1:50.07 | +2.11 |
| 9 | 33 | Louise Lundquist | Sweden | 58.82 | 27 | 51.34 | 2 | 1:50.16 | +2.20 |
| 10 | 3 | Alexandra Skorokhodova | Kazakhstan | 57.96 | 16 | 52.52 | 8 | 1:50.48 | +2.52 |
| 11 | 37 | Mikoto Onishi | Japan | 57.49 | 12 | 53.05 | 11 | 1:50.54 | +2.58 |
| 12 | 20 | Nicole Begue | United States | 57.42 | 11 | 53.22 | 14 | 1:50.66 | +2.70 |
| 13 | 6 | Veronika Šrobová | Slovakia | 58.27 | 20 | 52.47 | 6 | 1:50.74 | +2.78 |
| 14 | 27 | Justine Herzog | Switzerland | 56.38 | 3 | 54.52 | 19 | 1:50.90 | +2.94 |
| 15 | 13 | Nikola Komorowska | Poland | 58.23 | 19 | 52.75 | 9 | 1:50.98 | +3.02 |
| 16 | 39 | Molly Butler | Great Britain | 58.82 | 27 | 52.47 | 6 | 1:51.29 | +3.33 |
| 17 | 21 | Sara Testut-G'Styr | France | 58.20 | 18 | 53.53 | 17 | 1:51.73 | +3.77 |
| 18 | 34 | Kia Suni | Finland | 59.11 | 30 | 52.79 | 10 | 1:51.90 | +3.94 |
| 19 | 53 | María Abad | Spain | 58.59 | 25 | 53.44 | 15 | 1:52.03 | +4.07 |
| 20 | 14 | Katrin Kudělásková | Czech Republic | 57.32 | 10 | 54.87 | 22 | 1:52.19 | +4.23 |
| 21 | 28 | Christina Winchell | United States | 58.70 | 26 | 54.68 | 20 | 1:53.38 | +5.42 |
| 22 | 38 | Hinata Fukasawa | Japan | 59.25 | 32 | 54.74 | 21 | 1:53.99 | +6.03 |
| 23 | 8 | Ana Bokal | Slovenia | 58.44 | 21 | 55.58 | 23 | 1:54.02 | +6.06 |
| 24 | 46 | Elena Drápalová | Czech Republic | 59.20 | 31 | 57.30 | 25 | 1:56.50 | +8.54 |
| 25 | 35 | Milla Anwandter | Argentina | 59.33 | 33 | 57.39 | 27 | 1:56.72 | +8.76 |
| 26 | 19 | Matilde Pinilla | Chile | 1:00.25 | 39 | 56.55 | 24 | 1:56.80 | +8.84 |
| 27 | 45 | Charlotte Wiggins | New Zealand | 59.69 | 36 | 57.35 | 26 | 1:57.04 | +9.08 |
| 28 | 56 | Frida Saḷņikova | Latvia | 1:00.19 | 38 | 58.38 | 28 | 1:58.57 | +10.61 |
| 29 | 36 | Ruby Fullerton | New Zealand | 1:00.00 | 37 | 59.10 | 29 | 1:59.10 | +11.14 |
| 30 | 41 | Choi Ye-rin | South Korea | 1:01.73 | 44 | 1:01.34 | 31 | 2:03.07 | +15.11 |
| 31 | 43 | Nahia Vieira da Fonte | Portugal | 1:03.22 | 47 | 1:02.29 | 32 | 2:05.51 | +17.55 |
| 32 | 55 | Chung Seung-yeon | South Korea | 1:02.09 | 45 | 1:04.47 | 34 | 2:06.56 | +18.60 |
| 33 | 42 | Mariia Sorokmaniuk | Ukraine | 1:05.32 | 51 | 1:01.29 | 30 | 2:06.61 | +18.65 |
| 34 | 40 | Sabina Rejepova | Uzbekistan | 1:04.73 | 50 | 1:04.27 | 33 | 2:09.00 | +21.04 |
| 35 | 52 | Zhang Guiyuan | China | 1:03.44 | 48 | 1:06.03 | 35 | 2:09.47 | +21.51 |
| 36 | 51 | Wang Ning | China | 1:04.22 | 49 | 1:08.51 | 36 | 2:12.73 | +24.77 |
| | 12 | Lana Pušnik | Slovenia | 58.15 | 17 | Did not finish | | | |
| | 15 | Eabha McKenna | Ireland | 1:01.72 | 43 | Did not finish | | | |
| | 16 | Ana Merc | Slovenia | 59.07 | 29 | Did not finish | | | |
| | 17 | Lola Blanc | France | 57.92 | 15 | Did not finish | | | |
| | 18 | Leontine Curdy | France | 57.09 | 9 | Did not finish | | | |
| | 25 | Vanesa Vulganová | Slovakia | 59.38 | 34 | Did not finish | | | |
| | 29 | Lara Markthaler | South Africa | 1:00.59 | 41 | Did not finish | | | |
| | 30 | Eva Schachner | Austria | 56.18 | 2 | Did not finish | | | |
| | 31 | Mia Chorogwická | Slovakia | 1:00.38 | 40 | Did not finish | | | |
| | 32 | Lana Hillbrand | Austria | 59.39 | 35 | Did not finish | | | |
| | 44 | Lina Gustafsson | Sweden | 58.47 | 23 | Did not finish | | | |
| | 47 | Lee Na-yae | South Korea | 1:02.63 | 46 | Did not finish | | | |
| | 50 | Amelie Björksten | Finland | 58.44 | 21 | Did not finish | | | |
| | 54 | Emma Tammemägi | Estonia | 1:00.73 | 42 | Did not finish | | | |
| | 1 | Jázmin Fernández | Argentina | 58.53 | 24 | Disqualified | | | |
| | 4 | Charlotte Grandinger | Germany | Did not finish | | | | | |
| | 5 | Florencia Aramburo | Chile | Did not finish | | | | | |
| | 24 | Rita Granruaz | Italy | Did not finish | | | | | |
| | 26 | Aada Marttila | Finland | Did not finish | | | | | |
| | 23 | Annika Hunt | United States | Did not start | | | | | |
