= Ireland at the 2024 Winter Youth Olympics =

- Flag of Ireland
- IOC code: IRL
- NOC: Olympic Federation of Ireland

in Gangwon, South Korea 19 January 2024 – 1 February 2024
- Competitors: 4 in 3 sports
- Flag bearers (opening): Finlay Wilson & Lily Cooke
- Flag bearer (closing): TBD
- Medals: Gold 0 Silver 0 Bronze 0 Total 0

Winter Youth Olympics appearances
- 2012; 2016; 2020; 2024

Ireland is scheduled to compete at the 2024 Winter Youth Olympics in Gangwon, South Korea, from January 19 to February 1, 2024. This will be Ireland's fourth appearance at the Winter Youth Olympic Games, having competed at every Games since the inaugural edition in 2012.

The Irish team consisted of four athletes (two per gender) competing in three sports. Alpine skier Finlay Wilson and luger Lily Cooke were the country's flagbearers during the opening ceremony.

== Competitors ==
The following is the list of number of competitors (per gender) participating at the games per sport/discipline.

Sport	Men	Women	Total
Alpine skiing	1	1	2
Freestyle skiing	1	0	1
Luge	0	1	1
Total	2	2	4

== Alpine skiing ==
Ireland qualified two alpine skiers (one per gender).

Athlete	Event	Run 1		Run 2		Total	
Athlete	Event	Time	Rank	Time	Rank	Time	Rank
Finlay Wilson	Super-G	—N/a				57.21	36
Finlay Wilson	Giant slalom	53.10	43	48.70	30	1:41.80	32
Finlay Wilson	Slalom	51.86	39	58.01	28	1:49.87	27
Finlay Wilson	Combined	57.97	39	1:03.51	34	2:01.48	33
Eábha McKenna	Super-G	—N/a				58.03	38
Eábha McKenna	Giant slalom	54.42	32	57.61	26	1:52.03	26
Eábha McKenna	Slalom	57.92	46	55.29	32	1:53.21	33
Eábha McKenna	Combined	1:01.72	43	DNF			

== Freestyle skiing ==
Dual moguls

Athlete	Event	Group Stage						Semifinals	Final / BM	
Athlete	Event	Opposition Result	Opposition Result	Opposition Result	Opposition Result	Points	Rank	Opposition Result	Opposition Result	Rank
Thomas Dooley	Men's dual moguls	Koehler (CAN); L 2–3	Kim (KOR); L 2–3	Nakamura (JPN); L 2–3	Hill (AUS); DNF 1–3	7	5	Did not advance		

== Luge ==
Ireland qualified one female luger.

Athlete	Event	Run 1		Run 2		Total	
Athlete	Event	Time	Rank	Time	Rank	Time	Rank
Lily Cooke	Singles	52.149	30	50.833	25	1:42.982	27

== See also ==
- Ireland at the 2024 Summer Olympics
