= Uzbekistan at the 2024 Winter Youth Olympics =

- Flag of Uzbekistan
- IOC code: UZB
- NOC: National Olympic Committee of the Republic of Uzbekistan

in Gangwon, South Korea 19 January 2024 – 1 February 2024
- Competitors: 2 in 1 sport
- Flag bearers (opening): Rauan Raimkulov & Sabina Rejepova
- Flag bearer (closing): TBD
- Medals: Gold 0 Silver 0 Bronze 0 Total 0

Winter Youth Olympics appearances (overview)
- 2012; 2016; 2020; 2024

Uzbekistan competed at the 2024 Winter Youth Olympics in Gangwon, South Korea, from January 19 to February 1, 2024. This was Uzbekistan's third appearance at the Winter Youth Olympic Games, having debuted at the Games at the first edition in 2012.

The Uzbekistani team consisted of two alpine skiers (one per gender). Alpine skiers Rauan Raimkulov and Sabina Rejepova were the country's flagbearers during the opening ceremony.

== Competitors ==
The following is the list of number of competitors (per gender) participating at the games per sport/discipline.

Sport	Men	Women	Total
Alpine skiing	1	1	2
Total	1	1	2

== Alpine skiing ==
Uzbekistan qualified two alpine skiers (one per gender).

Athlete	Event	Run 1		Run 2		Total	
Athlete	Event	Time	Rank	Time	Rank	Time	Rank
Rauan Raimkulov	Men's super-G	—N/a				1:00.24	47
Rauan Raimkulov	Men's giant slalom	54.43	50	51.11	39	1:45.54	38
Rauan Raimkulov	Men's slalom	53.59	50	59.08	31	1:52.67	31
Rauan Raimkulov	Men's combined	59.72	48	1:02.87	33	2:02.59	34
Sabina Rejepova	Women's super-G	—N/a				1:04.07	49
Sabina Rejepova	Women's giant slalom	58.84	41	1:01.54	34	2:00.38	34
Sabina Rejepova	Women's slalom	1:02.48	51	1:00.26	37	2:02.74	36
Sabina Rejepova	Women's combined	1:04.73	50	1:04.27	33	2:09.00	34

== See also ==
- Uzbekistan at the 2024 Summer Olympics
