= Austria at the 2024 Winter Youth Olympics =

- Flag of Austria
- IOC code: AUT
- NOC: Austrian Olympic Committee

in Gangwon, South Korea 19 January 2024 – 1 February 2024
- Flag bearer (opening): Paul Socher & Jeannine Rosner
- Flag bearer (closing): TBD
- Medals Ranked 7th: Gold 5 Silver 6 Bronze 5 Total 16

Winter Youth Olympics appearances (overview)
- 2012; 2016; 2020; 2024

Austria is scheduled to compete at the 2024 Winter Youth Olympics in Gangwon, South Korea, from January 19 to February 1, 2024. This will be Austria's fourth appearance at the Winter Youth Olympic Games, having competed at every Games since the inaugural edition in 2012.

Luger Paul Socher and speed skater Jeannine Rosner were the country's flagbearers during the opening ceremony.

== Medalists ==
Medal	Name	Sport	Event	Date
Gold	Maja Waroschitz	Alpine skiing	Women's combined	22 January
Gold	Hanna Karrer	Snowboarding	Women's slopestyle	24 January
Gold	Maja Waroschitz	Alpine skiing	Women's slalom	25 January
Gold	Maja Waroschitz; Florian Neumayer	Alpine skiing	Parallel mixed team	26 January
Gold	Andreas Gfrerer	Nordic combined	Men's individual normal hill/6 km	29 January
Silver	Nikolaus Humml	Ski jumping	Men's individual normal hill	20 January
Silver	Paul Socher	Luge	Men's singles	21 January
Silver	Eva Schachner	Alpine skiing	Women's super-G	21 January
Silver	Marie Riedl; Nina Lerch	Luge	Women's doubles	21 January
Silver	Asaja Sturm	Alpine skiing	Men's super-G	21 January
Silver	Janik Sommerer	Freestyle skiing	Men's ski cross	23 January
Bronze	Marie Riedl	Luge	Women's singles	20 January
Bronze	Lina Riedl; Anna Lerch	Luge	Women's doubles	21 January
Bronze	Sara Pokorny; Niki Humml; Meghann Wadsak; Lukas Haagen	Ski jumping	Mixed team normal hill	21 January
Bronze	Marie Riedl; Johannes Scharnagl; Moritz Schiegl; Paul Socher	Luge	Team relay	23 January
Bronze	Florian Neumayer	Alpine skiing	Men's giant slalom	24 January

== Alpine skiing ==
Men

Athlete	Event	Run 1		Run 2		Total	
Athlete	Event	Time	Rank	Time	Rank	Time	Rank
Leon Hafner	Super-G	—				55.43	17
Leon Hafner	Giant slalom	49.32	5	48.02	24	1:37.34	11
Leon Hafner	Slalom	DNF					
Leon Hafner	Combined	54.40	2	56.73	19	1:51.13	12
Florian Neumayer	Super-G	—				54.87	4
Florian Neumayer	Giant slalom	49.80	7	45.57	2	1:35.37	3rd place, bronze medalist(s)
Florian Neumayer	Slalom	48.16	10	DNF			
Florian Neumayer	Combined	55.89	19	DNF			
Asaja Sturm	Super-G	—				54.43	2nd place, silver medalist(s)
Asaja Sturm	Giant slalom	51.17	21	45.75	4	1:36.92	7
Asaja Sturm	Slalom	DNF					
Asaja Sturm	Combined	55.46	13	55.27	7	1:50.73	8

Women

Athlete	Event	Run 1		Run 2		Total	
Athlete	Event	Time	Rank	Time	Rank	Time	Rank
Lana Hillbrand	Super-G	—				56.94	32
Lana Hillbrand	Giant slalom	DNF					
Lana Hillbrand	Slalom	DNF					
Lana Hillbrand	Combined	59.39	35	DNF			
Eva Schachner	Super-G	—				53.61	2nd place, silver medalist(s)
Eva Schachner	Giant slalom	50.39	16	DNF			
Eva Schachner	Slalom	53.27	25	49.50	14	1:42.77	18
Eva Schachner	Combined	56.18	2	DNF			
Maja Waroschitz	Super-G	—				55.13	14
Maja Waroschitz	Giant slalom	DNF					
Maja Waroschitz	Slalom	49.35	1	48.14	2	1:37.49	1st place, gold medalist(s)
Maja Waroschitz	Combined	56.38	3	51.58	4	1:47.96	1st place, gold medalist(s)

Mixed

Athlete	Event	Round of 16	Quarterfinals	Semifinals	Final / BM	
Athlete	Event	Opposition Result	Opposition Result	Opposition Result	Opposition Result	Rank
Maja Waroschitz; Florian Neumayer	Parallel mixed team	Japan; W 3–1	Germany; W 3–1	United States; W 3–1	Sweden; W 2*–2	1st place, gold medalist(s)

== Biathlon ==
Men

Athlete	Event	Time	Misses	Rank
Simon Grasberger	Sprint	24:24.7	4 (1+3)	42
Simon Grasberger	Individual	47:45.6	7 (1+3+0+3)	34
Simon Hechenberger	Sprint	25:59.3	5 (2+3)	72
Simon Hechenberger	Individual	47:04.5	4 (0+1+2+1)	30
Matthäus Schönaigner	Sprint	22:30.9	3 (1+2)	7
Matthäus Schönaigner	Individual	48:16.1	9 (4+2+1+2)	41
Magnus Steiner	Sprint	25:39.1	5 (2+3)	69
Magnus Steiner	Individual	49:37.9	9 (1+2+3+3)	56

Women

Athlete	Event	Time	Misses	Rank
Lilly Fuchs	Sprint	22:41.7	4 (2+2)	30
Lilly Fuchs	Individual	45:18.2	5 (1+3+0+1)	58
Rosaly Mavie Stollberger	Sprint	21:51.7	1 (0+1)	16
Rosaly Mavie Stollberger	Individual	39:31.9	2 (0+1+1+0)	9
Anna-Lena Wolf	Sprint	24:07.1	4 (3+1)	44
Anna-Lena Wolf	Individual	43:49.2	6 (1+1+1+3)	42
Ilka Zleptnig	Sprint	26:02.9	6 (4+2)	66
Ilka Zleptnig	Individual	47:47.6	7 (0+3+2+2)	75

Mixed

Athletes	Event	Time	Misses	Rank
Rosaly Stollberger; Simon Grasberger	Single mixed relay	47:52.7	17 (3+14)	12
Anna-Lena Wolf; Lilly Fuchs; Simon Grasberger; Matthäus Schönaigner	Mixed relay	1:22:25.9	19 (3+16)	7

== Bobsleigh ==
Austria qualified one male bobsledder.

Athlete	Event	Run 1		Run 2		Total	
Athlete	Event	Time	Rank	Time	Rank	Time	Rank
Henning Beierl	Men's	55.54	10	56.52	15	1:52.06	12

== Cross-country skiing ==
Men

Athlete	Event	Qualification		Quarterfinal		Semifinal		Final	
Athlete	Event	Time	Rank	Time	Rank	Time	Rank	Time	Rank
Elias Eischer	7.5 km classical	—						21:01.7	24
Elias Eischer	Sprint freestyle	3:03.98	1 Q	3:04.65	1 Q	3:10.66	3	Did not advance	
Niklas Walcher	7.5 km classical	—						21:51.0	38
Niklas Walcher	Sprint freestyle	3:18.10	36	Did not advance					

Women

Athlete	Event	Qualification		Quarterfinal		Semifinal		Final	
Athlete	Event	Time	Rank	Time	Rank	Time	Rank	Time	Rank
Heidi Bucher	7.5 km classical	—						22:50.7	8
Heidi Bucher	Sprint freestyle	3:40.39	18 Q	3:34.19	2 Q	3:36.75	2 Q	3:48.78	6
Katharina Engelhardt	7.5 km classical	—						24:07.2	26
Katharina Engelhardt	Sprint freestyle	3:48.32	28 Q	3:45.92	5	Did not advance			

Mixed

Athlete	Event	Time	Rank
Heidi Bucher; Niklas Walcher; Katharina Engelhardt; Elias Eischer	Mixed relay	55:54.1	11

== Curling ==
Austria qualified a mixed doubles pair for a total of two athletes (one per gender).

Summary

Team	Event	Group Stage						Quarterfinal	Semifinal	Final / BM	
Team	Event	Opposition Score	Opposition Score	Opposition Score	Opposition Score	Opposition Score	Rank	Opposition Score	Opposition Score	Opposition Score	Rank
Emma Müller; Luis Heinisch	Mixed doubles	Germany; L 5–9	Kazakhstan; W	Italy; W 6–5	Denmark; L 4–11	Switzerland; L 3–9	4	Did not advance			13

=== Mixed doubles ===
Group D	W	L	W–L	DSC
Denmark	4	1	1–1	30.64
Germany	4	1	1–1	31.04
Switzerland	4	1	1–1	79.90
Austria	2	3	–	40.68
Kazakhstan	1	4	–	44.33
Italy	0	5	–	107.78

Round robin

Draw 1

Friday, January 26, 18:00

Sheet A	1	2	3	4	5	6	7	8	Final
Austria (Müller / Heinisch)	0	2	0	0	1	0	1	1	5
Germany (Sutor / Angrick)	2	0	3	3	0	1	0	0	9

Draw 4

Saturday, January 27, 18:00

Sheet D	1	2	3	4	5	6	7	8	Final
Austria (Müller / Heinisch)	0	0	1	1	0	2	1		W
Kazakhstan (Tastemir / Tastemir)	2	1	0	0	1	0	0	/	L

- Kazakhstan forfeited the game (ran out of time during end 8, 1 stone remaining)

Draw 6

Sunday, January 28, 14:00

Sheet B	1	2	3	4	5	6	7	8	Final
Italy (Maioni / Nichelatti)	1	0	1	1	0	2	0	0	5
Austria (Müller / Heinisch)	0	2	0	0	2	0	1	1	6

Draw 8

Monday, January 29, 10:00

Sheet C	1	2	3	4	5	6	7	8	Final
Austria (Müller / Heinisch)	0	2	0	1	0	1	X	X	4
Denmark (Schmidt / Schmidt)	4	0	6	0	1	0	X	X	11

Draw 11

Tuesday, January 30, 10:00

Sheet D	1	2	3	4	5	6	7	8	Final
Switzerland (Haehlen / Caccivio)	3	2	0	1	1	0	2	X	9
Austria (Müller / Heinisch)	0	0	1	0	0	2	0	X	3

== Freestyle skiing ==
Ski cross

Athlete	Event	Group heats		Semifinal	Final
Athlete	Event	Points	Rank	Position	Position
Janik Sommerer	Men's ski cross	18	2 Q	1 BF	2nd place, silver medalist(s)
Sebastian Wild	Men's ski cross	15	6	Did not advance	
Elisabeth Walch	Women's ski cross	DNS			
Lena Westermayr	Women's ski cross	11	9	Did not advance	

Team

Athlete	Event	Pre-heats	Quarterfinal	Semifinal	Final
Athlete	Event	Position	Position	Position	Position
Janik Sommerer; Lena Westermayr	Team ski cross	2 Q	3	Did not advance	
Sebastian Wild; Elisabeth Walch	Team ski cross	DNS			

== Ice hockey ==
Austria qualified a team of thirteen ice hockey players for the men's 3-on-3 ice hockey tournament.

Roster

Florian Mühlstein served as head coach.

- Simon Cseh – A
- Luca Fischer
- Martin Haim
- Benedikt Hengelmüller
- Marc Hudritsch
- Gabriel Lemberger
- Ben Öfner – A
- Jonathan Oschgan
- Paul Schuster
- Paul Sintschnig
- Luc van Ee – C
- Paul Loui Vaschauner
- Rafael Wagnsonner

Summary

Key:
- GWS – Match decided by penalty-shootout

Team	Event	Group stage								Semifinal	Final	
Team	Event	Opponent Score	Opponent Score	Opponent Score	Opponent Score	Opponent Score	Opponent Score	Opponent Score	Rank	Opponent Score	Opponent Score	Rank
Austria	Men's 3x3 tournament	Great Britain; W 12–3	Kazakhstan; W 9–8	Chinese Taipei; W 18–1	Spain; W 4–3	Latvia; L 3–9	Denmark; W 7–5	Poland; L 2–3	2 Q	Denmark; L 3–5	Kazakhstan; L 5–6	4

=== Men's 3x3 tournament ===
Preliminary round

Pos	Team	Pld	W	SOW	SOL	L	GF	GA	GD	Pts	Qualification
1	Latvia	7	7	0	0	0	119	31	+88	21	Semifinals
2	Austria	7	5	0	0	2	55	32	+23	15 (Note: Austria 7–5 Denmark)	Semifinals
3	Denmark	7	5	0	0	2	70	39	+31	15	Semifinals
4	Kazakhstan	7	4	0	0	3	93	59	+34	12 (Note: Poland 8–18 Kazakhstan)	Semifinals
5	Poland	7	4	0	0	3	58	59	−1	12	
6	Great Britain	7	2	0	0	5	46	97	−51	6	
7	Chinese Taipei	7	1	0	0	6	23	95	−72	3	
8	Spain	7	0	0	0	7	28	80	−52	0	

Source: Gangwon 2024
Notes:

20 January 2024; 12:00	Austria	12–3 (1–1, 4–2, 7–0)	Great Britain	Gangneung Hockey Centre

Game reference
Referees: (South Korea) Lim Jun-seo (Czech Republic) David Thuma

21 January 2024; 10:30	Kazakhstan	8–9 (4–4, 4–4, 0–1)	Austria	Gangneung Hockey Centre

Game reference
Referees: (South Korea) Lim Jun-seo (United Kingdom) Joseph Sewell

21 January 2024; 17:30	Austria	18–1 (3–1, 8–1, 7–0)	Chinese Taipei	Gangneung Hockey Centre

Game reference
Referees: (South Korea) Lim Jun-seo (Uzbekistan) David Prokofyev

22 January 2024; 09:00	Spain	3–4 (0–1, 1–2, 2–1)	Austria	Gangneung Hockey Centre

Game reference
Referees: (Canada) Mathieu Boudreau (United Kingdom) Joseph Sewell

22 January 2024; 16:00	Latvia	9–3 (2–0, 3–0, 4–3)	Austria	Gangneung Hockey Centre

Game reference
Referees: (Uzbekistan) David Prokofyev (United Kingdom) Joseph Sewell

23 January 2024; 10:30	Austria	7–5 (2–1, 2–1, 3–3)	Denmark	Gangneung Hockey Centre

Game reference
Referees: (Canada) Mathieu Boudreau (United Kingdom) Joseph Sewell

23 January 2024; 17:30	Austria	2–3 (1–0, 0–1, 1–2)	Poland	Gangneung Hockey Centre

Game reference
Referees: (Canada) Mathieu Boudreau (United Kingdom) Joseph Sewell

Semifinal

24 January 2024; 13:30	Austria	3–5 (2–1, 0–2, 1–2)	Denmark	Gangneung Hockey Centre

Game reference
Referees: (United Kingdom) Joseph Sewell (Czech Republic) David Thuma

Bronze medal game

25 January 2024; 12:00	Austria	5–6 (1–4, 2–1, 2–1)	Kazakhstan	Gangneung Hockey Centre

Game reference
Referees: (South Korea) Lim Jun-seo (United Kingdom) Joseph Sewell

== Luge ==
Austria qualified nine lugers.

Men

Athlete	Event	Run 1		Run 2		Total	
Athlete	Event	Time	Rank	Time	Rank	Time	Rank
Johannes Scharnagl	Singles	46.815	5	46.789	5	1:33.604	5
Paul Socher	Singles	46.226	1	46.315	2	1:32.541	2nd place, silver medalist(s)
Johannes Scharnagl; Moritz Schiegl	Doubles	47.793	4	48.433	4	1:36.228	4

Women

Athlete	Event	Run 1		Run 2		Total	
Athlete	Event	Time	Rank	Time	Rank	Time	Rank
Viktoria Gasser	Singles	48.878	8	48.525	4	1:37.403	8
Marie Riedl	Singles	48.250	3	48.678	5	1:36.928	3rd place, bronze medalist(s)
Lina Angelika Riedl; Anna Lerch	Doubles	48.687	3	48.691	3	1:37.378	3rd place, bronze medalist(s)
Marie Riedl; Nina Lerch	Doubles	48.535	2	48.606	2	1:37.141	2nd place, silver medalist(s)

Mixed team relay

Athlete	Event	Women' singles		Men' singles		Doubles		Total	
Athlete	Event	Time	Rank	Time	Rank	Time	Rank	Time	Rank
Marie Riedl; Johannes Scharnagl; Moritz Schiegl; Paul Socher	Team relay	49.693	5	49.905	1	50.823	3	2:30.421	3rd place, bronze medalist(s)

== Nordic combined ==
Athlete	Event	Ski jumping			Cross-country		Total	
Athlete	Event	Distance	Points	Rank	Time	Rank	Time	Rank
Andreas Gfrerer	Men's normal hill/6 km	112.0	141.0	1	13:23.8	8	13:23.8	1st place, gold medalist(s)
David Liegl	Men's normal hill/6 km	105.0	129.6	6	13:22.5	7	14:08.5	4
Katharina Gruber	Women's normal hill/4 km	76.5	61.5	19	10:33.3	9	15:20.3	19
Clara Mentil	Women's normal hill/4 km	93.0	95.2	13	11:26.3	19	13:58.3	15
Katharina Gruber; Andreas Gfrerer; David Liegl; Clara Mentil	Mixed team	387.0	425.2	4	34:21.0	5	34:44.0	4

== Skeleton ==
Athlete	Event	Run 1		Run 2		Total	
Athlete	Event	Time	Rank	Time	Rank	Time	Rank
Sarah Baumgartner	Women's	55.22	4	55.19	5	1:50.41	6

== Ski jumping ==
Individual

Athlete	Event	First round			Final			Total	
Athlete	Event	Distance	Points	Rank	Distance	Points	Rank	Points	Rank
Lukas Haagen	Men's normal hill	99.0	101.5	6	102.0	102.5	5	204.0	6
Nikolaus Humml	Men's normal hill	98.0	98.2	8	106.0	112.5	1	210.7	2nd place, silver medalist(s)
Sara Pokorny	Women's normal hill	90.0	75.0	12	87.0	71.0	13	146.0	12
Meghann Wadsak	Women's normal hill	88.0	72.5	14	84.0	64.1	17	136.6	13

Team

Athlete	Event	First round			Final			Total	
Athlete	Event	Distance	Points	Rank	Distance	Points	Rank	Points	Rank
Sara Pokorny; Nikolaus Humml; Meghann Wadsak; Lukas Haagen	Mixed team	383.0	383.8	3	379.5	391.2	3	775.0	3rd place, bronze medalist(s)

== Snowboarding ==
Snowboard cross

Athlete	Event	Group heats		Semifinal	Final
Athlete	Event	Points	Rank	Position	Position
David Erhard	Men's snowboard cross	13	9	Did not advance	
Moritz Murer	Men's snowboard cross	12	9	Did not advance	

Halfpipe, Slopestyle, & Big Air

Athlete	Event	Qualification				Final				
Athlete	Event	Run 1	Run 2	Best	Rank	Run 1	Run 2	Run 3	Best	Rank
Hanna Karrer	Women's big air	92.00	25.50	92.00	1 Q	84.75	62.00	18.75	146.75	6
Hanna Karrer	Women's slopestyle	17.25	63.25	63.25	6 Q	61.50	89.00	26.75	89.00	1st place, gold medalist(s)

== Speed skating ==
Men

Athlete	Event	Time	Rank
Paul Wörle	500 m	41.29	27
Paul Wörle	1500 m	2:12.95	31

Women

Athlete	Event	Time	Rank
Jeannine Rosner	500 m	DNF	
Jeannine Rosner	1500 m	2:06.14	5
Sarah Rosner	500 m	43.442	25
Sarah Rosner	1500 m	2:20.68	27

Mass Start

Athlete	Event	Semifinal			Final		
Athlete	Event	Points	Time	Rank	Points	Time	Rank
Paul Wörle	Men's mass start	0	6:26.84	11	Did not advance		
Jeannine Rosner	Women's mass start	3	6:00.56	6 Q	1	5:55.82	8
Sarah Rosner	Women's mass start	0	6:30.48	15	Did not advance		

== See also ==
- Austria at the 2024 Summer Olympics
