= Alpine skiing at the 2024 Winter Youth Olympics – Women's super-G =

Women's super-G at the IV Winter Youth Olympic Games
- Venue: High1 Resort, South Korea
- Date: 21 January 2024
- Competitors: 61 from 33 nations
- Winning time: 53.54

Medalists
1st place, gold medalist(s)		Camilla Vanni	Italy
2nd place, silver medalist(s)		Eva Schachner	Austria
3rd place, bronze medalist(s)		Shaienne Zehnder	Switzerland

The women's Super-G competition of the 2024 Winter Youth Olympics was held at the High1 Resort, Jeongseon, South Korea, on Sunday, 21 January 2024.

== Results ==
The race was started at 10:00.

Rank	Bib	Name	Country	Time	Difference
1st place, gold medalist(s)	10	Camilla Vanni	Italy	53.54	
2nd place, silver medalist(s)	14	Eva Schachner	Austria	53.61	+0.07
3rd place, bronze medalist(s)	11	Shaienne Zehnder	Switzerland	53.75	+0.21
4	6	Justine Herzog	Switzerland	53.96	+0.42
5	8	Fabienne Wenger	Switzerland	54.01	+0.47
6	22	Nicole Begue	United States	54.22	+0.68
6	15	Giorgia Collomb	Italy	54.22	+0.68
8	46	Astrid Hedin	Sweden	54.32	+0.78
9	18	Leontine Curdy	France	54.37	+0.83
10	17	Sara Testut-G'Styr	France	54.38	+0.84
11	16	Antonia Reischl	Austria	54.51	+0.97
12	1	Jázmin Fernández	Argentina	54.72	+1.18
13	13	Romy Ertl	Germany	54.89	+1.35
14	47	Maja Waroschitz	Austria	55.13	+1.59
15	60	Lina Gustafsson	Sweden	55.36	+1.82
16	2	Veronika Šrobová	Slovakia	55.38	+1.84
17	3	Nikola Komorowska	Poland	55.52	+1.98
18	45	Alexandra Skorokhodova	Kazakhstan	55.71	+2.17
19	19	Katrin Kudělásková	Czech Republic	55.96	+2.42
20	24	Matilde Pinilla	Chile	56.07	+2.53
21	36	Mikoto Onishi	Japan	56.08	+2.54
22	48	María Abad	Spain	56.16	+2.62
22	23	Christina Winchell	United States	56.16	+2.62
24	32	Kia Suni	Finland	56.21	+2.67
25	51	Amelie Björksten	Finland	56.25	+2.71
26	37	Hinata Fukasawa	Japan	56.42	+2.88
27	38	Molly Butler	Great Britain	56.44	+2.90
28	29	Lola Blanc	France	56.52	+2.98
29	31	Louise Lundquist	Sweden	56.59	+3.05
30	58	Elena Drápalová	Czech Republic	56.66	+3.12
31	30	Lana Pušnik	Slovenia	56.79	+3.25
32	28	Lana Hillbrand	Austria	56.94	+3.40
33	27	Lara Markthaler	South Africa	57.13	+3.59
34	54	Charlotte Wiggins	New Zealand	57.39	+3.85
35	21	Florencia Aramburo	Chile	57.52	+3.98
36	34	Ruby Fullerton	New Zealand	57.56	+4.02
37	26	Ana Merc	Slovenia	57.79	+4.25
38	35	Eabha McKenna	Ireland	58.03	+4.49
39	33	Milla Anwandter	Argentina	58.27	+4.73
40	41	Frīda Saļņikova	Latvia	58.48	+4.94
41	53	Emma Tammemägi	Estonia	58.70	+5.16
42	52	Choi Ye-rin	South Korea	59.24	+5.70
43	57	Chung Seung-yeon	South Korea	59.44	+5.90
44	50	Lee Na-yae	South Korea	1:00.63	+7.09
45	43	Zhang Guiyuan	China	1:01.66	+8.12
46	42	Mariia Sorokmaniuk	Ukraine	1:01.84	+8.30
47	59	Wang Ning	China	1:02.27	+8.73
48	56	Nahia Vieira da Fonte	Portugal	1:02.30	+8.76
49	40	Sabina Rejepova	Uzbekistan	1:04.07	+10.53
	4	Charlotte Grandinger	Germany	Did not finish	
	5	Ana Bokal	Slovenia	Did not finish	
	7	Annika Hunt	United States	Did not finish	
	9	Vanesa Vulganová	Slovakia	Did not finish	
	12	Rita Granruaz	Italy	Did not finish	
	20	Mia Chorogwická	Slovakia	Did not finish	
	25	Aada Marttila	Finland	Did not finish	
	39	Ioana Corlățeanu	Romania	Did not start	
	44	Laxmi Rai	Nepal	Did not start	
	49	Elsa Feliciello	Canada	Did not start	
	55	Khaliun Khuderchuluun	Mongolia	Did not start	
	61	Kiana Sakkal	Lebanon	Did not start	
