= Alpine skiing at the 2024 Winter Youth Olympics – Parallel mixed team =

Parallel mixed team at the IV Winter Youth Olympic Games
- Venue: High1 Resort
- Date: 26 January
- Competitors: 32 from 16 nations

Medalists
1st place, gold medalist(s)		Maja Waroschitz; Florian Neumayer	Austria
2nd place, silver medalist(s)		Astrid Hedin; Elliot Westlund	Sweden
3rd place, bronze medalist(s)		Amelie Björksten; Altti Pyrrö	Finland

The parallel mixed team competition of the 2024 Winter Youth Olympics was held at High1 Resort, Jeongseon, South Korea on Friday, 26 January 2024.

== Participants ==
Bib	Name	Country
11; 12	Shaienne Zehnder; Romain Monney	Switzerland
21; 22	Camilla Vanni; Pietro Scesa	Italy
31; 32	Romy Ertl; Leo Scherer	Germany
41; 42	Sara Testut-G'Styr; Nash Huot-Marchand	France
51; 52	Astrid Hedin; Elliot Westlund	Sweden
61; 62	Maja Waroschitz; Florian Neumayer	Austria
71; 72	Annika Hunt; Jevin Palmquist	United States
81; 82	Amelie Björksten; Altti Pyrrö	Finland
91; 92	Ana Bokal; Miha Oserban	Slovenia
101; 102	Veronika Šrobová; Andrej Barnáš	Slovakia
111; 112	Mikoto Onishi; Neo Kamada	Japan
121; 122	Molly Butler; Zak Carrick-Smith	Great Britain
131; 132	Aida Draghia; Thomas Carnahan	Canada
141; 142	Nikola Komorowska; Stanisław Sarzyński	Poland
151; 152	Milla Anwandter; Nicolás Quintero	Argentina
161; 162	Lee Na-yae; Kim Se-hyun	South Korea

== Bracket ==
Round of 16
Switzerland	3
South Korea	1
Finland	3
Slovenia	2
Sweden	3
Great Britain	1
France	3
Canada	1
Germany	2*
Poland	2
Austria	3
Japan	1
United States	3
Slovakia	1
Italy	3
Argentina	1

Quarterfinals
Switzerland	2
Finland	2*
Sweden	2*
France	2
Germany	1
Austria	3
United States	2*
Italy	2

Semifinals
Finland	0
Sweden	4
Austria	3
United States	1

Final
Sweden	2
Austria	2*
Third place
Finland	2*
United States	2

== External list ==
- Bracket
