= Freestyle skiing at the 2024 Winter Youth Olympics – Women's ski cross =

Women's ski cross at the IV Winter Youth Olympic Games
- Venue: High1 Resort
- Dates: 23 January
- Competitors: 23 from 14 nations

Medalists
1st place, gold medalist(s)		Uma Kruse Een	Sweden
2nd place, silver medalist(s)		Morgan Shute	United States
3rd place, bronze medalist(s)		Leena Thommen	Switzerland

The women's ski cross event in freestyle skiing at the 2024 Winter Youth Olympics took place on 23 January at the Welli Hilli Park.

== Results ==
The tournament was started at 11:00.

=== Heats ===
==== Panel 1 ====
Rank	Bib	Name	Country	Points	Notes
1	1	Morgan Shute	United States	20	Q
2	13	Leena Thommen	Switzerland	19	Q
3	9	Axel Rose Green	United States	18	Q
4	21	Nela Apolínová	Czech Republic	16	Q
5	8	Fanni Szeghalmi	Hungary	16	
6	12	Anne-Marie Joncas	Canada	15	
7	16	Dakota Turner	Australia	15	
8	4	Aymara Viel	Chile	13	
9	5	Renate von Unger	Chile	12	
10	20	Hana Kiyota	Japan	11	
11	17	Sofia Moricová	Slovakia	10	

==== Panel 2 ====
Rank	Bib	Name	Country	Points	Notes
1	2	Uma Kruse Een	Sweden	20	Q
2	7	Alexandra Nilsson	Sweden	19	Q
3	10	Valentine Lagger	Switzerland	18	Q
4	11	Kael Oberlander	Canada	17	Q
5	3	Maggie Swain	United States	16	
6	22	Romy Bovelet	Germany	15	
7	14	Koko Kawashima	Japan	14	
8	6	Desi Rizzoli	Italy	13	
9	18	Lena Westermayr	Austria	11	
10	15	Aneta Koryntová	Czech Republic	11	
11	23	Dóra Tymcyna	Hungary	9	
	3	Elisabeth Walch	Austria	DNS	

=== Semifinals ===
Heat 1

Rank	Bib	Name	Country	Notes
1	1	Morgan Shute	United States	Q
2	10	Valentine Lagger	Switzerland	Q
3	7	Alexandra Nilsson	Sweden	
4	21	Nela Apolínová	Czech Republic	

Heat 2

Rank	Bib	Name	Country	Notes
1	2	Uma Kruse Een	Sweden	Q
2	13	Leena Thommen	Switzerland	Q
3	9	Axel Rose Green	United States	
4	11	Kael Oberlander	Canada	

=== Finals ===
==== Small final ====
Rank	Bib	Name	Country	Notes
5	7	Alexandra Nilsson	Sweden	
6	9	Axel Rose Green	United States	
7	11	Kael Oberlander	Canada	
8	21	Nela Apolínová	Czech Republic	

==== Big final ====
Rank	Bib	Name	Country	Notes
1st place, gold medalist(s)	2	Uma Kruse Een	Sweden	
2nd place, silver medalist(s)	1	Morgan Shute	United States	
3rd place, bronze medalist(s)	13	Leena Thommen	Switzerland	
4	10	Valentine Lagger	Switzerland	
