= Czech Republic at the 2024 Winter Youth Olympics =

- Flag of Czech Republic
- IOC code: CZE
- NOC: Czech Olympic Committee

in Gangwon, South Korea 19 January 2024 – 1 February 2024
- Competitors: 62 in 12 sports
- Flag bearers (opening): Lukáš Kulhánek & Ilona Plecháčová
- Flag bearer (closing): TBD
- Medals Ranked 19th: Gold 1 Silver 1 Bronze 2 Total 4

Winter Youth Olympics appearances (overview)
- 2012; 2016; 2020; 2024

The Czech Republic is scheduled to compete at the 2024 Winter Youth Olympics in Gangwon, South Korea, from January 19 to February 1, 2024. This will be the Czech Republic's fourth appearance at the Winter Youth Olympic Games, having competed at every Games since the inaugural edition in 2012.

Biathletes Lukáš Kulhánek and Ilona Plecháčová were the country's flagbearers during the opening ceremony.

== Competitors ==
The following is the list of number of competitors (per gender) participating at the games per sport/discipline.

Sport	Men	Women	Total
Alpine skiing	1	2	3
Biathlon	4	4	8
Cross-country skiing	2	2	4
Curling	1	1	2
Figure skating	2	2	4
Freestyle skiing	4	3	7
Ice hockey	18	0	18
Luge	3	0	3
Nordic combined	2	2	4
Short track speed skating	0	1	1
Ski jumping	2	2	4
Snowboarding	2	3	5
Total	41	21	62

- One female athlete will compete in ski jumping and Nordic combined.

== Medalists ==
Medal	Name	Sport	Event	Date
Gold	Ilona Plecháčová	Biathlon	Women's individual	20 January
Silver	Czech Republic men's national under-16 ice hockey team	Ice hockey	Men's tournament	31 January
Bronze	Heda Mikolášová; Ilona Plecháčová; Jakub Neuhauser; Lukáš Kulhánek	Biathlon	Mixed relay	24 January
Bronze	Vanessa Volopichová	Snowboarding	Women's slopestyle	24 January

== Alpine skiing ==
The Czech Republic qualified three alpine skiers (one man and two women).

Men

Athlete	Event	Run 1		Run 2		Total	
Athlete	Event	Time	Rank	Time	Rank	Time	Rank
Stanislav Kovář	Super-G	—N/a				DNS	
Stanislav Kovář	Giant slalom	52.29	35	DNF		DNF	
Stanislav Kovář	Slalom	50.24	32	DNF		DNF	

Women

Athlete	Event	Run 1		Run 2		Total	
Athlete	Event	Time	Rank	Time	Rank	Time	Rank
Elena Drápalová	Super-G	—N/a				56.66	30
Elena Drápalová	Giant slalom	DNF		DNQ		DNF	
Elena Drápalová	Slalom	DNF		DNQ		DNF	
Elena Drápalová	Combined	59.20	31	57.30	25	1:56.50	24
Katrin Kudĕlásková	Super-G	—N/a				55.96	19
Katrin Kudĕlásková	Giant slalom	DNF		DNQ		DNF	
Katrin Kudĕlásková	Slalom	54.34	29	49.79	17	1:44.13	21
Katrin Kudĕlásková	Combined	57.32	10	54.87	22	1:52.19	20

== Biathlon ==
Men

Athlete	Event	Time	Misses	Rank
Jan Dufek	Sprint	24:27.2	3 (1+2)	44
Jan Dufek	Individual	48:43.9	7 (3+2+2+0)	49
František Jelínek	Individual	48:01.4	6 (0+2+2+2)	37
Lukáš Kulhánek	Sprint	23:17.0	2 (1+1)	18
Lukáš Kulhánek	Individual	49:03.2	9 (0+5+0+4)	53
Jakub Neuhauser	Sprint	25:11.5	5 (3+2)	61
Jakub Neuhauser	Individual	48:30.4	7 (1+2+3+2)	45

Women

Athlete	Event	Time	Misses	Rank
Lucie Jandurová	Sprint	23:07.9	5 (0+5)	33
Lucie Jandurová	Individual	40:37.9	3 (1+0+0+2)	13
Valerie Křížová	Sprint	22:08.5	5 (1+4)	22
Valerie Křížová	Individual	40:50.6	5 (1+0+2+2)	16
Heda Mikolášová	Sprint	21:05.7	5 (2+3)	4
Heda Mikolášová	Individual	38:23.8	4 (1+2+1+0)	4
Ilona Plecháčová	Sprint	21:07.5	4 (2+2)	5
Ilona Plecháčová	Individual	37:03.4	1 (0+1+0+0)	1st place, gold medalist(s)

Mixed

Athletes	Event	Time	Misses	Rank
Valerie Křížová, Jakub Neuhauser	Single mixed relay	47:13.8	1+16	8
Heda Mikolášová, Ilona Plecháčová, Jakub Neuhauser, Lukáš Kulhánek	Mixed relay	1:18:23.4	5+16	3rd place, bronze medalist(s)

== Cross-country skiing ==
Czech Republic qualified four cross-country skiers (two per gender).

Men

Athlete	Event	Qualification		Quarterfinal		Semifinal		Final	
Athlete	Event	Time	Rank	Time	Rank	Time	Rank	Time	Rank
Aleš Řezáč	7.5 km classical	—N/a						20:45.6	16
Aleš Řezáč	Sprint freestyle	3:09.86	21	4:13.12	6	Did not advance			28
Eduard Simbartl	7.5 km classical	—N/a						20:21.7	8
Eduard Simbartl	Sprint freestyle	3:11.84	25	3:12.76	4	Did not advance			19

Women

Athlete	Event	Qualification		Quarterfinal		Semifinal		Final	
Athlete	Event	Time	Rank	Time	Rank	Time	Rank	Time	Rank
Kateřina Dušková	7.5 km classical	—N/a						23:06.6	11
Kateřina Dušková	Sprint freestyle	3:38.39	11	3:39.77	2	3:38.77	2	3:43.52	5
Eliška Polonská	7.5 km classical	—N/a						23:42.7	21
Eliška Polonská	Sprint freestyle	3:38.92	13	3:37.70	4	Did not advance			16

Mixed

Athlete	Event	Time	Rank
Kateřina Dušková; Aleš Řezáč; Eliška Polonská; Eduard Simbartl	Mixed relay	55:41.4	10

== Curling ==
The Czech Republic qualified a mixed doubles pair for a total of two athletes (one per gender).

Summary

Team	Event	Group Stage						Quarterfinal	Semifinal	Final / BM	
Team	Event	Opposition Score	Opposition Score	Opposition Score	Opposition Score	Opposition Score	Rank	Opposition Score	Opposition Score	Opposition Score	Rank
Julie Zelingrová; Ondřej Bláha	Mixed doubles	Hungary; W 7–2	Nigeria; W 19–0	Great Britain; L 3–8	Canada; W 6–4	South Korea; W 7–5	2 Q	United States; L 7–8	Did not advance		8

=== Mixed doubles ===
Group A	W	L	W–L	DSC
Great Britain	4	1	1–0	40.06
Czech Republic	4	1	0–1	42.84
Canada	3	2	–	54.69
Hungary	2	3	1–0	89.06
South Korea	2	3	0–1	38.09
Nigeria	0	5	–	168.42

Round robin

Draw 2

Saturday, January 27, 10:00

Sheet B	1	2	3	4	5	6	7	8	Final
Czech Republic (Zelingrová / Bláha)	1	1	1	0	2	0	1	1	7
Hungary (Nagy / Kárász) 🔨	0	0	0	1	0	1	0	0	2

Draw 7

Sunday, January 28, 18:00

Sheet A	1	2	3	4	5	6	7	8	Final
Czech Republic (Zelingrová / Bláha) 🔨	1	3	5	2	4	4	X	X	19
Nigeria (Akinsanya / Daniel)	0	0	0	0	0	0	X	X	0

Draw 9

Monday, January 29, 14:00

Sheet B	1	2	3	4	5	6	7	8	Final
Great Britain (Soutar / Brewster) 🔨	0	0	0	1	1	1	1	4	8
Czech Republic (Zelingrová / Bláha)	1	1	1	0	0	0	0	0	3

Draw 11

Tuesday, January 30, 10:00

Sheet C	1	2	3	4	5	6	7	8	Final
Canada (Locke / Perry) 🔨	1	0	2	0	0	0	1	0	4
Czech Republic (Zelingrová / Bláha)	0	1	0	2	1	1	0	1	6

Draw 14

Wednesday, January 31, 9:00

Sheet D	1	2	3	4	5	6	7	8	Final
Czech Republic (Zelingrová / Bláha)	2	2	0	0	2	0	0	1	7
South Korea (Lee / Lee) 🔨	0	0	1	1	0	1	2	0	5

Quarterfinal

Wednesday, January 31, 19:00

Sheet C	1	2	3	4	5	6	7	8	Final
United States (Wendling / Paral) 🔨	1	0	0	0	2	1	0	4	8
Czech Republic (Zelingrová / Bláha)	0	1	1	1	0	0	4	0	7

== Figure skating ==
Athletes	Event	RD		FD		Total	
Athletes	Event	Points	Rank	Points	Rank	Points	Rank
Andrea Pšurná; Jáchym Novák	Ice dance	51.22	5	75.41	7	126.63	6
Klára Vlčková; Tomáš Vlček	Ice dance	33.09	12	49.24	12	82.33	12

== Freestyle skiing ==
Dual moguls

Athlete	Event	Group Heats		Round of 16	Quarterfinals	Semifinals	Final / BM	
Athlete	Event	Points	Rank	Opposition Result	Opposition Result	Opposition Result	Opposition Result	Rank
Vít Zvalený	Men's dual moguls	9	4			Did not advance		13
Zuzana Tlapáková	Women's dual moguls	9	4			Did not advance		14
Vít Zvalený; Zuzana Tlapáková	Mixed team dual moguls	—N/a		South Korea; L 10 – 60	Did not advance			14

Ski cross

Athlete	Event	Pre-heat	Group heats		Quarterfinal	Semifinal	Final	Final rank
Athlete	Event	Position	Points	Rank	Position	Position	Position	Final rank
Tomáš Matoušek	Men's ski cross	—N/a	14	8	—N/a	Did not advance		N/A
Jan Třešňák	Men's ski cross	—N/a	11	10	—N/a	Did not advance		N/A
Nela Apolínová	Women's ski cross	—N/a	16	4	—N/a	4	4 (in small final)	8
Aneta Koryntová	Women's ski cross	—N/a	11	10	—N/a	Did not advance		N/A
Tomáš Matoušek, Nela Apolínová	Team ski cross	1	—N/a		3	Did not advance		12
Jan Třešňák, Aneta Koryntová	Team ski cross	3	—N/a		Did not advance			N/A

Halfpipe, Slopestyle & Big Air

Athlete	Event	Qualification				Final				
Athlete	Event	Run 1	Run 2	Best	Rank	Run 1	Run 2	Run 3	Total	Rank
Petr Müller	Men's big air	92.50	~~71.00~~	92.50	1	19.75	~~42.50~~	65.25	85.00	10
Petr Müller	Men's slopestyle	86.75	~~80.00~~	86.75	4	~~65.50~~	67.75	~~59.75~~	67.75	5

== Ice hockey ==
Summary

Key:
- OT – Overtime
- GWS – Match decided by penalty-shootout

Team	Event	Group stage			Semifinal	Final	
Team	Event	Opposition Score	Opposition Score	Rank	Opposition Score	Opposition Score	Rank
Czech Republic men's	Men's tournament	Slovakia; W 3–2	United States; W 6–5 GWS	1	Finland; W 3–1	United States; L 0–4	2nd place, silver medalist(s)

=== Men's tournament ===
Team roster

- Šimon Bělohorský
- Jakub Daněk
- Jan Hrček
- David Huk
- Lukáš Kachlíř
- Šimon Katolický
- Adam Klaus
- Jan Láryš
- Václav Nedorost
- Filip Novák
- František Poletín
- Martin Psohlavec
- Ben Reisnecker
- Ondřej Ruml
- Tobiáš Sekanina
- Petr Tomek
- Jakub Vaněček
- Matěj Weiss

Group A

Pos	Team	Pld	W	SOW	SOL	L	GF	GA	GD	Pts	Qualification
1	Czech Republic	2	1	1	0	0	9	7	+2	5	Semifinals
2	United States	2	0	1	1	0	10	10	0	3	Semifinals
3	Slovakia	2	0	0	1	1	6	8	−2	1	

Source: Gangwon 2024

28 January 2024; 14:00	Czech Republic	3–2 (0–0, 0–0, 3–2)	Slovakia	Gangneung Hockey Centre; Attendance: 3,830

Game reference

Jan Láryš
Goalies
Dávid Dvořák
Referees:
(Canada) Mathieu Boudreau
(Norway) Oskar Øvstedal
Linesmen:
(Canada) Mitchell Gibbs
(Uzbekistan) David Prokofyev

	0–1	33:09 – Kubat (Plančár)
Katolický (Kachlíř, Novák) (PP) – 36:08	1–1
Katolický (Novák) – 37:06	2–1
Tomek (ENG) – 44:17	3–1
	3–2	44:34 – Kovalčík (Macák)

4.5 min
Penalties
4.5 min
36
Shots
24

29 January 2024; 14:00	United States	5–6 GWS (3–1, 2–2, 0–2) (SO: 0–1)	Czech Republic	Gangneung Hockey Centre; Attendance: 3,203

Game reference

Gavin Weeks
Goalies
Jan Láryš
Referees:
(Canada) Mathieu Boudreau
(Netherlands) Adler Steenstra
Linesmen:
(Canada) Mitchell Gibbs
(Uzbekistan) David Prokofyev

Barnett (Francisco, Marthaler) – 05:48	1–0
	1–1	08:39 – Katolický (Kachlíř, Tomek) (PP)
Berchild (Trottier) – 09:30	2–1
Stuart (Barnett) – 14:59	3–1
Schairer (Hurlbert, Berchild) – 20:45	4–1
	4–2	22:29 – Katolický (Tomek)
	4–3	25:57 – Ruml (Nedorost, Hanyš) (PP)
Hurlbert – 27:18	5–3
	5–4	37:26 – Novák (SH)
	5–5	42:49 – Novák (Tomek)

Hurlbert
Berchild (miss)
Francisco (miss)
Stuart (miss)
Bumgarner (miss)
Torre (miss)
Shootout
Katolický
(miss) Huk
(miss) Novák
(miss) Tomek
(miss) Kachlíř
Nedorost
7.5 min
Penalties
4.5 min
35
Shots
19

Semifinal

30 January 2024; 14:00	Czech Republic	3–1 (0–0, 3–0, 0–1)	Finland	Gangneung Hockey Centre; Attendance: 3,448

Game reference

Jan Láryš
Martin Psohlavec
Goalies
Pyry Lammi
Referees:
(Canada) Mathieu Boudreau
(Netherlands) Adler Steenstra
Linesmen:
(South Korea) Lim Jun-seo
(Uzbekistan) David Prokofyev

Nedorost (Ruml, Bělohorský) (PP2) – 17:14	1–0
Bělohorský (Reisnecker) – 19:06	2–0
Novák (Vaněček, Katolický) – 29:11	3–0
	3–1	34:32 – Kähkönen (Arkko, Torkki)

4.5 min
Penalties
7.5 min
33
Shots
25

Final

31 January 2024; 20:00	Czech Republic	0–4 (0–1, 0–1, 0–2)	United States	Gangneung Hockey Centre; Attendance: 4,646

Game reference

Jan Láryš
Goalies
Xavier Wendt
Referees:
(Denmark) Rasmus Ankersen
(Canada) Mathieu Boudreau
Linesmen:
(Canada) Mitchell Gibbs
(Czech Republic) David Thuma

0–1	08:39 – Berchild (Francisco, Torre) (PP)
0–2	21:04 – Hurlbert (Stuart)
0–3	40:09 – Berchild (Trottier, Hurlbert)
0–4	43:25 – Torre (Berchild, Hurlbert) (PP)

4.5 min
Penalties
1.5 min
29
Shots
23

== Luge ==
Czech Republic qualified three male lugers.

Men

Athlete	Event	Run 1		Run 2		Total	
Athlete	Event	Time	Rank	Time	Rank	Time	Rank
Filip Pavlata	Singles	48.133	16	48.442	18	1:36.575	17
David Svárovský; Štefan Janák	Doubles	50.167	9	50.395	10	1:40.562	9

== Nordic combined ==
Individual

Athlete	Event	Ski jumping				Cross-country	
Athlete	Event	Distance	Points	Rank	Deficit	Time	Rank
Lukáš Doležal	Men's normal hill/6 km	102.0	124.7	8	+1:05	14:23.8	6
Jan Kabeláč	Men's normal hill/6 km	78.5	67.0	27	+4:56	18:24.6	26
Karolína Horká	Women's normal hill/4 km	50.0	4.1	21	+8:37	18:30.1	20
Natálie Nejedlová	Women's normal hill/4 km	73.0	57.5	20	+5:03	19:36.9	21

Team

Athlete	Event	Ski jumping			Cross-country	
Athlete	Event	Points	Rank	Deficit	Time	Rank
Lukáš Doležal; Karolína Horká; Natálie Nejedlová; Jan Kabeláč	Mixed team	242.9	10	+3:26	39:34.7	10

== Short track speed skating ==
Women

Athlete	Event	Heats		Quarterfinal		Semifinal		Final	
Athlete	Event	Time	Rank	Time	Rank	Time	Rank	Time	Rank
Eva Bláhová	500 m	47.996	3	Did not advance					25
Eva Bláhová	1000 m	1:40.187	3	Did not advance					25
Eva Bláhová	1500 m	—N/a		2:45.156	4	Did not advance			24

== Ski jumping ==
Czech Republic qualified four ski jumpers (two per gender).

Individual

Athlete	Event	First round			Final			Total	
Athlete	Event	Distance	Points	Rank	Distance	Points	Rank	Points	Rank
Josef Buchar	Men's normal hill	89.0	81.4	19	91.0	79.5	18	160.9	16
Daniel Škarka	Men's normal hill	90.0	85.5	15	96.0	92.8	11	178.3	13
Anežka Indráčková	Women's normal hill	97.0	95.4	4	102.0	101.9	4	197.3	4
Natálie Nejedlová	Women's normal hill	60.5	17.3	29	66.5	29.9	26	47.2	28

Team

Athlete	Event	First round				Final				Total	
Athlete	Event	Distance	Points	Team points	Rank	Distance	Points	Team points	Rank	Points	Rank
Natálie Nejedlová, Josef Buchar, Anežka Indráčková, Daniel Škarka	Mixed team	66.0; 96.0; 98.0; 90.0	28.1; 97.9; 96.0; 88.5	310.5	8	60.0; 93.0; 96.5; 95.0	23.8; 93.9; 103.3; 98.3	319.3	8	629.8	8

== Snowboarding ==
Snowboard cross

Athlete	Event	Heats		Quarterfinal	Semifinal	Final
Athlete	Event	Points	Position	Position	Position	Position
Max Benáčan	Men's snowboard cross	9	12	—N/a	Did not advance	
Štěpán Hlaváček	Men's snowboard cross	12	10	—N/a	Did not advance	
Karolína Hrušová	Women's snowboard cross	17	4	—N/a	Did not advance	
Karolína Šperlová	Women's snowboard cross	5	11	—N/a	4	6 (2nd in small final)
Štěpán Hlaváček; Karolína Hrušová	Team snowboard cross	—N/a		2	DNF	6 (2nd in small final)

Halfpipe, Slopestyle & Big Air

Athlete	Event	Qualification				Final				
Athlete	Event	Run 1	Run 2	Best	Rank	Run 1	Run 2	Run 3	Total	Rank
Vanessa Volopichová	Women's big air	72.00	~~71.75~~	72.00	10	~~69.25~~	78.50	72.00	150.50	5
Vanessa Volopichová	Women's slopestyle	~~32.00~~	61.75	61.75	7	~~64.25~~	87.00	~~35.75~~	87.00	3rd place, bronze medalist(s)

== See also ==
- Czech Republic at the 2024 Summer Olympics
