= Umeka Odaira =

Japanese ice hockey player (born 2008)

- Born: December 12, 2008 (age 17) Tochigi, Japan
- Height: 1.62 m (5 ft 4 in)
- Weight: 55 kg (121 lb; 8 st 9 lb)
- Position: Forward
- Shoots: Left
- National team: Japan

Umeka Odaira (born December 12, 2008) is a Japanese ice hockey player. She is a member of the Japanese women's national ice hockey team. She participated in women's ice hockey tournament at the 2026 Winter Olympics.

== Playing career ==
=== International ===
Making her Olympic debut on February 6, Japan opposed France. Wearing number 91, Odaira logged 2:48 of ice time.

She was one of 17 teenagers that played in women's ice hockey at the 2026 Winter Olympics.
