= Italy at the European Youth Olympic Festival =

- IOC code: ITA
- NOC: Italian Olympic Committee
- Website: coni.it (in Italian)
- Medals: Gold 190 Silver 178 Bronze 191 Total 559

Italy first participated at the European Youth Olympic Festival at the 1991 Summer Festival and has earned medals at both summer and winter festivals.

== Medal tables ==
=== Medals by Summer Youth Olympic Festival ===
Games	Athletes	Gold	Silver	Bronze	Total	Rank
(Belgium) 1991 Brussels		8	6	8	22	4
(Netherlands) 1993 Valkenswaard		8	6	8	22	3
(United Kingdom) 1995 Bath		2	4	3	9	8
(Portugal) 1997 Lisbon		4	6	6	16	6
(Denmark) 1999 Esbjerg		2	8	6	16	12
(Spain) 2001 Murcia		4	6	9	19	5
(France) 2003 Paris		5	4	4	16	6
(Italy) 2005 Lignano Sabbiadoro		14	8	14	36	2
(Serbia) 2007 Belgrade		9	7	6	22	3
(Finland) 2009 Tampere		8	7	7	22	6
(Turkey) 2011 Trabzon		7	12	12	31	4
(Netherlands) 2013 Utrecht		7	3	12	22	5
(Georgia (country)) 2015 Tbilisi	104	12	2	10	23	2
(Hungary) 2017 Győr		14	11	13	38	2
(Azerbaijan) 2019 Baku		8	9	9	26	5
(Slovakia) 2022 Banská Bystrica	96	21	12	14	47	1
(Slovenia) 2023 Koper	99	16	18	12	46	1
(Czech Republic) 2025 Brno
Total		149	127	153	429	3

=== Medals by Winter Youth Olympic Festival ===
Games	Athletes	Gold	Silver	Bronze	Total	Rank
(Italy) 1993 Aosta		4	2	3	9	2
1995 Andorra la Vella		4	5	2	11	1
(Sweden) 1997 Sundsvall		6	5	2	12	3
(Slovakia) 1999 Poprad-Tatry		3	1	1	5	4
(Finland) 2001 Vuokatti		3	2	3	8	3
(Slovenia) 2003 Bled		0	1	2	3	11
(Switzerland) 2005 Monthey		2	6	0	8	8
(Spain) 2007 Jaca		1	1	1	3	9
(Poland) 2009 Silesian Voivodeship		0	0	0	0	—
(Czech Republic) 2011 Liberec	42	2	3	1	6	5
(Romania) 2013 Braşov		2	4	2	8	6
(Austria) / 2015 Vorarlberg / Liechtenstein	35	0	1	0	1	13
(Turkey) 2017 Erzurum	10	2	1	6	9	4
(Bosnia and Herzegovina) 2019 Sarajevo / Istočno Sarajevo	38	1	3	1	5	10
(Finland) 2022 Vuokatti	39	3	4	2	9	2
(Italy) 2023 Friuli-Venezia Giulia	109	6	8	7	21	2
(Georgia (country)) 2025 Bakuriani
Total		41	51	38	130	3

== See also ==
- Italy at the Youth Olympics
- Italy at the Olympics
