= Ukraine at the European Youth Olympic Festival =

- IOC code: UKR
- NOC: National Olympic Committee of Ukraine
- Website: noc-ukr.org (in Ukrainian)

Other related appearances
- Soviet Union (1991)

Ukraine first participated at the European Youth Olympic Festival in 1993 and has earned medals at both summer and winter festivals.

In 1991, when Ukrainian athletes competed as members of the Soviet team, Yuriy Bilonoh (athletics) won gold and Serguei Sokolovsky (table tennis) won silver.

== Medal tables ==
=== Medals by Summer Youth Olympic Festival ===
Games	Athletes	Gold	Silver	Bronze	Total	Rank
(Belgium) 1991 Brussels	As part of Soviet Union (URS)					
(Netherlands) 1993 Valkenswaard		5	5	8	18	7
(United Kingdom) 1995 Bath		3	4	8	15	7
(Portugal) 1997 Lisbon		11	5	6	22	2
(Denmark) 1999 Esbjerg		2	3	5	11	13
(Spain) 2001 Murcia	30	4	1	3	8	8
(France) 2003 Paris		5	5	7	17	5
(Italy) 2005 Lignano Sabbiadoro	74	4	6	3	13	7
(Serbia) 2007 Belgrade	76	8	6	4	18	5
(Finland) 2009 Tampere	65	2	3	8	13	12
(Turkey) 2011 Trabzon	53	8	4	3	15	3
(Netherlands) 2013 Utrecht	60	0	6	8	14	30
(Georgia (country)) 2015 Tbilisi	48	3	7	1	11	12
(Hungary) 2017 Győr	44	3	4	1	8	13
(Azerbaijan) 2019 Baku	68	8	7	10	25	6
(Slovakia) 2022 Banská Bystrica	46	6	6	6	18	7
(Slovenia) 2023 Maribor	56	1	5	6	12	23
(North Macedonia) 2025 Skopje	78	5	8	10	23	11
(Italy) 2027 Lignano Sabbiadoro	Future event					
(Belgium) 2029 Flanders	Future event					
(Latvia) 2031 Liepāja	Future event					
Total		78	87	95	261	8

=== Medals by Winter Youth Olympic Festival ===
Games	Athletes	Gold	Silver	Bronze	Total	Rank
(Italy) 1993 Aosta		0	2	0	2	10
1995 Andorra la Vella		0	1	0	1	11
(Sweden) 1997 Sundsvall		0	0	2	2	14
(Slovakia) 1999 Poprad-Tatry		0	1	0	1	15
(Finland) 2001 Vuokatti		0	0	0	0	–
(Slovenia) 2003 Bled		0	0	1	1	14
(Switzerland) 2005 Monthey		0	0	2	2	16
(Spain) 2007 Jaca		0	0	0	0	–
(Poland) 2009 Silesia		0	2	0	2	12
(Czech Republic) 2011 Liberec	38	0	0	0	0	–
(Romania) 2013 Braşov	31	1	1	1	3	10
(Austria) / 2015 Vorarlberg-Liechtenstein	21	1	0	0	1	9
(Turkey) 2017 Erzurum	25	0	3	0	3	10
(Bosnia and Herzegovina) 2019 Sarajevo-East Sarajevo	23	0	0	2	2	20
(Finland) 2022 Vuokatti	24	0	0	0	0	–
(Italy) 2023 Friuli-Venezia Giulia	27	1	0	2	3	15
(Georgia (country)) 2025 Borjomi-Bakuriani	48	3	0	2	5	=4
(Romania) 2027 Braşov	Future events					
Total		6	10	13	29	17

=== Medals by summer sport ===
As of 2025.

Sport	Gold	Silver	Bronze	Total
Athletics	28	29	19	76
Gymnastics	20	16	14	50
Judo	18	16	31	65
Swimming	9	18	22	49
Canoeing	1	1	2	4
Cycling	1	1	0	2
Tennis	1	0	0	1
Taekwondo	0	2	1	3
Volleyball	0	2	0	2
Wrestling	0	1	3	4
Shooting	0	1	1	2
Table tennis	0	0	3	3
Totals (12 entries)	78	87	96	261

=== Medals by winter sport ===
As of 2025.

Sport	Gold	Silver	Bronze	Total
Biathlon	3	1	4	8
Figure skating	2	7	5	14
Short track speed skating	1	1	3	5
Snowboarding	0	1	0	1
Freestyle skiing	0	0	1	1
Totals (5 entries)	6	10	13	29

== See also ==
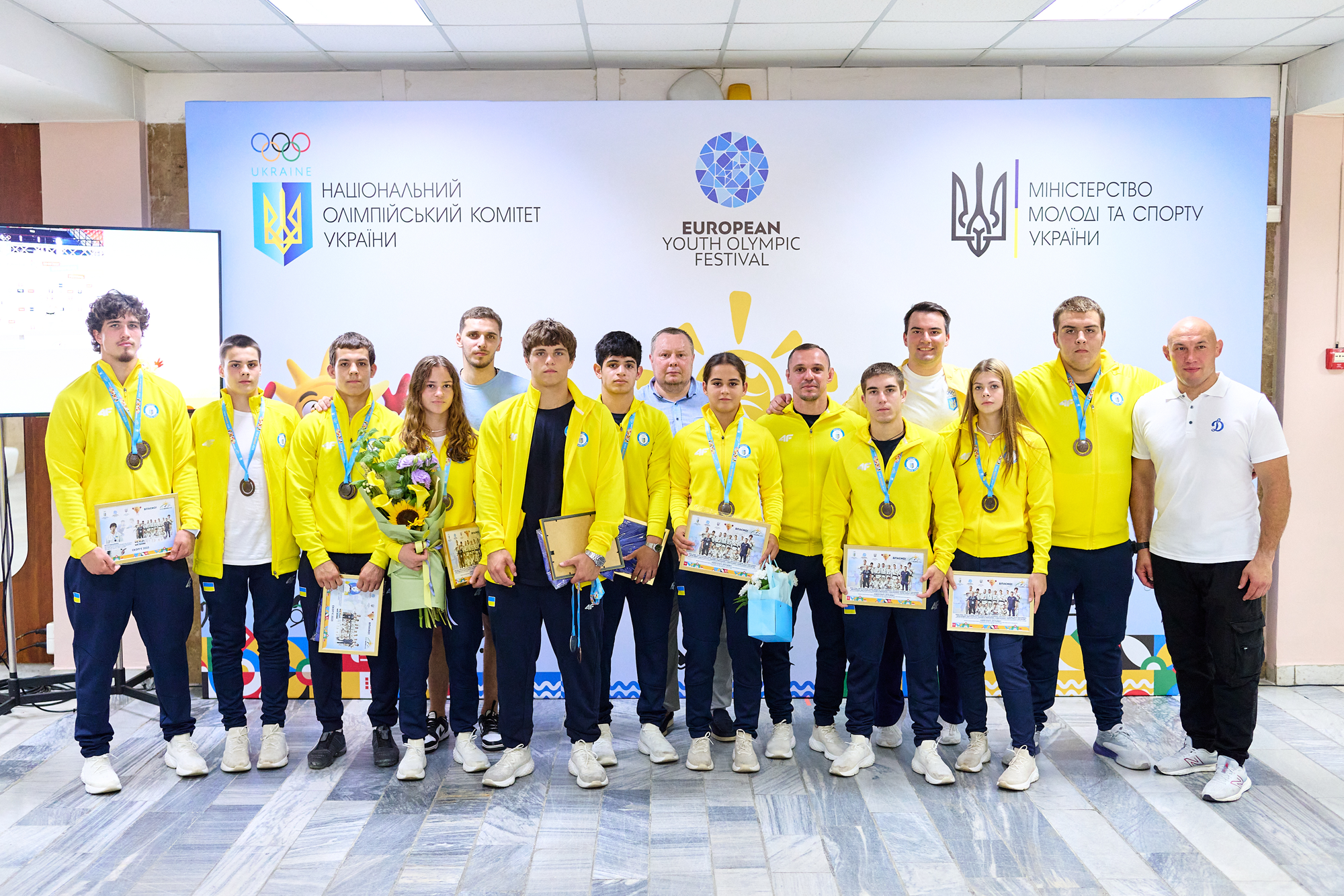
Team Ukraine upon returning after competing at the 2025 European Youth Summer Olympic Festival

- Ukraine at the Youth Olympics
- Ukraine at the Olympics
