= Russia at the European Youth Olympic Festival =

- IOC code: RUS
- NOC: Russian Olympic Committee
- Website: olympic.ru (in Russian)
- Medals: Gold 369 Silver 241 Bronze 198 Total 808

Other related appearances
- Soviet Union (1991)

Russia first participated at the European Youth Olympic Festival at the 1993 Winter Festival and has earned medals at both summer and winter festivals.

== Medal tables ==
=== Medals by Summer Youth Olympic Festival ===
Games	Athletes	Gold	Silver	Bronze	Total	Rank
(Belgium) 1991 Brussels	As part of the Soviet Union (URS)					
(Netherlands) 1993 Valkenswaard		9	10	6	25	1
(United Kingdom) 1995 Bath		12	8	7	27	2
(Portugal) 1997 Lisbon		18	13	11	42	1
(Denmark) 1999 Esbjerg		19	12	4	35	1
(Spain) 2001 Murcia		19	15	5	39	1
(France) 2003 Paris		18	10	16	44	1
(Italy) 2005 Lignano Sabbiadoro		15	16	12	43	1
(Serbia) 2007 Belgrade		18	6	8	32	1
(Finland) 2009 Tampere		18	10	8	36	1
(Turkey) 2011 Trabzon		21	17	16	54	1
(Netherlands) 2013 Utrecht		30	14	12	56	1
(Georgia (country)) 2015 Tbilisi	119	17	9	11	37	1
(Hungary) 2017 Győr	156	30	19	12	61	1
(Azerbaijan) 2019 Baku	108	28	16	21	65	1
(Slovakia) 2022 Banská Bystrica	Did not participate					
(Slovenia) 2023 Maribor	Did not participate					
(North Macedonia) 2025 Skopje	Did not participate					
Total		272	175	149	596	1

=== Medals by Winter Youth Olympic Festival ===
Games	Athletes	Gold	Silver	Bronze	Total	Rank
(Italy) 1993 Aosta		5	5	0	10	1
1995 Andorra la Vella		2	2	2	6	3
(Sweden) 1997 Sundsvall		7	5	3	15	1
(Slovakia) 1999 Poprad-Tatry		9	6	3	18	1
(Finland) 2001 Vuokatti		11	3	2	16	1
(Slovenia) 2003 Bled		9	5	1	15	1
(Switzerland) 2005 Monthey		5	4	4	13	1
(Spain) 2007 Jaca		4	3	4	11	1
(Poland) 2009 Silesian Voivodeship		5	2	4	11	1
(Czech Republic) 2011 Liberec		2	2	4	8	6
(Romania) 2013 Braşov		11	7	4	22	1
(Austria) / 2015 Vorarlberg / Liechtenstein	66	6	6	4	16	1
(Turkey) 2017 Erzurum	74	19	9	11	39	1
(Bosnia and Herzegovina) 2019 Sarajevo / Istočno Sarajevo	61	2	7	3	12	6
(Finland) 2022 Vuokatti	12	0	0	1	1	19
(Italy) 2023 Friuli-Venezia Giulia	Did not participate					
(Georgia (country)) 2025 Bakuriani	Did not participate					
Total		97	66	50	213	1

== See also ==
- Russia at the Youth Olympics
- Russia at the Olympics
