= Great Britain at the European Youth Olympic Festival =

- IOC code: GBR
- NOC: British Olympic Association
- Medals Ranked 2nd: Gold 158 Silver 123 Bronze 130 Total 411

The United Kingdom of Great Britain and Northern Ireland, competing under the name Great Britain first participated at the European Youth Olympic Festival at the 1991 Summer Festival and has earned medals at both summer and winter festivals.

== Medal tables ==
=== Medals by Summer Youth Olympic Festival ===
Games	Athletes	Gold	Silver	Bronze	Total	Rank
(Belgium) 1991 Brussels		10	9	10	29	3
(Netherlands) 1993 Valkenswaard		5	7	9	21	6
(United Kingdom) 1995 Bath		24	10	8	42	1
(Portugal) 1997 Lisbon		10	2	11	23	3
(Denmark) 1999 Esbjerg		7	9	5	21	3
(Spain) 2001 Murcia		9	10	9	28	2
(France) 2003 Paris		6	6	11	23	4
(Italy) 2005 Lignano Sabbiadoro		13	5	5	23	3
(Serbia) 2007 Belgrade		9	7	8	24	2
(Finland) 2009 Tampere		10	6	9	25	3
(Turkey) 2011 Trabzon		17	10	6	33	2
(Netherlands) 2013 Utrecht		9	14	8	31	2
(Georgia (country)) 2015 Tbilisi	44	4	8	8	20	7
(Hungary) 2017 Győr		3	1	6	10	16
(Azerbaijan) 2019 Baku	45	11	12	2	25	2
(Slovakia) 2022 Banská Bystrica	40	7	5	6	18	4
(Slovenia) 2023 Maribor	Future event					
Total		154	121	121	396	2

=== Medals by Winter Youth Olympic Festival ===
Games	Athletes	Gold	Silver	Bronze	Total	Rank
(Italy) 1993 Aosta		0	0	1	1	16
1995 Andorra la Vella		0	0	1	1	14
(Sweden) 1997 Sundsvall		0	0	1	1	15
(Slovakia) 1999 Poprad-Tatry		0	1	2	3	13
(Finland) 2001 Vuokatti		0	0	0	0	–
(Slovenia) 2003 Bled		0	0	0	0	–
(Switzerland) 2005 Monthey		1	0	1	2	11
(Spain) 2007 Jaca		0	0	0	0	–
(Poland) 2009 Silesian Voivodeship		1	1	0	2	11
(Czech Republic) 2011 Liberec		0	0	0	0	-
(Romania) 2013 Braşov	10	0	1	0	1	14
(Austria) / 2015 Vorarlberg and Liechtenstein		0	0	0	0	–
(Turkey) 2017 Erzurum	16	0	0	1	1	16
(Bosnia and Herzegovina) 2019 Sarajevo & Istočno Sarajevo	27	1	0	1	2	11
(Finland) 2022 Vuokatti	Future events					
(Italy) 2023 Friuli-Venezia Giulia	Future events					
Total		4	2	9	15	6

== See also ==
- Great Britain at the Olympics
- Great Britain at the Youth Olympics
- Great Britain at the Paralympics
- Great Britain at the European Games
