= Bosnia and Herzegovina at the European Youth Olympic Festival =

- IOC code: BIH
- NOC: Olympic Committee of Bosnia and Herzegovina
- Website: www.okbih.ba (in Bosnian)
- Medals: Gold 1 Silver 2 Bronze 2 Total 5

Bosnia and Herzegovina first participated at the European Youth Olympic Festival at the 1995 Winter Festival and has earned medals at both summer and winter festivals. Bosnia and Herzegovina hosted the 2019 Winter Festival.

== Medal tables ==
=== Medals by Summer Youth Olympic Festival ===
Games	Athletes	Gold	Silver	Bronze	Total	Rank
(Belgium) 1991 Brussels	Did not participate					
(Netherlands) 1993 Valkenswaard	Did not participate					
(United Kingdom) 1995 Bath	11	0	0	0	0	–
(Portugal) 1997 Lisbon	9	0	0	0	0	–
(Denmark) 1999 Esbjerg		0	0	0	0	–
(Spain) 2001 Murcia	5	0	0	0	0	–
(France) 2003 Paris	12	0	0	0	0	–
(Italy) 2005 Lignano Sabbiadoro	13	0	0	0	0	–
(Serbia) 2007 Belgrade	35	0	1	0	1	34
(Finland) 2009 Tampere	17	0	0	0	0	–
(Turkey) 2011 Trabzon	8	0	0	1	1	33
(Netherlands) 2013 Utrecht	4	0	1	1	2	35
(Georgia (country)) 2015 Tbilisi	25	1	0	0	1	30
(Hungary) 2017 Győr	24	0	0	0	0	–
(Azerbaijan) 2019 Baku		0	0	0	0	-
(Slovakia) 2021 Banská Bystrica		0	0	1	1	
(Slovenia) 2023 Maribor	Future event					
Total		1	2	3	6	

=== Medals by Winter Youth Olympic Festival ===
Games	Athletes	Gold	Silver	Bronze	Total	Rank
(Italy) 1993 Aosta	Did not participate					
1995 Andorra la Vella	1	0	0	0	0	–
(Sweden) 1997 Sundsvall	3	0	0	0	0	–
(Slovakia) 1999 Poprad-Tatry	4	0	0	0	0	–
(Finland) 2001 Vuokatti	Did not participate					
(Slovenia) 2003 Bled	4	0	0	0	0	–
(Switzerland) 2005 Monthey	Did not participate					
(Spain) 2007 Jaca	3	0	0	0	0	–
(Poland) 2009 Silesian Voivodeship	11	0	0	0	0	–
(Czech Republic) 2011 Liberec	9	0	0	0	0	–
(Romania) 2013 Braşov	3	0	0	0	0	–
(Austria) / 2015 Vorarlberg and Liechtenstein	7	0	0	0	0	–
(Turkey) 2017 Erzurum	6	0	0	0	0	–
(Bosnia and Herzegovina) 2019 Sarajevo & Istočno Sarajevo	21	0	0	0	0	–
(Finland) 2021 Vuokatti	Future events					
(Italy) 2023 Friuli-Venezia Giulia	Future events					
Total		0	0	0	0	–

=== Medals by summer sport ===
Sport	Gold	Silver	Bronze	Total
Basketball	1	0	0	1
Judo	0	2	1	3
Shooting	0	1	0	1
Athletics	0	0	1	1
Totals (4 entries)	1	3	2	6

== List of medalists ==
=== Summer Festivals ===
Medal	Name	Games	Sport	Event
Silver	Đorđe Kisin	2007 Serbia	Judo	Boys' 81 kg
Bronze	Mesud Pezer	(Turkey) 2011 Trabzon	Athletics	Boys' shot put
Silver	Petar Zadro	(Netherlands) 2013 Utrecht	Judo	Boys' 66 kg
Bronze	Aleksandra Samardžić	(Netherlands) 2013 Utrecht	Judo	Girls' 70 kg
Gold	Boys' basketball team: Džanan Musa Njegoš Sikiraš Lazar Mutić Emir Čerkezović Sani Čampara Srđan Kočić Amar Barukčija Vedran Mirković Timur Ovčina Aljoša Janković Adi Alikadić Nikola Đaković	(Georgia (country)) 2015 Tbilisi	Basketball	Boys' tournament

== See also ==
- Bosnia and Herzegovina at the Olympics
- Bosnia and Herzegovina at the Paralympics
- Bosnia and Herzegovina at the European Games
