= Belgium at the European Youth Olympic Festival =

- IOC code: BEL
- NOC: Belgian Olympic Committee
- Website: www.olympic.be (in Dutch and French)
- Medals: Gold 41 Silver 45 Bronze 64 Total 150

Belgium first participated in the European Youth Olympic Festival at the 1991 Summer Festival and has earned medals at both summer and winter festivals.

== Medal tables ==
=== Medals by Summer Youth Olympic Festival ===
Games	Athletes	Gold	Silver	Bronze	Total	Rank
(Belgium) 1991 Brussels		1	3	10	14	12
(Netherlands) 1993 Valkenswaard		4	1	4	9	11
(United Kingdom) 1995 Bath		2	4	1	7	10
(Portugal) 1997 Lisbon		2	1	8	11	13
(Denmark) 1999 Esbjerg		1	1	2	4	20
(Spain) 2001 Murcia		0	5	6	11	28
(France) 2003 Paris		3	3	0	6	10
(Italy) 2005 Lignano Sabbiadoro	61	4	1	6	11	9
(Serbia) 2007 Belgrade	57	4	3	3	10	7
(Finland) 2009 Tampere		9	5	4	18	4
(Turkey) 2011 Trabzon	82	2	5	8	15	13
(Netherlands) 2013 Utrecht		1	4	2	7	19
(Georgia (country)) 2015 Tbilisi	77	2	6	5	13	13
(Hungary) 2017 Győr		5	0	2	7	9
(Azerbaijan) 2019 Baku		0	5	2	7	29
(Slovakia) 2021 Košice	Future event					
Total		40	47	63	150	

=== Medals by Winter Youth Olympic Festival ===
Games	Athletes	Gold	Silver	Bronze	Total	Rank
(Italy) 1993 Aosta		1	1	0	2	
1995 Andorra la Vella		0	0	0	0	–
(Sweden) 1997 Sundsvall		0	0	0	0	–
(Slovakia) 1999 Poprad-Tatry		0	0	2	2	
(Finland) 2001 Vuokatti		0	0	0	0	–
(Slovenia) 2003 Bled		0	0	0	0	–
(Switzerland) 2005 Monthey		0	0	0	0	–
(Spain) 2007 Jaca		0	0	0	0	–
(Poland) 2009 Silesian Voivodeship		0	0	0	0	–
(Czech Republic) 2011 Liberec	2	0	1	0	1	13
(Romania) 2013 Braşov		0	0	0	0	–
(Austria) / 2015 Vorarlberg and Liechtenstein		0	0	1	1	16
(Turkey) 2017 Erzurum	Did not participate					
(Bosnia and Herzegovina) 2019 Sarajevo and Istočno Sarajevo	16	0	1	0	1	–
(Finland) 2021 Vuokatti	Future events					
(Italy) 2023 Friuli-Venezia Giulia	Future events					
Total		1	3	3	7	

=== Medals by summer sport ===
Sport	Gold	Silver	Bronze	Total
Athletics	17	22	22	61
Judo	6	6	18	30
Cycling	4	2	2	8
Swimming	4	1	4	9
Gymnastics	3	5	4	12
Tennis	2	3	8	13
Basketball	1	2	1	4
Table tennis	1	1	0	2
Volleyball	1	0	2	3
Sailing	1	0	0	1
Totals (10 entries)	40	42	61	143

=== Medals by winter sport ===
Sport	Gold	Silver	Bronze	Total
Short track speed skating	1	1	2	4
Figure skating	0	1	0	1
Ice hockey	0	1	0	1
Alpine skiing	0	0	1	1
Totals (4 entries)	1	3	3	7

== List of medalists ==
Source:

== Athletics (14-20-21) ==
(gold) Yassin Guellet: boys' long jump (1991)
(silver) Richard Braibant: boys' 200m (1991)
(bronze) Fabien Rase: boys' 110m hurdles (1991)
(bronze) Sandra Stals: girls' 400m (1991)
(bronze) Sabrina De Leeuw: girls' high jump (1991)
(bronze) Veerle Blondeel: girls' shot put (1991)
(gold) Patrick De Clercq: boys' 200m (1993)
(silver) Gunter Methot: boys' 1500m (1993)
(bronze) Ine Claus: girls' 1500m (1993)
(gold) Kim Gevaert: girls' 200m (1995)
(silver) Sylvie-Anne Elsouch: girls' 400m (1995)
(gold) Ludivine Michel: girls' 800m (1997)
(bronze) Rudy Colabela: boys' 100m (1997)
(bronze) Geert Waelput: boys' 800m (1997)
(bronze) ?? Oonen: 1500m (1997)
(gold) Mieke Geens: girls' 800m (1999)
(silver) Ellen Cochuyt: girls' high jump (1999)
(bronze) Kevin Rans: boys' pole vault (1999)
(bronze) Xenia Luxem: girls' 3000m (1999)
(silver) Joris De Vulder: boys' 1500m (2001)
(silver) Leen Vandeweege: girls' 1500m (2001)
(silver) Anne Leroy: girls' pole vault (2001)
(silver) Sofie Schoenmakers: girls' javelin (2001)
(bronze) Stijn Stroobants: boys' high jump (2001)
(bronze) Kirsten Hendriks: girls' 400m hurdles (2001)
(bronze) Inge Vangeel: girls' discus throw (2001)
(silver) Olivia Borlée: girls' 100m (2003)
(silver) Olivia Borlée: girls' 200m (2003)
(gold) Arnaud Ghislain: boys' 400m (2005)
(bronze) Hannelore Desmet: girls' high jump (2005)
(gold) Dieter Vanstreels: boys' 3000m (2007)
(gold) Andreas Van Ham: boys' 2000m steeple (2007)
(silver) Lucie Cicinatis: girls' 110m hurdles (2007)
(bronze) Els De Wael: girls' long jump (2007)
(gold) Julien Watrin: boys' 200m (2009)
(gold) Stef Vanhaeren: boys' 400m hurdles (2009)
(gold) Arnaud Art: boys' pole vault (2009)
(gold) Sofie Gallein: girls' 2000m steeple (2009)
(silver) Julien Watrin: boys' 100m (2009)
(silver) Imke Vervaet: girls' 200m (2009)
(bronze) Frederik Claes, Rodric Seutin, Stef Vanhaeren & Julien Watrin: boys' 4x100m (2009)
(bronze) Aurélie De Ryck: girls' pole vault (2009)
(gold) Brecht Bertels: boys' 800m (2011)
(silver) Justien Grillet: girls' 200m (2011)
(silver) Kimberley Efonye: girls' 400m (2011)
(silver) Camilla De Bleecker: girls' 800m (2011)
(silver) Depuydt-Efonye-Grillet-Missinne: girls' 4x100m (2011)
(bronze) Thomas Durant: boys' 4x100m hurdles (2011)
(bronze) Broothaerts-Diallo-Bram Luycx-Lorijn Verbrugghe: boys' 4x100m (2011)
(gold) Alexander Doom, Boys' 400m (2013)
(silver) Chloë Beaucarne, Girls' 100m hurdles (2013)
(silver) Lotte Scheldeman, Girls' 800m (2013)
(silver) Hanne Maudens, Girls' Long jump (2013)
(bronze) Beaucarne-Couckuyt-Depuydt-Dillens-Lobbens-Van Lancker, Girl's 4x100m (2013)

== Judo (5-6-18) ==
(silver) Thierry Peersmans: boys' -60kg (1991)
(silver) Bart Terrijn: boys' -78kg (1991)
(bronze) Cédric Taymans: boys' -45kg (1991)
(bronze) Carine Verdick: girls' -52kg (1991)
(bronze) Vicky Bellon: girls' -56kg (1991)
(bronze) Nancy Snoeck: girls' -62kg (1991)
(gold) Kristel Taelman: girls' -52kg (1993)
(bronze) Ingrid Herman: girls' -56kg (1993)
(bronze) Catherine Jacques: girls' -66kg (1993)
(gold) An Simons: girls' -44kg (1995)
(silver) Sven Boonen: boys' -55kg (1995)
(bronze) Brigitte Olivier: girls' +61kg (1995)
(silver) Miguel Toril Garcia: boys' -65kg (1997)
(bronze) Mehmet Üygin: boys' -60kg (1997)
(bronze) Marie-Elisabeth Veys: girls' +66kg (1997)
(bronze) Jennifer Espinosa Perez: girls' -44kg (2001)
(bronze) Laurie Luisi: girls' +70kg (2001)
(gold) Julie Baeyens: girls' -57kg (2003)
(silver) Thorgal Auspert: boys' -81kg (2005)
(bronze) Tatjana Van Steendam: girls' -44kg (2005)
(bronze) Maud Gudelj: girls' -63kg (2007)
(gold) Toma Nikiforov: boys' -90kg (2009)
(gold) Lola Mansour: girls' -70kg (2009)
(bronze) Lise Luyckfasseel: girls' -63kg (2009)
(bronze) Karim Maekelberg: boys' -50kg (2011)
(bronze) Kenzo Breda: boys' -73kg (2011)
(bronze) Evi Vermandere: girls' -44kg (2011)
(silver) Jorre Verstraeten: boys' -50kg (2013)
(bronze) Sophie Berger: girls' -70kg (2013)

== Swimming (4-1-3) ==
(bronze) Nina Van Koeckhoven: girls' 200m freestyle (1997)
(gold) Jorina Aerents: girls' 100m freestyle (2003)
(silver) Jorina Aerents: girls' 50m freestyle (2003)
(gold) Yoris Grandjean: boys' 50m freestyle (2005)
(gold) Yoris Grandjean: boys' 100m freestyle (2005)
(gold) Yoris Grandjean: boys' 200m freestyle (2005)
(bronze) Yoris Grandjean: boys' 100m Butterfly (2005)
(bronze) Jasper Aerents, Mattias De Geeter, Dieter Dekoninck & Axel Vandevelde, Boys' 4x100m freestyle (2007)

== Cycling (3-2-2) ==
(gold) Bruno Schoonbroodt: boys' road race (1993)
(gold) Steven Van Malderghem: boys' criterium (1993)
(bronze) Tom Loysch: boys' road race (1997)
(gold) Thomas Seghers: boys' criterium (2003)
(bronze) Frédérique Robert: boys' criterium (2005)
(silver) Jochen Deweer: boys' road race (2007)
(silver) Dries Verstrepen: boys' time trial (2011)

== Tennis (2-3-7) ==
(bronze) Laurence Courtois: girls' single (1991)
(bronze) Caroline Leens: girls' single (1993)
(silver) Justine Henin: girls' single (1995)
(silver) Justine Henin & Renaud Thys: mixed doubles (1995)
(bronze) Kirsten Flipkens: girls' single (2001)
(bronze) Frédéric De Fays: boys' single (2005)
(bronze) Aude Vermoezen: girls' single (2005)
(gold) An-Sophie Mestach: girls' single (2009)
(gold) Elke Lemmens & An-Sophie Mestach: girls' doubles (2009)
(silver) Julien Cagnina: boys' single (2009)
(bronze) Clément Geens: boys' single (2011)
(bronze) Clément Geens & Omer Salman: boys' doubles (2011)

== Gymnastics (1-2-1) ==
(silver) Aagje Vanwalleghem: girls' uneven bars (2001)
(gold) Tomas Thijs: boys' vault (2009)
(silver) Thomas Neuteleers: boys' parallel bars (2009)
(bronze) Maxime Gentges: boys' pommel horse (2011)

== Speed skating (1-1-2) ==
(gold) Stijn Turcksin: boys' short track (1993)
(silver) Steven Adriaensens, Jason Brys, Stijn Turcksin, Jimmy Van Daele & Thomas Van Vossel, boys' short track 3000m relay (1993)
(bronze) Ward Jansens: boys' 1000m short track (1999)
(bronze) Elke Adriaensens, Anthony De Smet, Ward Jansens & Tine Van Landegem: mixed short track 3000m relay (1999)

== Basketball (1-1-1) ==
(bronze) Belgium: girls' (1997)
(silver) Belgium: girls' (2009)
(gold) Belgium: girls' (2011)

== Table tennis (1-1-0) ==
(gold) Lauric Jean & Cédric Nuytinck: boys' doubles (2007)
(silver) Lauric Jean: boys' single (2007)

== Volleyball (1-0-2) ==
(bronze) Belgium: girls' (1991)
(gold) Belgium: girls' (2007)
(bronze) Belgium: girls' (2009)

== Yachting (1-0-0) ==
(gold) Koen De Smedt: boys' Optimist (1997)

== Snowboarding (0-1-0) ==
(silver) Jules De Sloover: boys' slopestyle (2019)

== See also ==
- Belgium at the 2009 Summer EYOF
- Belgium at the Youth Olympics
- Belgium at the Olympics
- Belgium at the Paralympics
- Belgium at the European Games
- Belgium at the Universiade
