= Serbia at the European Youth Olympic Festival =

- IOC code: SRB
- NOC: Olympic Committee of Serbia
- Website: www.oks.org.rs (in Serbian)
- Medals: Gold 14 Silver 28 Bronze 24 Total 66

Serbia participated at the European Youth Olympic Festival since its establishment in 1991.

From 1991−2001 Serbia competed under the name Federal Republic of Yugoslavia. In that period did not compete in only 2 EYOFs, both Summer and Winter in 1993 due to UN sanctions. Between 2003−2005. competed under the name Serbia and Montenegro. From 2007 forward it competes as Serbia.

Serbia hosted the 2007 European Youth Summer Olympic Festival in Belgrade. Big D

== Medal tables ==
=== Medals by Summer Youth Olympic Festival ===
Games	Athletes	Gold	Silver	Bronze	Total	Rank
(Belgium) 1991 Brussels		0	0	1	1	21
(Netherlands) 1993 Valkenswaard	Did not participate					
(United Kingdom) 1995 Bath		0	0	2	2	33
(Portugal) 1997 Lisbon		1	0	1	2	23
(Denmark) 1999 Esbjerg		1	2	0	3	19
(Spain) 2001 Murcia		2	1	2	5	17
(France) 2003 Paris		0	4	0	4	28
(Italy) 2005 Lignano Sabbiadoro	59	1	2	2	5	23
(Serbia) 2007 Belgrade	122	3	3	3	9	13
(Finland) 2009 Tampere	98	2	5	3	10	11
(Turkey) 2011 Trabzon	100	0	3	2	5	28
(Netherlands) 2013 Utrecht	63	1	1	0	2	26
(Georgia (country)) 2015 Tbilisi	62	2	4	3	9	17
(Hungary) 2017 Győr	43	1	2	2	5	24
(Azerbaijan) 2019 Baku		0	1	3	4	32
(Slovakia) 2021 Košice	Future event					
Total		14	28	24	62	

=== Medals by Winter Youth Olympic Festival ===
Games	Athletes	Gold	Silver	Bronze	Total	Rank
(Italy) 1993 Aosta	Did not participate					
1995 Andorra		0	0	0	0	–
(Sweden) 1997 Sundsvall		0	0	0	0	–
(Slovakia) 1999 Poprad-Tatry		0	0	0	0	–
(Finland) 2001 Vuokatti		0	0	0	0	–
(Slovenia) 2003 Bled	14	0	0	0	0	–
(Switzerland) 2005 Monthey	17	0	0	0	0	–
(Spain) 2007 Jaca	18	0	1	0	1	13
(Poland) 2009 Upper Silesia	11	0	0	0	0	–
(Czech Republic) 2011 Liberec	6	0	0	0	0	–
(Romania) 2013 Braşov	5	0	0	0	0	–
(Austria) / 2015 Vorarlberg and Liechtenstein	2	0	0	0	0	–
(Turkey) 2017 Erzurum	3	0	0	0	0	–
(Bosnia and Herzegovina) 2019 Sarajevo & East Sarajevo	3	0	0	0	0	–
(Finland) 2021 Vuokatti	Future events					
(Italy) 2023 Friuli-Venezia Giulia	Future events					
Total		0	1	0	1	

=== Medals by summer sport ===
Sport	Gold	Silver	Bronze	Total
Athletics	9	11	5	25
Judo	2	5	8	15
Basketball	1	2	1	4
Swimming	1	1	1	3
Water polo	1	0	0	1
Volleyball	0	5	0	5
Table tennis	0	2	2	4
Tennis	0	1	2	3
Handball	0	0	2	2
Totals (9 entries)	14	27	21	62

=== Medals by winter sport ===
Sport	Gold	Silver	Bronze	Total
Snowboarding	0	1	0	1
Totals (1 entries)	0	1	0	1

== List of medalists ==
=== Summer Festivals ===
Medal	Name	Games	Sport	Event
Bronze	Silvija Erdelji	(Belgium) 1991 Brussels	Table tennis	Women's Singles
Bronze	Tatjana Trivić	(United Kingdom) 1995 Bath	Judo	36 kg
Bronze	Radmila Kvrgić	(United Kingdom) 1995 Bath	Judo	56 kg
Gold	Sonja Stolić	(Portugal) 1997 Lisbon	Athletics	1500m
Bronze	Siniša Šupić	(Portugal) 1997 Lisbon	Judo	86 kg
Gold	Marina Munćan	(Denmark) 1999 Esbjerg	Athletics	3000m
Silver	Maja Janjić	(Denmark) 1999 Esbjerg	Athletics	Javelin throw
Silver	Basketball team	(Denmark) 1999 Esbjerg	Basketball	Men's tournament
Gold	Miloš Vučković	(Spain) 2001 Murcia	Athletics	2000m steeplechase
Gold	Snežana Kostić	(Spain) 2001 Murcia	Athletics	3000m
Silver	Bojana Žuvić	(Spain) 2001 Murcia	Judo	70 kg
Bronze	Luka Rujević	(Spain) 2001 Murcia	Athletics	Discus throw
Bronze	Handball team	(Spain) 2001 Murcia	Handball	Men's tournament
Silver	Dušan Markešević	(France) 2003 Paris	Athletics	3000m
Silver	Jovana Rogić	(France) 2003 Paris	Judo	52 kg
Silver	Gabriela Feher, Katalin Markuš	(France) 2003 Paris	Table tennis	Women's Doubles
Silver	Zoran Savić, Uroš Gordić	(France) 2003 Paris	Table tennis	Men's Doubles
Gold	Azra Eminović	(Italy) 2005 Lignano Sabbiadoro	Athletics	3000m
Silver	Azra Eminović	(Italy) 2005 Lignano Sabbiadoro	Athletics	1500m
Silver	Nataša Zorić	(Italy) 2005 Lignano Sabbiadoro	Tennis	Women's Singles
Bronze	Arsenije Zlatanović	(Italy) 2005 Lignano Sabbiadoro	Tennis	Men's Singles
Bronze	Arsenije Zlatanović, Nataša Zorić	(Italy) 2005 Lignano Sabbiadoro	Tennis	Mixed Doubles
Gold	Mila Andrić	(Serbia) 2007 Belgrade	Athletics	100m Hurdles
Gold	Tatjana Jelača	(Serbia) 2007 Belgrade	Athletics	Javelin throw
Gold	Water polo team	(Serbia) 2007 Belgrade	Water polo	Men's tournament
Silver	Mila Andrić	(Serbia) 2007 Belgrade	Athletics	400m Hurdles
Silver	Ivana Španović	(Serbia) 2007 Belgrade	Athletics	Long jump
Silver	Volleyball team	(Serbia) 2007 Belgrade	Volleyball	Women's tournament
Bronze	Ivana Španović, Angela Terek, Andrijana Andrić, Mila Andrić	(Serbia) 2007 Belgrade	Athletics	4 × 100 m
Bronze	Basketball team	(Serbia) 2007 Belgrade	Basketball	Men's tournament
Bronze	Andrea Todorović, Eva Tot	(Serbia) 2007 Belgrade	Table tennis	Women's doubles
Gold	Amela Terzić	(Finland) 2009 Tampere	Athletics	3000m
Gold	Velimir Stjepanović	(Finland) 2009 Tampere	Swimming	100m Butterfly
Silver	Teodora Simović	(Finland) 2009 Tampere	Athletics	2000m steeplechase
Silver	Marija Vučenović	(Finland) 2009 Tampere	Athletics	Javelin throw
Silver	Jelena Dukić	(Finland) 2009 Tampere	Judo	57 kg
Silver	Velimir Stjepanović	(Finland) 2009 Tampere	Swimming	100m Freestyle
Silver	Volleyball team	(Finland) 2009 Tampere	Volleyball	Men's tournament
Bronze	Amela Terzić	(Finland) 2009 Tampere	Athletics	1500m
Bronze	Ivana Jandrić	(Finland) 2009 Tampere	Judo	70 kg
Bronze	Ilija Ciganović	(Finland) 2009 Tampere	Judo	66 kg
Silver	Nemanja Kojić	(Turkey) 2011 Trabzon	Athletics	800m
Silver	Basketball team	(Turkey) 2011 Trabzon	Basketball	Men's tournament
Silver	Volleyball team	(Turkey) 2011 Trabzon	Volleyball	Women's tournament
Bronze	Olja Nikolić	(Turkey) 2011 Trabzon	Athletics	2000m steeplechase
Bronze	Handball team	(Turkey) 2011 Trabzon	Handball	Men's tournament
Gold	Basketball team	(Netherlands) 2013 Utrecht	Basketball	Men's tournament
Silver	Volleyball team	(Netherlands) 2013 Utrecht	Volleyball	Women's tournament
Gold	Elzan Bibić	(Georgia (country)) 2015 Tbilisi	Athletics	3000m
Gold	Jovana Obradović	(Georgia (country)) 2015 Tbilisi	Judo	63 kg
Silver	Elzan Bibić	(Georgia (country)) 2015 Tbilisi	Athletics	1500m
Silver	Tamara Mićević	(Georgia (country)) 2015 Tbilisi	Athletics	1500m
Silver	Tamara Mićević	(Georgia (country)) 2015 Tbilisi	Athletics	3000m
Silver	Volleyball team	(Georgia (country)) 2015 Tbilisi	Volleyball	Women's tournament
Bronze	Katarina Sekulić	(Georgia (country)) 2015 Tbilisi	Athletics	400m
Bronze	Nadežda Petrović	(Georgia (country)) 2015 Tbilisi	Judo	48 kg
Bronze	Aleksa Bobar	(Georgia (country)) 2015 Tbilisi	Swimming	100m freestyle
Gold	Andrea Stojadinov	(Hungary) 2017 Győr	Judo	48 kg
Silver	Marica Perišić	(Hungary) 2017 Győr	Judo	57 kg
Silver	Anja Obradović	(Hungary) 2017 Győr	Judo	63 kg
Bronze	Ana Bjelić	(Hungary) 2017 Győr	Judo	40 kg
Bronze	Ana Bjelić, Andrea Stojadinov, Marica Perišić, Anja Obradović	(Hungary) 2017 Győr	Judo	Team event

=== Winter Festivals ===
Medal	Name	Games	Sport	Event
Silver	Nina Micić	(Spain) 2007 Jaca	Snowboarding	Parallel Giant Slalom

== See also ==
- Serbia at the Youth Olympics
- Serbia at the Olympics
- Serbia at the Paralympics
- Serbia at the European Games
- Serbia at the Universiade
