= European Youth Olympic Festival =

International recurring sports competitions

The European Youth Olympic Festival (EYOF) is a biennial multi-sport event for youth (14 to 18 years old) athletes from the 50 member countries of the association of European Olympic Committees. The festival has a summer edition, held for the first time in Brussels in 1991, and a winter edition, which began two years later in Aosta. It was known as the European Youth Olympic Days from 1991 to 1999.

== History ==
The event is run by the European Olympic Committees, under the patronage of the International Olympic Committee, and was the first multi-sport event in the Olympic tradition specifically for European athletes; it predates its senior equivalent, the European Games by some 24 years, and the Youth Olympic Games by 19 years.

The event should not be confused with the various European junior and youth championships in individual sports, such as the European Junior Athletics Championships which are organised by sporting federations.

== Editions ==
=== Summer ===
Host cities of the European Summer Youth Olympic Festival

European Summer Youth Olympic Festival
Year	Edition	Host city	Host nation	Sports	Events	Nations	Start date	End date	Competitors	Top nation
1991	1	Brussels	Belgium	9	70	33	12 July	21 July	2,084	France
1993	2	Valkenswaard	Netherlands	10	86	43	3 July	9 July	1,874	Russia
1995	3	Bath	(United Kingdom) Great Britain	10	86	47	9 July	14 July	1,709	Great Britain
1997	4	Lisbon	Portugal	10	86	47	18 July	24 July	2,500	Russia
1999	5	Esbjerg	Denmark	11	84	48	10 July	16 July	2,324	Russia
2001	6	Murcia	Spain	10	90	48	3 July	9 July	2,500	Russia
2003	7	Paris	France	10	95	48	28 July	2 August	2,500	Russia
2005	8	Lignano Sabbiadoro	Italy	11	109	48	3 July	8 July	3,965	Russia
2007	9	Belgrade	Serbia	11	100	49	22 July	27 July	3,000	Russia
2009	10	Tampere	Finland	9	109	49	19 July	26 July	3,302	Russia
2011	11	Trabzon	Turkey	9	109	49	24 July	29 July	3,138	Russia
2013	12	Utrecht	Netherlands	9	111	49	14 July	19 July	3,143	Russia
2015	13	Tbilisi	(Georgia (country)) Georgia	9	112	50	26 July	1 August	3,304	Russia
2017	14	Győr	Hungary	10	130	50	22 July	30 July	3,675	Russia
2019	15	Baku	Azerbaijan	10	135	48	20 July	28 July	2,700	Russia
2022	16	Banská Bystrica	Slovakia	10	120	48	24 July	30 July	2,252	Italy
2023	17	Maribor	Slovenia	10	122	48	23 July	29 July	2,419	Italy
2025	18	Skopje	North Macedonia	13	151	49	20 July	26 July	4,000	Italy
2027	19	Lignano Sabbiadoro	Italy							
2029	20	Flanders	Belgium							
2031	21	Liepāja	Latvia							

=== Winter ===
Host cities of the European Winter Youth Olympic Festival

European Winter Youth Olympic Festival
Year	Edition	Host city	Host nation	Sports	Events	Nations	Start date	End date	Competitors	Top nation
1993	1	Aosta	Italy	5	17	33	7 February	10 February	708	Russia
1995	2	Andorra la Vella	Andorra	4	17	40	4 February	10 February	740	Italy
1997	3	Sundsvall	Sweden	6	27	41	7 February	13 February	991	Russia
1999	4	Poprad-Tatry	Slovakia	7	27	40	6 March	12 March	819	Russia
2001	5	Vuokatti	Finland	7	28	40	11 March	15 March	1,111	Russia
2003	6	Bled	Slovenia	7	28	41	25 January	31 January	1,242	Russia
2005	7	Monthey	Switzerland	8	35	41	23 January	28 January	1,184	Russia
2007	8	Jaca	Spain	6	20	43	18 February	23 February	1,284	Russia
2009	9	Silesia	Poland	9	31	47	15 February	20 February	1,615	Russia
2011	10	Liberec	Czech Republic	8	28	44	13 February	18 February	1,492	Germany
2013	11	Braşov	Romania	8	36	45	17 February	22 February	1,465	Russia
2015	12	Vorarlberg-Liechtenstein	Austria; Liechtenstein	8	30	45	25 January	30 January	1,509	Russia
2017	13	Erzurum	Turkey	9	38	34	12 February	17 February	1,241	Russia
2019	14	Sarajevo-East Sarajevo	Bosnia and Herzegovina	8	32	46	10 February	15 February	1,537	Norway
2022	15	Vuokatti	Finland	9	39	46	20 March	25 March	932	Finland
2023	16	Friuli-Venezia Giulia	Italy	12	59	47	21 January	28 January	1,252	France
2025	17	Bakuriani	(Georgia (country)) Georgia	8	38	45	9 February	16 February	901	Italy
2027	18	Braşov	Romania							
2029	19	Liberec	Czech Republic							

== Sports ==
=== Summer Games ===
Sport (discipline)		91	93	95	97	99	01	03	05	07	09	11	13	15	17	19	22	23	25
Current summer sports
Athletics	Athletics	•	•	•	•	•	•	•	•	•	•	•	•	•	•	•	•	•	•
Badminton	Badminton						•										•		•
Basketball	Basketball	•	•	•	•	•	•	•	•	•	•	•	•	•	•	•	•	•	•
Canoeing	Canoeing								•						•				•
Cycling	Cycling		•	•	•	•	•		•	•	•	•	•	•	•	•	•	•	•
Gymnastics	Gymnastics		•	•	•	•	•	•	•	•	•	•	•	•	•	•	•	•	•
Handball	Handball			•	•	•	•	•	•	•	•	•	•	•	•	•	•	•	•
Judo	Judo	•	•	•	•	•	•	•	•	•	•	•	•	•	•	•	•	•	•
Shooting	Shooting																		•
Swimming	Swimming	•	•	•	•	•	•	•	•	•	•	•	•	•	•	•	•	•	•
Table tennis	Table tennis	•						•		•									•
Taekwondo	Taekwondo																		•
Volleyball	Volleyball	•	•	•	•	•	•	•	•	•	•	•	•	•	•	•	•	•	•
Discontinued summer sports
Field hockey	Field hockey	•	•	•															
Football	Football	•	•	•	•	•	•	•	•										
Sailing	Sailing				•		•												
Skateboarding	Skateboarding																	•	
Tennis	Tennis	•	•				•		•	•	•	•	•	•	•	•	•	•	
Water polo	Water polo									•									
Wrestling	Wrestling															•			

=== Winter Games ===
Sport (discipline)		93	95	97	99	01	03	05	07	09	11	13	15	17	19	22	23	25
Current winter sports
Alpine skiing	Alpine skiing	•	•	•	•	•	•	•	•	•	•	•	•	•	•	•	•	•
Biathlon	Biathlon	•		•	•	•	•	•	•	•	•	•	•	•	•	•	•	•
Cross-country skiing	Cross-country skiing	•	•	•	•	•	•	•	•	•	•	•	•	•	•	•	•	•
Figure skating	Figure skating	•	•	•	•		•	•	•	•	•	•	•	•	•	•	•	•
Freestyle skiing	Freestyle skiing																•	•
Ice hockey	Ice hockey			•	•	•	•	•	•	•	•	•	•	•	•	•	•	•
Short-track speed skating	Short-track speed skating	•	•	•	•			•				•		•	•	•	•	•
Snowboarding	Snowboarding					•		•	•	•	•	•	•	•	•	•	•	•
Discontinued winter sports
Curling	Curling							•		•				•	•		•	
Ski jumping	Ski jumping				•	•	•			•	•	•	•	•		•	•	
Nordic combined	Nordic combined						•			•	•		•			•	•	
Ski mountaineering	Ski mountaineering																•	
Speed skating	Speed skating			•		•												

== All-time medal table ==
=== Summer Games ===
Summer editions, from 1991 to 2025 European Youth Summer Olympic Festival.

European Youth Olympic Festival medal table
Rank	NOC	Gold	Silver	Bronze	Total
1	Russia (RUS)	272	175	149	596
2	Great Britain (GBR)	171	138	133	442
3	Italy (ITA)	168	146	165	479
4	France (FRA)	117	120	126	363
5	Hungary (HUN)	99	89	125	313
6	Germany (GER)	97	123	138	358
7	Spain (ESP)	85	88	98	271
8	Ukraine (UKR)	79	89	94	262
9	Romania (ROU)	69	95	83	247
10	Poland (POL)	60	62	92	214
11	Netherlands (NED)	56	57	86	199
12	Turkey (TUR)	54	46	61	161
13	Belgium (BEL)	48	51	67	166
14	Azerbaijan (AZE)	35	29	59	123
15	Sweden (SWE)	34	41	39	114
16	Czech Republic (CZE)	30	38	58	126
17	Georgia (GEO)	30	28	53	111
18	Croatia (CRO)	29	31	32	92
19	Belarus (BLR)	29	27	50	106
20	Slovenia (SLO)	26	38	48	112
21	Switzerland (SUI)	25	40	38	103
22	Denmark (DEN)	23	19	35	77
23	Finland (FIN)	22	31	30	83
24	Israel (ISR)	21	21	23	65
25	Lithuania (LTU)	20	18	26	64
26	Serbia (SRB)	19	25	25	69
27	Slovakia (SVK)	18	20	34	72
28	Austria (AUT)	16	23	39	78
29	Ireland (IRL)	15	29	34	78
30	Portugal (POR)	15	15	26	56
31	Estonia (EST)	15	15	13	43
32	Greece (GRE)	13	26	36	75
33	Norway (NOR)	13	22	19	54
34	Soviet Union (URS)	12	5	7	24
35	Latvia (LAT)	11	20	17	48
36	Moldova (MDA)	11	8	18	37
37	Bulgaria (BUL)	10	19	19	48
38	Cyprus (CYP)	6	6	8	20
39	NOC Belarus	5	4	4	13
40	Yugoslavia (YUG)	4	3	6	13
41	Armenia (ARM)	3	2	11	16
42	Iceland (ISL)	3	1	3	7
43	Luxembourg (LUX)	3	1	1	5
44	Bosnia and Herzegovina (BIH)	2	4	5	11
45	Czechoslovakia (TCH)	2	2	0	4
46	Serbia and Montenegro (SCG)	1	6	2	9
47	Montenegro (MNE)	1	2	2	5
48	Kosovo (KOS)	1	0	1	2
49	Albania (ALB)	0	0	1	1
49	Andorra (AND)	0	0	1	1
49	Malta (MLT)	0	0	1	1
Totals (51 entries)		1,898	1,898	2,241	6,037

=== Winter Games ===
Winter editions, from 1993 to 2025 European Youth Olympic Winter Festival.

European Youth Olympic Festival medal table
Rank	NOC	Gold	Silver	Bronze	Total
1	Russia (RUS)	97	66	50	213
2	France (FRA)	49	51	54	154
3	Italy (ITA)	48	57	41	146
4	Germany (GER)	41	44	52	137
5	Norway (NOR)	39	40	41	120
6	Austria (AUT)	38	39	40	117
7	Finland (FIN)	30	31	35	96
8	Slovenia (SLO)	28	17	20	65
9	Sweden (SWE)	27	29	21	77
10	Switzerland (SUI)	25	30	41	96
11	Hungary (HUN)	18	10	10	38
12	Czech Republic (CZE)	17	20	22	59
13	Poland (POL)	12	20	21	53
14	Netherlands (NED)	11	9	12	32
15	Great Britain (GBR)	8	3	11	22
16	Spain (ESP)	7	1	1	9
17	Ukraine (UKR)	6	10	10	26
18	Slovakia (SVK)	5	5	8	18
19	Estonia (EST)	3	9	4	16
20	Croatia (CRO)	3	1	2	6
21	Belarus (BLR)	2	4	6	12
22	Latvia (LAT)	2	3	2	7
23	Bulgaria (BUL)	1	6	2	9
24	Belgium (BEL)	1	3	3	7
25	Lithuania (LTU)	1	3	0	4
26	Romania (ROU)	1	2	4	7
27	Georgia (GEO)	1	2	1	4
28	Luxembourg (LUX)	1	1	0	2
29	Israel (ISR)	1	0	2	3
30	Turkey (TUR)	0	3	5	8
31	Denmark (DEN)	0	2	1	3
32	Serbia (SRB)	0	2	0	2
Totals (32 entries)		523	523	522	1,568

=== Combined medal table ===
From 1991 to 2025 European Youth Summer Olympic Festival.

European Youth Olympic Festival medal table
Rank	NOC	Gold	Silver	Bronze	Total
1	Russia (RUS)	369	241	199	809
2	Italy (ITA)	216	203	206	625
3	Great Britain (GBR)	175	139	135	449
4	France (FRA)	166	172	181	519
5	Germany (GER)	138	167	179	484
6	Hungary (HUN)	117	99	135	351
7	Spain (ESP)	92	89	100	281
8	Ukraine (UKR)	89	101	113	303
9	Poland (POL)	72	82	113	267
10	Romania (ROU)	70	97	87	254
11	Netherlands (NED)	67	66	98	231
12	Sweden (SWE)	61	70	60	191
13	Austria (AUT)	54	62	79	195
14	Slovenia (SLO)	54	59	69	182
15	Turkey (TUR)	54	49	65	168
16	Finland (FIN)	52	62	64	178
17	Norway (NOR)	52	62	60	174
18	Switzerland (SUI)	50	70	79	199
19	Belgium (BEL)	49	54	70	173
20	Czech Republic (CZE)	47	57	80	184
21	Azerbaijan (AZE)	35	29	59	123
22	Croatia (CRO)	32	32	34	98
23	Belarus (BLR)	31	31	56	118
24	Georgia (GEO)	31	30	54	115
25	Slovakia (SVK)	23	25	42	90
26	Denmark (DEN)	23	21	36	80
27	Israel (ISR)	22	21	25	68
28	Lithuania (LTU)	21	21	26	68
29	Serbia (SRB)	19	27	25	71
30	Estonia (EST)	18	24	17	59
31	Ireland (IRL)	15	29	34	78
32	Portugal (POR)	15	15	26	56
33	Greece (GRE)	13	26	36	75
34	Latvia (LAT)	13	23	19	55
35	Soviet Union (URS)	12	5	7	24
36	Bulgaria (BUL)	11	25	21	57
37	Moldova (MDA)	11	8	18	37
38	Cyprus (CYP)	6	6	8	20
39	NOC Belarus	5	4	4	13
40	Yugoslavia (YUG)	4	3	6	13
41	Luxembourg (LUX)	4	2	1	7
42	Armenia (ARM)	3	2	11	16
43	Iceland (ISL)	3	1	3	7
44	Bosnia and Herzegovina (BIH)	2	4	5	11
45	Czechoslovakia (TCH)	2	2	0	4
46	Serbia and Montenegro (SCG)	1	6	2	9
47	Montenegro (MNE)	1	2	2	5
48	Kosovo (KOS)	1	0	1	2
49	Albania (ALB)	0	0	1	1
49	Andorra (AND)	0	0	1	1
49	Malta (MLT)	0	0	1	1
Totals (51 entries)		2,421	2,425	2,753	7,599

== See also ==
- European Para Youth Games (EPYG)
- European Games
- Youth Olympic Games
- African Youth Games
- Australian Youth Olympic Festival (AYOF)
- Asian Youth Games (AYG)
- South American Youth Games
- Junior Pan American Games
