= Speed skating at the European Youth Olympic Winter Festival =

European Youth Olympic Festival (also European Youth Olympic Days) is a multi-sport event held in both summer and winter disciplines every second year. Speed skating is one of the sports in its winter edition. The competition is held in junior category.

== Medalists ==
=== Junior ladies ===
500 metres
Year	Location	Gold	Silver	Bronze	Details
competition not held in 1993, 1995
1997	(Sweden) Sundsvall	(Netherlands) Wieteke Cramer	(Netherlands) Helen van Goozen	(Italy) Daniela Niederstätter	
competition not held in 1999
2001	(Finland) Vuokatti	(Russia) Yulia Bushueva	(Czech Republic) Marcela Krámarová	(Norway) Maren Haugli	
competition not held since 2001

1 000 metres
Year	Location	Gold	Silver	Bronze	Details
competition not held in 1993, 1995
1997	(Sweden) Sundsvall	(Netherlands) Helen van Goozen	(Netherlands) Wieteke Cramer	(Romania) Andrea Jakab	
competition not held in 1999
2001	(Finland) Vuokatti	(Russia) Yulia Bushueva	(Norway) Mari Hemmer	(Netherlands) Mariska Huisman	
competition not held since 2001

=== Junior men ===
500 metres
Year	Location	Gold	Silver	Bronze	Details
competition not held in 1993, 1995
1997	(Sweden) Sundsvall	(Sweden) Eric Zachrisson	(Russia) Sergey Batyatin	(Poland) Marcin Gralla	
competition not held in 1999
2001	(Finland) Vuokatti	(Italy) Alessandro Magnabosco	(Netherlands) Remco olde Heuvel	(Poland) Konrad Niedźwiedzki	
competition not held since 2001

1 500 metres
Year	Location	Gold	Silver	Bronze	Details
competition not held in 1993, 1995
1997	(Sweden) Sundsvall	(Sweden) Eric Zachrisson	(Poland) Marcin Gralla	(Netherlands) Auke Kranenborg	
competition not held in 1999
2001	(Finland) Vuokatti	(Netherlands) Remco olde Heuvel	(Poland) Konrad Niedźwiedzki	(Belarus) Ihor Makavetski	
competition not held since 2001

== Cumulative medal count ==
Rank	Nation	Gold	Silver	Bronze	Total
1	Netherlands (NED)	3	3	2	8
2	Russia (RUS)	2	1	0	3
3	Sweden (SWE)	2	0	0	2
4	Italy (ITA)	1	0	1	2
5	Poland (POL)	0	2	2	4
6	Norway (NOR)	0	1	1	2
7	Czech Republic (CZE)	0	1	0	1
8	Belarus (BLR)	0	0	1	1
8	Romania (ROM)	0	0	1	1
Totals (9 entries)		8	8	8	24
