= 2003 European Youth Olympic Festival =

2003 European Youth Olympic Festival may refer to:

- 2003 European Youth Summer Olympic Festival
- 2003 European Youth Olympic Winter Festival
