= Basketball at the 1993 European Youth Summer Olympic Days =

Basketball at the 1993 European Youth Olympic Days
- Host city: Valkenswaard, Netherlands
- Date(s): 1993
- Nations participating: 50
- Events: 26

The basketball competition at the 1993 European Youth Summer Olympic Days was held from 18 to 20 July. The events took place in Valkenswaard, Netherlands. Boys born 1978 or 1979 or later participated in the event. No girls event was held.

In terms of medals, the result was an exact repeat of the 1991 competition, with Spain taking gold ahead of Italy, and Greece.

== Medal summary ==
=== Men ===
| Event | Gold | Silver | Bronze |
|---|---|---|---|
| Basketball | Spain | Italy | Greece |
