= 2007 European Youth Olympic Festival =

2007 European Youth Olympic Festival may refer to:

- 2007 European Youth Summer Olympic Festival
- 2007 European Youth Olympic Winter Festival
