= Cycling at the 1993 European Youth Summer Olympic Days =

The cycling competition at the 1993 European Youth Summer Olympic Days was held from 18 to 20 July. The events took place in Valkenswaard, Netherlands. Boys born 1978 or 1979 or later participated in the event.

== Medal summary ==
Event	Gold		Silver		Bronze	
Men's criterium	Steven Malderghem; Belgium	1:30:060	Andrey Koroliov; Ukraine	s.t.	Tamme Tim Hiemstra; Netherlands	s.t.
