= 2001 European Youth Olympic Festival =

2001 European Youth Olympic Festival may refer to:

- 2001 European Youth Summer Olympic Festival
- 2001 European Youth Olympic Winter Festival
