= 2005 European Youth Olympic Festival =

2005 European Youth Olympic Festival may refer to:

- 2005 European Youth Summer Olympic Festival
- 2005 European Youth Olympic Winter Festival
