= Tennis at the 2017 European Youth Summer Olympic Festival =

- Venue: Olympic Sports Park - Tennis Center
- Dates: 24–29 July

Tennis at the 2017 European Youth Summer Olympic Festival was held at Olympic Sports Park, Győr, Hungary from 24 to 29 July 2017.

Tennis had doubles and singles events for men and women competition.

== Medalists ==
Event	Gold	Silver	Bronze
Boys singles	Lorenzo Rottoli; Italy	David Ionel; Romania	Dawid Taczala; Poland
Boys doubles	Italy; Flavio Cobolli; Lorenzo Rottoli	Russia; Egor Agafonov; Alibek Kachmazov	Poland; Mikołaj Lorens; Dawid Taczala
Girls singles	Clara Tauson; Denmark	Avelina Sayfetdinova; Russia	Sinja Kraus; Austria
Girls doubles	Russia; Elina Avanesyan; Avelina Sayfetdinova	Slovenia; Živa Falkner; Pia Lovrič	Estonia; Carol Plakk; Katriin Saar

== Medal table ==
Rank	Nation	Gold	Silver	Bronze	Total
1	Italy (ITA)	2	0	0	2
2	Russia (RUS)	1	2	0	3
3	Denmark (DEN)	1	0	0	1
4	Romania (ROU)	0	1	0	1
4	Slovenia (SLO)	0	1	0	1
6	Poland (POL)	0	0	2	2
7	Austria (AUT)	0	0	1	1
7	Estonia (EST)	0	0	1	1
Totals (8 entries)		4	4	4	12
