= Belgium at the 2009 Summer EYOF =

Belgium competed in the 2009 European Youth Summer Olympic Festival in Tampere, Finland.

== Athletics ==
=== Men ===
Athlete	Events	Heats		Semifinal		Final	
Athlete	Events	Result	Rank	Result	Rank	Result	Rank
Julien Watrin	100m	10"86	1st Q	10"96	2nd Q	10"82	Silver medal
Julien Watrin	200m	22"11	5th Q	21"65	3rd Q	21"06	Gold medal
Quentin Kebron	800m	1'56"31	6th Q	1'54"59	10th	did not advance	
Tarik Moukrime	1,500m					Did not finish	
Pieter-Jan Hannes	3,000m					8'34"28	4th
Rodric Seutin	110m hurdles	14"11	7th Q			13"84	4th
Stef Vanhaeren	400m hurdles	52"25	1st Q			51"09	Gold medal
Sander Maes	High Jump	1m99	2nd Q			2m04	7th
Mathias Sanctorum	Long Jump	6m73	17th			did not advance	
Leopold Kapata	Triple Jump					14m39	9th
Arne Broeders	Javelin						
Arnaud Art	Pole Vault						
Frederik Claes; Rodric Seutin; Stef Vanhaeren; Julien Watrin	4x100m	41"73	3rd Q				

=== Women ===
Athlete	Events	Heat		Semifinal		Final	
Athlete	Events	Result	Rank	Result	Rank	Result	Rank
Imke Vervaet	200m	24"71	3rd Q				
Zenobie Vangansbeke	1,500m					4'28"19	7th
Dorien Van Diest	100m hurdles	14"12	11th Q	14"01	12th	did not advance	
Katrijn Boone	400m hurdles	1'02"74	7th Q			1'01"35	5th
Sofie Gallein	2,000m Steeple					6'42"71	Gold medal
Jolien Dirckx	High Jump	1m74	10th Q			1m75	8th
Stefie Mievis	Long Jump	5m20	25th			did not advance	
Aurélie De Ryck	Pole Vault					3m80	Bronze medal
Katrijn Boone; Ella De Maitre; Camille Laus; Imke Vervaet	4x100m	46"93	6th Q				

== Basketball ==
=== Women ===
Squad list	Group stage		Semifinal	Final	
Squad list	Opposition Score	Rank	Opposition Score	Opposition Score	Rank
Heleen Adams; Antonia Delaere; Lien Delmulle; Lynn Delvaux; Sien Devliegher; Celine Hardy; Alisson Mai; Katrien Matthyssen; Emma Meeseman; Cloée Ory; Ann Schyvens; Julie Vanloo	Poland; W 81 - 44	1st Q	Sweden; W 75 - 58	France	
Heleen Adams; Antonia Delaere; Lien Delmulle; Lynn Delvaux; Sien Devliegher; Celine Hardy; Alisson Mai; Katrien Matthyssen; Emma Meeseman; Cloée Ory; Ann Schyvens; Julie Vanloo	Turkey; L 61 - 70	1st Q	Sweden; W 75 - 58	France	
Heleen Adams; Antonia Delaere; Lien Delmulle; Lynn Delvaux; Sien Devliegher; Celine Hardy; Alisson Mai; Katrien Matthyssen; Emma Meeseman; Cloée Ory; Ann Schyvens; Julie Vanloo	Spain; W 64 - 39	1st Q	Sweden; W 75 - 58	France	

== Cycling ==
=== Men ===
Athlete	Event	Time	Rank
Martijn Degreve	Criterium	Did not finish	
Martijn Degreve	Road Race	lapped	67th
Martijn Degreve	Time Trial	10'23"98 (+30"72)	29th
Rob Leemans	Criterium	47'34"	23rd
Rob Leemans	Road Race	1h42'58" (+1'12")	28th
Rob Leemans	Time Trial	10'24"39 (+31"13)	30th
Boris Vallee	Criterium	Did not finish	
Boris Vallee	Road Race	1h42'58" (+1'12")	12th
Boris Vallee	Time Trial	10'09"39 (+16"13)	14th

== Gymnastics ==
=== Men ===
Athlete	Event	Apparatus						Qualification	
Athlete	Event	Floor	Pommel Horse	Rings	Vault	Parallel Bars	Horizontal Bar	Total	Rank
Thomas Neuteleers	All-Around	12.350	10.950	12.500	14.400	13.800	13.050	77.050	14th Q
Tomas Thys	All-Around	13.450	10.650	10.950	14.700	12.650	11.900	74.300	27th Q
Jimmy Verbaeys	All-Around	12.950	12.450	11.900	0.000	12.900	12.150	62.350	68th
Thomas Neuteleers; Tomas Thys; Jimmy Verbaeys	Team	26.400	23.400	24.400	29.100	26.700	25.200	155.200	7th

Individual Finals

Athlete	Event	Final							
Athlete	Event	Floor	Pommel Horse	Rings	Vault	Parallel Bars	Horizontal Bar	Total	Rank
Thomas Neuteleers	Parallel Bars								
Thomas Neuteleers	Horizontal Bar								
Thomas Neuteleers	Individual All-Around	13.450	10.050	12.850	12.900	13.600	12.900	75.750	14th
Tomas Thys	Floor								
Tomas Thys	Individual All-Around	13.100	9.850	12.450	15.200	12.650	10.650	73.900	20th

=== Women ===
Athlete	Event	Apparatus				Qualification	
Athlete	Event	Vault	Uneven Bars	Balance Beam	Floor	Total	Rank
Julie Croket	All-Around	14.150	12.050	13.700	13.650	53.550	9th Q
Eline Vandersteen	All-Around	13.100	12.500	12.000	12.700	50.300	34th
Antje Van De Velde	All-Around	13.150	12.750	11.700	12.300	49.900	36th
Julie Croket; Eline Vandersteen; Antje Van De Velde	Team	27.300	25.250	25.700	26.350	104.600	10th

Individual Finals

Athlete	Event	Final					
Athlete	Event	Vault	Uneven Bars	Balance Beam	Floor	Total	Rank
Julie Croket	Vault						
Julie Croket	Balance Beam						
Julie Croket	Floor						
Julie Croket	Individual All-Around	14.100	12.750	13.250	13.500	53.600	9th

== Judo ==
=== Men ===
Athlete	Event	Round of 32	Round of 16	Quarterfinal	Repechage 1st Round	Repechage Quarterfinals	Repechage Semifinals	Bronze medal match	Rank
Athlete	Event	Opposition Result	Opposition Result	Opposition Result	Opposition Result	Opposition Result	Opposition Result	Opposition Result	Rank
Geoffrey Maes	−50 kg	Bye	L G Harutyunyan (ARM)		W V Staruhs (LAT)	L E Magdich (RUS)	did not advance		9th
Jérémie Bottieau	−66 kg	w J Biekman (NED)	W A Hryhortsov (UKR)	L R Moustopoulos (GRE)		W P Marincic (SLO)	L I Ciganovic (SRB)	did not advance	7th
Toma Nikiforov	−90 kg	Bye	D Häfner (GER)						

=== Women ===
Athlete	Event	Round of 32	Round of 16	Quarterfinal	Semifinal	Repechage Quarterfinals	Repechage Semifinals	Medal match	Rank
Athlete	Event	Opposition Result	Opposition Result	Opposition Result	Opposition Result	Opposition Result	Opposition Result	Opposition Result	Rank
Evelien Cappaert	−44 kg	Bye	L V Nizamova (RUS)			L B Batizi (HUN)	did not advance		9th
Lien Moors	−48 kg	Bye	W A Chernetska (UKR)	W AM Ghindariu (ROU)	L D Methetskaya (RUS)			L M Rasinska (POL)	5th
Lola Tielemans	−57 kg	W R Huseynova (AZE)	W E Abdelmoumni (FRA)	L A Szymczak (LAT)		W V Darozhkina (BLR)	L A Zlochenko (ISR)	did not advance	7th
Lise Luyckfasseel	−63 kg	Bye	W B Turrado (ESP)	W T Bozovic (MNE)	L S Diedrich (GER)			W K Huseynova (AZE)	Bronze medal
Lola Mansour	−70 kg	Bye	W I Jandric (SRB)	W L Schneider (GER)	W H Topcagic (BIH)			W V Ferrari (ITA)	Gold medal
Sabra Sassi	+70 kg	Bye	A Sapsai (UKR)						

== Swimming ==
=== Men ===
Athlete	Events	Heat		A- or B-Final	
Athlete	Events	Time	Rank	Time	Rank
Iarre Lafort	50m freestyle	24"72	23rd	did not advance	
Louis Croenen	100m freestyle	52"79	11th QB	did not start	
Louis Croenen	100m butterfly	56"56	9th QB	56"88	11th
Louis Croenen	200m butterfly	2'05"89	8th QA	2'06"08	8th
Louis Croenen	400m medley				
Ward Bauwens	200m freestyle				
Ward Bauwens	400m freestyle	4'01"37	7th QA	4'04"72	8th
Ward Bauwens	1,500m freestyle	16'03"99	8th QA	did not start	
Raf Vandevelde	100m breaststroke	1'06"65	12th QB	1'06"89	12th
Raf Vandevelde	200m breaststroke	2'26"11	15th QB	2'23"80	11th
Charles Navarre	100m backstroke				
Charles Navarre	200m backstroke	2'08"98	11th QB	2'09"06	11th
Nathan Bonnel; Louis Croenen; Iarre Lafort; Olivier Van der Sande	4x100m freestyle relay	3'30"76	3rd Q	3'30"86	6th
Louis Croenen; Charles Navarre; Olivier Van der Sande; Raf Vandevelde	4x100m medley relay				

=== Women ===
Athlete	Events	Heat		Final	
Athlete	Events	Time	Rank	Time	Rank
Morganne Lambrechts	100m freestyle	59"74	13th QB	1'00"57	16th
Yasmine Bonne	200m freestyle	2'11"41	17th QB	2'09"61	13th
Natacha Delvoie	400m freestyle	4'31"23	12th QB	4'34"02	14th
Natacha Delvoie	800m freestyle				
Joan Grandjean	100m butterfly	1'06"41	16th QB	1'06"86	15th
Joan Grandjean	200m butterfly				
Julie De Coster	100m breaststroke				
Julie De Coster	200m breaststroke	2'41"21	14th QB	2'43"04	15th
Chloe Matroule	100m backstroke	1'07"90	17th	did not advance	
Chloe Matroule	200m backstroke	2'25"80	16th QB	2'22"96	12th
Yne Dom	200m medley	2'26"11	11th QB	2'24"69	11th
Yne Dom	400m medley	5'13"41	16th QB	5'06"97	12th
Yasmine Bonne; Yne Dom; Morganne Lambrechts; Chloe Matroule	4x100m freestyle relay	4'01"72	11th	did not advance	
Julie De Coster; Yne Dom; Mirthe Goris; Chloe Matroule	4x100m medley relay				

=== Mixed ===
Athlete	Events	Heat		Final	
Athlete	Events	Time	Rank	Time	Rank
Ward Bauwens; Yasmine Bonne; Louis Croenen; Yne Dom	4x200m freestyle relay	disqualified		did not advance	

== Tennis ==
=== Men ===
Athlete	Event	Round of 64		Round of 32		Round of 16		Quarterfinals		Semifinals		Final	
Athlete	Event	Opposition	Score	Opposition	Score	Opposition	Score	Opposition	Score	Opposition	Score	Opposition	Score
Julien Cagnina	Singles	A Bohan (EST)	6-1; 6-1	D Rocha (POR) (10)	6-1; 6-1	M Palma (ITA) (7)	6-2; 6-1	D Perez Sanz (ESP)	6-3; 6-1	M Jaloviec (CZE)	6-0; 6-0	A Pavlásek (CZE)	2-6; 6-3; 3-6
Joseph Van Dooren	Singles	A Radziukynas (LTU)	6-7(3); 6-2; 6-2	M Hamou (FRA)	6-2; 6-1	J Ward-Hibbert (GBR) (3)	6-2; 3-6; 4-6	did not advance					
Julien Cagnina; Joseph Van Dooren	Doubles			Bye		B Bizjac - R Rozac (SLO) (5)	6-1; 7-5	HL Stentoft - M Torpegaard (DEN)	4-6; 6-7(3)	did not advance			

=== Women ===
Athlete	Event	Round of 64		Round of 32		Round of 16		Quarterfinals		Semifinals		Final	
Athlete	Event	Opposition	Score	Opposition	Score	Opposition	Score	Opposition	Score	Opposition	Score	Opposition	Score
Elke Lemmens	Singles	K von Deichmann (LIE)	4–6; 4–6	did not advance									
An-Sophie Mestach	Singles	AK Schmiedlová (SVK)	6–2; 7–5	N Kostić (SRB)	6–3; 6–2	B Eristavi (GEO) (6)	6–1; 6–1	S Albano (ITA)	6–2; 6–1	I Kremen (BLR)	4–6; 6–1; 6–1	M Ulvefeldt (SWE) (2)	
Elke Lemmens; An-Sophie Mestach	Doubles			Bye		J Heino – E Leivo (FIN) (2)	6–2; 6–2	S Araujo – M Palhoto (POR)	6–2; 6–0	M Bianco – G Rey (SUI)	6–3; 6–2	D Chernetsova – I Kremen (BLR)	

== Volleyball ==
=== Men ===
Squad list	Group stage		Ranking match 5-8	Ranking match 5-6	
Squad list	Opposition Score	Rank	Opposition Score	Opposition Score	Rank
Sam Deroo; Stijn D'hulst; Pierre Henri; Dries Heyrman; Dries Ilsbroux; Tim Lemmens; Jens Martinus; Jelle Perremans; Ben Ponnet; Jelle Ribbens; Kris Van Walle; Anshel Vereecke	Serbia; L 0 - 3	4th	France; W 3 - 1	Russia	
Sam Deroo; Stijn D'hulst; Pierre Henri; Dries Heyrman; Dries Ilsbroux; Tim Lemmens; Jens Martinus; Jelle Perremans; Ben Ponnet; Jelle Ribbens; Kris Van Walle; Anshel Vereecke	Finland; W 3 - 2	4th	France; W 3 - 1	Russia	
Sam Deroo; Stijn D'hulst; Pierre Henri; Dries Heyrman; Dries Ilsbroux; Tim Lemmens; Jens Martinus; Jelle Perremans; Ben Ponnet; Jelle Ribbens; Kris Van Walle; Anshel Vereecke	(Russia) Rusland; L 0 - 3	4th	France; W 3 - 1	Russia	

=== Women ===
Squad list	Group stage		Semifinal	Bronze medal match	
Squad list	Opposition Score	Rank	Opposition Score	Opposition Score	Rank
Delfien Brugman; Sarah Dovogja; Laura Heyrman; Laurine Klinkenberg; Tara Lauwers; Astrid Moortgat; Elien Ruysschaert; Juliette Thevenin; Lore Van den Vonder; Ilka Van de Vyver; Sophie Van Nimmen; Karolien Vleugels	Netherlands; W 3 - 0	2nd Q	Russia; L 2 - 3	Germany	
Delfien Brugman; Sarah Dovogja; Laura Heyrman; Laurine Klinkenberg; Tara Lauwers; Astrid Moortgat; Elien Ruysschaert; Juliette Thevenin; Lore Van den Vonder; Ilka Van de Vyver; Sophie Van Nimmen; Karolien Vleugels	Germany; L 1 - 3	2nd Q	Russia; L 2 - 3	Germany	
Delfien Brugman; Sarah Dovogja; Laura Heyrman; Laurine Klinkenberg; Tara Lauwers; Astrid Moortgat; Elien Ruysschaert; Juliette Thevenin; Lore Van den Vonder; Ilka Van de Vyver; Sophie Van Nimmen; Karolien Vleugels	Italy; W walk-over	2nd Q	Russia; L 2 - 3	Germany	
