= Panticosa-Los Lagos =

Ski resort in Tena Valley, Pyrenees, Spain

Coordinates: 42°42′11″N 0°16′29″W

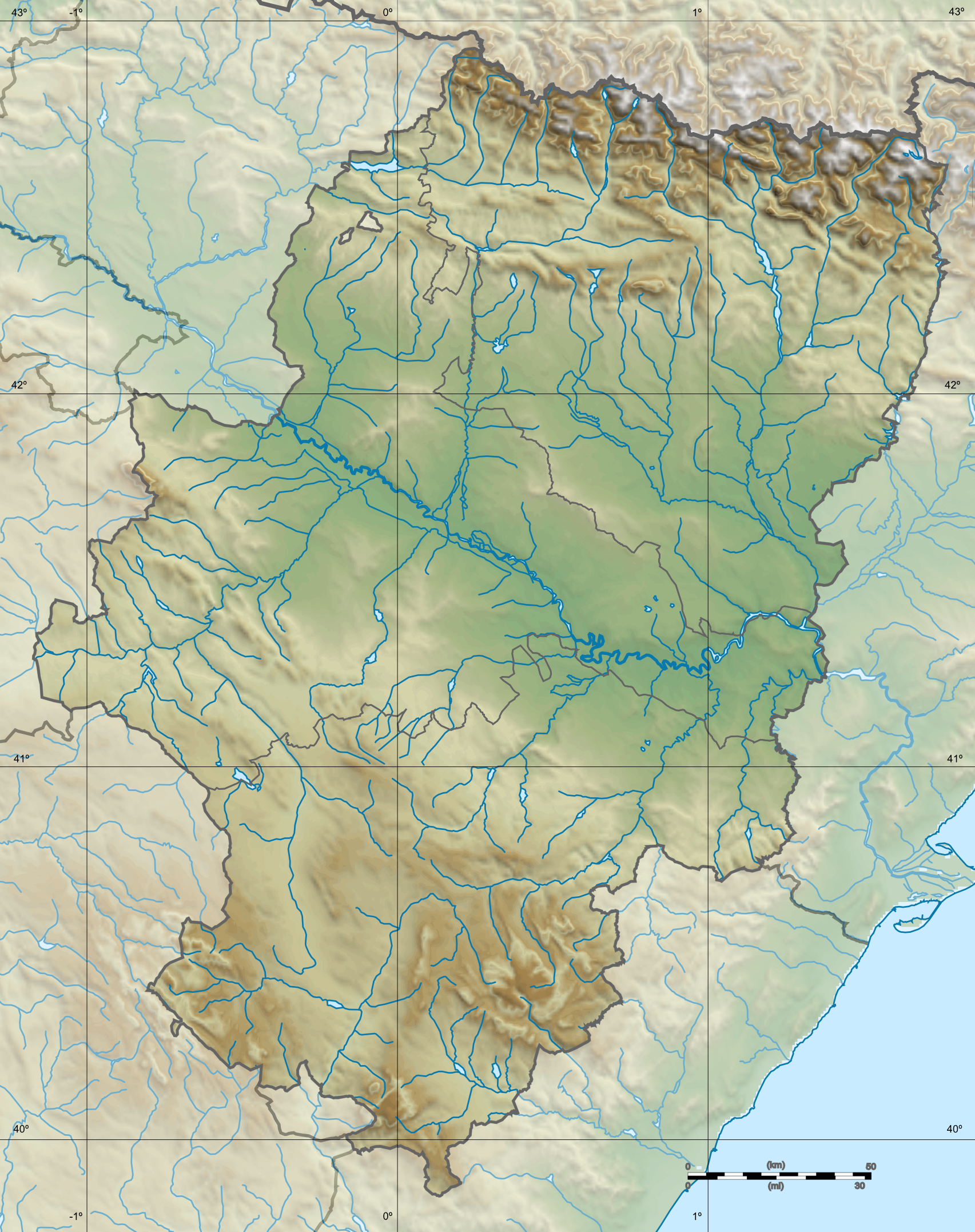
- Location within Spain Location within Aragon Location within Pyrenees
- Location: Tena Valley, Pyrenees, Spain
- Nearest city: Jaca
- Top elevation: 2,200 m (7,200 ft)
- Base elevation: 1,350 m (4,430 ft)
- Skiable area: 34 km (21 mi)
- Trails: 38
- Lift system: 1 gondola lift. 6 chair lifts. 5 ski tows. 3 magic carpet lifts.
- Website: http://www.panticosa-loslagos.com

Former Panticosa-Los Lagos logo

Panticosa-Los Lagos, officially called Aramón Panticosa, is a ski resort situated near the town of Panticosa in the upper Tena Valley of the western Pyrenees (province of Huesca, Spain).

== The resort ==
It has 34 km of marked pistes, being one of the most familiar resorts of the Pyrenees. The highest point is Sabocos peak, 2200 m AMSL, with a vertical drop of 850 m.
The base of the resort is the town of Panticosa, which includes several hotels and apartments and is situated at 1350 m AMSL. From there a gondola lift provides the main access for the resort. The resort itself occupies two different high mountain valleys, defining two sectors: Petrosos and Sabocos. The upper Sabocos valley is accessed by a fast 4 seat chair lift.

=== Lifts ===
Many of the resort's lifts are modern and of high capacity but some are obsolete though the resort is continuously improving them, the resort has:

- 1 gondola lift.
- 6 chair lifts.
- 5 ski tows.
- 3 magic carpet lifts.

=== Pistes ===
The resort offers 38 pistes of different difficulties:

- 4 beginners.
- 14 easy.
- 16 intermediate.
- 4 expert.

=== Services ===
- 1 restaurant.
- 1 skiing school.
- 1 snow gardens for children.
- 1 kindergarten
- 1 ski hiring stores.
