= Camilla Borsotti =

Italian alpine skier (born 1988)

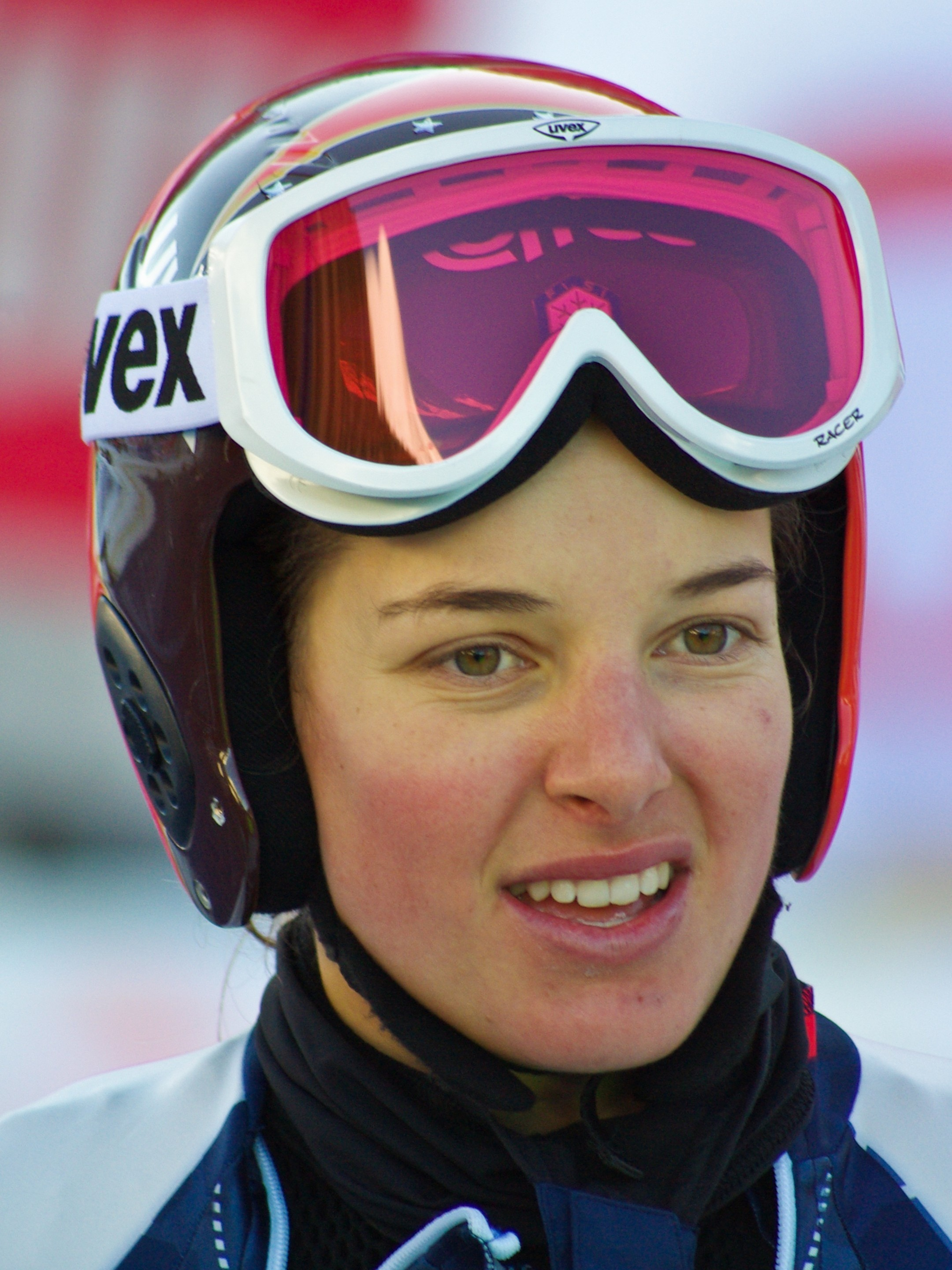

Camilla Borsotti (born 1988) is an Italian alpine skier.

== Biography ==
She won the silver medal in the super-G at the 2006 World Junior Championships, and also competed at the 2005 and 2007 World Junior Championships

She made her World Cup debut in December 2005 in Lienz, not managing to finish the race. She collected her first World Cup points with a 27th place in the December 2006 super combined at Reiteralm, and in the same discipline she broke the top-10 barrier when finishing 7th in December 2007 in St. Anton. Equalling this placement in March 2011 in Tarvisio, it remained her career best.

She represented the sports club C.S. Carabinieri.
