= Andrea Jakab =

Romanian speed skater

Personal information
- Nationality: Romanian
- Born: 21 July 1981 (age 43); Târgu Mureș, Romania

Sport
- Sport: Speed skating

Andrea Jakab (born 21 July 1981) is a Romanian speed skater. She won a bronze medal at the 1997 European Youth Olympic Winter Days (1000 m speed skating), and took seventh place at the 2001 European Speed Skating Championships (5000 m speed skating). She competed in three events at the 2002 Winter Olympics.
