= Erik Zachrisson =

Swedish speed skater (born 1980)

Personal information
- Nationality: Swedish
- Born: 8 September 1980 (age 44); Norrköping, Sweden

Sport
- Sport: Speed skating

Erik Zachrisson (born 8 September 1980) is a Swedish speed skater. He competed in two events at the 2006 Winter Olympics.
