= 1997 European Youth Olympic Winter Days =

1997 edition of the European Youth Olympic Winter Festival

- Host city: Sundsvall
- Country: Sweden
- Nations: 41
- Athletes: 991
- Sport: 6
- Events: 27
- Opening: 7 February 1997
- Closing: 13 February 1997

Summer

Winter

The 1997 Winter European Youth Olympic Winter Days was an international multi-sport event held between 7 and 13 February 1997, in Sundsvall, Sweden.

== Sports ==
1997 European Youth Olympic Winter Days Sports Programme
- Alpine skiing (6)
- Biathlon (3)
- Cross-country skiing (5)
- Figure skating (3)
- Ice hockey (1)
- Short track speed skating (5)
- Speed skating (4)

=== Alpine skiing ===
Event	Gold	Silver	Bronze
Boys giant slalom	Christian Hainz; Italy	Anders Nilsson; Sweden	Daniel Rienda Contreras; Spain
Girls giant slalom	Anja Paerson; Sweden	Katja Wirth; Austria	Sabrina Schernthaner; Austria
Boys slalom	Björn Selander; Sweden	Alexandre Anselment; France	Christoph Alster; Austria
Girls slalom	Sandra Lochmatter; Switzerland	Anja Paerson; Sweden	Sara Fill; Italy
Boys parallel slalom	Manfred Gruber; Austria	Christian Hainz; Italy	Freddy Rech; France
Girls parallel slalom	Denise Karbon; Italy	Ingrid Rumpfhuber; Austria	Dagmara Krzyzynska; Poland

=== Biathlon ===
Event	Gold	Silver	Bronze
Boys 7,6 km	Hans Gjedrem; Norway	Jaroslav Vavra; Czech Republic	Timour Nurmiev; Russia
Girls 5,2 km	Irina Fomina; Russia	Nina Wilhelmsson; Sweden	Aleksandra Lanisek; Slovenia
Mixed relay 5,2 km	Team Russia; Russia	Team Italy; Italy	Team Slovakia; Slovakia

=== Cross-country skiing ===
Event	Gold	Silver	Bronze
Boys 10 km classic	Serguei Novikov; Russia	Reijo Nykänen; Finland	Vladimir Tokarev; Russia
Girls 7,5 km classic	Lina Andersson; Sweden	Irina Ivanova; Russia	Marit Bjørgen; Norway
Boys 10 km free	Maxim Odnodvortsev; Russia	Serguei Novikov; Russia	Johan Olsson; Sweden
Girls 7,5 km free	Lina Andersson; Sweden	Jana Svobodova; Czech Republic	Natalia Morilova; Russia
Mixed relay 4x5 km free	Team Sweden; Sweden	Team Russia; Russia	Team Czech Republic; Czech Republic

=== Figure skating ===
Event	Gold	Silver	Bronze
Boys	Evgeni Plushenko; Russia	Vakhtang Murvanidze; Georgia	Alexander Smokvin; Ukraine
Girls	Julia Soldatova; Russia	Julia Lautowa; Austria	Gwenaëlle Jullien; France
Ice dancing	Federica Faiella; Luciano Milo; Italy	Melanie Espejo; Michael Zenezini; France	Eliane Hugentobler; Daniel Hugentobler; Switzerland

=== Ice hockey ===
Event	Gold	Silver	Bronze
Boys	Team Russia; Russia	Team Sweden; Sweden	Team Finland; Finland

=== Short track speed skating ===
Event	Gold	Silver	Bronze
Boys 500 m	Simone Rodigari; Italy	Nicola Rodigari; Italy	Marek Hauptmann; Germany
Girls 500 m	Marta Capurso; Italy	Katia Zini; Italy	Joanna Williams; Great Britain
Boys 1000 m	Sebastian Praus; Germany	Marek Hauptmann; Germany	Cees Juffermans; Netherlands
Girls 1000 m	Marta Capurso; Italy	Katia Zini; Italy	Daniëlle Molendÿk; Netherlands
Mixed relay 3000 m	Team France; France	Team Russia; Russia	Team Ukraine; Ukraine

=== Speed skating ===
Event	Gold	Silver	Bronze
Boys 500 m	Eric Zachrisson; Sweden	Serguei Batiatine; Russia	Marcin Gralla; Poland
Girls 500 m	Wieteke Cramer; Netherlands	Helen van Goozen; Netherlands	Daniela Niederstatter; Italy
Boys 1500 m	Eric Zachrisson; Sweden	Marcin Gralla; Poland	Auke Kranenborg; Netherlands
Girls 1500 m	Helen van Goozen; Netherlands	Wieteke Cramer; Netherlands	Andrea Jakab; Romania

== Medal table ==
* Host nation (Sweden)

Rank	Nation	Gold	Silver	Bronze	Total
1	Russia (RUS)	7	5	3	15
2	Sweden (SWE)*	7	4	1	12
3	Italy (ITA)	6	5	2	13
4	Netherlands (NED)	2	2	3	7
5	Austria (AUT)	1	3	2	6
6	France (FRA)	1	2	2	5
7	Germany (GER)	1	1	1	3
8	Norway (NOR)	1	0	1	2
8	Switzerland (SUI)	1	0	1	2
10	Czech Republic (CZE)	0	2	1	3
11	Poland (POL)	0	1	2	3
12	Finland (FIN)	0	1	1	2
13	Georgia (GEO)	0	1	0	1
14	Ukraine (UKR)	0	0	2	2
15	Great Britain (GBR)	0	0	1	1
15	Romania (ROM)	0	0	1	1
15	Slovakia (SVK)	0	0	1	1
15	Slovenia (SLO)	0	0	1	1
15	Spain (SPA)	0	0	1	1
Totals (19 entries)		27	27	27	81
