= 1997 European Youth Summer Olympic Days =

1997 European Youth Olympic Days
- Host city: Lisbon
- Country: Portugal
- Nations: 47
- Athletes: 2,500
- Sport: 10
- Events: 85
- Opening: 18 July 1997
- Closing: 24 July 1997
- Opened by: Jorge Sampaio

Summer

Winter

The 1997 European Youth Summer Olympic Days was the fourth edition of multi-sport event for European youths between the ages of 12 and 18. It was held in Lisbon, Portugal from 18 to 24 July. A total of ten sports were contested.

== Sports ==
1997 European Youth Summer Olympic Days Sports Programme
- Athletics
- Basketball
- Cycling
- Football
- Gymnastics
- Handball
- Judo
- Swimming
- Volleyball
- Yachting

== Medal table ==
* Host nation (Portugal)

Rank	Nation	Gold	Silver	Bronze	Total
1	Russia (RUS)	18	13	11	42
2	Ukraine (UKR)	11	5	6	22
3	Great Britain (GBR)	10	2	11	23
4	Germany (GER)	6	4	9	19
5	France (FRA)	4	10	7	21
6	Italy (ITA)	4	6	6	16
7	Romania (ROU)	3	5	4	12
8	Austria (AUT)	3	1	3	7
9	Finland (FIN)	3	1	2	6
10	Sweden (SWE)	2	4	3	9
11	Spain (ESP)	2	2	3	7
12	Denmark (DEN)	2	2	0	4
13	Belgium (BEL)	2	1	8	11
14	Iceland (ISL)	2	1	1	4
14	Ireland (IRL)	2	1	1	4
16	Hungary (HUN)	2	1	0	3
17	Slovakia (SVK)	2	0	0	2
18	Belarus (BLR)	1	4	2	7
19	Netherlands (NED)	1	2	5	8
20	Greece (GRE)	1	2	3	6
21	Czech Republic (CZE)	1	2	1	4
22	Georgia (GEO)	1	1	1	3
23	Yugoslavia (FR Yugoslavia)	1	0	1	2
24	Cyprus (CYP)	1	0	0	1
25	Switzerland (SUI)	0	3	1	4
25	Turkey (TUR)	0	3	1	4
27	Slovenia (SLO)	0	2	2	4
28	Lithuania (LTU)	0	2	1	3
29	Poland (POL)	0	1	3	4
30	Portugal (POR)*	0	1	2	3
31	Israel (ISR)	0	1	1	2
32	Armenia (ARM)	0	1	0	1
32	Norway (NOR)	0	1	0	1
34	Bulgaria (BUL)	0	0	1	1
34	Croatia (CRO)	0	0	1	1
36	Latvia (LAT)	0	0	0	0
36	Liechtenstein (LIE)	0	0	0	0
36	Luxembourg (LUX)	0	0	0	0
36	Malta (MLT)	0	0	0	0
36	Moldova (MDA)	0	0	0	0
36	Monaco (MON)	0	0	0	0
36	San Marino (SMR)	0	0	0	0
Totals (42 entries)		85	85	101	271
