= 2017 European Youth Summer Olympic Festival =

2017 European Youth Olympic Festival
- Host city: Győr
- Country: Hungary
- Nations: 50
- Athletes: 3,675
- Sport: 10
- Events: 130
- Opening: 23 July 2017
- Closing: 30 July 2017
- Opened by: János Áder
- Main venue: ETO Park (opening ceremony)

Summer

Winter

The 2017 European Youth Summer Olympic Festival (Hungarian: 2017. évi nyári európai ifjúsági olimpiai fesztivál) was held in Győr, Hungary, between 23 July and 30 July 2017.

== Sports ==
- 130 set of medals

2017 European Youth Summer Olympic Festival Sports Programme
- Athletics (36)
- Basketball (2)
- Canoeing (16)
- Cycling (4)
- Gymnastics (14)
- Handball (2)
- Judo (18)
- Swimming (32)
- Tennis (4)
- Volleyball (2)

== Venues ==
Venue	Location	Sports
ETO Park	Győr	Opening Ceremony
Radnóti street Sport Centre	Győr	Athletics
Széchenyi István University sports hall	Győr	Basketball (Boys)
Bercsényi Miklós Secondary School gym hall	Győr	Basketball (Girls)
Aranypart, Püspökerdő	Győr	Canoeing
M85 expressway - Competition Centre:Győr City Hall	Győr	Cycling
Radnóti street Sport Centre – Gymnastics Hall	Győr	Gymnastics
Audi Aréna	Győr	Handball (Boys)
Magvassy Mihály Sportcsarnok	Győr	Handball (Girls)
Radnóti street Sport Centre - Judo Hall	Győr	Judo
Aqua Sports Centre	Győr	Swimming
Radnóti street Sport Centre - Tennis Centre	Győr	Tennis
Széchenyi István University sports hall	Győr	Volleyball
Aranypart	Győr	Closing Ceremony

== Schedule ==
The competition schedule for the 2017 European Youth Olympic Summer Festival is as follows:

OC	Opening ceremony	1	Event finals	CC	Closing ceremony	●	Event competitions

July	23 Sun	24 Mon	25 Tue	26 Wed	27 Thu	28 Fri	29 Sat	Events
Ceremonies	OC						CC	
Athletics		●	4	9	9	5	9	36
Basketball		●	●	●		●	2	2
Canoeing		●	8		●	8		16
Cycling			2		2			4
Gymnastics			1	1	2	5	5	14
Handball		●	●	●		●	2	2
Judo			4	4	4	4	2	18
Swimming		5	7	7	3	10		32
Tennis		●	●	●	●	●	4	4
Volleyball		●	●	●		●	2	2
Total events		5	18	29	20	24	34	130
Cumulative total		5	23	52	72	96	130	130
July	23 Sun	24 Mon	25 Tue	26 Wed	27 Thu	28 Fri	29 Sat	Events

== Participant nations ==
Participating National Olympic Committees
- Albania
- Andorra
- Armenia
- Austria
- Azerbaijan
- Belarus
- Belgium
- Bosnia and Herzegovina
- Bulgaria
- Croatia
- Cyprus
- Czech Republic
- Denmark
- Estonia (49)
- Finland
- France
- (Georgia (country)) Georgia
- Germany
- (United Kingdom) Great Britain
- Greece
- Hungary (161) (hosts)
- Iceland
- (Republic of Ireland) Ireland (16)
- Israel (36)
- Italy
- Kosovo (14)
- Latvia (53)
- Liechtenstein (5)
- Lithuania (102)
- Luxembourg (24)
- (North Macedonia) Macedonia
- Malta
- Moldova (35)
- Monaco (2)
- Montenegro
- Netherlands (98)
- Norway
- Poland
- Portugal
- Romania
- Russia (156)
- San Marino (6)
- Serbia (43)
- Slovakia
- Slovenia
- Spain (119)
- Sweden
- Switzerland
- Turkey
- Ukraine

== Medal table ==
* Host nation (Hungary)

Rank	Nation	Gold	Silver	Bronze	Total
1	Russia	30	19	12	61
2	Italy	14	11	13	38
3	Hungary*	13	14	14	41
4	Netherlands	8	6	2	16
5	Spain	7	4	4	15
6	Germany	5	8	4	17
7	Turkey	5	6	8	19
8	France	5	6	5	16
9	Belgium	5	0	2	7
10	Finland	4	1	6	11
11	Georgia	4	1	4	9
12	Belarus	3	5	7	15
13	Ukraine	3	4	1	8
14	Poland	3	3	4	10
15	Slovenia	3	2	2	7
16	Great Britain	3	1	6	10
17	Denmark	3	1	5	9
18	Switzerland	2	3	5	10
19	Norway	1	6	2	9
20	Sweden	1	4	6	11
21	Slovakia	1	4	5	10
22	Israel	1	3	0	4
23	Ireland	1	2	3	6
24	Serbia	1	2	2	5
25	Austria	1	1	3	5
26	Lithuania	1	1	0	2
27	Greece	1	0	1	2
27	Portugal	1	0	1	2
29	Romania	0	5	3	8
30	Croatia	0	2	2	4
31	Czech Republic	0	1	7	8
32	Estonia	0	1	2	3
33	Azerbaijan	0	1	1	2
33	Latvia	0	1	1	2
33	Moldova	0	1	1	2
36	Bulgaria	0	0	2	2
37	Andorra	0	0	1	1
37	Bosnia and Herzegovina	0	0	1	1
Totals (38 entries)		130	130	148	408

Note, 12 teams without medals were:

- Albania
- Armenia
- Cyprus
- Iceland
- Kosovo
- Liechtenstein
- Luxembourg
- North Macedonia
- Malta
- Montenegro
- Monaco
- San Marino

== Mascot ==
Hugoo the rooster will be the mascot for this edition of European Youth Summer Olympic Festival. Rooster was chosen as the mascot based on the local legend of the Iron Rooster.
