= 2005 European Youth Olympic Winter Festival =

2005 edition of the European Youth Olympic Winter Festival

- Host city: Monthey
- Country: Switzerland
- Nations: 41
- Athletes: 1,184
- Sport: 8
- Events: 35
- Opening: 24 January 2005
- Closing: 28 January 2005

Summer

Winter

The 2005 European Youth Olympic Winter Festival was held in Monthey, Switzerland, between 24 and 28 January 2005.

== Sports ==
2005 European Youth Olympic Winter Festival Sports Programme
- Alpine skiing (6)
- Biathlon (5)
- Cross-country skiing (7)
- Curling (2)
- Figure skating (2)
- Ice hockey (1)
- Short track speed skating (8)
- Snowboarding (4)

== Results ==
=== Alpine skiing ===
Competition	Gold	Silver	Bronze
Girls' slalom	(Germany) Laura Gruber	(Italy) Camilla Borsotti	(Austria) Anna Fenninger
Girls' giant slalom	(Austria) Eva-Maria Brem	(Italy) Camilla Borsotti	(France) Aude Aguilaniu
Girls' super-G	(Italy) Camilla Borsotti	(Austria) Eva-Maria Brem	(Austria) Anna Fenninger
Boys' slalom	(Austria) Bernhard Graf	(Slovenia) Matic Skube	(Switzerland) Lukas Karlen
Boys' giant slalom	(Finland) Niko Hermanen	(Italy) Hagen Patscheider	(Slovenia) Matic Skube
Boys' super-G	(Norway) John Reidar Steen	(Switzerland) Yoan Jaquet	(Switzerland) Mauro Caviezel

=== Biathlon ===
Competition	Gold	Silver	Bronze
Girls' sprint	(Norway) Julie Bonnevie-Svendsen	(Russia) Yelena Kozak	(Ukraine) Olena Pidhrushna
Girls' individual	(Norway) Julie Bonnevie-Svendsen	(France) Anaïs Bescond	(Russia) Yelena Kozak
Boys' sprint	(Russia) Anton Shipulin	(Austria) Dominik Landertinger	(Slovenia) Matej Brvar
Boys' individual	(Russia) Anton Shipulin	(Slovenia) Matej Brvar	(Austria) Dominik Landertinger
Mixed relay	Norway; Silje Hilmarsen; Julie Bonnevie-Svendsen; Anders Hennum; Arild Askestad	Austria; Iris Waldhuber; Elisabeth Mayer; Sven Grossegger; Dominik Landertinger	Ukraine; Anna Olkhovyk; Olena Pidhrushna; Vitaliy Kozhushko; Vitaliy Mohylenko

=== Cross-country skiing ===
Competition	Gold	Silver	Bronze
Girls' 5 km classical	(Russia) Diana Sapronova	(Czech Republic) Eliška Hájková	(Finland) Anne Kyllönen
Girls' 7,5 km freestyle	(Germany) Denise Herrmann	(Russia) Diana Sapronova	(Germany) Claudia Straube
Girls' sprint	(Russia) Svetlana Ovchynnikova	(Germany) Claudia Straube	(Finland) Anne Kyllönen
Boys' 7,5 km classical	(Finland) Lari Lehtonen	(Finland) Martti Jylhä	(Russia) Andrei Feller
Boys' 10 km freestyle	(Czech Republic) Ondřej Horyna	(Finland) Lari Lehtonen	(Belarus) Leanid Karniienka
Boys' sprint	(Finland) Martti Jylhä	(Italy) Alex Vanzetta	(Switzerland) Rolf Figi
Mixed relay	Czech Republic; Jan Rykr; Eliška Hájková; Ondřej Horyna; Lenka Munclingerová	Russia; Andrei Feller; Larisa Shaidurova; Illia Tretiakov; Diana Sapronova	Slovakia; Otcenas Otčenáš; Katarína Garajová; František Janečko; Barbara Blasková

=== Curling ===
Competition	Gold	Silver	Bronze
Boys'	United Kingdom	Switzerland	Germany
Girls'	Switzerland	Denmark	United Kingdom

=== Figure skating ===
Competition	Gold	Silver	Bronze
Boys'	(Sweden) Adrian Schultheiss	(France) Kim Lucine	(Russia) Nikita Mikhailov
Girls'	(Russia) Angelina Turenko	(Italy) Nicole Della Monica	(Ukraine) Kateryna Proida

=== Ice hockey ===
Competition	Gold	Silver	Bronze
Boys'	Czech Republic	Switzerland	Russia

=== Short track speed skating ===
Competition	Gold	Silver	Bronze
Girls' 500m	(Poland) Patrycja Maliszewska	(Hungary) Bernadett Heidum	(Germany) Julia Riedel
Girls' 1000m	(Hungary) Rózsa Darázs	(Germany) Julia Riedel	(Israel) Elena Pribysh
Girls' 1500m	(Hungary) Rózsa Darázs	(Hungary) Bernadett Heidum	(Germany) Julia Riedel
Girls' relay	Hungary; Rózsa Darázs; Zsofia Debreceni; Bernadett Heidum	Italy; Brigitte Marcoz; Cecilia Rainolter; Chiara Ferrari	Germany; Julia Riedel; Katja Prahl; Juliane Sandeck
Boys' 500m	(Italy) Marco Bertoldi	(France) Xavier Charpentier	(France) Maxime Châtaignier
Boys' 1000m	(France) Maxime Châtaignier	(Germany) Robert Seifert	(Hungary) Gábor Galambos
Boys' 1500m	(Hungary) Gábor Galambos	(Russia) Evgeni Koshulin	(France) Maxime Châtaignier
Boys' relay	France; Xavier Charpentier; Maxime Châtaignier; Jérémy Masson	Germany; Hannes Kröger; Robert Seifert; Torsten Kröger	Netherlands; Freek van der Wart; Jorrit Oosten; Mike Westerman

=== Snowboarding ===
Competition	Gold	Silver	Bronze
Girls' snowboardcross	(France) Océane Pozzo	(Switzerland) Sina Candrian	(Austria) Pia Meusburger
Girls' halfpipe	(France) Sophie Rodriguez	(Switzerland) Sina Candrian	(Switzerland) Simona Meiler
Boys' snowboardcross	(Austria) Matthias Schöpf	(Austria) Andreas Hacksteiner	(France) Tony Ramoin
Boys' halfpipe	(Finland) Peetu Piiroinen	(Norway) Stian Aannestad	(Norway) Tore Holvik

== Medal table ==
Rank	Country	Gold medal	Silver medal	Bronze medal	Total
1	Russia	5	4	4	13
2	France	4	3	4	11
3	Finland	4	2	2	8
4	Hungary	4	2	1	7
5	Norway	4	1	1	6
6	Austria	3	4	4	11
7	Czech Republic	3	1	0	4
8	Italy	2	6	0	8
9	Germany	2	4	5	11
10	Switzerland	1	5	4	10
11	United Kingdom	1	0	1	2
12	Poland	1	0	0	1
12	Sweden	1	0	0	1
14	Slovenia	0	2	2	4
15	Denmark	0	1	0	1
16	Ukraine	0	0	3	3
17	Belarus	0	0	1	1
17	Netherlands	0	0	1	1
17	Israel	0	0	1	1
17	Slovakia	0	0	1	1
Total		35	35	35	105
