= 2007 European Youth Olympic Winter Festival =

2007 edition of the European Youth Olympic Winter Festival

- Host city: Jaca
- Country: Spain
- Nations: 43
- Athletes: 1,284
- Sport: 6
- Events: 20
- Opening: 18 February 2007
- Closing: 24 February 2007
- Opened by: Marcelino Iglesias; President of the Government of Aragon
- Athlete's Oath: Bea Blanes
- Judge's Oath: Marta Olozagarra
- Torch lighter: Maria José Rianda
- Main venue: Pabellón de Hielo de Jaca

Summer

Winter

The 2007 Winter European Youth Olympic Festival was an international multi-sport event held in Jaca, Spain between 18 and 24 February 2007.

== Sports ==
2007 European Youth Olympic Winter Festival Sports Programme
- Alpine skiing (4)
- Biathlon (4)
- Cross-country skiing (5)
- Figure skating (2)
- Ice hockey (1)
- Snowboarding (4)

== Venues ==
Venues used in 2007 Winter European Youth Olympic Festival.

Venue	Location	Sports
Astún	Canfranc	Alpine skiing – slalom
Candanchú	Canfranc	Alpine skiing – giant slalom; cross-country skiing
Candanchú Biathlon Stadium	Canfranc	Biathlon
Aramón Formigal	Sallent de Gallego	Alpine skiing – super-G
Pabellón de Hielo de Jaca	Jaca	Ice hockey
Jaca Ice Rink	Jaca	Figure skating
Aramón Panticosa	Panticosa	Alpine skiing; snowboarding

== Mascot ==
The mascot for this edition of Winter European Youth Olympic Festival is Pinwi, a bird-dolphin hybrid wearing a blue jersey.

== Medalists ==
=== Alpine skiing ===
Event	Gold	Silver	Bronze
Boys giant slalom	Giovanni Borsotti; Italy	Nicolas Thoule; France	Knut Masdal; Norway
Girls giant slalom	Ilka Stuhec; Slovenia	Bernadette Schild; Austria	Sofija Novoselic; Croatia
Boys slalom	Knut Masdal; Norway	Tim Luescher; Switzerland	Brice Roger; France
Girls slalom	Ilka Stuhec; Slovenia	Margot Bailet; France	Bernadette Schild; Austria

=== Biathlon ===
Event	Gold	Silver	Bronze
Boys 10 km	Vladimir Alenishko; Belarus	Benjamin Thym; Austria	Benjamin Weger; Switzerland
Girls 7,5 km	Anne Domeinski; Germany	Miriam Gössner; Germany	Maren Hammerschmidt; Germany
Boys 7,5 km sprint	Vladimir Alenishko; Belarus	Benjamin Weger; Switzerland	Benjamin Riedlsperger; Austria
Girls 6 km sprint	Sophie Boilley; France	Leslie Mercier; France	Anne Domeinski; Germany

=== Cross-country skiing ===
Event	Gold	Silver	Bronze
Boys 7,5 km classic	Sebastian Eisenlauer; Germany	Mattia Pellegrin; Italy	Petr Sedov; Russia
Girls 5 km classic	Alevtina Tanygina; Russia	Marthe Kristoffersen; Norway	Johanna Heinanen; Finland
Boys 10 km free	Tim Tscharnke; Germany	Petr Sedov; Russia	Maxim Kovalev; Russia
Girls 7,5 km free	Marthe Kristoffersen; Norway	Kristin Gausen; Norway	Monique Siegel; Germany
Mixed relay 4x5 km free	Team Russia; Russia	Team Germany; Germany	Team Norway; Norway

=== Figure skating ===
Event	Gold	Silver	Bronze
Boys	Artem Grigoryev; Russia	Alexander Majorov; Sweden	Alexandre Briancon; France
Girls	Sonia Lafuente; Spain	Margarita Tertychnaya; Russia	Marcella De Trovato; Italy

=== Ice hockey ===
Event	Gold	Silver	Bronze
Boys	Team Russia; Russia	Team Finland; Finland	Team Switzerland; Switzerland

=== Snowboarding ===
Event	Gold	Silver	Bronze
Boys giant slalom	Lukas Mathies; Austria	Johann Stefaner; Austria	Dimitriy Bazanov; Russia
Girls giant slalom	Yvonne Schuetz; Switzerland	Margarita Garmashova; Russia	Ina Meschik; Austria
Boys parallel slalom	Radoslav Yankov; Bulgaria	Lukas Mathies; Austria	Dimitriy Bazanov; Russia
Girls parallel slalom	Ina Meschik; Austria	Nina Micic; Serbia	Yvonne Schuetz; Switzerland

== Medal table ==
* Host nation (Spain)

Rank	Nation	Gold	Silver	Bronze	Total
1	Russia (RUS)	4	3	4	11
2	Germany (GER)	3	3	3	9
3	Austria (AUT)	2	3	3	8
4	Norway (NOR)	2	2	2	6
5	Belarus (BLR)	2	0	0	2
5	Slovenia (SLO)	2	0	0	2
7	France (FRA)	1	3	2	6
8	Switzerland (SUI)	1	2	3	6
9	Italy (ITA)	1	1	1	3
10	Bulgaria (BUL)	1	0	0	1
10	Spain (ESP)*	1	0	0	1
12	Finland (FIN)	0	1	1	2
13	Serbia (SRB)	0	1	0	1
13	Sweden (SWE)	0	1	0	1
15	Croatia (CRO)	0	0	1	1
Totals (15 entries)		20	20	20	60
