= 2013 European Youth Summer Olympic Festival =

2013 European Youth Olympic Festival
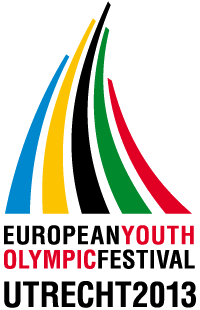
- Host city: Utrecht
- Country: Netherlands
- Nations: 49
- Athletes: 3,143
- Sport: 9
- Events: 111
- Opening: 14 July 2013
- Closing: 19 July 2013
- Opened by: King Willem Alexander
- Athlete's Oath: Aafke Soet
- Coach's Oath: Saskia van Hintum
- Torch lighter: Max Geesink
- Main venue: Galgenwaard Stadium

Summer

Winter

The 2013 European Youth Summer Olympic Festival was held in Utrecht, Netherlands, between 14 and 19 July 2013.

== Sports ==
There were contested nine sports:

2013 European Youth Summer Olympic Festival Sports Programme
- Athletics (36)
- Cycling (4)
- Basketball (2)
- Handball (2)
- Tennis (4)
- Judo (15)
- Gymnastics (14)
- Swimming (32)
- Volleyball (2)

== Venues ==
Venue	Location	Sports
Jaarbeurs Utrecht	Utrecht	Handball, volleyball, judo
Het Lint	Leidsche Rijn	Cycling
Galgenwaard Sports Centre	Utrecht	Gymnastics
Maarschalkerweerd	Utrecht	Athletics
Den Hommel Tennis Park	Utrecht	Tennis
De Krommerijn Swimming Pool	Utrecht	Swimming
Sports Centre Olympos	Utrecht	Basketball

== Schedule ==
The competition schedule for the 2017 European Youth Olympic Summer Festival is as follows:

OC	Opening ceremony	1	Event finals	CC	Closing ceremony	●	Event competitions

July	14 Sun	15 Mon	16 Tue	17 Wed	18 Thu	19 Fri	Events
Ceremonies	OC					CC	
Athletics		3	6	6	11	10	36
Basketball		●	●	●	●	2	2
Cycling			2		2		4
Gymnastics			1	1	2	10	14
Handball		●	●	●	●	2	2
Judo			4	4	4	3	15
Swimming			6	11	4	11	32
Tennis		●	●	●	●	4	4
Volleyball		●	●	●	●	2	2
Total events		3	19	22	23	44	111
Cumulative total		3	22	44	67	111	111
July	14 Sun	15 Mon	16 Tue	17 Wed	18 Thu	19 Fri	Events

== Participant nations ==
Participating National Olympic Committees
- Albania
- Andorra
- Armenia
- Austria
- Azerbaijan
- Belarus
- Belgium
- Bosnia and Herzegovina
- Bulgaria
- Croatia
- Cyprus
- Czech Republic
- Denmark
- Estonia (41)
- Finland
- France
- (Georgia (country)) Georgia
- Germany
- (United Kingdom) Great Britain
- Greece
- Hungary
- Iceland
- (Republic of Ireland) Ireland
- Israel
- Italy
- Latvia
- Liechtenstein
- Lithuania
- Luxembourg
- (North Macedonia) Macedonia
- Malta
- Moldova
- Monaco
- Montenegro
- Netherlands
- Norway
- Poland
- Portugal
- Romania
- Russia
- San Marino
- Serbia
- Slovakia
- Slovenia
- Spain
- Sweden
- Switzerland
- Turkey
- Ukraine

== Medal table ==
* Host nation (Netherlands)

Rank	Nation	Gold	Silver	Bronze	Total
1	Russia (RUS)	30	14	12	56
2	Great Britain (GBR)	9	14	8	31
3	France (FRA)	9	6	7	22
4	Hungary (HUN)	8	3	3	14
5	Italy (ITA)	7	3	12	22
6	Germany (GER)	5	8	3	16
7	Netherlands (NED)*	4	7	9	20
8	Turkey (TUR)	4	2	7	13
9	Poland (POL)	4	2	2	8
10	Spain (ESP)	3	4	11	18
11	Slovenia (SLO)	3	0	8	11
12	Romania (ROM)	2	7	7	16
13	Georgia (GEO)	2	3	3	8
14	Ireland (IRL)	2	2	1	5
15	Slovakia (SVK)	2	1	0	3
15	Switzerland (SUI)	2	1	0	3
17	Israel (ISR)	2	0	2	4
18	Azerbaijan (AZE)	2	0	1	3
19	Belgium (BEL)	1	4	2	7
20	Finland (FIN)	1	3	2	6
21	Belarus (BLR)	1	2	4	7
22	Czech Republic (CZE)	1	2	2	5
23	Denmark (DEN)	1	2	1	4
24	Montenegro (MNE)	1	1	1	3
24	Norway (NOR)	1	1	1	3
26	Serbia (SRB)	1	1	0	2
27	Lithuania (LTU)	1	0	1	2
27	Sweden (SWE)	1	0	1	2
29	Cyprus (CYP)	1	0	0	1
30	Ukraine (UKR)	0	6	8	14
31	Croatia (CRO)	0	3	3	6
32	Austria (AUT)	0	2	2	4
33	Greece (GRE)	0	2	1	3
34	Estonia (EST)	0	2	0	2
35	Bosnia and Herzegovina (BIH)	0	1	1	2
35	Moldova (MDA)	0	1	1	2
37	Bulgaria (BUL)	0	1	0	1
38	Latvia (LAT)	0	0	1	1
Totals (38 entries)		111	111	128	350
