= 2003 European Youth Summer Olympic Festival =

2003 European Youth Olympic Festival
- Host city: Paris
- Country: France
- Nations: 48
- Athletes: 2,500
- Sport: 10
- Events: 95
- Opening: 27 July 2003
- Closing: 3 August 2003
- Opened by: Jacques Chirac
- Main venue: Charléty Stadium

Summer

Winter

The 2003 European Youth Summer Olympic Festival (French: Festival olympique de la jeunesse européenne 2003) was the seventh edition of multi-sport event for European youths between the ages of 12 and 18. It was held in Paris, France, from 27 July to 3 August, with the opening and closing ceremonies at the Charléty Stadium. A total of ten sports were contested, featuring around 2000 athletes from 48 nations.

The hosting of the competition formed part of the buildup for the Paris bid for the 2012 Summer Olympics.

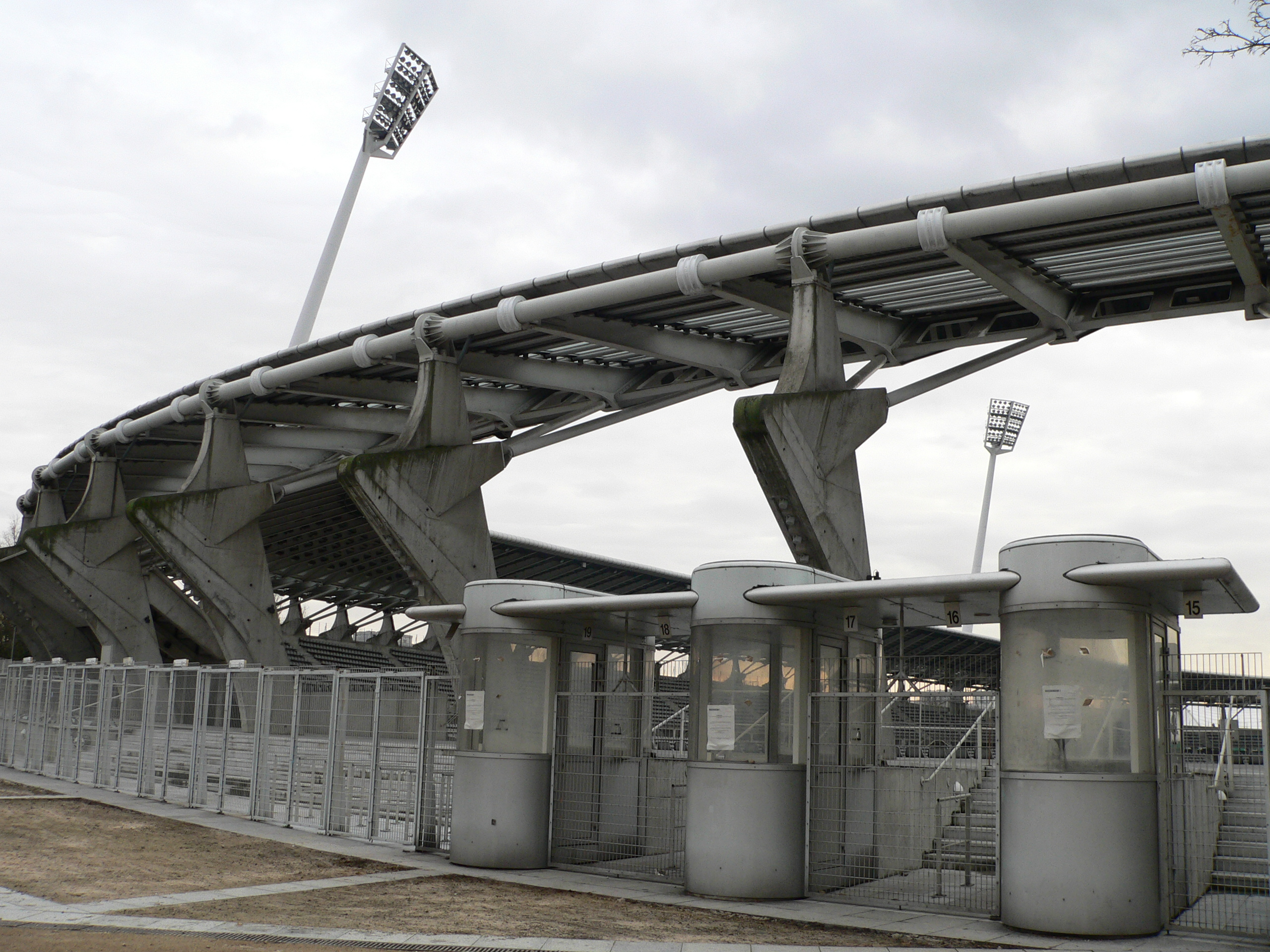
Charléty Stadium

== Sports ==
2003 European Youth Summer Olympic Festival Sports Programme
- Athletics
- Basketball
- Cycling
- Football
- Gymnastics
- Handball
- Judo
- Swimming
- Table tennis
- Volleyball

== Participating nations ==
Participating National Olympic Committees
- Albania
- Andorra
- Armenia
- Austria
- Azerbaijan
- Belarus
- Belgium
- Bosnia and Herzegovina
- Bulgaria
- Croatia
- Cyprus
- Czech Republic
- Denmark
- Estonia (44)
- Finland
- FYR Macedonia
- France
- Georgia
- Germany
- Great Britain
- Greece
- Hungary
- Iceland
- Ireland
- Israel
- Italy
- Latvia
- Liechtenstein
- Lithuania
- Luxembourg
- Malta
- Moldova
- Monaco
- Netherlands
- Norway
- Poland
- Portugal
- Romania
- Russia
- San Marino
- Serbia and Montenegro
- Slovakia
- Slovenia
- Spain
- Sweden
- Switzerland
- Turkey
- Ukraine

== Medal table ==
* Host nation (France)

Rank	Nation	Gold	Silver	Bronze	Total
1	Russia (RUS)	18	10	16	44
2	Hungary (HUN)	14	8	8	30
3	Romania (ROU)	7	1	5	13
4	Great Britain (GBR)	6	6	11	23
5	Ukraine (UKR)	5	5	7	17
6	Italy (ITA)	5	4	4	13
7	France (FRA)*	4	4	5	13
8	Portugal (POR)	4	2	1	7
9	Germany (GER)	3	9	8	20
10	Belgium (BEL)	3	3	0	6
11	Lithuania (LTU)	3	1	4	8
12	Netherlands (NED)	2	5	5	12
13	Croatia (CRO)	2	4	0	6
14	Czech Republic (CZE)	2	3	3	8
15	Georgia (GEO)	2	3	2	7
16	Poland (POL)	2	1	6	9
17	Slovakia (SVK)	2	0	1	3
18	Denmark (DEN)	2	0	0	2
19	Spain (ESP)	1	4	2	7
20	Sweden (SWE)	1	3	2	6
21	Latvia (LAT)	1	3	0	4
22	Greece (GRE)	1	1	2	4
23	Estonia (EST)	1	1	1	3
24	Belarus (BLR)	1	0	7	8
25	Israel (ISR)	1	0	1	2
25	Norway (NOR)	1	0	1	2
27	Moldova (MDA)	1	0	0	1
28	Serbia and Montenegro (SCG)	0	4	0	4
29	Azerbaijan (AZE)	0	2	3	5
30	Slovenia (SLO)	0	2	2	4
31	Austria (AUT)	0	2	0	2
31	Switzerland (SUI)	0	2	0	2
33	Bulgaria (BUL)	0	1	1	2
33	Ireland (IRL)	0	1	1	2
35	Luxembourg (LUX)	0	1	0	1
36	Finland (FIN)	0	0	2	2
36	Turkey (TUR)	0	0	2	2
38	Armenia (ARM)	0	0	1	1
38	Cyprus (CYP)	0	0	1	1
Totals (39 entries)		95	96	115	306

- Non-medalling nations:
  - Andorra
  - Albania
  - Bosnia and Herzegovina
  - Macedonia
  - Iceland
  - Liechtenstein
  - Malta
  - Monaco
  - San Marino
