= 2001 European Youth Olympic Winter Festival =

- Host city: Vuokatti
- Country: Finland
- Nations: 40
- Athletes: 1,111
- Sport: 7
- Events: 28
- Opening: 11 March 2001
- Closing: 15 March 2001

Summer

Winter

The 2001 Winter European Youth Olympic Winter Festival was an international multi-sport event held between 11 and 15 March 2001, in Vuokatti, Finland.

== Sports ==
2001 European Youth Olympic Winter Festival Sports Programme
- Alpine skiing (4)
- Biathlon (5)
- Cross-country skiing (7)
- Ice hockey (1)
- Speed skating (4)
- Ski jumping (2)
- Snowboarding (4)

== Medalists ==
=== Alpine skiing ===
Event	Gold	Silver	Bronze
Boys slalom	Patrick Kueng; Switzerland	Manuel Sandbichler; Italy	Kurt Pittschieler; Italy
Girls slalom	Jessica Lindell-Vikarby; Sweden	Chiara Costazza; Italy	Therese Borssen; Sweden
Boys parallel slalom	Manuel Sandbichler; Italy	Thomas Perrier; France	Steve Missillier; France
Girls parallel slalom	Ana Drev; Slovenia	Michaela Kirchgasser; Austria	Tone Jersin Ansnes; Norway

=== Biathlon ===
Event	Gold	Silver	Bronze
Boys 12 km	Tobias Strohm; Germany	Ondrej Moravec; Czech Republic	Henri Leinonen; Finland
Girls 10 km	Kathleen Lindau; Germany	Maria Kosinova; Russia	Maija Hietamies; Finland
Boys 7,5 km sprint	Alexandre Koudriachev; Russia	Andrei Nikolaev; Belarus	Robert Wick; Germany
Girls 6 km sprint	Sabine Hocheder; Germany	Kathleen Lindau; Germany	Mervi Markkanen; Finland
Mixed relay 4x5 km	Team Russia; Russia	Team Czech Republic; Czech Republic	Team Germany; Germany

=== Cross-country skiing ===
Event	Gold	Silver	Bronze
Boys 10 km classic	Vadim Sannikov; Russia	Hans Gronnvoll; Norway	Luca Orlandi; Italy
Girls 5 km classic	Petra Markelova; Czech Republic	Tatiana Chugaeva; Russia	Iryna Nafranovich; Belarus
Boys 15 km free	Nikolai Fokin; Russia	Vadim Sannikov; Russia	Federico Clementi; Italy
Girls 10 km free	Tatiana Chugaeva; Russia	Irina Terentjeva; Lithuania	Valentina Novikova; Russia
Boys sprint	Yuri Ostrovski; Russia	Oyvind Anmarkrud; Norway	Vadim Sannikov; Russia
Girls sprint	Tatiana Chugaeva; Russia	Maria Magnusson; Sweden	Vesna Fabjan; Slovenia
Mixed relay 5x10 km free	Team Russia; Russia	Team Finland; Finland	Team Norway; Norway

=== Ice hockey ===
Event	Gold	Silver	Bronze
Boys	Team Russia; Russia	Team Switzerland; Switzerland	Team Finland; Finland

=== Ski jumping ===
Event	Gold	Silver	Bronze
Boys K90	Janne Happonen; Finland	Maximilian Mechler; Germany	Akseli Kokkonen; Finland
Girls K90	Daniela Iraschko; Austria	Helena Olsson; Sweden	Anette Sagen; Norway
Team K90	Team Finland; Finland	Team Austria; Austria	Team France; France

=== Snowboarding ===
Event	Gold	Silver	Bronze
Boys Cross	Francesco Sandrini; Italy	Dominik Fiegl; Austria	Michael Schreilechner; Austria
Girls Cross	Thea Stenshagen; Norway	Verena Domenig; Austria	Heidi Kurkinen; Finland
Boys Half-pipe	Toni Marcus Turunen; Finland	Iikka Bäckström; Finland	Antti Autti; Finland
Girls Half-pipe	Paulina Ligocka; Poland	Elin Viken Holvik; Norway	Heidi Kurkinen; Finland

=== Speed skating ===
Event	Gold	Silver	Bronze
Boys 500 m	Alessandro Magnabosco; Italy	Remco Olde Heuvel; Netherlands	Konrad Niedzwiedzki; Poland
Girls 500 m	Ioulia Bouchoueva; Russia	Marcela Kramarova; Czech Republic	Maren Haugli; Norway
Boys 1500 m	Remco Olde Heuvel; Netherlands	Konrad Niedzwiedzki; Poland	Ihor Makavetski; Belarus
Girls 1000 m	Ioulia Bouchoueva; Russia	Mari Hemmer; Norway	Mariska Huisman; Netherlands

== Medal table ==
* Host nation (Finland)

Rank	Nation	Gold	Silver	Bronze	Total
1	Russia (RUS)	11	3	2	16
2	Finland (FIN)*	3	2	8	13
3	Italy (ITA)	3	2	3	8
4	Germany (GER)	3	2	2	7
5	Norway (NOR)	1	4	4	9
6	Austria (AUT)	1	4	1	6
7	Czech Republic (CZE)	1	3	0	4
8	Sweden (SWE)	1	2	1	4
9	Netherlands (NED)	1	1	1	3
9	Poland (POL)	1	1	1	3
11	Switzerland (SUI)	1	1	0	2
12	Slovenia (SLO)	1	0	1	2
13	Belarus (BLR)	0	1	2	3
13	France (FRA)	0	1	2	3
15	Lithuania (LTU)	0	1	0	1
Totals (15 entries)		28	28	28	84
