= 2009 European Youth Summer Olympic Festival =

2009 European Youth Olympic Festival
- Host city: Tampere
- Country: Finland
- Nations: 49
- Athletes: 3,302
- Sport: 9
- Events: 109
- Opening: 19 July 2009
- Closing: 24 July 2009
- Opened by: Tarja Halonen
- Torch lighter: Pertti Ukkola
- Main venue: Tampere Ice Stadium (opening); Tampere Stadium (closing)

Summer

Winter

The 2009 European Youth Summer Olympic Festival was held in Tampere, Finland.

== Sports ==
2009 European Youth Summer Olympic Festival Sports Programme
- Athletics (36)
- Basketball (2)
- Cycling (3)
- Gymnastics
- Handball (2)
- Judo (15)
- Swimming
- Tennis (4)
- Volleyball (2)

== Mascot ==
The mascot for the 2009 European Youth Olympic Festival is Finx, a Eurasian lynx.

== Venues ==
Eight venues were used in this edition of European Youth Olympic Festival.

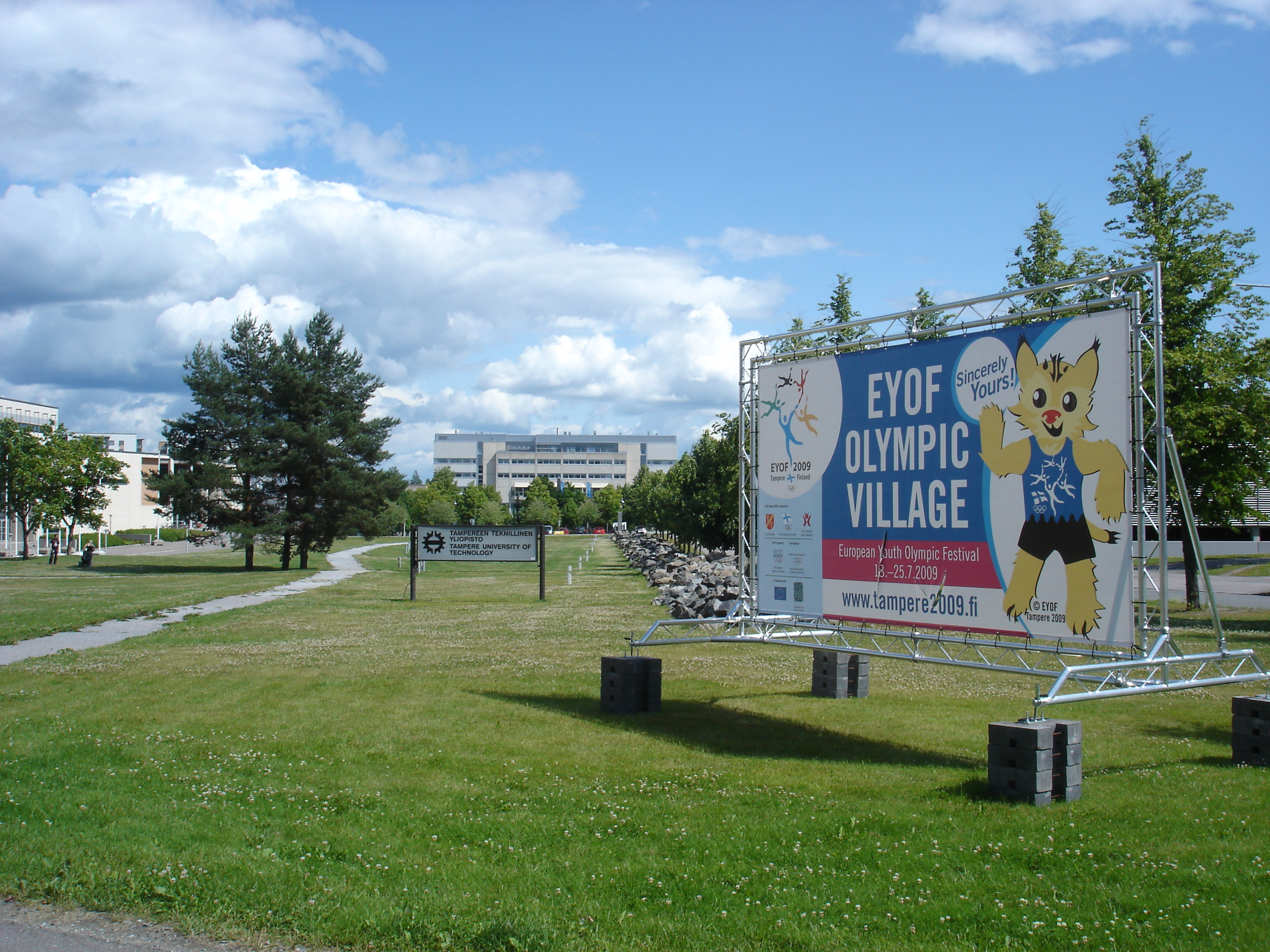
EYOF olympic village at Tampere University of Technology Campus in 2009. The mascot can be seen on the billboard.

Venue	Location	Sports
Tampere Stadium	Tampere	Athletics
Tampere Exhibition and Sports Centre	Tampere	Gymnastics, Handball, Volleyball
Tampere Ice Stadium	Tampere	Judo
Tampere Swimming Centre	Tampere	Swimming
Pyynikki Ball Games Centre	Tampere	Basketball
Hervanta Leisure Centre	Tampere	Basketball
Tampere Tennis Centre	Tampere	Tennis
Roads of Tampere	Tampere	Cycling

== Participating nations ==
Participating National Olympic Committees
- Albania
- Andorra
- Armenia
- Austria
- Azerbaijan
- Belarus
- Belgium
- Bosnia and Herzegovina
- Bulgaria
- Croatia
- Cyprus
- Czech Republic
- Denmark
- Estonia (43)
- Finland
- France
- Georgia
- Germany
- Great Britain
- Greece
- Hungary
- Iceland
- Ireland
- Israel
- Italy
- Latvia
- Liechtenstein
- Lithuania
- Luxembourg
- Macedonia
- Malta
- Moldova
- Monaco
- Montenegro
- Netherlands
- Norway
- Poland
- Portugal
- Romania
- Russia
- San Marino
- Serbia
- Slovakia
- Slovenia
- Spain
- Sweden
- Switzerland
- Turkey
- Ukraine

== Medal table ==
* Host nation (Finland)

Rank	Nation	Gold	Silver	Bronze	Total
1	Russia (RUS)	18	10	8	36
2	Germany (GER)	10	8	7	25
3	Great Britain (GBR)	10	6	9	25
4	Belgium (BEL)	9	5	4	18
5	Spain (ESP)	9	3	2	14
6	Italy (ITA)	8	7	7	22
7	France (FRA)	7	10	4	21
8	Turkey (TUR)	4	1	6	11
9	Romania (ROU)	3	8	5	16
10	Poland (POL)	3	4	7	14
11	Serbia (SRB)	2	5	3	10
12	Ukraine (UKR)	2	3	8	13
13	Hungary (HUN)	2	3	5	10
13	Netherlands (NED)	2	3	5	10
15	Czech Republic (CZE)	2	3	2	7
16	Switzerland (SUI)	2	2	8	12
17	Denmark (DEN)	2	2	5	9
18	Austria (AUT)	2	2	4	8
19	Azerbaijan (AZE)	2	1	1	4
19	Slovakia (SVK)	2	1	1	4
21	Finland (FIN)*	1	5	1	7
22	Ireland (IRL)	1	3	3	7
23	Belarus (BLR)	1	2	1	4
24	Lithuania (LTU)	1	2	0	3
25	Portugal (POR)	1	1	1	3
26	Estonia (EST)	1	0	1	2
26	Slovenia (SLO)	1	0	1	2
28	Moldova (MDA)	1	0	0	1
29	Latvia (LAT)	0	2	2	4
30	Georgia (GEO)	0	2	1	3
31	Bulgaria (BUL)	0	1	2	3
31	Croatia (CRO)	0	1	2	3
33	Armenia (ARM)	0	1	1	2
33	Cyprus (CYP)	0	1	1	2
33	Israel (ISR)	0	1	1	2
36	Sweden (SWE)	0	1	0	1
37	Greece (GRE)	0	0	4	4
Totals (37 entries)		109	110	123	342
