= 2003 European Youth Olympic Winter Festival =

2003 edition of the European Youth Olympic Winter Festival

- Host city: Bled
- Country: Slovenia
- Nations: 41
- Athletes: 1,242
- Sport: 7
- Events: 28
- Opening: 25 January 2003
- Closing: 31 January 2003

Summer

Winter

The 2003 Winter European Youth Olympic Winter Festival was an international multi-sport event held between 25 and 31 January 2003, in Bled, Slovenia.

== Sports ==
2003 European Youth Olympic Winter Festival Sports Programme
- Alpine skiing (8)
- Biathlon (5)
- Cross-country skiing (5)
- Figure skating (4)
- Ice hockey (1)
- Nordic combined (2)
- Ski jumping (2)

== Medalists ==
=== Alpine skiing ===
Event	Gold	Silver	Bronze
Boys giant slalom	Mons Bjoerge; Norway	Lars-Mikkel Bjoerge; Norway	Peter Brenna; Norway
Girls giant slalom	Ana Jelusic; Croatia	Lene Loeseth; Norway	Maria Pietilae-Holmner; Sweden
Boys slalom	Lars-Mikkel Bjoerge; Norway	Krystof Kryzl; Czech Republic	Mons Bjoerge; Norway
Girls slalom	Lene Loeseth; Norway	Martina Geisler; Austria	Grete Eliassen; Norway
Boys super-G	Werner Heel; Italy	Lars-Mikkel Bjoerge; Norway	Gianluca Olivero; Italy
Girls super-G	Corinne Anselmet; France	Kathrin Zettel; Austria	Simone Streng; Austria
Boys parallel slalom	Michael Sablatnik; Austria	Sandro Viletta; Switzerland	Krystof Kryzl; Czech Republic
Girls parallel slalom	Maria Pietilae-Holmner; Sweden	Larissa Hoffer; Italy	Emilie Edvinger; Sweden

=== Biathlon ===
Event	Gold	Silver	Bronze
Boys 10 km	Kirill Shcherbakov; Russia	Emil Hegle Svendsen; Norway	Peter Dokl; Slovenia
Girls 7,5 km	Lada Duskova; Czech Republic	Tereza Hlavsova; Czech Republic	Kathrin Hitzer; Germany
Boys 7,5 km sprint	Kirill Shcherbakov; Russia	Danil Asylguzhin; Russia	Emil Hegle Svendsen; Norway
Girls 6 km sprint	Tereza Hlavsova; Czech Republic	Petra Moravcova; Czech Republic	Lada Duskova; Czech Republic
Mixed relay 4x6 km	Team Germany; Germany	Team Russia; Russia	Team Czech Republic; Czech Republic

=== Cross-country skiing ===
Event	Gold	Silver	Bronze
Boys 7,5 km classic	Even Skjelbostad Sletten; Norway	Ole Christian Mork; Norway	Marcus Kellner; Sweden
Girls 7,5 km classic	Evgeniya Bazarnova; Russia	Betty Ann Bjerkreim Nilsen; Norway	Emilia Soudunsaari; Finland
Boys 10 km free	Mikhail Semenov; Russia	Roman Chekelkin; Russia	Václav Kupilik; Czech Republic
Girls 7,5 km free	Evgeniya Bazarnova; Russia	Natalia Ilyina; Russia	Julia Tihonova; Russia
Mixed relay 4x5 km free	Team Norway; Norway	Team Russia; Russia	Team Italy; Italy

=== Figure skating ===
Event	Gold	Silver	Bronze
Boys	Sergey Dobrin; Russia	Yannick Ponsero; France	Radomir Soumar; Germany
Girls	Katharina Häcker; Germany	Lina Johansson; Sweden	Viktória Pavuk; Hungary
Pairs	Arina Ushakova; Alexander Popov; Russia	Rebecca Handke; Daniel Wende; Germany	Julia Beloglazova; Andriy Bekh; Ukraine
Ice dancing	Natalia Mikhailova; Arkadi Sergeev; Russia	Christina Beier; William Beier; Germany	Alexandra Zaretsky; Roman Zaretsky; Israel

=== Ice hockey ===
Event	Gold	Silver	Bronze
Boys	Team Russia; Russia	Team Switzerland; Switzerland	Team Finland; Finland

=== Nordic combined ===
Event	Gold	Silver	Bronze
Boys	Jason Lamy Chappuis; France	Mitja Oranic; Slovenia	Primoz Zupan; Slovenia
Team	Team Slovenia; Slovenia	Team France; France	Team Norway; Norway

=== Ski jumping ===
Event	Gold	Silver	Bronze
Boys K90	Jon Aaraas; Norway	Zvonko Kordac; Slovenia	Rok Benkovic; Slovenia
Girls K90	Anette Sagen; Norway	Ulrike Graessler; Germany	Katrin Stefsner; Austria
Team K90	Team Slovenia; Slovenia	Team Norway; Norway	Team Austria; Austria

== Medal table ==
* Host nation (Slovenia)

Rank	Nation	Gold	Silver	Bronze	Total
1	Russia (RUS)	9	5	1	15
2	Norway (NOR)	7	7	5	19
3	Czech Republic (CZE)	2	3	4	9
4	Germany (GER)	2	3	2	7
5	Austria (AUT)	2	2	3	7
5	Slovenia (SLO)*	2	2	3	7
7	France (FRA)	2	2	0	4
8	Sweden (SWE)	1	1	3	5
9	Croatia (CRO)	1	0	0	1
10	Switzerland (SUI)	0	2	0	2
11	Italy (ITA)	0	1	2	3
12	Finland (FIN)	0	0	2	2
13	Hungary (HUN)	0	0	1	1
13	Israel (ISR)	0	0	1	1
13	Ukraine (UKR)	0	0	1	1
Totals (15 entries)		28	28	28	84
