= 1993 European Youth Summer Olympic Days =

1993 European Youth Olympic Days
- Host city: Valkenswaard
- Country: Netherlands
- Nations: 43
- Athletes: 1,874
- Sport: 10
- Events: 86
- Opening: 3 July 1993
- Closing: 9 July 1993
- Opened by: Prince Willem Alexander Netherlands

Summer

Winter

The 1993 European Youth Summer Olympic Days was the second edition of multi-sport event for European youths between the ages of 12 and 18. It was held in Valkenswaard, Netherlands from 3 to 9 July.

== Sports ==
A total of ten sports were contested by 1874 athletes representing 43 European nations. Table tennis was dropped from the 1991 program, while cycling and gymnastics made their first appearance.

1993 European Youth Summer Olympic Days Sports Programme
- Athletics
- Basketball
- Cycling
- Field hockey
- Football
- Gymnastics
- Judo
- Swimming
- Tennis
- Volleyball

== Medal table ==
* Host nation (Netherlands)

Rank	Nation	Gold	Silver	Bronze	Total
1	Russia (RUS)	9	10	6	25
2	Spain (ESP)	9	6	5	20
3	Italy (ITA)	8	6	8	22
4	Netherlands (NED)*	6	6	5	17
5	Romania (ROU)	6	4	7	17
6	Great Britain (GBR)	5	7	9	21
7	Ukraine (UKR)	5	5	7	17
8	France (FRA)	5	2	4	11
9	Hungary (HUN)	4	3	3	10
10	Germany (GER)	4	3	2	9
11	Belgium (BEL)	4	1	3	8
12	Poland (POL)	3	2	3	8
13	Czech Republic (CZE)	2	2	3	7
14	Croatia (CRO)	2	1	1	4
15	Bulgaria (BUL)	1	2	3	6
16	Greece (GRE)	1	2	2	5
17	Azerbaijan (AZE)	1	2	1	4
18	Sweden (SWE)	1	1	3	5
19	Ireland (IRL)	1	1	1	3
20	Slovakia (SVK)	1	1	0	2
21	Cyprus (CYP)	1	0	0	1
21	Estonia (EST)	1	0	0	1
23	Belarus (BLR)	0	2	3	5
23	Slovenia (SLO)	0	2	3	5
25	Portugal (POR)	0	2	1	3
26	Denmark (DEN)	0	2	0	2
27	Switzerland (SUI)	0	1	2	3
28	Austria (AUT)	0	1	1	2
28	Georgia (GEO)	0	1	1	2
30	Moldova (MDA)	0	0	1	1
Totals (30 entries)		80	78	88	246
