= Estonia at the European Youth Olympic Festival =

- IOC code: EST
- NOC: Estonian Olympic Committee
- Website: www.eok.ee (in Estonian)
- Medals Ranked 29th: Gold 18 Silver 24 Bronze 17 Total 59

Other related appearances
- Soviet Union (1991)

Estonia first participated at the European Youth Olympic Festival in 1993 and has earned medals at both summer and winter festivals.

== Medal tables ==
=== Medals by Summer Youth Olympic Festival ===
Games	Athletes	Gold	Silver	Bronze	Total	Rank
(Belgium) 1991 Brussels	Did not participate					
(Netherlands) 1993 Valkenswaard	?	1	0	0	1	21
(United Kingdom) 1995 Bath	33	1	1	2	4	20
(Portugal) 1997 Lisbon	27	0	0	0	0	–
(Denmark) 1999 Esbjerg	22	0	2	1	3	31
(Spain) 2001 Murcia	26	0	0	0	0	–
(France) 2003 Paris	44	1	1	1	3	23
(Italy) 2005 Lignano Sabbiadoro	58	4	1	0	5	11
(Serbia) 2007 Belgrade	68	1	1	0	2	24
(Finland) 2009 Tampere	43	1	0	1	2	26
(Turkey) 2011 Trabzon	44	0	0	0	0	–
(Netherlands) 2013 Utrecht	41	0	2	0	2	34
(Georgia (country)) 2015 Tbilisi	32	1	0	0	1	30
(Hungary) 2017 Győr	49	0	1	2	3	32
(Azerbaijan) 2019 Baku	44	3	0	2	5	15
(Slovakia) 2022 Banská Bystrica	40	0	3	0	3	28
(Slovenia) 2023 Maribor	51	1	3	4	8	24
(North Macedonia) 2025 Skopje	53	1	0	0	1	35
Total		15	15	13	43	31

=== Medals by Winter Youth Olympic Festival ===
Games	Athletes	Gold	Silver	Bronze	Total	Rank
(Italy) 1993 Aosta	8	0	1	1	2	13
1995 Andorra la Vella	?	0	1	0	1	11
(Sweden) 1997 Sundsvall	22	0	0	0	0	–
(Slovakia) 1999 Poprad-Tatry	20	0	0	0	0	–
(Finland) 2001 Vuokatti	21	0	0	0	0	–
(Slovenia) 2003 Bled	23	0	0	0	0	–
(Switzerland) 2005 Monthey	13	0	0	0	0	–
(Spain) 2007 Jaca	19	0	0	0	0	–
(Poland) 2009 Slask Beskidy	23	1	0	0	1	12
(Czech Republic) 2011 Liberec	19	0	0	0	0	–
(Romania) 2013 Braşov	16	0	0	1	1	16
(Austria) / 2015 Vorarlberg and Liechtenstein	21	0	0	0	0	–
(Turkey) 2017 Erzurum	19	0	1	0	1	13
(Bosnia and Herzegovina) 2019 Sarajevo and Istočno Sarajevo	17	0	1	0	1	17
(Finland) 2022 Vuokatti	19	1	0	0	1	11
(Italy) 2023 Friuli-Venezia Giulia	19	0	1	1	2	21
(Georgia (country)) 2025 Borjomi-Bakuriani	22	1	4	1	6	10
Total		3	9	4	16	19

== List of medalists ==
=== Summer Festivals ===
Medal	Name	Games	Sport	Event	Ref
Gold	Aleksei Budõlin	1993 Valkenswaard	Judo	Boys −78 kg	
Gold	Martin Padar	1995 Bath	Judo	Boys' +78 kg	
Silver	Meelis Tammre	1995 Bath	Athletics	Boys' 2000 metres steeplechase	
Bronze	Anton Fedorin	1995 Bath	Judo	Boys' −60 kg	
Bronze	Andrus Kõrgvee	1995 Bath	Judo	Boys' −71 kg	
Silver	Vladimir Labzin	1999 Esbjerg	Swimming	Boys' 200m breaststroke	
Silver	Leonid Patlatenko	1999 Esbjerg	Judo	Boys' −55 kg	
Bronze	Tiiu Asper	1999 Esbjerg	Judo	Girls' −52 kg	
Gold	Margus Hunt	2003 Paris	Athletics	Boys' discus throw	
Silver	Evelin Sosnovski	2003 Paris	Athletics	Girls' 400 metres hurdles	
Bronze	Tanel Kangert	2003 Paris	Cycling	Boys' individual time trial	
Gold	Kaire Leibak	2005 Lignano Sabbiadoro	Athletics	Girls' long jump	
Gold	Kaire Leibak	2005 Lignano Sabbiadoro	Athletics	Girls' triple jump	
Gold	Ebe Reier	2005 Lignano Sabbiadoro	Athletics	Girls' 200 metres	
Gold	Georgi Ladõgin	2005 Lignano Sabbiadoro	Judo	Boys' −73 kg	
Silver	Raine Kuningas	2005 Lignano Sabbiadoro	Athletics	Girls' javelin throw	
Gold	Grigori Minaškin	2007 Belgrade	Judo	Boys' −81 kg	
Silver	Estonia (Kaarel Jõeväli, Andres Saaremöts, Sander Sooäär & Richard Pulst)	2007 Belgrade	Athletics	Boys' 4 × 100 metres relay	
Gold	Liina Laasma	2009 Tampere	Athletics	Girls' javelin throw	
Bronze	Rasmus Mägi	2009 Tampere	Athletics	Boys' 400 metres hurdles	
Silver	Hans-Christian Hausenberg	2013 Utrecht	Athletics	Boys' pole vault	
Silver	Mattias Siimar & Kristofer Siimar	2013 Utrecht	Tennis	Boys' doubles	
Gold	Kregor Zirk	2015 Tbilisi	Swimming	Boys' 100m butterfly	
Silver	Ken-Mark Minkovski	2017 Győr	Athletics	Boys' long jump	
Bronze	Gleb Karpenko	2017 Győr	Cycling	Boys' individual time trial	
Bronze	Carol Plakk & Katriin Saar	2017 Győr	Tennis	Girls' doubles	
Gold	Madis Mihkels	2019 Baku	Cycling	Boys' road race	
Gold	Madis Mihkels	2019 Baku	Cycling	Boys' individual time trial	
Gold	Jekaterina Mirotvortseva	2019 Baku	Athletics	Girls' 5000 metres walk	
Bronze	Laura Lizette Sander	2019 Baku	Cycling	Girls' individual time trial	
Bronze	Viljar Lipard	2019 Baku	Judo	Boys' −60 kg	
Silver	Heti Väät	2022 Banská Bystrica	Athletics	Girls' javelin throw	
Silver	Viola Hambidge	2022 Banská Bystrica	Athletics	Girls' heptathlon	
Silver	Karl Kristjan Pohlak	2022 Banská Bystrica	Athletics	Boys' pole vault	
Gold	Miia Ott	2023 Maribor	Athletics	Girls' 100 metres	
Silver	Karl Kristjan Pohlak	2023 Maribor	Athletics	Boys' pole vault	
Silver	Valeria Smirnova	2023 Maribor	Athletics	Girls' high jump	
Silver	Emma Melis Aktas	2023 Maribor	Judo	Girls' +70 kg	
Bronze	Tristan Konso	2023 Maribor	Athletics	Boys' 110 metres hurdles	
Bronze	Savva Novikov	2023 Maribor	Athletics	Boys' 400 metres hurdles	
Bronze	Miia Ott	2023 Maribor	Athletics	Girls' 200 metres	
Bronze	Heti Väät	2023 Maribor	Athletics	Girls' javelin throw	

=== Winter Festivals ===
Medal	Name	Games	Sport	Event
Silver	Kristina Šmigun	1993 Aosta	Cross country skiing	7.5 km freestyle
Bronze	Kristina Šmigun	1993 Aosta	Cross country skiing	5 km classic
Silver	Katrin Šmigun	1995 Andorra la Vella	Cross country skiing	7.5 km freestyle
Gold	Viktor Romanenkov	2009 Silesian Voivodeship	Figure skating	Boys'
Bronze	Tuuli Tomingas	2013 Braşov	Biathlon	Girls' 10 km individual
Silver	Kristo Siimer	2017 Erzurum	Biathlon	Boys' 7.5 km sprint
Silver	Mihhail Selevko	2019 Sarajevo and Istočno Sarajevo	Figure skating	Boys'
Gold	Arlet Levandi	2022 Vuokatti	Figure skating	Boys'
Silver	Stefan Sorokin	2023 Friuli-Venezia Giulia	Freestyle skiing	Boys' slopestyle
Bronze	Henry Sildaru	2023 Friuli-Venezia Giulia	Freestyle skiing	Boys' big air
Gold	Simona Revjagin	2025 Borjomi-Bakuriani	Freestyle skiing	Girls' slopestyle
Silver	Laura Anga	2025 Borjomi-Bakuriani	Snowboarding	Girls' slopestyle
Silver	Vladislav Churakov	2025 Borjomi-Bakuriani	Figure skating	Boys'
Silver	Elina Goidina	2025 Borjomi-Bakuriani	Figure skating	Girls'
Silver	Simona Revjagin	2025 Borjomi-Bakuriani	Freestyle skiing	Girls' big air
Bronze	Gerda Kivil	2025 Borjomi-Bakuriani	Cross country skiing	Girls' sprint freestyle

== See also ==
- Estonia at the Youth Olympics
- Estonia at the Olympics
