= Ski jumping at the 2023 European Youth Olympic Winter Festival =

- Venue: Planica Nordic Centre
- Date: 23–27 January
- Website: eyof2023.it

Ski jumping at the 2023 European Youth Olympic Winter Festival was held from 23 to 27 January at Planica Nordic Centre in Planica, Slovenia.

== Medal summary ==
=== Medal table ===
* Host nation (Italy)

Rank	Nation	Gold	Silver	Bronze	Total
1	Slovenia (SLO)	3	0	0	3
2	Austria (AUT)	2	0	0	2
3	Poland (POL)	0	3	1	4
4	Italy (ITA)*	0	1	0	1
4	Switzerland (SUI)	0	1	0	1
6	Germany (GER)	0	0	3	3
7	Czech Republic (CZE)	0	0	1	1
Totals (7 entries)		5	5	5	15

=== Boys' events ===
Event	Gold		Silver		Bronze	
Boys' individual	Stephan Embacher; Austria	268.8	Klemens Joniak; Poland	248.1	Wiktor Szozda; Poland	246.6
Boys' team	Austria; Johannes Pölz; Simon Steinberger; Jakob Steinberger; Stephan Embacher	976.5	Poland; Tymoteusz Amilkiewicz; Klemens Staszel; Wiktor Szozda; Klemens Joniak	890.2	Germany; Lukas Nellenschulte; Lasse Deimel; Alex Reiter; Julian Fussi	874.3

=== Girls' events ===
Event	Gold		Silver		Bronze	
Girls' individual	Nika Prevc; Slovenia	230.6	Sina Arnet; Switzerland	207.3	Anežka Indráčková; Czech Republic	196.5
Girls' team	Slovenia; Tinkara Komar; Katarina Pirnovar; Taja Bodlaj; Nika Prevc	859.5	Italy; Giada Delugan; Greta Pinzani; Martina Zanitzer; Noelia Vuerich	656.5	Germany; Selina Kölle; Nadine Färber; Christina Feicht; Joanna Eberle	644.7

=== Mixed event ===
Event	Gold		Silver		Bronze	
Mixed team	Slovenia; Tinkara Komar; Nik Heberle; Nika Prevc; Luka Filip	918.6	Poland; Natalia Słowik; Wiktor Szozda; Pola Bełtowska; Klemens Joniak	829.5	Germany; Selina Kölle; Lasse Deimel; Joanna Eberle; Alex Reiter	818.7
