= Nordic combined at the 2023 European Youth Olympic Winter Festival =

- Venue: Paruzzi Arena, Italy; Planica Nordic Centre, Slovenia
- Date: 24–26 January
- Website: eyof2023.it

Nordic combined at the 2023 European Youth Olympic Winter Festival was held from 24 to 26 January at Paruzzi Arena in Tarvisio, Italy and Planica Nordic Centre, Planica, Slovenia.

== Medal summary ==
=== Medal table ===
* Host nation (Italy)

Rank	Nation	Gold	Silver	Bronze	Total
1	Austria (AUT)	1	1	1	3
2	Germany (GER)	1	0	2	3
3	Czech Republic (CZE)	1	0	0	1
4	Italy (ITA)*	0	2	0	2
Totals (4 entries)		3	3	3	9

=== Events ===
Event	Gold		Silver		Bronze	
Boys' individual normal hill/6 km	Lukáš Doležal; Czech Republic	14:48.4	Paul Walcher; Austria	14:59.7	Maximilian Slamik; Austria	15:32.6
Girls' individual normal hill/4 km	Trine Göpfert; Germany	12:04.4	Greta Pinzani; Italy	12:49.0	Anne Häckel; Germany	12:57.5
Mixed team normal hill/4 × 3.3 km	Austria; Maximilian Slamik; Laura Pletz; Anja Rathbeg; Paul Walcher	35:44.1	Italy; Bryan Venturini; Greta Pinzani; Giada Delugan; Manuel Senoner	36:10.9	Germany; Constantin Müller; Anne Häckel; Trine Göpfert; Mika Ketterer	36:23.7
