= K115 =

K115 or K-115 may refer to:

- K-115 (Kansas highway), a state highway in Kansas
- Bakuriani K-115, a ski jump hill
- 9K115 Metis, an anti-tank missile
- 9K115-2 Metis-M, an anti-tank missile
- HMCS Lévis (K115), a former Canadian Navy ship

== See also ==
- Ripasudil, previously known as K-115
