= Nataliia Kaziuk =

Ukrainian freestyle skier (born 2006)

Personal information
- Native name: Наталія Дмитрівна Казюк
- Born: 24 October 2006 (age 19) Ivano-Frankivsk, Ukraine

Sport
- Country: Ukraine
- Sport: Freestyle skiing
- Events: Slopestyle; Big air
Medal record
Women's freestyle skiing
Representing Ukraine
European Youth Olympic Festival
Bronze medal – third place	2023 Friuli-Venezia Giulia	Big air

Nataliia Dmytrivna Kaziuk (Ukrainian: Наталія Дмитрівна Казюк; born 24 October 2006) is a Ukrainian freestyle skier who competed in the big air and slopestyle events at the 2024 Winter Youth Olympics, held in Gangwon, South Korea.

== Career ==
In 2023, Kaziuk represented Ukraine at the European Youth Olympic Festival, held in Friuli-Venezia Giulia, where she came third in the big air event. That was the first award for the Ukrainian national team at this Olympic festival.

The following year, Kaziuk competed at the 2024 Winter Youth Olympics, held in Gangwon, South Korea, finishing 9th in the big air event.
