= Mariia Khokhelko =

Short track speed skater from Ukraine

Personal information
- Nationality: Ukrainian
- Born: 1 July 2008 (age 17) Kyiv, Ukraine

Sport
- Country: Ukraine
- Sport: Short track speed skating
- Club: AZS KU Politechniki Opolskiej Opole
Medal record
Women's short-track speed skating
Representing Ukraine
European Youth Olympic Festival
Gold medal – first place	2025 Bakuriani	1000 m
Bronze medal – third place	2025 Bakuriani	500 m
Bronze medal – third place	2025 Bakuriani	1500 m

Mariia Oleksandrivna Khokhelko (Ukrainian: Марія Олександрівна Хохелько; born 1 July 2008) is a short track speed skater from Ukraine. She is member of the Ukrainian team that won a gold medal in the 1000 metres and the bronze medals in the 500 and 1500 metre events at the European Youth Olympic Festival in 2025.
