= 2023 European Youth Olympic Winter Festival =

2023 European Youth Winter Olympic Festival
- Host city: Friuli-Venezia Giulia, Italy
- Country: Italy
- Nations: 47
- Athletes: 1,252
- Sport: 12
- Events: 59
- Opening: 21 January 2023
- Closing: 28 January 2023
- Opened by: Andrea Abodi
- Torch lighter: Jonathan Milan
- Website: www.eyof2023.it

Summer

Winter

The 2023 European Youth Olympic Winter Festival was held in Friuli-Venezia Giulia, Italy, between 21 and 28 January 2023. This was Italy's second time as host of the winter festival after Aosta 1993. As the 2003 Winter Universiade, in addition of Italy, several events were held in Austria and Slovenia.

== Sports ==
The following competitions took place

2023 European Youth Olympic Winter Festival Sports Programme
- Alpine skiing (6)
- Biathlon (5)
- Cross-country skiing (7)
- Curling (1)
- Figure skating (2)
- Freestyle skiing (6)
- Ice hockey (2)
- Nordic combined (3)
- Short track speed skating (7)
- Ski jumping (5)
- Ski mountaineering (5)
- Snowboarding (10)

Freestyle skiing and ski mountaineering made their EYOF debut. Medals were awarded in record 59 events in 12 sports, compared to 39 in 9 sports at the previous edition.

== Venues ==
Venue	Location	Sports
Ski Area Tarvisio	Tarvisio	Alpine skiing
Paruzzi Arena	Tarvisio	Nordic combined
International Biathlon Centre “Carnia Arena”	Forni Avoltri	Biathlon
Ski Area Sappada	Sappada	Cross-country skiing
Ice skating stadium	Claut	Curling
Ice arena Claudio Vuerich	Pontebba	Figure skating, Short track speed skating
Ski Area Ravascletto Zoncolan	Ravascletto	Freestyle skiing
Fiera di Udine	Udine	Ice hockey
Ski area Forni di Sopra	Forni di Sopra	Ski mountaineering
Ski area Piancavallo	Piancavallo	Snowboarding
Eissportarena	Spittal an der Drau, Austria	Ice hockey
Planica Nordic Centre	Planica, Slovenia	Ski jumping, Nordic combined

== Schedule ==
The competition schedule for the 2023 European Youth Olympic Winter Festival is as follows:

OC	Opening ceremony	1	Event finals	CC	Closing ceremony	●	Event competitions

January	21 Sat	22 Sun	23 Mon	24 Tue	25 Wed	26 Thu	27 Fri	28 Sat	Events
Ceremonies	OC							CC	
Alpine skiing				1	1	1	1	2	6
Biathlon				2		2		1	5
Cross-country skiing			2	1	1	2	1		7
Curling			●	●	●	●	1		1
Figure skating					●	1	1		2
Freestyle skiing		●		2	2	●	2		6
Ice hockey		●	●	●	●	●	2		2
Nordic combined				2		1			3
Short track speed skating		2	2	3					7
Ski jumping			2		2		1		5
Ski mountaineering				2	1		2		5
Snowboarding		●	2	3	●	2	3		10
Total events		2	8	16	7	9	14	3	59
Cumulative total		2	10	26	33	42	56	59	59
January	21 Sat	22 Sun	23 Mon	24 Tue	25 Wed	26 Thu	27 Fri	28 Sat	Events

== Participant nations ==
1252 athletes from 47 nations are expected to participate:

Participating National Olympic Committees (47)
- Albania (1)
- Andorra (5)
- Armenia (9)
- Austria (83)
- Azerbaijan (1)
- Belgium (7)
- Bosnia and Herzegovina (10)
- Bulgaria (24)
- Croatia (8)
- Cyprus (3)
- Czech Republic (79)
- Denmark (14)
- Estonia (19)
- Finland (81)
- France (62)
- (Georgia (country)) Georgia (8)
- Germany (106)
- (United Kingdom) Great Britain (17)
- Greece (10)
- Hungary (21)
- Iceland (18)
- (Republic of Ireland) Ireland (2)
- Israel (2)
- Italy (109)
- Kosovo (3)
- Latvia (46)
- Liechtenstein (2)
- Lithuania (18)
- Luxembourg (1)
- Moldova (1)
- Monaco (1)
- Montenegro (3)
- Netherlands (8)
- North Macedonia (6)
- Norway (38)
- Poland (54)
- Portugal (1)
- Romania (18)
- San Marino (1)
- Serbia (3)
- Slovakia (76)
- Slovenia (47)
- Spain (20)
- Sweden (60)
- Switzerland (95)
- Turkey (24)
- Ukraine (27)

*As a result of the Russian invasion of Ukraine, the European Olympic Committees has taken a decision to not invite athletes from Russia and Belarus to the European Youth Olympic Winter Festival.

== Medal table ==
* Host nation (Italy)

Rank	Nation	Gold	Silver	Bronze	Total
1	France	7	6	4	17
2	Italy*	6	8	7	21
3	Switzerland	6	3	3	12
4	Austria	6	2	9	17
5	Hungary	6	1	1	8
6	Slovenia	6	0	0	6
7	Germany	4	5	8	17
8	Czech Republic	4	1	6	11
9	Sweden	3	5	6	14
10	Finland	3	4	2	9
11	Spain	3	0	0	3
12	Poland	1	7	6	14
13	Latvia	1	2	1	4
14	Great Britain	1	1	0	2
15	Ukraine	1	0	2	3
16	Israel	1	0	0	1
17	Norway	0	5	1	6
18	Bulgaria	0	2	1	3
18	Netherlands	0	2	1	3
20	Slovakia	0	2	0	2
21	Estonia	0	1	1	2
22	Georgia	0	1	0	1
22	Serbia	0	1	0	1
Totals (23 entries)		59	59	59	177
