= Alpine skiing at the 2025 European Youth Olympic Winter Festival =

- Venue: Didveli
- Location: Bakuriani, Georgia
- Date: 10–16 February

Alpine skiing at the 2025 European Youth Olympic Winter Festival was held from 10 to 16 February at Didveli, in Bakuriani, Georgia.

== Medal summary ==
=== Medal table ===
* Host nation (Georgia)

Rank	Nation	Gold	Silver	Bronze	Total
1	Norway (NOR)	2	1	1	4
2	Great Britain (GBR)	1	0	1	2
3	France (FRA)	1	0	0	1
3	Switzerland (SUI)	1	0	0	1
5	Italy (ITA)	0	3	1	4
6	Spain (ESP)	0	1	0	1
7	Croatia (CRO)	0	0	1	1
7	Czech Republic (CZE)	0	0	1	1
Totals (8 entries)		5	5	5	15

=== Boys' events ===
Event	Gold		Silver		Bronze	
Slalom	Storm Andre Hagen; Norway	1:31.79	Luken Garitano Iturbe; Spain	1:32.80	Zak Carrick-Smith; Great Britain	1:32.92
Giant slalom	Freddy Carrick-Smith; Great Britain	1:37.71	Storm Andre Hagen; Norway	1:38.38	Ziggy Vrdoljak; Croatia	1:38.94

=== Girls' events ===
Event	Gold		Silver		Bronze	
Slalom	Ilona Charbotel; France	1:37.86	Marta Giaretta; Italy	1:39.85	Victoria Klotz; Italy	1:40.30
Giant slalom	Lara Bianchi; Switzerland	1:39.55	Marta Giaretta; Italy	1:40.82	Helene Unhjem Oveland; Norway	1:41.21

=== Mixed events ===
Event	Gold	Silver	Bronze
Team parallel	Norway; Helene Unhjem Oveland; Storm Andre Hagen; Victoria Nordmo Mikalsen; Elias Hartford Kvael	Italy; Marta Giaretta; Luca Loranzi; Victoria Klotz; Alex Silbernagl	Czech Republic; Lara Huml; David Janda; Tereza Koutná; Ludvík Vaček

== Participating nations ==
- Albania (1)
- Armenia (2)
- Austria (8)
- Belgium (1)
- Bulgaria (3)
- Croatia (2)
- Cyprus (2)
- Czech Republic (8)
- Denmark (6)
- Estonia (3)
- Finland (8)
- France (6)
- Georgia (9)
- (United Kingdom) Great Britain (7)
- Greece (6)
- Hungary (4)
- Iceland (8)
- Ireland (3)
- Israel (1)
- Italy (8)
- Kosovo (2)
- Latvia (4)
- Liechtenstein (3)
- Lithuania (3)
- Monaco (1)
- Montenegro (1)
- Netherlands (2)
- Norway (8)
- Poland (6)
- Portugal (2)
- Romania (4)
- San Marino (3)
- Serbia (1)
- Slovakia (6)
- Slovenia (8)
- Spain (4)
- Switzerland (8)
- Turkey (4)
- Ukraine (4)
