= Janez Gorišek =

Slovenian civil engineer (1933–2023)

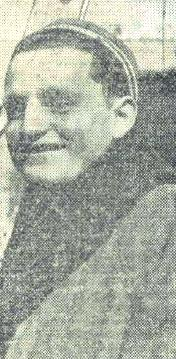
- Gorišek in 1954
- Born: September 13, 1933; Ljubljana, Kingdom of Yugoslavia
- Died: March 21, 2023 (aged 89)
- Education: Faculty of Civil Engineering and Geodesy, University of Ljubljana
- Occupation: Architect
- Buildings: Letalnica Bratov Gorišek (Planica, Slovenia)

Janez Gorišek
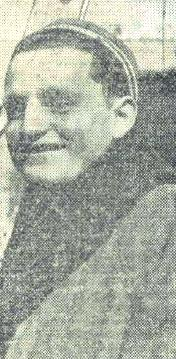

Sport
- Sport: Skiing

Achievements and titles
- Personal best: 105 m (344 ft)

Janez Gorišek (September 13, 1933 – March 21, 2023) was a Slovenian civil engineer, constructor, and architect. He held a degree from the Faculty of Civil Engineering and Geodesy at the University of Ljubljana. His works were mainly constructions of ski jumping and ski flying hills worldwide; his best-known work being the Gorišek Brothers Ski Flying Hill (Letalnica bratov Gorišek) in Planica, Slovenia, which he developed with his brother Lado (1925–1997) and which was the world's second-largest ski flying hill. He drew the profile for the renovated Planica flying hill with the help of his son. Since 2015, the hill is again the largest in the world. He also participated in the ski jumping event at the 1956 Winter Olympics.

Gorišek died on March 21, 2023, at the age of 89.

== Completed works ==
- Kulm – Bad Mitterndorf, Austria (enlarged/renovated)
- 1967–1969: Letalnica Bratov Gorišek – Planica, Slovenia
- 1973: Heini-Klopfer-Shanze – Oberstdorf, Germany (enlarged/renovated)
- 1982–1984: Igman Olympic Ski Jumping Center – Igman, Bosnia and Herzegovina
- 1987–1989: Große Olympiaschanze – Garmisch-Partenkirchen, Germany (enlarged/renovated)
- 2009–2010: Kiremitliktepe Ski Jump – Erzurum, Turkey
- 2010–2011: Vikersundbakken – Vikersund, Norway (enlarged/renovated)
- 2013: Letalnica Bratov Gorišek, Nordijski center Planica - Slovenia
- 2014: Kulm – Bad Mitterndorf, Austria (profile/renovated)
