= Alpine skiing at the 2023 European Youth Olympic Winter Festival =

- Venue: Ski Area Tarvisio
- Date: 24–28 January
- Website: eyof2023.it

Alpine skiing at the 2023 European Youth Olympic Winter Festival was held from 24 to 28 January at Ski Area Tarvisio in Tarvisio, Italy.

== Medal summary ==
=== Medal table ===
* Host nation (Italy)

Rank	Nation	Gold	Silver	Bronze	Total
1	Austria (AUT)	1	1	4	6
2	Italy (ITA)*	1	0	1	2
3	France (FRA)	1	0	0	1
3	Hungary (HUN)	1	0	0	1
3	Slovenia (SLO)	1	0	0	1
3	Switzerland (SUI)	1	0	0	1
7	Sweden (SWE)	0	2	1	3
8	Norway (NOR)	0	2	0	2
9	Germany (GER)	0	1	0	1
Totals (9 entries)		6	6	6	18

=== Boys' events ===
Event	Gold		Silver		Bronze	
Slalom	Emile Baur; France	1:32.08	Gustav Wissting; Sweden	1:32.22	Moritz Zudrell; Austria	1:32.57
Giant slalom	Miha Oserban; Slovenia	2:40.05	Rasmus Bakkevig; Norway	2:40.54	Moritz Zudrell; Austria	2:41.03
Super-G	Attila Bányai; Hungary	1:03.75	Rasmus Bakkevig; Norway	1:03.79	Moritz Zudrell; Austria	1:03.84

=== Girls' events ===
Event	Gold		Silver		Bronze	
Slalom	Leonie Raich; Austria	1:32.83	Laila Illig; Germany	1:33.72	Moa Landström; Sweden	1:33.74
Giant slalom	Ludovica Righi; Italy	2:46.48	Moa Landström; Sweden	2:46.75	Nadine Hundegger; Austria	2:46.84
Super-G	Laura Huber; Switzerland	1:05.32	Nadine Hundegger; Austria	1:05.95	Tatum Bieler; Italy	1:05.99
