= Ski mountaineering at the 2023 European Youth Olympic Winter Festival =

- Venue: Ski area Forni di Sopra
- Date: 24–27 January
- Website: eyof2023.it

Ski mountaineering at the 2023 European Youth Olympic Winter Festival was held from 24 to 27 January at Ski area Forni di Sopra in Forni di Sopra, Italy. This was the first time that Ski mountaineering was part of European Youth Olympic Winter Festival due to the sport making its debut at the 2026 Winter Olympics.

== Medal summary ==
=== Medal table ===
* Host nation (Italy)

Rank	Nation	Gold	Silver	Bronze	Total
1	Spain (ESP)	3	0	0	3
2	Italy (ITA)*	2	1	3	6
3	Norway (NOR)	0	2	0	2
4	Germany (GER)	0	1	0	1
4	Switzerland (SUI)	0	1	0	1
6	Austria (AUT)	0	0	1	1
6	Czech Republic (CZE)	0	0	1	1
Totals (7 entries)		5	5	5	15

=== Boys' events ===
Event	Gold		Silver		Bronze	
Individual	Eric Canovi; Italy	52:44.9	Marcello Scarinzi; Italy	54:47.3	Silvano Wolf; Austria	54:58.7
Sprint	Eric Canovi; Italy	2:30.56	David Jost; Germany	2:40.44	Martino Utzeri; Italy	2:52.19

=== Girls' events ===
Event	Gold		Silver		Bronze	
Individual	Laila Sellés; Spain	59:43.7	Malin Indergård; Norway	1:00:32.5	Melissa Bertolina; Italy	1:00:52.8
Sprint	Laila Sellés; Spain	3:15.33	Malin Indergård; Norway	3:19.39	Eva Matějovičová; Czech Republic	3:23.76

=== Mixed events ===
Event	Gold		Silver		Bronze	
Sprint	Spain; Laila Sellés; Miguel Fenoll	42:47.50	Switzerland; Lynn Pollinger; Mathieu Pharisa	43:12.07	Italy; Melissa Bertolina; Eric Canovi	43:14.65
