= Freestyle skiing at the 2025 European Youth Olympic Winter Festival =

- Venue: Didveli
- Location: Bakuriani, Georgia
- Date: 10–15 February

Freestyle skiing at the 2025 European Youth Olympic Winter Festival was held from 10 to 15 February at Didveli, in Bakuriani, Georgia.

== Medal summary ==
=== Medal table ===
* Host nation (Georgia)

Rank	Nation	Gold	Silver	Bronze	Total
1	Austria (AUT)	1	1	0	2
1	Estonia (EST)	1	1	0	2
3	Great Britain (GBR)	1	0	1	2
3	Switzerland (SUI)	1	0	1	2
5	Sweden (SWE)	0	1	2	3
6	Denmark (DEN)	0	1	0	1
Totals (6 entries)		4	4	4	12

=== Boys' events ===
Event	Gold		Silver		Bronze	
Big air	Benjamin Lengger; Austria	183.00	Victor Knutsen; Sweden	180.00	Viktor Alexander Maksyagin; Switzerland	179.50
Slopestyle	Viktor Alexander Maksyagin; Switzerland	90.00	Benjamin Lengger; Austria	88.50	Victor Knutsen; Sweden	87.50

=== Girls' events ===
Event	Gold		Silver		Bronze	
Big air	Sandra Caune; Great Britain	170.50	Simona Revjagin; Estonia	145.75	Estrid Fahlen; Sweden	131.50
Slopestyle	Simona Revjagin; Estonia	86.00	Silje Kinkead; Denmark	82.50	Sandra Caune; Great Britain	80.00

== Participating nations ==
- Austria (2)
- Czech Republic (2)
- Denmark (2)
- Estonia (2)
- Finland (2)
- France (4)
- (United Kingdom) Great Britain (2)
- Italy (2)
- Latvia (1)
- Lithuania (1)
- Poland (2)
- Slovenia (1)
- Sweden (4)
- Switzerland (2)
- Ukraine (2)
