= Francesca Barale =

Italian cyclist (born 2003)

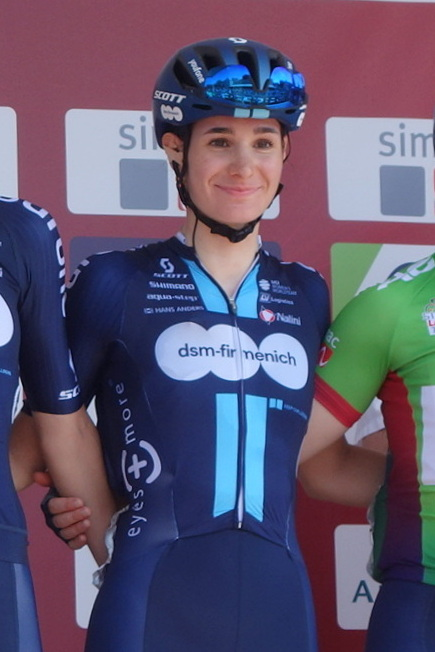
- Barale in 2023

Personal information
- Born: 29 April 2003 (age 23) Domodossola, Italy

Cycling career
- Sport: Cycling
- Current team: Team Picnic–PostNL
- Discipline: Road
- Role: Rider

Amateur team
- 2021: A.S.D. VO2 Team Pink

Professional team
- 2022–: Team DSM

Francesca Barale (born 29 April 2003) is an Italian professional racing cyclist, who currently rides for UCI Women's WorldTeam Team Picnic–PostNL.

== Major results ==
2019
2nd Road race, European Youth Summer Olympic Festival
2020
National Junior Road Championships

1st Time trial
3rd Road race

2021
1st Time trial, National Junior Road Championships
2nd Overall Tour du Gévaudan Occitanie

1st Mountains classification

4th Road race, European Junior Road Championships
4th Piccolo Trofeo Alfredo Binda
2022
8th Time trial, European Under-23 Road Championships
2023
4th Tre Valli Varesine
2024
3rd Geelong Classic
6th Deakin University Elite Women’s Road Race
