= Schwinghammer =

Schwinghammer is a surname. Notable people with the surname include:

- Maïa Schwinghammer (born 2001), Canadian freestyle skier
- Sepp Schwinghammer (born 1950), German ski jumper
