= Cross-country skiing at the 2025 European Youth Olympic Winter Festival =

- Venue: Bakuriani Biathlon-Cross Country Stadium
- Location: Bakuriani, Georgia
- Date: 11–16 February

Cross-country skiing at the 2025 European Youth Olympic Winter Festival was held from 11 to 16 February at Bakuriani Biathlon-Cross Country Stadium, in Bakuriani, Georgia.

== Medal summary ==
=== Medal table ===
* Host nation (Georgia)

Rank	Nation	Gold	Silver	Bronze	Total
1	Italy (ITA)	4	1	0	5
2	France (FRA)	1	2	3	6
3	Sweden (SWE)	1	1	0	2
4	Switzerland (SUI)	1	0	2	3
5	Finland (FIN)	0	2	1	3
6	Czech Republic (CZE)	0	1	0	1
7	Estonia (EST)	0	0	1	1
Totals (7 entries)		7	7	7	21

=== Boys' events ===
Event	Gold		Silver		Bronze	
7.5 km classical	Daniel Pedranzini; Italy	19:45.0	Topias Vuorela; Finland	20:01.9	Victor Lafrasse; France	20:17.1
10 km freestyle	Daniel Pedranzini; Italy	23:46.2	Topias Vuorela; Finland	24:13.6	Gaspard Cottaz; France	24:27.9
Sprint freestyle	Daniel Pedranzini; Italy	2:12.23	Luca Pietroboni; Italy	2:12.33	Kalle Tossavainen; Finland	2:13.26

=== Girls' events ===
Event	Gold		Silver		Bronze	
5 km classical	Malva Nisén; Sweden	14:48.7	Gaëtane Breniaux; France	15:20.7	Nina Cantieni; Switzerland	15:22.2
7.5 km freestyle	Gaëtane Breniaux; France	20:48.8	Malva Nisén; Sweden	21:01.2	Anouchka Neuville; France	21:13.8
Sprint freestyle	Nina Cantieni; Switzerland	2:27.48	Eliška Polonská; Czech Republic	2:28.33	Gerda Kivil; Estonia	2:28.46

=== Mixed events ===
Event	Gold		Silver		Bronze	
4 x 5 km mixed relay	Italy Alice Leoni; Luca Pietroboni; Vanessa Cagnati; Daniel Pedranzini	55:31.6	France Gaetane Breniaux; Victor Lafrasse; Anouchka Neuville; Gaspard Cottaz	55:36.1	Switzerland Nina Cantieni; Victor Gailland; Lina Bundi; Jon Arvid Flury	55:37.9

== Participating nations ==
- Armenia (2)
- Austria (8)
- Bulgaria (2)
- Croatia (3)
- Czech Republic (8)
- Denmark (1)
- Estonia (6)
- Finland (8)
- France (8)
- (United Kingdom) Great Britain (4)
- Greece (1)
- Hungary (2)
- Iceland (6)
- Italy (8)
- Latvia (5)
- Lithuania (4)
- Moldova (1)
- Poland (8)
- Romania (4)
- Serbia (1)
- Slovakia (5)
- Slovenia (8)
- Spain (2)
- Sweden (6)
- Switzerland (8)
- Turkey (4)
- Ukraine (8)
