= Snowboarding at the 2025 European Youth Olympic Winter Festival =

- Venue: Didveli
- Location: Bakuriani, Georgia
- Date: 11–15 February

Snowboarding at the 2025 European Youth Olympic Winter Festival was held from 11 to 15 February at Didveli, in Bakuriani, Georgia.

== Medal summary ==
=== Medal table ===
* Host nation (Georgia)

Rank	Nation	Gold	Silver	Bronze	Total
1	Spain (ESP)	2	0	0	2
2	France (FRA)	1	2	1	4
3	Great Britain (GBR)	1	0	0	1
4	Germany (GER)	0	1	3	4
5	Estonia (EST)	0	1	0	1
Totals (5 entries)		4	4	4	12

=== Boys' events ===
Event	Gold		Silver		Bronze	
Big air	Unai Lopez Sousa; Spain	171.25	Ugo Pirolli; France	165.25	Damian Millinger; Germany	161.75
Slopestyle	Unai Lopez Sousa; Spain	92.25	Luka Kamissek; Germany	90.25	Lenny Collomb Paton; France	87.50

=== Girls' events ===
Event	Gold		Silver		Bronze	
Big air	Emily Rothney; Great Britain	156.75	Aono Pordie Okaniwa; France	149.50	Janina Walz; Germany	140.50
Slopestyle	Aono Pordie Okaniwa; France	80.75	Laura Anga; Estonia	78.00	Janina Walz; Germany	58.75

== Participating nations ==
- Austria (3)
- Belgium (2)
- Croatia (2)
- Czech Republic (3)
- Estonia (3)
- Finland (3)
- France (3)
- Germany (4)
- (United Kingdom) Great Britain (2)
- Greece (3)
- Hungary (2)
- Iceland (1)
- Italy (4)
- Latvia (1)
- Lithuania (1)
- Netherlands (3)
- North Macedonia (2)
- Norway (4)
- Poland (2)
- Romania (4)
- Spain (1)
- Sweden (2)
- Switzerland (4)
