= Short-track speed skating at the 2025 European Youth Olympic Winter Festival =

- Venue: Batumi Ice Arena
- Location: Batumi, Georgia
- Date: 10–15 February

Short-track speed skating at the 2025 European Youth Olympic Winter Festival was held from 10 to 15 February at Batumi Ice Arena in Batumi, Georgia.

== Medal summary ==
=== Medal table ===
* Host nation (Georgia)

Rank	Nation	Gold	Silver	Bronze	Total
1	France (FRA)	2	2	1	5
2	Italy (ITA)	2	2	0	4
3	Hungary (HUN)	1	1	2	4
4	Ukraine (UKR)	1	0	2	3
5	Netherlands (NED)	1	0	0	1
6	Poland (POL)	0	2	0	2
7	Turkey (TUR)	0	0	2	2
Totals (7 entries)		7	7	7	21

=== Boys' events ===
Event	Gold		Silver		Bronze	
500 m	Filippo Pezzoni; Italy	43.420	Franciszek Izbicki; Poland	43:443	Mihály Árendás; Hungary	43.555
1000 m	Filippo Pezzoni; Italy	1:32.607	Alessandro Picco; Italy	1:32.795	Berat Efe Dal; Turkey	1:33.302
1500 m	Jesper Schmitz; Netherlands	2:27.560	Filippo Pezzoni; Italy	2:27.753	Elio Calanca; France	2:27.827

=== Girls' events ===
Event	Gold		Silver		Bronze	
500 m	Isra Gharsallaoui; France	45.994	Natasa Molnár; Hungary	46.102	Mariia Khokhelko; Ukraine	46.277
1000 m	Mariia Khokhelko; Ukraine	1:35.703	Lisa-Victoria Ngo Mouaha; France	1:35.781	Natasa Molnár; Hungary	1:35.834
1500 m	Lisa-Victoria Ngo Mouaha; France	2:42.123	Daria Daszuta; Poland	2:42.562	Mariia Khokhelko; Ukraine	2:42.718

=== Mixed events ===
Event	Gold		Silver		Bronze	
2000 m mixed relay	Hungary; Flora Kiss Gebora; Natasa Molnár; Mihaly Arendas; Bence Benedek Kun	2:50.253	France; Lisa-Victoria Ngo Mouaha; Isra Gharsallaoui; Elio Calanca; Nathan Muller	2:50.326	Turkey; Nisa Nur Fidan; Derya Karadag; Berat Efe Dal; Yusuf Mirac Uludag	2:55.823

== Participating nations ==
- Belgium (2)
- Bulgaria (1)
- Croatia (2)
- Czech Republic (4)
- Denmark (1)
- Finland (1)
- France (4)
- (United Kingdom) Great Britain (2)
- Hungary (4)
- Italy (4)
- Latvia (2)
- Lithuania (1)
- Netherlands (4)
- Norway (4)
- Poland (4)
- Serbia (1)
- Slovakia (2)
- Slovenia (3)
- Switzerland (1)
- Turkey (4)
- Ukraine (4)
