= Cross-country skiing at the 2023 European Youth Olympic Winter Festival =

- Venue: Ski Area Sappada
- Date: 23–27 January
- Website: eyof2023.it

Cross-country skiing at the 2023 European Youth Olympic Winter Festival was held from 23 to 27 January at Ski Area Sappada in Sappada, Italy.

== Medal summary ==
=== Medal table ===
* Host nation (Italy)

Rank	Nation	Gold	Silver	Bronze	Total
1	Sweden (SWE)	3	2	4	9
2	Italy (ITA)*	2	2	0	4
3	Austria (AUT)	1	0	0	1
3	France (FRA)	1	0	0	1
5	Finland (FIN)	0	3	0	3
6	Czech Republic (CZE)	0	0	1	1
6	Germany (GER)	0	0	1	1
6	Switzerland (SUI)	0	0	1	1
Totals (8 entries)		7	7	7	21

=== Boys' events ===
Event	Gold		Silver		Bronze	
10 km Individual Classic	Gabriele Matli; Italy	27:05.7	Simon Nordlander; Sweden	27:52.7	Hugo Nilsson; Sweden	27:52.8
7.5 km Individual Free	Gabriele Matli; Italy	18:08.5	Federico Pozzi; Italy	18:15.9	Hugo Nilsson; Sweden	18:32.5
Sprint	Jonatan Lindberg; Sweden	2:23.61	Federico Pozzi; Italy	2:24.77	Simon Nordlander; Sweden	2:25.23

=== Girls' events ===
Event	Gold		Silver		Bronze	
7.5 km Individual Classic	Mira Göransson; Sweden	23:00.2	Silva Kemppi; Finland	23:35.0	Lena Einsiedler; Germany	23:41.1
5 km Individual Free	Margot Tirloy; France	13:10.1	Silva Kemppi; Finland	13:42.2	Estelle Darbellay; Switzerland	13:44.5
Sprint	Heidi Bucher; Austria	2:45.87	Minna Mikaelsson; Sweden	2:46.04	Maja Axelsson; Sweden	2:46.08

=== Mixed event ===
Event	Gold		Silver		Bronze	
Mixed 4 x 5 km relay	Sweden; Simon Nordlander; Mira Göransson; Hugo Nilsson; Moa Lindgren	51:45.0	Finland; Jesse Kähärä; Selene Rossi; Akseli Pitkänen; Silva Kemppi	51:48.5	Czech Republic; Jonáš Jan Hellmich; Hanka Randáková; Matěj Kožnar; Anna Milerská	52:03.8
