= Curling at the 2023 European Youth Olympic Winter Festival =

- Venue: Ice skating stadium
- Date: 23–27 January
- Website: eyof2023.it

Curling at the 2023 European Youth Olympic Winter Festival was held from 23 to 27 January at Ice skating stadium in Claut, Italy. The sport returned to the EYOF program after being absent from the 2022 edition.

== Medal summary ==
=== Medal table ===
* Host nation (Italy)

Rank	Nation	Gold	Silver	Bronze	Total
1	Switzerland (SUI)	1	0	0	1
2	Germany (GER)	0	1	0	1
3	Latvia (LAT)	0	0	1	1
Totals (3 entries)		1	1	1	3

=== Medalists ===
Event	Gold	Silver	Bronze
Mixed teams	Switzerland; Felix Lüthold; Zoe Schwaller; Jonas Feierabend; Anja von Arx	Germany; Lukas Jäger; Joy Sutor; Leonhard Angrick; Pauline Walther	Latvia; Kristaps Zass; Agate Regža; Toms Sondors; Marija Seļiverstova
