= Mariia Aniichyn =

Ukrainian freestyle skier (born 2007)

Personal information
- Native name: Марія Романівна Анійчин
- Born: 28 August 2007 (age 18) Ivano-Frankivsk, Ukraine

Sport
- Country: Ukraine
- Sport: Freestyle skiing
- Events: Slopestyle; Big air
Medal record
Women's freestyle skiing
Representing Ukraine
Winter Universiade
| Silver medal – second place | 2025 Turin | Big air |
World Junior Championships
| Bronze medal – third place | 2024 Livigno | Big air |

Mariia Romanivna Aniichyn (Ukrainian: Марія Романівна Анійчин; born 28 August 2007) is a Ukrainian freestyle skier who competed in the big air and slopestyle events at the 2024 Winter Youth Olympics, held in Gangwon, South Korea.

== Career ==
Her first achievement in her international competitions is two gold medals in the big air and slopestyle events at the 2023 Lithuanian National Championships, held in Druskininkai.

Then she represented Ukraine at the 2024 Winter Youth Olympics, held in Gangwon, South Korea, finishing 8th in the big air event.

At the 2024 World Junior Championships, held in Livigno, Aniichyn won a bronze medal in the big air event firstly in the history of Ukrainian national team.

Mariia also came first at the 2023-24 FIS Freestyle Skiing European Cup, held in Kotelnica Bialczanska, in the big air event.

On 19 January 2025, Mariia won a silver medal in big air at the Winter Universiade in Turin.
