= Freestyle skiing at the 2024 Winter Youth Olympics – Women's big air =

Women's big air at the IV Winter Youth Olympic Games
- Venue: Welli Hilli Park
- Dates: 27–28 January
- Competitors: 18 from 11 nations
- Winning points: 180.00

Medalists
1st place, gold medalist(s)		Flora Tabanelli	Italy
2nd place, silver medalist(s)		Daisy Thomas	Australia
3rd place, bronze medalist(s)		Muriel Mohr	Germany

The women's big air event in freestyle skiing at the 2024 Winter Youth Olympics took place on 27 and 28 January at the Welli Hilli Park.

== Qualification ==
The qualification was started on 27 January at 10:15.

Rank	Bib	Name	Country	Run 1	Run 2	Best	Notes
1	1	Flora Tabanelli	Italy	89.50	7.50	89.50	Q
2	3	Daisy Thomas	Australia	53.50	84.25	84.25	Q
3	9	Xiao Siyu	China	77.00	44.75	77.00	Q
4	2	Muriel Mohr	Germany	40.25	74.75	74.75	Q
5	6	Han Linshan	China	73.50	41.50	73.50	Q
6	8	Kathryn Gray	United States	68.75	65.75	68.75	Q
7	12	Eleanor Andrews	United States	59.00	67.75	67.75	Q
8	7	Kiho Sugawara	Japan	63.50	67.00	67.00	Q
9	11	Mariia Aniichyn	Ukraine	66.00	49.00	66.00	Q
10	13	Nataliia Kaziuk	Ukraine	64.50	7.75	64.50	Q
11	18	Gabrielle Dinn	Canada	64.00	15.75	64.00	
12	15	Mirjam Revjagin	Estonia	55.25	60.00	60.00	
13	14	Ella Garrod	Canada	12.75	58.50	58.50	
14	17	Grete-Mia Meentalo	Estonia	10.00	11.75	11.75	
15	16	Lucinda Laird	Australia	4.50	6.50	6.50	
	10	Honey Smith	France	Did not start			
	5	Madeleine Disbrowe	New Zealand	Did not start			
	4	Mischa Thomas	New Zealand	Did not start			

== Final ==
The final was started on 28 January at 10:15.

Rank	Start order	Bib	Name	Country	Run 1	Run 2	Run 3	Total
1st place, gold medalist(s)	10	1	Flora Tabanelli	Italy	87.50	92.50	42.00	180.00
2nd place, silver medalist(s)	9	3	Daisy Thomas	Australia	91.00	81.75	31.75	172.75
3rd place, bronze medalist(s)	7	2	Muriel Mohr	Germany	81.00	85.00	64.50	166.25
4	8	9	Xiao Siyu	China	82.00	77.75	23.50	159.75
5	4	12	Eleanor Andrews	United States	79.00	55.25	33.75	134.25
6	6	6	Han Linshan	China	62.00	62.75	70.50	133.25
7	2	8	Kathryn Gray	United States	61.00	64.50	68.50	133.00
8	2	11	Mariia Aniichyn	Ukraine	75.00	37.00	39.75	114.75
9	1	13	Nataliia Kaziuk	Ukraine	58.00	61.25	28.50	89.75
10	3	7	Kiho Sugawara	Japan	45.00	44.75	42.00	87.00
