= Snowboarding at the 2023 European Youth Olympic Winter Festival =

- Venue: Ski area Piancavallo
- Date: 22–27 January
- Website: eyof2023.it

Snowboarding at the 2023 European Youth Olympic Winter Festival was held from 23 to 27 January at Ski area Piancavallo in Piancavallo, Italy.

== Medal table ==
* Host nation (Italy)

Rank	Nation	Gold	Silver	Bronze	Total
1	France (FRA)	4	2	1	7
2	Czech Republic (CZE)	2	1	1	4
3	Great Britain (GBR)	1	1	0	2
3	Italy (ITA)*	1	1	0	2
5	Austria (AUT)	1	0	3	4
6	Germany (GER)	1	0	2	3
7	Bulgaria (BUL)	0	2	1	3
8	Netherlands (NED)	0	2	0	2
9	Switzerland (SUI)	0	1	1	2
10	Norway (NOR)	0	0	1	1
Totals (10 entries)		10	10	10	30

== Boys' events ==
Event	Gold		Silver		Bronze	
Big air	Romain Allemand; France	181.00	Charlie Lane; Great Britain	151.25	Niklas Sukke; Norway	146.00
Slopestyle	Charlie Lane; Great Britain	89.00	Marcello Grassis; Italy	84.75	Luca Mérimée Mantovani; France	82.75
Parallel giant slalom	Mike Santuari; Italy		Petar Gergyovski; Bulgaria		Werner Pietsch; Austria	
Snowboard cross	Achille Leleu; France		Daan Stam; Netherlands		Felix Schwenkel; Germany	

== Girls' events ==
Event	Gold		Silver		Bronze	
Big air	Kristina Holzfeind; Austria	156.25	Sam van Lieshout; Netherlands	143.50	Selin Lakatha; Austria	139.50
Slopestyle	Vanessa Volopichová; Czech Republic	91.75	Yuna Scheidegger; Switzerland	83.75	Soha Janett; Switzerland	80.50
Parallel giant slalom	Mathilda Scheid; Germany		Adéla Keclíková; Czech Republic		Marie Gams; Austria	
Snowboard cross	Félicie Leicht; France		Léa Casta; France		Karolína Šperlová; Czech Republic	

== Mixed events ==
Event	Gold	Silver	Bronze
Parallel giant slalom	Czech Republic; Kryštof Minárik; Adéla Keclíková	Bulgaria; Tervel Zamfirov; Andrea Kotsinova	Germany; Benedikt Riel; Mathilda Scheid
Snowboard cross	France; Eliot Leicht; Léa Casta	France; Achille Leleu; Félicie Leicht	Bulgaria; Ivan Ivanov; Andrea Kotsinova
