= Short-track speed skating at the 2023 European Youth Olympic Winter Festival =

Short track speed skating at the 2023 European Youth Olympic Winter Festival
- Venue: Ice arena Claudio Vuerich
- Date: 22–24 January
- Website: eyof2023.it

Short track speed skating at the 2023 European Youth Olympic Winter Festival was held from 22 to 24 January at Ice arena Claudio Vuerich in Pontebba, Italy.

== Medal summary ==
=== Medal table ===
* Host nation (Italy)

Rank	Nation	Gold	Silver	Bronze	Total
1	Hungary (HUN)	5	1	1	7
2	Poland (POL)	1	3	4	8
3	Latvia (LAT)	1	1	0	2
4	Norway (NOR)	0	1	0	1
4	Serbia (SRB)	0	1	0	1
6	France (FRA)	0	0	1	1
6	Netherlands (NED)	0	0	1	1
Totals (7 entries)		7	7	7	21

=== Boys' events ===
Event	Gold		Silver		Bronze	
500 m	Linards Reinis Laizāns; Latvia	43.734	Luka Jasić; Serbia	43.805	Dominik Palenceusz; Poland	43.909
1000 m	Dominik Major; Hungary	1:30.849	Linards Reinis Laizāns; Latvia	1:31.148	Franck Tekam; France	1:31.266
1500 m	Dominik Major; Hungary	2:22.573	Miika Johan Klevstuen; Norway	2:24.250	Dominik Palenceusz; Poland	2:29.518

=== Girls' events ===
Event	Gold		Silver		Bronze	
500 m	Luca Haltrich; Hungary	45.417	Dóra Szigeti; Hungary	45.518	Hanna Mazur; Poland	46.299
1000 m	Dóra Szigeti; Hungary	1:39.725	Hanna Mazur; Poland	1:39.954	Kornelia Woźniak; Poland	1:40.051
1500 m	Hanna Mazur; Poland	2:36.380	Kornelia Woźniak; Poland	2:36.504	Dóra Szigeti; Hungary	2:36.974

=== Mixed event ===
Event	Gold		Silver		Bronze	
Mixed 2000 m relay	Hungary; Luca Haltrich; Dóra Szigeti; Zalán Jancsó; Dominik Major	2:52.703	Poland; Kornelia Woźniak; Hanna Mazur; Krzysztof Mądry; Dominik Palenceusz	2:55.326	Netherlands; Sophie Nijboer; Pom Straathof; Jonas de Jong; Nick Endeveld	2:59.933
