= Athletics at the 2005 European Youth Summer Olympic Festival =

The athletics competition at the 2005 European Youth Summer Olympic Festival was held from 3 to 8 July. The events took place at the Stadio Comunale G. Teghil in Lignano Sabbiadoro, Italy. Boys and girls born 1988 or 1989 or later participated 33 track and field events, with similar programmes for the sexes with the exception of no steeplechase event for girls. A girls' and a boys' triple jump were contested for the first time.

The competition preceded the 2005 World Youth Championships in Athletics, held later that month. While no athlete at this competition went on to win at the event, several of them reached the podium: Kaire Leibak was the world youth triple jump runner-up, Danijela Grgić was second in the 400 m, António Vital e Silva won another discus throw bronze medal, while Matteo Galvan was third in the 200 m.

Kaire Leibak (the winner of both horizontal jumps) and Melissa Boekelman (shot put and discus throw winner) were the most successful athletes of the competition. Poļina Jeļizarova and Azra Eminović produced close battles in the 1500 m and 3000 m, with Jeļizarova winning the former and Eminović winning the latter event. Clélia Reuse showed versatility by taking the long jump silver before winning the 100 metres hurdles title. No male athlete won more than one individual medal, although 400 m hurdles winner Marius Kranendonk again topped the podium with the Dutch 4×100 metres relay team.

A number of B-finals were held for non-qualifying semi-finalists of some track events – most of these resulted in weaker performances than the final proper, but in the case of the boy's 800 metres the B-final was several seconds faster (indeed, the B-final seventh placer was faster than gold medallist Sören Ludolph). Girls' 800 m B-final winner Lisa Seeger was unfortunate in running a time fast enough for the bronze in the final, but having missed out by placing second in her slow qualifying heat.

Matthias De Zordo and Bohdan Bondarenko—both runner-up here—went on to be world champions in their discipline, with De Zordo winning javelin gold at the 2011 World Championships in Athletics and Bondarenko becoming high jump world champion in 2013. Triple jump winner Lyukman Adams was later a world indoor champion and girls' 100 m champion Yelyzaveta Bryzhina won Olympic and European medals.

== Medal summary ==
=== Men ===
| Event | Gold | | Silver | | Bronze | |
|---|---|---|---|---|---|---|
| 100 metres (wind: +3.8 m/s) | Luis Wee (ESP) | 10.68 w | Giovanni Codrington (NED) | 10.71 w | Julien Klisz (FRA) | 10.78 w |
| 200 metres | Matteo Galvan (ITA) | 21.86 | Reto Schenkel (SUI) | 21.88 | David Hernández (ESP) | 21.93 |
| 400 metres | Arnaud Ghislain (BEL) | 47.92 | Gábor Armuth (HUN) | 48.18 | Pavel Setin (AZE) | 48.24 |
| 800 metres | Sören Ludolph (GER) | 1:57.99 | David McCarthy (IRL) | 1:58.26 | Jonas Modin Rismyhr (NOR) | 1:58.35 |
| 1500 metres | James Shane (GBR) | 3:52.68 | Otmane Belharbazi (FRA) | 3:53.30 | Ciarán Ó Lionáird (IRL) | 3:53.83 |
| 3000 metres | Dmitriy Lashin (UKR) | 8:24.89 | Pavel Abdullin (RUS) | 8:25.27 | Rafael Quintana (ESP) | 8:25.90 |
| 110 metres hurdles | Ivan Byzin (RUS) | 13.92 | João Almeida (POR) | 13.94 | Thomas Martinot-Lagarde (FRA) | 13.96 |
| 400 metres hurdles | Marius Kranendonk (NED) | 52.41 | António Rodrigues (POR) | 52.49 | Santiago Albero (ESP) | 53.93 |
| 2000 metres steeplechase | Adem Belir (TUR) | 5:58.25 | Péter Schubert (HUN) | 5:58.38 | Eoin Healy (IRL) | 6:02.03 |
| 4×100 m relay | Netherlands (NED); Giovanni Codrington; Michael Anpong; Marius Kranendonk; Jorén Tromp | 41.77 | Spain (ESP); Santiago Albero; Antonio Lorenzo; David Hernández; Luis Wee | 41.81 | France (FRA); Thomas Martinot-Lagarde; Nyls Nubret; Damien Mech; Julien Klisz | 41.89 |
| High jump | Riccardo Cecolin (ITA) | 2.14 m | Bohdan Bondarenko (UKR) | 2.12 m | Darius Raminas (LTU) | 2.12 m |
| Pole vault | Yevgeniy Syuremov (RUS) | 4.70 m | Svit Pintar (SLO) | 4.70 m | Flavien Basson (FRA) | 4.60 m |
| Long jump | Marcos Caldeira (POR) | 7.38 m | Ivan Slepov (RUS) | 7.34 m | Damian Szade (POL) | 7.11 m |
| Triple jump | Lyukman Adams (RUS) | 15.35 m | Fabio Buscella (ITA) | 15.08 m | Ruslan Panasenko (AZE) | 14.85 m |
| Shot put | Nikola Kišanić (CRO) | 19.55 m | Sergey Bakhar (BLR) | 18.45 m | Aleksandr Bolshakov (RUS) | 18.29 m |
| Discus throw | Savvas Arestis (CYP) | 56.83 m | Artur Hoppe (GER) | 56.29 m | António Vital e Silva (POR) | 56.24 m |
| Javelin throw | Leonardo Gottardo (ITA) | 70.79 m | Matthias De Zordo (GER) | 70.62 m | Lauris Jelsmanis (LAT) | 67.83 m |

=== Women ===
| Event | Gold | | Silver | | Bronze | |
|---|---|---|---|---|---|---|
| 100 metres (wind: +3.1 m/s) | Yelyzaveta Bryzhina (UKR) | 11.60 w | Amy Foster (IRL) | 11.84 w | Ezinne Okparaebo (NOR) | 11.85 w |
| 200 metres | Ebe Reier (EST) | 24.37 | Vicki Shier (GBR) | 24.44 | Juliane Stolle (GER) | 24.53 |
| 400 metres | Danijela Grgić (CRO) | 53.12 | Lena Schmidt (GER) | 54.59 | Sjorske Wijnker (NED) | 54.96 |
| 800 metres | Katsiaryna Shaban (BLR) | 2:08.91 | Kamila Zglejc (POL) | 2:09.26 | Machteld Mulder (NED) | 2:09.39 |
| 1500 metres | Poļina Jeļizarova (LAT) | 4:22.01 | Azra Eminović (SCG) | 4:22.31 | Roxana Bârcă (ROU) | 4:26.55 |
| 3000 metres | Azra Eminović (SCG) | 9:22.02 | Poļina Jeļizarova (LAT) | 9:24.18 | Ágnes Kostyál (HUN) | 9:24.28 |
| 100 metres hurdles | Clélia Reuse (SUI) | 13.74 | Arna Erega (CRO) | 13.76 | Julia Förster (GER) | 14.04 |
| 400 metres hurdles | Fabienne Kohlmann (GER) | 58.88 | Anastasiya Buldakova (BLR) | 60.15 | Aneta Pecnová (CZE) | 60.39 |
| 4×100 m relay | Germany (GER); Isabel Galander; Lena Schmidt; Julia Förster; Fabienne Kohlmann | 47.08 | Hungary (HUN); Mónika Vágó; Kitty Mészáros; Kitti Zircher; Viktória Nyusa | 47.10 | France (FRA); Solene Hamelin; Emilie Gaydu; Karelle Jean Baptiste-Simone; Floriane Bernard | 47.22 |
| High jump | Jana Kersevan (SLO) | 1.84 m | Natalya Gapchuk (UKR) | 1.80 m | Hannelore Desmet (BEL) | 1.78 m |
| Pole vault | Rita Obizajeva (LAT) | 3.95 m | Yuliya Zhukova (RUS) | 3.90 m | Jessica Botter (SUI) | 3.90 m |
| Long jump | Kaire Leibak (EST) | 6.40 m | Clélia Reuse (SUI) | 6.36 m | Nina Kokot (SLO) | 6.22 m |
| Triple jump | Kaire Leibak (EST) | 13.47 m | Ganna Knyazyeva (UKR) | 12.86 m | Haykanush Beklaryan (ARM) | 12.74 m |
| Shot put | Melissa Boekelman (NED) | 15.95 m | Zhanna Samolyuk (UKR) | 14.16 m | Sandra Miseikyte (LTU) | 14.10 m |
| Discus throw | Melissa Boekelman (NED) | 51.80 m | Diana Ozolina (LAT) | 48.69 m | Anita Márton (HUN) | 47.27 m |
| Javelin throw | Evelien Dekkers (NED) | 49.76 m | Raine Kuningas (EST) | 48.31 m | Saša Kampic (SLO) | 47.62 m |
