= Figure skating at the 2025 European Youth Olympic Winter Festival =

- Venue: Batumi Ice Arena
- Location: Batumi, Georgia
- Date: 12–14 February

Figure skating at the 2025 European Youth Olympic Winter Festival was held from 12 to 14 February at Batumi Ice Arena in Batumi, Georgia.

== Medal table ==
* Host nation (Georgia)

Rank	Nation	Gold	Silver	Bronze	Total
1	Georgia (GEO)*	1	0	0	1
1	Ukraine (UKR)	1	0	0	1
3	Estonia (EST)	0	2	0	2
4	Switzerland (SUI)	0	0	2	2
Totals (4 entries)		2	2	2	6

== Events ==
Event	Gold		Silver		Bronze	
Boys	Yehor Kurtsev; Ukraine	198.81	Vladislav Churakov; Estonia	182.44	Gion Schmid; Switzerland	176.94
Girls	Inga Gurgenidze; Georgia	187.81	Elina Goidina; Estonia	178.16	Leandra Tzimpoukakis; Switzerland	177.42

== Participating nations ==
- Armenia (2)
- Austria (2)
- Azerbaijan (1)
- Belgium (2)
- Bosnia and Herzegovina (1)
- Bulgaria (2)
- Croatia (1)
- Czech Republic (2)
- Estonia (2)
- Finland (1)
- France (2)
- Georgia (1)
- (United Kingdom) Great Britain (2)
- Germany (2)
- Hungary (1)
- Iceland (1)
- Ireland (1)
- Israel (1)
- Italy (2)
- Latvia (2)
- Liechtenstein (1)
- Lithuania (1)
- Netherlands (1)
- Norway (1)
- Poland (2)
- Slovakia (2)
- Slovenia (2)
- Spain (2)
- Switzerland (2)
- Turkey (2)
- Ukraine (2)
