= Bakuriani K-115 =

Coordinates: 41°44′41″N 43°32′23″E

Sakartwelo
- Location: Bakuriani; Georgia
- Opened: 1969

Size
- K–point: K-115
- Hill record: Sergei Zontov (115,5 m in 1971)

The K-115 ski jumping hill in Bakuriani, Georgia was built in 1969. There is also a K-90, K-70 and K-45 in Bakuriani. All hills, including the K115, are covered with plastic mattings.
