= Tiiu Asper =

Estonian judoka (born 1983)

Tiiu Asper (born 19 September 1983) is an Estonian judoka.

She was born in Tartu. In 2007 she graduated from University of Tartu's Faculty of Medicine.

She began her judo career in 1991. Her coaches have been Jevgeni Kupri and Andres Põhjala. She is two-times Estonian champion. 1998–2003 she was a member of Estonian national judo team.

In 1998 and 1999 she was named as Best Junior Judoka of Estonia.
