= 2025 European Youth Olympic Winter Festival =

2025 European Youth Winter Olympic Festival
- Host city: Bakuriani, Georgia
- Country: Georgia
- Motto: Ready To Shine
- Nations: 45
- Athletes: 901
- Sport: 8
- Events: 38
- Opening: 9 February 2025
- Closing: 16 February 2025
- Opened by: Mikheil Kavelashvili
- Torch lighter: Koba Tsakadze; Anastasia Mirianashvili
- Website: www.eyof2025.ge

Summer

Winter

The 2025 European Youth Olympic Winter Festival was the 17th edition of the European Youth Winter Olympic Festival, held from 9 to 16 February 2025 in Bakuriani, Georgia, as main host city. In addition to Bakurani, events taken place in Batumi and Tbilisi. This was Georgia's first time as host of the winter festival, and the second time hosting the festival after the summer edition in 2015 in Tbilisi.

== Bidding process ==
On 26 October 2019 it was announced that the festival would be hosted by Bakuriani.

== Sports ==
The following competitions will take place:

2025 European Youth Olympic Winter Festival Sports Programme
- Alpine skiing (5)
- Biathlon (6)
- Cross-country skiing (7)
- Figure skating (2)
- Freestyle skiing (4)
- Ice hockey (2)
- Short-track speed skating (7)
- Snowboarding (4)

For infrastructure reasons, this edition will only have mandatory sports in its program

== Venues ==
Venue	Location	Sports
Bakuriani Biathlon-Cross Country Stadium	Bakuriani	Opening ceremony
Bakuriani Biathlon-Cross Country Stadium	Bakuriani	Closing ceremony
Bakuriani Biathlon-Cross Country Stadium	Bakuriani	Cross-country skiing
Didveli	Bakuriani	Freestyle skiing
Didveli	Bakuriani	Alpine skiing
Didveli	Bakuriani	Snowboarding
Batumi Ice Arena	Batumi	Figure skating
Batumi Ice Arena	Batumi	Short-track speed skating
Tbilisi Ice Arena	Tbilisi	Ice hockey

== Marketing ==
=== Logo ===
The logo is depicting a fusion of the old Asomtavruli alphabet and traditional Georgian ornaments.

=== Mascot ===
The official mascot, a Caucasian lynx named Gunda, was unveiled on 28 February 2024. The name is based on the Georgian word for Snowball.

== Schedule ==
The competition schedule for the 2025 European Youth Olympic Winter Festival is as follows:

OC	Opening ceremony	1	Event finals	CC	Closing ceremony	●	Event competitions

February	6 Thu	7 Fri	8 Sat	9 Sun	10 Mon	11 Tue	12 Wed	13 Thu	14 Fri	15 Sat	16 Sun	Events
Ceremonies				OC							CC	
Alpine skiing					1	1		1	1		1	5
Biathlon					2		1		2		1	6
Cross-country skiing						2		2		2	1	7
Figure skating							●	1	1			2
Freestyle skiing					●		2		●	2		4
Ice hockey	●	●	●	●	1		●	●	●	●	1	2
Short-track speed skating					2	2				3		7
Snowboarding						●	2		●	2		4
Total events					6	5	5	4	4	9	4	37
Cumulative total					6	11	16	20	24	33	37	37
February	6 Thu	7 Fri	8 Sat	9 Sun	10 Mon	11 Tue	12 Wed	13 Thu	14 Fri	15 Sat	16 Sun	Events

== Medal table ==
* Host nation (Georgia)

Rank	Nation	Gold	Silver	Bronze	Total
1	Italy	7	6	3	16
2	France	5	9	5	19
3	Switzerland	4	0	7	11
4	Great Britain	3	0	2	5
4	Ukraine	3	0	2	5
6	Poland	2	2	0	4
7	Norway	2	1	1	4
7	Slovakia	2	1	1	4
9	Spain	2	1	0	3
10	Estonia	1	4	1	6
11	Czech Republic	1	3	3	7
12	Sweden	1	2	2	5
13	Hungary	1	1	2	4
14	Austria	1	1	1	3
15	Georgia*	1	0	0	1
15	Netherlands	1	0	0	1
17	Finland	0	3	1	4
18	Germany	0	1	3	4
19	Denmark	0	1	0	1
19	Slovenia	0	1	0	1
21	Turkey	0	0	2	2
22	Croatia	0	0	1	1
Totals (22 entries)		37	37	37	111

== Participant nations ==
901 athletes from 45 nations are expected to participate:

Participating National Olympic Committees (45)
- Albania (1)
- Armenia (6)
- Austria (53)
- Azerbaijan (1)
- Belgium (8)
- Bosnia and Herzegovina (2)
- Bulgaria (16)
- Croatia (14)
- Cyprus (2)
- Czech Republic (79)
- Denmark (11)
- Estonia (23)
- Finland (53)
- France (37)
- Georgia (11)
- Germany (6)
- (United Kingdom) Great Britain (20)
- Greece (12)
- Hungary (21)
- Iceland (16)
- Ireland (4)
- Israel (3)
- Italy (57)
- Kosovo (2)
- Latvia (42)
- Liechtenstein (4)
- Lithuania (16)
- Moldova (3)
- Monaco (1)
- Montenegro (1)
- Netherlands (11)
- North Macedonia (4)
- Norway (17)
- Poland (32)
- Portugal (2)
- Romania (20)
- San Marino (3)
- Serbia (4)
- Slovakia (62)
- Slovenia (32)
- Spain (13)
- Sweden (33)
- Switzerland (75)
- Turkey (18)
- Ukraine (50)
