= Cycling at the 2019 European Youth Summer Olympic Festival =

- Venue: Velopark + Baku city roads
- Dates: 23–25 July
- Competitors: 166 from 36 nations

The cycling competitions of the 2019 European Youth Summer Olympic Festival in Baku, Azerbaijan, were held in the Velopark and around the roads of the city from 23 to 25 July 2019.

Time trials had 10 km for both categories and road races had 75 km for boys, respectively 50 km for girls.

Madis Mihkels from Estonia and Zoë Backstedt of Great Britain won both individual race, time trial and road race.

== Medalists ==
Event	Gold		Silver		Bronze	
Boys road race	Madis Mihkels; Estonia	1:49:24	Dario Belletta; Italy	1:49:24	Martin Svrček; Slovakia	1:49:24
Boys individual time trial	Madis Mihkels; Estonia	13:10.19	Dario Belletta; Italy	13:16.12	Konstantin Aladashvili; Russia	13:16.42
Girls road race	Zoe Bäckstedt; Great Britain	1:21:00	Francesca Barale; Italy	1:22:04	Alena Ivanchenko; Russia	1:22:09
Girls individual time trial	Zoe Bäckstedt; Great Britain	14:35.25	Alena Ivanchenko; Russia	14:54.39	Laura Lizette Sander; Estonia	15:33.00

== Medal table ==
* Host nation (Azerbaijan)

Rank	Nation	Gold	Silver	Bronze	Total
1	Estonia (EST)	2	0	1	3
2	Great Britain (GBR)	2	0	0	2
3	Italy (ITA)	0	3	0	3
4	Russia (RUS)	0	1	2	3
5	Slovakia (SVK)	0	0	1	1
Totals (5 entries)		4	4	4	12

== Participating nations ==
A total of 166 athletes from 36 nations competed in cycling at the 2019 European Youth Summer Olympic Festival:

- Albania (2)
- Austria (6)
- Azerbaijan (6)
- Belarus (6)
- Belgium (6)
- Bosnia and Herzegovina (1)
- Croatia (1)
- Cyprus (2)
- Czech Republic (6)
- Estonia (6)
- Finland (4)
- Georgia (3)
- Germany (6)
- Great Britain (6)
- Greece (2)
- Hungary (4)
- Iceland (3)
- Ireland (6)
- Israel (4)
- Italy (6)
- Latvia (6)
- Lithuania (6)
- Luxembourg (6)
- Moldova (2)
- Poland (6)
- Portugal (5)
- Romania (4)
- Russia (5)
- Serbia (3)
- Slovenia (6)
- Slovakia (5)
- Spain (4)
- Sweden (6)
- Switzerland (6)
- Turkey (6)
- Ukraine (4)
