= Freestyle skiing at the 2023 European Youth Olympic Winter Festival =

- Venue: Ski Area Ravascletto Zoncolan
- Date: 22–27 January
- Website: eyof2023.it

Freestyle skiing at the 2023 European Youth Olympic Winter Festival was held from 22 to 27 January at Ski Area Ravascletto Zoncolan in Ravascletto, Italy. This was the first time freestyle skiing has been included in the EYOF programme.

== Medal summary ==
=== Boys' events ===
Event	Gold		Silver		Bronze	
Big air	Fadri Rhyner; Switzerland	179.7	Nil Brocart Alegre; France	177.5	Henry Sildaru; Estonia	177.2
Slopestyle	Fadri Rhyner; Switzerland	90.50	Stefan Sorokin; Estonia	85.50	Petr Müller; Czech Republic	83.50
Ski cross	Nico Offenwanger; Germany		William Young Shing; Sweden		Paolo Piccolo; Italy	

=== Girls' events ===
Event	Gold		Silver		Bronze	
Big air	Lina Häggström; Finland	159.7	Bérénice Dode; France	150.2	Nataliia Kaziuk; Ukraine	133.7
Slopestyle	Lina Häggström; Finland	84.75	Liina Kuivalainen; Finland	82.50	Carolina Vitale Cesa; Italy	80.75
Ski cross	Chiara von Moos; Switzerland		Mattli Fersch; Germany		Alexandra Nilsson; Sweden	

=== Medal table ===
* Host nation (Italy)

Rank	Nation	Gold	Silver	Bronze	Total
1	Switzerland (SUI)	3	0	0	3
2	Finland (FIN)	2	1	0	3
3	Germany (GER)	1	1	0	2
4	France (FRA)	0	2	0	2
5	Estonia (EST)	0	1	1	2
5	Sweden (SWE)	0	1	1	2
7	Italy (ITA)*	0	0	2	2
8	Czech Republic (CZE)	0	0	1	1
8	Ukraine (UKR)	0	0	1	1
Totals (9 entries)		6	6	6	18
