= Georgi Ladõgin =

Estonian judoka

Georgi Ladõgin (born 3 February 1989) is an Estonian judoka.

He was born in Tallinn. In 2013 he graduated from Tallinn University of Technology in international relations speciality.

He began his judo career in 1995, coached by Juri Kuklev. Later his coaches have been Anatoli Sergejev, Dmitri and Aleksei Budõlin. He is multiple-times Estonian champion. 2005–2016 he was a member of Estonian national judo team.
