= Vlado Gorišek =

Slovenian civil engineer

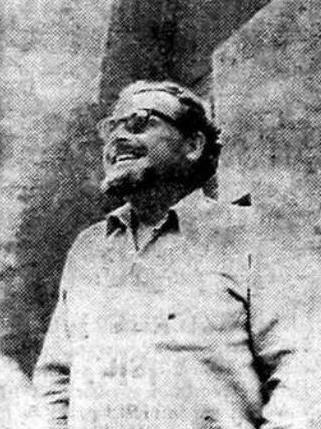
- Gorišek in 1969
- Born: 4 January 1925; Ljubljana, Kingdom of Yugoslavia
- Died: 14 June 1997 (aged 72); Ljubljana, Slovenia
- Education: Faculty of Civil Engineering and Geodesy, University of Ljubljana
- Occupation: Architect
- Buildings: Letalnica bratov Gorišek (Planica, Slovenia)

Vlado Gorišek, known as Lado Gorišek (4 January 1925 – 14 June 1997), was a Slovenian civil engineer, constructor, and architect.

== Career ==
His works were mainly constructions of ski jumping and ski flying hills worldwide. His best-known work is the Gorišek Brothers Ski Flying Hill (Letalnica bratov Gorišek) in Planica, Slovenia, which is currently the world's second-largest ski flying hill. He oversaw its construction together with his brother Janez Gorišek.
