= Planica Nordic Centre =

Skiing venue in Planica, Slovenia

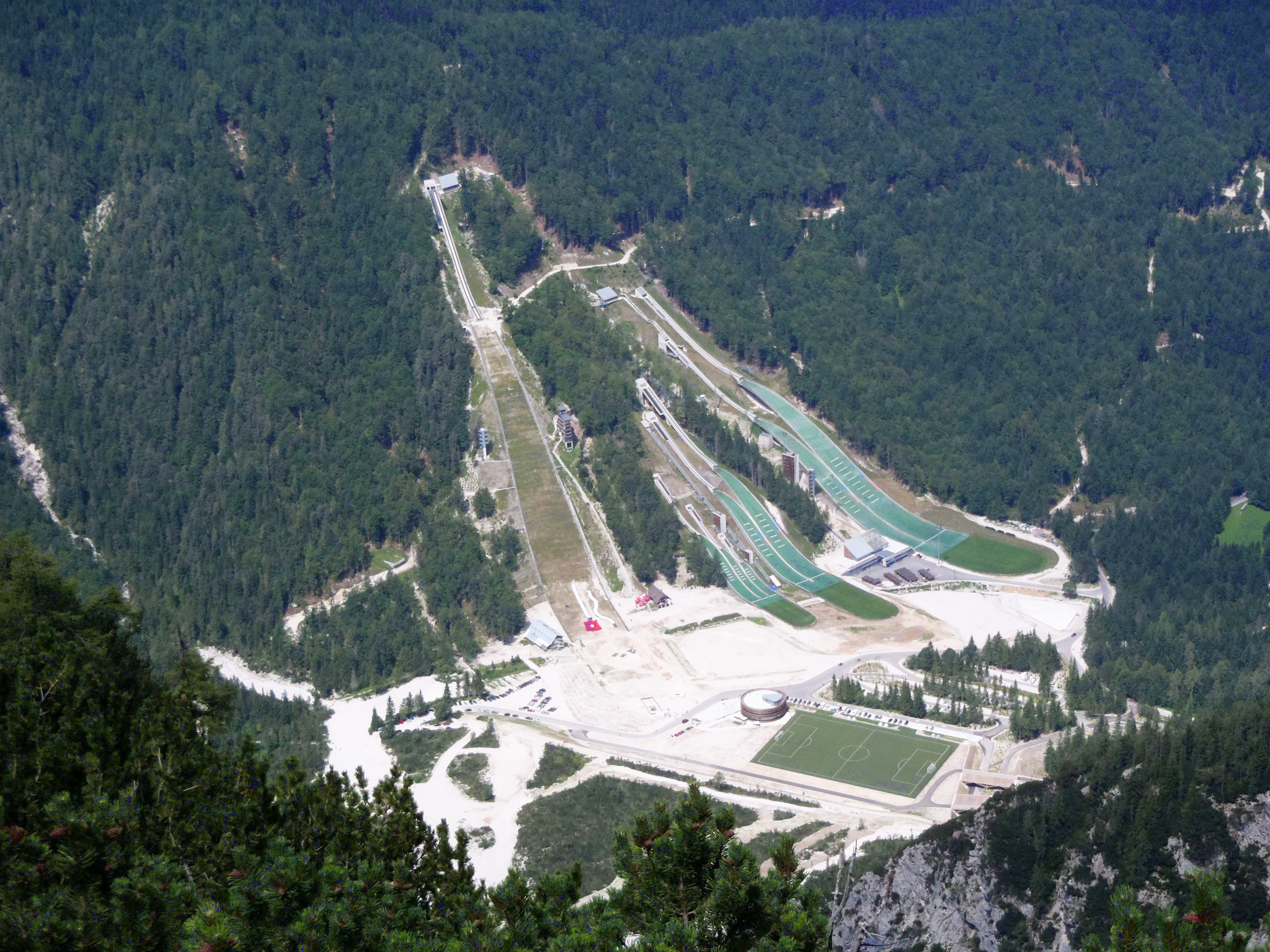
- Planica Nordic Centre in 2016
- Interactive map of Planica Nordic Centre
- Full name: Nordijski center Planica
- Location: Planica, Municipality of Kranjska Gora, Slovenia
- Coordinates: 46.4758°N 13.7240°E
- Operator: ZŠRS Planica
- Event: Sporting events

Construction
- Groundbreaking: July 2011
- Built: 2011–2015
- Opened: 11 December 2015
- Cost: €40 million

Website
- www.nc-planica.si

The Planica Nordic Centre (Slovene: Nordijski center Planica) is a Nordic skiing complex located in Planica, Slovenia. It has one ski flying hill, seven ski jumping hills, and a cross-country skiing track. It is the only nordic centre in the world with eight ski jumping hills. The first plans for the Nordic Centre were made in 2006. Construction work began in 2011, and the complex was officially opened in December 2015.

== Ski jumping hills ==
There are a total of eight ski jumping hills at the Planica Nordic Centre. The complex consists of one ski flying hill, one large hill, one normal hill, and five smaller hills for youth ski jumpers and children.

=== Letalnica bratov Gorišek ===
Letalnica bratov Gorišek is the biggest of eight hills at the Planica Nordic Centre, and is used for ski flying events. It was built in 1969 by Vlado and Janez Gorišek. Since its opening, a total of 29 world records have been set at the venue. In 1994, Toni Nieminen landed at 203 metres (666 ft) and became the first man in history to jump over 200 metres. The hill hosted the FIS Ski Flying World Championships on seven occasions, most recently in 2020.

The world's steepest zip line with an average incline of 38 degrees opened at the hill in September 2015.

=== Bloudkova velikanka ===
Bloudkova velikanka is a large ski jumping hill. Originally built in 1934 by Ivan Rožman, the hill collapsed in 2001 and was completely renovated in 2012. A total of ten world records were set on the hill during the 1930s and 1940s. Next to the large hill, they also built a new normal hill to replace the old demolished one.

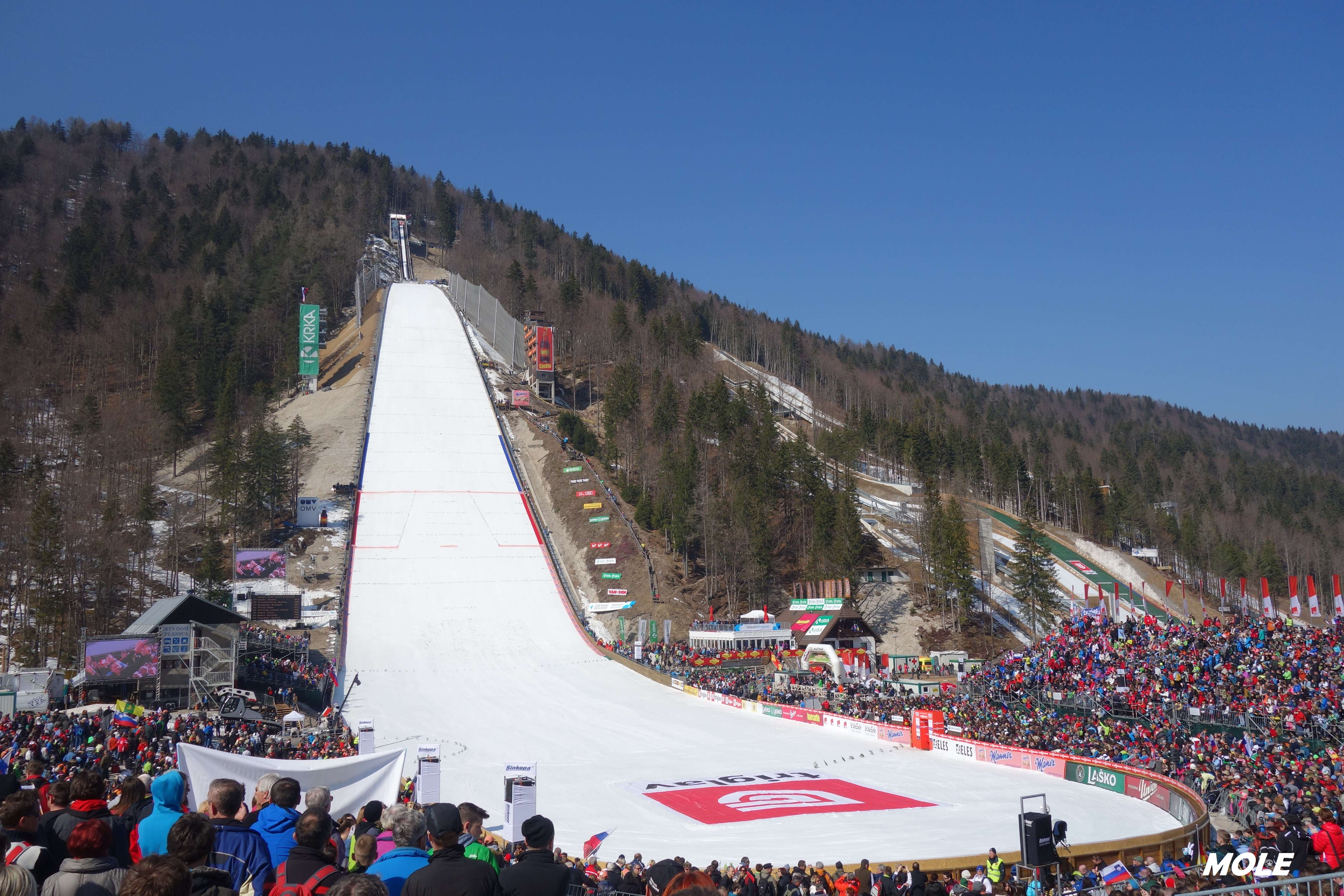
Letalnica bratov Gorišek

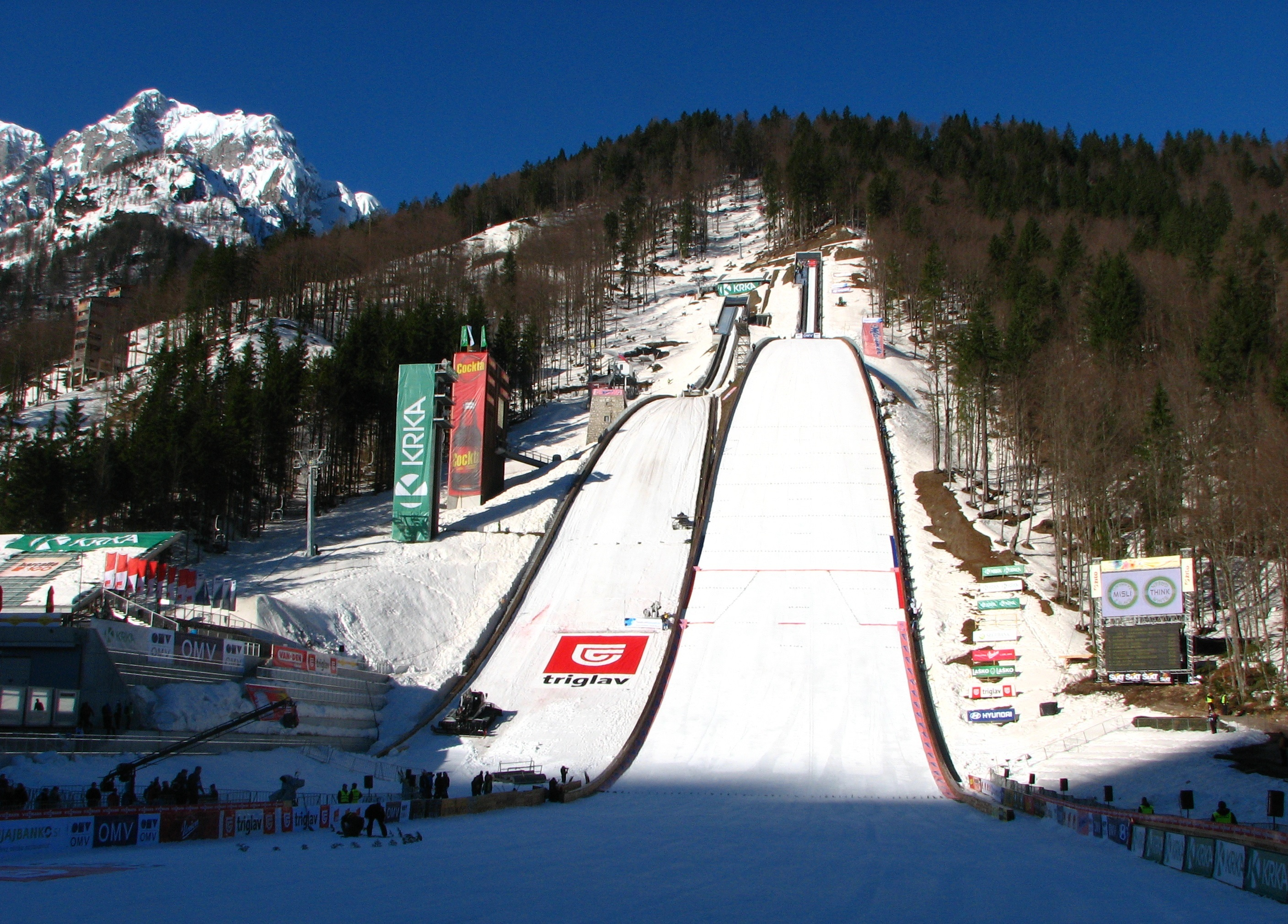
Bloudkova velikanka

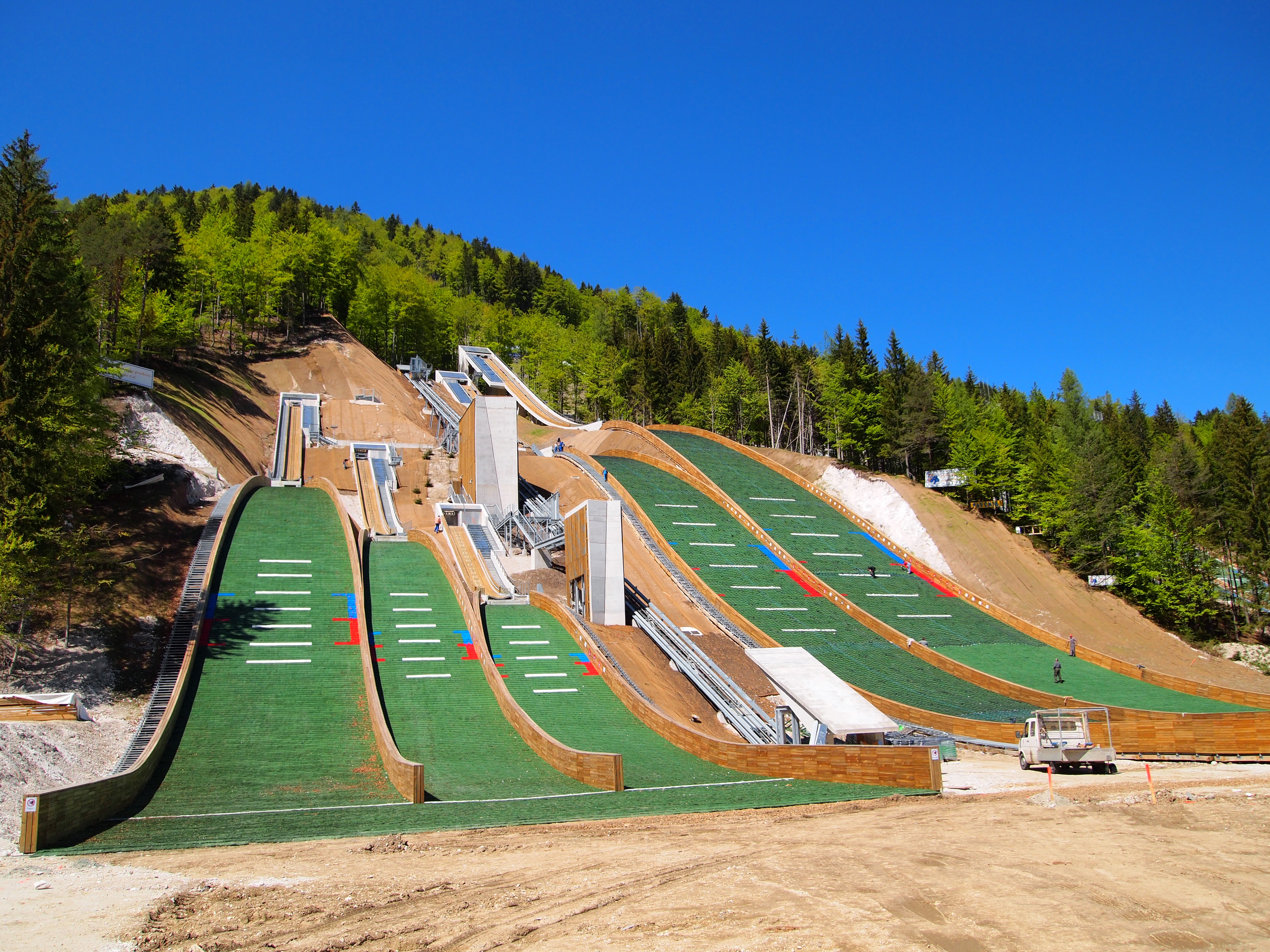
Five smaller hills

== Other facilities ==
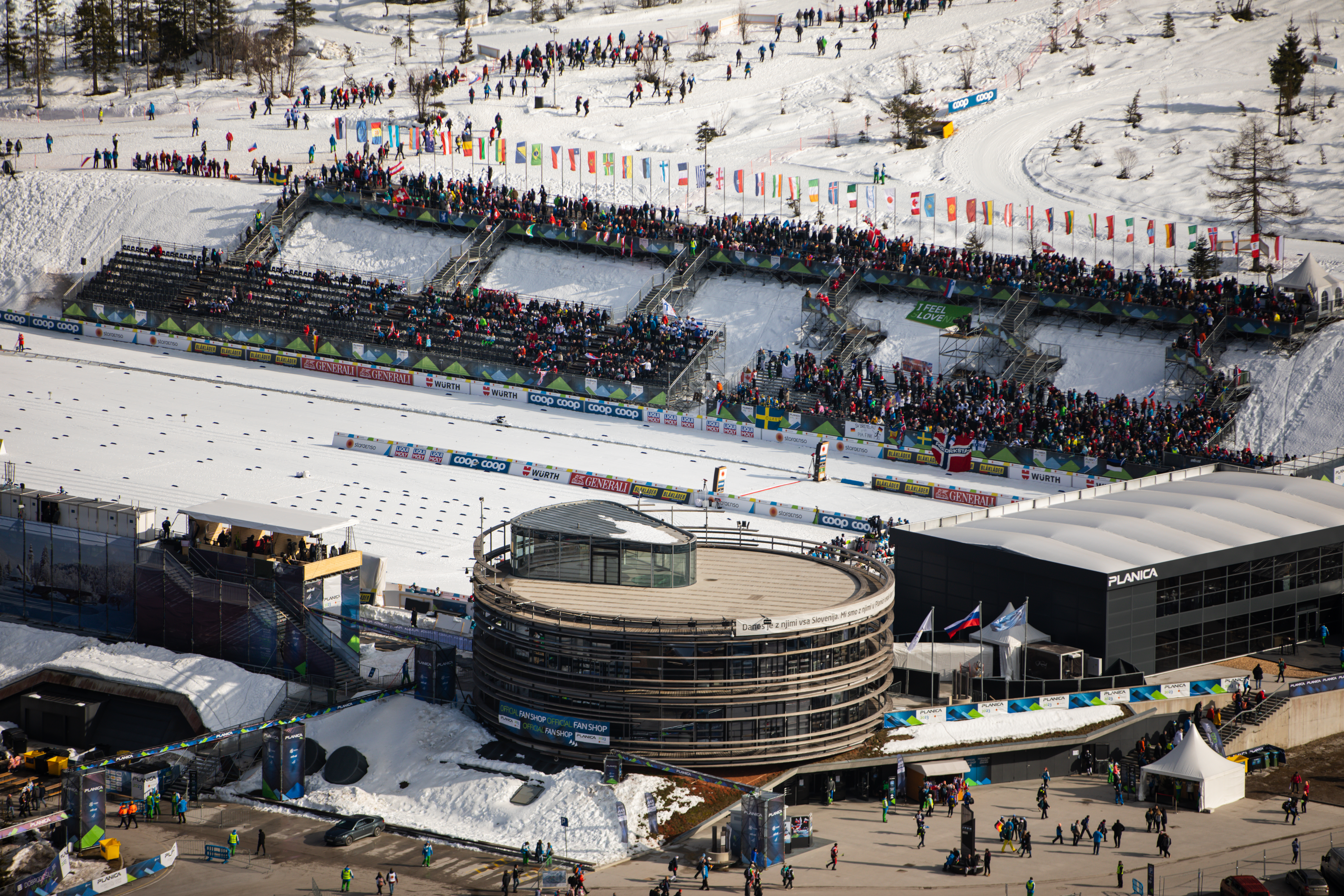
Cross-country skiing stadium

- Cross-country skiing track
- Artificial turf football field (converted into a cross-country skiing stadium for skiing events)
- Central building (administrative part, wind tunnel, restaurant, museum)
- Čaplja service facility
- Hotel Dom Planica

== Nordic World Ski Championships ==
=== Cross-country skiing ===
Date	Event	Winner	Second place	Third place
Men
23 February 2023	Sprint classical	(Norway) Johannes Høsflot Klæbo	(Norway) Pål Golberg	(France) Jules Chappaz
24 February 2023	30 km skiathlon	(Norway) Simen Hegstad Krüger	(Norway) Johannes Høsflot Klæbo	(Norway) Sjur Røthe
26 February 2023	Team sprint freestyle	Norway Pål Golberg; Johannes Høsflot Klæbo	Italy Francesco De Fabiani; Federico Pellegrino	France Renaud Jay; Richard Jouve
1 March 2023	15 km freestyle individual	(Norway) Simen Hegstad Krüger	(Norway) Harald Østberg Amundsen	(Norway) Hans Christer Holund
3 March 2023	4 × 10 km relay	Norway Hans Christer Holund; Pål Golberg; Simen Hegstad Krüger; Johannes Høsflot Klæbo	Finland Ristomatti Hakola; Iivo Niskanen; Perttu Hyvärinen; Niko Anttola	Germany Albert Kuchler; Janosch Brugger; Jonas Dobler; Friedrich Moch
5 March 2023	50 km classical mass start	(Norway) Pål Golberg	(Norway) Johannes Høsflot Klæbo	(Sweden) William Poromaa
Women
23 February 2023	Sprint classical	(Sweden) Jonna Sundling	(Sweden) Emma Ribom	(Sweden) Maja Dahlqvist
25 February 2023	15 km skiathlon	(Sweden) Ebba Andersson	(Sweden) Frida Karlsson	(Norway) Astrid Øyre Slind
26 February 2023	Team sprint freestyle	Sweden Emma Ribom; Jonna Sundling	Norway Anne Kjersti Kalvå; Tiril Udnes Weng	United States Jessie Diggins; Julia Kern
28 February 2023	10 km freestyle individual	(United States) Jessie Diggins	(Sweden) Frida Karlsson	(Sweden) Ebba Andersson
2 March 2023	4 × 5 km relay	Norway Tiril Udnes Weng; Astrid Øyre Slind; Ingvild Flugstad Østberg; Anne Kjersti Kalvå	Germany Laura Gimmler; Katharina Hennig; Pia Fink; Victoria Carl	Sweden Emma Ribom; Ebba Andersson; Frida Karlsson; Maja Dahlqvist
4 March 2023	30 km classical mass start	(Sweden) Ebba Andersson	(Norway) Anne Kjersti Kalvå	(Sweden) Frida Karlsson

=== Nordic combined ===
Date	Event	Winner	Second place	Third place
Women
24 February 2023	Individual normal hill / 5 km	(Norway) Gyda Westvold Hansen	(Germany) Nathalie Armbruster	(Japan) Haruka Kasai
Men
25 February 2023	Individual normal hill / 10 km	(Norway) Jarl Magnus Riiber	(Germany) Julian Schmid	(Austria) Franz-Josef Rehrl
1 March 2023	Team large hill / 4 × 5 km	Norway Espen Andersen; Jens Lurås Oftebro; Jørgen Graabak; Jarl Magnus Riiber	Germany Eric Frenzel; Vinzenz Geiger; Johannes Rydzek; Julian Schmid	Austria Martin Fritz; Lukas Greiderer; Stefan Rettenegger; Johannes Lamparter
4 March 2023	Individual large hill / 10 km	(Norway) Jarl Magnus Riiber	(Norway) Jens Lurås Oftebro	(Austria) Johannes Lamparter
Mixed team
26 February 2023	Mixed team normal hill	Norway Jens Lurås Oftebro; Ida Marie Hagen; Gyda Westvold Hansen; Jarl Magnus Riiber	Germany Vinzenz Geiger; Jenny Nowak; Nathalie Armbruster; Julian Schmid	Austria Stefan Rettenegger; Annalena Slamik; Lisa Hirner; Johannes Lamparter

== World Cup ==
=== Cross-country skiing ===
Date	Event	Winner	Second place	Third place
Men
16 January 2016	Sprint freestyle	(Italy) Federico Pellegrino	(France) Baptiste Gros	(France) Richard Jouve
17 January 2016	Team sprint freestyle	Italy I Dietmar Nöckler; Federico Pellegrino	France I Renaud Jay; Baptiste Gros	France II Valentin Chauvin; Richard Jouve
20 January 2018	Sprint classical	(Norway) Johannes Høsflot Klæbo	(Norway) Emil Iversen	(Sweden) Teodor Peterson
21 January 2018	15 km classical	(Kazakhstan) Alexey Poltoranin	(Norway) Johannes Høsflot Klæbo	(Sweden) Calle Halfvarsson
21 December 2019	Sprint freestyle	(France) Lucas Chanavat	(Italy) Federico Pellegrino	(Norway) Erik Valnes
22 December 2019	Team sprint freestyle	Norway I Sindre Bjørnestad Skar; Erik Valnes	Norway II Gjøran Tefre; Håvard Solås Taugbøl	Finland I Ristomatti Hakola; Joni Mäki
Women
16 January 2016	Sprint freestyle	(Sweden) Stina Nilsson	(Norway) Astrid Uhrenholdt Jacobsen	(Norway) Heidi Weng
17 January 2016	Team sprint freestyle	Sweden I Ida Ingemarsdotter; Stina Nilsson	Norway I Heidi Weng; Astrid Uhrenholdt Jacobsen	Germany I Sandra Ringwald; Hanna Kolb
20 January 2018	Sprint classical	(Sweden) Stina Nilsson	(Norway) Kathrine Harsem	(Norway) Maiken Caspersen Falla
21 January 2018	10 km classical	(Finland) Krista Pärmäkoski	(Sweden) Charlotte Kalla	(Norway) Heidi Weng
21 December 2019	Sprint freestyle	(Sweden) Jonna Sundling	(Sweden) Stina Nilsson	(United States) Julia Kern
22 December 2019	Team sprint freestyle	Sweden II Maja Dahlqvist; Linn Svahn	Sweden I Stina Nilsson; Jonna Sundling	Switzerland Laurien van der Graaff; Nadine Fähndrich

== Red Bull 400 ==
Red Bull 400 is the world's steepest 400-metre race. Competitors must overcome a distance of 400 metres from the bottom to the top of the inrun of the Letalnica bratov Gorišek. The first two editions at the venue took place in 2012 and 2013. The event was cancelled in 2014 as the hill was under renovation. The competition returned in 2015 on a modernized and even bigger hill with a new concrete inrun.

=== Men's ===
Edition	Date	Winner	Time
1	22 September 2012	(Turkey) Arslan Ahmet	5:02
2	12 May 2013	(Slovenia) Simon Alič	5:11
3	19 September 2015	(Turkey) Ahmet Arslan	5:08
4	17 September 2016	(Turkey) Ahmet Arslan	5:09
5	16 September 2017	(Slovenia) Luka Kovačič	5:05
6	15 September 2018	(Slovenia) Luka Kovačič	4:59
7	14 September 2019	(Slovenia) Luka Kovačič	4:56
8	11 September 2021	(Slovenia) Luka Kovačič	4:53
9	10 September 2022	(Slovenia) Luka Kovačič	5:01
10	2 September 2023	(Austria) Christof Hochenwarter	4:52

=== Women's ===
Edition	Date	Winner	Time
1	22 September 2012	(Austria) Teresa Stadlober	6:46
2	12 May 2013	(Austria) Teresa Stadlober	6:37
3	19 September 2015	(Italy) Antonella Confortola	6:25
4	17 September 2016	(Italy) Valentina Belotti	6:20
5	16 September 2017	(Poland) Dominika Wiśniewska-Ulfik	6:41
6	15 September 2018	(Slovenia) Barbara Trunkelj	6:27
7	14 September 2019	(Slovenia) Barbara Trunkelj	6:24
8	11 September 2021	(Slovenia) Barbara Trunkelj	6:11
9	10 September 2022	(Slovenia) Barbara Trunkelj	6:15
10	2 September 2023	(Croatia) Tea Faber	6:52
