= 1993 European Youth Olympic Winter Days =

1993 edition of the European Youth Olympic Winter Festival

- Host city: Aosta
- Country: Italy
- Nations: 33
- Athletes: 708
- Sport: 5
- Events: 17
- Opening: 7 February 1993
- Closing: 10 February 1993

Summer

Winter

The 1993 European Youth Olympic Winter Days was the inaugural edition of multi-sport event for European youths between the ages of 13 and 18 in winter sports. It was held in Aosta, Italy, between 7 and 10 February 1993.

== Sports ==
1993 European Youth Olympic Winter Days Sports Programme
- Alpine skiing (4)
- Biathlon (2)
- Cross-country skiing (4)
- Figure skating (3)
- Short track speed skating (4)

== Medalists ==
=== Alpine skiing ===
Event	Gold	Silver	Bronze
Boys giant slalom	Gui-Philippe Benny; Switzerland	Marc Kuehni; Switzerland	Patrik Cogoli; Italy
Girls giant slalom	Raquel Rienda; Spain	Anna Ottoson; Sweden	Gro Kvinlog; Norway
Boys slalom	Drago Grubelnik; Slovenia	Omar Gandelli; Italy	Romain Valla; France
Girls slalom	Marlise Oester; Switzerland	Cecilie Hagen Larsen; Norway	Catherine Borghi; Switzerland

=== Biathlon ===
Event	Gold	Silver	Bronze
Boys 7,5 km	Paolo Longo; Italy	Glenn Olsson; Sweden	Wojciech Kozub; Poland
Girls 5 km	Manuela Ronner Miller; Italy	Alessia Danne; Italy	Biborka Xantus; Romania

=== Cross-country skiing ===
Event	Gold	Silver	Bronze
Boys 7,5 km classic	Ivan Kovalev; Russia	Sergey Skvortsov; Russia	Martin Bajčičák; Slovakia
Girls 5 km classic	Elina Pienimäki; Finland	Yuliya Chepalova; Russia	Kristiina Šmigun; Estonia
Boys 7,5 km free	Sergey Skvortsov; Russia	Ivan Kovalev; Russia	Fabio Santus; Italy
Girls 5 km free	Yuliya Chepalova; Russia	Kristiina Šmigun; Estonia	Katerina Hanusova; Czech Republic

=== Figure skating ===
Event	Gold	Silver	Bronze
Boys	Iliya Kulik; Russia	Thierry Cerez; France	Markus Leminen; Finland
Girls	Irina Slutskaya; Russia	Elena Liashenko; Ukraine	Katerina Berankova; Czech Republic
Ice dancing	Sebastian Kolasinski; Sylwią Nowak; Poland	Sergei Sakhnovski; Ekaterina Svirina; Russia	Alexis Gayet; Agnes Jacquemard; France

=== Short track speed skating ===
Event	Gold	Silver	Bronze
Boys 1000 m	Stijn Turcksin; Belgium	Voler Glebov; Russia	Fabio Carta; Italy
Girls 500 m	Petra Vincze; Hungary	Evgenia Radanova; Bulgaria	Anna Krasteva; Bulgaria
Boys 3000 m relay	Team Italy; Italy	Team Belgium; Belgium	Team Great Britain; Great Britain
Girls 1000 m relay	Team Italy; Italy	Team Ukraine; Ukraine	N/A

== Medal table ==
* Host nation (Italy)

Rank	Nation	Gold	Silver	Bronze	Total
1	Russia (RUS)	5	5	0	10
2	Italy (ITA)*	4	2	3	9
3	Switzerland (SUI)	2	1	1	4
4	Belgium (BEL)	1	1	0	2
5	Finland (FIN)	1	0	1	2
5	Poland (POL)	1	0	1	2
7	Hungary (HUN)	1	0	0	1
7	Slovenia (SLO)	1	0	0	1
7	Spain (SPA)	1	0	0	1
10	Sweden (SWE)	0	2	0	2
10	Ukraine (UKR)	0	2	0	2
12	France (FRA)	0	1	2	3
13	Bulgaria (BUL)	0	1	1	2
13	Estonia (EST)	0	1	1	2
13	Norway (NOR)	0	1	1	2
16	Czech Republic (CZE)	0	0	2	2
17	Great Britain (GBR)	0	0	1	1
17	Romania (ROM)	0	0	1	1
17	Slovakia (SVK)	0	0	1	1
Totals (19 entries)		17	17	16	50
