= Planica =

Alpine valley in Slovenia

Coordinates: 46°28′37″N 13°43′20″E

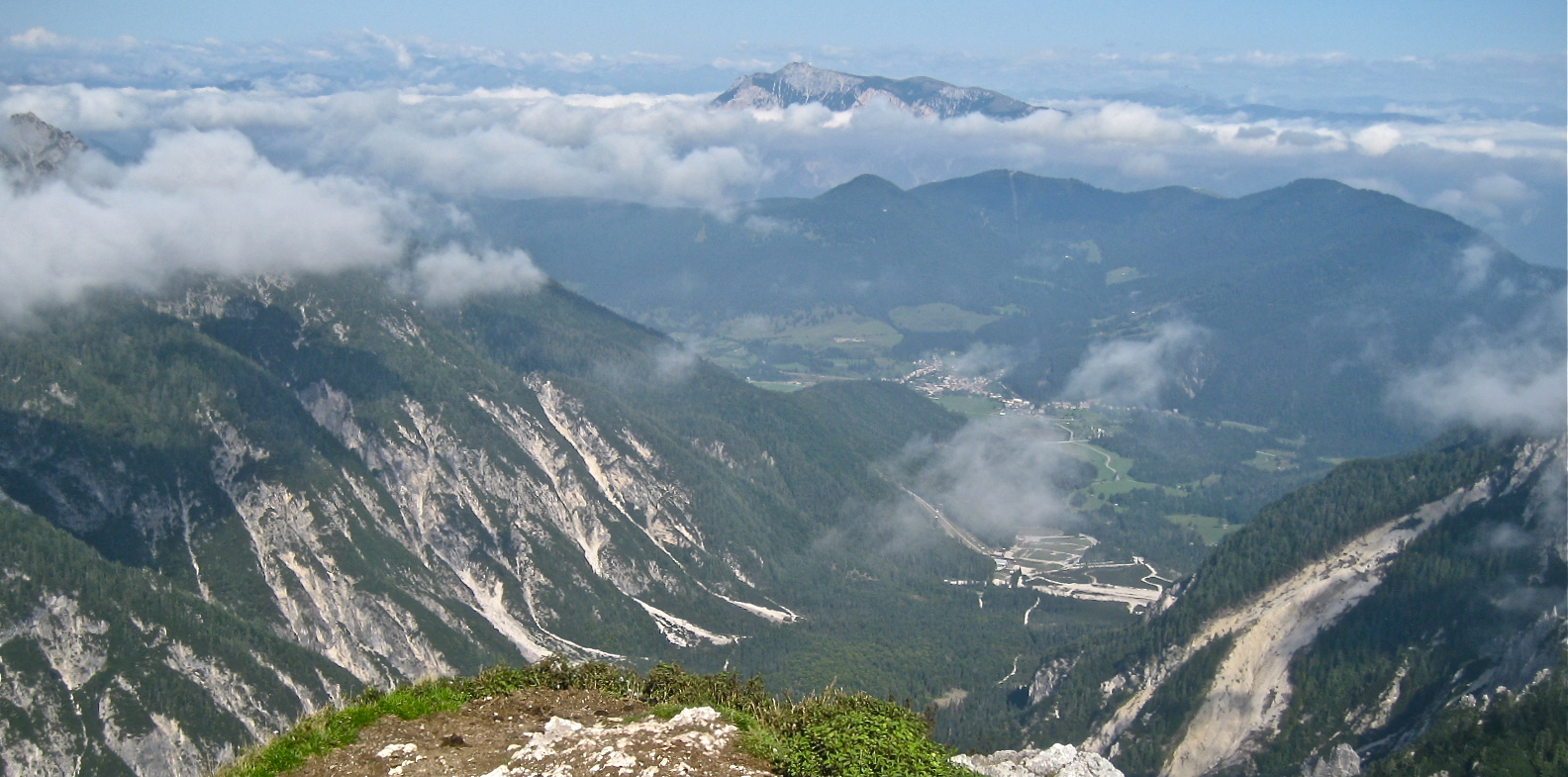
View of Planica from Slemenova špica

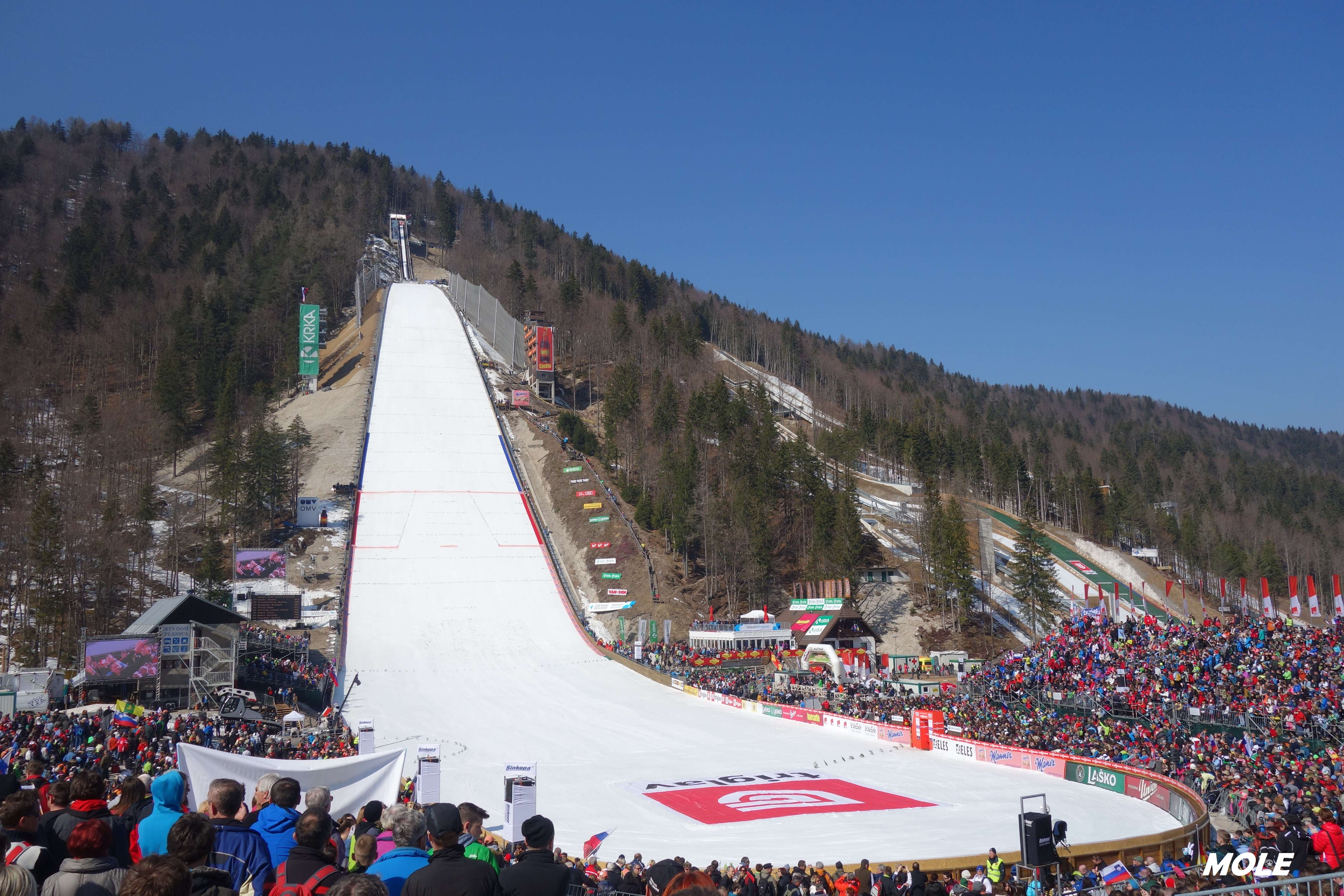
Letalnica bratov Gorišek during a world cup competition

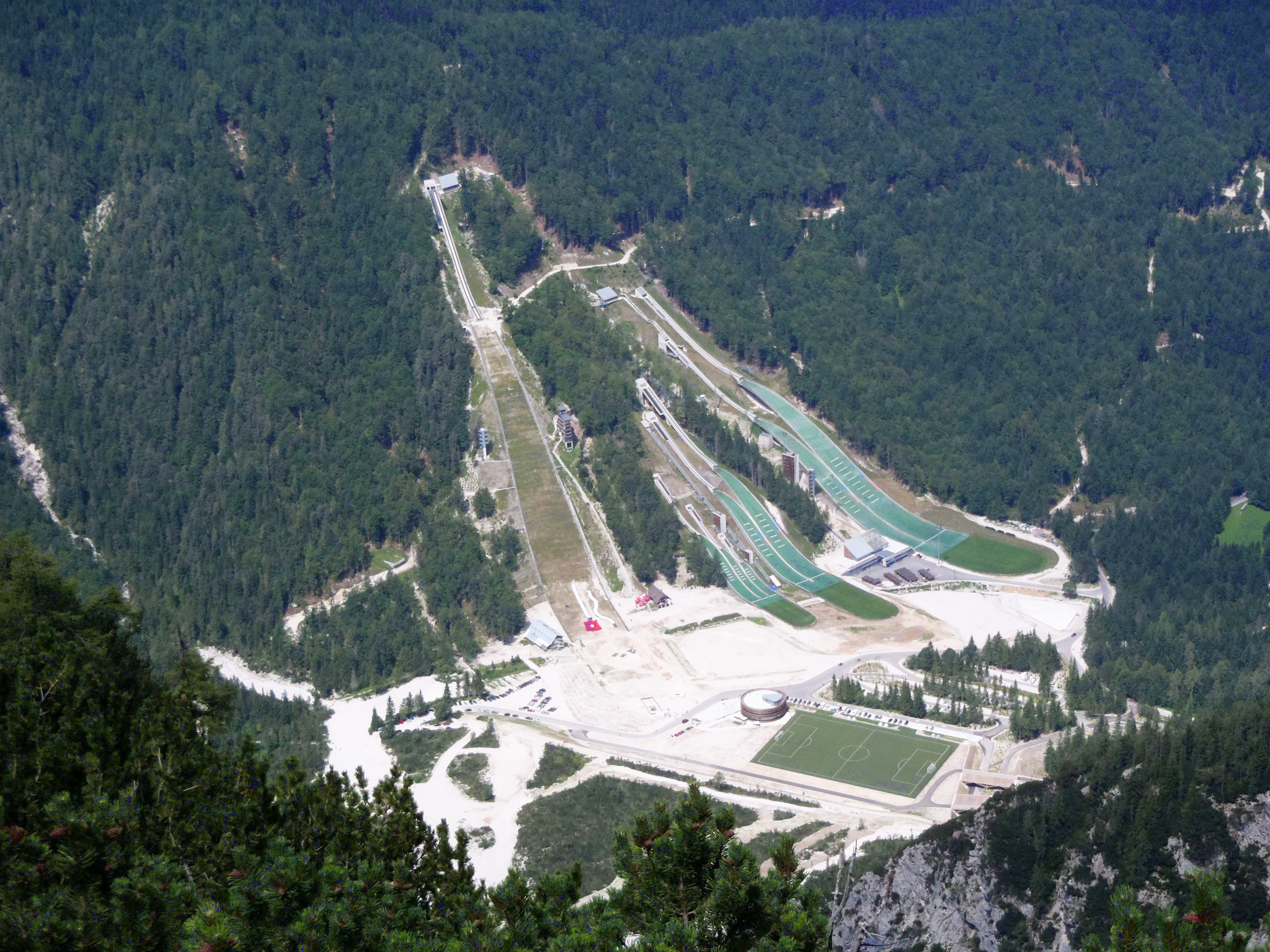
View of the Planica Nordic Centre from Mt. Ciprnik (July 2016)

Planica (Slovene pronunciation: [plaˈnìːtsa]) is an Alpine valley in northwestern Slovenia, extending south from the border village of Rateče, not far from another well-known ski resort, Kranjska Gora. Further south, the valley extends into the Tamar Valley, a popular hiking destination in Triglav National Park.

Planica is famous for ski jumping. The first ski jumping hill was constructed before 1930 at the slope of Mount Ponca. In 1933, Ivan Rožman constructed a larger hill, known as the Bloudek Giant (Bloudkova velikanka) after Stanko Bloudek, which later gave rise to ski flying. The venue was completed in 1934. The first ski jump over 100 metres (330 ft) in history was achieved at the hill in 1936 by Sepp Bradl. At the time, it was the biggest jumping hill in the world.

In 1969, a new K185 hill, the Gorišek Brothers Flying Hill (Letalnica bratov Gorišek) was built by Vlado and Janez Gorišek. The FIS Nordic World Ski Championships 2023 were held in Planica.
