= Bakuriani =

Bakuriani ბაკურიანი
- Borough and Resort
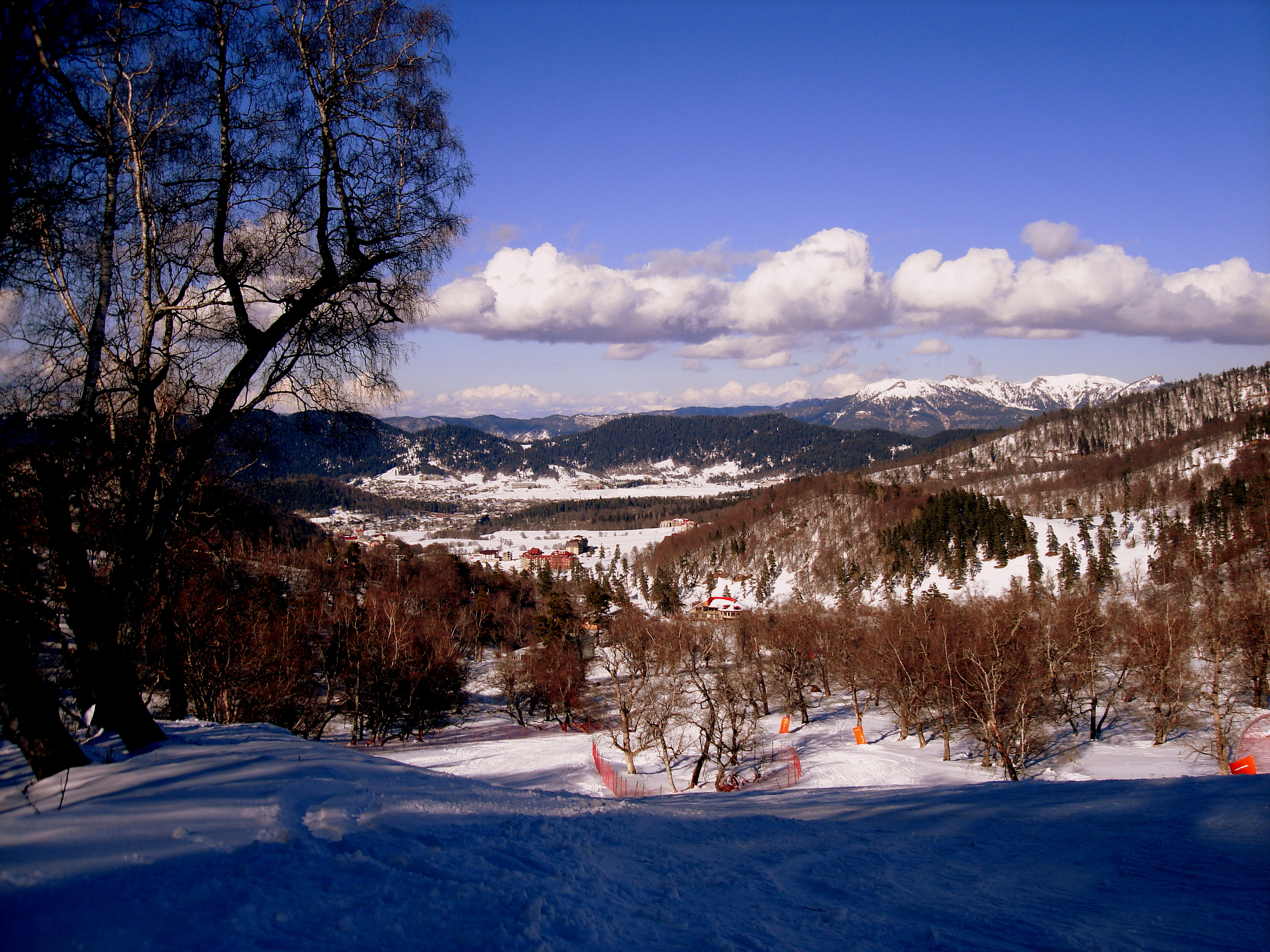

- Location in Georgia Bakuriani (Samtskhe-Javakheti)
- Coordinates: 41°45′N 43°32′E
- Country: Georgia
- Mkhare: Samtskhe-Javakheti
- Municipality: Borjomi
- Borough from: 1926
- Elevation: 1,700 m (5,600 ft)

Population (August 2025)
  - Total: 7,890
- Postal code: 1200
- Area code: +995 367

Bakuriani (Georgian: ბაკურიანი) is a daba and a ski resort in the Borjomi district of Georgia. It is located on the northern slope of the Trialeti Range, at an elevation of 1,700 meters (5,576 feet) above sea level.

== Geography ==
The region around Bakuriani is covered by coniferous forests (mainly made up of spruce). The resort lies 30 km (19 mi) from Borjomi and is located within the so-called Bakuriani Depression/caldera. The resort is connected with Borjomi by an electrified narrow-gauge railway. The present-day area of the town was built up by lava flows from the nearby Mukhera volcano.

== Winter sports ==
=== Ski resort ===
The ski area of the resort is split into two separate parts: Didveli and Kokhta/Kokhta-Mitarbi. Mount Kokhta provides a maximum skiable altitude of 2,269 metres (7,444 ft), whereas the highest lift in Didveli reaches 2,702 metres (8,865 ft).

The first ski base was opened in 1932. From Bakuriani to Kokhtagori Mountain (1.3 km [0.81 mi]) and Tskhratskaro Pass (3.5 km [2.2 mi]) there are ski lifts, ski tramps. There is artificial snowfall on Didveli skiing routes. Bakuriani is a year-round resort area, with highly developed health tourism. Due to the high demand, the number of accommodation and catering facilities has been increasing.

=== Sports competitions ===
In March 2022, Bakuriani was the host city for slopestyle during the 2021–22 FIS Snowboard World Cup, taking place in Georgia for the first time. In 2023, the Georgian Ski Association organized there the 2023 FIS Freestyle Ski and Snowboarding World Championships. In the following years, the resort also hosted various FIS World Cup events in Mogul Skiing and Ski/Snowbard Cross specialities.

== Climate ==
The climate of Bakuriani is transitional from humid maritime to relatively humid continental. (Köppen: Dfb) The winters are cold and experience significant snowfall while the summers are long and warm. Average annual temperature of the town is 4.3 °C (39.7 °F). The average temperature in January is −7.3 °C (18.9 °F) while the average August temperature is 15 °C (59 °F). The annual precipitation is 734 mm (28.9 in). The depth of snow from December to March is 64 cm (25.2 in). Bakuriani is also home to the Botanical Garden of the Georgian Academy of Sciences.

Climate data for Bakuriani (town centre)
Month	Jan	Feb	Mar	Apr	May	Jun	Jul	Aug	Sep	Oct	Nov	Dec	Year
Mean maximum °C (°F)	3 (37)	6 (43)	13 (55)	18 (64)	22 (72)	25 (77)	28 (82)	28 (82)	26 (79)	21 (70)	14 (57)	7 (45)	28 (82)
Mean daily maximum °C (°F)	−0.5 (31.1)	−0.2 (31.6)	3.7 (38.7)	9.3 (48.7)	14.6 (58.3)	17.8 (64.0)	20.6 (69.1)	20.8 (69.4)	17.5 (63.5)	12.9 (55.2)	6.2 (43.2)	1.3 (34.3)	10.3 (50.6)
Daily mean °C (°F)	−5.6 (21.9)	−5.3 (22.5)	−1.4 (29.5)	3.5 (38.3)	8.5 (47.3)	11.4 (52.5)	14.1 (57.4)	14.2 (57.6)	10.4 (50.7)	6.5 (43.7)	1.2 (34.2)	−3.3 (26.1)	4.5 (40.1)
Mean daily minimum °C (°F)	−10.7 (12.7)	−10.4 (13.3)	−6.4 (20.5)	−2.3 (27.9)	2.5 (36.5)	5 (41)	7.6 (45.7)	7.6 (45.7)	3.4 (38.1)	0.2 (32.4)	−3.8 (25.2)	−7.9 (17.8)	−1.3 (29.7)
Mean minimum °C (°F)	−18 (0)	−18 (0)	−15 (5)	−8 (18)	−2 (28)	2 (36)	6 (43)	6 (43)	0 (32)	−6 (21)	−13 (9)	−17 (1)	−18 (0)
Average precipitation mm (inches)	52.3 (2.06)	56.8 (2.24)	62.9 (2.48)	72.3 (2.85)	112.2 (4.42)	110.5 (4.35)	70.9 (2.79)	66.5 (2.62)	61.5 (2.42)	68.4 (2.69)	55.3 (2.18)	51.1 (2.01)	840.7 (33.11)
Average snowfall cm (inches)	30 (12)	23 (9.1)	29 (11)	14 (5.5)	0 (0)	0 (0)	0 (0)	0 (0)	0 (0)	7 (2.8)	20 (7.9)	26 (10)	149 (59)
Average precipitation days (≥ 0.01 in)	12.9	12.9	14.5	14.3	18.7	18.1	14.2	12.7	11.6	11.8	10.4	11.0	163.1
Average rainy days (≥ 5 mm)	0.2	1.0	4.7	9.5	17.5	13.0	10.9	9.1	10.3	10.2	2.4	0.4	89.2
Average snowy days (≥ 5 cm)	14.4	12.8	11.8	5.4	0.1	0	0	0	0	1.5	5.9	10.7	62.6
Mean daily sunshine hours	9.6	10.6	11.9	13.3	14.5	15.1	14.8	13.9	12.5	11.1	9.9	9.3	12.2
Percentage possible sunshine	48	48	49	44	49	67	88	91	82	57	52	50	60.4
Source 1: Climate averages (1981-2016) - Weather Spark
Source 2: Precipitation at 1665m ASL (1936-1992) - NOAA

== Infrastructure ==
The 37 km (23 mi) Borjomi-Bakuriani railway "Kukushka" uses 900 mm (2 ft 11 7/16 in) track gauge.

Preceding station	Georgian Railway	Following station
32 km towards Borjomi	Kukushka	Terminus

A few km south of Bakuriani lies the trajectory of the Baku–Tbilisi–Ceyhan pipeline.

== People ==
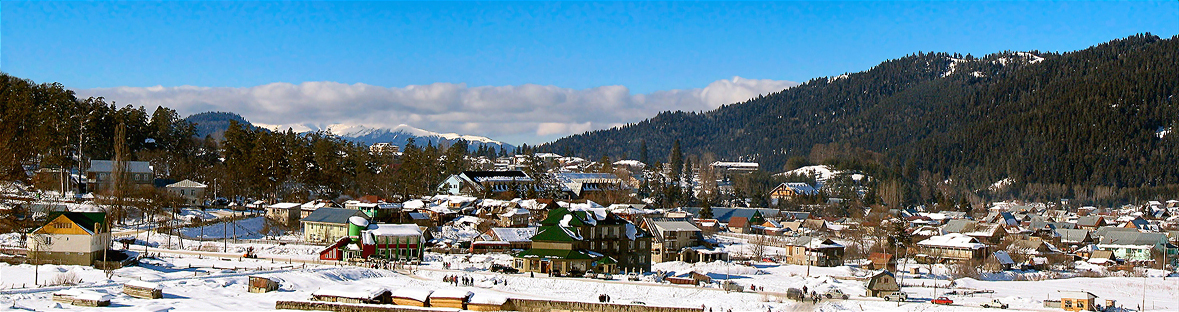
Bakuriani

It was the home town of luger Nodar Kumaritashvili, who died during event training on the first day of the 2010 Winter Olympics in Vancouver, British Columbia, Canada. He lived in Bakuriani for much of his life, and the street he lived on was named in his honor after his death. Georgia's flag-bearing athlete at the opening ceremony, alpine skier Iason Abramashvili, also resides there; he thought of withdrawing, but ultimately decided to compete to honor Kumaritashvili's memory.

== Gallery ==
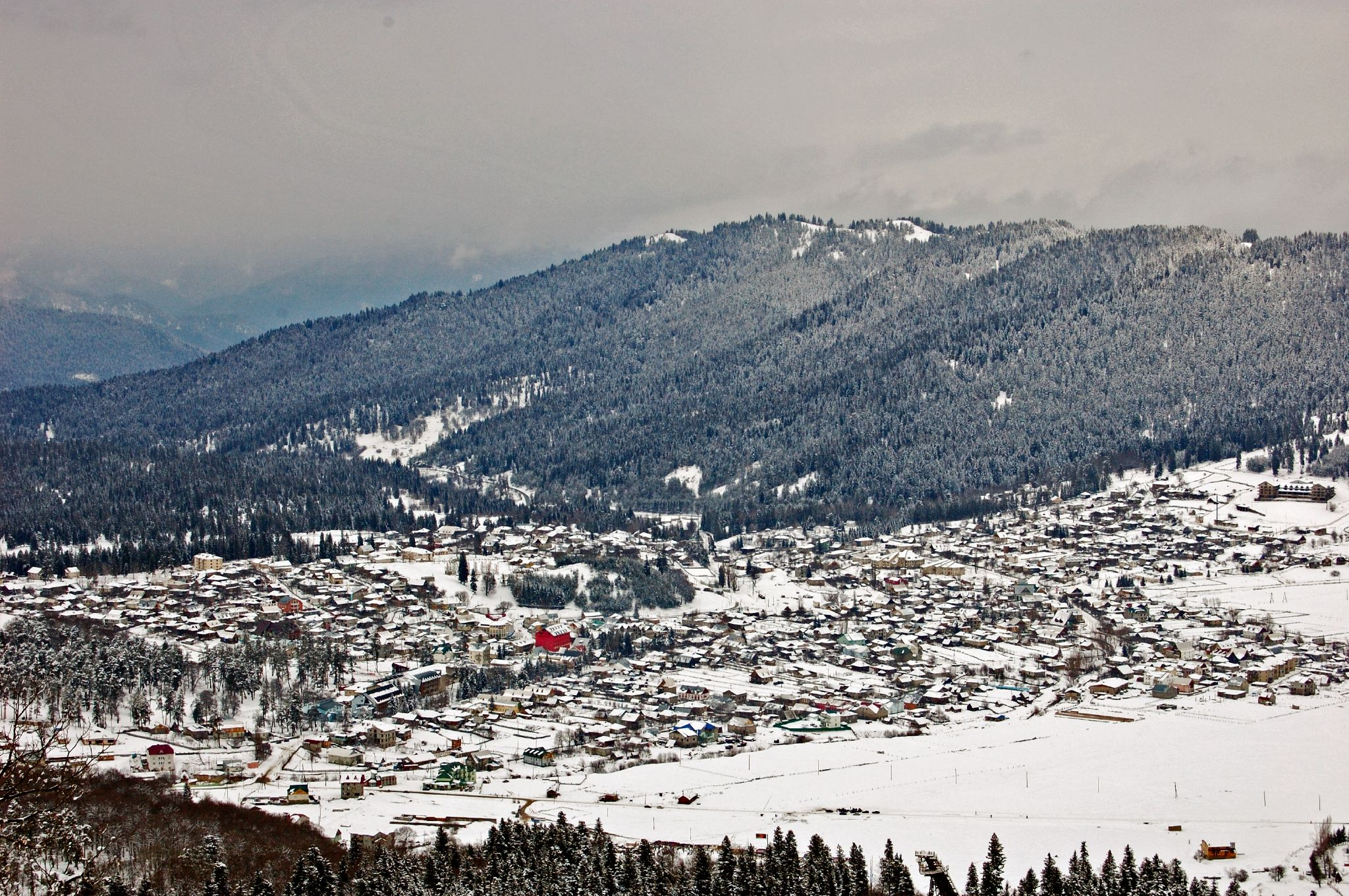
Bakuriani

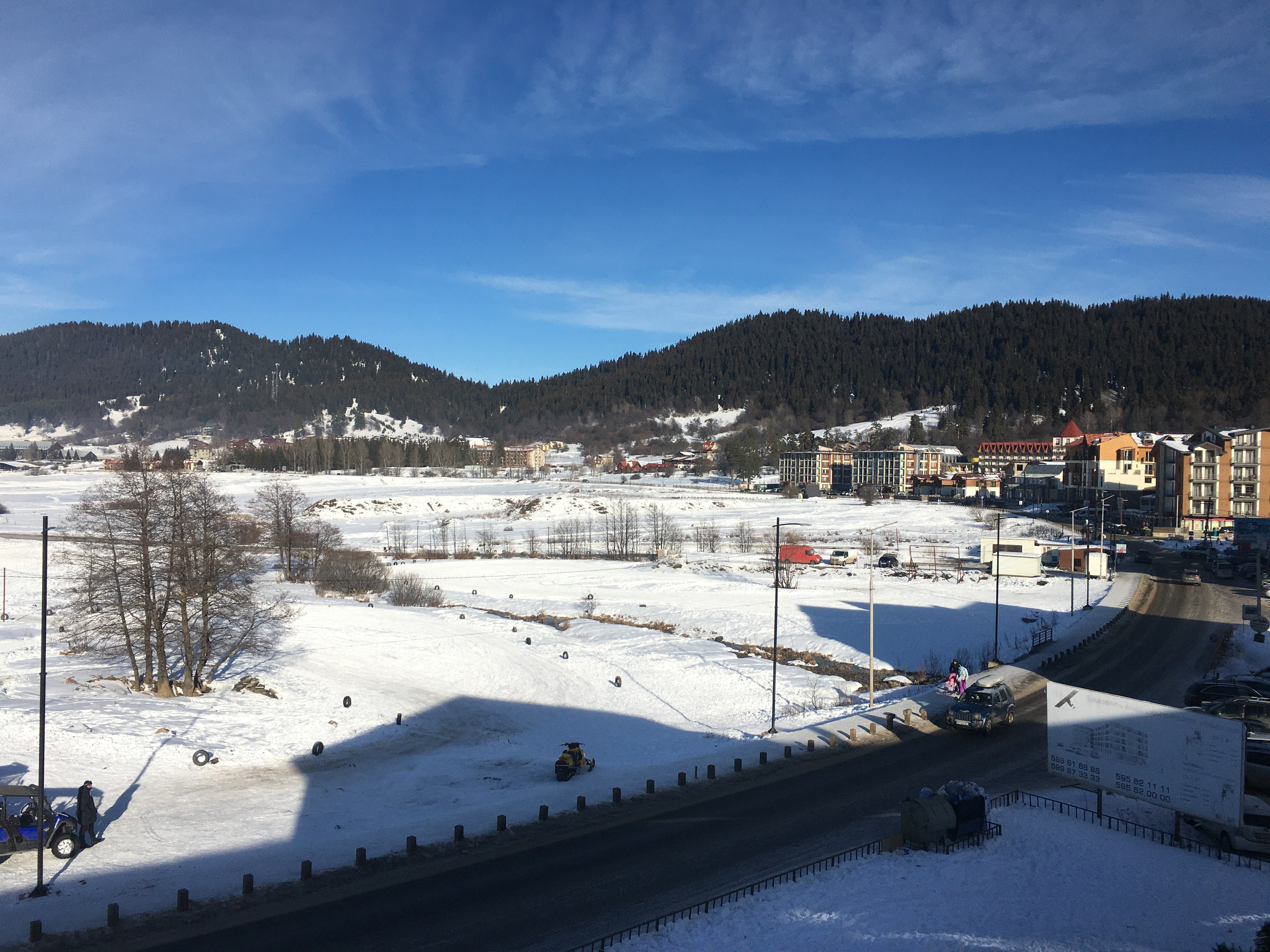
Bakuriani, January 2022

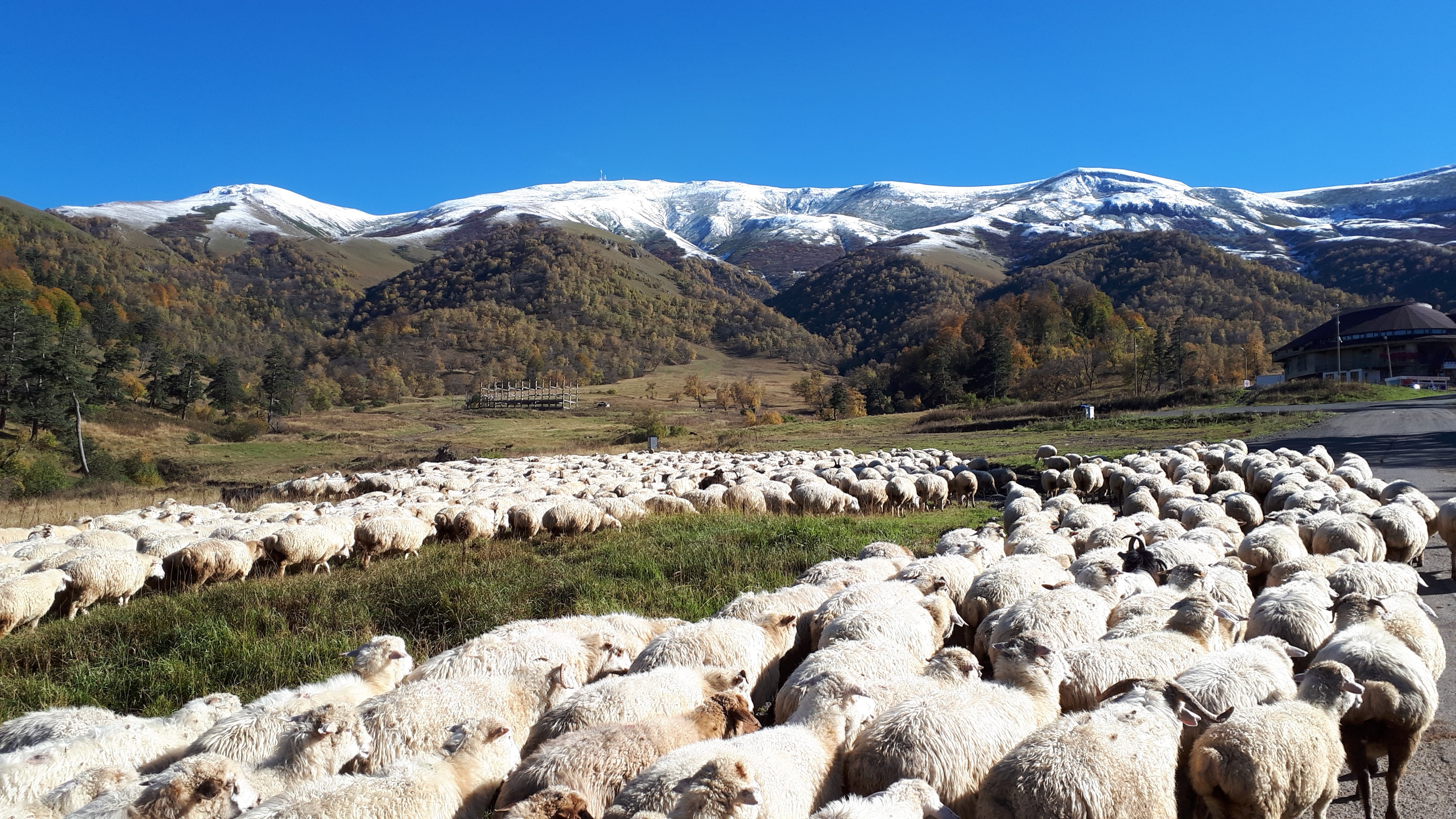
Flock of sheep in the Bakuriani recreation area, October 2018

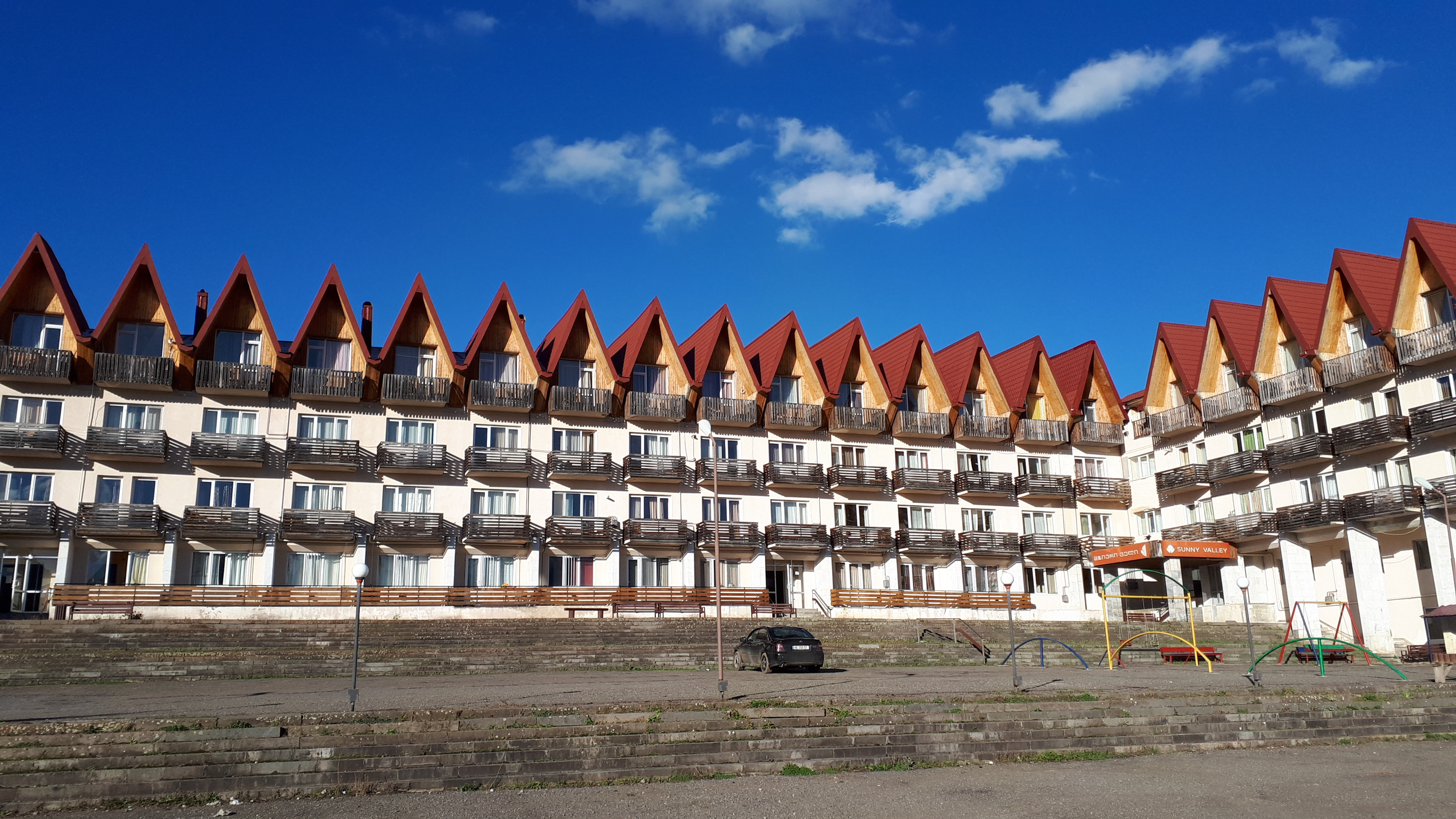
Bakuriani hotel complex, fall 2018

== See also ==
- List of ski areas and resorts in Asia
- List of ski areas and resorts in Europe
- Samtskhe-Javakheti
- Bakuriani K-115
