= Slovakia at the European Youth Olympic Festival =

- IOC code: SVK
- NOC: Slovak Olympic and Sports Committee
- Website: www.olympic.sk (in Slovak)
- Medals Ranked 26th: Gold 23 Silver 25 Bronze 42 Total 90

Other related appearances
- Czechoslovakia (1991)

Slovakia first participated at the European Youth Olympic Festival at the 1993 Summer Festival and has earned medals at both summer and winter festivals.

== Medal tables ==
=== Medals by Summer Youth Olympic Festival ===
Games	Athletes	Gold	Silver	Bronze	Total	Rank
(Belgium) 1991 Brussels	As part of Czechoslovakia (TCH)					
(Netherlands) 1993 Valkenswaard	15	1	1	1	3	20
(United Kingdom) 1995 Bath	31	2	1	3	5	13
(Portugal) 1997 Lisbon	39	2	0	0	2	17
(Denmark) 1999 Esbjerg	35	0	0	1	1	35
(Spain) 2001 Murcia	29	0	0	4	4	32
(France) 2003 Paris	38	2	0	1	3	17
(Italy) 2005 Lignano Sabbiadoro	49	0	0	3	3	36
(Serbia) 2007 Belgrade	54	1	4	3	8	17
(Finland) 2009 Tampere	49	2	1	1	4	19
(Turkey) 2011 Trabzon	53	0	0	1	1	33
(Netherlands) 2013 Utrecht	53	2	1	0	3	15
(Georgia (country)) 2015 Tbilisi	30	0	2	2	4	34
(Hungary) 2017 Győr	54	1	4	5	10	21
(Azerbaijan) 2019 Baku	45	0	0	1	1	36
(Slovakia) 2022 Banská Bystrica	149	2	1	3	6	21
(Slovenia) 2023 Maribor	48	2	0	3	5	21
(North Macedonia) 2025 Skopje	64	1	5	2	8	23
(Italy) 2027 Lignano Sabbiadoro	Future event					
(Belgium) 2029 Flanders	Future event					
(Latvia) 2031 Liepāja	Future event					
Total		18	20	34	72	27

=== Medals by Winter Youth Olympic Festival ===
Games	Athletes	Gold	Silver	Bronze	Total	Rank
(Italy) 1993 Aosta		0	0	1	1	16
1995 Andorra la Vella	13	0	0	0	0	–
(Sweden) 1997 Sundsvall	36	0	0	1	1	15
(Slovakia) 1999 Poprad-Tatry	58	1	0	0	1	10
(Finland) 2001 Vuokatti	39	0	0	0	0	–
(Slovenia) 2003 Bled	24	0	0	0	0	–
(Switzerland) 2005 Monthey	37	0	0	1	1	17
(Spain) 2007 Jaca	42	0	0	0	0	–
(Poland) 2009 Silesia	44	0	0	0	0	–
(Czech Republic) 2011 Liberec	50	0	0	1	1	14
(Romania) 2013 Braşov	32	0	0	0	0	–
(Austria) / 2015 Vorarlberg-Liechtenstein	47	0	0	0	0	–
(Turkey) 2017 Erzurum	40	0	0	1	1	16
(Bosnia and Herzegovina) 2019 Sarajevo-East Sarajevo	45	2	2	0	4	7
(Finland) 2022 Vuokatti	43	0	0	2	2	18
(Italy) 2023 Friuli-Venezia Giulia	76	0	2	0	2	20
(Georgia (country)) 2025 Bakuriani	62	2	1	1	4	7
(Romania) 2027 Braşov	Future events					
Total		5	5	8	18	18

=== Medals by summer sport ===
Sport	Gold	Silver	Bronze	Total
Athletics	6	4	8	18
Tennis	5	1	3	9
Judo	2	2	7	11
Basketball	2	0	1	3
Canoeing	1	4	3	8
Swimming	1	2	5	8
Cycling	1	1	3	5
Table tennis	0	2	2	4
Artistic gymnastics	0	2	1	3
Handball	0	1	1	2
Totals (10 entries)	18	19	34	71

=== Medals by winter sport ===
Sport	Gold	Silver	Bronze	Total
Biathlon	3	1	2	6
Short track speed skating	2	2	1	5
Ice hockey	0	2	2	4
Cross-country skiing	0	0	2	2
Figure skating	0	0	1	1
Totals (5 entries)	5	5	8	18

== List of medalists ==
=== Summer Festivals ===
Medal	Name	Games	Sport	Event
Gold	Tomáš Halva	(Netherlands) 1993 Valkenswaard	Athletics	Boys' javelin throw
Silver	Barbora Zahnová	(Netherlands) 1993 Valkenswaard	Tennis	Girls' singles
Bronze	Barbora Zahnová; Dominik Hrbatý	(Netherlands) 1993 Valkenswaard	Tennis	Mixed doubles
Gold	Boris Vazovan	(United Kingdom) 1995 Bath	Athletics	Boys' 400 m hurdles
Gold	Miriam Bobková	(United Kingdom) 1995 Bath	Athletics	Girls' 100 m hurdles
Silver	Miriam Mašeková	(United Kingdom) 1995 Bath	Athletics	Girls' 800 m
Bronze	Girls' handball team	(United Kingdom) 1995 Bath	Handball	Girls' tournament
Bronze	Viktor Jurák	(United Kingdom) 1995 Bath	Swimming	Boys' 100 m butterfly
Bronze	Viktor Jurák	(United Kingdom) 1995 Bath	Swimming	Boys' 200 m butterfly
Gold	Girls' basketball team	(Portugal) 1997 Lisbon	Basketball	Girls' tournament
Gold	Júlia Svobodová	(Portugal) 1997 Lisbon	Swimming	Girls' 100 m backstroke
Bronze	Matej Jurčo	(Denmark) 1999 Esbjerg	Cycling	Boys' road race
Bronze	Girls' basketball team	(Spain) 2001 Murcia	Basketball	Girls' tournament
Bronze	Tamara Kopecká	(Spain) 2001 Murcia	Athletics	Girls' 400 m
Bronze	Jozef Pelikán	(Spain) 2001 Murcia	Athletics	Boys' 800 m
Bronze	Ján Majdán	(Spain) 2001 Murcia	Judo	Boys' 66 kg
Gold	Girls' basketball team	(France) 2003 Paris	Basketball	Girls' tournament
Gold	Jozef Repčík	(France) 2003 Paris	Athletics	Boys' 800 m
Bronze	Michaela Margócziová	(France) 2003 Paris	Athletics	Girls' discus throw
Bronze	Katarína Čarná	(Italy) 2005 Lignano Sabbiadoro	Judo	Girls' 63 kg
Bronze	Klaudia Boczová	(Italy) 2005 Lignano Sabbiadoro	Tennis	Girls' singles
Bronze	Klaudia Boczová; Andrej Martin	(Italy) 2005 Lignano Sabbiadoro	Tennis	Mixed doubles
Gold	Alexandra Štuková	(Serbia) 2007 Belgrade	Athletics	Girls' 400 m
Silver	Roman Turčáni	(Serbia) 2007 Belgrade	Athletics	Boys' 400 m
Silver	Katarína Listopadová	(Serbia) 2007 Belgrade	Swimming	Girls' 200 m individual medley
Silver	Barbora Balážová	(Serbia) 2007 Belgrade	Table tennis	Girls' singles
Silver	Barbora Balážová; Alžbeta Danová	(Serbia) 2007 Belgrade	Table tennis	Girls' doubles
Bronze	Dana Čížková	(Serbia) 2007 Belgrade	Athletics	Girls' pole vault
Bronze	Jakub Figeľ; Alžbeta Danová	(Serbia) 2007 Belgrade	Table tennis	Mixed doubles
Bronze	Jakub Figeľ; Dávid Karas	(Serbia) 2007 Belgrade	Table tennis	Boys' doubles
Gold	Tomáš Kružliak	(Finland) 2009 Tampere	Athletics	Boys' hammer throw
Gold	Arpád Szakács	(Finland) 2009 Tampere	Judo	Boys' 81 kg
Silver	Girls' handball team	(Finland) 2009 Tampere	Handball	Girls' tournament
Bronze	Andrea Krišandová	(Finland) 2009 Tampere	Judo	Girls' 52 kg
Bronze	Dávid Zverko	(Turkey) 2011 Trabzon	Cycling	Boys' road race
Gold	Viktória Kužmová	(Netherlands) 2013 Utrecht	Tennis	Girls' singles
Gold	Viktória Kužmová; Tereza Mihalíková	(Netherlands) 2013 Utrecht	Tennis	Girls' doubles
Silver	Michaela Pešková	(Netherlands) 2013 Utrecht	Athletics	Girls' 400 m hurdles
Silver	Miroslav Kopiš	(Georgia (country)) 2015 Tbilisi	Judo	Boys' 81 kg
Silver	Matúš Stoček	(Georgia (country)) 2015 Tbilisi	Cycling	Boys' road race
Bronze	Dominika Kincelová	(Georgia (country)) 2015 Tbilisi	Judo	Girls' 44 kg
Bronze	Adrián Baran; Jakub Benda; Simon Rigász; Marcel Žilavý	(Georgia (country)) 2015 Tbilisi	Athletics	Boys' 4 x 100 m relay
Gold	Lucia Valová; Eduard Strýček	(Hungary) 2017 Győr	Canoeing	Mixed C2 200 m
Silver	Lucia Valová	(Hungary) 2017 Győr	Canoeing	Girls' C1 200 m
Silver	Lucia Valová	(Hungary) 2017 Győr	Canoeing	Girls' C1 500 m
Silver	Romana Jakubisková; Karolína Seregiová; Martin Hvojník; Richard Németh	(Hungary) 2017 Győr	Canoeing	Mixed K4 500 m
Silver	Denis Turac	(Hungary) 2017 Győr	Judo	Boys' 90 kg
Bronze	Martin Hvojník; Richard Németh	(Hungary) 2017 Győr	Canoeing	Boys' K2 200 m
Bronze	Martin Hvojník; Richard Németh	(Hungary) 2017 Győr	Canoeing	Boys' K2 500 m
Bronze	Martin Hvojník	(Hungary) 2017 Győr	Canoeing	Boys' K1 200 m
Bronze	Andrej Paulíny	(Hungary) 2017 Győr	Athletics	Boys' 1 500 m
Bronze	Nina Geršiová	(Hungary) 2017 Győr	Judo	Girls' 70 kg
Bronze	Martin Svrček	(Azerbaijan) 2019 Baku	Cycling	Boys road race
Gold	Renáta Jamrichová	(Slovakia) 2022 Banská Bystrica	Tennis	Girls' singles
Gold	Renáta Jamrichová; Daniel Balaščák	(Slovakia) 2022 Banská Bystrica	Tennis	Mixed doubles
Silver	Lenka Gymerská	(Slovakia) 2022 Banská Bystrica	Athletics	Girls' 400 m
Bronze	Samuel Košťál	(Slovakia) 2022 Banská Bystrica	Swimming	Boys 200 m butterfly
Bronze	Samuel Košťál	(Slovakia) 2022 Banská Bystrica	Swimming	Boys 400 m individual medley
Bronze	Anna Šimková	(Slovakia) 2022 Banská Bystrica	Athletics	Girls' Pole vault
Gold	Patrícia Tománková	(Slovenia) 2023 Maribor	Judo	Girls' 40 kg
Gold	Mia Pohánková; Soňa Depešová	(Slovenia) 2023 Maribor	Tennis	Girls' doubles
Bronze	Kristína Lili Krížová	(Slovenia) 2023 Maribor	Judo	Girls' 44 kg
Bronze	Nina Filkorová	(Slovenia) 2023 Maribor	Judo	Girls' +70 kg
Bronze	Stela Megelová	(Slovenia) 2023 Maribor	Swimming	Girls' 200 m individual medley
Gold	Karolína Hajduková	(North Macedonia) 2025 Skopje	Cycling	Girls' Individual time trial
Silver	Filip Gero	(North Macedonia) 2025 Skopje	Swimming	Boy's 400 m freestyle
Silver	Filip Gero	(North Macedonia) 2025 Skopje	Swimming	Boy's 400 m individual medley
Silver	Lucia Piliarová; Nela Ostrihoňová; Lilly Murínová	(North Macedonia) 2025 Skopje	Artistic gymnastics	Girls' Team all-around
Silver	Lucia Piliarová	(North Macedonia) 2025 Skopje	Artistic gymnastics	Girls' Individual all-around
Silver	Zara Záhorská	(North Macedonia) 2025 Skopje	Canoe slalom	Girls' Slalom K-1
Bronze	Nina Hejčíková	(North Macedonia) 2025 Skopje	Athletics	Girls' 100 m hurdles
Bronze	Nela Ostrihoňová	(North Macedonia) 2025 Skopje	Artistic gymnastics	Girls' Balance beam

=== Winter Festivals ===
Medal	Name	Games	Sport	Event
Bronze	Martin Bajčičák	(Italy) 1993 Aosta	Cross-country skiing	Boys' 7,5 km
Bronze	Roman Reguly; Marcel Timko; Zuzana Háazová; Katarína Valenčinová	(Sweden) 1997 Sundsvall	Biathlon	Mixed 5,2 km relay
Gold	Dušan Šimočko; Matej Kazár; Zuzana Hasillová; Petra Slezáková	(Slovakia) 1999 Poprad-Tatry	Biathlon	Mixed 4 x 5 km relay
Bronze	Martin Otčenáš; František Janečko; Katarína Garajová; Barbara Blašková	(Switzerland) 2005 Monthey	Cross-country skiing	Mixed 4 x 5 km relay
Bronze	Monika Simančíková	(Czech Republic) 2011 Liberec	Figure skating	Girls'
Bronze	Boys' ice hockey team: Oliver Minko Kristián Kováčik Adam Paulíny Matej Ilenčík Martin Vitáloš Peter Melicher Adam Kobolka Oliver Okuliar Alexander Hvizdoš Matej Bátory Ivan Hryzák Robert Dzugaň Oliver Turan Sebastián Hudec Alexander Zekucia Marcel Dlugoš Ján Sarvas Martin Faško-Rudáš Dominik Seliga Michal Vojvoda	(Turkey) 2017 Erzurum	Ice hockey	Boys' tournament
Gold	Petra Rusnáková	(Bosnia and Herzegovina) 2019 Sarajevo-East Sarajevo	Short track speed skating	Girls' 500 m
Gold	Petra Rusnáková	(Bosnia and Herzegovina) 2019 Sarajevo-East Sarajevo	Short track speed skating	Girls' 1000 m
Silver	Petra Rusnáková	(Bosnia and Herzegovina) 2019 Sarajevo-East Sarajevo	Short track speed skating	Girls' 1500 m
Silver	Lucia Filipová	(Bosnia and Herzegovina) 2019 Sarajevo-East Sarajevo	Short track speed skating	Girls' 500 m
Bronze	Tamara Tokárová	(Finland) 2022 Vuokatti	Short track speed skating	Girls' 500 m
Bronze	Jakub Borguľa	(Finland) 2022 Vuokatti	Biathlon	Boys' 12.5 km individual
Silver	Michal Adamov	(Italy) 2023 Friuli-Venezia Giulia	Biathlon	Boys' 12.5 km individual
Silver	Girls' ice hockey team: Vanessa Eibenová; Michaela Feníková; Alica Juríková; Lenka Karkošková; Nikola Komloš; Tatiana Korčeková; Bianka Kostková; Nikita Krištofíková; Ema Lacková; Nela Lopušanová; Bianka Masláková; Lívia Nogová; Zuzana Sliacka; Mariana Sumegová; Alexandra Tomasová; Liana Tomaštíková; Zuzana Tomečková; Erna Tóthová; Laura Turňová; Jazmína Večerková	(Italy) 2023 Friuli-Venezia Giulia	Ice hockey	Girls' tournament
Gold	Michaela Straková	(Georgia (country)) 2025 Bakuriani	Biathlon	Girls' 10 km individual
Gold	Michaela Straková	(Georgia (country)) 2025 Bakuriani	Biathlon	Girls' 6 km sprint
Silver	Boys' ice hockey team: Matej Bereš; Oliver Botka; Denis Čelko; Roderik Černák; Ján Čurlej; Juraj Jonas Ďurčo; Jakub Husár; Samuel Hybský; Filip Kovalčík; Kristián Macák; Ivan Matta; Adam Obušek; Marko Požgay; Kristián Rezničák; Matej Stankoven; Jakub Syrný; Maxim Šimko; Tomáš Šromovský; Denis Tóth; Matúš Válek	(Georgia (country)) 2025 Bakuriani	Ice hockey	Boys' tournament
Bronze	Girls' ice hockey team: Nina Čellárová; Natália Gerő; Sofia Hajnalová; Alexandra Hirjaková; Karin Hrušková; Gréta Konrádová; Michaela Letaši; Laura Lilly Lipnická; Lucia Luptáková; Dominika Miškovičová; Emma Plvanová; Aurélia Račák; Nina Roštecká; Nina Rybovičová; Sofia Sklenková; Sofia Stráňovská; Nina Ševčíková; Nina Šimová; Daniela Šufliarská; Nela Tischlerová	(Georgia (country)) 2025 Bakuriani	Ice hockey	Girls' tournament

== See also ==
- Slovakia at the Youth Olympics
- Slovakia at the Olympics
- Slovakia at the Paralympics
- Slovakia at the European Games
- Slovakia at the Universiade
- Slovakia at the World Games
