= Priscilla Ernst =

Dutch speed skater (born 1971)

Personal information
- Nationality: Dutch
- Born: 7 September 1971 (age 54) The Hague, Netherlands

Sport
- Sport: Short track speed skating

Priscilla Ernst (born 7 September 1971) is a Dutch short track speed skater. She competed at the 1992 Winter Olympics and the 1994 Winter Olympics. Her career was cut short in 1995 when she fell and fractured two vertebra. Ernst is the mother of Zoë Deltrap.
