= Konrad Badacz =

Polish biathlete (born 2003)

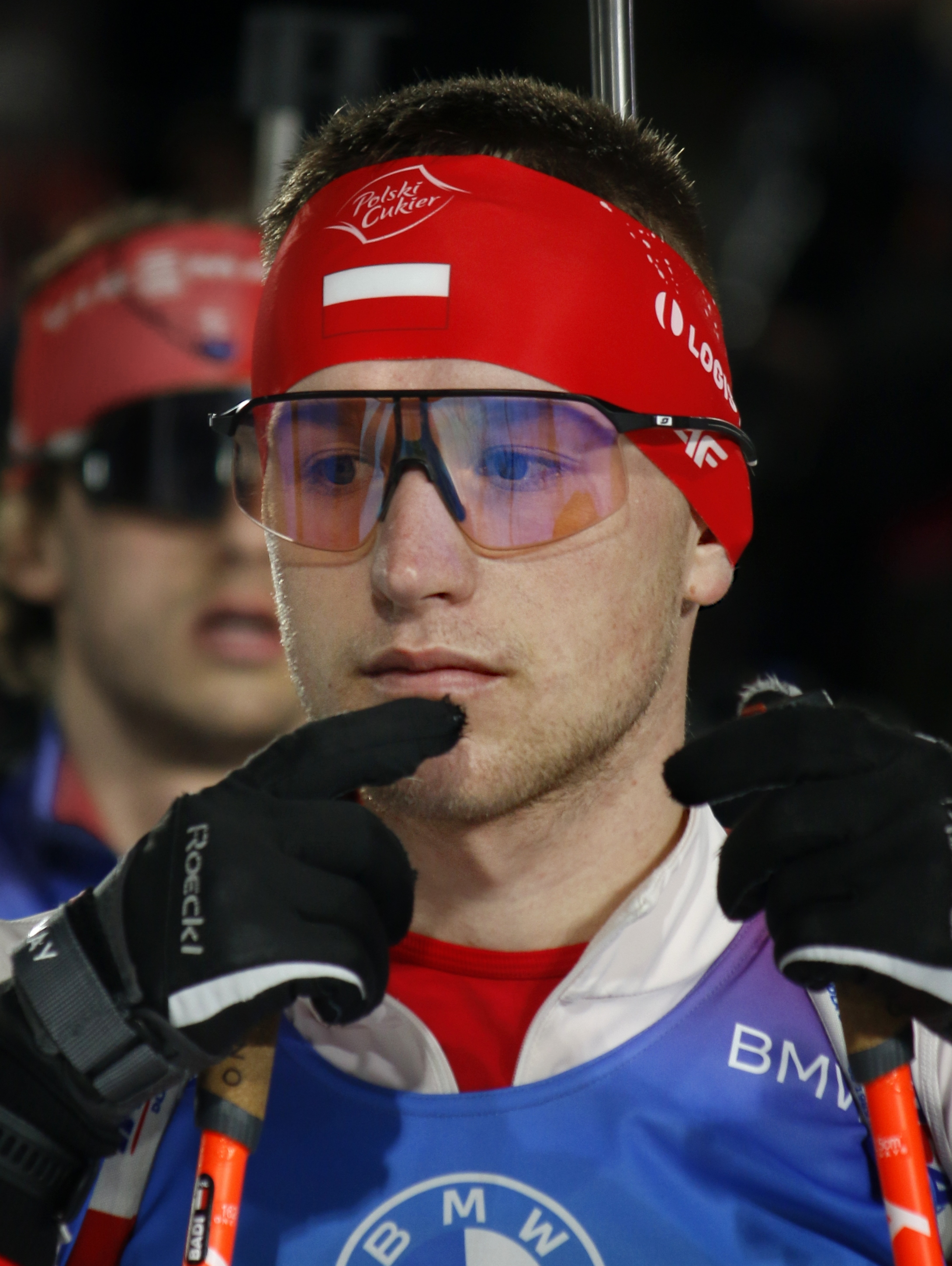
- Badacz in 2024

Personal information
- Nationality: Polish
- Born: 16 January 2003 (age 23) Piechowice, Poland

Sport
- Country: Poland
- Sport: Biathlon
Medal record
Men's biathlon
Representing Poland
Junior World Championships
Bronze medal – third place	2025 Östersund	4 × 7.5 km relay
Youth World Championships
Gold medal – first place	2021 Obertilliach	3 × 7.5 km relay

Konrad Badacz (born 16 January 2003) is a Polish biathlete. He made his debut in the Biathlon World Cup in 2023.

== Career ==
Konrad Badacz gained international experience at the 2020 Youth Olympic Games in Lausanne but missed out on top-10 finishes due to shooting errors. He later participated in the 2020 Youth World Championships, achieving a sixth-place finish in the relay event. In January 2021, he made his debut in the IBU Cup but achieved only lower placements. By the end of the season, he won a gold medal in the relay event at the 2021 Youth World Championships with teammates Jan Guńka and Marcin Zawół. In the winter of 2021/22, Badacz competed in the IBU Junior Cup, winning a race with the men's relay team in Martell. In the 2022 Youth World Championships, he narrowly missed a medal, finishing fourth in the sprint, but secured a silver medal at the 2022 Youth Olympic Festival in the sprint event. In the winter of 2022/23, Badacz had a successful season, winning two races in the IBU Junior Cup and achieving top-30 results in the IBU Cup, including a 15th place in the sprint in Osrblie. He also participated in the 2023 European Championships, finishing 71st in the sprint. At the 2023 Junior European Championships, he won a bronze medal in the sprint, and at the Junior World Championships, he finished 11th in both the sprint and pursuit events.

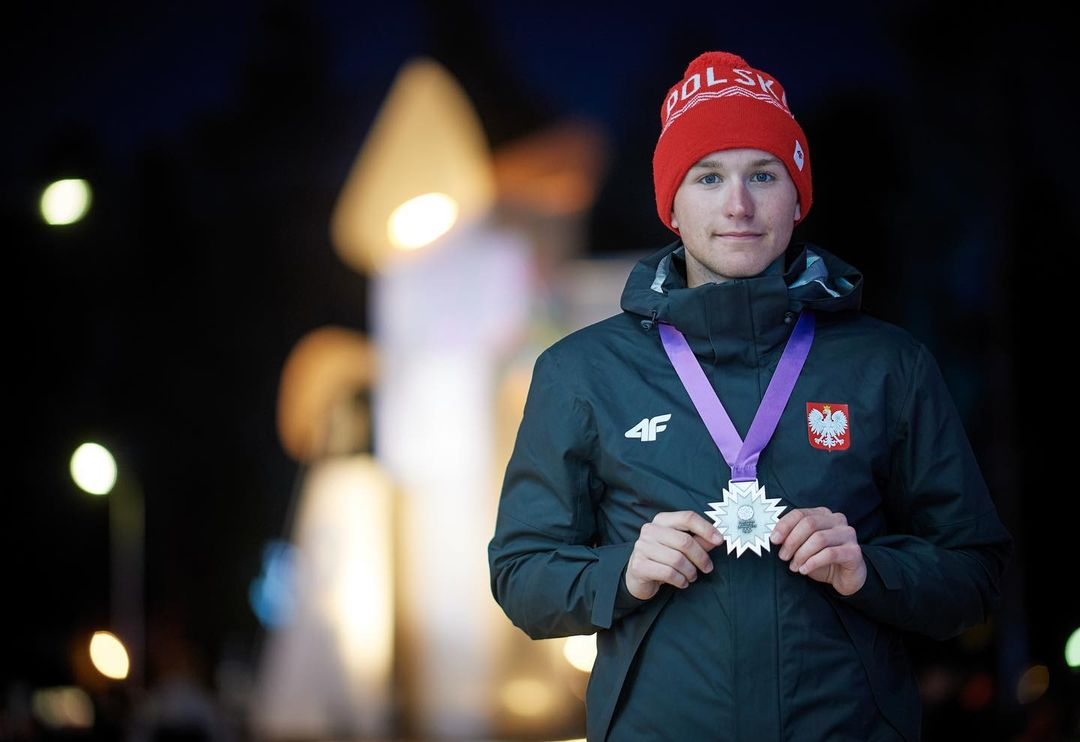
Konrad Badacz with silver medal EYOF 2022

In the early winter of 2023/24, Badacz made his World Cup debut in Östersund. After several placements outside the top 60, he improved significantly in the sprint event in Oberhof, finishing 35th and earning his first World Cup points. He achieved his best result in a relay event with a 15th-place finish at the same location.

== Biathlon results ==
All results are sourced from the International Biathlon Union.

=== Olympic Games ===
0 medal

Event	Individual	Sprint	Pursuit	Mass start	Relay	Mixed relay
(Italy) 2026 Milano Cortina	49th	57th	43rd	—	11th	9th

=== World Championships ===
Event	Individual	Sprint	Pursuit	Mass start	Relay	Mixed relay	Single mixed relay
(Czech Republic) 2024 Nové Město	42nd	40th	31st	—	9th	—	—
(Switzerland) 2025 Lenzerheide	30th	48th	37th	—	16th	14th	—

=== World Cup ===
Season	Overall			Individual		Sprint		Pursuit		Mass start	
Season	Races	Points	Position	Points	Position	Points	Position	Points	Position	Points	Position
2023–24	11/21	10	77th	—	—	—	—	10	61st	—	—

=== Youth and Junior World Championships ===
2 medals (1 gold, 1 bronze)

Year	Age	Individual	Sprint	Pursuit	Mass Start	Relay
(Switzerland) 2020 Lenzerheide	17	37th	43rd	37th	N/A	6th
(Austria) 2021 Obertilliach	18	52nd	15th	27th	N/A	Gold
(United States) 2022 Soldier Hollow	19	7th	4th	5th	N/A	6th
(Kazakhstan) 2023 Shchuchinsk	20	47th	11th	11th	N/A	5th
(Estonia) 2024 Otepää	21	7th	7th	N/A	5th	6th
(Sweden) 2025 Östersund	22	44th	30th	N/A	15th	Bronze
