= Basketball at the 2015 European Youth Summer Olympic Festival =

Basketball at the 2015 European Youth Summer Olympic Festival

== Medal summary ==
=== Medal table ===
Rank	Nation	Gold	Silver	Bronze	Total
1	Bosnia and Herzegovina (BIH)	1	0	0	1
1	Czech Republic (CZE)	1	0	0	1
3	Belgium (BEL)	0	1	0	1
3	Spain (ESP)	0	1	0	1
5	Germany (GER)	0	0	1	1
5	Hungary (HUN)	0	0	1	1
Totals (6 entries)		2	2	2	6

=== Medalist events ===
Event	Gold	Silver	Bronze
Boys	Bosnia and Herzegovina	Spain	Germany
Girls	Czech Republic	Belgium	Hungary
