= Athletics at the 1995 European Youth Summer Olympic Days =

The athletics competition at the 1995 European Youth Summer Olympic Days was held from 10 to 13 July. The events took place at the University of Bath, United Kingdom. Boys and girls born 1978 or 1979 or later participated 27 track and field events, divided equally between the sexes with the exception of 3000 metres, 2000 metres steeplechase and pole vault for boys but not girls.

== Medal summary ==
=== Men ===
Event	Gold		Silver		Bronze	
100 metres	Dwain Chambers (GBR)	10.87	Georgios Skender (CYP)	11.01	Fredrik Eklund (SWE)	11.18
200 metres	Uvie Ugono (GBR)	21.94	Fredrik Eklund (SWE)	22.16	Aleksandr Dobryanskiy (RUS)	22.32
400 metres	Adrián Fernández (ESP)	48.13	Periklis Iakovakis (GRE)	48.57	David Marinic (SLO)	49.01
800 metres	Gert-Jan Liefers (NED)	1:49.37	Juan Villarino (ESP)	1:53.02	Aleksandr Trutko (BLR)	1:53.10
1500 metres	Grzegorz Kujawski (POL)	4:02.51	Gareth Turnbull (IRL)	4:03.11	Panormitis Kourmadias (GRE)	4:03.29
3000 metres	Iván Hierro (ESP)	8:30.01	Günther Weidlinger (AUT)	8:30.93	Grzegorz Kujawski (POL)	8:31.06
110 metres hurdles	Tomasz Ścigaczewski (POL)	13.67	Ionuț Pungă (ROU)	14.06	Ben Warmington (GBR)	14.16
400 metres hurdles	Boris Vazovan (SVK)	51.87	Mark Rowlands (GBR)	52.63	Boris Gorban (RUS)	52.92
2000 metres steeplechase	Mindaugas Pukštas (LTU)	5:56.64	Meelis Tammre (EST)	5:59.04	Ionut Blidaru (ROU)	5:59.10
4 × 100 m relay	Great Britain (GBR); Dwain Chambers; Mark Findlay; Uvie Ugono; Nathan Morgan	40.68	Spain (ESP); Raúl Fernández; David Canal; Adrián Fernández; Orkatz Beitia	41.73	Netherlands (NED); Erwin Simpelaar; Martin Luinge; Edwin van Calker; Martijn Ungerer	41.89
High jump	Andrey Krasulya (UKR)	2.14 m	Ben Challenger (GBR)	2.11 m	Adi Mordel (ISR)	2.08 m
Pole vault	Viktor von Bothmer (SWE)	5.10 m	Sebastien Leydier (FRA)	5.00 m	Maksim Rudenko (UKR)	4.80 m
Long jump	Petar Dachev (BUL)	7.43 m w	Yann Doménech (FRA)	7.33 m w	Martin Luinge (NED)	7.31 m w
Shot put	Iker Sukía (ESP)	20.13 m	Váios Tíngas (GRE)	19.29 m	Erwin Simpelaar (NED)	19.24 m
Discus throw	Emeka Udechuku (GBR)	59.96 m	Luca Gaido (ITA)	55.80 m	Mario Pestano (ESP)	55.72 m
Javelin throw	Juha Aarnio (FIN)	66.84 m	Sebastijan Grošek (SLO)	64.92 m	Andis Anskins (LAT)	62.14 m

=== Women ===
Event	Gold		Silver		Bronze	
100 metres	Kim Gevaert (BEL)	11.96	Rebecca Drummond (GBR)	12.07	Lynda Nana (FRA)	12.13
200 metres	Agnė Visockaitė (LTU)	24.21	Lesley Owusu (GBR)	24.82	Enikő Szabó (HUN)	24.95
400 metres	Cindy Ega (FRA)	54.28	Sylvie-Anne Elschout (BEL)	54.98	Andrea Grof (HUN)	55.16
800 metres	Natalya Yevdokimova (UKR)	2:05.72	Miriam Maseková (SVK)	2:06.43	Irina Somesan (ROU)	2:06.42
1500 metres	Cristina Tudor (ROU)	4:25.43	Maria Lynch (IRL)	4:27.34	Katalin Szentgyörgyi (HUN)	4:27.44
100 metres hurdles	Miriam Bobková (SVK)	14.37	Éva Miklós (ROU)	14.53	Grainne Redmond (IRL)	14.56
400 metres hurdles	Medina Tudor (ROU)	59.80	Yuliya Nosova (RUS)	61.16	Fani Chalkia (GRE)	62.37
4 × 100 m relay	France (FRA); Cynthia Octavia; Lynda Nana; Reïna-Flor Okori; Cindy Ega	46.35	Great Britain (GBR); Michelle Dunkley; Lesley Owusu; Lucy Chaffe; Rebecca Drummond	46.77	Russia (RUS); Svetlana Rotova; Anna Potapchenko; Yelena Semenova; Mariya Kapitonova	47.20
High jump	Svetlana Lapina (RUS)	1.89 m	Dóra Győrffy (HUN)	1.86 m	Michelle Dunkley (GBR) Barbara Berden (SLO)	1.83
Long jump	Reïna-Flor Okori (FRA)	6.26 m w	Yelena Kaledina (RUS)	6.17 m w	Vanessa Peñalver (ESP)	6.10 m w
Shot put	Yelena Ivanenko (BLR)	15.19 m	Anca Vîlceanu (ROU)	14.37 m	Philippa Roles (GBR)	13.66 m
Discus throw	Lacramioara Ionescu (ROU)	49.34 m	Christelle Bornil (FRA)	45.58 m	Olga Taranaeva (RUS)	43.04 m
Javelin throw	Nikolett Szabó (HUN)	54.80 m	Loredana Trohin (ROU)	51.58 m	Anette Skistad (NOR)	49.80 m
