= Swimming at the 1995 European Youth Summer Olympic Days =

Swimming at the 1995 European Youth Summer Olympic Days was held at the University of Bath, England.

== Medal summary ==
=== Events ===
==== Boys' events ====
Games	Gold		Silver		Bronze	
Freestyle
100 m freestyle	Kevin Anderson; Great Britain	53.07	Stepan Ganzei; Russia	53.49	Iouri Mikittchouk; Belarus	53.80
200 m freestyle	Tomer Shtsnger; Israel	1:55.56	Stepan Ganzei; Russia	1:56.78	Anders Bo Pederson; Denmark	1:56.89
400 m freestyle	Anatoli Poliakov; Russia	4:04.85	Tomer Shtsnger; Israel	4:05.23	Lica-Ciprian Amariei; Romania	4:05.43
Backstroke
100 m backstroke	Kevin Anderson; Great Britain	59.34	Blaz Medvesek; Slovenia	59.53	Daniel Vago; Hungary	1:00.28
200 m backstroke	Yoav Gath; Israel	2:07.65	Blaz Medvesek; Slovenia	2:07.76	Marco Bellino; Italy	2:08.03
Breastroke
100 m breaststroke	Remo Lutolf; Switzerland	1:05.32	Maurizio Capone; Italy	1:06.59	Alexei Slobodyanyuk; Ukraine	1:06.73
200 m breaststroke	Suha Akman; Turkey	2:21.88	Tom McLean; Great Britain	2:23.71	Olivier Lamolinerie; France	2: 26.59
Butterfly
100 m butterfly	Nimrod Palma; Israel	57.93	Dmitri Mohnachev; Russia	57.99	Viktor Jurak; Slovakia	58.66
200 m butterfly	Nimrod Palma; Israel	2:07.66	Andraz Valcl; Slovenia	2:10.45	Viktor Jurak; Slovakia	2:11.45
Medley
200 m individual medley	Darren Wigg; Great Britain	2:09.81	Nicola Saddem; Italy	2:10.71	Bassili Kapytkov; Belarus	2:10.84
Relays
4 × 100 m freestyle relay	Russia		Belgium		Great Britain	
4 × 100 m medley relay	Russia		Great Britain		Italy	

==== Girls' events ====
Games	Gold		Silver		Bronze	
Freestyle
100 m freestyle	Melanie Marshall; Great Britain	58.69	Chantal Groot; Netherlands	1:00.23	Nadya Beshevli; Ukraine	1:00.64
200 m freestyle	Gemma Hindson; Great Britain	2:08.60	Chantal Lamet; Netherlands	2:09.20	MaMar Brunet; Spain	2:09.35
400 m freestyle	Jennifer Hunter; Great Britain	4:27.76	Lilija Ziatdinova; Russia	4:34.54	Chantal Lamet; Netherlands	4:34.60
Backstroke
100 m backstroke	Melanie Marshall; Great Britain	1:04.68	Camelia-Alina Potec; Romania	1:04.68	Cecilia Blom; Sweden	1:06.77
200 m backstroke	Camelia Potec; Romania	2:20.36	Cecilia Blom; Sweden	2:23.49	Katie Sexton; Great Britain	2:24.19
Breastroke
100 m breaststroke	Ljudmilla Mamontova; Russia	1:13.96	Sarah Lawrence; Great Britain	1:14.16	Irina Donets; Ukraine	1:14.23
200 m breaststroke	Sarah Lawrence; Great Britain	2:34.49	Ljudmila Mamontova; Russia	2:34.60	Monica Pellejero; Spain	2:40.22
Butterfly
100 m butterfly	Melanie Clark; Great Britain	1:05.32	Leonore Kelleher; Ireland	1:05.59	Anna Morgades; Spain	1:06.59
200 m butterfly	Veronica Roda; Italy	2:22.20	Melanie Clark; Great Britain	2:23.00	Alina-Catalina Tabacaru; Romania	2:23.33
Medley
200 m individual medley	Samantha Nesbit; Great Britain	2:22.93	Anna Kwiatkowska; Poland	2:23.91	Krisztina Kaldi; Hungary	2:25.28
Relays
4 × 100 m freestyle relay	Great Britain	4:01.00	Poland	4:06.47	Sweden	4:06.88
4 × 100 m medley relay	Great Britain	4:25.14	Spain	4:30.49	Romania	4:31.08
