= Handball at the 2015 European Youth Summer Olympic Festival =

Handball at the 2015 European Youth Summer Olympic Festival was a handball competition at the 2015 European Youth Summer Olympic Festival held in Tbilisi, Georgia, between 26 July and 1 August 2015.

== Medalist events ==
Event	Gold	Silver	Bronze
Boys	France	Slovenia	Germany
Girls	Russia	Denmark	Norway
