= Short-track speed skating at the 2022 European Youth Olympic Winter Festival =

Short track speed skating at the 2022 European Youth Olympic Winter Festival
- Venue: Vuokatti Arena
- Location: Vuokatti, Finland
- Date: 21–25 March
- Website: eyof2022.fi

Short track speed skating at the 2022 European Youth Olympic Winter Festival was held from 21 to 25 March at Vuokatti Arena in Vuokatti, Finland.

== Competition schedule ==
Sessions that included the event finals are shown in bold.

Date	Time	Event
21 March	9:35	**Girls' 1500 m**
21 March	9:35	**Boys' 1500 m**
21 March	12:30	Mixed 3000 m relay
22 March	9:35	**Girls' 500 m**
22 March	9:35	**Boys' 500 m**
22 March	12:11	Mixed 3000 m relay
25 March	11:05	**Girls' 1000 m**
25 March	11:05	**Boys' 1000 m**
25 March	14:23	**Mixed 3000 m relay**
Source: All times are (UTC+2)

== Medal summary ==
=== Medal table ===
Rank	Nation	Gold	Silver	Bronze	Total
1	Netherlands (NED)	4	0	1	5
2	Italy (ITA)	2	3	1	6
3	France (FRA)	1	1	3	5
4	Hungary (HUN)	0	3	0	3
5	Poland (POL)	0	0	1	1
5	Slovakia (SVK)	0	0	1	1
Totals (6 entries)		7	7	7	21

=== Boys' events ===
Event	Gold		Silver		Bronze	
500 m	Tawan Thomas; France	42.618	Lorenzo Previtali; Italy	42.782	Niels Bergsma; Netherlands	42.956
1000 m	Lorenzo Previtali; Italy	1:32.314	Tawan Thomas; France	1:32.327	Alessandro Loreggia; Italy	1:32.429
1500 m	Alessandro Loreggia; Italy	2:24.110	Lorenzo Previtali; Italy	2:24.284	Tawan Thomas; France	2:24.708

=== Girls' events ===
Event	Gold		Silver		Bronze	
500 m	Zoë Deltrap; Netherlands	46.515	Melinda Schönborn; Hungary	46.567	Tamara Tokárová; Slovakia	46.623
1000 m	Zoë Deltrap; Netherlands	1:37.585	Maja Somodi; Hungary	1:37.716	Bérénice Comby; France	1:37.723
1500 m	Zoë Deltrap; Netherlands	2:28.758	Maja Somodi; Hungary	2:28.882	Eva Grenouilloux; France	2:28.948

=== Mixed event ===
Event	Gold		Silver		Bronze	
Mixed 3000 m relay	Netherlands; Zoë Deltrap; Kiek Straathof; Niels Bergsma; Bas van der Valk	4:20.299	Italy; Margherita Betti; Viola Simonini; Alessandro Loreggia; Lorenzo Previtali	4:23.639	Poland; Agnieszka Bogdanowicz; Karolina Parczewska; Oskar Kurowski; Adam Muchlado	4:30.471
