= Edwin van Calker =

Dutch bobsledder (born 1979)

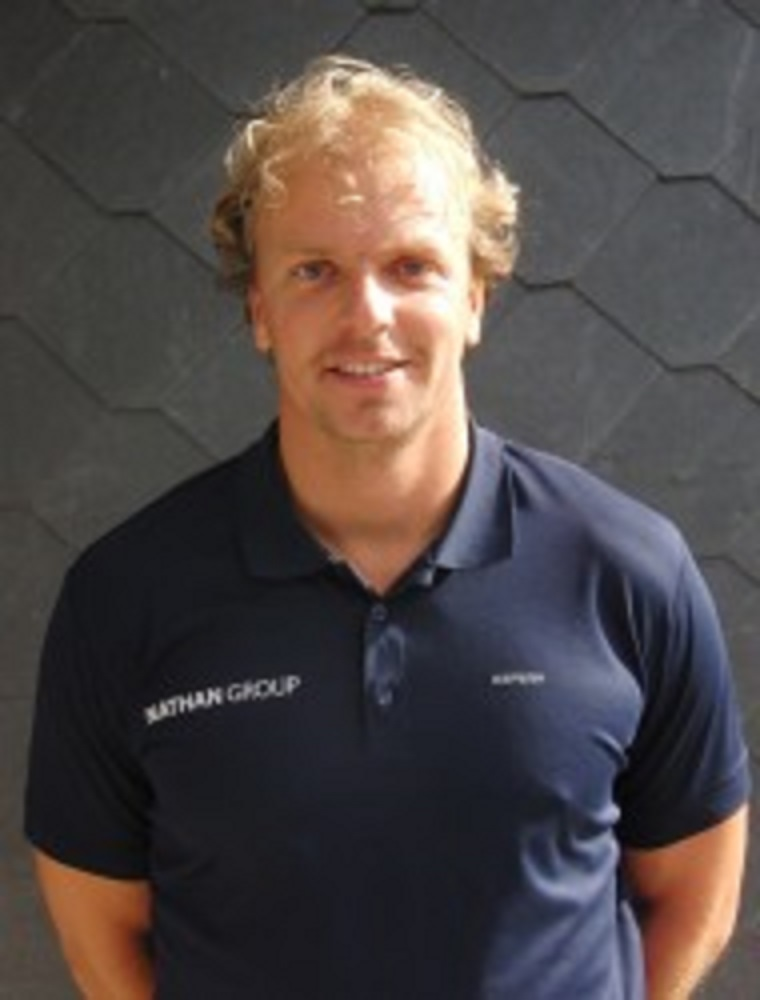

Personal information
- Born: 14 June 1979 (age 47) Gasselternijveenschemond, Drenthe, Netherlands
- Website: www.bobsleeteam.nl

Sport
- Country: Netherlands
- Sport: Bobsled

Edwin van Calker (born 14 June 1979 in Gasselternijveenschemond, Drenthe) is a Dutch bobsledder who has competed since 2001. His best Bobsleigh World Cup finish was third in the two-man event at St. Moritz in January 2010.

Van Calker's best finish at the FIBT World Championships was 14th in the two-man event at St. Moritz in 2007.

At the 2010 Winter Olympics in Vancouver, van Calker finished 14th in the two-man event while withdrawing from the four-man event over safety concerns at the Whistler Sliding Centre.

Prior to his bobsledding career, he competed in sprinting and hurdling events: at the 1995 European Youth Olympic Days he was fourth in the 110 metres hurdles and a bronze medallist in the 4×100 metres relay.
