= 2015 European Youth Summer Olympic Festival =

2015 European Youth Olympic Festival
- Host city: Tbilisi
- Country: Georgia
- Nations: 50
- Athletes: 3,304
- Sport: 9
- Events: 112
- Opening: 26 July 2015
- Closing: 1 August 2015
- Opened by: Irakli Garibashvili
- Athlete's Oath: Mzia Meboshvili
- Coach's Oath: Erekle Arsenishvili
- Torch lighter: Zurab Zviadauri
- Main venue: Mikheil Meskhi Stadium

Summer

Winter

The 2015 European Youth Summer Olympic Festival was held in Tbilisi, Georgia, between 26 July and 1 August 2015.

== Sports ==
2015 European Youth Summer Olympic Festival Sports Programme
- Athletics (36)
- Cycling (4)
- Basketball (2)
- Handball (2)
- Tennis (4)
- Judo (15)
- Gymnastics (14)
- Swimming (32)
- Volleyball (2)

== Venues ==
Venue	Location	Sports
Mikheil Meskhi Stadium	Tbilisi	Ceremonies
David Petriashvili Stadium	Tbilisi	Athletics
Tbilisi Sports Palace	Tbilisi	Basketball (Boys)
Vere Park	Tbilisi	Basketball (Girls)
King David Aghmashenebeli alley / Tbilisi sea circle	Tbilisi	Cycling
Tbilisi Gymnastics Palace (new)	Tbilisi	Gymnastics
New Handball Arena	Tbilisi	Handball
Judo Academy	Tbilisi	Judo
New Aquatic Centre	Tbilisi	Swimming
Mziuri Tennis Courts	Tbilisi	Tennis
New Volleyball Arena	Tbilisi	Volleyball

== Schedule ==
The competition schedule for the 2015 European Youth Olympic Summer Festival is as follows:

OC	Opening ceremony	1	Event finals	CC	Closing ceremony	●	Event competitions

July–August	26 Sun	27 Mon	28 Tue	29 Wed	30 Thu	31 Fri	01 Sat	Events
Ceremonies	OC						CC	
Athletics		●	2	4	5	7	11	36
Basketball		●	●	●		●	2	2
Cycling			2		2			4
Gymnastics			3	3	2	5	5	18
Handball		●	●	●		●	2	2
Judo			4	3	3	3	3	16
Swimming		5	7	7	3	10		32
Tennis		●	●	●	●	●	4	4
Volleyball		●	●	●		●	2	2
Total events		7	19	18	26	27	29	116
Cumulative total		7	26	44	70	97	116	116
July–August	23 Sun	24 Mon	25 Tue	26 Wed	27 Thu	28 Fri	29 Sat	Events

== Participant nations ==
Kosovo made its European Youth Summer Olympic Festival debut at these games.

Participating National Olympic Committees
- Albania (3)
- Andorra (3)
- Armenia (23)
- Austria (44)
- Azerbaijan (36)
- Belarus (62)
- Belgium (77)
- Bosnia and Herzegovina (25)
- Bulgaria (46)
- Croatia (33)
- Cyprus (11)
- Czech Republic (95)
- Denmark (38)
- Estonia (32)
- Finland (60)
- France (91)
- (Georgia (country)) Georgia (138)
- Germany (93)
- (United Kingdom) Great Britain (44)
- Greece (41)
- Hungary (81)
- Iceland (15)
- (Republic of Ireland) Ireland (35)
- Israel (30)
- Italy (104)
- Kosovo (15)
- Latvia (72)
- Liechtenstein (6)
- Lithuania (45)
- Luxembourg (11)
- (North Macedonia) Macedonia (4)
- Malta (2)
- Moldova (19)
- Monaco (5)
- Montenegro (17)
- Netherlands (53)
- Norway (62)
- Poland (87)
- Portugal (24)
- Romania (66)
- Russia (119)
- San Marino (5)
- Serbia (67)
- Slovakia (30)
- Slovenia (60)
- Spain (63)
- Sweden (37)
- Switzerland (58)
- Turkey (84)
- Ukraine (48)

== Mascot ==
The mascot for this edition of European Youth Olympic Festival is named P.E.A.K.Y, which is based on a pheasant. Pheasant was chosen as the mascot due to the connection with a Georgian legend about the founding of Tbilisi. The name P.E.A.K.Y is a combination from the words "peak" and "youth".

== Medal table ==
* Host nation (Georgia)

Rank	Nation	Gold	Silver	Bronze	Total
1	Russia (RUS)	17	9	11	37
2	Italy (ITA)	12	2	10	24
3	France (FRA)	9	5	8	22
4	Hungary (HUN)	9	3	11	23
5	Slovenia (SLO)	5	6	5	16
6	Moldova (MDA)	5	2	0	7
7	Great Britain (GBR)	4	8	8	20
8	Spain (ESP)	4	8	6	18
9	Netherlands (NED)	4	3	8	15
10	Georgia (GEO)*	4	0	6	10
11	Germany (GER)	3	8	6	17
12	Ukraine (UKR)	3	7	1	11
13	Belgium (BEL)	3	6	5	14
14	Romania (ROU)	3	5	2	10
15	Belarus (BLR)	3	0	4	7
16	Ireland (IRL)	2	6	2	10
17	Serbia (SRB)	2	4	3	9
18	Switzerland (SUI)	2	3	2	7
19	Finland (FIN)	2	3	1	6
20	Sweden (SWE)	2	3	0	5
21	Czech Republic (CZE)	2	2	3	7
22	Azerbaijan (AZE)	2	1	2	5
23	Norway (NOR)	2	0	4	6
24	Austria (AUT)	2	0	1	3
25	Poland (POL)	1	3	5	9
26	Turkey (TUR)	1	2	3	6
27	Bulgaria (BUL)	1	2	0	3
27	Denmark (DEN)	1	2	0	3
29	Croatia (CRO)	1	0	3	4
30	Bosnia and Herzegovina (BIH)	1	0	0	1
30	Estonia (EST)	1	0	0	1
32	Israel (ISR)	0	5	0	5
33	Latvia (LAT)	0	3	0	3
34	Slovakia (SVK)	0	2	2	4
35	Cyprus (CYP)	0	1	1	2
36	Montenegro (MNE)	0	1	0	1
37	Greece (GRE)	0	0	2	2
Totals (37 entries)		113	115	125	353
