= 1999 European Youth Olympic Winter Days =

1999 edition of the European Youth Olympic Winter Festival

- Host city: Poprad-Tatry
- Country: Slovakia
- Nations: 40
- Athletes: 819
- Sport: 7
- Events: 27
- Opening: 6 March 1999
- Closing: 12 March 1999

Summer

Winter

The 1999 Winter European Youth Olympic Winter Days was an international multi-sport event held between 6 and 12 March 1999, in Poprad-Tatry, Slovakia.

== Sports ==
1999 European Youth Olympic Winter Days Sports Programme
- Alpine skiing (6)
- Biathlon (5)
- Cross-country skiing (5)
- Figure skating (3)
- Ice hockey (1)
- Short track speed skating (5)
- Ski jumping (2)

== Medalists ==
=== Alpine skiing ===
Event	Gold	Silver	Bronze
Boys giant slalom	Peter Fill; Italy	Robi Perren; Switzerland	Mario Scheiber; Austria
Girls giant slalom	Jaana-Maarit Välimäki; Finland	Marion Rolland; France	Chemmy Alcott; Great Britain
Boys slalom	Peter Fill; Italy	Loic Paquotte; France	Jouni Kaitala; Finland
Girls slalom	Sandrine Aubert; France	Astrid Vierthaler; Austria	Marion Rolland; France
Boys super-G	Werner Heel; Italy	Mario Scheiber; Austria	Philipp Schörghofer; Austria
Girls super-G	Marion Rolland; France	Chemmy Alcott; Great Britain	Sabrina Raich; Austria

=== Biathlon ===
Event	Gold	Silver	Bronze
Boys 10 km	Vitali Tchernychev; Russia	Alexei Konchine; Russia	Kent Rog Guttormsen; Norway
Girls 7,5 km	Joulia Makarova; Russia	Tora Berger; Norway	Ekaterin Outotchkina; Russia
Boys 7,5 km sprint	Alexei Konchine; Russia	Vitali Tchernychev; Russia	Bartlomiej Ponikwia; Poland
Girls 6 km sprint	Joulia Makarova; Russia	Ekaterin Outotchkina; Russia	Alexandra Raluc Rusu; Romania
Mixed relay 4x5 km	Team Slovakia; Slovakia	Team Russia; Russia	Team Norway; Norway

=== Cross-country skiing ===
Event	Gold	Silver	Bronze
Boys 10 km classic	Kristian Horntvedt; Norway	Nikolai Pankratov; Russia	Vaclav Svub; Czech Republic
Girls 7,5 km classic	Carin Holmberg; Sweden	Anastassia Kazakoul; Russia	Evguenia Kravtsova; Russia
Boys 10 km free	Oleg Milovanov; Russia	Alessandro Zenoni; Italy	Nejc Brodar; Slovenia
Girls 7,5 km free	Evguenia Kravtsova; Russia	Riikka Sarasoja; Finland	Ursina Badilatti; Switzerland
Mixed relay 4x5 km free	Team Russia; Russia	Team Norway; Norway	Team Finland; Finland

=== Figure skating ===
Event	Gold	Silver	Bronze
Boys	Stanislav Timtchenko; Russia	Stephane Lambiel; Switzerland	Alan Street; Great Britain
Girls	Tamara Dorofejev; Hungary	Sarah Meier; Switzerland	Svetlana Chernysheva; Russia
Ice dancing	Anastasia Litvinenko; Maxim Bolotin; Russia	Viktoria Polzykina; Alexander Shakalov; Ukraine	Myriam Trividic; Aurelien Geraud; France

=== Ice hockey ===
Event	Gold	Silver	Bronze
Boys	Team Finland; Finland	Team Sweden; Sweden	Team Czech Republic; Czech Republic

=== Short track speed skating ===
Event	Gold	Silver	Bronze
Boys 500 m	Andreé Hartwig; Germany	Cees Juffermans; Netherlands	Marco Mattia; Italy
Girls 500 m	Stephanie Bouvier; France	Liesbeth Mau-Asam; Netherlands	Christine Priebst; Germany
Boys 1000 m	Cees Juffermans; Netherlands	Christian Lukas; Austria	Ward Janssens; Belgium
Girls 1000 m	Christine Priebst; Germany	Stephanie Bouvier; France	Veronika Windisch; Austria
Mixed relay 3000 m	Team Netherlands; Netherlands	Team France; France	Team Belgium; Belgium

=== Ski jumping ===
Event	Gold	Silver	Bronze
Boys K90	Veli-Mati Lindström; Finland	Stefan Kaiser; Austria	Akseli Lajunen; Finland
Team K90	Team Austria; Austria	Team Finland; Finland	Team Slovenia; Slovenia

== Medal table ==
* Host nation (Slovakia)

Rank	Nation	Gold	Silver	Bronze	Total
1	Russia (RUS)	9	6	3	18
2	France (FRA)	3	4	2	9
3	Finland (FIN)	3	2	3	8
4	Italy (ITA)	3	1	1	5
5	Netherlands (NED)	2	2	0	4
6	Germany (GER)	2	0	1	3
7	Austria (AUT)	1	4	4	9
8	Norway (NOR)	1	2	2	5
9	Sweden (SWE)	1	1	0	2
10	Hungary (HUN)	1	0	0	1
10	Slovakia (SVK)*	1	0	0	1
12	Switzerland (SUI)	0	3	1	4
13	Great Britain (GBR)	0	1	2	3
14	Ukraine (UKR)	0	1	0	1
15	Belgium (BEL)	0	0	2	2
15	Czech Republic (CZE)	0	0	2	2
15	Slovenia (SLO)	0	0	2	2
18	Poland (POL)	0	0	1	1
18	Romania (ROM)	0	0	1	1
Totals (19 entries)		27	27	27	81
