= Zoë Deltrap =

Dutch speed skater (born 2005)

Personal information
- Nationality: Dutch
- Born: 24 March 2005 (age 21) Scheveningen, Netherlands

Sport
- Country: Netherlands
- Sport: Short track speed skating
Medal record
Women's short-track speed skating
Representing the Netherlands
World Championships
Gold medal – first place	2026 Montreal	3000 m relay
Bronze medal – third place	2025 Beijing	3000 m relay
European Championships
Gold medal – first place	2026 Tilburg	3000 m relay
Silver medal – second place	2025 Dresden	2000 m mixed relay
Silver medal – second place	2026 Tilburg	1500 m
World Junior Championships
Silver medal – second place	2022 Gdansk	3000 m relay
European Youth Olympics
Gold medal – first place	2022 Vuokatti	500 m
Gold medal – first place	2022 Vuokatti	1000 m
Gold medal – first place	2022 Vuokatti	1500 m
Gold medal – first place	2022 Vuokatti	2000 m mixed relay

Zoë Florence Deltrap (born 24 March 2005) is a Dutch short-track speed skater. Deltrap was part of the Dutch teams that won the silver medal at the 2025 European championships and the bronze medal at the 2025 World championships. Deltrap will represent the Netherlands at the 2026 Winter Olympics.

== Career ==
Deltrap is a daughter of former short-track speed skater Priscilla Ernst. At 17, she won all four gold medals at the 2022 European Youth Olympics and was part of the team that won the silver medal at the 2022 World Junior Championships.

At the Dutch national championships in 2024, Deltrap fell and injured herself seriously. She lost most of the season.

In 2025, Deltrap was part of the Dutch mixed team with Jens van ´t Wout, Michelle Velzeboer and Teun Boer that won the silver medal at the European Championships. She was part of the Dutch women's team with Diede van Oorschot, Michelle and Xandra Velzeboer that won the bronze medal at the 3000 m relay.
