= Athletics at the 2003 European Youth Summer Olympic Festival =

The athletics competition at the 2003 European Youth Summer Olympic Festival was held from 28 to 31 July. The events took place at the Charléty Stadium in Paris, France. Boys and girls born 1986 or 1987 or later participated 31 track and field events, with similar programmes for the sexes with the exception of no steeplechase event for girls.

== Medal summary ==
=== Men ===
Event	Gold		Silver		Bronze	
100 metres	Wade Bennett-Jackson (GBR)	10.70	Benjamin Sunier (SUI)	10.82	Per Strandquist (SWE)	10.89
200 metres	Wade Bennett-Jackson (GBR)	21.38	Desislav Gunev (BUL)	21.64	José López (ESP)	21.84
400 metres	Željko Vincek (CRO)	47.41	Aitor Martín (ESP)	47.84	Claudio Licciardello (ITA)	47.87
800 metres	Jozef Repčík (SVK)	1:49.96	Dávid Takács (HUN)	1:50.96	Mattias Claesson (SWE)	1:51.18
1500 metres	Barnabás Bene (HUN)	3:58.58	Colin Costello (IRL)	3:59.07	Víctor Montaner (ESP)	3:59.72
3000 metres	László Tóth (HUN)	8:28.15	Dušan Markešević (SCG)	8:28.16	Ali Yaydar Tekgöz (TUR)	8:32.34
110 metres hurdles	Denis Byvakin (RUS)	13.66	Arnaldo Abrantes (POR)	13.74	Konstadinos Douvalidis (GRE)	13.75
400 metres hurdles	Milton Dias (POR)	51.85	Milan Kotur (CRO)	52.37	Mark Wiebe (GER)	53.35
2000 metres steeplechase	Stefan Patru (ROU)	5:50.00	Martin Mužík (CZE)	5:51.97	Colin Costello (IRL)	5:52.85
4 × 100 m relay	France (FRA)	41.65	Sweden (SWE)	42.25	Finland (FIN)	42.39
High jump	Philipp Britner (RUS)	2.07 m	Vladimir Herasymchuk (UKR)	2.07 m	Emilios Xenofontos (CYP)	2.07 m
Pole vault	Aleksandr Gripich (RUS)	4.95 m	Benoît Jozan (FRA)	4.90 m	Konstadinos Filippidis (GRE)	4.80 m
Long jump	Andrejs Maskancevs (LAT)	7.37 m	Aleksandr Soldatkin (UKR)	7.31 m	Dimitar Galchev (BUL)	7.24 m
Shot put	Mamuka Tugushi (GEO)	19.62 m	Remigius Machura (CZE)	19.34 m	Vidas Klibavicius (LTU)	17.97 m
Discus throw	Margus Hunt (EST)	63.56 m	Kamil Grzegorczyk (POL)	60.38 m	Oleg Pirog (RUS)	59.85 m
Javelin throw	Sebastian Jachimowicz (POL)	73.71 m	Aleksandrs Ivanovs (LAT)	69.60 m	Ari Mannio (FIN)	67.83 m

=== Women ===
Event	Gold		Silver		Bronze	
100 metres	Lina Grinčikaitė (LTU)	11.95	Olivia Borlée (BEL)	12.01	Nicole MacDermott (GBR)	12.07
200 metres	Symphora Béhi (FRA)	24.04	Olivia Borlée (BEL)	24.10	Yelena Khvashevskaya (RUS)	24.17
400 metres	Antonina Krivoshapka (RUS)	53.37	Angela Moroșanu (ROU)	54.11	Ernesta Tomza (POL)	54.40
800 metres	Olga Cristea (MDA)	2:05.61	Mariya Shapayeva (RUS)	2:06.66	Larisa Arcip (ROU)	2:07.18
1500 metres	Nataliia Lupu (UKR)	4:23.70	Jelena Stina (LAT)	4:23.83	Susan Kuijken (NED)	4:30.70
3000 metres	Susan Kuijken (NED)	9:47.07	Zhanna Klimovich (UKR)	9:47.56	Rachael Nathan (GBR)	9:50.10
100 metres hurdles	Christina Vukicevic (NOR)	13.85	Axelle Francoise-Haugrin (FRA)	13.92	Iris Eberhard (GER)	13.94
400 metres hurdles	Sara Petersen (DEN)	60.18	Evelin Sosnovski (EST)	60.61	Christine Bjørkvik (NOR)	60.66
4 × 100 m relay	Sweden (SWE)	46.57	Germany (GER)	46.82	Poland (POL)	46.98
High jump	Iryna Kovalenko (UKR)	1.86 m	Svetlana Shkolina (RUS)	1.84 m	Oldriška Marešová (CZE)	1.82 m
Pole vault	Svetlana Makarevich (BLR)	3.80 m	Hélène Subervie (FRA)	3.70 m	Enikö Erös (HUN)	3.70 m
Long jump	Cristine Spataru (ROU)	6.26 m	Yelena Kremneva (RUS)	6.17 m	Zhanna Demydova (UKR)	6.05 m
Shot put	Irina Tarasova (RUS)	14.92 m	Alina Vaisvilaité (LTU)	14.67 m	Magdalena Sobieszek (POL)	14.57 m
Discus throw	Liliana Cá (POR)	47.53 m	Josipa Jeličić (CRO)	45.42 m	Michaela Margócziová (SVK)	45.35 m
Javelin throw	Maria Negoita (ROU)	49.84 m	Bregje Crolla (NED)	49.64 m	Berna Demirci (TUR)	49.08 m
