= Tennis at the 2013 European Youth Summer Olympic Festival =

- Venue: Olympic Sports Park - Tennis Center
- Dates: 15–19 July

Tennis at the 2013 European Youth Summer Olympic Festival was held at Olympic Sports Park, Utrecht, Netherlands from 15 to 19 July 2013.

Tennis had doubles and singles events for men and women competition.

== Medalists ==
Event	Gold	Silver	Bronze
Boys singles	Marko Osmakcic; Switzerland	Matthias Haim; Austria	Stefanos Tsitsipas; Greece
Boys doubles	Germany; Jannik Giesse; Louis Wessels	Estonia; Kristofer Siimar; Mattias Siimar	Sweden; Filip Malbasic; Mikael Ymer
Girls singles	Viktória Kužmová; Slovakia	Daria Kruzhkova; Russia	Anastasia Dețiuc; Moldova
Girls doubles	Slovakia; Viktória Kužmová; Tereza Mihalíková	Germany; Anna Gabric; Vivian Wolff	Georgia; Ana Akhalkatsi; Mariam Bolkvadze

== Medal table ==
Rank	Nation	Gold	Silver	Bronze	Total
1	Slovakia (SVK)	2	0	0	2
2	Germany (GER)	1	1	0	2
3	Switzerland (SUI)	1	0	0	1
4	Austria (AUT)	0	1	0	1
4	Estonia (EST)	0	1	0	1
4	Russia (RUS)	0	1	0	1
7	Georgia (GEO)	0	0	1	1
7	Greece (GRE)	0	0	1	1
7	Moldova (MLD)	0	0	1	1
7	Poland (POL)	0	0	1	1
Totals (10 entries)		4	4	4	12
