= Biathlon at the 2025 European Youth Olympic Winter Festival =

- Venue: Bakuriani Biathlon-Cross Country Stadium
- Location: Bakuriani, Georgia
- Date: 10–16 February

Biathlon at the 2025 European Youth Olympic Winter Festival was held from 10 to 16 February at Bakuriani Biathlon-Cross Country Stadium, in Bakuriani, Georgia.

== Medal summary ==
=== Medal table ===
* Host nation (Georgia)

Rank	Nation	Gold	Silver	Bronze	Total
1	Poland (POL)	2	0	0	2
1	Slovakia (SVK)	2	0	0	2
3	Italy (ITA)	1	0	2	3
4	Ukraine (UKR)	1	0	0	1
5	France (FRA)	0	3	0	3
6	Czech Republic (CZE)	0	2	1	3
7	Slovenia (SLO)	0	1	0	1
8	Switzerland (SUI)	0	0	2	2
9	Austria (AUT)	0	0	1	1
Totals (9 entries)		6	6	6	18

=== Boys' events ===
Event	Gold		Silver		Bronze	
7.5 km sprint	Grzegorz Galica; Poland	21:03.4 (1+1)	Esteban Moreira; France	21:42.7 (0+0)	Julian Huber; Italy	22:07.8 (1+1)
12.5 km individual	Grzegorz Galica; Poland	35:08.7 (1+1+0+1)	Nans Madelenat; France	35:23.5 (1+1+0+0)	Rafael Santer; Italy	36:08.6 (0+0+1+0)

=== Girls' events ===
Event	Gold		Silver		Bronze	
6 km sprint	Michaela Straková; Slovakia	19:21.9 (0+0)	Ajda Spitalar; Slovenia	19:56.5 (0+0)	Lucie Jandurová; Czech Republic	20:05.8 (0+2)
10 km individual	Michaela Straková; Slovakia	31:53.3 (0+0+0+2)	Juliette Oliva; France	33:43.1 (1+2+0+1)	Giannina Piller; Switzerland	33:47.3 (0+1+1+0)

=== Mixed events ===
Event	Gold		Silver		Bronze	
Single mixed relay	Ukraine Viktoriia Khvostenko; Taras Tarasiuk	40:20.7	Czech Republic Lucie Jandurová; Daniel Ryška	40:37.5	Switzerland Molly Kafka; Levin Janis Kunz	41:16.2
4 x 6 km mixed relay	Italy Rafael Santer; Julian Huber; Gaia Gondolo; Thea Wanker	1:09:40.2	Czech Republic Daniel Ryška; Michael Málek; Tereza Petrošová; Lucie Jandurová	1:11:00.1	Austria Simon Hechenberger; Simon Grasberger; Katharina Puergy; Selina Ganner	1:11:23.6

== Results ==
=== Boys' 12.5 kilometer individual ===
Rank	Name	Nation	Shooting penalties					Ski Time	Result	Behind
Rank	Name	Nation	P	S	P	S	T	Ski Time	Result	Behind
1st place, gold medalist(s)	Grzegorz Galica	Poland	1	1	0	1	3	32:53.7	35:08.7	0
2nd place, silver medalist(s)	Nans Madelenat	France	1	1	0	0	2	33:53.5	35:23.5	+14.8
3rd place, bronze medalist(s)	Rafael Santer	Italy	0	0	1	0	1	35:23.6	36:08.6	+59.9
4	Taras Tarasiuk	Ukraine	0	0	0	1	1	35:52.2	36:37.2	+1:28.5
5	Simon Hechenberger	Austria	0	1	0	0	1	35:58.4	36:43.4	+1:34.7
6	Esteban Moreira	France	1	0	0	1	2	35:16.5	36:46.5	+1:37.8
7	Andreas Braunhofer	Italy	1	1	0	0	2	35:25.2	36:55.2	+1:46.5
8	Georgi Dzhorgov	Bulgaria	2	0	1	1	4	34:45.8	37:45.8	+2:37.1
9	Emile Perrillat Bottonet	France	0	1	0	1	2	36:25.7	37:55.7	+2:47.0
10	Jaka Pilar	Slovenia	1	3	0	1	5	34:30.6	38:15.6	+3:06.9
11	Nikolay Nikolov	Bulgaria	1	1	1	1	4	35:22.8	38:22.8	+3:14.1
12	Premysl Dolecek	Czech Republic	0	1	1	0	2	36:53.9	38:23.9	+3:15.2
13	Janis Kunz Levin	Switzerland	3	2	0	0	5	34:56.2	38:41.2	+3:32.5
14	Drejc Meglic	Slovenia	0	0	1	1	2	37:14.7	38:44.7	+3:36.0
15	Matti Pinter	Austria	3	0	2	0	5	35:10.2	38:55.2	+3:46.5
16	Ivan Zahoruiko	Ukraine	0	2	1	2	5	35:27.5	39:12.5	+4:03.8
17	Markus Sklenarik	Slovakia	1	1	2	2	6	34:43.1	39:13.1	+4:04.4
18	Jesco Mengis	Switzerland	1	0	2	2	5	35:28.5	39:13.5	+4:04.8
19	Julian Huber	Italy	3	1	0	2	6	35:05.6	39:35.6	+4:26.9
20	Tuomas Latvalahti	Finland	1	0	1	3	5	36:00.6	39:45.6	+4:36.9
21	Topias Ollikka	Finland	0	2	0	2	4	36:53.2	39:53.2	+4:44.5
22	Lukas Vejvoda	Czech Republic	3	0	1	2	6	35:30.3	40:00.3	+4:51.6
23	Daniel Ryska	Czech Republic	0	3	2	1	6	35:56.5	40:26.5	+5:17.8
24	Michael Malek	Czech Republic	1	0	3	2	6	36:05.2	40:35.2	+5:26.5
25	Emile Weiss	France	0	4	1	3	8	34:46.0	40:46.0	+5:37.3
26	Srdan Lalovic	Bosnia and Herzegovina	1	1	0	3	5	37:15.3	41:00.3	+5:51.6
27	Pablo Baselgia	Switzerland	1	2	1	1	5	37:38.3	41:23.3	+6:14.6
28	Filippo Massimino	Italy	0	3	2	2	7	36:12.3	41:27.3	+6:18.6
29	Andrey Nochev	Bulgaria	1	1	0	3	5	37:44.1	41:29.1	+6:20.4
30	Arttu Remes	Finland	2	2	2	1	7	36:19.5	41:34.5	+6:25.8
31	Kajetan Urbaniak	Poland	1	2	1	2	6	37:12.0	41:42.0	+6:33.3
32	Robin Puusaar	Estonia	1	2	0	1	4	38:43.1	41:43.1	+6:34.4
33	Adam Schon	Slovakia	0	1	1	2	4	38:43.8	41:43.8	+6:35.1
34	Vladut Lupoiu	Romania	1	1	1	1	4	38:46.1	41:46.1	+6:37.4
35	Rudolfs Raudzins	Latvia	1	1	2	2	6	37:24.4	41:54.4	+6:45.7
36	Simon Grasberger	Austria	2	1	1	1	5	38:18.5	42:03.5	+6:54.8
37	Sebastian Garbowski	Poland	2	0	1	1	4	39:25.5	42:25.5	+7:16.8
38	Simon Kristofik	Slovakia	2	2	2	2	8	36:29.3	42:29.3	+7:20.6
39	Ivo Nagode	Slovenia	2	3	2	1	8	36:52.3	42:52.3	+7:43.6
40	Kazimierz Siwa	Poland	2	1	1	1	5	39:13.6	42:58.6	+7:49.9
41	Tobit Keller	Switzerland	3	4	1	1	9	36:21.9	43:06.9	+7:58.2
42	Yaroslav Harkusha	Ukraine	1	2	4	1	8	37:29.2	43:29.2	+8:20.5
43	Kristen Raian Baumann	Estonia	3	1	2	3	9	36:47.6	43:32.6	+8:23.9
44	Gregor Rupnik	Slovenia	4	1	2	2	9	36:55.0	43:40.0	+8:31.3
45	Bulut Meral	Turkey	1	1	2	1	5	40:14.0	43:59.0	+8:50.3
46	Petar Ginoski	North Macedonia	0	1	1	4	6	39:30.0	44:00.0	+8:51.3
47	Dominik Lopuhhin	Estonia	3	3	0	3	9	37:23.4	44:08.4	+8:59.7
48	Matias Hietamaki	Finland	3	2	3	4	12	35:09.7	44:09.7	+9:01.0
49	Rainers Krismanis	Latvia	2	1	1	1	5	40:40.6	44:25.6	+9:16.9
50	Alex Hrit	Romania	0	1	1	1	3	42:18.5	44:33.5	+9:24.8
51	Kostiantyn Martseniuk	Ukraine	4	2	0	2	8	38:44.1	44:44.1	+9:35.4
52	Dinu Belevac	Moldova	2	3	1	2	8	39:02.7	45:02.7	+9:54.0
53	Oliver Gajdosovci	Slovakia	3	2	3	4	12	36:06.1	45:06.1	+9:57.4
54	Laszlo Samuel Kunos	Hungary	1	2	2	2	7	39:58.6	45:13.6	+10:04.9
55	Samuel Eder	Austria	3	2	2	3	10	37:49.2	45:19.2	+10:10.5
56	Bogdan Jifcu	Romania	3	1	2	2	8	39:24.6	45:24.6	+10:15.9
57	Ernests Solovjovs	Latvia	2	1	3	1	7	40:18.5	45:33.5	+10:24.8
58	Daniel Besze	Hungary	3	5	1	2	11	39:35.5	47:50.5	+12:41.8
59	Lukas Mincevic	Lithuania	2	3	0	2	7	42:43.1	47:58.1	+12:49.4
60	Mehmet Sefa Ertas	Turkey	4	3	4	1	12	39:19.2	48:19.2	+13:10.5
61	Hunor Udvari	Romania	1	4	3	2	10	41:01.4	48:31.4	+13:22.7
62	Martin Hollo	Hungary	4	4	3	1	12	40:32.7	49:32.7	+14:24.0
63	Eimantas Lekavicius	Lithuania	0	2	3	3	8	44:01.4	50:01.4	+14:52.7
64	Shio Kuchukian	Georgia	3	4	3	4	14	53:19.9	1:03:49.9	+28:41.2

=== Girls' 10 kilometer individual ===
Rank	Name	Nation	Shooting					Ski Time	Result	Behind
Rank	Name	Nation	P	S	P	S	T	Ski Time	Result	Behind
1st place, gold medalist(s)	Michaela Strakova	Slovakia	0	0	0	2	2	30:23.3	31:53.3	0
2nd place, silver medalist(s)	Juliette Oliva	France	1	2	0	1	4	30:43.1	33:43.1	+1:49.8
3rd place, bronze medalist(s)	Giannina Piller	Switzerland	0	1	1	0	2	32:17.3	33:47.3	+1:54.0
4	Ajda Spitalar	Slovenia	0	1	0	1	2	32:26.9	33:56.9	+2:03.6
5	Hanni Koski	Finland	0	0	2	1	3	31:49.4	34:04.4	+2:11.1
6	Rosalie Odile	France	1	1	1	2	5	30:38.2	34:23.2	+2:29.9
7	Selina Ganner	Austria	0	2	0	2	4	31:27.3	34:27.3	+2:34.0
8	Raya Adzhamova	Bulgaria	0	2	1	1	4	31:27.7	34:27.7	+2:34.4
9	Maelle Achoui	France	1	3	0	1	5	30:46.8	34:31.8	+2:38.5
10	Nika Pelan	Slovenia	0	2	0	0	2	33:15.2	34:45.2	+2:51.9
11	Gaia Gondolo	Italy	2	1	0	1	4	31:49.1	34:49.1	+2:55.8
12	Rosibel Kaldvee	Estonia	0	3	0	0	3	32:34.6	34:49.6	+2:56.3
13	Viktoriia Yasenych	Ukraine	0	1	1	1	3	32:45.5	35:00.5	+3:07.2
14	Buffet Romane Ouvrier	France	1	2	2	1	6	30:41.2	35:11.2	+3:17.9
15	Justyna Sinkiewicz	Poland	0	2	0	2	4	32:13.5	35:13.5	+3:20.2
16	Mellano Magali Miraglio	Italy	0	3	0	2	5	31:33.7	35:18.7	+3:25.4
17	Molly Kafka	Switzerland	1	1	2	1	5	31:35.8	35:20.8	+3:27.5
18	Elizaveta Hlusovici	Moldova	0	0	2	1	3	33:12.0	35:27.0	+3:33.7
19	Ema Sobol	Croatia	1	1	0	3	5	31:58.0	35:43.0	+3:49.7
20	Anni Naumanen	Finland	0	1	0	2	3	33:34.8	35:49.8	+3:56.5
21	Thea Wanker	Italy	2	1	0	1	4	32:54.1	35:54.1	+4:00.8
22	Ella Kuncikova	Czech Republic	3	1	0	2	6	31:26.6	35:56.6	+4:03.3
23	Tereza Petrosova	Czech Republic	1	2	1	0	4	33:24.0	36:24.0	+4:30.7
24	Lucie Jandurova	Czech Republic	1	1	0	4	6	31:55.7	36:25.7	+4:32.4
25	Katharina Puergy	Austria	3	1	0	1	5	33:02.0	36:47.0	+4:53.7
26	Keita Kolna	Latvia	0	0	1	1	2	35:26.6	36:56.6	+5:03.3
27	Gabriela Gasienica	Poland	3	0	1	2	6	32:32.7	37:02.7	+5:09.4
28	Celina Jost	Austria	2	1	0	2	5	33:21.4	37:06.4	+5:13.1
29	Ula Perko	Slovenia	0	2	0	1	3	35:00.7	37:15.7	+5:22.4
30	Adela Liptaiova	Slovakia	3	1	1	0	5	33:34.5	37:19.5	+5:26.2
31	Nikol Klenovska	Bulgaria	2	1	1	2	6	32:54.9	37:24.9	+5:31.6
32	Simone Eder	Austria	0	1	4	0	5	33:47.5	37:32.5	+5:39.2
33	Yoana Dzhandreva	Bulgaria	2	2	1	1	6	33:07.5	37:37.5	+5:44.2
34	Luna Forneris	Italy	3	2	1	3	9	30:53.1	37:38.1	+5:44.8
35	Varvara Kalyta	Ukraine	3	3	0	1	7	32:35.5	37:50.5	+5:57.2
36	Eliane Kiser	Switzerland	2	1	2	1	6	33:21.7	37:51.7	+5:58.4
37	Dominika Kocmankova	Czech Republic	2	2	1	0	5	34:12.8	37:57.8	+6:04.5
38	Sophia Imwinkelried	Switzerland	2	2	1	3	8	31:58.4	37:58.4	+6:05.1
39	Krisztina Sillo	Romania	1	2	1	2	6	33:36.7	38:06.7	+6:13.4
40	Alina Khmil	Ukraine	1	4	0	2	7	32:59.8	38:14.8	+6:21.5
41	Martine Djatkovica	Latvia	3	1	1	2	7	33:07.0	38:22.0	+6:28.7
42	Laureen Simberg	Estonia	0	2	1	2	5	34:42.4	38:27.4	+6:34.1
43	Anita Zwolinska	Poland	3	1	0	2	6	34:00.3	38:30.3	+6:37.0
44	Kinga Tkocz	Poland	1	2	2	1	6	34:14.1	38:44.1	+6:50.8
45	Mirtel Kaljumaee	Estonia	0	3	5	1	9	32:00.3	38:45.3	+6:52.0
46	Nora Flyvholm Berg	Denmark	2	2	2	0	6	34:16.7	38:46.7	+6:53.4
47	Dominika Patrasova	Slovakia	1	1	1	5	8	33:18.9	39:18.9	+7:25.6
48	Ziva Bijol	Slovenia	0	3	2	3	8	33:43.7	39:43.7	+7:50.4
49	Rusne Motiejunaite	Lithuania	1	3	1	1	6	35:21.2	39:51.2	+7:57.9
50	Laura Alzina	Latvia	1	2	0	3	6	35:22.4	39:52.4	+7:59.1
51	Lamija Salihagic	Serbia	3	2	2	3	10	32:28.0	39:58.0	+8:04.7
52	Aino Koskela	Finland	2	3	0	4	9	33:15.7	40:00.7	+8:07.4
53	Karin Abrahamova	Slovakia	2	1	3	0	6	36:19.9	40:49.9	+8:56.6
54	Isla Cadell	Great Britain	3	1	2	3	9	34:14.4	40:59.4	+9:06.1
55	Janka Kurko	Romania	1	3	0	3	7	36:02.6	41:17.6	+9:24.3
56	Chiara Gasparac	Croatia	0	2	1	1	4	38:43.2	41:43.2	+9:49.9
57	Rabia Neval Tekin	Turkey	3	3	0	3	9	35:00.1	41:45.1	+9:51.8
58	Maija Rajala	Finland	3	3	2	3	11	34:34.6	42:49.6	+10:56.3
59	Eliza Sidlauskaite	Lithuania	1	1	2	2	6	38:54.3	43:24.3	+11:31.0
60	Boglarka Kelemen	Romania	3	2	1	1	7	38:21.7	43:36.7	+11:43.4
61	Dora Gaal	Hungary	2	4	2	2	10	36:34.2	44:04.2	+12:10.9
62	Lili Benyovszky	Hungary	2	2	2	2	8	38:06.7	44:06.7	+12:13.4
63	Georgia Tsiarka	Greece	3	3	3	1	10	37:29.7	44:59.7	+13:06.4
64	Nurefsan Cinar	Turkey	3	2	3	2	10	37:29.9	44:59.9	+13:06.6
65	Boroka Tamas	Romania	3	2	5	3	13	35:55.9	45:40.9	+13:47.6
66	Panni Csikasz	Hungary	2	1	4	3	10	40:34.6	48:04.6	+16:11.3
67	Ariadni Kostouli	Greece	1	5	1	3	10	42:02.6	49:32.6	+17:39.3

== Participating nations ==
- Austria (8)
- Bosnia and Herzegovina (1)
- Bulgaria (6)
- Croatia (2)
- Czech Republic (8)
- Denmark (1)
- Estonia (6)
- Finland (8)
- France (8)
- Georgia (1)
- (United Kingdom) Great Britain (1)
- Greece (2)
- Hungary (6)
- Italy (8)
- Latvia (6)
- Lithuania (4)
- Moldova (2)
- North Macedonia (1)
- Poland (8)
- Romania (8)
- Serbia (1)
- Slovakia (8)
- Slovenia (8)
- Switzerland (8)
- Turkey (4)
- Ukraine (8)
