= 2001 European Youth Summer Olympic Festival =

2001 European Youth Olympic Festival
- Host city: Murcia
- Country: Spain
- Nations: 48
- Athletes: 2,500
- Sport: 10
- Events: 90
- Opening: 22 July 2001
- Closing: 26 July 2001
- Opened by: Juan Carlos I of Spain

Summer

Winter

The 2001 European Youth Summer Olympic Festival (Spanish: Festival Olímpico de la Juventud Europea 2001) was the sixth edition of multi-sport event for European youths between the ages of 12 and 18. It was held in Murcia, Spain from 22 to 26 July. A total of ten sports were contested. The event received financial support from the Olympic Solidarity programme.

== Sports ==
2001 European Youth Summer Olympic Festival Sports Programme
- Athletics
- Basketball
- Football
- Gymnastics
- Handball
- Judo
- Sailing
- Swimming
- Tennis
- Volleyball

== Venues ==
Venue	Location	Sports
Estadio de Atletismo Monte Romero	Murcia	Athletics
Pabellón J.M. Cagigal	Murcia	Basketball
CAR "Infanta Cristina"	Murcia	Cycling
Estadio de La Condomina	Murcia	Football
Palacio Principe de Asturias	Murcia	Handball, Judo
Murcia Club de Tenis	Murcia	Tennis

== Participating nations ==
Participating National Olympic Committees
- Albania
- Andorra
- Armenia
- Austria
- Azerbaijan
- Belarus
- Belgium
- Bosnia and Herzegovina
- Bulgaria
- Croatia
- Cyprus
- Czech Republic
- Denmark
- Estonia (26)
- Finland
- FR Yugoslavia
- FYR Macedonia
- France
- Georgia
- Germany
- Great Britain
- Greece
- Hungary
- Iceland
- Ireland
- Israel
- Italy
- Latvia
- Liechtenstein
- Lithuania
- Luxembourg
- Malta
- Moldova
- Monaco
- Netherlands
- Norway
- Poland
- Portugal
- Romania
- Russia
- San Marino
- Slovakia
- Slovenia
- Spain
- Sweden
- Switzerland
- Turkey
- Ukraine

== Medal table ==
* Host nation (Spain)

Rank	Nation	Gold	Silver	Bronze	Total
1	Russia (RUS)	19	15	5	39
2	Great Britain (GBR)	9	10	9	28
3	Germany (GER)	5	7	2	14
4	Poland (POL)	5	2	3	10
5	Italy (ITA)	4	6	9	19
6	Spain (ESP)*	4	6	0	10
7	Hungary (HUN)	4	3	4	11
8	Ukraine (UKR)	4	3	1	8
9	Sweden (SWE)	4	0	3	7
10	Georgia (GEO)	4	0	2	6
11	France (FRA)	3	7	12	22
12	Belarus (BLR)	3	2	4	9
13	Romania (ROU)	2	3	6	11
14	Netherlands (NED)	2	3	5	10
15	Finland (FIN)	2	2	4	8
16	Croatia (CRO)	2	1	5	8
17	Yugoslavia (FRY)	2	1	2	5
18	Bulgaria (BUL)	2	1	1	4
19	Israel (ISR)	2	0	1	3
20	Slovenia (SLO)	1	4	2	7
21	Switzerland (SUI)	1	3	2	6
22	Latvia (LAT)	1	0	1	2
22	Portugal (POR)	1	0	1	2
24	Ireland (IRL)	1	0	0	1
24	Luxembourg (LUX)	1	0	0	1
24	Moldova (MDA)	1	0	0	1
24	Norway (NOR)	1	0	0	1
28	Belgium (BEL)	0	5	6	11
29	Czech Republic (CZE)	0	3	1	4
30	Azerbaijan (AZE)	0	2	2	4
31	Lithuania (LTU)	0	1	2	3
32	Austria (AUT)	0	0	4	4
32	Slovakia (SVK)	0	0	4	4
34	Armenia (ARM)	0	0	1	1
Totals (34 entries)		90	90	104	284
