= Short-track speed skating at the 2019 European Youth Olympic Winter Festival =

Short track speed skating at the 2019 European Youth Olympic Winter Festival
- Venue: Skenderija Hall
- Location: Sarajevo, Bosnia and Herzegovina
- Date: 11–15 February
- Website: eyof2019.net

Location in Bosnia and Herzegovina

Short track speed skating at the 2019 European Youth Olympic Winter Festival was held from 11 to 15 February at Skenderija Hall in Sarajevo, Bosnia and Herzegovina.

== Competition schedule ==
Sessions that included the event finals are shown in bold.

Date	Time	Event
11 February	10:05	**Girls' 1500 m**
11 February	10:05	**Boys' 1500 m**
11 February	12:40	Mixed 3000 m relay
12 February	10:05	**Girls' 500 m**
12 February	10:05	**Boys' 500 m**
12 February	12:35	Mixed 3000 m relay
15 February	11:05	**Girls' 1000 m**
15 February	11:05	**Boys' 1000 m**
15 February	14:05	**Mixed 3000 m relay**
Source: All times are (UTC+1)

== Medal summary ==
=== Medal table ===
Rank	Nation	Gold	Silver	Bronze	Total
1	Hungary (HUN)	3	0	2	5
2	Slovakia (SVK)	2	2	0	4
3	Poland (POL)	1	1	1	3
4	Italy (ITA)	1	1	0	2
5	Russia (RUS)	0	2	0	2
6	Turkey (TUR)	0	1	1	2
7	Netherlands (NED)	0	0	2	2
8	Belarus (BLR)	0	0	1	1
Totals (8 entries)		7	7	7	21

=== Boys' events ===
Event	Gold		Silver		Bronze	
500 m	Mateusz Krzemiński; Poland	42.446	Furkan Akar; Turkey	42.577	Balázs Bontovics; Hungary	54.129
1000 m	Attila Talabos; Hungary	1:36.676	Vladimir Balbekov; Russia	1:37.073	Balázs Bontovics; Hungary	1:37.436
1500 m	Attila Talabos; Hungary	2:24.975	Vladimir Balbekov; Russia	2:25.074	Furkan Akar; Turkey	2:25.331

=== Girls' events ===
Event	Gold		Silver		Bronze	
500 m	Petra Rusnáková; Slovakia	44.804	Lucia Filipová; Slovakia	45.045	Magdalena Zych; Poland	45.157
1000 m	Petra Rusnáková; Slovakia	1:38.566	Chiara Betti; Italy	1:39.662	Yana Dambrouskaya; Belarus	2:10.698
1500 m	Elisa Confortola; Italy	2:39.258	Petra Rusnáková; Slovakia	2:39.283	Michelle Velzeboer; Netherlands	2:40.240

=== Team event ===
Event	Gold		Silver		Bronze	
Mixed 3000 m relay	Hungary (HUN); Barbara Somogyi; Fanni Dobrán; Balázs Bontovics; Attila Talabos	4:18.084	Poland (POL); Hanna Sokołowska; Magdalena Zych; Mateusz Krzemiński; Mateusz Mikołajuk	4:18.168	Netherlands (NED); Yael Prenger; Michelle Velzeboer; Peter de Boer; Jesse Speijers	4:23.290
