= Tennis at the 2023 European Youth Summer Olympic Festival =

- Venue: Branik Tennis Club
- Date: 23–29 July

Tennis at the 2023 European Youth Summer Olympic Festival was held in Maribor, Slovenia, from 23 to 29 July 2023.

== Medal table ==
* Host nation (Slovenia)

Rank	Nation	Gold	Silver	Bronze	Total
1	Czech Republic	1	0	1	2
2	Italy	1	0	0	1
2	Poland	1	0	0	1
2	Slovakia	1	0	0	1
5	Romania	0	3	0	3
6	Austria	0	1	0	1
7	Portugal	0	0	1	1
7	Slovenia	0	0	1	1
7	Spain	0	0	1	1
Totals (9 entries)		4	4	4	12

== Medalists ==
Event	Gold	Silver	Bronze
Boys' singles	Vito Antonio Darderi; Italy	Thilo Behrmann; Austria	Svit Suljić; Slovenia
Boys' doubles	Antoni Kasperski; Jan Sadzik; Poland	Yannick Theodor Alexandrescou; Alejandro Berge Nourescu; Romania	Goncalo Da Rosa Castro; Salvador Monteiro; Portugal
Girls' singles	Julie Paštiková; Czech Republic	Giulia Safina Popa; Romania	Charo Esquiva Bañuls; Spain
Girls' doubles	Soňa Depešová; Mia Pohánková; Slovakia	Giulia Safina Popa; Alexia Ioana Tatu; Romania	Tereza Krejčová; Julie Paštiková; Czech Republic
