= Canoe slalom at the 2025 European Youth Summer Olympic Festival =

- Venue: Sport Center Matka
- Location: Skopje, North Macedonia
- Date: 24 July 2025

Canoe slalom at the 2025 European Youth Summer Olympic Festival held at the Sport Center Matka.

== Medal table ==
* Host nation (North Macedonia)

Rank	Nation	Gold	Silver	Bronze	Total
1	Poland	2	0	0	2
2	Czech Republic	1	0	1	2
3	France	1	0	0	1
4	Austria	0	1	0	1
4	Italy	0	1	0	1
4	Slovakia	0	1	0	1
4	Switzerland	0	1	0	1
8	Spain	0	0	2	2
9	Germany	0	0	1	1
Totals (9 entries)		4	4	4	12

== Medals summary ==
Event	Gold	Silver	Bronze
Boys
Slalom K-1	Marek Kulczycki; Poland	Max Steinbrenner; Austria	Johann Schmidt; Germany
Slalom C-1	Léo Royé; France	Dennis Fina; Italy	Matěj Kvapil; Czech Republic
Girls
Slalom K-1	Barbora Ondráčková; Czech Republic	Zara Zahorská; Slovakia	Ainhoa Segura; Spain
Slalom C-1	Patrycja Iwaniec; Poland	Florance Moinian; Switzerland	Ainhoa Segura; Spain
