= Cycling at the 2015 European Youth Summer Olympic Festival =

Cycling at the 2015 European Youth Summer Olympic Festival

== Medal summary ==
=== Medal table ===
Rank	Nation	Gold	Silver	Bronze	Total
1	Italy	2	0	0	2
2	Denmark	1	1	0	2
2	Switzerland	1	1	0	2
4	France	0	1	1	2
5	Slovakia	0	1	0	1
6	Great Britain	0	0	3	3
Totals (6 entries)		4	4	4	12

=== Medal events ===
==== Boys ====
Event	Gold	Silver	Bronze
Road Race	Samuel Steiger Til (SUI)	Matus Stocek (SVK)	Alfred Wright (GBR)
Time Trial	Julius Johansen (DEN)	Samuel Steiger Til (SUI)	Florentin Lecamus (FRA)

==== Girls ====
Event	Gold	Silver	Bronze
Road Race	Letizia Paternoster (ITA)	Emma Cecilie Norsgaard (DEN)	Clara Copponi (FRA)
Time Trial	Elena Pirrone (ITA)	Clara Copponi (FRA)	Lauren Dolan (GBR)
