= Biathlon at the 2022 European Youth Olympic Winter Festival =

- Venue: Vuokatti Sport Biathlon Stadium
- Date: 22–25 March
- Website: eyof2022.fi

Biathlon at the 2022 European Youth Olympic Winter Festival was held from 22 to 25 March at Vuokatti Sport Biathlon Stadium in Vuokatti, Finland.

== Competition schedule ==
Date	Time	Event
22 March	12:40	Girls' sprint 6 km
22 March	15:20	Boys' sprint 7.5 km
24 March	10:00	Girls' individual 10 km
24 March	12:50	Boys' individual 12.5 km
25 March	10:00	Mixed relay
Source: All times are (UTC+2)

== Medal summary ==
=== Medal table ===
* Host nation (Finland)

Rank	Nation	Gold	Silver	Bronze	Total
1	France (FRA)	2	0	2	4
2	Slovenia (SLO)	1	1	1	3
3	Czech Republic (CZE)	1	1	0	2
3	Sweden (SWE)	1	1	0	2
5	Poland (POL)	0	1	1	2
6	Italy (ITA)	0	1	0	1
7	Slovakia (SVK)	0	0	1	1
Totals (7 entries)		5	5	5	15

=== Boys' events ===
Event	Gold		Silver		Bronze	
7.5 km sprint	Petr Hák; Czech Republic	19:57.4 (0+0)	Mattia Piller Hoffer; Italy	20:21.8 (0+0)	Lou Thiévent; France	20:22.2 (0+1)
12.5 km individual	Lou Thiévent; France	36:34.5 (1+1+0+0)	Konrad Badacz; Poland	36:59.0 (0+1+0+1)	Jakub Borguľa; Slovakia	37:06.5 (0+2+0+0)

=== Girls' events ===
Event	Gold		Silver		Bronze	
6 km sprint	Sara Andersson; Sweden	17:08.9 (0+1)	Klara Vindišar; Slovenia	17:44.0 (0+1)	Kaja Zorč; Slovenia	17:49.0 (0+0)
10 km individual	Lena Repinc; Slovenia	31:34.7 (1+0+0+0)	Sara Andersson; Sweden	31:44.1 (0+1+0+2)	Amandine Mengin; France	31:47.6 (0+0+0+0)

=== Mixed event ===
Event	Gold		Silver		Bronze	
Mixed relay	France; Amandine Mengin; Violette Bony; Gaëtan Paturel; Lou Thiévent	1:12:27.8	Czech Republic; Kateřina Pavlů; Katerina Gotvaldová; Daniel Malušek; Petr Hák	1:12:50.6	Poland; Anna Nędza-Kubiniec; Barbara Skrobiszewska; Fabian Suchodolski; Konrad Badacz	1:13:26.9
