= Ice hockey at the 2025 European Youth Olympic Winter Festival =

- Location: Tbilisi, Georgia
- Date: 6–16 February 2025
- Website: bakuriani2025.sporteurope.org

Champions
- Men: Switzerland (2)
- Women: Czechia (3)

Ice hockey at the 2025 European Youth Olympic Winter Festival comprised two ice hockey tournaments – a boys' tournament and a girls' tournament – during the Bakuriani 2025 edition of the European Youth Olympic Festival (EYOF). Both tournaments were held at the Tbilisi Ice Arena in Tbilisi, Georgia. The girls' tournament was played during 6 to 10 February, and the boys' tournament was played during 12 to 16 February.

== Medal summary ==
=== Medal table ===
* Host nation (Georgia)

Rank	Nation	Gold	Silver	Bronze	Total
1	Czechia	1	0	1	2
2	Switzerland	1	0	0	1
3	Slovakia	0	1	1	2
4	Finland	0	1	0	1
Totals (4 entries)		2	2	2	6

=== Medalists ===
Event	Gold	Silver	Bronze
Girls	Czechia; Karolína Bojdová; Lili Chmelařová; Dana Březinová; Anna Dvořáková; Veronika Filipi; Stella Gabrielová; Amálie Hlávková; Ellen Jarabková; Amálie Karásková; Alena Luxemburková; Klára Martinková; Dominika Mertlová; Adéla Mynaříková; Natálie Pitelová; Ester Rosenbaumová; Rozálie Šalé; Kristýna Šimčíková; Lucie Šindelářová; Natálie Veselá; Natálie Vlková	Finland; Kiia Arvola; Iida Elomaa; Katri Huotari; Minea Huovinen; Katariina Junnila; Yenna Kolmonen; Fanny Kyrkkö; Viola Kärkkäinen; Emmi Loponen; Mette Miettinen; Daria Molchun; Aino Määttänen; Marta Niemi; Jatta Ojala; Aada Pohjola; Emma Rissanen; Viivi Ruonakoski; Annika Salminen; Netta Siitonen; Tinja Tapani	Slovakia; Nina Čellárová; Natália Gerő; Sofia Hajnalová; Alexandra Hirjaková; Karin Hrušková; Gréta Konrádová; Michaela Letaši; Laura Lilly Lipnická; Lucia Luptáková; Dominika Miškovičová; Emma Plvanová; Aurélia Račák; Nina Roštecká; Nina Rybovičová; Sofia Sklenková; Sofia Stráňovská; Nina Ševčíková; Nina Šimová; Daniela Šufliarská; Nela Tischlerová
Boys	Switzerland; Raphaël Achermann; Ryan Bizzozero; Niccolò Castiglioni; Jan Daron; Liam Dubé; Sol Liam Flia Fueter; Nico Keller; Sven Kriesi; Elia Liniger; Loïc Mukuna; Tim Münger; Roméo Pralong; Tadeo Prosser; Moritz Rüegsegger; Maxime Sauthier; Pascal Schürmann; Wsewolod Schwanemann; Vito Thoma; Dennis van Gessel; Yannis Zambelli	Slovakia; Matej Bereš; Oliver Botka; Denis Čelko; Roderik Černák; Ján Čurlej; Juraj Jonas Ďurčo; Jakub Husár; Samuel Hybský; Filip Kovalčík; Kristián Macák; Ivan Matta; Adam Obušek; Marko Požgay; Kristián Rezničák; Matej Stankoven; Jakub Syrný; Maxim Šimko; Tomáš Šromovský; Denis Tóth; Matúš Válek	Czechia; Tadeáš Chalupa; Dominik Drábek; Daniel Filip; Michal Hartl; Daniel Helis; Adam Hynek; Robin Kavan; Denis Korhoň; Matěj Kučera; Adam Němec; Dominik Novák; Václav Osvald; Simon Pešout; Antonín Riedl; Štěpán Stejskal; Jaroslav Šedivý; Šimon Šejc; Denis Viedemann; Kryštof Vrbata; Tomáš Zikmund

== Match officials ==
Four referees and ten linesmen were selected for the tournaments.

Referees

- (Finland) Maria Hauhia
- (Sweden) Oscar Niklasson
- (Finland) Eetu Rasalahti
- (Germany) Harriet Weegh

Linesmen

- (Italy) Anna Carissimi
- (Sweden) William Henriksson
- (Switzerland) Baptiste Humair
- (Ukraine) Nikita Kochura
- (Austria) Manuela Lenhart
- (Slovakia) Eva Mária Moleková
- (Czech Republic) Jaroslav Peluha
- (Switzerland) Jennifer Salzmann
- (Slovakia) Jozef Tichý
- (Slovakia) Miroslav Tvrdoň

== Girls' tournament ==
2025 European Youth Olympic Winter Festival – Girls' ice hockey tournament
Tournament details
- Host country: Georgia
- Venue: 1 (in 1 host city)
- Dates: 6–10 February 2025
- Teams: 6

Final positions
- Champions: Czechia (3rd title)
- Runners-up: Finland
- Third place: Slovakia
- Fourth place: Sweden

Tournament statistics
- Games played: 11
- Goals scored: 109 (9.91 per game)
- Scoring leader: (Sweden) Ebba Hesselvall (13 points)

The girls' ice hockey tournament at the 2025 European Youth Olympic Winter Festival was held at Tbilisi Ice Arena in Tbilisi, Georgia during 6 to 10 February 2025. It was the third girls' ice hockey tournament to be played as part of a European Youth Olympic Winter Festival, following the inaugural tournament at Vuokatti 2022 and the tournament at Friuli-Venezia Giulia 2023.

Only players born in either 2009 or 2010 were eligible to compete in the tournament and, therefore, most players were fourteen or fifteen years old at the start of the tournament.

=== Preliminary round ===
==== Group A ====
Standings

Pos	Team	Pld	W	OTW	OTL	L	GF	GA	GD	Pts	Qualification
1	Czechia	2	2	0	0	0	10	0	+10	6	Semifinals
2	Slovakia	2	0	1	0	1	4	7	−3	2	Semifinals
3	Switzerland	2	0	0	1	1	3	10	−7	1	Fifth place game

Updated to match(es) played on 8 February 2025. Source: EYOF 2025

Results

All times are Georgia Time (UTC+4)

Abbreviations: PP1 = Power play goal (+1 advantage); EA = Extra attacker

6 February 2025; 14:30	Czechia	4–0 (3–0, 1–0, 0–0)	Slovakia	Tbilisi Ice Arena, Tbilisi

Stella Gabrielová
Goalies
Sofia Hajnalová
Referee:
(Finland) Maria Hauhia
Linesmen:
(Italy) Anna Carissimi
(Sweden) William Henriksson

Šindelářová (Veselá) – 02:33	1–0
Luxemburková – PP1 – 09:41	2–0
Mynaříková – 14:50	3–0
Jarabková (Šindelářová) – 34:53	4–0

20 min
Penalties
8 min
15
Shots
4

7 February 2025; 14:30	Switzerland	0–6 (0–4, 0–2, 0–0)	Czechia	Tbilisi Ice Arena, Tbilisi

Norina Schrupkowski
Lara Hug
Goalies
Lili Chmelařová
Referee:
(Finland) Eetu Rasalahti
Linesmen:
(Italy) Anna Carissimi
(Czech Republic) Jaroslav Peluha

0–1	01:57 – Březinová (Mynaříková)
0–2	04:09 – PP1 – Březinová (Hlávková, Vlková)
0–3	11:28 – Rosenbaumová (Mynaříková)
0–4	19:42 – Jarabková (Vlková)
0–5	26:33 – PP1 – Šalé (Bojdová)
0–6	32:27 – PP1 – Karásková (Jarabková, Rosenbaumová)

12 min
Penalties
4 min
5
Shots
41

8 February 2025; 14:30	Slovakia	4–3 OT (1–1, 1–2, 1–0) (OT: 1–0)	Switzerland	Tbilisi Ice Arena, Tbilisi

Daniela Šufliarská
Sofia Hajnalová
Goalies
Lara Hug
Referee:
(Finland) Maria Hauhia
Linesmen:
(Austria) Manuela Lenhart
(Czech Republic) Jaroslav Peluha

Gerő (Plvanová, Hrušková) – PP1 – 08:01	1–0
	1–1	08:52 – PP1 – A. Rohner
	1–2	23:40 – Mettler (Baker)
	1–3	36:04 – Vauclair (Huwyler, Baker)
Tischlerová (Plvanová, Luptáková) – 39:42	2–3
Konrádová (Hirjaková, Plvanová) – EA – 57:50	3–3
Tischlerová – 60:15	4–3

4 min
Penalties
6 min
16
Shots
7

==== Group B ====
Standings

Pos	Team	Pld	W	OTW	OTL	L	GF	GA	GD	Pts	Qualification
1	Finland	2	2	0	0	0	23	2	+21	6	Semifinals
2	Sweden	2	1	0	0	1	22	7	+15	3	Semifinals
3	Italy	2	0	0	0	2	2	38	−36	0	Fifth place game

Updated to match(es) played on 7 February 2025. Source: EYOF 2025

Results

All times are Georgia Time (UTC+4)

Abbreviations: PP1 = Power play goal (+1 advantage); PP2 = Power play goal (+2 advantage); SH1 = Short handed goal (–1 advantage)

6 February 2025; 18:00	Finland	5–2 (0–0, 4–0, 1–2)	Sweden	Tbilisi Ice Arena, Tbilisi

Aino Määttänen
Goalies
Alva Persson
Referee:
(Germany) Harriet Weegh
Linesmen:
(Switzerland) Baptiste Humair
(Austria) Manuela Lenhart

Loponen (Tapani, Kolmonen) – 31:02	1–0
Ruonakoski (Kärkkäinen) – 34:27	2–0
Siitonen (Junnila, Ruonakoski) – PP1 – 36:15	3–0
Kärkkäinen (Siitonen, Tapani) – 38:38	4–0
	4–1	45:25 – PP1 – Hesselvall (Holmberg)
	4–2	51:19 – Fernström (Lindberg, Torsson)
Siitonen (Arvola) – 59:49	5–2

6 min
Penalties
8 min
32
Shots
17

7 February 2025; 19:30	Italy	0–18 (0–6, 0–7, 0–5)	Finland	Tbilisi Ice Arena, Tbilisi

Veronica Montanino
Katia Polloni
Goalies
Annika Salminen
Referee:
(Sweden) Oscar Niklasson
Linesmen:
(Sweden) William Henriksson
(Switzerland) Jennifer Salzmann

0–1	08:49 – Pohjola (Junnila)
0–2	10:56 – Huotari (Niemi)
0–3	11:15 – Arvola
0–4	15:19 – PP1 – Tapani
0–5	16:51 – Tapani (Huotari)
0–6	19:30 – PP1 – Junnila
0–7	20:14 – Kyrkkö (Junnila, Arvola)
0–8	21:03 – Junnila (Arvola)
0–9	23:57 – Tapani (Arvola, Huovinen)
0–10	24:21 – Huovinen (Miettinen)
0–11	25:55 – Arvola (Miettinen, Loponen)
0–12	29:13 – Kärkkäinen
0–13	33:45 – Kolmonen
0–14	43:09 – Tapani (Loponen)
0–15	48:00 – Ojala (Niemi)
0–16	48:27 – Kolmonen (Tapani, Loponen)
0–17	54:34 – Pohjala (Ojala)
0–18	58:09 – Molchun

8 min
Penalties
2 min
0
Shots
40

8 February 2025; 18:00	Sweden	20–2 (10–0, 6–2, 4–0)	Italy	Tbilisi Ice Arena, Tbilisi

Mathilda Bak
Goalies
Veronica Montanino
Katia Polloni
Referee:
(Germany) Harriet Weegh
Linesmen:
(Switzerland) Jennifer Salzmann
(Slovakia) Miroslav Tvrdoň

Stäring (Hesselvall) – 00:28	1–0
Hesselvall – PP1 – 04:00	2–0
Källström (Linden, Wetter) – 04:52	3–0
Linden (Källström, Johnson) – 08:22	4–0
Källström (Johnson, Linden) – 11:58	5–0
Hesselvall (Nilson, Nordqvist) – 14:00	6–0
Fernström (Lindberg, Nilson) – 14:16	7–0
Stäring (Torsson, Hesselvall) – 16:26	8–0
Johansson (Sandberg, Johnson) – 17:59	9–0
Holmberg (Johnson, Fernström) – PP1 – 19:34	10–0
Hesselvall (Stäring) – 20:37	11–0
Nilson (Stålnacke) – 21:13	12–0
	12–1	27:07 – Dalle Mulle
Nilson (Hesselvall, Torsson) – 31:39	13–1
Sandberg (Johansson, Bondesson) – 32:37	14–1
Hesselvall (Stäring, Torsson) – 37:47	15–1
Johansson (Lindberg) – SH1 – 38:39	16–1
	16–2	39:04 – PP2 – Todesco (Pinti, Verderame)
Nordqvist (Sandberg, Karlström) – 46:45	17–2
Moberg (Stålnacke) – 49:50	18–2
Johansson (Sandberg, Johnson) – 54:43	19–2
Källström (Linden, Stålnacke) – 55:54	20–2

12 min
Penalties
4 min
54
Shots
6

=== Placement matches ===
All times are Georgia Time (UTC+4)

Abbreviations: PP1 = Power play goal (+1 advantage); SH1 = Short handed goal (–1 advantage); EN = Empty net goal

==== Fifth place game ====
10 February 2025; 11:00	Switzerland	8–0 (4–0, 1–0, 3–0)	Italy	Tbilisi Ice Arena, Tbilisi

Lara Hug
Norina Schrupkowski
Goalies
Veronica Montanino
Referee:
(Sweden) Oscar Niklasson
Linesmen:
(Italy) Anna Carissimi
(Czech Republic) Jaroslav Peluha

Fausch (Baker, Mattler) – 00:35	1–0
Fausch (Huwyler) – PP1 – 04:33	2–0
Huwyler (Leuenberger) – 11:45	3–0
Leuenberger (Frolik) – 11:57	4–0
Berger (M. Rohner) – PP1 – 33:38	5–0
Frolik (Baker) – PP1 – 45:17	6–0
Merkofer – SH1 – 55:06	7–0
Huwyler – 59:21	8–0

6 min
Penalties
8 min
39
Shots
8

==== Semifinals ====
9 February 2025; 10:00	Czechia	10–2 (4–0, 3–2, 3–0)	Sweden	Tbilisi Ice Arena, Tbilisi

Lili Chmelařová
Goalies
Alva Persson
Mathilda Bak
Referee:
(Finland) Eetu Rasalahti
Linesmen:
(Switzerland) Baptiste Humair
(Austria) Manuela Lenhart

Jarabková (Martinková) – 03:33	1–0
Šindelářová – PP1 – 05:38	2–0
Rosenbaumová – 17:37	3–0
Mynaříková (Jarabková) – 17:53	4–0
Filipi (Mynaříková, Jarabková) – 24:54	5–0
Veselá (Filipi) – 31:02	6–0
	6–1	32:07 – PP1 – Hesselvall (Fernström)
	6–2	32:40 – PP1 – Hesselvall (Nilson)
Rosenbaumová (Jarabková, Šindelářová) – PP1 – 35:51	7–2
Rosenbaumová (Mynaříková) – 40:36	8–2
Šalé (Karásková) – 41:27	9–2
Rosenbaumová (Šindelářová) – 59:23	10–2

8 min
Penalties
12 min
39
Shots
23

9 February 2025; 14:30	Finland	3–2 OT (0–0, 1–2, 1–0) (OT: 1–0)	Slovakia	Tbilisi Ice Arena, Tbilisi

Aino Määttänen
Goalies
Sofia Hajnalová
Referee:
(Germany) Harriet Weegh
Linesmen:
(Italy) Anna Carissimi
(Slovakia) Miroslav Tvrdoň

Junnila (Arvola, Huovinen) – 28:43	1–0
	1–1	32:43 – PP1 – Letaši (Ševčíková, Hrušková)
	1–2	33:15 – Čellárová (Luptáková)
Loponen (Junnila, Kyrkkö) – 57:17	2–2
Kolmonen (Ruonakoski) – 61:11	3–2

4 min
Penalties
2 min
22
Shots
14

==== Bronze medal game ====
10 February 2025; 14:30	Sweden	6–7 OT (2–1, 1–4, 3–1) (OT: 0–1)	Slovakia	Tbilisi Ice Arena, Tbilisi

Alva Persson
Goalies
Sofia Hajnalová
Referee:
(Finland) Maria Hauhia
Linesmen:
(Austria) Manuela Lenhart
(Slovakia) Miroslav Tvrdoň

	0–1	08:58 – PP1 – Gerő (Plvanová, Letaši)
Lindén (Holmberg) – 18:36	1–1
Fernström (Johansson, Hesselvall) – 19:54	2–1
	2–2	20:43 – PP1 – Konrádová (Tischlerová, Hirjaková)
	2–3	22:42 – PP1 – Hrušková (Letaši, Gerő)
	2–4	28:53 – Ševčíková (Hrušková)
Fernström (Hesselvall) – 29:42	3–4
	3–5	33:01 – Plvanová (Rybovičová)
Fernström (Hesselvall) – PP1 – 40:46	4–5
Nilson (Källström) – 42:14	5–5
Lindberg – 47:06	6–5
	6–6	52:37 – PP1 – Plvanová (Rybovičová)
	6–7	62:02 – Gerő

16 min
Penalties
10 min
27
Shots
22

==== Gold medal game ====
10 February 2025; 18:00	Czechia	5–2 (0–0, 3–1, 2–1)	Finland	Tbilisi Ice Arena, Tbilisi

Lili Chmelařová
Goalies
Aino Määttänen
Referee:
(Germany) Harriet Weegh
Linesmen:
(Sweden) William Henriksson
(Switzerland) Jennifer Salzmann

Luxemburková (Bojdová, Šalé) – PP1 – 21:38	1–0
	1–1	22:38 – Loponen (Tapani, Kolmonen)
Březinová (Šalé, Karásková) – 28:11	2–1
Šindelářová (Mynaříková, Rosenbaumová) – 33:18	3–1
	3–2	41:36 – PP1 – Siitonen (Kärkkäinen)
Bojdová (Mertlová, Luxemburková) – 47:52	4–2
Mynaříková – EN – 58:31	5–2

6 min
Penalties
8 min
27
Shots
21

=== Statistics ===
==== Scoring leaders ====
List shows players with the highest cumulative point totals from the preliminary round and placement matches combines, sorted by points, then goals.

GP = Games played; G = Goals; A = Assists; Pts = Points; PIM = Penalties in minutes; POS = Position

Rank		Player	GP	G	A	Pts	PIM	POS
1	(Sweden)	Ebba Hesselvall	4	7	6	13	2	F
2	(Finland)	Tinja Tapani	4	4	4	8	0	F
3	(Czech Republic)	Ellen Jarabková	4	3	5	8	0	D
3	(Czech Republic)	Adéla Mynaříková	4	3	5	8	2	F
5	(Sweden)	Filipa Fernström	4	5	2	7	4	F
5	(Czech Republic)	Ester Skalová-Rosenbaumová	4	5	2	7	2	F
7	(Finland)	Katariina Junnila	4	3	4	7	2	D
8	(Finland)	Kiia Arvola	4	2	5	7	0	F
9	(Finland)	Emmi Loponen	4	3	3	6	4	F
9	(Sweden)	Alice Nilson	4	3	3	6	10	F
9	(Czech Republic)	Lucie Šindelářová	4	3	3	6	6	F

Emma Plvanová was the point leader for Slovakia, amassing six points on two goals and four assists across four games. With three goals in four games, Natália Gerő led Slovakia in goals scored.

Laelia Huwyler led the Swiss team in point scoring, collecting four points on two goals and two assists across two games played (she did not dress for Switzerland's first game in the group round). Team captain Jil May Baker also reached four points, notching four assists in three games played.

Cristel Dalle Mulle and captain Georgia Todesco were the only goal scorers for Italy, each tallying one goal.

=== Rosters ===
Team	Roster
Czechia	Goaltenders: Lili Chmelařová, Stella Gabrielová; Defensemen: Karolína Bojdová, Veronika Filipi, Amálie Hlávková, Ellen Jarabková (C), Alena Luxemburková, Klára Martinková, Natálie Veselá, Natálie Vlková; Forwards: Dana Březinová, Anna Dvořáková, Amálie Karásková, Dominika Mertlová, Adéla Mynaříková, Natálie Pitelová, Ester Rosenbaumová (A), Rozálie Šalé, Kristýna Šimčíková, Lucie Šindelářová (A); Head coach: Jan Lucák; Assistant coach: Karolína Erbanová, Dalimil Svoboda
Finland	Goaltenders: Aino Määttänen, Annika Salminen; Defensemen: Iida Elomaa, Katariina Junnila, Fanny Kyrkkö, Viola Kärkkäinen (A), Mette Miettinen, Viivi Ruonakoski (A); Forwards: Kiia Arvola, Katri Huotari, Minea Huovinen, Yenna Kolmonen, Emmi Loponen, Daria Molchun, Marta Niemi, Jatta Ojala, Aada Pohjola, Emma Rissanen, Netta Siitonen, Tinja Tapani (C); Head coach: Mira Kuisma; Assistant coaches: Juho Lehto, Juuso Nieminen
Italy	Goaltenders: Veronica Montanino, Katia Polloni; Defensemen: Angelica Betta, Emma Durand, Riana Holzknecht, Eliana Nobile (A), Arianna Novati (A), Eleonora Pinti, Xenia Watschinger; Forwards: Nicole Belli, Cristel Dalle Mulle, Stella Dal Pont, Emma Grezziani, Emma Palatini, Nicole Polloni, Ginevra Rancoita, Atena Raviscioni, Georgia Todesco (C), Emma Verderame; Head coach: Massimo Fedrizzi; Assistant coach: Luca Giacomuzzi
Slovakia	Goaltenders: Sofia Hajnalová, Daniela Šufliarská; Defensemen: Karin Hrušková, Gréta Konrádová, Michaela Letaši, Laura Lilly Lipnická, Aurélia Račák, Nela Tischlerová (C); Forwards: Nina Čellárová (A), Natália Gerő (A), Alexandra Hirjaková, Lucia Luptáková, Dominika Miškovičová, Emma Plvanová, Dominika Miškovičová, Nina Roštecká, Nina Rybovičová, Sofia Sklenková, Sofia Stráňovská, Nina Ševčíková, Nina Šimová; Head coach: Robert Marton; Assistant coach: Paula Cagáňová, Daniela Zuziaková (goaltender)
Sweden	Goaltenders: Mathilda Bak, Alva Persson; Defensemen: Nike Bondesson, Emma Holmberg, Emma Johnson (C), Lova Karlström, Svea Nordqvist, Nova Stålnacke; Forwards: Filippa Fernström, Ebba Hesselvall (A), Greta Johansson, Agnes Källström, Ida Lindberg, Selma Lindén, Alice Moberg (A), Alice Nilson, Ebba Sandberg, Maja Stäring, Lova Torsson, Julia Wetter; Head coach: Morgan Johansson; Assistant coach: Erika Grahm, Maria Omberg (goaltender)
Switzerland	Goaltenders: Lara Hug, Norina Schrupkowski; Defensemen: Nora Berger, Shayna Merkofer, Anaïs Rohner, Maiko Julia Rösti, Maelia Vauclair, Sabrina Wälti; Forwards: Chloé Anderton, Jil May Baker (C), Alicia Skye Fausch (A), Enya Frolik, Laelia Huwyler, Joana Leuenberger, Sarah Mettler, Noemi Molag, Léa Péclard, Alix Pialat, Maëlle Rohner, Marlen Wälti (A); Head coach: Céline Abgottspon; Assistant coach: Iris Sandra Müller, Andreas Ellenberger (goaltender)

== Boys' tournament ==
2025 European Youth Olympic Winter Festival – Boys' ice hockey tournament
Tournament details
- Host country: Georgia
- Venue: 1 (in 1 host city)
- Dates: 12–16 February 2025
- Teams: 6

Final positions
- Champions: Switzerland
- Runners-up: Slovakia
- Third place: Czechia
- Fourth place: Ukraine

Tournament statistics
- Games played: 11

The boys' ice hockey tournament at the 2025 European Youth Olympic Winter Festival was held at the Tbilisi Ice Arena in Tbilisi, Georgia during 12 to 16 February 2025. It was the fifteenth boys' ice hockey tournament to be played as part of a European Youth Olympic Winter Festival, since the sport's introduction to the programme at the 1997 European Youth Olympic Winter Days.

Only players born in either 2008 or 2009 were eligible to compete in the tournament and, therefore, most players were 15 or 16 years old at the start of the tournament.

=== Preliminary round ===
==== Group A ====
Standings

Pos	Team	Pld	W	OTW	OTL	L	GF	GA	GD	Pts	Qualification
1	Slovakia	2	2	0	0	0	10	6	+4	6	Semifinals
2	Ukraine	2	1	0	0	1	9	11	−2	3	Semifinals
3	Latvia	2	0	0	0	2	6	8	−2	0	Fifth place game

Source: EYOF 2025

Results

12 February 2025; 14:30	Slovakia	3–2 (1–1, 2–0, 0–1)	Latvia	Tbilisi Ice Arena, Tbilisi

Denis Čelko	Goalies	Patriks Plūmiņš	Referee: (Sweden) Oscar Niklasson; Linesmen: (Switzerland) Baptiste Humair (Austria) Manuela Lenhart
10 min	Penalties	20 min	Referee: (Sweden) Oscar Niklasson; Linesmen: (Switzerland) Baptiste Humair (Austria) Manuela Lenhart
26	Shots	24	Referee: (Sweden) Oscar Niklasson; Linesmen: (Switzerland) Baptiste Humair (Austria) Manuela Lenhart

13 February 2025; 14:30	Ukraine	4–7 (1–1, 1–2, 2–4)	Slovakia	Tbilisi Ice Arena, Tbilisi

Illia Bobrov	Goalies	Jakub Husár	Referees: (Finland) Eetu Rasalahti (Germany) Harriet Weegh; Linesmen: (Italy) Anna Carissimi (Switzerland) Baptiste Humair
8 min	Penalties	10 min	Referees: (Finland) Eetu Rasalahti (Germany) Harriet Weegh; Linesmen: (Italy) Anna Carissimi (Switzerland) Baptiste Humair
24	Shots	34	Referees: (Finland) Eetu Rasalahti (Germany) Harriet Weegh; Linesmen: (Italy) Anna Carissimi (Switzerland) Baptiste Humair

14 February 2025; 14:30	Latvia	4–5 (2–1, 1–2, 1–2)	Ukraine	Tbilisi Ice Arena, Tbilisi

Tomass Rutulis	Goalies	Illia Bobrov	Referees: (Finland) Eetu Rasalahti (Germany) Harriet Weegh; Linesmen: (Switzerland) Baptiste Humair (Czech Republic) Jaroslav Peluha
31 min	Penalties	8 min	Referees: (Finland) Eetu Rasalahti (Germany) Harriet Weegh; Linesmen: (Switzerland) Baptiste Humair (Czech Republic) Jaroslav Peluha
30	Shots	33	Referees: (Finland) Eetu Rasalahti (Germany) Harriet Weegh; Linesmen: (Switzerland) Baptiste Humair (Czech Republic) Jaroslav Peluha

==== Group B ====
Standings

Pos	Team	Pld	W	OTW	OTL	L	GF	GA	GD	Pts	Qualification
1	Switzerland	2	1	0	0	1	14	8	+6	3	Semifinals
2	(Czech Republic) Czechia	2	1	0	0	1	6	7	−1	3	Semifinals
3	Austria	2	1	0	0	1	9	14	−5	3	Fifth place game

Source: EYOF 2025

Results

12 February 2025; 18:00	Czechia	4–2 (0–2, 1–0, 3–0)	Switzerland	Tbilisi Ice Arena, Tbilisi

Simon Pešout	Goalies	Yannis Zambelli	Referee: (Finland) Eetu Rasalahti; Linesmen: (Switzerland) Jennifer Salzmann (Slovakia) Miroslav Tvrdoň
16 min	Penalties	4 min	Referee: (Finland) Eetu Rasalahti; Linesmen: (Switzerland) Jennifer Salzmann (Slovakia) Miroslav Tvrdoň
19	Shots	18	Referee: (Finland) Eetu Rasalahti; Linesmen: (Switzerland) Jennifer Salzmann (Slovakia) Miroslav Tvrdoň

13 February 2025; 18:00	Austria	5–2 (2–1, 0–0, 3–1)	Czechia	Tbilisi Ice Arena, Tbilisi

Martin Haim	Goalies	Václav Osvald	Referees: (Finland) Maria Hauhia (Sweden) Oscar Niklasson; Linesmen: (Czech Republic) Jaroslav Peluha (Switzerland) Jennifer Salzmann
20 min	Penalties	10 min	Referees: (Finland) Maria Hauhia (Sweden) Oscar Niklasson; Linesmen: (Czech Republic) Jaroslav Peluha (Switzerland) Jennifer Salzmann
29	Shots	26	Referees: (Finland) Maria Hauhia (Sweden) Oscar Niklasson; Linesmen: (Czech Republic) Jaroslav Peluha (Switzerland) Jennifer Salzmann

14 February 2025; 18:00	Switzerland	12–4 (5–2, 3–2, 4–0)	Austria	Tbilisi Ice Arena, Tbilisi

Nico Keller	Goalies	Kilian Streußnig; Martin Haim	Referees: (Finland) Maria Hauhia (Sweden) Oscar Niklasson; Linesmen: (Sweden) William Henriksson (Switzerland) Jennifer Salzmann
37 min	Penalties	10 min	Referees: (Finland) Maria Hauhia (Sweden) Oscar Niklasson; Linesmen: (Sweden) William Henriksson (Switzerland) Jennifer Salzmann
37	Shots	19	Referees: (Finland) Maria Hauhia (Sweden) Oscar Niklasson; Linesmen: (Sweden) William Henriksson (Switzerland) Jennifer Salzmann

=== Placement matches ===
All times are Georgia Time (UTC+4)

Abbreviations: PP1 = Power play goal (+1 advantage); PP2 = Power play goal (+2 advantage); SH1 = Short handed goal (–1 advantage)

==== Fifth place game ====
15 February 2025; 11:00	Austria	1–4 (0–1, 0–1, 1–2)	Latvia	Tbilisi Ice Arena, Tbilisi

Martin Haim
Goalies
Patriks Plūmiņš
Referee:
(Sweden) Oscar Niklasson
Linesmen:
(Italy) Anna Carissimi
(Sweden) William Henriksson

	0–1	00:54 – Obuks (Mališevs, Grundmanis)
	0–2	27:26 – PP1 – Tarvids (Bērzkalns, Obuks)
	0–3	44:58 – PP2 – Tarvids (Obuks)
	0–4	54:11 – Jukāms (Belovs)
Oschgan (Koschek) – 54:38	1–4

18 min
Penalties
14 min
22
Shots
26

==== Semifinals ====
15 February 2025; 14:30	Slovakia	7–1 (4–0, 3–1, 0–0)	Czechia	Tbilisi Ice Arena, Tbilisi

Denis Čelko
Jakub Husár
Goalies
Simon Pešout
Václav Osvald
Referees:
(Finland) Eetu Rasalahti
(Germany) Harriet Weegh
Linesmen:
(Czech Republic) Jaroslav Peluha
(Slovakia) Miroslav Tvrdoň

Matta (Stankoven, Syrný) – 00:42	1–0
Bereš (Hybský, Černák) – PP1 – 07:56	2–0
Rezničák (Matta) – 16:01	3–0
Bereš (Rezničák, Černák) – PP1 – 18:51	4–0
Rezničák (Matta, Botka) – 21:24	5–0
Rezničák (Hybský, Černák) – 25:22	6–0
Hybský (Matta, Černák) – PP1 – 36:19	7–0
	7–1	36:48 – Viedemann (Němec, Kavan)

4 min
Penalties
14 min
20
Shots
23

15 February 2025; 18:00	Switzerland	6–1 (1–0, 3–1, 2–0)	Ukraine	Tbilisi Ice Arena, Tbilisi

Yannis Zambelli
Goalies
Illia Bobrov
Referees:
(Finland) Maria Hauhia
(Sweden) Oscar Niklasson
Linesmen:
(Switzerland) Humair Baptiste
(Switzerland) Manuela Lenhart

Achermann (Dubé, Prosser) – 18:31	1–0
Achermann (Schwanemann, Rüegsegger) – PP2 – 21:05	2–0
Sauthier (Kriesi) – 22:19	3–0
	3–1	28:54 – PP1 – Luchkin (Spaskin, Skyba)
Fueter (Kriesi, Bizzozero) – 35:34	4–1
Kriesi (Sauthier, Daron) – PP1 – 43:46	5–1
Liniger (Bizzozero, Sauthier) – 56:14	6–1

12 min
Penalties
10 min
21
Shots
22

==== Bronze medal game ====
16 February 2025; 11:00	Czechia	4–2 (1–0, 2–1, 1–1)	Ukraine	Tbilisi Ice Arena, Tbilisi

Václav Osvald
Goalies
Illia Bobrov
Referees:
(Finland) Eetu Rasalahti
(Germany) Harriet Weegh
Linesmen:
(Sweden) William Henriksson
(Czech Republic) Jaroslav Peluha

Kučera (Šejc) – SH1 – 12:41	1–0
	1–1	20:38 – PP1 – Olifirchuk (Voroteliak, Vasiak)
Hartl (Riedl, Vrbata) – 38:04	2–1
Hartl (Šedivý, Šejc) – 39:37	3–1
	3–2	44:37 – Vasiak (Voroteliak, Spaskin)
Šejc – 59:55	4–2

16 min
Penalties
2 min
23
Shots
32

==== Gold medal game ====
16 February 2025; 14:30	Slovakia	2–5 (1–0, 0–2, 1–3)	Switzerland	Tbilisi Ice Arena, Tbilisi

Denis Čelko
Goalies
Yannis Zambelli
Referees:
(Finland) Maria Hauhia
(Sweden) Oscar Niklasson
Linesmen:
(Switzerland) Jennifer Salzmann
(Slovakia) Miroslav Tvrdoň

Obušek (Matta, Tóth) – 10:52	1–0
	1–1	33:18 – Achermann (Prosser, Mukuna)
	1–2	39:03 – Prosser (Dubé, Achermann)
Hybský (Šimko, Válek) – 43:40	2–2
	2–3	44:03 – Münger (Rüegsegger)
	2–4	59:08 – SH1 – Achermann
	2–5	59:49 – SH1 – Fueter (Pralong)

6 min
Penalties
8 min
23
Shots
30

=== Rosters ===
Team	Roster
Austria	Goaltenders: Martin Haim, Kilian Streußnig; Defensemen: Dominik Ferner, Benedikt Hengelmüller, Gabriel Holzer, Marc Hudritsch, Lennart Leitner, Robin Stöckl, Paul Vaschauner (A); Forwards: Simon Cseh (A), Luca Fischer, Lucas Hartl, Ferdinand Humer, Nico Koschek, Ben Öfner, Jonathan Oschgan (C), Paul Schuster, Paul Sintschnig, Rafael Wagnsonner, Quentin Wallner; Head coach: Peter Schweda; Assistant coach: Johnnes Leitner, Maximilian Wehrhan (goaltender)
Czechia	Goaltenders: Václav Osvald, Simon Pešout; Defensemen: Tadeáš Chalupa, Daniel Filip, Adam Hynek (A), Robin Kavan, Denis Korhoň, Dominik Novák, Tomáš Zikmund; Forwards: Dominik Drábek, Michal Hartl (C), Daniel Helis, Matěj Kučera, Adam Němec (A), Antonín Riedl, Štěpán Stejskal, Jaroslav Šedivý, Šimon Šejc, Denis Viedemann, Kryštof Vrbata; Head coach: Marek Melenovský; Assistant coaches: Tomáš Andrys, Marek Schwartz (goaltender)
Latvia	Goaltenders: Patriks Plūmiņš, Tomass Rutulis; Defensemen: Reinholds Circenis, Leonards Grundmanis, Kristaps Katkovskis, Herberts Laugalis (A), Oskars Lūks, Artūrs Masaļskis; Forwards: Rainers Belovs, Rūdolfs Bērzkalns (A), Jānis Jukāms, Martins Klaucāns (C), Timurs Mališevs, Makss Mihailovs, Kristers Obuks, Daniels Reidzāns, Stefans Rots, Ričards Rutkis, Dāvids Tarvids, Henrijs Upenieks; Head coach: Lauris Dārziņš; Assistant coach: Jānis Sprukts, Raimonds Vilkoits
Slovakia	Goaltenders: Denis Čelko, Jakub Husár; Defensemen: Matej Bereš, Oliver Botka, Roderik Černák, Filip Kovalčík (A), Marko Požgay, Jakub Syrný, Denis Tóth; Forwards: Ján Čurlej, Juraj Jonas Ďurčo, Samuel Hybský, Kristián Macák, Ivan Matta, Adam Obušek (A), Kristián Rezničák, Maxim Šimko, Tomáš Šromovský, Matej Stankoven (C), Matúš Válek; Head coach: Peter Kúdelka; Assistant coach: Peter Čížek, Rastislav Staňa (goaltender)
Switzerland	Goaltenders: Nico Keller, Yannis Zambelli; Defensemen: Niccolò Castiglioni, Loïc Mukuna, Roméo Pralong, Wsewolod Schwanemann, Vito Thoma (C), Dennis van Gessel; Forwards: Raphaël Achermann, Ryan Bizzozero, Jan Daron, Liam Dubé, Sol Fueter (A), Sven Kriesi, Elia Liniger, Tim Münger, Tadeo Prosser, Moritz Rüegsegger, Maxime Sauthier (A), Pascal Schürmann; Head coach: Patrick Schob; Assistant coach: Sven Dick, Daniel Manzato (goaltender)
Ukraine	Goaltenders: Illia Bobrov, Fedir Kolpovskyi; Defensemen: Arkhyp Holin, Mykhailo Korobkin (C), Yehor Ostapenko, Yaroslav Panasenko, Daniel Skyba, Mykhailo Stupnitskyi; Forwards: Arsenii Denysenko, Platon Isaiev, Mykola Kasatkin, Oleksii Kryvonos, Klym Luchkin (A), Danylo Olifirchuk, Yehor Polishchuk, Yefym Sokhanevych, Myroslav Spaskin, Sviatoslav Vasiak, Arsienii Voroteliak, Oleksandr Zhdanov (A); Head coach: Oleksandr Bobkin; Assistant coach: Ruslan Borysenko, Oleksandr Fedorov
