= Ice hockey at the 2017 European Youth Olympic Winter Festival =

2017 European Youth Olympic Winter Festival – Ice hockey

Tournament details
- Host country: Turkey
- Venue: 1 (in 1 host city)
- Dates: 13–17 February 2017
- Teams: 6

Final positions
- Champions: Russia
- Runners-up: Belarus
- Third place: Slovakia
- Fourth place: France

Ice hockey at the 2017 European Youth Olympic Winter Festival was a men's under-18 ice hockey tournament played during the Erzurum 2017 edition of the European Youth Olympic Festival (EYOF). It was held at the Erzurum GSIM Ice Arena in Erzurum, Turkey from 13 to 17 February 2017. Five countries participated in the tournament.

== Group stage ==
All times are local (UTC+3).

=== Group A ===
Team	GP	W	OTW	OTL	L	GF	GA	DIF	Pts
Russia	2	2	0	0	0	51	0	+51	6
France	2	1	0	0	1	10	9	+1	3
Turkey	2	0	0	0	2	0	52	−52	0

13 February 2017; 15:00	Turkey	0–42 (0–15, 0–12, 0–15)	Russia	Erzurum GSIM Ice Arena; Attendance: 600

Game reference
14 min	Penalties	4 min
9	Shots	113

14 February 2017; 15:00	Russia	9–0 (2–0, 5–0, 2–0)	France	Erzurum GSIM Ice Arena; Attendance: 280

Game reference
14 min	Penalties	16 min
56	Shots	18

15 February 2017; 15:00	France	10–0 (4–0, 3–0, 3–0)	Turkey	Erzurum GSIM Ice Arena; Attendance: 600

Game reference
12 min	Penalties	12 min
60	Shots	11

=== Group B ===
Team	GP	W	OTW	OTL	L	GF	GA	DIF	Pts
Belarus	1	1	0	0	0	3	1	+2	3
Slovakia	1	0	0	0	1	1	3	−2	0

14 February 2017; 18:30	Slovakia	1–3 (0–1, 1–0, 0–2)	Belarus	Erzurum GSIM Ice Arena; Attendance: 500

Game reference
16 min	Penalties	10 min
31	Shots	43

== Knockout stage ==
=== Semifinals ===
16 February 2017; 15:00	Belarus	2–1 (1–0, 1–1, 0–0)	France	Erzurum GSIM Ice Arena; Attendance: 300

Game reference
26 min	Penalties	12 min
38	Shots	28

16 February 2017; 18:30	Russia	4–2 (1–1, 2–0, 1–1)	Slovakia	Erzurum GSIM Ice Arena; Attendance: 600

Game reference
22 min	Penalties	24 min
35	Shots	27

=== Bronze medal game ===
17 February 2017; 13:00	France	2–3 (0–1, 0–1, 2–1)	Slovakia	Erzurum GSIM Ice Arena; Attendance: 100

Game reference
8 min	Penalties	10 min
36	Shots	43

=== Final ===
17 February 2017; 16:30	Russia	7–1 (2–1, 1–0, 4–0)	Belarus	Erzurum GSIM Ice Arena; Attendance: 1,400

Game reference
14 min	Penalties	16 min
48	Shots	23
