= Judo at the 2015 European Youth Summer Olympic Festival =

Judo competition

Judo Judo at the 2015 European Youth Summer Olympic Festival
- Venue: Judo Academy of Georgia
- Location: (Georgia (country)) Tbilisi, Georgia
- Dates: 28 July 2015
- Competitors: 305 from 45 nations

Competition at external databases
- Links: EJU • JudoInside

The Judo at the 2015 European Youth Summer Olympic Festival contest was held at the Judo Academy of Georgia in Tbilisi, Georgia on 28 July, 2015.

== Results ==
=== Boys ===
Event	Gold	Silver	Bronze
–50 kg	Biagio D'Angelo (ITA)	Paul Ronchi (SUI)	Ibrahim Bayramli (AZE) Zurab Kakhniashvili (GEO)
–55 kg	Ion Mihailov (MDA)	Karamat Huseynov (AZE)	Luca Carlino (ITA) Temur Nozadze (GEO)
–60 kg Extra-lightweight	Robinzon Beglarishvili (GEO)	Manuel Lombardo (ITA)	Lars Kamphuis (NED) Ismayil Ibrahimov (AZE)
–66 kg Half-lightweight	Giovanni Esposito (ITA)	Hievorh Manukian (UKR)	Bagrati Niniashvili (GEO) Joris Boes (NED)
–73 kg Lightweight	Hasil Jafarov (AZE)	Răzvan Ciolan (ROU)	Vasili Balampanasvili (GRE) Lukas Wittwer (SUI)
–81 kg Half-middleweight	Murad Kurbanismailov (RUS)	Miroslav Kopiš (SVK)	Apor Tóth (HUN) Jan Reijntjens (NED)
–90 kg Middleweight	Onise Saneblidze (GEO)	Aliumar Tumaev (RUS)	Oleksii Babenko (UKR) Simeon Catharina (NED)
+90 kg	Stephan Hegyi (AUT)	Vladyslav Berezka (UKR)	Yahor Kukharenka (BLR) Gela Zaalishvili (GEO)

=== Girls ===
Event	Gold	Silver	Bronze
–44 kg	Sofia Petitto (ITA)	Laura Martinez Abelenda (ESP)	Dominika Kincelová (SVK) Szandra Tamasi (HUN)
–48 kg Extra-lightweight	Coraline Marcus Tabellion (FRA)	Sarah Herrmann (GER)	Natalia Kipshidze (GEO) Nadežda Petrović (SRB)
–52 kg Half-lightweight	Mzia Beboshvili (GEO)	Ilse Buren (NED)	Nasiba Ibragimova (RUS) İrem Korkmaz (TUR)
–57 kg Lightweight	Eteri Liparteliani (GEO)	Anna Dabrowska (POL)	Danna Nagucheva (RUS) Emilia Kanerva (FIN)
–63 kg Half-middleweight	Jovana Obradović (SRB)	Iryna Khryashchevska (UKR)	Lara Kliba (CRO) Sanne Vermeer (NED)
–70 kg Middleweight	Alice Bellandi (ITA)	Jovana Peković (MNE)	Petra Opresnik (SLO) Karla Prodan (CRO)
+70 kg	Annalisa Calagreti (ITA)	Raz Hershko (ISR)	Mercedesz Szigetvári (HUN) Markéta Paulusová (CZE)
