= Tennis at the 2022 European Youth Summer Olympic Festival =

- Venue: Sports Park Tennis
- Date: 25–30 July 2022
- Competitors: 65 from 34 nations

Tennis at the 2022 European Youth Summer Olympic Festival was held at the Sports Park Tennis in Banská Bystrica, Slovakia from 25 to 30 July 2022.

== Medal table ==
* Host nation (Slovakia)

Rank	Nation	Gold	Silver	Bronze	Total
1	Slovakia (SVK)*	2	0	0	2
2	Czech Republic (CZE)	1	0	0	1
3	Germany (GER)	0	1	1	2
3	Romania (ROM)	0	1	1	2
5	Spain (ESP)	0	1	0	1
6	Poland (POL)	0	0	1	1
Totals (6 entries)		3	3	3	9

== Medalists ==
Event	Gold	Silver	Bronze
Boys' singles	Jan Kumštát; Czech Republic	Sergio Planella Hernández; Spain	Tom Sickenberger; Germany
Girls' singles	Renáta Jamrichová; Slovakia	Philippa Farber; Germany	Eva Ionescu; Romania
Mixed doubles	Renáta Jamrichová; Daniel Balaščák; Slovakia	Eva Ionescu; Gabriel Ghețu; Romania	Antonina Czajka; Alan Ważny; Poland

== Participating nations ==
A total of 65 athletes from 34 nations competed in tennis at the 2022 European Youth Summer Olympic Festival:

- Albania (2)
- Armenia (2)
- Austria (2)
- Azerbaijan (1)
- Belgium (2)
- Bulgaria (2)
- Cyprus (2)
- Czech Republic (2)
- Denmark (2)
- Estonia (2)
- Finland (2)
- Georgia (2)
- Germany (2)
- Greece (2)
- Hungary (2)
- Iceland (1)
- Ireland (2)
- Israel (2)
- Italy (2)
- Kosovo (2)
- Latvia (2)
- Lithuania (2)
- Luxembourg (2)
- Moldova (2)
- Poland (2)
- Portugal (2)
- Romania (2)
- San Marino (1)
- Slovakia (2)
- Slovenia (2)
- Spain (2)
- Sweden (2)
- Switzerland (2)
- Turkey (2)
