= 1995 European Youth Summer Olympic Days =

1995 European Youth Olympic Days
- Host city: Bath
- Country: United Kingdom
- Nations: 47
- Athletes: 1,709
- Sport: 10
- Events: 86
- Opening: 9 July 1995
- Closing: 14 July 1995
- Opened by: Anne, Princess Royal

Summer

Winter

The 1995 European Youth Summer Olympic Days was the third edition of multi-sport event for European youths between the ages of 12 and 18. It was held at the University of Bath, United Kingdom from 9 to 14 July 1995. A total of ten sports were contested.

== Sports ==
1995 European Youth Summer Olympic Days Sports Programme
- Athletics
- Basketball
- Cycling
- Field hockey
- Football
- Gymnastics
- Handball
- Judo
- Swimming
- Volleyball

== Medal table ==
* Host nation (Great Britain)

Rank	Nation	Gold	Silver	Bronze	Total
1	Great Britain (GBR)*	24	10	8	42
2	Russia (RUS)	12	8	7	27
3	Romania (ROU)	8	8	7	23
4	Spain (ESP)	5	5	8	18
5	France (FRA)	5	4	5	14
6	Israel (ISR)	4	1	1	6
7	Ukraine (UKR)	3	5	8	16
8	Italy (ITA)	2	4	3	9
8	Poland (POL)	2	4	3	9
10	Belgium (BEL)	2	4	1	7
11	Hungary (HUN)	2	3	5	10
12	Belarus (BLR)	2	1	5	8
13	Slovakia (SVK)	2	1	3	6
14	Lithuania (LTU)	2	0	0	2
15	Netherlands (NED)	1	4	5	10
16	Greece (GRE)	1	2	3	6
16	Sweden (SWE)	1	2	3	6
18	Germany (GER)	1	1	4	6
19	Georgia (GEO)	1	1	3	5
20	Estonia (EST)	1	1	2	4
20	Turkey (TUR)	1	1	2	4
22	Switzerland (SUI)	1	1	0	2
23	Croatia (CRO)	1	0	3	4
24	Bulgaria (BUL)	1	0	0	1
24	Finland (FIN)	1	0	0	1
24	Portugal (POR)	1	0	0	1
27	Slovenia (SLO)	0	4	3	7
28	Ireland (IRL)	0	4	1	5
29	Austria (AUT)	0	3	4	7
30	Norway (NOR)	0	1	1	2
31	Azerbaijan (AZE)	0	1	0	1
31	Cyprus (CYP)	0	1	0	1
33	Latvia (LAT)	0	0	2	2
33	Yugoslavia (FR Yugoslavia)	0	0	2	2
35	Denmark (DEN)	0	0	1	1
36	Albania (ALB)	0	0	0	0
36	Czech Republic (CZE)	0	0	0	0
36	Iceland (ISL)	0	0	0	0
36	Luxembourg (LUX)	0	0	0	0
36	Moldova (MDA)	0	0	0	0
Totals (40 entries)		87	85	103	275
