= Turkey at the European Youth Olympic Festival =

- IOC code: TUR
- NOC: Turkish Olympic Committee
- Website: www.olimpiyatkomitesi.org.tr (in Turkish)
- Medals: Gold 33 Silver 28 Bronze 51 Total 112

Turkey participated in nine editions of eleven European Youth Summer Olympic Festivals since its establishment in 1991.

As of 2011, Turkish youth athletes have won a total of 39 medals, divided into 11 golds, 9 silvers and 19 bronzes. Turkey hosted 2011 Summer Festival and 2017 Winter Festival.

== Medal tables ==
=== Medals by Summer Youth Olympic Festival ===
Games	Athletes	Gold	Silver	Bronze	Total	Rank
(Belgium) 1991 Brussels		2	0	0	2	11
(Netherlands) 1993 Valkenswaard	Did not participate					
(United Kingdom) 1995 Bath		1	1	2	4	20
(Portugal) 1997 Lisbon		0	3	1	4	25
(Denmark) 1999 Esbjerg		1	1	1	3	21
(Spain) 2001 Murcia	Did not participate					
(France) 2003 Paris		0	0	2	2	36
(Italy) 2005 Lignano Sabbiadoro	49	1	1	0	2	27
(Serbia) 2007 Belgrade	55	1	2	2	5	21
(Finland) 2009 Tampere	49	4	1	6	11	8
(Turkey) 2011 Trabzon	52	2	0	7	9	20
(Netherlands) 2013 Utrecht	53	4	2	7	13	8
(Georgia (country)) 2015 Tbilisi	84	1	2	3	6	26
(Hungary) 2017 Győr	54	5	6	8	19	7
(Azerbaijan) 2019 Baku	126	11	6	10	27	3
(Slovakia) 2021 Košice
2023
2025	-	10	7	9	26	4
Total		33	25	49	107	

=== Medals by Winter Youth Olympic Festival ===
Games	Athletes	Gold	Silver	Bronze	Total	Rank
(Italy) 1993 Aosta	Did not participate					
1995 Andorra la Vella	Did not participate					
(Sweden) 1997 Sundsvall	Did not participate					
(Slovakia) 1999 Poprad-Tatry	Did not participate					
(Finland) 2001 Vuokatti	Did not participate					
(Slovenia) 2003 Bled	10	0	0	0	0	–
(Switzerland) 2005 Monthey		0	0	0	0	–
(Spain) 2007 Jaca	18	0	0	0	0	–
(Poland) 2009 Silesian Voivodeship	25	0	0	0	0	–
(Czech Republic) 2011 Liberec	30	0	0	0	0	–
(Romania) 2013 Braşov	28	0	0	0	0	–
(Austria) / 2015 Vorarlberg and Liechtenstein	29	0	0	0	0	–
(Turkey) 2017 Erzurum	69	0	2	1	3	11
(Bosnia and Herzegovina) 2019 Sarajevo and Istočno Sarajevo	35	0	1	1	2	16
(Finland) 2022 Vuokatti		0	0	0	0	-
(Italy) 2023 Friuli-Venezia Giulia
Total		0	3	2	5	

=== Medals by summer sport ===
Sport	Gold	Silver	Bronze	Total
Athletics	8	10	9	27
Judo	6	6	14	26
Swimming	5	2	6	13
Volleyball	3	0	3	6
Basketball	0	1	5	6
Gymnastics	0	0	2	2
Totals (6 entries)	22	19	39	80

=== Medals by winter sport ===
Sport	Gold	Silver	Bronze	Total
Short track speed skating	0	2	1	3
Curling	0	1	0	1
Snowboarding	0	0	1	1
Totals (3 entries)	0	3	2	5

== List of medalists ==
=== Summer Festivals ===
Medal	Name	Games	Sport	Event
Gold	Derya Büyükuncu	(Belgium) 1991 Brussels	Swimming	Boys' 100 m backstroke
Gold	Derya Büyükuncu	(Belgium) 1991 Brussels	Swimming	Boys' 200 m backstroke
Gold	Süha Akman	(United Kingdom) 1995 Bath	Swimming	Boys' 200 m breaststroke
Silver	G. Yarin	(United Kingdom) 1995 Bath	Judo	Girls' 44 kg
Bronze	D. Aktaş	(United Kingdom) 1995 Bath	Judo	Girls' 40 kg
Bronze	F. Kiroğlu	(United Kingdom) 1995 Bath	Judo	Girls' 61 kg
Silver	İshak Kaya	(Portugal) 1997 Lisbon	Athletics	Boys' 1500 m
Silver	Erbay Fındık	(Portugal) 1997 Lisbon	Judo	Boys' 50 kg
Silver	Ebru Aktan	(Portugal) 1997 Lisbon	Judo	Girls' 61 kg
Bronze	Zehra Doğan	(Portugal) 1997 Lisbon	Judo	Girls' 52 kg
Gold	Ümit Koçlardan	(Denmark) 1999 Esbjerg	Athletics	Boys' 3000 m
Silver	Rüştü Yıldırım	(Denmark) 1999 Esbjerg	Judo	Boys' 90 kg
Bronze	Gülşah Gönenç	(Denmark) 1999 Esbjerg	Swimming	Girls' 200 m butterfly

=== Winter Festivals ===
Medal	Name	Games	Sport	Event
Silver	Girls' curling team: Mihriban Polat Berivan Polat Kader Macit Zeynep Oztemir Hilal Nevruz	(Turkey) 2017 Erzurum	Curling	Girls' tournament
Silver	Hazar Karagöl	(Turkey) 2017 Erzurum	Short track speed skating	Boys' 1000 m
Bronze	Aydan Karakulak	(Turkey) 2017 Erzurum	Snowboarding	Girls' parallel giant slalom
Silver	Furkan Akar	(Bosnia and Herzegovina) 2019 Sarajevo and Istočno Sarajevo	Short track speed skating	Boys' 1500 m
Bronze	Furkan Akar	(Bosnia and Herzegovina) 2019 Sarajevo and Istočno Sarajevo	Short track speed skating	Boys' 500 m

== See also ==
- Turkey at the Youth Olympics
- Turkey at the Olympics
- Turkey at the Paralympics
- Turkey at the European Games
- Turkey at the Universiade
