= Bozburun (disambiguation) =

Bozburun is a seaside town of Turkey.

Bozburun may also refer to:

- Bozburun Bay, a bay of Turkey
- Bozburun Peninsula, a peninsula of Turkey
- Bozburun, Aşkale
