= Palandöken (disambiguation) =

Palandöken Mountain is a mountain in Erzurum Province, Turkey.

Palandöken may also refer to:

- Palandöken Dam, a dam in Erzurum Province, Turkey
- Palandöken, Erzurum, a district of Erzurum province, Turkey
- Palandöken Ice Skating Hall, an ice hockey venue in Erzurum, Turkey
- Palandöken Ski Center, a ski center in Palandöken Mountain, Turkey
