= Ocaklı =

Ocaklı can refer to:

- Ocaklı, Aşkale
- Ocaklı, Dinar
- Ocaklı, Gelibolu
- Ocaklı, Nazilli
