= Sazlı =

Sazlı can refer to:

- Sazlı, Aşkale
- Sazlı, Ayvacık
- Sazlı, Bismil
- Sazlı, Söke

== See also ==
- Sazlıçökek, Sur
