= Mount Phoenix =

Mount Phoenix (Ancient Greek: Φοῖνιξ, romanized: Phoniix), also Mount Phoenicius (Ancient Greek: Φοινίκιους, romanized: Phoinikious; Latin: Phoenicius mons, Mons Phoenicium), may refer to:

- Mount Phoenix (Boeotia), adjacent to Lake Copais, modern Greece
- Mount Phoenix (Caria), Karayüksek Dağ, in the Bozburun Peninsula, modern Turkey
- Mount Phoenix (Lycia), modern Turkey
