= Koçbaba =

Koçbaba can refer to:

- Koçbaba, Aşkale
- Koçbaba, Hazro
