= Demirtepe =

Demirtepe can refer to:

- Demirtepe, Gelibolu
- Demirtepe, Karakoçan
