= Volleyball at the 1991 European Youth Olympic Days =

The volleyball competition at the 1991 European Youth Olympic Days was held from 18 to 20 July. The events took place in Brussels, Belgium. Girls born 1976 or 1977 or later participated in the event. No boys event was held. The event was held in the traditional indoor team format.

== Medal summary ==
=== Men ===
Event	Gold	Silver	Bronze
Basketball	Italy	Germany	Belgium
