= Özler =

Özler can refer to the following places in Turkey:

- Özler, Aşkale
- Özler, Gercüş

== See also ==
- Abraham Ozler, a 2024 Indian crime thriller film
