= Basketball at the 1991 European Youth Olympic Days =

- Host city: Brussels, Belgium
- Date(s): 1991
- Nations participating: 50
- Events: 26

The basketball competition at the 1991 European Youth Olympic Days was held from 18 to 20 July. The events took place in Brussels, Belgium. Boys born 1976 or 1977 or later participated in the event. No girls event was held.

== Medal summary ==
=== Men ===
Event	Gold	Silver	Bronze
Basketball	Spain	Italy	Greece
