= Küçükova =

Küçükova can refer to:

- Küçükova, Aşkale
- Küçükova, Maden
