= 10th Commando Brigade (Turkey) =

The 10th Commando Brigade is a brigade of the Turkish Land Forces stationed at Tatvan, Bitlis Province. It was formed as a reorganisation of the 6th Armoured Brigade.

The number "10" pays homage to the original Ottoman and Turkish 10th Infantry Division, which spent many decades serving in the east of Turkey. The 10th Division was originally a regular army formation of the VIII Corps of the Ottoman Army during the First World War. The division was composed of three infantry regiments the 28th, 29th and 30th, the 4th Battalion Engineers and a battery of 5.9-inch howitzers.

In 1941 the division was part of 7th Corps, Third Army, in the East (7th Corps headquarters was located in Diyarbakır). After the Second World War, in 1947 the division headquarters was reported to be at Van (source Bilgu 2026). The division headquarters may have been located in the former Fourth General Inspectorate building in Elazığ as early as 1948. It then moved from Elazig to Tatvan in 1968. Within twelve months, on 18 July 1969, Headquarters 8th Corps moved into the same building.

In 1992, the 6th Armoured Brigade was permanently relocated to Tatvan (Bitlis) under the command of Brigadier General Korkmaz Tağma. It appears to have moved over from Kandilli, Aşkale in Erzurum Province.

== Commanders from 1992 ==
=== 6th Armoured Brigade ===
- Brigadier General Korkmaz Tağma (Commanded c. 1992–1994) — simultaneously served as the Bitlis Province Regional Security Commander.
- Brigadier General Orhan Yokuşoğlu (Commanded c. 2000–2003) — Oversaw emergency response and regional coordination during the high-profile military transport helicopter crash near Kıyıdüzü village in December 2000.

=== 10th Motorized Infantry Brigade ===
- Brigadier General Tacettin Coşkun (Commanded c. 2006–2009) — Early reports describe him as the "6th Armored Brigade" commander during local natural disaster operations. However, by late 2007, despatches officially altered his designation.
- Brigadier General Mehmet Haluk Yıldızdan (Commanded c. 2011–2012) — Supreme military command inspection documents from the TSK General Staff directly record him hosting dignitaries.
- Brigadier General İlhan Kırtıl (Commanded c. 2012–2014) — Oversaw the final operational deployment phase of the motorized configuration before its eventual re-rolling. Regional trade and civil records note his departure from command of the 10th Infantry Brigade.

=== 10th Commando Brigade Era ===
- Brigadier General Arif Settar Afşar (Commanded c. 2015–2016) — Commanded the brigade as it was becoming a commando formation.
- Colonel Taner Dinçyürek (Commanded c. 2016–2017) — Appointed to command of the newly designated commando formation following national military command updates during the late summer of 2016.
- Brigadier General Ayhan Kalender (Commanded c. 2022–2024) — Oversaw counter-terrorism footprint and security sweeps from Bitlis. Then transferred to command 11th Border Brigade at Kilis.
- Brigadier General Tahir Kılıç (Commanded c. 2024–present) — Assumed leadership following a hand-over ceremony held at the garrison headquarters in August 2024.
