= Karahasan =

Karahasan can refer to:

- Karahasan, Aşkale
- Karahasan, Ulus
- Dževad Karahasan (1953–2023), Bosnian writer and philosopher

== See also ==
- Carahasani, a village in Ștefan Vodă District, Moldova
