= Football at the 1991 European Youth Olympic Days =

- Host city: Brussels, Belgium
- Date(s): 1991
- Nations participating: 7
- Athletes participating: 126
- Events: 1

The football competition at the 1991 European Youth Olympic Days was held from 18 to 20 July. The events took place in Brussels, Belgium. Boys born 1976 or 1977 or later participated in the event. No girls event was held.

== Format ==
Seven teams entered the event, which was played in an uneven format. In the first preliminary round three teams played a round robin format, with two teams proceeding to the semifinals. The other four teams played a pair of straight quarterfinals, with the winners joining the other two teams in the semifinals. The three teams that failed to reach the semifinals played a further round robin series to establish 5th, 6th and 7th places.

=== Participating nations ===
GROUP A

- Republic of Ireland
- Netherlands
- Luxembourg

GROUP B

- Spain
- Portugal
- Denmark
- Belgium

== Preliminary round ==
=== Group A ===
Ireland, Luxembourg and the Netherlands played a round robin series in this half of the draw.

July 18, 1991

Republic of Ireland	1–0	Luxembourg

Heysel Stadium, Brussels
July 18, 1991

Republic of Ireland	1–0	Netherlands

Heysel Stadium, Brussels
July 18, 1991

Netherlands	0–1	Luxembourg

Heysel Stadium, Brussels

Team	Pld	W	D	L	GF	GA	GD	Pts
Republic of Ireland	2	2	0	0	2	0	+2	4
Luxembourg	2	1	0	1	1	1	0	2
Netherlands	2	0	0	2	0	2	−2	0

=== Group B ===
Four teams in this pool played a single pair of knockout matches, with the winners qualifying for the semifinals.

July 18, 1991

Spain	6–1	Denmark

Heysel Stadium, Brussels
July 18, 1991

Portugal	3–0	Belgium

Heysel Stadium, Brussels

== Semifinals ==
July 19, 1991

Portugal	3–0	Republic of Ireland

Heysel Stadium, Brussels
July 19, 1991

Spain	6–0	Luxembourg

Heysel Stadium, Brussels

== 5th–7th Playoff ==
July 20, 1991

Belgium	2–0	Netherlands

Heysel Stadium, Brussels
July 20, 1991

Belgium	0–0	Denmark

Heysel Stadium, Brussels
July 20, 1991

Netherlands	1–2	Denmark

Heysel Stadium, Brussels
July 20, 1991

Belgium	1–0	Netherlands

Heysel Stadium, Brussels
July 20, 1991

Belgium	1–1	Denmark

Heysel Stadium, Brussels
July 20, 1991

Netherlands	1–0	Denmark

Heysel Stadium, Brussels

Team	Pld	W	D	L	GF	GA	GD	Pts
Belgium	4	2	2	0	4	1	+3	6
Denmark	4	1	2	1	3	3	0	4
Netherlands	4	1	0	3	2	5	−3	2

== Bronze medal match ==
July 20, 1991

Republic of Ireland	5–0	Luxembourg

Heysel Stadium, Brussels

== Gold medal match ==
July 20, 1991

Portugal	2–1	Spain

Heysel Stadium, Brussels

== Medal summary ==
=== Men ===
Event	Gold	Silver	Bronze
Football	Portugal	Spain	Ireland
