= Yaylımlı =

Yaylımlı can refer to:

- Yaylımlı, Aşkale
- Yaylımlı, Tut
