= Tennis at the 1991 European Youth Olympic Days =

The tennis competition at the 1991 European Youth Olympic Days was held from 18 to 20 July. The events took place in Brussels, Belgium. Girls and boys born 1976 or 1977 or later participated in the event. Singles competition only was presented.

== Medal summary ==
Event	Gold	Silver	Bronze
Men's singles	Martin Hromec; Czechoslovakia	Giannandrea Gallo; Italy	Ivo Heuberger; Switzerland
Women's singles	Sara Ventura; Italy	Alicia Ortuño; Spain	Laurence Courtois; Belgium
