= Hacıhamza =

Hacıhamza can refer to:

- Hacıhamza, Aşkale
- Hacıhamza, Kargı
