= Eyüpoğlu =

Eyüpoğlu can refer to:

- Eyüpoğlu, Aşkale
- Eyüpoğlu, Bartın
