= Kükürtlü =

Kükürtlü can refer to:

- Kükürtlü, Aşkale
- Kükürtlü, Horasan
