= Field hockey at the 1991 European Youth Olympic Days =

- Host city: Brussels, Belgium
- Date: 1991
- Nations: 50
- Events: 26

The field hockey competition at the 1991 European Youth Olympic Days was held from 18 to 20 July. The events took place in Brussels, Belgium. Girls born 1976 or 1977 or later participated in the event. No boys event was held.
