= Hacımahmut =

Hacımahmut can refer to:

- Hacımahmut, Aşkale
- Hacımahmut, Göynük
