= Tosunlu =

Tosunlu is a common village name used in Turkey. It can refer to:

- Tosunlu, Ardanuç
- Tosunlu, Aşkale
- Tosunlar, Çayırlı
- Tosunlar, Devrek
- Tosunlu, Karayazı
- Tosunlu, Kayapınar
- Tosunlu, Karkamış
- Tosunlu, Kızıltepe
- Tosunlu, Nizip
