= Ellie Soutter =

British snowboarder

Personal information
- Nationality: British
- Born: 25 July 2000 Bromley, London, England
- Died: 25 July 2018 (aged 18) Les Gets, Haute-Savoie, France

Sport
- Country: Great Britain
- Sport: Snowboarding
- Events: Snowboard cross, freeriding, freestyle
Medal record
Women's snowboarding
Representing Great Britain
European Youth Olympic Winter Festival
Bronze medal – third place	2017 Erzurum	Snowboard cross

Ellie Soutter (25 July 2000 – 25 July 2018) was a British snowboarder. She won a bronze medal representing Great Britain at the 2017 European Youth Olympic Winter Festival in the snowboard cross.

== Early life and education ==
Ellie Soutter was born on 25 July 2000 in Bromley, London and grew up in Oxted, Surrey. Her parents, Tony Soutter and Lorraine Denman, divorced when she was young and Soutter and her father moved to Les Gets in the French Alps when she was nine years old. She attended local schools until 2015, at which point she was home-schooled for two years.

== Career ==
Soutter first learned to snowboard at the age of ten. She was a member of the inaugural British Europa Cup snowboard cross programme, and specialised in the freestyle, freeride and snowboard cross events. She began competing in international events in the 2016 snowboarding season, coached by French Olympic snowboarder Déborah Anthonioz.

Soutter won Great Britain's only medal at the 2017 European Youth Olympic Winter Festival, a bronze in the snowboard cross, and was also the team's flagbearer at the closing ceremony. In 2017 she was nominated and shortlisted for the Ski Club of Great Britain's Evie Pinching Award, an annual award for young snowsports athletes. Soutter had been selected to represent Great Britain at the Junior Snowboard World Championships in New Zealand in August 2018. Prior to her death, Soutter had been training in New Zealand.

== Personal life ==
Soutter was in a relationship with French snowboarder Oscar Mandin.

== Death ==
Soutter died by suicide, near her French home on her 18th birthday, on 25 July 2018.

A few days later, her father Tony said he thought her "history of mental health issues", combined with the pressure of high-level performance expectations, contributed to her death, and called on sports authorities to provide better support for young athletes. He said "mental health awareness needs to be really looked at and made more public". Several years later, her father would be more explicit, telling that Soutter suffered 7 major concussions between 2013 and 2018 and that every time she had another one, they got worse, and they took longer to recover from. Despite being told by doctors after each case that she was young enough to bounce back to full health, she was hospitalised after a final "huge" concussion. It was so bad that she didn't recognise her father or where she was. But even then, a neurologist concluded after a CT brain scan that she could continue competing and "was absolutely fine".

The Soutter family set up a fundraiser in her name to help poor young winter sports athletes. A family statement read, "as a junior athlete coming from a family without substantial wealth, Ellie often had to miss out on competing and training through lack of funds".
