= Yaylayolu =

Yaylayolu can refer to:

- Yaylayolu, Aşkale
- Yaylayolu, Tercan
