= Akören, Aşkale =

Village in Turkey

Akören
- Neighbourhood
- Location in Turkey
- Coordinates: 39°45′53″N 40°35′46″E
- Country: Turkey
- Province: Erzurum
- District: Aşkale
- Population (2022): 82
- Time zone: UTC+3 (TRT)

Akören is a neighbourhood in the municipality and district of Aşkale, Erzurum Province in Turkey. Its population is 82 (2022).
