= Alpine skiing at the 2017 European Youth Olympic Winter Festival =

Alpine skiing at the 2017 European Youth Olympic Winter Festival was held at the Palandoken Ski Centre in Erzurum, Turkey from 13 to 17 February 2017.

== Medal table ==
| Rank | Nation | Gold | Silver | Bronze | Total |
|---|---|---|---|---|---|
| 1 | Italy (ITA) | 2 | 0 | 2 | 4 |
| 2 | Russia (RUS) | 2 | 0 | 0 | 2 |
| 3 | Slovenia (SLO) | 1 | 1 | 0 | 2 |
| 4 | Finland (FIN) | 0 | 2 | 0 | 2 |
| 5 | France (FRA) | 0 | 1 | 2 | 3 |
| 6 | Croatia (CRO) | 0 | 1 | 0 | 1 |
| 7 | Czech Republic (CZE) | 0 | 0 | 1 | 1 |
| Totals (7 entries) | | 5 | 5 | 5 | 15 |

== Medal summary ==
=== Boys events ===
| Event | Gold | | Silver | | Bronze | |
|---|---|---|---|---|---|---|
| Giant slalom | Alex Vinatzer (ITA) | 2:10.06 | Turo Torvinen (FIN) | 2:10.49 +0.43 | Giovanni Zazzaro (ITA) | 2:11.25 +1.19 |
| Slalom | Alex Vinatzer (ITA) | 1:40.77 | Leon Nikić (CRO) | 1:44.19 +3.42 | Augustin Bianchini (FRA) | 1:44.81 +4.04 |

=== Ladies events ===
| Event | Gold | | Silver | | Bronze | |
|---|---|---|---|---|---|---|
| Giant slalom | Rinata Abdulkaiumova (RUS) | 2:12.62 | Doriane Escane (FRA) | 2:13.83 +1.21 | Nikola Bubáková (CZE) | 2:13.95 +1.33 |
| Slalom | Nika Tomšič (SLO) | 1:48.64 | Nella Korpio (FIN) | 1:48.85 +0.21 | Lara Della Mea (ITA) | 1:49.04 +0.40 |

=== Mixed events ===
| Event | Gold | Silver | Bronze |
|---|---|---|---|
| Parallel giant slalom | Russia (RUS); Rinata Abdulkaiumova; Sofia Krokhina; Natalia Sherina; Nikita Guryanov; Vladislav Osipov; Leonid Tryasov | Slovenia (SLO); Mišel Marovt; Živa Otoničar; Nika Tomšič; Nejc Naraločnik; Tadej Paščinski; Žak Žirovnik | France (FRA); Anouck Errard; Doriane Escane; Axelle Michelland; Augustin Bianchini; Jérémy Chauvet; Clement Guillot |
