= Dağyurdu, Aşkale =

Village in Turkey

Dağyurdu
- Neighbourhood
- Location in Turkey
- Coordinates: 39.728333°N 40.846667°E
- Country: Turkey
- Province: Erzurum
- District: Aşkale
- Population (2022): 98
- Time zone: UTC+3 (TRT)

Dağyurdu is a neighbourhood in the municipality and district of Aşkale, Erzurum Province in Turkey. Its population is 98 (2022).
