= Kandilli Ski Resort =

Ski resort in Erzurum Province, Turkey

- Location within Turkey
- Location: Aşkale, Erzurum Province, Turkey
- Nearest city: Erzurum
- Coordinates: 39°54′19″N 40°50′40″E
- Top elevation: 1,767 m (5,797 ft)
- Base elevation: 1,713 m (5,620 ft)
- Skiable area: 160 ha (400 acres)

Kandilli Ski Resort (Turkish: Kandilli Kayak Merkezi) is a ski resort for cross-country skiing and biathlon in Erzurum Province, eastern Turkey.

The ski resort is located in Aşkale district, 36 km (22 mi) west of Erzurum. It was established in 2010 for the 2011 Winter Universiade. It covers an area of 160 ha (400 acres) at elevations between 1,713 and 1,767 m (5,620 and 5,797 ft) above mean sea level. The resort is open to the public the year around.

Kandilli Ski Resort features 2.5, 3.75 and 5 km (1.55, 2.33 and 3.11 mi) long cross-country skiing trails, 1.3 and 1.6 km (0.81 and 0.99 mi) long sprint tracks as well as a ski stadium. The 1,297 m (4,255 ft)-long sprint track is 9–12 m (30–39 ft) wide with a 30 m (98 ft) maximum climbing difference.

== International events hosted ==
- 2011 Winter Universiade, 27 January – 6 February – snowboarding and freestyle skiing competitions.
- 2017 European Youth Olympic Winter Festival, 12 – 17 February – Biathlon and cross-country skiing.
