= Kavurmaçukuru, Aşkale =

Village in Turkey

Kavurmaçukuru
- Neighbourhood
- Location in Turkey
- Coordinates: 39°46′06″N 40°51′54″E
- Country: Turkey
- Province: Erzurum
- District: Aşkale
- Population (2022): 266
- Time zone: UTC+3 (TRT)

Kavurmaçukuru is a neighbourhood in the municipality and district of Aşkale, Erzurum Province in Turkey. Its population is 266 (2022).
