= Kelly Thomas =

British bobsledder

Kelly Thomas (born 9 January 1981) is a British bobsledder who has competed since 2007. She finished eleventh in the two-woman event at the 2010 Winter Olympics in Vancouver, British Columbia, Canada.

Thomas also competed in the two-woman event at the FIBT World Championships, but did not place either in 2008 or 2009. Her best World Cup finish was 11th in the two-woman event at Altenberg, Germany in December 2009.

In her youth she also competed as a track and field sprinter and was a 100 metres bronze medallist at the 1997 European Youth Olympic Days event.
