= Şadıllı, Gelibolu =

Village in Turkey

Şadıllı
- Village
- Location in Turkey Şadıllı (Marmara)
- Coordinates: 40°42′N 26°50′E
- Country: Turkey
- Province: Çanakkale
- District: Gelibolu
- Population (2021): 198
- Time zone: UTC+3 (TRT)

Şadıllı is a village in the Gelibolu District of Çanakkale Province in Turkey. Its population is 198 (2021).
