= Haydarhacı, Aşkale =

Village in Turkey

Haydarhacı
- Neighbourhood
- Location in Turkey
- Coordinates: 39°45′N 40°41′E
- Country: Turkey
- Province: Erzurum
- District: Aşkale
- Population (2022): 128
- Time zone: UTC+3 (TRT)

Haydarhacı is a neighbourhood in the municipality and district of Aşkale, Erzurum Province in Turkey. Its population is 128 (2022).
