= Musadanışman, Aşkale =

Village in Turkey

Musadanışman
- Neighbourhood
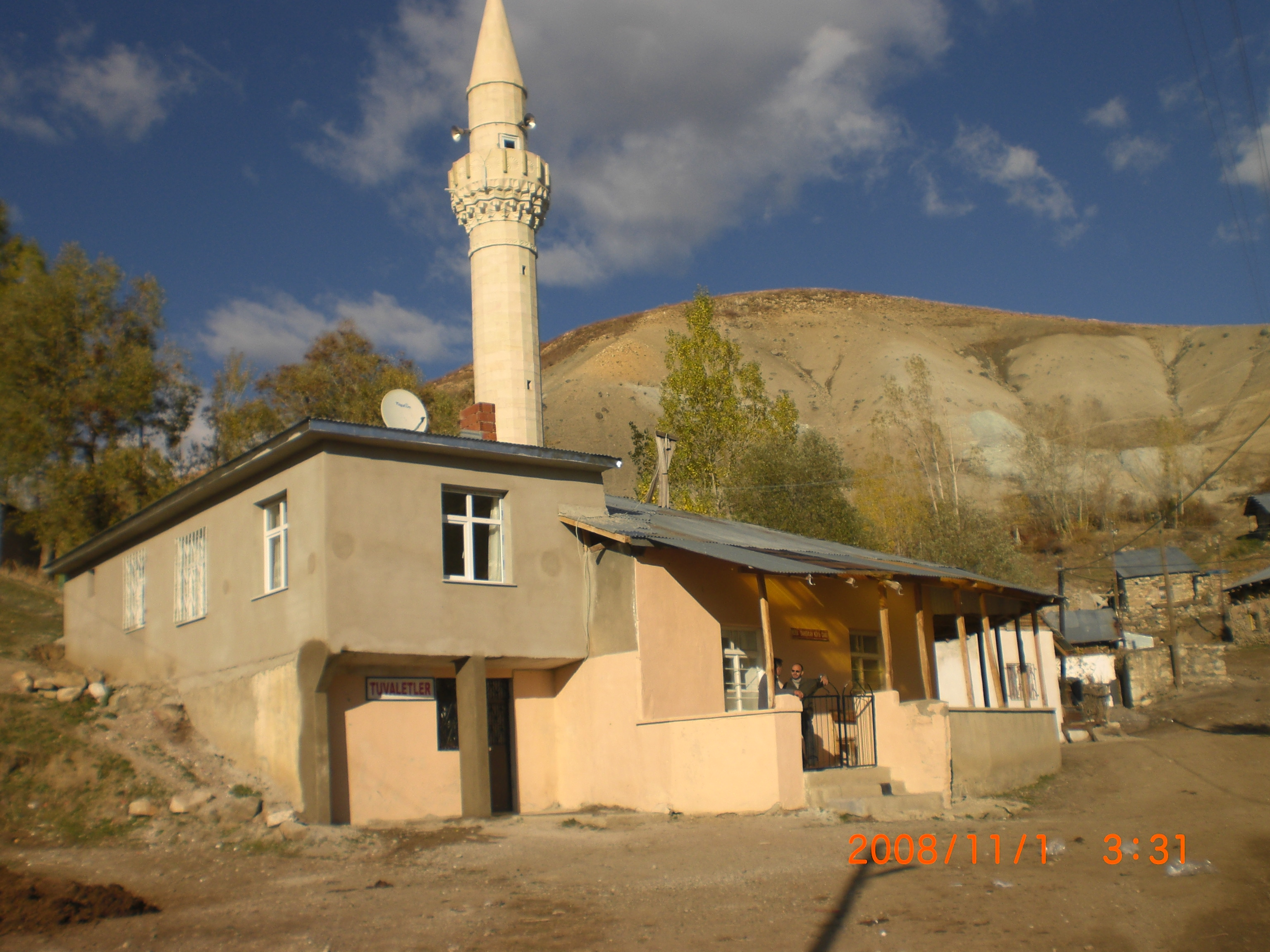

- Location within Turkey
- Coordinates: 40°02′N 40°38′E
- Country: Turkey
- Province: Erzurum
- District: Aşkale
- Population (2022): 94
- Time zone: UTC+3 (TRT)

Musadanışman is a neighbourhood in the municipality and district of Aşkale, Erzurum Province in Turkey. Its population is 94 (2022).
