= Tayfurköy, Gelibolu =

Village in Turkey

Tayfurköy
- Village
- Location in Turkey Tayfurköy (Marmara)
- Coordinates: 40°24′N 26°29′E
- Country: Turkey
- Province: Çanakkale
- District: Gelibolu
- Population (2021): 462
- Time zone: UTC+3 (TRT)

Tayfurköy is a village in the Gelibolu District of Çanakkale Province in Turkey. Its population is 462 (2021).
