= Hatuncuk, Aşkale =

Village in Turkey

Hatuncuk
- Neighbourhood
- Location in Turkey
- Coordinates: 39°49′N 40°42′E
- Country: Turkey
- Province: Erzurum
- District: Aşkale
- Population (2022): 65
- Time zone: UTC+3 (TRT)

Hatuncuk is a neighbourhood in the municipality and district of Aşkale, Erzurum Province in Turkey. Its population is 65 (2022).
