= Topalçavuş, Aşkale =

Village in Turkey

Topalçavuş
- Neighbourhood
- Location in Turkey
- Coordinates: 39°55′07″N 40°34′46″E
- Country: Turkey
- Province: Erzurum
- District: Aşkale
- Population (2022): 292
- Time zone: UTC+3 (TRT)

Topalçavuş is a neighbourhood in the municipality and district of Aşkale, Erzurum Province in Turkey. Its population is 292 (2022).
