= Cumalı, Gelibolu =

Village in Turkey

Cumalı
- Village
- Location in Turkey Cumalı (Marmara)
- Coordinates: 40.337°N 26.565°E
- Country: Turkey
- Province: Çanakkale
- District: Gelibolu
- Population (2021): 71
- Time zone: UTC+3 (TRT)

Cumalı is a village in the Gelibolu District of Çanakkale Province in Turkey. Its population is 71 (2021).
