= Tokça, Aşkale =

Village in Erzurum Province, Turkey

Tokça
- Neighbourhood
- Country: Turkey
- Province: Erzurum
- District: Aşkale
- Population (2022): 51
- Time zone: UTC+3 (TRT)

Tokça is a neighbourhood in the municipality and district of Aşkale, Erzurum Province in Turkey. Its population is 51 (2022). It is 93 km from Erzurum city centre and 40 km from Aşkale town centre.

== Population ==
Historical population
Year	Pop.	±% p.a.
1997	72	—
2007	66	−0.87%
2012	66	+0.00%
2017	37	−10.93%
2022	51	+6.63%
Source: 1997 census and TÜIK (2007-2022)
