= Büyükgeçit, Aşkale =

Village in Turkey

Büyükgeçit
- Neighbourhood
- Location in Turkey
- Coordinates: 39.970833°N 40.785°E
- Country: Turkey
- Province: Erzurum
- District: Aşkale
- Population (2022): 220
- Time zone: UTC+3 (TRT)

Büyükgeçit is a neighbourhood in the municipality and district of Aşkale, Erzurum Province in Turkey. Its population is 220 (2022).
