= Çokal, Gelibolu =

Village in Turkey

Çokal
- Village
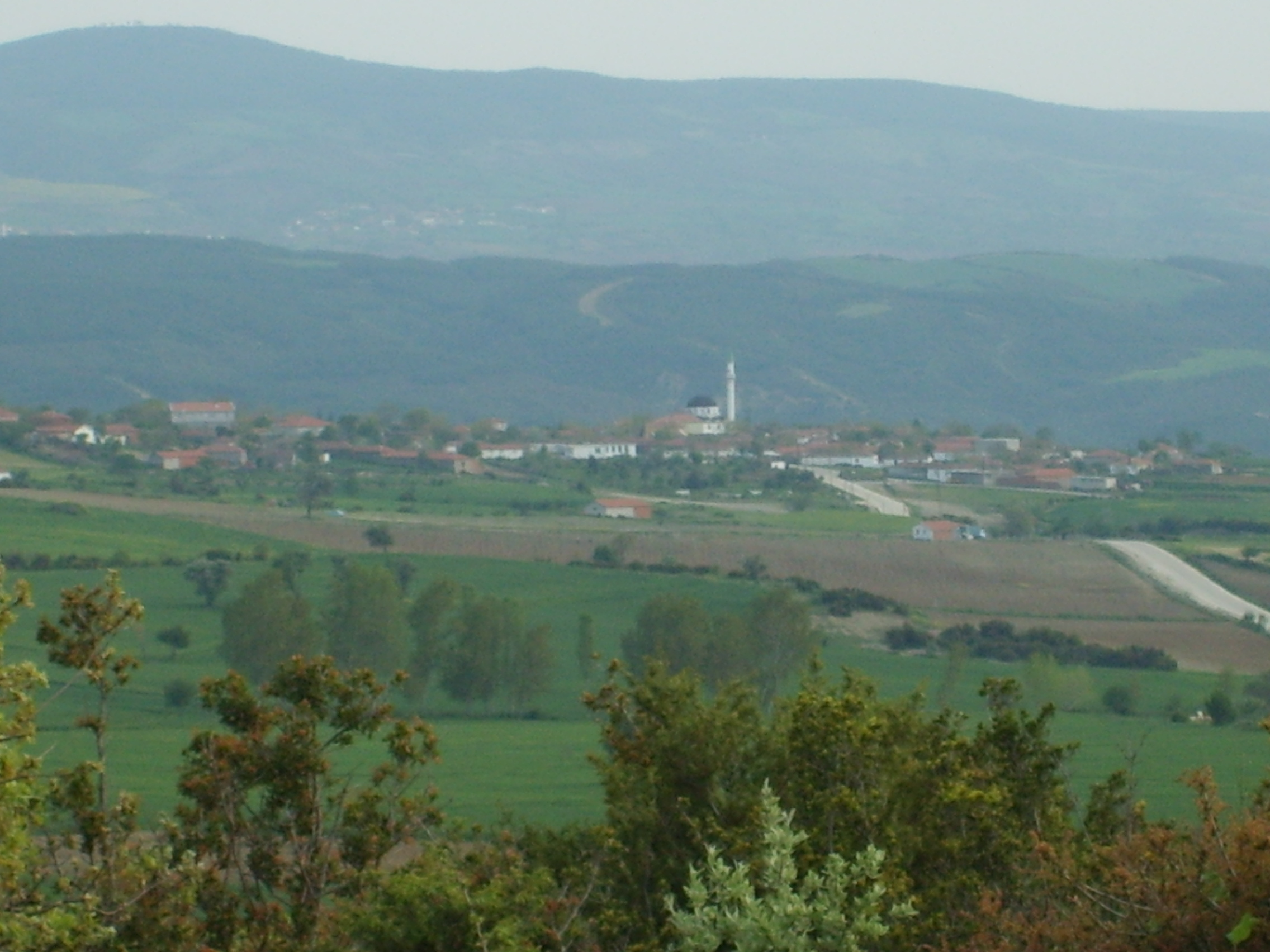

- Location within Turkey Location within Marmara
- Coordinates: 40°41′N 27°00′E
- Country: Turkey
- Province: Çanakkale
- District: Gelibolu
- Population (2021): 159
- Time zone: UTC+3 (TRT)

Çokal is a village in the Gelibolu District of Çanakkale Province in Turkey. Its population is 159 (2021).
