= Kocaçeşme, Gelibolu =

Village in Turkey

Kocaçeşme
- Village
- Location in Turkey Kocaçeşme (Marmara)
- Coordinates: 40°40′N 26°48′E
- Country: Turkey
- Province: Çanakkale
- District: Gelibolu
- Population (2021): 164
- Time zone: UTC+3 (TRT)

Kocaçeşme is a village in the Gelibolu District of Çanakkale Province in Turkey. Its population is 164 (2021).
