= Kalealtı, Gelibolu =

Village in Turkey

Kalealtı
- Village
- Location in Turkey Kalealtı (Marmara)
- Coordinates: 40°41′43″N 26°48′34″E
- Country: Turkey
- Province: Çanakkale
- District: Gelibolu
- Population (2021): 126
- Time zone: UTC+3 (TRT)

Kalealtı is a village in the Gelibolu District of Çanakkale Province in Turkey. Its population is 126 (2021).
