= Demirkıran, Aşkale =

Village in Turkey

Demirkıran
- Neighbourhood
- Location in Turkey
- Coordinates: 39°57′46″N 40°40′56″E
- Country: Turkey
- Province: Erzurum
- District: Aşkale
- Population (2022): 56
- Time zone: UTC+3 (TRT)

Demirkıran is a neighbourhood in the municipality and district of Aşkale, Erzurum Province in Turkey. Its population is 56 (2022).
