= Cross-country skiing at the 2017 European Youth Olympic Winter Festival =

Cross-country skiing at the 2017 European Youth Olympic Winter Festival is held at the Palandoken Ski Centre in Erzurum, Turkey from 13 to 17 February 2017.

== Medal table ==
Rank	Nation	Gold	Silver	Bronze	Total
1	Russia (RUS)	5	3	3	11
2	Finland (FIN)	1	3	3	7
3	Slovenia (SLO)	1	0	0	1
4	Czech Republic (CZE)	0	1	0	1
5	France (FRA)	0	0	1	1
Totals (5 entries)		7	7	7	21

== Results ==
=== Boys events ===
Event	Gold		Silver		Bronze	
7.5 km Classic	Miska Poikkimäki (FIN)	17:51.4	Andrei Nekrasov (RUS)	17:56.7 +5.3	Petteri Koivisto (FIN)	18:25.9 +34.5
10 km Freestyle	Andrei Nekrasov (RUS)	21:37.3	Petteri Koivisto (FIN)	22:10.7 +33.4	Andrei Kuznetsov (RUS)	22:13.9 +36.6
Sprint	Andrei Nekrasov (RUS)	2:10.24	Miska Poikkimäki (FIN)	2:11.42 +1.18	Aleksandr Terentev (RUS)	2:11.68 +1.44

=== Ladies events ===
Event	Gold		Silver		Bronze	
5 km Classic	Anja Mandeljc (SLO)	13:49.3	Elena Kucheva (RUS)	14:04.9 +15.6	Aleksandra Trofimova (RUS)	14:17.3 +28.0
7.5 km Freestyle	Kristina Kuskova (RUS)	19:13.3	Elena Kucheva (RUS)	19:23.5 +10.2	Josefiina Böök (FIN)	19:34.6 +21.3
Sprint	Elena Kucheva (RUS)	2:32.25	Zuzana Holíková (CZE)	2:35.57 +3.32	Jasmin Kähärä (FIN)	2:36.11 +3.56

=== Mixed events ===
Event	Gold		Silver		Bronze	
Relay	Russia (RUS); Andrei Kuznetsov; Elena Kucheva; Andrei Nekrasov; Kristina Kuskova	50:53.1	Finland (FIN); Miska Poikkimäki; Jasmin Kähärä; Petteri Koivisto; Josefiina Böök	51:27.9 +34.8	France (FRA); Vincent Buiatti; Lou Reynaud; Emilien Louvrier; Mélissa Gal	51:52.9 +59.8
