= Sütlüce, Gelibolu =

Village in Turkey

Sütlüce
- Village
- Country: Turkey
- Province: Çanakkale
- District: Gelibolu
- Population (2021): 513
- Time zone: UTC+3 (TRT)

Sütlüce is a village in the Gelibolu District of Çanakkale Province in Turkey. Its population is 513 (2021).
