= Saptıran, Aşkale =

Village in Turkey

Saptıran
- Neighbourhood
- Location in Turkey
- Coordinates: 39°58′N 40°32′E
- Country: Turkey
- Province: Erzurum
- District: Aşkale
- Population (2022): 139
- Time zone: UTC+3 (TRT)

Saptıran is a neighbourhood in the municipality and district of Aşkale, Erzurum Province in Turkey. Its population is 139 (2022).
