= Çatören, Aşkale =

Village in Turkey

Çatören
- Neighbourhood
- Country: Turkey
- Province: Erzurum
- District: Aşkale
- Population (2022): 37
- Time zone: UTC+3 (TRT)

Çatören (also: Merkez Bucağı Çatören) is a neighbourhood in the municipality and district of Aşkale, Erzurum Province in Turkey. Its population is 37(2022).

== Population ==
Historical population
Year	Pop.	±% p.a.
1997	94	—
2007	71	−2.77%
2012	54	−5.33%
2017	39	−6.30%
2022	37	−1.05%
Source: 1997 census and TÜIK (2007-2022)
