= Bayramiç, Gelibolu =

Village in Turkey

Bayramiç
- Village
- Location in Turkey Bayramiç (Marmara)
- Coordinates: 40.7026°N 26.9092°E
- Country: Turkey
- Province: Çanakkale
- District: Gelibolu
- Population (2021): 601
- Time zone: UTC+3 (TRT)

Bayramiç is a village in the Gelibolu District of Çanakkale Province in Turkey. Its population is 601 (2021).
