= Abdalcık, Aşkale =

Village in Turkey

Abdalcık
- Neighbourhood
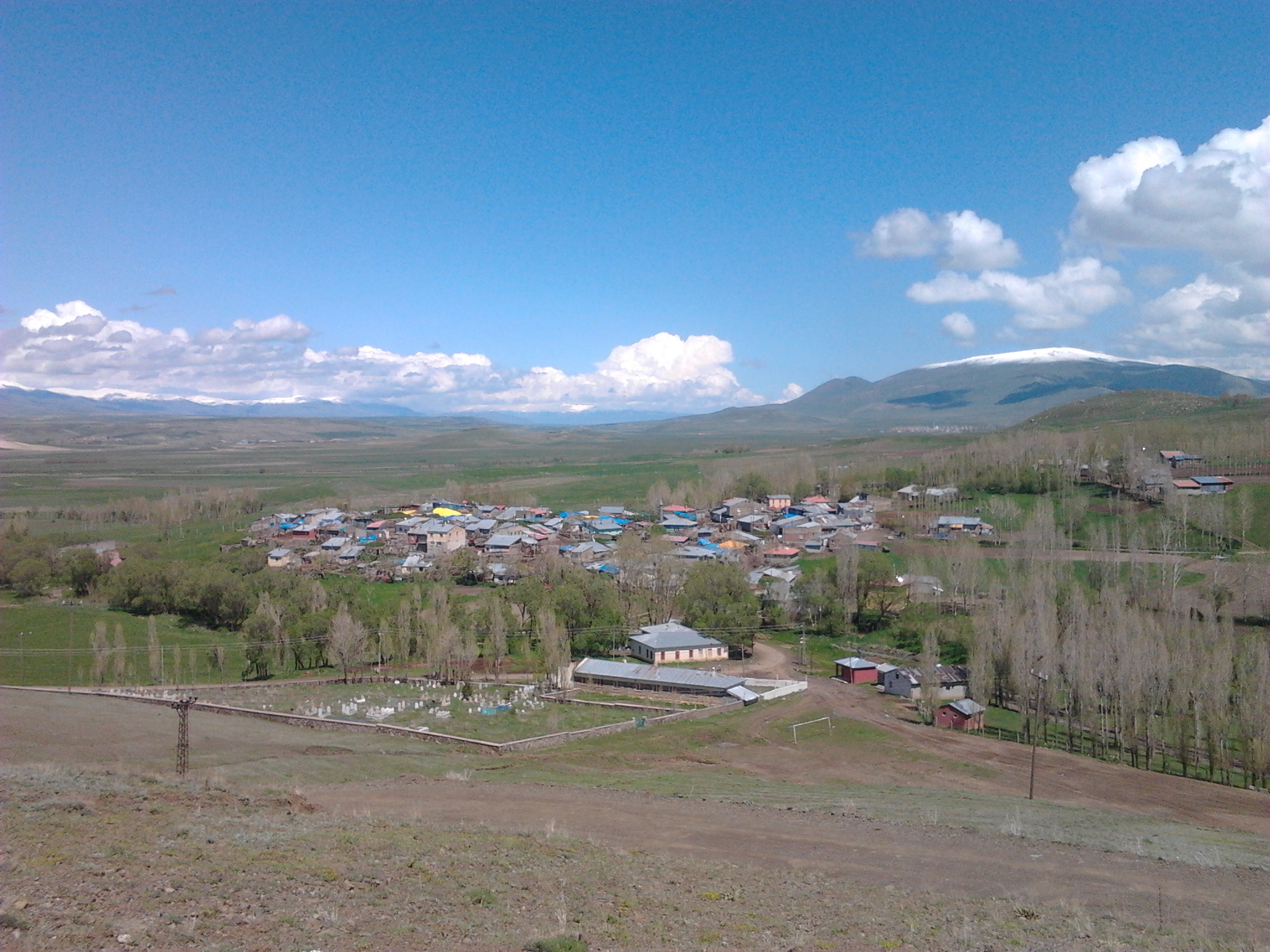

- Location within Turkey
- Coordinates: 39°53′N 40°47′E
- Country: Turkey
- Province: Erzurum
- District: Aşkale
- Population (2022): 284
- Time zone: UTC+3 (TRT)
- Postal code: 25500

Abdalcık is a neighbourhood in the municipality and district of Aşkale, Erzurum Province in Turkey. Its population is 284 (2022).
