= Gelibolu District =

District of Çanakkale Province, Turkey

- District
- Map showing Gelibolu District in Çanakkale Province

- Location in Turkey Gelibolu District (Marmara)
- Coordinates: 40°25′N 26°40′E
- Country: Turkey
- Province: Çanakkale
- Seat: Gelibolu

Government
  - Kaymakam: Bekir Abacı
- Area: 823 km^{2} (318 sq mi)
- Population (2021): 44,598
  - Density: 54/km^{2} (140/sq mi)
- Time zone: UTC+3 (TRT)
- Website: www.gelibolu.gov.tr

Gelibolu District is a district of the Çanakkale Province of Turkey. Its seat is the town of Gelibolu. Its area is 823 km^{2}, and its population is 44,598 (2021).

== Composition ==
There are three municipalities in Gelibolu District:

- Evreşe
- Gelibolu
- Kavakköy

There are 26 villages in Gelibolu District:

- Adilhan
- Bayırköy
- Bayramiç
- Bolayır
- Burhanlı
- Cevizli
- Çokal
- Cumalı
- Değirmendüzü
- Demirtepe
- Fındıklı
- Güneyli
- Ilgardere
- Kalealtı
- Karainebeyli
- Kavaklı
- Kocaçeşme
- Koruköy
- Ocaklı
- Pazarlı
- Şadıllı
- Süleymaniye
- Sütlüce
- Tayfurköy
- Yeniköy
- Yülüce
