= Bayırköy, Gelibolu =

Village in Turkey

Bayırköy
- Village
- Location in Turkey Bayırköy (Marmara)
- Coordinates: 40.3542°N 26.5857°E
- Country: Turkey
- Province: Çanakkale
- District: Gelibolu
- Population (2021): 548
- Time zone: UTC+3 (TRT)

Bayırköy is a village in the Gelibolu District of Çanakkale Province in Turkey. Its population is 548 (2021).
