= Fındıklı, Gelibolu =

Village in Turkey

Fındıklı
- Village
- Country: Turkey
- Province: Çanakkale
- District: Gelibolu
- Population (2021): 202
- Time zone: UTC+3 (TRT)

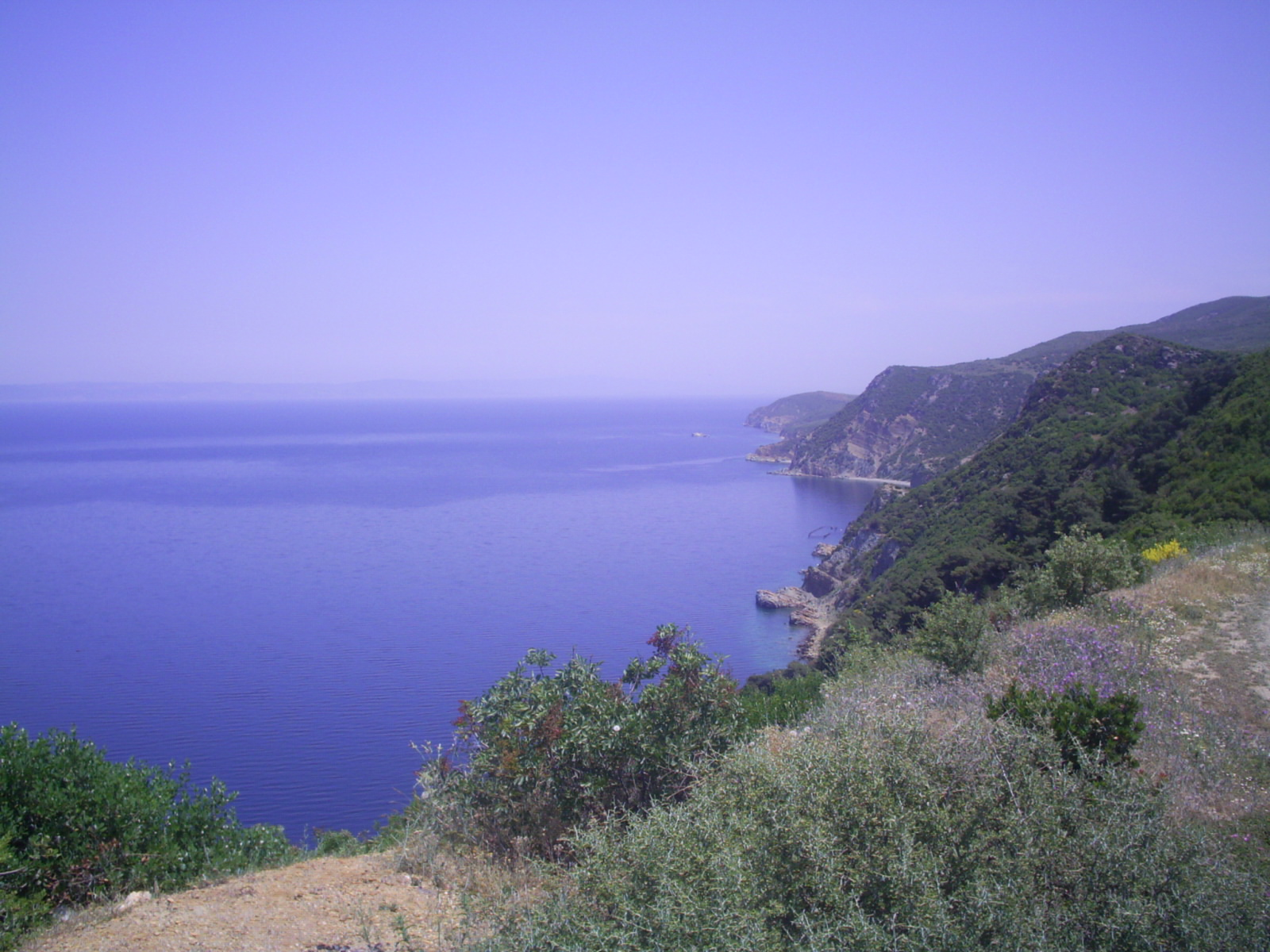
Mountain view

Fındıklı is a village in the Gelibolu District of Çanakkale Province in Turkey. Its population is 202 (2021).
