= Güneyli, Gelibolu =

Village in Turkey

Güneyli
- Village
- Country: Turkey
- Province: Çanakkale
- District: Gelibolu
- Population (2021): 732
- Time zone: UTC+3 (TRT)

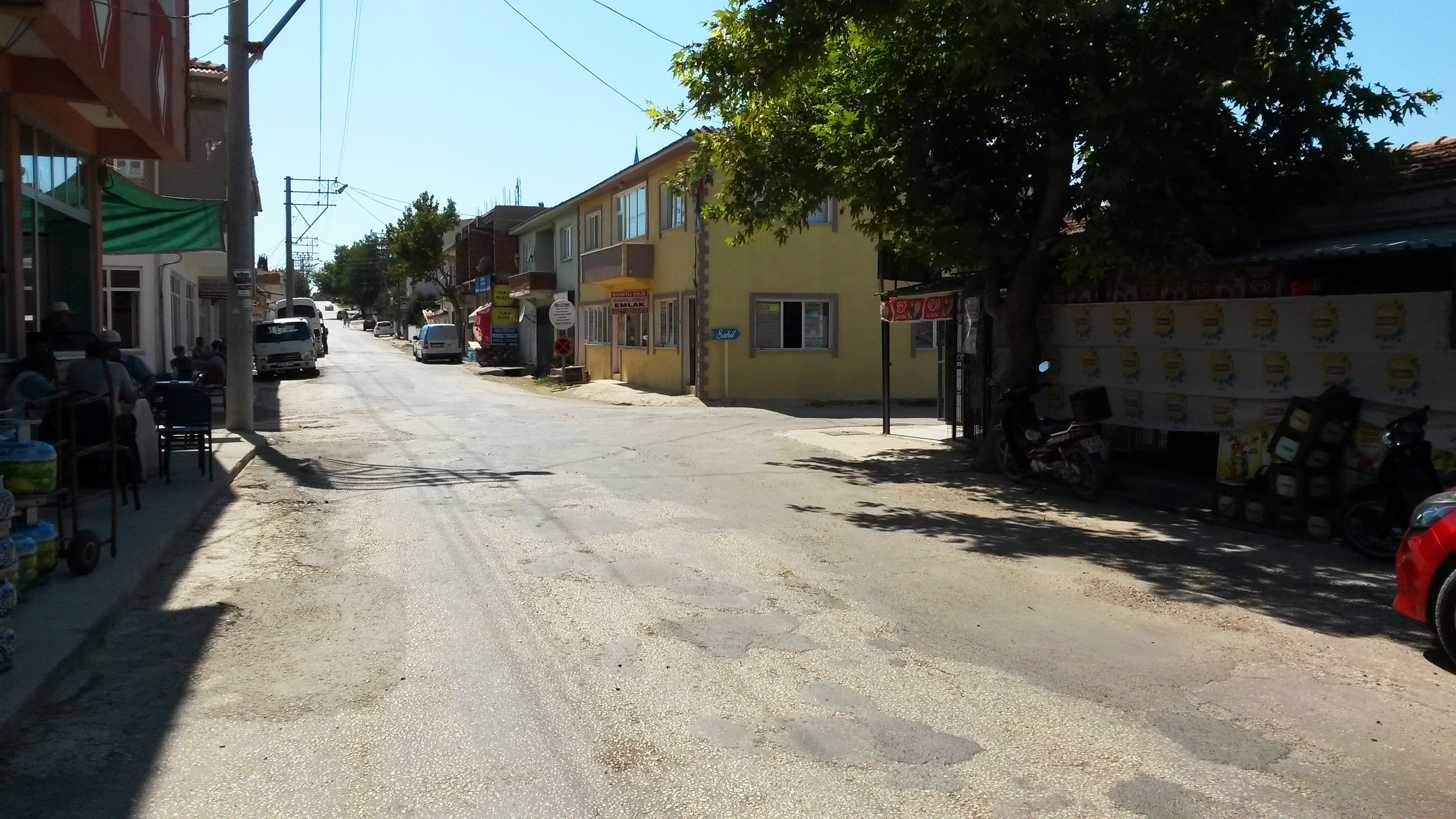

Güneyli is a village in the Gelibolu District of Çanakkale Province in Turkey. Its population is 732 (2021).
