= Ballıtaş, Aşkale =

Village in Turkey

Ballıtaş
- Neighbourhood
- Location in Turkey
- Coordinates: 40°01′20″N 40°43′44″E
- Country: Turkey
- Province: Erzurum
- District: Aşkale
- Population (2022): 165
- Time zone: UTC+3 (TRT)

Ballıtaş is a neighbourhood in the municipality and district of Aşkale, Erzurum Province in Turkey. Its population is 165 (2022).
