= Ilgardere, Gelibolu =

Village in Turkey

Ilgardere
- Village
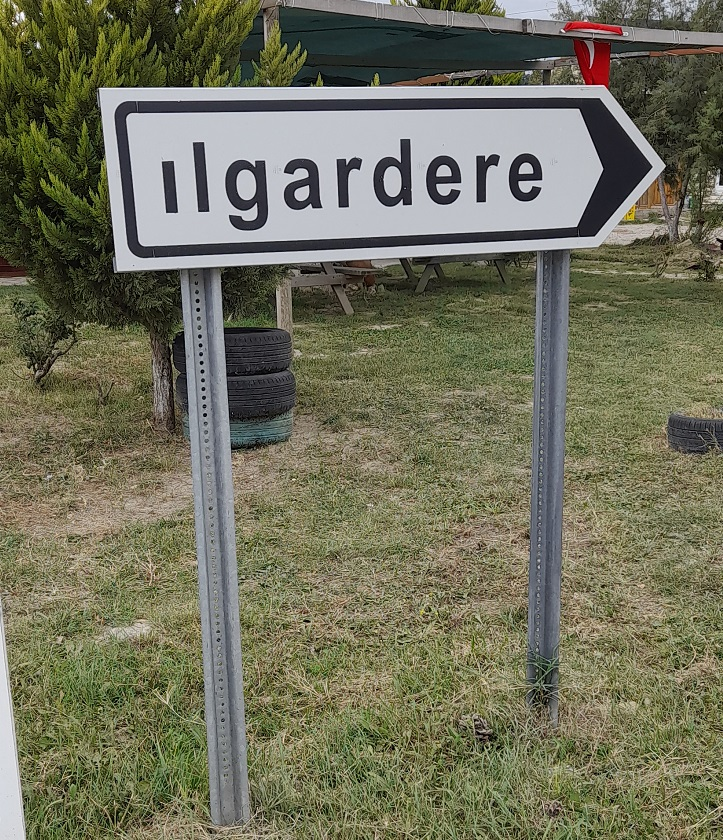

- Location within Turkey Location within Marmara
- Coordinates: 40°18′14″N 26°28′39″E
- Country: Turkey
- Province: Çanakkale
- District: Gelibolu
- Population (2021): 253
- Time zone: UTC+3 (TRT)

Ilgardere is a village in the Gelibolu District of Çanakkale Province in Turkey. Its population is 253 (2021).
