= Tozluca, Aşkale =

Village in Turkey

Tozluca
- Neighbourhood
- Location in Turkey
- Coordinates: 39°45′10″N 40°39′40″E
- Country: Turkey
- Province: Erzurum
- District: Aşkale
- Population (2022): 22
- Time zone: UTC+3 (TRT)

Tozluca is a neighbourhood in the municipality and district of Aşkale, Erzurum Province in Turkey. Its population is 22 (2022).
