= Evreşe =

- Municipality
- Location in Turkey Evreşe (Marmara)
- Coordinates: 40°39′55″N 26°52′49″E
- Country: Turkey
- Province: Çanakkale
- District: Gelibolu
- Population (2021): 2,098
- Time zone: UTC+3 (TRT)

Evreşe is a town (belde) in the Gelibolu District, Çanakkale Province, Turkey. Its population is 2,098 (2021).
