= Burhanlı, Gelibolu =

Village in Turkey

Burhanlı
- Village
- Location in Turkey Burhanlı (Marmara)
- Coordinates: 40.3069°N 26.5593°E
- Country: Turkey
- Province: Çanakkale
- District: Gelibolu
- Population (2021): 226
- Time zone: UTC+3 (TRT)

Burhanlı is a village in the Gelibolu District of Çanakkale Province in Turkey. Its population is 226 (2021).
