= Athletics at the 1999 European Youth Summer Olympic Days =

The athletics competition at the 1999 European Youth Summer Olympic Days was held from July 11 to 14 . The events took place in Esbjerg, Denmark. Boys and girls born 1982 or 1983 or later participated 24 track and field events, divided equally between the sexes. The programme was reduced that year, with the 1500 metres, 400 metres hurdles and discus throw events being dropped for both boys and girls. It marked the first time that girls' pole vault and the 3000 metres were contested.

== Medal summary ==
=== Men ===
Event	Gold		Silver		Bronze	
100 metres	Steeve Toris (FRA)	10.85	Guillermo Vidal (ESP)	10.88	Harry Thonney (SUI)	11.02
200 metres (wind: +2.1 m/s)	Dwayne Grant (GBR)	21.69 w	Tomi Javanainen (FIN)	21.78 w	Luciano Mazzilli (ITA)	21.81 w
400 metres	Dmitriy Petrov (RUS)	48.49	Simon Tunnicliffe (GBR)	48.49	Giampietro Pavan (ITA)	48.55
800 metres	Cosimo Caliandro (ITA)	1:53.04	Pavel Belskikh (RUS)	1:53.15	Bas Eefting (NED)	1:53.48
3000 metres	Ümit Koclardan (TUR)	8:40.50	Robin Vohlídal (CZE)	8:41.08	Krisztián Kovács (HUN)	8:41.56
110 metres hurdles	Philip Nossmy (SWE)	13.64	Nathan Palmer (GBR)	13.94	Stefanos Ioannou (CYP)	14.05
4 × 100 m relay	Great Britain (GBR)	41.32	Finland (FIN)	42.25	Croatia (CRO)	42.35
High jump	Vytautas Seliukas (LTU)	2.11 m	Mickaël Hanany (FRA)	2.11 m	Filippo Campioli (ITA)	2.08 m
Pole vault	Joël Soler (FRA)	4.95 m	Artyom Matienko (UKR)	4.90 m	Kevin Rans (BEL)	4.80 m
Long jump	Laurent Pernic (FRA)	7.46 m	Marijo Baković (CRO)	7.40 m	Lars Jacob Woie (NOR)	7.21 m
Shot put	Marco Fortes (POR)	18.98 m	Cyril Viudes (FRA)	18.23 m	Milan Seremet (CRO)	17.97 m
Javelin throw	Andreas Thorkildsen (NOR)	69.88 m	Peter Zupanc (SLO)	62.83 m	Martin Klíma (CZE)	60.34 m

=== Women ===
Event	Gold		Silver		Bronze	
100 metres	Amélie Huyghes (FRA)	11.89	Yekaterina Kondratyeva (RUS)	12.05	Emma Rienas (SWE)	12.11
200 metres	Yelena Yakovleva (RUS)	23.99	Vicki Barr (GBR) Cleophe Sabine (FRA)	24.54	Not awarded	
400 metres	Rebecca Scotcher (GBR)	54.94	Simone Murer (SUI)	55.15	Gaelle Nana (FRA)	55.35
800 metres	Mieke Geens (BEL)	2:08.42	Aleksandra Kuzminskaya (UKR)	2:08.77	Krisztina Papp (HUN)	2:10.23
3000 metres	Marina Munćan (YUG)	9:27.70	Riina Tolonen (FIN)	9:32.26	Xenia Luxem (BEL)	9:41.60
100 metres hurdles	Nagore Iraola (ESP)	13.68	Helen Worsey (GBR)	13.72	Marie Dia (FRA)	13.77
4 × 100 m relay	France (FRA)	47.36	Sweden (SWE)	47.85	Belgium (BEL)	48.12
High jump	Carolina Klüft (SWE)	1.80 m	Ellen Cochuyt (BEL) Alina Dinu (ROU)	1.75 m	Not awarded	
Pole vault	Anastasia Kirianova (RUS)	3.80 m	Francesca Zanini (ITA)	3.80 m	Maria Rendin (SWE)	3.75 m
Long jump	Narayane Dossévi (FRA)	6.19 m	Viktoriya Rybalko (UKR)	6.10 m	Živile Šikšnelyte (LTU)	5.92 m
Shot put	Chiara Rosa (ITA)	14.51 m	Ekateríni Potiri (GRE)	13.98 m	Claudia Villeneuve (FRA)	13.89 m
Javelin throw	Marion Bonaudo (FRA)	48.92 m	Maja Janjić (YUG)	46.84 m	Inga Kožarenoka (LAT)	46.55 m
