= Karainebeyli, Gelibolu =

Village in Turkey

Karainebeyli
- Village
- Location in Turkey Karainebeyli (Marmara)
- Coordinates: 40°21′N 26°26′E
- Country: Turkey
- Province: Çanakkale
- District: Gelibolu
- Population (2021): 300
- Time zone: UTC+3 (TRT)

Karainebeyli is a village in the Gelibolu District of Çanakkale Province in Turkey. Its population is 300 (2021).
