= Hygassos =

Town of the Rhodian Peraea in ancient Caria

Coordinates: 36°44′22″N 28°07′15″E

Hygassos was a town of the Rhodian Peraea in ancient Caria, that was inhabited in the Hellenistic period. The name does not appear in inscriptions, but the demonym (Ancient Greek: Ὑγασσέως) occurs frequently in ancient epigraphy.

Its site is located on Losta Bay, Bozburun Peninsula, Asiatic Turkey.
