= Yumruveren, Aşkale =

Village in Turkey

Yumruveren
- Neighbourhood
- Location in Turkey
- Coordinates: 39°44′N 40°43′E
- Country: Turkey
- Province: Erzurum
- District: Aşkale
- Population (2022): 80
- Time zone: UTC+3 (TRT)

Yumruveren is a neighbourhood in the municipality and district of Aşkale, Erzurum Province in Turkey. Its population is 80 (2022).
