= Koruköy, Gelibolu =

Village in Turkey

Koruköy
- Village
- Country: Turkey
- Province: Çanakkale
- District: Gelibolu
- Population (2021): 410
- Time zone: UTC+3 (TRT)

Koruköy is a village in the Gelibolu District of Çanakkale Province in Turkey. Its population is 410 (2021).
