= Swimming at the 1991 European Youth Olympic Days =

- Host city: Brussels, Belgium
- Date: July 19–20, 1991
- Nations: 50
- Events: 26

Swimming at the 1991 European Youth Olympic Days was held in Brussels, Belgium.

== Medal summary ==
=== Events ===
==== Boys' events ====
| Games | Gold | | Silver | | Bronze | |
|---|---|---|---|---|---|---|
Freestyle
| 100 m freestyle | Jerome Schembri; France | 54.90 | Tomasz Mazurek; Poland | 55.54 | Jose Maria Rojano; Spain | 55.60 |
| 400 m freestyle | Jerome Schembri; France | 4:06.76 | Petr Kratochvil; Czechoslovakia | 4:07.62 | Alessandro Berti; Italy | 4:12.11 |
Backstroke
| 100 m backstroke | Derya Büyükuncu; Turkey | 57.21 | Alessandro Cambiati; Italy | 1:01.27 | Daniel Carlsson; Sweden | 1:01.81 |
| 200 m backstroke | Derya Büyükuncu; Turkey | 2:05.64 | Tomasz Piotrowski; Poland | 2:11.91 | Sergey Ostapchuk; Soviet Union | 2:12.04 |
Breastroke
| 100 m breaststroke | Fabio Farabegoli; Italy | 1:08.81 | Andres Ivanov; Romania | 1:08.93 | Chong-Woo Chiang; Netherlands | 1:09.00 |
| 200 m breaststroke | Andrew Ayres; Great Britain | 2:26.42 | Fabio Farabegoli; Italy | 2:26.70 | Andres Ivanov; Romania | 2:28.22 |
Butterfly
| 100 m butterfly | Martin Wagner; Czechoslovakia | 59.14 | Konstantin Andriushin; Soviet Union | 59.57 | Sebastien Sauvage; France | 59:60 |
| 200 m butterfly | Konstantin Andriushin; Soviet Union | 2:06.94 | Paul Lafimer; Great Britain | 2:11.48 | David Abrard; France | 2:13.08 |
Medley
| 200 m individual medley | Petr Kratochvil; Czechoslovakia | 2:11.76 | Rubén Rodríguez; Spain | 2:16.09 | George Doru Stirbei; Romania | 2:18.04 |
Relays
| 4 × 100 m freestyle relay | France | 3:41.45 | Great Britain | 3:41.63 | Sweden | 3:45.63 |
| 4 × 100 m medley relay | Italy | 4:05.58 | France | 4:06.84 | Spain | 4:07.08 |

==== Girls' events ====
| Games | Gold | | Silver | | Bronze | |
|---|---|---|---|---|---|---|
Freestyle
| 100 m freestyle | Marie Ulves; Sweden | 1:01.49 | Virginie Delgrange; France | 1:01.50 | Anna Reichman; Soviet Union | 1:01.55 |
| 400 m freestyle | Sylvie Rouanet; France | 4:33.60 | Cristina Elena Vintilia; Romania | 4:33.94 | Emma Olsson; Sweden | 4:41.48 |
Backstroke
| 100 m backstroke | Marie-Helene Agostini; France | 1:09.35 | Idoia Amorrortu; Spain | 1:10.52 | Petra Chaves; Portugal | 1:10.56 |
| 200 m backstroke | Marie-Helene Agostini; France | 2:27.21 | Petra Chaves; Portugal | 2:28.14 | Tatyana Litovchenko; Soviet Union | 3:31.12 |
Breaststroke
| 100 m breaststroke | Neus Coma; Spain | 1:18.71 | Irina Afanasenko; Soviet Union | 1:19.95 | Eleonora Ghezzi; Italy | 1:20.31 |
| 200 m breaststroke | Susan Rolph; Great Britain | 2:45.81 | Neus Coma; Spain | 2:46.31 | Nadège Cliton; France | 2:47.75 |
Butterfly
| 100 m butterfly | Madalina Badea; Romania | 1:06.75 | Elena Koslova; Soviet Union | 1:07.23 | Stephanie Nevado; France | 1:07.29 |
| 200 m butterfly | Susan Rolph; Great Britain | 2:26.21 | Cristina Elena Vintilia; Romania | 2:28.13 | Ana Barda; Spain | 2:29.32 |
Medley
| 200 m individual medley | Mariska Van Harn; Netherlands | 2:29.07 | Annette Prechtl; Austria | 2:29.38 | Nathalie Virgel; France | 2:29.51 |
Relays
| 4 × 100 m freestyle relay | Sweden | 4:06.98 | Great Britain | 4:07.40 | Italy | 4:13.18 |
| 4 × 100 m medley relay | France | 4:38.24 | Soviet Union | 4:41.57 | Great Britain | 4:42.60 |
