= Gökçebük, Aşkale =

Village in Turkey

Gökçebük
- Neighbourhood
- Location in Turkey
- Coordinates: 39°58′27″N 40°50′03″E
- Country: Turkey
- Province: Erzurum
- District: Aşkale
- Population (2022): 287
- Time zone: UTC+3 (TRT)

Gökçebük is a neighbourhood in the municipality and district of Aşkale, Erzurum Province in Turkey. Its population is 287 (2022).
