= Cevizli, Gelibolu =

Village in Turkey

Cevizli
- Village
- Country: Turkey
- Province: Çanakkale
- District: Gelibolu
- Population (2021): 91
- Time zone: UTC+3 (TRT)

Cevizli is a village in the Gelibolu District of Çanakkale Province in Turkey. Its population is 91 (2021).
