= Gümüşseren, Aşkale =

Village in Turkey

Gümüşseren
- Neighbourhood

- Location within Turkey
- Coordinates: 39°54′57″N 40°39′57″E
- Country: Turkey
- Province: Erzurum
- District: Aşkale
- Population (2022): 156
- Time zone: UTC+3 (TRT)

Gümüşseren is a neighbourhood in the municipality and district of Aşkale, Erzurum Province in Turkey. Its population is 156 (2022).
