= Pırnakapan, Aşkale =

Village in Turkey

Pırnakapan
- Neighbourhood
- Location in Turkey
- Coordinates: 39°58′N 40°34′E
- Country: Turkey
- Province: Erzurum
- District: Aşkale
- Population (2022): 84
- Time zone: UTC+3 (TRT)

Pırnakapan is a neighbourhood in the municipality and district of Aşkale, Erzurum Province in Turkey. Its population is 84 (2022).
