= Küçükgeçit, Aşkale =

Village in Turkey

Küçükgeçit
- Neighbourhood
- Location in Turkey
- Coordinates: 39°56′25″N 40°46′00″E
- Country: Turkey
- Province: Erzurum
- District: Aşkale
- Population (2022): 229
- Time zone: UTC+3 (TRT)

Küçükgeçit is a neighbourhood in the municipality and district of Aşkale, Erzurum Province in Turkey. Its population is 229 (2022).
