= Yülüce, Gelibolu =

Village in Turkey

Yülüce
- Village
- Location in Turkey Yülüce (Marmara)
- Coordinates: 40°41′N 26°58′E
- Country: Turkey
- Province: Çanakkale
- District: Gelibolu
- Population (2021): 426
- Time zone: UTC+3 (TRT)

Yülüce is a village in the Gelibolu District of Çanakkale Province in Turkey. Its population is 426 (2021).
