= Düzyurt, Aşkale =

Village in Turkey

Düzyurt
- Neighbourhood
- Location in Turkey
- Coordinates: 39.838056°N 40.828333°E
- Country: Turkey
- Province: Erzurum
- District: Aşkale
- Population (2022): 26
- Time zone: UTC+3 (TRT)

Düzyurt is a neighbourhood in the municipality and district of Aşkale, Erzurum Province in Turkey. Its population is 26 (2022).
