= Bozburun Peninsula =

Peninsula in Turkey

Bozburun Peninsula (Turkish: Bozburun Yarımadası) is a peninsula in southwest Turkey. In antiquity the cape at its extremity was called Aphrodisias (Ancient Greek: Ἀφροδισιάς).

It is between the Aegean and Mediterranean seas. Datça Peninsula is to the north and the Greek island Symi is to the west. It is named after the town Bozburun which is located at 36°41′N 28°03′E. The peninsula is a part of Marmaris ilçe (district) of Muğla Province. The peninsula is mountainous, one notable peak was called Mount Phoenix in antiquity, and modernly Karayüksek Dağ; this peak marked the beginning of the Rhodian Peraia. The coastline of the peninsula is highly indented with many secondary peninsulas, bays and islets. In the peninsula there are ruins of ancient settlements such as Bybassos, Hygassos, Kastabos, Tymnos, Syrna, Thysanos, Phoenix, Amos and Kasara.
