= Merdivenköy, Aşkale =

Village in Turkey

Merdivenköy
- Neighbourhood
- Location in Turkey
- Coordinates: 39°52′58″N 40°49′14″E
- Country: Turkey
- Province: Erzurum
- District: Aşkale
- Population (2022): 399
- Time zone: UTC+3 (TRT)

Merdivenköy is a neighbourhood in the municipality and district of Aşkale, Erzurum Province in Turkey. Its population is 399 (2022).
