= Çayköy, Aşkale =

Village in Turkey

Çayköy
- Neighbourhood
- Location in Turkey
- Coordinates: 39.950556°N 40.819444°E
- Country: Turkey
- Province: Erzurum
- District: Aşkale
- Population (2022): 554
- Time zone: UTC+3 (TRT)

Çayköy is a neighbourhood in the municipality and district of Aşkale, Erzurum Province in Turkey. Its population is 554 (2022).
