= Bulgaz Bay =

Bay on the southwest coast of Turkey in Asia

Coordinates: 36.553099°N 30.3003095°E

Bulgaz Bay (Turkish: Bulgaz Koyu), formerly Bozburun Bay, anciently Thymnias, is a bay on the southwest coast of Turkey in Asia, an indentation of the Bozburun Peninsula. At the head of the bay is the town of Bozburun. The bay was noted by several ancient geographers, the name evidently coming from the ancient town of Tymnos which was sited near modern Bozburun town.
