= Altıntaş, Aşkale =

Village in Turkey

Altıntaş
- Neighbourhood
- Location in Turkey
- Coordinates: 39°57′21″N 40°23′26″E
- Country: Turkey
- Province: Erzurum
- District: Aşkale
- Population (2022): 47
- Time zone: UTC+3 (TRT)

Altıntaş is a neighbourhood in the municipality and district of Aşkale, Erzurum Province in Turkey. Its population is 47 (2022).
