= Aşkale =

- District and municipality
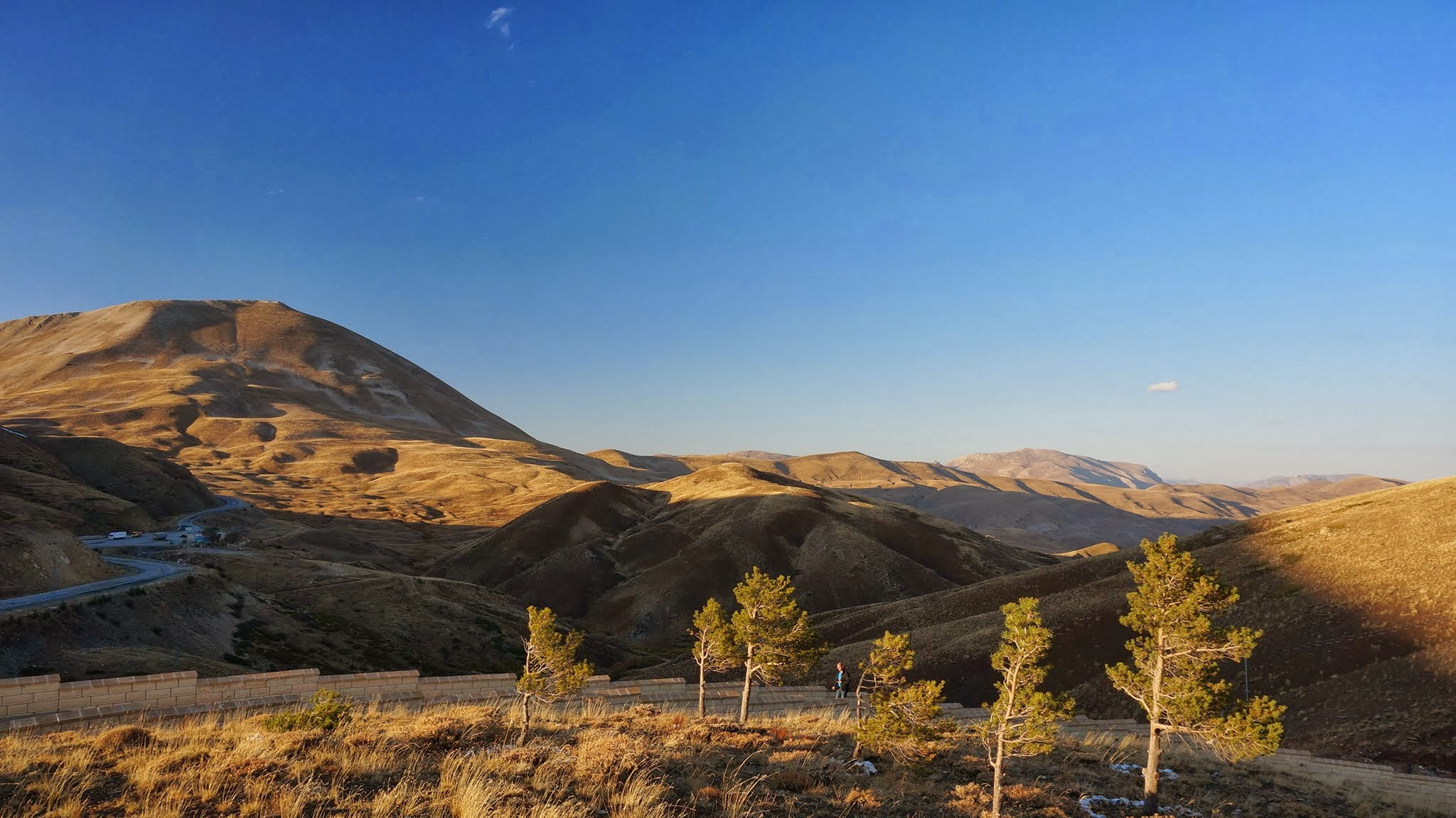
- Bozburun landscape, Aşkale

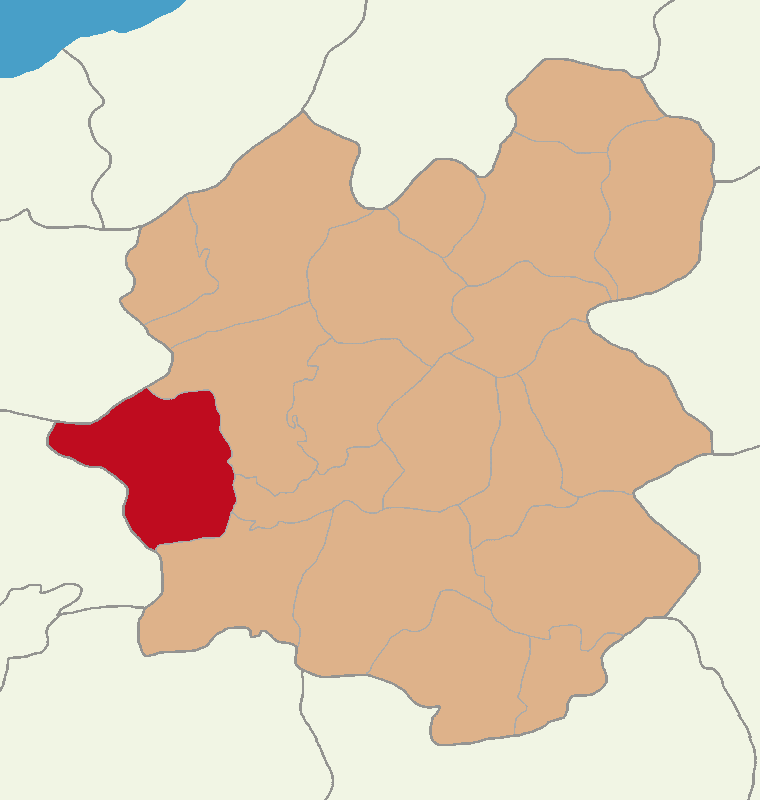
- Map showing Aşkale District in Erzurum Province

- Location within Turkey
- Coordinates: 39°55′16″N 40°41′41″E
- Country: Turkey
- Province: Erzurum

Government
  - Mayor: Şenor Polat (AKP)
- Area: 1,507 km^{2} (582 sq mi)
- Population (2022): 21,494
  - Density: 14.26/km^{2} (36.94/sq mi)
- Time zone: UTC+3 (TRT)
- Postal code: 25500
- Area code: 0442
- Climate: Dfb
- Website: www.askale.bel.tr

Aşkale is a municipality and district of Erzurum Province, Turkey. Its area is 1,507 km^{2}, and its population is 21,494 (2022). The mayor is Şenor Polat (AKP).

The majority of the district is populated by Turks and a small minority by Kurds. There is also a presence of Meskhetian Turks and Karapapakhs.

Kandilli Ski Resort, which hosts cross-country skiing and biathlon competitions at some international winter sports events, is situated in Aşkale.

== Labour camps for non-Muslims ==
In 1942, the Varlık Vergisi (Turkish: [vɑɾˈɫɯk ˈvæɾɟisi], "wealth tax" or "capital tax") was imposed on the minority non-Muslim citizens of Turkey (mainly Jews, Greeks, Armenians, and Levantines. Those unable to pay had to work off their debt in labor camps in Aşkale. Five thousand were sent to the Aşkale labor camp. The law was repealed on 15 March 1944, and minority citizens who were at the labour camps were sent back to their homes.

== Composition ==
There are 75 neighbourhoods in Aşkale District:

- 3 Mart
- Abdalcık
- Akören
- Altıntaş
- Bahçelievler
- Ballıtaş
- Bozburun
- Büyükgeçit
- Cahitbayar
- Çarşı
- Çatalbayır
- Çatören
- Çayköy
- Çiftlik
- Dağyurdu
- Dallı
- Demirkıran
- Dereköy
- Düzyurt
- Emek
- Esentepe
- Eyüpoğlu
- Gökçebük
- Gölören
- Güllüdere
- Gümüşseren
- Güneyçam
- Gürkaynak
- Hacıbekir
- Hacıhamza
- Hacımahmut
- Halitpaşa
- Hatuncuk
- Haydarhacı
- İstasyon
- Kandilli
- Kapıkale
- Karahasan
- Karasu
- Kavurmaçukuru
- Kıbrıs
- Koçbaba
- Koşapınar
- Küçükgeçit
- Küçükova
- Kükürtlü
- Kurtmahmut
- Merdivenköy
- Meydan
- Mezrea
- Musadanışman
- Nahiye Gölören
- Ocaklı
- Ovacık
- Özler
- Pırnakapan
- Şafak
- Saptıran
- Sarıbaba
- Sazlı
- Taşağıl
- Taşlıçayır
- Tecer
- Tepsicik
- Tokça
- Topalçavuş
- Tosunlu
- Tozluca
- Turaç
- Yaylaköy
- Yaylayolu
- Yaylımlı
- Yeniköy Halitpaşa
- Yeşilova
- Yumruveren
