= Yeniköy, Gelibolu =

Village in Turkey

Yeniköy
- Village
- Country: Turkey
- Province: Çanakkale
- District: Gelibolu
- Population (2021): 549
- Time zone: UTC+3 (TRT)

Yeniköy is a village in the Gelibolu District of Çanakkale Province in Turkey. Its population is 549 (2021).
