= Kurtmahmut, Aşkale =

Village in Turkey

Kurtmahmut
- Neighbourhood
- Country: Turkey
- Province: Erzurum
- District: Aşkale
- Population (2022): 34
- Time zone: UTC+3 (TRT)

Kurtmahmut is a neighbourhood in the municipality and district of Aşkale, Erzurum Province in Turkey. Its population is 34 (2022).
