= Kapıkale, Aşkale =

Village in Turkey

Kapıkale
- Neighbourhood
- Location in Turkey
- Coordinates: 40°03′N 40°35′E
- Country: Turkey
- Province: Erzurum
- District: Aşkale
- Population (2022): 101
- Time zone: UTC+3 (TRT)

Kapıkale is a neighbourhood in the municipality and district of Aşkale, Erzurum Province in Turkey. Its population is 101 (2022).
