= Kavaklı, Gelibolu =

Village in Turkey

Kavaklı
- Village
- Country: Turkey
- Province: Çanakkale
- District: Gelibolu
- Population (2021): 121
- Time zone: UTC+3 (TRT)

Kavaklı is a village in the Gelibolu District of Çanakkale Province in Turkey. Its population is 121 (2021).
