= Yeniköy Halitpaşa, Aşkale =

Village in Turkey

Yeniköy Halitpaşa
- Neighbourhood
- Location in Turkey
- Coordinates: 39°51′22″N 40°41′44″E
- Country: Turkey
- Province: Erzurum
- District: Aşkale
- Population (2022): 481
- Time zone: UTC+3 (TRT)

Yeniköy Halitpaşa is a neighbourhood in the municipality and district of Aşkale, Erzurum Province in Turkey. Its population is 481 (2022).
