= Bozburun, Aşkale =

Village in Turkey

Bozburun
- Neighbourhood
- Location in Turkey
- Coordinates: 39.988611°N 40.5525°E
- Country: Turkey
- Province: Erzurum
- District: Aşkale
- Population (2022): 20
- Time zone: UTC+3 (TRT)

Bozburun is a neighbourhood in the municipality and district of Aşkale, Erzurum Province in Turkey. Its population is 20 (2022).

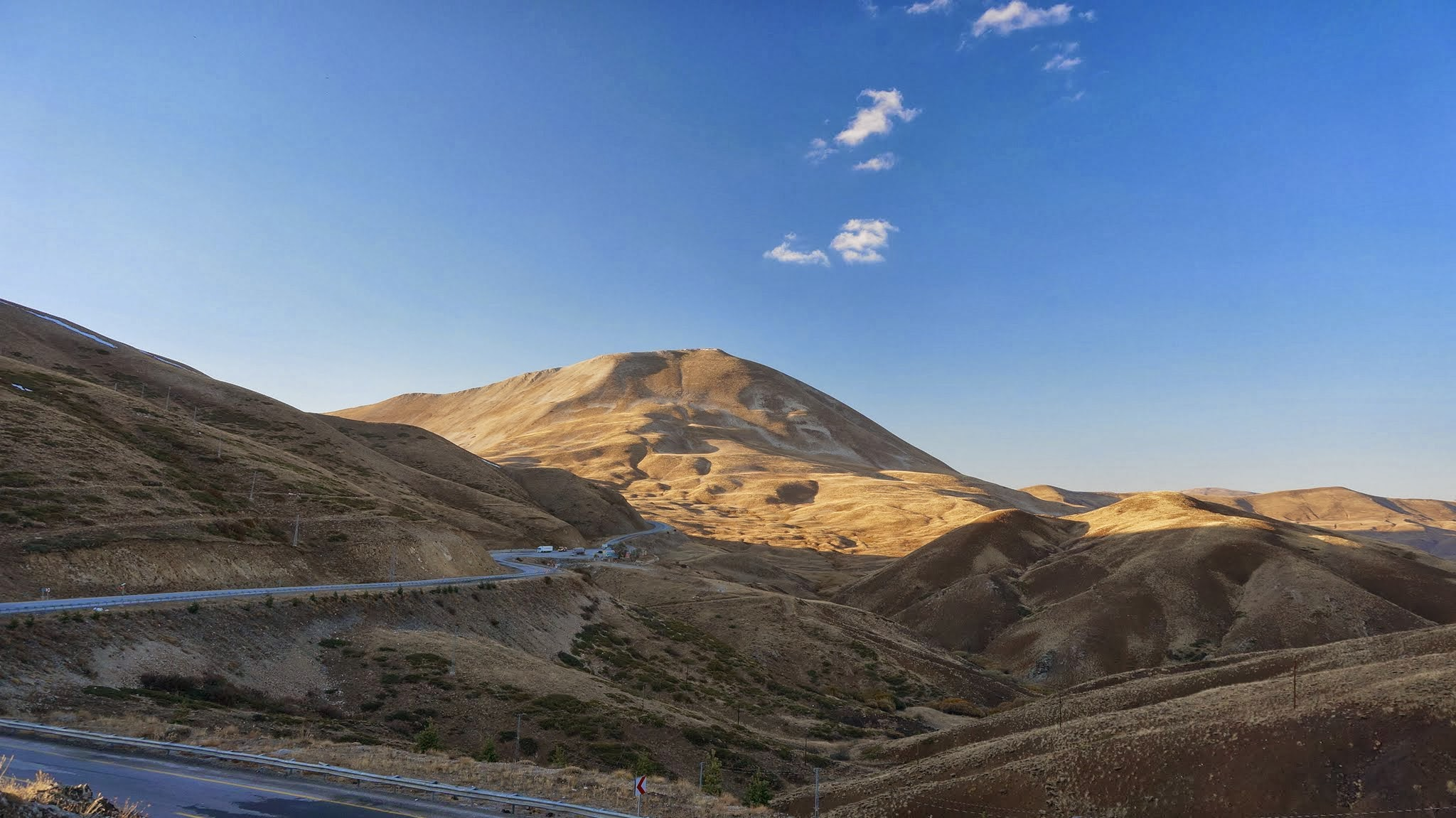
Bozburun landscape
