= Sazlıçökek, Sur =

Village in Turkey

Sazlıçökek
- Settlement
- Location in Turkey
- Coordinates: 37.91067°N 40.36779°E
- Country: Turkey
- Province: Diyarbakır
- District: Sur
- Time zone: UTC+3 (TRT)

Sazlıçökek (Kurdish: Tilgaz; Syriac: Talġāz) (Note: Also known as Talgaz, Telhas, Telkhas, Télkhas, Telgaz, Tilgaz, Tılğaz, or Tilkhas.) is a settlement in the municipality and district of Sur, Diyarbakır Province in Turkey. It is populated by Kurds.

== History ==
Talġāz (today called Sazlıçökek) was historically inhabited by Syriac Orthodox Christians and Armenians. In the Syriac Orthodox patriarchal register of dues of 1870, it was recorded that the village had 7 households, who did not pay any dues, and did not have a church or a priest. There were 2 Armenian hearths in 1880. The village was attacked and plundered during the massacres in the Diyarbekir vilayet in 1895.

The village was located in the Diyarbakır central district (merkez kaza) in the Diyarbakır sanjak in the Diyarbekir vilayet in c. 1900. In 1914, it was populated by 200 Syriacs, according to the list presented to the Paris Peace Conference by the Assyro-Chaldean delegation.

== Bibliography ==
- Abed Mshiho Neman of Qarabash (2021) [1918]. Sayfo – An Account of the Assyrian Genocide. Translated by Michael Abdalla; Łukasz Kiczko. Edinburgh University Press.
- Bcheiry, Iskandar (2009). The Syriac Orthodox Patriarchal Register of Dues of 1870: An Unpublished Historical Document from the Late Ottoman Period. Gorgias Press.
- Gaunt, David (2006). Massacres, Resistance, Protectors: Muslim-Christian Relations in Eastern Anatolia during World War I. Gorgias Press.
- Jongerden, Joost; Verheij, Jelle, eds. (2012). Social Relations in Ottoman Diyarbekir, 1870-1915. Brill.
- Kévorkian, Raymond H. (2006). "Demographic Changes in the Armenian Population of Diarbekir, 1895-1914". In Richard G. Hovannisian (ed.). Armenian Tigranakert/Diarbekir and Edessa/Urfa. Mazda Publishers.
- Tîgrîs, Amed; Çakar, Yıldız (2012). Amed : erdnîgarî, dîrok, çand (in Kurdish).
