= Snowboarding at the 2017 European Youth Olympic Winter Festival =

- Venue: Palandoken Ski Centre
- Date: 13–16 February

Snowboarding at the 2017 European Youth Olympic Winter Festival was held at the Palandoken Ski Centre in Erzurum, Turkey from 13 to 16 February 2017.

== Results ==
=== Men's events ===
Event	Gold	Silver	Bronze
Snowboard Cross	Lucas Cornillat (FRA)	Glib Mostovenko (UKR)	Daniil Donskikh (RUS)
Parallel Giant Slalom	Dmitry Loginov (RUS)	Stepan Naumov (RUS)	Žiga Ozebek (SLO)

=== Women's events ===
Event	Gold	Silver	Bronze
Snowboard Cross	Agathe Sillieres (FRA)	Kim Martinez (FRA)	Ellie Soutter (GBR)
Parallel Giant Slalom	Elena Boltaeva (RUS)	Anastasia Kurochkina (RUS)	Aydan Karakulak (TUR)

=== Mixed ===
Event	Gold	Silver	Bronze
Mixed Team Snowboard Cross	France 1 Agathe Sillieres; Lucas Cornillat	France 2 Kim Martinez; Guillaume Herpin	Russia; Zinaida Vasileva; Daniil Donskikh
