= Tymnos =

Town of ancient Caria

Coordinates: 36°41′26″N 28°03′44″E

Tymnos (Ancient Greek: Τύμνος) was a town of the Rhodian Peraea in ancient Caria, located on the bay Thymnias, which formed its harbour. It was a member of the Delian League.

Its site is located near Bozburun, Asiatic Turkey.
