= Sazlı, Aşkale =

Village in Turkey

Sazlı
- Neighbourhood
- Location in Turkey
- Coordinates: 39°57′54″N 40°28′00″E
- Country: Turkey
- Province: Erzurum
- District: Aşkale
- Population (2022): 51
- Time zone: UTC+3 (TRT)

Sazlı is a neighbourhood in the municipality and district of Aşkale, Erzurum Province in Turkey. Its population is 51 (2022).
