= Hacımahmut, Aşkale =

Village in Turkey

Hacımahmut
- Neighbourhood
- Location in Turkey
- Coordinates: 39.804444°N 40.723333°E
- Country: Turkey
- Province: Erzurum
- District: Aşkale
- Population (2022): 87
- Time zone: UTC+3 (TRT)

Hacımahmut is a neighbourhood in the municipality and district of Aşkale, Erzurum Province in Turkey. Its population is 87 (2022).
