= Kandilli, Aşkale =

Village in Turkey

Kandilli
- Neighbourhood
- Location in Turkey
- Coordinates: 39°54′35″N 40°50′35″E
- Country: Turkey
- Province: Erzurum
- District: Aşkale
- Population (2022): 926
- Time zone: UTC+3 (TRT)

Kandilli is a neighbourhood in the municipality and district of Aşkale, Erzurum Province in Turkey. Its population is 926 (2022).
