= Athletics at the 1997 European Youth Summer Olympic Days =

The athletics competition at the 1997 European Youth Summer Olympic Days was held from 20 to 23 July. The events took place in Lisbon, Portugal. Boys and girls born 1980 or 1981 or later participated 29 track and field events, divided equally between the sexes with the exception of 3000 metres, 2000 metres steeplechase and pole vault for boys but not girls.

== Medal summary ==
=== Men ===
Event	Gold		Silver		Bronze	
100 metres	Luke Davis (GBR)	10.45	Athanásios Tsiouris (GRE)	10.76	Rudy Colabella (BEL)	10.83
200 metres (wind: +3.0 m/s)	Marco Cuneo (ITA)	21.34 w	Guido Helfenstein (SUI)	21.57 w	Matic Osovnikar (SLO)	21.68 w
400 metres	Kris Stewart (GBR)	47.31	Ralf Hegny (AUT)	48.10	Adrian Guianu (ROU)	48.39
800 metres	Bram Som (NED)	1:54.81	Vasyl Tsikalo (UKR)	1:55.34	Geert Waelput (BEL)	1:55.36
1500 metres	Colm McLean (IRL)	3:54.54	Ishak Kaya (TUR)	3:56.44	Javier Areny (ESP)	3:57.88
3000 metres	Francisco Javier Alves (ESP)	8:20.69	Filipe Pedro (POR)	8:22.96	Yeóryios Kobogiánnis (GRE)	8:23.18
110 metres hurdles	Cédric Assouvie (FRA)	13.82	Dominique Kunzler (SUI)	13.85	Felipe Vivancos (ESP)	13.90
400 metres hurdles	Richard McDonald (GBR)	52.80	Bernat Bartolomé (ESP)	53.50	Mikael Jakobsson (SWE)	53.77
2000 metres steeplechase	Ivan Murcia (ESP)	5:57.99	Alin Savu (ROU)	5:59.97	Georg Mlynek (AUT)	6:01.00
4 × 100 m relay	Great Britain (GBR)	41.08	Slovenia (SLO)	42.28	Greece (GRE)	42.35
High jump	Einar Karl Hjartarson (ISL)	2.11 m	Yaroslav Rybakov (RUS)	2.09 m	Yaroslav Vasilevskiy (BLR)	2.09 m
Pole vault	Fabrice Fortin (FRA)	5.00 m	Adam Ptácek (CZE)	4.90 m	Spas Bukhalov (BUL)	4.75 m
Long jump	Brian Robinson (GBR)	7.60 m	David Frykholm (SWE)	7.53 m	Jože Vrtacic (SLO)	7.45 m
Shot put	Pavlos Atmatsidis (GRE)	19.41 m	Teijo Kööpikkä (FIN)	19.33 m	Dmitriy Lopatin (RUS)	19.31 m
Discus throw	Mikko Kyyrö (FIN)	60.82 m	Rune Johansen (NOR)	56.76 m	Antonín Žalský (CZE)	56.76 m
Javelin throw	Tim Kitney (GBR)	64.56 m	Aleksey Danilyuk (BLR)	61.28 m	Alexander Baranovskiy (RUS)	60.94 m

=== Women ===
Event	Gold		Silver		Bronze	
100 metres	Jenny Kallur (SWE)	11.75	Sandra Dufour (FRA)	11.92	Kelly Thomas (GBR)	12.00
200 metres (wind: +2.7 m/s)	Ciara Sheehy (IRL)	24.11 w	Karlene Palmer (GBR)	24.41 w	Cécilia Seraline (FRA)	24.70 w
400 metres	Tetiana Petlyuk (UKR)	55.47	Alexia Oberstolz (ITA)	55.85	Femke Rietveld (NED)	56.00
800 metres	Ludivine Michel (BEL)	2:09.64	Olesya Chumakova (RUS)	2:11.08	Yuliya Gurtovenko (UKR)	2:12.45
1500 metres	Sonja Stolić (YUG)	4:26.95	Rasa Drazdauskaitė (LTU)	4:28.69	Tinneke Boonen (BEL)	4:30.13
100 metres hurdles (wind: +2.6 m/s)	Marilia Gregoriou (CYP)	13.51 w	Fanny Gérance (FRA)	13.61 w	Yevgeniya Stavchanskaya (UKR)	13.78 w
400 metres hurdles	Natalya Antyukh (RUS)	59.75	Elodie Cruchant (FRA)	61.06	Ruža Matković (CRO)	61.41
4 × 100 m relay	France (FRA)	46.25	Sweden (SWE)	46.52	Great Britain (GBR)	46.93
High jump	Hanna Mikkonen (FIN)	1.80 m	Viktoriya Slivka (RUS)	1.80 m	Nelly Sebastien (FRA)	1.75 m
Long jump	Yevgeniya Stavchanskaya (UKR)	6.25 m	Aldona Wozignój (POL)	6.24 m	Danielle Freeman (GBR)	6.19 m
Shot put	Oksana Zakharchuk (UKR)	15.27 m	Oksana Gromova (RUS)	14.63 m	Niina Kelo (FIN)	14.40 m
Discus throw	Niina Kelo (FIN)	49.54 m	Alina Lenghel (ROU)	47.88 m	Amélie Perrin (FRA)	47.66 m
Javelin throw	Jarmila Klimešová (CZE)	51.64 m	Oksana Ospishcheva (RUS)	50.50 m	Linda Wicksell (SWE)	47.62 m
