= Ocaklı, Aşkale =

Village in Turkey

Ocaklı
- Neighbourhood
- Location in Turkey
- Coordinates: 39.904722°N 40.620278°E
- Country: Turkey
- Province: Erzurum
- District: Aşkale
- Population (2022): 31
- Time zone: UTC+3 (TRT)

Ocaklı is a neighbourhood in the municipality and district of Aşkale, Erzurum Province in Turkey. Its population is 31 (2022).
