= Palandöken Ski Center =

Ski Resort in Erzurum, Turkey

- Location within Turkey
- Location: Palandöken Mountain, Turkey
- Nearest city: Erzurum
- Coordinates: 39°52′11″N 41°16′24″E
- Top elevation: 3,176 m (10,420 ft) AMSL
- Base elevation: 2,200 m (7,218 ft)
- Skiable area: 460 ha (1,100 acres)
- Trails: 22
- Lift system: 1 gondola lift and 5 chairlift
- Website: www.palandokenkayakmerkezi.com

Palandöken Ski Center (Turkish: Palandöken Kayak Merkezi) is a ski resort for alpine skiing and snowboarding on the Palandöken Mountain in Erzurum Province, eastern Turkey.

The ski center is situated 7 km (4.3 mi) southwest of Erzurum. It was established for the 2011 Winter Universiade. Its base is at 2,200 m (7,200 ft), and the top elevation is 3,176 m (10,420 ft). It has a gondola lift and five chairlift lines serving the 22 pistes with different slopes, on a skiable area of 460 ha (1,100 acres). Skiing season at the resort begins in late October and ends in the first weeks of May in the higher regions. The runs "Ejder" and "Kapıkaya" are the longest ones. They are Olympic-sized and are suitable for slalom skiing and giant slalom disciplines. The total length of the runs are 28 km (17 mi) with the longest one being 12 km (7.5 mi) long and having an elevation difference of 1,100 m (3,600 ft).

The runs of Palandöken Ski Resort are served by aerial lifts such as eight chairlifts of various size and one gondola lift, all having a total hourly transport capacity of 8,100 skiers.

Hotels at the ski resort provide accommodation in addition to the lodging establishments in the city.

The runs are illuminated so that skiing can be performed in the darkness that begins to fall at about 16:00 hours local time. The illumination of the runs were intensified in January 2017.

In December 2012, the operation rights were transferred from the Turkey Ski Federation to the Youth Services and Sports Directorate of Erzurum Province. The ski resort remained inactive after the 2011 Winter Universiade finished. The ski resort's operation was transferred to the Erzurum Metropolitan Municipality in September 2016.

== International events hosted ==
- 2011 Winter Universiade, 27 January – 6 February – snowboarding and freestyle skiing competitions.
- 2017 European Youth Olympic Winter Festival, 12 – 17 February – Alpine Skiing and snowboarding.
