= Palandöken Dam =

- Location within Turkey
- Official name: Palandöken Baraji
- Country: Turkey
- Location: Çat
- Coordinates: 39°39′26″N 41°01′19″E
- Status: Operational
- Construction began: 1994
- Opening date: 2001
- Owner: Turkish State Hydraulic Works

Dam and spillways
- Type of dam: Embankment, rock-fill with clay-core
- Impounds: Lezgi River
- Height: 49 m (161 ft)
- Dam volume: 500,000 m^{3} (653,975 cu yd)

Reservoir
- Total capacity: 228,000,000 m^{3} (184,843 acre⋅ft)
- Surface area: 50 km^{2} (19 mi^{2})

Palandöken Dam is a rock-fill embankment dam on the Lezgi River near Çat in Erzurum Province, Turkey. Constructed between 1985 and 1988, the development was backed by the Turkish State Hydraulic Works. The purpose of the dam is irrigation and it provides water for up to 11,678 ha (28,857 acres) of land.

== See also ==
- List of dams and reservoirs in Turkey
