= Thyssanus =

Ancient Greek town in Karia

Coordinates: 36°39′17″N 28°06′25″E

Thyssanus or Thyssanous (Ancient Greek: Θυσσανούς) was a town of ancient Caria.

Its site is located near Saranda, Asiatic Turkey.
