= Eyüpoğlu, Aşkale =

Village in Turkey

Eyüpoğlu
- Neighbourhood
- Location in Turkey
- Coordinates: 39.81798°N 40.61466°E
- Country: Turkey
- Province: Erzurum
- District: Aşkale
- Population (2022): 17
- Time zone: UTC+3 (TRT)

Eyüpoğlu is a neighbourhood in the municipality and district of Aşkale, Erzurum Province in Turkey. Its population is 17 (2022).
