= Demirtepe, Gelibolu =

Village in Turkey

Demirtepe
- Village
- Country: Turkey
- Province: Çanakkale
- District: Gelibolu
- Population (2021): 219
- Time zone: UTC+3 (TRT)

Demirtepe is a village in the Gelibolu District of Çanakkale Province in Turkey. Its population is 219 (2021).
