= Ocaklı, Gelibolu =

Village in Turkey

Ocaklı
- Village
- Location in Turkey Ocaklı (Marmara)
- Coordinates: 40.48°N 26.6414°E
- Country: Turkey
- Province: Çanakkale
- District: Gelibolu
- Population (2021): 122
- Time zone: UTC+3 (TRT)

Ocaklı is a village in the Gelibolu District of Çanakkale Province in Turkey. Its population is 122 (2021).
