= Kasara (Caria) =

Town of ancient Caria

Coordinates: 36°36′34″N 28°04′06″E

Kasara was a town of ancient Caria. Its name does not appear in ancient authors but is inferred from inscriptions.

Its site is located near Asardibi, Asiatic Turkey.
