= Karahasan, Aşkale =

Village in Turkey

Karahasan
- Neighbourhood
- Location in Turkey
- Coordinates: 39.974722°N 40.712222°E
- Country: Turkey
- Province: Erzurum
- District: Aşkale
- Population (2022): 125
- Time zone: UTC+3 (TRT)

Karahasan is a neighbourhood in the municipality and district of Aşkale, Erzurum Province in Turkey. Its population is 125 (2022).
