= 1999 European Youth Summer Olympic Days =

Multi-sports competition

1999 European Youth Olympic Days
- Host city: Esbjerg
- Country: Denmark
- Nations: 48
- Athletes: 2,324
- Sport: 11
- Events: 84
- Opening: 10 July 1999
- Closing: 16 July 1999
- Opened by: Margrethe II of Denmark

Summer

Winter

The 1999 European Youth Summer Olympic Days was the fifth edition of multi-sport event for European youths between the ages of 12 and 18. It was held in Esbjerg, Denmark from 10 to 16 July. A total of eleven sports were contested.

== Sports ==
1999 European Youth Summer Olympic Days Sports Programme
- Athletics
- Badminton
- Basketball
- Cycling
- Football
- Gymnastics
- Handball
- Judo
- Swimming
- Tennis
- Volleyball

== Participating nations ==
Participating National Olympic Committees
- Albania
- Andorra
- Armenia
- Austria
- Azerbaijan
- Belarus
- Belgium
- Bosnia and Herzegovina
- Bulgaria
- Croatia
- Cyprus
- Czech Republic
- Denmark
- Estonia (22)
- Finland
- FR Yugoslavia
- FYR Macedonia
- France
- Georgia
- Germany
- Great Britain
- Greece
- Hungary
- Iceland
- Ireland
- Israel
- Italy
- Latvia
- Liechtenstein
- Lithuania
- Luxembourg
- Malta
- Moldova
- Monaco
- Netherlands
- Norway
- Poland
- Portugal
- Romania
- Russia
- San Marino
- Slovakia
- Slovenia
- Spain
- Sweden
- Switzerland
- Turkey
- Ukraine

== Medal table ==
* Host nation (Denmark)

Rank	Nation	Gold	Silver	Bronze	Total
1	Russia (RUS)	19	12	4	35
2	France (FRA)	9	5	7	21
3	Great Britain (GBR)	7	9	5	21
4	Hungary (HUN)	6	3	2	11
5	Germany (GER)	4	4	10	18
6	Poland (POL)	3	4	8	15
7	Ukraine (UKR)	3	4	5	12
8	Denmark (DEN)*	3	3	1	7
9	Croatia (CRO)	3	2	2	7
10	Sweden (SWE)	3	1	6	10
11	Israel (ISR)	3	0	3	6
12	Italy (ITA)	2	6	6	14
13	Slovenia (SLO)	2	4	4	10
14	Netherlands (NED)	2	1	8	11
15	Spain (ESP)	2	1	3	6
16	Luxembourg (LUX)	2	0	0	2
17	Georgia (GEO)	1	3	3	7
18	Czech Republic (CZE)	1	2	1	4
19	Yugoslavia (FRY)	1	2	0	3
20	Belgium (BEL)	1	1	2	4
21	Norway (NOR)	1	1	1	3
21	Switzerland (SUI)	1	1	1	3
21	Turkey (TUR)	1	1	1	3
24	Austria (AUT)	1	1	0	2
24	Portugal (POR)	1	1	0	2
26	Lithuania (LTU)	1	0	5	6
27	Armenia (ARM)	1	0	0	1
28	Romania (ROU)	0	4	2	6
29	Finland (FIN)	0	4	1	5
30	Belarus (BLR)	0	2	2	4
31	Estonia (EST)	0	2	1	3
32	Greece (GRE)	0	2	0	2
33	Moldova (MDA)	0	1	1	2
34	Azerbaijan (AZE)	0	0	4	4
35	Cyprus (CYP)	0	0	1	1
35	Latvia (LAT)	0	0	1	1
35	Slovakia (SVK)	0	0	1	1
Totals (37 entries)		84	87	102	273
