= 2017 European Youth Olympic Winter Festival =

2017 edition of the European Youth Olympic Winter Festival

- Host city: Erzurum
- Country: Turkey
- Nations: 34
- Athletes: 1,241
- Sport: 9
- Events: 38
- Opening: 12 February 2017
- Closing: 17 February 2017
- Opened by: Recep Tayyip Erdoğan
- Main venue: Kazım Karabekir Stadium

Summer

Winter

The 2017 European Youth Olympic Winter Festival was held in Erzurum, Turkey from 12 to 17 February 2017.

The event had initially been planned for Sarajevo and East Sarajevo, Bosnia and Herzegovina, whereas the 2019 EYOF had been planned for Erzurum. In November 2015, the two cities agreed to swap their events, since Sarajevo could not be ready in time, while Erzurum already had facilities in place from the 2011 Winter Universiade.

== Venues ==
Venue	Sports
Kazım Karabekir Stadium	Ceremonies
Palandöken Ski Centre	Alpine Skiing, Snowboarding
Kandilli Ski Resort	Biathlon, Cross Country Skiing
Milli Piyango Curling Arena	Curling
Erzurum Ice Skating Arena	Figure Skating, Short Track Speed Skating
Erzurum GSIM Ice Arena	Ice Hockey
Kiremitlik Hill Ski Jumping Facility	Ski Jumping

== Sports ==
2017 European Youth Olympic Winter Festival Sports Programme
- Alpine skiing (5)
- Biathlon (5)
- Cross-country skiing (7)
- Curling (2)
- Figure skating (2)
- Ice hockey (1)
- Short track speed skating (7)
- Ski jumping (4)
- Snowboarding (5)

== Schedule ==
The competition schedule for the 2017 European Youth Olympic Winter Festival is as follows:

OC	Opening ceremony	1	Event finals	CC	Closing ceremony	●	Event competitions

February	12 Sun	13 Mon	14 Tue	15 Wed	16 Thu	17 Fri	Events
Ceremonies	OC					CC	
Alpine skiing		1	1	1	1	1	5
Biathlon		●	2	2	●	1	5
Cross-country skiing		2	2		2	1	7
Curling		●	●	●	●	2	2
Figure skating		●		2			2
Ice hockey		●	●	●	●	1	1
Short track speed skating				2	2	3	7
Ski jumping		●	2	●	●	2	4
Snowboarding		2		2	1		5
Total events		5	7	9	6	11	38
Cumulative total		5	12	21	27	38	
February	12 Sun	13 Mon	14 Tue	15 Wed	16 Thu	17 Fri	Events

== Participating nations ==
34 national federations sent athletes. Kosovo made its European Youth Olympic Winter Festival at these games.

Participating National Olympic Committees
- Albania (2 athletes)
- Armenia (3)
- Belarus (43)
- (Bosnia and Herzegovina) Bosnia Herzegovina (6)
- Bulgaria (19)
- Croatia (5)
- Cyprus (2)
- Czech Republic (39)
- Denmark (9)
- Estonia (19)
- Finland (30)
- France (59)
- (Georgia (country)) Georgia (6)
- (United Kingdom) Great Britain (16)
- Greece (10)
- Iceland (14)
- Italy (10)
- Kosovo (5)
- Lithuania (9)
- Luxembourg (4)
- Moldova (2)
- Montenegro (2)
- Netherlands (15)
- Norway (8)
- Poland (18)
- Romania (29)
- Russia (74)
- Serbia (3)
- Slovakia (40)
- Slovenia (41)
- Spain (4)
- Sweden (1)
- Turkey (99) (Hosts)
- Ukraine (25)

== Medal table ==
* Host nation (Turkey)

Rank	Nation	Gold	Silver	Bronze	Total
1	Russia (RUS)	19	9	11	39
2	France (FRA)	7	8	6	21
3	Slovenia (SLO)	5	2	3	10
4	Italy (ITA)	2	1	6	9
5	Finland (FIN)	1	5	4	10
6	Poland (POL)	1	1	2	4
7	Czech Republic (CZE)	1	1	1	3
8	Luxembourg (LUX)	1	1	0	2
9	Lithuania (LTU)	1	0	0	1
10	Ukraine (UKR)	0	3	0	3
11	Netherlands (NED)	0	2	1	3
11	Turkey (TUR)*	0	2	1	3
13	Belarus (BLR)	0	1	0	1
13	Croatia (CRO)	0	1	0	1
13	Estonia (EST)	0	1	0	1
16	Georgia (GEO)	0	0	1	1
16	Great Britain (GBR)	0	0	1	1
16	Slovakia (SVK)	0	0	1	1
Totals (18 entries)		38	38	38	114

== Mascot ==
The mascot of 2017 European Youth Olympic Winter Festival is a snowman named Karbeyaz. The name Karbeyaz, which is combined from the Turkish words Kar (snow) and Beyaz (white), won the public vote against the other 3 proposed names.
