= 1991 European Youth Olympic Days =

- Host city: Brussels
- Country: Belgium
- Nations: 33
- Athletes: 2084
- Sport: 9
- Events: 70
- Opening: 12 July 1991
- Closing: 21 July 1991
- Opened by: Baudouin of Belgium

Summer

Winter

The 1991 European Youth Olympic Days (1991 EYOD) was the inaugural edition of a multi-sport event for European youths aged 13 to 18. It was held in Brussels, Belgium, from 12 to 21 July. A total of nine sports were contested by 2,084 athletes representing 33 European nations. The idea for the competition came from Jacques Rogge, an International Olympic Committee member, as the continent did not have its own multi-sport event at the time.

== Sports ==
Nine sports were included in these initial Games, five individual sports of athletics, swimming, judo, tennis and table tennis for both genders, and four team sports; football and basketball for boys, volleyball and field hockey for girls.

1991 European Youth Summer Olympic Days Sports Programme
- Athletics (24)
- Basketball (1)
- Field hockey (1)
- Football (1)
- Judo (15)
- Swimming (22)
- Table tennis (3)
- Tennis (2)
- Volleyball (1)

== Medal table ==
* Host nation (Belgium)

Rank	Nation	Gold	Silver	Bronze	Total
1	France (FRA)	13	8	10	31
2	Soviet Union (URS)	12	5	7	24
3	Great Britain (GBR)	10	9	10	29
4	Italy (ITA)	8	6	8	22
5	Netherlands (NED)	5	2	4	11
6	Romania (ROU)	4	6	5	15
7	Poland (POL)	4	5	2	11
8	Spain (ESP)	3	8	10	21
9	Sweden (SWE)	3	4	2	9
10	Czechoslovakia (TCH)	2	2	0	4
11	Turkey (TUR)	2	0	0	2
12	Belgium (BEL)*	1	3	10	14
13	Germany (GER)	1	2	1	4
14	Portugal (POR)	1	1	3	5
15	Finland (FIN)	1	0	1	2
16	Bulgaria (BUL)	0	3	3	6
17	Ireland (IRL)	0	3	2	5
18	Austria (AUT)	0	1	2	3
18	Greece (GRE)	0	1	2	3
20	Cyprus (CYP)	0	1	0	1
21	Albania (ALB)	0	0	1	1
21	Switzerland (SUI)	0	0	1	1
21	Yugoslavia (YUG)	0	0	1	1
Totals (23 entries)		70	70	85	225
