= Badminton at the Summer Youth Olympics =

- Governing body: BWF
- Events: 2 (men: 1; women: 1)

Games
- 2010; 2014; 2018; 2026

Badminton was inducted at the Youth Olympic Games at the inaugural edition in 2010. The program included two competitions: Boys' singles and Girls' singles. The 2014 edition added a Mixed Doubles event. Players from different National Olympic Committees are allowed to participate in doubles events.

== Medal table ==
As of the 2026 Summer Youth Olympics.

Rank	Nation	Gold	Silver	Bronze	Total
1	China	4	3	1	8
–	Mixed-NOCs	2	2	2	6
2	Thailand	2	0	2	4
3	Malaysia	1	0	0	1
3	United Arab Emirates	1	0	0	1
5	India	0	3	0	3
6	Japan	0	1	2	3
7	France	0	1	0	1
8	Indonesia	0	0	1	1
8	South Korea	0	0	1	1
8	Vietnam	0	0	1	1
Totals (10 entries)		10	10	10	30

== Results ==
=== Boys' singles ===
Games	Gold	Silver	Bronze
2010 Singapore	Pisit Poodchalat; Thailand	Prannoy Kumar; India	Kang Ji-wook; South Korea
2014 Nanjing	Shi Yuqi; China	Lin Guipu; China	Anthony Sinisuka Ginting; Indonesia
2018 Buenos Aires	Li Shifeng; China	Lakshya Sen; India	Kodai Naraoka; Japan
2026 Dakar	Riyan Malhan; United Arab Emirates	Mady Sow; France	Hong Tianyue; China

=== Girls' singles ===
Games	Gold	Silver	Bronze
2010 Singapore	Sapsiree Taerattanachai; Thailand	Deng Xuan; China	Vũ Thị Trang; Vietnam
2014 Nanjing	He Bingjiao; China	Akane Yamaguchi; Japan	Busanan Ongbamrungphan; Thailand
2018 Buenos Aires	Goh Jin Wei; Malaysia	Wang Zhiyi; China	Phittayaporn Chaiwan; Thailand
2026 Dakar	Zhang Yixin; China	Tanvi Patri; India	Yuzuno Watanabe; Japan

=== Mixed ===
Games	Gold	Silver	Bronze
2014 Nanjing	Cheam June Wei (MAS); Ng Tsz Yau (HKG)	Kanta Tsuneyama (JPN); Lee Chia-hsin (TPE)	Sachin Dias (SRI); He Bingjiao (CHN)
2018 Buenos Aires	Alpha; Lakshya Sen (IND); Giovanni Toti (ITA); Vannthoun Vath (CAM); Brian Yang (CAN); Hasini Ambalangodage (SRI); Maria Delcheva (BUL); Jennie Gai (USA); Ashwathi Pillai (SWE)	Omega; Markus Barth (NOR); Oscar Guo (NZL); Chang Ho Kim (FIJ); Kunlavut Vitidsarn (THA); Huang Yin-hsuan (TPE); Léonice Huet (FRA); Anastasiya Prozorova (UKR); Vũ Thị Anh Thư (VIE)	Theta; Julien Carraggi (BEL); Mohamed Mostafa Kamel (EGY); Kodai Naraoka (JPN); Lukas Resch (GER); Zecily Fung (AUS); Jaqueline Lima (BRA); Hirari Mizui (JPN); Tereza Švábíková (CZE)

== Participating nations ==
Nation	10	14	18	Years
Algeria	1		1	3
Argentina			1	1
Australia	2	2	1	3
Austria	1	2		2
Belgium			1	1
Botswana		1		1
Brazil		1	2	2
Bulgaria		2	1	2
Canada	2		1	2
Cambodia			1	1
Republic of the Congo		1		1
Chile			1	1
China	2	4	2	3
Chinese Taipei	2	2	2	3
Cameroon			1	1
Croatia		1		1
Czech Republic			1	1
Denmark	2	1		2
Dominican Republic			1	1
Egypt	1	2	1	4
El Salvador			1	1
Spain	1	2	2	3
Estonia		1		1
Fiji			1	1
Finland	2			1
France	2	2	2	3
Great Britain	1		2	2
Germany	1	2	2	3
Ghana		1		2
Hong Kong		1		1
Hungary			2	1
Indonesia	2	2	2	3
India	2	2	2	3
Ireland			1	1
Italy			1	1
Jamaica	1			1
Jordan	1			1
Japan	3	2	2	3
Kazakhstan			1	1
South Korea	2	2		2
Laos	1		1	2
Malaysia	2	2	1	3
Moldova			2	1
Maldives	1			1
Mexico	2	2		2
North Macedonia	1			1
Mauritius	1			2
Netherlands	2	2	2	3
Nepal		1	1	2
Nigeria	1		1	2
New Zealand	2		1	2
Norway			1	1
Peru	2	1	1	3
Poland		2		1
Seychelles	1	1		2
Singapore	1	2	2	3
Slovenia		2	1	2
Serbia		1		1
South Africa				1
Sri Lanka	2	2	1	3
Suriname	1	1		2
Sweden	1		1	2
Thailand	2	2	2	3
Turkey	2	2	1	3
Tuvalu	1			1
Uganda	1	1		2
Ukraine	1	2	2	3
United States	2		1	2
Vietnam	2	1	2	3
Zambia	1			1
No. of boys badminton players	32	32	32	
No. of girls badminton players	32	32	31	
No. of badminton players	64	64	63	
No. of nations	42	38	46	
No. of new nations	42	12	15	

== See also ==
- Badminton at the Summer Olympics
