= Speed skating at the Winter Youth Olympics =

- Governing body: ISU
- Events: 7 (men: 3; womens: 3; mixed: 1)

Games
- 2012; 2016; 2020; 2024

Speed Skating was inducted at the Youth Olympic Games at the inaugural edition in 2012, with 8 events. For the 2016 and 2020 editions the number of events was reduced to 7. A mixed event consisting of a team sprint race was included on the program.

== Medal table ==
As of the 2024 Winter Youth Olympics.

Rank	Nation	Gold	Silver	Bronze	Total
1	China	7	9	4	20
2	South Korea	7	4	5	16
3	Netherlands	7	2	2	11
4	Japan	3	6	7	16
5	Germany	3	0	0	3
–	Mixed-NOCs	2	2	2	6
6	Norway	0	1	3	4
7	Russia	0	1	2	3
8	Belarus	0	1	0	1
8	Colombia	0	1	0	1
8	Czech Republic	0	1	0	1
8	Spain	0	1	0	1
12	Italy	0	0	2	2
13	Poland	0	0	1	1
13	United States	0	0	1	1
Totals (14 entries)		29	29	29	87

== See also ==
- Speed skating at the Winter Olympics
