= Sailing at the Summer Youth Olympics =

- Governing body: WS
- Events: 5 (men: 2; womens: 2; mixed: 1)

Games
- 2010; 2014; 2018

Sailing has featured as a sport at the Youth Olympic Summer Games since its first edition in 2010. The Youth Olympic Games are multi-sport event and the games are held every four years just like the Olympic Games. With sailing limited to four events sailing has chosen to feature athlete under 16 in two disciplines. This allows older youth competitors in sailing to focus on the Olympic disciplines through events like the ISAF Youth Sailing World Championships as the games could permit sailors up to 18 years old.

== Participating nations ==
Event	10	14	18	Years
Netherlands Antilles	1			1
Algeria	2	2	2	6
Antigua and Barbuda		1	1	2
Argentina	3	2	4	9
Aruba	1	1		2
American Samoa	1			1
Australia	2	2	3	7
Austria	1			1
Bahamas		1		1
Belgium	1			1
Bermuda	1	1		2
Belarus	1		1	2
Brazil	3	3	3	9
Bulgaria		1		1
Canada	2	1		3
Cayman Islands	1	2		3
Chile	1	2		3
China	2	1	2	5
Cook Islands	2	1		3
Croatia		2	2	4
Cuba	2			2
Denmark	1			1
Dominican Republic	2	1	2	5
Ecuador		1		1
Egypt		1	2	3
Spain	2	1	1	4
Estonia	1	1		2
Finland	2	1		3
France	2	4	4	10
Great Britain	2	1	2	5
Germany	2		1	3
Greece	1	1	2	4
Guatemala	2			2
Hong Kong	2	2	2	6
Hungary	2	2		4
Indonesia		2		2
India		1		1
Ireland	1			1
Israel	2	2	2	6
Virgin Islands	2	2		4
Italy	3	4	3	10
British Virgin Islands		1		1
Japan	2	2	1	5
Kenya	1			1
South Korea	1			1
Latvia	1	1		2
Saint Lucia	1	1		2
Lithuania	1			1
Morocco			1	1
Malaysia	2	2		4
Mexico	2	2	2	6
Monaco	1			1
Myanmar		1	1	2
Netherlands	2	4	1	7
Norway	1	1	1	3
New Zealand	2	3	3	8
Oman			1	1
Peru	2	3	2	7
Philippines			1	1
Papua New Guinea		1		1
Poland	3	1	3	7
Portugal	2	2	1	5
Puerto Rico	1	1		2
South Africa		2	1	3
Russia	1	2	2	5
Singapore	3	3	2	8
Slovenia	2	1	1	4
San Marino	1			1
Switzerland	2		1	3
Slovakia		1		1
Sweden		1		1
Thailand	2	4	1	7
Chinese Taipei		1	1	2
Trinidad and Tobago		1		1
Tunisia	1	1		2
Turkey	2	1	1	4
United Arab Emirates	1	1		2
Ukraine	2	1		3
Uruguay		1		1
United States	2	2	3	7
Venezuela		2	1	3
Windsurfing - Male	21	20	24	65
Windsurfing - Female	18	21	23	62
Dinghy - Male	29	30		59
Dinghy = Female	32	30		62
Kite - Male			12	12
Kite - Female			12	12
Multihull - Male			14	14
Multihull - Female			14	14
Sailors	100	101	99	300
Continents	6	6	6	
Countries	62	60	40	162
New Countries	18	60	3	81
Year	10	14	18	

== Medal table ==
As of the 2018 Summer Youth Olympics.

Rank	Nation	Gold	Silver	Bronze	Total
1	Italy	2	2	0	4
2	Singapore	2	0	1	3
3	Argentina	2	0	0	2
4	Austria	1	0	0	1
4	China	1	0	0	1
4	Dominican Republic	1	0	0	1
4	Greece	1	0	0	1
4	Israel	1	0	0	1
4	Thailand	1	0	0	1
4	Virgin Islands	1	0	0	1
11	France	0	3	1	4
12	Netherlands	0	2	2	4
13	Russia	0	2	1	3
14	Germany	0	1	1	2
15	Hong Kong	0	1	0	1
15	Philippines	0	1	0	1
15	Portugal	0	1	0	1
15	Slovenia	0	1	0	1
15	Spain	0	1	0	1
20	Great Britain	0	0	2	2
21	Hungary	0	0	1	1
21	Netherlands Antilles	0	0	1	1
21	Peru	0	0	1	1
Totals (23 entries)		13	15	11	39

== Equipment ==
Event	Class	Year			
		2010	2014	2018	2026
One Person Dinghy	Byte CII	●	●		
Windsurfing	Techno 293	●	●	●	●
Kitesurfing	IKA Twin Tip Racing			●	
Multihull	Nacra 15			●	

== Medalist by Games ==
=== 2010 Youth Olympic Games Events ===
Event	Gold	Silver	Bronze
Male Dinghy 2010: Byte CII	Ian Barrows (ISV)	Florian Haufe (GER)	Just Van Aanholt (AHO)
Female Dinghy 2010: Byte CII	Lara Vadlau (AUT)	Daphne van der Vaart (NED)	Constanze Stolz (GER)
Male Windsurfer 2010: Techno 293	Mayan Rafic (ISR)	Chun Laung Michael Cheng (HKG)	Kieran Martin (GBR)
Female Windsurfer 2010: Techno 293	Siripon Kaewduang-Ngam (THA)	Veronica Fanciulli (ITA)	Audrey Pei Lin Yong (SIN)

=== 2014 Youth Olympic Games Events ===
Event	Gold	Silver	Bronze
Male Dinghy 2014: Byte CII	Cheok Khoon Bernie Chin; Singapore	Rodolfo Pires; Portugal	Jonatán Vadnai; Hungary
Female Dinghy 2014: Byte CII	Samantha Yom; Singapore	Odile van Aanholt; Netherlands	Jarian Brandes; Peru
Male Windsurfer 2014: Techno 293	Francisco Saubidet Birkner; Argentina	Maxim Tokarev; Russia	Lars van Someren; Netherlands
Female Windsurfer 2014: Techno 293	Linli Wu; China	Mariam Sekhposyan; Russia	Lucie Pianazza; France

=== 2018 Youth Olympic Games Events ===
Event	Gold	Silver	Bronze
Techno 293+	Alexandros Kalpogiannakis; Greece	Nicolò Renna; Italy	Finn Hawkins; Great Britain
IKA Twin Tip Racing	Deury Corniel; Dominican Republic	Christian Tio; Philippines Toni Vodišek; Slovenia	Not awarded
Techno 293+	Giorgia Speciale; Italy	Manon Pianazza; France	Yana Reznikova; Russia
IKA Twin Tip Racing	Sofia Tomasoni; Italy	Nina Font; Spain Poema Newland; France	Not awarded
Nacra 15	Dente Cittadini; Teresa Romerone; Argentina	Kenza Coutard; Titouan Petard; France	Laila Van Der Meer; Bjarne Bouwer; Netherlands

== See also ==
- Sailing at the Summer Olympics
