= Thailand at the Youth Olympics =

- IOC code: THA
- NOC: National Olympic Committee of Thailand
- Website: www.olympicthai.or.th (in Thai and English)
- Medals Ranked 24th: Gold 11 Silver 11 Bronze 5 Total 27

Summer appearances
- 2010; 2014; 2018; 2026

Winter appearances
- 2020; 2024

Thailand first participated at the Youth Olympic Games in 2010, and has sent athletes to compete in every Summer Youth Olympic Games since then.

== Medal tables ==
=== Medals by Summer Games ===
Games	Athletes	Gold	Silver	Bronze	Total	Rank
Singapore 2010	34	4	3	0	7	14
(China) Nanjing 2014	37	3	2	3	8	18
(Argentina) Buenos Aires 2018	57	4	5	2	11	13
(Senegal) Dakar 2026	28	0	1	1	2	66
Total		11	11	6	28	16

=== Medals by Winter Games ===
Games	Athletes	Gold	Silver	Bronze	Total	Rank
(Austria) Innsbruck 2012	Did not participate					
(Norway) Lillehammer 2016	Did not participate					
(Switzerland) Lausanne 2020	5	0	0	0	0	-
(South Korea) Gangwon 2024	20	0	1	0	1	27
Total		0	1	0	1	35

=== Medals by Summer Sport ===
Games	Gold	Silver	Bronze	Total
Athletics	0	0	1	1
Badminton	2	0	2	4
Boxing	2	3	1	5
Golf	1	0	2	3
Sailing	1	0	0	1
Swimming	0	1	0	1
Taekwondo	3	1	0	4
Weightlifting	2	6	0	8
Total	11	11	6	28

=== Medals by Winter Sport ===
Games	Gold	Silver	Bronze	Total	Rank
Bobsleigh	0	1	0	1	9
Total	0	1	0	1	35

== List of medalists ==
=== Medalists by Summer Games ===
Medal	Name	Games	Sport	Event
Gold	Pisit Poodchalat	Singapore 2010	Badminton	Boys' singles
Gold	Sapsiree Taerattanachai	Singapore 2010	Badminton	Girls' singles
Gold	Siripon Kaewduang-ngam	Singapore 2010	Sailing	Girls' Techno 293
Gold	Worawong Pongpanit	Singapore 2010	Taekwondo	Girls' 49 kg
Silver	Chatuphum Chinnawong	Singapore 2010	Weightlifting	Boys' 77 kg
Silver	Sirivimon Pramongkhol	Singapore 2010	Weightlifting	Girls' 48 kg
Silver	Chitchanok Pulsabsakul	Singapore 2010	Weightlifting	Girls' +63 kg
Gold	Panipak Wongpattanakit	(China) Nanjing 2014	Taekwondo	Girls' 44 kg
Gold	Rattanaphon Pakkaratha	(China) Nanjing 2014	Weightlifting	Girls' 53 kg
Gold	Dunganksorn Chaidee	(China) Nanjing 2014	Weightlifting	Girls' +63 kg
Silver	Sarisa Suwannachet	(China) Nanjing 2014	Swimming	Girls' 400 m freestyle
Silver	Sakda Meeboon	(China) Nanjing 2014	Weightlifting	Boys' 62 kg
Bronze	Busanan Ongbumrungpan	(China) Nanjing 2014	Badminton	Girls' Single
Bronze	Danthai Boonma	(China) Nanjing 2014	Golf	Boys' individual
Bronze	Supamas Sangchan	(China) Nanjing 2014	Golf	Girls' individual
Gold	Kanthinda Saengsin	(Argentina) Buenos Aires 2018	Taekwondo	Girls' 55 kg
Gold	Atthaya Thitikul; Vanchai Luangnitikul	(Argentina) Buenos Aires 2018	Golf	Mixed team
Gold	Panpatchara Somnuek	(Argentina) Buenos Aires 2018	Boxing	Girls' 57 kg
Gold	Atichai Phoemsap	(Argentina) Buenos Aires 2018	Boxing	Boys' 60 kg
Silver	Natthawat Chomchuen	(Argentina) Buenos Aires 2018	Weightlifting	Boys' 56 kg
Silver	Nareupong Thepsen	(Argentina) Buenos Aires 2018	Taekwondo	Boys' 63 kg
Silver	Thipwara Chontavin	(Argentina) Buenos Aires 2018	Weightlifting	Girls' -63 kg
Silver	Sarawut Sukthet	(Argentina) Buenos Aires 2018	Boxing	Boys' 52 kg
Silver	Porntip Buapa	(Argentina) Buenos Aires 2018	Boxing	Girls' 60 kg
Bronze	Phittayaporn Chaiwan	(Argentina) Buenos Aires 2018	Badminton	Girls' singles
Bronze	Weerapon Jongjohor	(Argentina) Buenos Aires 2018	Boxing	Boys' 75 kg
Silver	Siwa Chainarong	(Senegal) Dakar 2026	Boxing	Men's 60 kg
Bronze	Tanakorn Daengmanee	(Senegal) Dakar 2026	Athletics	Men's pole vault

=== Medalists by Summer Games in Mixed-NOCs Team ===
Medal	Name	Games	Sport	Event
Gold	Witthawat Thumcha	(China) Nanjing 2014	Athletics	Mixed 8 × 100 m relay
Silver	Kunlavut Vitidsarn	(Argentina) Buenos Aires 2018	Badminton	Mixed team relay
Silver	Aitthiwat Soithong	(Argentina) Buenos Aires 2018	Archery	Mixed team

=== Medalists by Winter Games ===
Medal	Name	Games	Sport	Event
Silver	Agnese Campeol	(South Korea) Gangwon 2024	Bobsleigh	Women's monobob

== Flag bearers ==
=== Flag bearers by Summer Games ===
Games	Flag bearer	Sport
Singapore 2010	Jirapong Meenapra	Athletics
(China) Nanjing 2014	Vitsanu Phosri	Athletics
(Argentina) Buenos Aires 2018	Atichai Phoemsap	Boxing
(Senegal) Dakar 2026	Thitaphat Preechayan	Table tennis
(Senegal) Dakar 2026	Natthakittha Leekitchatkorn	Swimming

=== Flag bearers by Winter Games ===
Games	Flag bearer	Sport
(Austria) Innsbruck 2012	Did not participate	
(Norway) Lillehammer 2016	Did not participate	
(Switzerland) Lausanne 2020	Nichakan Chinupun	Alpine skiing
(South Korea) Gangwon 2024	Thanakorn Ngoeichai	Cross-country skiing
(South Korea) Gangwon 2024	Agnese Campeol	Bobsleigh

== Olympic participants ==
=== Summer Games ===
Sport	(Singapore) 2010	(China) 2014	(Argentina) 2018	(Senegal) 2026
Archery	1		1	
Athletics	5	7	1	2
Badminton	2	2	2	2
Basketball	4	4		
Beach handball			9	10
Beach volleyball		4	4	2
Boxing			5	2
Canoeing			1	
Coastal rowing				2
Cycling	4		2	1
Futsal			10	
Golf		2	2	
Gymnastics	2	1		
Judo				1
Karate			1	
Roller speed skating			1	
Rowing	2		2	
Sailing	2	4	1	2
Shooting	1	1	1	
Swimming	2	4	3	2
Table tennis	2	2	2	2
Taekwondo	1	2	3	
Tennis	1	1	1	
Triathlon	1			
Weightlifting	4	3	4	
Total	34	37	57	28

=== Winter Games ===
Sport	(Switzerland) 2020	(South Korea) 2024
Alpine skiing	2	2
Biathlon		4
Bobsleigh		2
Cross-country skiing	2	4
Freestyle skiing		1
Luge		2
Short track speed skating	1	2
Skeleton		2
Snowboarding		1
Total	5	20

== See also ==
- Olympics
  - Thailand at the Olympics
- Paralympic
  - Thailand at the Paralympics
- Asian Games
  - Thailand at the Asian Games
  - Thailand at the Asian Para Games
- Other
  - Thailand at the Universiade
  - Thailand at the World Games
