= Athletics at the Summer Youth Olympics =

- Governing body: IAAF
- Events: 36 (men: 18; women: 18; mixed: 0)

Games
- 2010; 2014; 2018; 2026

Athletics has featured as a sport at the Youth Olympic Summer Games since its first edition in 2010. The Youth Olympic Games are multi-sport event and the games are held every four years just like the Olympic Games. Athletes under the age of 18 can participate in the Games. This age group corresponds with the youth category of athletics competition.

== Summary ==
Games	Year	Events	Best Nation
1	2010	36	Kenya
2	2014	37	China
3	2018	36	China
4	2026	36	Ethiopia

== Medal table ==
As of the 2026 Summer Youth Olympics.

Rank	Nation	Gold	Silver	Bronze	Total
1	China	14	9	5	28
2	Ethiopia	12	11	6	29
3	Kenya	11	5	4	20
4	Ukraine	9	3	8	20
5	France	8	6	2	16
6	Russia	6	4	4	14
7	Jamaica	6	4	2	12
8	Nigeria	6	2	1	9
9	South Africa	5	3	4	12
10	Cuba	5	1	1	7
11	Japan	4	8	5	17
12	United States	4	3	6	13
13	Spain	4	1	2	7
14	Australia	3	9	3	15
15	Germany	3	5	6	14
–	Mixed-NOCs	3	3	3	9
16	Italy	2	3	1	6
17	Ecuador	2	2	1	5
18	Brazil	2	1	2	5
19	Colombia	2	1	1	4
19	Qatar	2	1	1	4
21	Argentina	2	1	0	3
22	Poland	2	0	5	7
23	Dominican Republic	2	0	1	3
23	Sweden	2	0	1	3
25	Mexico	1	4	3	8
26	Hungary	1	3	5	9
27	Belarus	1	3	1	5
28	Bulgaria	1	2	1	4
28	Switzerland	1	2	1	4
30	Cyprus	1	2	0	3
31	Uganda	1	1	5	7
32	Egypt	1	1	4	6
33	Eritrea	1	1	3	5
34	United Arab Emirates	1	1	1	3
34	Zambia	1	1	1	3
36	Burundi	1	1	0	2
36	New Zealand	1	1	0	2
38	Czech Republic	1	0	3	4
39	Finland	1	0	2	3
39	Greece	1	0	2	3
41	Belgium	1	0	1	2
42	Iceland	1	0	0	1
42	Israel	1	0	0	1
42	Kuwait	1	0	0	1
42	Paraguay	1	0	0	1
42	Suriname	1	0	0	1
42	Zimbabwe	1	0	0	1
48	Romania	0	5	0	5
49	India	0	3	2	5
50	Morocco	0	2	3	5
51	Algeria	0	2	0	2
51	Botswana	0	2	0	2
51	Tunisia	0	2	0	2
51	Uzbekistan	0	2	0	2
51	Venezuela	0	2	0	2
56	Bahamas	0	1	1	2
56	Bahrain	0	1	1	2
56	Denmark	0	1	1	2
56	Philippines	0	1	1	2
56	Puerto Rico	0	1	1	2
56	Saint Lucia	0	1	1	2
56	Sri Lanka	0	1	1	2
63	Antigua and Barbuda	0	1	0	1
63	Croatia	0	1	0	1
63	Guyana	0	1	0	1
63	Lithuania	0	1	0	1
63	Slovakia	0	1	0	1
63	The Gambia	0	1	0	1
69	Turkey	0	0	4	4
70	Austria	0	0	3	3
71	Burkina Faso	0	0	2	2
71	Great Britain	0	0	2	2
71	Latvia	0	0	2	2
74	Azerbaijan	0	0	1	1
74	Chile	0	0	1	1
74	Chinese Taipei	0	0	1	1
74	Djibouti	0	0	1	1
74	Grenada	0	0	1	1
74	Hong Kong	0	0	1	1
74	Iraq	0	0	1	1
74	Moldova	0	0	1	1
74	Portugal	0	0	1	1
74	Saudi Arabia	0	0	1	1
74	Slovenia	0	0	1	1
74	South Korea	0	0	1	1
74	Thailand	0	0	1	1
Totals (86 entries)		144	142	146	432

== Events ==
Track events
Event	2010	2014	2018	2026
100 metres	B/G	B/G	B/G	B/G
200 metres	B/G	B/G	B/G	B/G
400 metres	B/G	B/G	B/G	B/G
800 metres	–	B/G	B/G	B/G
1000 metres	B/G	–	–	–
1500 metres	–	B/G	B/G	B/G
3000 metres	B/G	B/G	B/G	B/G
100 m hurdles	G	G	G	G
110 m hurdles	B	B	B	B
400 m hurdles	B/G	B/G	B/G	B/G
2000 m steeplechase	B/G	B/G	B/G	B/G
Relay race	B/G	M	–	–
5000 m walk	–	–	B/G	B/G
Road events
5 km walk	G	G	–	–
10 km walk	B	B	–	–
Cross country run	–	–	(B/G)	–
Field events
Long jump	B/G	B/G	B/G	B/G
Triple jump	B/G	B/G	B/G	B/G
High jump	B/G	B/G	B/G	B/G
Pole vault	B/G	B/G	B/G	B/G
Shot put	B/G	B/G	B/G	B/G
Discus throw	B/G	B/G	B/G	B/G
Javelin throw	B/G	B/G	B/G	B/G
Hammer throw	B/G	B/G	B/G	B/G
Total events	36	37	36	36

== Youth Olympic Games Records ==
=== Boys ===
Event	Record	Athlete	Nationality	Date	Games	Place	Ref
100 m	10.28 (+1.7 m/s)	Gift Bright	Nigeria	8 November 2026	2026 Games	Dakar, Senegal	
200 m	20.68 (+0.1 m/s)	Abdelaziz Mohamed	Qatar	16 October 2018	2018 Games	Buenos Aires, Argentina	
400 m	46.31	Martin Manley	Jamaica	23 August 2014	2014 Games	Nanjing, China	
800 m	1:48.99	Yomif Abebe	Ethiopia	10 November 2026	2026 Games	Dakar, Senegal	
1500 m	3:41.99	Gilbert Soet	Kenya	24 August 2014	2014 Games	Nanjing, China	
3000 m	7:56.20	Yomif Kejelcha	Ethiopia	24 August 2014	2014 Games	Nanjing, China	
110 m hurdles (91.4 cm)	12.95 (−0.4 m/s)	Marquies Page	Jamaica	9 November 2026	2026 Games	Dakar, Senegal	
400 m hurdles (84.0 cm)	50.60	Jaeden Campbell	Jamaica	10 November 2026	2026 Games	Dakar, Senegal	
2000 m steeplechase	5:34.24	Wogene Sidamo	Ethiopia	21 August 2014	2014 Games	Nanjing, China	
High jump	2.22 m	Chen Long	China	14 October 2018	2018 Games	Buenos Aires, Argentina	
High jump	2.22 m	Oscar Miers	Australia	14 October 2018	2018 Games	Buenos Aires, Argentina	
Pole vault	5.32 m	Baptiste Thiery	France	16 October 2018	2018 Games	Buenos Aires, Argentina	
Long jump	7.82 m (+1.5 m/s)	Joshua Cowley	Australia	15 October 2018	2018 Games	Buenos Aires, Argentina	
Triple jump	17.14 m (+1.9 m/s)	Jordan Díaz	Cuba	13 October 2018	2018 Games	Buenos Aires, Argentina	
Shot put (5 kg)	23.23 m	Krzysztof Brzozowski	Poland	22 August 2010	2010 Games	Singapore	
Discus throw (1.5 kg)	68.23 m	Yahya Sawaby	Egypt	9 November 2026	2026 Games	Dakar, Senegal	
Hammer throw (5 kg)	85.97 m	Mykhaylo Kokhan	Ukraine	12 October 2018	2018 Games	Buenos Aires, Argentina	
Javelin throw (700 g)	81.78 m	Braian Toledo	Argentina	22 August 2010	2010 Games	Singapore	
5000 m race walk (track)	20:13.69	Oscar Patín	Ecuador	11 October 2018	2018 Games	Buenos Aires, Argentina	
10000 m race walk (track)	42:03.64	Minoru Onogawa	Japan	24 August 2014	2014 Games	Nanjing, China	

=== Girls ===
Event	Record	Athlete	Nationality	Date	Games	Place	Ref
100 m	11.30 (0.0 m/s)	Ewa Swoboda	Poland	21 August 2014	2014 Games	Nanjing, China	
200 m	23.35 (+0.3 m/s)	Patricia Sine	Dominican Republic	10 November 2026	2026 Games	Dakar, Senegal	
400 m	52.50	Jessica Thornton	Australia	23 August 2014	2014 Games	Nanjing, China	
800 m	2:04.43	Netsanet Selemon	Ethiopia	9 November 2026	2026 Games	Dakar, Senegal	
1500 m	4:15.38	Kokeb Tesfaye Alemu	Ethiopia	25 August 2014	2014 Games	Nanjing, China	
3000 m	9:01.58	Nozomi Musembi Takamatsu	Japan	24 August 2014	2014 Games	Nanjing, China	
100 m hurdles (76.2 cm)	13.17 (+0.1 m/s)	Zhang Keyi	China	8 November 2026	2026 Games	Dakar, Senegal	
400 m hurdles	57.75	Megan Nieman	South Africa	10 November 2026	2026 Games	Dakar, Senegal	
2000 m steeplechase	6:20.10	Rosefline Chepngetich	Kenya	21 August 2014	2014 Games	Nanjing, China	
High jump	1.95 m	Yaroslava Mahuchikh	Ukraine	15 October 2018	2018 Games	Buenos Aires, Argentina	
Pole vault	4.36 m	Angelica Moser	Switzerland	23 August 2014	2014 Games	Nanjing, China	
Long jump	6.40 m (0.0 m/s)	Alina Rotaru	Romania	17 August 2010	2010 Games	Singapore	
Long jump	6.40 m (+0.2 m/s)	Lena Malkus	Germany	21 August 2010	2010 Games	Singapore	
Triple jump	13.86 m (+1.4 m/s)	Aleksandra Nacheva	Bulgaria	16 October 2018	2018 Games	Buenos Aires, Argentina	
Shot put (3 kg)	18.95 m	Alena Bugakova	Russia	24 August 2014	2014 Games	Nanjing, China	
Discus throw	55.49 m	Shanice Craft	Germany	21 August 2010	2010 Games	Singapore	
Hammer throw (3 kg)	74.90 m	Valeriya Ivanenko	Ukraine	12 October 2018	2018 Games	Buenos Aires, Argentina	
Javelin throw (500 g)	63.34 m	Elina Tzengko	Greece	13 October 2018	2018 Games	Buenos Aires, Argentina	
5000 m race walk (track)	22:22.08	Ma Zhenxia	China	23 August 2014	2014 Games	Nanjing, China	
