= All-time Youth Olympic Games medal table =

Olympics edition for age group 14 to 18

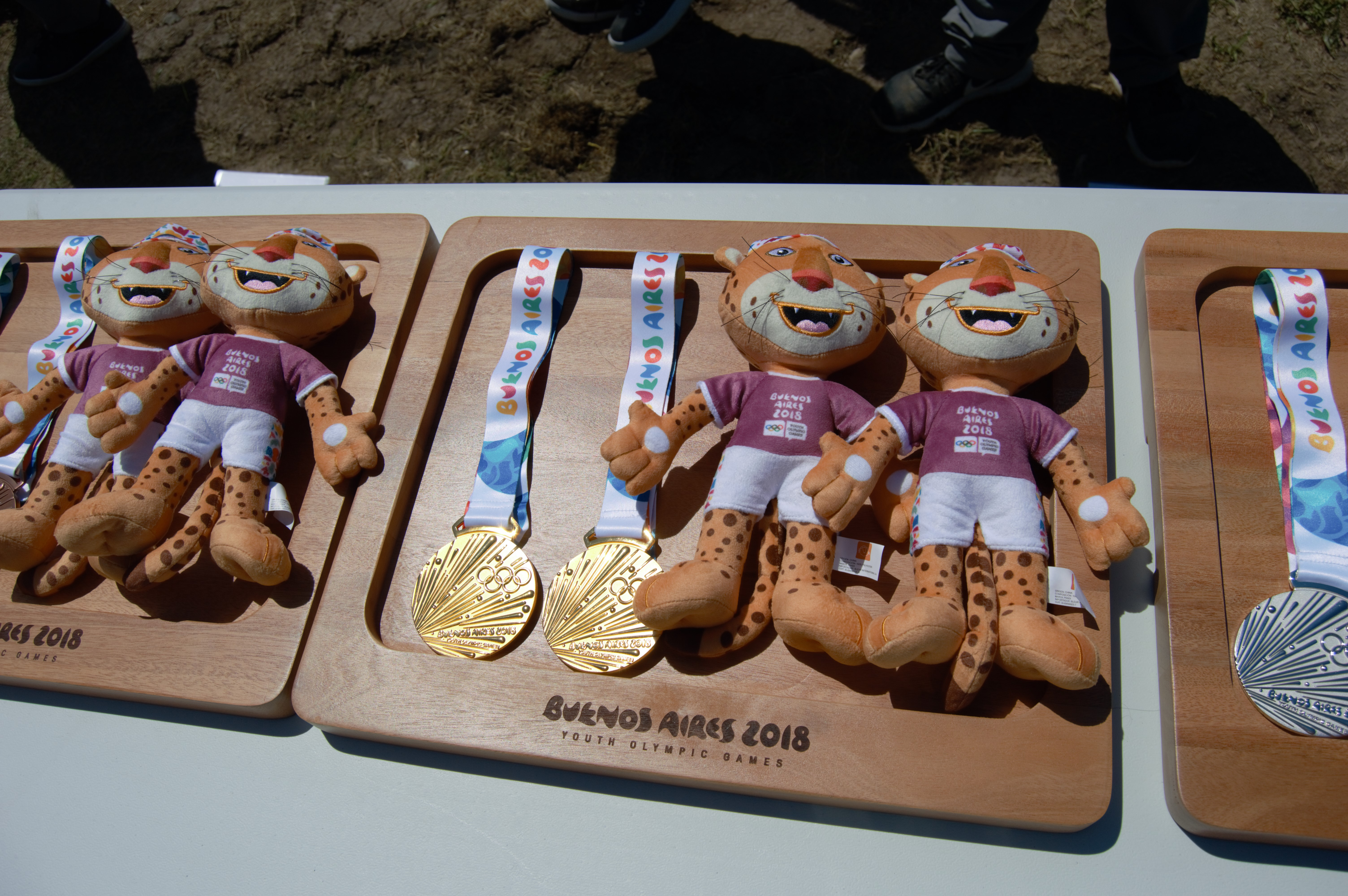
Medals and Mascots of the 2018 Youth Olympic Games, delivered during Victory ceremonies to medal winners.

An all-time medal table for all Youth Olympic Games (YOG) from 2010 to 2026 is tabulated below. This is a summary of medal tables published by IOC on every YOG edition. A total of 136 nations have won at least one medal in the Youth Olympic Games, 133 in the Summer Games and 44 in the Winter Games.

== Combined total ==
Last updated after the 2026 Summer Youth Olympics.

Rank	Nation	Gold	Silver	Bronze	Total
1	China	123	67	48	238
2	Russia	104	78	60	242
3	Japan	57	54	47	158
–	Mixed-NOCs	48	46	52	146
4	South Korea	45	32	29	106
5	Germany	41	49	51	141
6	United States	41	44	38	123
7	Italy	41	39	42	122
8	France	36	38	46	120
9	Hungary	27	23	25	75
10	Ukraine	25	29	34	88
11	Austria	23	17	33	73
12	Switzerland	22	14	30	66
13	Sweden	21	16	18	55
14	Great Britain	18	14	25	57
15	Australia	17	33	32	82
16	Cuba	16	4	5	25
17	Azerbaijan	15	13	4	32
18	Argentina	15	10	19	44
19	Norway	13	21	21	55
20	Canada	13	16	33	62
21	Brazil	13	16	11	40
22	Slovenia	13	13	14	40
23	Iran	13	9	11	33
24	Egypt	13	6	19	38
25	Netherlands	12	12	16	40
26	Ethiopia	12	11	6	29
27	Kazakhstan	12	10	18	40
28	Kenya	12	5	4	21
29	Thailand	11	12	6	29
30	Romania	10	12	6	28
31	Czech Republic	9	15	17	41
32	Spain	9	14	26	49
33	New Zealand	9	10	10	29
34	South Africa	9	10	7	26
35	Poland	9	1	13	23
36	Uzbekistan	8	14	15	37
37	Colombia	8	10	9	27
38	Lithuania	8	6	5	19
39	Turkey	7	10	24	41
40	Croatia	7	7	4	18
41	Finland	7	5	12	24
42	Belgium	6	8	12	26
43	Bulgaria	6	7	5	18
44	Jamaica	6	4	2	12
45	Nigeria	6	3	2	11
46	India	5	19	9	33
47	Belarus	5	11	8	24
48	Chinese Taipei	5	11	7	23
49	Latvia	5	7	7	19
50	Greece	5	6	6	17
51	Senegal	5	0	7	12
52	Venezuela	4	11	6	21
53	Denmark	4	6	5	15
54	Israel	4	5	4	13
55	Vietnam	4	5	2	11
56	North Korea	4	3	3	10
57	Dominican Republic	4	1	2	7
58	Mexico	3	12	28	43
59	Slovakia	3	10	11	24
60	Portugal	3	6	4	13
61	Singapore	3	4	5	12
62	Armenia	3	3	8	14
63	Ecuador	3	3	2	8
64	Moldova	3	2	5	10
65	Jordan	3	2	2	7
66	Georgia	2	8	5	15
66	Hong Kong	2	8	5	15
68	Serbia	2	7	4	13
69	Morocco	2	6	6	14
70	Mongolia	2	3	3	8
71	Malaysia	2	3	1	6
72	United Arab Emirates	2	2	2	6
73	Puerto Rico	2	1	2	5
74	Qatar	2	1	1	4
75	Saudi Arabia	2	0	3	5
76	Uruguay	2	0	0	2
77	Tunisia	1	5	3	9
78	Ireland	1	4	3	8
79	Kyrgyzstan	1	3	4	8
80	Cyprus	1	2	4	7
81	Estonia	1	2	2	5
82	Trinidad and Tobago	1	2	1	4
83	Uganda	1	1	5	7
84	Eritrea	1	1	3	5
85	Zambia	1	1	2	4
86	Burundi	1	1	1	3
87	Peru	1	0	2	3
88	Bolivia	1	0	1	2
88	Chile	1	0	1	2
88	Iceland	1	0	1	2
88	Kuwait	1	0	1	2
92	Ghana	1	0	0	1
92	Mauritius	1	0	0	1
92	Paraguay	1	0	0	1
92	Suriname	1	0	0	1
92	Virgin Islands	1	0	0	1
92	Zimbabwe	1	0	0	1
98	Algeria	0	6	1	7
99	Philippines	0	2	1	3
100	Botswana	0	2	0	2
100	Luxembourg	0	2	0	2
102	Indonesia	0	1	5	6
103	Bahamas	0	1	2	3
104	Bahrain	0	1	1	2
104	Bosnia and Herzegovina	0	1	1	2
104	Lebanon	0	1	1	2
104	Pakistan	0	1	1	2
104	Sri Lanka	0	1	1	2
104	Tajikistan	0	1	1	2
110	Antigua and Barbuda	0	1	0	1
110	El Salvador	0	1	0	1
110	Equatorial Guinea	0	1	0	1
110	Guyana	0	1	0	1
110	Haiti	0	1	0	1
110	Nauru	0	1	0	1
110	Saint Lucia	0	1	0	1
110	The Gambia	0	1	0	1
118	Niger	0	0	3	3
119	Burkina Faso	0	0	2	2
120	Afghanistan	0	0	1	1
120	Andorra	0	0	1	1
120	Cambodia	0	0	1	1
120	Democratic Republic of the Congo	0	0	1	1
120	Djibouti	0	0	1	1
120	Fiji	0	0	1	1
120	Grenada	0	0	1	1
120	Guatemala	0	0	1	1
120	Honduras	0	0	1	1
120	Iraq	0	0	1	1
120	Kosovo	0	0	1	1
120	Liechtenstein	0	0	1	1
120	Madagascar	0	0	1	1
120	Monaco	0	0	1	1
120	Netherlands Antilles	0	0	1	1
120	North Macedonia	0	0	1	1
120	Turkmenistan	0	0	1	1
Totals (136 entries)		1,117	1,103	1,200	3,420

== By Games ==
=== Summer Games ===
As of 2026 Summer Youth Olympics.

World map showing nations that have won Summer Youth Olympics medals, as of completion of the 2026 Summer Youth Olympics Legend: represents countries that won at least one gold medal. represents countries that won at least one silver medal but no gold medals. represents countries that won at least one bronze medal (no gold or silver). represents participating countries that did not win medals. countries that never participated at the Summer Youth Olympic Games

Rank	Nation	Gold	Silver	Bronze	Total
1	China	104	46	35	185
2	Russia	82	55	36	173
3	Japan	41	34	29	104
–	Mixed-NOCs	35	33	38	106
4	Hungary	26	20	23	69
5	Italy	25	29	28	82
6	Ukraine	24	27	32	83
7	France	23	25	27	75
8	United States	22	21	24	67
9	South Korea	17	17	20	54
10	Australia	16	28	28	72
11	Cuba	16	4	5	25
12	Azerbaijan	15	13	4	32
13	Argentina	15	10	19	44
14	Brazil	13	16	10	39
15	Iran	13	9	11	33
16	Egypt	13	6	19	38
17	Germany	12	23	29	64
18	Great Britain	12	11	22	45
19	Ethiopia	12	11	6	29
20	Kenya	12	5	4	21
21	Thailand	11	11	6	28
22	Kazakhstan	11	9	12	32
23	South Africa	9	10	7	26
24	Uzbekistan	8	14	15	37
25	Colombia	8	9	9	26
26	New Zealand	8	7	4	19
27	Lithuania	8	6	5	19
28	Romania	7	12	5	24
29	Turkey	7	9	24	40
30	Croatia	7	7	4	18
31	Slovenia	7	4	9	20
32	Poland	7	1	11	19
33	Spain	6	13	22	41
34	Czech Republic	6	9	12	27
35	Bulgaria	6	7	4	17
36	Sweden	6	4	8	18
37	Jamaica	6	4	2	12
38	Nigeria	6	3	2	11
39	India	5	19	9	33
40	Chinese Taipei	5	11	7	23
41	Belarus	5	10	7	22
42	Belgium	5	6	12	23
43	Greece	5	6	6	17
44	Senegal	5	0	7	12
45	Venezuela	4	11	6	21
46	Canada	4	9	20	33
47	Vietnam	4	5	2	11
48	Switzerland	4	4	6	14
49	Israel	4	4	3	11
50	North Korea	4	3	3	10
51	Austria	4	2	15	21
52	Dominican Republic	4	1	2	7
53	Mexico	3	12	28	43
54	Netherlands	3	8	11	22
55	Portugal	3	6	4	13
56	Singapore	3	4	5	12
57	Armenia	3	3	8	14
58	Denmark	3	3	5	11
59	Ecuador	3	3	2	8
60	Moldova	3	2	5	10
61	Jordan	3	2	2	7
62	Norway	3	1	7	11
63	Hong Kong	2	8	5	15
64	Georgia	2	8	4	14
65	Slovakia	2	7	8	17
66	Serbia	2	7	4	13
67	Mongolia	2	3	3	8
68	Malaysia	2	3	1	6
69	United Arab Emirates	2	2	2	6
70	Puerto Rico	2	1	2	5
71	Qatar	2	1	1	4
72	Saudi Arabia	2	0	3	5
73	Uruguay	2	0	0	2
74	Morocco	1	6	6	13
75	Ireland	1	4	3	8
75	Tunisia	1	4	3	8
77	Kyrgyzstan	1	3	4	8
78	Cyprus	1	2	4	7
79	Trinidad and Tobago	1	2	1	4
80	Uganda	1	1	5	7
81	Eritrea	1	1	3	5
82	Zambia	1	1	2	4
83	Burundi	1	1	1	3
84	Finland	1	0	3	4
85	Peru	1	0	2	3
86	Bolivia	1	0	1	2
86	Chile	1	0	1	2
86	Iceland	1	0	1	2
86	Kuwait	1	0	1	2
90	Ghana	1	0	0	1
90	Mauritius	1	0	0	1
90	Paraguay	1	0	0	1
90	Suriname	1	0	0	1
90	Virgin Islands	1	0	0	1
90	Zimbabwe	1	0	0	1
96	Algeria	0	6	1	7
97	Philippines	0	2	1	3
98	Botswana	0	2	0	2
98	Luxembourg	0	2	0	2
100	Indonesia	0	1	5	6
101	Bahamas	0	1	2	3
102	Bahrain	0	1	1	2
102	Bosnia and Herzegovina	0	1	1	2
102	Lebanon	0	1	1	2
102	Pakistan	0	1	1	2
102	Sri Lanka	0	1	1	2
102	Tajikistan	0	1	1	2
108	Antigua and Barbuda	0	1	0	1
108	El Salvador	0	1	0	1
108	Equatorial Guinea	0	1	0	1
108	Guyana	0	1	0	1
108	Haiti	0	1	0	1
108	Nauru	0	1	0	1
108	Saint Lucia	0	1	0	1
108	The Gambia	0	1	0	1
116	Latvia	0	0	3	3
116	Niger	0	0	3	3
118	Burkina Faso	0	0	2	2
118	Estonia	0	0	2	2
120	Afghanistan	0	0	1	1
120	Cambodia	0	0	1	1
120	Democratic Republic of the Congo	0	0	1	1
120	Djibouti	0	0	1	1
120	Fiji	0	0	1	1
120	Grenada	0	0	1	1
120	Guatemala	0	0	1	1
120	Honduras	0	0	1	1
120	Iraq	0	0	1	1
120	Kosovo	0	0	1	1
120	Madagascar	0	0	1	1
120	Netherlands Antilles	0	0	1	1
120	North Macedonia	0	0	1	1
120	Turkmenistan	0	0	1	1
Totals (133 entries)		818	810	905	2,533

=== Winter Games ===
As of 2024 Winter Youth Olympics.

World map showing nations that have won Winter Youth Olympics medals, as of completion of the 2024 Winter Youth Olympics Legend: represents countries that won at least one gold medal. represents countries that won at least one silver medal but no gold medals. represents countries that won at least one bronze medal (no gold or silver). represents participating countries that did not win medals. countries that never participated at the Winter Youth Olympics

Rank	Nation	Gold	Silver	Bronze	Total
1	Germany	29	26	22	77
2	South Korea	28	15	9	52
3	Russia	22	23	24	69
4	United States	19	23	14	56
5	China	19	21	13	53
6	Austria	19	15	18	52
7	Switzerland	18	10	24	52
8	Japan	16	20	18	54
9	Italy	16	10	14	40
10	Sweden	15	12	10	37
11	France	13	13	19	45
–	Mixed-NOCs	13	13	14	40
12	Norway	10	20	14	44
13	Canada	9	7	13	29
14	Netherlands	9	4	5	18
15	Slovenia	6	9	5	20
16	Finland	6	5	9	20
17	Great Britain	6	3	3	12
18	Latvia	5	7	4	16
19	Czech Republic	3	6	5	14
20	Spain	3	1	4	8
21	Romania	3	0	1	4
22	Poland	2	0	2	4
23	Australia	1	5	4	10
24	New Zealand	1	3	6	10
25	Slovakia	1	3	3	7
26	Hungary	1	3	2	6
27	Denmark	1	3	0	4
28	Ukraine	1	2	2	5
29	Belgium	1	2	0	3
29	Estonia	1	2	0	3
31	Kazakhstan	1	1	6	8
32	Morocco	1	0	0	1
33	Belarus	0	1	1	2
33	Israel	0	1	1	2
35	Colombia	0	1	0	1
35	Thailand	0	1	0	1
35	Tunisia	0	1	0	1
35	Turkey	0	1	0	1
39	Andorra	0	0	1	1
39	Brazil	0	0	1	1
39	Bulgaria	0	0	1	1
39	Georgia	0	0	1	1
39	Liechtenstein	0	0	1	1
39	Monaco	0	0	1	1
Totals (44 entries)		299	293	295	887

== See also ==
- All-time Olympic Games medal table
- All-time Paralympic Games medal table
- All-time Universiade medal table
