= Great Britain at the Youth Olympics =

- IOC code: GBR
- NOC: British Olympic Committee
- Website: www.teamgb.com
- Medals Ranked 15th: Gold 17 Silver 13 Bronze 23 Total 53

Summer appearances
- 2010; 2014; 2018

Winter appearances
- 2012; 2016; 2020; 2024

Great Britain has participated at the Youth Olympic Games in every edition since the inaugural 2010 Games and has earned medals from every edition.

== Bids ==
=== Unsuccessful Bids ===
Games	City	Winner of bid
2018 Summer Youth Olympics	Glasgow	Buenos Aires, Argentina

== Medal tables ==
=== Medals by Summer Games ===
Games	Athletes	Gold	Silver	Bronze	Total	Rank
2010 Singapore	39	3	1	5	9	17
(China) 2014 Nanjing	33	5	5	10	20	11
(Argentina) 2018 Buenos Aires	43	3	4	5	12	18
(Senegal) 2026 Dakar	Future event					
Total		11	10	20	41	15

=== Medals by Winter Games ===
Games	Athletes	Gold	Silver	Bronze	Total	Rank
(Austria) 2012 Innsbruck	24	0	1	0	1	24
(Norway) 2016 Lillehammer	16	2	0	2	4	14
(Switzerland) 2020 Lausanne	28	0	1	0	1	27
(South Korea) 2024 Gangwon	39	4	1	1	6	9
Total		6	3	3	12	17

=== Medals by summer sport ===
Sport	Gold	Silver	Bronze	Total
Gymnastics	4	5	6	15
Boxing	3	0	3	6
Swimming	1	3	3	7
Taekwondo	1	0	2	3
Rowing	1	0	0	1
Triathlon	1	0	0	1
Diving	0	1	0	1
Modern pentathlon	0	1	0	1
Athletics	0	0	2	2
Sailing	0	0	2	2
Cycling	0	0	1	1
Karate	0	0	1	1
Totals (12 entries)	11	10	20	41

=== Medals by winter sport ===
Sport	Gold	Silver	Bronze	Total
Alpine skiing	2	1	0	3
Curling	2	0	0	2
Freestyle skiing	1	1	1	3
Skeleton	1	0	0	1
Bobsleigh	0	1	1	2
Figure skating	0	0	1	1
Totals (6 entries)	6	3	3	12

== See also ==
- Great Britain at the Olympics
- Great Britain at the Paralympics
