= Japan at the Youth Olympics =

- IOC code: JPN
- NOC: Japanese Olympic Committee
- Website: joc.or.jp (in Japanese)
- Medals Ranked 3rd: Gold 46 Silver 46 Bronze 38 Total 130

Summer appearances
- 2010; 2014; 2018

Winter appearances
- 2012; 2016; 2020; 2024

Japan has participated at the Youth Olympic Games in every edition since the inaugural 2010 Games and has earned medals from every edition.

== Medal tables ==
=== Medals by Summer Games ===
Games	Athletes	Gold	Silver	Bronze	Total	Rank
2010 Singapore	71	8	5	3	16	7
(China) 2014 Nanjing	78	7	9	5	21	5
(Argentina) 2018 Buenos Aires	96	15	12	12	39	3
(Senegal) 2026 Dakar	Future event					
Total		30	26	20	76	3

=== Medals by Winter Games ===
Games	Athletes	Gold	Silver	Bronze	Total	Rank
(Austria) 2012 Innsbruck	33	2	5	9	16	8
(Norway) 2016 Lillehammer	29	2	4	0	6	11
(Switzerland) 2020 Lausanne	72	9	7	1	17	3
(South Korea) 2024 Gangwon	65	3	4	8	15	10
Total		16	20	18	54	8

=== Medals by summer sport ===
Leading in that sport

Sport	Gold	Silver	Bronze	Total
Gymnastics	7	3	3	13
Wrestling	6	0	2	8
Athletics	3	7	3	13
Swimming	3	2	5	10
Judo	3	0	1	4
Boxing	2	1	1	4
Tennis	1	3	1	5
Karate	1	3	0	4
Fencing	1	1	1	3
Breaking	1	0	1	2
Futsal	0	1	0	1
Cycling	0	0	1	1
Rugby sevens	0	0	1	1
Archery	0	0	0	0
Basketball	0	0	0	0
Beach volleyball	0	0	0	0
Canoeing	0	0	0	0
Diving	0	0	0	0
Handball	0	0	0	0
Modern pentathlon	0	0	0	0
Sailing	0	0	0	0
Shooting	0	0	0	0
Taekwondo	0	0	0	0
Volleyball	0	0	0	0
Weightlifting	0	0	0	0
Totals (25 entries)	28	21	20	69

=== Medals by winter sport ===
Leading in that sport

Sport	Gold	Silver	Bronze	Total
Snowboarding	7	4	1	12
Speed skating	3	6	7	16
Figure skating	3	1	1	5
Ice hockey	2	1	1	4
Ski jumping	1	1	1	3
Freestyle skiing	0	2	1	3
Nordic combined	0	1	1	2
Short track speed skating	0	1	1	2
Alpine skiing	0	1	0	1
Cross-country skiing	0	1	0	1
Curling	0	1	0	1
Totals (11 entries)	16	20	14	50

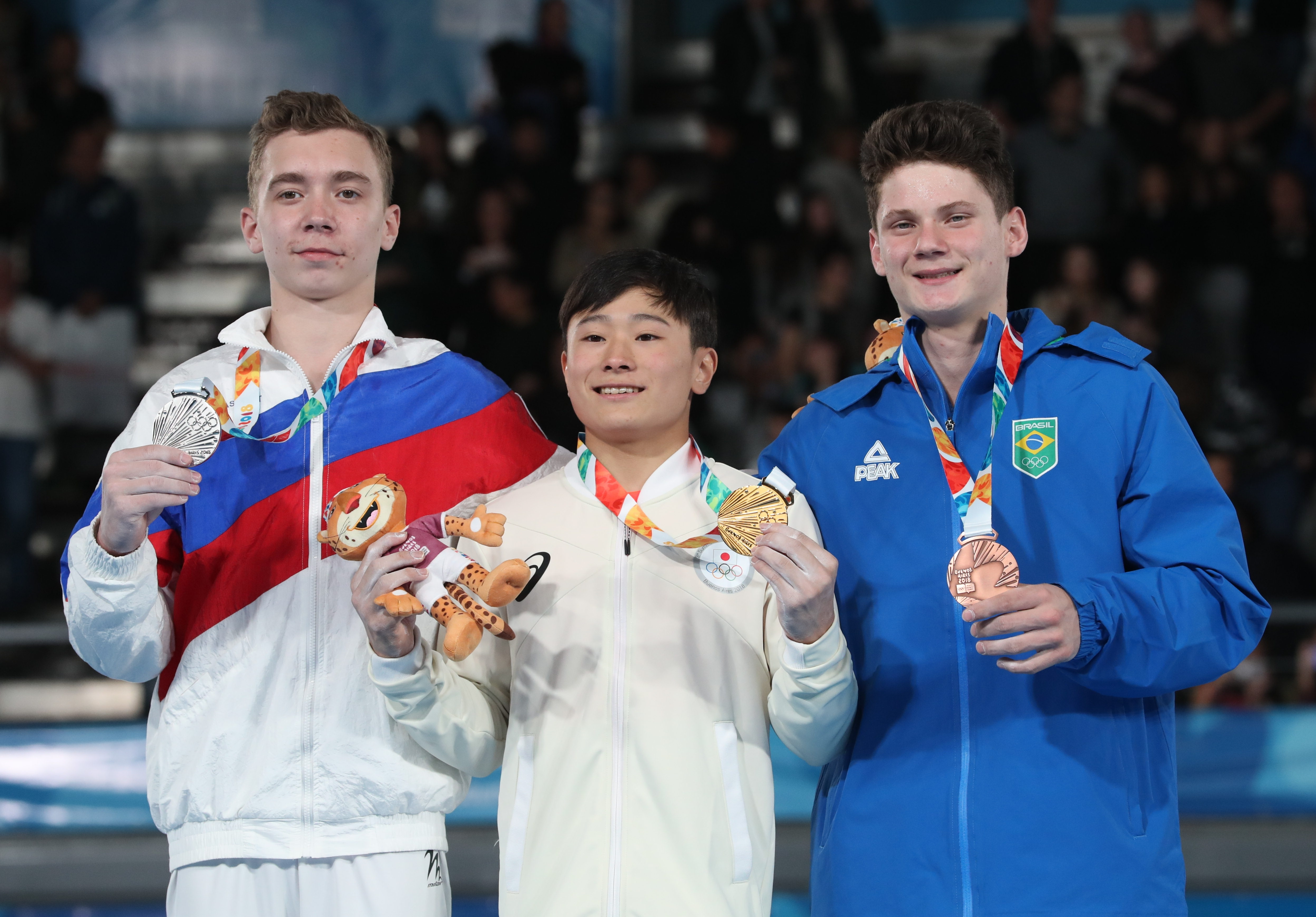
Takeru Kitazono is Japan's most successful athlete at the Youth Olympic Games, he won 5 gold medals at the Buenos Aires 2018.

== Flag bearers ==
#	Games	Season	Flag bearer	Sport
1	2010 Singapore	Summer	Ayuka Tanioka	Table tennis
2	2012 Innsbruck	Winter	Sumire Kikuchi	Speed skating
3	2014 Nanjing	Summer	Akane Yamaguchi	Badminton
4	2016 Lillehammer	Winter	Masamitsu Ito	Nordic combined Ski jumping
5	2018 Buenos Aires	Summer	Yuka Kagami	Wrestling
6	2020 Lausanne	Winter	Yuma Kagiyama	Figure skating
7	2024 Gangwon	Winter	Kaito Fujii; Yuzuki Sato	Curling; Ski jumping

== See also ==
- Japan at the Olympics
- Japan at the Paralympics
