= Philippines at the Youth Olympics =

- Flag of the Philippines
- IOC code: PHI
- NOC: Philippine Olympic Committee
- Website: www.olympic.ph
- Medals Ranked 99th: Gold 0 Silver 2 Bronze 1 Total 3

Summer appearances
- 2010; 2014; 2018; 2026

Winter appearances
- 2012; 2016; 2020; 2024

The Philippines first participated at the Youth Olympic Games at the inaugural 2010 Games. Philippines have participated in every edition of Summer Youth Olympics and three editions of the Winter Youth Olympics, the 2012, 2020 and 2024 Games.

== Medal table ==
=== Medals by Summer Games ===
Games	Athletes	Gold	Silver	Bronze	Total	Rank
2010 Singapore	9	0	0	0	0	–
(China) 2014 Nanjing	7	0*	0	0	0*	–*
(Argentina) 2018 Buenos Aires	7	0	1	0	1	79
(Senegal) 2026 Dakar	9	0	1	1	2	69

*Excluding gold medal won at the 2014 Summer Youth Olympics which was credited to Mixed NOCs.

Medals by sport

Sport	Gold	Silver	Bronze	Total
Sailing	0	1	0	1
Athletics	0	1	1	2
Total	0	2	1	3

=== Medals by Winter Games ===
Games	Athletes	Gold	Silver	Bronze	Total	Rank
(Austria) 2012 Innsbruck	2	0	0	0	0	–
(Norway) 2016 Lillehammer	did not participate					
(Switzerland) 2020 Lausanne	2	0	0	0	0	–
(South Korea) 2024 Gangwon	3	0	0	0	0	–

=== Medals by Mixed-NOCs participation ===
Mixed-NOCs (IOC code: MIX) are Youth Olympic Games teams consisting of athletes representing different National Olympic Committees (NOCs). The concept of mixed-NOCs was introduced at the 2010 Summer Youth Olympics, in which athletes from different nations would compete in the same team. It was also used in multiple sports at the Winter Youth Olympics since 2012.

Medals by Summer Games

Games	Athletes	Gold	Silver	Bronze	Total
2010 Singapore	1	0	0	0	0
(China) 2014 Nanjing	2	1	0	0	1
(Argentina) 2018 Buenos Aires	2	0	0	0	0

Medals by sport

Sport	Gold	Silver	Bronze	Total
Archery	1	0	0	1
Total	1	0	0	1

Medals by Winter Games

Games	Athletes	Gold	Silver	Bronze	Total
(Austria) 2012 Innsbruck	did not participate				
(Norway) 2016 Lillehammer	did not participate				
(Switzerland) 2020 Lausanne	1	0	0	0	0

== Flag bearers ==
#	Event year	Season	Flag bearer	Sport
7	2026	Summer	Jamesray Ajido Riannah Coleman	Swimming
6	2024	Winter	Laetaz Rabe	Alpine Skiing
5	2020	Winter	Ana Wahleithner	Alpine Skiing
4	2018	Summer	Yuka Saso	Golf
3	2014	Summer	Luis Gabriel Moreno	Archery
2	2012	Winter	Abel Tesfamariam	Alpine Skiing
1	2010	Summer	Patricia Llena	Weightlifting

== List of medalists ==
Only Christian Tio of sailing and Naomi Cesar and Pi Durden Wangkay of athletics have won a medal credited to the National Olympic Committee of the Philippines, two silvers and a bronze. Another medal, a gold medal was won by Luis Gabriel Moreno along with Li Jiaman of China as part of a Mixed-NOCs team. The medal is neither credited to the Philippines or China.

== See also ==
- Philippines at the Olympics
- Philippines at the Paralympics
