= Volleyball at the Summer Youth Olympics =

- Events: 0 (mixed)

Games
- 2010; 2014; 2018; 2026

Volleyball at the Summer Youth Olympics
- Governing body: FIVB
- Events: 0 (mixed)

Games
- 2010; 2014; 2018; 2026

Volleyball has been part of every Summer Youth Olympics. Indoor volleyball was played at the 2010 Summer Youth Olympics. At the 2014 Summer Youth Olympics it was replaced by beach volleyball, which has continued at subsequent editions.

== Medal table ==
As of the 2026 Summer Youth Olympics.

Rank	Nation	Gold	Silver	Bronze	Total
1	Russia	2	0	1	3
2	Netherlands	1	1	0	2
3	Austria	1	0	0	1
3	Belgium	1	0	0	1
3	Brazil	1	0	0	1
3	Cuba	1	0	0	1
3	Sweden	1	0	0	1
8	Italy	0	2	0	2
9	Argentina	0	1	2	3
10	Germany	0	1	1	2
11	Canada	0	1	0	1
11	United States	0	1	0	1
11	Venezuela	0	1	0	1
14	Australia	0	0	1	1
14	Norway	0	0	1	1
14	Peru	0	0	1	1
14	Switzerland	0	0	1	1
Totals (17 entries)		8	8	8	24

== Boys' tournament ==
Year	Host	Gold medal match			Bronze medal match			Teams
Year	Host	Gold Medalists	Score	Silver Medalists	Bronze Medalists	Score	4th place	Teams
2010; Details	Singapore	Cuba	3–1	Argentina	Russia	3–0	Serbia	6
2014; Details	(China); Nanjing	(Russia); Oleg Stoyanovskiy and Artem Yarzutkin	2–0	(Venezuela); José Tigrito Gómez and Rolando Hernández	(Argentina); Santiago Aulisi and Leo Aveiro	2–1	(Finland); Miro Määttänen and Santeri Sirén	36
2018; Details	(Argentina); Buenos Aires	(Sweden); David Åhman and Jonatan Hellvig	2–0	(Netherlands); Yorick de Groot and Matthew Immers	(Argentina); Mauro Zelayeta and Bautista Amieva	2–0	(Hungary); Bence Attila Streli and Artur Hajós	32
2026; Details	(Senegal); Dakar	(Austria); Paul Hohenauer and Martin Poinstingl	2–1	(Germany); Lasse Hüper and Filo Wüst	(Australia); Ryan Edgar and Thomas Turner	2–0	(Brazil); Gabriel Campos and Bruno Fellipe	24

=== Team appearances ===
Team	(Singapore) 2010	(China) 2014	(Argentina) 2018	(Senegal) 2026
Argentina	2nd	3rd	3rd	-
Aruba	-	-	25th	-
Australia	-	-	9th	3rd
Austria	-	9th	-	1st
Bolivia	-	-	25th	-
Brazil	-	5th	17th	4th
Burundi	-	31st	-	-
Canada	-	9th	-	-
Cayman Islands	-	-	-	19th
Chile	-	-	17th	5th
Republic of the Congo	-	25th	-	-
Democratic Republic of the Congo	5th	-	-	9th
Costa Rica	-	-	9th	-
Cuba	1st	-	5th	-
Czech Republic	-	-	25th	-
Ecuador	-	-	9th	-
Finland	-	4th	-	-
France	-	9th	-	-
The Gambia	-	-	17th	-
Germany	-	5th	5th	2nd
Ghana	-	17th	17th	9th
Great Britain	-	-	5th	-
Guatemala	-	25th	-	19th
Hungary	-	-	4th	-
Indonesia	-	9th	9th	-
Iran	6ht	25th	-	5th
Jamaica	-	31st	-	-
Kazakhstan	-	17th	-	9th
Lithuania	-	17th	-	-
Mauritius	-	-	25th	-
Monaco	-	-	25th	-
Morocco	-	-	-	17th
Mozambique	-	-	9th	-
Namibia	-	-	-	19th
Netherlands	-	-	2nd	-
New Zealand	-	17th	25th	-
Nicaragua	-	-	-	9th
Nigeria	-	31st	-	-
Norway	-	9th	-	5th
Oman	-	17th	-	-
Palau	-	-	-	17th
Paraguay	-	9th	17th	-
Peru	-	17th	-	-
Poland	-	17th	17th	-
Puerto Rico	-	5th	17th	-
Russia	3rd	1st	9th	-
Rwanda	-	31st	-	-
Saint Vincent and the Grenadines	-	25th	25th	-
São Tomé and Príncipe	-	25th	-	-
Saudi Arabia	-	-	-	19th
Senegal	-	-	-	9th
Serbia	4th	-	-	-
Sierra Leone	-	31st	-	9th
South Africa	4th	-	-	19th
Sri Lanka	-	17th	-	-
Sweden	-	-	1st	19th
Switzerland	-	-	9th	-
Thailand	-	9th	9th	-
Togo	-	-	25th	-
Turkey	-	-	-	9th
Ukraine	-	9th	-	-
United States	-	25th	5th	5th
Uruguay	-	5th	-	-
Venezuela	-	2nd	17th	9th
Virgin Islands	-	31st	-	-

== Girls' tournament ==
Year	Host	Gold medal match			Bronze medal match			Teams
Year	Host	Gold Medalists	Score	Silver Medalists	Bronze Medalists	Score	4th place	Teams
2010; Details	Singapore	Belgium	3–1	United States	Peru	3–1	Japan	6
2014; Details	(China); Nanjing	(Brazil); Ana Patricia Silva Ramos and Eduarda Santos Lisboa	2–1	(Canada); Megan McNamara and Nicole McNamara	(Germany); Lisa Arnholdt and Sarah Schneider	2–0	(Russia); Nadezda Makroguzova and Daria Rudykh	36
2018; Details	(Argentina); Buenos Aires	(Russia); Maria Voronina and Mariia Bocharova	2–0	(Italy); Claudia Scampoli and Nicol Bertozzi	(Norway); Frida Berntsen and Emelie Olimstad	2–1	(United States); Devon Newberry and Lindsey Sparks	32
2026; Details	(Senegal); Dakar	(Netherlands); Jara Both and Matilda de Groot	2–1	(Italy); Margherita Coretti and Micol Lafuenti	(Switzerland); Noemi Eugster and Anja Gähwiler	2–0	(China); Qi Siyu and Ming Zhuang	24

=== Team appearances ===
Team	(Singapore) 2010	(China) 2014	(Argentina) 2018	(Senegal) 2026
Argentina	-	5th	9th	5th
Aruba	-	-	17th	-
Australia	-	17th	25th	-
Austria	-	5th	-	-
Belgium	1st	-	-	-
Bolivia	-	17th	9th	-
Brazil	-	1st	9th	-
Canada	-	2nd	17th	9th
Cape Verde	-	-	-	19th
China	-	25th	5th	4th
Republic of the Congo	-	31st	-	-
Democratic Republic of the Congo	-	-	25th	-
Czech Republic	-	5th	-	-
Dominica	-	-	25th	-
Dominican Republic	-	-	-	9th
Ecuador	-	17th	25th	19th
Egypt	5th	-	25th	9th
France	-	17th	-	9th
The Gambia	-	-	-	19th
Germany	-	3rd	-	-
Ghana	-	31st	-	-
Greece	-	-	-	5th
Guam	-	-	-	19th
Guatemala	-	25th	17th	-
Indonesia	-	17th	-	-
Italy	-	9th	2nd	2nd
Japan	4th	-	-	19th
Kazakhstan	-	25th	-	-
Latvia	-	9th	-	-
Malaysia	-	-	-	9th
Mexico	-	-	9th	5th
Mozambique	-	-	17th	17th
Namibia	-	31st	-	-
Netherlands	-	-	9th	1st
New Zealand	-	-	17th	-
Nigeria	-	31st	-	5th
Norway	-	-	3rd	-
Paraguay	-	9th	17th	9th
Peru	3rd	-	9th	-
Poland	-	-	17th	-
Puerto Rico	-	9th	5th	17th
Russia	-	4th	1st	-
Rwanda	-	25th	25th	-
Saint Lucia	-	17th	-	-
Senegal	-	-	-	9th
Sierra Leone	-	31st	25th	-
Singapore	6th	-	-	-
Spain	-	-	5th	-
Switzerland	-	9th	9th	3rd
Chinese Taipei	-	17th	-	-
Thailand	-	9th	5th	9th
Trinidad and Tobago	-	17th	-	-
Tunisia	-	-	-	19th
Turkey	-	9th	-	-
Tuvalu	-	25th	-	-
United States	2nd	5th	4th	-
Uruguay	-	9th	17th	-
Vanuatu	-	31st	25th	-
Venezuela	-	-	9th	-
Vietnam	-	25th	-	-
