= Spain at the Youth Olympics =

- Flag of Spain
- IOC code: ESP
- NOC: Spanish Olympic Committee
- Medals Ranked 41st: Gold 5 Silver 9 Bronze 21 Total 35

Summer appearances
- 2010; 2014; 2018; 2026

Winter appearances
- 2012; 2016; 2020; 2024

Spain has sent athletes to every celebration of the Youth Olympic Games. The Spanish Olympic Committee (COE) is the National Olympic Committee for Spain.

Spanish athletes have won a total of 29 medals (4 of them gold) at the Summer Youth Olympic Games and another 8 at the Winter Youth Olympic Games.

Spain has never topped the gold medal count.

== Medal tables ==
=== Medals by Summer Games ===
Games	Athletes	Gold	Silver	Bronze	Total	Rank
2010 Singapore	46	1	4	6	11	33
(China) 2014 Nanjing	66	2	1	6	9	32
(Argentina) 2018 Buenos Aires	85	1	3	5	9	46
(Senegal) 2026 Dakar	44	2	5	5	12	18
Total		6	13	22	41	33

=== Medals by Winter Games ===
Games	Athletes	Gold	Silver	Bronze	Total	Rank
(Austria) 2012 Innsbruck	9	0	0	0	0	–
(Norway) 2016 Lillehammer	6	0	0	0	0	–
(Switzerland) 2020 Lausanne	24	1	1	3	5	19
(South Korea) 2024 Gangwon	29	0	0	1	1	30
Total		1	1	4	8	20

=== Medals by summer sport ===
Medals awarded to participants of mixed-NOC (Combined) teams are represented in italics in each edition's page. These medals are not counted towards the individual NOC medal tally.

Leading in that sport

Sport	Gold	Silver	Bronze	Total
Athletics	2	1	2	5
Judo	1	0	3	4
Basketball	1	0	1	2
Beach handball	1	0	0	1
Swimming	0	3	3	6
Gymnastics	0	2	2	4
Archery	0	1	0	1
Sailing	0	1	0	1
Triathlon	0	1	0	1
Canoeing	0	0	3	3
Taekwondo	0	0	2	2
Field hockey	0	0	1	1
Futsal	0	0	1	1
Boxing	0	0	0	0
Diving	0	0	0	0
Fencing	0	0	0	0
Golf	0	0	0	0
Table tennis	0	0	0	0
Volleyball	0	0	0	0
Weightlifting	0	0	0	0
Wrestling	0	0	0	0
Totals (21 entries)	5	9	18	32

=== Medals by winter sport ===
Leading in that sport

Sport	Gold	Silver	Bronze	Total
Ice hockey	2	0	0	2
Ski mountaineering	1	0	2	3
Speed skating	0	1	0	1
Figure skating	0	0	1	1
Snowboarding	0	0	1	1
Alpine skiing	0	0	0	0
Biathlon	0	0	0	0
Cross-country skiing	0	0	0	0
Curling	0	0	0	0
Figure skating	0	0	0	0
Freestyle skiing	0	0	0	0
Luge	0	0	0	0
Nordic combined	0	0	0	0
Short track speed skating	0	0	0	0
Ski jumping	0	0	0	0
Totals (15 entries)	3	1	4	8

== See also ==
- Spain at the Olympics
- Spain at the Paralympics
