= Turkmenistan at the Youth Olympics =

Performance of Turkmenistan at the Youth Olympic Games

- IOC code: TKM
- NOC: National Olympic Committee of Turkmenistan
- Website: olympic.tm/en
- Medals Ranked 120th: Gold 0 Silver 0 Bronze 1 Total 1

Summer appearances
- 2010; 2014; 2018; 2026

Winter appearances
- 2020; 2024

Turkmenistan has participated every edition at the Summer Youth Olympic Games since the inaugural 2010 Games and they participated the first time at the Winter Youth Olympic Games on 2020 Games.

== Medal tables ==
=== Medals by Summer Games ===
Games	Athletes	Gold	Silver	Bronze	Total	Rank
2010 Singapore	5	0	0	1	1	84
(China) 2014 Nanjing	3	0	0	0	0	-
(Argentina) 2018 Buenos Aires	10	0	0	0	0	-
(Senegal) 2026 Dakar	did not participate					
Total		0	0	1	1	108

=== Medals by Winter Games ===
Games	Athletes	Gold	Silver	Bronze	Total	Rank
(Austria) 2012 Innsbruck	Did not participate					
(Norway) 2016 Lillehammer	Did not participate					
(Switzerland) 2020 Lausanne	1	0	0	0	0	-
(South Korea) 2024 Gangwon	Did not participate					
Total		0	0	0	0	-

=== Medals by summer sport ===
Sport	Gold	Silver	Bronze	Total
Boxing	0	0	1	1
Totals (1 entries)	0	0	1	1

== List of medalists ==
=== Summer Games ===
Medal	Name	Games	Sport	Event
Bronze	Nursähet Pazzyýew	2010 Singapore	Boxing	Boys' 69 kg

=== Summer Games medalists as part of Mixed-NOCs Team ===
Medal	Name	Games	Sport	Event
Silver	Jennet Geldybayeva	2010 Singapore	Judo	Mixed team
Silver	Milana Charygulyyeva	(Argentina) 2018 Buenos Aires	Judo	Mixed team

== Flag bearers ==
#	Games	Season	Flag bearer	Sport
4	2020 Lausanne	Winter	Nowruz Baýhanow	Ice hockey
3	2018 Buenos Aires	Summer	Annaguly Hojagulyyev	Basketball
2	2014 Nanjing	Summer	Muhammet Rozykulyyev	Wrestling
1	2010 Singapore	Summer	Nursähet Pazzyýew	Boxing

== See also ==
- Turkmenistan at the Olympics
- Turkmenistan at the Paralympics
