= Athletics at the 2026 Summer Youth Olympics – Women's 100 metre hurdles =

Athletics event at the IV Summer Youth Olympic Games

Women's 100 metres hurdles at the IV Summer Youth Olympic Games
- Youth Olympic Athletics
- Venue: Stade Iba Mar Diop
- Date: 8 October 2026
- Competitors: 16 from 16 nations

Medalists
1st place, gold medalist(s)		Zhang Keyi; China
2nd place, silver medalist(s)		Anna Peeters; France
3rd place, bronze medalist(s)		Shourya Ambure; India

The men's hammer throw competition at the 2026 Summer Youth Olympics will be held on 8 October, at the Stade Iba Mar Diop.

== Schedule ==
All times are in local time (UTC±0).

Date	Time	Round
Sunday, 8 November 2026	14:05	Semi-finals
Sunday, 8 November 2026	16:41	Final

== Results ==
=== Semi-finals ===
Qualification rule: First 4 in each heat (Q) and next 1 fastest (q) advance to Final.

Rank	Heat	Lane	Athlete	Nation	Result	Notes
1	1	8	Zhang Keyi	China	13.45	Q, SB
2	2	4	Anna Peeters	Nigeria	13.62	Q
3	2	7	Shourya Ambure	India	13.77	Q, PB
4	1	6	Fiona Schwarz	Austria	14.12	Q
5	2	5	Sara Ferreira	Portugal	14.19	Q
6	2	6	Wanda Arizala	Colombia	14.20	Q
7	2	3	Gisele Sanou	Burkina Faso	14.21	q, PB
8	1	5	Melissa Gonçalves	Brazil	14.22	Q
9	1	4	Janelle Kirkpatrick	South Africa	14.39	Q
10	1	3	Niginabonu Rajabova	Uzbekistan	15.03	
11	1	7	Kim Seo-hyun	South Korea	15.11	
12	2	8	Angelina Tupou	Tonga	16.33	
13	1	2	Alissar Saadellah	Algeria	17.45	SB
14	2	2	Fatimah Al-Azzawi	Iraq	18.75	PB
15	2	9	Taraji George	British Virgin Islands	20.07	PB
	1	9	Treasure Omosivwe	Nigeria		DNS

=== Final ===
The final was held on 8 November 2026.

Rank	Lane	Bib	Athlete	Nation	Result	Reaction time	Notes
1st place, gold medalist(s)	4	131	Zhang Keyi	China	13.17	0.157	PB
2nd place, silver medalist(s)	5	168	Anna Peeters	France	13.57	0.150	
3rd place, bronze medalist(s)	6	183	Shourya Ambure	India	13.59	0.142	PB
4	7	111	Fiona Schwarz	Austria	13.76	0.150	
5	1	244	Janelle Kirkpatrick	South Africa	13.78	0.172	
6	8	116	Melissa Gonçalves	Brazil	14.00	0.142	
7	3	236	Sara Ferreira	Portugal	14.10	0.160	
8	2	134	Wanda Arizala	Colombia	14.36	0.147	
9	9	120	Gisele Sanou	Burkina Faso	14.57	0.191	
