= Morocco at the Youth Olympics =

- IOC code: MAR
- NOC: Moroccan Olympic Committee; Arabic: اللجنة الأولمبية الوطنية المغربية
- Website: www.marocolympique.org (in French)
- Medals Ranked 60th: Gold 2 Silver 5 Bronze 3 Total 10

Summer appearances
- 2010; 2014; 2018

Winter appearances
- 2012; 2016; 2020; 2024

Morocco first participated at the Youth Olympic Games at the inaugural 2010 Games in Singapore. Morocco has sent a team to each Summer Youth Olympic Games and participated for the first and so far the only time at the Winter Youth Olympic Games in the 2012 edition held in Innsbruck. Moroccan athletes have won 9 medals at the Summer Youth Games and 1 at the Winter Youth Games, winning Africa's first ever medal at a Winter sport competition.

== Medal tables ==
=== Medals by Summer Youth Games ===
Games	Athletes	Gold	Silver	Bronze	Total	Rank
2010 Singapore	7	0	0	1	1	84
(China) 2014 Nanjing	15	0	0	1	1	80
(Argentina) 2018 Buenos Aires	20	1	5	1	7	42
Total		1	5	3	9	64

=== Medals by Winter Youth Games ===
Games	Athletes	Gold	Silver	Bronze	Total	Rank
(Austria) 2012 Innsbruck	1	1	0	0	1	19
(Norway) 2016 Lillehammer	Did not participate					
(Switzerland) 2020 Lausanne	Did not participate					
(South Korea) 2024 Gangwon	Did not participate					
Total		1	0	0	1	22

=== Medals by Summer Sports ===
Games	Gold	Silver	Bronze	Total
Taekwondo	1	1	0	2
Karate	0	2	1	3
Athletics	0	1	2	3
Boxing	0	1	0	1
Total	1	5	3	9

=== Medals by Winter Sports ===
Games	Gold	Silver	Bronze	Total
Alpine skiing	1	0	0	1
Total	1	0	0	1

== List of medalists ==
=== Summer Games ===
Medal	Name	Games	Sport	Event
Bronze	Hicham Sigueni	2010 Singapore	Athletics	Boys' 3000 metres
Bronze	Hicham Chemlal	(China) 2014 Nanjing	Athletics	Boys' 2000 metre steeplechase
Gold	Fatima-Ezzahra Aboufaras	(Argentina) 2018 Buenos Aires	Taekwondo	Girls' +63 kg
Silver	Yassine Elouarz	(Argentina) 2018 Buenos Aires	Boxing	Boys' Welterweight
Silver	Anass Essayi	(Argentina) 2018 Buenos Aires	Athletics	Boys' 1500 metres
Silver	Safia Salih	(Argentina) 2018 Buenos Aires	Taekwondo	Girls' 55 kg
Silver	Yassine Sekouri	(Argentina) 2018 Buenos Aires	Karate	Boys' 68 kg
Silver	Nabil Ech-Chaabi	(Argentina) 2018 Buenos Aires	Karate	Boys' +68 kg
Bronze	Oussama Edari	(Argentina) 2018 Buenos Aires	Karate	Boys' 61 kg

=== Winter Games ===
Medal	Name	Games	Sport	Event
Gold	Adam Lamhamedi	(Austria) 2012 Innsbruck	Alpine Skiing	Boys' super-G

== See also ==
- Morocco at the Olympics
- Morocco at the Paralympics
