= Russia at the Youth Olympics =

- IOC code: RUS
- NOC: Russian Olympic Committee
- Website: www.olympic.ru (in Russian)
- Medals Ranked 2nd: Gold 104 Silver 78 Bronze 60 Total 242

Summer appearances
- 2010; 2014; 2018; 2026

Winter appearances
- 2012; 2016; 2020; 2024

Russia has participated at the Youth Olympic Games in every edition since the inaugural 2010 Games and has earned medals from every edition.

== Bids ==
=== Unsuccessful Bids ===
Games	City	Winner of bid
2010 Summer Youth Olympics	Moscow	Singapore

== Medal tables ==
=== Medals by Summer Games ===
Games	Athletes	Gold	Silver	Bronze	Total	Rank
2010 Singapore	96	18	14	11	43	2
(China) 2014 Nanjing	84	27	19	11	57	2
(Argentina) 2018 Buenos Aires	93	29	18	12	59	1
(Senegal) 2026 Dakar	13	8	4	2	14	3
Total		82	55	36	173	2

=== Medals by Winter Games ===
Games	Athletes	Gold	Silver	Bronze	Total	Rank
(Austria) 2012 Innsbruck	67	5	4	7	16	5
(Norway) 2016 Lillehammer	72	7	8	9	24	3
(Switzerland) 2020 Lausanne	104	10	11	8	29	1
(South Korea) 2024 Gangwon	Did not participate (Note: In response to the Russian invasion of Ukraine since 2022, the International Olympic Committee decided to suspend Russian and Belarusian National Olympic Committees from participating in the Olympic Games, including the Youth Olympic Games. In theory, their athletes had rights for applying to participant at Gangwon 2024 under Individual Neutral Athletes identity if the required neutral conditions are met, but in 4 January 2024, it was confirmed that no such neutral athletes had applied.)					
Total		22	23	24	69	1

=== Medals by summer sport ===
Leading in that sport

Sport	Gold	Silver	Bronze	Total
Swimming	25	14	7	46
Gymnastics	16	5	7	28
Wrestling	9	1	3	13
Athletics	6	4	4	14
Taekwondo	5	3	3	11
Fencing	4	1	1	6
Weightlifting	3	5	0	8
Boxing	3	2	1	6
Judo	2	4	1	7
Cycling	2	1	1	4
Beach volleyball	2	0	0	2
Tennis	1	3	1	5
Modern pentathlon	1	2	0	3
Shooting	1	2	0	3
Canoeing	1	0	1	2
Breaking	1	0	0	1
Sailing	0	2	1	3
Handball	0	2	0	2
Diving	0	1	2	3
Basketball	0	1	0	1
Futsal	0	1	0	1
Karate	0	1	0	1
Archery	0	0	2	2
Volleyball	0	0	1	1
Totals (24 entries)	82	55	36	173

=== Medals by winter sport ===
Leading in that sport

Sport	Gold	Silver	Bronze	Total
Figure skating	7	7	8	22
Biathlon	4	4	4	12
Cross-country skiing	4	1	2	7
Skeleton	2	0	0	2
Luge	1	2	3	6
Freestyle skiing	1	1	2	4
Ice hockey	1	1	1	3
Mixed	1	1	0	2
Ski jumping	1	1	0	2
Snowboarding	0	2	0	2
Speed skating	0	1	2	3
Alpine skiing	0	1	1	2
Bobsleigh	0	1	0	1
Curling	0	0	1	1
Totals (14 entries)	22	23	24	69

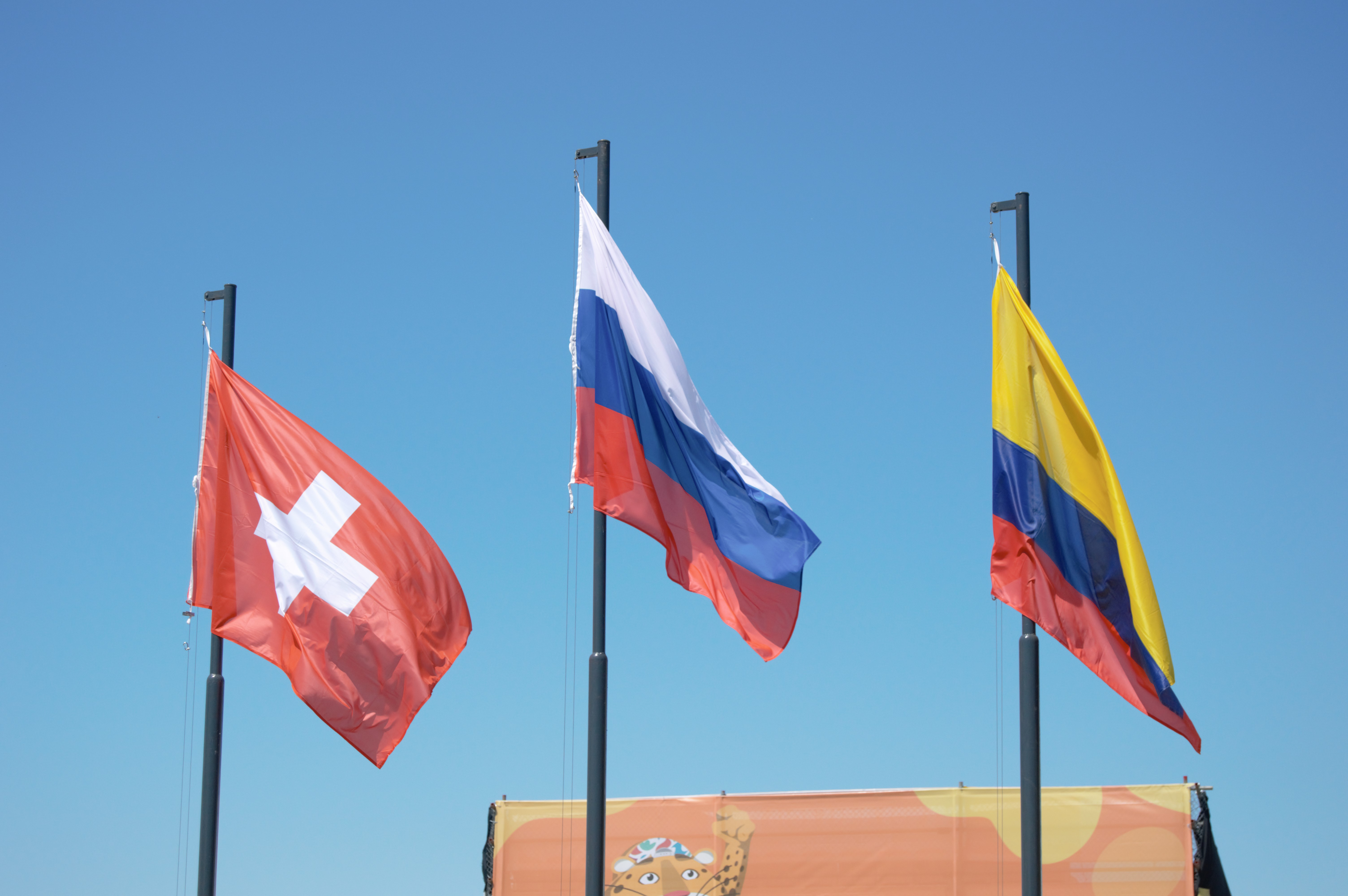
Russian flag being hoisted after victory at the Mixed BMX Racing event in Buenos Aires 2018.

== Flag bearers ==
#	Games	Season	Flag bearer	Sport
1	2010 Singapore	Summer	Igor Kalashnikov	Canoeing
2	2012 Innsbruck	Winter	Sergey Mozgov	Figure skating
3	2014 Nanjing	Summer	Anatoliy Ryapolov	Athletics
4	2016 Lillehammer	Winter	Sofia Tikhonova	Ski jumping
5	2018 Buenos Aires	Summer	Kliment Kolesnikov	Swimming
6	2020 Lausanne	Winter	Evgeniia Dolzhenkova	Ski mountaineering
7	2026 Dakar	Summer	Bogdan Toropkin; Serafima Fokina	Swimming

== See also ==
- Russia at the Olympics
- Russia at the Paralympics
