= Ice hockey at the Winter Youth Olympics =

- Governing body: IIHF
- Events: 4 (men: 2; womens: 2)

Games
- 2012; 2016; 2020; 2024

Ice hockey was introduced at the Youth Olympic Games at the inaugural edition in 2012 for both boys and girls. For the 2012 and 2016 editions a 5-on-5 team competition and an individual skills challenge were open to both genders. In 2020, the skills challenge was replaced by a mixed-NOC 3-on-3 tournament. In 2024 the mixed-NOC 3-on-3 tournament was replaced by a 3-on-3 tournament format for the 12th through 28th ranked NOCs.

== Boys ==
=== Tournament ===
Year	Host	Gold medal game			Bronze medal game			Teams
Year	Host	Gold medalist	Score	Silver medalist	Bronze medalist	Score	Fourth place	Teams
2012; Details	Innsbruck	Finland	2 – 1 (SO)	Russia	Canada	7 – 5	United States	5
2016; Details	Lillehammer	United States	5 – 2	Canada	Russia	6 – 2	Finland	5
2020; Details	Lausanne	Russia	4 – 0	United States	Canada	4 – 2	Finland	6
2024; Details	Gangwon	United States	4 – 0	Czech Republic	Finland	5 – 4	Canada	6

=== 3-on-3 cross ice tournament ===
Games	Gold	Silver	Bronze
2020 Lausanne details	Team Green (MIX); Nicolas Elgas (LUX); Artyom Pronichkin (RUS); Nathan Nicoud (FRA); Volodymyr Troshkin (UKR); Pablo González (ESP); Maks Perčič (SLO); Yam Yau (HKG); Alessandro Segafredo (ITA); Marek Potšinok (EST); Patrik Dalen (NOR); Ilya Korzun (BLR); Levente Hegedűs (HUN); Štěpán Maleček (CZE)	Team Red (MIX); Juho Lukkari (FIN); Denis Pasko (UKR); Lin Wei-yu (TPE); Aleks Menc (POL); Matija Dinić (SRB); Peter Repčík (SVK); Mackenzie Stewart (GBR); Dylan Wesseling (NED); Tjaš Lesničar (SLO); Sander Salvær (NOR); Jan Hornecker (SUI); Matthias Bittner (GER); Maël Halladj (FRA)	Team Brown (MIX); Luka Banek (CRO); Sai Lake (AUS); Hugo Galvez (FRA); Elvis Hsu (HKG); Axel Ruski-Jones (NZL); Marlon D'Acunto (GER); Erik Potšinok (EST); Evan Nauth (GBR); Artur Seniut (LTU); Matyáš Šapovaliv (CZE); Milán Ivády (HUN); Rastislav Eliáš (SVK); Sebastian Aarsund (NOR)

=== Individual skills challenge ===
Games	Gold	Silver	Bronze
2012 Innsbruck details	Augusts Vasiļonoks; Latvia	Attila Kovács; Hungary	Seiya Furukawa; Japan
2016 Lillehammer details	Eduard Casaneanu; Romania	Sebastián Čederle; Slovakia	Erik Betzold; Germany Aleks Haatanen; Finland

== Girls ==
=== Tournament ===
Year	Host	Gold medal game			Bronze medal game			Teams
Year	Host	Gold medalist	Score	Silver medalist	Bronze medalist	Score	Fourth place	Teams
2012; Details	Innsbruck	Sweden	3 – 0	Austria	Germany	7 – 4	Kazakhstan	5
2016; Details	Lillehammer	Sweden	3 – 1	Czech Republic	Switzerland	5 – 2	Slovakia	5
2020; Details	Lausanne	Japan	4 – 1	Sweden	Slovakia	2 – 1	Switzerland	6
2024; Details	Gangwon	Sweden	4 – 0	Japan	Germany	3 – 1	Switzerland	6

=== 3-on-3 cross ice tournament ===
Games	Gold	Silver	Bronze
2020 Lausanne details	Team Yellow (MIX); Anke Steeno (BEL); Eva Aizpurua (ESP); Ludmilla Bourcet (FRA); Elisa Innocenti (ITA); Katya Blong (NZL); Iris van Houten (NED); Zuzana Trnková (CZE); Luisa Wilson (MEX); Shin Seo-yoon (KOR); Leonie Böttcher (GER); Nora Pollestad (NOR); Nubya Aeschlimann (SUI); Magdalena Luggin (AUT)	Team Black (MIX); Angelina Hurschler (SUI); Courtney Mahoney (AUS); Zhang Xinyue (CHN); Chang En-ni (TPE); Alicja Mota (POL); Nikola Janeková (SVK); Amy Robery (GBR); Daria Petrova (RUS); Kimberly Collard (NED); Luca Márton (HUN); Reina Sato (JPN); Emilia Kyrkkö (FIN); Carlotta Regine (ITA)	Team Blue (MIX); Sidre Özer (TUR); Valerie Christmann (SUI); Anna Kot (POL); Maria Runevska (BUL); Mirren Foy (GBR); Zuzana Dobiašová (SVK); Yana Krasheninina (RUS); Maya Stober (GER); Regina Metzler (HUN); Karolina Hengelmüller (AUT); Nikki Sharp (AUS); Yuna Kusama (JPN); Aya Juhl Petersen (DEN)

=== Individual skills challenge ===
Games	Gold	Silver	Bronze
2012 Innsbruck details	Julie Zwarthoed (NED)	Fanni Gasparics (HUN)	Sharnita Crompton (AUS)
2016 Lillehammer details	Sena Takanaka (JPN)	Anita Muraro (ITA)	Theresa Schafzahl (AUT)

== Medal table ==
As of the 2024 Winter Youth Olympics.

Rank	Nation	Gold	Silver	Bronze	Total
1	Sweden	3	1	0	4
2	Japan	2	1	1	4
3	United States	2	1	0	3
4	Russia	1	1	1	3
5	Finland	1	0	2	3
6	Latvia	1	0	0	1
6	Netherlands	1	0	0	1
6	Romania	1	0	0	1
9	Czech Republic	0	2	0	2
9	Hungary	0	2	0	2
11	Canada	0	1	2	3
12	Austria	0	1	1	2
12	Slovakia	0	1	1	2
14	Italy	0	1	0	1
15	Germany	0	0	3	3
16	Australia	0	0	1	1
16	Switzerland	0	0	1	1
Totals (17 entries)		12	12	13	37

== See also ==
- Ice hockey at the Olympic Games
