= Belarus at the Youth Olympics =

Performance of Belarus at the Youth Olympic Games

- IOC code: BLR
- NOC: Belarus Olympic Committee
- Website: www.noc.by/en (in English)
- Medals Ranked 40th: Gold 5 Silver 11 Bronze 5 Total 21

Summer appearances
- 2010; 2014; 2018

Winter appearances
- 2012; 2016; 2020; 2024

Belarus has participated at the Youth Olympic Games in every edition since the inaugural 2010 Games.

== Medal tables ==
=== Medals by Summer Games ===
Games	Athletes	Gold	Silver	Bronze	Total	Rank
2010 Singapore	49	0	4	1	5	59
(China) 2014 Nanjing	35	4	3	0	7	15
(Argentina) 2018 Buenos Aires	37	1	3	3	7	47
(Senegal) 2026 Dakar						
Total (3/3)	121	5	10	4	19	33

=== Medals by Winter Games ===
Games	Athletes	Gold	Silver	Bronze	Total	Rank
(Austria) 2012 Innsbruck	16	0	1	0	1	24
(Norway) 2016 Lillehammer	16	0	0	0	0	-
(Switzerland) 2020 Lausanne	19	0	0	1	1	29
(South Korea) 2024 Gangwon	Did not participate, either as national or neutral (Note: In response to the Russian invasion of Ukraine since 2022, the International Olympic Committee decided to ban Belarusian and Russian National Olympic Committees from participating future Olympic Games, include Youth Olympic Games. In theory, their athletes may apply for participating Gangwon 2024 under Individual Neutral Athletes identity if the required neutral conditions are met, but in 4 January 2024, it has been confirmed that no such neutral athletes are applied.)					
Total (3/4)	51	0	1	1	2	32

=== Medals by summer sport ===
Sport	Gold	Silver	Bronze	Total
Canoeing	2	0	0	2
Athletics	1	3	1	5
Rowing	1	1	0	2
Judo	1	0	1	2
Gymnastics	0	3	0	3
Swimming	0	1	1	2
Shooting	0	1	0	1
Tennis	0	1	0	1
Wrestling	0	0	1	1
Totals (9 entries)	5	10	4	19

=== Medals by winter sport ===
Sport	Gold	Silver	Bronze	Total
Speed skating	0	1	0	1
Biathlon	0	0	1	1
Totals (2 entries)	0	1	1	2

== List of medalists ==
=== Summer Games ===
Medal	Name	Games	Sport	Event
Silver	Sviatlana Makshtarova	2010 Singapore	Gymnastics	Girls' trampoline
Silver	Illia Charheika	2010 Singapore	Shooting	Boys' 10 m air rifle
Silver	Alena Navahrodskaya	2010 Singapore	Athletics	Girls' hammer throw
Silver	Arina Charopa	2010 Singapore	Gymnastics	Girls' rhythmic all-around
Bronze	Vita Valnova	2010 Singapore	Judo	Girls' -44 kg
Gold	Krystsina Staraselets	(China) 2014 Nanjing	Rowing	Girls' single sculls
Gold	Stanislau Daineka	(China) 2014 Nanjing	Canoeing	Boys' K1 sprint
Gold	Kamila Bobr	(China) 2014 Nanjing	Canoeing	Girls' C1 sprint
Gold	Hanna Tarasiuk	(China) 2014 Nanjing	Athletics	Girls' javelin throw
Silver	Elvira Herman	(China) 2014 Nanjing	Athletics	Girls' 100 m hurdles
Silver	Iryna Shymanovich	(China) 2014 Nanjing	Tennis	Girls' singles
Silver	Mariya Trubach	(China) 2014 Nanjing	Gymnastics	Girls' rhythmic all-around
Gold	Artsiom Kolasau	(Argentina) 2018 Buenos Aires	Judo	Boys' -55 kg
Silver	Ivan Brynza	(Argentina) 2018 Buenos Aires	Rowing	Boys' single sculls
Silver	Anastasiya Shkurdai	(Argentina) 2018 Buenos Aires	Swimming	Girls' 50 m butterfly
Silver	Yelizaveta Dorts	(Argentina) 2018 Buenos Aires	Athletics	Girls' shot put
Bronze	Anastasiya Shkurdai	(Argentina) 2018 Buenos Aires	Swimming	Girls' 100 m butterfly
Bronze	Natallia Varakina	(Argentina) 2018 Buenos Aires	Wrestling	Girls' Freestyle -49 kg
Bronze	Krystsina Kantsavenka	(Argentina) 2018 Buenos Aires	Athletics	Girls' pole vault

=== Summer Games medalists as part of Mixed-NOCs Team ===
Medal	Name	Games	Sport	Event
Gold	Anton Karoukin	2010 Singapore	Archery	Mixed team
Gold	Iryna Shymanovich	(China) 2014 Nanjing	Tennis	Girls' doubles
Silver	Dzmitry Minkou	(China) 2014 Nanjing	Judo	Mixed team
Gold	Artsiom Kolasau	(Argentina) 2018 Buenos Aires	Judo	Mixed team
Bronze	Viktoryia Akhotnikava; Ilya Famenkou	(Argentina) 2018 Buenos Aires	Gymnastics	Mixed multi-discipline team

=== Winter Games ===
Medal	Name	Games	Sport	Event
Silver	Roman Dubovik	(Austria) 2012 Innsbruck	Speed skating	Boys' 500 m
Bronze	Yuliya Kavaleuskaya	(Switzerland) 2020 Lausanne	Biathlon	Girls' individual

=== Winter Games medalists as part of Mixed-NOCs Team ===
Medal	Name	Games	Sport	Event
Gold	Eugenia Tkachenka; Yuri Hulitski	(Austria) 2012 Innsbruck	Figure skating	Mixed team
Gold	Ilya Korzun	(Switzerland) 2020 Lausanne	Ice hockey	Boys' 3x3 mixed tournament

== Flag bearers ==
#	Games	Season	Flag bearer	Sport
6	2020 Lausanne	Winter	Danil Karpovich	Ice hockey
5	2018 Buenos Aires	Summer	Ivan Brynza	Rowing
4	2016 Lillehammer	Winter		
3	2014 Nanjing	Summer	Hanna Tarasiuk	Athletics
2	2012 Innsbruck	Winter	Anastasiya Lesik	Alpine skiing
1	2010 Singapore	Summer	Aliaksandr Venskel	Weightlifting

== See also ==
- Belarus at the Olympics
- Belarus at the Paralympics
