= Austria at the Youth Olympics =

Performance of Austria at the Youth Olympic Games

- IOC code: AUT
- NOC: Austrian Olympic Committee
- Website: www.olympia.at (in German)
- Medals Ranked 11th: Gold 22 Silver 16 Bronze 29 Total 67

Summer appearances
- 2010; 2014; 2018

Winter appearances
- 2012; 2016; 2020; 2024

Austria has participated at the Youth Olympic Games in every edition since the inaugural 2010 Games and has earned gold medals from every edition.

== Hosted Games ==
Austria has hosted the Games on one occasion.

| Games | Host city | Dates | Nations | Participants | Events |
|---|---|---|---|---|---|
| 2012 Winter Youth Olympics | Innsbruck | 13 January – 22 January | 69 | 1,059 | 63 |

== Medal tables ==
*Red border color indicates tournament was held on home soil.

=== Medals by Summer Games ===
| Games | Athletes | Gold | Silver | Bronze | Total | Rank |
|---|---|---|---|---|---|---|
| 2010 Singapore | 16 | 1 | 0 | 3 | 4 | 46 |
| (China) 2014 Nanjing | 33 | 1 | 0 | 1 | 2 | 47 |
| (Argentina) 2018 Buenos Aires | 41 | 1 | 1 | 7 | 9 | 51 |
| (Senegal) 2026 Dakar | | | | | | |
| Total | | 3 | 1 | 11 | 15 | 52 |

=== Medals by Winter Games ===
| Games | Athletes | Gold | Silver | Bronze | Total | Rank |
|---|---|---|---|---|---|---|
| (Austria) 2012 Innsbruck | 81 | 6 | 4 | 3 | 13 | 3 |
| (Norway) 2016 Lillehammer | 35 | 2 | 3 | 5 | 10 | 12 |
| (Switzerland) 2020 Lausanne | 63 | 6 | 2 | 5 | 13 | 5 |
| (South Korea) 2024 Gangwon | 61 | 5 | 6 | 5 | 16 | 7 |
| Total | | 19 | 15 | 18 | 52 | 6 |

=== Medals by summer sport ===
| Sport | Gold | Silver | Bronze | Total |
|---|---|---|---|---|
| Canoeing | 1 | 0 | 1 | 2 |
| Sport climbing | 1 | 0 | 1 | 2 |
| Sailing | 1 | 0 | 0 | 1 |
| Cycling | 0 | 1 | 0 | 1 |
| Judo | 0 | 0 | 3 | 3 |
| Swimming | 0 | 0 | 2 | 2 |
| Athletics | 0 | 0 | 1 | 1 |
| Golf | 0 | 0 | 1 | 1 |
| Gymnastics | 0 | 0 | 1 | 1 |
| Triathlon | 0 | 0 | 1 | 1 |
| Totals (10 entries) | 3 | 1 | 11 | 15 |

=== Medals by winter sport ===
| Sport | Gold | Silver | Bronze | Total |
|---|---|---|---|---|
| Alpine skiing | 7 | 2 | 5 | 14 |
| Nordic combined | 2 | 1 | 0 | 3 |
| Ski jumping | 2 | 0 | 2 | 4 |
| Freestyle skiing | 2 | 0 | 1 | 3 |
| Luge | 1 | 0 | 2 | 3 |
| Bobsleigh | 0 | 2 | 0 | 2 |
| Skeleton | 0 | 2 | 0 | 2 |
| Biathlon | 0 | 1 | 1 | 2 |
| Ice hockey | 0 | 1 | 1 | 2 |
| Ski mountaineering | 0 | 0 | 1 | 1 |
| Totals (10 entries) | 14 | 9 | 13 | 36 |

== List of medalists ==
=== Summer Games ===
| Medal | Name | Games | Sport | Event |
|---|---|---|---|---|
| Gold | Lara Vadlau | 2010 Singapore | Sailing | Girls' Byte CII |
| Bronze | Alois Knabl | 2010 Singapore | Triathlon | Boys' individual |
| Bronze | Christine Huck | 2010 Singapore | Judo | Girls' -52 kg |
| Bronze | Viktoria Wolffhardt | 2010 Singapore | Canoeing | Girls' K1 slalom |
| Gold | Nadine Weratschnig | (China) 2014 Nanjing | Canoeing | Girls' C1 slalom |
| Bronze | Michaela Polleres | (China) 2014 Nanjing | Judo | Girls' -63 kg |
| Gold | Sandra Lettner | (Argentina) 2018 Buenos Aires | Sport climbing | Girls' combined |
| Silver | Laura Stigger; Hannah Streicher | (Argentina) 2018 Buenos Aires | Cycling | Girls' combined team |
| Bronze | Daniel Leutgeb | (Argentina) 2018 Buenos Aires | Judo | Boys' -55 kg |
| Bronze | Laura Lammer | (Argentina) 2018 Buenos Aires | Sport climbing | Girls' combined |
| Bronze | Marlene Kahler | (Argentina) 2018 Buenos Aires | Swimming | Girls' 800 m freestyle |
| Bronze | Emma Spitz | (Argentina) 2018 Buenos Aires | Golf | Girls' individual |
| Bronze | Marlene Kahler | (Argentina) 2018 Buenos Aires | Swimming | Girls' 400 m freestyle |
| Bronze | Ingeborg Grünwald | (Argentina) 2018 Buenos Aires | Athletics | Girls' long jump |
| Bronze | Benny Wizani | (Argentina) 2018 Buenos Aires | Gymnastics | Boys' trampoline |

=== Summer Games medalists as part of Mixed-NOCs Team ===
| Medal | Name | Games | Sport | Event |
|---|---|---|---|---|
| Gold | Alois Knabl | 2010 Singapore | Triathlon | Mixed relay |
| Bronze | Christine Huck | 2010 Singapore | Judo | Mixed team |
| Bronze | Marko Bubanja | (China) 2014 Nanjing | Judo | Mixed team |
| Bronze | Daniel Leutgeb | (Argentina) 2018 Buenos Aires | Judo | Mixed team |
| Bronze | Anna Thurner | (Argentina) 2018 Buenos Aires | Dancesport | Mixed team |

=== Winter Games ===
| Medal | Name | Games | Sport | Event |
|---|---|---|---|---|
| Gold | Marco Schwarz | (Austria) 2012 Innsbruck | Alpine skiing | Boys' combined |
| Gold | Elisabeth Gram | (Austria) 2012 Innsbruck | Freestyle skiing | Girls' halfpipe |
| Gold | Miriam-Stefanie Kastlunger | (Austria) 2012 Innsbruck | Luge | Girls' singles |
| Gold | Martina Rettenwender; Marco Schwarz; Christine Ager; Mathias Graf | (Austria) 2012 Innsbruck | Alpine skiing | Parallel mixed team |
| Gold | Marco Schwarz | (Austria) 2012 Innsbruck | Alpine skiing | Boys' giant slalom |
| Gold | Michaela Heider | (Austria) 2012 Innsbruck | Freestyle skiing | Girls' ski cross |
| Silver | Stefan Geisler | (Austria) 2012 Innsbruck | Skeleton | Boys' individual |
| Silver | Carina Mair | (Austria) 2012 Innsbruck | Skeleton | Girls' individual |
| Silver | Benjamin Maier; Robert Ofensberger | (Austria) 2012 Innsbruck | Bobsleigh | Two-boys |
| Silver | Nicole Arnberger; Julia Frick; Tamara Grascher; Alexandra Gürtler; Victoria Hummel; Anna Katharina Iberer; Martina Kneß; Anja List; Paula Camilla Marchart; Anna Meixner; Anna Meixner; Julia Pechmann; Paulina Polczik; Noemi Prosenz; Anna Schmid; Luisa Steiner; Julia Willenshofer | (Austria) 2012 Innsbruck | Ice hockey | Girls' tournament |
| Bronze | Christine Ager | (Austria) 2012 Innsbruck | Alpine skiing | Girls' super-G |
| Bronze | Miriam-Stefanie Kastlunger; Armin Frauscher; Thomas Steu; Lorenz Koller | (Austria) 2012 Innsbruck | Luge | Mixed team relay |
| Bronze | Mathias Graf | (Austria) 2012 Innsbruck | Alpine skiing | Boys' slalom |
| Gold | Nadine Fest | (Norway) 2016 Lillehammer | Alpine skiing | Girls' super-G |
| Gold | Manuel Traninger | (Norway) 2016 Lillehammer | Alpine skiing | Boys' slalom |
| Silver | Julia Scheib | (Norway) 2016 Lillehammer | Alpine skiing | Girls' super-G |
| Silver | Manuel Traninger | (Norway) 2016 Lillehammer | Alpine skiing | Boys' combined |
| Silver | Mercedes Schulte | (Norway) 2016 Lillehammer | Bobsleigh | Girls' monobob |
| Bronze | Manuel Traninger | (Norway) 2016 Lillehammer | Alpine skiing | Boys' super-G |
| Bronze | Lara Wolf | (Norway) 2016 Lillehammer | Freestyle skiing | Girls' halfpipe |
| Bronze | Madeleine Egle | (Norway) 2016 Lillehammer | Luge | Girls' singles |
| Bronze | Theresa Schafzahl | (Norway) 2016 Lillehammer | Ice hockey | Girls' individual skills challenge |
| Bronze | Julia Huber; Florian Dagn; Clemens Leitner | (Norway) 2016 Lillehammer | Ski jumping | Team competition |
| Gold | Amanda Salzgeber | (Switzerland) 2020 Lausanne | Alpine skiing | Girls' combined |
| Gold | Philip Hoffmann | (Switzerland) 2020 Lausanne | Alpine skiing | Boys' giant slalom |
| Gold | Lisa Hirner | (Switzerland) 2020 Lausanne | Nordic combined | Girls' individual normal hill/4 km |
| Gold | Stefan Rettenegger | (Switzerland) 2020 Lausanne | Nordic combined | Boys' individual normal hill/6 km |
| Gold | Marco Wörgötter | (Switzerland) 2020 Lausanne | Ski jumping | Boys' individual normal hill |
| Gold | Lisa Hirner; Stefan Rettenegger; Julia Mühlbacher; Marco Wörgötter | (Switzerland) 2020 Lausanne | Ski jumping | Mixed team normal hill |
| Silver | Lukas Haslinger | (Switzerland) 2020 Lausanne | Biathlon | Boys' individual |
| Silver | Johanna Bassani; Severin Reiter; Vanessa Moharitsch; David Haagen; Witta-Luisa Walcher; Erik Engel | (Switzerland) 2020 Lausanne | Nordic combined | Nordic mixed team normal hill/4 × 3.3 km |
| Bronze | Nils Oberauer | (Switzerland) 2020 Lausanne | Ski mountaineering | Boys' individual |
| Bronze | Amanda Salzgeber | (Switzerland) 2020 Lausanne | Alpine skiing | Girls' giant slalom |
| Bronze | Anna Andexer | (Switzerland) 2020 Lausanne | Biathlon | Girls' sprint |
| Bronze | Amanda Salzgeber; Philip Hoffmann | (Switzerland) 2020 Lausanne | Alpine skiing | Parallel mixed team |
| Bronze | David Haagen | (Switzerland) 2020 Lausanne | Ski jumping | Boys' individual normal hill |

=== Winter Games medalists as part of Mixed-NOCs Team ===
| Medal | Name | Games | Sport | Event |
|---|---|---|---|---|
| Bronze | Melanie Brantner | (Austria) 2012 Innsbruck | Short track | Mixed team relay |
| Gold | Ignaz Gschwentner | (Switzerland) 2020 Lausanne | Speed skating | Mixed team sprint |
| Gold | Magdalena Luggin | (Switzerland) 2020 Lausanne | Ice hockey | Girls' 3x3 mixed tournament |
| Bronze | Karolina Hengelmüller | (Switzerland) 2020 Lausanne | Ice hockey | Girls' 3x3 mixed tournament |

== Flag bearers ==
| # | Games | Season | Flag bearer | Sport |
|---|---|---|---|---|
| 6 | 2020 Lausanne | Winter | Amanda Salzgeber | Alpine skiing |
| 5 | 2018 Buenos Aires | Summer | Laura Stigger | Cycling |
| 4 | 2016 Lillehammer | Winter | Marco Ladner | Freestyle skiing |
| 3 | 2014 Nanjing | Summer | Dominik Hufnagl | Athletics |
| 2 | 2012 Innsbruck | Winter | Tamara Grascher | Ice hockey |
| 1 | 2010 Singapore | Summer | Lara Vadlau | Sailing |

== See also ==
- Austria at the Olympics
- Austria at the Paralympics
