= 3x3 basketball at the Summer Youth Olympics =

- Events: 6 (men: 3; women: 3)

Games
- 2010; 2014; 2018; 2026

Basketball was inducted at the Youth Olympic Games at the inaugural edition in 2010 for both boys and girls. The tournaments use the FIBA 3x3 rules. The program also includes skill challenge.

== Boys ==
=== Summaries ===
Year	Host	Gold medal game			Bronze medal game		
Year	Host	Gold medalist	Score	Silver medalist	Bronze medalist	Score	Fourth place
2010; Details	Singapore	Serbia	22–9	Croatia	Greece	34–25	United States
2014; Details	(China) Nanjing	Lithuania	18–16	France	Argentina	17–14	Russia
2018; Details	(Argentina) Buenos Aires	Argentina	20–15	Belgium	Slovenia	21–13	Ukraine
2026; Details	(Senegal) Dakar	Senegal	14–13	Lithuania	Germany	21–17	Latvia

=== Team appearances ===
Team	(Singapore) 2010	(China) 2014	(Argentina) 2018	(Senegal) 2026
Algeria	-	-	-	10th
Andorra	-	17th	19th	-
Argentina	7th	3rd	1st	5th
Belgium	-	-	2nd	-
Brazil	-	7th	7th	-
Central African Republic	15th	-	-	-
China	-	12th	12th	-
Croatia	2nd	-	-	-
Egypt	13th	-	-	-
Estonia	-	-	9th	-
France	-	2nd	-	-
Georgia	-	-	8th	-
Germany	-	18th	-	3rd
Greece	3rd	-	-	-
Guatemala	-	20th	-	-
Hungary	-	14th	-	-
India	18th	-	-	-
Indonesia	-	19th	-	-
Iran	11th	-	-	-
Israel	6th	-	-	-
Italy	-	-	5th	-
Ivory Coast	-	-	-	6th
Jordan	-	-	20th	-
Kazakhstan	-	-	15th	-
Kyrgyzstan	-	-	18th	-
Latvia	-	-	12th	4th
Lithuania	5th	1st	-	2nd
Mongolia	-	-	17th	8th
New Zealand	14th	11th	11th	-
Panama	20th	-	-	-
Philippines	9th	-	-	-
Poland	-	5th	-	-
Puerto Rico	10th	13th	-	7th
Romania	-	8th	-	-
Russia	-	4th	6th	-
Serbia	1st	-	-	-
Senegal	-	-	-	1st
Singapore	17th	-	-	11th
Slovenia	-	9th	3rd	-
Solomon Islands	-	-	-	12th
South Africa	19th	-	-	-
Spain	8th	10th	-	-
Tunisia	-	15th	-	-
Turkey	12th	-	-	-
Turkmenistan	-	-	16th	-
Ukraine	-	-	4th	-
United States	4th	-	13th	-
Uruguay	-	16th	-	-
Venezuela	-	6th	14th	9th
U.S. Virgin Islands	16th	-	-	-

=== Dunk contest ===
Games	Gold	Silver	Bronze
2014 Nanjing	Karim Mouliom; France	Žiga Lah; Slovenia	Fu Lei; China
2018 Buenos Aires	Fausto Ruesga; Argentina	Nikita Remizov; Russia	Niccolò Filoni; Italy

== Girls ==
=== Summaries ===
Year	Host	Gold medal game			Bronze medal game		
Year	Host	Gold medalist	Score	Silver medalist	Bronze medalist	Score	Fourth place
2010; Details	Singapore	China	33–29	Australia	United States	34–25	Canada
2014; Details	(China) Nanjing	United States	19–10	Netherlands	Spain	12–11	Hungary
2018; Details	(Argentina) Buenos Aires	United States	18–4	France	Australia	16–13	China
2026; Details	(Senegal) Dakar	Poland	12–11	China	Senegal	18–17	Egypt

=== Team appearances ===
Team	(Singapore) 2010	(China) 2014	(Argentina) 2018	(Senegal) 2026
Andorra	-	18th	20th	-
Angola	16th	-	-	-
Argentina	-	-	5th	-
Australia	2nd	-	3rd	-
Belarus	12th	-	-	-
Belgium	-	5th	-	-
Brazil	6th	14th	-	-
Canada	4th	-	-	-
Chile	18th	-	-	6th
China	1st	7th	4th	2nd
Czech Republic	13th	10th	16th	8th
Egypt	-	13th	18th	4th
Estonia	-	6th	14th	-
Fiji	-	-	-	12th
France	10th	-	2nd	9th
Germany	8th	8th	11th	-
Guam	-	16th	-	-
Hungary	-	4th	6th	-
Indonesia	-	20th	15th	-
Iran	-	-	19th	-
Italy	9th	-	-	-
Ivory Coast	15th	-	-	-
Japan	5th	-	-	-
Kenya	-	-	-	7th
Mali	14th	-	-	-
Mexico	-	-	9th	10th
Netherlands	-	2nd	8th	-
Poland	-	-	-	1st
Romania	-	12th	12th	-
Russia	11th	-	-	-
Senegal		-	-	3rd
Singapore	19th	-	-	-
Slovenia	-	17th	-	-
South Korea	7th	-	-	-
Spain	-	3rd	10th	-
Sri Lanka	-	-	17th	-
Syria	-	19th	-	-
Chinese Taipei	-	11th	-	5th
Thailand	17th	9th	-	-
Ukraine	-	-	7th	11th
United States	3rd	1st	1st	-
Vanuatu	20th	-	-	-
Venezuela	-	15th	13th	-

=== Shoot-out contest ===
Games	Gold	Silver	Bronze
2014 Nanjing	Lucía Togores; Spain	Ela Mićunović; Slovenia	Katie Lou Samuelson; United States
2018 Buenos Aires	Mathilde Peyregne; France	Kateřina Galíčková; Czech Republic	Sofía Acevedo; Argentina

=== Medal table ===
As of the 2026 Summer Youth Olympics.

Rank	Nation	Gold	Silver	Bronze	Total
1	United States	2	0	2	4
2	China	1	1	0	2
2	France	1	1	0	2
4	Spain	1	0	1	2
5	Poland	1	0	0	1
6	Australia	0	1	1	2
7	Czech Republic	0	1	0	1
7	Netherlands	0	1	0	1
7	Slovenia	0	1	0	1
10	Argentina	0	0	1	1
10	Senegal	0	0	1	1
Totals (11 entries)		6	6	6	18

== Medal table ==
As of the 2026 Summer Youth Olympics.

Rank	Nation	Gold	Silver	Bronze	Total
1	France	2	2	0	4
2	Argentina	2	0	2	4
2	United States	2	0	2	4
4	China	1	1	1	3
5	Lithuania	1	1	0	2
6	Senegal	1	0	1	2
6	Spain	1	0	1	2
8	Poland	1	0	0	1
8	Serbia	1	0	0	1
10	Slovenia	0	2	1	3
11	Australia	0	1	1	2
12	Belgium	0	1	0	1
12	Croatia	0	1	0	1
12	Czech Republic	0	1	0	1
12	Netherlands	0	1	0	1
12	Russia	0	1	0	1
17	Germany	0	0	1	1
17	Greece	0	0	1	1
17	Italy	0	0	1	1
Totals (19 entries)		12	12	12	36

== See also ==
- Basketball at the Summer Olympics
