= Brazil at the Youth Olympics =

- IOC code: BRA
- NOC: Brazilian Olympic Committee
- Website: www.cob.org.br (in Portuguese)
- Medals Ranked 21st: Gold 13 Silver 16 Bronze 11 Total 40

Summer appearances
- 2010; 2014; 2018; 2026

Winter appearances
- 2012; 2016; 2020; 2024

Brazil has participated at every edition of the Youth Olympic Games since the inaugural summer edition in 2010. As of 2020 Brazil is ranked 17th on the Summer Games all-time medal table and the country has a bronze medal at the Winter Youth Olympics.

== Medalists ==
=== Summer Youth Olympic Games ===
Medal	Name	Year	Sport	Event
Gold	Caio Cezar dos Santos	2010 Singapore	Athletics	Boys' long jump
Gold	David Lourenço	2010 Singapore	Boxing	Boys' 69kg
Silver	Thiago Braz	2010 Singapore	Athletics	Boys' pole vault
Silver	Felipe Wu	2010 Singapore	Shooting	Boys' 10 m air pistol
Silver	Flávia Gomes	2010 Singapore	Judo	Girls' −63kg
Bronze	Girls' national team: Lais da Silva; Thayanne Lopes; Francielle da Rocha; Keila Alves; Juliana de Araujo; Fernanda Marques; Patricia Batista da Silva; Larissa Araujo; Isadora Garcia; Deborah Nunes; Ana Eduarda Vieira; Caroline Martins; Mirian Galvão; Daise Souza	2010 Singapore	Handball	Girls' team
Gold	Edival Pontes	2014 Nanjing	Taekwondo	Boys' −63kg
Gold	Matheus Santana	2014 Nanjing	Swimming	Boys' 100 m freestyle
Gold	Orlando Luz; Marcelo Zormann	2014 Nanjing	Tennis	Boys' doubles
Gold	Layana Colman	2014 Nanjing	Judo	Girls' −52kg
Gold	Flávia Saraiva	2014 Nanjing	Gymnastics	Girls' floor
Gold	Ana Patrícia Ramos; Eduarda Lisboa	2014 Nanjing	Beach volleyball	Girls' doubles
Silver	Matheus Santana	2014 Nanjing	Swimming	Boys' 50 m freestyle
Silver	Marcus Vinícius D'Almeida	2014 Nanjing	Archery	Boys' individual
Silver	Orlando Luz	2014 Nanjing	Tennis	Boys' singles
Silver	Flávia Saraiva	2014 Nanjing	Gymnastics	Girls' balance beam
Silver	Flávia Saraiva	2014 Nanjing	Gymnastics	Girls' artistic individual all-around
Silver	Matheus Santana; Luiz Altamir Melo; Natalia de Luccas; Giovanna Diamante	2014 Nanjing	Swimming	Mixed 4 × 100 m freestyle relay
Bronze	Hugo Calderano	2014 Nanjing	Table tennis	Boys' singles
Gold	Keno Machado	2018 Buenos Aires	Boxing	Boys' 75kg
Gold	Boys' national team: Breno Rosa; Caio Valle; Françoar Rodrigues; Guilherme Sanches; João Victor Sena; Mateus Barbosa da Silva; Matheus Batista; Wesley de França; Vitor Henrique da Silva; Yuri Gavião	2018 Buenos Aires	Futsal	Boys' team
Silver	André de Souza; Lucas Peixoto; Ana Carolina Vieira; Rafaela Raurich	2018 Buenos Aires	Swimming	Mixed 4 × 100 m freestyle relay
Silver	André de Souza; Lucas Peixoto; Murilo Sartori; Vitor de Souza	2018 Buenos Aires	Swimming	Boys' 4 × 100 m freestyle relay
Silver	Rafaela Raurich; Ana Carolina Vieira; Maria Luiza Pessanha; Fernanda de Goeij	2018 Buenos Aires	Swimming	Girls' 4 × 100 m freestyle relay
Silver	Diogo Soares	2018 Buenos Aires	Gymnastics	Boys' horizontal bar
Bronze	Eduarda Rosa	2018 Buenos Aires	Judo	Girls' −78kg
Bronze	Sandy Macedo	2018 Buenos Aires	Taekwondo	Girls' −55kg
Bronze	Diogo Soares	2018 Buenos Aires	Gymnastics	Boys' artistic individual all-around
Bronze	Gilbert Klier	2018 Buenos Aires	Tennis	Boys' singles
Bronze	Lucas Vilar	2018 Buenos Aires	Athletics	Boys' 200 metres
Bronze	Letícia Lima	2018 Buenos Aires	Athletics	Girls' 200 metres
Bronze	Luiz Gabriel Oliveira	2018 Buenos Aires	Boxing	Boys' 52kg
Gold	Clarisse Vallim	2026 Dakar	Judo	Women's 78 kg
Gold	Pyetro Souza	2026 Dakar	Athletics	Men's shot put
Gold	Sara Campos	2026 Dakar	Boxing	Women's 57 kg
Silver	Duda Ribeiro	2026 Dakar	Skateboarding	Women's street
Silver	Ana Júlia Amaral	2026 Dakar	Swimming	Women's 200 m butterfly
Silver	Men's U18 national team: Talisson Andrade; Tiago Azevedo; Giovani Brandão; Tulio Castro; André de Souza; José dos Santos; Luiz Ferreira; Diego Luna; Raphael Martins; Kaike Silveira	2026 Dakar	Beach handball	Men's tournament
Bronze	Ana Júlia Amaral	2026 Dakar	Swimming	Women's 100 m butterfly

=== Winter Youth Olympic Games ===
Medal	Name	Year	Sport	Event
Bronze	Zion Bethônico	2024 Gangwon	Snowboarding	Men's snowboard cross

=== Mixed-NOCs teams ===
Note: Medals awarded at mixed NOCs events are not counted for the respective country in the overall medal table.

Medal	Name	Year	Sport	Event
Gold	Caio Cezar dos Santos	2010 Singapore	Athletics	Boys' medley relay
Silver	Layana Colman	2014 Nanjing	Judo	Mixed team
Silver	Bianca de Souza Rodrigues	2014 Nanjing	Equestrian	Team jumping
Bronze	João dos Santos	2018 Buenos Aires	Judo	Mixed team
Bronze	Jaqueline Lima	2018 Buenos Aires	Badminton	Mixed team

== Medal tables ==
=== Medals by Summer Youth Games ===
Games	Athletes	Gold	Silver	Bronze	Total	Rank
2010 Singapore	81	2	3	1	6	21
(China) 2014 Nanjing	97	6	6	1	13	9
(Argentina) 2018 Buenos Aires	79	2	4	7	13	28
(Senegal) 2026 Dakar	35	3	3	1	7	12
Total		13	16	10	39	14

=== Medals by Winter Youth Games ===
Games	Athletes	Gold	Silver	Bronze	Total	Rank
(Austria) 2012 Innsbruck	2	0	0	0	0	–
(Norway) 2016 Lillehammer	10	0	0	0	0	–
(Switzerland) 2020 Lausanne	12	0	0	0	0	–
(South Korea) 2024 Gangwon	18	0	0	1	1	30
Total		0	0	1	1	39

=== Medals by Summer Youth Sport ===
Leading in that sport

Sport	Gold	Silver	Bronze	Total
Boxing	3	0	1	4
Athletics	2	1	2	5
Judo	2	1	1	4
Swimming	1	6	1	8
Artistic gymnastics	1	3	1	5
Tennis	1	1	1	3
Taekwondo	1	0	1	2
Beach volleyball	1	0	0	1
Futsal	1	0	0	1
Archery	0	1	0	1
Beach handball	0	1	0	1
Shooting	0	1	0	1
Skateboarding	0	1	0	1
Handball	0	0	1	1
Table tennis	0	0	1	1
Totals (15 entries)	13	16	10	39

=== Medals by Winter Youth Sport ===
Leading in that sport

Sport	Gold	Silver	Bronze	Total
Snowboarding	0	0	1	1
Totals (1 entries)	0	0	1	1

=== Medals by gender ===
Gender	Gold	Silver	Bronze	Total
Men	8	8	6	22
Women	5	6	5	16
Mixed	0	2	0	2

== See also ==
- Brazil at the Olympics
- Brazil at the Paralympics
- Brazil at the Pan American Games
- Brazil at the Parapan American Games
- Brazil at the Junior Pan American Games
