= Czech Republic at the Youth Olympics =

- IOC code: CZE
- NOC: Czech Olympic Committee
- Website: www.olympic.cz
- Medals Ranked 27th: Gold 8 Silver 14 Bronze 16 Total 38

Summer appearances
- 2010; 2014; 2018

Winter appearances
- 2012; 2016; 2020; 2024

Czech Republic has participated at the Youth Olympic Games in every edition since the inaugural 2010 Games and has earned medals from every edition.

== Medal tables ==
=== Medals by Summer Games ===
Games	Athletes	Gold	Silver	Bronze	Total	Rank
2010 Singapore	36	1	2	3	6	36
(China) 2014 Nanjing	37	1	3	3	7	40
(Argentina) 2018 Buenos Aires	53	3	3	5	11	21
Total		5	8	11	24	34

=== Medals by Winter Games ===
Games	Athletes	Gold	Silver	Bronze	Total	Rank
(Austria) 2012 Innsbruck	24	1	1	0	2	18
(Norway) 2016 Lillehammer	43	0	2	2	4	20
(Switzerland) 2020 Lausanne	74	1	2	1	4	17
(South Korea) 2024 Gangwon	62	1	1	2	4	19
Total		3	6	5	14	19

=== Medals by summer sport ===
Sport	Gold	Silver	Bronze	Total
Swimming	2	0	2	4
Cycling	1	1	0	2
Judo	1	1	0	2
Athletics	1	0	3	4
Canoeing	0	2	4	6
Rowing	0	2	0	2
Basketball	0	1	0	1
Shooting	0	1	0	1
Fencing	0	0	1	1
Weightlifting	0	0	1	1
Totals (10 entries)	5	8	11	24

=== Medals by winter sport ===
Sport	Gold	Silver	Bronze	Total
Freestyle skiing	1	2	1	4
Biathlon	1	0	1	2
Nordic combined	1	0	1	2
Ice hockey	0	2	0	2
Figure skating	0	1	0	1
Speed skating	0	1	0	1
Ski jumping	0	0	1	1
Snowboarding	0	0	1	1
Totals (8 entries)	3	6	5	14

== List of medalists ==
=== Summer Games ===
Medal	Name	Games	Sport	Event
Gold	David Pulkrábek	2010 Singapore	Judo	Boys' 55 kg
Silver	Gabriela Vognarová	2010 Singapore	Shooting	Girls' 10 metre air rifle
Silver	Pavlína Zástěrová	2010 Singapore	Canoeing	Girls' K1 slalom
Bronze	Barbora Závadová	2010 Singapore	Swimming	Girls' 200m medley
Bronze	Jaromír Mazgal	2010 Singapore	Athletics	Boys' Discus throw
Bronze	Jiří Prskavec	2010 Singapore	Canoeing	Boys' K1 slalom
Gold	Barbora Prudková; Jan Rajchart; Roman Lehký; Nikola Nosková	(China) 2014 Nanjing	Cycling	Mixed team relay
Silver	Lukáš Helešic; Miroslav Jech	(China) 2014 Nanjing	Rowing	Boys' pairs
Silver	Barbora Prudková; Nikola Nosková	(China) 2014 Nanjing	Cycling	Girls' Team
Silver	Martina Satková	(China) 2014 Nanjing	Canoeing	Girls' C1 slalom
Bronze	Michaela Hrubá	(China) 2014 Nanjing	Athletics	Girls' high jump
Bronze	Kryštof Hájek	(China) 2014 Nanjing	Canoeing	Boys' C1 sprint
Bronze	Amálie Hilgertová	(China) 2014 Nanjing	Canoeing	Girls' K1 slalom
Gold	Barbora Seemanová	(Argentina) 2018 Buenos Aires	Swimming	Girls' 100 m freestyle
Gold	Barbora Seemanová	(Argentina) 2018 Buenos Aires	Swimming	Girls' 50 m freestyle
Gold	Barbora Malíková	(Argentina) 2018 Buenos Aires	Athletics	Girls' 400 m
Silver	Martin Bezděk	(Argentina) 2018 Buenos Aires	Judo	Boys' 81 kg
Silver	Anna Santruckova; Eliska Podrazilova	(Argentina) 2018 Buenos Aires	Rowing	Girls' pairs
Silver	Kateřina Galíčková	(Argentina) 2018 Buenos Aires	Basketball	Girls' shoot-out contest
Bronze	František Polák	(Argentina) 2018 Buenos Aires	Weightlifting	Boys' 56 kg
Bronze	Veronika Bieleszova	(Argentina) 2018 Buenos Aires	Fencing	Girls' épée
Bronze	Barbora Seemanová	(Argentina) 2018 Buenos Aires	Swimming	Girls' 200 m freestyle
Bronze	Jiří Minařík	(Argentina) 2018 Buenos Aires	Canoeing	Boys' C1 sprint
Bronze	Martin Florian	(Argentina) 2018 Buenos Aires	Athletics	Boys' javelin throw

=== Summer Games medalists as part of Mixed-NOCs Team ===
Medal	Name	Games	Sport	Event
Gold	Jiří Veselý	2010 Singapore	Tennis	Boys' doubles
Bronze	Michaela Hrubá	(China) 2014 Nanjing	Athletics	Mixed 8x100m relay
Silver	Martin Bezděk	(Argentina) 2018 Buenos Aires	Judo	Mixed team
Bronze	Tereza Švábíková	(Argentina) 2018 Buenos Aires	Badminton	Mixed team

=== Winter Games ===
Medal	Name	Games	Sport	Event
Gold	Tomáš Portyk	(Austria) 2012 Innsbruck	Nordic combined	Individual
Gold	Matěj Švancer	(Switzerland) 2020 Lausanne	Freestyle skiing	Boys' big air
Gold	Ilona Plecháčová	(South Korea) 2024 Gangwon	Biathlon	Women's individual
Silver	Veronika Čamková	(Austria) 2012 Innsbruck	Freestyle skiing	Girls' Ski Cross
Silver	Anna Dušková; Martin Bidař	(Norway) 2016 Lillehammer	Figure skating	Pair skating
Silver	Ice hockey team: Kristyna Blahova Nikola Dyckova Magdalena Erbenova Martina Exnerova Alexandra Halounova Sandra Halounova Karolina Hornicka Karolina Hrdinova Klára Jandušíková Karolina Juricova Anna Kotounova Sarka Krejnikova Laura Lerchova Veronika Lorencova Barbora Machalova Natálie Mlýnková Adela Skrdlova	(Norway) 2016 Lillehammer	Ice hockey	Girls' tournament
Silver	Zuzana Kuršová	(Switzerland) 2020 Lausanne	Speed skating	Girls' mass start
Silver	Diana Cholenská	(Switzerland) 2020 Lausanne	Freestyle skiing	Girls' ski cross
Silver	Ice hockey team: Šimon Bělohorský Jakub Daněk Jan Hrček David Huk Lukáš Kachlíř Šimon Katolický Adam Klaus Jan Láryš Václav Nedorost Filip Novák František Poletín Martin Psohlavec Ben Reisnecker Ondřej Ruml Tobiáš Sekanina Petr Tomek Jakub Vaněček Matěj Weiss	(South Korea) 2024 Gangwon	Ice hockey	Men's tournament
Bronze	Klára Kašparová	(Norway) 2016 Lillehammer	Freestyle skiing	Girls' ski cross
Bronze	Ondřej Pažout	(Norway) 2016 Lillehammer	Nordic combined	Normal hill/5 km
Bronze	Štěpánka Ptáčková	(Switzerland) 2020 Lausanne	Ski jumping	Girls' normal hill
Bronze	Heda Mikolášová; Ilona Plecháčová; Jakub Neuhauser; Lukáš Kulhánek	(South Korea) 2024 Gangwon	Biathlon	Mixed relay
Bronze	Vanessa Volopichová	(South Korea) 2024 Gangwon	Snowboarding	Women's slopestyle

=== Winter Games medalists as part of Mixed-NOCs Team ===
Medal	Name	Games	Sport	Event
Gold	Štěpán Maleček	(Switzerland) 2020 Lausanne	Ice hockey	Boys' 3x3 mixed tournament
Gold	Zuzana Trnková	(Switzerland) 2020 Lausanne	Ice hockey	Girls' 3x3 mixed tournament
Silver	Anna Dušková; Martin Bidař	(Norway) 2016 Lillehammer	Figure skating	Team trophy
Bronze	Matyáš Šapovaliv	(Switzerland) 2020 Lausanne	Ice hockey	Boys' 3x3 mixed tournament
Bronze	Vít Chabičovský	(Switzerland) 2020 Lausanne	Curling	Mixed doubles

== Flag bearers ==
#	Games	Season	Flag bearer	Sport
7	2024 Gangwon	Winter	Lukáš Kulhánek & Ilona Plecháčová	Biathlon
6	2020 Lausanne	Winter	Andrea Trnková & Timon Drahoňovský	Ice hockey & skeleton
5	2018 Buenos Aires	Summer	Barbora Malíková	Athletics
4	2016 Lillehammer	Winter	Magdalena Erbenová	Ice hockey
3	2014 Nanjing	Summer	Tomáš Rousek	Canoeing
2	2012 Innsbruck	Winter	Petr Knop	Cross-country skiing
1	2010 Singapore	Summer	Jaromír Mazgal	Athletics

== See also ==
- Czech Republic at the Olympics
- Czech Republic at the Paralympics
