= Belgium at the Youth Olympics =

Performance of Belgium at the Youth Olympic Games

- IOC code: BEL
- NOC: Belgian Olympic Committee
- Website: www.teambelgium.be (in English)
- Medals Ranked 42nd: Gold 5 Silver 8 Bronze 8 Total 21

Summer appearances
- 2010; 2014; 2018

Winter appearances
- 2012; 2016; 2020; 2024

Belgium has participated at the Youth Olympic Games in every edition since the inaugural 2010 Games and has earned medals from every edition.

== Medal tables ==
=== Medals by Summer Games ===
Games	Athletes	Gold	Silver	Bronze	Total	Rank
2010 Singapore	52	2	1	2	5	27
(China) 2014 Nanjing	33	0	2	4	6	57
(Argentina) 2018 Buenos Aires	32	2	3	2	7	30
(Senegal) 2026 Dakar						
Total		4	6	8	18	37

=== Medals by Winter Games ===
Games	Athletes	Gold	Silver	Bronze	Total	Rank
(Austria) 2012 Innsbruck	7	0	1	0	1	24
(Norway) 2016 Lillehammer	9	0	1	0	1	24
(Switzerland) 2020 Lausanne	9	1	0	0	1	20
(South Korea) 2024 Gangwon	0	0	0	0	-	
Total		1	2	0	3	23

=== Medals by summer sport ===
Sport	Gold	Silver	Bronze	Total
Judo	1	1	2	4
Athletics	1	0	1	2
Karate	1	0	0	1
Volleyball	1	0	0	1
Taekwondo	0	2	2	4
Canoeing	0	1	1	2
Basketball	0	1	0	1
Gymnastics	0	1	0	1
Archery	0	0	1	1
Hockey	0	0	1	1
Totals (10 entries)	4	6	8	18

=== Medals by winter sport ===
Sport	Gold	Silver	Bronze	Total
Snowboarding	1	0	0	1
Alpine skiing	0	1	0	1
Freestyle skiing	0	1	0	1
Totals (3 entries)	1	2	0	3

== List of medalists ==
=== Summer Games ===
Medal	Name	Games	Sport	Event
Gold	Lola Mansour	2010 Singapore	Judo	Girls' -78 kg
Gold	Delfien Brugman; Valerie El Houssine; Laura Heyrman; Laurine Klinkenberg; Tara Lauwers; Lotte Penders; Elien Ruysschaert; Ilka Van de Vyver; Lore Van den Vonder; Mira Juwet; Sophie Van Nimmen; Karolien Vleugels	2010 Singapore	Volleyball	Girls'
Silver	Toma Nikiforov	2010 Singapore	Judo	Boys' -100 kg
Bronze	Hermien Peters	2010 Singapore	Canoeing	Girls' K1 sprint
Bronze	Arnaud Flamand; Dimitri Cuvelier; Arthur Van Doren; Matthias Dubois; Antoine Legrain; Louis Rombouts; Dorian Thiery; Thomas Van der Gracht; Alexander Hendrickx; Bjorn Delmoitie; Nicolas De Kerpel; Mathew Cobbaert; Quentin Bigare; Gaetan Perez; Benjamin van Dam; Arno Devreker	2010 Singapore	Hockey	Boys'
Silver	Indra Craen	(China) 2014 Nanjing	Taekwondo	Girls' -49 kg
Silver	Luka van den Keybus	(China) 2014 Nanjing	Gymnastics	Boys' horizontal bar
Bronze	Jorre Verstraeten	(China) 2014 Nanjing	Judo	Boys' −55 kg
Bronze	Si Mohamed Ketbi	(China) 2014 Nanjing	Taekwondo	Boys' −55 kg
Bronze	Laura Roebben	(China) 2014 Nanjing	Taekwondo	Girls' −55 kg
Bronze	Chloë Beaucarne	(China) 2014 Nanjing	Athletics	Girls' 100 m hurdles
Gold	Maité Beernaert	(Argentina) 2018 Buenos Aires	Athletics	Girls' long jump
Gold	Quentin Mahauden	(Argentina) 2018 Buenos Aires	Karate	Boys' −68 kg
Silver	Sacha Deheneffe; Sam Hofman; Moussa Noterman; Ferre Van der Hoydonck	(Argentina) 2018 Buenos Aires	Basketball	Boys'
Silver	Jules Vangeel	(Argentina) 2018 Buenos Aires	Canoeing	Boys' K1 sprint
Silver	Badr Achab	(Argentina) 2018 Buenos Aires	Taekwondo	Boys' −73 kg
Bronze	Senna Roos	(Argentina) 2018 Buenos Aires	Archery	Boys' singles
Bronze	Alessia Corrao	(Argentina) 2018 Buenos Aires	Judo	Girls' −63 kg

=== Summer Games medalists as part of Mixed-NOCs Team ===
Medal	Name	Games	Sport	Event
Gold	Nicola Philippaerts	2010 Singapore	Equestrian	Team jumping
Silver	Lola Mansour	2010 Singapore	Judo	Mixed team
Bronze	An-Sophie Mestach	2010 Singapore	Tennis	Girls' doubles
Silver	Simon Jan Morssinkhof	(Argentina) 2018 Buenos Aires	Equestrian	Team jumping
Bronze	Julien Carraggi	(Argentina) 2018 Buenos Aires	Badminton	Mixed team

=== Winter Games ===
Medal	Name	Games	Sport	Event
Silver	Dries Van Den Broecke	(Austria) 2012 Innsbruck	Alpine skiing	Boys' slalom
Silver	Xander Vercammen	(Norway) 2016 Lillehammer	Freestyle skiing	Boys' ski cross
Gold	Evy Poppe	(Switzerland) 2020 Lausanne	Snowboarding	Girls' slopestyle

=== Winter Games medalists as part of Mixed-NOCs Team ===
Medal	Name	Games	Sport	Event
Gold	Stijn Desmet	(Norway) 2016 Lillehammer	Short track	Mixed team relay
Gold	Anke Steeno	(Switzerland) 2020 Lausanne	Ice hockey	Girls' 3x3 mixed tournament

== Flag bearers ==
#	Games	Season	Flag bearer	Sport
6	2020 Lausanne	Winter	Louis Masquelier	Alpine skiing
5	2018 Buenos Aires	Summer	Henri Demesmaeker	Sailing
4	2016 Lillehammer	Winter	Sam Maes	Alpine skiing
3	2014 Nanjing	Summer	Indra Craen	Taekwondo
2	2012 Innsbruck	Winter	Sebbe De Buck	Snowboarding
1	2010 Singapore	Summer	An-Sophie Mestach	Tennis

== See also ==
- Belgium at the Olympics
- Belgium at the Paralympics
