= Alpine skiing at the Winter Youth Olympics =

- Governing body: FIS
- Events: 9 (men: 4; womens: 4; mixed: 1)

Games
- 2012; 2016; 2020; 2024

Alpine skiing was inducted at the Youth Olympic Games at the inaugural edition in 2012.

== Medal summaries ==
=== Boys' events ===
==== Slalom ====
| Games | Gold | Silver | Bronze |
|---|---|---|---|
| 2012 Innsbruck | Sandro Simonet; Switzerland | Dries van der Broecke; Belgium | Mathias Elmar Graf; Austria |
| 2016 Lillehammer | Manuel Traninger; Austria | Filip Vennerström; Sweden | Odin Vassbotn Breivik; Norway |
| 2020 Lausanne | Adam Hofstedt; Sweden | Luc Roduit; Switzerland | Edoardo Saracco; Italy |

==== Giant slalom ====
| Games | Gold | Silver | Bronze |
|---|---|---|---|
| 2012 Innsbruck | Marco Schwarz; Austria | Hannes Zingerle; Italy | Sandro Simonet; Switzerland |
| 2016 Lillehammer | River Radamus; United States | Yohei Koyama; Japan | Anton Grammel; Germany |
| 2020 Lausanne | Philip Hoffmann; Austria | Sandro Zurbrügg; Switzerland | Luc Roduit; Switzerland |

==== Super-G ====
| Games | Gold | Silver | Bronze |
|---|---|---|---|
| 2012 Innsbruck | Adam Lamhamedi; Morocco | Fredrik Bauer; Sweden | Joan Verdu Sanchez; Andorra |
| 2016 Lillehammer | River Radamus; United States | Pietro Canzio; Italy | Manuel Traninger; Austria |
| 2020 Lausanne | Adam Hofstedt; Sweden | Rok Ažnoh; Slovenia | Luc Roduit; Switzerland |

==== Alpine combined ====
| Games | Gold | Silver | Bronze |
|---|---|---|---|
| 2012 Innsbruck | Marco Schwarz; Austria | Miha Hrobat; Slovenia | Sandro Simonet; Switzerland |
| 2016 Lillehammer | River Radamus; United States | Manuel Traninger; Austria | Pietro Canzio; Italy |
| 2020 Lausanne | Auguste Aulnette; France Mikkel Remsøy; Norway | Not awarded | Adam Hofstedt; Sweden |

=== Girls' events ===
==== Slalom ====
| Games | Gold | Silver | Bronze |
|---|---|---|---|
| 2012 Innsbruck | Petra Vlhová; Slovakia | Roni Remme; Canada | Ekaterina Tkachenko; Russia |
| 2016 Lillehammer | Aline Danioth; Switzerland | Ali Nullmeyer; Canada | Meta Hrovat; Slovenia |
| 2020 Lausanne | Emma Sahlin; Sweden | Lena Volken; Switzerland | Lara Klein; Germany |

==== Giant slalom ====
| Games | Gold | Silver | Bronze |
|---|---|---|---|
| 2012 Innsbruck | Clara Direz; France | Estelle Alphand; France | Jasmina Suter; Switzerland |
| 2016 Lillehammer | Mélanie Meillard; Switzerland | Katrin Hirtl-Stanggassinger; Germany | Aline Danioth; Switzerland |
| 2020 Lausanne | Amélie Klopfenstein; Switzerland | Rosa Pohjolainen; Finland | Amanda Salzgeber; Austria |

==== Super-G ====
| Games | Gold | Silver | Bronze |
|---|---|---|---|
| 2012 Innsbruck | Estelle Alphand; France | Nora Grieg Christensen; Norway | Christina Ager; Austria |
| 2016 Lillehammer | Nadine Fest; Austria | Julia Scheib; Austria | Aline Danioth; Switzerland |
| 2020 Lausanne | Amélie Klopfenstein; Switzerland | Caitlin McFarlane; France | Noa Szollos; Israel |

==== Alpine combined ====
| Games | Gold | Silver | Bronze |
|---|---|---|---|
| 2012 Innsbruck | Magdalena Fjällström; Sweden | Estelle Alphand; France | Adriana Jelinkova; Netherlands |
| 2016 Lillehammer | Aline Danioth; Switzerland | Mélanie Meillard; Switzerland | Katrin Hirtl-Stanggassinger; Germany |
| 2020 Lausanne | Amanda Salzgeber; Austria | Noa Szollos; Israel | Amélie Klopfenstein; Switzerland |

=== Mixed events ===
==== Parallel team event ====
| Games | Gold | Silver | Bronze |
|---|---|---|---|
| 2012 Innsbruck | Martina Rettenwender; Marco Schwarz; Christina Ager; Mathias Graf; Austria | Nora Grieg Christenen; Martin Fjeldberg; Mina Fürst Holtmann; Marcus Monsen; Norway | Estelle Alphand; Victor Schuller; Clara Direz; Leny Herpin; France |
| 2016 Lillehammer | Lucia Rispler; Jonas Stockinger; Germany | Anastasiia Silanteva; Aleksey Konkov; Russia | Riikka Honkanen; Sampo Kankkunen; Finland |
| 2020 Lausanne | Rosa Pohjolainen; Jaakko Tapanainen; Finland | Lara Klein; Max Geissler-Hauber; Germany | Amanda Salzgeber; Philip Hoffmann; Austria |
| 2024 Gangwon | Maja Waroschitz; Florian Neumayer; Austria | Astrid Hedin; Elliot Westlund; Sweden | Amélie Björkstén; Altti Pyrrö; Finland |

== Medal table ==
As of the 2020 Winter Youth Olympics.

| Rank | Nation | Gold | Silver | Bronze | Total |
|---|---|---|---|---|---|
| 1 | Austria | 7 | 2 | 5 | 14 |
| 2 | Switzerland | 6 | 4 | 8 | 18 |
| 3 | Sweden | 4 | 2 | 1 | 7 |
| 4 | France | 3 | 3 | 1 | 7 |
| 5 | United States | 3 | 0 | 0 | 3 |
| 6 | Germany | 1 | 2 | 3 | 6 |
| 7 | Norway | 1 | 2 | 1 | 4 |
| 8 | Finland | 1 | 1 | 1 | 3 |
| 9 | Morocco | 1 | 0 | 0 | 1 |
| 9 | Slovakia | 1 | 0 | 0 | 1 |
| 11 | Italy | 0 | 2 | 2 | 4 |
| 12 | Slovenia | 0 | 2 | 1 | 3 |
| 13 | Canada | 0 | 2 | 0 | 2 |
| 14 | Israel | 0 | 1 | 1 | 2 |
| 14 | Russia | 0 | 1 | 1 | 2 |
| 16 | Belgium | 0 | 1 | 0 | 1 |
| 16 | Japan | 0 | 1 | 0 | 1 |
| 18 | Andorra | 0 | 0 | 1 | 1 |
| 18 | Netherlands | 0 | 0 | 1 | 1 |
| Totals (19 entries) | | 28 | 26 | 27 | 81 |

== See also ==
- Alpine skiing at the Winter Olympics
- Alpine skiing at the Winter Paralympics
