= Luge at the Winter Youth Olympics =

- Governing body: FIL
- Events: 5 (men: 2; women: 2; mixed: 1)

Games
- 2012; 2016; 2020; 2024

Luge was inducted at the Youth Olympic Games at the inaugural edition in 2012.

A total of four events were held at the first two editions: boys' and girls' singles, a boys' doubles and a mixed relay event. For 2020, a women's doubles event has been added.

== Medalists summary ==
=== Boys' singles ===
| Events | Gold | Silver | Bronze |
|---|---|---|---|
| 2012 Innsbruck | Christian Paffe; Germany | Riks Kristens Rozītis; Latvia | Toni Graefe; Germany |
| 2016 Lillehammer | Kristers Aparjods; Latvia | Paul-Lukas Heider; Germany | Reid Watts; Canada |
| 2020 Lausanne | Gints Bērziņš; Latvia | Pavel Repilov; Russia | Timon Grancagnolo; Germany |
| 2024 Gangwon | Leon Haselrieder; Italy | Paul Socher; Austria | Philipp Brunner; Italy |

=== Girls' singles ===
| Events | Gold | Silver | Bronze |
|---|---|---|---|
| 2012 Innsbruck | Miriam-Stefanie Kastlunger; Austria | Saskia Langer; Germany | Ulla Zirne; Latvia |
| 2016 Lillehammer | Brooke Apshkrum; Canada | Jessica Tiebel; Germany | Madeleine Egle; Austria |
| 2020 Lausanne | Merle Fräbel; Germany | Jessica Degenhardt; Germany | Diana Loginova; Russia |
| 2024 Gangwon | Antonia Pietschmann; Germany | Alexandra Oberstolz; Italy | Marie Riedl; Austria |

=== Boys' doubles ===
| Events | Gold | Silver | Bronze |
|---|---|---|---|
| 2012 Innsbruck | Florian Gruber; Simon Kainzwaldner; Italy | Tim Brendl; Florian Funk; Germany | Ty Andersen; Pat Edmunds; United States |
| 2016 Lillehammer | Felix Schwarz; Lukas Gufler; Italy | Hannes Orlamünder; Paul Gubitz; Germany | Vsevolod Kashkin; Konstantin Korshunov; Russia |
| 2020 Lausanne | Moritz Jäger; Valentin Steudte; Germany | Kaspars Rinks; Ardis Liepiņš; Latvia | Mikhail Karnaukhov; Iurii Chirva; Russia |
| 2024 Gangwon | Italy; Philipp Brunner; Manuel Weissensteiner | Latvia; Jānis Gruzdulis-Borovojs; Ēdens Eduards Čepulis | Germany; Louis Grünbeck; Maximilian Kührt |

=== Girls' doubles ===
| Events | Gold | Silver | Bronze |
|---|---|---|---|
| 2020 Lausanne | Jessica Degenhardt; Vanessa Schneider; Germany | Caitlin Nash; Natalie Corless; Canada | Viktorija Ziediņa; Selīna Elizabete Zvilna; Latvia |
| 2024 Gangwon | Alexandra Oberstolz; Katharina Sofie Kofler; Italy | Marie Riedl; Nina Lerch; Austria | Lina Riedl; Anna Lerch; Austria |

=== Mixed relay ===
| Events | Gold | Silver | Bronze |
|---|---|---|---|
| 2012 Innsbruck | United States; Summer Britcher; Tucker West; Ty Andersen; Pat Edmunds | Germany; Saskia Langer; Christian Paffe; Tim Brendl; Florian Funk | Austria; Miriam Kastlunger; Armin Frauscher; Thomas Steu; Lorenz Koller |
| 2016 Lillehammer | Germany; Jessica Tiebel; Paul-Lukas Heider; Hannes Orlamünder; Paul Gubitz | Russia; Olesya Mikhaylenko; Evgenii Petrov; Vsevolod Kashkin; Konstantin Korshunov | Italy; Marion Oberhofer; Fabian Malleier; Felix Schwarz; Lukas Gufler |
| 2020 Lausanne | Russia; Diana Loginova; Pavel Repilov; Mikhail Karnaukhov; Iurii Chirva | Germany; Merle Fräbel; Timon Grancagnolo; Moritz Jäger; Valentin Steudte | Latvia; Justīne Maskale; Gints Bērziņš; Kaspars Rinks; Ardis Liepiņš |
| 2024 Gangwon | Italy; Alexandra Oberstolz; Leon Haselrieder; Philipp Brunner; Manuel Weissensteiner | Latvia; Margita Sirsniņa; Edvards Marts Markitāns; Jānis Gruzdulis-Borovojs; Ēdens Eduards Cepulis | Austria; Marie Riedl; Paul Socher; Johannes Scharnagl; Moritz Schiegl |

== Medal table ==
As of the 2016 Winter Youth Olympics.

| Rank | Nation | Gold | Silver | Bronze | Total |
|---|---|---|---|---|---|
| 1 | Germany | 2 | 6 | 1 | 9 |
| 2 | Italy | 2 | 0 | 1 | 3 |
| 3 | Latvia | 1 | 1 | 1 | 3 |
| 4 | Austria | 1 | 0 | 2 | 3 |
| 5 | Canada | 1 | 0 | 1 | 2 |
| 5 | United States | 1 | 0 | 1 | 2 |
| 7 | Russia | 0 | 1 | 1 | 2 |
| Totals (7 entries) | | 8 | 8 | 8 | 24 |

== See also ==
- Luge at the Winter Olympics
