= List of Youth Olympic venues =

The Youth Olympic Games (YOG) is an international multi-sport event organized by the International Olympic Committee. The games are held every four years in staggered summer and winter events consistent with the current Olympic Games format, though in reverse order with Winter Games held in leap years instead of Summer Games.

== Current sports ==
=== Alpine skiing ===
For the Youth Olympic Games, there are three venues that have been or will be used for alpine skiing.

Games	Venue	Other sports hosted at venue for those games	Capacity	Ref.
2012 Innsbruck	Patscherkofel	None	2,000	
2016 Lillehammer	Hafjell Olympic Slope	None	25,000	
2020 Lausanne	Les Diablerets Alpine Centre	None	Not listed	
2024 Gangwon				

=== Archery ===
For the Youth Olympic Games, there are three venues that have been or will be used for archery.

Games	Venue	Other sports hosted at venue for those games	Capacity	Ref.
2010 Singapore	Kallang Field	None	500	
2014 Nanjing	Fangshan Archery Field	None	1,000	
2018 Buenos Aires	Parque Sarmiento Archery Range	None	Not listed	
2026 Dakar				

=== Athletics ===
For the Youth Olympic Games, there are four venues that have been or will be used for athletics.

Games	Venue	Other sports hosted at venue for those games	Capacity	Ref.
2010 Singapore	Bishan Stadium	None	4,100	
2014 Nanjing	Nanjing Olympic Sports Centre Stadium	None	26,000	
2018 Buenos Aires	Youth Olympic Centre Athletics Field	None	Not listed	
2018 Buenos Aires	Youth Olympic Centre Modern Pentathlon & Cross Country	Modern pentathlon	Not listed	
2026 Dakar				

=== Badminton ===
For the Youth Olympic Games, there are three venues that have been or will be used for badminton.

Games	Venue	Other sports hosted at venue for those games	Capacity	Ref.
2010 Singapore	Singapore Indoor Stadium	Table tennis	5,000	
2014 Nanjing	Nanjing Sport Institute Gymnasium	None	3,000	
2018 Buenos Aires	Tecnópolis Badminton Arena	None	Not listed	
2026 Dakar				

=== Baseball5 ===
Baseball5 is added to 2026 Summer Youth Olympics for the first time.

Games	Venue	Other sports hosted at venue for those games	Capacity	Ref.
2026 Dakar				

=== Basketball 3x3 ===
For the Youth Olympic Games, there are three venues that have been or will be used for basketball 3x3.

Games	Venue	Other sports hosted at venue for those games	Capacity	Ref.
2010 Singapore	*scape	None	1,000	
2014 Nanjing	Wutaishan Basketball Venue	None	1,500	
2018 Buenos Aires	Parque Mujeres Argentinas	Breaking, Cycling, Sport climbing	940	
2026 Dakar				

=== Beach handball ===
For the Youth Olympic Games, there are one venue that have been or will be used for beach handball.

Games	Venue	Other sports hosted at venue for those games	Capacity	Ref.
2018 Buenos Aires	Parque Sarmiento Beach Handball Arena	None	1,632	
2026 Dakar				

=== Beach volleyball ===
For the Youth Olympic Games, there are two venues that have been or will be used for beach volleyball.

Games	Venue	Other sports hosted at venue for those games	Capacity	Ref.
2014 Nanjing	Nanjing Sports Park Complex Beach Volleyball Venue	None	2,000	
2018 Buenos Aires	Beach Volleyball Arena	None	1,660	
2026 Dakar				

=== Biathlon ===
For the Youth Olympic Games, there are three venues that have been or will be used for biathlon .

Games	Venue	Other sports hosted at venue for those games	Capacity	Ref.
2012 Innsbruck	Seefeld Arena	Cross-country skiing, Nordic combined, Ski jumping	2,500	
2016 Lillehammer	Birkebeineren Biathlon Stadium	None	30,000	
2020 Lausanne	Les Tuffes Nordic Centre	Nordic combined	Not listed	
2024 Gangwon				

=== Bobsleigh ===
For the Youth Olympic Games, there are four venues that have been or will be used for bobsleigh.

Games	Venue	Other sports hosted at venue for those games	Capacity	Ref.
2012 Innsbruck	Olympic Sliding Centre Innsbruck	Luge, Skeleton	1,500	
2016 Lillehammer	Lillehammer Olympic Sliding Centre	Luge, Skeleton	2,000	
2020 Lausanne	St. Moritz Olympia Bob Run	Luge, Skeleton	Not listed	
2024 Gangwon				

=== Boxing ===
For the Youth Olympic Games, there are three venues that have been or will be used for boxing.

Games	Venue	Other sports hosted at venue for those games	Capacity	Ref.
2010 Singapore	Suntec International Convention Centre	Fencing, Handball, Judo, Taekwondo, Wrestling	1,000	
2014 Nanjing	Nanjing International Expo Center	Fencing, Modern pentathlon, Taekwondo, Weightlifting	1,000	
2018 Buenos Aires	Youth Olympic Centre Oceania Pavilion	Taekwondo	1,012	
2026 Dakar				

=== Breaking ===
For the Youth Olympic Games, there are one venue that have been or will be used for breaking.

Games	Venue	Other sports hosted at venue for those games	Capacity	Ref.
2018 Buenos Aires	Parque Mujeres Argentinas	Basketball 3x3, Cycling, Sport climbing	700	
2026 Dakar				

=== Canoeing ===
For the Youth Olympic Games, there are three venues that have been or will be used for canoeing.

Games	Venue	Other sports hosted at venue for those games	Capacity	Ref.
2010 Singapore	Marina Reservoir	Rowing	1,000	
2014 Nanjing	Xuanwu Lake Rowing–Canoeing Venue	Rowing	1,000	
2018 Buenos Aires	Diques Puerto Madero	Rowing	Not listed	
2026 Dakar				

=== Coastal rowing ===
Coastal rowing is added to 2026 Summer Youth Olympics for the first time.

Games	Venue	Other sports hosted at venue for those games	Capacity	Ref.
2026 Dakar				

=== Cross-country skiing ===
For the Youth Olympic Games, there are three venues that have been or will be used for cross-country skiing.

Games	Venue	Other sports hosted at venue for those games	Capacity	Ref.
2012 Innsbruck	Seefeld Arena	Biathlon, Nordic combined, Ski jumping	2,500	
2016 Lillehammer	Birkebeineren Cross-Country Stadium	Nordic combined	30,000	
2020 Lausanne	Vallée de Joux Cross-Country Centre	None	Not listed	
2024 Gangwon				

=== Curling ===
For the Youth Olympic Games, there are three venues that have been or will be used for biathlon .

Games	Venue	Other sports hosted at venue for those games	Capacity	Ref.
2012 Innsbruck	Innsbruck Exhibition Centre	None	600	
2016 Lillehammer	Curling Hall	None	500	

=== Cycling ===
For the Youth Olympic Games, there are six venues that have been or will be used for cycling.

Games	Venue	Other sports hosted at venue for those games	Capacity	Ref.
2010 Singapore	Tampines Bike Park	None	Not listed	
2010 Singapore	The Float@Marina Bay	None	25,000	
2014 Nanjing	Laoshan National Park	None	Not listed	
2014 Nanjing	Youth Olympic Sports Park	None	2,000	
2018 Buenos Aires	Bosques de Palermo	Triathlon	Not listed	
2018 Buenos Aires	Parque Mujeres Argentinas	Basketball 3x3, Breaking, Sport climbing	Not listed	
2026 Dakar				

=== Diving ===
For the Youth Olympic Games, there are four venues that have been or will be used for diving.

Games	Venue	Other sports hosted at venue for those games	Capacity	Ref.
2010 Singapore	Toa Payoh Swimming Complex	None	800	
2014 Nanjing	Nanjing Olympic Sports Centre Natatorium	Modern pentathlon, Swimming	2,500	
2018 Buenos Aires	Youth Olympic Centre Natatorium	Modern pentathlon, Swimming	Not listed	
2026 Dakar				

=== Equestrian ===
For the Youth Olympic Games, there are three venues that have been or will be used for equestrian.

Games	Venue	Other sports hosted at venue for those games	Capacity	Ref.
2010 Singapore	Singapore Turf Club Riding Centre	None	1,500	
2014 Nanjing	Xinzhuang Equestrian Venue	None	1,500	
2018 Buenos Aires	Club Hípico Argentino	None	1,523	
2026 Dakar				

=== Fencing ===
For the Youth Olympic Games, there are three venues that have been or will be used for fencing.

Games	Venue	Other sports hosted at venue for those games	Capacity	Ref.
2010 Singapore	Suntec International Convention Centre	Boxing, Handball, Judo, Taekwondo, Wrestling	1,500	
2014 Nanjing	Nanjing International Expo Center	Boxing, Modern pentathlon, Taekwondo, Weightlifting	1,000	
2018 Buenos Aires	Youth Olympic Centre Africa Pavilion	Modern pentathlon	758	
2026 Dakar				

=== Figure skating ===
For the Youth Olympic Games, there are three venues that have been or will be used for figure skating.

Games	Venue	Other sports hosted at venue for those games	Capacity	Ref.
2012 Innsbruck	Olympiahalle	Short track speed skating	2,889	
2016 Lillehammer	Hamar Olympic Amphitheatre	None	5,500	

=== Freestyle skiing ===
For the Youth Olympic Games, there are three venues that have been or will be used for freestyle skiing.

Games	Venue	Other sports hosted at venue for those games	Capacity	Ref.
2012 Innsbruck	Kühtai	Snowboarding	1,000	
2016 Lillehammer	Hafjell Freepark	Snowboarding	25,000	
2016 Lillehammer	Oslo Vinterpark Halfpipe	Snowboarding	4,000	

=== Futsal ===
For the Youth Olympic Games, there are two venues that have been or will be used for futsal.

Games	Venue	Other sports hosted at venue for those games	Capacity	Ref.
2018 Buenos Aires	Tecnópolis Futsal Main Stadium	Badminton, Table tennis	4,000	
2018 Buenos Aires	CeNARD	None	1,000	
2026 Dakar				

=== Golf ===
For the Youth Olympic Games, there are two venues that have been or will be used for golf.

Games	Venue	Other sports hosted at venue for those games	Capacity	Ref.
2014 Nanjing	Zhongshan International Golf Club	None	Not listed	
2018 Buenos Aires	Hurlingham Club	None	Not listed	
2026 Dakar				

=== Gymnastics ===
For the Youth Olympic Games, there are three venues that have been or will be used for gymnastics.

Games	Venue	Other sports hosted at venue for those games	Capacity	Ref.
2010 Singapore	Bishan Sports Hall	None	1,920	
2014 Nanjing	Nanjing Olympic Sports Center Gymnasium	None	13,500	
2018 Buenos Aires	Youth Olympic Centre America Pavilion	None	1,782	
2026 Dakar				

=== Hockey 5s ===
For the Youth Olympic Games, there are two venues that have been or will be used for hockey 5s.

Games	Venue	Other sports hosted at venue for those games	Capacity	Ref.
2014 Nanjing	Youth Olympic Sports Park Hockey Stadium	None	50	
2018 Buenos Aires	Youth Olympic Centre Hockey Field	None	3,060	
2026 Dakar		None		

=== Ice hockey ===
For the Youth Olympic Games, there are three venues that have been or will be used for ice hockey.

Games	Venue	Other sports hosted at venue for those games	Capacity	Ref.
2012 Innsbruck	Tyrolean Ice Arena	None	2,620	
2016 Lillehammer	Kristins Hall	None	500	

=== Judo ===
For the Youth Olympic Games, there are three venues that have been or will be used for judo.

Games	Venue	Other sports hosted at venue for those games	Capacity	Ref.
2010 Singapore	Suntec International Convention Centre	Boxing, Fencing, Handball, Taekwondo, Wrestling	1,000	
2014 Nanjing	Longjiang Gymnasium	Wrestling	2,800	
2018 Buenos Aires	Youth Olympic Centre Asia Pavilion	Wrestling	1,182	
2026 Dakar				

=== Karate ===
For the Youth Olympic Games, there are one venue that have been or will be used for karate.

Games	Venue	Other sports hosted at venue for those games	Capacity	Ref.
2018 Buenos Aires	Youth Olympic Centre Europe Pavilion	Weightlifting	997	
2026 Dakar				

=== Luge ===
For the Youth Olympic Games, there are three venues that have been or will be used for luge.

Games	Venue	Other sports hosted at venue for those games	Capacity	Ref.
2012 Innsbruck	Olympic Sliding Centre Innsbruck	Bobsleigh, Skeleton	1,500	
2016 Lillehammer	Lillehammer Olympic Sliding Centre	Bobsleigh, Skeleton	2,000	

=== Modern pentathlon ===
For the Youth Olympic Games, there are nine venues that have been or will be used for modern pentathlon.

Games	Venue	Other sports hosted at venue for those games	Capacity	Ref.
2010 Singapore	Singapore Sports School Gymnasium	None	300	
2010 Singapore	Singapore Sports School Shooting Range	Shooting	500	
2010 Singapore	Singapore Sports School Swimming Complex	Swimming	1,800	
2014 Nanjing	Nanjing International Expo Center	Boxing, Fencing, Taekwondo, Weightlifting	1,000	
2014 Nanjing	Nanjing Olympic Sports Centre Modern Pentathlon Venue	None	1,000	
2014 Nanjing	Nanjing Olympic Sports Centre Natatorium	Diving, Swimming	2,500	
2018 Buenos Aires	Youth Olympic Centre Africa Pavilion	Fencing	758	
2018 Buenos Aires	Youth Olympic Centre Modern Pentathlon & Cross Country	Athletics	Not listed	
2018 Buenos Aires	Youth Olympic Centre Natatorium	Diving, Swimming	Not listed	
2026 Dakar				

=== Nordic combined ===
For the Youth Olympic Games, there are three venues that have been or will be used for Nordic combined.

Games	Venue	Other sports hosted at venue for those games	Capacity	Ref.
2012 Innsbruck	Seefeld Arena	Biathlon, Cross-country skiing, Ski jumping	2,500	
2016 Lillehammer	Birkebeineren Cross-Country Stadium	Cross-country skiing	30,000	

=== Rugby sevens ===
For the Youth Olympic Games, there are two venues that have been or will be used for rugby sevens.

Games	Venue	Other sports hosted at venue for those games	Capacity	Ref.
2014 Nanjing	Youth Olympic Sports Park Rugby Field	None	2,000	
2018 Buenos Aires	Club Atlético San Isidro Sede La Boya	None	Not listed	
2026 Dakar				

=== Sailing ===
For the Youth Olympic Games, there are four venues that have been or will be used for sailing.

Games	Venue	Other sports hosted at venue for those games	Capacity	Ref.
2010 Singapore	National Sailing Centre	None	Not listed	
2014 Nanjing	Jinniu Lake Sailing Venue	None	Not listed	
2018 Buenos Aires	Club Náutico San Isidro	None	Not listed	
2026 Dakar				

=== Shooting ===
For the Youth Olympic Games, there are four venues that have been or will be used for shooting.

Games	Venue	Other sports hosted at venue for those games	Capacity	Ref.
2010 Singapore	Singapore Sports School Shooting Range	Modern pentathlon	500	
2014 Nanjing	Fangshan Shooting Hall	None	250	
2018 Buenos Aires	Parque Sarmiento Shooting Range	None	Not listed	
2026 Dakar				

=== Short track speed skating ===
For the Youth Olympic Games, there are three venues that have been or will be used for short track speed skating.

Games	Venue	Other sports hosted at venue for those games	Capacity	Ref.
2012 Innsbruck	Olympiahalle	Figure skating	2,889	
2016 Lillehammer	Gjøvik Olympic Cavern Hall	None	5,000	

=== Skateboarding ===
For the Youth Olympic Games, there are one venue that have been used for skateboarding.

Games	Venue	Other sports hosted at venue for those games	Capacity	Ref.
2014 Nanjing (demonstration)	Fishmouth Park	Sport climbing, Sport climbing, Wushu	Not listed	
2026 Dakar				

=== Skeleton ===
For the Youth Olympic Games, there are three venues that have been or will be used for skeleton.

Games	Venue	Other sports hosted at venue for those games	Capacity	Ref.
2012 Innsbruck	Olympic Sliding Centre Innsbruck	Bobsleigh, Luge	1,500	
2016 Lillehammer	Lillehammer Olympic Sliding Centre	Bobsleigh, Luge	2,000	

=== Ski jumping ===
For the Youth Olympic Games, there are three venues that have been or will be used for ski jumping.

Games	Venue	Other sports hosted at venue for those games	Capacity	Ref.
2012 Innsbruck	Seefeld Arena	Biathlon, Cross-country skiing, Nordic combined	2,500	
2016 Lillehammer	Lysgårdsbakken Ski Jumping Arena	Nordic combined	35,000	

=== Snowboarding ===
For the Youth Olympic Games, there are three venues that have been or will be used for snowboarding.

Games	Venue	Other sports hosted at venue for those games	Capacity	Ref.
2012 Innsbruck	Kühtai	Freestyle skiing	1,000	
2016 Lillehammer	Hafjell Freepark	Freestyle skiing	25,000	
2016 Lillehammer	Oslo Vinterpark Halfpipe	Freestyle skiing	4,000	

=== Speed skating ===
For the Youth Olympic Games, there are three venues that have been or will be used for speed skating.

Games	Venue	Other sports hosted at venue for those games	Capacity	Ref.
2012 Innsbruck	Eisschnelllaufbahn	None	1,500	

=== Sport climbing ===
For the Youth Olympic Games, there are two venues that have been or will be used for sport climbing.

Games	Venue	Other sports hosted at venue for those games	Capacity	Ref.
2014 Nanjing (demonstration)	Fishmouth Park	Roller speed skating, Skateboarding, Wushu	Not listed	
2018 Buenos Aires	Parque Mujeres Argentinas	Basketball 3x3, Breaking, Cycling	Not listed	
2026 Dakar				

=== Surfing ===
Surfing is added to 2026 Summer Youth Olympics for the first time.

Games	Venue	Other sports hosted at venue for those games	Capacity	Ref.
2026 Dakar				

=== Swimming ===
For the Youth Olympic Games, there are three venues that have been or will be used for swimming.

Games	Venue	Other sports hosted at venue for those games	Capacity	Ref.
2010 Singapore	Singapore Sports School Swimming Complex	Modern pentathlon	1,800	
2014 Nanjing	Nanjing Olympic Sports Centre Natatorium	Diving, Modern pentathlon	2,500	
2018 Buenos Aires	Youth Olympic Centre Natatorium	Diving, Modern pentathlon	Not listed	
2026 Dakar				

=== Table tennis ===
For the Youth Olympic Games, there are three venues that have been or will be used for table tennis.

Games	Venue	Other sports hosted at venue for those games	Capacity	Ref.
2010 Singapore	Singapore Indoor Stadium	Badminton	5,000	
2014 Nanjing	Wutaishan Gymnasium	None	5,000	
2018 Buenos Aires	Tecnópolis Table Tennis Arena	None	Not listed	
2026 Dakar				

=== Taekwondo ===
For the Youth Olympic Games, there are three venues that have been or will be used for taekwondo.

Games	Venue	Other sports hosted at venue for those games	Capacity	Ref.
2010 Singapore	Suntec International Convention Centre	Boxing, Fencing, Handball, Judo, Wrestling	1,000	
2014 Nanjing	Nanjing International Expo Center	Boxing, Fencing, Modern pentathlon, Weightlifting	1,000	
2018 Buenos Aires	Youth Olympic Centre Oceania Pavilion	Boxing	1,012	
2026 Dakar				

=== Tennis ===
For the Youth Olympic Games, there are three venues that have been or will be used for tennis.

Games	Venue	Other sports hosted at venue for those games	Capacity	Ref.
2010 Singapore	Kallang Tennis Centre	None	2,000	
2014 Nanjing	Chinese Tennis Academy	None	2,000	
2018 Buenos Aires	Buenos Aires Lawn Tennis Club	None	3,400	
2026 Dakar				

=== Triathlon ===
For the Youth Olympic Games, there are three venues that have been or will be used for triathlon.

Games	Venue	Other sports hosted at venue for those games	Capacity	Ref.
2010 Singapore	East Coast Park	None	Not listed	
2014 Nanjing	Xuanwu Lake Park	Triathlon	Not listed	
2018 Buenos Aires	Bosques de Palermo	Cycling	Not listed	
2026 Dakar				

=== Weightlifting ===
For the Youth Olympic Games, there are three venues that have been or will be used for weightlifting.

Games	Venue	Other sports hosted at venue for those games	Capacity	Ref.
2010 Singapore	Toa Payoh Sports Hall	Volleyball	2,000	
2014 Nanjing	Nanjing International Expo Center	Boxing, Fencing, Modern pentathlon, Taekwondo	1,000	
2018 Buenos Aires	Youth Olympic Centre Europe Pavilion	Karate	997	
2026 Dakar				

=== Wrestling ===
For the Youth Olympic Games, there are three venues that have been or will be used for wrestling.

Games	Venue	Other sports hosted at venue for those games	Capacity	Ref.
2010 Singapore	Suntec International Convention Centre	Boxing, Fencing, Handball, Judo, Taekwondo	1,000	
2014 Nanjing	Longjiang Gymnasium	Judo	2,800	
2018 Buenos Aires	Youth Olympic Centre Asia Pavilion	Judo	1,182	
2026 Dakar				

=== Wushu ===
For the Youth Olympic Games, there are one venue that have been used for wushu.

Games	Venue	Other sports hosted at venue for those games	Capacity	Ref.
2014 Nanjing (demonstration)	Fishmouth Park	Skateboarding, Sport climbing, Sport climbing	Not listed	
2026 Dakar				

== Discontinued sports ==
=== Field hockey ===
For the Youth Olympic Games, there are one venue that have been used for field hockey.

Games	Venue	Other sports hosted at venue for those games	Capacity	Ref.
2010 Singapore	Sengkang Hockey Stadium	None	1,000	

=== Football ===
For the Youth Olympic Games, there are three venues that have been used for football.

Games	Venue	Other sports hosted at venue for those games	Capacity	Ref.
2010 Singapore	Jalan Besar Stadium	None	6,000	
2014 Nanjing	Jiangning Sports Center	None	28,500	
2014 Nanjing	Wutaishan Stadium	None	18,000	

=== Handball ===
For the Youth Olympic Games, there are two venues that have been used for handball.

Games	Venue	Other sports hosted at venue for those games	Capacity	Ref.
2010 Singapore	Suntec International Convention Centre	Boxing, Fencing, Judo, Modern pentathlon, Taekwondo, Wrestling	1,500	
2014 Nanjing	Jiangning Sports Center Gymnasium	None	2,000	

=== Roller speed skating ===
For the Youth Olympic Games, there are two venues that have been used for roller speed skating.

Games	Venue	Other sports hosted at venue for those games	Capacity	Ref.
2014 Nanjing (demonstration)	Fishmouth Park	Skateboarding, Sport climbing, Wushu	Not listed	
2018 Buenos Aires	Paseo de la Costa	None	Not listed	

=== Rowing ===
For the Youth Olympic Games, there are three venues that have been used for rowing.

Games	Venue	Other sports hosted at venue for those games	Capacity	Ref.
2010 Singapore	Marina Reservoir	Canoeing	1,000	
2014 Nanjing	Xuanwu Lake Rowing–Canoeing Venue	Canoeing	1,000	
2018 Buenos Aires	Diques Puerto Madero	Canoeing	Not listed	

=== Volleyball ===
For the Youth Olympic Games, there are one venue that have been used for volleyball.

Games	Venue	Other sports hosted at venue for those games	Capacity	Ref.
2010 Singapore	Toa Payoh Sports Hall	Weightlifting	2,000	

== Demonstration sports ==
=== Ekarting ===
For the Youth Olympic Games, there are one venue that have been used for ekarting.

Games	Venue	Other sports hosted at venue for those games	Capacity	Ref.
2018 Buenos Aires	Kartodromo Circuit	None	Not listed	

=== Polo ===
For the Youth Olympic Games, there are one venue that have been used for polo.

Games	Venue	Other sports hosted at venue for those games	Capacity	Ref.
2018 Buenos Aires	Campo Argentino de Polo	None	30,000	

=== Squash ===
For the Youth Olympic Games, there are one venue that have been used for squash.

Games	Venue	Other sports hosted at venue for those games	Capacity	Ref.
2018 Buenos Aires	Tecnópolis Squash Court	None	Not listed	
