= Luge at the 2016 Winter Youth Olympics – Team relay =

Team relay at the II Winter Youth Olympic Games
- Venue: Lillehammer Olympic Bobsleigh and Luge Track
- Dates: 16 February
- Competitors: 39 from 14 nations
- Winning time: 2:52.520

Medalists
1st place, gold medalist(s)		Jessica Tiebel; Paul-Lukas Heider; Hannes Orlamünder / Paul Gubitz	Germany
2nd place, silver medalist(s)		Olesya Mikhaylenko; Evgenii Petrov; Vsevolod Kashkin / Konstantin Korshunov	Russia
3rd place, bronze medalist(s)		Marion Oberhofer; Fabian Malleier; Felix Schwarz / Lukas Gufler	Italy

The team relay luge at the 2016 Winter Youth Olympics took place on 16 February at the Lillehammer Olympic Bobsleigh and Luge Track.

== Results ==
Rank	Bib	Athlete	Country	Women's singles	Men's singles	Doubles	Total	Behind
1st place, gold medalist(s)	13–1; 13–2; 13–3	Jessica Tiebel; Paul-Lukas Heider; Hannes Orlamünder / Paul Gubitz	Germany	56.760	57.737	58.023	2:52.520	–
2nd place, silver medalist(s)	10–1; 10–2; 10–3	Olesya Mikhaylenko; Evgenii Petrov; Vsevolod Kashkin / Konstantin Korshunov	Russia	56.953	57.571	58.184	2:52.708	+0.188
3rd place, bronze medalist(s)	11–1; 11–2; 11–3	Marion Oberhofer; Fabian Malleier; Felix Schwarz / Lukas Gufler	Italy	57.917	57.683	57.440	2:53.040	+0.520
4	12–1; 12–2; 12–3	Brooke Apshkrum; Reid Watts; Matt Riddle / Adam Shippit	Canada	57.147	57.802	58.600	2:53.549	+1.029
5	9–1; 9–2; 9–3	Anda Upīte; Kristers Aparjods; Aksels Tupe / Kaspars Šļahota	Latvia	57.887	57.085	59.715	2:54.687	+2.167
6	4–1; 4–2; 4–3	Mihaela Carmen Manolescu; Theodor Andrei Turea; Vasile Marian Gîtlan / Flavius Ion Crăciun	Romania	58.032	58.462	58.767	2:55.261	+2.741
7	6–1; 6–2; 6–3	Olena Smaha; Ihor Stakhiv; Andriy Lysetskyy /Myroslav Levkovych	Ukraine	57.605	59.202	1:00.121	2:56.928	+4.408
8	7–1; 7–2; 7–3	Katarína Šimoňáková; Richard Gavlas; Tomáš Vaverčák / Matej Zmij	Slovakia	58.232	58.977	59.944	2:57.153	+4.633
9	8–1; 8–2; 8–3	Madeleine Egle; Bastian Schulte; Jakob Schmid / Juri Gatt	Austria	57.176	57.948	1:02.286	2:57.410	+4.890
10	1–1; 1–2; 1–3	Ashley Farquharson; Justin Taylor; Duncan Biles / Alanson Owen	United States	57.750	1:00.090	1:00.020	2:57.860	+5.340
11	2–1; 2–2; 2–3	Nadia Chodorek; Kacper Tarnawski; Artur Zubel / Daniel Rola	Poland	59.415	59.302	1:00.041	2:58.758	+6.238
12	5–1; 5–2; 5–3	Anastassiya Bogacheva; Lucas Gebauer-Barrett; Roman Yefremov / Denis Tatyanchenko	Mixed-NOCs	59.432	59.536	1:02.099	3:01.067	+8.547
	3–1; 3–2; 3–3	Michaela Maršíková; Michael Lejsek; Filip Vejdělek / Zdeněk Pěkný	Czech Republic				DSQ	
