= Estonia at the Youth Olympics =

- IOC code: EST
- NOC: Estonian Olympic Committee
- Website: www.eok.ee (in Estonian)
- Medals Ranked 73rd: Gold 1 Silver 2 Bronze 1 Total 4

Summer appearances
- 2010; 2014; 2018; 2026

Winter appearances
- 2012; 2016; 2020; 2024

Estonia has participated at the Youth Olympic Games since the inaugural 2010 Games and every edition after that.

== Summer Games ==
Games	Athletes	Gold	Silver	Bronze	Total	Rank
2010 Singapore	8	0	0	0	0	–
(China) 2014 Nanjing	17	0	0	0	0	–
(Argentina) 2018 Buenos Aires	23	0	0	1	1	83
Total		0	0	1	1	108

=== Medals by summer sport ===
Sport	Gold	Silver	Bronze	Total
Rowing	0	0	1	1
Totals (1 entries)	0	0	1	1

== Winter Games ==
Games	Athletes	Gold	Silver	Bronze	Total	Rank
(Austria) 2012 Innsbruck	17	0	2	0	2	21st
(Norway) 2016 Lillehammer	17	0	0	0	0	–
(Switzerland) 2020 Lausanne	25	1	0	0	1	20th
Total		1	2	0	3	23rd

=== Medals by winter sport ===
Sport	Gold	Silver	Bronze	Total
Freestyle skiing	1	0	0	1
Biathlon	0	2	0	2
Totals (2 entries)	1	2	0	3

== List of medalists ==
=== Summer Games ===
Medal	Name	Games	Sport	Event
Bronze	Greta Jaanson	(Argentina) 2018 Buenos Aires	Rowing	Girls' single sculls

==== Mixed-NOCs medals ====
Medal	Name	Games	Sport	Event
Silver	Adelina Beljajeva	(Argentina) 2018 Buenos Aires	Gymnastics	Mixed multi-discipline team

=== Winter Games ===
Medal	Name	Games	Sport	Event
Gold	Kelly Sildaru	(Switzerland) 2020 Lausanne	Freestyle skiing	Girls' slopestyle
Silver	Rene Zahkna	(Austria) 2012 Innsbruck	Biathlon	Boys' sprint
Silver	Rene Zahkna	(Austria) 2012 Innsbruck	Biathlon	Boys' pursuit

==== Mixed-NOCs medals ====
Medal	Name	Games	Sport	Event
Gold	Arlet Levandi	(Switzerland) 2020 Lausanne	Figure skating	Team trophy
Gold	Marek Potšinok	(Switzerland) 2020 Lausanne	Ice hockey	Boys' 3x3 mixed tournament
Bronze	Erik Potšinok	(Switzerland) 2020 Lausanne	Ice hockey	Boys' 3x3 mixed tournament

== Competitors ==
Summer Games

Sport	2010	2014	2018	Total
Archery			1	1
Athletics	2	5	6	13
Badminton		1		1
Basketball		4	8	12
Cycling		2		2
Gymnastics			1	1
Judo	1	1		2
Karate	—N/a	—N/a	1	1
Rowing	1		1	2
Sailing	1	1		1
Swimming	3	3	4	10
Wrestling			1	1
Total	8	17	23	48

Winter Games

Sport	2012	2016	2020	Total
Alpine skiing	2	1	1	4
Biathlon	4	4	6	14
Cross-country skiing	2	2	4	8
Curling	4	4	4	12
Figure skating	3	2	2	7
Freestyle skiing			1	1
Ice hockey			3	3
Nordic combined	1	1	3*	5
Ski jumping	1	1	2*	4
Speed skating		2		2
Total	17	17	25	59

*One athlete competed in both Nordic combined and ski jumping

== Flag bearers ==
These are the Estonian flag bearers in the opening ceremony:

#	Games	Season	Flag bearer	Sport
1	2010 Singapore	Summer	Pjotr Degtjarjov	Swimming
2	2012 Innsbruck	Winter	Rene Zahkna	Biathlon
3	2014 Nanjing	Summer	Hans-Christian Hausenberg	Athletics
4	2016 Lillehammer	Winter	Anneliis Viilukas	Biathlon
5	2018 Buenos Aires	Summer	Eerik Haamer	Athletics
6	2020 Lausanne	Winter	Lisbeth Liiv	Biathlon

== See also ==
- Estonia at the Olympics
- Estonia at the Paralympics
- Estonia at the European Youth Olympic Festival
