= Wrestling at the Summer Youth Olympics =

Wrestling has featured as a sport at the Youth Olympic Summer Games since its first edition in 2010. The Youth Olympic Games are multi-sport event and the games are held every four years just like the Olympic Games. In 2026, beach wrestling was held instead of freestyle and greco-roman wrestling.

== Editions ==
Games	Year	Events	Best Nation
1	2010	14 (10M+4W)	Azerbaijan
2	2014	14 (10M+4W)	Russia
3	2018	15 (10M+5W)	Iran
4	2026	8 (4M+4W)	Senegal

== Medal table ==
As of the 2018 Summer Youth Olympics.

Rank	Nation	Gold	Silver	Bronze	Total
1	Russia	9	1	3	13
2	Azerbaijan	8	3	1	12
3	Japan	6	0	2	8
4	United States	2	4	0	6
5	Iran	2	3	3	8
6	Uzbekistan	2	1	4	7
7	Kazakhstan	2	0	2	4
8	North Korea	2	0	0	2
9	Turkey	1	4	3	8
10	Georgia	1	3	2	6
11	Moldova	1	2	1	4
12	China	1	2	0	3
12	Cuba	1	2	0	3
14	Kyrgyzstan	1	1	1	3
14	Mongolia	1	1	1	3
16	Canada	1	0	0	1
16	Norway	1	0	0	1
16	Sweden	1	0	0	1
19	Ukraine	0	2	4	6
20	India	0	2	1	3
21	Argentina	0	2	0	2
22	Armenia	0	1	4	5
23	Egypt	0	1	3	4
24	Bulgaria	0	1	1	2
25	Algeria	0	1	0	1
25	Ecuador	0	1	0	1
25	Hungary	0	1	0	1
25	South Korea	0	1	0	1
25	Tajikistan	0	1	0	1
25	Venezuela	0	1	0	1
31	Belarus	0	0	1	1
31	Finland	0	0	1	1
31	France	0	0	1	1
31	Germany	0	0	1	1
31	Mexico	0	0	1	1
31	Pakistan	0	0	1	1
31	Poland	0	0	1	1
Totals (37 entries)		43	42	43	128

- Nurbek Hakkulov of Uzbekistan originally finished second, but in October 2010, it was announced that he tested positive for diuretic Furosemide.
