= Germany at the 2016 Winter Youth Olympics =

- IOC code: GER
- NOC: Deutscher Olympischer Sportbund
- Website: www.dosb.de

in Lillehammer
- Competitors: 44 in 14 sports
- Medals Ranked 4th: Gold 7 Silver 7 Bronze 8 Total 22

Winter Youth Olympics appearances
- 2012; 2016; 2020; 2024

Germany competed at the 2016 Winter Youth Olympics in Lillehammer, Norway from 12 to 21 February 2016.

== Medalists ==
| Medal | Name | Sport | Event | Date |
|---|---|---|---|---|
| Gold | Juliane Frühwirt | Biathlon | Girls' sprint | 14 February |
| Gold | Jessica Tiebel; Paul-Lukas Heider; Hannes Orlamünder; Paul Gubitz | Luge | Mixed team relay | 16 February |
| Gold | Jana Fischer; Celia Funkler; Sebastian Pietrzykowski; Cornel Renn | Snowboarding | Team snowboard ski cross | 16 February |
| Gold | Tim Kopp | Nordic combined | Normal hill/5 km | 16 February |
| Gold | Lucia Rispler | Alpine skiing | Parallel mixed team | 20 February |
| Gold | Jonas Stockinger | Alpine skiing | Parallel mixed team | 20 February |
| Gold | Laura Nolte | Bobsleigh | Girls' monobob | 20 February |
| Gold | Jonas Jannusch | Bobsleigh | Boys' monobob | 20 February |
| Silver | Paul-Lukas Heider | Luge | Boys' singles | 14 February |
| Silver | Jessica Tiebel | Luge | Girls' singles | 15 February |
| Silver | Hannes Orlamünder; Paul Gubitz | Luge | Doubles | 15 February |
| Silver | Katrin Hirtl-Stanggassinger | Alpine skiing | Girls' giant slalom | 16 February |
| Silver | Agnes Reisch; Tim Kopp; Jonathan Siegel | Ski jumping | Team competition | 18 February |
| Silver | Hannah Neise | Skeleton | Girls' | 19 February |
| Silver | Juliane Frühwirt; Franziska Pfnür; Simon Groß; Danilo Riethmüller | Biathlon | Mixed relay | 21 February |
| Bronze | Anna Seidel | Short track | Girls' 1000 m | 14 February |
| Bronze | Kartrin Hirtl-Stanggassinger | Alpine skiing | Girls' combined | 14 February |
| Bronze | Sebastian Pietrzykowski | Snowboarding | Boys' snowboard cross | 15 February |
| Bronze | Jonathan Siegel | Ski jumping | Boys' normal hill | 16 February |
| Bronze | Anton Grammel | Alpine skiing | Boys' giant slalom | 17 February |
| Bronze | Erik Betzold | Ice hockey | Boys' individual skills challenge | 18 February |
| Bronze | Robin Schneider | Skeleton | Boys' | 19 February |
| Bronze | Agnes Reisch; Tim Kopp; Jonathan Siegel; Anna-Maria Dietze; Philipp Unger | Nordic combined | Nordic mixed team | 19 February |

=== Medalists in mixed NOCs events ===
| Medal | Name | Sport | Event | Date |
|---|---|---|---|---|
| Bronze | Ole Jeske | Speed skating | Mixed team sprint | 17 February |

== Alpine skiing ==
Boys

| Athlete | Event | Run 1 | | Run 2 | | Total | |
| Athlete | Event | Time | Rank | Time | Rank | Time | Rank |
|---|---|---|---|---|---|---|---|
| Anton Grammel | Slalom | DNF | | did not advance | | | |
| Anton Grammel | Giant slalom | 1:18.71 | 4 | 1:17.83 | 2 | 2:36.54 | 3rd place, bronze medalist(s) |
| Anton Grammel | Super-G | —N/a | | | | 1:13.36 | 25 |
| Anton Grammel | Combined | 1:13.26 | 13 | 43.06 | 17 | 1:56.32 | 14 |
| Jonas Stockinger | Slalom | 50.78 | 6 | 50.72 | 11 | 1:41.50 | 9 |
| Jonas Stockinger | Super-G | —N/a | | | | DNF | |
| Jonas Stockinger | Combined | 1:14.27 | 25 | did not start | | | |

Girls

| Athlete | Event | Run 1 | | Run 2 | | Total | |
| Athlete | Event | Time | Rank | Time | Rank | Time | Rank |
|---|---|---|---|---|---|---|---|
| Katrin Hirtl-Stanggassinger | Slalom | 55.84 | 8 | 50.93 | 4 | 1:46.77 | 6 |
| Katrin Hirtl-Stanggassinger | Giant slalom | 1:17.80 | 1 | 1:15.54 | 4 | 2:33.34 | 2nd place, silver medalist(s) |
| Katrin Hirtl-Stanggassinger | Super-G | —N/a | | | | 1:13.61 | 5 |
| Katrin Hirtl-Stanggassinger | Combined | 1:14.13 | 3 | 43.12 | 4 | 1:57.25 | 3rd place, bronze medalist(s) |
| Lucia Rispler | Slalom | 55.62 | 7 | 51.21 | 5 | 1:46.83 | 8 |
| Lucia Rispler | Giant slalom | 1:19.68 | 6 | 1:16.00 | 7 | 2:35.68 | 6 |
| Lucia Rispler | Super-G | —N/a | | | | 1:15.17 | 13 |
| Lucia Rispler | Combined | 1:14.97 | 7 | did not finish | | | |

Parallel mixed team

| Athletes | Event | Round of 16 | Quarterfinals | Semifinals | Final / BM | |
| Athletes | Event | Opposition Score | Opposition Score | Opposition Score | Opposition Score | Rank |
|---|---|---|---|---|---|---|
| Lucia Rispler; Jonas Stockinger | Parallel mixed team | Sweden; W 2^{+} – 2 | Switzerland; W 2^{+} – 2 | Finland; W 2^{+} – 2 | Russia; W 3 – 1 | 1st place, gold medalist(s) |

== Biathlon ==
Boys

| Athlete | Event | Time | Misses | Rank |
|---|---|---|---|---|
| Simon Groß | Sprint | 20:49.1 | 3 | 18 |
| Simon Groß | Pursuit | 32:15.5 | 4 | 21 |
| Danilo Riethmüller | Sprint | 19:50.1 | 3 | 7 |
| Danilo Riethmüller | Pursuit | 30:30.3 | 6 | 6 |

Girls

| Athlete | Event | Time | Misses | Rank |
|---|---|---|---|---|
| Juliane Frühwirt | Sprint | 18:23.5 | 0 | 1st place, gold medalist(s) |
| Juliane Frühwirt | Pursuit | 27:09.5 | 6 | 12 |
| Franziska Pfnür | Sprint | 21:02.0 | 4 | 33 |
| Franziska Pfnür | Pursuit | 27:59.8 | 1 | 20 |

Mixed

| Athletes | Event | Time | Misses | Rank |
|---|---|---|---|---|
| Juliane Frühwirt; Danilo Riethmüller | Single mixed relay | 42:05.6 | 3+12 | 5 |
| Juliane Frühwirt; Franziska Pfnür; Simon Groß; Danilo Riethmüller | Mixed relay | 1:18:43.2 | 0+9 | 2nd place, silver medalist(s) |

== Bobsleigh ==
| Athlete | Event | Run 1 | | Run 2 | | Total | |
| Athlete | Event | Time | Rank | Time | Rank | Time | Rank |
|---|---|---|---|---|---|---|---|
| Jonas Jannusch | Boys' | 57.15 | 2 | 57.14 | 2 | 1:54.29 | 1st place, gold medalist(s) |
| Vivian Bierbaum | Girls' | 59.07 | 6 | 59.47 | 9 | 1:58.54 | 6 |
| Laura Nolte | Girls' | 58.68 | 2 | 58.73 | 1 | 1:57.41 | 1st place, gold medalist(s) |

== Cross-country skiing ==
Boys

| Athlete | Event | Qualification | | Quarterfinal | | Semifinal | | Final | |
| Athlete | Event | Time | Rank | Time | Rank | Time | Rank | Time | Rank |
|---|---|---|---|---|---|---|---|---|---|
| Chris Sauerbrey | 10 km freestyle | —N/a | | | | | | 25:59.3 | 24 |
| Chris Sauerbrey | Classical sprint | 3:06.03 | 11 Q | 3:04.32 | 3 | did not advance | | | |
| Chris Sauerbrey | Cross-country cross | 3:14.51 | 14 Q | —N/a | | 3:14.30 | 5 | did not advance | |
| Philipp Unger | 10 km freestyle | —N/a | | | | | | 25:35.1 | 17 |
| Philipp Unger | Classical sprint | 3:08.37 | 18 Q | 3:07.80 | 3 | did not advance | | | |
| Philipp Unger | Cross-country cross | 3:15.79 | 17 Q | —N/a | | 3:15.97 | 6 | did not advance | |

Girls

| Athlete | Event | Qualification | | Quarterfinal | | Semifinal | | Final | |
| Athlete | Event | Time | Rank | Time | Rank | Time | Rank | Time | Rank |
|---|---|---|---|---|---|---|---|---|---|
| Anna-Maria Dietze | 5 km freestyle | —N/a | | | | | | 14:00.3 | 13 |
| Anna-Maria Dietze | Classical sprint | 3:36.34 | 10 Q | 3:30.64 | 2 Q | 3:30.58 | 5 | did not advance | |
| Anna-Maria Dietze | Cross-country cross | 3:34.48 | 4 Q | —N/a | | 3:36.73 | 2 Q | 3:29.72 | 4 |
| Celine Mayer | 5 km freestyle | —N/a | | | | | | 14:29.8 | 23 |
| Celine Mayer | Classical sprint | 3:42.90 | 22 Q | 3:37.23 | 5 | did not advance | | | |
| Celine Mayer | Cross-country cross | 4:00.39 | 29 Q | —N/a | | 3:49.17 | 9 | did not advance | |

== Figure skating ==
Singles

| Athlete | Event | SP | | FS | | Total | |
| Athlete | Event | Points | Rank | Points | Rank | Points | Rank |
|---|---|---|---|---|---|---|---|
| Annika Hocke | Girls' singles | 41.52 | 15 | 83.68 | 10 | 125.20 | 11 |

Couples

| Athletes | Event | SP/SD | | FS/FD | | Total | |
| Athletes | Event | Points | Rank | Points | Rank | Points | Rank |
|---|---|---|---|---|---|---|---|
| Charise Matthaei; Maximilian Pfisterer | Ice dancing | 39.29 | 11 | 57.11 | 12 | 96.40 | 11 |

Mixed NOC team trophy

| Athletes | Event | Free skate/Free dance | | | | | |
| Athletes | Event | Ice dance | Pairs | Girls | Boys | Total | |
| Athletes | Event | Points Team points | Points Team points | Points Team points | Points Team points | Points | Rank |
|---|---|---|---|---|---|---|---|
| Team Determination; Francesca Righi / Pietro Papetti (ITA); Alina Ustimkina / Nikita Volodin (RUS); Annika Hocke (GER); Adam Siao Him Fa (FRA) | Team trophy | 53.70; 1 | 100.98; 6 | 82.41; 3 | 97.80; 4 | 14 | 8 |

== Freestyle skiing ==
Ski cross

| Athlete | Event | Qualification | | Group heats | | Semifinal | Final |
| Athlete | Event | Time | Rank | Points | Rank | Position | Position |
|---|---|---|---|---|---|---|---|
| Cornel Renn | Boys' ski cross | 42.91 | 2 Q | 18 | 3 Q | 3 FB | 7 |
| Celia Funkler | Girls' ski cross | 47.22 | 7 | 15 | 5 Q | 2 FA | 4 |

Slopestyle

| Athlete | Event | Final | | | |
| Athlete | Event | Run 1 | Run 2 | Best | Rank |
|---|---|---|---|---|---|
| Moritz Neuhauser | Boys' slopestyle | 8.60 | 56.20 | 56.20 | 12 |

== Ice hockey ==
| Athlete | Event | Qualification | | Final | |
| Athlete | Event | Points | Rank | Points | Rank |
|---|---|---|---|---|---|
| Erik Betzold | Boys' individual skills challenge | 18 | 3 Q | 11 | 3rd place, bronze medalist(s) |
| Tabea Botthof | Girls' individual skills challenge | 14 | 6 Q | 7 | 8 |

== Luge ==
Individual sleds

| Athlete | Event | Run 1 | | Run 2 | | Total | |
| Athlete | Event | Time | Rank | Time | Rank | Time | Rank |
|---|---|---|---|---|---|---|---|
| Paul-Lukas Heider | Boys | 47.999 | 3 | 47.956 | 4 | 1:35.955 | 2nd place, silver medalist(s) |
| Tina Müller | Girls | 53.851 | 11 | 53.091 | 3 | 1:46.942 | 8 |
| Jessica Tiebel | Girls | 53.106 | 1 | 52.991 | 2 | 1:46.097 | 2nd place, silver medalist(s) |
| Paul Gubitz; Hannes Orlamünder | Doubles | 52.599 | 2 | 52.515 | 3 | 1:45.114 | 2nd place, silver medalist(s) |

Mixed team relay

| Athlete | Event | Girls | | Boys | | Doubles | | Total | |
| Athlete | Event | Time | Rank | Time | Rank | Time | Rank | Time | Rank |
|---|---|---|---|---|---|---|---|---|---|
| Jessica Tiebel; Paul-Lukas Heider; Hannes Orlamünder; Paul Gubitz | Team relay | 56.760 | 1 | 57.737 | 4 | 58.023 | 2 | 2:52.520 | 1st place, gold medalist(s) |

== Nordic combined ==
Individual

| Athlete | Event | Ski jumping | | | | Cross-country | |
| Athlete | Event | Distance | Points | Rank | Deficit | Time | Rank |
|---|---|---|---|---|---|---|---|
| Tim Kopp | Normal hill/5 km | 99.5 | 131.8 | 1 | 0:00 | 13:31.4 | 1st place, gold medalist(s) |

Nordic mixed team

| Athlete | Event | Ski jumping | | | Cross-country | |
| Athlete | Event | Points | Rank | Deficit | Time | Rank |
|---|---|---|---|---|---|---|
| Agnes Reisch; Tim Kopp; Jonathan Siegel; Anna-Maria Dietze; Philipp Unger | Nordic mixed team | 356.1 | 2 | 0:26 | 26:38.4 | 3rd place, bronze medalist(s) |

== Skeleton ==
| Athlete | Event | Run 1 | | Run 2 | | Total | |
| Athlete | Event | Time | Rank | Time | Rank | Time | Rank |
|---|---|---|---|---|---|---|---|
| Florian Heinrich | Boys | 54.32 | 5 | 54.28 | 5 | 1:48.60 | 5 |
| Robin Schneider | Boys | 54.02 | 3 | 54.08 | 3 | 1:48.10 | 3rd place, bronze medalist(s) |
| Hannah Neise | Girls | 55.43 | 2 | 55.76 | 2 | 1:51.19 | 2nd place, silver medalist(s) |

== Ski jumping ==
Individual

| Athlete | Event | First round | | | Final | | | Total | |
| Athlete | Event | Distance | Points | Rank | Distance | Points | Rank | Points | Rank |
|---|---|---|---|---|---|---|---|---|---|
| Jonathan Siegel | Boys' normal hill | 98.5 | 123.1 | 3 | 90.5 | 112.9 | 5 | 236.0 | 3rd place, bronze medalist(s) |
| Agnes Reisch | Girls' normal hill | 93.0 | 112.2 | 4 | 92.0 | 107.2 | 4 | 219.4 | 4 |

Team

| Athlete | Event | First round | | Final | | Total | |
| Athlete | Event | Points | Rank | Points | Rank | Points | Rank |
|---|---|---|---|---|---|---|---|
| Agnes Reisch; Tim Kopp; Jonathan Siegel | Team competition | 334.5 | 3 | 341.0 | 2 | 675.5 | 2nd place, silver medalist(s) |

== Short track speed skating ==
Boys

| Athlete | Event | Quarterfinal | | Semifinal | | Final | |
| Athlete | Event | Time | Rank | Time | Rank | Time | Rank |
|---|---|---|---|---|---|---|---|
| Moritz Kreuseler | 500 m | 45.105 | 4 SC/D | 44.974 | 3 FD | 45.787 | 15 |
| Moritz Kreuseler | 1000 m | 1:36.354 | 3 SC/D | 1:42.414 | 3 FD | 1:43.506 | 12 |

Girls

| Athlete | Event | Quarterfinal | | Semifinal | | Final | |
| Athlete | Event | Time | Rank | Time | Rank | Time | Rank |
|---|---|---|---|---|---|---|---|
| Anna Seidel | 500 m | No Time | 3 SC/D | 46.779 | 1 FC | 45.857 | 8 |
| Anna Seidel | 1000 m | 1:36.200 | 1 SA/B | 1:36.344 | 1 FA | 1:34.323 | 3rd place, bronze medalist(s) |

Mixed team relay

| Athlete | Event | Semifinal | | Final | |
| Athlete | Event | Time | Rank | Time | Rank |
|---|---|---|---|---|---|
| Team E Gloria Ioriatti (ITA); Anna Seidel (GER); Aaron Heo (USA); Hong Kyung-hwan (KOR) | Mixed team relay | 4:16.056 | 2 FA | PEN | |
| Team H Shione Kaminaga (JPN); Gioya Lancee (NED); Moritz Kreuseler (GER); Ma Wei (CHN) | Mixed team relay | 4:27.607 | 3 FB | 4:22.198 | 4 |

Qualification Legend: FA=Final A (medal); FB=Final B (non-medal); FC=Final C (non-medal); FD=Final D (non-medal); SA/B=Semifinals A/B; SC/D=Semifinals C/D; ADV=Advanced to Next Round; PEN=Penalized

== Snowboarding ==
Halfpipe

| Athlete | Event | Final | | | | |
| Athlete | Event | Run 1 | Run 2 | Run 3 | Best | Rank |
|---|---|---|---|---|---|---|
| Christoph Lechner | Boys' halfpipe | 35.00 | 35.75 | 35.00 | 35.75 | 16 |

Snowboard cross

| Athlete | Event | Qualification | | Group heats | | Semifinal | Final |
| Athlete | Event | Time | Rank | Points | Rank | Position | Position |
|---|---|---|---|---|---|---|---|
| Sebastian Pietrzykowski | Boys' snowboard cross | 47.90 | 1 Q | 18 | 2 Q | 1 FA | 3rd place, bronze medalist(s) |
| Jana Fischer | Girls' snowboard cross | 51.27 | 4 Q | 15 | 4 Q | 4 FB | 6 |

Slopestyle

| Athlete | Event | Final | | | |
| Athlete | Event | Run 1 | Run 2 | Best | Rank |
|---|---|---|---|---|---|
| Christoph Lechner | Boys' slopestyle | 23.50 | 53.00 | 53.00 | 13 |

Snowboard and ski cross relay

| Athlete | Event | Quarterfinal | Semifinal | Final |
| Athlete | Event | Position | Position | Position |
|---|---|---|---|---|
| Jana Fischer; Celia Funkler; Sebastian Pietrzykowski; Cornel Renn | Team snowboard ski cross | 1 Q | 1 FA | 1st place, gold medalist(s) |

Qualification legend: FA – Qualify to medal round; FB – Qualify to consolation round

== Speed skating ==
Boys

| Athlete | Event | Race 1 | | Race 2 | | Final | |
| Athlete | Event | Time | Rank | Time | Rank | Time | Rank |
|---|---|---|---|---|---|---|---|
| Ole Jeske | 500 m | 38.26 | 16 | 38.03 | 18 | 76.30 | 16 |
| Ole Jeske | 1500 m | —N/a | | | | 1:59.78 | 23 |
| Ole Jeske | Mass start | —N/a | | | | 3 pts | 5 |
| Lukas Mann | 500 m | 39.38 | 25 | 39.51 | 25 | 78.90 | 25 |
| Lukas Mann | 1500 m | —N/a | | | | 1:59.99 | 25 |
| Lukas Mann | Mass start | —N/a | | | | 1 pts | 6 |

Girls

| Athlete | Event | Race 1 | | Race 2 | | Final | |
| Athlete | Event | Time | Rank | Time | Rank | Time | Rank |
|---|---|---|---|---|---|---|---|
| Pia-Leonie Kirsakal | 500 m | 42.64 | 19 | 42.66 | 20 | 85.30 | 19 |
| Lea Scholz | 500 m | 41.84 | 15 | 41.92 | 16 | 83.77 | 15 |
| Lea Scholz | 1500 m | —N/a | | | | 2:10.13 | 12 |
| Lea Scholz | Mass start | —N/a | | | | Overtime | 23 |

Mixed team sprint

| Athletes | Event | Final | |
| Athletes | Event | Time | Rank |
|---|---|---|---|
| Team 10; Chiara Cristelli (ITA); Mihaela Hogas (ROU); Ole Jeske (GER); Allan Johansson (NOR) | Mixed team sprint | 1:58.87 | 3rd place, bronze medalist(s) |
| Team 12; Lea Scholz (GER); Yauheniya Varabyova (BLR); Daichi Horikawa (JPN); Lukas Mann (GER) | Mixed team sprint | 1:58.95 | 4 |

== See also ==
- Germany at the 2016 Summer Olympics
