= Luge at the 2016 Winter Youth Olympics – Boys' singles =

Boys' singles at the II Winter Youth Olympic Games
- Venue: Lillehammer Olympic Bobsleigh and Luge Track
- Dates: 14 February
- Competitors: 22 from 21 nations
- Winning time: 1:35.309

Medalists
1st place, gold medalist(s)		Kristers Aparjods	Latvia
2nd place, silver medalist(s)		Paul-Lukas Heider	Germany
3rd place, bronze medalist(s)		Reid Watts	Canada

The boys' singles luge at the 2016 Winter Youth Olympics took place on 14 February at the Lillehammer Olympic Bobsleigh and Luge Track.

== Results ==
Rank	Bib	Athlete	Country	Run 1	Rank 1	Run 2	Rank 2	Total	Behind
1st place, gold medalist(s)	7	Kristers Aparjods	Latvia	47.691	1	47.618	1	1:35.309	–
2nd place, silver medalist(s)	8	Paul-Lukas Heider	Germany	47.999	3	47.956	4	1:35.955	+0.646
3rd place, bronze medalist(s)	12	Reid Watts	Canada	48.086	5	47.908	2	1:35.994	+0.685
4	2	Bastian Schulte	Austria	48.125	7	47.924	3	1:36.049	+0.740
5	9	Fabian Malleier	Italy	48.082	4	48.037	5	1:36.119	+0.810
6	5	Yevgeny Petrov	Russia	47.979	2	48.177	8	1:36.156	+0.847
7	10	Ivan Nagler	Italy	48.105	6	48.139	6	1:36.244	+0.935
8	13	Aleksander Melås	Norway	48.239	8	48.150	7	1:36.389	+1.080
9	21	Leonard Cepoi	Moldova	48.656	9	48.580	9	1:37.236	+1.927
10	11	Lucas Gebauer-Barrett	Great Britain	48.821	11	48.650	10	1:37.471	+2.162
11	3	Lasha Peradze	Georgia	48.721	10	48.786	13	1:37.507	+2.198
12	22	Svante Kohala	Sweden	48.999	15	48.677	11	1:37.676	+2.367
13	4	Ihor Stakhiv	Ukraine	48.964	14	48.771	12	1:37.735	+2.426
14	1	Richard Gavlas	Slovakia	48.895	12	48.949	14	1:37.844	+2.535
15	16	Justin Taylor	United States	48.908	13	49.248	16	1:38.156	+2.847
16	19	Adrien Maitre	France	49.826	17	49.096	15	1:38.922	+3.613
17	20	Michael Lejsek	Czech Republic	49.676	16	49.992	18	1:39.668	+4.359
18	14	Chiang Chun-hung	Chinese Taipei	49.998	18	50.624	19	1:40.622	+5.313
19	18	Cengizhan Kaplan	Turkey	50.410	19	51.378	20	1:41.788	+6.479
20	17	Kacper Tarnawski	Poland	58.299	20	49.746	17	1:48.045	+12.736
	15	Ayduan Rizov	Bulgaria	DNF					
	6	Andrei Turea	Romania	DNF					
