= Konstantin Korshunov =

Russian luger (born 1998)

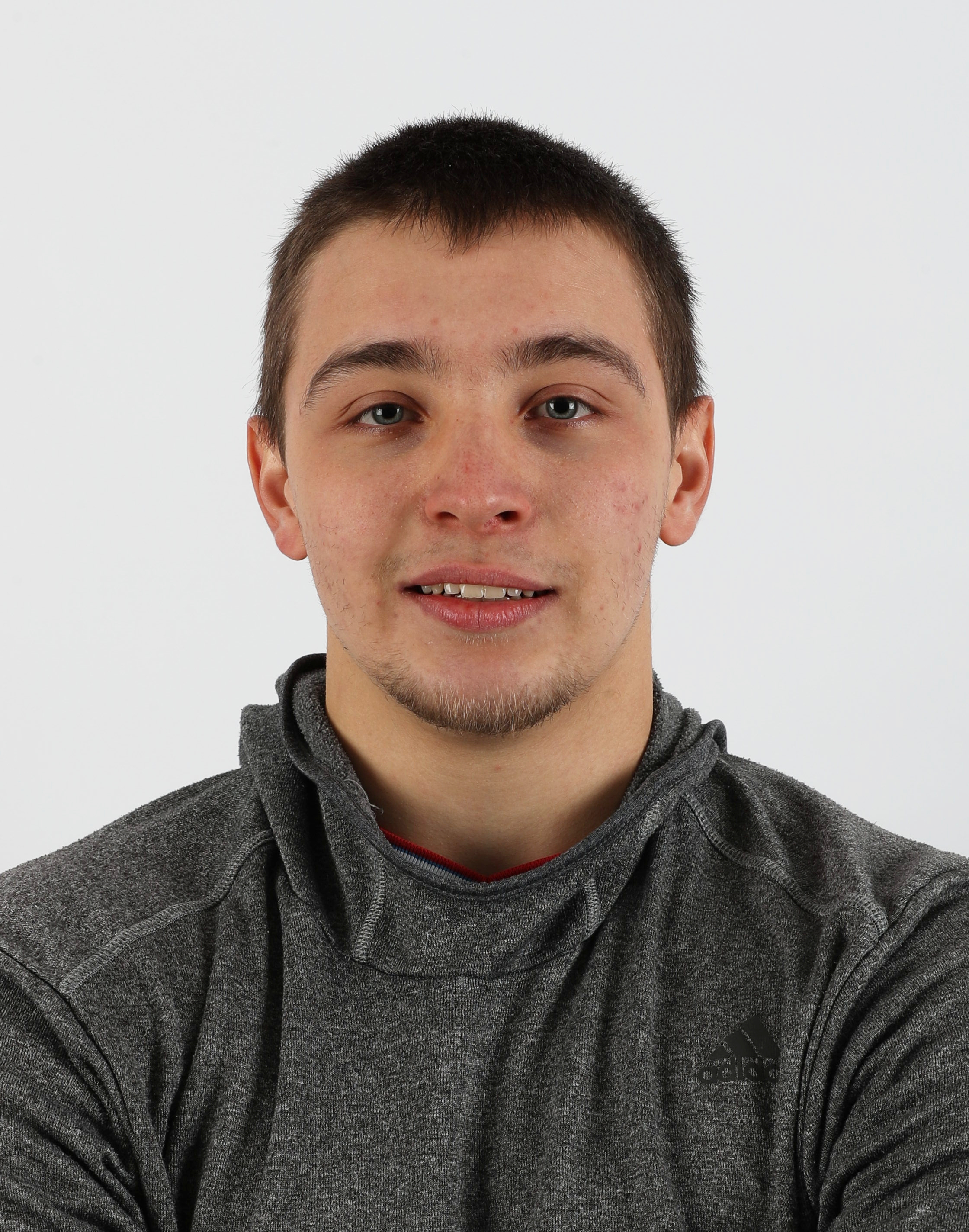
- Konstantin Korshunov in 2018

Personal information
- Born: 8 July 1998 (age 27)

Sport
- Country: Russia
- Sport: Luge
- Event: Doubles
Medal record
Men's luge
Representing Russia
European Championships
Gold medal – first place	2021 Sigulda	Mixed team
Winter Youth Olympic Games
Silver medal – second place	2016 Lillehammer	Mixed team
Bronze medal – third place	2016 Lillehammer	Doubles

Konstantin Korshunov (born 8 July 1998) is a Russian luger. He won the gold medal in the team relay event at the 2021 FIL European Luge Championships held in Sigulda, Latvia.

In 2016, he won the bronze medal in the doubles event at the Winter Youth Olympics held in Lillehammer, Norway. He also won the silver medal in the team relay event.
