= 2021 FIL European Luge Championships – Team relay =

Team relay at the 2021 FIL European Luge Championships
- Venue: Sigulda bobsleigh, luge, and skeleton track
- Location: Sigulda, Latvia
- Dates: 10 January
- Winning time: 2:12.833

Medalists
gold medal	Tatiana Ivanova; Semen Pavlichenko; Vsevolod Kashkin; Konstantin Korshunov	Russia
silver medal	Elīza Tiruma; Artūrs Dārznieks; Andris Šics; Juris Šics	Latvia
bronze medal	Natalie Geisenberger; Felix Loch; Tobias Wendl; Tobias Arlt	Germany

The team relay competition at the 2021 FIL European Luge Championships was held on 10 January 2021.

== Results ==
The event was started at 13:56.

Rank	Bib	Athlete	Country	Women's singles	Men's singles	Doubles	Total	Behind
1st place, gold medalist(s)	8–1; 8–2; 8–3	Tatiana Ivanova; Semen Pavlichenko; Vsevolod Kashkin / Konstantin Korshunov	Russia	43.103	44.529	45.201	2:12.833 TR	
2nd place, silver medalist(s)	7–1; 7–2; 7–3	Elīza Tiruma; Artūrs Dārznieks; Andris Šics / Juris Šics	Latvia	43.295	44.745	44.960	2:13.000	+0.167
3rd place, bronze medalist(s)	10–1; 10–2; 10–3	Natalie Geisenberger; Felix Loch; Tobias Wendl / Tobias Arlt	Germany	43.406	44.598	45.018	2:13.022	+0.189
4	6–1; 6–2; 6–3	Andrea Vötter; Dominik Fischnaller; Ludwig Rieder / Patrick Rastner	Italy	43.477	44.593	45.579	2:13.649	+0.816
5	2–1; 2–2; 2–3	Katarína Šimoňáková; Jozef Ninis; Tomáš Vaverčák / Matej Zmij	Slovakia	44.039	45.128	45.694	2:14.861	+2.028
6	5–1; 5–2; 5–3	Olena Stetskiv; Andriy Mandziy; Ihor Stakhiv / Andrii Lysetskyi	Ukraine	43.794	45.171	46.128	2:15.093	+2.260
7	3–1; 3–2; 3–3	Klaudia Domaradzka; Mateusz Sochowicz; Wojciech Chmielewski / Jakub Kowalewski	Poland	45.270	44.955	45.192	2:15.417	+2.584
	9–1; 9–2; 9–3	Madeleine Egle; Nico Gleirscher; Thomas Steu / Lorenz Koller	Austria	Disqualified				
