= Bobsleigh at the 2016 Winter Youth Olympics – Girls' monobob =

Girls' monobob at the II Winter Youth Olympic Games
- Venue: Lillehammer Olympic Bobsleigh and Luge Track
- Date: 20 February
- Competitors: 15 from 9 nations
- Winning time: 1:57.41

Medalists
1st place, gold medalist(s)		Laura Nolte	Germany
2nd place, silver medalist(s)		Mercedes Schulte	Austria
3rd place, bronze medalist(s)		Kelsea Purchall	Great Britain

The girls' monobob competition of the bobsleigh events at the 2016 Winter Youth Olympics was held at the Lillehammer Olympic Bobsleigh and Luge Track, on 20 February. 15 athletes from 9 countries took part in this event.

== Results ==
The race was started at 10:00.

Rank	Start No.	Athlete	Country	Run 1	Rank 1	Run 2	Rank 2	Total	Behind
1st place, gold medalist(s)	14	Laura Nolte	Germany	58.68	2	58.73	1	1:57.41	
2nd place, silver medalist(s)	9	Mercedes Schulte	Austria	58.66	1	58.99	4	1:57.65	+0.24
3rd place, bronze medalist(s)	8	Kelsea Purchall	Great Britain	58.70	4	58.97	3	1:57.67	+0.26
4	12	Annabel Chaffey	Great Britain	58.68	2	59.14	5	1:57.82	+0.41
5	2	Aimee Davey	Great Britain	58.94	5	58.94	2	1:57.88	+0.47
6	4	Vivian Bierbaum	Germany	59.07	6	59.47	9	1:58.54	+1.13
7	15	Valentina Bologova	Russia	59.25	7	59.43	7	1:58.68	+1.27
8	1	Paulina Götschi	Switzerland	59.32	8	59.61	11	1:58.93	+1.52
9	6	Jessica Victoria	Brazil	59.89	12	59.17	6	1:59.06	+1.65
9	7	Martha Niziolek	Canada	59.60	10	59.46	8	1:59.06	+1.65
11	10	Daniela Gheauș	Romania	59.55	9	59.65	12	1:59.20	+1.79
12	11	Anastasia Dudkina	Russia	59.87	11	59.55	10	1:59.42	+2.01
13	13	Katherine Hogan	Canada	1:00.12	13	59.88	13	2:00.00	+2.59
14	5	Taylor Rooke	Canada	1:00.56	14	1:00.22	14	2:00.78	+3.37
15	3	Karla Šola	Croatia	1:00.87	15	1:00.28	15	2:01.15	+3.74
