= Skeleton at the 2016 Winter Youth Olympics – Boys' =

Boys' Skeleton at the II Winter Youth Olympic Games
- Venue: Lillehammer Olympic Bobsleigh and Luge Track
- Dates: 19 February
- Competitors: 20 from 15 nations
- Winning time: 1:47.30

Medalists
| 1st place, gold medalist(s) | | Evgenii Rukosuev | Russia |
| 2nd place, silver medalist(s) | | Alexander Hestengen | Norway |
| 3rd place, bronze medalist(s) | | Robin Schneider | Germany |

The boys' skeleton event at the 2016 Winter Youth Olympics took place on 19 February at the Lillehammer Olympic Bobsleigh and Luge Track.

== Results ==
| Rank | Bib | Athlete | Country | Run 1 | Rank 1 | Run 2 | Rank 2 | Total | Behind |
|---|---|---|---|---|---|---|---|---|---|
| 1st place, gold medalist(s) | 1 | Evgenii Rukosuev | Russia | 53.92 | 1 | 53.38 | 1 | 1:47.30 | – |
| 2nd place, silver medalist(s) | 9 | Alexander Hestengen | Norway | 53.99 | 2 | 53.95 | 2 | 1:47.94 | +0.64 |
| 3rd place, bronze medalist(s) | 10 | Robin Schneider | Germany | 54.02 | 3 | 54.08 | 3 | 1:48.10 | +0.80 |
| 4 | 4 | Krists Netlaus | Latvia | 54.09 | 4 | 54.09 | 4 | 1:48.18 | +0.88 |
| 5 | 11 | Florian Heinrich | Germany | 54.32 | 5 | 54.28 | 5 | 1:48.60 | +1.30 |
| 6 | 8 | Samuel Maier | Austria | 54.60 | 8 | 54.35 | 6 | 1:48.95 | +1.65 |
| 7 | 12 | Alisher Mamedov | Russia | 54.57 | 7 | 54.54 | 7 | 1:49.11 | +1.81 |
| 8 | 3 | Jung Seung-gi | South Korea | 54.51 | 6 | 54.86 | 10 | 1:49.37 | +2.07 |
| 8 | 14 | Vladyslav Heraskevych | Ukraine | 54.70 | 9 | 54.67 | 8 | 1:49.37 | +2.07 |
| 10 | 5 | Martin Stampfer | Austria | 54.73 | 10 | 54.85 | 9 | 1:49.58 | +2.28 |
| 11 | 7 | Kindrick Carter | United States | 55.16 | 11 | 54.95 | 11 | 1:50.11 | +2.81 |
| 12 | 16 | Kevin Akeret | Switzerland | 55.35 | 12 | 55.09 | 12 | 1:50.44 | +3.14 |
| 13 | 13 | Mitchell Jones | United States | 55.43 | 13 | 55.61 | 14 | 1:51.04 | +3.74 |
| 14 | 6 | Mihail Sebastian Enache | Romania | 55.58 | 14 | 55.59 | 13 | 1:51.17 | +3.87 |
| 15 | 18 | Sho Gonai | Japan | 55.63 | 15 | 55.71 | 15 | 1:51.34 | +4.04 |
| 16 | 2 | Mihai Razvan Trasnea | Romania | 55.73 | 16 | 56.21 | 17 | 1:51.94 | +4.64 |
| 17 | 17 | Zachary Lipinski | Canada | 55.81 | 17 | 56.26 | 18 | 1:52.07 | +4.77 |
| 18 | 19 | Bram Zeegers | Netherlands | 56.54 | 18 | 56.16 | 16 | 1:52.70 | +5.40 |
| 19 | 15 | Robert Neves | Brazil | 57.47 | 19 | 57.79 | 20 | 1:55.26 | +7.96 |
| 20 | 20 | Peng Lin-wei | Chinese Taipei | 57.93 | 20 | 57.72 | 19 | 1:55.65 | +8.35 |
