= Johann Rosenzopf =

Austrian former industrial manager (born 1939)

Johann Rosenzopf (22 April 1939 in Klagenfurt – 11 May 2018) was an Austrian former industrial manager, who meanwhile has retired. He developed the idea of the official Youth Olympic Games which were introduced in 2007 by the International Olympic Committee (IOC).

Rosenzopf developed the idea firstly in the year 1998, when he came in contact with the Austrian Olympic Committee (ÖOC) and the IOC, presenting them his idea of Youth Olympic Games. Though he promoted his idea during the following years, the IOC at first was not in favour of building up additional international multisports events. They told Rosenzopf they were afraid of overloading the sports calendar for young people and feared the costs being too high.

However, in July 2007 the IOC declared the introduction of the Olympic Games for young people.

Finally, in November 2010 the IOC conceded Rosenzopf being the initiator of the idea of the Youth Olympic Games: Jacques Rogge, President of the IOC, declared in an official statement that Rosenzopf "made a major contribution and provided significant impetus to the global vision of creating Youth Olympic Games".

Rosenzopf died in 2018, at the age of 78.
