= Chinese Taipei at the 2016 Winter Youth Olympics =

- IOC code: TPE
- NOC: Chinese Taipei Olympic Committee

in Lillehammer
- Competitors: 4 in 4 sports
- Medals: Gold 0 Silver 0 Bronze 0 Total 0

Winter Youth Olympics appearances (overview)
- 2012; 2016; 2020; 2024

Chinese Taipei competed at the 2016 Winter Youth Olympics in Lillehammer, Norway from 12 to 21 February 2016.

== Alpine skiing ==
Girls

Athlete	Event	Run 1		Run 2		Total	
Athlete	Event	Time	Rank	Time	Rank	Time	Rank
Wei-Hsuan Chen	Slalom	1:38.38	40	1:33.65	34	3:12.03	34
Wei-Hsuan Chen	Giant slalom	2:42.80	44	2:25.57	38	5:08.37	38

== Ice hockey ==
Athlete	Event	Qualification		Final	
Athlete	Event	Points	Rank	Points	Rank
Mu-Hsin Hsieh	Boys' individual skills challenge	7	15	did not advance	

== Luge ==
Chinese Taipei qualified one boy.

Boys

Athlete	Event	Final			
Athlete	Event	Run 1	Run 2	Total	Rank
Chun-Hung Chiang	Boys' Singles	49.998	50.624	1:40.622	18

== Skeleton ==
Athlete	Event	Run 1		Run 2		Total	
Athlete	Event	Time	Rank	Time	Rank	Time	Rank
Lin-Wei Peng	Boys	57.93	20	57.72	19	1:55.65	20

== See also ==
- Chinese Taipei at the 2016 Summer Olympics
