= Skeleton at the 2016 Winter Youth Olympics =

Skeleton at the II Winter Youth Olympic Games
- Venue: Lillehammer Olympic Bobsleigh and Luge Track
- Dates: 19 February
- Competitors: 40

Skeleton at the 2016 Winter Youth Olympics was held at the Lillehammer Olympic Bobsleigh and Luge Track in Lillehammer, Norway on 19 February. The competition included a boys' and a girls' event.

== Medal summary ==
=== Medal table ===
* Host nation (Norway)

| Rank | Nation | Gold | Silver | Bronze | Total |
|---|---|---|---|---|---|
| 1 | Great Britain | 1 | 0 | 0 | 1 |
| 1 | Russia | 1 | 0 | 0 | 1 |
| 3 | Germany | 0 | 1 | 1 | 2 |
| 4 | Norway* | 0 | 1 | 0 | 1 |
| 5 | France | 0 | 0 | 1 | 1 |
| Totals (5 entries) | | 2 | 2 | 2 | 6 |

=== Events ===
| Event | Gold | | Silver | | Bronze | |
|---|---|---|---|---|---|---|
| Boys' | Evgenii Rukosuev; Russia | 1:47.30 | Alexander Hestengen; Norway | 1:47.94 | Robin Schneider; Germany | 1:48.10 |
| Girls' | Ashleigh Fay Pittaway; Great Britain | 1:50.23 | Hannah Neise; Germany | 1:51.19 | Agathe Bessard; France | 1:52.45 |

== Qualification system ==
Each nation could send a maximum of 8 athletes (4 boys and 4 girls). The FIBT ranking were used to allocate places to NOC's. Participation, for each of the men’s and women’s competitions, was limited to a total of 20 athletes each, including the host nation. The NOC quotas were based on the updated FIBT ranking. Qualification was achieved by the results of athletes, who gain a qualification place for their NOC. Male and female athletes of non represented continents could also participate, with 1 male and 1 female athlete, provided that the maximum quota of 20 men and 20 women was not yet filled. Athletes must also meet eligibility criteria, which is explained in detail in the qualification system.

=== Quota allocation ===
The current allocation according to the world rankings.

| Event | Total | Qualified Boys' | Qualified Girls' |
|---|---|---|---|
| Host nation | 1 | Norway | Norway |
| World Rankings | 19 | Austria; Austria; Brazil; Canada; Germany; Japan; Latvia; Netherlands; Romania; Romania; Russia; South Korea; South Korea; Sweden; Switzerland; Chinese Taipei; Ukraine; United States; United States | Austria; Brazil; Brazil; Canada; France; Germany; Great Britain; Japan; Latvia; Latvia; Netherlands; Romania; Romania; Russia; Russia; South Korea; Sweden; United States; United States |
| TOTAL | | 20 | 20 |

=== Qualification summary ===
| NOC | Boys' | Girls' | Total |
|---|---|---|---|
| Austria | 2 | 1 | 3 |
| Brazil | 1 | 2 | 3 |
| Canada | 1 | 1 | 2 |
| France | | 1 | 1 |
| Germany | 1 | 1 | 2 |
| Great Britain | | 1 | 1 |
| Japan | 1 | 1 | 2 |
| Latvia | 1 | 2 | 3 |
| Netherlands | 1 | 1 | 2 |
| Norway | 1 | 1 | 2 |
| Romania | 2 | 2 | 4 |
| Russia | 1 | 2 | 3 |
| South Korea | 2 | 1 | 3 |
| Switzerland | 1 | | 1 |
| Sweden | 1 | 1 | 2 |
| Chinese Taipei | 1 | | 1 |
| Ukraine | 1 | | 1 |
| United States | 2 | 2 | 4 |
| Total athletes | 20 | 20 | 40 |
| Total NOCs | 16 | 15 | 18 |
