= Florian Heinrich =

Austrian footballer

Personal information
- Date of birth: 31 August 1995 (age 31)
- Place of birth: Wien, Austria
- Height: 1.84 m (6 ft 1/2 in)
- Position: Defender

Youth career
- 2000–2001: Austria Wien
- 2001–2004: First Vienna FC
- 2004–2011: Austria Wien
- 2011–2014: FC Schalke 04

Senior career*
Years	Team	Apps	(Gls)
2015	SK Austria Klagenfurt (2007)	1	(0)
2015–2016	SK Maria Saal	14	(1)
2016	Floridsdorfer AC	5	(0)

International career^{‡}
2010	Austria U16	1	(0)
2011	Austria U17	5	(0)
- * Club domestic league appearances and goals as of 4 July 2016 ‡ National team caps and goals as of 09 June 2016

Florian Heinrich (born 31 August 1995) is an Austrian footballer.
