= Juliane Frühwirt =

German biathlete (born 1998)

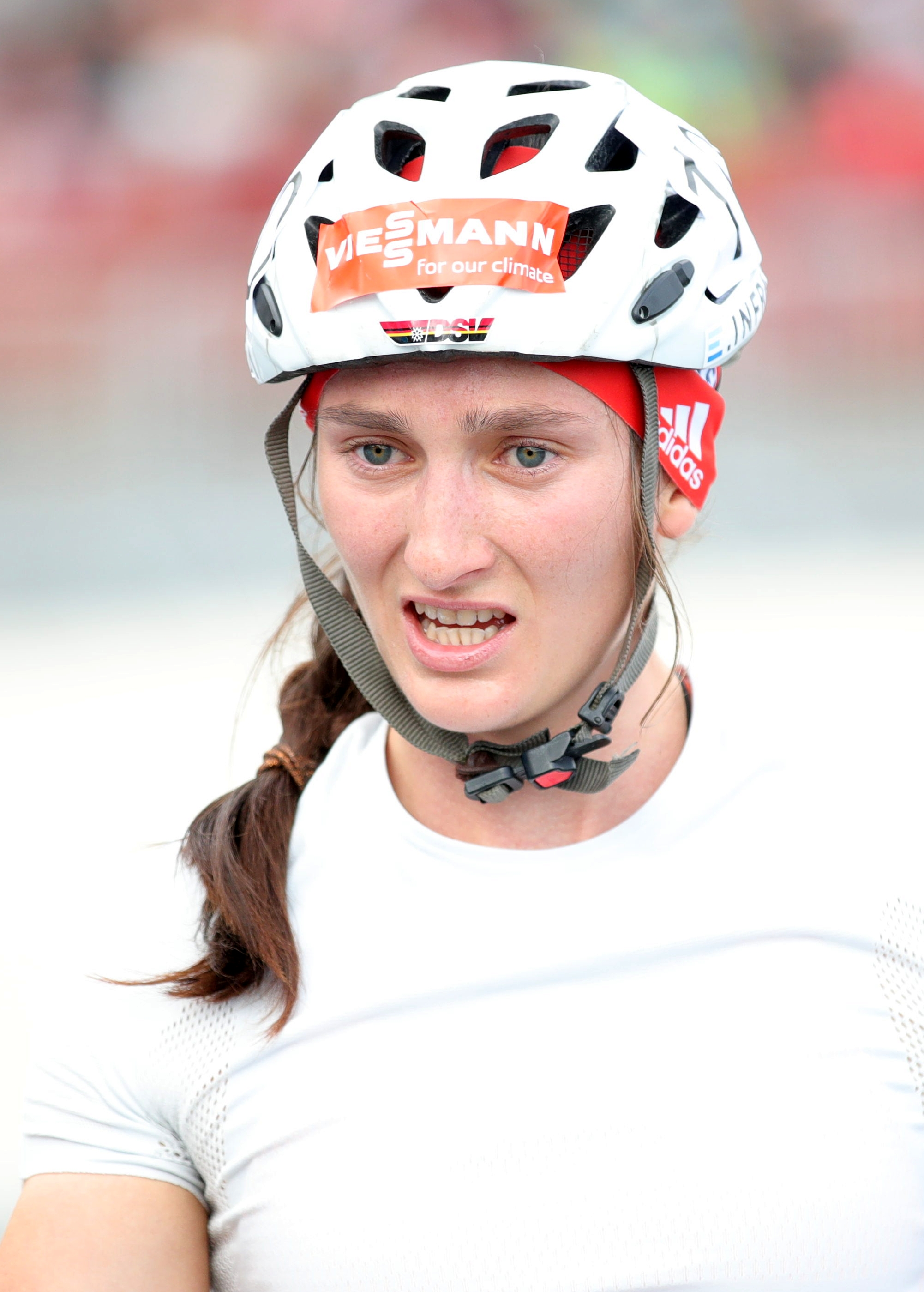

Personal information
- Nationality: German
- Born: 18 March 1998 (age 28) Gotha, Thuringia, Germany
- Height: 1.66 m (5 ft 5 in)
- Weight: 57 kg (126 lb)

Sport
Medal record
Women's biathlon
Representing Germany
Winter Youth Olympics
Gold medal – first place	2016 Lillehammer	6 km sprint
Silver medal – second place	2016 Lillehammer	Mixed relay
Junior World Championships
Silver medal – second place	2019 Osrblie	12.5 km individual
Silver medal – second place	2019 Osrblie	3 × 6 km relay
- Updated on 22 February 2021

Juliana Frühwirt (born 18 March 1998) is a German former biathlete.

She was the gold medalist at the 2016 Winter Youth Olympics for the women's 6 km biathlon sprint.

She competed in several international biathlon races and was sponsored by Viessmann, a German manufacturer of heating, industrial, and refrigeration systems.
