= United States at the Youth Olympics =

- Flag of the United States
- IOC code: USA
- NOC: United States Olympic Committee
- Medals Ranked 5th: Gold 39 Silver 42 Bronze 36 Total 117

Summer appearances
- 2010; 2014; 2018

Winter appearances
- 2012; 2016; 2020; 2024

The United States of America has sent athletes to every celebration of the Youth Olympic Games. The United States Olympic Committee (USOC) is the National Olympic Committee for the United States.

U.S. athletes have won a total of 61 medals (20 of them gold) at the Summer Youth Olympic Games and another 35 at the Winter Youth Olympic Games. Most medals have been won in athletics (track and field) (13) and snowboarding (11). American skier Robin Reynolds is the most-decorated Youth Olympic athlete of the United States, with 3 medals (all gold).

The United States has never topped the gold medal count (as the medals are listed internationally by tradition) at a Summer Youth Olympics and topped the gold medal count once at the Winter Youth Olympics.

== Medal tables ==
=== Medals by summer sport ===
Leading in that sport

Sport	Gold	Silver	Bronze	Total
Athletics	4	3	6	13
Swimming	4	2	2	8
Wrestling	2	4	0	6
Boxing	2	1	1	4
Basketball	2	0	2	4
Judo	2	0	0	2
Fencing	1	3	1	5
Taekwondo	1	1	2	4
Gymnastics	1	0	2	3
Archery	1	0	0	1
Triathlon	0	2	1	3
Golf	0	2	0	2
Volleyball	0	1	0	1
Diving	0	0	2	2
Table tennis	0	0	2	2
Weightlifting	0	0	1	1
Totals (16 entries)	20	19	22	61

=== Medals by winter sport ===
Leading in that sport

Sport	Gold	Silver	Bronze	Total
Snowboarding	7	4	0	11
Freestyle skiing	5	6	5	16
Alpine skiing	3	0	0	3
Ice hockey	1	1	0	2
Short track speed skating	1	1	0	2
Luge	1	0	1	2
Nordic combined	0	1	1	2
Curling	0	1	0	1
Figure skating	0	1	0	1
Ski jumping	0	1	0	1
Cross-country skiing	0	0	2	2
Biathlon	0	0	1	1
Speed skating	0	0	1	1
Totals (13 entries)	18	16	11	45

== See also ==
- United States at the Olympics
- United States at the Paralympics
