= Brooke Apshkrum =

Latvian Canadian luger (born 1999)

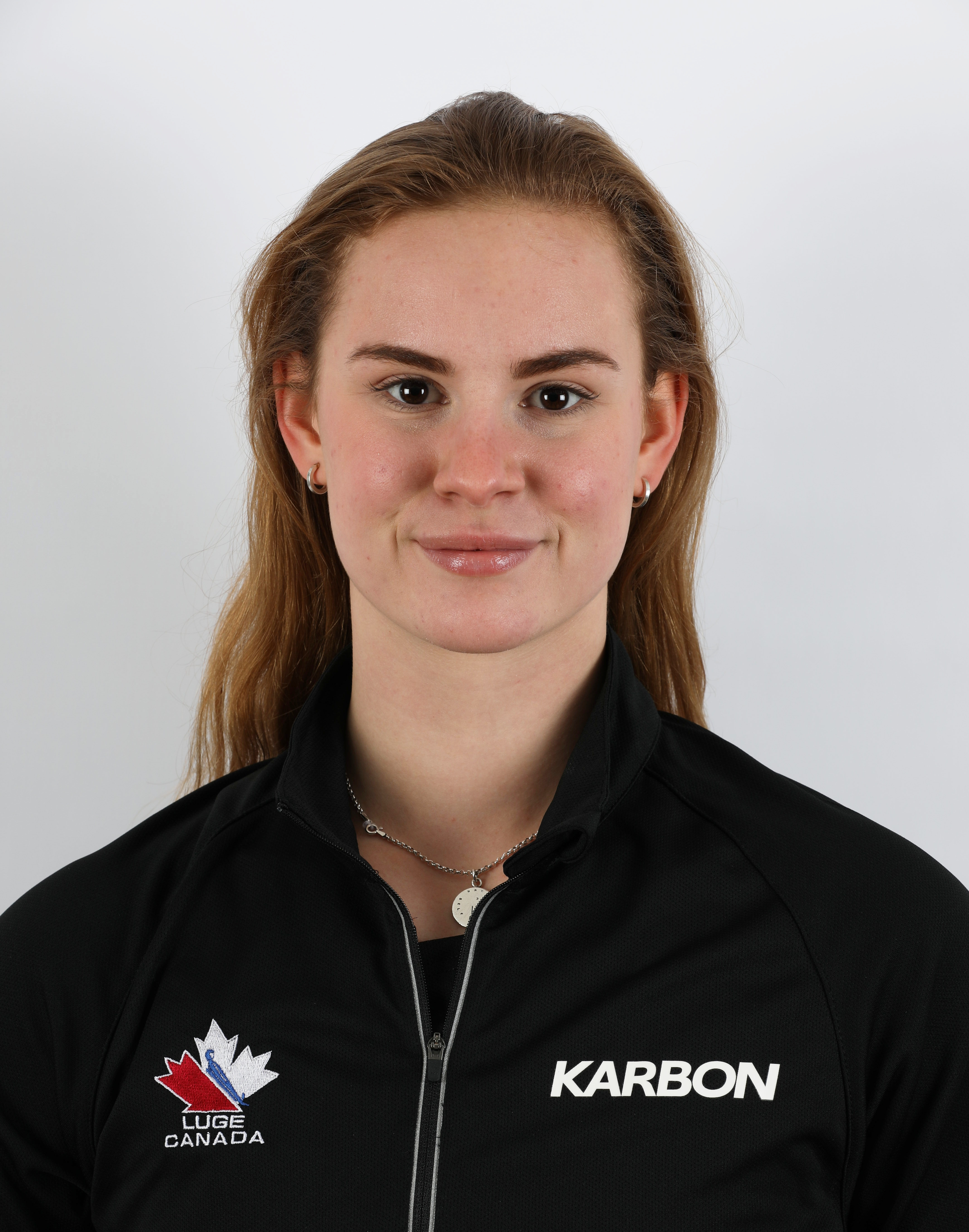
- Apshkrum in 2018

Personal information
- Born: September 9, 1999 (age 26) Calgary, Alberta, Canada
- Height: 174 cm (5 ft 9 in)
- Weight: 71 kg (157 lb)

Sport
- Country: Canada
- Sport: Luge
- Event: Women's singles
Medal record
Youth Olympic Games
Gold medal – first place	2016 Lillehammer	Girls' singles

Brooke Apshkrum (Latvian: Brūka Apškrūma; born September 9, 1999) is a Canadian luger.

== Career ==
=== 2015–2016 season ===
Apshkrum won the gold medal in the girls' singles event at the second Winter Youth Olympics in Lillehammer, Norway.

=== 2017–2018 season ===
In December 2017, Apshkrum was named to Canada's Olympic team for the 2018 Winter Olympics in Pyeongchang, South Korea.
