= Reid Watts =

Canadian luger (born 1998)

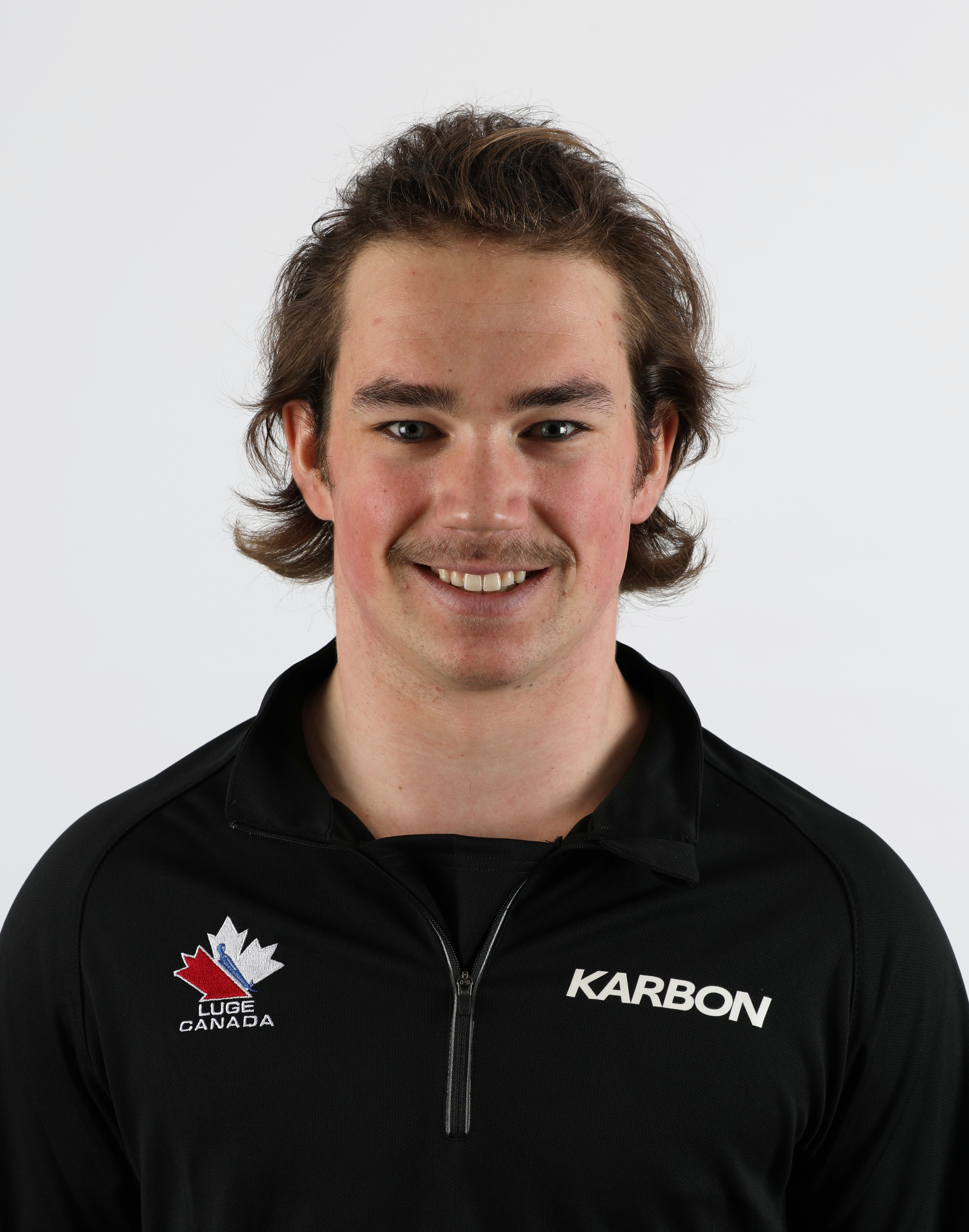
- Reid Watts (2018)

Personal information
- Born: December 22, 1998 (age 27) Vancouver, British Columbia
- Height: 183 cm (6 ft 0 in)
- Weight: 75 kg (165 lb)
Medal record
Youth Olympics
Bronze medal – third place	2016 Lillehammer	Singles

Reid Watts (born December 22, 1998) is a Canadian luger.

== Career ==
=== 2015–2016 season ===
Watts won the bronze medal in the boys' singles event at the second Winter Youth Olympics in Lillehammer, Norway.

=== 2017–2018 season ===
In December 2017, Watts was named to Canada's Olympic team for the 2018 Winter Olympics in Pyeongchang, South Korea.

=== 2022 Olympics ===
In January 2022, Watts was named to Canada's 2022 Olympic team.
