= Biathlon at the 2016 Winter Youth Olympics =

Biathlon at the II Winter Youth Olympic Games
- Venue: Birkebeineren Ski Stadium; Lillehammer
- Dates: 14–21 February
- Competitors: 99 from 32 nations

Biathlon at the 2016 Winter Youth Olympics took place at the Birkebeineren Ski Stadium in Lillehammer, Norway.

== Events ==
=== Medal table ===
* Host nation (Norway)

Rank	Nation	Gold	Silver	Bronze	Total
1	Norway*	2	4	0	6
2	Germany	1	1	0	2
3	France	1	0	1	2
4	China	1	0	0	1
4	Ukraine	1	0	0	1
6	Russia	0	1	3	4
7	Italy	0	0	1	1
7	Kazakhstan	0	0	1	1
Totals (8 entries)		6	6	6	18

=== Boys' events ===
Event	Gold		Silver		Bronze	
Sprint	Emilien Claude; France	19:01.5 (0+0)	Sivert Bakken; Norway	19:08.6 (1+1)	Egor Tutmin; Russia	19:19.5 (0+2)
Pursuit	Sivert Guttorm Bakken; Norway	28:10.7 (1+1+1+1)	Egor Tutmin; Russia	29:21.4 (0+1+3+1)	Said Karimulla Khalili; Russia	29:28.4 (1+1+1+1)

=== Girls' events ===
Event	Gold		Silver		Bronze	
Sprint	Juliane Frühwirt; Germany	18:23.5 (0+0)	Marthe Kråkstad Johansen; Norway	18:29.1 (0+1)	Arina Pantova; Kazakhstan	18:40.6 (1+1)
Pursuit	Khrystyna Dmytrenko; Ukraine	25:12.9 (2+0+0+0)	Marthe Kråkstad Johansen; Norway	25:20.4 (2+0+1+1)	Lou Jeanmonnot-Laurent; France	25:20.5 (0+0+1+1)

=== Mixed events ===
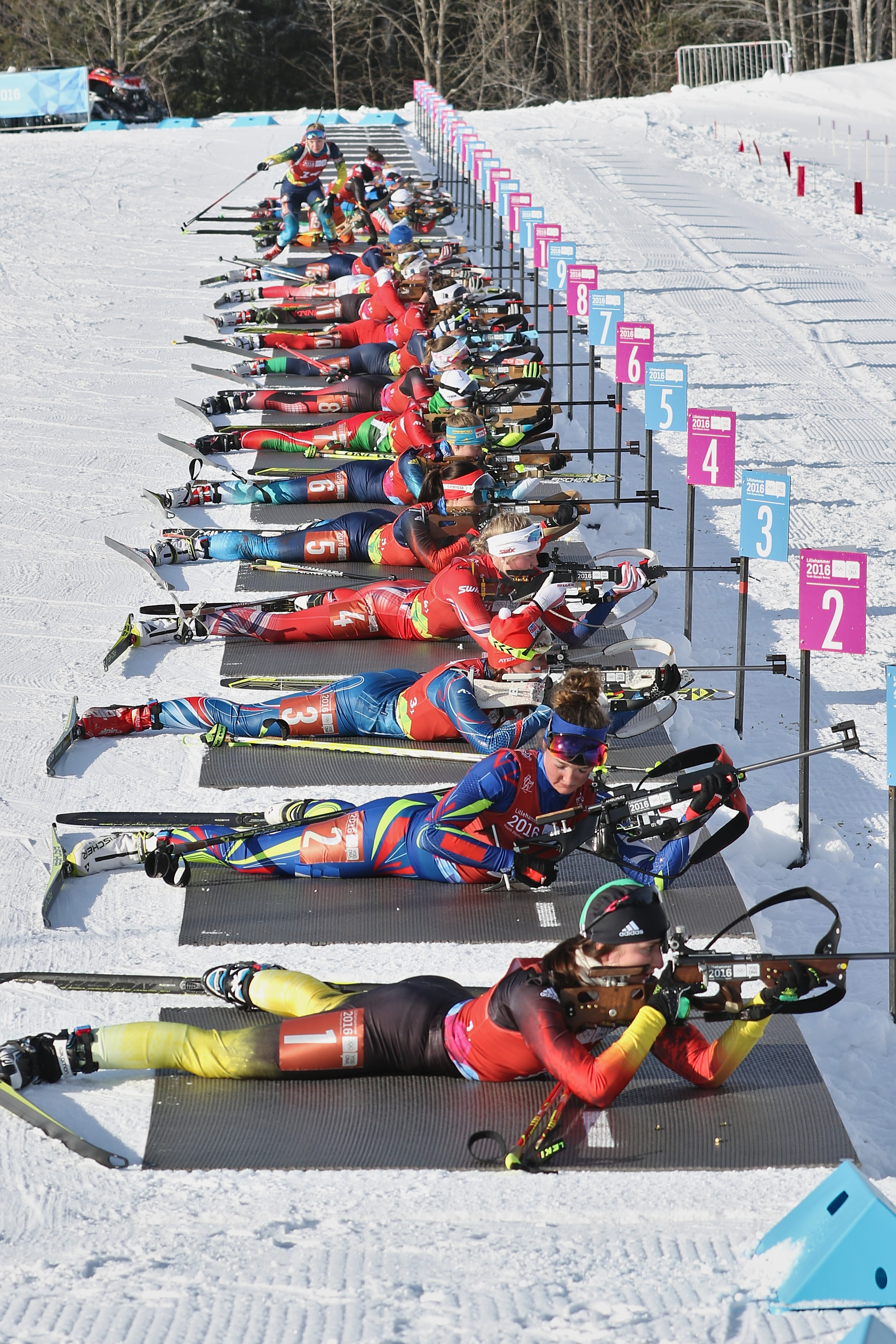
Biathlon mixed relay - Leg 1

Event	Gold		Silver		Bronze	
Single mixed relay	China; Meng Fanqi; Zhu Zhenyu; Meng Fanqi; Zhu Zhenyu	41:35.4 (0+0) (0+0) (0+0) (2+3) (0+0) (0+0) (0+0) (0+0)	Norway; Marthe Kråkstad Johansen; Fredrik Bucher-Johannessen; Marthe Kråkstad Johansen; Fredrik Bucher-Johannessen	41:35.6 (0+0) (0+1) (0+2) (1+3) (0+2) (0+0) (0+1) (0+3)	Russia; Ekaterina Ponedelko; Egor Tutmin; Ekaterina Ponedelko; Egor Tutmin	41:50.3 (0+0) (3+3) (0+3) (0+2) (0+0) (0+2) (0+0) (0+3)
Mixed relay	Norway; Marit Øygard; Marthe Kråkstad Johansen; Fredrik Bucher-Johannessen; Sivert Bakken	1:18:35.6 (0+3) (0+2) (0+0) (0+2) (0+3) (0+1) (0+0) (0+0)	Germany; Juliane Frühwirt; Franziska Pfnuer; Simon Gross; Danilo Riethmueller	1:18:43.2 (0+3) (0+2) (0+0) (0+0) (0+1) (0+0) (0+1) (0+2)	Italy; Samuela Comola; Irene Lardschneider; Cedric Christille; Patrick Braunhofer	1:20:06.0 (0+0) (0+0) (0+0) (0+2) (0+1) (0+2) (0+0) (0+1)
