= Luge at the 2016 Winter Youth Olympics =

Luge at the II Winter Youth Olympic Games
- Venue: Lillehammer Olympic Bobsleigh and Luge Track
- Dates: 14–16 February
- Competitors: 70

Luge at the 2016 Winter Youth Olympics took place at the Lillehammer Olympic Bobsleigh and Luge Track venue in Lillehammer, Norway.

== Medal summary ==
=== Medal table ===
Rank	Nation	Gold	Silver	Bronze	Total
1	Germany	1	3	0	4
2	Canada	1	0	1	2
2	Italy	1	0	1	2
4	Latvia	1	0	0	1
5	Russia	0	1	1	2
6	Austria	0	0	1	1
Totals (6 entries)		4	4	4	12

=== Events ===
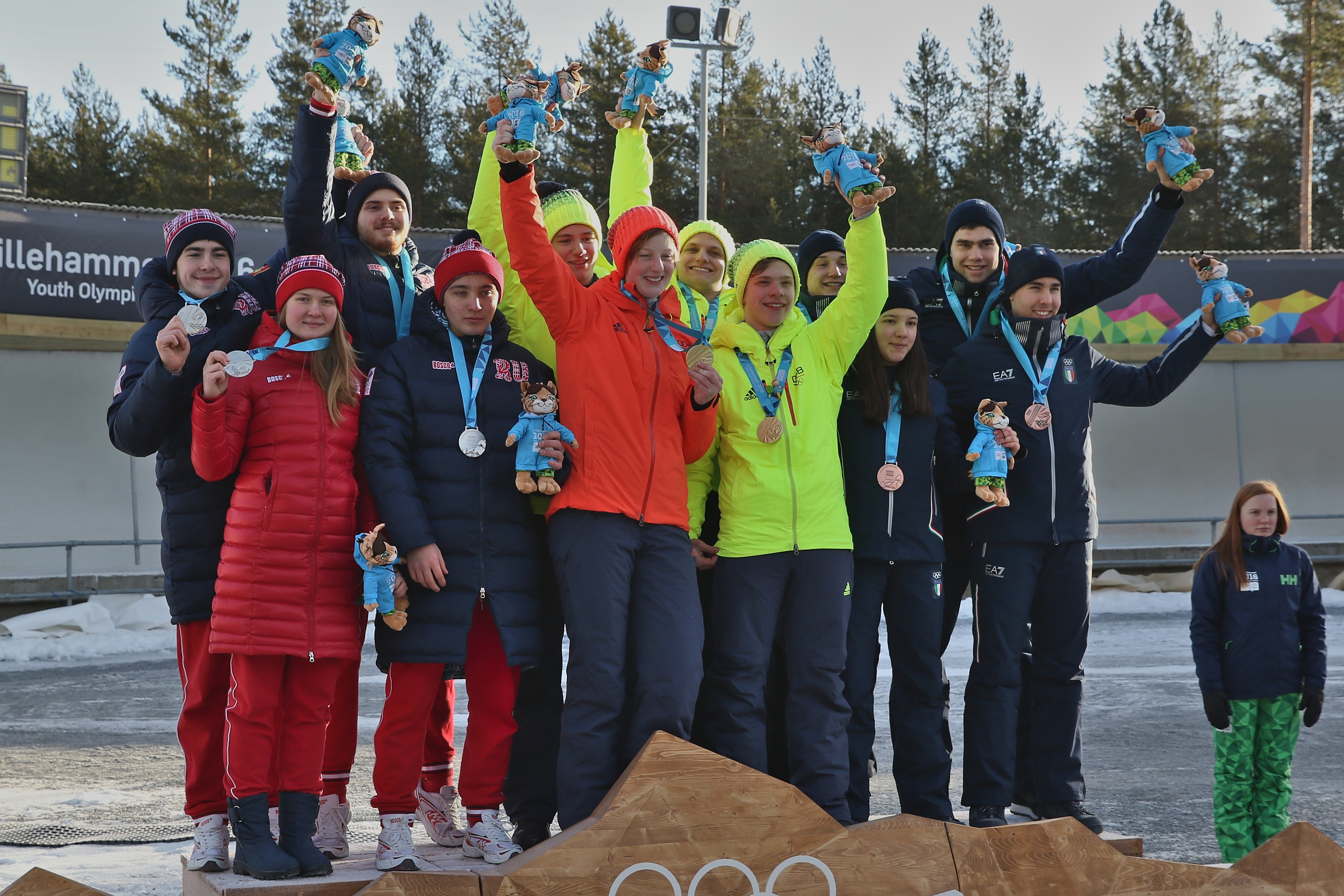
Luge team relay medalists

Events	Gold		Silver		Bronze	
Boys' singles	Kristers Aparjods; Latvia	1:35.309	Paul-Lukas Heider; Germany	1:35.955	Reid Watts; Canada	1:36.994
Girls' singles	Brooke Apshkrum; Canada	1:46.026	Jessica Tiebel; Germany	1:46.097	Madeleine Egle; Austria	1:46.267
Doubles	Felix Schwarz; Lukas Gufler; Italy	1:44.260	Hannes Orlamünder; Paul Gubitz; Germany	1:45.114	Vsevolod Kashkin; Konstantin Korshunov; Russia	1:45.272
Team relay	Germany; Jessica Tiebel; Paul-Lukas Heider; Hannes Orlamünder; Paul Gubitz	2:52.520	Russia; Olesya Mikhaylenko; Evgenii Petrov; Vsevolod Kashkin; Konstantin Korshunov	2:52.708	Italy; Marion Oberhofer; Fabian Malleier; Felix Schwarz; Lukas Gufler	2:53.040

== Qualification system ==
The rankings from the 2014–15 and 2015–16 Junior Luge world cup were used to qualify entries. Every nation was guaranteed one sled in each event if they met the minimum standard. If there were more sled than quotas then the world cup rankings were used. The maximum total for an NOC was six athletes (2 boys, 2 girls and one doubles), with a maximum total of 20 athletes in the singles and 15 in the doubles. If the host nation would not qualify, the last quota spot would be awarded to Austria. If an event would not have enough qualifiers, the quota spots left over were allocated to the other events equally. A nation could enter the team event if it has qualified an athlete in each event. If spots were reallocated, first priority would be given to nations that have not qualified an athlete yet. A country qualifying in all events may enter the team relay, along with countries made up of athletes from a maximum of 2 athletes.

=== Qualification summary ===
The following is the quota summary. In this case only 13 sleds were eligible in the doubles, meaning each individual event received 2 additional quotas.

Event	Total	Qualified Boys'	Qualified Girls'	Qualified Doubles
Host nation	1/1/0	Norway	Norway	~~Norway~~
World Rankings	21/21/13	Austria; Bulgaria; Canada; Chinese Taipei; Czech Republic; France; Georgia; Germany; Great Britain; Italy; Italy; Latvia; Moldova; Poland; Romania; Russia; Slovakia; Sweden; Turkey; Ukraine; United States	Argentina; Austria; Australia; Bulgaria; Canada; Czech Republic; France; Germany; Germany; Italy; Kazakhstan; Latvia; Moldova; Poland; Romania; Russia; Slovakia; Sweden; Turkey; Ukraine; United States	Austria; Canada; Czech Republic; Germany; Italy; Kazakhstan; Latvia; Poland; Romania; Russia; Slovakia; Ukraine; United States
TOTAL		22	22	13

NOC	Boys	Girls	Doubles	Relay	Total
Argentina		1			1
Austria	1	1	2	X	4
Australia		1			1
Bulgaria	1	1			2
Canada	1	1	2	X	4
Chinese Taipei	1				1
Czech Republic	1	1	2	X	4
France	1	1			2
Georgia	1				1
Germany	1	2	2	X	5
Great Britain	1				1
Italy	2	1	2	X	5
Kazakhstan		1	2		3
Latvia	1	1	2	X	4
Moldova	1	1			2
Norway	1	1			2
Poland	1	1	2	X	4
Romania	1	1	2	X	4
Russia	1	1	2	X	4
Slovakia	1	1	2	X	4
Sweden	1	1			2
Turkey	1	1			2
Ukraine	1	1	2	X	4
United States	1	1	2	X	4
Total athletes	22	22	26		70
Total NOCs	21	21	13	12	24
