= Nordic combined at the 2016 Winter Youth Olympics =

Nordic Combined at the II Winter Youth Olympic Games
- Venue: Lysgårdsbakken, Lillehammer
- Dates: 16 February
- Competitors: 20 Quota limit

Nordic combined at the 2016 Winter Youth Olympics was held at the Lysgårdsbakken in Lillehammer, Norway on 16 February. Nordic combined athletes also took part at the mixed ski jumping team event and the nordic team event.

== Medal summary ==
=== Medal table ===
* Host nation (Norway)

Rank	Nation	Gold	Silver	Bronze	Total
1	Germany	1	0	1	2
2	Russia	1	0	0	1
3	Norway*	0	1	0	1
3	United States	0	1	0	1
5	Czech Republic	0	0	1	1
Totals (5 entries)		2	2	2	6

=== Events ===
==== Boys' events ====
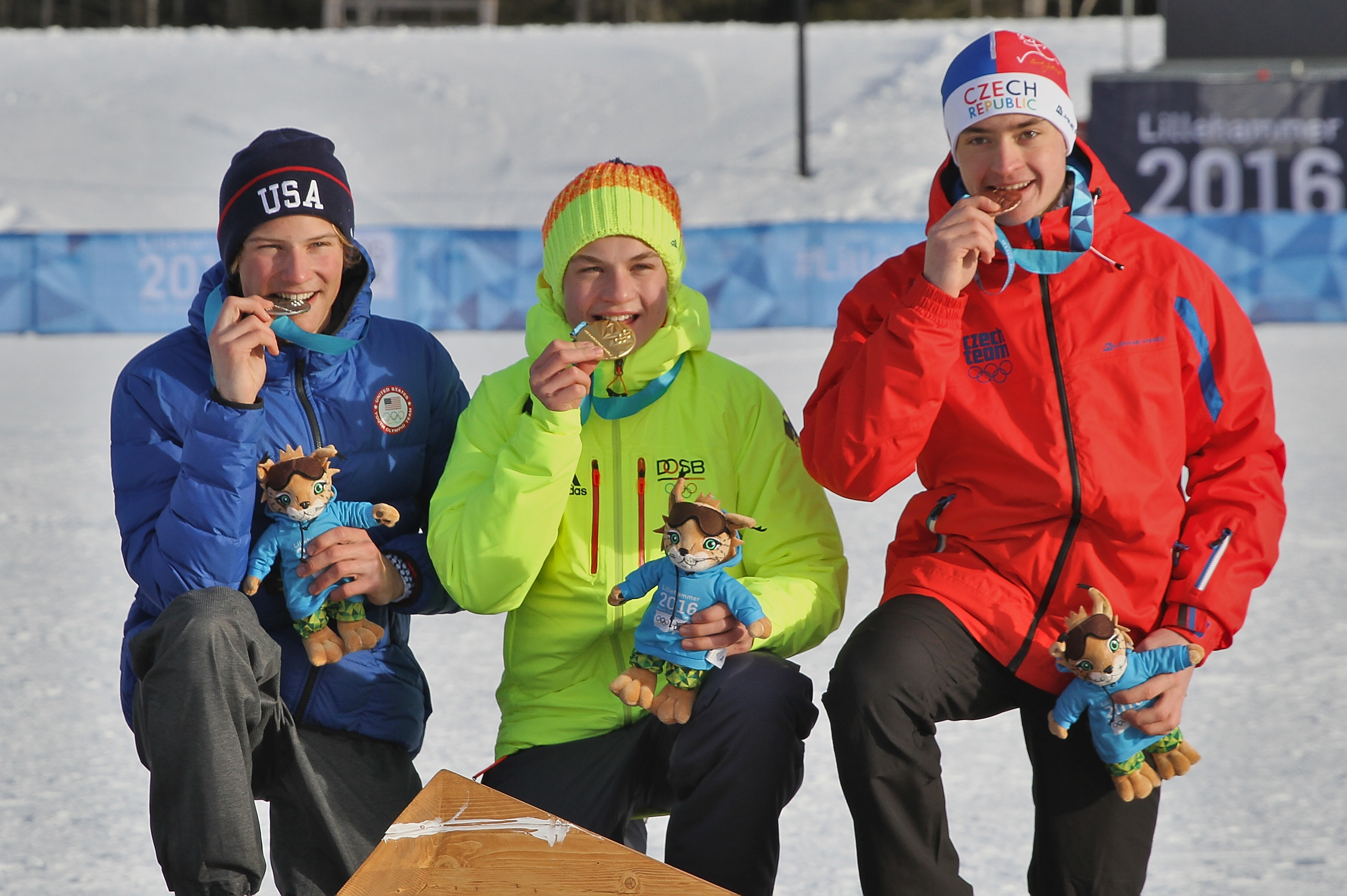
Medalists

Event	Gold		Silver		Bronze	
Boys' normal hill individual/5 km	Tim Kopp; Germany	13:31.4	Ben Loomis; United States	13:36.6	Ondřej Pažout; Czech Republic	13:39.3

==== Mixed events ====
Event	Gold		Silver		Bronze	
Nordic team normal hill/3x3.3 km	Russia; Sofia Tikhonova; Vitalii Ivanov; Maksim Sergeev; Maya Yakunina; Igor Fedotov	26:16.9	Norway; Anna Odine Strøm; Einar Lurås Oftebro; Marius Lindvik; Martine Engebretsen; Vebjoern Hegdal	26:38.0	Germany; Agnes Reisch; Tim Kopp; Jonathan Siegel; Anna-Maria Dietze; Philipp Unger	26:38.4

== Qualification system ==
Each nation could send a maximum of 1 boy. The top scoring teams of the Marc Hodler Trophy Ski Jumping at the 2015 Junior Nordic World Ski Championships plus the hosts Norway were allowed to send the maximum of 1 boy. Any remaining quota spots were distributed to nations not already qualified, with a maximum of one boy or girl from one nation. The quota limit was 20.

=== Qualification summary ===
NOC	Boys	Total
Austria	1	1
Czech Republic	1	1
Estonia	1	1
Finland	1	1
France	1	1
Germany	1	1
Italy	1	1
Japan	1	1
Kazakhstan	1	1
Norway	1	1
Poland	1	1
Russia	1	1
Slovenia	1	1
Ukraine	1	1
United States	1	1
Total athletes	15	15
Total NOCs	15	15
