= Youth Olympic Games =

International multi-sport event

The Youth Olympic Games are an international multi-sport event for athletes aged 15 to 18 years old. Organized by the International Olympic Committee (IOC), the Games are held every four years in staggered summer and winter events consistent with the current Olympic Games format, though in reverse order with the Winter Olympic Games held in leap years instead of the Games of the Olympiad. The first summer version was held in Singapore from 14 to 26 August 2010 while the first winter version was held in Austria from 13 to 22 January 2012.

The idea of such an event was introduced by Johann Rosenzopf from Austria in 1998. On 6 July 2007, International Olympic Committee members at the 119th IOC session in Guatemala City approved the creation of a youth version of the Olympic Games, with the intention of sharing the costs of hosting the event between the IOC and the host city, whereas the travelling costs of athletes and coaches were to be paid by the IOC. These Games will also feature cultural exchange programs and opportunities for participants to meet Olympic athletes.

Several other Olympic events for youth, like the European Youth Olympic Festival held every other year with summer and winter versions, and the Australian Youth Olympic Festival, have proven successful. The Youth Games are modelled after these sporting events, but have been held quadrenially. The YOG is also a successor to the discontinued World Youth Games.

The Summer Youth Olympic Games of Singapore in 2010 and Nanjing in 2014 each played host to 3600 athletes and lasted 13 days, whereas the Winter YOG of Innsbruck in 2012 had 1059 athletes and Lillehammer in 2016 had 1100 athletes and lasted 10 days. Even though this exceeded initial estimates, the YOG are still both smaller in size as well as shorter than their senior equivalents. The most recent Summer YOG was the 2018 Summer Youth Olympics held in Buenos Aires, Argentina. The most recent Winter YOG was the 2024 Winter Youth Olympics in Gangwon, South Korea. The next Summer YOG are scheduled to be held in Dakar, Senegal, in 2026. The next Winter YOG are scheduled to be held in 2028 and will be joint hosted by the Dolomites and Valtellina regions in Italy.

In 2026, IOC president Kirsty Coventry announced a restructuring of the Olympic movement and a pause on awarding any future editions of the Youth Olympic Games.

== History ==
The concept of the Youth Olympic Games came from Austrian industrial manager Johann Rosenzopf in 1998. This was in response to growing global concerns about childhood obesity and the dropping participation of youth in sport activities, especially amongst youth in developed nations. It was further recognized that a youth version of the Olympic Games would help foster participations in the Olympic Games. Despite these reasons for having an Olympic event for young people, the IOC's response of holding a purely sporting event was negative. IOC delegates wanted the event to be as much about cultural education and exchange as it was about sports, which is why the Culture and Education Program (CEP) was developed as a component of each celebration of the Games. Jacques Rogge, IOC President, formally announced plans for the Youth Olympic Games at the 119th IOC session in Guatemala City on 6 July 2007. There are several goals for the YOG, and four of them include bringing together the world's best young athletes, offering an introduction into Olympism, innovating in educating and debating Olympic values. The city of Singapore was announced as the host of the inaugural Summer Youth Olympics on 21 February 2008. On 12 December 2008 the IOC announced that Innsbruck, host of the 1964 and 1976 Winter Olympics, would be the host of the inaugural Winter Youth Olympics in 2012.

== Host city or regions requirements ==
The scale of the Youth Olympic Games is smaller than that of the Olympics, which is intentional and allows for smaller cities to host an Olympic event. Potential host cities are required to keep all events within the same city and no new sports venues should be built. Exceptions to this building moratorium include a media centre, amphitheatre facilities for classes and workshops, and a village for coaches and athletes. This village is to be the heart of the Games for the athletes, and the hub of activity. No new or unique transportation systems are required as all athletes and coaches will be transported by local shuttles. According to bid procedures, the athletics venue must hold 10,000 people, and a bidding city must have a 2,500-seat aquatics facility for the Summer editions.

The first logo of Youth Olympic Games

The second logo of Youth Olympic Games

The third logo of Youth Olympic Games

== Financing ==
The original estimated costs for running the Games were US$30 million for the Summer and $15 million to $20 million for Winter Games (these costs did not include infrastructure improvements for venue construction). The IOC has stipulated that costs for infrastructure and venues is to be paid by the host city. The IOC will pay travel costs to the host city and room and board for the athletes and judges, estimated at $11 million. The funding will come from IOC funds and not revenues. The budgets for the final two bids for the inaugural Summer Games as submitted by the IOC came in at $90 million, much higher than the estimated costs. The cost of the first games in Singapore escalated to an estimated S$387 million ($284 million). Sponsors have been slow to sign on for the YOG, due to the fact that it is a new initiative and corporations are not sure what level of exposure they will get. The budget for the inaugural Winter Games to be held in Innsbruck has been estimated at $22.5 million, which does not include infrastructure improvements and venue construction.

== Participation ==
Over 200 countries and 3,600 athletes participated in the inaugural 2010 Youth Summer Olympics. Participants are placed in the following age groups: 15–16 years, 16–17 years, and 17–18 years. The athlete's age is determined by how old they are by 31 December of the year they are participating in the YOG. Qualification to participate in the Youth Olympics is determined by the IOC in conjunction with the International Sport Federations (ISF) for the various sports on the program. To ensure that all nations are represented at the YOG the IOC instituted the concept of Universality Places. A certain number of spots in each event are to be left open for athletes from under-represented nations regardless of qualifying marks. This is to ensure that every nation will be able to send at least four athletes to each Youth Olympic Games. For team tournaments one team per continent will be allowed to compete along with a sixth team either representing the host nation or as proposed by the IF with IOC approval. There is a cap of two teams (one boys' and one girls') per nation. Finally, no nation may enter more than 70 athletes in individual sports.

== Sports ==
=== Summer Youth Olympics ===
All sports on the core program of the Summer Olympics, as well as most of the optional sports added in the 2020 and 2024 Summer Olympics, have been represented in the program of the Summer Youth Olympics. Most team sports use versions with reduced team sizes, including replacing regular basketball with 3x3 basketball, football with futsal, handball with beach handball, field hockey with hockey5s, indoor volleyball with beach volleyball, and, in 2026, baseball with baseball5. The 2026 edition will mark the first time the summer youth program has an equal number of events for boys and girls.

Unlike the traditional Games, it is up to the Organizing Committee to choose which disciplines will be chosen to be played in collective sports. Twenty-seven sports were introduced in the 2010 Games. The Organizing Committee for the 2014 Games, chose beach volleyball (replacing their indoor counterpart) and field hockey as optional sport. In the 2018 Games, six sports were introduced: beach handball (replacing their indoor counterpart), breakdancing, futsal (replacing their association counterpart), karate, roller speed skating and sport climbing. The 28 Olympic core sports are expected to feature in the 2026 Games, being confirmed in 2020.

The following sports (or disciplines of a sport) make up the current and discontinued Summer Youth Olympic Games official program and are listed alphabetically according to the name used by the IOC. The discontinued sports were previously part of the Summer Youth Olympic Games program as official sports, but are no longer on the current program. The figures in each cell indicate the number of events for each sport contested at the respective Games; a bullet (•) denotes that the sport was contested as a demonstration sport; a multiplication sign (×) denotes that the sport was showcased as a engagement sport.

| Sport | Discipline | Code & Pictogram | Body | 10 | 14 | 18 | 26 |
|---|---|---|---|---|---|---|---|
| Archery | Archery | ARC | World Archery | 4 | 3 | 3 | 3 |
| Aquatics | Swimming | SWM | World Aquatics | 34 | 36 | 36 | 28 |
| Athletics | Athletics | ATH | World Athletics | 36 | 37 | 36 | 36 |
| Badminton | Badminton | BDM | BWF | 2 | 3 | 3 | 2 |
| Baseball | Baseball5 | BS5 | WBSC | | | | 1 |
| Basketball | 3x3 basketball | BK3 | FIBA | 2 | 4 | 4 | 2 |
| Boxing | Boxing | BOX | World Boxing | 11 | 11 | 13 | 10 |
| Cycling | Road cycling | CRD | UCI | | | | 4 |
| Dance sport | Breaking | BKG | WDSF | | | 3 | 2 |
| Equestrian | Show jumping | EJP | FEI | 2 | 2 | 2 | 1 |
| Fencing | Fencing | FEN | FIE | 7 | 7 | 7 | 6 |
| Football | Futsal | FBS | FIFA | | | 2 | 2 |
| Gymnastics | Artistic gymnastics | GAR | World Gymnastics | 12 | 12 | 12 | 5 |
| Handball | Beach handball | HBB | IHF | | | 2 | 2 |
| Judo | | JUD | IJF | 9 | 9 | 9 | 8 |
| Rowing | Coastal rowing | ROC | World Rowing | | | | 3 |
| Rugby | Rugby sevens | RU7 | World Rugby | | 2 | 2 | 2 |
| Sailing | | SAL | World Sailing | 4 | 4 | 5 | 2 |
| Skate sport | Skateboarding | SKB | World Skate | | • | | 2 |
| Table tennis | | TTE | ITTF | 3 | 3 | 3 | 3 |
| Taekwondo | | TKW | World Taekwondo | 10 | 10 | 10 | 11 |
| Triathlon | | TRI | World Triathlon | 3 | 3 | 3 | 3 |
| Volleyball | Beach volleyball | VBV | FIVB | | 2 | 2 | 2 |
| Wrestling | Beach wrestling | WRB | UWW | | | | 8 |
| Wushu | | WSU | IWUF | | • | | 4 |
| Aquatics | Diving | DIV | World Aquatics | 4 | 5 | 5 | |
| Canoe | Canoe slalom | CSL | PW | 3 | 4 | 4 | |
| Canoe | Canoe sprint | CSP | PW | 3 | 4 | 4 | × |
| Cycling | BMX freestyle | CYC | UCI | | | 1 | |
| Cycling | BMX racing | BMX | UCI | | | 1 | |
| Cycling | Multi-discipline | CYC | UCI | 1 (Note: In 2010 and 2014 Road, Mountain, and BMX Racing were combined into a single event with multiple stages.) | 3 | 2 (Note: In 2018 Road and Mountain Cycling were combined into a single event with multiple stages.) | |
| Football | Football | FBL | FIFA | 2 | 2 | | |
| Golf | Golf | GLF | IGF | | 3 | 3 | × |
| Gymnastics | Acrobatic gymnastics | GAC | World Gymnastics | | | 1 | |
| Gymnastics | Rhythmic gymnastics | GRY | World Gymnastics | 2 | 2 | 1 | |
| Gymnastics | Trampoline gymnastics | GTR | World Gymnastics | 2 | 2 | 2 | |
| Gymnastics | Multi-discipline | GYM | World Gymnastics | | | 1 (Note: In 2018 gymnastics included a mixed multi-discipline, multi-NOC team event.) | |
| Handball | Indoor handball | HBL | IHF | 2 | 2 | | |
| Hockey | Field hockey | HOC | FIH | 2 | | | |
| Hockey | Hockey5s | HO5 | FIH | | 2 | 2 | × |
| Karate | | KTE | WKF | | | 6 | × |
| Modern pentathlon | | MPN | UIPM | 3 | 3 | 3 | × |
| Rowing | Rowing | ROW | World Rowing | 4 | 4 | 4 | |
| Shooting | | SHO | ISSF | 4 | 6 | 6 | × |
| Skate sport | Inline speed skating | ISS | World Skate | | • | 2 | |
| Sport climbing | | CLB | IFSC | | • | 2 | × |
| Surfing | | SRF | ISA | | | | × |
| Tennis | | TEN | World Tennis | 4 | 5 | 5 | × |
| Volleyball | Indoor volleyball | VVO | FIVB | 2 | | | |
| Weightlifting | | WLF | IWF | 11 | 11 | 12 | x |
| Wrestling | Freestyle wrestling | WRE | UWW | 9 | 9 | 10 | |
| Wrestling | Greco-Roman wrestling | WRG | UWW | 5 | 5 | 9 | |
| Total events | | | | 202 | 220 | 243 | 151 |
| Total sports | | | | 33 | 35 | 41 | 25 |

==== Demonstration summer sports ====
Six sports have been demonstrated at the Summer Youth Olympics. Skateboarding, Sports Climbing, Inline Speed Skating, and Wushu were demonstrated at the 2014 games and included in subsequent editions. Three sports were demonstrated at the 2018 games and have not yet been included in subsequent editions:

- Karting (details)
- Polo (details)
- Squash (details)

=== Winter Youth Olympics ===
All sports on the core program of the Winter Olympics have been a part of every Winter Youth Olympics. In 2020, ski mountaineering was added as an optional sport (it was later added to the program of the 2026 Winter Olympics). The 2024 Winter Youth Olympics marked the first time at any Olympic Games that the program included an equal number of events for male and female athletes. No sports have been demonstrated at the Winter Youth Olympics. There have been 46 disciplines across 16 sports in the Winter Youth Olympics between the 2012 Games to the 2020 Games.

The following sports (or disciplines of a sport) make up the current and discontinued Winter Youth Olympic Games official program and are listed alphabetically according to the name used by the IOC. The discontinued sports were previously part of the Winter Youth Olympic Games program as official sports, but are no longer on the current program.

| Sport | Discipline | Code & Pictogram | Body | 12 | 16 | 20 | 24 | 28 |
|---|---|---|---|---|---|---|---|---|
| Biathlon | | BTH | BIU | 5 | 6 | 6 | 6 | 5 |
| Curling | | CUR | World Curling | 2 | 2 | 2 | 2 | 1 |
| IBSF sport | Bobsleigh | BOB | IBSF | 2 | 2 | 2 | 2 | 2 |
| IBSF sport | Skeleton | SKN | IBSF | 2 | 2 | 2 | 2 | 2 |
| Ice hockey | | IHO | IIHF | 4 | 4 | 4 | 4 | 2 |
| Luge | | LUG | FIL | 4 | 4 | 5 | 5 | 3 |
| Skating | Figure skating | FSK | ISU | 5 | 5 | 5 | 5 | 4 |
| Skating | Short track speed skating | STK | ISU | 5 | 5 | 5 | 7 | 7 |
| Skating | Speed skating | SSK | ISU | 8 | 7 | 7 | 7 | 7 |
| Skiing | Alpine skiing | ALP | FIS | 9 | 9 | 9 | 9 | 8 |
| Skiing | Cross-Country skiing | CCS | FIS | 4 | 6 | 6 | 5 | 5 |
| Skiing | Freestyle skiing | FRS | FIS | 4 | 6 | 8 | 12 | 13 |
| Skiing | Nordic combined | NCB | FIS | 1 | 2 | 3 | 3 | 3 |
| Skiing | Ski jumping | SJP | FIS | 3 | 3 | 3 | 3 | 3 |
| Skiing | Snowboarding | SBD | FIS | 4 | 7 | 9 | 9 | 9 |
| Ski mountaineering | | SMT | ISMF | | | 5 | | 5 |
| Total events | | | | 62 | 70 | 81 | 81 | 79 |
| Total sports | | | | 15 | 15 | 16 | 15 | 16 |

== Culture and education ==
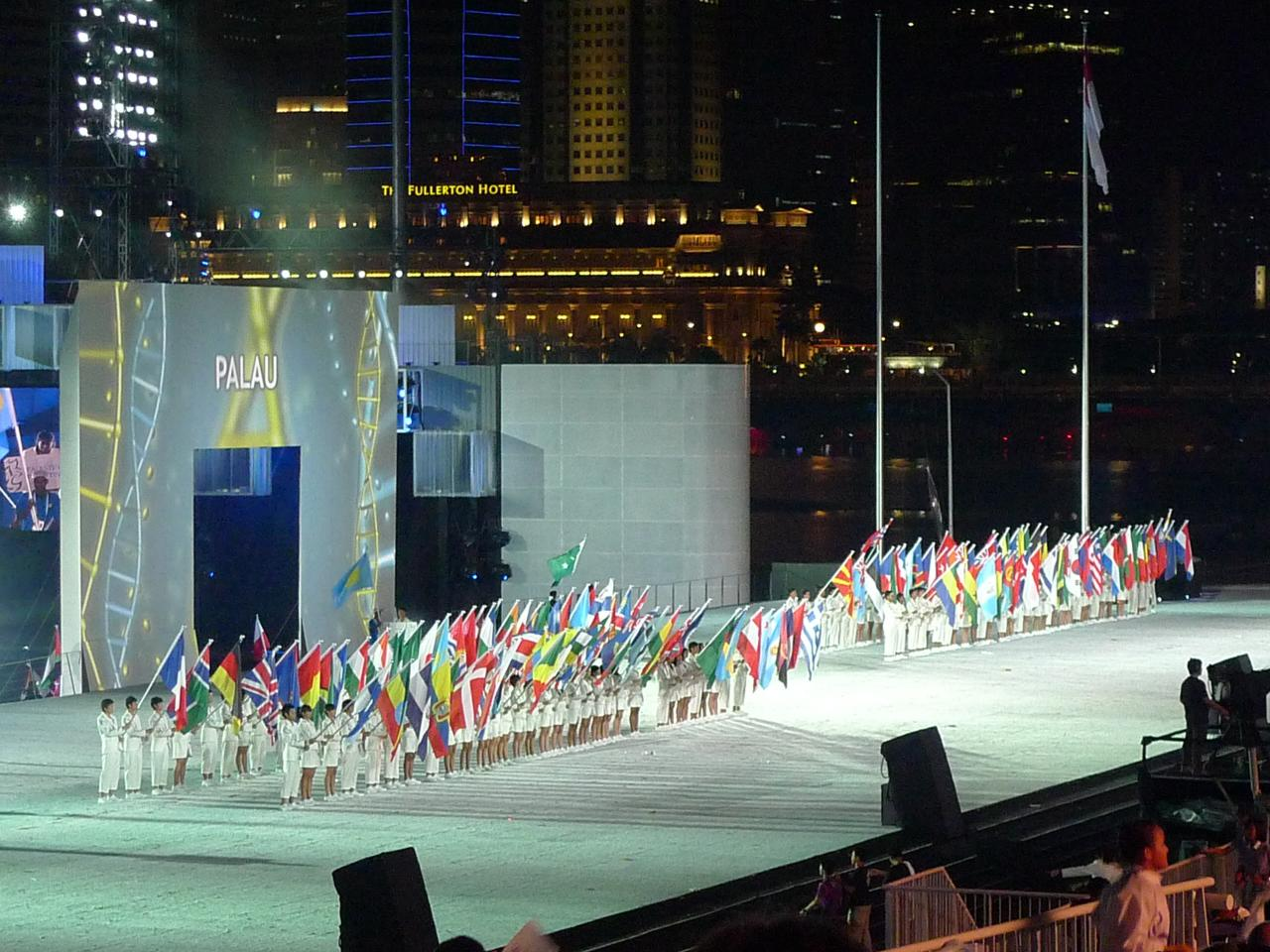
Flags of participating nations at the 2010 Summer Youth Olympics

Education and culture are also key components for the Youth edition. Not only does the education/culture aspect apply to athletes and participants, but also youth around the world and inhabitants of the host city and surrounding regions. To this end, a Culture and Education Program (CEP) will be featured at each Games. The first CEP at the 2010 Singapore Games featured events that fostered cooperation amongst athletes of different nations. It had classes on topics ranging from health and fitness to the environment and career planning. Local students from Singapore made booths at the World Culture Village that represented each of the 205 participating National Olympic Committee. The Chat with Champions sessions were the most popular portion of the program. Participants were invited to hear inspirational talks given by former and current Olympic athletes.

Also part of the CEP is the Young Ambassadors Programme, Young Reporters Programme and Athlete Role Models. Under the Young Ambassadors Programme, a group of youths aged 18 to 25 years old are nominated by the NOCs to help promote the YOG in their regions and communities, and encourage the athletes to participate in the CEP programmes.

The Young Reporters Programme provides journalism students or those who have recently started their journalism careers a cross-platform journalist-training programme and on-the-job experience during the YOG. Young Reporters, between the ages of 18 and 24, are selected by the Continental Associations of National Olympic Committees and will represent each of the five continents.

Acting as mentors to help support and advise young Olympians are the Athlete Role Models, who are typically active or recently retired Olympians nominated by the IFs, such as Japanese wrestler Kaori Icho, Italian Simone Farina and Namibian Frank Fredericks.

Emphasis on exchange goes beyond the CEP. Another unique feature of the Youth Olympic Games is mixed-gender and mixed-national teams. Triathlon relays, fencing, table tennis, archery and mixed swimming relays are a few of the sports in which athletes from different nations and mixed genders can compete together. YOG organizers are also using social media such as Facebook, Flickr, and Twitter as key platforms for engaging young athletes before, during, and after each celebration of the Games. Multi-lingual, multi-cultural, and multi-age requirements are the targets of the program, which stress the themes of "Learning to know, learning to be, learning to do, and learning to live together".

== Editions ==
In early November 2007, Athens, Bangkok, Singapore, Moscow, and Turin were selected by the IOC as the five candidate cities to host the inaugural Youth Olympic Games. In January 2008, the candidates were further pared down to just Moscow and Singapore. Finally, on 21 February 2008, Singapore was declared host of the inaugural Youth Olympic Games 2010 via live telecast from Lausanne, Switzerland, winning by a tally of 53 votes to 44 for Moscow.

On 2 September 2008, IOC announced that the executive board had shortlisted four cities among the candidates to host the first Winter Youth Olympic Games in 2012. The four candidate cities were Harbin, Innsbruck, Kuopio, and Lillehammer. IOC president Jacques Rogge appointed Pernilla Wiberg to chair the commission which analysed the projects. As with the Summer Games, the list was then shortened to two finalists, Innsbruck and Kuopio, in November 2008. On 12 December 2008, it was announced that Innsbruck beat Kuopio to host the games. Nanjing, China was selected by the IOC over Poznan, Poland to be the host-city of the 2014 Youth Olympics. The election was held on 10 February 2010, two days before the start of the 2010 Winter Olympics in Vancouver. Lillehammer, Norway hosted the 2016 Winter Youth Olympics.

=== Summer Youth Olympic Games ===
| Edition | Year | Host city | Host nation | Opened by | Start Date | End Date | Nations | Competitors | Sports | Events | Top of the medal table | Ref. |
|---|---|---|---|---|---|---|---|---|---|---|---|---|
| I | 2010 | Singapore | Singapore | President S. R. Nathan | 14 August | 26 August | 204 | 3,524 | 26 | 201 | China | |
| II | 2014 | Nanjing | China | President Xi Jinping | 16 August | 28 August | 203 | 3,579 | 28 | 222 | China | |
| III | 2018 | Buenos Aires | Argentina | President Mauricio Macri | 6 October | 18 October | 206 | 3,997 | 32 | 239 | Russia | |
| IV | 2026 (Note: The Games were originally scheduled for 2022, but they were postponed to 2026 due to the COVID-19 pandemic.) | Dakar | Senegal | President Bassirou Diomaye Faye | 31 October | 13 November | 205 | 2,654 | 25 | 151 | China | |
| V | 2030 | TBD | TBD | Future event | | | | | | | | |

Host cities of the Summer Youth Olympic Games

=== Winter Youth Olympic Games ===
| Edition | Year | Host city | Host nation | Opened by | Start Date | End Date | Nations | Competitors | Sports | Events | Top of the medal table | Ref. |
|---|---|---|---|---|---|---|---|---|---|---|---|---|
| I | 2012 | Innsbruck | Austria | President Heinz Fischer | 13 January | 22 January | 69 | 1,059 | 7 | 63 | Germany | |
| II | 2016 | Lillehammer | Norway | King Harald V | 12 February | 21 February | 71 | 1,100 | 7 | 70 | United States | |
| III | 2020 | Lausanne | Switzerland | President Simonetta Sommaruga | 9 January | 22 January | 79 | 1,872 | 8 | 81 | Russia | |
| IV | 2024 | Gangwon | South Korea | President Yoon Suk-yeol | 19 January | 1 February | 78 | 1,802 | 7 | 81 | Italy | |
| V | 2028 | Dolomites and Valtellina | Italy | Future event | 15 January | 29 January | Future event | | 8 | 79 | Future event | |

Host cities of the Winter Youth Olympic Games

== Medal table ==
| Rank | Nation | Gold | Silver | Bronze | Total |
|---|---|---|---|---|---|
| 1 | China | 105 | 59 | 41 | 205 |
| 2 | Russia | 96 | 74 | 58 | 228 |
| – | Mixed-NOCs | 48 | 46 | 52 | 146 |
| 3 | Japan | 46 | 46 | 38 | 130 |
| 4 | South Korea | 44 | 29 | 25 | 98 |
| 5 | United States | 39 | 42 | 36 | 117 |
| 6 | Italy | 39 | 37 | 38 | 114 |
| 7 | Germany | 38 | 47 | 48 | 133 |
| 8 | France | 32 | 33 | 42 | 107 |
| 9 | Hungary | 25 | 20 | 23 | 68 |
| 10 | Ukraine | 22 | 26 | 31 | 79 |
| 11–127 | Remaining | 429 | 494 | 587 | 1,510 |
| Totals (127 entries) | | 963 | 953 | 1,019 | 2,935 |

== See also ==
- 1998 World Youth Games
- International Children's Games (ages 12–15)
- Gymnasiade (ages 13–18)
- Universiade (ages 17–25)
- Youth (athletics)
- Commonwealth Youth Games
