= Azerbaijan at the Youth Olympics =

Performance of Azerbaijan at the Youth Olympic Games

- IOC code: AZE
- NOC: National Olympic Committee of the Azerbaijani Republic
- Website: www.noc-aze.org/en/ (in English)
- Medals Ranked 21st: Gold 12 Silver 10 Bronze 4 Total 26

Summer appearances
- 2010; 2014; 2018

Winter appearances
- 2020; 2024

Azerbaijan has participated at the Summer Youth Olympic Games in every edition since the inaugural 2010 Games and they participated the first time at the Winter Youth Olympic Games on 2020 Games.

== Medal tables ==
=== Medals by Summer Games ===
Games	Athletes	Gold	Silver	Bronze	Total	Rank
2010 Singapore	12	5	3	0	8	11
(China) 2014 Nanjing	21	5	6	1	12	10
(Argentina) 2018 Buenos Aires	17	2	1	3	6	35
(Senegal) 2026 Dakar						
Total		12	10	4	26	13

=== Medals by Winter Games ===
Games	Athletes	Gold	Silver	Bronze	Total	Rank
(Austria) 2012 Innsbruck	Didn't participate					
(Norway) 2016 Lillehammer	Didn't participate					
(Switzerland) 2020 Lausanne	1	0	0	0	0	-
(South Korea) 2024 Gangwon						
Total		0	0	0	0	-

=== Medals by Summer Sport ===
Sport	Gold	Silver	Bronze	Total
Wrestling	8	3	1	12
Boxing	1	2	1	4
Judo	1	2	0	3
Taekwondo	1	1	1	3
Weightlifting	1	1	0	2
Rowing	0	1	0	1
Athletics	0	0	1	1
Totals (7 entries)	12	10	4	26

=== Medals by Winter Sport ===
Sport	Gold	Silver	Bronze	Total
Totals (0 entries)	0	0	0	0

== List of medalists ==
=== Summer Games ===
Medal	Name	Games	Sport	Event
Gold	Murad Bazarov	2010 Singapore	Wrestling	Boys' Greco-Roman -42 kg
Gold	Elman Mukhtarov	2010 Singapore	Wrestling	Boys' Greco-Roman -50 kg
Gold	Patimat Bagomedova	2010 Singapore	Wrestling	Girls' Freestyle -52 kg
Gold	Nijat Rahimov	2010 Singapore	Weightlifting	Boys' -69 kg
Gold	Ali Magomedabirov	2010 Singapore	Wrestling	Boys' Freestyle -100 kg
Silver	Kanan Guliyev	2010 Singapore	Wrestling	Boys' Freestyle -54 kg
Silver	Salman Alizade	2010 Singapore	Boxing	Boys' -48 kg
Silver	Elvin Isayev	2010 Singapore	Boxing	Boys' -57 kg
Gold	Said Guliyev	(China) 2014 Nanjing	Taekwondo	Boys' -73 kg
Gold	Islambek Dadov	(China) 2014 Nanjing	Wrestling	Boys' Greco-Roman -69 kg
Gold	Rufat Huseynov	(China) 2014 Nanjing	Boxing	Boys' -49 kg
Gold	Teymur Mamedov	(China) 2014 Nanjing	Wrestling	Boys' Freestyle -63 kg
Gold	Igbal Hajizada	(China) 2014 Nanjing	Wrestling	Boys' Freestyle -100 kg
Silver	Natig Gurbanli	(China) 2014 Nanjing	Judo	Boys' -55 kg
Silver	Leyla Aliyeva	(China) 2014 Nanjing	Judo	Girls' -44 kg
Silver	Ceren Ozbek	(China) 2014 Nanjing	Taekwondo	Girls' -44 kg
Silver	Boris Yotov	(China) 2014 Nanjing	Rowing	Boys' single sculls
Silver	Jabbar Najafov	(China) 2014 Nanjing	Wrestling	Boys' Greco-Roman -50 kg
Silver	Leyla Gurbanova	(China) 2014 Nanjing	Wrestling	Girls' Freestyle -52 kg
Bronze	Nazim Babayev	(China) 2014 Nanjing	Athletics	Boys' triple jump
Gold	Vugar Talibov	(Argentina) 2018 Buenos Aires	Judo	Boys' -66 kg
Gold	Turan Bayramov	(Argentina) 2018 Buenos Aires	Wrestling	Boys' Freestyle -65 kg
Silver	Tarmenkhan Babayev	(Argentina) 2018 Buenos Aires	Weightlifting	Boys' -85 kg
Bronze	Javad Aghayev	(Argentina) 2018 Buenos Aires	Taekwondo	Boys' -63 kg
Bronze	Shahana Nazarova	(Argentina) 2018 Buenos Aires	Wrestling	Girls' Freestyle -43 kg
Bronze	Nurlan Safarov	(Argentina) 2018 Buenos Aires	Boxing	Boys' -60 kg

=== Summer Games medalists as part of Mixed-NOCs Team ===
Medal	Name	Games	Sport	Event
Gold	Yelyzaveta Luzan	(Argentina) 2018 Buenos Aires	Gymnastics	Mixed multi-discipline team

== Flag bearers ==
#	Games	Season	Flag bearer	Sport
4	2020 Lausanne	Winter	Ekaterina Ryabova	Figure skating
3	2018 Buenos Aires	Summer	Nurlan Safarov	Boxing
2	2014 Nanjing	Summer	Igbal Hajizada	Wrestling
1	2010 Singapore	Summer	Shaban Shahpalangov	Boxing

== See also ==
- Azerbaijan at the Olympics
- Azerbaijan at the Paralympics
