= Rowing at the Summer Youth Olympics =

Rowing events

- Governing body: FISA
- Events: 4 (men: 2; women: 2)

Games
- 2010; 2014; 2018

Rowing has featured as a sport at the Youth Olympic Summer Games since its first edition in 2010. The Youth Olympic Games are multi-sport event and the games are held every four years just like the Olympic Games. Summer Youth Olympics racing is held over a 1000m course as opposed to the 2000m course used at the Olympics. In 2026, coastal rowing was held instead of standard rowing.

== Summary ==
| Games | Year | Events | Best Nation |
|---|---|---|---|
| 1 | 2010 | 4 | Germany |
| 2 | 2014 | 4 | Romania |
| 3 | 2018 | 4 | Argentina |
| 4 | 2026 | 3 | China |

== Medal table ==
As of the 2018 Summer Youth Olympics.

| Rank | Nation | Gold | Silver | Bronze | Total |
|---|---|---|---|---|---|
| 1 | Germany | 2 | 2 | 0 | 4 |
| 2 | Romania | 2 | 1 | 2 | 5 |
| 3 | China | 2 | 1 | 0 | 3 |
| 4 | Greece | 1 | 2 | 1 | 4 |
| 5 | Belarus | 1 | 1 | 0 | 2 |
| 5 | Ukraine | 1 | 1 | 0 | 2 |
| 7 | Argentina | 1 | 0 | 1 | 2 |
| 8 | Great Britain | 1 | 0 | 0 | 1 |
| 8 | Italy | 1 | 0 | 0 | 1 |
| 8 | Lithuania | 1 | 0 | 0 | 1 |
| 8 | Slovenia | 1 | 0 | 0 | 1 |
| 8 | South Africa | 1 | 0 | 0 | 1 |
| 13 | Czech Republic | 0 | 2 | 0 | 2 |
| 14 | Australia | 0 | 1 | 2 | 3 |
| 15 | Spain | 0 | 1 | 1 | 2 |
| 16 | Austria | 0 | 1 | 0 | 1 |
| 16 | Azerbaijan | 0 | 1 | 0 | 1 |
| 16 | Sweden | 0 | 1 | 0 | 1 |
| 19 | France | 0 | 0 | 3 | 3 |
| 20 | Canada | 0 | 0 | 2 | 2 |
| 21 | Estonia | 0 | 0 | 1 | 1 |
| 21 | Hungary | 0 | 0 | 1 | 1 |
| 21 | Turkey | 0 | 0 | 1 | 1 |
| Totals (23 entries) | | 15 | 15 | 15 | 45 |

== Participating nations ==
| Nation | 10 | 14 | 18 | Years |
|---|---|---|---|---|
| Albania | 1 | | | 1 |
| Algeria | | 2 | 2 | 4 |
| Argentina | | 2 | 3 | 5 |
| Australia | 4 | 3 | 2 | 9 |
| Austria | 2 | 2 | | 4 |
| Azerbaijan | | 1 | | 1 |
| Belgium | 2 | 1 | 1 | 4 |
| Belarus | 2 | 1 | 1 | 4 |
| Brazil | 1 | 2 | 1 | 4 |
| Bulgaria | 4 | 1 | | 5 |
| Canada | | 3 | 1 | 4 |
| Chile | | 4 | 4 | 8 |
| China | 2 | 2 | 3 | 7 |
| Croatia | 3 | 3 | 4 | 10 |
| Cuba | 1 | 2 | 2 | 5 |
| Czech Republic | 2 | 3 | 3 | 8 |
| Denmark | 1 | 1 | | 2 |
| Egypt | | 4 | 2 | 6 |
| El Salvador | 1 | 1 | | 2 |
| Spain | 3 | 2 | 1 | 6 |
| Estonia | 1 | | 1 | 2 |
| France | 3 | 2 | 1 | 6 |
| Great Britain | 4 | 2 | 3 | 9 |
| Germany | 2 | 3 | 3 | 8 |
| Greece | 4 | 3 | 3 | 10 |
| Hong Kong | | | 1 | 1 |
| Hungary | 3 | | | 3 |
| Indonesia | | 1 | | 1 |
| India | 4 | 2 | 2 | 8 |
| Ireland | 1 | 1 | | 2 |
| Italy | 4 | 3 | 4 | 11 |
| Japan | 1 | 1 | 1 | 3 |
| Latvia | 1 | | | 1 |
| Lithuania | 1 | 2 | 2 | 5 |
| Moldova | | | 1 | 1 |
| Mexico | | | 3 | 3 |
| Netherlands | 2 | | 2 | 4 |
| Norway | | 2 | 1 | 3 |
| New Zealand | 3 | 3 | | 6 |
| Paraguay | | 1 | | 1 |
| Peru | | 1 | 1 | 2 |
| Poland | 1 | 3 | | 4 |
| Portugal | 1 | | | 1 |
| North Korea | | 1 | | 1 |
| Romania | 2 | | | 2 |
| Romania | 1 | 4 | 4 | 9 |
| South Africa | 2 | | 2 | 4 |
| Russia | 2 | | | 2 |
| Singapore | 2 | | | 2 |
| Slovenia | 4 | 2 | 1 | 7 |
| Serbia | 3 | 1 | | 4 |
| Sri Lanka | | 1 | | 1 |
| Sudan | 2 | | | 2 |
| Switzerland | 1 | | 2 | 3 |
| Sweden | 1 | | 1 | 2 |
| Thailand | | | 2 | 2 |
| Togo | | 1 | | 1 |
| Tunisia | 1 | 2 | | 3 |
| Turkey | 3 | 2 | 2 | 7 |
| Uganda | | 1 | | 1 |
| Ukraine | 2 | 2 | 1 | 5 |
| Uruguay | | | 1 | 1 |
| United States | | 4 | 2 | 6 |
| Uzbekistan | | 2 | 3 | 5 |
| Vietnam | | 1 | | 1 |
| Zimbabwe | | 2 | | 2 |
Rowers
| Singles - Male | 21 | 24 | 16 | 61 |
| Singles - Female | 22 | 24 | 16 | 62 |
| Doubles - Male | 24 | 24 | 24 | 72 |
| Doubles - Female | 24 | 24 | 24 | 72 |
| Rowers - Male | 45 | 48 | 40 | 133 |
| Rowers - Female | 46 | 48 | 40 | 134 |
| Rowers - Total | 91 | 96 | 80 | 267 |
Boats
| Boats | 67 | 72 | 56 | 195 |
Nations
| Continents | | | | |
| Countries | 43 | 48 | 40 | 131 |
| New Countries | 43 | 18 | 5 | 66 |
| Year | 10 | 14 | 18 | |

== Medalists ==
=== 2010 Youth Olympic Games Events ===
| Games | Gold | Silver | Bronze |
|---|---|---|---|
| Female Single Sculls | Judith Sievers; Germany | Nataliia Kovalova; Ukraine | Noémie Kober; France |
| Female Pair | Great Britain; Georgia Howard-Merrill; Fiona Gammond | Australia; Emma Basher; Olympia Aldersey | Greece; Eleni Diamnti; Lydia Ntalamagka |
| Male Single Sculls | Rolandas Maščinskas; Lithuania | Felix Bach; Germany | Ioan Prundeanu; Romania |
| Male Pair | Slovenia; Jure Grace; Grega Domanjko | Greece; Michalis Nastopoulos; Apostolos Lampridis | Australia; Matthew Chochran; David Watts |

=== 2014 Youth Olympic Games Events ===
| Games | Gold | Silver | Bronze |
|---|---|---|---|
| Male Single Sculls | Tim Ole Naske; Germany | Boris Yotov; Azerbaijan | Dan de Groot; Canada |
| Male Pairs | Romania; Gheorghe Robert Dedu; Ciprian Tudosă | Czech Republic; Miroslav Jech; Lukáš Helešic | Turkey; Gökhan Güven; Eren Can Aslan |
| Female Single Sculls | Krystsina Staraselets; Belarus | Athina Angelopoulou; Greece | Camille Juillet; France |
| Female Pairs | Romania; Cristina Georgiana Popescu; Denisa Tîlvescu | China; Luo Yadan; Pan Jie | Canada; Larissa Werbicki; Caileigh Filmer |

=== 2018 Youth Olympic Games Events ===
| Event | Gold | Silver | Bronze |
|---|---|---|---|
| Boys' Single Sculls | Ivan Tyshchenko; Ukraine | Ivan Brynza; Belarus | Cormac Kennedy-Leverett; Australia |
| Boys' Pairs | Italy; Alberto Zamariola; Nicolas Castelnovo | Romania; Florin Nicolae Arteni-Fîntînariu; Alexandru Danciu | Argentina; Felipe Modarelli; Tomas Herrera |
| Girls' Single Sculls | Maria Sol Ordas; Argentina | Elin Lindroth; Sweden | Greta Jaanson; Estonia |
| Girls' Pairs | Greece; Maria Kyridou; Christina Bourmpou | Czech Republic; Anna Šantrůčková; Eliška Podrazilová | Romania; Tabita Maftei; Alina Maria Balețchi |

=== 2026 Youth Olympic Games Events ===
| Event | Gold | Silver | Bronze |
|---|---|---|---|
| Boys' Solo | Callum Dreyer; South Africa | Diego Molina; Spain | Adam Moor; Hungary |
| Girls' Solo | Lili Liu; China | Carolina Guerra Gonzalez; Germany | Blanca López Valera; Spain |
| Mixed Double Sculls | China; Juntao Su; Lili Liu | Austria; Lukas Schoenhuber; Alena Lux | France; Elisa Guilloton; Raphael de Boussac |

== See also ==
- Rowing at the Summer Olympics
