= Azerbaijan at the 2018 Summer Youth Olympics =

- IOC code: AZE
- NOC: National Olympic Committee of the Azerbaijani Republic
- Website: http://www.noc-aze.org/

in Buenos Aires, Argentina 6 – 18 October 2018
- Competitors: 17 in 9 sports
- Medals Ranked 35th: Gold 2 Silver 1 Bronze 3 Total 6

Summer Youth Olympics appearances (overview)
- 2010; 2014; 2018

Azerbaijan participated at the 2018 Summer Youth Olympics in Buenos Aires, Argentina from 6 October to 18 October 2018.

== Medalists ==
Medals awarded to participants of mixed-NOC (combined) teams are represented in italics. These medals are not counted towards the individual NOC medal tally.

Medal	Name	Sport	Event	Date
Gold	Vugar Talibov	Judo	Boys' -66 kg	7 October
Gold	Yelyzaveta Luzan	Gymnastics	Mixed multi-discipline team (in mixed-NOC team with Team Simone Biles)	10 October
Gold	Turan Bayramov	Wrestling	Boys' freestyle -65 kg	14 October
Silver	Tarmenkhan Babayev	Weightlifting	-85 kg	12 October
Bronze	Javad Aghayev	Taekwondo	Boys' -63 kg	9 October
Bronze	Shahana Nazarova	Wrestling	Girls' freestyle -43 kg	13 October
Bronze	Nurlan Safarov	Boxing	Boys' 60 kg	18 October

== Competitors ==
Sport	Boys	Girls	Total
Athletics	1	1	2
Boxing	2	0	2
Gymnastics	1	1	2
Judo	1	1	2
Swimming	1	0	1
Table tennis	1	1	2
Taekwondo	1	1	2
Weightlifting	1	1	2
Wrestling	1	1	2
Total	9	8	17

== Boxing ==
Athlete	Event	Preliminary R1	Preliminary R2	Semifinals	Final / RM	Rank
Athlete	Event	Opposition Result	Opposition Result	Opposition Result	Opposition Result	Rank
Nurlan Safarov	-60 kg	Wilcox (CAN); W 3–2	—N/a	Phoemsap (THA); L 0–5	Mamdouh (EGY); W 4–0	3rd place, bronze medalist(s)
Nijat Hasanov	-69 kg	Tauta (ASA); W RSC	—N/a	Elouarz (MAR); L 1–4	Rakhmonov (UZB); L 0–5	4

== Gymnastics ==
=== Artistic ===
Azerbaijan qualified one gymnast based on its performance at the 2018 European Junior Championship.

- Boys' artistic individual all-around - 1 quota

=== Rhythmic ===
Azerbaijan qualified one rhythmic gymnast based on its performance at the European qualification event.

- Girls' rhythmic individual all-around - 1 quota

== Judo ==
Individual

Athlete	Event	Round of 16	Quarterfinals	Semifinals	Rep 1	Rep 2	Rep 3	Final / BM	
Athlete	Event	Opposition Result	Opposition Result	Opposition Result	Opposition Result	Opposition Result	Opposition Result	Opposition Result	Rank
Vusala Karimova	Girls' 44 kg	Aleksa Georgieva (BUL); W 10-00	Ana Viktorija Puljiz (CRO); L 00s1-01	did not advance	Bye	Yangchen Wangmo (BHU); W 10-00	Erza Muminoviq (KOS); L 00s2-10s2	did not advance	
Vugar Talibov	Boys' 66 kg	Ahad Al-Sagheer (YEM); W 10-00	Jamshed Sulaimoni (TJK); W 01s1-00s2	Antonio Tornal (DOM); W 01s2-00s1	Bye			Abrek Naguchev (RUS); W 10-00	1st place, gold medalist(s)

Team

Athletes	Event	Round of 16	Quarterfinals	Semifinals	Final	
Athletes	Event	Opposition Result	Opposition Result	Opposition Result	Opposition Result	Rank
Team Nanjing; Hasret Bozkurt (TUR); Joaquín Burgos (ARG); Nilufar Ermaganbetova (UZB); Rihari Iki (NZL); Alaa Mousaad Mohamed (EGY); Eva Pérez Soler (ESP); Vugar Talibov (AZE); Romain Valadier-Picard (FRA)	Mixed Team	—N/a	Team Beijing (MIX); L 3–4	did not advance		
Team Atlanta; Tiguidanke Camara (GUI); Aleksa Georgieva (BUL); Vusala Karimova (AZE); Adrián Medero (PUR); Rok Pogorevc (SLO); Fatine Rzal (MAR); Adrian Sulca (ROU); Antonio Tornal (DOM)	Mixed Team	Team Barcelona (MIX); W 4–3	Team Barcelona (MIX); L 3–4	did not advance		

== Taekwondo ==
Athlete	Event	Round of 16	Quarterfinals	Semifinals	Final	
Athlete	Event	Opposition Result	Opposition Result	Opposition Result	Opposition Result	Rank
Javad Aghayev	Boys' 63 kg	Stephen Chol Atem (SSD); W DSQ	Hamed Asghari Mahiabadi (IRI); W 9-8	Cho Won-hee (KOR); L 13-15	did not advance	3rd place, bronze medalist(s)
Minaya Akbarova	Girls' 44 kg	Assel Usmanova (KAZ); L 9-14	did not advance			

== Table tennis ==
Azerbaijan qualified one table tennis players based on its performance at the European Continental Qualifier and the “Road to Buenos Aires” qualification tournament.

Singles

Athlete	Event	Group Stage	Rank	Round of 16	Quarterfinals	Semifinals	Final / BM	Rank
Athlete	Event	Opposition Score	Rank	Opposition Score	Opposition Score	Opposition Score	Opposition Score	Rank
Yu Khinhang	Boys' singles	Group G Abdel-Aziz (EGY); L 1–4	3	did not advance				17
Yu Khinhang	Boys' singles	Xu (NZL); W 4–1	3	did not advance				17
Yu Khinhang	Boys' singles	Pletea (ROU); L 1–4	3	did not advance				17
Ning Jing	Girls' singles	Group C Su (TPE); L 3–4	2Q	Díaz (PUR); W 4–1	Kamath (IND); L 3–4	did not advance		5
Ning Jing	Girls' singles	Oribamise (NGR); W 4–0	2Q	Díaz (PUR); W 4–1	Kamath (IND); L 3–4	did not advance		5
Ning Jing	Girls' singles	Dragoman (ROU); W 4–2	2Q	Díaz (PUR); W 4–1	Kamath (IND); L 3–4	did not advance		5

Team

Athletes	Event	Group Stage	Rank	Round of 16	Quarterfinals	Semifinals	Final / BM	Rank
Athletes	Event	Opposition Score	Rank	Opposition Score	Opposition Score	Opposition Score	Opposition Score	Rank
Azerbaijan; Yu Khinhang (AZE); Ning Jing (AZE)	Mixed international team	Group F India; Thakkar (IND); Kamath (IND); W 3–0	1Q	United States; Jha (USA); Wang (USA); W 2–1	Japan; Harimoto (JPN); Hirano (JPN); L 0–2	did not advance		5
Azerbaijan; Yu Khinhang (AZE); Ning Jing (AZE)	Mixed international team	Intercontinental 5 Lorenzo (ARG); Morri (SMR); W 3–0	1Q	United States; Jha (USA); Wang (USA); W 2–1	Japan; Harimoto (JPN); Hirano (JPN); L 0–2	did not advance		5
Azerbaijan; Yu Khinhang (AZE); Ning Jing (AZE)	Mixed international team	France; Rembert (FRA); Gauthier (FRA); W 3–0	1Q	United States; Jha (USA); Wang (USA); W 2–1	Japan; Harimoto (JPN); Hirano (JPN); L 0–2	did not advance		5

== Weightlifting ==
Azerbaijan qualified one athlete based on its performance at the 2017 World Youth Championships.

Boy

Athlete	Event	Snatch		Clean & Jerk		Total	Rank
Athlete	Event	Result	Rank	Result	Rank	Total	Rank
Tarmenkhan Babayev	−85 kg	142	2	174	2	316	2nd place, silver medalist(s)

Girl

Athlete	Event	Snatch		Clean & jerk		Total	Rank
Athlete	Event	Result	Rank	Result	Rank	Total	Rank
Lala Rzazade	−58 kg	67	6	80	6	147	6

== Wrestling ==
Key:
- VFA – Victory by Fall
- VSU – Without any points scored by the opponent
- VSU1 – With point(s) scored by the opponent
- VPO – Without any points scored by the opponent
- VPO1 – With point(s) scored by the opponent

Athlete	Event	Group stage					Final / RM	Rank
Athlete	Event	Opposition Score	Opposition Score	Opposition Score	Opposition Score	Rank	Opposition Score	Rank
Turan Bayramov	Boys' freestyle −65kg	Ainsley (NZL); W 10 – 0 ^{VSU}	Ullah (PAK); W 8 – 0 ^{VPO}	—N/a		1 Q	Karimi (IRI); W 6 – 1 ^{VPO1}	1st place, gold medalist(s)
Shahana Nazarova	Girls' freestyle −43kg	Martinez (BRA); W 11 – 0 ^{VFA}	Ogunsanya (NGR); W 6 – 0 ^{VFA}	Shilson (USA); L 2 – 12 ^{VSU1}	Vigouroux (FRA); W 1 – 0 ^{VPO}	2 Q	Batbaatar (MGL); W 7 – 6 ^{VPO1}	3rd place, bronze medalist(s)
