= 2014 World Rowing Junior Championships =

International rowing championships

- Venue: Hamburg-Allermöhe water sports center
- Location: Hamburg, Germany
- Dates: 6–10 August

The 48th World Rowing Junior Championships were held from 6 to 10 August 2014 at the Hamburg-Allermöhe water sports center in Hamburg, Germany.

== Medal summary ==
=== Men's events ===
Event	Gold		Silver		Bronze	
Single scull (JM1x)	Tim Ole Naske; Germany	8:17.69	Daniel de Groot; Canada	8:38.17	Daniel Watkins; South Africa	8:44.29
Coxless pair (JM2-)	Czech Republic; Miroslav Jech; Lukáš Helešic	7:14.50	Romania; Mihaita Iliut; Alexandru-Cosmin Macovei	7:20.49	Austria; Christoph Seifriedsberger; Ferdinand Querfeld	7:27.15
Double scull (JM2x)	Germany; Philipp Syring; Max Appel	7:23.96	Lithuania; Dovydas Nemeravičius; Armandas Kelmelis	7:36.26	Australia; Tyron Boorman; Adam Bakker	7:37.57
Coxless four (JM4-)	Germany; Olaf Roggensack; René Schmela; Wolf-Niclas Schröder; Paul Gebauer	6:47.40	Romania; Robert-Ovidiu Grosan; Cosmin Pascari; Constantin Radu; Sergiu Bejan	6:58.15	Croatia; Toni Čavka; Filip Pedić; Bernard Samardžić; Josip Banović	7:00.48
Coxed four (JM4+)	Italy; Dario Favilli; Andrea Cattaneo; Andrea Maestrale; Ivan Capuano; Francesco Tassia (cox)	6:50.84	Great Britain; Charles Elwes; Thomas Digby; Chetan Chauhan-Sims; Charles Thurston; Hugo Marsh (cox)	6:56.24	New Zealand; Hugo Elworthy; William Morris-Whyte; Thomas Mackintosh; Edwin Laver; Matthew Wylie (cox)	6:58.76
Quad scull (JM4x)	Germany; Henrik Runge; David Junge; Johannes Lotz; Hannes Redenius	6:44.05	Great Britain; Steven Parsonage; Rowan Law; Samuel Meijer; Chris Lawrie	6:46.42	New Zealand; Jack O'Leary; Ari Palsson; Oliver Stephens; Sean Giblot Ducray	6:54.96
Eight (JM8+)	Germany; Nick Blankenburg; Janek Schirrmacher; Johannes Rentz; Philipp Nonnast; Johann Wahmhoff; Marc Leske; Alexander Vollmer; David Wollschlaeger; Mario Acosta Dominguez (cox)	6:15.61	Netherlands; Melvin Twellaar; Jeroen Oortwijn; Jaap de Jong; Koen van den Herik; Maarten Hurkmans; Simon van Dorp; Roel van Broekhuizen; Max Ponsen; Just Ponsen (cox)	6:18.32	Italy; Riccardo Mager; Riccardo Peretti; Alessandro Piffaretti; Raffele Giulivo; Leonardo Calabrese; Simone Tettamanti; Leonardo Pietra Caprina; Neri Muccini; Niccolo Mancusi (cox)	6:21.64

=== Women's events ===
Event	Gold		Silver		Bronze	
JW1x	Melanie Göldner; Germany	9:45.11	Camille Juillet; France	9:55.20	Marieke Keijser; Netherlands	9:55.46
JW2-	Romania; Beatrice-Madalina Pascari; Roxana Parascanu	8:09.32	Canada; Larissa Werbicki; Caileigh Filmer	8:13.66	United States; Meghan Galloway; Liliane Lindsay	8:24.76
JW2x	Romania; Elena Logofătu; Nicoleta Pașcanu	8:19.15	Germany; Tina Christmann; Franziska Kampmann	8:24.34	Greece; Aikaterini Zerva; Athina-Maria Angelopoulou	8:34.88
JW4-	China; Qian Wei; Jiayin Wang; Mengke Ji; Hanwen Cui	7:44.64	United States; Mia Croonquist; Dana Moffat; Claire Collins; Marlee Blue	7:46.68	Italy; Beatrice Millo; Nicoletta Bartalesi; Angelica Merlini; Andrea Jorio Fili	7:51.76
JW4x	China; Mingna Kuang; Meng Zhao; Jing Chen; Dongfang Zhao	7:26.48	Germany; Annemieke Schanze; Anne-Kathrin Eichler; Lena Seuffert; Frieda Hämmerling	7:31.52	Great Britain; Suzannah Duncan; Charlotte Hodgkins-Byrne; Anna Thornton; Florence Pickles	7:41.08
JW8+	Germany; Vera Spanke; Carlotta Schmitz; Sina Kühne; Sophie Gnauck; Bea Bliemel; Juliane Faralisch; Charlotte Zeiz; Anna Calina Schanze; Larina Hillemann (cox)	7:15.37	Russia; Aleksandra Tsypkina; Maria Aripova; Kira Yuvchenko; Kira Frolova; Ekaterina Sevostianova; Evgenia Ryskova; Iulia Solomentseva; Elizaveta Kornienko; Anastasia Bazhenova (cox)	7:23.15	Romania; Paula Logofătu; Diana Mihai; Andreea-Ioana Budeanu; Anamaria Zaharia; Anca-Elena Filip; Raluca-Mihaela Munteanu; Ionela-Mădălina Petreanu; Iuliana Crefelian; Georgiana-Lorena Palasca (cox)	7:26.71

== See also ==
- 2014 World Rowing Championships
- 2014 World Rowing U23 Championships
