= Cristina Popescu =

Cristina Popescu may refer to:

- Cristina Popescu (rower) (born 1996), Romanian Olympic rower
- Cristina Popescu (tennis) (born 1969), Romanian-born Canadian tennis player
