= Pakistan at the 2018 Summer Youth Olympics =

- IOC code: PAK
- NOC: Pakistan Olympic Association
- Website: http://www.nocpakistan.org/

in Buenos Aires, Argentina 6 – 18 October 2018
- Competitors: 3 in 3 sports
- Medals Ranked 83rd: Gold 0 Silver 0 Bronze 1 Total 1

Summer Youth Olympics appearances
- 2010; 2014; 2018; 2026

Pakistan participated at the 2018 Summer Youth Olympics in Buenos Aires, Argentina from 6 October to 18 October 2018. Wrestler Inayat Ullah made history by winning Pakistan's first ever individual medal in the history of Youth Olympic Games. He defeated his American opponent in the bronze medal bout to ensure the podium finish.

== Medalists ==
Medal	Name	Sport	Event	Date
Bronze	Inayat Ullah	Wrestling	Boys' freestyle −65kg	14 October

== Competitors ==
Sport	Boys	Girls	Total
Shooting	0	1	1
Weightlifting	1	0	1
Wrestling	1	0	1
Total	2	1	3

== Shooting ==
Pakistan was given a quota by the tripartite committee to compete in shooting.

Individual

Athlete	Event	Qualification		Final	
Athlete	Event	Points	Rank	Points	Rank
Nubaira Babur	Girls' 10 metre air pistol	518-6x	20	did not advance	

Team

Athletes	Event	Qualification		Round of 16	Quarterfinals	Semifinals	Final / BM	Rank
Athletes	Event	Points	Rank	Opposition Result	Opposition Result	Opposition Result	Opposition Result	Rank
Nubaira Babur (PAK); Saurabh Chaudhary (IND)	Mixed 10 metre air pistol	738-18x	15Q	Štrbac (CRO); Kurdzi (BLR); L 3 – 10	did not advance			17

== Weightlifting ==
Pakistan was given a quota by the tripartite committee to compete in weightlifting.

Athlete	Event	Snatch		Clean & Jerk		Total	Rank
Athlete	Event	Result	Rank	Result	Rank	Total	Rank
Farhan Amjad	Boys' −85 kg	113	6	140	6	253	6

== Wrestling ==
Key:
- VSU – Without any points scored by the opponent
- VSU1 – With point(s) scored by the opponent
- VPO – Without any points scored by the opponent
- VPO1 – With point(s) scored by the opponent

Athlete	Event	Group stage			Final / RM	Rank
Athlete	Event	Opposition Score	Opposition Score	Rank	Opposition Score	Rank
Inayat Ullah	Boys' freestyle −65kg	Ainsley (NZL); W 13 – 2 ^{VSU1}	Bayramov (AZE); L 0 – 8 ^{VPO}	2 Q	Manville (USA); W 6 – 2 ^{VPO1}	3rd place, bronze medalist(s)
