= 2013 World Rowing Junior Championships =

- Venue: Trakai Rowing Centre
- Location: Trakai, Lithuania
- Dates: 7–11 August

The 47th World Rowing Junior Championships were held from 7 to 11 August 2013 at the Trakai Rowing Centre in Trakai, Lithuania.

== Medal summary ==
=== Men's events ===
| Event | Gold | | Silver | | Bronze | |
|---|---|---|---|---|---|---|
| Single scull (JM1x) | Natan Węgrzycki-Szymczyk; Poland | 6:59.69 | Andrija Šljukić; Serbia | 7:01.49 | Boris Yotov; Azerbaijan | 7:09.54 |
| Coxless pair (JM2-) | Germany; Malte Großmann; Michael Trebbow | 6:35.22 | Greece; Georgios Papasakelariou; Michail Kouskouridas | 6:36.92 | Slovenia; Miha Ramšak; Gašper Ferlinc | 6:38.22 |
| Double scull (JM2x) | Germany; Philipp Syring; Tim Ole Naske | 6:27.20 | Romania; Marian Enache; Gheorghe-Robert Dedu | 6:30.12 | Poland; Marcin Pawłowski; Dominik Czaja | 6:32.48 |
| Coxless four (JM4-) | Romania; Mihaita Iliut; Alexandru-Cosmin Macovei; Danut-Viorel Rusu; Cristian Ivascu | 6:01.41 | Italy; Lorenzo Pietra Caprina; Giovanni Abagnale; Luca Lovisolo; Alberto Di Seyssel | 6:03.55 | Poland; Damian Krawitowski; Michał Zaporowski; Michał Iskra; Łukasz Krajewski | 6:09.01 |
| Coxed four (JM4+) | Italy; Antonio Vicino; Jacopo Mancini; Niccolo Pagani; Davide Gerosa; Niccolo Mancusi (cox) | 6:22.28 | Germany; Nick Blankenburg; Maximilian Wagner; Wolf-Niclas Schröder; David Wollschläger; Philipp Baumgard (cox) | 6:23.69 | Belarus; Maksim Tserashkou; Mikita Beliakou; Yauhen Slizh; Viktar Tryzna; Mikalai Suzko (cox) | 6:24.24 |
| Quad scull (JM4x) | Germany; Georg Teichmann; Alex Sievers; Hannes Redenius; Max Appel | 5:57.87 | New Zealand; Jack O'Leary; Martyn Davenport; Benjamin Crosbie; Mitchell Mackenzie-Mol | 5:59.97 | China; Ha Zang; Jixiang Yin; Xulin Ni; Yaxin Fu | 6:02.09 |
| Eight (JM8+) | Germany; Maximilian Brosche; Johann Wahmhoff; Richard Bensmann; Laurits Follert; Anton Schulz; Marc Leske; Theo Kessner; Paul Gebauer; Mario Acosta Dominguez (cox) | 5:50.05 | Italy; Andrea Maestrale; Lorenzo Gerosa; Alessandro Piffaretti; Emanuele Fiume; Vittorio Serralunga; Simone Tettamanti; Leonardo Pietra Caprina; Neri Muccini; Patrick Rocek (cox) | 5:50.06 | Serbia; Uroš Marinković; Bojan Došljak; Nikola Kekić; Nikola Selaković; Ljubomir Gavric; Martin Mačković; Viktor Pivač; Aleksa Stanković; Mateja Josič (cox) | 5:50.28 |

=== Women's events ===
| Event | Gold | | Silver | | Bronze | |
|---|---|---|---|---|---|---|
| JW1x | Jessica Leyden; Great Britain | 7:49.96 | Tatsiana Klimovich; Belarus | 7:53.09 | Élodie Ravera-Scaramozzino; France | 7:55.09 |
| JW2- | Australia; Jessie Allen; Genevieve Horton | 7:22.50 | Romania; Cristina Popescu; Denisa Tîlvescu | 7:24.13 | Spain; Mireia Ros Martínez; Laura Monteso Esmel | 7:28.29 |
| JW2x | Romania; Elena Logofătu; Nicoleta Pașcanu | 7:07.72 | Australia; Narelle Badenoch; Eleni Kalimnios | 7:10.82 | Denmark; Mathilde Persson; Ida Jacobsen | 7:13.90 |
| JW4- | United States; Eliza Spillsbury; Galen Hughes; Sylvie Sallquist; Caroline Hart | 6:53.85 | Italy; Giulia Campioni; Elena Waiglein; Carmela Pappalardo; Ludovica Serafini | 6:54.23 | Germany; Christiane Estel; Stella-Izabell Bleich; Sophie Oksche; Charlotte Wesselmann | 6:56.29 |
| JW4x | Italy; Valentina Rodini; Valentina Iseppi; Stefania Gobbi; Chiara Ondoli | 6:34.44 | United States; Shawna Sims; Elizabeth Sharis; Kendall Brewer; Cicely Madden | 6:35.33 | Germany; Kathrin Morbe; Lena Seuffert; Frauke Hacker; Frauke Hundeling | 6:36.74 |
| JW8+ | Romania; Gianina van Groningen; Andrea-Maria Sticea; Antonia Cerbu; Roxana Parascanu; Ana-Maria Boca; Elena Turta; Cristina Popescu; Denisa Tîlvescu; Georgiana Danciu (cox) | 6:27.70 | Germany; Leonie Neuhaus; Julia Barz; Alia Koné; Annika Jacobs; Josephine Eich; Friederike Reißig; Dorothee Beckendorff; Lisa Quattelbaum; Larina Hillemann (cox) | 6:31.03 | Italy; Serena Lo Bue; Lucrezia Fossi; Ilaria Broggini; Veronica Calabrese; Sara Barderi; Silvia Terrazzi; Claudia Destefani; Sandra Celoni; Camilla Contini (cox) | 6:32.59 |

== See also ==
- 2013 World Rowing Championships
- 2013 World Rowing U23 Championships
