= Lithuania at the Youth Olympics =

Performance of Lithuania at the Youth Olympic Games

- IOC code: LTU
- NOC: Lithuanian National Olympic Committee
- Website: www.ltok.lt (in Lithuanian)
- Medals Ranked 36th: Gold 7 Silver 3 Bronze 4 Total 14

Summer appearances
- 2010; 2014; 2018

Winter appearances
- 2012; 2016; 2020; 2024

Lithuania has participated at the Youth Olympic Games in every edition since the inaugural 2010 Games and has earned gold medals from every Summer edition.

== Medal tables ==
=== Medals by Summer Games ===
| Games | Athletes | Gold | Silver | Bronze | Total | Rank |
|---|---|---|---|---|---|---|
| 2010 Singapore | 24 | 3 | 0 | 1 | 4 | 19 |
| (China) 2014 Nanjing | 21 | 3 | 2 | 2 | 7 | 19 |
| (Argentina) 2018 Buenos Aires | 15 | 1 | 1 | 1 | 3 | 52 |
| (Senegal) 2026 Dakar | | | | | | |
| Total | | 7 | 3 | 4 | 14 | 24 |

=== Medals by Winter Games ===
| Games | Athletes | Gold | Silver | Bronze | Total | Rank |
|---|---|---|---|---|---|---|
| (Austria) 2012 Innsbruck | 6 | 0 | 0 | 0 | 0 | - |
| (Norway) 2016 Lillehammer | 10 | 0 | 0 | 0 | 0 | - |
| (Switzerland) 2020 Lausanne | 15 | 0 | 0 | 0 | 0 | - |
| (South Korea) 2024 Gangwon | | | | | | |
| Total | | 0 | 0 | 0 | 0 | - |

=== Medals by summer sport ===
| Sport | Gold | Silver | Bronze | Total |
|---|---|---|---|---|
| Swimming | 3 | 2 | 1 | 6 |
| Boxing | 2 | 0 | 0 | 2 |
| Basketball | 1 | 0 | 0 | 1 |
| Rowing | 1 | 0 | 0 | 1 |
| Canoeing | 0 | 1 | 0 | 1 |
| Judo | 0 | 0 | 1 | 1 |
| Modern pentathlon | 0 | 0 | 1 | 1 |
| Tennis | 0 | 0 | 1 | 1 |
| Totals (8 entries) | 7 | 3 | 4 | 14 |

=== Medals by winter sport ===
| Sport | Gold | Silver | Bronze | Total |
| Totals (0 entries) | 0 | 0 | 0 | 0 |

== List of medalists ==
=== Summer Games ===
| Medal | Name | Games | Sport | Event |
|---|---|---|---|---|
| Gold | Rolandas Maščinskas | 2010 Singapore | Rowing | Boys' single sculls |
| Gold | Evaldas Petrauskas | 2010 Singapore | Boxing | Boys' −60 kg |
| Gold | Ričardas Kuncaitis | 2010 Singapore | Boxing | Boys' −64 kg |
| Bronze | Laura Naginskaitė | 2010 Singapore | Judo | Girls' −63 kg |
| Gold | Rūta Meilutytė | (China) 2014 Nanjing | Swimming | Girls' 50 m breaststroke |
| Gold | Rūta Meilutytė | (China) 2014 Nanjing | Swimming | Girls' 100 m breaststroke |
| Gold | Justas Vazalis; Kristupas Žemaitis; Jonas Lekšas; Martynas Sajus | (China) 2014 Nanjing | Basketball | Boys' |
| Silver | Povilas Strazdas | (China) 2014 Nanjing | Swimming | Boys' 200 m medley |
| Silver | Vadim Korobov | (China) 2014 Nanjing | Canoeing | Boys' C1 sprint |
| Bronze | Akvilė Paražinskaitė | (China) 2014 Nanjing | Tennis | Girls' singles |
| Bronze | Dovidas Vaivada | (China) 2014 Nanjing | Modern pentathlon | Boys' individual |
| Gold | Agnė Šeleikaitė | (Argentina) 2018 Buenos Aires | Swimming | Girls' 50 m breaststroke |
| Silver | Kotryna Teterevkova | (Argentina) 2018 Buenos Aires | Swimming | Girls' 200 m breaststroke |
| Bronze | Kotryna Teterevkova | (Argentina) 2018 Buenos Aires | Swimming | Girls' 100 m breaststroke |

=== Summer Games medalists as part of Mixed-NOCs Team ===
| Medal | Name | Games | Sport | Event |
|---|---|---|---|---|
| Bronze | Lukas Kontrimavičius | 2010 Singapore | Modern pentathlon | Mixed relay |
| Bronze | Akvilė Paražinskaitė | (China) 2014 Nanjing | Tennis | Girls' doubles |

=== Winter Games medalists as part of Mixed-NOCs Team ===
| Medal | Name | Games | Sport | Event |
|---|---|---|---|---|
| Bronze | Artur Seniut | (Switzerland) 2020 Lausanne | Ice hockey | Boys' 3x3 mixed tournament |

== Flag bearers ==
| # | Games | Season | Flag bearer | Sport |
|---|---|---|---|---|
| 6 | 2020 Lausanne | Winter | Smiltė Bieliūnaitė | Alpine skiing |
| 5 | 2018 Buenos Aires | Summer | Dominykas Čepys | Athletics |
| 4 | 2016 Lillehammer | Winter | Deividas Kizala | Figure skating |
| 3 | 2014 Nanjing | Summer | | |
| 2 | 2012 Innsbruck | Winter | Rokas Zaveckas | Alpine skiing |
| 1 | 2010 Singapore | Summer | Mantas Jusis | Athletics |

== See also ==
- Lithuania at the Olympics
- Lithuania at the Paralympics
