= Tim Ole Naske =

German rower

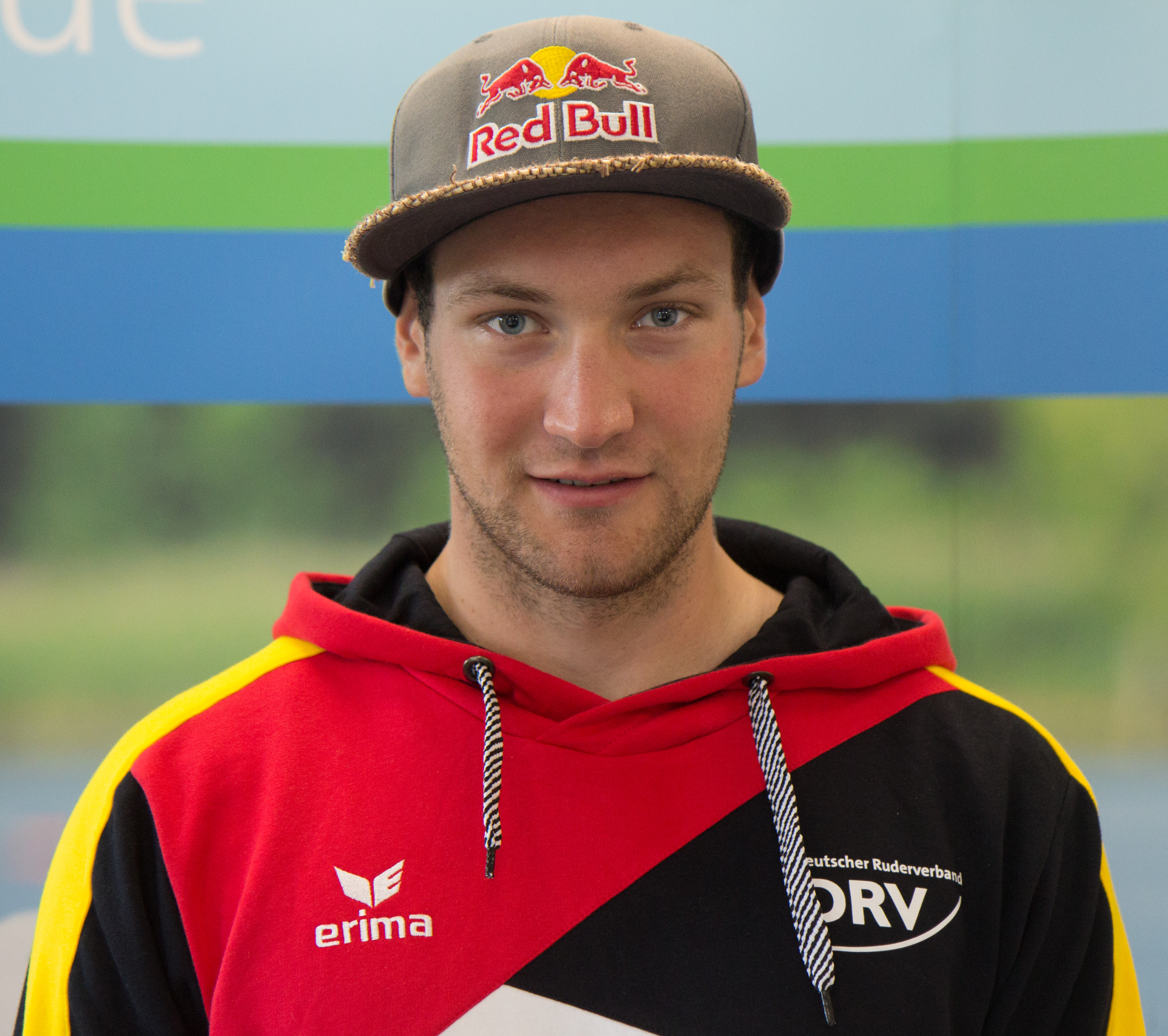
- Naske in 2017

Personal information
- Nationality: Germany
- Born: 26 April 1996 (age 30) Hamburg, Germany
- Height: 1.83 m (6 ft 0 in)

Sport
- Sport: Rowing
Medal record
Men's rowing
Representing Germany
Summer Youth Olympics
Gold medal – first place	2014 Nanjing	Single sculls
World U23 Championships
Gold medal – first place	2015 Plovdiv	Double sculls
Gold medal – first place	2016 Rotterdam	Single sculls
World Junior Championships
Gold medal – first place	2013 Trakai	Double sculls
Gold medal – first place	2014 Hamburg	Single sculls

Tim Ole Naske (born 26 April 1996) is a German rower. He competed in the 2020 Tokyo Olympics and 2024 Paris Olympics in the mens quadruple sculls, placing 8th and 5th respectively.
