= Rowing at the 2014 Summer Youth Olympics =

Rowing at the II Summer Youth Olympic Games
- Venue: Nanjing Rowing-Canoeing School
- Dates: 17–20 August

Rowing at the 2014 Summer Youth Olympics was held from 17 to 20 August at the Nanjing Rowing-Canoeing School in Nanjing, China.

== Qualification ==
Four qualification events were held to determine the representation for the 2014 Youth Olympics, the 2013 World Junior Championships and three continental qualifiers. Each National Olympic Committee (NOC) can enter a maximum of 2 boats, 1 per each gender. Should China not qualify any boats they would be given a boat in single sculls for each gender. The host quota was not used as they qualified from the Asian regatta. In addition six athlete quotas, three from each gender will be decided by the Tripartite Commission. Only four spots, two from each gender were decided by the Tripartite Commission. The other two spots were reallocated based on the performances from the 2013 World Junior Championships.

To be eligible to participate at the Youth Olympics athletes must have been born between 1 January 1996 and 31 December 1997. Should a NOC qualify two boats from the same gender the boat with the higher ranking will be qualified and the next highest ranked NOC will qualify.

=== Summary ===
Nation	Men		Women		Crews	Athletes
Nation	M1x	M2-	W1x	W2-	Crews	Athletes
Algeria	X		X		2	2
Argentina	X		X		2	2
Australia	X			X	2	3
Austria		X			1	2
Azerbaijan	X				1	1
Belarus			X		1	1
Belgium	X				1	1
Brazil	X		X		2	2
Bulgaria			X		1	1
Canada	X			X	2	3
Chile		X		X	2	4
China				X	1	2
Croatia		X	X		2	3
Cuba	X		X		2	2
Czech Republic		X	X		2	3
Denmark			X		1	1
El Salvador	X				1	1
Egypt		X		X	2	4
France	X		X		2	2
Germany	X			X	2	3
Great Britain	X		X		2	2
Greece		X	X		2	3
India		X			1	2
Indonesia	X				1	1
Ireland			X		1	1
Italy		X	X		2	3
Japan			X		1	1
Lithuania	X		X		2	2
New Zealand	X			X	2	3
North Korea	X				1	1
Norway	X		X		2	2
Paraguay			X		1	1
Peru	X				1	1
Poland	X			X	2	3
Romania		X		X	2	4
Serbia	X				1	1
Slovenia		X			1	2
Spain				X	1	2
Sri Lanka	X				1	1
Togo			X		1	1
Tunisia	X		X		2	2
Turkey		X			1	2
Uganda			X		1	1
Ukraine				X	1	2
United States		X		X	2	4
Uzbekistan	X		X		2	2
Vietnam			X		1	1
Zimbabwe	X		X		2	2
Total: 48 NOCs	24	12	24	12	72	96

=== Single Sculls ===
Event	Location	Date	Total Places	Qualified Boys	Qualified Girls
Host Nation	-	-	0	~~China~~	~~China~~
2013 World Championships	(Lithuania) Trakai	7–11 August 2013	11	Australia; Azerbaijan; Cuba; France; Germany; Great Britain; Lithuania; New Zealand; Norway; Poland; Serbia	Belarus; Brazil; Bulgaria; Denmark; France; Great Britain; Greece; Ireland; Italy; Lithuania; Norway
Africa Qualification Regatta	(Tunisia) Tunis	9–10 October 2013	3	Algeria; Tunisia; Zimbabwe	Algeria; Tunisia; Zimbabwe
Asian Qualification Regatta	(Uzbekistan) Samarkand	13–17 October 2013	3	Indonesia; North Korea; Uzbekistan	Japan; Uzbekistan; Vietnam
Latin American Qualification Regatta	(Uruguay) Montevideo	15–18 April 2014	3	Argentina; Brazil; Peru	Argentina; Cuba; Paraguay
Tripartite Invitation	-	-	2	El Salvador; Sri Lanka	Togo; Uganda
Reallocation of Unused Quotas	-	-	2	Belgium; Canada	Croatia; Czech Republic
TOTAL				24	24

=== Pairs ===
Event	Location	Date	Total Places	Qualified Boys	Qualified Girls
2013 World Championships	(Lithuania) Trakai	7–11 August 2013	9	Austria; Croatia; Czech Republic; Greece; Italy; Romania; Slovenia; Turkey; United States	Australia; Canada; Germany; New Zealand; Poland; Romania; Spain; Ukraine; United States
Africa Qualification Regatta	(Tunisia) Tunis	9–10 October 2013	1	Egypt	Egypt
Asian Qualification Regatta	(Uzbekistan) Samarkand	13–17 October 2013	1	India	China
Latin American Qualification Regatta	(Uruguay) Montevideo	15–18 April 2014	1	Chile	Chile
TOTAL				12	12

== Schedule ==
The schedule was released by the Nanjing Youth Olympic Games Organizing Committee.

All times are CST (UTC+8)

Event date	Event day	Starting time	Event details
August 17	Sunday	10:00	Girls' Single Sculls Heats; Boys' Single Sculls Heats; Girls' Pairs Heats; Boys' Pairs Heats
August 18	Monday	10:00	Girls' Single Sculls Repechage; Boys' Single Sculls Repechage; Girls' Pairs Heats; Boys' Pairs Heats
August 19	Tuesday	10:00	Girls' Single Sculls Semifinals; Boys' Single Sculls Semifinals; Girls' Pairs Repechage; Boys' Pairs Repechage
August 20	Wednesday	10:00	Girls' Single Sculls Finals; Boys' Single Sculls Finals; Girls' Pairs Finals; Boys' Pairs Finals

== Medal summary ==
=== Medal table ===
* Host nation (China)

Rank	Nation	Gold	Silver	Bronze	Total
1	Romania	2	0	0	2
2	Belarus	1	0	0	1
2	Germany	1	0	0	1
4	Azerbaijan	0	1	0	1
4	China*	0	1	0	1
4	Czech Republic	0	1	0	1
4	Greece	0	1	0	1
8	Canada	0	0	2	2
9	France	0	0	1	1
9	Turkey	0	0	1	1
Totals (10 entries)		4	4	4	12

=== Boys ===
Event	Gold	Silver	Bronze
Boys' Single Sculls	Tim Ole Naske; Germany	Boris Yotov; Azerbaijan	Dan de Groot; Canada
Boys' Pairs	Romania; Gheorghe Robert Dedu; Ciprian Tudosă	Czech Republic; Miroslav Jech; Lukáš Helešic	Turkey; Gökhan Güven; Eren Can Aslan

=== Girls ===
Event	Gold	Silver	Bronze
Girls' Single Sculls	Krystsina Staraselets; Belarus	Athina Angelopoulou; Greece	Camille Juillet; France
Girls' Pairs	Romania; Cristina Georgiana Popescu; Denisa Tîlvescu	China; Luo Yadan; Pan Jie	Canada; Larissa Werbicki; Caileigh Filmer

== Final results ==
=== Male - Single Sculls ===
Pos	Race	Lane	Name	Nat	Time
1	A-1	3	Tim Ole Naske	Germany	3m 21s 22ms
2	A-2	5	Boris Yotov	Azerbaijan	3m 21s 82ms
3	A-3	4	Dan De Groot	Canada	3m 22s 21ms
4	A-4	2	Chris Lawrie	Great Britain	3m 23s 89ms
5	A-5	1	Mateusz Swietek	Poland	3m 28s 31ms
6	A-6	6	Orlando Sotolongo	Cuba	3m 32s 14ms
7	B-1	3	Uncas Tales Batista	Brazil	3m 27s 44ms
8	B-2	2	Thomas Schramko	Australia	3m 32s 04ms
9	B-3	4	Jack O'Leary	New Zealand	3m 32s 29ms
10	B-4	6	Andrius Lapatiukas	Lithuania	3m 35s 88ms
11	B-5	5	Niels Van Zandweghe	Belgium	3m 36s 45ms
12	B-6	1	Joel Rabel	Argentina	3m 40s 58ms
13	C-1	2	Maxime Ducret	France	3m 29s 73ms
14	C-2	3	Mohamed Taieb	Tunisia	3m 30s 25ms
15	C-3	4	Zoran Rajic	Serbia	3m 32s 06ms
16	C-4	5	Shakhboz Abdujabborov	Uzbekistan	3m 32s 81ms
17	C-5	6	Ask Jarl Tjom	Norway	3m 36s 96ms
18	C-6	1	Gonzalo Del Solar	Peru	3m 38s 00ms
19	D-1	4	Denri Maulidzar Al Ghiffari	Indonesia	3m 41s 28ms
20	D-2	3	Kyle Hinde	Zimbabwe	3m 44s 22ms
21	D-3	5	Boucif Mohammed Belhadj	Algeria	3m 47s 99ms
22	D-4	1	Vishan Mario Gunatilleka	Sri Lanka	3m 49s 53ms
23	D-5	2	Juan Carlos Elias	El Salvador	3m 50s 31ms
24	D-6	5	Ryonghyok Choe	North Korea	DNS

=== Female - Single Sculls ===
Pos	Race	Lane	Name	Nat	Time
1	1	3	Krystsina Staraselets	Belarus	3m 51s 33ms
2	2	4	Athina Maria Angelopoulou	Greece	3m 51s 59ms
3	3	2	Camille Juillet	France	3m 53s 80ms
4	4	6	Sonata Petrikaite	Lithuania	3m 54s 06ms
5	5	5	Desislava Georgieva	Bulgaria	3m 59s 62ms
6	6	1	Alejandra Alonso	Paraguay	4m 02s 91ms
7	B-1	5	Thea Helseth	Norway	3m 59s 28ms
8	B-2	3	Anna Thornton	Great Britain	4m 01s 21ms
9	B-3	6	Daniella Du Toit	Zimbabwe	4m 01s 83ms
10	B-4	4	Anna Zabova	Czech Republic	4m 03s 69ms
11	B-5	1	Eimear Lambe	Ireland	4m 03s 82ms
12	B-6	2	Marina Kaic	Croatia	4m 05s 06ms
13	C-1	3	Ilianny Roman Olivera	Cuba	4m 01s 70ms
14	C-2	5	Astrid Steensberg	Denmark	4m 02s 03ms
15	C-3	2	Nour El Houda Ettaieb	Tunisia	4m 02s 21ms
16	C-4	4	Arianna Mazzoni	Italy	4m 03s 30ms
17	C-5	1	Sophia Valente Camara Py	Brazil	4m 08s 27ms
18	C-6	6	Ilen Carballo	Argentina	4m 15s 15ms
19	D-1	4	Miharu Takashima	Japan	4m 07s 20ms
20	D-2	3	Hao Cao Thi	Vietnam	4m 07s 46ms
21	D-3	2	Yulduz Kulgovaya	Uzbekistan	4m 13s 07ms
22	D-4	5	Thiziri Douki	Algeria	4m 32s 59ms
23	D-5	1	Akossiwa Ayivon	Togo	4m 39s 45ms
24	D-6	6	Constance Mbambu	Uganda	4m 56s 12ms

=== Male - Pair ===
Pos	Race	Lane	Name	Nat	Time
1	A-1	3	Gheorghe Robert Dedu (bow); Ciprian Tudosa (s)	Romania	3m 11s 27ms
2	A-2	4	Miroslav Jech (bow); Lukas Helesic (s)	Czech Republic	3m 12s 13ms
3	A-3	2	Gökhan Güven (bow); Eren Can Aslan (s)	Turkey	3m 12s 21ms
4	A-4	5	Vid Pugelj (bow); Ziga Zaric (s)	Slovenia	3m 12s 30ms
5	A-5	6	Bernard Samardzic (bow); Ivo Bonacin (s)	Croatia	3m 14s 76ms
6	A-6	1	Christoph Seifriedsberger (bow); Ferdinand Querfeld (s)	Austria	3m 15s 73ms
7	B-1	3	Nikolaos Kakouris (bow); Thomas Karamitros (s)	Greece	3m 18s 90ms
8	B-2	4	Liam Corrigan (bow); Benj Cohen (s)	United States	3m 19s 43ms
9	B-3	5	Riccardo Mager (bow); Riccardo Peretti (s)	Italy	3m 21s 87ms
10	B-4	2	Sebastian Romo Figueroa (bow); Cesar Abaroa (s)	Chile	3m 23s 44ms
11	B-5	6	Hussein Aly (bow); Hossam Mohamed (s)	Egypt	3m 26s 09ms
12	B-6	1	Amit Kumar (bow); Atul Kumar (s)	India	3m 26s 56ms

=== Female - Pair ===
Pos	Race	Lane	Name	Nat	Time
1	A-1	3	Cristina Georgiana Popescu (bow); Denisa Tilvescu (s)	Romania	3m 37s 32ms
2	A-2	5	Yadan Luo (bow); Jie Pan (s)	China	3m 37s 52ms
3	A-3	4	Larissa Werbicki (bow); Caileigh Filmer (s)	Canada	3m 37s 75ms
4	A-4	1	Dana Moffat (bow); Marlee Blue (s)	United States	3m 39s 25ms
5	A-5	2	Antonia Abraham (bow); Melita Abraham (s)	Chile	3m 39s 89ms
6	A-6	6	Karolina Smyrak (bow); Katarzyna Pilch (s)	Poland	3m 46s 10ms
7	B-1	4	Alla Sarkanych (bow); Daria Halahan (s)	Ukraine	3m 47s 15ms
8	B-2	3	Bea Bliemel (bow); Carlotta Schmitz (s)	Germany	3m 48s 26ms
9	B-3	5	Renee Olley (bow); Jackie Gowler (s)	New Zealand	3m 53s 19ms
10	B-4	1	Tyler Ferris (bow); Miller Ferris (s)	Australia	3m 55s 80ms
11	B-5	2	Valeria Palma Vallejo (bow); Rocio Lao Sanchez (s)	Spain	4m 04s 01ms
12	B-6	6	Alaa Mohamed (bow); Basma Mahmoud (s)	Egypt	4m 24s 38ms
