= Yemen at the 2018 Summer Youth Olympics =

- IOC code: YEM
- NOC: Yemen Olympic Committee
- Website: www.nocyemen.org (in Arabic and English)

in Buenos Aires, Argentina 6 – 18 October 2018
- Competitors: 3 in 2 sports
- Medals: Gold 0 Silver 0 Bronze 0 Total 0

Summer Youth Olympics appearances
- 2010; 2014; 2018

Yemen participated at the 2018 Summer Youth Olympics in Buenos Aires, Argentina from 6 October to 18 October 2018.

== Judo ==
Individual

Athlete	Event	Round of 16	Quarterfinals	Semifinals	Rep 1	Rep 2	Rep 3	Final / BM	Rank
Athlete	Event	Opposition Result	Opposition Result	Opposition Result	Opposition Result	Opposition Result	Opposition Result	Opposition Result	Rank
Ahad Al-Sagheer	Boys' 66 kg	Vugar Talibov (AZE); L 00–10	did not advance		João Santos (BRA); L 00–10	did not advance			

Team

Athletes	Event	Round of 16	Quarterfinals	Semifinals	Final	Rank
Athletes	Event	Opposition Result	Opposition Result	Opposition Result	Opposition Result	Rank
Team Singapore; Ahad Al-Sagheer (YEM); Anastasia Balaban (UKR); Bryan Garboa (ECU); Sarah Kafufula (COD); Mariem Khlifi (TUN); Ahmed Mohamed Fahmy (EGY); Eduarda Rosa (BRA); Ilia Sulamanidze (GEO)	Mixed Team	Team Moscow (MIX); L 3–4	did not advance			
