= Constantin Radu (rower) =

Romanian rower

Personal information
- Nationality: Romanian
- Born: 26 April 1996 (age 30) Suceava, Romania

Sport
- Sport: Rowing
Medal record
Men's rowing
Representing Romania
World Junior Championships
Silver medal – second place	2014 Hamburg	Coxless four

Constantin Radu (born 26 April 1996) is a Romanian rower. He competed in the men's eight event at the 2020 Summer Olympics.
