= Larissa Werbicki =

Canadian rower (born 1996)

Personal information
- Born: 28 June 1996 (age 30) Saskatoon, Saskatchewan, Canada

Sport
- Country: Canada
Medal record
Women's rowing
Representing Canada
Summer Youth Olympics
Bronze medal – third place	2014 Nanjing	Coxless pair
World Junior Championships
Silver medal – second place	2014 Hamburg	Coxless pair
Pan American Games
Silver medal – second place	2019 Lima	Coxless pair

Larissa Werbicki (born 28 June 1996) is a Canadian rower.

== Career ==
Werbicki won a bronze medal at the 2014 Summer Youth Olympics in the coxless pairs event alongside Caileigh Filmer and a silver medal at the 2014 World Rowing Junior Championships in the pairs event alongside Filmer.

She competed at the 2019 Pan American Games where she won a silver medal in the coxless pair event alongside Jessie Loutit.

In 2020, Werbicki was selected to be part of the Team Canada class of 2020–2022 at the Smith School of Business.
