= Jessie Loutit =

Canadian rower

Personal information
- Born: 3 November 1988 (age 37)

Sport
- Country: Canada
Medal record
Pan American Games
Silver medal – second place	2019 Lima	Coxless pairs

Jessie Loutit (born 3 November 1988) is a Canadian rower.

Loutit competed at the 2019 Pan American Games where she won a silver medal in the coxless pairs event alongside Larissa Werbicki.
