= Atichai Phoemsap =

Thai boxer

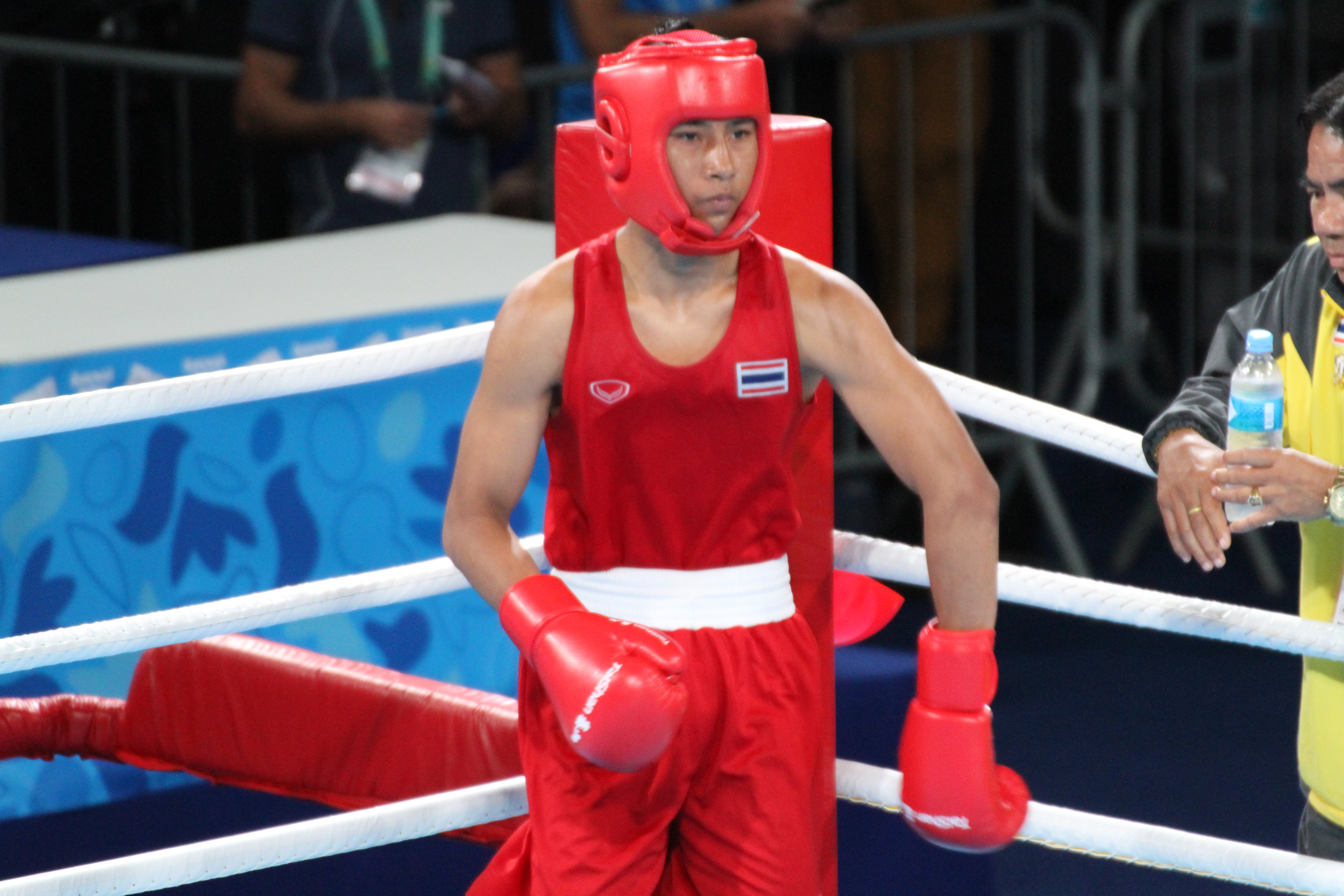
- Phoemsap at the 2018 Youth Olympics

Personal information
- Full name: อธิชัย เพิ่มทรัพย์
- Nationality: Thailand
- Born: 2000 (age 25–26) Nakhon Ratchasima, Thailand

Sport
- Sport: Boxing
- Weight class: Lightweight
Medal record
Youth Olympic Games
Gold medal – first place	2018 Buenos Aires	Lightweight
World Youth Amateur Championships
Gold medal – first place	2018 Bucharest	Lightweight

Atichai Phoemsap is a Thai amateur boxer. As an amateur, he won the 2018 Summer Youth Olympics and 2018 AIBA Youth World Boxing Championships.

== Amateur career ==
Phoemsap represented Thailand in the AIBA Youth World Boxing Championships and defeated Hungarian boxer Adrián Orbán to win the gold medal. Moreover, he competed in the 2018 Youth Olympics and defeated Ukrainian boxer Taras Bonarchuk in the final and won the gold medal.
