= Wrestling at the 2018 Summer Youth Olympics – Girls' freestyle 43 kg =

Girls' freestyle 43kg at the III Summer Youth Olympic Games
- Venue: Asia Pavilion
- Date: 13 October 2018
- Competitors: 10 from 10 nations

Medalists
| 1st place, gold medalist(s) | | Emily Shilson | United States |
| 2nd place, silver medalist(s) | | Simran Kaur | India |
| 3rd place, bronze medalist(s) | | Shahana Nazarova | Azerbaijan |

The girls' freestyle 43 kg competition at the 2018 Summer Youth Olympics was held on 13 October, at the Asia Pavilion.

== Competition format ==
As there were ten wrestlers in a weight category, the pool phase will be run as a single group competing in a round-robin format. Ranking within the groups is used to determine the pairings for the final phase.

== Schedule ==
All times are in local time (UTC-3).

| Date | Time | Round |
|---|---|---|
| Saturday, 13 October 2018 | 10:00; 10:50; 11:40; 12:30; 13:20; 17:00 | Round 1 Round 2 Round 3 Round 4 Round 5 Finals |

== Results ==
Legend

- F — Won by fall
- WO — Won by Walkover

Group Stages

| Qualified for the Gold-medal match |
| Qualified for the Bronze-medal match |
| Qualified for the 5th/6th Place Match |
| Qualified for the 7th/8th Place Match |
| Qualified for the 9th/10th Place Match |

Group A

| Pos | Athlete | Pld | W | L | CP | TP | Qualification |
|---|---|---|---|---|---|---|---|
| 1 | Simran Kaur (IND) | 4 | 4 | 0 | 17 | 24 | Gold-medal match |
| 2 | Enkhzul Batbaatar (MGL) | 4 | 3 | 1 | 15 | 13 | Bronze-medal match |
| 3 | Maria Leorda (MDA) | 4 | 2 | 2 | 8 | 8 | Classification 5th/6th place match |
| 4 | Sara Gouda (EGY) | 4 | 1 | 3 | 7 | 7 | Classification 7th/8th place match |
| 5 | Ella Derry (NZL) | 4 | 0 | 4 | 0 | 0 | Classification 9th/10th place match |

Source: UWW

| | Score | | CP |
|---|---|---|---|
| Ella Derry (NZL) | WO | Maria Leorda (MDA) | 0–5 VIN |
| Enkhzul Batbaatar (MGL) | 2–4 Fall | Sara Gouda (EGY) | 5–0 VFA |
| Simran Kaur (IND) | WO | Ella Derry (NZL) | 5–0 VIN |
| Maria Leorda (MDA) | 0–10 | Enkhzul Batbaatar (MGL) | 0–4 VSU |
| Sara Gouda (EGY) | WO | Ella Derry (NZL) | 5–0 VIN |
| Simran Kaur (IND) | 8–0 Fall | Maria Leorda (MDA) | 5–0 VFA |
| Enkhzul Batbaatar (MGL) | WO | Ella Derry (NZL) | 5–0 VIN |
| Sara Gouda (EGY) | 2–14 | Simran Kaur (IND) | 1–4 VSU1 |
| Maria Leorda (MDA) | 8–1 | Sara Gouda (EGY) | 3–1 VPO1 |
| Enkhzul Batbaatar (MGL) | 1–2 | Simran Kaur (IND) | 1–3 VPO1 |

Group B

| Pos | Athlete | Pld | W | L | CP | TP | Qualification |
|---|---|---|---|---|---|---|---|
| 1 | Emily Shilson (USA) | 4 | 4 | 0 | 16 | 29 | Gold-medal match |
| 2 | Shahana Nazarova (AZE) | 4 | 3 | 1 | 14 | 20 | Bronze-medal match |
| 3 | Justine Vigouroux (FRA) | 4 | 2 | 2 | 8 | 12 | Classification 5th/6th place match |
| 4 | Heloísa Martinez (BRA) | 4 | 1 | 3 | 5 | 8 | Classification 7th/8th place match |
| 5 | Christianah Ogunsanya (NGR) | 4 | 0 | 4 | 0 | 9 | Classification 9th/10th place match |

Source: UWW

| | Score | | CP |
|---|---|---|---|
| Heloísa Martinez (BRA) | 6–9 Fall | Christianah Ogunsanya (NGR) | 5–0 VFA |
| Justine Vigouroux (FRA) | 0–5 | Emily Shilson (USA) | 0–3 VPO |
| Shahana Nazarova (AZE) | 11–0 Fall | Heloísa Martinez (BRA) | 5–0 VFA |
| Christianah Ogunsanya (NGR) | 0–1 | Justine Vigouroux (FRA) | 0–3 VPO |
| Emily Shilson (USA) | 10–0 | Heloísa Martinez (BRA) | 4–0 VSU |
| Shahana Nazarova (AZE) | 6–0 Fall | Christianah Ogunsanya (NGR) | 5–0 VFA |
| Justine Vigouroux (FRA) | 11–2 Fall | Heloísa Martinez (BRA) | 5–0 VFA |
| Emily Shilson (USA) | 12–2 | Shahana Nazarova (AZE) | 4–1 VSU1 |
| Christianah Ogunsanya (NGR) | 0–2 Fall | Emily Shilson (USA) | 0–5 VFA |
| Justine Vigouroux (FRA) | 0–1 | Shahana Nazarova (AZE) | 0–3 VPO |

=== Finals ===
| Gold-medal match |
| Simran Kaur (IND) | 6 |
| Emily Shilson (USA) | 11 |

| Bronze-medal match |
| Enkhzul Batbaatar (MGL) | 6 |
| Shahana Nazarova (AZE) | 7 |

| Classification 5th/6th place match |
| Maria Leorda (MDA) | 0 |
| Justine Vigouroux (FRA) | 4 |

| Classification 7th/8th place match |
| Sara Gouda (EGY) | 10 |
| Heloísa Martinez (BRA) | 0 |

| Classification 9th/10th place match |
| Ella Derry (NZL) |
| Christianah Ogunsanya (NGR) | WO |

== Final rankings ==
| Rank | Athlete |
|---|---|
| 1st place, gold medalist(s) | Emily Shilson (USA) |
| 2nd place, silver medalist(s) | Simran Kaur (IND) |
| 3rd place, bronze medalist(s) | Shahana Nazarova (AZE) |
| 4 | Enkhzul Batbaatar (MGL) |
| 5 | Justine Vigouroux (FRA) |
| 6 | Maria Leorda (MDA) |
| 7 | Sara Gouda (EGY) |
| 8 | Heloísa Martinez (BRA) |
| 9 | Christianah Ogunsanya (NGR) |
| 10 | Ella Derry (NZL) |
