= Boxing at the 2018 Summer Youth Olympics – Boys' lightweight =

Boxing competitions

Boys' lightweight boxing at the III Summer Youth Olympic Games
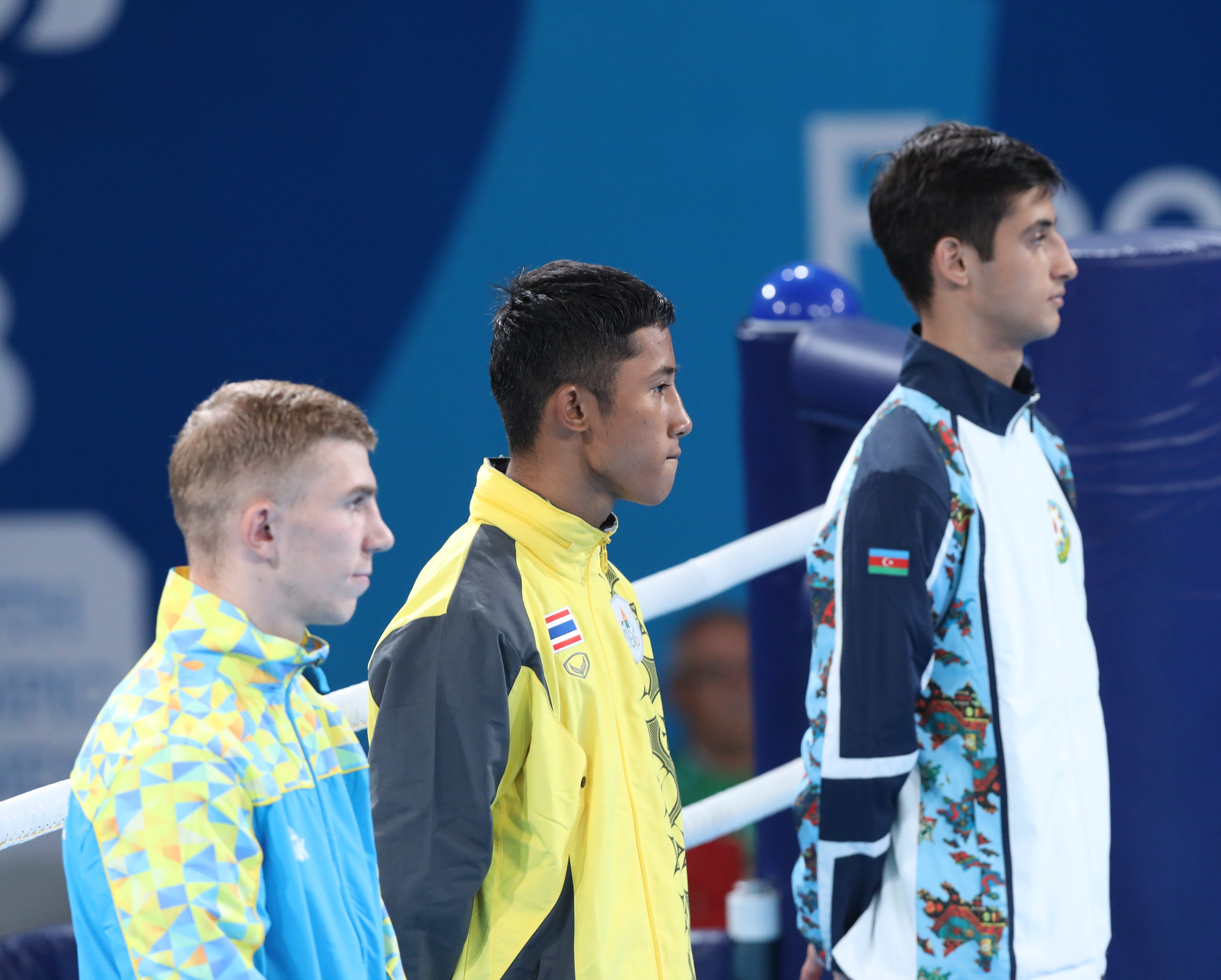
- Venue: Oceania Pavilion
- Date: 14–17 October
- Competitors: 6 from 6 nations

Medalists
1st place, gold medalist(s)		Atichai Phoemsap	Thailand
2nd place, silver medalist(s)		Taras Bondarchuk	Ukraine
3rd place, bronze medalist(s)		Nurlan Safarov	Azerbaijan

The boys' lightweight boxing competition at the 2018 Summer Youth Olympics in Buenos Aires was held from 14 to 17 October at the Oceania Pavilion.

== Schedule ==
All times are local (UTC−3).

Date	Time	Round
Sunday, 14 October	13:36	Preliminary Round 1
Monday, 15 October	13:14	Preliminary Round 2
Tuesday, 16 October	13:31	Semifinals
Wednesday, 17 October	17:59	Finals

== Results ==
Preliminary Round 1
Nurlan Safarov (AZE)	3
Spencer Wilcox (CAN)	2
Kasib Murdoch-McKeich (NZL)	0
Taras Bondarchuk (UKR)	5

Preliminary Round 2
Atichai Phoemsap (THA)	4
Spencer Wilcox (CAN)	1
Kasib Murdoch-McKeich (NZL)	0
Marwan Mamdouh (EGY)	5

Semifinals
Nurlan Safarov (AZE)	0
Atichai Phoemsap (THA)	5
Marwan Mamdouh (EGY)	0
Taras Bondarchuk (UKR)	5
Fifth place
Spencer Wilcox (CAN)	5
Kasib Murdoch-McKeich (NZL)	0

Final
Atichai Phoemsap (THA)	5
Taras Bondarchuk (UKR)	0
Third place
Nurlan Safarov (AZE)	4
Marwan Mamdouh (EGY)	0

== Final standings ==
Rank	Athlete
1st place, gold medalist(s)	Atichai Phoemsap (THA)
2nd place, silver medalist(s)	Taras Bondarchuk (UKR)
3rd place, bronze medalist(s)	Nurlan Safarov (AZE)
4	Marwan Mamdouh (EGY)
5	Spencer Wilcox (CAN)
6	Kasib Murdoch-McKeich (NZL)
