= Judo at the 2018 Summer Youth Olympics – Boys' 66 kg =

Judo competition

Boys' 66 kg at the III Summer Youth Olympic Games
- Venue: Asia Pavilion
- Date: 7 October
- Competitors: 17 from 17 nations

Medalists
1st place, gold medalist(s)		Vugar Talibov; Azerbaijan
2nd place, silver medalist(s)		Abrek Naguchev; Russia
3rd place, bronze medalist(s)		Antonio Tornal; Dominican Republic
3rd place, bronze medalist(s)		Javier Peña; Spain

The Boys' 66 kg competition at the 2018 Summer Youth Olympics was held on 7 October, at the Asia Pavilion.

== Schedule ==
All times are in local time (UTC-3).

Date	Time	Round
Sunday, 7 October 2018	10:00; 10:00; 11:00; 11:00; 12:00; 15:00	Round of 32; Round of 16; Quarterfinals; Repechage Rounds; Semifinals; Finals

== Results ==
Legend

- 1st number — Ippon
- 2nd number — Waza-ari
- s — Shido

=== Preliminary round ===
	Score	
João Santos (BRA)	00s2–01	Kimy Bravo (CUB)

=== Main Bracket ===
Round of 16
Abrek Naguchev (RUS)	10
Simon Zulu (ZAM)	00
Turpal Djoukaev (FIN)	10
Mohammed Al-Mishri (LBA)	00
Jaykhunbek Nazarov (UZB)	10
Georgios Balarjishvili (CYP)	00s1
Hamza Jashari (MKD)	01
Javier Peña (ESP)	11
Jamshed Sulaimoni (TJK)	10
Sultan Zhenishbekov (KGZ)	00
Ahad Al-Sagheer (YEM)	00
Vugar Talibov (AZE)	10
Antonio Tornal (DOM)	10s2
Kimy Bravo (CUB)	00s1
Loreince Nanekoula (GAB)	00s2
Jalen Kon Elijah (CMR)	10

Quarterfinals
Abrek Naguchev (RUS)	10
Turpal Djoukaev (FIN)	00s3
Jaykhunbek Nazarov (UZB)	00s2
Javier Peña (ESP)	10
Jamshed Sulaimoni (TJK)	00s2
Vugar Talibov (AZE)	01s1
Antonio Tornal (DOM)	10
Jalen Kon Elijah (CMR)	00

Semifinals
Abrek Naguchev (RUS)	10s1
Javier Peña (ESP)	00
Vugar Talibov (AZE)	01s2
Antonio Tornal (DOM)	00s1

Final
Abrek Naguchev (RUS)	00
Vugar Talibov (AZE)	10

=== Repechage ===
	Score	
João Santos (BRA)	10–00	Sultan Zhenishbekov (KGZ)

Repechage 1
Simon Zulu (ZAM)	10s1
Mohammed Al-Mishri (LBA)	00s1
Georgios Balarjishvili (CYP)	00s2
Hamza Jashari (MKD)	01
João Santos (BRA)	10
Ahad Al-Sagheer (YEM)	00
Kimy Bravo (CUB)	10
Loreince Nanekoula (GAB)	00s1

Repechage 2
Simon Zulu (ZAM)	00s3
Jaykhunbek Nazarov (UZB)	10s2
Hamza Jashari (MKD)	00s1
Turpal Djoukaev (FIN)	01
João Santos (BRA)	11
Jalen Kon Elijah (CMR)	00
Kimy Bravo (CUB)	01s2
Jamshed Sulaimoni (TJK)	00s2

Repechage 3
Jaykhunbek Nazarov (UZB)	10s1
Turpal Djoukaev (FIN)	00s3
João Santos (BRA)	00s2
Kimy Bravo (CUB)	01s2

Bronze Medal Finals
Jaykhunbek Nazarov (UZB)	00s3
Antonio Tornal (DOM)	10s1
Kimy Bravo (CUB)	01
Javier Peña (ESP)	11

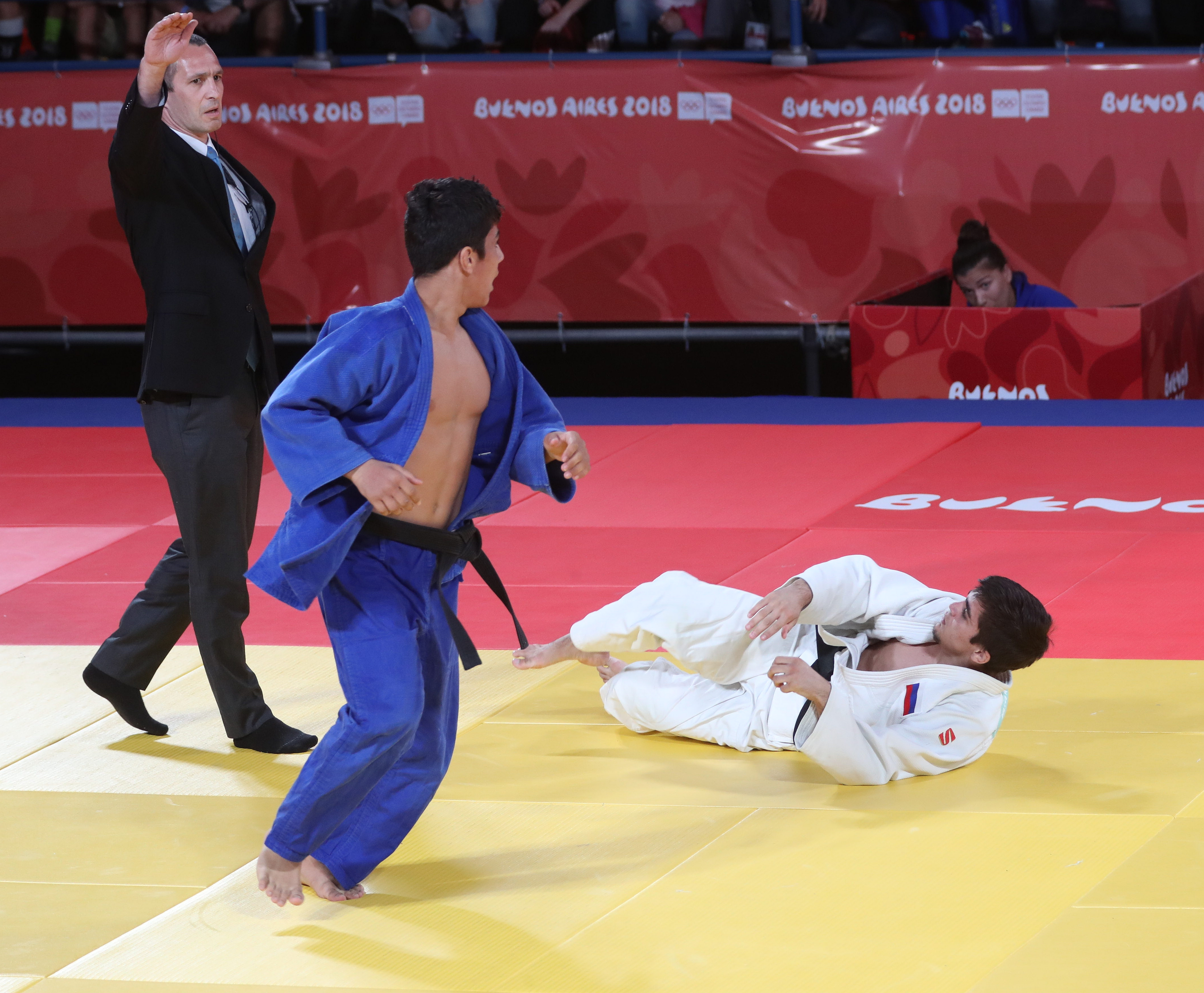
Final: Abrek Naguchev vs. Vugar Talibov (left, receiving the ippon score)

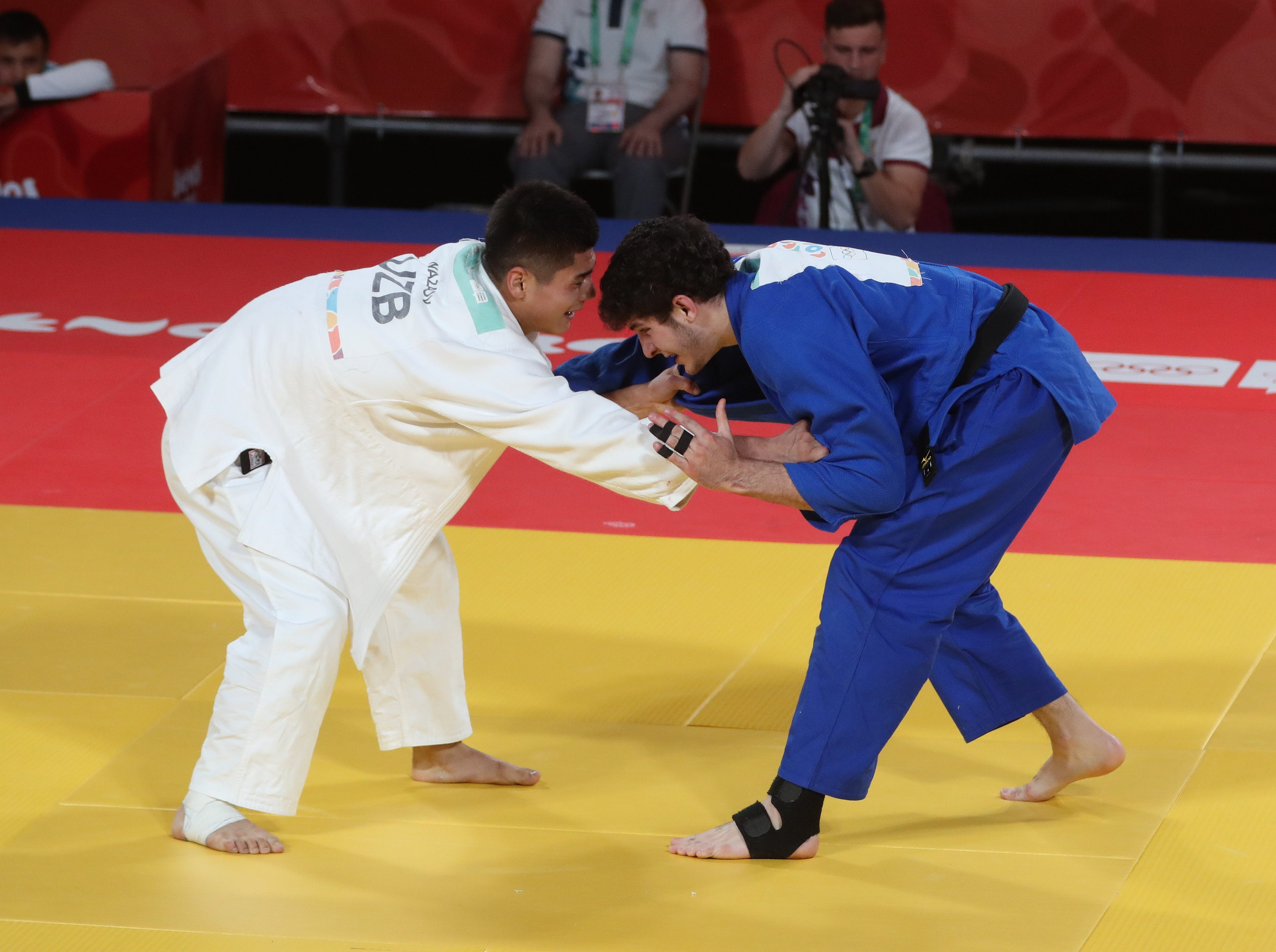
Bronze medal match: Jaykhunbek Nazarov vs. Antonio Tornal (right)

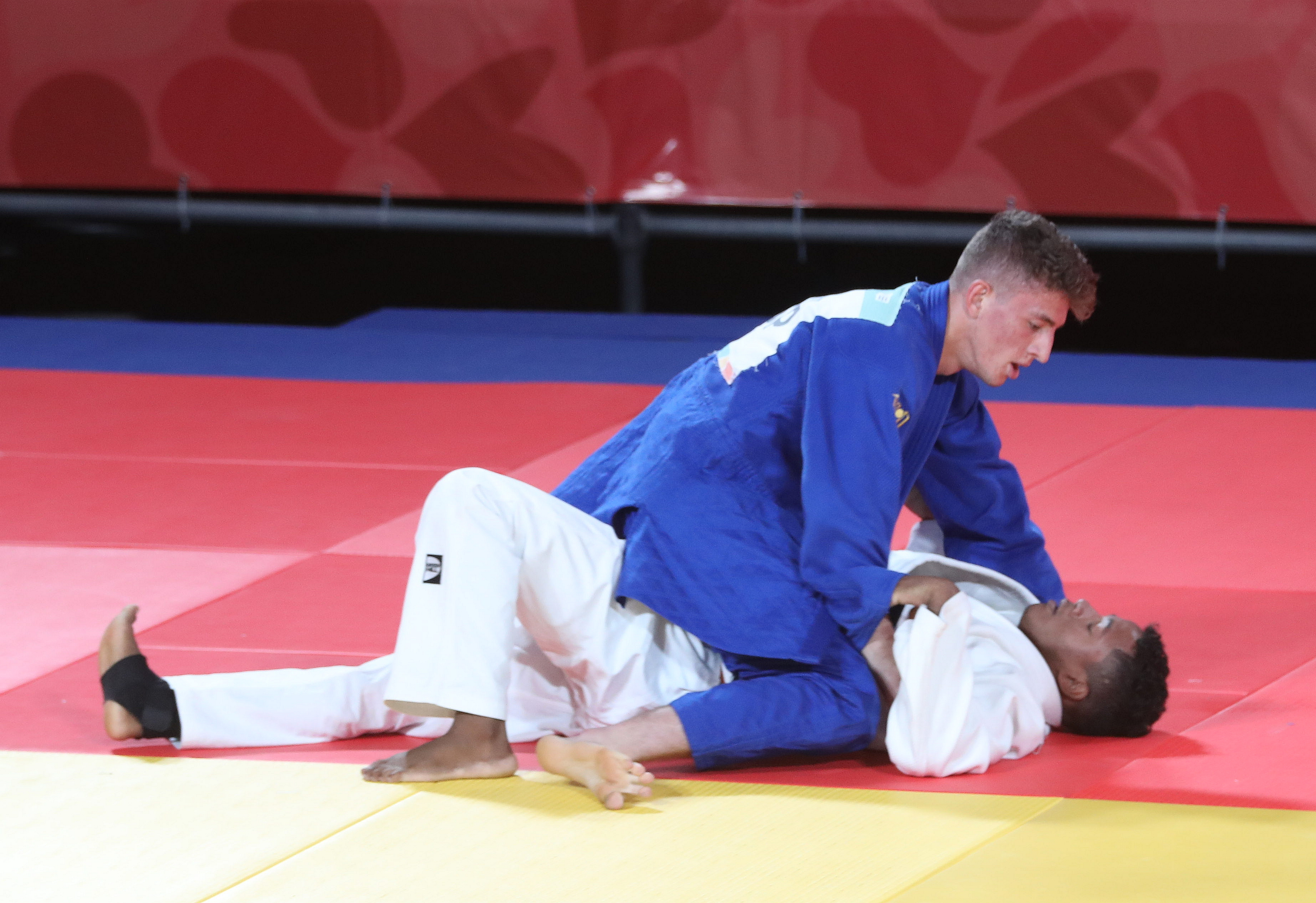
Bronze medal match: Kimy Bravo vs. Javier Peña (on top)

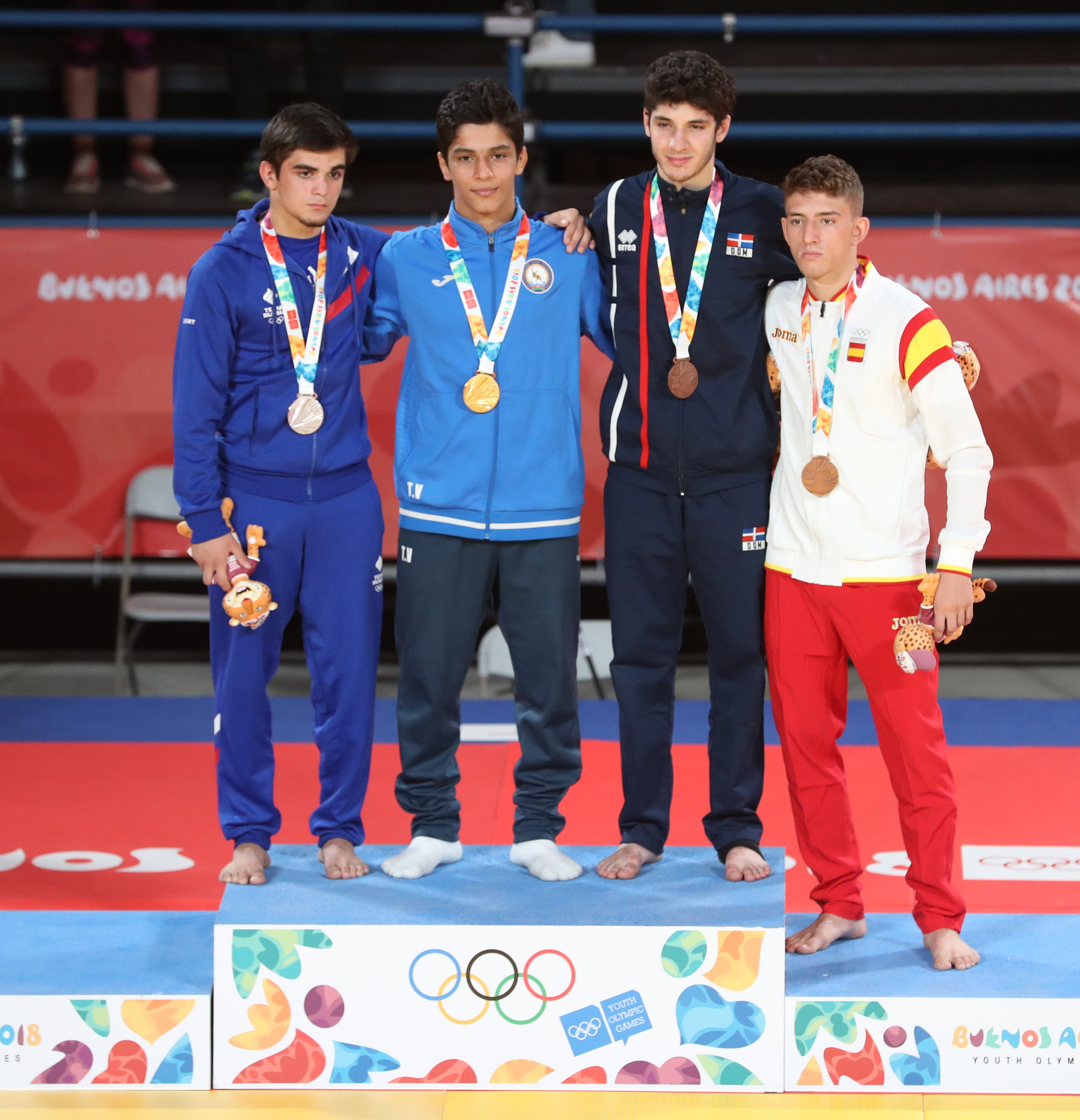
Victory ceremony
