= Boris Yotov =

Azerbaijani rower

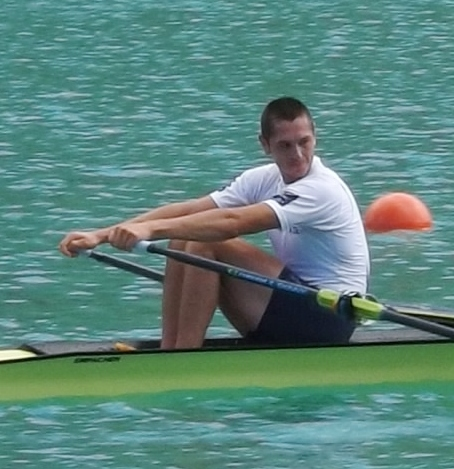
- Yotov in 2015

Personal information
- Nationality: Azerbaijan/Bulgaria
- Born: 25 February 1996 (age 30) Sofia, Bulgaria
- Height: 1.95 m (6 ft 5 in)
- Weight: 93 kg (205 lb)

Sport
- Sport: Rowing
Medal record
Men's rowing
Representing Azerbaijan
Summer Youth Olympics
Silver medal – second place	2014 Nanjing	Single sculls
World Junior Championships
Bronze medal – third place	2013 Trakai	Single sculls
European Championships
Silver medal – second place	2014 Belgrade	Double sculls
Representing Bulgaria
World U23 Championships
Bronze medal – third place	2018 Poznań	Single sculls

Boris Yotov (born 25 February 1996) is an Azerbaijani and Bulgarian rower of Bulgarian origin. He was selected to represent Azerbaijan at the 2016 Summer Olympics in Rio de Janeiro.
