= Boxing at the Summer Youth Olympics =

Boxing competitions

- Governing body: AIBA
- Events: 13 (men: 9; women: 4)

Games
- 2010; 2014; 2018; 2026

Boxing has featured as a sport at the Youth Olympic Summer Games since its first edition in 2010. The Youth Olympic Games are multi-sport event and the games are held every four years just like the Olympic Games.

== Editions ==
Games	Year	Events	Best Nation
1	2010	11 (11M+0W)	Cuba
2	2014	13 (10M+3W)	Cuba
3	2018	13 (9M+4W)	Russia
4	2026	10 (5M+5W)	India; Uzbekistan

== Format ==
The boxing competition is organized as a set of tournaments, one for each weight class. The number of weight classes has changed over the years and the definition of each class has changed as shown in the following tables.

Men's weight classes
2010	2014	2018
Super Heavyweight +91 kg
Heavyweight; 81–91 kg
Light Heavyweight; 75–81 kg
Middleweight; 69–75 kg
Welterweight; 64–69 kg
Light Welterweight; 60–64 kg
Lightweight; 57–60 kg	Lightweight; 56–60 kg	
Featherweight; 54–57 kg	Bantamweight; 52–56 kg	
Bantamweight; 51–54 kg	Bantamweight; 52–56 kg	
Flyweight; 48–51 kg	Flyweight; 49–52	
Light Flyweight -48 kg	Light Flyweight; 46–49 kg	
11	10	9

Women's weight classes
2014	2018
Middleweight; 69–75 kg
Lightweight; 57–60 kg
	Featherweight; 54–57 kg
Flyweight; 48–51 kg
3	4

== Medal table ==
As of the 2018 Summer Youth Olympics.

Rank	Nation	Gold	Silver	Bronze	Total
1	Cuba	5	1	0	6
2	Uzbekistan	4	2	4	10
3	Great Britain	4	0	4	8
4	Russia	3	2	1	6
5	Brazil	3	0	1	4
6	Kazakhstan	2	5	2	9
7	Thailand	2	3	1	6
8	Italy	2	2	2	6
9	India	2	1	1	4
9	United States	2	1	1	4
11	Puerto Rico	2	0	1	3
12	Germany	2	0	0	2
12	Lithuania	2	0	0	2
14	Azerbaijan	1	3	1	5
15	Ireland	1	2	2	5
16	Australia	1	2	1	4
16	Ukraine	1	2	1	4
18	Japan	1	1	3	5
19	China	1	1	1	3
19	Venezuela	1	1	1	3
21	Bulgaria	1	1	0	2
21	France	1	1	0	2
23	Argentina	1	0	3	4
24	Poland	1	0	1	2
25	Georgia	1	0	0	1
26	Algeria	0	3	1	4
27	Colombia	0	2	1	3
28	Turkey	0	1	4	5
29	Mexico	0	1	2	3
30	Croatia	0	1	1	2
31	Chinese Taipei	0	1	0	1
31	Dominican Republic	0	1	0	1
31	Israel	0	1	0	1
31	Morocco	0	1	0	1
31	Nauru	0	1	0	1
31	New Zealand	0	1	0	1
31	Nigeria	0	1	0	1
31	Slovakia	0	1	0	1
39	Egypt	0	0	3	3
39	Hungary	0	0	3	3
41	Armenia	0	0	2	2
41	Canada	0	0	2	2
41	Sweden	0	0	2	2
44	Moldova	0	0	1	1
44	Spain	0	0	1	1
44	Turkmenistan	0	0	1	1
44	United Arab Emirates	0	0	1	1
Totals (47 entries)		47	47	57	151

== Participating nations ==
Nation	10	14	18	Years
Afghanistan	1		1	2
Albania			2	1
Algeria		1	4	2
American Samoa			1	1
Argentina	1	1	3	3
Armenia	1	2		2
Australia	2	2	2	3
Azerbaijan	3	3	2	3
Belarus	1	2		2
Brazil	1		3	2
Bulgaria	1	3	1	3
Canada			2	1
Chile			1	1
China		2		1
Chinese Taipei		2		1
Colombia	1			1
Croatia		3		1
Cuba	3	3		2
Czech Republic	1		1	2
Dominican Republic		1		1
Ecuador	1			1
Egypt	1		3	2
Finland		1		1
France	1	1	1	3
Georgia		1		1
Germany	3	1		2
Great Britain	1	3	4	3
Greece	1			1
Grenada	1			1
Hungary	2	3	1	3
India	2	2	1	3
Iran	1		1	2
Ireland	2	3	3	3
Italy	1	4	2	3
Japan		3		1
Kazakhstan	1	4	5	3
Kosovo			1	1
Kyrgyzstan	1			1
Lithuania	2			1
Mexico	1	1	1	3
Moldova	1			1
Mongolia	1			1
Morocco			4	1
Nauru	1		1	2
New Zealand	1		2	2
Nigeria	1		2	2
Norway		1		1
Poland	1	1	1	3
Puerto Rico	1		2	2
Romania		1		1
Russia	3	3	4	3
Rwanda	1			1
Samoa			3	1
Saint Lucia	1			1
Seychelles	1			1
Singapore	1			1
Slovakia		1	1	2
South Korea	1	1		2
Sweden		1		1
Tajikistan	1			1
Thailand			5	1
Tunisia		1	1	2
Turkey	2	5		2
Turkmenistan	1			1
Ukraine	2	4	2	3
United States	1	4	3	3
Uzbekistan	3	3	4	3
Venezuela	2		1	2
Zambia	1			1
No. of boys boxers	66	60	54	
No. of girls boxers	0	18	28	
No. of boxers	66	78	82	
No. of nations	48	36	38	
No. of new nations	48	13	8	

== See also ==
- Boxing at the Summer Olympics
