= Weightlifting at the 2018 Summer Youth Olympics – Boys' 85 kg =

Boys' 85 kg at the III Summer Youth Olympic Games
- Venue: Parque Polideportivo Roca
- Dates: October 12
- Competitors: 7 from 7 nations

Medalists
1st place, gold medalist(s)		Cristiano Ficco	Italy
2nd place, silver medalist(s)		Tarmenkhan Babayev	Azerbaijan
3rd place, bronze medalist(s)		Ali Al-Othman	Saudi Arabia

These are the results for the boys' 85 kg event at the 2018 Summer Youth Olympics.

== Results ==
Rank	Name	Nation	Body Weight	Snatch (kg)				Clean & Jerk (kg)				Total (kg)
Rank	Name	Nation	Body Weight	1	2	3	Res	1	2	3	Res	Total (kg)
1st place, gold medalist(s)	Cristiano Ficco	Italy		145	~~150~~	~~150~~	145	170	174	180	180	325
2nd place, silver medalist(s)	Tarmenkhan Babayev	Azerbaijan		137	142	~~146~~	142	160	174	~~178~~	174	316
3rd place, bronze medalist(s)	Ali Al-Othman	Saudi Arabia		130	~~135~~	~~135~~	130	163	169	~~173~~	169	299
4	Amir Reza Askaridoun	Iran		~~128~~	128	133	133	~~159~~	159	165	165	298
5	Nicolas Rodrigo Cuevas Iborra	Chile		118	124	~~129~~	124	140	145	~~155~~	145	269
6	Farhan Amjad	Pakistan		113	~~116~~	~~116~~	113	140	~~147~~	~~147~~	140	253
	Gerasimos Galiatsatos	Greece		~~150~~	~~150~~	~~150~~	—					DNF
