= Wrestling at the 2018 Summer Youth Olympics – Boys' freestyle 65 kg =

Boys' freestyle 65kg at the III Summer Youth Olympic Games
- Venue: Asia Pavilion
- Date: 14 October 2018
- Competitors: 6 from 6 nations

Medalists
1st place, gold medalist(s)		Turan Bayramov; Azerbaijan
2nd place, silver medalist(s)		Mohammad Karimi; Iran
3rd place, bronze medalist(s)		Inayat Ullah; Pakistan

The boys' freestyle 65 kg competition at the 2018 Summer Youth Olympics was held on 14 October, at the Asia Pavilion.

== Competition format ==
As there were less than six wrestlers in a weight category, the pool phase will be run as a single group competing in a round-robin format. Ranking within the groups is used to determine the pairings for the final phase.

== Schedule ==
All times are in local time (UTC-3).

Date	Time	Round
Sunday, 14 October 2018	10:10; 10:35; 11:00; 17:40	Round 1 Round 2 Round 3 Finals

== Results ==
Legend

- F — Won by fall

Group Stages

Qualified for the Gold-medal match
Qualified for the Bronze-medal match
Qualified for the 5th/6th Place Match

Group A

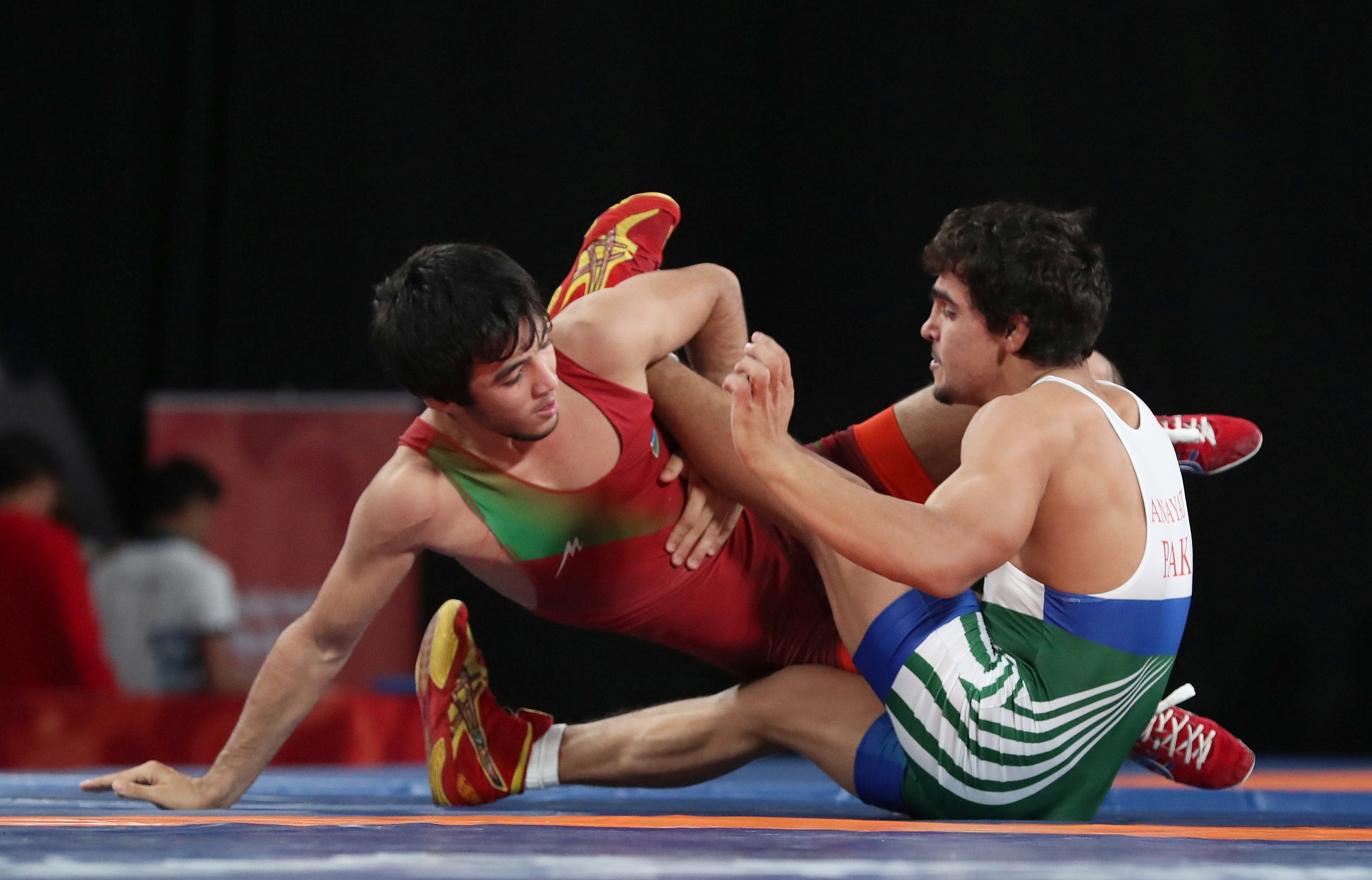
Turan Bayramov vs. Inayat Ullah

Pos	Athlete	Pld	W	L	CP	TP	Qualification
1	Turan Bayramov (AZE)	2	2	0	7	18	Gold-medal match
2	Inayat Ullah (PAK)	2	1	1	4	13	Bronze-medal match
3	Westerly Ainsley (NZL)	2	0	2	1	2	Classification 5th/6th place match

Source: UWW

	Score		CP
Westerly Ainsley (NZL)	2–13	Inayat Ullah (PAK)	1–4 VSU1
Turan Bayramov (AZE)	10–0	Westerly Ainsley (NZL)	4–0 VSU
Inayat Ullah (PAK)	0–8	Turan Bayramov (AZE)	0–3 VPO

Group B

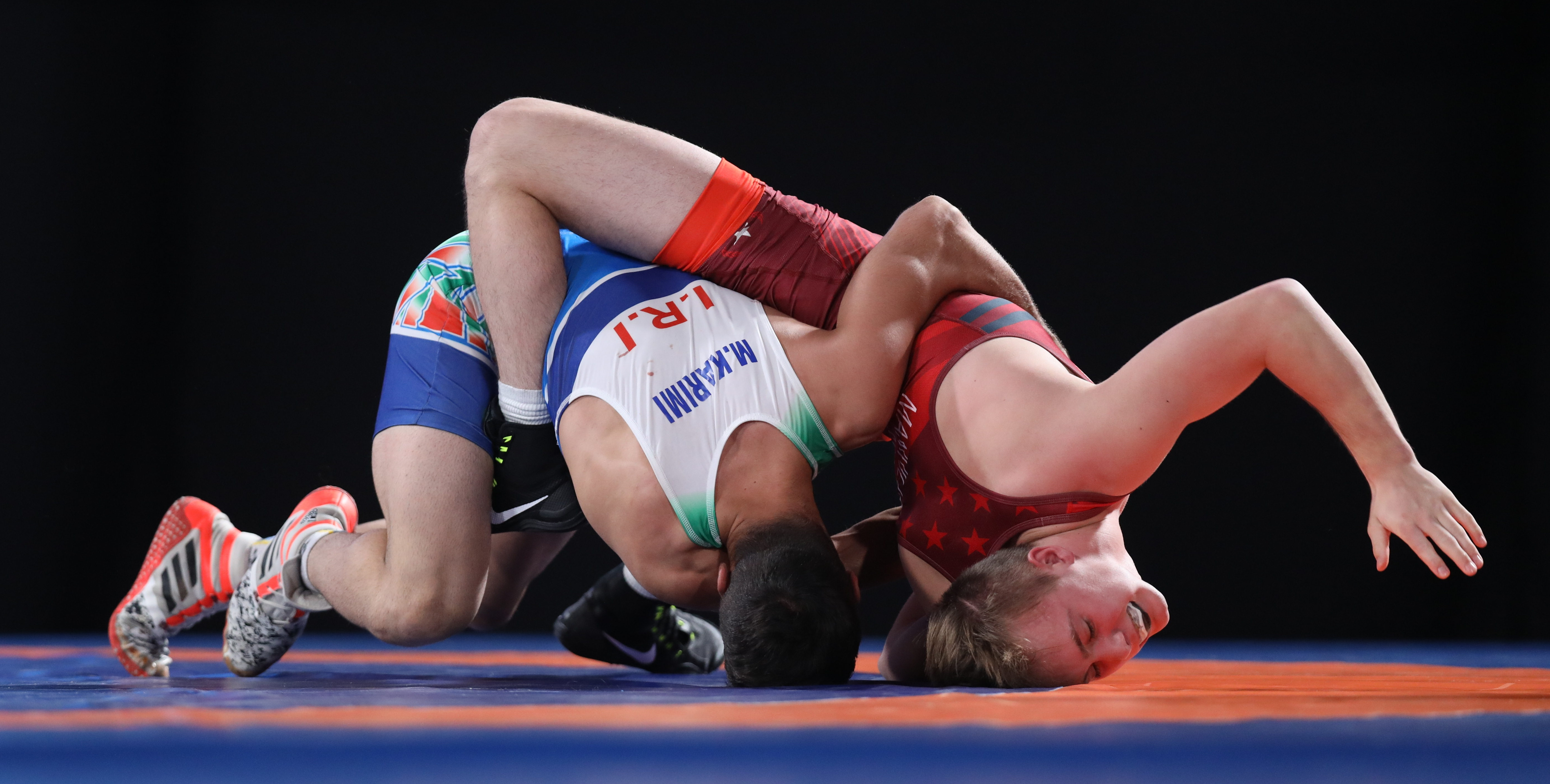
Carson Manville vs. Mohammad Karimi

Pos	Athlete	Pld	W	L	CP	TP	Qualification
1	Mohammad Karimi (IRI)	2	2	0	7	16	Gold-medal match
2	Carson Manville (USA)	2	1	1	3	12	Bronze-medal match
3	Fathi Tarek Ismail (EGY)	2	0	2	2	8	Classification 5th/6th place match

Source: UWW

	Score		CP
Fathi Tarek Ismail (EGY)	5–6	Mohammad Karimi (IRI)	1–3 VPO1
Carson Manville (USA)	12–3	Fathi Tarek Ismail (EGY)	3–1 VPO1
Mohammad Karimi (IRI)	10–0	Carson Manville (USA)	4–0 VSU

=== Finals ===
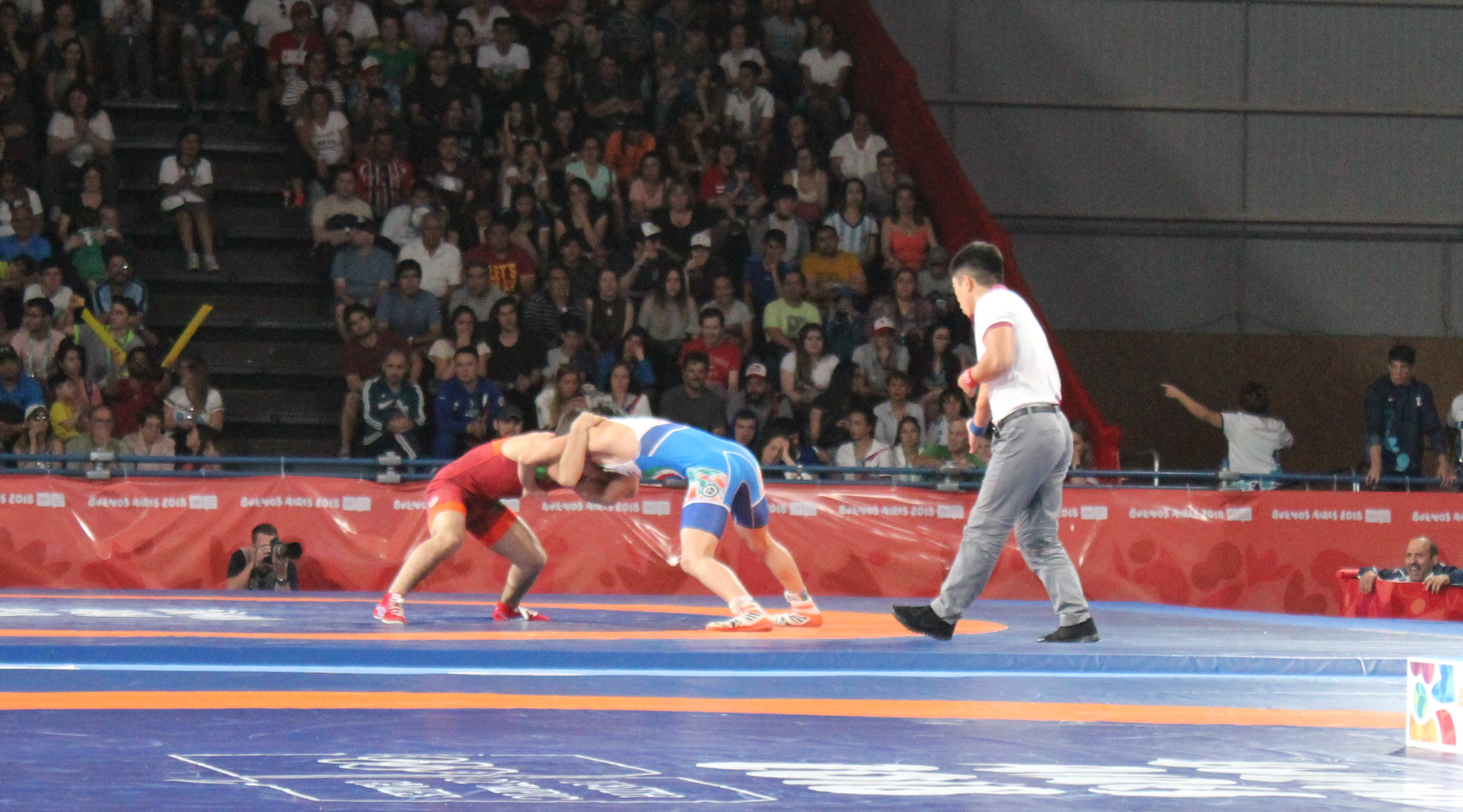
Turan Bayramov vs. Mohammad Karimi

Gold-medal match
Turan Bayramov (AZE)	6
Mohammad Karimi (IRI)	1

Bronze-medal match
Inayat Ullah (PAK)	6
Carson Manville (USA)	2

Classification 5th/6th place match
Westerly Ainsley (NZL)	0
Fathi Tarek Ismail (EGY)	7

== Final rankings ==
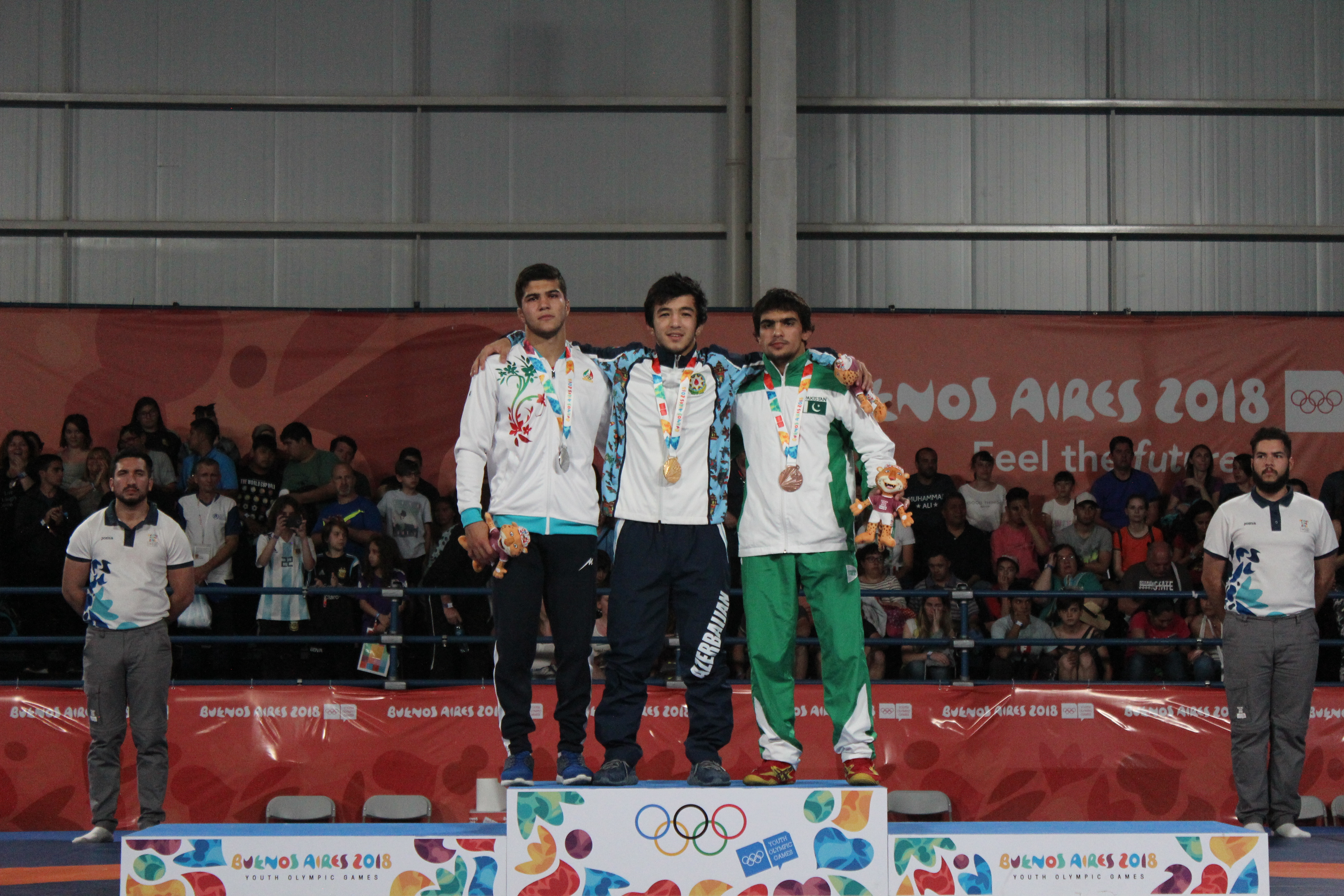
Medal ceremony

Rank	Athlete
1st place, gold medalist(s)	Turan Bayramov (AZE)
2nd place, silver medalist(s)	Mohammad Karimi (IRI)
3rd place, bronze medalist(s)	Inayat Ullah (PAK)
4	Carson Manville (USA)
5	Fathi Tarek Ismail (EGY)
6	Westerly Ainsley (NZL)
