= Tarmenkhan Babayev =

Azerbaijani weightlifter (born 2002)

Personal information
- Born: 8 January 2002 (age 24)

Sport
- Country: Azerbaijan
- Sport: Weightlifting
Medal record
Men's weightlifting
Representing Azerbaijan
Summer Youth Olympics
Silver medal – second place	2018 Buenos Aires	85 kg
European Youth Weightlifting Championships
Gold medal – first place	2018 San Donato Milanese	94 kg

Tarmenkhan Babayev (born 8 January 2002) is an Azerbaijani weightlifter. He won the silver medal in the 85 kg event at the 2018 Summer Youth Olympics held in Buenos Aires, Argentina.

In 2018, he also won the gold medal in men's 94 kg event at the European Youth Weightlifting Championships held in San Donato Milanese, Italy.
