= Inayat Ullah (wrestler) =

Pakistani freestyle wrestler (born 2001)

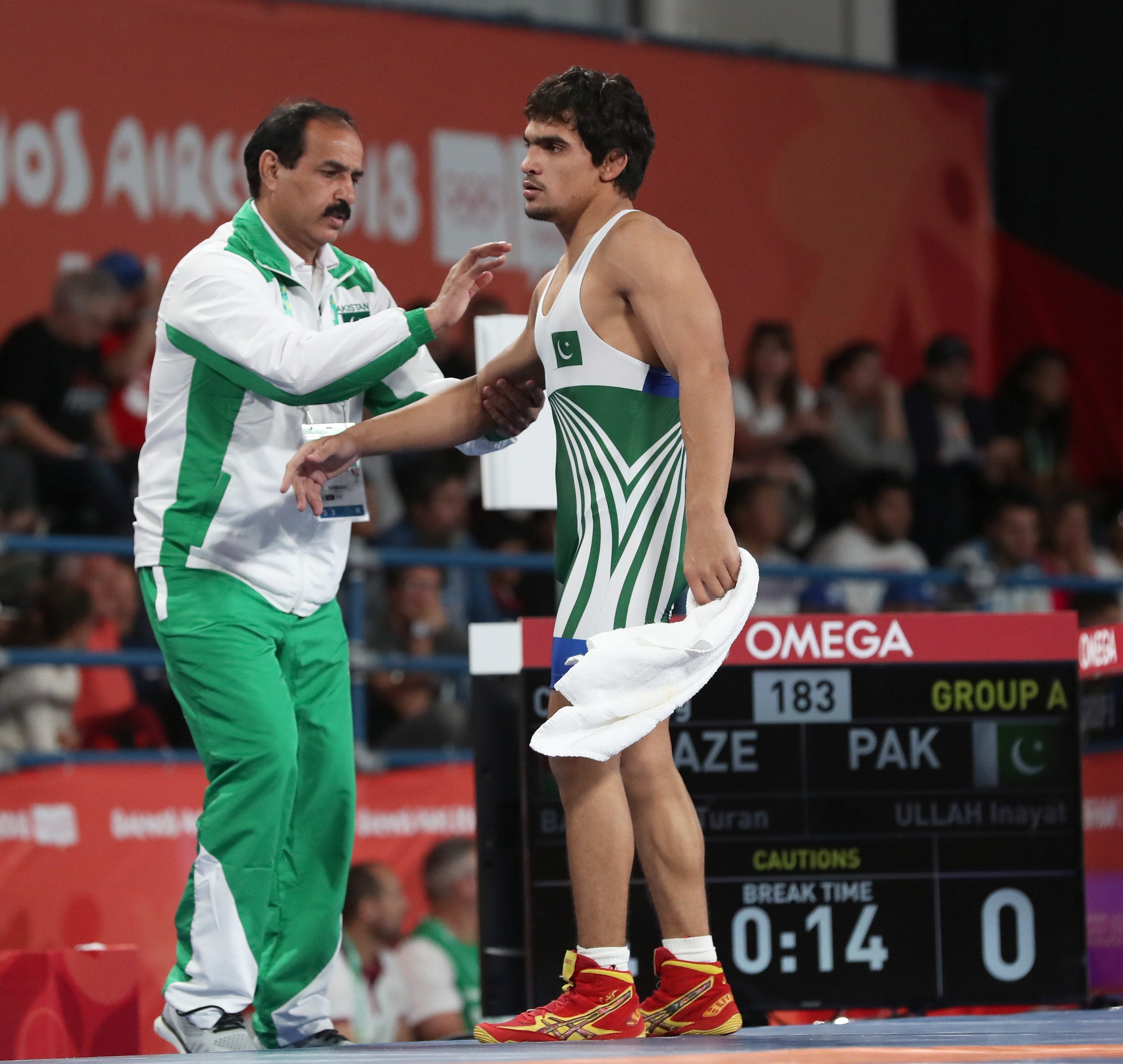
- Inayat Ullah at the 2018 Youth Olympics

Personal information
- Born: 5 September 2001 (age 25) Peshawar, Pakistan
- Height: 1.74 m (5 ft 9 in)

Sport
- Sport: Wrestling
- Event: Freestyle
Medal record
Men's freestyle wrestling
Representing Pakistan
Commonwealth Games
Bronze medal – third place	2022 Birmingham	65kg
Youth Olympic Games
Bronze medal – third place	2018 Buenos Aires	65kg

Inayat Ullah (born 5 September 2001) is a Pakistani freestyle wrestler. He won bronze medals in the 65 kg freestyle event at the 2022 Commonwealth Games and the 2018 Youth Olympic Games.
