= Caileigh Filmer =

Canadian rower (born 1996)

Personal information
- Nationality: Canadian
- Born: December 18, 1996 (age 29) Victoria, British Columbia, Canada
- Height: 169 cm (5 ft 7 in)
- Weight: 76 kg (168 lb)

Sport
- Country: Canada
- Sport: Rowing
- Events: Coxless pair, Coxless four, Eight
- College team: University of California, Berkeley
Medal record
Women's rowing
Representing Canada
Olympic Games
Silver medal – second place	2024 Paris	Eight
Bronze medal – third place	2020 Tokyo	Coxless pair
World Championships
Gold medal – first place	2018 Plovdiv	Coxless pair
Bronze medal – third place	2019 Ottensheim	Coxless pair
World Championships (U23)
Gold medal – first place	2017 Plovdiv	Eight
Silver medal – second place	2015 Plovdiv	Coxless four
Youth Olympics
Bronze medal – third place	2014 Nanjing	Coxless pair
World Championships (Junior)
Silver medal – second place	2014 Hamburg	Coxless pair

Caileigh Filmer (born December 18, 1996) is a Canadian rower from Victoria, British Columbia.

Caileigh graduated from Mount Douglas Secondary in 2014 and started at University of California in fall of 2014. She won a bronze medal at the 2014 Summer Youth Olympics in the coxless pair event alongside Larissa Werbicki.

At only 19 years of age, she was selected to her first Olympic Games to represent Canada at the 2016 Summer Olympics in the women's eight event. She went on to sit in the stroke seat of the crew that placed fifth in the Olympic final.

In 2017 she became the U-23 world champion in the women’s eight at the U-23 world championships in Bulgaria.

The following year, she became the 2018 world champion in the women's coxless pair winning her title with Hillary Janssens at the 2018 World Rowing Championships in Plovdiv.

She next won a bronze medal in the women’s pair at the 2020 Summer Olympics in Tokyo.

She went on to win a silver medal at the 2024 Paris Olympics, in the women’s eight.
