= Cristina Popescu (rower) =

Romanian rower

Personal information
- Nationality: Romanian
- Born: 15 April 1996 (age 30) Târgu Jiu, Romania

Sport
- Sport: Rowing

Cristina Popescu (born 15 April 1996) is a Romanian rower. She competed in the women's coxless four event at the 2020 Summer Olympics.
