= List of Youth Olympic medalists in cycling =

This is the complete list of Youth Olympic medalists in cycling.

== Current program ==
=== Boy's events ===
==== Team ====
Event	Gold	Silver	Bronze
2014 Nanjing	Colombia; Brandon Rivera; John Rodriguez Salazar	Denmark; Mikkel Honore; Rasmus Salling	Netherlands; Niek Kimmann; Wiebe Scholten
2018 Buenos Aires	Kazakhstan; Gleb Brussenskiy; Yevgeniy Fedorov	Luxembourg; Nicolas Kess; Arthur Kluckers	Great Britain; Harry Birchill; Sean Flynn

=== Girl's events ===
==== Team ====
Event	Gold	Silver	Bronze
2014 Nanjing	Italy; Sofia Beggin; Chiara Teocchi	Czech Republic; Nikola Noskova; Barbora Prudkova	Denmark; Anna Madsen; Pernille Mathiesen
2018 Buenos Aires	Denmark; Sofie Heby Pedersen; Mie Saabye	Austria; Laura Stigger; Hannah Streicher	Hungary; Virág Buzsáki; Kata Blanka Vas

=== Mixed events ===
==== Team ====
Games	Gold	Silver	Bronze
2010 Singapore	Colombia; Jessica Lergada; Jhonnatan Botero Villegas; Brayan Ramírez; David Oquendo	Italy; Alessia Bulleri; Andrea Righettini; Nicolas Marini; Mattia Furlan	Netherlands; Maartje Hereijgers; Thijs Zuurbier; Friso Roscam Abbing Ijpeij; Twan van Gendt
2014 Nanjing	Czech Republic; Barbora Prudkova; Jan Rajchart; Roman Lehky; Nikola Noskova	Italy; Chiara Teocchi; Federico Mandelli; Manuel Todaro; Sofia Beggin	Ukraine; Darya Tkachova; Vladyslav Nizitskyi; Rinat Udod; Anzhelika Teterych

==== BMX racing ====
Games	Gold	Silver	Bronze
2018 Buenos Aires	Russia; Ilia Beskrovnyy; Varvara Ovchinnikova	Switzerland; Kevin Schunck; Zoé Claessens	Colombia; Juan Ramírez; Gabriela Bolle

==== BMX Freestyle park ====
Games	Gold	Silver	Bronze
2018 Buenos Aires	Argentina; Iñaki Iriartes; Agustina Roth Germany; Evan Brandes; Lara Lessmann	Not awarded	Japan; Kanami Tanno; Yuma Oshimo
