= Colombia at the Youth Olympics =

- IOC code: COL
- NOC: Colombian Olympic Committee
- Website: www.olimpicocol.co (in Spanish)
- Medals Ranked 33rd: Gold 7 Silver 7 Bronze 5 Total 19

Summer appearances
- 2010; 2014; 2018

Winter appearances
- 2016; 2020; 2024

Colombia first participated at the Youth Olympic Games at the inaugural 2010 Games in Singapore. Colombia has sent a team to each Summer Youth Olympics and participated for the first time at the Winter Youth Olympics in the 2016 edition in Lillehammer. The Colombian city of Medellín submitted a bid to host the 2018 Summer Youth Olympics, but in a voting process in 2013, lost the games to the Argentine capital, Buenos Aires.

== Medal tables ==
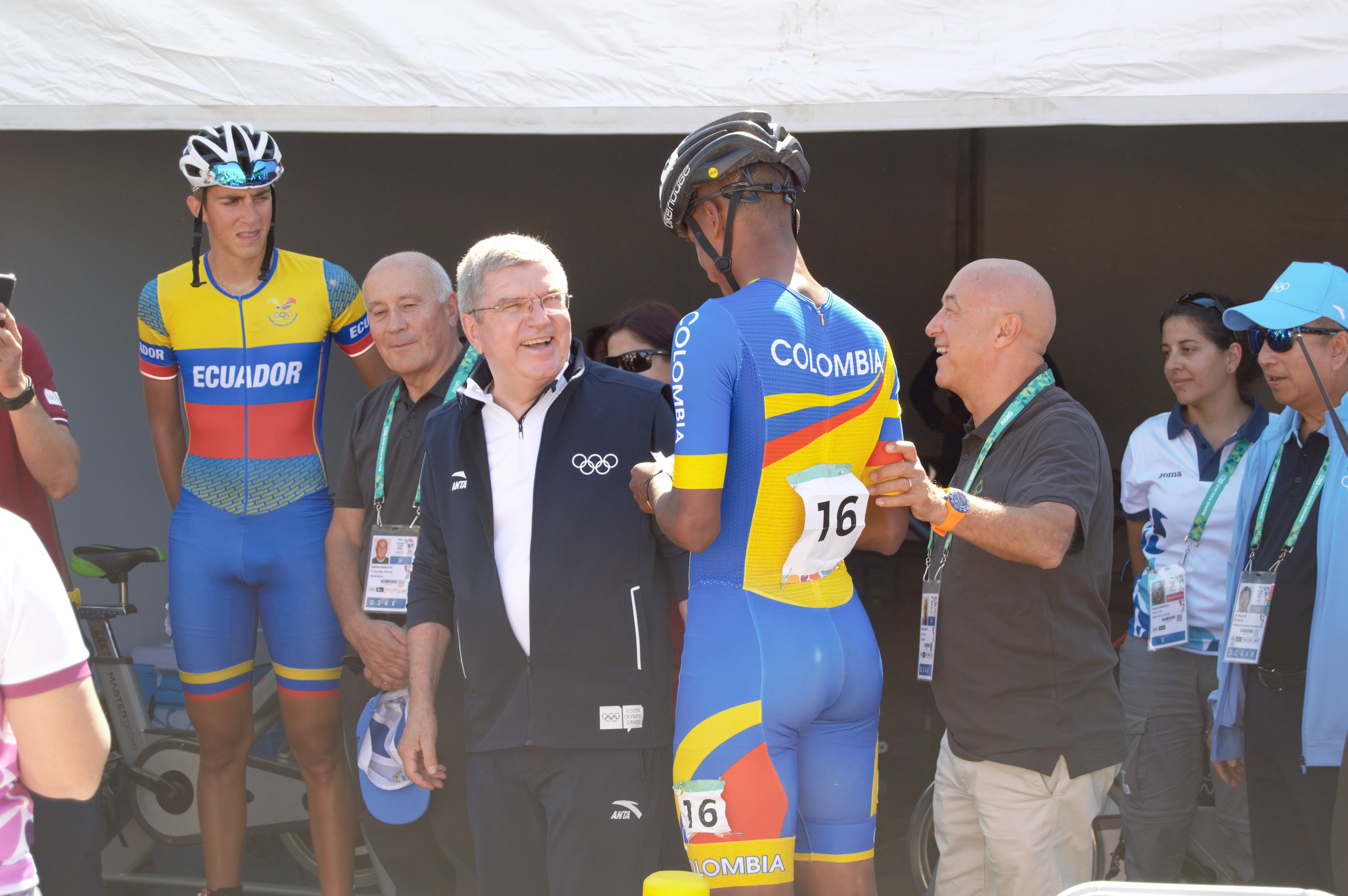
IOC President Thomas Bach congratulating roller skater Jhony Angulo Reina for his gold medal.

Competing at the Youth Olympic Games, Colombian athletes have won a total of 18 medals in 9 different sports. Weightlifter José Gavino Mena won the country's first medal at this competition at the inaugural edition held in Singapore in 2010. As in the senior Olympics, weightlifting is the most successful sport for the country with five medals won, although none of them is gold. Cycling is also a successful sport, contributing with two gold, and one bronze medals. Roller speed skating is a very popular sport in Colombia, hence the country's domination in that sport at international competitions. The sport was introduced to the Olympic program for the Buenos Aires Games in 2018, and Colombian skaters won the two events held at those games. The medals won in tennis and equestrian in 2010 were the first for the country at Olympic competitions. Indeed, in tennis, the Colombians have won a complete set of medals as of 2018. Taekwondo practitioner Debbie Yopasa Gómez was the first female medalist for Colombia at the Youth Olympics, winning a bronze medal in Nanjing 2014. Despite being a tropical country, Colombia made its debut at the Winter Youth Olympics in Lillehammer 2016. Michael Poettoz was the sole representative of the country at those games (he later went on to become the first person born in Colombia to qualify to compete at the senior Winter Olympics in PyeongChang 2018). Tennis player Camila Osorio is the only Colombian athlete to have won two medals for the country at the youth games and the only one (including senior Olympic Games) to have won two medals at a single edition of the Olympics. Diver Daniel Restrepo won Colombia's first medal in diving at Olympic competitions.

=== Medals by Summer Youth Games ===
Games	Athletes	Gold	Silver	Bronze	Total	Rank
2010 Singapore	23	2	3	0	5	22
(China) 2014 Nanjing	34	1	0	2	3	46
(Argentina) 2018 Buenos Aires	53	4	3	3	10	14
(Senegal) 2026 Dakar	future event					
Total		7	6	5	18	22

=== Medals by Winter Youth Games ===
Games	Athletes	Gold	Silver	Bronze	Total	Rank
(Austria) 2012 Innsbruck	Did not participate					
(Norway) 2016 Lillehammer	1	0	0	0	0	–
(Switzerland) 2020 Lausanne	2	0	1	0	1	27
(South Korea) 2024 Gangwon	5	0	0	0	0	–
Total		0	1	0	1	35

=== Medals by summer sport ===
Leading in that sport

Sport	Gold	Silver	Bronze	Total
Cycling	2	0	1	3
Roller speed skating	2	0	0	2
Tennis	1	1	1	3
Athletics	1	0	0	1
Diving	1	0	0	1
Weightlifting	0	3	2	5
Boxing	0	1	0	1
Equestrian	0	1	0	1
Taekwondo	0	0	1	1
Totals (9 entries)	7	6	5	18

=== Medals by winter sport ===
Leading in that sport

Sport	Gold	Silver	Bronze	Total
Speed skating	0	1	0	1
Totals (1 entries)	0	1	0	1

=== Medalists by Summer Games ===
Medal	Name	Games	Sport	Event
Gold	Juan Sebastián Gómez	Singapore 2010	Tennis	Boys' singles
Gold	Mixed Cycling Team Jessica Lergada; Jhonnatan Botero Villegas; Brayan Ramírez; David Oquendo	Singapore 2010	Cycling	Combined mixed team
Silver	José Mena	Singapore 2010	Weightlifting	Boys' 62 kg
Silver	Mario Gamboa	Singapore 2010	Equestrian	Individual Jumping
Silver	Juan Carlos Carrillo	Singapore 2010	Boxing	Men's Middle 75 kg
Gold	Boys' Cycling Team Brandon Rivera; Jhon Anderson Rodríguez	(China) Nanjing 2014	Cycling	Boys' team
Bronze	Debbie Yopasa	(China) Nanjing 2014	Taekwondo	Girls' 63 kg
Bronze	Andrés Caicedo	(China) Nanjing 2014	Weightlifting	Boys' 69 kg
Gold	Gabriela Rueda	(Argentina) Buenos Aires 2018	Roller speed skating	Girls' combined
Gold	Jhony Angulo	(Argentina) Buenos Aires 2018	Roller speed skating	Boys' combined
Gold	Daniel Restrepo	(Argentina) Buenos Aires 2018	Diving	Boys' 3m springboard
Gold	Valeria Cabezas	(Argentina) Buenos Aires 2018	Athletics	Girls' 400 m hurdles
Silver	Yineth Santoya	(Argentina) Buenos Aires 2018	Weightlifting	Girls' 48 kg
Silver	Kely Junkar	(Argentina) Buenos Aires 2018	Weightlifting	Girls' 53 kg
Silver	Mixed Double Team Camila Osorio; Nicolás Mejía	(Argentina) Buenos Aires 2018	Tennis	Mixed doubles
Bronze	Mixed BMX Cycling Team Gabriela Bolle; Juan Ramírez	(Argentina) Buenos Aires 2018	Cycling	Mixed BMX racing
Bronze	Estiven Villar	(Argentina) Buenos Aires 2018	Weightlifting	Boys' 62 kg
Bronze	Camila Osorio	(Argentina) Buenos Aires 2018	Tennis	Girls' singles

=== Medalists by Winter Games ===
Medal	Name	Games	Sport	Event
Silver	Diego Amaya	(Switzerland) Lausanne 2020	Speed skating	Boys' Mass Start

== See also ==
- Colombia at the Olympics
- Colombia at the Paralympics
- Colombia at the Pan American Games
