= Colombia at the 2018 Winter Olympics =

- Flag of Colombia
- IOC code: COL
- NOC: Colombian Olympic Committee
- Website: www.olimpicocol.co (in Spanish)

in Pyeongchang, South Korea 9–25 February 2018
- Competitors: 4 in 3 sports
- Flag bearer: Pedro Causil (opening)
- Medals: Gold 0 Silver 0 Bronze 0 Total 0

Winter Olympics appearances (overview)
- 2010; 2014; 2018; 2022; 2026

Colombia competed at the 2018 Winter Olympics in Pyeongchang, South Korea, from 9 to 25 February 2018. The country returned to the Winter Olympics after last competing in 2010, which also marked its debut. The Colombian team consisted of three males and one female, competing in three different sports.

== Competitors ==
The following is the list of number of competitors participating in the Colombian delegation per sport.

Sport	Men	Women	Total
Alpine skiing	1	0	1
Cross-country skiing	1	0	1
Speed skating	1	1	2
Total	3	1	4

== Alpine skiing ==
Colombia qualified one male athlete, Michael Poettoz. Poettoz was born in Cali and was adopted by a French family when he was aged 21 months. Poettoz grew up and learned how to ski in Les Carroz d'Araches, France. Poettoz also represented the country at the Winter Youth Olympics in 2016 in Lillehammer, Norway. Poettoz's upbringing is similar to Madagascar's Mialitiana Clerc, who also qualified to compete at the 2018 Games.

Athlete	Event	Run 1		Run 2		Total		
Athlete	Event	Time	Rank	Time	Rank	Time	Behind	Rank
Michael Poettoz	Men's slalom	57.46	44	1:00.00	37	1:57.46	+18.47	37
Michael Poettoz	Men's giant slalom	1:21.41	73	DNF				

== Cross-country skiing ==
Colombia qualified one male athlete, Sebastián Uprimny. Uprimny was born to Colombian parents in Paris, France. Colombia made its Winter Olympics debut in the sport.

Distance

Athlete	Event	Final		
Athlete	Event	Time	Deficit	Rank
Sebastián Uprimny	Men's 15 km freestyle	58:08.1	+24:24.2	115

== Speed skating ==
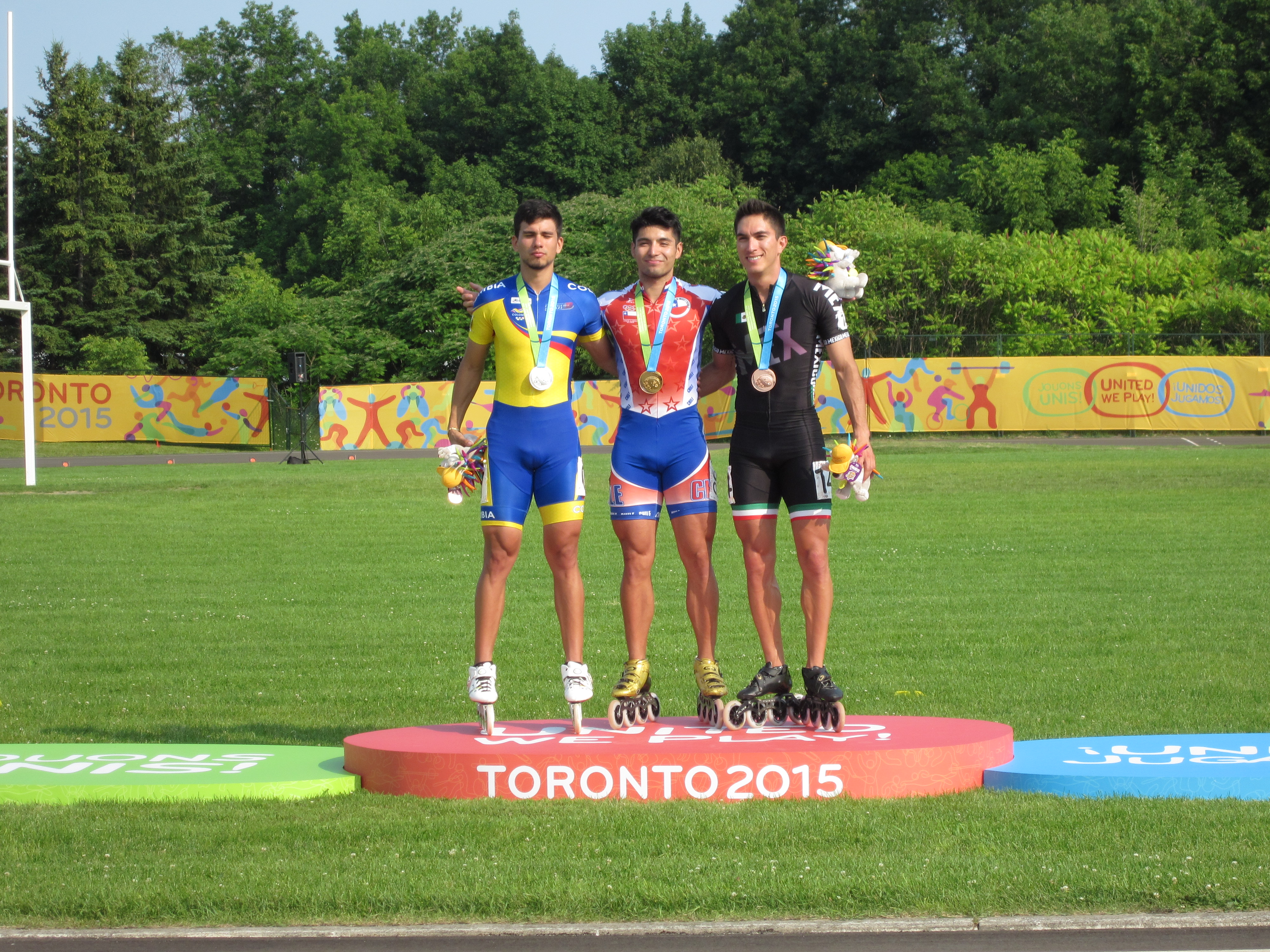
Pedro Causil (far left) pictured on the podium after winning a silver medal in the men's 200 metres time-trial roller speed skating event at the 2015 Pan American Games in Toronto, Canada, represented the country in two speed skating events

Colombia is one of the strongest nations in inline speed skating, as it was the overall champion since 2010 at the World Roller Speed Skating Championships. However the sport is not on the Olympic program. In 2015, the Colombian Federation of Inline Skating was approved by the International Skating Union to become a member in the (ice) speed skating branch, allowing the nation the possibility to qualify for the Winter Olympics. One Colombian male skater won a provisional quota spot in the men's 500 m and 1000 m event. Causil was the first speed skater from South America to compete at the Winter Olympics, also marking Colombia's debut in the sport. Colombia was later reallocated a spot for a female speed skater in the women's mass start. This was because of the reallocation of quotas from Russian athletes.

Individual

Athlete	Event	Race	
Athlete	Event	Time	Rank
Pedro Causil	Men's 500 m	35.196	20
Pedro Causil	Men's 1000 m	1:10.71	34

Mass start

Athlete	Event	Semifinal			Final		
Athlete	Event	Points	Time	Rank	Points	Time	Rank
Laura Gómez	Women's mass start	0	8:54.99	10	Did not advance		

== See also ==
- Colombia at the 2016 Winter Youth Olympics
