= Colombian National Cross-Country Skiing =

Flag of Colombia

The Colombian National Cross-Country Skiing Team represents Colombia in international cross-country skiing competitions, including events sanctioned by the International Ski Federation (FIS) and the Winter Olympic Games. Despite Colombia's tropical climate and lack of permanent snow conditions, the team has maintained a presence in international Nordic skiing through athletes training and competing primarily abroad.

== History ==
The origins of Colombia's cross-country skiing program trace to the early 2010s and are associated with Paul Bragiel, who founded the nation's ski team and competed internationally. Although Bragiel did not qualify for the Winter Olympics himself, his efforts helped lay the groundwork for future Colombian participants.

Colombia made its Olympic debut in cross-country skiing at the 2018 Winter Olympics in Pyeongchang, South Korea, when Sebastián Uprimny became the first Colombian athlete to compete in the discipline at the Winter Games.

The team continued its Olympic presence at the 2022 Winter Olympics in Beijing, where Carlos Quintana represented Colombia in cross-country skiing events, marking the nation's second consecutive appearance in the sport at the Games.

== Governance ==
The Colombian National Cross-Country Skiing Team operates under the authority of the Comité Olímpico Colombiano, which is responsible for athlete selection, international representation, and compliance with qualification standards established by the FIS and the International Olympic Committee.

== Olympic results ==
Colombia has participated in cross-country skiing at the Winter Olympic Games. Results include:

Games	Athlete(s)	Event(s)	Placement
2018 Pyeongchang	Sebastián Uprimny	Men's 15 km freestyle	111th
2022 Beijing	Carlos Quintana	Men's Sprint	88th
2022 Beijing	Carlos Quintana	Men's 15 km classical	95th

== National championships ==
The Colombian Cross-Country National Championships determine the annual national champion. Due to limited snow conditions in Colombia, national championship events and qualifying competitions are usually held abroad or as part of internationally sanctioned races.

Year	National Champion
2013	Paul Bragiel
2014	Paul Bragiel
2015	Paul Bragiel
2016	Paul Bragiel
2017	Jhon Acevedo
2018	Sebastián Uprimny
2019	Sebastián Uprimny
2020	Sebastián Uprimny
2021	Carlos Quintana
2022	Carlos Quintana
2023	Carlos Quintana
2024	Carlos Quintana
2025	Fredrik Fodstad

== Notable athletes ==
- Paul Bragiel – Founder of the Colombian cross-country skiing program and multiple-time national champion.
- Sebastián Uprimny – First Colombian cross-country skier to compete at the Winter Olympics (2018).
- Carlos Quintana – Colombian cross-country skier and Winter Olympic competitor (2022).

== See also ==
- Colombia at the Winter Olympics
- Cross-country skiing
- Sebastián Uprimny
- Paul Bragiel
