= Cycling at the Summer Youth Olympics =

- Governing body: UCI
- Events: 4 (men: 1; women: 1; mixed: 2)

Games
- 2010; 2014; 2018; 2026

Cycling has been included in the Summer Youth Olympic Games since their inauguration at the 2010 Summer Youth Olympics, at which one event was held. Unlike the Summer Olympics, track cycling is not included, while the program features BMX racing, road cycling and mountain bike racing.

== Summary ==
Games	Year	Events	Best Nation
1	2010	1	Colombia
2	2014	3	Italy
3	2018	4	Denmark
4	2026	4	Russia

== Format ==
At the 2010 Summer Youth Olympics, a combined mixed-gender team event with sub-events in the disciplines of BMX, road cycling and mountain biking was held. At the 2014 Summer Youth Olympics instead of competitors competing separately they compete as a team. In the boys' and girls' team events two athletes compete together. Each of the two cyclists must compete in two of the following events, with only one team member competing per event; BMX, Mountain Bike Cross-country Race, Mountain Bike Cross-country Eliminator and Road Time Trial. Both members will also have to compete in the Road Race event. For the mixed team relay, two boys and two girls will form a team. The event will be composed of a Mountain Bike Cross-country Race, performed by one boy and one girl and a Road Race, performed by the other two team members. For NOCs who qualified only two boys or girls lots will be drawn to form combined teams.

== Medal table ==
As of the 2026 Summer Youth Olympics

Rank	Nation	Gold	Silver	Bronze	Total
1	Russia	2	1	1	4
2	Colombia	2	0	1	3
3	Kazakhstan	2	0	0	2
4	Italy	1	3	0	4
5	Czech Republic	1	1	2	4
6	Denmark	1	1	1	3
7	Slovakia	1	1	0	2
8	Belgium	1	0	1	2
9	Argentina	1	0	0	1
9	Germany	1	0	0	1
11	Australia	0	1	1	2
12	Austria	0	1	0	1
12	Luxembourg	0	1	0	1
12	Switzerland	0	1	0	1
15	Great Britain	0	0	1	1
15	Hungary	0	0	1	1
15	Japan	0	0	1	1
15	Netherlands	0	0	1	1
15	Ukraine	0	0	1	1
Totals (19 entries)		13	11	12	36

== Participating nations ==
Nation	10	14	18	Years
Albania		2		1
Algeria		4		1
Argentina	4	4	6	3
Australia	4			1
Austria		4	2	2
Belarus	4	4		2
Belgium	4	4		2
Belize		2		1
Bolivia	4	2	2	3
Brazil	4	4	4	3
Canada	4			1
Chile	4		4	2
China		2	2	2
Colombia	4	4	8	3
Czech Republic	4	4	6	3
Cyprus	4			1
Denmark	4	4	4	3
Ecuador		4	2	2
Egypt		2	2	2
Eritrea	4	2	4	3
Estonia		2		1
Ethiopia			2	1
Germany			4	1
Great Britain			6	1
Greece		2		1
Guatemala		4		1
Hungary	4	4	4	3
Indonesia	4			1
Israel			2	1
Italy	4	4	4	3
Japan	4	4	4	3
Kazakhstan	4	4	4	3
Latvia	4		3	2
Lesotho		2		1
Lithuania		2		1
Luxembourg			4	1
North Macedonia		2		1
Mauritius		2		1
Mexico	4	4	6	3
Morocco		2		1
Namibia		2		1
Netherlands	4	4		2
New Zealand	4		6	2
Poland	4	4	4	3
Portugal	4	4		2
Russia			8	1
Rwanda		2		1
Serbia	4	4		2
Singapore	4			1
Slovakia		2	4	2
Slovenia	4	4	2	3
South Africa	4	4		2
Spain	4	2	2	3
Switzerland	4		6	2
Thailand	4		2	2
Ukraine		4	2	2
Venezuela		2	1	2
Zimbabwe	4			1
No. of boys cyclists	96	64	64	
No. of girls cyclists	32	64	62	
No. of cyclists	128	128	126	
No. of nations	32	41	33	
No. of new nations	32	20	6	

== See also ==
- Cycling at the Summer Olympics
