= Netherlands at the 2024 Winter Youth Olympics =

- Flag of Netherlands
- IOC code: NED
- NOC: Dutch Olympic Committee

in Gangwon, South Korea 19 January 2024 – 1 February 2024
- Competitors: 28 in 6 sports
- Flag bearer (opening): Florijn de Haas
- Flag bearer (closing): TBD
- Medals Ranked 12th: Gold 3 Silver 1 Bronze 1 Total 5

Winter Youth Olympics appearances
- 2012; 2016; 2020; 2024

The Netherlands has competed at the 2024 Winter Youth Olympics in Gangwon, South Korea, from January 19 to February 1, 2024. This was Netherlands's fourth appearance at the Winter Youth Olympic Games, having competed at every Games since the inaugural edition in 2012.

Skeleton athlete Florijn de Haas was the country's flagbearer during the opening ceremony.

== Competitors ==
The following is the list of number of competitors (per gender) participating at the games per sport/discipline.

Sport	Men	Women	Total
Ice hockey	0	13	13
Luge	1	0	1
Short track speed skating	2	2	4
Skeleton	2	1	3
Snowboarding	0	3	3
Speed skating	2	2	4
Total	7	21	28

== Medalists ==
Medal	Name	Sport	Event	Date
Gold	Angel Daleman	Speed skating	Women's 500 metres	22 January
Gold	Angel Daleman	Speed skating	Women's 1500 metres	23 January
Gold	Angel Daleman	Speed skating	Women's mass start	26 January
Silver	Jasmijn Veenhuis	Speed skating	Women's mass start	26 January
Bronze	Angel Daleman; Sem Spruit	Speed skating	Mixed relay	25 January

== Ice hockey ==
The Netherlands qualified a team of thirteen ice hockey players for the women's 3-on-3 tournament.

Roster

Canadian Jennifer Wakefield was the team's head coach.

- Eva Bout
- Janne Breek
- Daylin den Hartog
- Ruth Eldering
- Noa Frank
- Lara Kluijtmans – A
- Livvy Lammers
- Vera Luitwieler
- Evy Stoltenborg
- Luka Treffers
- Felien van der Sluis
- Beer van Oosterhout – C
- Harper Winkler

=== Women's 3x3 tournament ===
Summary

Key:

- GWS – Game winning shots

Team	Event	Group stage								Semifinal	Final	
Team	Event	Opponent Score	Opponent Score	Opponent Score	Opponent Score	Opponent Score	Opponent Score	Opponent Score	Rank	Opponent Score	Opponent Score	Rank
Netherlands	Women's 3x3 tournament	Australia; L 1–6	Mexico; L 2–9	Turkey; L 2–11	China; L 0–17	Hungary; L 0–33	Italy; L 0–27	South Korea; L 0–16	8	Did not advance		8

Preliminary round

Pos	Team	Pld	W	OTW	OTL	L	GF	GA	GD	Pts	Qualification
1	Hungary	7	7	0	0	0	130	5	+125	21	Semifinals
2	China	7	6	0	0	1	70	25	+45	18	Semifinals
3	South Korea (H)	7	4	1	0	2	48	30	+18	14	Semifinals
4	Italy	7	4	0	1	2	67	31	+36	13	Semifinals
5	Turkey	7	3	0	0	4	36	41	−5	9	
6	Australia	7	2	0	0	5	23	75	−52	6	
7	Mexico	7	1	0	0	6	18	71	−53	3	
8	Netherlands	7	0	0	0	7	5	119	−114	0	

Source: IOC
(H) Host

20 January 2024; 16:00	Netherlands	1–6 (1–0, 0–4, 0–2)	Australia	Gangneung Hockey Centre

Game reference
Referees: (Canada) Beatrice Fortin (Ukraine) Anhelina Maifeld

21 January 2024; 12:00	Netherlands	2–9 (2–2, 0–4, 0–3)	Mexico	Gangneung Hockey Centre

Game reference
Referees: (Mexico) María Chávez (Canada) Beatrice Fortin

21 January 2024; 19:00	Netherlands	2–11 (1–2, 0–7, 1–2)	Turkey	Gangneung Hockey Centre

Game reference
Referees: (Finland) Ilona Silander (Malaysia) Mei Wah Wan

22 January 2024; 13:30	China	17–0 (5–0, 6–0, 6–0)	Netherlands	Gangneung Hockey Centre

Game reference
Referees: (Ukraine) Anhelika Maifeld (Malaysia) Wan Mei Wah

22 January 2024; 20:30	Hungary	33–0 (10–0, 14–0, 9–0)	Netherlands	Gangneung Hockey Centre

Game reference
Referees: (Canada) Domenica Maurer (Malaysia) Wan Mei Wah

23 January 2024; 12:00	Netherlands	0–27 (0–5, 0–12, 0–10)	Italy	Gangneung Hockey Centre

Game reference
Referees: (Mexico) María Chávez (Finland) Ilona Silander

23 January 2024; 20:30	South Korea	16–0 (4–0, 5–0, 7–0)	Netherlands	Gangneung Hockey Centre

Game reference
Referees: (Canada) Beatrice Fortin (Finland) Ilona Silander

== Luge ==
The Netherlands qualified one male luger.

Men

Athlete	Event	Run 1		Run 2		Total	
Athlete	Event	Time	Rank	Time	Rank	Time	Rank
Mees van Buren	Singles	50.177	22	49.547	21	1:39.724	22

== Short track speed skating ==
Netherlands qualified four short track speed skaters (two per gender).

Boys

Athlete	Event	Heats		Quarterfinal		Semifinal		Final	
Athlete	Event	Time	Rank	Time	Rank	Time	Rank	Time	Rank
Nick Endeveld	500 m	44.542	4	Did not advance					
Nick Endeveld	1000 m	1:49.769	2 Q	1:30.151	5	Did not advance			
Nick Endeveld	15000	—N/a		3:08.202	5	Did not advance			
Jonas de Jong	500 m	1:14.758	4	Did not advance					
Jonas de Jong	1000 m	1:35.691	3	Did not advance					
Jonas de Jong	15000	—N/a		2:31.604	4	Did not advance			

Girls

Athlete	Event	Heats		Quarterfinal		Semifinal		Final	
Athlete	Event	Time	Rank	Time	Rank	Time	Rank	Time	Rank
Angel Daleman	500 m	44.658	1 Q	44.565	1 Q	1:18.211	5 QB	DNS	
Angel Daleman	1000 m	1:36.804	1 Q	1:33.625	2 Q	1:53.033	5 ADA	PEN	
Angel Daleman	15000	—N/a		2:24.088	2 Q	2:27.134	3 QB	3:12.937	14
Birgit Radt	500 m	46.143	2 Q	45.101	4	Did not advance			
Birgit Radt	1000 m	1:38.369	3	Did not advance					
Birgit Radt	15000	—N/a		PEN		Did not advance			

== Skeleton ==
Netherlands qualified three skeleton athletes

Boys

Athlete	Run 1		Run 2		Total	
Athlete	Time	Rank	Time	Rank	Time	Rank
Sander de Haan	54.50	9	54.72	10	1:49.25	9
Felix de Witt	55.63	14	54.42	8	1:50.05	11

Girls

Athlete	Run 1		Run 2		Total	
Athlete	Time	Rank	Time	Rank	Time	Rank
Florijn de Haas	59.74	16	57.75	15	1:57.49	17

== Snowboarding ==
Halfpipe, Slopestyle, & Big Air

Athlete	Event	Qualification				Final				
Athlete	Event	Run 1	Run 2	Best	Rank	Run 1	Run 2	Run 3	Best/Total	Rank
Katja Dutu	Girls' big air	74.50	70.00	74.50	7 Q	75.75	20.00	68.50	144.25	7
Katja Dutu	Girls' slopestyle	60.50	54.25	60.50	8 Q	75.25	19.00	17.00	75.25	6
Sam van Lieshout	Girls' big air	15.75	61.75	61.75	12	Did not advance				
Sam van Lieshout	Girls' slopestyle	46.25	30.25	46.25	10 Q	71.25	41.25	14.75	71.25	7

Snowboard cross

Athlete	Event	Heats		Semifinal	Final
Athlete	Event	Points	Rank	Rank	Rank
Guusje de Booy	Girls' snowboardcross	16	5	Did not advance	

== Speed skating ==
Netherlands qualified four short track speed skaters (two per gender).

Boys

Athlete	Event	Race	
Athlete	Event	Time	Rank
Geophrey Coenraad	500 m	37.29	6
Geophrey Coenraad	1500 m	1.56,40	12
Sem Spruit	500 m	1.12.33	31
Sem Spruit	1500 m	1.54,94	4

Girls

Athlete	Event	Race	
Athlete	Event	Time	Rank
Angel Daleman	500 m	39.28	1st place, gold medalist(s)
Angel Daleman	1500 m	39.28	1st place, gold medalist(s)
Jasmijn Veenhuis	500 m	41.49	12
Jasmijn Veenhuis	1500 m	2.07,33	8

Mass Start

Athlete	Event	Semifinal			Final		
Athlete	Event	Points	Time	Rank	Points	Time	Rank
Geophrey Coenraad	Boys' mass start	10	5:31.272	3 Q	0	5:31.96	10
Sem Spruit	Boys' mass start	0	6:28.94	13 ADV	3	5:31.74	6
Angel Daleman	Girls' mass start	30	5:58.44	1 Q	33	5:54.22	1st place, gold medalist(s)
Jasmijn Veenhuis	Girls' mass start	30	6:23.54	1 Q	21	5:54.38	2nd place, silver medalist(s)

Mixed

Athletes	Event	Semifinal		Final	
Athletes	Event	Time	Rank	Time	Rank
Angel Daleman; Sem Spruit	Mixed relay	3:07.64	1 Q	3:12.10	3rd place, bronze medalist(s)

== See also ==
- Netherlands at the 2024 Summer Olympics
