= Speed skating at the 2024 Winter Youth Olympics =

Speed skating at the IV Winter Youth Olympic Games
- Venue: Gangneung Oval
- Dates: 22–26 January
- Competitors: 65 from 22 nations

Speed skating at the 2024 Winter Youth Olympics took place from 22 to 26 January 2024 at the Gangneung Oval, Gangneung, South Korea.

== Schedule ==
All times are in KST (UTC+9)

Date	Time	Event
22 January	11:00	Men's/Women's 500 metres
23 January	11:30	Men's/Women's 1500 metres
25 January	11:30	Mixed relay
26 January	11:30	Men's/Women's mass start

== Events ==
=== Medal table ===
* Host nation (South Korea)

Rank	Nation	Gold	Silver	Bronze	Total
1	Netherlands	3	1	1	5
2	Germany	3	0	0	3
3	China	1	3	1	5
4	South Korea*	0	2	1	3
5	Norway	0	1	1	2
6	Japan	0	0	2	2
7	Poland	0	0	1	1
Totals (7 entries)		7	7	7	21

=== Men's events ===
Event	Gold		Silver		Bronze	
500 metres	Finn Sonnekalb; Germany	36.61	Miika Johan Klevstuen; Norway	36.79	Shin Seo-nung; South Korea	37.13
1500 metres	Finn Sonnekalb; Germany	1:50.53	Pan Baoshuo; China	1:52.84	Sota Kubo; Japan	1:53.16
Mass start	Finn Sonnekalb; Germany	30 pts	Pan Baoshuo; China	22 pts	Eirik Andersen; Norway	10 pts

=== Women's events ===
Event	Gold		Silver		Bronze	
500 metres	Angel Daleman; Netherlands	39.28	Jung Hui-dan; South Korea	39.64	Waka Sasabuchi; Japan	39.65
1500 metres	Angel Daleman; Netherlands	2:02.90	Liu Yunqi; China	2:03.29	Hanna Mazur; Poland	2:05.13
Mass start	Angel Daleman; Netherlands	33 pts	Jasmijn Veenhuis; Netherlands	21 pts	Liu Yunqi; China	10 pts

=== Mixed events ===
Event	Gold		Silver		Bronze	
Mixed relay	China; Liu Yunqi; Pan Baoshuo	3:11.74	South Korea; Lim Lee-won; Heo Se-ok	3:11.78	Netherlands; Angel Daleman; Sem Spruit	3:12.10

== Qualification ==
=== Summary ===
The following NOCs received quotas:

NOC	Men's	Women's	Total
~~Australia~~	~~1~~ 0	0	0
Austria	~~2~~ 1	2	3
Belgium	~~2~~ 1	0	1
China	2	2	4
~~Chinese Taipei~~	~~1~~ 0	0	0
Colombia	0	2	2
~~Czech Republic~~	~~1~~ 0	~~1~~ 0	0
~~Denmark~~	0	~~1~~ 0	0
Estonia	~~0~~ 1	~~0~~ 1	2
Finland	1	0	1
Germany	2	2	4
Hungary	0	2	2
Italy	2	2	4
Japan	2	2	4
Kazakhstan	2	2	4
Latvia	~~0~~ 1	~~2~~ 0	1
Netherlands	2	2	4
Norway	2	2	4
Poland	2	2	4
Portugal	2	2	4
Romania	2	2	4
South Korea	2	2	4
Spain	2	2	4
Sweden	0	1	1
Switzerland	~~0~~ 1	0	1
United States	2	1	3
Total: 22 NOCs	32	33	65

=== Quota overview ===
Quota can be achieved via the 2023 World Junior Speed Skating Championships or via the rankings after 2 events of 2023–24 ISU Junior World Cup Speed Skating season.

Event	Quota(s)	NOCs	
Event	Quota(s)	Boys	Girls
Hosts	2	South Korea	South Korea
2023 World Junior Speed Skating Championships	2	Japan; Norway	Netherlands
2023 World Junior Speed Skating Championships	1	~~Canada~~; Netherlands; Poland; United States	Austria; Italy; Kazakhstan; Norway; United States
2023–24 ISU Junior World Cup Speed Skating rankings	2	~~Austria~~; ~~Belgium~~; China; Germany; ~~Hungary~~; Italy; Kazakhstan; Portugal; Romania; Spain	China; Colombia; Germany; Hungary; Japan; ~~Latvia~~; Poland; Portugal; Romania; Spain
2023–24 ISU Junior World Cup Speed Skating rankings	1	~~Australia~~; Austria; Belgium; ~~Chinese Taipei~~; ~~Czech Republic~~; Finland; Netherlands; Poland; United States	Austria; ~~Czech Republic~~; ~~Denmark~~; Italy; Kazakhstan; Norway; Sweden
Reallocation	1	Estonia; Latvia; Switzerland	Estonia
