= Speed skating at the 2024 Winter Youth Olympics – Women's 1500 metres =

Women's 1500 metres at the IV Winter Youth Olympic Games
- Venue: Gangneung Oval
- Date: 23 January
- Competitors: 33 from 18 nations
- Winning time: 2:02.90

Medalists
1st place, gold medalist(s)		Angel Daleman	Netherlands
2nd place, silver medalist(s)		Liu Yunqi	China
3rd place, bronze medalist(s)		Hanna Mazur	Poland

The women's 1500 metres speed skating competition of the 2024 Winter Youth Olympics was held at the Gangneung Oval on 23 January 2024.

== Results ==
The races were started at 11:30.

Rank	Pair	Lane	Name	Country	Time	Time Behind
1st place, gold medalist(s)	16	i	Angel Daleman	Netherlands	2:02.90	
2nd place, silver medalist(s)	15	o	Liu Yunqi	China	2:03.29	+0.39
3rd place, bronze medalist(s)	17	o	Hanna Mazur	Poland	2:05.13	+2.23
4	15	i	Kaede Kojima	Japan	2:05.71	+2.81
5	17	i	Jeannine Rosner	Austria	2:06.14	+3.24
6	16	o	Lim Lee-won	South Korea	2:06.28	+3.38
7	12	o	Kristina Shumekova	Kazakhstan	2:06.47	+3.57
8	13	o	Jasmijn Veenhuis	Netherlands	2:07.33	+4.43
9	10	i	Noemi Libralesso	Italy	2:08.51	+5.61
10	10	o	Zhang Shaohan	China	2:09.00	+6.10
11	9	i	Alina Shumekova	Kazakhstan	2:09.27	+6.37
12	12	i	Zofia Braun	Poland	2:09.90	+7.00
13	14	i	Jung Hui-dan	South Korea	2:10.60	+7.70
14	13	i	Marley Soldan	United States	2:11.85	+8.95
15	14	o	Paula Albrecht	Germany	2:12.13	+9.23
16	11	i	Martine Solem	Norway	2:12.28	+9.38
17	7	i	Ona Rodríguez Cornejo	Spain	2:13.04	+10.14
18	3	o	Giorgia Franceschini	Italy	2:13.860	+10.96
19	8	o	Francisca Henriques	Portugal	2:13.861	+10.96
20	2	o	Waka Sasabuchi	Japan	2:14.59	+11.69
21	7	o	Mia Meinig	Germany	2:15.89	+12.99
22	6	i	Lucía Alapont Martinez	Spain	2:16.54	+13.64
23	9	o	Isabella Vargas	Colombia	2:17.84	+14.94
24	8	i	Anne Sofie Knutsen Birkedal	Norway	2:18.59	+15.69
25	2	i	Isabella Caicedo	Colombia	2:19.42	+16.52
26	5	o	Iulia Ionescu	Romania	2:19.63	+16.73
27	4	i	Sarah Rosner	Austria	2:20.68	+17.78
28	6	o	Rebeka Vancsó	Hungary	2:22.06	+19.16
29	4	o	Lilla Enéh Sándor	Hungary	2:24.17	+21.27
30	5	i	Saskia Kütt	Estonia	2:25.30	+22.40
31	3	i	Teodora Pârvu	Romania	2:26.02	+23.12
32	1	i	Josephine Grill	Sweden	2:26.24	+23.34
33	11	o	Jéssica Rodrigues	Portugal	DNF	
