= Colombia at the 2024 Winter Youth Olympics =

- Flag of Colombia
- IOC code: COL
- NOC: Colombian Olympic Committee
- Website: www.olimpicocol.co (in Spanish)

in Gangwon, South Korea 19 January 2024 – 1 February 2024
- Competitors: 5 in 3 sports
- Flag bearers (opening): Tomás Palmezano & Isabella Caicedo
- Flag bearer (closing): TBD
- Medals: Gold 0 Silver 0 Bronze 0 Total 0

Winter Youth Olympics appearances (overview)
- 2016; 2020; 2024

Colombia is scheduled to compete at the 2024 Winter Youth Olympics in Gangwon, South Korea, from January 19 to February 1, 2024. This will be Colombia's third appearance at the Winter Youth Olympic Games, having competed at every Games since the second edition in 2016.

The Colombian team consisted of five athletes (two men and three women) competing in three sports. Skeleton athlete Tomás Palmezano and speed skater Isabella Caicedo were the country's flagbearers during the opening ceremony.

== Competitors ==
The following is the list of number of competitors (per gender) participating at the games per sport/discipline.

Sport	Men	Women	Total
Cross-country skiing	1	1	2
Skeleton	1	0	1
Speed skating	0	2	2
Total	2	3	5

== Cross-country skiing ==
Colombia qualified two cross-country skiers (one per gender).

Athlete	Event	Qualification		Quarterfinal		Semifinal		Final	
Athlete	Event	Time	Rank	Time	Rank	Time	Rank	Time	Rank
Samuel Jaramillo	Men's 7.5 km classical	—N/a						33:34.7	78
Samuel Jaramillo	Men's sprint freestyle	4:19.30	79	Did not advance					
Juliana Castaño	Women's 7.5 km classical	—N/a						38:54.2	73
Juliana Castaño	Women's sprint freestyle	5:00.89	73	Did not advance					

== Skeleton ==
Colombia qualified one male skeleton athlete.

Athlete	Event	Run 1		Run 2		Total	
Athlete	Event	Time	Rank	Time	Rank	Time	Rank
Tomás Palmezano	Men's	56.53	18	56.81	17	1:53.34	17

== Speed skating ==
Colombia qualified two women.

Women

Athlete	Event	Time	Rank
Isabella Caicedo	500 m	42.87	20
Isabella Caicedo	1500 m	2:19.42	25
Isabella Vargas	500 m	43.443	26
Isabella Vargas	1500 m	2:17.84	23

Mass Start

Athlete	Event	Semifinal			Final		
Athlete	Event	Points	Time	Rank	Points	Time	Rank
Isabella Caicedo	Women's mass start	1	6:28.08	9	Did not advance		
Isabella Vargas	Women's mass start	0	6:36.50	17	Did not advance		

== See also ==
- Colombia at the 2024 Summer Olympics
