= Speed skating at the 2024 Winter Youth Olympics – Women's 500 metres =

Women's 500 metres at the IV Winter Youth Olympic Games
- Venue: Gangneung Oval
- Date: 22 January
- Competitors: 33 from 18 nations
- Winning time: 39.28

Medalists
1st place, gold medalist(s)		Angel Daleman	Netherlands
2nd place, silver medalist(s)		Jung Hui-dan	South Korea
3rd place, bronze medalist(s)		Waka Sasabuchi	Japan

The women's 500 metres speed skating competition of the 2024 Winter Youth Olympics was held at the Gangneung Oval on 22 January 2024.

== Results ==
The races were started at 11:00.

Rank	Pair	Lane	Name	Country	Time	Time Behind
1st place, gold medalist(s)	17	i	Angel Daleman	Netherlands	39.28	
2nd place, silver medalist(s)	15	o	Jung Hui-dan	South Korea	39.64	+0.36
3rd place, bronze medalist(s)	17	o	Waka Sasabuchi	Japan	39.65	+0.37
4	13	o	Liu Yunqi	China	40.10	+0.82
5	16	o	Zhang Shaohan	China	40.35	+1.07
6	16	i	Hanna Mazur	Poland	40.66	+1.38
7	12	i	Kristina Shumekova	Kazakhstan	40.89	+1.61
8	8	o	Lim Lee-won	South Korea	41.03	+1.75
9	13	i	Kaede Kojima	Japan	41.06	+1.78
10	10	i	Alina Shumekova	Kazakhstan	41.193	+1.91
11	14	o	Ona Rodríguez Cornejo	Spain	41.195	+1.91
12	12	o	Jasmijn Veenhuis	Netherlands	41.49	+2.21
13	11	o	Zofia Braun	Poland	41.76	+2.48
14	11	i	Martine Solem	Norway	41.93	+2.65
15	9	i	Jéssica Rodrigues	Portugal	41.96	+2.68
16	14	i	Paula Albrecht	Germany	42.07	+2.79
17	10	o	Francisca Henriques	Portugal	42.35	+3.07
18	8	i	Anne Sofie Knutsen Birkedal	Norway	42.60	+3.32
19	9	o	Rebeka Vancsó	Hungary	42.66	+3.38
20	3	o	Isabella Caicedo	Colombia	42.87	+3.59
21	4	i	Noemi Libralesso	Italy	43.09	+3.81
22	7	o	Marley Soldan	United States	43.26	+3.98
23	2	i	Giorgia Franceschini	Italy	43.29	+4.01
24	1	i	Lucía Alapont Martinez	Spain	43.31	+4.03
25	3	i	Sarah Rosner	Austria	43.442	+4.16
26	7	i	Isabella Vargas	Colombia	43.443	+4.16
27	6	o	Mia Meinig	Germany	43.52	+4.24
28	2	o	Saskia Kütt	Estonia	43.86	+4.58
29	6	i	Lilla Enéh Sándor	Hungary	44.29	+5.01
30	4	o	Teodora Pârvu	Romania	45.26	+5.98
31	5	i	Iulia Ionescu	Romania	45.47	+6.19
32	5	o	Josephine Grill	Sweden	45.84	+6.56
33	15	i	Jeannine Rosner	Austria	DNF	
