= 2014 UCI Mountain Bike & Trials World Championships – Women's junior cross-country =

== Results ==
#	Cyclist	Nation		Time
1	Nicole Koller	Switzerland	in	1 h 06 min 16 s
2	Malene Degn	Denmark	+	1 min 06 s
3	Sina Frei	Switzerland		1 min 27 s
4	Alessandra Keller	Switzerland		1 min 49 s
5	Barbora Prudkova	Czech Republic		2 min 10 s
6	Evie Richards	Great Britain		3 min 00 s
7	Isla Short	Great Britain		4 min 51 s
8	Chiara Teocchi	Italy		5 min 51 s
9	Marlena Drozdziok	Poland		5 min 52 s
10	Greta Seiwald	Italy		6 min 13 s
11	Antonia Daubermann	Germany		6 min 39 s
12	Marine Lewis	Canada		7 min 05 s
13	Ffion James	Great Britain		7 min 26 s
14	Tatiana Kuznetcova	Russia		7 min 31 s
15	Marit Sveen	Norway		8 min 04 s
16	Jana Czeczinkarova	Czech Republic		9 min 02 s
17	Aline Seitz	Switzerland		9 min 16 s
18	Laure Souty	France		10 min 14 s
19	Nadja Heigl	Austria		10 min 39 s
20	Marlo Koevoet	Netherlands		11 min 03 s
21	Harriet Beaven	New Zealand		12 min 12 s
22	Cléa Cochelin	France		12 min 48 s
23	Anna Gabrielsen	Norway		12 min 57 s
24	Marina Semenova	Russia		13 min 07 s
25	Lisa Neumuller	Germany		13 min 32 s
26	Frances Du Toit	South Africa		13 min 38 s
27	Ksenia Lepikhina	United States		14 min 33 s
28	Soren Meeuwisse	Canada		15 min 28 s
29	Laurie Arseneault	Canada		17 min 00 s
30	Meda Petrusauskaite	Lithuania		18 min 40 s
31	Shea Chavez	United States		22 min 09 s
32	Patrycja Piotrowska	Poland		1 tour
33	Ana Sofia Silvestre	Portugal		1 tour
34	Megan Williams	Australia		1 tour
35	Brenda Santoyo	Mexico		1 tour
36	Paige Foxcroft	Canada		1 tour
37	Dayana Garcia	Mexico		1 tour
	Bianca Haw	South Africa		abandon
	Ellie Wale	Australia		abandon
	Sarah Bauer	Germany		did not start
