= Portugal at the 2024 Winter Youth Olympics =

- Flag of Portugal
- IOC code: POR
- NOC: Portuguese Olympic Committee

in Gangwon, South Korea 19 January 2024 – 1 February 2024
- Competitors: 6 in 2 sports
- Flag bearers (opening): Emeric Guerillot & Jéssica Rodrigues
- Flag bearer (closing): TBD
- Medals: Gold 0 Silver 0 Bronze 0 Total 0

Winter Youth Olympics appearances
- 2012; 2016; 2020; 2024

Portugal is scheduled to compete at the 2024 Winter Youth Olympics in Gangwon, South Korea, from January 19 to February 1, 2024, This will be Portugal's third appearance at the Winter Youth Olympic Games, having competed at every Games since the second edition in 2016.

The Portuguese delegation consisted of six athletes (three per gender) competing in two sports. Alpine skier Emeric Guerillot and speed skater Jéssica Rodrigues were the country's flagbearers during the opening ceremony.

== Competitors ==
The following is the list of number of competitors (per gender) participating at the games per sport/discipline.

Sport	Men	Women	Total
Alpine skiing	1	1	2
Speed skating	2	2	4
Total	3	3	6

== Alpine skiing ==
Portugal qualified two alpine skiers (one per gender).

Men

Athlete	Event	Run 1		Run 2		Total	
Athlete	Event	Time	Rank	Time	Rank	Time	Rank
Emeric Guerrillot	Super-G	—N/a				56.79	32
Emeric Guerrillot	Giant slalom	52.75	39	Did not finish			
Emeric Guerrillot	Slalom	50.69	36	56.39	21	1:47.08	21
Emeric Guerrillot	Combined	57.80	37	58.80	26	1:56.60	26

Women

Athlete	Event	Run 1		Run 2		Total	
Athlete	Event	Time	Rank	Time	Rank	Time	Rank
Nahia Vieira da Fonte	Super-G	—N/a				1:02.30	48
Nahia Vieira da Fonte	Giant slalom	59.15	42	Did not finish			
Nahia Vieira da Fonte	Slalom	1:00.73	48	Did not finish			
Nahia Vieira da Fonte	Combined	1:03.22	47	1:02.29	32	2:05.51	31

== Speed skating ==
Portugal qualified four speed skaters (two per gender).

Men

Athlete	Event	Time	Rank
Manuel Piteira	500 m	40.78	26
Manuel Piteira	1500 m	2:06.36	25
Martim Vieira	500 m	38.84	16
Martim Vieira	1500 m	2:09.50	29

Women

Athlete	Event	Time	Rank
Francisca Henriques	500 m	42.35	17
Francisca Henriques	1500 m	2:13.861	19
Jéssica Rodrigues	500 m	41.96	15
Jéssica Rodrigues	1500 m	Did not finish	

Mass Start

Athlete	Event	Semifinal			Final		
Athlete	Event	Points	Time	Rank	Points	Time	Rank
Manuel Piteira	Men's mass start	0	5:36.62	11	Did not advance		
Martim Vieira	Men's mass start	0	6:25.82	12	Did not advance		
Jéssica Rodrigues	Women's mass start	20	5:59.13	2 Q	3	5:56.48	6
Francisca Henriques	Women's mass start	0	6:26.04	10	Did not advance		

Mixed relay

Athlete	Event	Semifinal		Final	
Athlete	Event	Time	Rank	Time	Rank
Martim Vieira; Francisca Henriques	Mixed relay	Disqualified		Did not advance	

== See also ==
- Portugal at the 2024 Summer Olympics
