= Speed skating at the 2024 Winter Youth Olympics – Women's mass start =

Women's mass start at the IV Winter Youth Olympic Games
- Venue: Gangneung Oval
- Date: 26 January
- Competitors: 33 from 18 nations
- Winning points: 33

Medalists
| 1st place, gold medalist(s) | | Angel Daleman | Netherlands |
| 2nd place, silver medalist(s) | | Jasmijn Veenhuis | Netherlands |
| 3rd place, bronze medalist(s) | | Liu Yunqi | China |

The women's mass start speed skating competition of the 2024 Winter Youth Olympics was held at the Gangneung Oval on 26 January 2024.

== Results ==
=== Semifinals ===
The semifinals were started at 11:30.

| Rank | Heat | Name | Country | Laps | Points | | | | Time | Notes |
| Rank | Heat | Name | Country | Laps | S1 | S2 | S3 | Total | Time | Notes |
|---|---|---|---|---|---|---|---|---|---|---|
| 1 | 1 | Angel Daleman | Netherlands | 10 | | | 30 | 30 | 5:58.44 | Q |
| 2 | 1 | Jéssica Rodrigues | Portugal | 10 | | | 20 | 20 | 5:59.13 | Q |
| 3 | 1 | Kaede Kojima | Japan | 10 | | | 10 | 10 | 5:59.16 | Q |
| 4 | 1 | Zhang Shaohan | China | 10 | | | 4 | 4 | 5:59.21 | Q |
| 5 | 1 | Alina Shumekova | Kazakhstan | 10 | 3 | | | 3 | 5:59.81 | Q |
| 6 | 1 | Jeannine Rosner | Austria | 10 | 1 | 2 | | 3 | 6:00.56 | Q |
| 7 | 1 | Noemi Libralesso | Italy | 10 | | 3 | | 3 | 6:02.53 | Q |
| 8 | 1 | Zofia Braun | Poland | 10 | 2 | 1 | | 3 | 6:31.80 | Q |
| 9 | 1 | Ona Rodríguez Cornejo | Spain | 10 | | | 2 | 2 | 5:59.23 | |
| 10 | 1 | Jung Hui-dan | South Korea | 10 | | | 1 | 1 | 5:59.24 | |
| 11 | 1 | Anne Sofie Knutsen Birkedal | Norway | 10 | | | | 0 | 6:02.03 | |
| 12 | 1 | Mia Meinig | Germany | 10 | | | | 0 | 6:02.23 | |
| 13 | 1 | Josephine Grill | Sweden | 10 | | | | 0 | 6:02.68 | |
| 14 | 1 | Rebeka Vancsó | Hungary | 10 | | | | 0 | 6:09.70 | |
| 15 | 1 | Saskia Kütt | Estonia | 10 | | | | 0 | 6:12.33 | |
| 16 | 1 | Iulia Ionescu | Romania | 10 | | | | 0 | 6:18.71 | |
| 17 | 1 | Isabella Vargas | Colombia | 10 | | | | 0 | 6:36.50 | |
| 1 | 2 | Jasmijn Veenhuis | Netherlands | 10 | | | 30 | 30 | 6:23.54 | Q |
| 2 | 2 | Liu Yunqi | China | 10 | | | 20 | 20 | 6:23.63 | Q |
| 3 | 2 | Martine Solem | Norway | 10 | | | 10 | 10 | 6:23.64 | Q |
| 4 | 2 | Giorgia Franceschini | Italy | 10 | | | 4 | 4 | 6:25.86 | Q |
| 5 | 2 | Waka Sasabuchi | Japan | 10 | 2 | | 2 | 4 | 6:25.910 | Q |
| 6 | 2 | Marley Soldan | United States | 10 | | 3 | 1 | 4 | 6:25.912 | Q |
| 7 | 2 | Kristina Shumekova | Kazakhstan | 10 | 1 | 2 | | 3 | 6:26.07 | Q |
| 8 | 2 | Hanna Mazur | Poland | 10 | 3 | | | 3 | 6:27.52 | Q |
| 9 | 2 | Isabella Caicedo | Colombia | 10 | | 1 | | 1 | 6:28.08 | |
| 10 | 2 | Francisca Henriques | Portugal | 10 | | | | 0 | 6:26.04 | |
| 11 | 2 | Lilla Enéh Sándor | Hungary | 10 | | | | 0 | 6:28.29 | |
| 12 | 2 | Teodora Pârvu | Romania | 10 | | | | 0 | 6:28.38 | |
| 13 | 2 | Lucía Alapont Martinez | Spain | 10 | | | | 0 | 6:28.42 | |
| 14 | 2 | Paula Albrecht | Germany | 10 | | | | 0 | 6:28.86 | |
| 15 | 2 | Sarah Rosner | Austria | 10 | | | | 0 | 6:30.48 | |
| 16 | 2 | Lim Lee-won | South Korea | 10 | | | | 0 | 7:13.01 | |

=== Final ===
The final was started at 12:52.

| Rank | Name | Country | Laps | Points | | | | Time | Notes |
| Rank | Name | Country | Laps | S1 | S2 | S3 | Total | Time | Notes |
|---|---|---|---|---|---|---|---|---|---|
| 1 | Angel Daleman | Netherlands | 10 | 1 | 2 | 30 | 33 | 5:54.22 | |
| 2 | Jasmijn Veenhuis | Netherlands | 10 | | 1 | 20 | 21 | 5:54.38 | |
| 3 | Liu Yunqi | China | 10 | | | 10 | 10 | 5:54.49 | |
| 4 | Zofia Braun | Poland | 10 | | 3 | 2 | 5 | 5:55.20 | |
| 5 | Zhang Shaohan | China | 10 | | | 4 | 4 | 5:54.99 | |
| 6 | Jéssica Rodrigues | Portugal | 10 | 3 | | | 3 | 5:56.48 | |
| 7 | Marley Soldan | United States | 10 | 2 | | | 2 | 5:58.07 | |
| 8 | Jeannine Rosner | Austria | 10 | | | 1 | 1 | 5:55.82 | |
| 9 | Noemi Libralesso | Italy | 10 | | | | 0 | 5:55.84 | |
| 10 | Waka Sasabuchi | Japan | 10 | | | | 0 | 5:56.41 | |
| 11 | Kaede Kojima | Japan | 10 | | | | 0 | 5:56.43 | |
| 12 | Kristina Shumekova | Kazakhstan | 10 | | | | 0 | 5:58.38 | |
| 13 | Martine Solem | Norway | 10 | | | | 0 | 5:59.56 | |
| 14 | Giorgia Franceschini | Italy | 10 | | | | 0 | 6:01.79 | |
| 15 | Hanna Mazur | Poland | 10 | | | | 0 | 7:02.81 | |
| 16 | Alina Shumekova | Kazakhstan | | | | | DQ | | |
