= Jhonnatan Botero Villegas =

Colombian mountain bike racer

Jhonnatan Botero
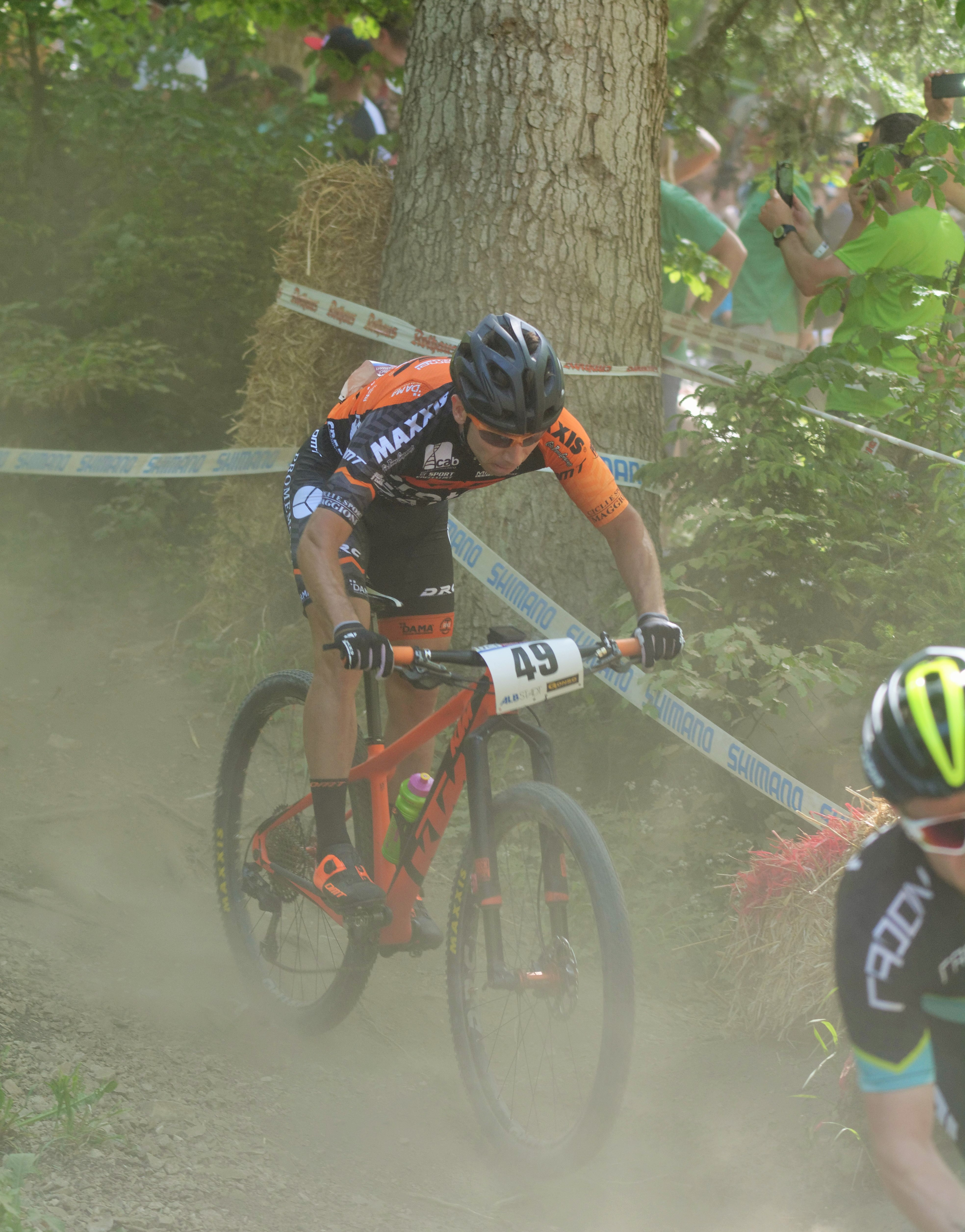
- Botero at the 2017 UCI Mountain Bike World Cup in Albstadt

Personal information
- Nationality: Colombian
- Born: 27 April 1992 (age 34) Retiro, Antioquia, Colombia
- Height: 167 cm (5 ft 6 in)
- Weight: 57 kg (126 lb)

Sport
- Country: Colombia
- Sport: Mountain bike racing
- Events: cross-country; marathon
- Coached by: Héctor Pérez
Medal record
Representing Colombia
Event	1st	2nd	3rd
Youth Olympic Games	1	0	0
Pan American Championships	4	2	1
CAC Games	1	1	0
Bolivarian Games	0	0	1
Pan American Junior Championships	1	0	0
Total	7	3	2
Men's mountain bike racing
Pan American Championships
Gold medal – first place	2010 Guatemala City	Mixed relay
Gold medal – first place	2013 San Miguel de Tucumán	Under-23 cross-country
Gold medal – first place	2014 Londrina	Under-23 cross-country
Gold medal – first place	2018 Pereira	Mixed relay
Silver medal – second place	2021 Salinas	Cross-country
Bronze medal – third place	2026 San Juan del Paraná	Mixed relay
Central American and Caribbean Games
Gold medal – first place	2023 San Salvador	Cross-country
Silver medal – second place	2018 Barranquilla	Cross-country
Bolivarian Games
Bronze medal – third place	2017 Santa Marta	Cross-country
Youth Olympic Games
Gold medal – first place	2010 Singapore	Mixed team
Pan American Junior Championships
Gold medal – first place	2010 Guatemala City	Cross-country
Men's mountain bike marathon
Pan American Championships
Silver medal – second place	2023 Santa Rosa de Cabal	Marathon

Jhonnatan Botero Villegas (born 27 April 1992) is a Colombian mountain bike racer. Among his most important achievements are the team gold medal obtained at the 2010 Summer Youth Olympics and the fifth place in mountain biking at the 2016 Summer Olympics.

== Sports career ==
=== Beginnings ===
His passion for cycling started at a young age. Botero always went to school by bicycle, in the Antioquia municipality of El Retiro, the town where he was born. Also, when he entered college, he never stopped training before going to class, so he was always in contact with a bicycle.

His beginnings in mountain biking are due in part to his uncle, John Jairo Botero, who, living in Italy, was passionate about this sport.

With the support of his coach, Héctor Pérez, he launched his career towards the Singapore Youth Olympic Games in 2010.

=== Participation in competitions ===
Jhonnatan Botero's sports career is identified by his participation in the following national and international events:

==== Youth Olympic Games ====
He was recognized for his triumph for being Colombia's second gold medalist at the Youth Olympic Games for the Colombian national team at the 2010 Singapore games.

His participation in the first edition of the games was notable for being the second athlete with a gold medal among all the Colombian participants of the event, by obtaining victory over the Italian mountain biking team on August 17.

==== 2016 Rio de Janeiro Olympics ====
Botero had a great participation in the Mountain Biking of the Olympic Games in Rio de Janeiro, where he took fifth place and gave Colombia its twenty-second Olympic diploma in this sporting competition.

==== MTB Pan American Championship, Colombia ====
During this event, held in 2018, Botero won the gold medal in the team relay event, along with the participation of his teammates Valentina Abril and Leydy Mera.

This competition was held in the city of Pereira, Risaralda, where the second place was occupied by the Costa Rican team and the third by Mexico.

==== MTB Pan American Championship, Puerto Rico ====
In 2021, Botero participated in the Pan American Mountain Biking (MTB) Championship, held in Salinas (Puerto Rico), obtaining second place, behind Mexican Gerardo Ulloa.

== Honors ==
=== Olympic Games ===
- Rio de Janeiro 2016
  - 5th in Cross-country cycling

=== Pan American Championships ===
- Guatemala 2010
  - Gold in mixed relay
  - Gold in Cross-country cycling Junior
- San Miguel de Tucumán 2013
  - Gold in Cross-country cycling U23
- Londrina 2014
  - Gold in Cross-country cycling U23
- Pereira 2018
  - Gold in mixed relay (with Laura Valentina Abril and Leidy Mera)
- Salinas 2021
  - Silver in Cross-country cycling

=== Central American and Caribbean Games ===
- Barranquilla/Cali 2018
  - Silver in Cross-country cycling

=== Youth Olympic Games ===
- Singapur 2010
  - Team gold in Cross-country cycling (with Jessica Legarda, Brayan Ramírez and David Oquendo)

=== Bolivarian Games ===
- Santa Marta 2017
  - Bronze in Cross-country cycling

=== Championships in Colombia ===
- 2014
  - Gold in Cross-country cycling
- 2015
  - Gold in Cross-country cycling
- 2016
  - Gold in Cross-country cycling
- 2018
  - Silver in Cross-country cycling
- 2019
  - Silver in Cross-country cycling
- 2022
  - Bronze in Cross-country cycling

== See also ==
- Cycling at the 2010 Summer Youth Olympics
- Colombia at the 2010 Summer Youth Olympics
- Colombia at the Youth Olympics
- 2010 Summer Youth Olympics
