= Speed skating at the 2024 Winter Youth Olympics – Mixed relay =

Mixed relay at the IV Winter Youth Olympic Games
- Venue: Gangneung Oval
- Date: 25 January
- Competitors: 24 from 12 nations
- Winning time: 3:11.74

Medalists
1st place, gold medalist(s)		Pan Baoshuo; Liu Yunqi	China
2nd place, silver medalist(s)		Heo Se-ok; Lim Lee-won	South Korea
3rd place, bronze medalist(s)		Sem Spruit; Angel Daleman	Netherlands

The mixed relay speed skating competition of the 2024 Winter Youth Olympics was held at the Gangneung Oval on 25 January 2024.

== Results ==
=== Semifinals ===
The semifinals were started at 11:30.

Rank	Heat	Name	Country	Time	Time Behind
1	1	Sem Spruit; Angel Daleman	Netherlands	3:07.64	
2	2	Heo Se-ok; Lim Lee-won	South Korea	3:07.84	+0.20
3	3	Pan Baoshuo; Liu Yunqi	China	3:08.31	+0.67
4	3	Sota Kubo; Kaede Kojima	Japan	3:09.73	+2.09
5	3	Lorenzo Minari; Noemi Libralesso	Italy	3:09.81	+2.17
6	1	Miika Johan Klevstuen; Martine Solem	Norway	3:12.19	+4.55
7	1	Sergio Álvarez Fernandez; Ona Rodríguez Cornejo	Spain	3:12.24	+4.60
8	2	Max Weber; Marley Soldan	United States	3:13.80	+6.16
9	2	Szymon Hostyński; Hanna Mazur	Poland	3:23.02	+15.38
10	1	Finn Sonnekalb; Paula Albrecht	Germany	DQ (Note: Disqualified for not wearing timekeeping equipment)	
11	2	Ruslan Zhanadilov; Kristina Shumekova	Kazakhstan	DQ (Note: Disqualified for not relaying in the exchange zone)	
12	3	Martim Vieira; Francisca Henriques	Portugal	DQ (Note: Disqualified for not relaying in the exchange zone)	

=== Final ===
The final was started at 12:28.

Rank	Name	Country	Time	Time Behind
1st place, gold medalist(s)	Pan Baoshuo; Liu Yunqi	China	3:11.74	
2nd place, silver medalist(s)	Heo Se-ok; Lim Lee-won	South Korea	3:11.78	+0.04
3rd place, bronze medalist(s)	Sem Spruit; Angel Daleman	Netherlands	3:12.10	+0.36
4	Sota Kubo; Kaede Kojima	Japan	3:15.61	+3.87
