= Colombia at the 2020 Winter Youth Olympics =

- IOC code: COL
- NOC: Colombian Olympic Committee
- Website: www.olimpicocol.co (in Spanish)

in Lausanne, Switzerland January 10–22
- Competitors: 2 in 2 sports
- Medals Ranked 27th: Gold 0 Silver 1 Bronze 0 Total 1

Winter Youth Olympics appearances (overview)
- 2016; 2020; 2024

Colombia competed at the 2020 Winter Youth Olympics in Lausanne, Switzerland from 10 to 22 January 2020. They competed with 2 athletes in 2 sports.

Diego Amaya won the silver medal in the boys' mass start speed skating. This was the first time in history that an athlete from a tropical nation and a Latin American won a medal at an Olympic winter event.

== Medalists ==
Medals awarded to participants of mixed-NOC teams are represented in italics. These medals are not counted towards the individual NOC medal tally.

Medal	Name	Sport	Event	Date
Silver	Diego Amaya	Speed skating	Boys' mass start	16 January

== Bobsleigh ==
Athlete	Event	Run 1		Run 2		Total	
Athlete	Event	Time	Rank	Time	Rank	Time	Rank
Maude Crossland	Girls'	1:15.89	14	1:16.26	16	2:32.15	15

== Speed skating ==
Colombia qualified one male speed skater.

Boys

Athlete	Event	Time	Rank
Diego Amaya	500 m	37.05	4
Diego Amaya	1500 m	1:55.80	4

Mass Start

Athlete	Event	Semifinal			Final		
Athlete	Event	Points	Time	Rank	Points	Time	Rank
Diego Amaya	Boys' mass start	4	5:55.21	6 Q	20	6:30.33	2nd place, silver medalist(s)

Mixed

Athlete	Event	Time	Rank
Team 13; Karyna Shypulia (BLR); Alina Dauranova (KAZ); Xue Zhiwen (CHN); Diego Amaya (COL)	Mixed team sprint	Disqualified	

== See also ==
- Colombia at the 2020 Summer Olympics
