= Michael Poettoz =

Colombian alpine skier (born 1998)

Sport
- Sport: Skiing

Michael Poettoz (born August 21, 1998) is an alpine skier representing Colombia. Poettoz was born in Cali and was adopted by a French family when he was aged 21 months. Poettoz grew up and learned how to ski in Les Carroz d'Araches, France.

== Career ==
=== 2016 ===
Poettoz became the first Colombian to compete in the Winter Youth Olympics in Lillehammer, Norway. In the slalom event, Poettoz did not finish the first run. In the giant slalom, Poettoz finished 35th in the first run with a time of 1:24.70. Poettoz, however, did not finish the second run.

=== 2017 ===
In 2017, Poettoz became the first ever person to be born in Colombia to qualify for the Winter Olympics.

=== 2022 ===
Poettoz competed for Colombia at the 2022 Winter Olympics.

== See also ==
- Colombia at the 2016 Winter Youth Olympics
- Colombia at the 2018 Winter Olympics
- Cynthia Denzler - First Colombian to compete at the Winter Olympics, in 2010
