= Colombia at the 2016 Winter Youth Olympics =

- IOC code: COL
- NOC: Colombian Olympic Committee
- Website: www.olimpicocol.co (in Spanish)

in Lillehammer
- Competitors: 1 in 1 sport
- Medals: Gold 0 Silver 0 Bronze 0 Total 0

Winter Youth Olympics appearances (overview)
- 2016; 2020; 2024

Colombia competed at the 2016 Winter Youth Olympics in Lillehammer, Norway from 12 to 21 February 2016. The country made its debut at the Winter Youth Olympics.

== Alpine skiing ==
Colombia qualified a one boy athlete.

Boys

Athlete	Event	Run 1		Run 2		Total	
Athlete	Event	Time	Rank	Time	Rank	Time	Rank
Michael Poettoz	Slalom	DNF		did not advance			
Michael Poettoz	Giant slalom	1:24.70	35	did not finish			

== See also ==
- Colombia at the 2016 Summer Olympics
