= Barbora Průdková =

Czech cyclist

Personal information
- Born: 1 February 1996 (age 30)

Cycling career
- Sport: Cycling
- Disciplines: Road; Mountain biking; Cyclo-cross
- Role: Rider

Professional teams
- 2018: Head Pro Team (MTB)
- 2018: Team Dukla Praha (road)

Barbora Průdková (born 1 February 1996) is a Czech professional racing cyclist. She rode in the women's road race at the 2016 UCI Road World Championships, finishing in 25th place.

== Major results ==
2013
1st Cross-country, National Junior Mountain Bike Championships
2014
Summer Youth Olympics

1st Mixed team relay
2nd Girls' team

1st Cross-country, National Junior Mountain Bike Championships
2nd Road race, National Junior Road Championships
5th Junior cross-country, UCI Mountain Bike & Trials World Championships
7th Cross-country, UEC European Junior Mountain Bike Championships
2015
National Mountain Bike Championships

2nd Cross-country marathon
2nd Cross-country
3rd Cross-country eliminator

3rd Road race, National Road Championships
2016
2nd Road race, National Road Championships
5th Cross-country eliminator, UCI Mountain Bike & Trials World Championships
UEC European Mountain Bike Championships

6th Cross-country eliminator
9th Under-23 cross-country

2017
National Mountain Bike Championships

1st Cross-country eliminator
3rd Under-23 cross-country

2nd Cross-country eliminator, UEC European Mountain Bike Championships
4th Cross-country, UCI Under-23 Mountain Bike World Championships
2018
3rd Cross-country eliminator, UEC European Mountain Bike Championships
3rd Cross-country, National Under-23 Mountain Bike Championships
2019
1st Cross-country eliminator, National Mountain Bike Championships
4th World Eliminator Championships
4th Cross-country eliminator, UEC European Mountain Bike Championships
2020
2nd E-MTB Endurance, National Mountain Bike Championships
2021
1st Downhill, National Mountain Bike Championships
8th World Eliminator Championships
