= Angel Daleman =

Dutch speed skater (born 2007)

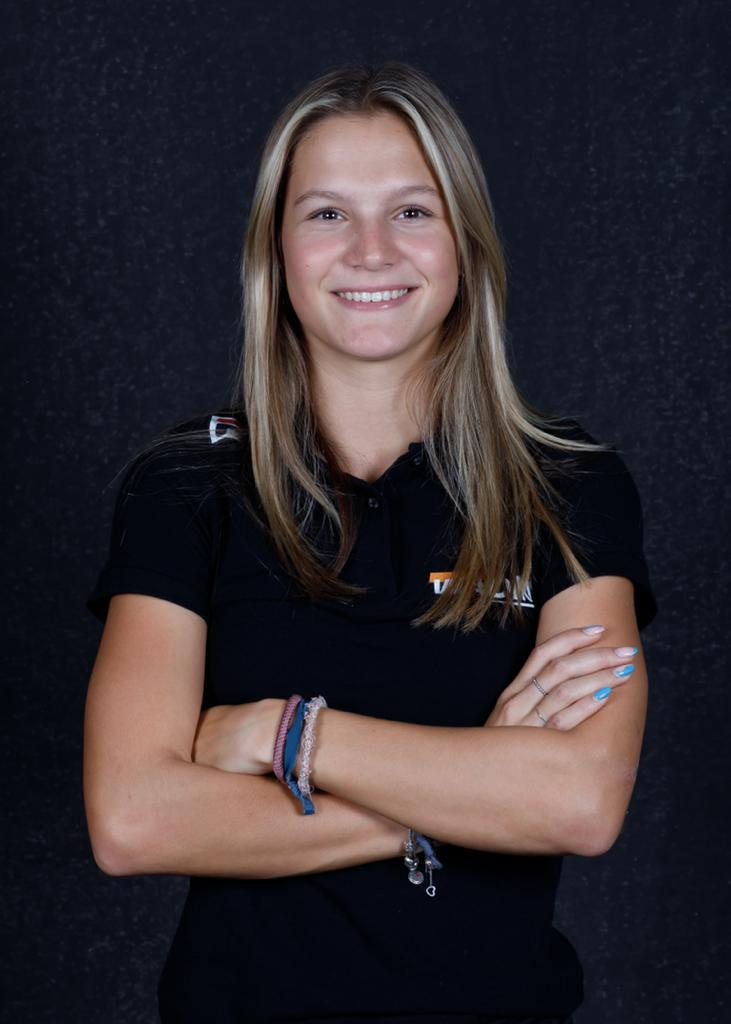
- Daleman in 2022

Personal information
- Nationality: Dutch
- Born: 25 March 2007 (age 19) Netherlands
- Height: 1.72 m (5 ft 8 in)

Sport
- Country: Netherlands
- Sport: Speed skating
- Events: 500 m, 1000 m, 1500 m
- Club: Team Essent
- Turned pro: 2024
Medal record
Women's speed skating
Representing the Netherlands
World Single Distances Championships
Gold medal – first place	2025 Hamar	Team sprint
Winter Youth Olympics
Gold medal – first place	2024 Gangwon	500 m
Gold medal – first place	2024 Gangwon	1500 m
Gold medal – first place	2024 Gangwon	Mass start
Bronze medal – third place	2024 Gangwon	Mixed relay
World Junior Championships
Gold medal – first place	2023 Inzell	1000 m
Gold medal – first place	2023 Inzell	1500 m
Gold medal – first place	2023 Inzell	Team sprint
Gold medal – first place	2023 Inzell	Team pursuit
Gold medal – first place	2023 Inzell	Mass start
Gold medal – first place	2023 Inzell	Overall
Gold medal – first place	2024 Hachinohe	500 m
Gold medal – first place	2024 Hachinohe	1000 m
Gold medal – first place	2024 Hachinohe	1500 m
Gold medal – first place	2024 Hachinohe	Team sprint
Gold medal – first place	2024 Hachinohe	Overall
Silver medal – second place	2023 Inzell	500 m
Silver medal – second place	2024 Hachinohe	Team pursuit
Bronze medal – third place	2023 Inzell	3000 m

Angel Mila Diana Daleman (born 25 March 2007) is a Dutch speed skater, who competes in both short track speed skating and long track speed skating.

== Career ==
=== Short track ===
At the 2022 World Junior Short Track Speed Skating Championships held in Gdańsk, Poland, in March 2022 Daleman won silver medals at the 1500 m and the 3000 m relay.

=== Long track ===
In February 2023 Daleman became the junior world speed skating champion in Inzell, Germany. At 15 years and 327 days she was the youngest junior world champion ever.

At the 2024 Winter Youth Olympics held in Gangwon Province, South Korea, between 19 January and 1 February 2024, Daleman won the gold medal at all three women's speed skating events; 500 m, 1500 m and mass start, as well as a bronze medal in the mixed relay. In February 2024 she became the junior world speed skating champion in Hachinohe, Japan, winning five of the seven events.

Daleman joined Team Essent's speed skating squad for the 2024–25 season. In November 2024, she made her debut at the ISU Speed Skating World Cup in Nagano, Japan. At the second World Cup event in Beijing, China she won a bronze medal at the 1000 m and 1500 m events, setting a new personal best at both distances, and won the team sprint event partnering Michelle de Jong and Suzanne Schulting.

In April 2025, Daleman officially joined Team Essent on a two-year contract. In March 2026, she extended her contract with the team until the 2027–28 season.

In November 2026, Daleman secured her first ISU World Cup victories. At the first World Cup event of the 2026–27 season in Beijing, China she won the gold in both 500 m events and the 1000 m event. This makes her the first person to beat fellow Dutch speed skater Femke Kok on a 500 m, who had been dominant for over 2 and a half years (or 1.014 days). A week later, Daleman also secured the gold medal on the 1000 m in Obihiro, Japan, more than a second ahead of the second place, fellow Dutch speed skater Isabel Grevelt.

== Records ==
=== Personal records ===
Personal records
Speed skating
Event	Result	Date	Location	Notes
500 m	37.26	23 October, 2026	Thialf, Heerenveen	
1000 m	1:13.49	1 November 2026	Thialf, Heerenveen	
1500 m	1:52.38	25 January 2025	Olympic Oval, Calgary	Junior World Record
3000 m	4:11.75	11 February 2023	Max Aicher Arena, Inzell	
