= Speed skating at the 2020 Winter Youth Olympics – Boys' mass start =

Boys' mass start at the III Winter Youth Olympic Games
- Venue: Lake St. Moritz
- Date: 16 January
- Competitors: 32 from 19 nations
- Winning points: 30

Medalists
| 1st place, gold medalist(s) | | Motonaga Arito | Japan |
| 2nd place, silver medalist(s) | | Diego Amaya | Colombia |
| 3rd place, bronze medalist(s) | | Pavel Taran | Russia |

The boys' mass start speed skating competition of the 2020 Winter Youth Olympics was held at Lake St. Moritz on 16 January 2020.

== Results ==
=== Semifinals ===
The first semifinal was held at 11:30, the second at 11:40.

==== Semifinal 1 ====
| Rank | Name | Country | Points | Time | Notes |
|---|---|---|---|---|---|
| 1 | Motonaga Arito | Japan | 31 | 5:53.77 | Q |
| 2 | Sun Jiazhao | China | 22 | 5:54.02 | Q |
| 3 | Alexander Sergeev | Russia | 10 | 5:54.08 | Q |
| 4 | Remo Slotegraaf | Netherlands | 5 | 5:55.13 | Q |
| 5 | Oddbjørn Mellemstrand | Norway | 4 | 5:54.34 | Q |
| 6 | Diego Amaya | Colombia | 4 | 5:55.21 | Q |
| 7 | Nil Llop | Spain | 2 | 5:55.84 | Q |
| 8 | Max Fiodarav | Belarus | 1 | 6:25.95 | Q |
| 9 | Eetu Käsnänen | Finland | 0 | 5:55.67 | |
| 10 | Lukáš Steklý | Czech Republic | 0 | 5:55.71 | |
| 11 | Filip Hawrylak | Poland | 0 | 5:55.89 | |
| 12 | Manuel Zähringer | Germany | 0 | 5:57.11 | |
| 13 | Theo Collins | Great Britain | 0 | 5:58.38 | |
| 14 | Yang Suk-hoon | South Korea | 0 | 6:09.73 | |
| 15 | Yevgeniy Koshkin | Kazakhstan | 0 | 6:09.83 | |
| 16 | Jordan Stolz | United States | | DNF | |

==== Semifinal 2 ====
| Rank | Name | Country | Points | Time | Notes |
|---|---|---|---|---|---|
| 1 | Flavio Gross | Switzerland | 30 | 6:32.54 | Q |
| 2 | Park Sang-eon | South Korea | 22 | 6:32.70 | Q |
| 3 | Jonathan Tobon | United States | 12 | 6:32.82 | Q |
| 4 | Sebas Diniz | Netherlands | 4 | 6:33.04 | Q |
| 5 | Yudai Yamamoto | Japan | 3 | 6:36.80 | Q |
| 6 | Ignaz Gschwentner | Austria | 3 | 6:57.28 | Q |
| 7 | Pavel Taran | Russia | 2 | 6:33.58 | Q |
| 8 | Felix Motschmann | Germany | 2 | 6:33.95 | Q |
| 9 | Nuraly Akzhol | Kazakhstan | 1 | 6:38.94 | |
| 10 | Tuukka Suomalainen | Finland | 0 | 6:34.51 | |
| 11 | Jakub Kočí | Czech Republic | 0 | 6:34.64 | |
| 12 | Andrei Herman | Belarus | 0 | 6:34.96 | |
| 13 | Nicky Rosanelli | Italy | 0 | 6:35.38 | |
| 14 | Michał Kopacz | Poland | 0 | 6:37.84 | |
| 15 | Xue Zhiwen | China | 0 | 6:43.49 | |
| 16 | Sander Eitrem | Norway | | DNF | |

=== Final ===
The final was held at 12:40.

| Rank | Name | Country | Points | Time |
|---|---|---|---|---|
| 1st place, gold medalist(s) | Motonaga Arito | Japan | 30 | 6:29.72 |
| 2nd place, silver medalist(s) | Diego Amaya | Colombia | 20 | 6:30.33 |
| 3rd place, bronze medalist(s) | Pavel Taran | Russia | 10 | 6:30.41 |
| 4 | Max Fiodarav | Belarus | 6 | 6:43.41 |
| 5 | Sun Jiazhao | China | 4 | 6:30.75 |
| 6 | Felix Motschmann | Germany | 4 | 6:49.35 |
| 7 | Ignaz Gschwentner | Austria | 2 | 6:30.89 |
| 8 | Jonathan Tobon | United States | 1 | 6:30.97 |
| 9 | Remo Slotegraaf | Netherlands | 1 | 6:37.71 |
| 10 | Yudai Yamamoto | Japan | 1 | 6:49.70 |
| 11 | Park Sang-eon | South Korea | 0 | 6:31.18 |
| 12 | Oddbjørn Mellemstrand | Norway | 0 | 6:33.04 |
| 13 | Alexander Sergeev | Russia | 0 | 6:33.87 |
| 14 | Nil Llop | Spain | 0 | 6:33.94 |
| 15 | Flavio Gross | Switzerland | 0 | 6:35.31 |
| 16 | Sebas Diniz | Netherlands | 0 | 6:40.58 |
