= 2023 World Junior Speed Skating Championships =

International speed skating competition

- Venue: Max Aicher Arena, Inzell, Germany
- Dates: 10–12 February

Medalist men
1st place, gold medalist(s)		Jordan Stolz	United States
2nd place, silver medalist(s)		Yang Ho-jun	South Korea
3rd place, bronze medalist(s)		Tim Prins	Netherlands

Medalist women
1st place, gold medalist(s)		Angel Daleman	Netherlands
2nd place, silver medalist(s)		Greta Myers	United States
3rd place, bronze medalist(s)		Jade Groenewoud	Netherlands

The 2023 World Junior Speed Skating Championships took place from 10 to 12 February 2023 in Inzell, Germany.

== Schedule ==
All times are local (UTC+1).

Date	Time	Events
10 February	10:00	500 m women 500 m men 1500 m women 1500 m men Mass start semifinals women Mass start semifinals men
11 February	10:00	1000 m women 1000 m men 3000 m women 5000 m men
12 February	10:00	Team pursuit women Team pursuit men Team sprint women Team sprint men Mass start final women Mass start final men

== Medal summary ==
=== Medal table ===
* Host nation (Germany)

Rank	Nation	Gold	Silver	Bronze	Total
1	Netherlands	7	7	4	18
2	United States	5	2	4	11
3	Japan	1	2	2	5
4	Norway	1	1	0	2
5	Italy	1	0	1	2
6	Czech Republic	1	0	0	1
7	Kazakhstan	0	2	1	3
8	South Korea	0	1	3	4
9	Canada	0	1	0	1
10	Germany*	0	0	1	1
Totals (10 entries)		16	16	16	48

=== Men's events ===
Event	Gold		Silver		Bronze	
500 m	Jordan Stolz; United States	34.95	Issa Gunji; Japan	34.97	Tim Prins; Netherlands	35.73
1000 m	Jordan Stolz; United States	1:08.28	Tim Prins; Netherlands	1:09.25	Issa Gunji; Japan	1:10.30
1500 m	Jordan Stolz; United States	1:45.17	Kotaro Kasahara; Japan	1:47.14	Yang Ho-jun; South Korea	1:47.90
5000 m	Sigurd Henriksen; Norway	6:15.30	Remco Stam; Netherlands	6:26.10	Jordan Stolz; United States	6:27.68
Mass start	Lukáš Steklý; Czech Republic	34 pts	Daniel Hall; Canada	22 pts	Jordan Stolz; United States	10 pts
Team pursuit	Netherlands; Sijmen Egberts; Tim Prins; Remco Stam	3:51.61	Norway; Emil Pedersen Matre; Sigurd Henriksen; Didrik Eng Strand	3:52.48	Japan; So Kikuhara; Shomu Sasaki; Kotaro Kasahara	3:53.14
Team sprint	United States; Jonathan Tobon; Auggie Herman; Jordan Stolz	1:20.89	Netherlands; Sijmen Egberts; Jenning de Boo; Tim Prins	1:22.05	South Korea; Jun Kyu-dam; Koo Kyung-min; Yang Ho-jun	1:22.44
Overall classification	Jordan Stolz; United States	142.914	Yang Ho-jun; South Korea	147.222	Tim Prins; Netherlands	147.587

=== Women's events ===
Event	Gold		Silver		Bronze	
500 m	Serena Pergher; Italy	38.61	Angel Daleman; Netherlands	38.93	Alina Dauranova; Kazakhstan	39.10
1000 m	Angel Daleman; Netherlands	1:16.29	Alina Dauranova; Kazakhstan	1:17.76	Greta Myers; United States	1:17.82
1500 m	Angel Daleman; Netherlands	1:58.81	Jade Groenewoud; Netherlands	2:00.04	Greta Myers; United States	2:00.56
3000 m	Momoka Horikawa; Japan	4:04.72	Jade Groenewoud; Netherlands	4:11.69	Angel Daleman; Netherlands	4:11.75
Mass start	Angel Daleman; Netherlands	30 pts	Chloé Hoogendoorn; Netherlands	20 pts	Jeong Yu-na; South Korea	10 pts
Team pursuit	Netherlands; Chloé Hoogendoorn; Jade Groenewoud; Angel Daleman	3:03.75	United States; Greta Myers; Talia Staehle; Marley Soldan	3:12.45	Germany; Maira Jasch; Josephine Schlörb; Melissa Schaefer	3:12.68
Team sprint	Netherlands; Pien Hersman; Pien Smit; Angel Daleman	1:29.52	Kazakhstan; Alena Lifatova; Arina Ilyachsehenko; Alina Dauranova	1:30.86	Italy; Giorgia Fusetto; Serena Pergher; Giorgia Aiello	1:33.06
Overall classification	Angel Daleman; Netherlands	158.636	Greta Myers; United States	160.903	Jade Groenewoud; Netherlands	162.051
