= Sofia Beggin =

Italian racing cyclist (born 1997)

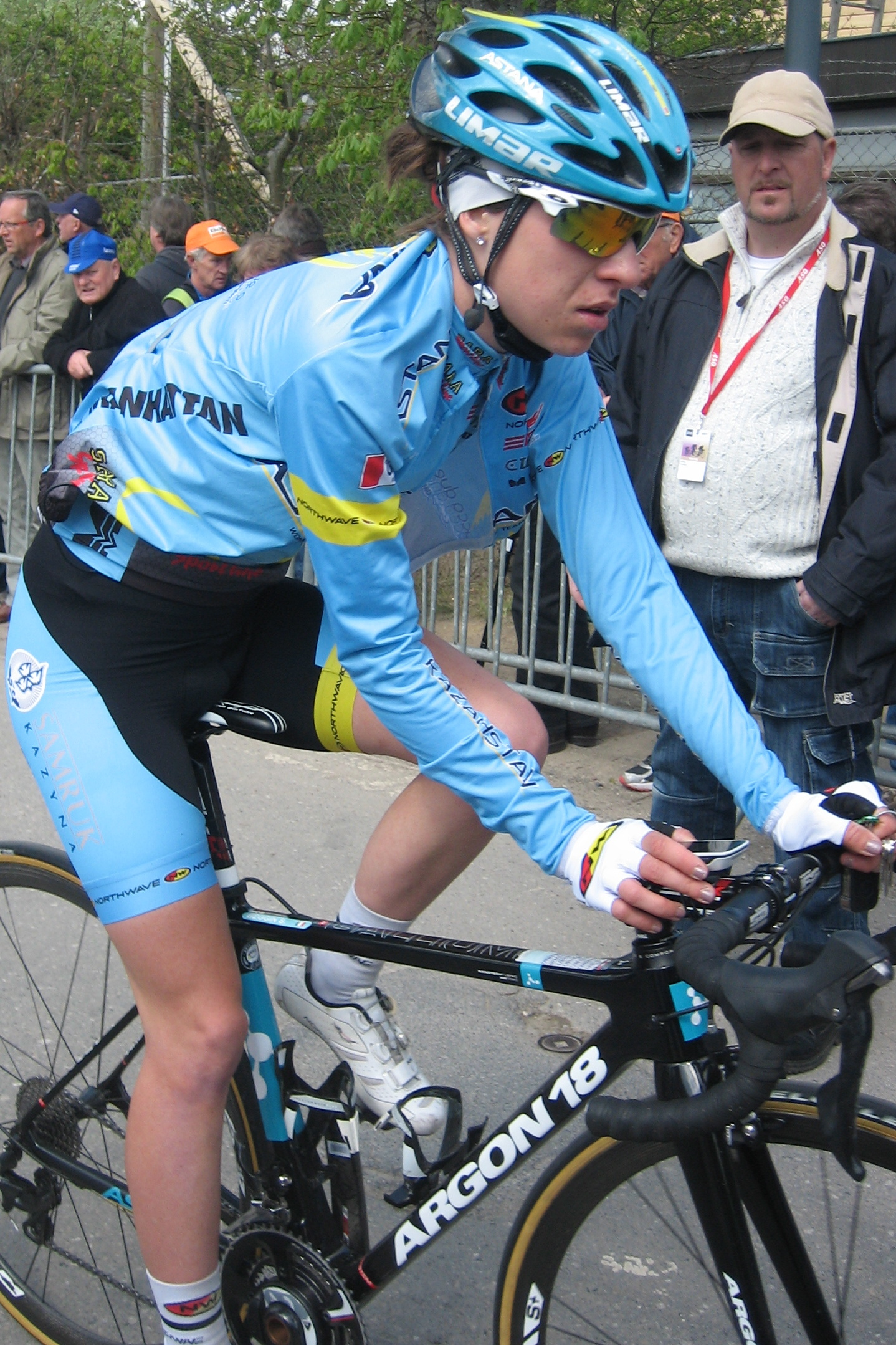
- Beggin at the 2017 La Flèche Wallonne Féminine

Personal information
- Full name: Sofia Beggin
- Born: 12 October 1997 (age 29) Abano Terme, Italy

Cycling career
- Sport: Cycling
- Discipline: Road
- Role: Rider

Professional teams
- 2016–2018: Astana
- 2019: Aromitalia–Basso Bikes–Vaiano

Sofia Beggin (born 12 October 1997) is an Italian professional racing cyclist, who last rode for UCI Women's Team Aromitalia–Basso Bikes–Vaiano.

== See also ==
- List of 2016 UCI Women's Teams and riders
