= Brandon Rivera =

Colombian cyclist

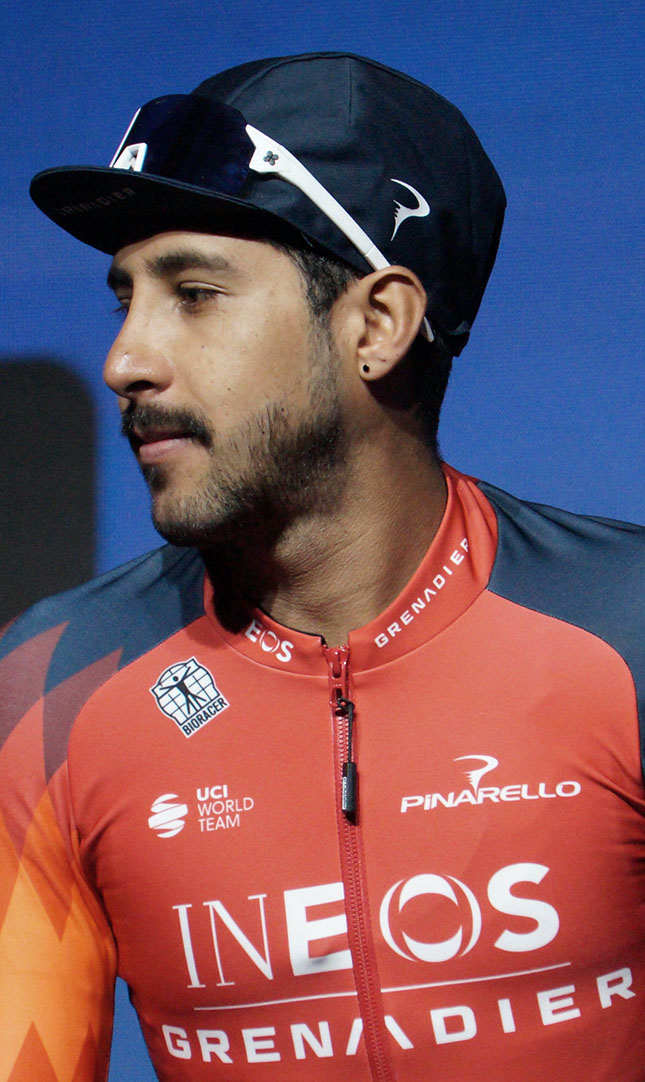
- Rivera in 2023

Personal information
- Full name: Brandon Smith Rivera Vargas
- Born: 21 March 1996 (age 30) Zipaquirá, Colombia
- Height: 1.70 m (5 ft 7 in)
- Weight: 60 kg (132 lb)

Cycling career
- Sport: Cycling
- Current team: Netcompany–Ineos
- Discipline: Road
- Role: Rider
- Rider type: Climber

Professional teams
- 2019: GW–Shimano
- 2020–: Team INEOS

Major wins
- One-day races and Classics National Time Trial Championships (2026)
Medal record
Men's road cycling
Representing Colombia
Pan American Championships
Gold medal – first place	2019 Pachuca	Time trial

Brandon Smith Rivera Vargas (born 21 March 1996) is a Colombian professional racing cyclist, who currently rides for UCI WorldTeam Netcompany–Ineos. In October 2020, he was named in the startlist for the 2020 Vuelta a España.

== Major results ==
2014
1st Team, Youth Olympic Games (with Jhon Anderson Rodríguez)
2017
4th Road race, Games of the Small States of Europe
2018
3rd Time trial, National Under-23 Road Championships
2019 (1 pro win)
1st Time trial, Pan American Road Championships
4th Time trial, Pan American Games
2020
4th Time trial, National Road Championships
2022
6th Overall CRO Race
2023
5th Overall Vuelta a San Juan
10th Overall Route d'Occitanie
2024 (1)
2nd Time trial, National Road Championships
2nd Overall Tour of Austria

1st Stage 1

8th Overall UAE Tour
8th Overall Vuelta a Burgos
2025
National Road Championships

3rd Time trial
5th Road race

2026 (1)
1st Time trial, National Road Championships
3rd Overall Tour de la Provence

=== Grand Tour general classification results timeline ===
Grand Tour	2020	2021	2022	2023	2024
Giro d'Italia	—	—	—	—	—
Tour de France	—	—	—	—	—
Vuelta a España	DNF	—	—	—	95

Legend
—	Did not compete
DNF	Did not finish
