= Cycling at the 2014 Summer Youth Olympics =

Cycling at the II Summer Youth Olympic Games
- Venue: Nanjing Olympic Sports Center; Laoshan National Forest Park
- Dates: 17–24 August
- No. of events: 3 (1 boys, 1 girls, 1 mixed)

Cycling at the 2014 Summer Youth Olympics was held from August 17 to August 24. The events took place at the Nanjing Olympic Sports Center and Laoshan National Forest Park in Nanjing, China.

== Format ==
For the Youth Olympics, athletes competed in teams instead of competing separately. In the boys' and girls' team event, two athletes compete together. Each of the two riders must compete in two of the following events, with only one team member competing per event: BMX, Mountain Bike Cross-country Race, Mountain Bike Cross-country Eliminator and Road Time Trial. Both members will also have to compete in the Road Race event.

For the mixed team relay, two boys and two girls formed a team. The event was composed of a Mountain Bike Cross-country Race, performed by one boy and one girl and a Road Race, performed by the other two team members. For NOCs who qualified, only two men or women lots will be drawn to form combined teams.

== Qualification ==
Each National Olympic Committee (NOC) could enter a maximum of two teams of two athletes, one per each gender. As hosts, China was given the maximum quota, but only elected to send a female team and a further six teams. Three teams in each gender was initially given to the Tripartite Commission, but only three spots were given. The other spots were reallocated. The remaining 28 teams were decided by rankings from the 2013 Junior Mountain Bike World Championships, 2013 Junior BMX World Championships, 2013 Women's Junior Road World Championships and 2013 Men's Junior Road Nations Cup (events between 1 April 2013 and 31 March 2014 are considered).

After the rankings were published, teams qualified based on the following criteria until 28 teams were listed. To be eligible to participate at the 2014 Youth Olympics, athletes must have been born between 1 January 1996 and 31 December 1997. Furthermore, at least two athletes from qualified NOCs were required to take part with in the men's event and/or two athletes in the women's event.

Criterion 1

The nations ranked in all three rankings (Road, Mountain Bike and BMX) qualify their NOC. If the qualification place quotas are exceeded, priority will be as follows:

1. NOCs ranked highest in the Road rankings
2. NOCs ranked highest in the Mountain Bike rankings
3. NOCs ranked highest in the BMX rankings

Criterion 2

If there are quota places remaining after criterion 1 the nations ranked in two of the three rankings qualify their NOC in the following order of priority:

1. NOCs ranked in the Road and Mountain Bike rankings
2. NOCs ranked in the Mountain Bike and BMX rankings
3. NOCs ranked in the Road and BMX rankings

If the qualification place quotas are exceeded, priority will be as follows:

1. NOCs ranked highest in the Road rankings
2. NOCs ranked highest in the Mountain Bike rankings

Criterion 3

If there are quota places remaining after criterion 2. The following steps will be used to fill the places.

3.1 Firstly nations qualified in the opposite gender in accordance to criterion 1 or 2, will qualify their NOC provided that these nations are placed in one of the rankings in the following priority:

1. NOCs ranked highest in the Road rankings
2. NOCs ranked highest in the Mountain Bike rankings
3. NOCs ranked highest in the BMX rankings

3.2 Second nations placed in only one of the rankings will qualify their nations in the following priority:

1. NOCs ranked highest in the Road rankings
2. NOCs ranked highest in the Mountain Bike rankings
3. NOCs ranked highest in the BMX rankings

3.3 Finally should there be quotas remaining the highest ranked teams in the opposite gender shall qualify a team in the following priority.

1. NOCs ranked highest in the opposite gender's Road rankings
2. NOCs ranked highest in the opposite gender's Mountain Bike rankings
3. NOCs ranked highest in the opposite gender's BMX rankings

=== Boys ===
Criterion	Rankings Appeared In	Total Places	Qualified
Host Nation	-	0	~~China~~
Criterion 1	Road/MTB/BMX	7	Belgium; Colombia; Denmark; Ecuador; Italy; Netherlands; South Africa
Criterion 2	Road/MTB	7	Austria; Hungary; Kazakhstan; Poland; Portugal; Slovenia; Ukraine
Criterion 2	MTB/BMX	5	Argentina; Brazil; Czech Republic; Japan; Mexico
Criterion 2	Road/BMX	0	
Criterion 3.1	Road	0	
Criterion 3.1	MTB	1	Serbia
Criterion 3.1	BMX	0	
Criterion 3.2	Road	7	Albania; Algeria; Belarus; Egypt; Greece; Guatemala; Morocco
Criterion 3.2	MTB	3	Lesotho; Macedonia; Namibia
Tripartite Invitation	-	2	Belize; Eritrea
TOTAL		32	

=== Girls ===
Criterion	Rankings Appeared In	Total Places	Qualified
Host Nation	-	1	China
Criterion 1	Road/MTB/BMX	2	Mexico; Netherlands
Criterion 2	Road/MTB	8	Colombia; Czech Republic; Italy; Lithuania; Poland; Serbia; South Africa; Ukraine
Criterion 2	MTB/BMX	0	
Criterion 2	Road/BMX	0	
Criterion 3.1	Road	3	Belgium; Denmark; Japan
Criterion 3.1	MTB	2	Argentina; Austria
Criterion 3.1	BMX	2	Brazil; Ecuador
Criterion 3.2	Road	4	Belarus; Estonia; Slovakia; Spain
Criterion 3.2	MTB	1	Mauritius
Criterion 3.2	BMX	2	Bolivia; Venezuela
Criterion 3.3	Road	6	Algeria; Guatemala; Hungary; Kazakhstan; Portugal; Slovenia
Tripartite Invitation	-	1	Rwanda
TOTAL		32	

== Schedule ==
The schedule was released by the UCI.

All times are CST (UTC+8)

Event date	Event day	Starting time	Event details
August 17	Sunday	09:00	Boys' and Girls' XC Eliminator
August 18	Monday	09:00	Boys' and Girls' Time Trial
August 19	Tuesday	09:00	Boys' and Girls' BMX Seeding
August 19	Tuesday	15:00	Boys' and Girls' BMX Finals
August 20	Wednesday	09:00	Girls' XC Race
August 20	Wednesday	10:30	Boys' XC Race
August 22	Friday	08:30	Girls' Road Race
August 22	Friday	10:30	Boys' Road Race
August 24	Sunday	09:00	Mixed Team Relay

== Medal summary ==
=== Medal table ===
Rank	Nation	Gold	Silver	Bronze	Total
1	Czech Republic	1	1	0	2
1	Italy	1	1	0	2
3	Colombia	1	0	0	1
4	Denmark	0	1	1	2
5	Netherlands	0	0	1	1
5	Ukraine	0	0	1	1
Totals (6 entries)		3	3	3	9

=== Results ===
Event	Gold	Silver	Bronze
Boys' team	Colombia; Brandon Rivera; Jhon Anderson Rodríguez	Denmark; Mikkel Frølich Honoré; Rasmus Salling	Netherlands; Niek Kimmann; Wiebe Scholten
Girls' team	Italy; Sofia Beggin; Chiara Teocchi	Czech Republic; Nikola Noskova; Barbora Prudkova	Denmark; Anna Madsen; Pernille Mathiesen
Mixed team relay	Czech Republic; Barbora Prudkova; Jan Rajchart; Roman Lehky; Nikola Noskova	Italy; Chiara Teocchi; Federico Mandelli; Manuel Todaro; Sofia Beggin	Ukraine; Darya Tkachova; Vladyslav Nizitskyi; Rinat Udod; Anzhelika Teterych
