= Jhon Anderson Rodríguez =

Colombian cyclist

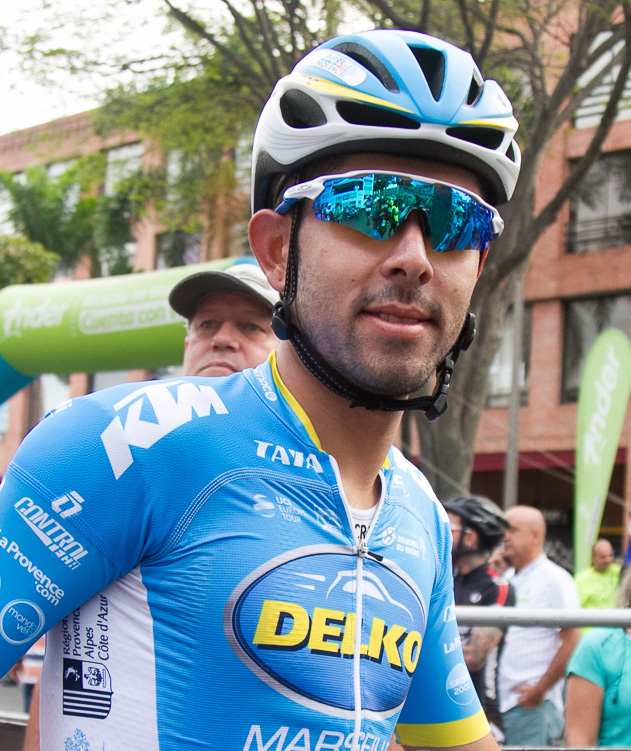

Personal information
- Full name: Jhon Anderson Rodríguez Salazar
- Born: 12 October 1996 (age 30) Manizales, Colombia
- Height: 1.72 m (5 ft 8 in)
- Weight: 62 kg (137 lb)

Cycling career
- Sport: Cycling
- Current team: Nu Colombia
- Discipline: Road
- Role: Rider

Professional teams
- 2015–2016: EPM–UNE–Área Metropolitana
- 2017–2018: Delko–Marseille Provence KTM
- 2019–: EPM

Jhon Anderson Rodríguez Salazar (born 12 October 1996 in Manizales) is a Colombian cyclist, who currently rides for UCI Continental team Nu Colombia.

== Major results ==
2013
1st Time trial, National Junior Road Championships
2014
1st Team (with Brandon Rivera), Youth Olympic Games
2016
1st Stage 5 Tour de l'Avenir
Pan American Under-23 Road Championships

3rd Road race
3rd Time trial

2017
1st Young rider classification Tour d'Azerbaïdjan
