= Sebastián Uprimny =

Colombian cross-country skier

Personal information
- Born: June 30, 1975 Paris, France

Sport
- Country: Colombia
- Sport: Cross-country skiing

Achievements and titles
- Olympic finals: 2018 Pyeongchang

Sebastián Uprimny (born 30 June 1975) is a Colombian cross-country skier. He represented Colombia at the 2018 Winter Olympics in Pyeongchang, becoming the first Colombian athlete to compete in cross-country skiing at the Winter Olympic Games.

== Early life ==
Uprimny was born in Paris, France, to Colombian parents and later grew up in Bogotá, Colombia. He moved to the United States in 2000, settling in Salt Lake City, Utah, where he was exposed to winter sports culture during the period surrounding the 2002 Winter Olympics.

== Cross-country skiing career ==
Uprimny began training in cross-country skiing as an adult, selecting the sport as a viable pathway to Olympic qualification for a country without an established winter sports tradition. He trained primarily in the United States while representing Colombia internationally.

== Olympic participation ==
Uprimny qualified for the 2018 Winter Olympics in Pyeongchang, South Korea. He competed in the Men's 15 kilometre freestyle event, marking Colombia's debut in Olympic cross-country skiing. He finished 111th in the event.

== Legacy ==
Uprimny's participation at the 2018 Winter Olympics contributed to increased visibility of winter sports in Colombia. He has expressed interest in supporting the development of cross-country skiing and winter sports programs in non-traditional winter sport nations.

== See also ==
- Colombia at the Winter Olympics
- Cross-country skiing
- 2018 Winter Olympics
