= Cycling at the 2010 Summer Youth Olympics =

Cycling at the I Summer Youth Olympic Games
- Venue: The Float at Marina Bay (road); Tampines Bike Park (BMX, mountain)
- Dates: 17 – 22 August 2010
- No. of events: 1 (1 mixed)
- Competitors: 288 (192 boys, 96 girls)

Cycling at the 2010 Summer Youth Olympics was held from 17 to 22 August. The event took place at The Float at Marina Bay for the road cycling and at Tampines Bike Park for the BMX and mountain biking.

== Format ==
There was one event held, a combined mixed-gender team event with sub-events in the disciplines of bicycle motocross (BMX), road cycling and mountain biking. Each team consisted of three boys and one girl, with the three boys required to compete in one discipline each (BMX, MTB and road time trial) while the girl had to compete in all three disciplines. All male riders also had to compete in the road race.

== Qualification ==
The qualification system for the Youth Olympic Games is principally based on two sets of criteria, related to endurance and performance.

- The first (endurance) is calculated based on the final ranking of the 2009 UCI Juniors Nations Cup.
- The second (performance) is calculated based on the nations ranking for the UCI Mountain Bike and BMX World Championships for the 2009 season.

It is therefore obviously vital for the athletes to compete in these events, where their results could enable them to qualify the country for the Singapore Youth Olympic Games.

=== Endurance criteria ===
2009 UCI Juniors Nations' Cup

Event	Date	Country
Paris–Roubaix Juniors	12.4.2009	France
Course de la Paix Junior	6-10.5.2009	Czech Republic
Trofeo Karlsberg	11-14.6.2009	Germany
GP Général Patton	11-12.7.2009	Luxembourg
Tour de l’Abitibi	21-26.7.2009	Canada
UCI Juniors World Championships (time trial)	7.8.2009	Russia
UCI Juniors World Championships (road race)	9.8.2009	Russia
Kroz Istru/Tour d’Istrie	18-20.9.2009	Croatia

=== Performance Criteria ===
UCI BMX World Championships

Event	Date	Host city
UCI BMX World Championships	23-26.7.2009	Australia, Adelaïde

UCI Mountain Bike World Championships

Event	Date	Host city
UCI Mountain Bike World Championships	1-6.9.2009	Australia, Canberra

== Schedule ==
Event date	Event day	Starting time	Event details
17 August	Tuesday	09:00	Girls' Cross Country
17 August	Tuesday	17:00	Boys' Cross Country
18 August	Wednesday	10:00	Boys' Time Trial
19 August	Thursday	16:10	Girls' BMX
19 August	Thursday	16:17	Boys' BMX
22 August	Sunday	09:00	Girls' Time Trial
22 August	Sunday	11:30	Boys' Road Race

== Medalists ==
Games	Gold	Silver	Bronze
Combined mixed team	Colombia; Jessica Lergada; Jhonnatan Botero Villegas; Brayan Ramírez; David Oquendo	Italy; Alessia Bulleri; Andrea Righettini; Nicolas Marini; Mattia Furlan	Netherlands; Maartje Hereijgers; Thijs Zuurbier; Friso Roscam Abbing Ijpeij; Twan van Gendt
