= Curling at the 2016 Winter Youth Olympics – Mixed team =

Curling – Mixed team at the II Winter Youth Olympic Games
- Venue: Kristins Hall
- Dates: 12–17 February

Medalists
1st place, gold medalist(s)		Mary Fay; Tyler Tardi; Karlee Burgess; Sterling Middleton	Canada
2nd place, silver medalist(s)		Luc Violette; Cora Farrell; Ben Richardson; Cait Flannery	United States
3rd place, bronze medalist(s)		Selina Witschonke; Henwy Lochmann; Laura Engler; Philipp Hösli	Switzerland

Mixed team curling at the 2016 Winter Youth Olympics was held from 12 to 17 February at the Kristins Hall in Lillehammer, Norway.

== Teams ==
=== Group A ===
China	Italy	Japan	New Zealand
Skip: Du Hongrui; Third: Zhao Ruiyi; Second: Zhang Wenxin; Lead: Han Yu	Skip: Luca Rizzolli; Third: Stefania Constantini; Second: Alberto Zisa; Lead: Martina Ghezze	Skip: Kota Ito; Third: Yako Matsuzawa; Second: Kosuke Aita; Lead: Honoka Sasaki	Skip: Matthew Neilson; Third: Holly Thompson; Second: Ben Smith; Lead: Courtney Smith
Russia	Switzerland	Turkey	United States
Fourth: German Doronin; Skip: Nadezhda Karelina; Second: Sergey Maksimov; Lead: Mariia Arkhipova	Skip: Selina Witschonke; Third: Henwy Lochmann; Second: Laura Engler; Lead: Philipp Hösli	Skip: Oğuzhan Karakurt; Third: Berivan Polat; Second: Tunç Esenboga; Lead: Beyzanur Konuksever	Skip: Luc Violette; Third: Cora Farrell; Second: Ben Richardson; Lead: Cait Flannery

=== Group B ===
Brazil	Canada	Czech Republic	Estonia
Skip: Victor Santos; Third: Raissa Rodrigues; Second: Elian Rocha; Lead: Giovanna Barros	Skip: Mary Fay; Third: Tyler Tardi; Second: Karlee Burgess; Lead: Sterling Middleton	Skip: Pavel Mareš; Third: Kristina Podrábská; Second: Martin Blahovec; Lead: Andrea Krupanská	Skip: Eiko-Siim Peips; Third: Kristin Laidsalu; Second: Jarl Guštšin; Lead: Britta Sillaots
Great Britain	Norway	South Korea	Sweden
Skip: Ross Whyte; Third: Amy Bryce; Second: Callum Kinnear; Lead: Mili Smith	Fourth: Michael Mellemseter; Skip: Maia Ramsfjell; Second: Andreas Hårstad; Lead: Eline Mjøen	Skip: Hong Yun-jeong; Third: Oh Su-yun; Second: Kim Ho-geon; Lead: Lee Ji-young	Skip: Johan Nygren; Third: Tova Pettersson; Second: Anton Degerfeldt; Lead: Jenny Jonasson

== Round-robin standings ==
Key
Teams to Playoffs
Teams to Tiebreakers

Final round-robin standings

Group A	Skip	W	L
United States	Luc Violette	6	1
Switzerland	Selina Witschonke	6	1
Russia	Nadezhda Karelina	6	1
Turkey	Oğuzhan Karakurt	3	4
Italy	Luca Rizzolli	3	4
China	Du Hongrui	2	5
New Zealand	Matthew Neilson	1	6
Japan	Kota Ito	1	6

Final round-robin standings

Group B	Skip	W	L
Canada	Mary Fay	7	0
Great Britain	Ross Whyte	6	1
Sweden	Johan Nygren	5	2
Norway	Maia Ramsfjell	4	3
South Korea	Hong Yun-jeong	3	4
Czech Republic	Pavel Mareš	2	5
Estonia	Eiko-Siim Peips	1	6
Brazil	Victor Santos	0	7

== Round-robin results ==
All draw times are listed in Central European Time (UTC+01).

=== Group A ===
==== Friday, February 12 ====
Draw 1 9:00

Sheet A	1	2	3	4	5	6	7	8	Final
Japan (Ito)	0	0	1	0	0	0	0	X	1
Italy (Rizzolli)	0	1	0	3	0	1	2	X	7

Sheet B	1	2	3	4	5	6	7	8	Final
Russia (Karelina)	3	0	1	0	2	0	0	1	7
New Zealand (Neilson)	0	2	0	1	0	0	2	0	5

Sheet C	1	2	3	4	5	6	7	8	Final
Turkey (Karakurt)	0	0	0	2	0	0	1	X	3
United States (Violette)	1	0	1	0	2	3	0	X	7

Sheet D	1	2	3	4	5	6	7	8	Final
China (Du)	0	0	1	0	0	1	0	X	2
Switzerland (Witschonke)	1	1	0	3	1	0	1	X	7

==== Saturday, February 13 ====
Draw 2 9:00

Sheet A	1	2	3	4	5	6	7	8	Final
United States (Violette)	0	0	2	0	2	0	0	2	6
Switzerland (Witschonke)	0	1	0	1	0	3	0	0	5

Sheet B	1	2	3	4	5	6	7	8	Final
Turkey (Karakurt)	0	1	1	0	2	0	0	X	4
China (Du)	2	0	0	1	0	3	3	X	9

Sheet C	1	2	3	4	5	6	7	8	Final
Italy (Rizzolli)	1	0	2	2	1	1	0	X	7
New Zealand (Neilson)	0	1	0	0	0	0	1	X	2

Sheet D	1	2	3	4	5	6	7	8	Final
Japan (Ito)	1	0	0	1	0	1	0	0	3
Russia (Karelina)	0	2	0	0	1	0	1	1	5

Draw 3 16:00

Sheet A	1	2	3	4	5	6	7	8	Final
Turkey (Karakurt)	2	0	2	1	2	0	6	X	13
New Zealand (Neilson)	0	4	0	0	0	1	0	X	5

Sheet B	1	2	3	4	5	6	7	8	9	Final
Japan (Ito)	0	1	0	1	1	1	0	1	0	5
Switzerland (Witschonke)	4	0	1	0	0	0	0	0	1	6

Sheet C	1	2	3	4	5	6	7	8	Final
China (Du)	0	0	2	1	0	1	0	X	4
Russia (Karelina)	2	0	0	0	2	0	2	X	6

Sheet D	1	2	3	4	5	6	7	8	Final
Italy (Rizzolli)	0	0	1	0	2	0	2	0	5
United States (Violette)	2	2	0	1	0	2	0	1	8

==== Sunday, February 14 ====
Draw 4 9:00

Sheet A	1	2	3	4	5	6	7	8	Final
Russia (Karelina)	0	1	3	1	0	3	0	1	9
United States (Violette)	1	0	0	0	2	0	3	0	6

Sheet B	1	2	3	4	5	6	7	8	Final
China (Du)	0	1	0	0	1	1	0	X	3
Italy (Rizzolli)	1	0	2	1	0	0	2	X	6

Sheet C	1	2	3	4	5	6	7	8	Final
Japan (Ito)	0	0	1	0	0	1	1	X	3
Turkey (Karakurt)	1	1	0	0	2	0	0	X	4

Sheet D	1	2	3	4	5	6	7	8	Final
Switzerland (Witschonke)	0	3	3	0	1	0	2	X	9
New Zealand (Neilson)	2	0	0	1	0	1	0	X	4

Draw 5 16:00

Sheet A	1	2	3	4	5	6	7	8	Final
China (Du)	1	0	0	1	1	0	0	X	3
Japan (Ito)	0	2	1	0	0	2	2	X	7

Sheet B	1	2	3	4	5	6	7	8	Final
New Zealand (Neilson)	2	0	0	0	1	0	0	X	3
United States (Violette)	0	2	1	3	0	2	2	X	10

Sheet C	1	2	3	4	5	6	7	8	Final
Russia (Karelina)	0	0	1	0	1	0	3	0	5
Switzerland (Witschonke)	1	1	0	2	0	2	0	1	7

Sheet D	1	2	3	4	5	6	7	8	Final
Turkey (Karakurt)	0	1	0	4	0	2	2	X	9
Italy (Rizzolli)	1	0	1	0	3	0	0	X	5

==== Monday, February 15 ====
Draw 6 9:00

Sheet A	1	2	3	4	5	6	7	8	Final
Italy (Rizzolli)	1	1	0	0	1	0	0	X	3
Russia (Karelina)	0	0	2	2	0	1	0	X	5

Sheet B	1	2	3	4	5	6	7	8	Final
Switzerland (Witschonke)	1	0	2	0	1	3	0	X	7
Turkey (Karakurt)	0	1	0	1	0	0	1	X	3

Sheet C	1	2	3	4	5	6	7	8	Final
New Zealand (Neilson)	2	0	0	0	3	0	2	X	7
Japan (Ito)	0	2	1	1	0	1	0	X	5

Sheet D	1	2	3	4	5	6	7	8	Final
United States (Violette)	2	1	1	0	0	1	0	X	5
China (Du)	0	0	0	1	0	0	1	X	2

Draw 7 16:00

Sheet A	1	2	3	4	5	6	7	8	Final
New Zealand (Neilson)	0	0	2	1	2	0	0	0	5
China (Du)	1	1	0	0	0	2	1	1	6

Sheet B	1	2	3	4	5	6	7	8	Final
United States (Violette)	2	0	0	1	0	5	1	X	9
Japan (Ito)	0	0	1	0	2	0	0	X	3

Sheet C	1	2	3	4	5	6	7	8	Final
Switzerland (Witschonke)	0	2	1	0	2	3	0	1	9
Italy (Rizzolli)	0	0	0	4	0	0	2	0	6

Sheet D	1	2	3	4	5	6	7	8	Final
Russia (Karelina)	1	0	1	1	0	1	0	1	5
Turkey (Karakurt)	0	1	0	0	1	0	1	0	3

=== Group B ===
==== Friday, February 12 ====
Draw 1 12:30

Sheet A	1	2	3	4	5	6	7	8	Final
Brazil (Santos)	0	0	0	0	0	0	X	X	0
Czech Republic (Mareš)	6	2	2	5	2	2	X	X	19

Sheet B	1	2	3	4	5	6	7	8	9	Final
Sweden (Nygren)	0	2	0	1	0	1	0	3	1	8
Norway (Ramsfjell)	2	0	1	0	2	0	2	0	0	7

Sheet C	1	2	3	4	5	6	7	8	Final
Estonia (Peips)	0	1	0	1	0	0	X	X	2
Canada (Fay)	5	0	2	0	4	2	X	X	13

Sheet D	1	2	3	4	5	6	7	8	Final
South Korea (Hong)	0	1	0	0	0	0	1	X	2
Great Britain (Whyte)	2	0	1	1	2	3	0	X	9

==== Saturday, February 13 ====
Draw 2 12:30

Sheet A	1	2	3	4	5	6	7	8	Final
Canada (Fay)	0	0	0	0	1	0	1	2	4
Great Britain (Whyte)	0	0	1	0	0	1	0	0	2

Sheet C	1	2	3	4	5	6	7	8	Final
Estonia (Peips)	0	1	0	2	0	0	1	0	4
South Korea (Hong)	3	0	1	0	1	0	0	1	6

Sheet C	1	2	3	4	5	6	7	8	Final
Czech Republic (Mareš)	1	0	0	1	0	1	X	X	3
Norway (Ramsfjell)	0	2	2	0	6	0	X	X	10

Sheet D	1	2	3	4	5	6	7	8	Final
Brazil (Santos)	0	0	0	0	0	0	X	X	0
Sweden (Nygren)	5	3	1	2	4	2	X	X	17

Draw 3 19:30

Sheet A	1	2	3	4	5	6	7	8	Final
Estonia (Peips)	0	0	1	0	0	0	X	X	1
Norway (Ramsfjell)	4	1	0	1	0	2	X	X	8

Sheet B	1	2	3	4	5	6	7	8	Final
Brazil (Santos)	0	0	0	0	0	0	X	X	0
Great Britain (Whyte)	5	2	2	3	6	3	X	X	21

Sheet C	1	2	3	4	5	6	7	8	Final
South Korea (Hong)	1	0	1	1	0	0	0	X	3
Sweden (Nygren)	0	2	0	0	3	1	1	X	7

Sheet D	1	2	3	4	5	6	7	8	Final
Czech Republic (Mareš)	1	0	0	1	0	0	0	X	2
Canada (Fay)	0	2	0	0	2	0	1	X	5

==== Sunday, February 14 ====
Draw 4 12:30

Sheet A	1	2	3	4	5	6	7	8	Final
Sweden (Nygren)	0	2	0	0	0	0	1	0	3
Canada (Fay)	0	0	3	0	0	0	0	2	5

Sheet B	1	2	3	4	5	6	7	8	Final
South Korea (Hong)	0	2	2	0	1	2	0	X	7
Czech Republic (Mareš)	2	0	0	0	0	0	1	X	3

Sheet C	1	2	3	4	5	6	7	8	Final
Brazil (Santos)	0	0	0	1	0	0	X	X	1
Estonia (Peips)	3	2	4	0	3	3	X	X	15

Sheet D	1	2	3	4	5	6	7	8	Final
Great Britain (Whyte)	0	4	1	4	0	0	X	X	9
Norway (Ramsfjell)	1	0	0	0	2	0	X	X	3

Draw 5 19:30

Sheet A	1	2	3	4	5	6	7	8	Final
South Korea (Hong)	5	2	2	1	0	2	X	X	12
Brazil (Santos)	0	0	0	0	1	0	X	X	1

Sheet B	1	2	3	4	5	6	7	8	9	Final
Norway (Ramsfjell)	0	0	0	1	0	0	0	1	0	2
Canada (Fay)	0	0	0	0	1	1	0	0	2	4

Sheet C	1	2	3	4	5	6	7	8	Final
Sweden (Nygren)	0	1	0	0	1	0	X	X	2
Great Britain (Whyte)	4	0	2	1	0	1	X	X	8

Sheet D	1	2	3	4	5	6	7	8	Final
Estonia (Peips)	0	1	1	0	1	0	1	0	4
Czech Republic (Mareš)	3	0	0	2	0	2	0	1	8

==== Monday, February 15 ====
Draw 6 12:30

Sheet A	1	2	3	4	5	6	7	8	9	Final
Czech Republic (Mareš)	0	2	0	0	0	0	1	1	0	4
Sweden (Nygren)	2	0	0	1	0	1	0	0	1	5

Sheet B	1	2	3	4	5	6	7	8	Final
Great Britain (Whyte)	2	1	0	3	0	2	X	X	8
Estonia (Peips)	0	0	1	0	1	0	X	X	2

Sheet C	1	2	3	4	5	6	7	8	Final
Norway (Ramsfjell)	4	0	0	3	2	2	X	X	11
Brazil (Santos)	0	2	0	0	0	0	X	X	2

Sheet D	1	2	3	4	5	6	7	8	Final
Canada (Fay)	0	1	2	0	0	3	X	X	6
South Korea (Hong)	0	0	0	0	0	0	X	X	0

Draw 7 19:30

Sheet A	1	2	3	4	5	6	7	8	9	Final
Norway (Ramsfjell)	0	0	0	1	1	1	2	0	2	7
South Korea (Hong)	0	3	0	0	0	0	0	2	0	5

Sheet B	1	2	3	4	5	6	7	8	Final
Canada (Fay)	5	4	1	1	0	2	X	X	13
Brazil (Santos)	0	0	0	0	1	0	X	X	1

Sheet C	1	2	3	4	5	6	7	8	Final
Great Britain (Whyte)	0	0	4	4	0	1	X	X	9
Czech Republic (Mareš)	1	1	0	0	1	0	X	X	3

Sheet D	1	2	3	4	5	6	7	8	Final
Sweden (Nygren)	1	1	0	2	0	0	4	X	8
Estonia (Peips)	0	0	1	0	1	1	0	X	3

== Tiebreaker ==
Tuesday, February 16, 9:00

Team	1	2	3	4	5	6	7	8	Final
Turkey (Karakurt)	1	2	0	1	0	0	2	0	6
Italy (Rizzolli)	0	0	3	0	1	0	0	1	5

== Playoffs ==
Quarterfinals
B1	Canada	10
A4	Turkey	2
A2	Switzerland	7
B3	Sweden	3
A1	United States	5
B4	Norway	4
B2	Great Britain	5
A3	Russia	9

Semifinals
B1	Canada	7
A2	Switzerland	5
A1	United States	8
A3	Russia	6

Gold Medal Game
B1	Canada	10
A1	United States	4

Bronze Medal Game
A2	Switzerland	11
A3	Russia	3

=== Quarterfinals ===
Tuesday, February 16, 13:30

Sheet A	1	2	3	4	5	6	7	8	Final
Canada (Fay)	0	5	0	1	1	3	X	X	10
Turkey (Karakurt)	1	0	1	0	0	0	X	X	2

Sheet B	1	2	3	4	5	6	7	8	Final
Switzerland (Witschonke)	2	0	1	0	2	2	0	X	7
Sweden (Nygren)	0	0	0	1	0	0	2	X	3

Sheet C	1	2	3	4	5	6	7	8	9	Final
United States (Violette)	0	0	0	1	1	0	2	0	1	5
Norway (Ramsfjell)	0	0	2	0	0	1	0	1	0	4

Sheet D	1	2	3	4	5	6	7	8	Final
Great Britain (Whyte)	1	0	1	0	1	0	2	0	5
Russia (Karelina)	0	3	0	1	0	2	0	3	9

=== Semifinals ===
Tuesday, February 16, 18:00

Sheet A	1	2	3	4	5	6	7	8	Final
Canada (Fay)	0	0	2	3	0	1	0	1	7
Switzerland (Witschonke)	0	1	0	0	2	0	2	0	5

Sheet D	1	2	3	4	5	6	7	8	Final
United States (Violette)	0	2	3	0	0	2	1	0	8
Russia (Karelina)	2	0	0	3	0	0	0	1	6

=== Bronze medal game ===
Wednesday, February 17, 9:00

Sheet B	1	2	3	4	5	6	7	8	Final
Switzerland (Witschonke)	3	0	2	1	0	2	3	X	11
Russia (Karelina)	0	1	0	0	2	0	0	X	3

=== Gold medal game ===
Wednesday, February 17, 9:00

Sheet C	1	2	3	4	5	6	7	8	Final
Canada (Fay)	5	0	2	0	2	0	1	X	10
United States (Violette)	0	2	0	1	0	1	0	X	4
