= Brazil at the 2016 Winter Youth Olympics =

- IOC code: BRA
- NOC: Brazilian Olympic Committee
- Website: www.cob.org.br (in Portuguese)

in Lillehammer
- Competitors: 10 in 5 sports
- Medals: Gold 0 Silver 0 Bronze 0 Total 0

Winter Youth Olympics appearances (overview)
- 2012; 2016; 2020; 2024

Brazil competed at the 2016 Winter Youth Olympics in Lillehammer, Norway from 12 to 21 February 2016.

== Alpine skiing ==
Boys

Athlete	Event	Run 1		Run 2		Total	
Athlete	Event	Time	Rank	Time	Rank	Time	Rank
Michel Macedo	Slalom	did not finish					
Michel Macedo	Giant slalom	did not finish					
Michel Macedo	Super-G	—				1:12.35	15th
Michel Macedo	Combined	1:13.36	17th	did not finish			

== Bobsleigh ==
Athlete	Event	Run 1		Run 2		Total	
Athlete	Event	Time	Rank	Time	Rank	Time	Rank
Marley Linhares	Boys	57.86	8	58.00	7	1:55.86	8
Jéssica Victória	Girls	59.89	12	59.17	6	1:59.06	9

== Cross-country skiing ==
Boys

Athlete	Event	Qualification		Quarterfinal		Semifinal		Final	
Athlete	Event	Time	Rank	Time	Rank	Time	Rank	Time	Rank
Altair Firmino	10 km freestyle	—						29:54.7	47th
Altair Firmino	Classical sprint	3:48.45	48th	did not advance					
Altair Firmino	Cross-country cross	3:40.44	44th	—		did not advance			

== Curling ==
Brazil qualified automatically a mixed team of four athletes.

=== Mixed team ===
Team: Victor Santos (skip), Giovanna Barros (third), Elian Rocha (second), Raissa Rodrigues (lead)

Round Robin

Key
Teams to Playoffs

Group B	Skip	W	L
Canada	Mary Fay	7	0
Great Britain	Ross Whyte	6	1
Sweden	Johan Nygren	5	2
Norway	Maia Ramsfjell	4	3
South Korea	Hong Yun-jeong	3	4
Czech Republic	Pavel Mareš	2	5
Estonia	Eiko-Siim Peips	1	6
Brazil	Victor Santos	0	7

Draw 1

Sheet A	1	2	3	4	5	6	7	8	Final
Brazil (Santos)	0	0	0	0	0	0	X	X	0
Czech Republic (Mareš)	6	2	2	5	2	2	X	X	19

Draw 2

Sheet D	1	2	3	4	5	6	7	8	Final
Brazil (Santos)	0	0	0	0	0	0	X	X	0
Sweden (Nygren)	5	3	1	2	4	2	X	X	17

Draw 3

Sheet B	1	2	3	4	5	6	7	8	Final
Brazil (Santos)	0	0	0	0	0	0	X	X	0
Great Britain (Whyte)	5	2	2	3	6	3	X	X	21

Draw 4

Sheet C	1	2	3	4	5	6	7	8	Final
Brazil (Santos)	0	0	0	1	0	0	X	X	1
Estonia (Peips)	3	2	4	0	3	3	X	X	15

Draw 5

Sheet A	1	2	3	4	5	6	7	8	Final
South Korea (Hong)	5	2	2	1	0	2	X	X	12
Brazil (Santos)	0	0	0	0	1	0	X	X	1

Draw 6

Sheet C	1	2	3	4	5	6	7	8	Final
Norway (Ramsfjell)	4	0	0	3	2	2	X	X	11
Brazil (Santos)	0	2	0	0	0	0	X	X	2

Draw 7

Sheet B	1	2	3	4	5	6	7	8	Final
Canada (Fay)	5	4	1	1	0	2	X	X	13
Brazil (Santos)	0	0	0	0	1	0	X	X	1

=== Mixed doubles ===
Athletes	Event	Round of 32	Round of 16	Quarterfinals	Semifinals	Final / BM	
Athletes	Event	Opposition Result	Opposition Result	Opposition Result	Opposition Result	Opposition Result	Rank
Giovanna Barros (BRA); Ben Richardson (USA)	Mixed doubles	Jenny Jonasson (SWE); Du Hongrui (CHN); W 8 – 4	Maia Ramsfjell (NOR); Kim Ho-geon (KOR); L 7 – 9	did not advance			
Mary Fay (CAN); Elian Rocha (BRA)	Mixed doubles	Han Yu (CHN); Ross Whyte (GBR); L 5 – 9	did not advance				
Laura Engler (SUI); Victor Santos (BRA)	Mixed doubles	Zhao Ruiyi (CHN); Andreas Haarstad (NOR); L 1 – 9	did not advance				
Raissa Rodrigues (BRA); German Doronin (RUS)	Mixed doubles	Berivan Polat (TUR); Zhang Wenxin (CHN); L 5 – 9	did not advance				

Round 32

Sheet D	1	2	3	4	5	6	7	8	Final
Jenny Jonasson (SWE); Du Hongrui (CHN)	0	0	0	3	0	0	1	X	4
Giovanna Barros (BRA); Ben Richardson (USA)	2	1	1	0	2	2	0	X	8

Sheet A	1	2	3	4	5	6	7	8	Final
Mary Fay (CAN); Elian Rocha (BRA)	0	1	0	1	1	0	2	X	5
Han Yu (CHN); Ross Whyte (GBR)	4	0	3	0	0	2	0	X	9

Sheet C	1	2	3	4	5	6	7	8	Final
Laura Engler (SUI); Victor Santos (BRA)	1	0	0	0	0	0	0	X	1
Zhao Ruiyi (CHN); Andreas Hårstad (NOR)	0	1	4	2	1	1	X	X	9

Sheet B	1	2	3	4	5	6	7	8	Final
Berivan Polat (TUR); Zhang Wenxin (CHN)	2	1	0	2	0	0	0	4	9
Raissa Rodrigues (BRA); German Doronin (RUS)	0	0	1	0	1	2	1	0	5

Round 16

Sheet A	1	2	3	4	5	6	7	8	Final
Maia Ramsfjell (NOR); Kim Ho-geon (KOR)	0	0	4	1	0	2	2	X	9
Giovanna Barros (BRA); Ben Richardson (USA)	1	2	0	0	4	0	0	X	7

== Skeleton ==
Athlete	Event	Run 1		Run 2		Total	
Athlete	Event	Time	Rank	Time	Rank	Time	Rank
Robert Barbosa Neves	Boys	57.47	19	57.79	20	1:55.26	19
Laura Nascimento Amaro	Girls	58.61	20	58.05	19	1:56.66	20
