= China at the 2016 Winter Youth Olympics =

- IOC code: CHN
- NOC: Chinese Olympic Committee
- Website: www.olympic.cn (in Chinese and English)

in Lillehammer
- Competitors: 23 in 7 sports
- Medals Ranked 7th: Gold 3 Silver 5 Bronze 2 Total 10

Winter Youth Olympics appearances (overview)
- 2012; 2016; 2020; 2024

China competed at the 2016 Winter Youth Olympics in Lillehammer, Norway from 12 to 21 February 2016.

== Medalists ==
Medal	Name	Sport	Event	Date
Gold	Li Yanzhe	Speed skating	Boys' 500 m	13 February
Gold	Zang Yize	Short track	Girls' 500 m	16 February
Gold	Meng Fanqi; Zhu Zhenyu	Biathlon	Single mixed relay	17 February
Silver	Han Mei	Speed skating	Girls' 500 m	13 February
Silver	Ma Wei	Short track	Boys' 1000 m	14 February
Silver	Han Mei	Speed skating	Girls' 1500 m	15 February
Silver	Chi Chunxue	Cross-country skiing	Girls' 5 km	18 February
Silver	Han Mei	Speed skating	Girls' mass start	19 February
Bronze	Li Huawei	Speed skating	Girls' 500 m	13 February
Bronze	Ma Wei	Short track	Boys' 500 m	16 February

=== Medalists in mixed NOCs events ===
Medal	Name	Sport	Event	Date
Gold	Shen Nanyang	Speed skating	Mixed team sprint	17 February
Gold	Li Xiangning	Figure skating	Team trophy	20 February
Silver	Han Yu	Curling	Mixed doubles	21 February
Bronze	Gao Yumeng; Li Bowen	Figure skating	Team trophy	20 February
Bronze	Zhao Ruiyi	Curling	Mixed doubles	21 February

== Biathlon ==
Boys

Athlete	Event	Time	Misses	Rank
Zhu Zhenyu	Sprint	21:33.1	3	32
Zhu Zhenyu	Pursuit	31:45.7	3	16

Girls

Athlete	Event	Time	Misses	Rank
Meng Fanqi	Sprint	19:14.0	1	9
Meng Fanqi	Pursuit	26:12.5	2	6

Mixed

Athletes	Event	Time	Misses	Rank
Meng Fanqi; Zhu Zhenyu	Single mixed relay	41:35.4	2+3	1st place, gold medalist(s)

== Cross-country skiing ==
Girls

Athlete	Event	Qualification		Quarterfinal		Semifinal		Final	
Athlete	Event	Time	Rank	Time	Rank	Time	Rank	Time	Rank
Chi Chunxue	5 km freestyle	—						13:29.9	2nd place, silver medalist(s)
Chi Chunxue	Classical sprint	3:40.94	19 Q	3:33.19	4	did not advance			
Chi Chunxue	Cross-country cross	3:47.85	15 Q	—		3:38.10	3 q	3:39.10	9

== Curling ==
=== Mixed team ===
Team

- Du Hongrui
- Han Yu
- Zhang Wenxin
- Zhao Ruiyi

Round Robin

Group A	Skip	W	L
United States	Luc Violette	6	1
Switzerland	Selina Witschonke	6	1
Russia	Nadezhda Karelina	6	1
Turkey	Oğuzhan Karakurt	3	4
Italy	Luca Rizzolli	3	4
China	Du Hongrui	2	5
New Zealand	Matthew Neilson	1	6
Japan	Kota Ito	1	6

Draw 1

Sheet D	1	2	3	4	5	6	7	8	Final
China (Du)	0	0	1	0	0	1	0	X	2
Switzerland (Witschonke)	1	1	0	3	1	0	1	X	7

Draw 2

Sheet B	1	2	3	4	5	6	7	8	Final
Turkey (Karakurt)	0	1	1	0	2	0	0	X	4
China (Du)	2	0	0	1	0	3	3	X	9

Draw 3

Sheet C	1	2	3	4	5	6	7	8	Final
China (Du)	0	0	2	1	0	1	0	X	4
Russia (Karelina)	2	0	0	0	2	0	2	X	6

Draw 4

Sheet B	1	2	3	4	5	6	7	8	Final
China (Du)	0	1	0	0	1	1	0	X	3
Italy (Rizzolli)	1	0	2	1	0	0	2	X	6

Draw 5

Sheet A	1	2	3	4	5	6	7	8	Final
China (Du)	1	0	0	1	1	0	0	X	3
Japan (Ito)	0	2	1	0	0	2	2	X	7

Draw 6

Sheet D	1	2	3	4	5	6	7	8	Final
United States (Violette)	2	1	1	0	0	1	0	X	5
China (Du)	0	0	0	1	0	0	1	X	2

Draw 7

Sheet A	1	2	3	4	5	6	7	8	Final
New Zealand (Neilson)	0	0	2	1	2	0	0	0	5
China (Du)	1	1	0	0	0	2	1	1	6

=== Mixed doubles ===
Athletes	Event	Round of 32	Round of 16	Quarterfinals	Semifinals	Final / BM	
Athletes	Event	Opposition Result	Opposition Result	Opposition Result	Opposition Result	Opposition Result	Rank
Han Yu (CHN); Ross Whyte (GBR)	Mixed doubles	Fay (CAN); Rocha (BRA); W 9 – 5	Oh (KOR); Esenboga (TUR); W 8 – 6	Witschonke (SUI); Gustsin (EST); W 6 – 5	Sasaki (JPN); Tardi (CAN); W 6 – 3	Matsuzawa (JPN); Hoesli (SUI); L 5 – 11	2nd place, silver medalist(s)
Zhao Ruiyi (CHN); Andreas Haarstad (NOR)	Mixed doubles	Engler (SUI); Santos (BRA); W 9 – 1	Lee (KOR); Nygren (SWE); W 11 – 6	Constantini (ITA); Kinnear (GBR); W 10 – 9	Matsuzawa (JPN); Hoesli (SUI); L 6 – 7	Sasaki (JPN); Tardi (CAN); W 10 – 1	3rd place, bronze medalist(s)
Jenny Jonasson (SWE); Du Hongrui (CHN)	Mixed doubles	Barros (BRA); Richardson (USA); L 4 – 8	did not advance				
Berivan Polat (TUR); Zhang Wenxin (CHN)	Mixed doubles	Rodriques (BRA); Doronin (RUS); W 9 – 5	Thompson (NZL); Middleton (CAN); L 2 – 9	did not advance			

== Figure skating ==
Singles

Athlete	Event	SP		FS		Total	
Athlete	Event	Points	Rank	Points	Rank	Points	Rank
Li Tangxu	Boys' singles	49.19	9	116.51	7	165.70	8
Lu Yunda	Boys' singles	44.20	13	93.06	11	137.26	12
Li Xiangning	Girls' singles	46.97	13	74.27	13	121.24	12

Couples

Athletes	Event	SP/SD		FS/FD		Total	
Athletes	Event	Points	Rank	Points	Rank	Points	Rank
Gao Yumeng; Li Bowen	Pairs	43.96	7	75.82	7	119.78	7
Zhao Ying; Xie Zhong	Pairs	45.84	6	93.22	4	139.06	5

Mixed NOC team trophy

Athletes	Event	Free skate/Free dance					
Athletes	Event	Ice dance	Pairs	Girls	Boys	Total	
Athletes	Event	Points Team points	Points Team points	Points Team points	Points Team points	Points	Rank
Team Desire; Anastasia Skoptsova / Kirill Aleshin (RUS); Sarah Rose / Joseph Goodpaster (USA); Li Xiangning (CHN); Dmitri Aliev (RUS)	Team trophy	80.28; 7	82.47; 4	88.73; 5	141.06; 7	23	1st place, gold medalist(s)
Team Discovery; Marjorie Lajoie / Zachary Lagha (CAN); Gao Yumeng / Li Bowen (CHN); Fruzsina Medgyesi (HUN); Deniss Vasiljevs (LAT)	Team trophy	73.78; 6	74.45; 3	71.26; 1	149.09; 8	18	3rd place, bronze medalist(s)
Team Focus; Maria Golubtsova / Kirill Belobrov (UKR); Zhao Ying / Xie Zhong (CHN); Yuna Shiraiwa (JPN); Lauri Lankila (FIN)	Team trophy	64.68; 4	92.74; 5	110.01; 8	61.57; 1	18	5

== Short track speed skating ==
Boys

Athlete	Event	Quarterfinal		Semifinal		Final	
Athlete	Event	Time	Rank	Time	Rank	Time	Rank
Ma Wei	500 m	42.208	1 SA/B	41.680	1 FA	42.129	3rd place, bronze medalist(s)
Ma Wei	1000 m	1:29.597	2 SA/B	1:27.200	1 FA	1:28.082	2nd place, silver medalist(s)

Girls

Athlete	Event	Quarterfinal		Semifinal		Final	
Athlete	Event	Time	Rank	Time	Rank	Time	Rank
Gong Li	500 m	45.397	1 SA/B	PEN		did not advance	
Gong Li	1000 m	1:37.783	3 FC	—		1:35.789	10
Zang Yize	500 m	45.106	1 SA/B	45.480	1 FA	46.648	1st place, gold medalist(s)
Zang Yize	1000 m	1:40.834	2 SA/B	1:36.550	3 FB	1:41.596	5

Mixed team relay

Athlete	Event	Semifinal		Final	
Athlete	Event	Time	Rank	Time	Rank
Team A April Shin (USA); Zang Yize (CHN); Pavel Sitnikov (RUS); Andras Sziklasi (HUN)	Mixed team relay	4:18.683	3 FB	4:25.169	6
Team D Gong Li (CHN); Lee Su-youn (KOR); Shaoang Liu (HUN); Yerkebulan Shamukhanov (KAZ)	Mixed team relay	PEN		did not advance	
Team H Shione Kaminaga (JPN); Gioya Lancee (NED); Moritz Kreuseler (GER); Ma Wei (CHN)	Mixed team relay	4:27.607	3 FB	4:22.198	4

Qualification Legend: FA=Final A (medal); FB=Final B (non-medal); FC=Final C (non-medal); FD=Final D (non-medal); SA/B=Semifinals A/B; SC/D=Semifinals C/D; ADV=Advanced to Next Round; PEN=Penalized

== Snowboarding ==
Halfpipe

Athlete	Event	Final				
Athlete	Event	Run 1	Run 2	Run 3	Best	Rank
Liu Xinyu	Boys' halfpipe	61.00	57.00	60.25	61.00	9
Wu Shaotong	Girls' halfpipe	74.75	27.75	21.50	74.75	5

== Speed skating ==
Boys

Athlete	Event	Race 1		Race 2		Final	
Athlete	Event	Time	Rank	Time	Rank	Time	Rank
Li Yanzhe	500 m	35.98	1	35.96	1	71.95	1st place, gold medalist(s)
Li Yanzhe	1500 m	—				1:56.24	11
Li Yanzhe	Mass start	—				5:53.73	12
Shen Hanyang	500 m	38.44	17	38.33	19	76.78	19
Shen Hanyang	1500 m	—				1:57.72	19
Shen Hanyang	Mass start	—				5:53.03	8

Girls

Athlete	Event	Race 1		Race 2		Final	
Athlete	Event	Time	Rank	Time	Rank	Time	Rank
Han Mei	500 m	39.78	2	39.66	2	79.44	2nd place, silver medalist(s)
Han Mei	1500 m	—				2:04.48	2nd place, silver medalist(s)
Han Mei	Mass start	—				20 pts	2nd place, silver medalist(s)
Li Huawei	500 m	39.97	3	39.77	3	79.75	3rd place, bronze medalist(s)
Li Huawei	1500 m	—				2:09.61	11
Li Huawei	Mass start	—				6:07.09	22

Mixed team sprint

Athletes	Event	Final	
Athletes	Event	Time	Rank
Team 2 Mariya Gromova (KAZ); Han Mei (CHN); Mathias Hauer (AUT); Victor Rudenko (BLR)	Mixed team sprint	2:00.79	10
Team 3 Viola Feichtner (AUT); Li Huawei (CHN); Li Yanzhe (CHN); Kazuki Sakakibara (JPN)	Mixed team sprint	1:59.20	6
Team 6 Noemi Bonazza (ITA); Sumiya Buyantogtokh (MGL); Chung Jae-woong (KOR); Shen Manyang (CHN)	Mixed team sprint	1:57.85	1st place, gold medalist(s)

== See also ==
- China at the 2016 Summer Olympics
