= Czech Republic at the 2016 Winter Youth Olympics =

- IOC code: CZE
- NOC: Czech Olympic Committee
- Website: www.olympic.cz

in Lillehammer
- Competitors: 43 in 12 sports
- Flag bearer: Magdalena Erbenová
- Medals Ranked 20th: Gold 0 Silver 2 Bronze 2 Total 4

Winter Youth Olympics appearances (overview)
- 2012; 2016; 2020; 2024

Czech Republic competed at the 2016 Winter Youth Olympics in Lillehammer, Norway from 12 to 21 February 2016.

== Medalists ==
Medal	Name	Sport	Event	Date
Silver	Anna Dušková; Martin Bidař	Figure skating	Pair	15 February
Silver	Czech Republic women's national under-16 ice hockey team: Kristýna Bláhová; Nikola Dýcková; Magdalena Erbenová; Martina Exnerová; Alexandra Halounová; Sandra Halounová; Karolína Hornická; Karolína Hrdinová; Klára Jandušíková; Karolína Juřicová; Anna Kotounová; Šárka Krejníková; Laura Lerchová; Veronika Lorencová; Barbora Machalová; Natálie Mlýnková; Adéla Škrdlová	Ice hockey	Girls' tournament	21 February
Bronze	Klára Kašparová	Freestyle skiing	Girls' ski cross	15 February
Bronze	Ondřej Pažout	Nordic combined	Normal hill/5 km	16 February

=== Medalists in mixed NOCs events ===
Medal 1	Name	Sport	Event	Date
Silver	Anna Dušková; Martin Bidař	Figure skating	Team trophy	20 February

== Alpine skiing ==
Boys

Athlete	Event	Run 1		Run 2		Total	
Athlete	Event	Time	Rank	Time	Rank	Time	Rank
Jan Zabystřan	Slalom	DNF		did not advance			
Jan Zabystřan	Giant slalom	1:20.55	18	1:18.71	7	2:39.26	8
Jan Zabystřan	Super-G	—				1:12.16	12
Jan Zabystřan	Combined	1:13.36	17	41.25	4	1:54.61	6

Girls

Athlete	Event	Run 1		Run 2		Total	
Athlete	Event	Time	Rank	Time	Rank	Time	Rank
Andrea Arnold	Slalom	1:02.76	25	57.45	22	2:00.21	22
Andrea Arnold	Giant slalom	1:24.40	21	1:22.58	23	2:46.98	22
Andrea Arnold	Super-G	—				1:16.68	18
Andrea Arnold	Combined	1:18.21	21	did not finish			

Parallel mixed team

Athletes	Event	Round of 16	Quarterfinals	Semifinals	Final / BM	
Athletes	Event	Opposition Score	Opposition Score	Opposition Score	Opposition Score	Rank
Andrea Arnold; Jan Zabystřan	Parallel mixed team	Norway; L 2 – 2^{+}	did not advance			

== Biathlon ==
Boys

Athlete	Event	Time	Misses	Rank
Vítězslav Hornig	Sprint	20:31.4	2	14
Vítězslav Hornig	Pursuit	32:48.0	7	22
Jakub Štvrtecký	Sprint	20:36.0	3	16
Jakub Štvrtecký	Pursuit	31:21.9	6	13

Girls

Athlete	Event	Time	Misses	Rank
Petra Suchá	Sprint	19:53.6	2	19
Petra Suchá	Pursuit	27:32.2	4	17
Tereza Vinklárková	Sprint	19:36.5	2	14
Tereza Vinklárková	Pursuit	27:26.0	5	16

Mixed

Athletes	Event	Time	Misses	Rank
Tereza Vinklárková; Jakub Štvrtecký	Single mixed relay	43:34.0	3+16	12
Tereza Vinklárková; Petra Suchá; Vítězslav Hornig; Jakub Štvrtecký	Mixed relay	1:25:20.2	4+16	9

== Cross-country skiing ==
Boys

Athlete	Event	Qualification		Quarterfinal		Semifinal		Final	
Athlete	Event	Time	Rank	Time	Rank	Time	Rank	Time	Rank
Adam Matouš	10 km freestyle	—						25:33.1	14
Adam Matouš	Classical sprint	3:04.51	9 Q	3:04.65	2 Q	3:05.04	6	did not advance	
Adam Matouš	Cross-country cross	3:16.02	18 Q	—		3:11.90	8	did not advance	

Girls

Athlete	Event	Qualification		Quarterfinal		Semifinal		Final	
Athlete	Event	Time	Rank	Time	Rank	Time	Rank	Time	Rank
Barbora Havlíčková	5 km freestyle	—						13:40.9	7
Barbora Havlíčková	Classical sprint	3:39.89	17 Q	3:36.45	4	did not advance			
Barbora Havlíčková	Cross-country cross	3:43.60	8 Q	—		3:36.59	4 q	3:38.87	8

== Curling ==
=== Mixed team ===
Team

- Martin Blahovec
- Andrea Krupanská
- Pavel Mareš
- Kristina Podrábská

Round Robin

Group B	Skip	W	L
Canada	Mary Fay	7	0
Great Britain	Ross Whyte	6	1
Sweden	Johan Nygren	5	2
Norway	Maia Ramsfjell	4	3
South Korea	Hong Yun-jeong	3	4
Czech Republic	Pavel Mareš	2	5
Estonia	Eiko-Siim Peips	1	6
Brazil	Victor Santos	0	7

Draw 1

Sheet A	1	2	3	4	5	6	7	8	Final
Brazil (Santos)	0	0	0	0	0	0	X	X	0
Czech Republic (Mareš)	6	2	2	5	2	2	X	X	19

Draw 2

Sheet C	1	2	3	4	5	6	7	8	Final
Czech Republic (Mareš)	1	0	0	1	0	1	X	X	3
Norway (Ramsfjell)	0	2	2	0	6	0	X	X	10

Draw 3

Sheet D	1	2	3	4	5	6	7	8	Final
Czech Republic (Mareš)	1	0	0	1	0	0	0	X	2
Canada (Fay)	0	2	0	0	2	0	1	X	5

Draw 4

Sheet B	1	2	3	4	5	6	7	8	Final
South Korea (Hong)	0	2	2	0	1	2	0	X	7
Czech Republic (Mareš)	2	0	0	0	0	0	1	X	3

Draw 5

Sheet D	1	2	3	4	5	6	7	8	Final
Estonia (Peips)	0	1	1	0	1	0	1	0	4
Czech Republic (Mareš)	3	0	0	2	0	2	0	1	8

Draw 6

Sheet A	1	2	3	4	5	6	7	8	9	Final
Czech Republic (Mareš)	0	2	0	0	0	0	1	1	0	4
Sweden (Nygren)	2	0	0	1	0	1	0	0	1	5

Draw 7

Sheet C	1	2	3	4	5	6	7	8	Final
Great Britain (Whyte)	0	0	4	4	0	1	X	X	9
Czech Republic (Mareš)	1	1	0	0	1	0	X	X	3

=== Mixed doubles ===
Athletes	Event	Round of 32	Round of 16	Quarterfinals	Semifinals	Final / BM	
Athletes	Event	Opposition Result	Opposition Result	Opposition Result	Opposition Result	Opposition Result	Rank
Kristina Podrábská (CZE); Anton Degerfeldt (SWE)	Mixed doubles	Flannery (USA); Ito (JPN); W 8 – 7	Witschonke (SUI); Gustsin (EST); L 1 – 11	did not advance			
Andrea Krupanská (CZE); Oğuzhan Karakurt (TUR)	Mixed doubles	Karelina (RUS); Aita (JPN); L 2 – 8	did not advance				
Amy Bryce (GBR); Martin Blahovec (CZE)	Mixed doubles	Sasaki (JPN); Tardi (CAN); L 1 – 12	did not advance				
Eline Mjøen (NOR); Pavel Mareš (CZE)	Mixed doubles	Matsuzawa (JPN); Hösli (SUI); L 6 – 9	did not advance				

== Figure skating ==
Couples

Athletes	Event	SP/SD		FS/FD		Total	
Athletes	Event	Points	Rank	Points	Rank	Points	Rank
Anna Dušková; Martin Bidař	Pairs	61.82	1	104.31	2	166.13	2nd place, silver medalist(s)

Mixed NOC team trophy

Athletes	Event	Free skate/Free dance					
Athletes	Event	Ice dance	Pairs	Girls	Boys	Total	
Athletes	Event	Points Team points	Points Team points	Points Team points	Points Team points	Points	Rank
Team Future; Julia Wagret / Mathieu Couyras (FRA); Anna Dušková / Martin Bidař (CZE); Diāna Ņikitina (LAT); Ivan Shmuratko (UKR)	Team trophy	63.06; 3	103.91; 7	107.47; 7	89.66; 3	20	2nd place, silver medalist(s)

== Freestyle skiing ==
Ski cross

Athlete	Event	Qualification		Group heats		Semifinal	Final
Athlete	Event	Time	Rank	Points	Rank	Position	Position
Klára Kašparová	Girls' ski cross	45.48	1	14	7 Q	2 FA	3rd place, bronze medalist(s)

== Ice hockey ==
=== Girls' tournament ===
Roster

- Kristýna Bláhová
- Nikola Dýcková
- Magdalena Erbenová
- Martina Exnerova
- Alexandra Halounová
- Sandra Halounová
- Karolina Hornická
- Karolina Kotounová
- Klára Jandušíková
- Karolina Juricova
- Anna Kotounova
- Šárka Krejníková
- Laura Lerchová
- Veronika Lorencová
- Barbora Machalová
- Natálie Mlýnková
- Adéla Škrdlová

Group Stage

Pos	Team	Pld	W	OTW	OTL	L	GF	GA	GD	Pts	Qualification
1	Sweden	4	2	1	1	0	10	3	+7	9	Advance to semifinals
2	Czech Republic	4	3	0	0	1	7	4	+3	9	Advance to semifinals
3	Switzerland	4	2	1	0	1	10	6	+4	8	Advance to semifinals
4	Slovakia	4	1	0	1	2	6	9	−3	4	Advance to semifinals
5	Norway	4	0	0	0	4	2	13	−11	0	

Updated to match(es) played on 19 February 2016. Source: IIHF.com

13 February 2016; 17:00	Czech Republic	2–1 (1–1, 1–0, 0–0)	Slovakia	Kristins Hall

14 February 2016; 17:00	Norway	0–3 (0–0, 0–3, 0–0)	Czech Republic	Kristins Hall

16 February 2016; 14:00	Czech Republic	0–2 (0–0, 0–1, 0–1)	Sweden	Youth Hall

18 February 2016; 14:00	Switzerland	1–2 (1–1, 0–0, 0–1)	Czech Republic	Youth Hall

Semifinals

19 February 2016; 14:00	Czech Republic	2–1 (1–0, 0–1, 0–0, 0–0, 1–0)	Switzerland	Youth Hall

Gold medal game

21 February 2016; 11:00	Sweden	3–1 (1–1, 2–0, 0–0)	Czech Republic	Kristins Hall

Final Rank: (silver)

== Luge ==
Individual sleds

Athlete	Event	Run 1		Run 2		Total	
Athlete	Event	Time	Rank	Time	Rank	Time	Rank
Michael Lejsek	Boys	49.676	16	49.992	18	1:39.668	17
Michaela Maršíková	Girls	53.899	12	53.894	13	1:47.793	13
Zdeněk Pěkný; Filip Vejdělek	Doubles	54.371	11	54.608	12	1:48.979	12

Mixed team relay

Athlete	Event	Girls		Boys		Doubles		Total	
Athlete	Event	Time	Rank	Time	Rank	Time	Rank	Time	Rank
Michaela Maršíková; Michael Lejsek; Filip Vejdělek; Zdeněk Pěkný	Team relay	Disqualified							

== Nordic combined ==
Individual

Athlete	Event	Ski jumping				Cross-country	
Athlete	Event	Distance	Points	Rank	Deficit	Time	Rank
Ondřej Pažout	Normal hill/5 km	98.0	127.0	3	0:19	13:39.3	3rd place, bronze medalist(s)

Nordic mixed team

Athlete	Event	Ski jumping			Cross-country	
Athlete	Event	Points	Rank	Deficit	Time	Rank
Zdeňka Pešatová; Ondřej Pažout; František Holík; Barbora Havlíčková; Adam Matouš	Nordic mixed team	343.4	5	0:43	did not start	

== Ski jumping ==
Individual

Athlete	Event	First round			Final			Total	
Athlete	Event	Distance	Points	Rank	Distance	Points	Rank	Points	Rank
František Holík	Boys' normal hill	87.5	104.5	10	88.5	104.2	8	208.7	10
Zdeňka Pešatová	Girls' normal hill	85.0	94.7	6	80.0	82.0	10	176.7	10

Team

Athlete	Event	First round		Final		Total	
Athlete	Event	Points	Rank	Points	Rank	Points	Rank
Zdeňka Pešatová; Ondřej Pažout; František Holík	Team competition	306.2	7	284.5	9	590.7	7

== Snowboarding ==
Halfpipe

Athlete	Event	Final				
Athlete	Event	Run 1	Run 2	Run 3	Best	Rank
Daniel Kaspar	Boys' halfpipe	33.50	44.25	47.75	47.75	14

Snowboard cross

Athlete	Event	Qualification		Group heats		Semifinal	Final
Athlete	Event	Time	Rank	Points	Rank	Position	Position
Matouš Koudelka	Boys' snowboard cross	49.35	9 Q	9	11	did not advance	
Sára Veselková	Girls' snowboard cross	54.41	12 Q	12	10	did not advance	

Snowboard and ski cross relay

Athlete	Event	Quarterfinal	Semifinal	Final
Athlete	Event	Position	Position	Position
Sára Veselková (CZE); Klára Kašparová (CZE); Matouš Koudelka (CZE); Fernando Soto Herrera (MEX)	Team snowboard ski cross	DNF	did not advance	

Qualification legend: FA – Qualify to medal round; FB – Qualify to consolation round

== Speed skating ==
Girls

Athlete	Event	Final	
Athlete	Event	Time	Rank
Natálie Kerschbaummayr	1500 m	2:05.54	4
Natálie Kerschbaummayr	Mass start	5:54.50	7

Mixed team sprint

Athletes	Event	Final	
Athletes	Event	Time	Rank
Team 8 Natálie Kerschbaummayr (CZE); Moe Kumagai (JPN); Dmitrii Filimonov (RUS); Kaspar Kaljuvee (EST)	Mixed team sprint	DSQ	

== See also ==
- Czech Republic at the 2016 Summer Olympics
