= Curling at the 2016 Winter Youth Olympics – Mixed doubles =

Curling – Mixed doubles at the II Winter Youth Olympic Games
- Venue: Kristins Hall
- Dates: February 19–21, 2016

Medalists
| 1st place, gold medalist(s) | | Yako Matsuzawa (JPN); Philipp Hösli (SUI) | Mixed-NOCs |
| 2nd place, silver medalist(s) | | Han Yu (CHN); Ross Whyte (GBR) | Mixed-NOCs |
| 3rd place, bronze medalist(s) | | Zhao Ruiyi (CHN); Andreas Hårstad (NOR) | Mixed-NOCs |

Mixed doubles curling at the 2016 Winter Youth Olympics was held from February 19 to 21 at Kristins Hall in Lillehammer, Norway.

== Teams ==
The teams will consist of athletes from the mixed team tournament, one boy and one girl from different NOCs. The teams will be selected by the organizing committee based on the final ranking from the mixed team competition in a way that balances out the teams, and will be assigned on February 17. The players in each pair will then be allowed time to train together.

Teams
| Female: Honoka Sasaki (JPN) Male: Tyler Tardi (CAN) | Female: Amy Bryce (GBR) Male: Martin Blahovec (CZE) | Female: Beyzanur Konuksever (TUR) Male: Luca Rizzolli (ITA) | Female: Kristin Laidsalu (EST) Male: Sergey Maksimov (RUS) |
| Female: Courtney Smith (NZL) Male: Henwy Lochmann (SUI) | Female: Maia Ramsfjell (NOR) Male: Kim Ho-geon (KOR) | Female: Jenny Jonasson (SWE) Male: Du Hongrui (CHN) | Female: Giovanna Barros (BRA) Male: Ben Richardson (USA) |
| Female: Mary Fay (CAN) Male: Elian Rocha (BRA) | Female: Han Yu (CHN) Male: Ross Whyte (GBR) | Female: Oh Su-yun (KOR) Male: Tunç Esenboga (TUR) | Female: Mariia Arkhipova (RUS) Male: Matthew Neilson (NZL) |
| Female: Selina Witschonke (SUI) Male: Jarl Guštšin (EST) | Female: Martina Ghezze (ITA) Male: Michael Mellemseter (NOR) | Female: Kristina Podrábská (CZE) Male: Anton Degerfeldt (SWE) | Female: Cait Flannery (USA) Male: Kota Ito (JPN) |
| Female: Karlee Burgess (CAN) Male: Eiko-Siim Peips (EST) | Female: Stefania Constantini (ITA) Male: Callum Kinnear (GBR) | Female: Andrea Krupanská (CZE) Male: Oğuzhan Karakurt (TUR) | Female: Nadezhda Karelina (RUS) Male: Kosuke Aita (JPN) |
| Female: Laura Engler (SUI) Male: Victor Santos (BRA) | Female: Zhao Ruiyi (CHN) Male: Andreas Hårstad (NOR) | Female: Lee Ji-young (KOR) Male: Johan Nygren (SWE) | Female: Cora Farrell (USA) Male: Ben Smith (NZL) |
| Female: Holly Thompson (NZL) Male: Sterling Middleton (CAN) | Female: Mili Smith (GBR) Male: Hong Yun-jeong (KOR) | Female: Berivan Polat (TUR) Male: Zhang Wenxin (CHN) | Female: Raissa Rodrigues (BRA) Male: German Doronin (RUS) |
| Female: Yako Matsuzawa (JPN) Male: Philipp Hösli (SUI) | Female: Eline Mjøen (NOR) Male: Pavel Mareš (CZE) | Female: Tova Pettersson (SWE) Male: Alberto Zisa (ITA) | Female: Britta Sillaots (EST) Male: Luc Violette (USA) |

== Knockout Draw Bracket ==
=== Finals ===
Semifinals
Honoka Sasaki (JPN); Tyler Tardi (CAN) | 3
Han Yu (CHN); Ross Whyte (GBR) | 6
Zhao Ruiyi (CHN); Andreas Hårstad (NOR) | 6
Yako Matsuzawa (JPN); Philipp Hösli (SUI) | 7

Gold Medal Game
Han Yu (CHN); Ross Whyte (GBR) | 5
Yako Matsuzawa (JPN); Philipp Hösli (SUI) | 11

| Bronze Medal Game |
| Honoka Sasaki (JPN); Tyler Tardi (CAN) | 1 |
| Zhao Ruiyi (CHN); Andreas Hårstad (NOR) | 10 |

=== Top half ===
Round of 32
Honoka Sasaki (JPN); Tyler Tardi (CAN) | 12
Amy Bryce (GBR); Martin Blahovec (CZE) | 1
Beyzanur Konuksever (TUR); Luca Rizzolli (ITA) | 4
Kristin Laidsalu (EST); Sergey Maksimov (RUS) | 5
Courtney Smith (NZL); Henwy Lochmann (SUI) | 4
Maia Ramsfjell (NOR); Kim Ho-geon (KOR) | 10
Jenny Jonasson (SWE); Du Hongrui (CHN) | 4
Giovanna Barros (BRA); Ben Richardson (USA) | 8
Mary Fay (CAN); Elian Rocha (BRA) | 5
Han Yu (CHN); Ross Whyte (GBR) | 9
Oh Su-yun (KOR); Tunç Esenboga (TUR) | 11
Mariia Arkhipova (RUS); Matthew Neilson (NZL) | 4
Selina Witschonke (SUI); Jarl Guštšin (EST) | 9
Martina Ghezze (ITA); Michael Mellemseter (NOR) | 3
Kristina Podrábská (CZE); Anton Degerfeldt (SWE) | 8
Cait Flannery (USA); Kota Ito (JPN) | 7

Round of 16
Honoka Sasaki (JPN); Tyler Tardi (CAN) | 6
Kristin Laidsalu (EST); Sergey Maksimov (RUS) | 2
Maia Ramsfjell (NOR); Kim Ho-geon (KOR) | 9
Giovanna Barros (BRA); Ben Richardson (USA) | 7
Han Yu (CHN); Ross Whyte (GBR) | 8
Oh Su-yun (KOR); Tunç Esenboga (TUR) | 6
Selina Witschonke (SUI); Jarl Guštšin (EST) | 11
Kristina Podrábská (CZE); Anton Degerfeldt (SWE) | 1

Quarterfinals
Honoka Sasaki (JPN); Tyler Tardi (CAN) | 7
Maia Ramsfjell (NOR); Kim Ho-geon (KOR) | 5
Han Yu (CHN); Ross Whyte (GBR) | 6
Selina Witschonke (SUI); Jarl Guštšin (EST) | 5

Semifinals
Honoka Sasaki (JPN); Tyler Tardi (CAN) | 3
Han Yu (CHN); Ross Whyte (GBR) | 6

=== Bottom half ===
Round of 32
Karlee Burgess (CAN); Eiko-Siim Peips (EST) | 1
Stefania Constantini (ITA); Callum Kinnear (GBR) | 9
Andrea Krupanská (CZE); Oğuzhan Karakurt (TUR) | 2
Nadezhda Karelina (RUS); Kosuke Aita (JPN) | 8
Laura Engler (SUI); Victor Santos (BRA) | 1
Zhao Ruiyi (CHN); Andreas Hårstad (NOR) | 9
Lee Ji-young (KOR); Johan Nygren (SWE) | 8
Cora Farrell (USA); Ben Smith (NZL) | 1
Holly Thompson (NZL); Sterling Middleton (CAN) | 8
Mili Smith (GBR); Hong Yun-jeong (KOR) | 2
Berivan Polat (TUR); Zhang Wenxin (CHN) | 9
Raissa Rodrigues (BRA); German Doronin (RUS) | 5
Yako Matsuzawa (JPN); Philipp Hösli (SUI) | 9
Eline Mjøen (NOR); Pavel Mareš (CZE) | 6
Tova Pettersson (SWE); Alberto Zisa (ITA) | 4
Britta Sillaots (EST); Luc Violette (USA) | 7

Round of 16
Stefania Constantini (ITA); Callum Kinnear (GBR) | 7
Nadezhda Karelina (RUS); Kosuke Aita (JPN) | 3
Zhao Ruiyi (CHN); Andreas Hårstad (NOR) | 8
Lee Ji-young (KOR); Johan Nygren (SWE) | 6
Holly Thompson (NZL); Sterling Middleton (CAN) | 9
Berivan Polat (TUR); Zhang Wenxin (CHN) | 2
Yako Matsuzawa (JPN); Philipp Hösli (SUI) | 10
Britta Sillaots (EST); Luc Violette (USA) | 5

Quarterfinals
Stefania Constantini (ITA); Callum Kinnear (GBR) | 9
Zhao Ruiyi (CHN); Andreas Hårstad (NOR) | 10
Holly Thompson (NZL); Sterling Middleton (CAN) | 1
Yako Matsuzawa (JPN); Philipp Hösli (SUI) | 11

Semifinals
Zhao Ruiyi (CHN); Andreas Hårstad (NOR) | 6
Yako Matsuzawa (JPN); Philipp Hösli (SUI) | 7

== Knockout results ==
All draw times are listed in Central European Time (UTC+01).

=== Round of 32 ===
==== Draw 1 ====
Friday, February 19, 9:00

| Sheet A | 1 | 2 | 3 | 4 | 5 | 6 | 7 | 8 | Final |
| Honoka Sasaki (JPN); Tyler Tardi (CAN) | 2 | 3 | 2 | 3 | 2 | 0 | X | X | 12 |
| Amy Bryce (GBR); Martin Blahovec (CZE) | 0 | 0 | 0 | 0 | 0 | 1 | X | X | 1 |

| Sheet B | 1 | 2 | 3 | 4 | 5 | 6 | 7 | 8 | Final |
| Beyzanur Konuksever (TUR); Luca Rizzolli (ITA) | 0 | 1 | 0 | 0 | 1 | 1 | 0 | 1 | 4 |
| Kristin Laidsalu (EST); Sergey Maksimov (RUS) | 2 | 0 | 1 | 1 | 0 | 0 | 1 | 0 | 5 |

| Sheet C | 1 | 2 | 3 | 4 | 5 | 6 | 7 | 8 | Final |
| Selina Witschonke (SUI); Jarl Guštšin (EST) | 3 | 1 | 1 | 0 | 2 | 2 | 0 | X | 9 |
| Martina Ghezze (ITA); Michael Mellemseter (NOR) | 0 | 0 | 0 | 2 | 0 | 0 | 1 | X | 3 |

| Sheet D | 1 | 2 | 3 | 4 | 5 | 6 | 7 | 8 | Final |
| Jenny Jonasson (SWE); Du Hongrui (CHN) | 0 | 0 | 0 | 3 | 0 | 0 | 1 | X | 4 |
| Giovanna Barros (BRA); Ben Richardson (USA) | 2 | 1 | 1 | 0 | 2 | 2 | 0 | X | 8 |

==== Draw 2 ====
Friday, February 19, 12:30

| Sheet A | 1 | 2 | 3 | 4 | 5 | 6 | 7 | 8 | Final |
| Mary Fay (CAN); Elian Rocha (BRA) | 0 | 1 | 0 | 1 | 1 | 0 | 2 | X | 5 |
| Han Yu (CHN); Ross Whyte (GBR) | 4 | 0 | 3 | 0 | 0 | 2 | 0 | X | 9 |

| Sheet B | 1 | 2 | 3 | 4 | 5 | 6 | 7 | 8 | Final |
| Oh Su-yun (KOR); Tunç Esenboga (TUR) | 0 | 3 | 1 | 0 | 2 | 2 | 1 | 2 | 11 |
| Mariia Arkhipova (RUS); Matthew Neilson (NZL) | 3 | 0 | 0 | 1 | 0 | 0 | 0 | 0 | 4 |

| Sheet C | 1 | 2 | 3 | 4 | 5 | 6 | 7 | 8 | Final |
| Courtney Smith (NZL); Henwy Lochmann (SUI) | 0 | 1 | 2 | 0 | 0 | 0 | 1 | X | 4 |
| Maia Ramsfjell (NOR); Kim Ho-geon (KOR) | 3 | 0 | 0 | 1 | 3 | 3 | 0 | X | 10 |

| Sheet D | 1 | 2 | 3 | 4 | 5 | 6 | 7 | 8 | Final |
| Kristina Podrábská (CZE); Anton Degerfeldt (SWE) | 2 | 1 | 1 | 0 | 1 | 1 | 0 | 2 | 8 |
| Cait Flannery (USA); Kota Ito (JPN) | 0 | 0 | 0 | 4 | 0 | 0 | 3 | 0 | 7 |

==== Draw 3 ====
Friday, February 19, 16:00

| Sheet A | 1 | 2 | 3 | 4 | 5 | 6 | 7 | 8 | Final |
| Karlee Burgess (CAN); Eiko-Siim Peips (EST) | 1 | 0 | 0 | 0 | 0 | 0 | 0 | X | 1 |
| Stefania Constantini (ITA); Callum Kinnear (GBR) | 0 | 1 | 2 | 1 | 2 | 1 | 2 | X | 9 |

| Sheet B | 1 | 2 | 3 | 4 | 5 | 6 | 7 | 8 | Final |
| Andrea Krupanská (CZE); Oğuzhan Karakurt (TUR) | 2 | 0 | 0 | 0 | 0 | 0 | 0 | X | 2 |
| Nadezhda Karelina (RUS); Kosuke Aita (JPN) | 0 | 2 | 1 | 2 | 1 | 1 | 1 | X | 8 |

| Sheet C | 1 | 2 | 3 | 4 | 5 | 6 | 7 | 8 | Final |
| Laura Engler (SUI); Victor Santos (BRA) | 1 | 0 | 0 | 0 | 0 | 0 | 0 | X | 1 |
| Zhao Ruiyi (CHN); Andreas Hårstad (NOR) | 0 | 1 | 4 | 2 | 1 | 1 | X | X | 9 |

| Sheet D | 1 | 2 | 3 | 4 | 5 | 6 | 7 | 8 | Final |
| Lee Ji-young (KOR); Johan Nygren (SWE) | 2 | 1 | 1 | 1 | 3 | 0 | X | X | 8 |
| Cora Farrell (USA); Ben Smith (NZL) | 0 | 0 | 0 | 0 | 0 | 1 | X | X | 1 |

==== Draw 4 ====
Friday, February 19, 19:30

| Sheet A | 1 | 2 | 3 | 4 | 5 | 6 | 7 | 8 | Final |
| Holly Thompson (NZL); Sterling Middleton (CAN) | 2 | 0 | 1 | 1 | 3 | 1 | X | X | 8 |
| Mili Smith (GBR); Hong Yun-jeong (KOR) | 0 | 2 | 0 | 0 | 0 | 0 | X | X | 2 |

| Sheet B | 1 | 2 | 3 | 4 | 5 | 6 | 7 | 8 | Final |
| Berivan Polat (TUR); Zhang Wenxin (CHN) | 2 | 1 | 0 | 2 | 0 | 0 | 0 | 4 | 9 |
| Raissa Rodrigues (BRA); German Doronin (RUS) | 0 | 0 | 1 | 0 | 1 | 2 | 1 | 0 | 5 |

| Sheet C | 1 | 2 | 3 | 4 | 5 | 6 | 7 | 8 | Final |
| Yako Matsuzawa (JPN); Philipp Hösli (SUI) | 0 | 5 | 1 | 1 | 1 | 0 | 1 | 0 | 9 |
| Eline Mjøen (NOR); Pavel Mareš (CZE) | 2 | 0 | 0 | 0 | 0 | 3 | 0 | 1 | 6 |

| Sheet D | 1 | 2 | 3 | 4 | 5 | 6 | 7 | 8 | Final |
| Tova Pettersson (SWE); Alberto Zisa (ITA) | 1 | 0 | 2 | 1 | 0 | 0 | 0 | X | 4 |
| Britta Sillaots (EST); Luc Violette (USA) | 0 | 3 | 0 | 0 | 1 | 1 | 2 | X | 7 |

=== Round of 16 ===
==== Draw 1 ====
Saturday, February 20, 9:00

| Sheet A | 1 | 2 | 3 | 4 | 5 | 6 | 7 | 8 | Final |
| Selina Witschonke (SUI); Jarl Guštšin (EST) | 2 | 3 | 2 | 0 | 3 | 1 | X | X | 11 |
| Kristina Podrábská (CZE); Anton Degerfeldt (SWE) | 0 | 0 | 0 | 1 | 0 | 0 | X | X | 1 |

| Sheet B | 1 | 2 | 3 | 4 | 5 | 6 | 7 | 8 | Final |
| Zhao Ruiyi (CHN); Andreas Hårstad (NOR) | 2 | 0 | 5 | 0 | 3 | 0 | 1 | X | 11 |
| Lee Ji-young (KOR); Johan Nygren (SWE) | 0 | 3 | 0 | 2 | 0 | 1 | 0 | X | 6 |

| Sheet C | 1 | 2 | 3 | 4 | 5 | 6 | 7 | 8 | Final |
| Han Yu (CHN); Ross Whyte (GBR) | 2 | 0 | 0 | 1 | 0 | 4 | 1 | 0 | 8 |
| Oh Su-yun (KOR); Tunç Esenboga (TUR) | 0 | 3 | 1 | 0 | 1 | 0 | 0 | 1 | 6 |

| Sheet D | 1 | 2 | 3 | 4 | 5 | 6 | 7 | 8 | Final |
| Stefania Constantini (ITA); Callum Kinnear (GBR) | 0 | 1 | 1 | 0 | 1 | 1 | 2 | 1 | 7 |
| Nadezhda Karelina (RUS); Kosuke Aita (JPN) | 1 | 0 | 0 | 2 | 0 | 0 | 0 | 0 | 3 |

==== Draw 2 ====
Saturday, February 20, 13:00

| Sheet A | 1 | 2 | 3 | 4 | 5 | 6 | 7 | 8 | Final |
| Maia Ramsfjell (NOR); Kim Ho-geon (KOR) | 0 | 0 | 4 | 1 | 0 | 2 | 2 | X | 9 |
| Giovanna Barros (BRA); Ben Richardson (USA) | 1 | 2 | 0 | 0 | 4 | 0 | 0 | X | 7 |

| Sheet B | 1 | 2 | 3 | 4 | 5 | 6 | 7 | 8 | Final |
| Yako Matsuzawa (JPN); Philipp Hösli (SUI) | 0 | 1 | 0 | 0 | 4 | 0 | 5 | X | 10 |
| Britta Sillaots (EST); Luc Violette (USA) | 1 | 0 | 0 | 1 | 0 | 3 | 0 | X | 5 |

| Sheet C | 1 | 2 | 3 | 4 | 5 | 6 | 7 | 8 | Final |
| Honoka Sasaki (JPN); Tyler Tardi (CAN) | 1 | 1 | 2 | 1 | 0 | 1 | 0 | X | 6 |
| Kristin Laidsalu (EST); Sergey Maksimov (RUS) | 0 | 0 | 0 | 0 | 1 | 0 | 1 | X | 2 |

| Sheet D | 1 | 2 | 3 | 4 | 5 | 6 | 7 | 8 | Final |
| Holly Thompson (NZL); Sterling Middleton (CAN) | 2 | 0 | 3 | 1 | 1 | 0 | 2 | X | 9 |
| Berivan Polat (TUR); Zhang Wenxin (CHN) | 0 | 1 | 0 | 0 | 0 | 1 | 0 | X | 2 |

=== Quarterfinals ===
Saturday, February 20, 17:00

| Sheet A | 1 | 2 | 3 | 4 | 5 | 6 | 7 | 8 | Final |
| Zhao Ruiyi (CHN); Andreas Hårstad (NOR) | 0 | 2 | 2 | 0 | 4 | 1 | 0 | 1 | 10 |
| Stefania Constantini (ITA); Callum Kinnear (GBR) | 3 | 0 | 0 | 2 | 0 | 0 | 4 | 0 | 9 |

| Sheet B | 1 | 2 | 3 | 4 | 5 | 6 | 7 | 8 | Final |
| Honoka Sasaki (JPN); Tyler Tardi (CAN) | 0 | 0 | 4 | 0 | 0 | 1 | 0 | 2 | 7 |
| Maia Ramsfjell (NOR); Kim Ho-geon (KOR) | 1 | 1 | 0 | 1 | 1 | 0 | 1 | 0 | 5 |

| Sheet C | 1 | 2 | 3 | 4 | 5 | 6 | 7 | 8 | Final |
| Holly Thompson (NZL); Sterling Middleton (CAN) | 0 | 0 | 1 | 0 | 0 | 0 | X | X | 1 |
| Yako Matsuzawa (JPN); Philipp Hösli (SUI) | 4 | 1 | 0 | 1 | 1 | 4 | X | X | 11 |

| Sheet D | 1 | 2 | 3 | 4 | 5 | 6 | 7 | 8 | Final |
| Han Yu (CHN); Ross Whyte (GBR) | 1 | 2 | 0 | 2 | 0 | 0 | 1 | 0 | 6 |
| Selina Witschonke (SUI); Jarl Guštšin (EST) | 0 | 0 | 1 | 0 | 1 | 2 | 0 | 1 | 5 |

=== Semifinals ===
Sunday, February 21, 9:00

| Sheet A | 1 | 2 | 3 | 4 | 5 | 6 | 7 | 8 | Final |
| Honoka Sasaki (JPN); Tyler Tardi (CAN) | 1 | 0 | 0 | 1 | 0 | 0 | 1 | X | 3 |
| Han Yu (CHN); Ross Whyte (GBR) | 0 | 1 | 1 | 0 | 3 | 1 | 0 | X | 6 |

| Sheet D | 1 | 2 | 3 | 4 | 5 | 6 | 7 | 8 | Final |
| Zhao Ruiyi (CHN); Andreas Hårstad (NOR) | 0 | 1 | 0 | 1 | 0 | 2 | 2 | 0 | 6 |
| Yako Matsuzawa (JPN); Philipp Hösli (SUI) | 1 | 0 | 3 | 0 | 2 | 0 | 0 | 1 | 7 |

=== Bronze Medal Game ===
Sunday, February 21, 13:00

| Sheet B | 1 | 2 | 3 | 4 | 5 | 6 | 7 | 8 | Final |
| Honoka Sasaki (JPN); Tyler Tardi (CAN) | 0 | 0 | 0 | 0 | 1 | 0 | 0 | X | 1 |
| Zhao Ruiyi (CHN); Andreas Hårstad (NOR) | 1 | 2 | 2 | 1 | 0 | 3 | 1 | X | 10 |

=== Gold Medal Game ===
Sunday, February 21, 13:00

| Sheet C | 1 | 2 | 3 | 4 | 5 | 6 | 7 | 8 | Final |
| Han Yu (CHN); Ross Whyte (GBR) | 0 | 2 | 1 | 0 | 1 | 0 | 1 | X | 5 |
| Yako Matsuzawa (JPN); Philipp Hösli (SUI) | 2 | 0 | 0 | 4 | 0 | 5 | 0 | X | 11 |
