= Turkey at the 2016 Winter Youth Olympics =

- IOC code: TUR
- NOC: Turkish Olympic Committee
- Website: www.olimpiyatkomitesi.org.tr

in Lillehammer
- Competitors: 13 in 6 sports
- Medals: Gold 0 Silver 0 Bronze 0 Total 0

Winter Youth Olympics appearances (overview)
- 2012; 2016; 2020; 2024

Turkey competed at the 2016 Winter Youth Olympics in Lillehammer, Norway from 12 to 21 February 2016.

== Alpine skiing ==
Boys

Athlete	Event	Run 1		Run 2		Total	
Athlete	Event	Time	Rank	Time	Rank	Time	Rank
Nihat Limon	Slalom	57.90	38	37.05	32	1:54.95	31
Nihat Limon	Giant slalom	1:30.52	44	1:29.27	33	2:59.79	34
Nihat Limon	Super-G	—				DNS	

Girls

Athlete	Event	Run 1		Run 2		Total	
Athlete	Event	Time	Rank	Time	Rank	Time	Rank
Selin Acikgoz	Slalom	DNF		did not advance			
Selin Acikgoz	Giant slalom	1:40.85	40	1:36.63	34	3:17.48	34
Selin Acikgoz	Super-G	—				DNS	

== Cross-country skiing ==
Boys

Athlete	Event	Qualification		Quarterfinal		Semifinal		Final	
Athlete	Event	Time	Rank	Time	Rank	Time	Rank	Time	Rank
Amed Oğlağo	10 km freestyle	—						26:44.4	33
Amed Oğlağo	Classical sprint	3:45.22	45	did not advance					
Amed Oğlağo	Cross-country cross	3:44.75	49	—		did not advance			

Girls

Athlete	Event	Qualification		Quarterfinal		Semifinal		Final	
Athlete	Event	Time	Rank	Time	Rank	Time	Rank	Time	Rank
Güllü Akalın	5 km freestyle	—						15:18.5	31
Güllü Akalın	Classical sprint	4:18.09	39	did not advance					
Güllü Akalın	Cross-country cross	4:08.01	34	—		did not advance			

== Curling ==
=== Mixed team ===
Team

- Tunc Esenboga
- Oguzhan Karakurt
- Beyzanur Konuksever
- Berivan Polat

Round Robin

Group A	Skip	W	L
United States	Luc Violette	6	1
Switzerland	Selina Witschonke	6	1
Russia	Nadezhda Karelina	6	1
Turkey	Oğuzhan Karakurt	3	4
Italy	Luca Rizzolli	3	4
China	Du Hongrui	2	5
New Zealand	Matthew Neilson	1	6
Japan	Kota Ito	1	6

Draw 1

Sheet C	1	2	3	4	5	6	7	8	Final
Turkey (Karakurt)	0	0	0	2	0	0	1	X	3
United States (Violette)	1	0	1	0	2	3	0	X	7

Draw 2

Sheet B	1	2	3	4	5	6	7	8	Final
Turkey (Karakurt)	0	1	1	0	2	0	0	X	4
China (Du)	2	0	0	1	0	3	3	X	9

Draw 3

Sheet A	1	2	3	4	5	6	7	8	Final
Turkey (Karakurt)	2	0	2	1	2	0	6	X	13
New Zealand (Neilson)	0	4	0	0	0	1	0	X	5

Draw 4

Sheet C	1	2	3	4	5	6	7	8	Final
Japan (Ito)	0	0	1	0	0	1	1	X	3
Turkey (Karakurt)	1	1	0	0	2	0	0	X	4

Draw 5

Sheet D	1	2	3	4	5	6	7	8	Final
Turkey (Karakurt)	0	1	0	4	0	2	2	X	9
Italy (Rizzolli)	1	0	1	0	3	0	0	X	5

Draw 6

Sheet B	1	2	3	4	5	6	7	8	Final
Switzerland (Witschonke)	1	0	2	0	1	3	0	X	7
Turkey (Karakurt)	0	1	0	1	0	0	1	X	3

Draw 7

Sheet D	1	2	3	4	5	6	7	8	Final
Russia (Karelina)	1	0	1	1	0	1	0	1	5
Turkey (Karakurt)	0	1	0	0	1	0	1	0	3

Tiebreaker

Team	1	2	3	4	5	6	7	8	Final
Turkey (Karakurt)	1	2	0	1	0	0	2	0	6
Italy (Rizzolli)	0	0	3	0	1	0	0	1	5

Quarterfinals

Sheet A	1	2	3	4	5	6	7	8	Final
Canada (Fay)	0	5	0	1	1	3	X	X	10
Turkey (Karakurt)	1	0	1	0	0	0	X	X	2

=== Mixed doubles ===
Athletes	Event	Round of 32	Round of 16	Quarterfinals	Semifinals	Final / BM	
Athletes	Event	Opposition Result	Opposition Result	Opposition Result	Opposition Result	Opposition Result	Rank
Andrea Krupanska (CZE); Oguzhan Karakurt (TUR)	Mixed doubles	Karelina (RUS); Aita (JPN); L 2 – 8	did not advance				
Oh Su-yun (KOR); Tunic Esenboga (TUR)	Mixed doubles	Arkhipova (RUS); Neilson (NZL); W 11 – 4	Han (CHN); Whyte (GBR); L 6 – 8	did not advance			
Berivan Polat (TUR); Zhang Wenxin (CHN)	Mixed doubles	Rodrigues (BRA); Doronin (RUS); W 9 – 5	Thompson (NZL); Middleton (CAN); L 2 – 9	did not advance			
Beyzanur Konuksever (TUR); Luca Rizzolli (ITA)	Mixed doubles	Laidsalu (EST); Maksimov (RUS); L 4 – 5	did not advance				

== Luge ==
Athlete	Event	Run 1		Run 2		Total	
Athlete	Event	Time	Rank	Time	Rank	Time	Rank
Cengizhan Kaplan	Boys	50.410	19	51.378	20	1:41.788	19
Goksu Ozkaya	Girls	58.244	21	57.921	21	1:56.165	21

== Ski jumping ==
Athlete	Event	First round			Final			Total	
Athlete	Event	Distance	Points	Rank	Distance	Points	Rank	Points	Rank
Muhammed Ali Bedir	Boys' normal hill	81.5	83.5	17	76.5	72.0	17	155.5	17

== Snowboarding ==
Snowboard cross

Athlete	Event	Qualification		Group heats		Semifinal	Final
Athlete	Event	Time	Rank	Points	Rank	Position	Position
Muhammed Yilmaz	Boys' snowboard cross	49.92	11 Q	8	12	did not advance	

== See also ==
- Turkey at the 2016 Summer Olympics
