= Curling at the Winter Youth Olympics =

- Governing body: WCF
- Events: 2 (mixed)

Games
- 2012; 2016; 2020; 2024

Curling was inducted at the Youth Olympic Games at the inaugural edition in 2012.

A total of 16 mixed teams (consisting of two boys and two girls) contested the mixed team tournaments in 2012 and 2016, with this being expanded to 24 teams in 2020. After the mixed team competition was finished, the mixed doubles (athletes from different countries).

== Medal summary ==
=== Mixed team ===
Games	Gold	Silver	Bronze
2012 Innsbruck	Switzerland; Michael Brunner; Elena Stern; Romano Meier; Lisa Gisler	Italy; Amos Mosaner; Denise Pimpini; Alessandro Zoppi; Arianna Losano	Canada; Thomas Scoffin; Corryn Brown; Derek Oryniak; Emily Gray
2016 Lillehammer	Canada; Mary Fay; Tyler Tardi; Karlee Burgess; Sterling Middleton	United States; Luc Violette; Cora Farrell; Ben Richardson; Cait Flannery	Switzerland; Selina Witschonke; Henwy Lochmann; Laura Engler; Philipp Hösli
2020 Lausanne	Norway; Lukas Høstmælingen; Grunde Buraas; Nora Østgård; Ingeborg Forbregd	Japan; Takumi Maeda; Momoha Tabata; Asei Nakahara; Mina Kobayashi	Russia; Valeriia Denisenko; Mikhail Vlasenko; Alina Fakhurtdinova; Nikolai Lysakov
2024 Gangwon	Great Britain; Logan Carson; Tia Laurie; Archie Hyslop; Holly Burke	Denmark; Jacob Schmidt; Katrine Schmidt; Nikki Jensen; Emilie Holtermann	Switzerland; Nathan Dryburgh; Alissa Rudolf; Livio Ernst; Jana Soltermann

=== Mixed doubles ===
Games	Gold	Silver	Bronze
2012 Innsbruck	Mixed-NOCs; Michael Brunner (SUI); Nicole Muskatewitz (GER)	Mixed-NOCs; Martin Sesaker (NOR); Kim Eun-bi (KOR)	Mixed-NOCs; Korey Dropkin (USA); Marina Verenich (RUS)
2016 Lillehammer	Mixed-NOCs; Yako Matsuzawa (JPN); Philipp Hösli (SUI)	Mixed-NOCs; Han Yu (CHN); Ross Whyte (GBR)	Mixed-NOCs; Zhao Ruiyi (CHN); Andreas Hårstad (NOR)
2020 Lausanne	Mixed-NOCs; Laura Nagy (HUN); Nathan Young (CAN)	Mixed-NOCs; Chana Beitone (FRA); Nikolai Lysakov (RUS)	Mixed-NOCs; Pei Junhang (CHN); Vít Chabičovský (CZE)
2024 Gangwon	Great Britain; Callie Soutar; Ethan Brewster	Denmark; Katrine Schmidt; Jacob Schmidt	United States; Ella Wendling; Benji Paral

== Medal table ==
As of the 2024 Winter Youth Olympics.

Rank	Nation	Gold	Silver	Bronze	Total
1	Mixed-NOCs	3	3	3	9
2	Great Britain	2	0	0	2
3	Switzerland	1	0	2	3
4	Canada	1	0	1	2
5	Norway	1	0	0	1
6	Denmark	0	2	0	2
7	United States	0	1	1	2
8	Italy	0	1	0	1
8	Japan	0	1	0	1
10	Russia	0	0	1	1
Totals (10 entries)		8	8	8	24

== Participating nations ==
Nation	2012	2016	2020	2024	Years
Austria	X			X	2
Brazil		X	X	X	3
Canada	X	X	X	X	4
China	X	X	X	X	4
Czech Republic	X	X	X	X	4
Denmark			X	X	2
Estonia	X	X	X		3
France			X		1
Germany	X		X	X	3
Great Britain	X	X	X	X	4
Hungary			X	X	2
Italy	X	X	X	X	4
Japan	X	X	X	X	4
Kazakhstan				X	1
Latvia			X	X	2
New Zealand	X	X	X	X	4
Nigeria				X	1
Norway	X	X	X	X	4
Poland			X		1
Qatar				X	1
Russia	X	X	X		3
Slovenia			X	X	2
South Korea	X	X	X	X	4
Spain			X		1
Sweden	X	X	X	X	4
Switzerland	X	X	X	X	4
Turkey		X	X	X	3
Ukraine				X	1
United States	X	X	X	X	4
29 NOC's	16	16	24	24	—N/a

== See also ==
- Curling at the Winter Olympics
