= Great Britain at the 2016 Winter Youth Olympics =

- IOC code: GBR
- NOC: British Olympic Association
- Website: www.teamgb.com

in Lillehammer
- Competitors: 16 in 7 sports
- Flag bearer: George Johnston
- Medals Ranked 14th: Gold 2 Silver 0 Bronze 2 Total 4

Winter Youth Olympics appearances (overview)
- 2012; 2016; 2020; 2024

Great Britain competed at the 2016 Winter Youth Olympics in Lillehammer, Norway from 12 to 21 February 2016.

== Medalists ==
Medal	Name	Sport	Event	Date
Gold	Madison Rowlands	Freestyle skiing	Girls' halfpipe	14 February
Gold	Ashleigh Pittaway	Skeleton	Girls'	19 February
Bronze	Madison Rowlands	Freestyle skiing	Girls' slopestyle	19 February
Bronze	Kelsea Purchall	Bobsleigh	Girls' monobob	20 February

=== Medalists in mixed NOCs events ===
Medal	Name	Sport	Event	Date
Silver	Ross Whyte	Curling	Mixed doubles	21 February

== Alpine skiing ==
Boys

Athlete	Event	Run 1		Run 2		Total	
Athlete	Event	Time	Rank	Time	Rank	Time	Rank
Iain Innes	Slalom	52.11	20	52.14	20	1:44.25	20
Iain Innes	Giant slalom	1:21.22	21	1:20.72	19	2:41.94	17
Iain Innes	Super-G	—N/a				1:14.52	32
Iain Innes	Combined	1:16.32	35	DNF			

Girls

Athlete	Event	Run 1		Run 2		Total	
Athlete	Event	Time	Rank	Time	Rank	Time	Rank
Yasmin Cooper	Slalom	1:00.63	23	53.98	19	1:54.61	20
Yasmin Cooper	Giant slalom	DNF		did not advance			
Yasmin Cooper	Super-G	—N/a				DNF	
Yasmin Cooper	Combined	1:17.49	19	45.40	16	2:02.89	13

== Bobsleigh ==
Athlete	Event	Run 1		Run 2		Total	
Athlete	Event	Time	Rank	Time	Rank	Time	Rank
George Johnston	Boys'	57.31	3	58.17	9	1:55.48	6
Annabel Chaffey	Girls'	58.68	2	59.14	5	1:57.82	4
Aimee Davey	Girls'	58.94	5	58.94	2	1:57.88	5
Kelsea Purchall	Girls'	58.70	4	58.97	3	1:57.67	3rd place, bronze medalist(s)

== Curling ==
=== Mixed team ===
Team

- Amy Bryce
- Callum Kinnear
- Mili Smith
- Ross Whyte

Round Robin

Group B	Skip	W	L
Canada	Mary Fay	7	0
Great Britain	Ross Whyte	6	1
Sweden	Johan Nygren	5	2
Norway	Maia Ramsfjell	4	3
South Korea	Hong Yun-jeong	3	4
Czech Republic	Pavel Mareš	2	5
Estonia	Eiko-Siim Peips	1	6
Brazil	Victor Santos	0	7

Draw 1

Sheet D	1	2	3	4	5	6	7	8	Final
South Korea (Hong) 🔨	0	1	0	0	0	0	1	X	2
Great Britain (Whyte)	2	0	1	1	2	3	0	X	9

Draw 2

Sheet A	1	2	3	4	5	6	7	8	Final
Canada (Fay)	0	0	0	0	1	0	1	2	4
Great Britain (Whyte) 🔨	0	0	1	0	0	1	0	0	2

Draw 3

Sheet B	1	2	3	4	5	6	7	8	Final
Brazil (Santos)	0	0	0	0	0	0	X	X	0
Great Britain (Whyte) 🔨	5	2	2	3	6	3	X	X	21

Draw 4

Sheet D	1	2	3	4	5	6	7	8	Final
Great Britain (Whyte) 🔨	0	4	1	4	0	0	X	X	9
Norway (Ramsfjell)	1	0	0	0	2	0	X	X	3

Draw 5

Sheet C	1	2	3	4	5	6	7	8	Final
Sweden (Nygren)	0	1	0	0	1	0	X	X	2
Great Britain (Whyte) 🔨	4	0	2	1	0	1	X	X	8

Draw 6

Sheet B	1	2	3	4	5	6	7	8	Final
Great Britain (Whyte) 🔨	2	1	0	3	0	2	X	X	8
Estonia (Peips)	0	0	1	0	1	0	X	X	2

Draw 7

Sheet C	1	2	3	4	5	6	7	8	Final
Great Britain (Whyte) 🔨	0	0	4	4	0	1	X	X	9
Czech Republic (Mareš)	1	1	0	0	1	0	X	X	3

Quarterfinals

Sheet D	1	2	3	4	5	6	7	8	Final
Great Britain (Whyte)	1	0	1	0	1	0	2	0	5
Russia (Karelina) 🔨	0	3	0	1	0	2	0	3	9

=== Mixed doubles ===
Athletes	Event	Round of 32	Round of 16	Quarterfinals	Semifinals	Final / BM	
Athletes	Event	Opposition Result	Opposition Result	Opposition Result	Opposition Result	Opposition Result	Rank
Han Yu (CHN); Ross Whyte (GBR)	Mixed doubles	Fay (CAN); Rocha (BRA); W 9 – 5	Oh (KOR); Esenboga (TUR); W 8 – 6	Witschonke (SUI); Gustsin (EST); W 6 – 5	Sasaki (JPN); Tardi (CAN); W 6 – 3	Matsuzawa (JPN); Hoesli (SUI); L 5 – 11	2nd place, silver medalist(s)
Amy Bryce (GBR); Martin Blahovec (CZE)	Mixed doubles	Sasaki (JPN); Tardi (CAN); L 1 – 12	did not advance				
Mili Smith (GBR); Hong Jun-yeong (KOR)	Mixed doubles	Thompson (NZL); Middleton (CAN); L 2 – 8	did not advance				
Stefania Constantini (ITA); Callum Kinnear (GBR)	Mixed doubles	Burgess (CAN); Peips (EST); W 9 – 1	Karelina (RUS); Aita (JPN); W 7 – 3	Zhao (CHN); Haarstad (NOR); L 9 – 10	did not advance		

== Freestyle skiing ==
Halfpipe

Athlete	Event	Final				
Athlete	Event	Run 1	Run 2	Run 3	Best	Rank
Madison Rowlands	Girls' halfpipe	83.20	88.60	41.60	88.60	(gold)

Ski cross

Athlete	Event	Qualification		Group heats		Semifinal	Final
Athlete	Event	Time	Rank	Points	Rank	Position	Position
Isobel Brown	Girls' ski cross	48.69	14	2	16	did not advance	

Slopestyle

Athlete	Event	Final			
Athlete	Event	Run 1	Run 2	Best	Rank
Cal Sandieson	Boys' slopestyle	72.80	81.00	81.00	4
Madison Rowlands	Girls' slopestyle	67.20	67.80	67.80	(bronze)

== Ice hockey ==
Athlete	Event	Qualification		Final	
Athlete	Event	Points	Rank	Points	Rank
Verity Lewis	Girls' individual skills challenge	11	10	did not advance	

== Luge ==
Individual sleds

Athlete	Event	Run 1		Run 2		Total	
Athlete	Event	Time	Rank	Time	Rank	Time	Rank
Lucas Gebauer-Barrett	Boys	48.821	11	48.650	10	1:37.471	10

Mixed team relay

Athlete	Event	Girls		Boys		Doubles		Total	
Athlete	Event	Time	Rank	Time	Rank	Time	Rank	Time	Rank
Anastassiya Bogacheva (KAZ); Lucas Gebauer-Barrett (GBR); Roman Yefremov (KAZ); Denis Tatyanchenko (KAZ)	Team relay	59.432	12	59.536	11	1:02.099	11	3:01.067	12

== Skeleton ==
Athlete	Event	Run 1		Run 2		Total	
Athlete	Event	Time	Rank	Time	Rank	Time	Rank
Ashleigh Pittaway	Girls	55.08	1	55.15	1	1:50.23	(gold)

== See also ==
- Great Britain at the 2016 Summer Olympics
