= Elian Rocha =

Brazilian curler (born 2000)

- Curler
- Born: 6 April 2000 (age 26)

Team
- Curling club: Vancouver CC, Vancouver, BC

Curling career
- Member Association: Brazil
- Other appearances: Youth Olympic Games: 1 (2016)

Elian Sabra Rocha (born 6 April 2000) is a Brazilian curler.

At the international level, he competed at the 2016 Winter Youth Olympics (finishing 16th with the Brazilian mixed team and 17th on an international mixed doubles team with Mary Fay from Canada).

== Teams ==
=== Mixed ===
Season	Skip	Third	Second	Lead	Coach	Events
2015–16	Victor Santos	Raissa Rodrigues	Elian Rocha	Giovanna Barros	Robbie Gallaugher	WYOG 2016 (16th)

=== Mixed doubles ===
Season	Female	Male	Coach	Events
2015–16	(Canada) Mary Fay	(Brazil) Elian Rocha	Robbie Gallaugher	WYOG 2016 (17th)

== Personal life ==
Rocha resides in Sherbrooke, Québec, Canada.
