= Japan at the 2016 Winter Youth Olympics =

- IOC code: JPN
- NOC: Japanese Olympic Committee
- Website: www.joc.or.jp

in Lillehammer
- Competitors: 29 in 11 sports
- Flag bearer: Masamitsu Ito
- Medals Ranked 11th: Gold 2 Silver 4 Bronze 0 Total 6

Winter Youth Olympics appearances (overview)
- 2012; 2016; 2020; 2024

Japan competed at the 2016 Winter Youth Olympics in Lillehammer, Norway from 12 to 21 February 2016.

== Medalists ==
Medal	Name	Sport	Event	Date
Gold	Sota Yamamoto	Figure skating	Boys' singles	15 February
Gold	Sena Takenaka	Ice hockey	Girls' individual skills challenge	16 February
Silver	Kazuki Sakakibara	Speed skating	Boys' 500 m	13 February
Silver	Daichi Horikawa	Speed skating	Boys' 1500 m	15 February
Silver	Kazuki Yoshinaga	Short track	Boys' 500 m	16 February
Silver	Yohei Koyama	Alpine skiing	Boys' giant slalom	17 February

=== Medalists in mixed NOCs events ===
Medal	Name	Sport	Event	Date
Gold	Yako Matsuzawa	Curling	Mixed doubles	21 February
Silver	Kiichi Shigehiro	Short track	Mixed team relay	20 February
Bronze	Kazuki Yoshinaga	Short track	Mixed team relay	20 February

Medals by sport
Sport	1st place, gold medalist(s)	2nd place, silver medalist(s)	3rd place, bronze medalist(s)	Total
Figure skating	1	0	0	1
Ice hockey	1	0	0	1
Speed skating	0	2	0	2
Alpine skiing	0	1	0	1
Short track	0	1	0	1
Total	2	4	0	6

== Alpine skiing ==
Boys

Athlete	Event	Run 1		Run 2		Total	
Athlete	Event	Time	Rank	Time	Rank	Time	Rank
Yohei Koyama	Slalom	DNF		did not advance			
Yohei Koyama	Giant slalom	1:18.00	3	1:18.12	4	2:36.12	2nd place, silver medalist(s)
Yohei Koyama	Super-G	—N/a				1:12.57	17
Yohei Koyama	Combined	1:13.15	12	41.72	7	1:54.87	8

Girls

Athlete	Event	Run 1		Run 2		Total	
Athlete	Event	Time	Rank	Time	Rank	Time	Rank
Chisaki Maeda	Slalom	DNF		did not advance			
Chisaki Maeda	Giant slalom	DNF		did not advance			
Chisaki Maeda	Super-G	—N/a				1:16.92	21
Chisaki Maeda	Combined	1:18.52	23	44.79	9	2:03.31	15

Parallel mixed team

Athletes	Event	Round of 16	Quarterfinals	Semifinals	Final / BM	
Athletes	Event	Opposition Score	Opposition Score	Opposition Score	Opposition Score	Rank
Chisaki Maeda; Yohei Koyama	Parallel mixed team	Austria; L 2 – 2^{+}	did not advance			

== Cross-country skiing ==
Boys

Athlete	Event	Qualification		Quarterfinal		Semifinal		Final	
Athlete	Event	Time	Rank	Time	Rank	Time	Rank	Time	Rank
Riku Kasahara	10 km freestyle	—N/a						25:34.1	15
Riku Kasahara	Classical sprint	3:14.45	30 Q	3:15.13	6	did not advance			
Riku Kasahara	Cross-country cross	3:16.92	23 Q	—N/a		3:16.44	7	did not advance	

Girls

Athlete	Event	Qualification		Quarterfinal		Semifinal		Final	
Athlete	Event	Time	Rank	Time	Rank	Time	Rank	Time	Rank
Hikari Miyazaki	5 km freestyle	—N/a						14:07.8	15
Hikari Miyazaki	Classical sprint	3:42.71	21 Q	3:38.83	5	did not advance			
Hikari Miyazaki	Cross-country cross	3:52.03	21 Q	—N/a		3:45.82	6	did not advance	

== Curling ==
=== Mixed team ===
Team

- Kosuke Aita
- Kota Ito
- Yako Matsuzawa
- Honoka Sasaki

Round Robin

Group A	Skip	W	L
United States	Luc Violette	6	1
Switzerland	Selina Witschonke	6	1
Russia	Nadezhda Karelina	6	1
Turkey	Oğuzhan Karakurt	3	4
Italy	Luca Rizzolli	3	4
China	Du Hongrui	2	5
New Zealand	Matthew Neilson	1	6
Japan	Kota Ito	1	6

Draw 1

Sheet A	1	2	3	4	5	6	7	8	Final
Japan (Ito)	0	0	1	0	0	0	0	X	1
Italy (Rizzolli) 🔨	0	1	0	3	0	1	2	X	7

Draw 2

Sheet D	1	2	3	4	5	6	7	8	Final
Japan (Ito) 🔨	1	0	0	1	0	1	0	0	3
Russia (Karelina)	0	2	0	0	1	0	1	1	5

Draw 3

Sheet B	1	2	3	4	5	6	7	8	9	Final
Japan (Ito)	0	1	0	1	1	1	0	1	0	5
Switzerland (Witschonke) 🔨	4	0	1	0	0	0	0	0	1	6

Draw 4

Sheet C	1	2	3	4	5	6	7	8	Final
Japan (Ito)	0	0	1	0	0	1	1	X	3
Turkey (Karakurt) 🔨	1	1	0	0	2	0	0	X	4

Draw 5

Sheet A	1	2	3	4	5	6	7	8	Final
China (Du)	1	0	0	1	1	0	0	X	3
Japan (Ito) 🔨	0	2	1	0	0	2	2	X	7

Draw 6

Sheet C	1	2	3	4	5	6	7	8	Final
New Zealand (Neilson) 🔨	2	0	0	0	3	0	2	X	7
Japan (Ito)	0	2	1	1	0	1	0	X	5

Draw 7

Sheet B	1	2	3	4	5	6	7	8	Final
United States (Violette) 🔨	2	0	0	1	0	5	1	X	9
Japan (Ito)	0	0	1	0	2	0	0	X	3

=== Mixed doubles ===
Athletes	Event	Round of 32	Round of 16	Quarterfinals	Semifinals	Final / BM	
Athletes	Event	Opposition Result	Opposition Result	Opposition Result	Opposition Result	Opposition Result	Rank
Honoka Sasaki (JPN); Tyler Tardi (CAN)	Mixed doubles	Bryce (GBR); Blahovec (CZE); W 12 – 1	Laidsalu (EST); Maksimov (RUS); W 6 – 2	Ramsfjell (NOR); Kim (KOR); W 7 – 5	Han (CHN); Whyte (GBR); L 3 - 6	Zhao (CHN); Haarstad (NOR); L 1 - 10	4
Yako Matsuzawa (JPN); Philipp Hoesli (SUI)	Mixed doubles	Mjoen (NOR); Mares (CZE); W 9 – 6	Sillaots (EST); Violette (USA); W 10 – 5	Thompson (NZL); Middleton (CAN); W 11 – 1	Zhao (CHN); Haarstad (NOR); W 7 – 6	Han (CHN); Whyte (GBR); W 11 – 5	1st place, gold medalist(s)
Nadezhda Karelina (RUS); Kosuke Aita (JPN)	Mixed doubles	Krupanska (CZE); Karakurt (TUR); W 8 – 2	Constantini (ITA); Kinnear (GBR); L 3 – 7	did not advance			
Cait Flannery (USA); Kota Ito (JPN)	Mixed doubles	Podrabska (CZE); Degerfeldt (SWE); L 7 – 8	did not advance				

== Figure skating ==
Singles

Athlete	Event	SP		FS		Total	
Athlete	Event	Points	Rank	Points	Rank	Points	Rank
Koshiro Shimada	Boys' singles	63.18	6	119.34	6	182.52	6
Sota Yamamoto	Boys' singles	73.07	1	142.45	3	215.52	1st place, gold medalist(s)
Kaori Sakamoto	Girls' singles	56.25	5	98.98	6	155.23	6
Yuna Shiraiwa	Girls' singles	60.87	1	105.79	5	166.66	4

Mixed NOC team trophy

Athletes	Event	Free skate/Free dance					
Athletes	Event	Ice dance	Pairs	Girls	Boys	Total	
Athletes	Event	Points Team points	Points Team points	Points Team points	Points Team points	Points	Rank
Team Focus; Maria Golubtsova / Kirill Belobrov (UKR); Zhao Ying / Xie Zhong (CHN); Yuna Shiraiwa (JPN); Lauri Lankila (FIN)	Team trophy	64.68; 4	92.74; 5	110.01; 8	61.57; 1	18	5

== Ice hockey ==
Athlete	Event	Qualification		Final	
Athlete	Event	Points	Rank	Points	Rank
Roy Kanda	Boys' individual skills challenge	8	13	did not advance	
Sena Takenaka	Girls' individual skills challenge	18	2 Q	16	1st place, gold medalist(s)

== Nordic combined ==
Individual

Athlete	Event	Ski jumping				Cross-country	
Athlete	Event	Distance	Points	Rank	Deficit	Time	Rank
Yoshihiro Kimura	Normal hill/5 km	88.5	109.7	11	1:28	14:58.5	11

Nordic mixed team

Athlete	Event	Ski jumping			Cross-country	
Athlete	Event	Points	Rank	Deficit	Time	Rank
Shihori Oi; Yoshihiro Kimura; Masamitsu Ito; Hikari Miyazaki; Riku Kasahara	Nordic mixed team	314.2	8	1:22	28:01.7	7

== Skeleton ==
Athlete	Event	Run 1		Run 2		Total	
Athlete	Event	Time	Rank	Time	Rank	Time	Rank
Sho Gonai	Boys	55.63	15	55.71	15	1:51.34	15
Mayu Ijichi	Girls	57.20	13	56.69	9	1:53.89	10
Madoka Oi	Girls	57.70	17	58.82	20	1:56.52	19

== Ski jumping ==
Individual

Athlete	Event	First round			Final			Total	
Athlete	Event	Distance	Points	Rank	Distance	Points	Rank	Points	Rank
Masamitsu Ito	Boys' normal hill	95.5	120.6	4	91.5	114.1	4	234.7	4
Shihori Oi	Girls' normal hill	73.0	72.3	11	72.5	71.3	11	143.6	11

Team

Athlete	Event	First round		Final		Total	
Athlete	Event	Points	Rank	Points	Rank	Points	Rank
Shihori Oi; Yoshihiro Kimura; Masamitsu Ito	Team competition	288.5	8	290.2	8	578.7	8

== Short track speed skating ==
Boys

Athlete	Event	Quarterfinal		Semifinal		Final	
Athlete	Event	Time	Rank	Time	Rank	Time	Rank
Kiichi Shigehiro	500 m	42.671	2 SA/B	42.403	4 FB	43.041	7
Kiichi Shigehiro	1000 m	1:33.688	1 SA/B	1:27.288	2 FA	1:28.718	4
Kazuki Yoshinaga	500 m	43.657	2 SA/B	42.416	2 FA	41.969	2nd place, silver medalist(s)
Kazuki Yoshinaga	1000 m	1:33.006	2 SA/B	1:28.295	3 FB	1:41.778	6

Girls

Athlete	Event	Quarterfinal		Semifinal		Final	
Athlete	Event	Time	Rank	Time	Rank	Time	Rank
Shione Kaminaga	500 m	46.032	2 SA/B	46.741	3 FB	47.916	5
Shione Kaminaga	1000 m	1:41.026	3 FC	—N/a		1:35.903	11

Mixed team relay

Athlete	Event	Semifinal		Final	
Athlete	Event	Time	Rank	Time	Rank
Team C Petra Jaszapati (HUN); Julia Moore (AUS); Tjerk De Boer (NED); Kiichi Shigehiro (JPN)	Mixed team relay	4:15.332	1 FA	4:14.495	2nd place, silver medalist(s)
Team F Katrin Manoilova (BUL); Anita Nagay (KAZ); Karlis Kruzbergs (LAT); Kazuki Yoshinaga (JPN)	Mixed team relay	4:15.669	1 FA	4:17.181	3rd place, bronze medalist(s)
Team H Shione Kaminaga (JPN); Gioya Lancee (NED); Moritz Kreuseler (GER); Ma Wei (CHN)	Mixed team relay	4:27.607	3 FB	4:22.198	4

Qualification Legend: FA=Final A (medal); FB=Final B (non-medal); FC=Final C (non-medal); FD=Final D (non-medal); SA/B=Semifinals A/B; SC/D=Semifinals C/D; ADV=Advanced to Next Round; PEN=Penalized

== Snowboarding ==
Halfpipe

Athlete	Event	Final				
Athlete	Event	Run 1	Run 2	Run 3	Best	Rank
Junna Asaya	Girls' halfpipe	78.25	70.00	80.75	80.75	4

Snowboard cross

Athlete	Event	Qualification		Group heats		Semifinal	Final
Athlete	Event	Time	Rank	Points	Rank	Position	Position
Yoshiki Takahara	Boys' snowboard cross	49.39	10 Q	15	5 Q	3 FB	5

Snowboard and ski cross relay

Athlete	Event	Quarterfinal	Semifinal	Final
Athlete	Event	Position	Position	Position
Caterina Carpano (ITA); Minja Lehikoinen (FIN); Yoshiki Takahara (JPN); Tobias Knollseisen (ITA)	Team snowboard ski cross	3	did not advance	

Qualification legend: FA – Qualify to medal round; FB – Qualify to consolation round

== Speed skating ==
Boys

Athlete	Event	Race 1		Race 2		Final	
Athlete	Event	Time	Rank	Time	Rank	Time	Rank
Daichi Horikawa	500 m	37.35	8	37.03	4	74.386	8
Daichi Horikawa	1500 m	—N/a				1:52.96	2nd place, silver medalist(s)
Daichi Horikawa	Mass start	—N/a				5:53.03	7
Kazuki Sakakibara	500 m	36.84	2	37.12	7	73.97	2nd place, silver medalist(s)
Kazuki Sakakibara	1500 m	—N/a				1:57.26	16

Girls

Athlete	Event	Race 1		Race 2		Final	
Athlete	Event	Time	Rank	Time	Rank	Time	Rank
Moe Kumagai	500 m	40.71	6	41.00	9	81.71	8
Moe Kumagai	1500 m	—N/a				2:14.34	20
Yuna Onodera	500 m	41.58	12	41.70	13	83.28	11
Yuna Onodera	1500 m	—N/a				2:11.37	15
Yuna Onodera	Mass start	—N/a				5:56.41	11

Mixed team sprint

Athletes	Event	Final	
Athletes	Event	Time	Rank
Team 3 Viola Feichtner (AUT); Li Huawei (CHN); Li Yanzhe (CHN); Kazuki Sakakibara (JPN)	Mixed team sprint	1:59.20	6
Team 8 Natalie Kerschbaummayr (CZE); Moe Kumagai (JPN); Dmitrii Filimonov (RUS); Kaspar Kaljuvee (EST)	Mixed team sprint	DSQ	
Team 11; Anna Nifantava (BLR); Yuna Onodera (JPN); Daan Baks (NED); Francesco Betti (ITA)	Mixed team sprint	2:00.13	9
Team 12; Lea Scholz (GER); Yauheniya Varabyova (BLR); Daichi Horikawa (JPN); Lukas Mann (GER)	Mixed team sprint	1:58.95	4

== See also ==
- Japan at the 2016 Summer Olympics
