= Estonia at the 2016 Winter Youth Olympics =

- IOC code: EST
- NOC: Estonian Olympic Committee
- Website: www.eok.ee

in Lillehammer
- Competitors: 17 (10 boys, 7 girls) in 8 sports
- Flag bearer: Anneliis Viilukas
- Medals: Gold 0 Silver 0 Bronze 0 Total 0

Winter Youth Olympics appearances (overview)
- 2012; 2016; 2020; 2024

Estonia competed at the 2016 Winter Youth Olympics in Lillehammer, Norway from 12 to 21 February 2016.

== Alpine skiing ==
Girls

| Athlete | Event | Run 1 | | Run 2 | | Total | |
| Athlete | Event | Time | Rank | Time | Rank | Time | Rank |
|---|---|---|---|---|---|---|---|
| Anna Lotta Jõgeva | Slalom | 1:09.98 | 35 | 1:05.92 | 30 | 2:15.90 | 30 |
| Anna Lotta Jõgeva | Giant slalom | 1:37.57 | 39 | 1:32.54 | 33 | 3:10.11 | 33 |
| Anna Lotta Jõgeva | Super-G | —N/a | | | | 1:24.50 | 35 |
| Anna Lotta Jõgeva | Combined | 1:26.07 | 33 | 56.17 | 24 | 2:22.24 | 24 |

== Biathlon ==
Boys

| Athlete | Event | Time | Misses | Rank |
|---|---|---|---|---|
| Robert Heldna | Sprint | 19:37.0 | 1 | 5 |
| Robert Heldna | Pursuit | 30:55.9 | 6 | 9 |
| Mart Všivtsev | Sprint | 21:35.8 | 4 | 33 |
| Mart Všivtsev | Pursuit | 34:40.7 | 7 | 36 |

Girls

| Athlete | Event | Time | Misses | Rank |
|---|---|---|---|---|
| Hanna Moor | Sprint | 21:20.7 | 2 | 38 |
| Hanna Moor | Pursuit | 35:53.7 | 12 | 46 |
| Anneliis Viilukas | Sprint | 19:52.9 | 3 | 18 |
| Anneliis Viilukas | Pursuit | 27:43.9 | 4 | 19 |

Mixed

| Athletes | Event | Time | Misses | Rank |
|---|---|---|---|---|
| Anneliis Viilukas; Robert Heldna | Single mixed relay | 47:29.8 | 9+18 | 22 |
| Hanna Moor; Anneliis Viilukas; Mart Všivtsev; Robert Heldna | Mixed relay | 1:30:58.1 | 8+16 | 17 |

== Cross-country skiing ==
Boys

| Athlete | Event | Qualification | | Quarterfinal | | Semifinal | | Final | |
| Athlete | Event | Time | Rank | Time | Rank | Time | Rank | Time | Rank |
|---|---|---|---|---|---|---|---|---|---|
| Kaarel Karri | 10 km freestyle | —N/a | | | | | | 26:19.6 | 29 |
| Kaarel Karri | Classical sprint | 3:07.51 | 14 Q | 3:03.67 | 4 | Did not advance | | | |
| Kaarel Karri | Cross-country cross | 3:16.73 | 22 Q | —N/a | | 3:14.44 | 8 | Did not advance | |

Girls

| Athlete | Event | Qualification | | Quarterfinal | | Semifinal | | Final | |
| Athlete | Event | Time | Rank | Time | Rank | Time | Rank | Time | Rank |
|---|---|---|---|---|---|---|---|---|---|
| Stine-Lise Truu | 5 km freestyle | —N/a | | | | | | 14:16.3 | 18 |
| Stine-Lise Truu | Classical sprint | 3:37.30 | 11 Q | 3:31.08 | 3 q | 3:34.62 | 6 | Did not advance | |
| Stine-Lise Truu | Cross-country cross | 3:52.30 | 22 Q | —N/a | | 3:52.58 | 9 | Did not advance | |

== Curling ==
=== Mixed team ===
Team

- Jarl Gustsin
- Kristin Laidsalu
- Eiko-Siim Peips
- Britta Sillaots

Round Robin

| Group B | Skip | W | L |
|---|---|---|---|
| Canada | Mary Fay | 7 | 0 |
| Great Britain | Ross Whyte | 6 | 1 |
| Sweden | Johan Nygren | 5 | 2 |
| Norway | Maia Ramsfjell | 4 | 3 |
| South Korea | Hong Yun-jeong | 3 | 4 |
| Czech Republic | Pavel Mareš | 2 | 5 |
| Estonia | Eiko-Siim Peips | 1 | 6 |
| Brazil | Victor Santos | 0 | 7 |

Draw 1

| Sheet C | 1 | 2 | 3 | 4 | 5 | 6 | 7 | 8 | Final |
| Estonia (Peips) | 0 | 1 | 0 | 1 | 0 | 0 | X | X | 2 |
| Canada (Fay) 🔨 | 5 | 0 | 2 | 0 | 4 | 2 | X | X | 13 |

Draw 2

| Sheet C | 1 | 2 | 3 | 4 | 5 | 6 | 7 | 8 | Final |
| Estonia (Peips) 🔨 | 0 | 1 | 0 | 2 | 0 | 0 | 1 | 0 | 4 |
| South Korea (Hong) | 3 | 0 | 1 | 0 | 1 | 0 | 0 | 1 | 6 |

Draw 3

| Sheet A | 1 | 2 | 3 | 4 | 5 | 6 | 7 | 8 | Final |
| Estonia (Peips) | 0 | 0 | 1 | 0 | 0 | 0 | X | X | 1 |
| Norway (Ramsfjell) 🔨 | 4 | 1 | 0 | 1 | 0 | 2 | X | X | 8 |

Draw 4

| Sheet C | 1 | 2 | 3 | 4 | 5 | 6 | 7 | 8 | Final |
| Brazil (Santos) | 0 | 0 | 0 | 1 | 0 | 0 | X | X | 1 |
| Estonia (Peips) 🔨 | 3 | 2 | 4 | 0 | 3 | 3 | X | X | 15 |

Draw 5

| Sheet D | 1 | 2 | 3 | 4 | 5 | 6 | 7 | 8 | Final |
| Estonia (Peips) | 0 | 1 | 1 | 0 | 1 | 0 | 1 | 0 | 4 |
| Czech Republic (Mareš) 🔨 | 3 | 0 | 0 | 2 | 0 | 2 | 0 | 1 | 8 |

Draw 6

| Sheet B | 1 | 2 | 3 | 4 | 5 | 6 | 7 | 8 | Final |
| Great Britain (Whyte) 🔨 | 2 | 1 | 0 | 3 | 0 | 2 | X | X | 8 |
| Estonia (Peips) | 0 | 0 | 1 | 0 | 1 | 0 | X | X | 2 |

Draw 7

| Sheet D | 1 | 2 | 3 | 4 | 5 | 6 | 7 | 8 | Final |
| Sweden (Nygren) | 1 | 1 | 0 | 2 | 0 | 0 | 4 | X | 8 |
| Estonia (Peips) 🔨 | 0 | 0 | 1 | 0 | 1 | 1 | 0 | X | 3 |

=== Mixed doubles ===
| Athletes | Event | Round of 32 | Round of 16 | Quarterfinals | Semifinals | Final / BM | |
| Athletes | Event | Opposition Result | Opposition Result | Opposition Result | Opposition Result | Opposition Result | Rank |
|---|---|---|---|---|---|---|---|
| Karlee Burgess (CAN); Eiko-Siim Peips (EST) | Mixed doubles | Constantini (ITA); Kinnear (GBR); L 1 – 9 | Did not advance | | | | |
| Kristin Laidsalu (EST); Sergei Maksimov (RUS) | Mixed doubles | Konuksever (TUR); Rizzolli (ITA); W 5 – 4 | Sasaki (JPN); Tardi (CAN); L 2 – 6 | Did not advance | | | |
| Britta Sillaots (EST); Luc Violette (USA) | Mixed doubles | Petterson (SWE); Zisa (ITA); W 7 – 4 | Matsuzawa (JPN); Hoesli (SUI); L 5 – 10 | Did not advance | | | |
| Selina Witschonke (SUI); Jarl Gustsin (EST) | Mixed doubles | Ghezze (ITA); Mellemseter (NOR); W 9 – 3 | Podrabska (CZE); Degerfeldt (SWE); W 11 – 1 | Han (CHN); Whyte (GBR); L 5 – 6 | Did not advance | | |

== Figure skating ==
Couples

| Athletes | Event | SP/SD | | FS/FD | | Total | |
| Athletes | Event | Points | Rank | Points | Rank | Points | Rank |
|---|---|---|---|---|---|---|---|
| Viktoria Semenjuk; Artur Gruzdev | Ice dancing | 40.06 | 10 | 58.54 | 10 | 98.60 | 10 |

== Nordic combined ==
| Athlete | Event | Ski jumping | | | | Cross-country | |
| Athlete | Event | Distance | Points | Rank | Deficit | Time | Rank |
|---|---|---|---|---|---|---|---|
| Andreas Ilves | Normal hill/5 km | 85.5 | 99.0 | 14 | 2:11 | 15:19.0 | 13 |

== Ski jumping ==
| Athlete | Event | First round | | | Final | | | Total | |
| Athlete | Event | Distance | Points | Rank | Distance | Points | Rank | Points | Rank |
|---|---|---|---|---|---|---|---|---|---|
| Artti Aigro | Boys' normal hill | 83.0 | 87.9 | 16 | 79.0 | 82.5 | 16 | 170.4 | 16 |

== Speed skating ==
Boys

| Athlete | Event | Race 1 | | Race 2 | | Final | |
| Athlete | Event | Time | Rank | Time | Rank | Time | Rank |
|---|---|---|---|---|---|---|---|
| Kaspar Kaljuvee | 500 m | 38.55 | 19 | 38.79 | 24 | 77.34 | 24 |
| Kaspar Kaljuvee | 1500 m | —N/a | | | | 1:57.77 | 21 |
| Kaspar Kaljuvee | Mass start | —N/a | | | | 5:53.47 | 11 |
| Kermo Voitka | 500 m | 38.89 | 27 | 39.91 | 27 | 79.81 | 27 |
| Kermo Voitka | 1500 m | —N/a | | | | 2:05.30 | 27 |
| Kermo Voitka | Mass start | —N/a | | | | 5:58.28 | 22 |

Mixed team sprint

| Athletes | Event | Final | |
| Athletes | Event | Time | Rank |
|---|---|---|---|
| Team 8 Natalie Kerschbaummayr (CZE); Moe Kumagai (JPN); Dmitrii Filimonov (RUS); Kaspar Kaljuvee (EST) | Mixed team sprint | DSQ | |

== See also ==
- Estonia at the 2016 Summer Olympics
