= Giovanna Barros =

Brazilian curler (born 2001)

- Curler
- Born: 12 April 2001 (age 25); Brasília, Brazil

Team
- Curling club: Vancouver CC, Vancouver, BC

Curling career
- Member Association: Brazil
- Other appearances: Youth Olympic Games: 1 (2016)

Giovanna Barros (born 12 April 2001 in Brasília) is a Brazilian curler.

At the international level, she competed at the 2016 Winter Youth Olympics (finished 16th with Brazilian mixed team and 9th on an international mixed doubles team with Ben Richardson from United States).

== Teams ==
=== Mixed ===
Season	Skip	Third	Second	Lead	Coach	Events
2015–16	Victor Santos	Raissa Rodrigues	Elian Rocha	Giovanna Barros	Robbie Gallaugher	WYOG 2016 (16th)

=== Mixed doubles ===
Season	Female	Male	Coach	Events
2015–16	(Brazil) Giovanna Barros	(United States) Ben Richardson	Tom Violette	WYOG 2016 (9th)

== Personal life ==
Giovanna Barros is a daughter of the Brazilian curler Alessandra Barros. She resides in Vancouver, British Columbia, Canada.
