= Raissa Rodrigues =

Brazilian curler (born 1998)

- Curler
- Born: 12 February 1998 (age 28)

Team
- Curling club: Vancouver CC, Vancouver, BC

Curling career
- Member Association: Brazil
- Other appearances: Youth Olympic Games: 1 (2016)

Raissa Rodrigues (born 12 February 1998) is a Brazilian curler.

At the international level, she competed at the 2016 Winter Youth Olympics (finished 16th with Brazilian mixed team and 17th on an international mixed doubles team with German Doronin from Russia).

== Teams ==
=== Mixed ===
| Season | Skip | Third | Second | Lead | Coach | Events |
|---|---|---|---|---|---|---|
| 2015–16 | Victor Santos | Raissa Rodrigues | Elian Rocha | Giovanna Barros | Robbie Gallaugher | WYOG 2016 (16th) |

=== Mixed doubles ===
| Season | Female | Male | Coach | Events |
|---|---|---|---|---|
| 2015–16 | (Brazil) Raissa Rodrigues | (Russia) German Doronin | Robbie Gallaugher | WYOG 2016 (17th) |

== Personal life ==
Rodrigues resides in Vancouver, British Columbia, Canada.
