= Curling at the 2016 Winter Youth Olympics =

Curling at the II Winter Youth Olympic Games
- Venue: Kristins Hall, Lillehammer
- Dates: 12–21 February
- Competitors: 64 from 16 nations

Curling at the 2016 Winter Youth Olympics was contested at the Kristins Hall in Lillehammer, Norway from 12 to 21 February. The mixed team event took place from 12 to 17 February, while the mixed doubles tournament took place from 19 to 21 February.

The Athlete Role Model for the Youth Olympics curling competition was Rasmus Stjerne of Denmark.

== Medal summary ==
=== Medal table ===
Rank	Nation	Gold	Silver	Bronze	Total
–	Mixed-NOCs	1	1	1	3
1	Canada	1	0	0	1
2	United States	0	1	0	1
3	Switzerland	0	0	1	1
Totals (3 entries)		2	2	2	6

=== Events ===
Games	Gold	Silver	Bronze
Mixed team	Canada; Mary Fay; Tyler Tardi; Karlee Burgess; Sterling Middleton	United States; Luc Violette; Cora Farrell; Ben Richardson; Cait Flannery	Switzerland; Selina Witschonke; Henwy Lochmann; Laura Engler; Philipp Hösli
Mixed doubles	JPN/SUI; Mixed-NOCs; Yako Matsuzawa (JPN); Philipp Hösli (SUI)	CHN/GBR; Mixed-NOCs; Han Yu (CHN); Ross Whyte (GBR)	CHN/NOR; Mixed-NOCs; Zhao Ruiyi (CHN); Andreas Hårstad (NOR)

== Format of play ==
At the 2016 Winter Youth Olympics, there was two tournaments and two sets of medals awarded for each tournament. There was a mixed team curling tournament and a mixed doubles curling tournament.

=== Mixed team curling ===
The mixed team curling teams consisted of two boys and two girls from the same NOC/country.

The sixteen qualified teams competed in two divisions of round robin play. The top four teams from each group advanced to the quarterfinals, where the teams played a single knockout tournament to determine the winner.

=== Mixed NOC doubles curling ===
The mixed NOC doubles curling teams consisted of one boy and one girl from different NOCs. The mixed doubles competition took place after the mixed team competition; the same athletes competing in the mixed event competed in the mixed doubles event. The mixed doubles teams was selected by the organizing committee based on the final rankings from the mixed team competition. The resulting 32 teams played a single knockout round to determine the winner.

== Qualification ==
=== Summary ===
Region	Vacancies	Qualified
Host Nation	1	Norway
North America^{1}	2	Canada; United States
South America^{1}	1	Brazil
Asia^{2}	3	South Korea; China; Japan
Oceania	1	New Zealand
Europe	8	Switzerland; Great Britain; Sweden; Russia; Italy; Czech Republic; Estonia; Turkey
TOTAL	16	

=== Qualification points ===
The qualification of NOCs to the 2016 Winter Youth Olympics was determined using qualification points. The qualification points are allotted based on the nations' final rankings at international junior curling championships, which include the regional championships (the European Junior Curling Challenge and the Pacific-Asia Junior Curling Championships) and the World Junior Curling Championships. Nations that qualify from the regional championships to the world championships only receive points from their final ranking at the world championships. The results from the 2013–14 and 2014–15 curling seasons are considered for qualification to the 2016 Winter Youth Olympics. The points are distributed as follows:

World Championships: Final rank / 1 / 2 / 3 / 4 / 5 / 6 / 7 / 8 / 9 / 10; Points / 20 / 18 / 17 / 16 / 15 / 14 / 13 / 12 / 11 / 10	Regional Championships: Final rank / 1 / 2 / 3 / 4 / 5; Points / 10 / 8 / 6 / 5 / 4

The following table shows the qualification points earned by each country in both men's and women's junior championships. The points for each championship are cumulative over the last two years.

Qualified teams in bold

Region	Countries	Points for qualification						
Region	Countries	EJCC Women	EJCC Men	PJCC Women	PJCC Men	WJCC Women	WJCC Men	Total
Host Nation	**Norway**	Not required						
North America^{1}	**Canada**					40	37	77
North America^{1}	**United States**					29	27	56
South America^{1}	**Brazil**							0
Asia^{2}	**South Korea**				8	32	13	53
Asia^{2}	**China**			16	8		11	35
Asia^{2}	**Japan**			11	11			22
Oceania	**New Zealand**			11	11			22
Oceania	Australia			8	8			16
Europe	**Switzerland**					32	38	70
Europe	**Great Britain**					30	35	65
Europe	**Sweden**					32	31	63
Europe	**Russia**					30	25	55
Europe	**Italy**	5				11	28	44
Europe	**Czech Republic**		10				23	33
Europe	**Estonia**	3				12	10	25
Europe	**Turkey**	12	9					21
Europe	Austria		5				13	18
Europe	Germany	9	8					17
Europe	Denmark		5			10		15
Europe	Hungary	14						14
Europe	Netherlands		12					12
Europe	Latvia	5	6					11
Europe	Spain	2	8					10
Europe	Poland	10						10
Europe	Finland		1					1

Notes

1. The North American and South American teams are qualified automatically by virtue of their affiliation with the World Curling Federation, since the number of qualification spots equals the number of nations affiliated with the WCF.
2. The Asian teams are qualified as no more than three nations affiliated in the region chose to participate.
