= Kosuke Aita =

Japanese curler

- Curler
- Born: 2 October 1998 (age 28); Kitami, Hokkaido, Japan

Team
- Skip: Kohsuke Hirata
- Third: Shingo Usui
- Second: Ryota Meguro
- Lead: Yoshiya Miura
- Alternate: Kosuke Aita

Curling career
- Member Association: Japan
- World Championship: 2 (2019, 2021)
- Pacific-Asia Championship: 2 (2018, 2019)
- Other appearances: Youth Olympic Games: 1 (2016)
Medal record
Men's curling
Representing Japan
Pacific-Asia Championships
Gold medal – first place	2018 Gangneung
Silver medal – second place	2019 Shenzhen
Representing Hokkaido
Japan Curling Championships
Gold medal – first place	2021 Wakkanai
Silver medal – second place	2018 Nayoro
Silver medal – second place	2023 Tokoro
Bronze medal – third place	2022 Tokoro

Kosuke Aita (born October 2, 1998, in Kitami, Hokkaido, Japan) is a Japanese curler.

== Personal life ==
As of 2021, Aita was a student at the Kitami Institute of Technology.

== Teams and events ==
=== Men's ===
Season	Skip	Third	Second	Lead	Alternate	Coach	Events
2016–17	Yuta Matsumura (Fourth)	Yasumasa Tanida	Shinya Abe (Skip)	Kosuke Aita			
2017–18	Yuta Matsumura (Fourth)	Yasumasa Tanida	Shinya Abe (Skip)	Kosuke Aita			JMCC 2018 (silver)
2018–19	Yuta Matsumura	Tetsuro Shimizu	Yasumasa Tanida	Shinya Abe	Kosuke Aita	Bob Ursel	PACC 2018 (gold); WCC 2019 (4th)
2019–20	Yuta Matsumura	Tetsuro Shimizu	Yasumasa Tanida	Kosuke Aita	Shinya Abe	Bob Ursel	PACC 2019 (silver)
2020–21	Yuta Matsumura	Tetsuro Shimizu	Yasumasa Tanida	Shinya Abe	Kosuke Aita	Bob Ursel	WCC 2021 (9th)
2021–22	Yuta Matsumura	Tetsuro Shimizu	Yasumasa Tanida	Shinya Abe	Kosuke Aita		
2022–23	Kohsuke Hirata	Shingo Usui	Ryota Meguro	Yoshiya Miura	Kosuke Aita		JMCC 2023 (silver)
2023–24	Kohsuke Hirata	Shingo Usui	Ryota Meguro	Yoshiya Miura	Kosuke Aita		

=== Mixed ===
Season	Skip	Third	Second	Lead	Coach	Events
2015–16	Kota Ito	Yako Matsuzawa	Kosuke Aita	Honoka Sasaki	Makoto Tsuruga	WYOG 2016 (15th)

=== Mixed doubles ===
Season	Female	Male	Coach	Events
2015–16	Nadezhda Karelina	Kosuke Aita	Olga Andrianova	WYOG 2016 (9th)
