= Victor Santos (curler) =

Brazilian curler (born 1999)

- Curler
- Born: 19 September 1999 (age 27)

Team
- Curling club: Vancouver CC, Vancouver, BC

Curling career
- Member Association: Brazil
- Other appearances: Youth Olympic Games: 1 (2016)

Victor Santos (born 19 September 1999) is a Brazilian curler.

At the international level, he competed at the 2016 Winter Youth Olympics (finishing 16th with the Brazilian mixed team and 17th on an international mixed doubles team with Laura Engler from Switzerland).

== Teams ==
=== Mixed ===
Season	Skip	Third	Second	Lead	Coach	Events
2015–16	Victor Santos	Raissa Rodrigues	Elian Rocha	Giovanna Barros	Robbie Gallaugher	WYOG 2016 (16th)

=== Mixed doubles ===
Season	Female	Male	Coach	Events
2015–16	(Switzerland) Laura Engler	(Brazil) Victor Santos	Paddy Käser	WYOG 2016 (17th)

== Personal life ==
Santos resides in Sherbrooke, Québec, Canada.
