= Philipp Hösli =

Swiss curler (born 2001)

- Curler
- Born: 28 November 2001 (age 24)

Team
- Curling club: CC Glarus
- Skip: Marco Hösli
- Fourth: Philipp Hösli
- Second: Simon Gloor
- Lead: Justin Hausherr
- Mixed doubles partner: Stefanie Berset

Curling career
- Member Association: Switzerland
- World Championship: 1 (2026)
- World Mixed Doubles Championship: 1 (2026)
- European Championship: 1 (2026)
Medal record
Men's curling
Representing Switzerland
Winter Youth Olympics
Gold medal – first place	2016 Lillehammer	Mixed doubles
Bronze medal – third place	2016 Lillehammer	Mixed team
World Junior Championships
Silver medal – second place	2019 Liverpool
Bronze medal – third place	2018 Aberdeen

Philipp Hösli (born 28 November 2001) is a Swiss curler from Ennenda. He is a two-time World Junior medallist.

== Career ==
=== Juniors ===
In 2016, Hösli was named to the Swiss team for the 2016 Winter Youth Olympics in Lillehammer. He won two medals in the Youth Olympics. The first is the bronze medal in the mixed team event. The second is the gold medal in the mixed doubles event, competing with Yako Matsuzawa from Japan.

In 2018, Hösli won the bronze medal in the World Junior Curling Championships, as the alternate of the team skipped by Jan Hess. He also won the silver medal in 2019 World Junior Curling Championships, playing third for his brother Marco Hösli.

=== Men's ===
Hösli aged out of Juniors during the 2021–22 curling season and again joined his brother, Marco Hösli's rink alongside Marco Hefti and Justin Hausherr. The team started the season by winning the first two World Curling Tour events, the Adelboden International and the WCT Tallinn Mens International Challenger.

Team Hösli would replace Hefti with Simon Gloor during the 2023–24 curling season, and the team would continue to perform well on the World Curling Tour, qualifying for multiple Grand Slam of Curling events. Team Hösli would win their first national men's title at the 2026 Swiss Men's Curling Championship, qualifying to represent Switzerland at the 2026 World Men's Curling Championship. There, they would finish the round robin with a 9–3 record, qualifying for the playoffs and ultimately finishing in 5th place after losing to the United States' John Shuster.

=== Mixed doubles ===
Hösli and teammate Stefanie Berset won the 2026 Swiss Mixed Doubles Curling Championship, and represented Switzerland at the 2026 World Mixed Doubles Curling Championship.

== Teams ==
Season	Skip	Third	Second	Lead	Alternate	Events
2018–19	Marco Hösli	Philipp Hösli	Marco Hefti	Jannis Spiess	Yves Stocker (WJCC)	WJCC 2019 (silver)
2019–20	Marco Hösli	Philipp Hösli	Justin Hausherr	Jannis Spiess		
2020–21	Marco Hösli	Philipp Hösli	Marco Hefti	Justin Hausherr		SMCC 2021 (bronze)
2021–22	Marco Hösli	Philipp Hösli	Marco Hefti	Justin Hausherr		SMCC 2022 (silver)
2022–23	Marco Hösli	Philipp Hösli	Marco Hefti	Justin Hausherr		SMCC 2023 (4th)
2023–24	Marco Hösli	Philipp Hösli	Simon Gloor	Justin Hausherr		SMCC 2024 (4th)
2024–25	Philipp Hösli (Fourth)	Marco Hösli (Skip)	Simon Gloor	Justin Hausherr		SMCC 2025 (silver)
2025–26	Philipp Hösli (Fourth)	Marco Hösli (Skip)	Simon Gloor	Justin Hausherr		SMCC 2026 (gold); WMCC 2026 (5th)
2026–27	Philipp Hösli (Fourth)	Marco Hösli (Skip)	Simon Gloor	Justin Hausherr		
