= Eidsiva Arena =

Arena in Lillehammer, Norway

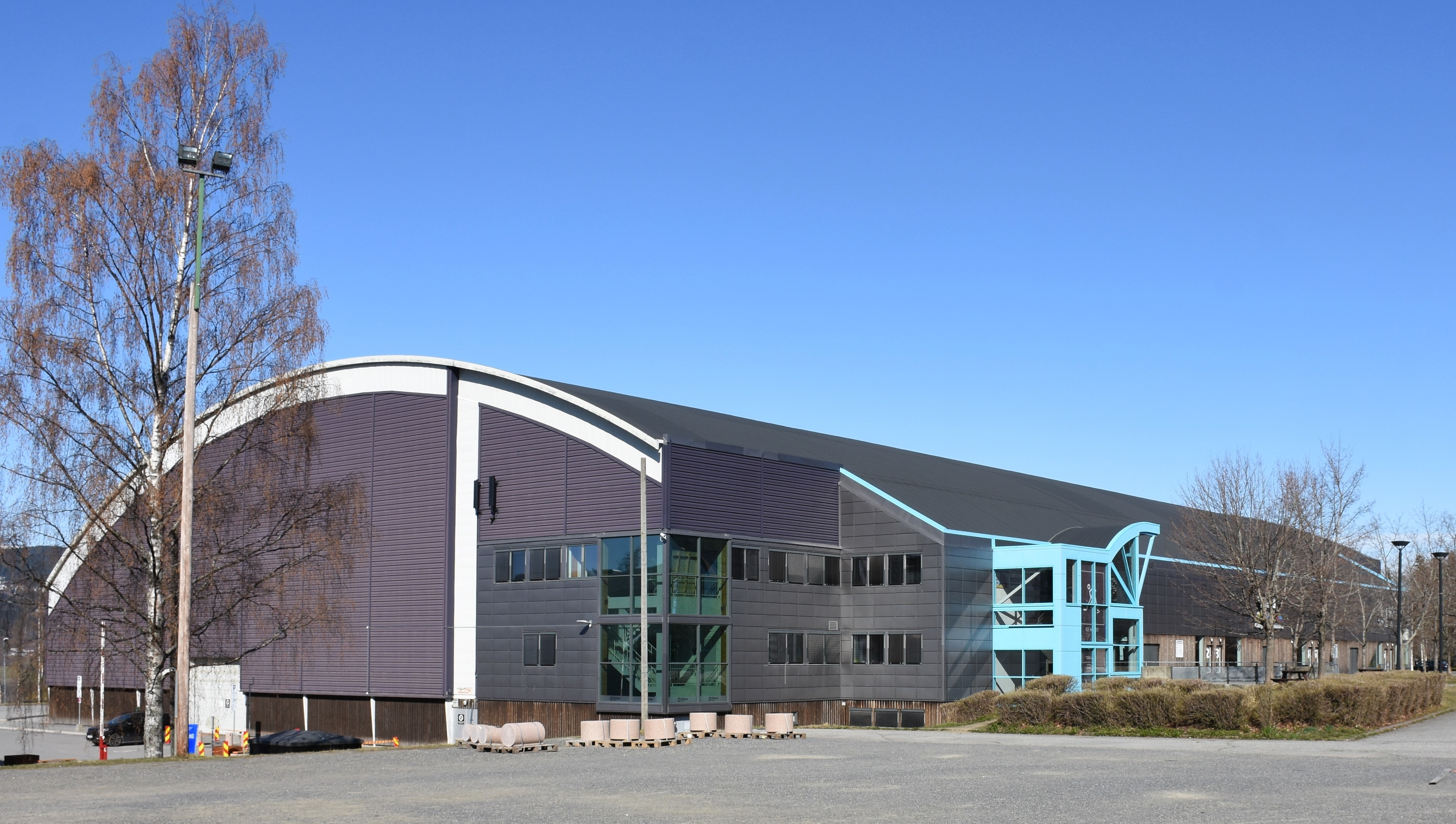
- Interactive map of Eidsiva Arena
- Former names: Kristins Hall (1988-2019)
- Location: Stampesletta, Lillehammer, Norway
- Coordinates: 61°07′24″N 10°28′17″E
- Owner: Lillehammer Municipality
- Capacity: 3,197

Construction
- Opened: 12 December 1988
- Cost: 65 million kr

Tenants
- Lillehammer IK (1988–); 1989 Ice Hockey World Championships Group B 1994 Winter Paralympics; 2016 Winter Youth Olympics

Eidsiva Arena, also known as Kristins Hall, is an arena located at Stampesletta in Lillehammer, Norway. It consists of an ice rink, a combined handball and floorball court, and a curling rink. The venue, owned and operated by the Lillehammer Municipality, opened in 1988 and cost 65 million Norwegian krone (NOK) to build. One of the motivations for its construction was to help Lillehammer's bid to be selected as the host of the 1994 Winter Olympics. The ice rink has a capacity for 3,194 spectators and is the home rink of GET-ligaen hockey club Lillehammer IK. Eidsiva Arena is located next to the larger Håkons Hall, which opened in 1993. During the 1994 Winter Olympics, Kristins Hall was a training rink, and subsequently hosted the ice sledge hockey tournament at the 1994 Winter Paralympics. The venue also co-hosted Group B of the 1989 World Ice Hockey Championships.

During the 2016 Winter Youth Olympics, it hosted the Curling and the Ice hockey competitions.

== Construction ==
Plans for an ice rink in Lillehammer started in the 1980s with the Lillehammer bid for the 1992 Winter Olympics. In 1985, Lillehammer Municipal Council accepted an agreement with the Norwegian Confederation of Sports (NIF), which offered to finance 50 percent of a new multi-use arena in Lillehammer. Combined with the construction of the skiing resort Hafjell, it was part of a plan to document the construction of new venues in and around Lillehammer to help the town secure the right to host the Olympics. The construction received NOK 25 million in state grants. To promote the Olympic bid, the venue was given priority by NIF in their recommendation for use of public grants. In May 1987, the municipal council stated that they did not want to apply to host the B-Group of the 1989 World Ice Hockey Championships, because they feared the venue would not be completed by November 1987. NIF President Hans B. Skaset stated that this could jeopardize the entire Olympic bid if Lillehammer withdrew from arranging such a small event. The decision was changed a week later. The venue opened in December 1988 and cost NOK 65 million.

After Lillehammer was awarded the 1994 Winter Olympics in 1988, it became necessary to build a larger venue to hold the Olympic ice hockey matches. The name of the arena was decided by the Lillehammer Municipal Council in October 1988, as part of a broader branding policy, based on the history of the Birkebeiner. Originally the administration had suggested the new larger hall be named Håkons Hall, after Haakon Haakonarson, later king of Norway, while the smaller hall would be named Sveres Hall, for Sverre Sigurdsson. During the political debate, a number of female councilors suggested that the smaller hall be named Kristins Hall, for Sigurdsson's daughter Kristina Sverresdotter, which was passed by the city council. Kristin and Håkon would be used to name the mascots for the Olympics. Kristins Hall has had small renovations throughout the years, including an upgrade in 2007 which included new ice hockey sideboards, a new ice machine, a new lighting system, and a new handball floor. On April 25, 2018, Lillehammer IK was given permission to sell the name "Kristins Hall" to an investing company in the upcoming future, this may allow the financial support for a potential jumbotron or new seating. In December 2018, new lighting was introduced in the rafters of the arena, allowing a more exciting atmosphere for the spectators.

On January 31, 2019, Lillehammer IK along with the Lillehammer Municipal Council completed a deal with Eidsiva Energi for 6 million NOK (1,2 million for 5 years) to give the name rights to Eidisva. The new arena name is Eidsiva Arena and the deal will commence on May 1, 2019. The deal will start a renovation process in Kristins Hall, including a new roof, new seating and a video scoreboard.

== Facilities ==
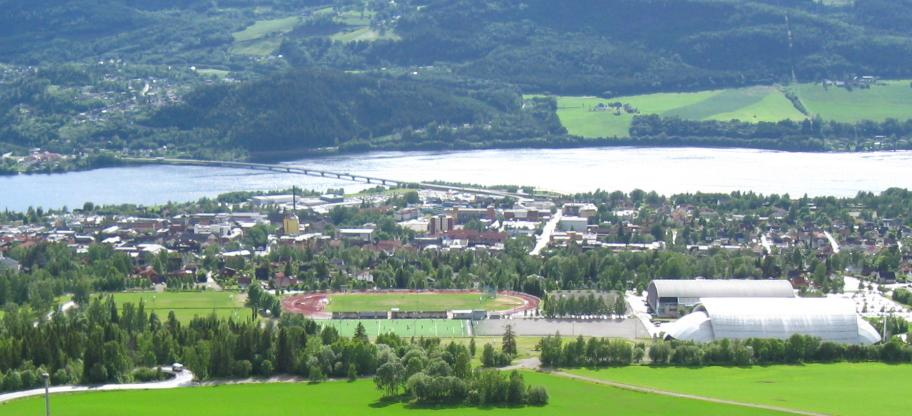
Stampesletta with Eidsiva Arena located behind Håkons Hall to the right

The municipally owns and operates venue is located at Stampesletta, about 1 kilometer (0.62 mi) from the town center of Lillehammer, Norway. With a gross area of 9,000 square meters (97,000 sq ft), it consists of three main sections: an ice hockey rink, a combined handball and floorball court, and a curling rink. The venue has eight locker rooms, of which two are designed for judges and referees, a weight room, a 100-meter (330 ft) long, four-track sprint track, meeting rooms, three kiosks, VIP facilities and a cafeteria. The handball hall has an artificial surface measuring 22 by 44 meters (72 by 144 ft).

The ice rink is certified by the Norwegian Ice Hockey Association to hold 3,197 spectators, but can accommodate up to 4,000 people in special circumstances. The cooling and heating systems for Håkons Hall and Eidsiva Arena are connected, allowing them to function as energy reserves for each other.

== Tenants and events ==
The ice rink is the home of Lillehammer IK, which plays in GET-ligaen, the premier ice hockey league in Norway. During the season, they play one to two home games per week, typically attracting crowds of 1,000 to 1,500 spectators. They inaugurated the arena in December 1988 with a game against Oshaug. The ice rink is also used by the Norwegian College of Elite Sport in Lillehammer and Lillehammer Kunstløpklubb. The handball court is used by Lillehammer Innebandyklubb and Lillehammerstudentenes IL, while the curling rink is used by Lillehammer Curlingklubb. The venue is owned and operated by Lillehammer Municipality.

The official opening of the venue took place on 12 December 1988, when Norway played ice hockey against West Germany. Kristins Hall held two more Norwegian friendly internationals during the season, before it was host to the B-Group during the 1989 World Ice Hockey Championships. Ten games were played in Lillehammer, including the opening game between Norway and Japan, while 18 games were played in Oslo. During the 1994 Winter Olympics, Kristins Hall was used as a training venue for the ice hockey teams, which played their games at Håkons Hall and Gjøvik Olympic Cavern Hall. During the 1994 Winter Paralympics, Kristins Hall hosted the ice sledge hockey tournament. The arena was used once again for the 2016 Winter Youth Olympics, where it hosted the curling and ice hockey competitions. For this, the arena expanded their curling rink to satisfy international requirements, and incremented their spectator capacity.

== See also ==
- List of indoor arenas in Norway
- List of indoor ice rinks in Norway
