= Laura Engler =

Swiss curler (born 1999)

- Curler
- Born: 16 October 1999 (age 27); Lutzenberg

Team
- Mixed doubles partner: Kevin Wunderlin

Curling career
- Member Association: Switzerland
Medal record
Women's curling
Representing Switzerland
Youth Olympics
Bronze medal – third place	2016 Lillehammer	Mixed team
World Junior Championships
Bronze medal – third place	2019 Liverpool

Laura Engler (born October 16, 1999) is a Swiss curler from St. Gallen.

== Career ==
Engler was selected as a member of the Swiss mixed team at the 2016 Winter Youth Olympics. Engler threw second stones on the team, which was skipped by Selina Witschonke. The team finished the round robin with a 6–1 record, finishing second in their pool. They then beat Sweden 7–3 in the quarter-finals before dropping the semifinal 7–5 to Canada. They won the bronze medal with an 11–3 defeat over Russia. In the mixed doubles event, she was paired with Brazil's Victor Santos. The two lost in their only game, losing 9–1 to Zhao Ruiyi of China and Andreas Hårstad of Norway.

Engler played for Switzerland in three straight World Junior Curling Championships from 2017 to 2019. In 2017, she was the team's alternate and did not play in any games. The team, skipped by Witschonke went 5–4 in group play, before losing to South Korea in a tiebreaker. After winning the 2018 Swiss Junior Curling Championships as a member of the Raphaela Keiser rink, she was invited to be the Swiss team's alternate again at the 2018 World Junior Curling Championships. Despite being the alternate, she saw action in seven matches. The team, still skipped by Witschonke went 4–5, and missed the playoffs. As Swiss Junior champions from 2018, the Keiser rink earned the right to represent Switzerland at the 2019 World Junior Curling Championships. The team added Witschonke to the team, throwing last rocks, with Keiser at third (but still skipping) and Engler at second. Through the round robin, the team finished third overall with a 6–3 record, qualifying for the playoffs for the first time. After losing 8–2 in the semifinal against Canada, the team rebounded in the bronze medal game by stealing two in the tenth end to upend China 6–4 and secure Switzerland's first women's world junior medal since 2015.

After her junior career, Engler began playing mixed doubles curling, first playing with Marco Hefti. In 2023, she paired up with Kevin Wunderlin, and won her first World Curling Tour event at the Prague Open.

== Personal life ==
Engler is originally from Lutzenberg, and moved to St. Gallen before 2018. Her mother Gabi, father Roger and grandfather were involved in the sport, with her father coaching her women's junior team, and her grandfather being president of the St. Gallen Curling Club. She is a graduate of the Appenzellerland Sports School, where she was also a rower. She also attended the Trogen Cantonal School, where she studied biology and chemistry.
