= Han Yu (curler) =

Chinese curler (born 2000)

- Curler
- Born: October 6, 2000 (age 26); Beijing, China

Team
- Curling club: CSO CC, Beijing
- Skip: Wang Rui
- Third: Han Yu
- Second: Dong Ziqi
- Lead: Jiang Jiayi
- Alternate: Su Tingyu
- Mixed doubles partner: Yu Sen

Curling career
- Member Association: China
- World Championship: 3 (2021, 2025, 2026)
- World Mixed Doubles Championship: 2 (2025, 2026)
- Pacific-Asia Championship: 1 (2019)
- Pan Continental Championship: 2 (2024, 2025)
- Olympic: 2 (2022, 2026)
- Other appearances: Asian Winter Games: 1 (2025); World Mixed Championship: 1 (2017), World Junior Championships: 1 (2019), Youth Olympic Games: 1 (2016)
Medal record
Curling
Representing China
World Women's Championship
Bronze medal – third place	2025 Uijeongbu
Asian Winter Games
Silver medal – second place	2025 Harbin	Women's
Bronze medal – third place	2025 Harbin	Mixed doubles
Pan Continental Championships
Gold medal – first place	2025 Virginia	Women's
Bronze medal – third place	2024 Lacombe	Women's
Pacific-Asia Curling Championships
Gold medal – first place	2019 Shenzhen	Women's
Youth Olympic Games
Silver medal – second place	2016 Lillehammer	Mixed doubles
Winter Universiade
Gold medal – first place	2023 Saranac Lake	Women's

Han Yu (Chinese: 韩雨; pinyin: Hán Yǔ, born October 6, 2000, in Beijing) is a Chinese curler. She currently plays third on Team Wang Rui.

== Career ==
=== Juniors ===
Han represented China at the 2019 World Junior Curling Championships throwing fourth stones for Jiang Jiayi. The team went 8-1 through the round robin, which earned them the number one seed in the playoffs. In the playoffs, they lost the semi-final to Russia's Vlada Rumiantseva and the bronze medal game to Switzerland, settling for fourth place.

=== Women's ===
Han, even though she was still of junior age, skipped the Chinese national team to a gold medal at the 2019 Pacific-Asia Curling Championships following a 10–3 victory over Japan's Seina Nakajima. The victory earned a spot for China at the 2020 World Women's Curling Championship, which was cancelled due to COVID-19. A year later, Han skipped China at the 2021 World Women's Curling Championship, finishing tenth with a 6–7 record. Han would skip the Chinese team on home soil at the 2022 Winter Olympics, where the team would finish 4–5 in the round-robin, finishing 7th.

Han would then return to international curling as third on the Chinese national team, skipped by Wang Rui at 2024 Pan Continental Curling Championships, where the team would win a bronze medal, qualifying them to return for the 2025 World Women's Curling Championship. In preparation for the World Championships, they would also represent China at the 2025 Asian Winter Games, where they won a silver medal, losing to South Korea's Gim Eun-ji 7–2 in the final. At the 2025 Worlds, the team finished the round robin with a 7–5 record, and would go on to win a bronze medal, this time beating Gim 9–4 in the bronze medal game. This bronze medal performance also qualified the Chinese women's team for the 2026 Winter Olympics.

During the 2025–26 season, Team Wang would participate in their first Grand Slam of Curling event at the 2025 Masters. At the event, Wang would finish with a 1–3 record. The team would then go on to represent China at the 2025 Pan Continental Curling Championships, where they would have an impressive week, going undefeated in the tournament and beating Canada's Rachel Homan 7–6 in the final.

=== Mixed doubles ===
Han teamed up with Wang Zhiyu to compete in mixed doubles during the 2024–25 curling season. The pair would find immediate success, representing China as the home team at the 2025 Asian Winter Games where they finished 3rd, beating the Philippines 6–5 in the bronze medal game. Han and Wang would also represent China at the 2025 World Mixed Doubles Curling Championship.

== Personal life ==
Han attended Beijing Sport University.

== Teams ==
=== Women's ===
Season	Skip	Third	Second	Lead	Alternate	Coach	Events
2018–19	Han Yu (Fourth)	Jiang Jiayi (Skip)	Zhao Ruiyi	Shang Yining	Ding Yuexin	Perry Marshall	WJCC 2019 (4th)
2019–20	Han Yu	Zhang Lijun	Jiang Xindi	Zhao Ruiyi	Yu Jiaxin	Marco Mariani, Sören Grahn	PACC 2019 (gold)
2019–20	Han Yu	Zhang Lijun	Jiang Xindi	Yu Jiaxin	Dong Ziqi	Marco Mariani	
2020–21	Han Yu	Dong Ziqi	Zhang Lijun	Jiang Xindi	Yan Hui	Marco Mariani, Sören Grahn	WWCC 2021 (10th)
2021–22	Han Yu	Wang Rui	Dong Ziqi	Zhang Lijun	Jiang Xindi	Marco Mariani, Sören Grahn	WOG 2022 (7th)
2023–24	Han Yu	Wang Meini	Tian Linyuan	Yu Jiaxin	Wang Rui (PCCC)		PCCCB 2023 (gold)
2024–25	Wang Rui	Han Yu	Dong Ziqi	Jiang Jiayi	Su Tingyu	Zang Jialiang	PCCC 2024 (bronze); AWG 2025 (silver); WWCC 2025 (bronze)

=== Mixed ===
Season	Skip	Third	Second	Lead	Coach	Events
2015–16	Du Hongrui	Zhao Ruiyi	Zhang Wenxin	Han Yu	Liu Yin	WYOG 2016 (11th)
2017–18	Liu Sijia	Ling Zhi	Han Yu	Wang Weihaoping	Xu Lingli	WMxCC 2017 (9th)

=== Mixed doubles ===
Season	Female	Male	Events
2015–16	Han Yu	Ross Whyte	WYOG 2016 (silver)
2024–25	Han Yu	Wang Zhiyu	AWG 2025 (bronze); WMDCC 2025 (17th)
2025–26	Han Yu	Yu Sen	WMDCC 2026 (12th)
