= Ice hockey at the 2016 Winter Youth Olympics – Girls' team rosters =

These were the team rosters of the nations participating in the Girls' ice hockey tournament of the 2016 Winter Youth Olympics. Each team was permitted a roster of 15 skaters and 2 goaltenders.

== Czech Republic ==
The following is the Czech roster for the Girls' ice hockey tournament at the 2016 Winter Youth Olympics.

Head coach: Rudolf Valla

- Kristýna Bláhová
- Nikola Dýcková
- Magdalena Erbenová
- Martina Exnerová
- Alexandra Halounová
- Sandra Halounová
- Karolina Hornická
- Karolina Kotounová
- Klára Jandušíková
- Karolína Juřicová
- Anna Kotounová
- Šárka Krejníková
- Laura Lerchová
- Veronika Lorencová
- Barbora Machalová
- Natálie Mlýnková
- Adéla Škrdlová

== Norway ==
The following is the Norwegian roster for the Girls' ice hockey tournament at the 2016 Winter Youth Olympics.

Head coach: Laura Rollins

- Ingrid Berge
- Marthe Brunvold
- Nora Christophersen
- Mabel Endrerud
- Karen Forgaard
- Hedda Håvarstein
- Mia Isdahl
- Karen Jensen
- Thea Jørgensen
- Stine Kjellesvik
- Maren Knudsen
- Kaja Kristensen
- Malin Kristensen
- Ena Marie Nystrøm
- Emilie Olsen
- Kamilla Olsen
- Millie Sirum

== Slovakia ==
The following is the Slovak roster for the Girls' ice hockey tournament at the 2016 Winter Youth Olympics.

Head coach: Andrej Schöber

- Patrícia Agostonová
- Paula Cagáňová
- Alexandra Čorňáková
- Michaela Hájniková
- Kinga Horváthová
- Klaudia Kleinová
- Barbora Koysová
- Lívia Kubeková
- Nina Kučerková
- Simona Ležovičová
- Zuzana Majeríková
- Sylvia Maťašová
- Andrea Rišianová
- Nikola Rumanová
- Dominika Sedláková
- Laura Sulíková
- Diana Vargová

== Switzerland ==
The following is the Suiss roster for the Girls' ice hockey tournament at the 2016 Winter Youth Olympics.

Head coach: Andrea Kröni

- Sina Bachmann
- Sydney Berta
- Tina Brand
- Yaël Brich
- Oona Emmenegger
- Rahel Enzler
- Ramona Forrer
- Justine Forster
- Janine Hauser
- Saskia Maurer
- Lisa Rüedi
- Noemi Ryhner
- Jessica Schlegel
- Gionina Spiess
- Nicole Vallario
- Stefanie Wetli
- Lara Zimmermann

== Sweden ==
The following is the Sweden roster for the Girls' ice hockey tournament at the 2016 Winter Youth Olympics.

Head coach: Ylva Lindberg

- Anna Amholt
- Josefin Bouveng
- Fanny Brolin
- Jennifer Carlsson
- Wilma Carlsson
- Julia Gustafsson
- Therese Järnkrok
- Lina Ljungblom
- Sofie Lundin
- Ronja Mogren
- Maja Nylén Persson
- Linnea Sjölund
- Madelene Strömgren
- Mina Waxin
- Madelen Westerlund
- Agnes Wilhelmsson
- Ethel Wilhelmsson
