= Ice hockey at the 2016 Winter Youth Olympics =

Ice hockey at the II Winter Youth Olympic Games
- Venue: Kristins Hall, Lillehammer
- Dates: 12–21 February

Ice hockey at the 2016 Winter Youth Olympics was held at Kristins Hall in Lillehammer, Norway from 12 to 21 February. The difference between the Youth Olympic program for ice hockey and the Winter Olympics was the addition of a skill challenge for each gender.

== Medal summary ==
=== Medal table ===
Rank	Nation	Gold	Silver	Bronze	Total
1	Japan	1	0	0	1
1	Romania	1	0	0	1
1	Sweden	1	0	0	1
1	United States	1	0	0	1
5	Canada	0	1	0	1
5	Czech Republic	0	1	0	1
5	Italy	0	1	0	1
5	Slovakia	0	1	0	1
9	Austria	0	0	1	1
9	Finland	0	0	1	1
9	Germany	0	0	1	1
9	Russia	0	0	1	1
9	Switzerland	0	0	1	1
Totals (13 entries)		4	4	5	13

=== Events ===
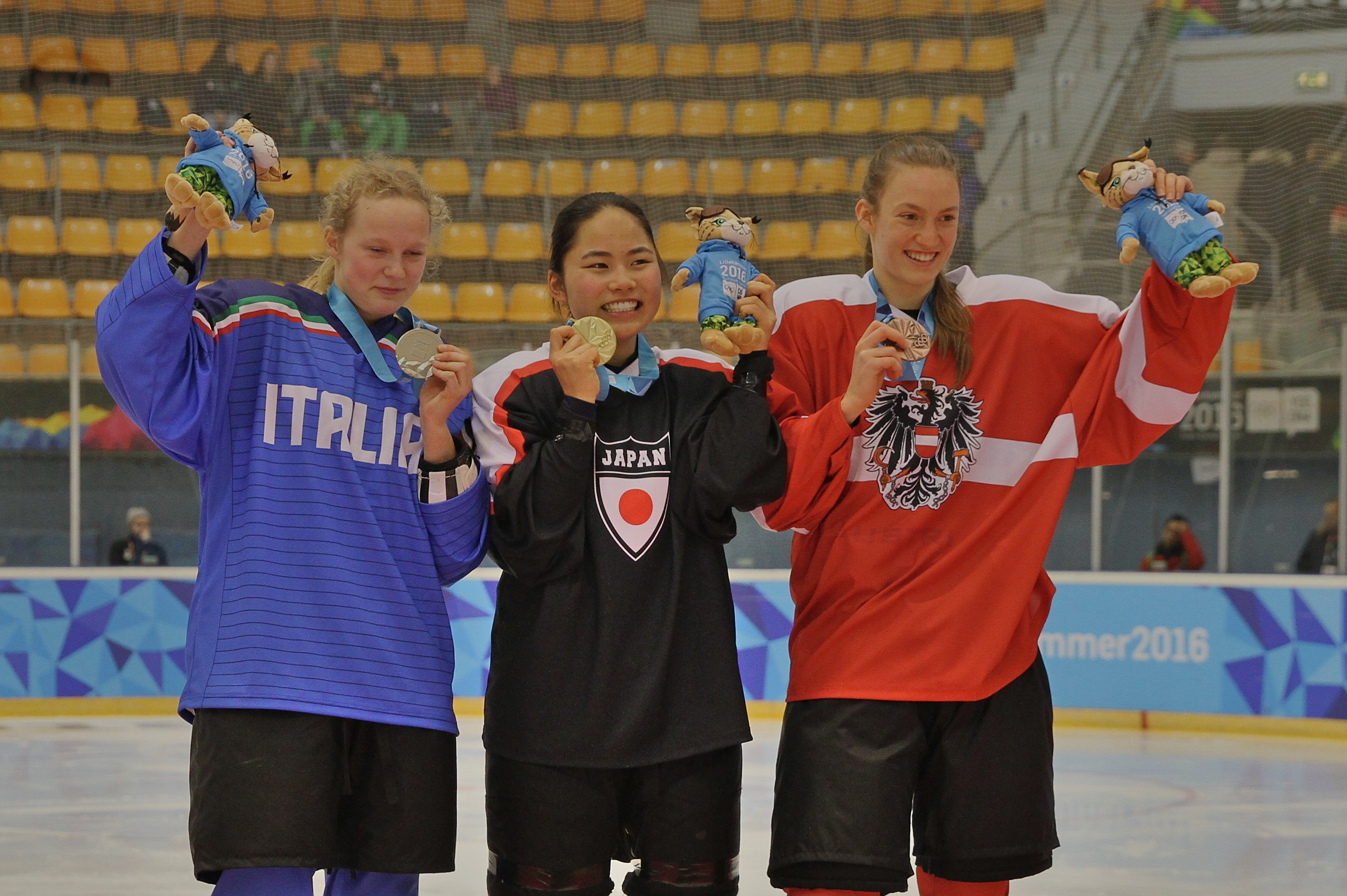
Girls' individual skills challenge medalists

Event	Gold		Silver		Bronze	
Boys' tournament	United States; Jack DeBoer; Drew DeRidder; Ty Emberson; Jonathan Gruden; Christian Krygier; Will MacKinnon; Erik Middendorf; Jacob Pivonka; Adam Samuelsson; Mattias Samuelsson; Ryan Savage; Todd Scott; Jacob Semik; Oliver Wahlstrom; T. J. Walsh; Tyler Weiss; Jake Wise		Canada; Luka Burzan; Dennis Busby; Declan Chisholm; Aidan Dudas; Alexis Gravel; Benoit-Olivier Groulx; Carson Focht; Gabriel Fortier; Anderson MacDonald; Jared McIsaac; Allan McShane; Ryan Merkley; Tristen Nielsen; Connor Roberts; Olivier Rodrigue; Ty Smith; Jett Woo		Russia; Gleb Babintsev; Maxim Denezhkin; Grigori Denisenko; Georgi Dubrovski; Alexander Khovanov; Vladislav Kotkov; Pavel Kupchikhin; Anton Malyshev; Amir Miftakhov; Kirill Nizhnikov; Pavel Rotenberg; Ilyas Sitdikov; Yegor Sokolov; Andrei Svechnikov; Alexander Zhabreyev; Bogdan Zhilyakov; Danil Zhuravlyov	
Boys' individual skills challenge	Eduard Cășăneanu; Romania	14	Sebastián Čederle; Slovakia	12	Erik Betzold; Germany	11
Boys' individual skills challenge	Eduard Cășăneanu; Romania	14	Sebastián Čederle; Slovakia	12	Aleks Haatanen; Finland	12
Girls' tournament	Sweden; Anna Amholt; Josefin Bouveng; Fanny Brolin; Jennifer Carlsson; Wilma Carlsson; Julia Gustafsson; Therese Järnkrok; Lina Ljungblom; Sofie Lundin; Ronja Mogren; Maja Nylén Persson; Linnéa Sjölund; Madelene Strömgren; Mina Waxin; Madelen Westerlund; Agnes Wilhelmsson; Ethel Wilhelmsson		Czech Republic; Kristýna Bláhová; Nikola Dýcková; Magdalena Erbenová; Martina Exnerová; Alexandra Halounová; Sandra Halounová; Karolína Hornická; Karolína Hrdinová; Klára Jandušíková; Karolína Juřicová; Anna Kotounová; Šárka Krejníková; Laura Lerchová; Veronika Lorencová; Barbora Machalová; Natálie Mlýnková; Adéla Škrdlová		Switzerland; Sina Bachmann; Sydney Berta; Tina Brand; Yaël Brich; Oona Emmenegger; Rahel Enzler; Ramona Forrer; Justine Forster; Janine Hauser; Saskia Maurer; Lisa Rüedi; Noemi Ryhner; Jessica Schlegel; Gionina Spiess; Nicole Vallario; Stefanie Wetli; Lara Zimmermann	
Girls' individual skills challenge	Sena Takenaka; Japan	16	Anita Muraro; Italy	14	Theresa Schafzahl; Austria	13

== Qualification system ==
There were ten teams in total (five per gender), with 17 players on each team. Participating nations were able to select whether they wished to participate in either the men's or women's ice hockey tournament according to the running order based on a joint under-18 world ranking established after the Men's and Women's U18 World Championships in 2015. Norway, as the host nation, was allowed to participate with one team of each gender.

For the skills challenge, the host nation was allowed to send one competitor of each gender. For the remaining competitors, national competitions were held, and the qualifiers attended a Global Skills Challenge at the 2015 Hockey Development Camp in Vierumäki, Finland.

=== Boys ===
- United States
- Canada
- Russia
- Finland
- Norway (hosts)

=== Girls ===
- Czech Republic
- Sweden
- Switzerland
- Slovakia
- Norway (hosts)

=== Skills challenge ===
The following athletes have qualified:

Event	Boys'	Girls'
Host nation	Norway	Norway
Skills challenge qualifier	Germany; Slovakia; Austria; France; Finland; Hungary; Canada; Belarus; Australia; Lithuania; Netherlands; Chinese Taipei; Japan; Romania; New Zealand	Japan; Australia; Argentina; Germany; Italy; Austria; South Korea; Finland; Belgium; Slovakia; Netherlands; Belarus; Great Britain; Poland; Romania
Total	16	16
