= Sweden at the 2016 Winter Youth Olympics =

- IOC code: SWE
- NOC: Swedish Olympic Committee
- Website: www.sok.se (in Swedish and English)

in Lillehammer
- Competitors: 39 in 10 sports
- Flag bearer: Erika Lindgren
- Medals Ranked 9th: Gold 3 Silver 2 Bronze 0 Total 5

Winter Youth Olympics appearances (overview)
- 2012; 2016; 2020; 2024

Sweden competed at the 2016 Winter Youth Olympics in Lillehammer, Norway from 12 to 21 February 2016. The Swedish Olympic Committee revealed the team at 18 January 2016.

== Medalists ==
Medal	Name	Sport	Event	Date
Gold	Moa Lundgren	Cross-country skiing	Girls' cross-country cross	13 February
Gold	Johanna Hagström	Cross-country skiing	Girls' sprint	16 February
Gold	Sweden women's national under-16 ice hockey team: Anna Amholt; Josefin Bouveng; Fanny Brolin; Jennifer Carlsson; Wilma Carlsson; Julia Gustafsson; Therese Järnkrok; Lina Ljungblom; Sofie Lundin; Ronja Mogren; Maja Nylén Persson; Linnéa Sjölund; Madelene Strömgren; Mina Waxin; Madelen Westerlund; Agnes Wilhelmsson; Ethel Wilhelmsson	Ice hockey	Girls' tournament	21 February
Silver	Johanna Hagström	Cross-country skiing	Girls' cross-country cross	13 February
Silver	Filip Vennerström	Alpine skiing	Boys' slalom	19 February

=== Medalists in mixed NOCs events ===
Medal	Name	Sport	Event	Date
Bronze	Veronica Edebo; David Mobärg	Snowboarding	Team snowboard ski cross	16 February

== Alpine skiing ==
Boys

Athlete	Event	Run 1		Run 2		Total	
Athlete	Event	Time	Rank	Time	Rank	Time	Rank
Filip Vennerström	Slalom	49.65	2	49.12	2	1:38.77	2nd place, silver medalist(s)
Filip Vennerström	Giant slalom	1:19.77	12	did not finish			
Filip Vennerström	Super-G	—N/a				did not finish	
Filip Vennerström	Combined	1:13.60	21	40.32	1	1:53.92	4

Girls

Athlete	Event	Run 1		Run 2		Total	
Athlete	Event	Time	Rank	Time	Rank	Time	Rank
Jonna Luthman	Slalom	57.69	14	did not finish			
Jonna Luthman	Giant slalom	did not finish					
Jonna Luthman	Super-G	—N/a				1:14.66	11
Jonna Luthman	Combined	DNF		did not advance			

Mixed

Athletes	Event	Round of 16	Quarterfinals	Semifinals	Final	
Athletes	Event	Opposition Result	Opposition Result	Opposition Result	Opposition Result	Rank
Filip Vennerström; Jonna Luthman	Parallel team	Stockinger/Rispler (GER); L 2 – 2^{+}	did not advance			

== Biathlon ==
Boys

Athlete	Event	Time	Misses	Rank
Emil Simonsson	Sprint	21:32.2	5	31
Emil Simonsson	Pursuit	34:22.0	9	33
Henning Sjökvist	Sprint	20:55.7	2	21
Henning Sjökvist	Pursuit	32:50.1	7	23

Girls

Athlete	Event	Time	Misses	Rank
Moa Olsson	Sprint	19:54.9	2	20
Moa Olsson	Pursuit	29:02.2	6	24
Sanna Sjödén	Sprint	20:31.0	5	25
Sanna Sjödén	Pursuit	27:23.2	4	15

Mixed

Athletes	Event	Time	Misses	Rank
Sanna Sjödén; Henning Sjökvist	Single mixed relay	42:58.7	4+15	8
Emil Simonsson; Henning Sjökvist; Moa Olsson; Sanna Sjödén	Mixed relay	1:25:37.8	5+11	11

== Cross-country skiing ==
Boys

Athlete	Event	Qualification		Quarterfinal		Semifinal		Final	
Athlete	Event	Time	Rank	Time	Rank	Time	Rank	Time	Rank
Adam Persson	10 km freestyle	—N/a						25:46.0	21
Adam Persson	Classical sprint	2:58.36	4 Q	3:00.51	1 Q	2:55.59	2 Q	3:16.58	6
Adam Persson	Cross-country cross	3:07.93	6 Q	—N/a		3:06.88	2 Q	3:03.95	4
Eric Rosjö	10 km freestyle	—N/a						25:15.0	9
Eric Rosjö	Classical sprint	3:08.51	19 Q	3:11.75	4	did not advance			
Eric Rosjö	Cross-country cross	3:16.66	20 Q	—N/a		3:24.19	10	did not advance	

Girls

Athlete	Event	Qualification		Quarterfinal		Semifinal		Final	
Athlete	Event	Time	Rank	Time	Rank	Time	Rank	Time	Rank
Johanna Hagström	5 km freestyle	—N/a						13:39.5	4
Johanna Hagström	Classical sprint	3:24.38	1 Q	3:28.56	1 Q	3:23.59	1 Q	3:19.55	1st place, gold medalist(s)
Johanna Hagström	Cross-country cross	3:31.35	2 Q	—N/a		3:33.90	1 Q	3:28.09	2nd place, silver medalist(s)
Moa Lundgren	5 km freestyle	—N/a						13:51.7	9
Moa Lundgren	Classical sprint	3:32.40	5 Q	3:28.68	2 Q	3:28.00	2 Q	3:25.99	4
Moa Lundgren	Cross-country cross	3:27.59	1 Q	—N/a		3:35.11	1 Q	3:26.35	1st place, gold medalist(s)

== Curling ==
=== Mixed team ===
Team: Johan Nygren (skip), Anton Degerfeldt, Tova Pettersson, Jenny Jonasson

Round Robin

Group B	Skip	W	L
Canada	Mary Fay	7	0
Great Britain	Ross Whyte	6	1
Sweden	Johan Nygren	5	2
Norway	Maia Ramsfjell	4	3
South Korea	Hong Yun-jeong	3	4
Czech Republic	Pavel Mareš	2	5
Estonia	Eiko-Siim Peips	1	6
Brazil	Victor Santos	0	7

Draw 1

Sheet B	1	2	3	4	5	6	7	8	9	Final
Sweden (Nygren)	0	2	0	1	0	1	0	3	1	8
Norway (Ramsfjell) 🔨	2	0	1	0	2	0	2	0	0	7

Draw 2

Sheet D	1	2	3	4	5	6	7	8	Final
Sweden (Nygren) 🔨	5	3	1	2	4	2	X	X	17
Brazil (Santos)	0	0	0	0	0	0	X	X	0

Draw 3

Sheet C	1	2	3	4	5	6	7	8	Final
South Korea (Hong)	1	0	1	1	0	0	0	X	3
Sweden (Nygren)🔨	0	2	0	0	3	1	1	X	7

Draw 4

Sheet A	1	2	3	4	5	6	7	8	Final
Sweden (Nygren) 🔨	0	2	0	0	0	0	1	0	3
Canada (Fay)	0	0	3	0	0	0	0	2	5

Draw 5

Sheet C	1	2	3	4	5	6	7	8	Final
Sweden (Nygren)	0	1	0	0	1	0	X	X	2
Great Britain (Whyte) 🔨	4	0	2	1	0	1	X	X	8

Draw 6

Sheet A	1	2	3	4	5	6	7	8	9	Final
Czech Republic (Mareš)	0	2	0	0	0	0	1	1	0	4
Sweden (Nygren) 🔨	2	0	0	1	0	1	0	0	1	5

Draw 7

Sheet D	1	2	3	4	5	6	7	8	Final
Sweden (Nygren)	1	1	0	2	0	0	4	X	8
Estonia (Peips) 🔨	0	0	1	0	1	1	0	X	3

Quarterfinals

Sheet D	1	2	3	4	5	6	7	8	Final
Switzerland (Witschonke) 🔨	2	0	1	0	2	2	0	X	7
Sweden (Nygren)	0	0	0	1	0	0	2	X	3

=== Mixed doubles ===
Athletes	Event	Round of 32	Round of 16	Quarterfinals	Semifinals	Final / BM	
Athletes	Event	Opposition Result	Opposition Result	Opposition Result	Opposition Result	Opposition Result	Rank
Kristina Podrabska (CZE); Anton Degerfeldt (SWE)	Mixed doubles	Flannery (USA) / Ito (JPN); W 8 – 7	Witschonke (SUI) / Gustsin (EST); L 1 – 11	did not advance			
Jenny Jonasson (SWE); Du Hongrui (CHN)	Mixed doubles	Barros (BRA) / Richardson (USA); L 4 – 8	did not advance				
Lee Ji-young (KOR); Johan Nygren (SWE)	Mixed doubles	Farrell (USA) / Smith (NZL); W 8 – 1	Zhao (CHN) / Haarstad (NOR); L 6 – 11	did not advance			
Tova Petterson (SWE); Alberto Zisa (ITA)	Mixed doubles	Sillaots (EST) / Violette (USA); L 4 – 7	did not advance				

== Freestyle skiing ==
Ski cross

Athlete	Event	Qualification		Group heats		Semifinal	Final
Athlete	Event	Time	Rank	Points	Rank	Position	Position
David Mobärg	Boys' ski cross	42.86	1 Q	19	2 Q	4 FB	5
Veronica Edebo	Girls' ski cross	46.31	5	18	1 Q	3 FB	5

Slopestyle

Athlete	Event	Final			
Athlete	Event	Run 1	Run 2	Best	Rank
Emil Granbom	Boys' slopestyle	77.80	17.60	77.80	8

== Ice hockey ==
=== Girls' tournament ===
Roster

- Anna Amholt
- Josefin Bouveng
- Fanny Brolin
- Jennifer Carlsson
- Wilma Carlsson
- Julia Gustafsson
- Therese Järnkrok
- Lina Ljungblom
- Sofie Lundin
- Ronja Mogren
- Maja Nylén Persson
- Linnea Sjölund
- Madelene Strömgren
- Mina Waxin
- Madelen Westerlund
- Agnes Wilhelmsson
- Ethel Wilhelmsson

Pos	Team	Pld	W	OTW	OTL	L	GF	GA	GD	Pts	Qualification
1	Sweden	4	2	1	1	0	10	3	+7	9	Advance to semifinals
2	Czech Republic	4	3	0	0	1	7	4	+3	9	Advance to semifinals
3	Switzerland	4	2	1	0	1	10	6	+4	8	Advance to semifinals
4	Slovakia	4	1	0	1	2	6	9	−3	4	Advance to semifinals
5	Norway	4	0	0	0	4	2	13	−11	0	

Updated to match(es) played on unknown. Source:

13 February 2016; 20:00	Sweden	1–2 GWS (1–0, 0–0, 0–1) (SO: 0–1)	Switzerland	Youth Hall, Lillehammer; Attendance: 184

Anna Amholt
Goalies
Saskia Maurer
Referee:
(United States) Samantha Hiller
Linesmen:
(Netherlands) Loraine Mollen
(Finland) Jenna Puhakka

Lundin (Carlsson) – 11:21	1–0
	1–1	Rüdi (Enzler) (PP) – 38:07
	1–2	Ryhner (GWG) – 45:00

3 min
Penalties
4.5 min
18
Shots
18

15 February 2016; 17:00	Sweden	2–1 GWS (1–0, 0–1, 0–0) (SO: 1–0)	Slovakia	Youth Hall, Lillehammer; Attendance: 160

Anna Amholt
Goalies
Simona Lezovicova
Referee:
(Russia) Daria Abrosimova
Linesmen:
(Norway) Marion Dahl Strand
(Switzerland) Leticia Tscherrig

Ljungblom (Lundin) – 07:38	1–0
	1–1	Cornakova (Agostonova) – 28:26
W. Carlsson (GWG) – 45:00	2–1

9 min
Penalties
4.5 min
26
Shots
14

16 February 2016; 14:00	Czech Republic	0–2 (0–0, 0–1, 0–1)	Sweden	Youth Hall, Lillehammer; Attendance: 77

Karolina Juricova	Goalies	Anna Amholt	Referee: (Canada) Vanessa Ley; Linesmen: (Germany) Jacqueline Sauer (Switzerland) Leticia Tscherrig
0–1 / Ljungblom (Bouveng)– 24:02; 0–2 / Bouveng (ENG) – 44:24			Referee: (Canada) Vanessa Ley; Linesmen: (Germany) Jacqueline Sauer (Switzerland) Leticia Tscherrig
6 min	Penalties	4.5 min	Referee: (Canada) Vanessa Ley; Linesmen: (Germany) Jacqueline Sauer (Switzerland) Leticia Tscherrig
12	Shots	20	Referee: (Canada) Vanessa Ley; Linesmen: (Germany) Jacqueline Sauer (Switzerland) Leticia Tscherrig

18 February 2016; 14:00	Norway	0–5 (0–2, 0–1, 0–2)	Sweden	Kristins Hall, Lillehammer; Attendance: 1,252

Mia Christine Isdahl
Goalies
Therese Järnkrok
Referee:
(Denmark) Maria Raabye Fuchsel
Linesmen:
(Italy) Jessica Brambilla
(Finland) Jenna Puhakka

0–1	Bouveng (A. Wilhelmsson) – 01:06
0–2	W. Carlsson – 12:46
0–3	Lundin (W. Carlsson) – 15:47
0–4	Strömgren – 42:47
0–5	Ljungblom (J. Carlsson) – 43:16

4.5 min
Penalties
1.5 min
11
Shots
29

Semifinal

19 February 2016; 14:00	Sweden	5–0 (4–0, 0–0, 1–0)	Slovakia	Kristins Hall, Lillehammer; Attendance: 732

Anna Amholt
Goalies
Simona Lezovicova
Andrea Risianova
Referee:
(Russia) Daria Abrosimova
Linesmen:
(Netherlands) Loraine Mollen
(Switzerland) Leticia Tscherrig

Lundin (Ljungblom) (PP) – 02:06	1–0
Bouveng (A. Wilhelmsson) – 04:01	2–0
Nyhlén Persson (Westerlund, Brolin) – 04:13	3–0
Ljungblom (Lundin, Sjölund) – 08:43	4–0
Bouveng (Nyhlén Persson, Sjölund) – 38:23	5–0

35.5 min
Penalties
10.5 min
15
Shots
13

Gold medal game

21 February 2016; 11:00	Sweden	3–1 (1–1, 2–0, 0–0)	Czech Republic	Kristins Hall, Lillehammer; Attendance: 552

Anna Amholt
Goalies
Karolina Juricova
Kristyna Blahova
Referee:
(United States) Samantha Hiller
Linesmen:
(Finland) Jenna Puhakka
(Switzerland) Leticia Tscherrig

Lundin (Ljungblom) – 07:45	1–0
	1–1	Lerchova (Jandusikova) – 14:56
Lundin (Nyhlén Persson) – 20:26	2–1
A. Wilhelmsson – 26:23	3–1

4.5 min
Penalties
1.5 min
33
Shots
10

== Luge ==
Boys

Athlete	Event	Run 1		Run 2		Total	
Athlete	Event	Time	Rank	Time	Rank	Time	Rank
Svante Kohala	Singles	48.999	15	48.677	11	1:37.676	12

Girls

Athlete	Event	Run 1		Run 2		Total	
Athlete	Event	Time	Rank	Time	Rank	Time	Rank
Tove Kohala	Singles	54.945	16	57.326	20	1:52.271	19

== Skeleton ==
Athlete	Event	Run 1		Run 2		Total	
Athlete	Event	Time	Rank	Time	Rank	Time	Rank
Julia Falk	Girls'	56.30	5	56.85	13	1:53.15	6
Joanna Lahovary Olsson	Girls'	57.95	18	56.29	5	1:54.24	13

== Snowboarding ==
Snowboard and ski cross relay

Athlete	Event	Quarterfinal	Semifinal	Final
Athlete	Event	Position	Position	Position
Daryna Kyrychenko (UKR); Veronica Edebo (SWE); Valentin Miladinov (BUL); David Mobaerg (SWE)	Team snowboard ski cross	1 Q	2 FA	3rd place, bronze medalist(s)

Qualification legend: FA – Qualify to medal round; FB – Qualify to consolation round

== Speed skating ==
Girls

Athlete	Event	Final	
Athlete	Event	Time	Rank
Erika Lindgren	500 m	86.29	22
Erika Lindgren	1500 m	2:14.75	22
Erika Lindgren	Mass start	5:56.13	10

Mixed

Athletes	Event	Final	
Athletes	Event	Time	Rank
Team 5 Erika Lindgren (SWE); Isabelle van Elst (NED); Yevgeny Bolgov (BLR); Samuli Suomalainen (FIN)	Team sprint	2:16.73	11

== See also ==
- Sweden at the 2016 Summer Olympics
