= 2018 IIHF U18 Women's World Championship =

Tournament details
- Host country: Russia
- Venue: Ice Palace Dmitrov (in 1 host city)
- Dates: 6–13 January 2018
- Teams: 8

Final positions
- Champions: United States (7th title)
- Runners-up: Sweden
- Third place: Canada
- Fourth place: Russia

Tournament statistics
- Games played: 21
- Goals scored: 108 (5.14 per game)
- Attendance: 22,653 (1,079 per game)
- Scoring leader: (Switzerland) Lisa Rüedi (11 points)

Awards
- MVP: (United States) Taylor Heise

Official website
- u18worldwomen2018.iihf.hockey

The 2018 IIHF U18 Women's World Championship was the 11th IIHF U18 Women's World Championship in ice hockey. It was played at the Ice Palace in Dmitrov, Russia from 6 to 13 January 2018. The USA won for the seventh time, for the first time defeating someone other than Canada in the gold medal game. Sweden took silver, while Canada took bronze beating host Russia. The Russians beat Canada in the preliminary round, marking another first.

On 4 January 2018, the Ice Hockey Federation of Russia announced that all entry tickets would be free as part of their program.

== Top Division ==
=== Preliminary round ===
All times are local (UTC+3).

==== Group A ====
Pos	Team	Pld	W	OTW	OTL	L	GF	GA	GD	Pts	Qualification
1	United States	3	2	1	0	0	13	6	+7	8	Advance to semifinals
2	Sweden	3	1	0	1	1	3	6	−3	4	Advance to semifinals
3	Russia	3	1	0	0	2	6	9	−3	3 (Note: Canada 2–3 Russia)	Advance to quarterfinals
4	Canada	3	1	0	0	2	8	9	−1	3	Advance to quarterfinals

Source: IIHF.com
Rules for classification: 1) points; 2) head-to-head points; 3) head-to-head goal difference; 4) head-to-head number of goals scored; 5) result against closest best-ranked team outside tied teams; 6) result against second-best ranked team outside tied teams; 7) seeding before tournament.
Notes:

6 January 2018; 15:30	Canada	2–3 (0–1, 0–1, 2–1)	Russia	A Arena; Attendance: 2,281

Game reference

Madelyn McArthur
Goalies
Diana Farkhutdinova
Referees:
(Germany) Tijana Haack
(United States) Chelsea Rapin
Linesmen:
(Austria) Julia Kainberger
(Germany) Svenja Strohmenger

	0–1	06:33 – Alexandrova (Mezentseva, Golovkina)
	0–2	32:46 – Beloglazova (Provorova) (PP)
Fillier (Vorster) (PP) – 44:53	1–2
	1–3	50:35 – Bratisheva (Lobur, Orlova) (PP)
MacEachern (Connors, Correia) – 52:24	2–3

14 min
Penalties
10 min
36
Shots
14

6 January 2018; 19:30	United States	2–1 OT (1–0, 0–0, 0–1) (OT: 1–0)	Sweden	A Arena; Attendance: 475

Game reference

Lindsay Reed
Goalies
Anna Amholt
Referees:
(Canada) Lacey Senuk
(Russia) Yana Zueva
Linesmen:
(Canada) Elizabeth Mantha
(Finland) Jenna Puhakka

Murphy (Webster, O'Brien) – 19:46	1–0
	1–1	46:36 – Ljungblom (Bouveng, Antonsson) (PP)
Webster (Wethington) – 62:47	2–1

4 min
Penalties
8 min
59
Shots
13

7 January 2018; 15:30	Russia	3–5 (0–4, 1–1, 2–0)	United States	A Arena; Attendance: 2,557

Game reference

Diana Farkhutdinova
Milena Tretyak
Goalies
Calla Frank
Referees:
(Slovakia) Nikoleta Celárová
(Finland) Kaisa Ketonen
Linesmen:
(Austria) Julia Kainberger
(Czech Republic) Michaela Štefková

	0–1	03:34 – Heise (Curl) (PP)
	0–2	04:58 – Curl (Petrie) (PP)
	0–3	13:45 – Nicholson (Bilka, Hartmetz) (PP)
	0–4	15:59 – Bilka (Browne, Ostertag) (PP2)
Markova (Provorova, Bratisheva) (PP) – 28:50	1–4
	1–5	37:20 – Curl (Petrie)
Pestova (Luchnikova, Provorova) (PP) – 45:31	2–5
Medvedeva (Savonina) (PP2) – 56:08	3–5

16 min
Penalties
30 min
16
Shots
38

7 January 2018; 19:30	Canada	4–0 (2–0, 0–0, 2–0)	Sweden	A Arena; Attendance: 1,205

Game reference

Kendra Woodland
Goalies
Miranda Dahlgren
Referees:
(Germany) Tijana Haack
(United States) Chelsea Rapin
Linesmen:
(Switzerland) Anne Ruth Kuonen
(Finland) Jenna Puhakka

Kollman (Guay) – 01:24	1–0
Gosling – 11:54	2–0
Gosling (Dalton) – 54:30	3–0
Moloughney (ENG) – 55:22	4–0

10 min
Penalties
14 min
38
Shots
9

9 January 2018; 15:30	United States	6–2 (1–1, 4–0, 1–1)	Canada	A Arena; Attendance: 1,013

Game reference

Lindsay Reed
Goalies
Madelyn McArthur
Kendra Woodland
Referees:
(Finland) Kaisa Ketonen
(Russia) Yana Zueva
Linesmen:
(Sweden) Anna Hammar
(Czech Republic) Michaela Štefková

Petrie (Heise, Bizal) (EA) – 07:56	1–0
	1–1	11:44 – Connors (Adzija, Fillier)
O'Brien (Webster, Murphy) – 21:22	2–1
Simpson (Webster, Petrie) – 26:19	3–1
Heise (Farden) – 27:29	4–1
Heise (Petrie) – 38:01	5–1
Murphy (Webster) – 53:28	6–1
	6–2	58:47 – Veillette (Guay, Boyd) (PP)

6 min
Penalties
14 min
33
Shots
26

9 January 2018; 19:30	Sweden	2–0 (2–0, 0–0, 0–0)	Russia	A Arena; Attendance: 2,518

Game reference
Anna Amholt	Goalies	Diana Farkhutdinova	Referees: (United Kingdom) Deanna Cuglietta (United States) Chelsea Rapin; Linesmen: (Canada) Elizabeth Mantha (Germany) Svenja Strohmenger
Ljungblom (Bouveng) – 01:16 / 1–0; Wilhelmsson (Brolin, Antonsson) – 19:08 / 2–0			Referees: (United Kingdom) Deanna Cuglietta (United States) Chelsea Rapin; Linesmen: (Canada) Elizabeth Mantha (Germany) Svenja Strohmenger
18 min	Penalties	8 min	Referees: (United Kingdom) Deanna Cuglietta (United States) Chelsea Rapin; Linesmen: (Canada) Elizabeth Mantha (Germany) Svenja Strohmenger
18	Shots	26	Referees: (United Kingdom) Deanna Cuglietta (United States) Chelsea Rapin; Linesmen: (Canada) Elizabeth Mantha (Germany) Svenja Strohmenger

==== Group B ====
Pos	Team	Pld	W	OTW	OTL	L	GF	GA	GD	Pts	Qualification
1	Czech Republic	3	2	0	1	0	8	7	+1	7	Advance to quarterfinals
2	Finland	3	2	0	0	1	9	6	+3	6	Advance to quarterfinals
3	Germany	3	1	1	0	1	5	6	−1	5	Advance to relegation round
4	Switzerland	3	0	0	0	3	6	9	−3	0	Advance to relegation round

Source: IIHF.com
Rules for classification: 1) points; 2) head-to-head points; 3) head-to-head goal difference; 4) head-to-head number of goals scored; 5) result against closest best-ranked team outside tied teams; 6) result against second-best ranked team outside tied teams; 7) seeding before tournament.

6 January 2018; 15:30	Czech Republic	4–3 (0–1, 3–1, 1–1)	Switzerland	B Arena; Attendance: 118

Game reference

Kristýna Bláhová
Goalies
Saskia Maurer
Referees:
(United Kingdom) Deanna Cuglietta
(Finland) Maija Kontturi
Linesmen:
(Sweden) Anna Hammar
(Russia) Diana Mokhova

	0–1	16:40 – Vallario (Ryhner) (PP)
	0–2	24:14 – Wetli (Enzler, Rüedi) (PP)
Lorencová (Exnerová) – 28:31	1–2
Kaltounková – 28:54	2–2
Lerchová (Kaltounková, Erbenová) – 36:22	3–2
	3–3	42:47 – Rüedi (Enzler, Wetli) (PP)
Kaltounková – 44:54	4–3

12 min
Penalties
8 min
31
Shots
36

6 January 2018; 19:30	Finland	4–1 (2–0, 2–1, 0–0)	Germany	B Arena; Attendance: 102

Game reference

Sanni Ahola
Goalies
Johanna May
Referees:
(Slovakia) Nikoleta Celarova
(Denmark) Maria Raabye Fuchsel
Linesmen:
(Switzerland) Anne Ruth Kuonen
(Czech Republic) Michaela Stefkova

Holopainen (Seikkula, Liikala) – 03:56	1–0
Rantala (Holopainen, Liikala) – 14:05	2–0
Liikala (Holopainen, Laitinen) – 21:07	3–0
Räsänen (Kastikainen) – 34:48	4–0
	4–1	39:12 – Li. Welcke (Christof)

6 min
Penalties
6 min
32
Shots
17

7 January 2018; 15:30	Czech Republic	1–2 OT (0–1, 1–0, 0–0) (OT: 0–1)	Germany	B Arena; Attendance: 116

Game reference

Kristýna Bláhová
Goalies
Johanna May
Referees:
(Japan) Miyuki Nakayama
(Russia) Yana Zueva
Linesmen:
(Canada) Elizabeth Mantha
(Russia) Diana Mokhova

	0–1	01:43 – Haider (Schwamborn, Botthof) (PP)
Exnerová (Lerchová) – 32:45	1–1
	1–2	62:44 – Lu. Welcke (Klinger, Botthof) (PP)

8 min
Penalties
8 min
38
Shots
16

7 January 2018; 19:30	Switzerland	2–3 (1–1, 1–0, 0–2)	Finland	B Arena; Attendance: 112

Game reference

Saskia Maurer
Goalies
Sanni Ahola
Referees:
(United Kingdom) Deanna Cuglietta
(Canada) Lacey Senuk
Linesmen:
(Sweden) Anna Hammar
(Germany) Svenja Strohmenger

	0–1	01:20 – Holopainen (Vainikka)
Leeman (Ryhner, Rüedi) – 17:02	1–1
Leeman (Ryhner, Zimmermann) (PP) – 37:46	2–1
	2–2	41:14 – Liikala (Holopainen, Laitinen)
	2–3	50:22 – Vainikka (Laitinen, Holopainen)

10 min
Penalties
12 min
25
Shots
32

9 January 2018; 15:30	Germany	2–1 (1–1, 1–0, 0–0)	Switzerland	B Arena; Attendance: 92

Game reference

Johanna May
Goalies
Saskia Maurer
Referees:
(Finland) Maija Kontturi
(Japan) Miyuki Nakayama
Linesmen:
(Russia) Diana Mokhova
(Finland) Jenna Puhakka

Bar (Li. Welcke) (PP) – 04:55	1–0
	1–1	07:06 – Enzler (Leemann)
Li. Welcke (Lu. Welcke, Nickisch) – 21:18	2–1

6 min
Penalties
8 min
30
Shots
25

9 January, 2018; 19:30	Finland	2–3 (1–1, 1–1, 0–1)	Czech Republic	B Arena; Attendance: 105

Game reference

Sanni Ahola
Goalies
Kristýna Bláhová
Referees:
(Denmark) Maria Raabye Fuchsel
(Canada) Lacey Senuk
Linesmen:
(Austria) Julia Kainberger
(United States) Jodi Price

	0–1	13:47 – Machalová (Lerchová, Kaltounková)
Melotindos (Liikala) – 14:31	1–1
	1–2	26:13 – Jandušíková (Škrdlová, Lerchová)
Laitinen (Vainikka) (PP) – 32:46	2–2
	2–3	40:28 – Kaltounková (Machalová, Erbenová) (PP)

6 min
Penalties
10 min
23
Shots
29

=== Relegation round ===
The third and fourth placed team from Group B played a best-of-three series to determine the relegated team.

10 January 2018; 15:30	Germany	3–7 (0–3, 0–3, 3–1)	Switzerland	B Arena; Attendance: 84

Game reference

Johanna May
Tatjana Pfeifer
Goalies
Saskia Maurer
Referees:
(Slovakia) Nikoleta Celárová
(Finland) Kaisa Ketonen
Linesmen:
(Finland) Jenna Puhakka
(Czech Republic) Michaela Štefková

	0–1	03:34 – Sydney Berta (Lutz)
	0–2	13:25 – Rüedi (Enzler) (PP)
	0–3	14:08 – Ryhner (Zimmermann)
	0–4	31:50 – Rüedi (SH)
	0–5	38:36 – Enzler (Rüedi, Leemann)
	0–6	39:13 – Rüedi (Enzler, Wetli) (PP)
Brendel (Nickisch, Bar) (PP) – 45:30	1–6
Brendel (Lu. Welcke) – 46:19	2–6
Lu. Welcke (Hark, Li. Welcke) – 52:00	3–6
	3–7	54:15 – Wetli (Enzler, Rüedi) (PP)

10 min
Penalties
14 min
28
Shots
30

12 January 2018; 15:30	Switzerland	3–0 (1–0, 2–0, 0–0)	Germany	B Arena; Attendance: 74

Game reference

Saskia Maurer
Goalies
Johanna May
Referees:
(Finland) Maija Kontturi
(Russia) Yana Zueva
Linesmen:
(Canada) Elizabeth Mantha
(Czech Republic) Michaela Štefková

Rüedi (Christen, Wetli) – 09:49	1–0
Enzler (Rüedi) (PP) – 22:43	2–0
Rüedi (Christen, Enzler) – 34:05	3–0

6 min
Penalties
10 min
30
Shots
18

=== Final round ===
==== Bracket ====
Quarterfinals
A4	Canada	3
B1	Czech Republic	1
A3	Russia	2
B2	Finland	0

Semifinals
A1	United States (GWS)	4
A4	Canada	3
A2	Sweden	2
A3	Russia	1

Final
A1	United States	9
A2	Sweden	3
Third place
A3	Russia	1
A4	Canada	5

==== Quarterfinals ====
10 January 2018; 15:30	Canada	3–1 (0–0, 3–0, 0–1)	Czech Republic	A Arena; Attendance: 715

Game reference

Madelyn McArthur
Goalies
Kristýna Bláhová
Referees:
(Denmark) Maria Raabye Füchsel
(United States) Chelsea Rapin
Linesmen:
(Russia) Diana Mokhova
(United States) Jodi Price

Correia (Adzija) – 26:02	1–0
Slobodzian (Fillier, Vorster) (PP) – 28:55	2–0
Kollman (Shirley) – 35:39	3–0
	3–1	40:16 – Škrdlová (Lerchová, Kaltounková) (PP2)

12 min
Penalties
10 min
40
Shots
16

10 January 2018; 19:30	Russia	2–0 (0–0, 2–0, 0–0)	Finland	A Arena; Attendance: 2,418

Game reference
Diana Farkhutdinova	Goalies	Sanni Ahola	Referees: (Germany) Tijana Haack (Canada) Lacey Senuk; Linesmen: (Switzerland) Anne Ruth Kuonen (Canada) Elizabeth Mantha
Alexandrova (Bratisheva, Beloglazova) – 27:23 / 1–0; Beloglazova (Bratisheva, Alexandrova) (PP) – 29:18 / 2–0			Referees: (Germany) Tijana Haack (Canada) Lacey Senuk; Linesmen: (Switzerland) Anne Ruth Kuonen (Canada) Elizabeth Mantha
18 min	Penalties	4 min	Referees: (Germany) Tijana Haack (Canada) Lacey Senuk; Linesmen: (Switzerland) Anne Ruth Kuonen (Canada) Elizabeth Mantha
22	Shots	24	Referees: (Germany) Tijana Haack (Canada) Lacey Senuk; Linesmen: (Switzerland) Anne Ruth Kuonen (Canada) Elizabeth Mantha

==== Semifinals ====
12 January 2018; 15:30	United States	4–3 GWS (1–1, 0–2, 2–0) (OT: 0–0) (SO: 2–1)	Canada	A Arena; Attendance: 1,295

Game reference

Lindsay Reed
Goalies
Madelyn McArthur
Referees:
(Germany) Tijana Haack
(Denmark) Maria Raabye Füchsel
Linesmen:
(Switzerland) Anne Ruth Kuonen
(Sweden) Anna Hammar

Heise (Curl, Ostertag) – 8:33	1–0
	1–1	15:13 – Boyd (Guay)
	1–2	33:29 – Adzija (Fillier, Guay) (PP)
	1–3	36:51 – Rickwood (Adzija, Fillier)
O'Brien (Webster) (PP) – 46:22	2–3
Browne (Nicholson) – 49:36	3–3

Heise (miss)
Curl
Murphy (miss)
Webster
Shootout
Connors
(miss) Fillier
(miss) Dalton
(miss) Adzija
(miss) Veillette
6 min
Penalties
20 min
35
Shots
25

12 January 2018; 19:30	Sweden	2–1 (0–0, 1–0, 1–1)	Russia	A Arena; Attendance: 2,718

Game reference

Anna Amholt
Goalies
Diana Farkhutdinova
Referees:
(United Kingdom) Deana Cuglietta
(United States) Chelsea Rapin
Linesmen:
(Austria) Julia Kainberger
(United States) Jodi Price

Bouveng (Ljungblom, Waxin) (PP) – 30:23	1–0
	1–1	48:54 – Markova (PP)
Ljungblom (Nylén Persson) (PP) – 50:25	2–1

20 min
Penalties
12 min
21
Shots
24

==== Fifth place game ====
12 January 2018; 19:30	Czech Republic	1–2 (0–0, 0–1, 1–1)	Finland	B Arena; Attendance: 99

Game reference

Kristýna Bláhová
Goalies
Sanni Ahola
Referees:
(Slovakia) Nikoleta Celárová
(Japan) Miyuki Nakayama
Linesmen:
(Russia) Diana Mokhova
(Germany) Svenja Strohmenger

	0–1	38:12 – Vainikka
Machalová (Lerchová, Kaltounková) – 42:29	1–1
	1–2	53:24 – Liikala (Holopainen)

6 min
Penalties
10 min
34
Shots
18

==== Bronze medal game ====
13 January 2018; 15:30	Russia	1–5 (0–1, 0–2, 1–2)	Canada	A Arena; Attendance: 2,503

Game reference

Diana Farkhutdinova
Goalies
Madelyn McArthur
Referees:
(Slovakia) Nikoleta Celárová
(United States) Chelsea Rapin
Linesmen:
(Sweden) Anna Hammar
(United States) Jodi Price

	0–1	19:47 – Gosling (Guay) (PP)
	0–2	26:14 – Veillette (Guay)
	0–3	34:03 – Moloughney (SH)
	0–4	40:19 – Vorster (Connors) (PP)
	0–5	48:37 – Guay (PP)
Ponyatovskaya (Bratisheva, Alexandrova) – 49:01	1–5

14 min
Penalties
10 min
15
Shots
38

==== Gold medal game ====
13 January 2018; 19:30	United States	9–3 (3–1, 6–0, 0–2)	Sweden	A Arena; Attendance: 2,053

Game reference

Lindsay Reed
Goalies
Anna Amholt, Miranda Dahlgren
Referees:
(United Kingdom) Deana Cuglietta
(Canada) Lacey Senuk
Linesmen:
(Austria) Julia Kainberger
(Canada) Elizabeth Mantha

	0–1	01:35 – Johansson (Lidman, Aho)
Knoll (O'Brien) – 6:14	1–1
O'Brien (Murphy) – 10:04	2–1
Curl (Petrie, Heise) (PP) – 19:26	3–1
Petrie (Heise, Curl) – 20:33	4–1
Murphy (Webster) – 21:27	5–1
Curl (Bizal, Shearen) (PP) – 23:36	6–1
Petrie (Heise, Curl) – 24:15	7–1
Murphy (Webster, Simpson) – 25:38	8–1
Knoll (Hartmetz, Bilka) (PP) – 35:31	9–1
	9–2	41:28 – Antonsson (Nylén Persson, Bouveng) (PP)
	9–3	48:48 – Ljungblom (Bouveng) (PP)

4 min
Penalties
8 min
36
Shots
9

=== Final ranking ===
Pos	Grp	Team	Pld	W	OTW	OTL	L	GF	GA	GD	Pts	Final result
1	A	United States	5	4	1	0	0	26	12	+14	14	Champions
2	A	Sweden	5	2	0	1	2	8	16	−8	7	Runners-up
3	A	Canada	6	3	0	1	2	19	15	+4	10	Third place
4	A	Russia (H)	6	2	0	0	4	10	16	−6	6	Fourth place
5	B	Finland	5	3	0	0	2	11	9	+2	9	Fifth place game
6	B	Czech Republic	5	2	0	1	2	10	12	−2	7	Fifth place game
7	B	Switzerland	5	2	0	0	3	16	12	+4	6	Advance in Relegation
8	B	Germany	5	1	1	0	3	8	16	−8	5	Relegation to Division I A

Source: IIHF
(H) Host

=== Tournament awards ===
==== Most Valuable Player ====
(United States) Taylor Heise

==== All-star team ====
- Goaltender: (Sweden) Anna Amholt
- Defencemen: (Sweden) Maja Nylén Persson, (Canada) Alexie Guay
- Forwards: (United States) Taylor Heise, (Russia) Ilona Markova, (United States) Makenna Webster

==== Best players selected by the directorate ====
- Best Goalkeeper (Sweden) Anna Amholt
- Best Defenseman (United States) Gracie Ostertag
- Best Forward (United States) Taylor Heise

=== Statistics ===
==== Scoring leaders ====
Pos	Player	Country	GP	G	A	Pts	+/−	PIM
1	Lisa Rüedi	Switzerland	5	6	5	11	0	0
2	Rahel Enzler	Switzerland	5	3	6	9	+2	0
3	Makenna Webster	United States	5	2	7	9	+8	0
4	Britta Curl	United States	5	4	4	8	+6	2
4	Taylor Heise	United States	5	4	4	8	+7	12
6	Dominique Petrie	United States	5	3	5	8	+7	8
7	Kristýna Kaltounková	Czech Republic	5	3	4	7	+6	10
8	Elisa Holopainen	Finland	5	1	6	7	+7	0
9	Alexie Guay	Canada	6	1	6	7	+2	10
10	Abigail Murphy	United States	5	4	2	6	+6	2

GP = Games played; G = Goals; A = Assists; Pts = Points; +/− = P Plus–minus; PIM = Penalties In Minutes
Source: IIHF.com

==== Goaltending leaders ====
(minimum 40% team's total ice time)

Pos	Player	Country	TOI	GA	GAA	Sv%	SO
1	Sanni Ahola	Finland	299:07	9	1.81	92.91	0
2	Diana Farkhutdinova	Russia	343:23	12	2.10	92.45	1
3	Anna Amholt	Sweden	208:25	11	3.17	91.85	1
4	Saskia Maurer	Switzerland	297:52	12	2.42	91.37	1
5	Kristýna Bláhová	Czech Republic	301:36	12	2.39	90.98	0

TOI = Time On Ice (minutes:seconds); GA = Goals against; GAA = Goals against average; Sv% = Save percentage; SO = Shutouts
Source: IIHF.com

== Division I ==
=== Group A ===
The Group A tournament was held in Asiago, Italy from 8 to 14 January 2018.

Pos	Team	Pld	W	OTW	OTL	L	GF	GA	GD	Pts	Promotion or relegation
1	Japan	5	5	0	0	0	21	1	+20	15	Promoted to the 2019 Top Division
2	Slovakia	5	3	1	0	1	18	11	+7	11	
3	Italy (H)	5	2	0	1	2	13	14	−1	7	
4	Austria	5	2	0	0	3	10	17	−7	6	
5	Hungary	5	1	0	1	3	8	18	−10	4	
6	Norway	5	0	1	0	4	4	13	−9	2	Relegated to the 2019 Division I B

Source: IIHF
Rules for classification: 1) points; 2) head-to-head points; 3) head-to-head goal difference; 4) head-to-head number of goals scored; 5) result against closest best-ranked team outside tied teams; 6) result against second-best ranked team outside tied teams; 7) seeding before tournament.
(H) Host

=== Group B ===
The Group B tournament was held in Katowice, Poland from 6 to 12 January 2018.

Pos	Team	Pld	W	OTW	OTL	L	GF	GA	GD	Pts	Promotion or relegation
1	Denmark	5	5	0	0	0	30	3	+27	15	Promoted to the 2019 Division I A
2	France	5	4	0	0	1	16	6	+10	12	
3	Poland (H)	5	3	0	0	2	17	9	+8	9	
4	China	5	1	1	0	3	9	22	−13	5	
5	Great Britain	5	1	0	0	4	7	15	−8	3	
6	Australia	5	0	0	1	4	6	30	−24	1	Relegated to the 2019 Division I B Qualification

Source: IIHF
Rules for classification: 1) points; 2) head-to-head points; 3) head-to-head goal difference; 4) head-to-head number of goals scored; 5) result against closest best-ranked team outside tied teams; 6) result against second-best ranked team outside tied teams; 7) seeding before tournament.
(H) Host

=== Group B Qualification ===
The Group B Qualification tournament was held in Mexico City, Mexico from 30 January to 4 February 2018.

Pos	Team	Pld	W	OTW	OTL	L	GF	GA	GD	Pts	Promotion
1	Netherlands	4	4	0	0	0	25	5	+20	12	Promoted to the 2019 Division I B
2	Mexico (H)	4	3	0	0	1	11	9	+2	9	
3	Spain	4	2	0	0	2	16	9	+7	6	
4	Kazakhstan	4	1	0	0	3	20	13	+7	3	
5	Turkey	4	0	0	0	4	3	39	−36	0	

Source: IIHF
Rules for classification: 1) points; 2) head-to-head points; 3) head-to-head goal difference; 4) head-to-head number of goals scored; 5) result against closest best-ranked team outside tied teams; 6) result against second-best ranked team outside tied teams; 7) seeding before tournament.
(H) Host
