= Ice hockey at the 2016 Winter Youth Olympics – Girls' tournament =

2016 Winter Youth Olympics – Girls' tournament
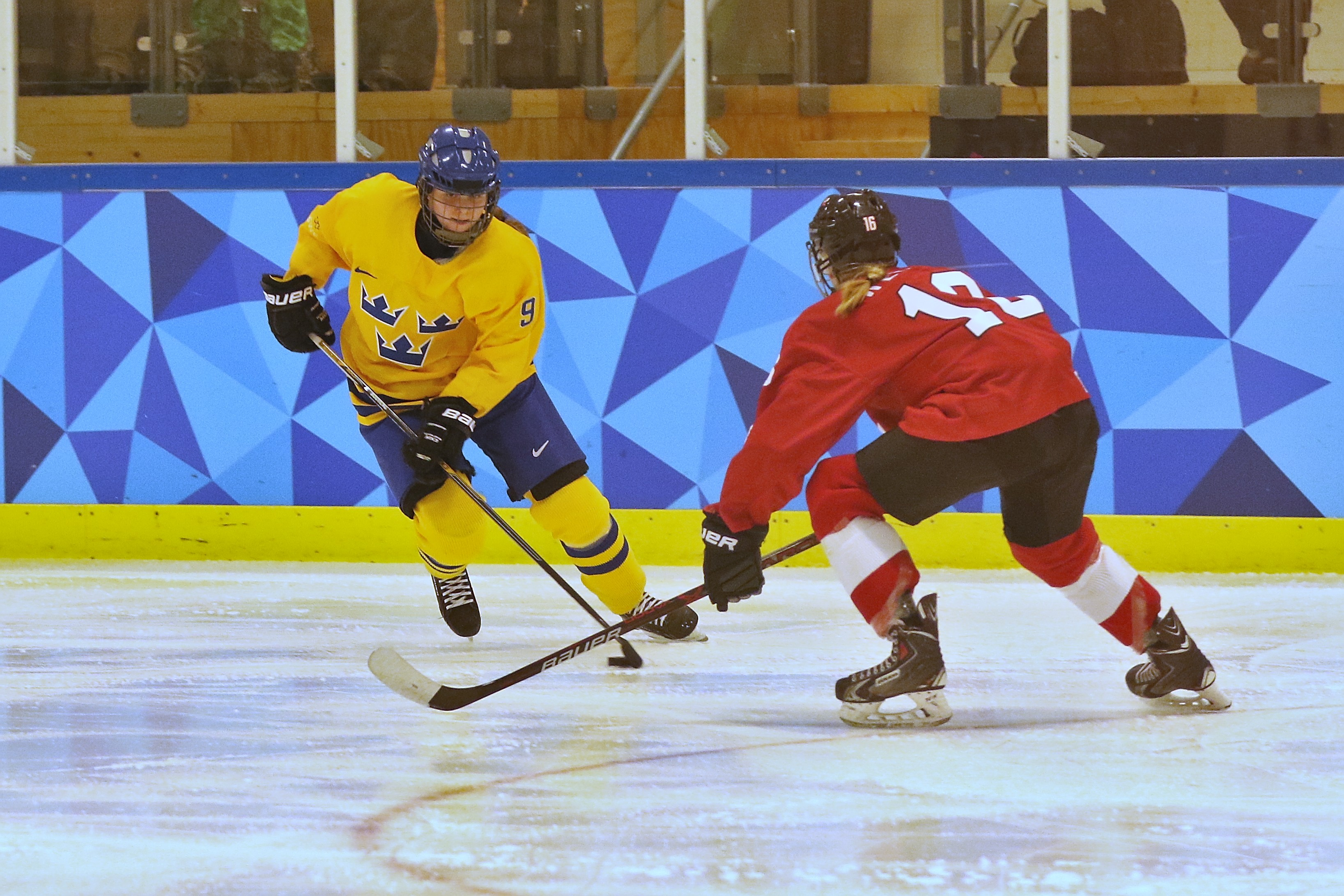

Tournament details
- Host country: Norway
- Venues: 2 (in 1 host city)
- Dates: 12–21 February
- Teams: 5

Final positions
- Champions: Sweden (2nd title)
- Runners-up: Czech Republic
- Third place: Switzerland
- Fourth place: Slovakia

Tournament statistics
- Games played: 14
- Goals scored: 54 (3.86 per game)
- Attendance: 5,906 (422 per game)
- Scoring leader: (Switzerland) Rahel Enzler (10 points)

The girls' ice hockey tournament at the 2016 Winter Youth Olympics was held from 12 to 21 February at the Kristins Hall and the Youth Hall in Lillehammer, Norway.

== Preliminary round ==
All times are local (UTC+1).

Pos	Team	Pld	W	SOW	SOL	L	GF	GA	GD	Pts	Qualification
1	Sweden	4	2	1	1	0	10	3	+7	9 (Note: Czech Republic 0–2 Sweden)	Advance to semifinals
2	Czech Republic	4	3	0	0	1	7	4	+3	9	Advance to semifinals
3	Switzerland	4	2	1	0	1	10	6	+4	8	Advance to semifinals
4	Slovakia	4	1	0	1	2	6	9	−3	4	Advance to semifinals
5	Norway (H)	4	0	0	0	4	2	13	−11	0	

Source: IIHF
(H) Host
Notes:

12 February 2016; 14:00	Slovakia	2–1 (0–1, 1–0, 1–0)	Norway	Kristins Hall; Attendance: 425

Game reference

Simona Ležovičová
Goalies
Ena Marie Nystrøm
Referee:
(Canada) Vanessa Ley
Linesmen:
(Netherlands) Senovwa Mollen
(Germany) Jacqueline Sauer

	0–1	12:45 – Sirum (Endrerud, Jørgensen)
Ágoštonová – 15:51	1–1
Maťašová (Čorňáková, Koyšová) – 38:04	2–1

1.5 min
Penalties
29.5 min
19
Shots
8

13 February 2016; 17:00	Czech Republic	2–1 (1–1, 1–0, 0–0)	Slovakia	Youth Hall; Attendance: 185

Game reference
3 min	Penalties	4.5 min
34	Shots	14

13 February 2016; 20:00	Sweden	1–2 GWS (1–0, 0–0, 0–1) (SO: 0–1)	Switzerland	Youth Hall; Attendance: 184

Game reference
Anna Amholt	Goalies	Saskia Maurer	Referee: (United States) Samantha Hiller; Linesmen: (Netherlands) Loraine Mollen (Finland) Jenna Puhakka
Lundin (J. Carlsson) – 11:21 / 1–0; / 1–1 / 38:07 – Rüedi (Enzler) (PP)			Referee: (United States) Samantha Hiller; Linesmen: (Netherlands) Loraine Mollen (Finland) Jenna Puhakka
Lundin (miss); Nylén Persson; Bouveng (miss); Nylén Persson (miss); Ljungblom (miss); Lundin (miss)	Shootout	(miss) Enzler; (miss) Rüedi; Berta; (miss) Enzler; (miss) Hauser; Ryhner	Referee: (United States) Samantha Hiller; Linesmen: (Netherlands) Loraine Mollen (Finland) Jenna Puhakka
3 min	Penalties	4.5 min	Referee: (United States) Samantha Hiller; Linesmen: (Netherlands) Loraine Mollen (Finland) Jenna Puhakka
18	Shots	18	Referee: (United States) Samantha Hiller; Linesmen: (Netherlands) Loraine Mollen (Finland) Jenna Puhakka

14 February 2016; 17:00	Norway	0–3 (0–0, 0–3, 0–0)	Czech Republic	Kristins Hall; Attendance: 798

Game reference
13.5 min	Penalties	3 min
8	Shots	28

15 February 2016; 17:00	Sweden	2–1 GWS (1–0, 0–1, 0–0) (SO: 1–0)	Slovakia	Youth Hall; Attendance: 160

Game reference
Anna Amholt	Goalies	Simona Ležovičová	Referee: (Russia) Daria Abrosimova; Linesmen: (Norway) Marion Dahl Strand (Switzerland) Leticia Tscherrig
Ljungblom (Lundin) – 07:38 / 1–0; / 1–1 / 28:26 – Čorňáková (Ágoštonová)			Referee: (Russia) Daria Abrosimova; Linesmen: (Norway) Marion Dahl Strand (Switzerland) Leticia Tscherrig
Nylén Persson (miss); Lundin (miss); W. Carlsson	Shootout	(miss) Hajniková; (miss) Cagáňová; (miss) Vargová	Referee: (Russia) Daria Abrosimova; Linesmen: (Norway) Marion Dahl Strand (Switzerland) Leticia Tscherrig
9 min	Penalties	4.5 min	Referee: (Russia) Daria Abrosimova; Linesmen: (Norway) Marion Dahl Strand (Switzerland) Leticia Tscherrig
26	Shots	14	Referee: (Russia) Daria Abrosimova; Linesmen: (Norway) Marion Dahl Strand (Switzerland) Leticia Tscherrig

15 February 2016; 20:00	Switzerland	3–1 (1–0, 0–0, 2–1)	Norway	Youth Hall; Attendance: 350

Game reference
4.5 min	Penalties	7.5 min
28	Shots	14

16 February 2016; 14:00	Czech Republic	0–2 (0–0, 0–1, 0–1)	Sweden	Youth Hall; Attendance: 77

Game reference
Karolína Juřicová	Goalies	Anna Amholt	Referee: (Canada) Vanessa Ley; Linesmen: (Germany) Jacqueline Sauer (Switzerland) Leticia Tscherrig
0–1 / Ljungblom (Bouveng) – 24:02; 0–2 / Bouveng (ENG) – 44:24			Referee: (Canada) Vanessa Ley; Linesmen: (Germany) Jacqueline Sauer (Switzerland) Leticia Tscherrig
6 min	Penalties	4.5 min	Referee: (Canada) Vanessa Ley; Linesmen: (Germany) Jacqueline Sauer (Switzerland) Leticia Tscherrig
12	Shots	20	Referee: (Canada) Vanessa Ley; Linesmen: (Germany) Jacqueline Sauer (Switzerland) Leticia Tscherrig

16 February 2016; 17:00	Slovakia	2–4 (0–0, 1–3, 1–1)	Switzerland	Youth Hall; Attendance: 85

Game reference
6 min	Penalties	9 min
14	Shots	19

18 February 2016; 14:00	Norway	0–5 (0–2, 0–1, 0–2)	Sweden	Kristins Hall; Attendance: 1,252

Game reference

Mia Christine Isdahl
Goalies
Therese Järnkrok
Referee:
(Denmark) Maria Raabye Fuchsel
Linesmen:
(Italy) Jessica Brambilla
(Finland) Jenna Puhakka

0–1	01:06 – Bouveng (A. Wilhelmsson)
0–2	12:46 – W. Carlsson
0–3	15:47 – Lundin (W. Carlsson)
0–4	42:47 – Strömgren
0–5	43:16 – Ljungblom (J. Carlsson, Nylén Persson)

4.5 min
Penalties
1.5 min
11
Shots
29

18 February 2016; 14:00	Switzerland	1–2 (1–1, 0–0, 0–1)	Czech Republic	Youth Hall; Attendance: 284

Game reference

Ramona Forrer
Goalies
Kristýna Blachová
Referee:
(United States) Samantha Hiller
Linesmen:
(Germany) Jacqueline Sauer
(Norway) Marion Dahl Strand

	0–1	12:01 – Mlýnková (SH)
Enzler (Ryhner) – 14:18	1–1
	1–2	33:37 – Machalová (PP)

6 min
Penalties
4.5 min
11
Shots
21

== Playoff round ==
=== Bracket ===
Semifinals
19 February
Sweden	5
Slovakia	0
19 February
Czech Republic (GWS)	2
Switzerland	1

Final
21 February
Sweden	3
Czech Republic	1
Third place
20 February
Switzerland	5
Slovakia	2

=== Semifinals ===
19 February 2016; 14:00	Sweden	5–0 (4–0, 0–0, 1–0)	Slovakia	Kristins Hall; Attendance: 732

Game reference

Anna Amholt
Goalies
Simona Ležovičová
Andrea Rišianová
Referee:
(Russia) Daria Abrosimova
Linesmen:
(Netherlands) Senovwa Mollen
(Switzerland) Léticia Tscherrig

Lundin (Ljungblom) (PP) – 02:06	1–0
Bouveng (A. Wilhelmsson) – 04:01	2–0
Nylén Persson (Westerlund, Brolin) – 04:13	3–0
Ljungblom (Lundin, Sjölund) – 08:43	4–0
Bouveng (Nylén Persson) – 38:23	5–0

35.5 min
Penalties
10.5 min
15
Shots
13

19 February 2016; 14:00	Czech Republic	2–1 GWS (1–0, 0–1, 0–0) (SO: 1–0)	Switzerland	Youth Hall; Attendance: 350

Game reference
Kristýna Blachová	Goalies	Saskia Maurer	Referee: (Canada) Vanessa Ley; Linesmen: (Italy) Jessica Brambila (Germany) Jacqueline Sauer
Hornická (Machalová, Kotounová) – 04:26 / 1–0; / 1–1 / 28:45 – Enzler (Zimmermann, Rüedi) (PP)			Referee: (Canada) Vanessa Ley; Linesmen: (Italy) Jessica Brambila (Germany) Jacqueline Sauer
Erbenová; Mlýnková	Shootout	(miss) Berta; (miss) Ryhner	Referee: (Canada) Vanessa Ley; Linesmen: (Italy) Jessica Brambila (Germany) Jacqueline Sauer
7.5 min	Penalties	19 min	Referee: (Canada) Vanessa Ley; Linesmen: (Italy) Jessica Brambila (Germany) Jacqueline Sauer
29	Shots	10	Referee: (Canada) Vanessa Ley; Linesmen: (Italy) Jessica Brambila (Germany) Jacqueline Sauer

=== Bronze medal game ===
20 February 2016; 17:00	Switzerland	5–2 (0–1, 3–0, 2–1)	Slovakia	Kristins Hall; Attendance: 472

Game reference

Saskia Maurer
Goalies
Simona Ležovičová
Referee:
(Denmark) Maria Raabye Füchsel
Linesmen:
(Netherlands) Senovwa Mollen
(Germany) Jacqueline Sauer

	0–1	04:55 – Horváthová
Ryhner (Enzler, Rüedi) – 20:49	1–1
Berta (Wetli) – 27:57	2–1
Ryhner (Rüedi, Enzler) (PP) – 29:28	3–1
Ryhner (Enzler, Wetli) (PP) – 34:13	4–1
Schlegel – 40:56	5–1
	5–2	44:13 – Sedláková (Ágoštonová)

3 min
Penalties
4.5 min
20
Shots
11

=== Gold medal game ===
21 February 2016; 11:00	Sweden	3–1 (1–1, 2–0, 0–0)	Czech Republic	Kristins Hall; Attendance: 552

Game reference

Anna Amholt
Goalies
Karolína Juřicová
Kristýna Blachová
Referee:
(United States) Samantha Hiller
Linesmen:
(Finland) Jenna Puhakka
(Switzerland) Léticia Tscherrig

Lundin (Ljungblom) – 07:45	1–0
	1–1	14:56 – Lerchová (Jandušíková)
Lundin (Nylén Persson) – 20:26	2–1
A. Wilhelmsson – 26:23	3–1

4.5 min
Penalties
1.5 min
33
Shots
10
