= Alexie Guay =

Canadian ice hockey player

- Born: January 8, 2001 (age 25) Magog, Québec, Canada
- Position: Defence
- Shoots: Left
- PWHL team Former teams: Ottawa Charge; New York Sirens; Modo Hockey; Clarkson Golden Knights; Boston College Eagles
- National team: Canada
- Playing career: 2019–present

Alexie Guay (born January 8, 2001) is a Canadian ice hockey defenceman, currently signed to the Ottawa Charge of the Professional Women's Hockey League (PWHL) as a reserve player.

== Playing career ==
Guay played on boys' teams until the end of peewee AAA, notably serving as team captain of the Harfangs du Triolet.

She began her high school with the women's ice hockey team of Stanstead College, playing under head coach Sarah Vaillancourt. As a senior, she transferred to the North American Hockey Academy (NAHA) and played with NAHA White in the Junior Women's Hockey League (JWHL). She finished the 2018–19 JWHL season averaging a point-per-game.

In 2019, she begin attending Boston College and joined the college's women's ice hockey program. She scored 19 points in 36 games in her rookie NCAA year, third among all rookie NCAA defenders, and was named to the Hockey East All-Rookie Team. After four seasons with the Eagles, Guay transferred to Clarkson for her fifth and final year of eligibility.

Following her college career, Guay declared for, but went undrafted in, the 2024 PWHL draft. She then signed with Modo Hockey of the SDHL for the 2024-25 season. After the SDHL season finished, Guay was signed by the New York Sirens as a reserve player.

=== Style of play ===
Guay has been noted for her skating and offensive skills, as well as her vision and ability to log significant ice time.

== International career ==
Guay represented Canada at the 2018 and 2019 IIHF World Women's U18 Championship, scoring a total of 13 points in 11 games, as the country won bronze and gold respectively. She led both Team Canada and all defenders in scoring at both tournaments, winning the Best Defender Award at the 2019 tournament.

== Personal life ==
Her father, François Guay, played thirteen seasons of professional ice hockey and appeared in one NHL game, for the Buffalo Sabres in 1990. As of September 2022, Guay's two brothers play in the ECHL. Her older brother, Nicolas, is a right winger with the Trois-Rivières Lions and her younger brother, Patrick, is a centre with the Savannah Ghost Pirates. Patrick was selected in the fifth round, 145th overall in the 2022 NHL entry draft by the Vegas Golden Knights and his NHL rights are retained by the Golden Knights, though he remains unsigned with the team.
