= Makenna Webster =

American ice hockey player (born 2002)

- Born: March 21, 2002 (age 24) St. Louis, Missouri, U.S.
- Height: 5 ft 3 in (160 cm)
- Position: Forward
- Shoots: Right
- PWHL team: New York Sirens
- National team: United States
- Playing career: 2020–present
Medal record
World U18 Championships
Gold medal – first place	2018 Russia
Gold medal – first place	2020 Slovakia
Silver medal – second place	2019 Japan

Makenna Webster (born March 21, 2002) is an American dual sport athlete, competing as an ice hockey forward for the New York Sirens and a field hockey forward for Team USA. She previously played ice and field hockey for Ohio State, and ice hockey for Wisconsin, where she was named Most Outstanding Player at the 2021 NCAA tournament. In the 2025 PWHL Draft, Webster was selected in the third round, seventeenth overall, by the New York Sirens.

== College career ==
=== Ice hockey ===
Webster began her collegiate career for the University of Wisconsin during the 2020–21 season. During her freshman year, she recorded eight goals and five assists in 21 games. She helped Wisconsin win their sixth National Championship. She was subsequently named tournament Most Outstanding Player. During the 2021–22 season, in her sophomore year, she recorded a career-high 23 goals and 30 assists in 38 games.

On May 26, 2022, Webster transferred to Ohio State. During the 2022–23 season, in her junior year, she recorded 15 goals and 24 assists in 31 games. During the 2023–24 season, in her senior year, she recorded 12 goals and 14 assists in 31 games. She helped Ohio State win their second national championship in program history, and was named to the All-Tournament team. During the 2024–25 season, as a graduate student, she recorded 12 goals and 23 assists in 30 games.

=== Field hockey ===
Because the University of Wisconsin does not have a field hockey team, Webster did not play collegiately until 2022, after transferring to Ohio State. She played all 19 games of her first season, and was the team's third-leading scorer, with six goals and three assists. In 2023, Webster totaled 47 points and had top 10 national rankings in points, goals scored (17), and assists (12). During the 2024 season, she led the team with 42 points. She became the 11th player to record 100 career points, doing so in just three seasons. She was subsequently named the Ohio State Athlete of the Year. Webster returned to the team in 2025, where she broke the Ohio State program record for most goals in a game, after scoring 6 goals against Kent State.

== Professional career ==
Webster was selected in the third round, seventeenth overall, by the New York Sirens in the 2025 PWHL Draft. She was included on the Sirens' 2025 training camp roster. Prior to the camp, Webster confirmed that she would not be playing with the team for the 2025–26 season, instead focusing on field hockey in the hopes of representing the U.S. for the 2028 Olympics. Sirens GM Pascal Daoust expressed support for her decision and clarified that Webster is planning to join the team in the future.

On July 23, 2026, Webster signed a three-year contract with the Sirens.

== International play ==
=== Ice hockey ===
Webster represented the United States at the 2018 IIHF World Women's U18 Championship where she led the team in scoring with two goals and seven assists in five games and won a gold medal. She represented the United States at the 2019 IIHF World Women's U18 Championship, where she recorded three goals and three assists in five games and won a silver medal. She again represented the United States at the 2020 IIHF World Women's U18 Championship, where she recorded two assists in five games and won a gold medal. Webster also represented the United States in the 2022 and 2023 Collegiate Series tournaments.

=== Field hockey ===
Webster was a member of the U-17 Women’s Field Hockey National Team from 2018 to 2019. In 2025, Webster was named to the U.S. Women's National Team.

== Personal life ==
Webster was born to Dave Webster and Sunny Hilliard, and has an older brother, McKade Webster. McKade played college ice hockey at Denver. The two siblings have a combined four national championships. Webster's sports role model is Kendall Coyne, and her favorite post game meal is pasta and chicken.

== Career statistics ==
=== Regular season and playoffs ===
			Regular season					Playoffs
Season	Team	League	GP	G	A	Pts	PIM	GP	G	A	Pts	PIM
2020–21	University of Wisconsin	WCHA	21	8	5	13	4	—	—	—	—	—
2021–22	University of Wisconsin	WCHA	38	23	30	53	16	—	—	—	—	—
2022–23	Ohio State University	WCHA	31	15	24	39	2	—	—	—	—	—
2023–24	Ohio State University	WCHA	31	12	14	26	6	—	—	—	—	—
2024–25	Ohio State University	WCHA	30	12	23	35	12	—	—	—	—	—
NCAA totals			151	70	96	166	40	—	—	—	—	—

=== International ===
Year	Team	Event	Result	GP	G	A	Pts	PIM
2018	United States	U18	1st place, gold medalist(s)	5	2	7	9	0
2019	United States	U18	2nd place, silver medalist(s)	5	3	3	6	0
2020	United States	U18	1st place, gold medalist(s)	5	0	2	2	0
Junior totals				15	5	12	17	0

== Awards and honors ==
Honors	Year	Ref
College
NCAA Frozen Four Most Outstanding Player	2021	
NCAA All Tournament Team	2021	
All-WCHA third team	2022	
All-WCHA academic team	2022	
All-WCHA academic team	2024	
All-WCHA academic team	2025	
WCHA Scholar Athlete award	2024	
WCHA Scholar Athlete award	2025	
