= Zoe Boyd =

Canadian ice hockey player (born 2000)

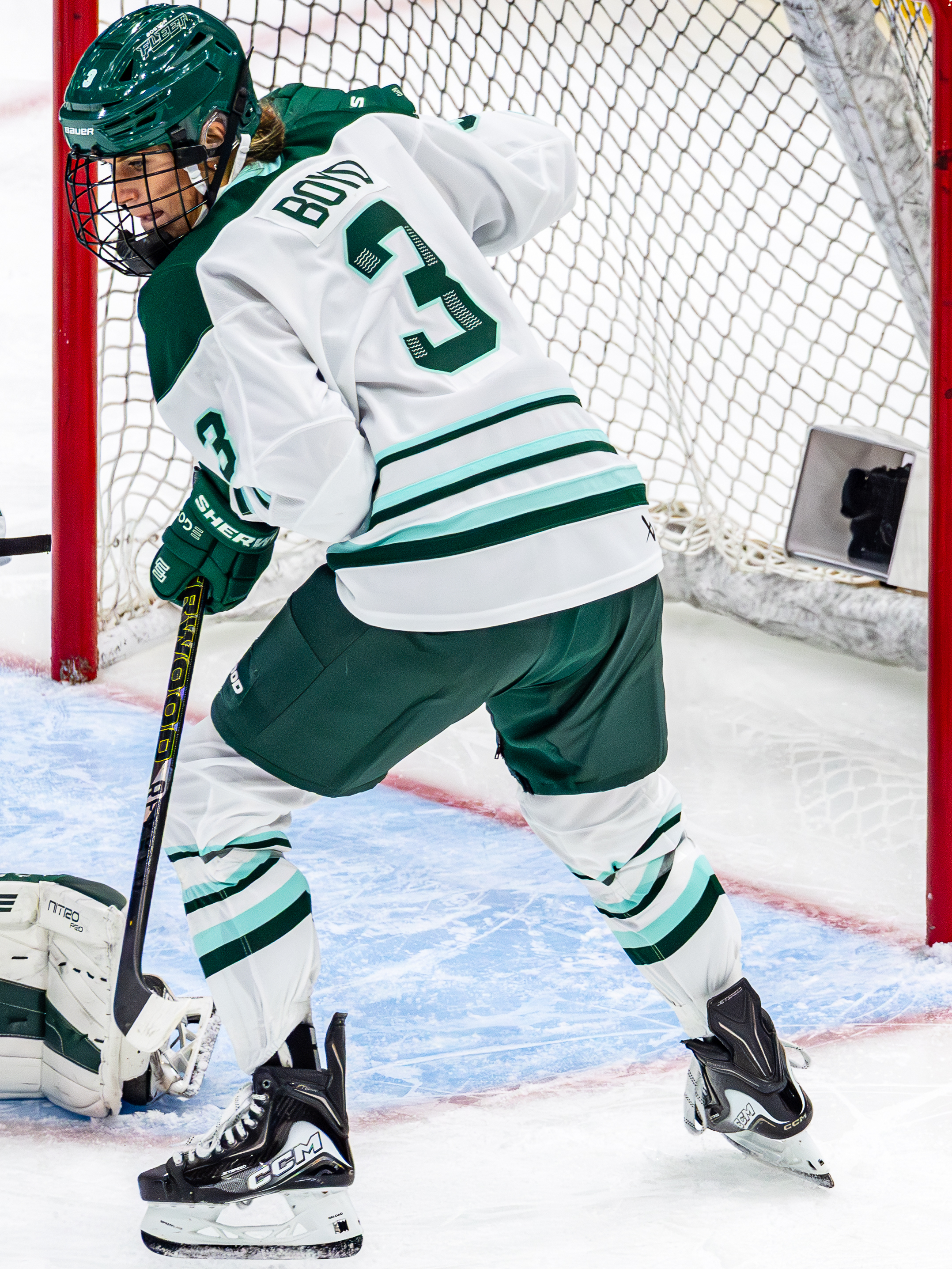
- Boyd with the Boston Fleet in 2026
- Born: August 9, 2000 (age 26) Caledon East, Ontario, Canada
- Height: 5 ft 8 in (173 cm)
- Position: Defender
- Shoots: Left
- PWHL team Former teams: Hamilton Havoc; Ottawa Charge; Boston Fleet
- Playing career: 2018–present

Zoe Boyd (born August 9, 2000) is a Canadian professional ice hockey player who is a defender for the Hamilton Havoc in the Professional Women's Hockey League (PWHL). She previously played for the Boston Fleet and the Ottawa Charge of the PWHL. She played college ice hockey at Quinnipiac.

== Early life ==
Boyd and her childhood best friend, Kristin Della Rovere, grew up together in Caledon, Ontario. They played junior hockey together for the Caledon Hawks, Brampton Canadettes and North Halton Twisters. Boyd and Della Rovere served as captain and assistant captains of the Caledon Hawks' boys hockey team.

== Playing career ==
=== College ===
Boyd began her collegiate career for Quinnipiac during the 2018–19 season. During her freshman year, she recorded two goals and ten assists in 36 games. She ranked second on the team in defensive scoring with 12 points. During the 2019–20 season in her sophomore year, she recorded a three goals and nine assists in 37 games. She missed the 2020–21 season due to injury.

During the 2021–22 season in her senior year, she recorded one goal and 12 assists in 35 games. Following the season she was named to the Al-ECAC Third Team. On September 15, 2022, Boyd was named co-captain for the 2022–23 season. As a graduate student, she recorded three goals and 11 assists in 27 games.

=== Professional ===
On May 22, 2023, Boyd signed a one-year contract with the Boston Pride of the Premier Hockey Federation (PHF). The PHF ceased operations on June 29, 2023, as a result she never played a game for the Pride.

On September 18, 2023, Boyd was drafted in the ninth round, 53rd overall, by PWHL Ottawa in the 2023 PWHL Draft. On October 31, 2023, she signed a two-year contract with Ottawa. During the 2023–24 season, she recorded three assists in 16 games. On March 20, 2024, she suffered a fractured left wrist in a game against PWHL New York, ending her season. On June 10, 2024, she signed a one-year contract extension with Ottawa. During the 2024–25 season, she recorded three assists in 23 games.

On June 20, 2025, she signed a one-year contract with the Boston Fleet. During the 2025–26 season, she recorded one assist in 12 games, before suffering a season-ending injury in February 2026.

During the league's expansion to 12 teams ahead of the 2026–27 season, Boyd was left unprotected by the Fleet and signed a two-year contract with the Hamilton Havoc on June 11, 2026.

== International play ==
Medal record

Representing Canada

Ice hockey

World U18 Championships
| Bronze medal – third place | 2018 Russia | |

Boyd represented Canada at the 2018 IIHF World Women's U18 Championship where she served as alternate captain and recorded one goal and one assist in six games and won a bronze medal.

== Personal life ==
Boyd's mother, Tammy Thomson, was involved in a catastrophic car accident when Boyd was five years old, suffering a traumatic brain injury and full paralysis in the right side of her body. She was in a coma for four months, and lost her memory. On December 31, 2024, Thomson attended one of her daughter's games for the first time.

Boyd runs a podcast called “No Straight Answers with Zoe Boyd” where she interviews queer professionals about primarily LGBTQ+ content.

== Career statistics ==
=== Regular season and playoffs ===
| | | | Regular season | | | | | Playoffs |
| Season | Team | League | GP | G | A | Pts | PIM | GP | G | A | Pts | PIM |
|---|---|---|---|---|---|---|---|---|---|---|---|---|
| 2018–19 | Quinnipiac University | ECAC | 36 | 2 | 10 | 12 | 10 | — | — | — | — | — |
| 2019–20 | Quinnipiac University | ECAC | 37 | 3 | 9 | 12 | 8 | — | — | — | — | — |
| 2021–22 | Quinnipiac University | ECAC | 35 | 1 | 12 | 13 | 6 | — | — | — | — | — |
| 2022–23 | Quinnipiac University | ECAC | 27 | 3 | 11 | 14 | 4 | — | — | — | — | — |
| 2023–24 | PWHL Ottawa | PWHL | 16 | 0 | 3 | 3 | 2 | — | — | — | — | — |
| 2024–25 | Ottawa Charge | PWHL | 23 | 0 | 3 | 3 | 25 | 8 | 0 | 0 | 0 | 4 |
| 2025–26 | Boston Fleet | PWHL | 12 | 0 | 1 | 1 | 4 | — | — | — | — | — |
| PWHL totals | | | 51 | 0 | 7 | 7 | 31 | 8 | 0 | 0 | 0 | 4 |

=== International ===
| Year | Team | Event | Result | GP | G | A | Pts | PIM |
|---|---|---|---|---|---|---|---|---|
| 2018 | Canada | U18 | 3rd place, bronze medalist(s) | 6 | 1 | 1 | 2 | 4 |
| Junior totals | | | | 6 | 1 | 1 | 2 | 4 |
