= Natálie Mlýnková =

Czech ice hockey player (born 2001)

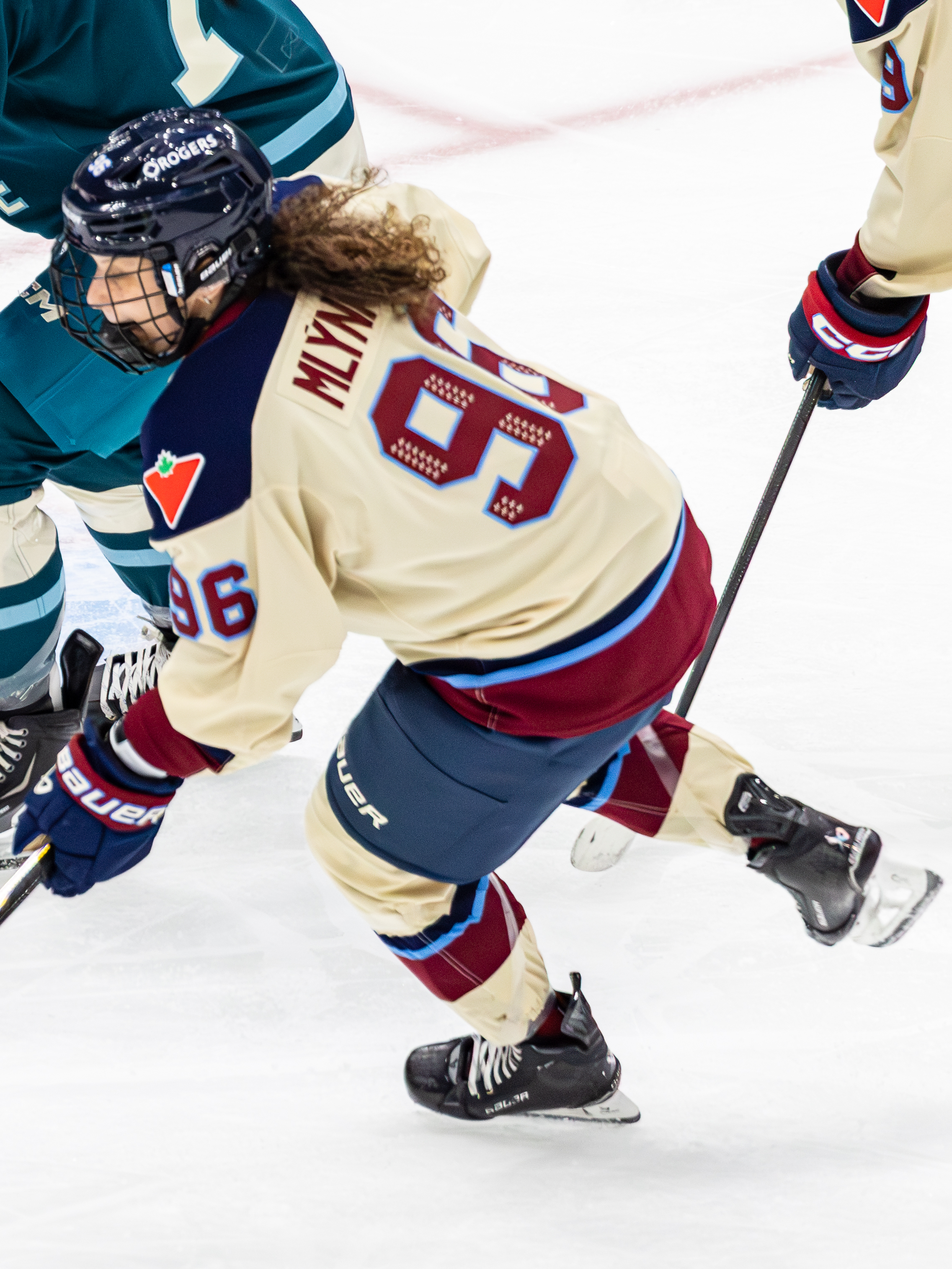
- Mlýnková with the Montreal Victoire in 2025
- Born: 24 May 2001 (age 25) Zlín, Czech Republic
- Height: 1.61 m (5 ft 3 in)
- Weight: 63 kg (139 lb; 9 st 13 lb)
- Position: Forward
- Shoots: Left
- PWHL team Former teams: San Jose Sea Lions; HTI Stars; HC Slavia Praha; Montreal Victoire
- National team: Czech Republic
- Playing career: 2019–present
Medal record
World Championship
Bronze medal – third place	2022 Denmark
Bronze medal – third place	2023 Canada

Natálie Mlýnková (born 24 May 2001) is a Czech professional ice hockey player for the San Jose Sea Lions of the Professional Women's Hockey League (PWHL), and a member of the Czech Republic women's national ice hockey team. She previously played for the Montreal Victoire of the PWHL. She played college ice hockey at Vermont and Minnesota.

== Playing career ==
=== College ===
Mlýnková played college ice hockey for Vermont. During the 2023–24 season, she led Hockey East in points, and recorded 26 points on a league-best 15 goals and 11 assists in 27 conference games. Following the season she was awarded the 2024 Cammi Granato Award as Hockey East Player of the Year. She became the second Catamount player to lead Hockey East in points.

She transferred to Minnesota for her graduate year for the 2024–25 season.

=== Professional ===
On 24 June 2025, Mlýnková was drafted in the second round, 12th overall, by the Montreal Victoire in the 2025 PWHL Draft. On 20 November 2025, she signed a one-year contract with the Victoire. During the 2025–26 season, she recorded five goals and five assists in 30 regular season games and helped the Victoire win the Walter Cup in 2026.

During the league's expansion to 12 teams ahead of the 2026–27 season, she signed a one-year contract with the San Jose Sea Lions on 14 June 2026.

== International play ==
Mlýnková represented the Czech national under-18 team at the IIHF World Women's U18 Championship in 2017, 2018, and 2019, and won a silver medal with the Czech national under-16 team in the girls' ice hockey tournament at the 2016 Winter Youth Olympics.

She represented the Czech Republic at the IIHF World Women's Championship in 2019, 2021, 2022 and 2023.

At the 2026 Winter Olympics, Mlynkova led Czechia in goals scored with three. Of note, Mlynkova became the first Czech women's player to score three goals at an Olympic tournament.

== Career statistics ==
=== Regular season and playoffs ===
Note: GP = Games played; G = Goals; A = Assists; Pts = Points; PIM = Penalty minutes;

			Regular season					Playoffs
Season	Team	League	GP	G	A	Pts	PIM	GP	G	A	Pts	PIM
2020–21	Vermont Catamounts	HEA	11	1	4	5	8	—	—	—	—	—
2021–22	Vermont Catamounts	HEA	22	7	10	17	4	—	—	—	—	—
2022–23	Vermont Catamounts	HEA	36	23	19	42	8	—	—	—	—	—
2023–24	Vermont Catamounts	HEA	35	17	16	33	16	—	—	—	—	—
2024–25	Minnesota Golden Gophers	WCHA	39	16	18	34	10	—	—	—	—	—
2025–26	Montreal Victoire	PWHL	30	5	5	10	6	9	0	0	0	0
PWHL totals			30	5	5	10	6	9	0	0	0	0

=== International ===
Note: GP = Games played; G = Goals; A = Assists; Pts = Points; PIM = Penalty minutes;

				Regular season
Year	Team	Event	Result	GP	G	A	Pts	PIM
2017	Czechia	U18	6th	4	2	1	3	2
2018	Czechia	U18	6th	5	0	0	0	2
2019	Czechia	U18	7th	6	5	0	5	10
2019	Czechia	WC	6th	5	3	0	3	4
2021	Czechia	WC	7th	6	0	1	1	2
2021	Czechia	OGQ	Q	3	1	3	4	0
2022	Czechia	OG	7th	5	1	0	1	2
2022	Czechia	WC	3rd place, bronze medalist(s)	7	6	2	8	2
2023	Czechia	WC	3rd place, bronze medalist(s)	7	2	1	3	2
2024	Czechia	WC	4th	7	4	2	6	2
2025	Czechia	WC	4th	7	4	2	6	2
2026	Czechia	OG	5th	5	3	1	4	0
Junior totals				15	7	1	8	14
Senior totals				52	24	12	36	16

== Awards and honours ==
Honors	Year
College
Hockey East Player of the Year	2024
PWHL
Walter Cup champion	2026

Awards and achievements
Preceded by Alina Müller	Cammi Granato Award; 2024	Succeeded by Reichen Kirchmair
