= Nicole Vallario =

Swiss ice hockey player (born 2001)

- Born: 30 August 2001 (age 25) Lugano, Switzerland
- Height: 163 cm (5 ft 4 in)
- Position: Defense
- Shoots: Left
- PWHL team Former teams: New York Sirens; EV Zug; HC Thurgau; HC Lugano
- National team: Switzerland
- Playing career: 2015–present
Medal record
Olympic Games
Bronze medal – third place	2026 Milano Cortina	Team

Nicole Vallario (born 30 August 2001) is a Swiss professional ice hockey defenseman signed as a player for the New York Sirens of the Professional Women's Hockey League (PWHL). She is a member of the Swiss national team and played college ice hockey with the St. Thomas Tommies women's ice hockey program. She also previously played in the Swiss Women's League (SWHL A) with EV Zug, HC Thurgau Ladies and HC Ladies Lugano.

== International play ==
Vallario represented Switzerland in the women's ice hockey tournament at the 2022 Winter Olympics in Beijing and at the IIHF Women's World Championship in 2019, 2021, 2022, 2023, 2024, 2025. As a junior player with the Swiss national under-18 team, she participated in the IIHF U18 Women's World Championship in 2016, 2017, 2018, and 2019. She won a bronze medal with the Swiss under-16 team in the girls' ice hockey tournament at the 2016 Winter Youth Olympics in Lillehammer.

== Professional career ==
Vallario was not selected in the 2025 PWHL draft but received an invite to training camp with the New York Sirens. She went on to make the opening day roster with the Sirens. Vallario scored her first career goal against the Vancouver Goldeneyes on November 29, 2025 in the Sirens home opener.

== Career statistics ==
=== Regular season and playoffs ===
			Regular season					Playoffs
Season	Team	League	GP	G	A	Pts	PIM	GP	G	A	Pts	PIM
2015–16	Ladies Team Lugano	SWHL A	5	0	0	0	0	4	0	0	0	0
2016–17	Ladies Team Lugano	SWHL A	3	0	0	0	2	7	0	1	1	2
2017–18	Ladies Team Lugano	SWHL A	17	0	4	4	4	6	0	0	0	0
2018–19	Ladies Team Lugano	SWHL A	11	4	4	8	0	7	0	2	2	0
2019–20	Ladies Team Lugano	SWHL A	19	2	8	10	2	5	1	2	3	0
2020–21	HT Thurgau	SWHL A	20	6	4	10	6	5	2	1	3	2
2021–22	St. Thomas Tommies	NCAA	20	4	3	7	2	—	—	—	—	—
2022–23	St. Thomas Tommies	NCAA	31	1	3	4	6	—	—	—	—	—
2023–24	St. Thomas Tommies	NCAA	37	5	10	15	2	—	—	—	—	—
2024–25	St. Thomas Tommies	NCAA	35	4	6	10	17	—	—	—	—	—
SWHL A totals			75	12	20	32	14	34	3	6	9	4
NCAA totals			123	14	22	36	27	—	—	—	—	—

==== Club tournaments ====
Year	Team	Event	Rank	GP	G	A	Pts	PIM
2016–17	Ladies Team Lugano	Swiss Women Cup	1st place, gold medalist(s)	3	0	1	1	0
2017–18	Ladies Team Lugano	Swiss Women Cup	8th	1	0	0	0	0
2018–19	Ladies Team Lugano	Swiss Women Cup	2nd	2	0	1	1	0
2019–20	Ladies Team Lugano	Swiss Women Cup	3rd	2	0	0	0	0
				8	0	2	2	0

=== International ===
Year	Team	Event	GP	G	A	Pts	PIM
2016	Switzerland	U18	5	0	0	0	0
2016	Switzerland	YOG	6	0	0	0	0
2017	Switzerland	U18	5	0	2	2	2
2018	Switzerland	U18	5	1	0	1	0
2019	Switzerland	U18	5	0	0	0	0
2019	Switzerland	WC	5	0	0	0	0
2021	Switzerland	WC	7	0	0	0	4
2022	Switzerland	OG	7	0	1	1	2
2022	Switzerland	WC	6	1	0	1	0
2023	Switzerland	WC	7	1	1	2	2
2024	Switzerland	WC	6	0	0	0	0
2025	Switzerland	WC	6	0	1	1	0
2026	Switzerland	OG	7	0	0	0	2
Junior totals			26	1	2	3	2
Senior totals			51	2	3	5	10

== Honours and achievements ==
=== SWHL-A ===
- 2018–2019 : Champion with Ladies Team Lugano
- 2020–2021 : Best Defender

=== Swiss Women Cup ===
- 2016–2017 : Cup Winner with Ladies Team Lugano

=== YOG ===
- 2016 : Bronze Medal

=== College ===
- WCHA Defender of the Week (Week of November 11, 2024)
