= Magdalena Erbenová =

Czech ice hockey player (born 2000)

- Born: 9 February 2000 (age 26) Mladá Boleslav, Czech Republic
- Height: 1.67 m (5 ft 6 in)
- Position: Defense
- Shoots: Left
- Auroraliiga team Former teams: TPS Turku: RPI Engineers; HC Baník Příbram HC Slavia Praha
- National team: Czech Republic
- Playing career: 2013–present

Magdalena Erbenová (born 9 February 2000) is a Czech ice hockey player. She has played in the Finnish Auroraliiga with TPS Turku since 2025.

Erbenová was a member of the Czech national ice hockey team that participated in the 2021 IIHF Women's World Championship.

== Playing career ==
At age 5, Erbenová began playing in the minor ice hockey department of HC Benátky nad Jizerou in Benátky nad Jizerou, a town about 21 kilometres (13 mi) southwest of her hometown in the Central Bohemian Region of the Czech Republic.

Her senior club career began in the Czech Women's Extraliga at age 14 with the women's representative team of HC Slavia Praha. After four seasons with HC Slavia Praha, she transferred to HC Baník Příbram for the 2018–19 Czech Women's Extraliga season. Erbenová also played in the second-tier Czech national under-16 league with HC Benátky nad Jizerou U16 and in USA Hockey's 19U Tier-1 league with the Northwood School Huskies elite girls' ice hockey team.

Erbenová played five seasons (2020–2025) of college ice hockey with the RPI Engineers women's ice hockey program in the ECAC Hockey conference of the NCAA Division I.

=== International play ===
Erbenová made her senior national team debut at the 2021 IIHF Women's World Championship.

As a junior player with the Czech national under-18 team, she participated in the IIHF Women's U18 World Championships in 2016 and 2017, and served as team captain at the 2018 tournament. At the 2016 Winter Youth Olympics, she was the flagbearer for the Czech delegation at the opening ceremony and served as captain of the Czech girls' ice hockey team, which won a silver medal in the girls' ice hockey tournament.

== Personal life ==
Erbenová was born on 9 February 2000 to Zdeněk Erben and Romana Erbenová in Mladá Boleslav – a Czech town situated about 50 kilometres (31 mi) northeast of Prague. She attended the Secondary School for the Administration of the EU (Czech: Střední odborná škola pro administrativu v EU) in Prague for four years before relocating to Lake Placid, New York, United States to attend the Northwood School, a private boarding school, for her last year of secondary school.

In 2020, she began studying business and management at the Rensselaer Polytechnic Institute in Troy, New York and earned selection to the 2020–21 ECAC Hockey All-Academic team.
