= Stefanie Wetli =

Swiss ice hockey player (born 2000)

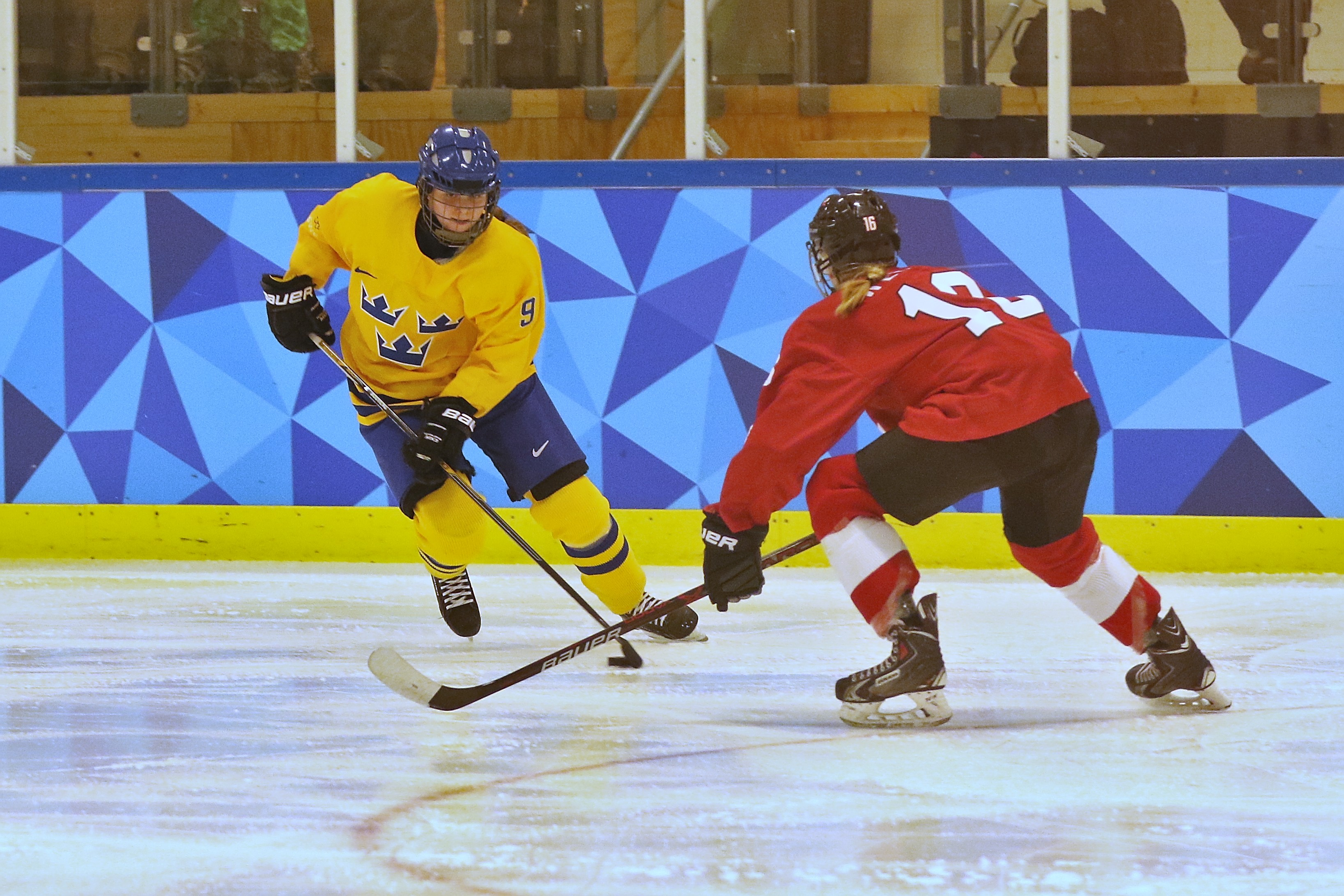
- Wetli at the 2016 Winter Youth Olympics
- Born: 4 February 2000 (age 26) Männedorf, Zürich, Switzerland
- Height: 1.73 m (5 ft 8 in)
- Weight: 63 kg (139 lb; 9 st 13 lb)
- Position: Defense
- Shoots: Left
- PFWL team Former teams: SC Bern: HC Davos; HC Thurgau; SC Weinfelden
- National team: Switzerland
- Playing career: 2017–present
Medal record
Olympic Games
Bronze medal – third place	2026 Milano Cortina	Team

Stefanie Wetli (born 4 February 2000) is a Swiss ice hockey player and member of the Swiss national ice hockey team. She has played with the women's team of SC Bern in the Women's League (SWHL A or PFWL) since 2025.

== International play ==
At the 2016 Winter Youth Olympics in Lillehammer, Wetli won a bronze medal in the girls' ice hockey tournament with the Swiss under-16 team.

As a junior player with the Swiss national under-18 team, she participated in the IIHF U18 Women's World Championship in 2015, 2016, 2017, and 2018, serving as team captain for the 2018 tournament.

Wetli represented Switzerland in the women's ice hockey tournament at the 2018 Winter Olympics in PyeongChang, the women's ice hockey tournament at the 2022 Winter Olympics in Beijing, and won an Olympic bronze medal in the women's ice hockey tournament at the 2026 Winter Olympics in Milan and Cortina d'Ampezzo. With the senior national team, she has also participated in the IIHF Women's World Championships in 2019, 2021, 2022, 2023, 2024, and 2025.

== Career statistics ==
=== Regular season and playoffs ===
			Regular season					Playoffs
Season	Team	League	GP	G	A	Pts	PIM	GP	G	A	Pts	PIM
2016-17	EHC Wallisellen	SWHL A	3	2	4	6	2	5	0	1	1	2
2017-18	EHC Wallisellen	SWHL A	6	0	1	1	2	3	1	0	1	4
2018-19	SC Weinfelden	SWHL A	6	1	1	2	0	2	0	1	1	0
2019-20	SC Weinfelden	SWHL A	14	2	2	4	4	3	0	0	0	0
2020-21	HT Thurgau	SWHL A	12	2	3	5	8	5	1	1	2	0
2021-22	HT Thurgau	SWHL A	21	2	4	6	12	2	0	0	0	0
2022-23	HC Thurgau	SWHL A	24	7	9	16	13	4	2	0	2	2
2023-24	HC Davos	SWHL A	25	1	4	5	6	6	1	4	5	6
2024-25	HC Davos	SWHL A	28	2	7	9	8	6	1	1	2	0
PFWL/SWHL A totals			139	19	35	54	55	36	6	8	14	14

==== Club tournaments ====
Season	Team	Tournament	GP	G	A	Pts	PIM
2017-18	SC Weinfelden	Swiss Women Cup	3	4	1	5	2
2018-19	SC Weinfelden	Swiss Women Cup	2	0	1	1	0
2019-20	SC Weinfelden	Swiss Women Cup	1	1	0	1	0
2021-22	HT Thurgau	National Cup	2	2	0	2	2
2022-23	HC Thurgau	National Cup	2	0	0	0	0
2024-25	HC Davos	National Cup	3	2	1	3	2

=== International ===
Year	Team	Event	GP	G	A	Pts	PIM
2015	Switzerland U18	WC18	5	0	1	1	0
2016	Switzerland U18	WC18	5	0	0	0	2
2016	Switzerland U16	YOG	6	0	4	4	6
2017	Switzerland U18	WC18	5	0	0	0	0
2018	Switzerland U18	WC18	5	2	3	5	4
2018	Switzerland	OG	6	0	0	0	0
2019	Switzerland	WC	5	0	0	0	0
2021	Switzerland	WC	7	0	0	0	2
2022	Switzerland	OG	7	0	0	0	0
2022	Switzerland	WC	6	0	0	0	4
2023	Switzerland	WC	7	0	0	0	2
2024	Switzerland	WC	6	0	1	1	0
2025	Switzerland	WC	6	0	0	0	2
2026	Switzerland	OG	7	0	0	0	2
Junior totals			20	2	4	6	6
Senior totals			57	0	1	1	12

== Honours and achievements ==
=== YOG ===
- 2016 : Bronze Medal

=== WC U18 ===
- 2018 : Most Goals by Defensement (2)
- 2018 : Top 3 Player on Team
