= Rahel Enzler =

Swiss ice hockey player (born 2000)

- Born: 30 July 2000 (age 26) Walchwil, Switzerland
- Height: 163 cm (5 ft 4 in)
- Weight: 63 kg (139 lb; 9 st 13 lb)
- Position: Forward
- Shoots: Left
- PFWL team Former teams: EV Zug: Maine Black Bears; SC Reinach; ZSC Lions
- National team: Switzerland
- Playing career: 2016–present
Medal record
Olympic Games
Bronze medal – third place	2026 Milano Cortina	Team

Rahel Enzler (born 30 July 2000) is a Swiss ice hockey player and member of the Swiss national team. She is signed in the Swiss Women's League (PFWL) with the EVZ Women's Team of EV Zug through the 2025–26 season.

== Playing career ==
Enzler developed in the youth system of EHC Seewen, a minor and junior ice hockey club in Seewen, Schwyz, less than 20 km (12 mi) northwest of her hometown of Walchwil, Zug. She played five games with the ZSC Lions Frauen, the women's representative team of the ZSC Lions, during the 2015–16 SWHL A season in addition to playing with the Seewen under-15 and under-17 teams in the Mini A and Top Novizen respectively.

Enzler joined SC Reinach Damen, the women's representative team of SC Reinach, in 2017. She served as Reinach's captain during the 2019–20 season of the Women's League (SWHL A; renamed from Swiss Women's Hockey League A in 2019).

Her college ice hockey career was played with the Maine Black Bears women's ice hockey program in the Hockey East (HEA) conference of the NCAA Division I. She first joined the program as an incoming freshman in the 2020–21 season.

=== International ===
Enzler represented Switzerland in the women's ice hockey tournament at the 2022 Winter Olympics in Beijing and at the IIHF Women's World Championship in 2017, 2019 and 2021. At the 2022 Winter Olympics, she skated in all seven games as the Swiss qualified for the bronze medal game before ultimately falling to Finland and placing fourth.

As a junior player with the Swiss national under-18 team, she participated in the IIHF U18 Women's World Championship in 2015, 2016, 2017 and 2018. She won a bronze medal while serving as alternate captain to the Swiss under-16 team in the girls' ice hockey tournament at the 2016 Winter Youth Olympics in Lillehammer.

In the quarterfinal round of the 2026 Winter Olympics, Enzler earned one of the assists on Alina Muller's goal. Switzerland defeated Finland in a 1-0 final, returning to the semifinals for the third time in four Olympics.

== Personal life ==
Her brother, Simon Enzler, is a football player who has represented Switzerland with the under-18, under-19, and under-20 national teams.

== Career statistics ==
			Regular season					Playoffs
Season	Team	League	GP	G	A	Pts	PIM	GP	G	A	Pts	PIM
2015-16	ZSC Lions	SWHL A	5	3	5	8	2	-	-	-	-	-
2017-18	SC Reinach	SWHL A	18	17	13	30	6	4	2	2	4	2
2018-19	SC Reinach	SWHL A	20	23	24	47	6	5	2	6	8	4
2019-20	SC Reinach	SWHL A	17	8	21	29	6	5	2	3	5	2
2020-21	Maine Black Bears	HEA	17	3	6	9	0	–	–	–	–	–
2021-22	Maine Black Bears	HEA	22	0	3	3	4	–	–	–	–	–
2022-23	Maine Black Bears	HEA	29	2	9	11	4	–	–	–	–	–
2023-24	Maine Black Bears	HEA	35	6	20	26	0	–	–	–	–	–
2024-25	EV Zug	PFWL	28	16	36	52	0	6	2	5	7	2
SWHL A/PFWL totals			88	67	99	166	20	20	8	16	24	10
NCAA totals			103	11	38	49	8	–	–	–	–	–
