= Saskia Maurer =

Swiss ice hockey player (born 2001)

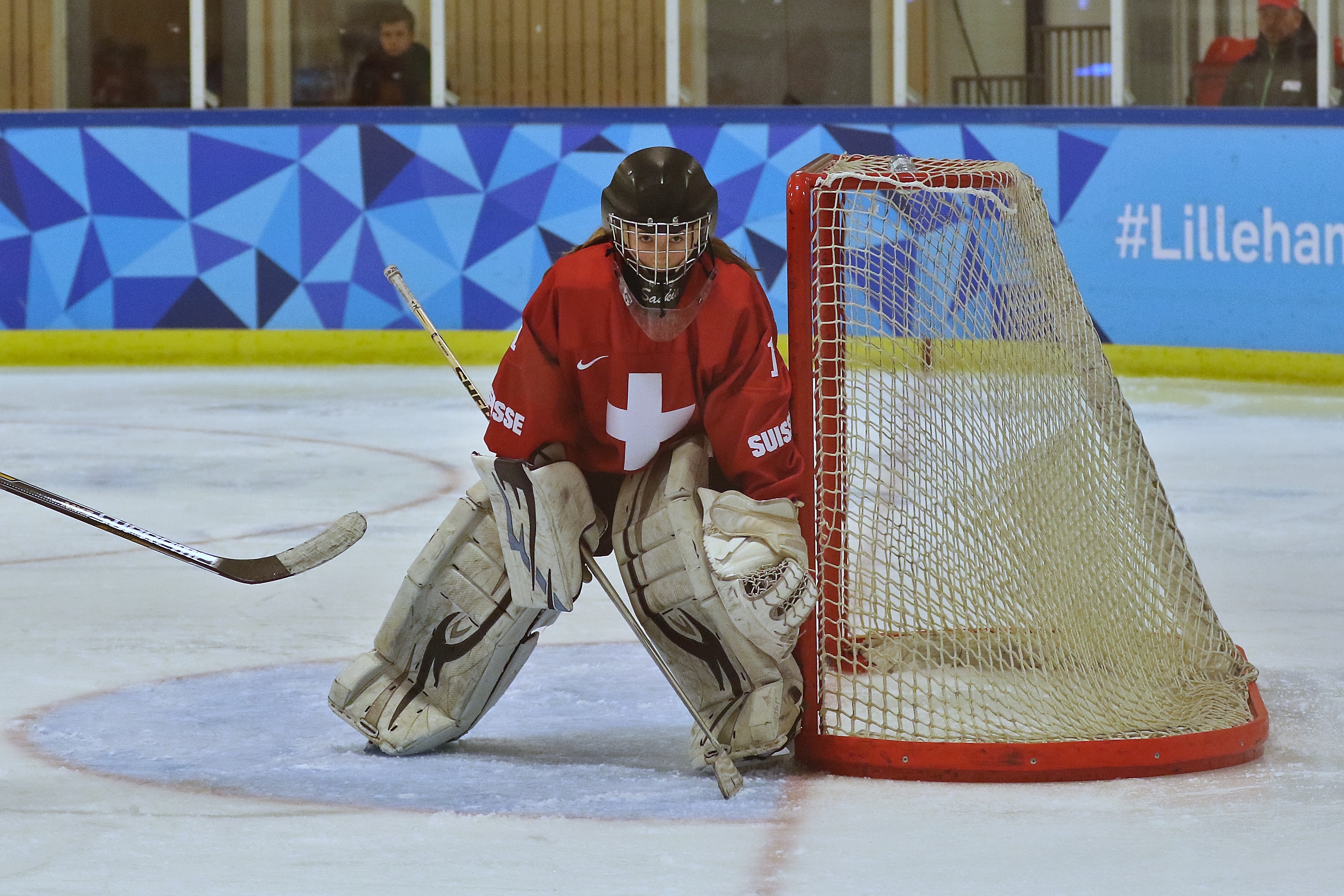
- Maurer in Lillehammer (2016) against Sweden
- Born: 29 July 2001 (age 25) Röthenbach im Emmental, Bern, Switzerland
- Height: 1.66 m (5 ft 5 in)
- Weight: 60 kg (132 lb; 9 st 6 lb)
- Position: Goaltender
- Catches: Left
- PWHL team Former teams: Vegas Vanguards; SC Bern Frauen; St. Thomas Tommies; EV Bomo Thun; EHC Thun
- National team: Switzerland
- Playing career: 2018–present
Medal record
Olympic Games
Bronze medal – third place	2026 Milano Cortina	Team

Saskia Maurer (born 29 July 2001) is a Swiss ice hockey goaltender for the Vegas Vanguards of the PWHL and member of the Swiss national ice hockey team. She played for the Swiss U18 national team, then for the St. Thomas Tommies women's ice hockey program in the Western Collegiate Hockey Association (WCHA) conference of the NCAA Division I for her collegiate career. She joined the SWHL's SC Bern Frauen for the 2023 season. In the 2026 PWHL draft, she was selected in the fourth round, 41st overall, by the Vegas Vanguards, signing a two-year contract later that year.

== Playing career ==
=== International ===
Maurer represented Switzerland in the women's ice hockey tournament at the 2022 Winter Olympics in Beijing and at the IIHF Women's World Championship in 2019, 2021, and 2022. As a junior player with the Swiss national under-18 team, she participated in the IIHF U18 Women's World Championship in 2017, 2018, and 2019. At the 2016 Winter Youth Olympics in Lillehammer, she won a bronze medal with the Swiss under-16 team in the girls' ice hockey tournament.

On 6 February 2026, Maurer gained her first Olympic start for Switzerland, making 33 saves in a 4-3 shootout win.

== Career statistics ==
=== International ===
Note: GP = Games played; Min, TOI = Minutes played; W = Wins; L = Losses; T,T/OT = Ties; OTL = Overtime losses; GA = Goals-against; GAA = Goals-against average; SO = Shutouts; SV% = Save percentage;

				Regular season
Year	Team	Event	Result	GP	W	L	T/OT	MIN	GA	SO	GAA	SV%
2017	Switzerland U18	U18 WC	7th	5	2	1	0	315:00	9	0	1.71	94.9
2018	Switzerland U18	U18 WC	7th	5	2	3	0	297:52	12	1	2.42	91.4
2019	Switzerland U18	U18 WC	6th	5	2	2	0	250:00	8	1	1.55	94.8
2021	Switzerland	WC	4th	5	1	2	0	214:03	7	0	1.96	94.2
2022	Switzerland	WC	4th	3	0	3	0	128:58	14	0	6.51	87.6
2022	Switzerland	OG	4th	2	0	2	0	80:00	11	0	8.25	83.1
2023	Switzerland	WC	4th	2	0	2	0	100:00	13	0	7.80	84.2
2024	Switzerland	WC	5th	2	1	1	0	79:36	6	0	4.52	84.6
2025	Switzerland	WC	5th	3	1	2	0	159:22	6	0	2.26	91.4
2026	Switzerland	OG	3rd place, bronze medalist(s)	3	1	2	0	184:21	10	0	3.25	91.8
