= Kristýna Bláhová =

Czech ice hockey player

- Born: 2 October 2000 (age 26) Tábor, Czech Republic
- Height: 1.65 m (5 ft 5 in)
- Weight: 61 kg (134 lb; 9 st 8 lb)
- Position: Goaltender
- Catches: Left
- ČSLH team Former teams: HC Příbram; HC Slavia Praha
- National team: Czech Republic
- Playing career: 2006–present
Medal record
Representing Czech Republic
Women's ball hockey
World Championship
Silver medal – second place	2022 Canada	Ball hockey
Women's ice hockey
World University Games
Bronze medal – third place	2023 Lake Placid	Ice hockey

Kristýna Bláhová (born 10 February 2000) is a Czech ice hockey player for HC Příbram and the Czech national team.

She participated at the 2017 IIHF Women's World Championship.
