= Josefin Bouveng =

Swedish ice hockey player (born 2001)

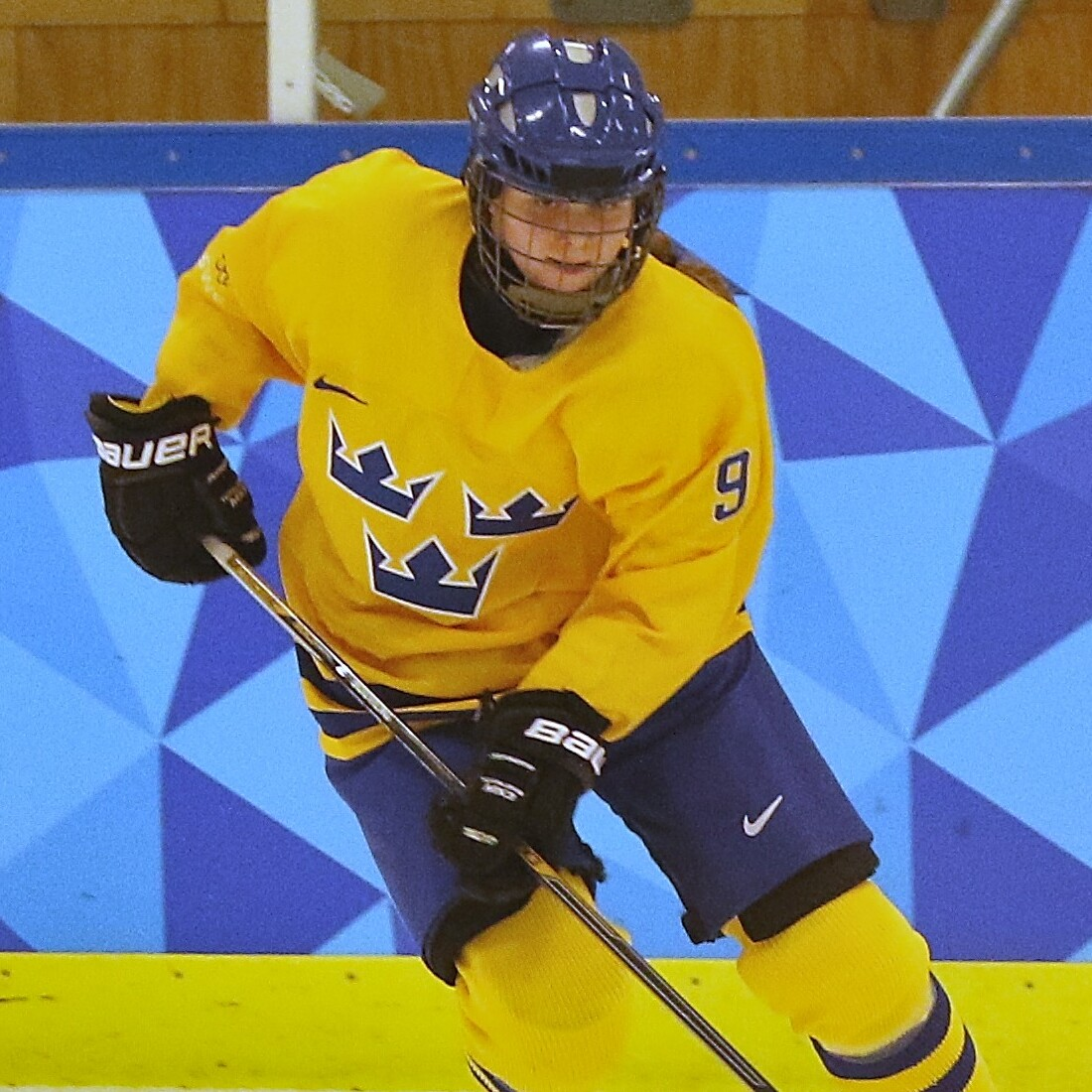
- Bouveng at the 2016 Winter Youth Olympics
- Born: 15 May 2001 (age 25) Uppsala, Sweden
- Height: 175 cm (5 ft 9 in)
- Position: Centre
- Shoots: Left
- PWHL team Former teams: Vegas Vanguards; Minnesota Golden Gophers; Brynäs IF; Djurgårdens IF Hockey
- National team: Sweden
- Playing career: 2017–present
Medal record
World Championship
Bronze medal – third place	2026 Denmark

Sara Josefin Agnes Bouveng (born 15 May 2001) is a Swedish ice hockey centre for the Vegas Vanguards and member of the Swedish national team.

== Playing career ==
As a youth player, Bouveng played on the boy's junior side of Wings HC Arlanda.

She signed with Djurgårdens IF Hockey to begin her Swedish Women's Hockey League (SDHL) career in 2017. She put up 12 points in 33 games in her rookie SDHL season before improving to 26 points in 27 games in 2018–19, the most by an SDHL player under the age of 18. In the 2019–20 season, her point production dropped back down to 12, but she led the entire league in faceoff percentage.

She was due to move to North America to study at Princeton University and play with the Princeton Tigers women's ice hockey program beginning with the 2020–21 season, but the COVID-19 pandemic prompted her to postpone those plans. She opted to remain in Sweden and sign with Brynäs IF for the 2020–21 SDHL season instead.

She began her college ice hockey career at Minnesota during the 2022–23 season.

Bouveng was selected in the third round, 29th overall, by the Vegas Vanguards in the 2026 PWHL Draft. On 6 October 2026, the team announced that she had signed a two-year standard player agreement through the 2027–28 season.

== International play ==
Bouveng made her debut with the Swedish national under-18 team at the age of 14. She won gold with the country at the 2016 Winter Youth Olympics and played in three IIHF U18 Women's World Championships, winning silver in 2018. On 19 January 2022, Bouveng was named to the Swedish team for the women's ice hockey tournament at the 2022 Winter Olympics in Beijing.

On 12 January 2026, she was named to Sweden's roster to compete at the 2026 Winter Olympics. Bouveng contributed a goal and an assist on February 10 in a 4–0 win versus Japan, preventing them from reaching the quarterfinal round.

== Career statistics ==
=== Regular season and playoffs ===
			Regular season					Playoffs
Season	Team	League	GP	G	A	Pts	PIM	GP	G	A	Pts	PIM
2017–18	Djurgårdens IF	SDHL	33	6	6	12	8	4	1	2	3	0
2018–19	Djurgårdens IF	SDHL	27	14	12	26	4	4	2	1	3	4
2019–20	Djurgårdens IF	SDHL	25	8	4	12	14	5	1	2	3	0
2020–21	Brynäs IF	SDHL	36	24	23	47	2	7	13	5	18	4
2021–22	Brynäs IF	SDHL	28	24	22	46	2	10	7	4	11	4
2022–23	University of Minnesota	WCHA	33	9	7	16	0	—	—	—	—	—
2023–24	University of Minnesota	WCHA	39	19	31	50	12	—	—	—	—	—
SDHL totals			149	76	67	143	30	30	24	14	38	21

=== International ===
Year	Team	Event	Result	GP	G	A	Pts	PIM
2016	Sweden	YOG	1st place, gold medalist(s)	6	4	1	5	2
2017	Sweden	U18	4th	6	1	2	3	0
2018	Sweden	U18	2nd place, silver medalist(s)	5	1	3	4	0
2019	Sweden	U18	5th	5	1	2	3	6
2021	Sweden	OGQ	Q	3	2	3	5	0
2022	Sweden	OG	8th	5	1	0	1	0
2022	Sweden	WC	7th	6	0	1	1	0
2023	Sweden	WC	6th	7	0	1	1	0
2024	Sweden	WC	7th	5	4	1	5	0
2025	Sweden	WC	6th	6	2	3	5	0
2025	Sweden	OGQ	Q	3	1	0	1	0
2026	Sweden	OG	4th	5	1	0	1	0
2026	Sweden	WC	3rd place, bronze medalist(s)	7	0	3	3	2
Junior totals				16	3	7	10	6
Senior totals				41	8	9	17	2
