= Anna Amholt =

Swedish ice hockey goaltender

- Born: 28 March 2000 (age 26) Gothenburg, Sweden
- Height: 182 cm (6 ft 0 in)
- Weight: 78 kg (172 lb; 12 st 4 lb)
- Position: Goaltender
- Caught: Left
- Played for: HV71; Luleå HF/MSSK; Hovås HC
- Playing career: 2012–2022

Anna Amholt (born 28 March 2000) is a Swedish retired ice hockey goaltender. Considered by many to be the next great goaltending talent of the Swedish national ice hockey team, her career was halted when she contracted COVID-19 in April 2020 and continued experiencing long-term symptoms. which ultimately led her to retire from ice hockey in October 2022.

== Playing career ==
From 2016 to 2018, she played for Luleå HF/MSSK, splitting her time between the club's team in the Swedish Women's Hockey League (SDHL) and its second side in the Damettan. She won the Swedish Championship with Luleå in 2018.

Amholt signed with AIK IF ahead of the 2018–19 SDHL season. She held two shutouts in a row in the first weeks of October 2018. She then missed part of the season due to a concussion suffered during training.

Ahead of the 2019–20 season, she signed with HV71 Dam. She was sidelined after playing only five games, however, as she suffered another concussion and was forced to miss most of the season.

At age 20, she fell ill with COVID-19 during the pandemic in the spring of 2020 and was hospitalised in November 2020 after struggling with continuing issues from long COVID.

== International career ==
Amholt won a gold medal with the Swedish national under-16 team in the girls' ice hockey tournament at the 2016 Winter Youth Olympics in Lillehammer. With the Swedish national under-18 team, she participated in the IIHF U18 Women's World Championship in 2017 and 2018. She was named Best Goaltender of the tournament in 2018, as Sweden claimed the silver medal.
