= Adéla Škrdlová =

Czech ice hockey player

- Born: 16 February 2001 (age 25)
- Height: 5 ft 6 in (168 cm)
- Weight: 119 lb (54 kg; 8 st 7 lb)
- Position: Defence
- Shoots: Left
- ČSLH team: SK Horácká Slavia Třebíč
- National team: Czech Republic
- Playing career: 2016–present

Adéla Škrdlová (born 16 February 2001) is a Czech ice hockey player for SK Horácká Slavia Třebíč and the Czech national team.

She participated at the 2017 IIHF Women's World Championship.
