= Laura Lerchová =

Czech ice hockey player

- Born: 13 June 2000 (age 26) Třinec, Czech Republic
- Height: 170 cm (5 ft 7 in)
- Weight: 69 kg (152 lb; 10 st 12 lb)
- Position: Right wing
- Shoots: Left
- SDHL team Former teams: Skellefteå AIK; MODO Hockey; SK Karviná
- National team: Czech Republic
- Playing career: 2014–present
Medal record
World Championship
Bronze medal – third place	2022 Denmark

Laura Lerchová (born 13 June 2000) is a Czech ice hockey forward, currently playing in the Svenska spel Damhockeyligan (SDHL) with Skellefteå AIK.

== Playing career ==
Lerchová made her senior women's league debut with SK Karviná during the 2014–15 season of the Czech Women's Extraliga. She continued with SK Karviná through the 2017–18 season and concurrently played with the under-16 (U16) men's team of HC Oceláři Třinec in the Extraliga dorostu, the highest-level national U16 league in the Czech Republic.

At age seventeen, she signed a two-season contract with MODO Hockey of the Swedish Women's Hockey League (SDHL). Following the 2019–20 SDHL season, she announced that she would not re-sign with MODO and was leaving after two seasons with the club.

In May 2020, Lerchová signed with Skellefteå AIK of the Damettan (reconfigured as the NDHL in 2022), the league directly below the SDHL, on a one season contract with an option for a second season (1+1). At the time of her signing, team manager Ulrika Dahlgren identified Lerchová as a "spearhead" for team building, who would help Skellefteå AIK realize its goal of promotion to the SDHL.

Lerchová quickly established herself as a top scorer on the team, ranking in the top-three of Skellefteå AIK players for points in the 2020–21 season, which was shorted to just four games by the COVID-19 pandemic. She led the team in scoring during the 2021–22 season, tallying nine more points than the second-highest scorer, and again in the 2022–23 season, in which she notched 37 points in 26 games.

Lerchová maintained her elite offensive production after re-signing with Skellefteå AIK in 2023 and scored the second-most points on the team, with 12 goals and 27 points in 25 games played. Together with her regular season results, her five points in six games of the Kvalserie till SDHL ('Qualification series for SDHL') helped the team achieve victory in the finals and earn promotion to the SDHL. She scored the opening goal of the promotion-clinching match versus AIK Hockey, a power play goal assisted by Sara Bjurvén and Sierra Benjamin.

== International play ==
Lerchová first represented the Czech Republic on the international stage with the national under-16 team that participated in the girls' ice hockey tournament at the 2016 Winter Youth Olympics in Lillehammer, Norway. She was the team's top scorer, contributing two goals and three points to the Czech Republic's silver medal finish.

As a junior player with the Czech national under-18 team, she participated in the IIHF U18 Women's World Championships in 2017 and 2018. At the 2018 tournament, her five assists led all Czech players and tied for fifth on the tournament assist leaders table. She ranked second on the team and twelfth of all tournament players in points, with six.

Her first invitation to the senior national team came during the 2015–16 season and she played in one international friendly match that year. Lerchová went on to play with the Czech national team in a limited number of international friendlies over the following seven seasons and appeared in Euro Hockey Tour tournaments during the 2019–20 and 2022–23 seasons, among other international matches.

Lerchová was named to the Czech roster for the 2022 IIHF Women's World Championship and traveled with the team but she did not play in the tournament.
