= Noemi Ryhner =

Swiss ice hockey player

- Born: 24 April 2000 (age 26) Zug, Switzerland
- Height: 1.65 m (5 ft 5 in)
- Weight: 59 kg (130 lb; 9 st 4 lb)
- Position: Left wing
- Shoots: Left
- SDHL team Former teams: Leksands IF: Luleå HF/MSSK; HC Ladies Lugano; ZSC Lions; SC Reinach
- National team: Switzerland
- Playing career: 2015–present

Noemi Ryhner (born 24 April 2000) is a Swiss ice hockey player and member of the Swiss national team, currently playing in the Swedish Women's Hockey League (SDHL) with Leksands IF Dam.

== Playing career ==
Ryhner made her Swiss Women's Hockey League A (SWHL A) debut with the ZSC Lions Frauen in 2015. After winning the 2016 and 2017 SWHL A championships with the team, she transferred to SC Reinach Damen in 2017. After scoring 41 points in 38 games with Reinach over three years with the club, she transferred to the Ladies Team Lugano for the 2020–21 season.

=== International ===
As a junior player with the Swiss national under-18 team, Ryhner participated in the IIHF U18 Women's World Championship in 2015, 2016, 2017, and 2018. She served as team captain at the 2017 tournament.

At the 2016 Winter Youth Olympics in Lillehammer, she won a bronze medal in the girls' ice hockey tournament while serving as an alternate captain to the Swiss under-16 team.

Ryhner made her senior national team debut at the 2019 IIHF Women's World Championship. She was named to the Swiss roster for the 2020 IIHF Women's World Championship, before the tournament was cancelled due to the COVID-19 pandemic. In August 2020, it was announced she was one of twelve players selected by the Swiss Ice Hockey Federation to take part in the new national team Swiss Women's Hockey Academy.

She represented Switzerland in the women's ice hockey tournament at the 2022 Winter Olympics in Beijing, and at the IIHF Women's World Championship in 2021 and 2022.
