= Lina Ljungblom =

Swedish ice hockey player (born 2001)

- Born: 15 October 2001 (age 25) Skövde, Sweden
- Height: 1.67 m (5 ft 6 in)
- Weight: 79 kg (174 lb; 12 st 6 lb)
- Position: Centre
- Shoots: Left
- PWHL team Former teams: Montreal Victoire; MoDo Hockey; HV71; Skövde IK
- National team: Sweden
- Playing career: 2018–present
Medal record
World Championship
| Bronze medal – third place | 2026 Denmark |

Lina Elsa Ljungblom (born 15 October 2001) is a Swedish ice hockey player for the Montreal Victoire of the Professional Women's Hockey League (PWHL) and member of Sweden women's national ice hockey team.

== Playing career ==
From 2015 to 2019, Ljungblom played for Skövde IK, splitting her time between the club's boys' U16 and U18 teams, as well as the club's third-tier women's team. In October 2018, she was loaned to HV71 in the Swedish Women's Hockey League (SDHL) for a game after HV71 suffered a number of injuries. She scored twice in her SDHL debut, as HV71 beat Brynäs IF 6–1.

For the 2019–20 season, she chose to spend most of her time with HV71 in the SDHL, appearing in only four games with Skövde's boys' U20 squad – though she scored five points in that span. She missed large parts of the season, however, after breaking her collarbone in October 2019. She finished the season with 5 points in 20 games for HV71, adding another 3 points in 6 playoff games as the club made it to the championship finals before the season was cancelled due to the COVID-19 pandemic in Sweden.

After voicing concerns about her development with HV71, she left the club to sign with Modo Hockey ahead of the 2020–21 SDHL season. In November 2020, she was suspended for three matches for abuse of an official after shouting "fuck you" at the referee in a 5–3 loss to SDE Hockey.

Ljungblom was drafted by PWHL Montreal with the final pick of the 2023 PWHL Draft. Ljungblom was obligated to finish her contract with MoDo Hockey, which extended through the conclusion of the 2023–24 SDHL season, as the club chose not to relinquish her rights early. After her contract was up, she signed a three-year contract with Montreal and joined them for the 2024–25 season. During the 2026 PWHL Expansion Draft, she was one of three players, who were allowed to be protected in the third round by Montreal.

== International play ==
As a member of the Swedish national under-18 team, Ljungblom participated in the IIHF World U18 Championships in 2017, 2018, and 2019, picking up a total of 10 points across 16 games and winning silver in 2018.

Ljungblom made her senior national team debut during the 2018–19 Women's Euro Hockey Tour. Her first major tournament representing Sweden was the 2019 IIHF Women's World Championship, at which she did not pick up any points in five games and the team was relegated from the IIHF Top Division for the first time in history.

She contributed three goals in three games at the qualification tournament for the 2022 Winter Olympics, helping Sweden secure placement in the Games. As a member of the Swedish delegation at the 2022 Winter Olympics in Beijing, Ljungblom played in the women's ice hockey tournament and recorded one assist in five games.

On 12 January 2026, she was named to Sweden's roster to compete at the 2026 Winter Olympics.

On February 5, 2026, Sweden's first game at the Olympics, Ljungblom scored twice, defeating Germany in a 4-1 final. Her first goal of the game represented Sweden's 100th goal in Olympic women's ice hockey history.

== Career statistics ==
=== Regular season and playoffs ===
Note: GP = Games played; G = Goals; A = Assists; Pts = Points; PIM = Penalty minutes;

| | | | Regular season | | | | | Playoffs |
| Season | Team | League | GP | G | A | Pts | PIM | GP | G | A | Pts | PIM |
|---|---|---|---|---|---|---|---|---|---|---|---|---|
| 2015–16 | Skövde HC | Div. 2 | 10 | 26 | 10 | 36 | 4 | — | — | — | — | — |
| 2016–17 | Skövde HC | Div. 2 | 6 | 11 | 12 | 23 | 2 | — | — | — | — | — |
| 2017–18 | Skövde HC | Div. 2 | 6 | 23 | 9 | 32 | 2 | — | — | — | — | — |
| 2018–19 | Skövde HC | Div. 2 | 4 | 8 | 7 | 15 | 0 | — | — | — | — | — |
| 2018–19 | Skövde IK | J20 Elit† | 1 | 0 | 0 | 0 | 0 | — | — | — | — | — |
| 2018–19 | HV71 | SDHL | 1 | 2 | 0 | 2 | 2 | 4 | 3 | 0 | 3 | 2 |
| 2019–20 | Skövde IK | J20 Div. 1† | 4 | 3 | 2 | 5 | 0 | — | — | — | — | — |
| 2019–20 | HV71 | SDHL | 20 | 4 | 1 | 5 | 6 | 6 | 2 | 1 | 3 | 4 |
| 2020–21 | Modo Hockey | SDHL | 33 | 14 | 16 | 30 | 43 | 2 | 1 | 2 | 3 | 50 |
| 2021–22 | Modo Hockey | SDHL | 30 | 20 | 11 | 31 | 20 | 3 | 0 | 4 | 4 | 22 |
| 2022–23 | Modo Hockey | SDHL | 32 | 17 | 13 | 30 | 8 | 5 | 2 | 2 | 4 | 0 |
| 2023–24 | Modo Hockey | SDHL | 36 | 23 | 23 | 46 | 12 | 10 | 8 | 2 | 10 | 6 |
| 2024–25 | Montreal Victoire | PWHL | 29 | 3 | 3 | 6 | 8 | 4 | 0 | 0 | 0 | 0 |
| PWHL totals | | | 29 | 3 | 3 | 6 | 8 | 4 | 0 | 0 | 0 | 0 |

†Denotes men's junior hockey league

=== International ===
Note: GP = Games played; G = Goals; A = Assists; Pts = Points; PIM = Penalty minutes;

| | | | | Regular season |
| Year | Team | Event | Result | GP | G | A | Pts | PIM |
|---|---|---|---|---|---|---|---|---|
| 2017 | Sweden | U18 | 4th | 6 | 0 | 1 | 1 | 4 |
| 2018 | Sweden | U18 | 2nd place, silver medalist(s) | 5 | 4 | 2 | 6 | 10 |
| 2019 | Sweden | U18 | 5th | 5 | 2 | 1 | 3 | 6 |
| 2019 | Sweden | WC | 9th | 5 | 0 | 0 | 0 | 0 |
| 2022 | Sweden | OG | 8th | 5 | 0 | 1 | 1 | 0 |
| 2022 | Sweden | WC | 8th | 5 | 1 | 1 | 2 | 25 |
| 2023 | Sweden | WC | 6th | 7 | 7 | 3 | 10 | 6 |
| 2024 | Sweden | WC | 7th | 5 | 2 | 1 | 3 | 2 |
| 2025 | Sweden | WC | 6th | 6 | 2 | 1 | 3 | 2 |
| 2026 | Sweden | OG | 4th | 7 | 2 | 1 | 3 | 0 |
| 2025 | Sweden | WC | 3rd place, bronze medalist(s) | 7 | 2 | 2 | 4 | 8 |
| Junior totals | | | | 16 | 6 | 4 | 10 | 20 |
| Senior totals | | | | 47 | 16 | 10 | 26 | 43 |

== Awards and honours ==
| Honours | Year |
PWHL
| Walter Cup champion | 2026 |
