= Mina Waxin =

Swedish ice hockey player

- Born: 29 April 2001 (age 25) Stockholm, Sweden
- Height: 1.65 m (5 ft 5 in)
- Weight: 68 kg (150 lb; 10 st 10 lb)
- Position: Defense
- Shoots: Left
- SDHL team Former teams: Brynäs IF: MoDo Hockey; Djurgårdens IF; Haninge HC; Hammarby Hockey
- National team: Sweden
- Playing career: 2016–present

Mina Waxin (born 29 April 2001) is a Swedish ice hockey player and member of the Swedish national team, currently playing in the Swedish Women's Hockey League (SDHL) with Brynäs IF Dam.

She represented Sweden in the women's ice hockey tournament at the 2022 Winter Olympics in Beijing and at the IIHF Women's World Championships in 2019 and 2022.
