= Sofie Lundin =

Swedish ice hockey player (born 2000)

- Born: 15 February 2000 (age 26) Helsingborg, Sweden
- Height: 1.64 m (5 ft 5 in)
- Weight: 63 kg (139 lb; 9 st 13 lb)
- Position: Forward
- Shoots: Left
- SDHL team Former teams: Frölunda HC; Djurgårdens IF
- National team: Sweden
- Playing career: 2016–present
Medal record
World Championship
| Bronze medal – third place | 2026 Denmark |

Sofie Lundin (born 15 February 2000) is a Swedish ice hockey player for Frölunda HC of the Swedish Women's Hockey League (SDHL) and a member of the Swedish national ice hockey team.

== International play ==
She represented Sweden at the 2019 IIHF Women's World Championship.

On 12 January 2026, she was named to Sweden's roster to compete at the 2026 Winter Olympics.
