= Wilma Carlsson =

Swedish footballer (born 2000)

Personal information
- Full name: Wilma Amanda Carlsson
- Date of birth: 18 July 2000 (age 26)
- Position: Centre-back

Team information
- Current team: Malmö FF
- Number: 5

Youth career
- Furunäs/Bullmarks IK
- Sävar IK
- 2014–2015: Umeå IK

Senior career*
Years	Team	Apps	(Gls)
2015–2022	Umeå IK	54	(2)
2020	→ Sunnanå SK (loan)	13	(1)
2023–2025	Piteå IF	68	(1)
2026–	Malmö FF	8	(0)

International career^{‡}
2017–2018	Sweden U17	3	(0)
2023–2024	Sweden U23	13	(0)
- * Club domestic league appearances and goals as of 01:25, 22 July 2026 (UTC) ‡ National team caps and goals as of 17:57, 8 August 2025 (UTC)

Wilma Amanda Carlsson (born 18 July 2000) is a Swedish professional footballer who plays as a centre-back for Damallsvenskan club Malmö FF. She has previously played for Umeå IK, Piteå IF, and on loan in the Elitettan for Sunnanå SK.

== Youth career ==
Carlsson grew up in the town of Bullmark, where she first began playing football at the age of 6 with Furunäs/Bullmarks IK's mixed team. She then moved on to Sävar IK before being invited to try out for Umeå IK's under-19 squad. Carlsson's trial was successful and she joined the team at the age of 14.

== Club career ==
=== Umeå IK ===
==== 2015–2019 ====
Within a year of joining Umeå's youth team, Carlsson was promoted to the senior squad and made her professional debut as a 15-year-old. She faced an ample helping of injuries at the start of her senior career and only made 3 league appearances in her first 3 years of play. One of Carlsson's most devastating injuries was a Cruciate ligament tear that kept her sidelined for much of 2018 and 2019.

==== Sunnanå SK (loan) ====
After recovering from her knee injury, Carlsson participated in a few games with Umeå before joining fellow Elitettan club Sunnanå SK on loan in 2020. She scored her first goal with the team on 16 August, contributing to a 3–0 win over Kvarnsvedens IK that marked Sunnanå's first victory of the season after having participated in 11 matches. In the end, Sunnanå experienced an unsuccessful season in which they finished in last place of the league. Carlsson herself ended her loan spell on an unpleasant note, conceding an own goal in Sunnanå's final match of the season. She made a total of 13 Elitettan appearances for the club.

==== 2021–2022 ====
Upon returning to Umeå, Carlsson re-signed with the team. She ended up having one of her most consistent seasons yet, playing in a career-high 24 matches. She cemented her position as a centre-back, forming a strong partnership with experienced teammate Lisa Dahlkvist. At the end of the season, Carlsson agreed to extend her contract with Umeå through yet another year as the team readied to return to the Damallsvenskan for the first time since 2016.

Although the start of the season went well for Carlsson, injuries struck again and she missed the spring portion of the campaign due to an ankle issue. She ended up appearing in 14 games as Umeå struggled to evade relegation. Ultimately, while the team had a chance to stay in the Damallsvenskan for 2023, a defeat to Kristianstad in the final match of its season confirmed relegation. It would prove to be Carlsson's final game in her Umeå career, as she then left the club in search of a new opportunity. Over her nine years as a member of Umeå, Carlsson had participated in 18 Damallsvenskan and 50 Elitettan matches.

=== Piteå IF ===
On 30 December 2022, Carlsson inked a two-year deal with Damallsvenskan club Piteå IF. In doing so, she joined former Umeå teammates Tuva Skoog and Olivia Holm. Carlsson won her first piece of silverware with the club in 2024, helping Piteå earn its first-ever Svenska Cupen title.

Despite missing one game due to illness and another due to suspension, Carlsson further established her role as a constant in Piteå's squad in 2025. On 17 May, she scored her first Damallsvenskan goal in a 2–1 loss to Hammarby. She went on to make 68 league and 12 cup appearances in her three years at Piteå.

=== Malmö FF ===
In December 2025, Carlsson joined Malmö FF on a three-year deal. She made her first few appearances for the club in the Svenska Cupen, playing three matches against teams including her former side, Piteå IF. The following month, she made her Damallsvenskan debut for Malmö, contributing to a clean sheet against IK Uppsala.

== International career ==
Carlsson started playing for the Sweden under-17 national team in 2017. She appeared in 3 matches before a set of injuries hampered her progress. Then, in 2023 and 2024, Carlsson made 13 appearances with Sweden's under-23 squad. She has since captained the U23s.

In January 2023, Carlsson received her first call-up to the Sweden senior national team for a training camp in Algarve, Portugal. Although Carlsson had not been initially chosen for the squad, a concussion to Emma Östlund opened up a spot on the team.

== Personal life ==
While playing for Umeå IK, Carlsson also was enrolled in Umeå University's nursing program. She graduated from the school in February 2023.

== Career statistics ==
=== Club ===
As of 8 August 2025

Appearances and goals by club, season and competition
Club	Season	League			Cup (Note: Incluces the Svenska Cupen)		Total	
Club	Season	Division	Apps	Goals	Apps	Goals	Apps	Goals
Umeå IK	2015	Damallsvenskan	2	0	1	0	3	0
Umeå IK	2016	Damallsvenskan	1	0	—		1	0
Umeå IK	2017	Elitettan	0	0	—		0	0
Umeå IK	2018	Elitettan	7	2	—		7	2
Umeå IK	2019	Elitettan	6	0	1	0	7	0
Umeå IK	2021	Elitettan	24	0	9	0	33	0
Umeå IK	2022	Damallsvenskan	14	0	1	0	15	0
Umeå IK	Total		54	2	12	0	66	2
Sunnanå SK (loan)	2020	Elitettan	13	1	—		13	1
Piteå IF	2023	Damallsvenskan	24	0	7	1	31	1
Piteå IF	2024	Damallsvenskan	20	0	4	0	24	0
Piteå IF	2025	Damallsvenskan	10	1	—		10	1
Piteå IF	Total		54	1	11	1	65	2
Career total			121	4	23	1	144	5
