= Cross-country skiing at the 2016 Winter Youth Olympics =

Cross-country skiing at the II Winter Youth Olympic Games
- Venue: Birkebeineren Ski Stadium; Hafjell, Norway
- Dates: 13–18 February
- Competitors: 90 Quota limit

Cross-country skiing at the 2016 Winter Youth Olympics was held at the Birkebeineren Ski Stadium in Lillehammer, Norway from 13 to 18 February.

== Medal summary ==
=== Medal table ===
* Host nation (Norway)

Rank	Nation	Gold	Silver	Bronze	Total
1	South Korea	2	1	0	3
1	Sweden	2	1	0	3
3	Norway*	1	2	2	5
4	Russia	1	1	1	3
5	China	0	1	0	1
6	Finland	0	0	2	2
7	France	0	0	1	1
Totals (7 entries)		6	6	6	18

=== Events ===
==== Boys' events ====
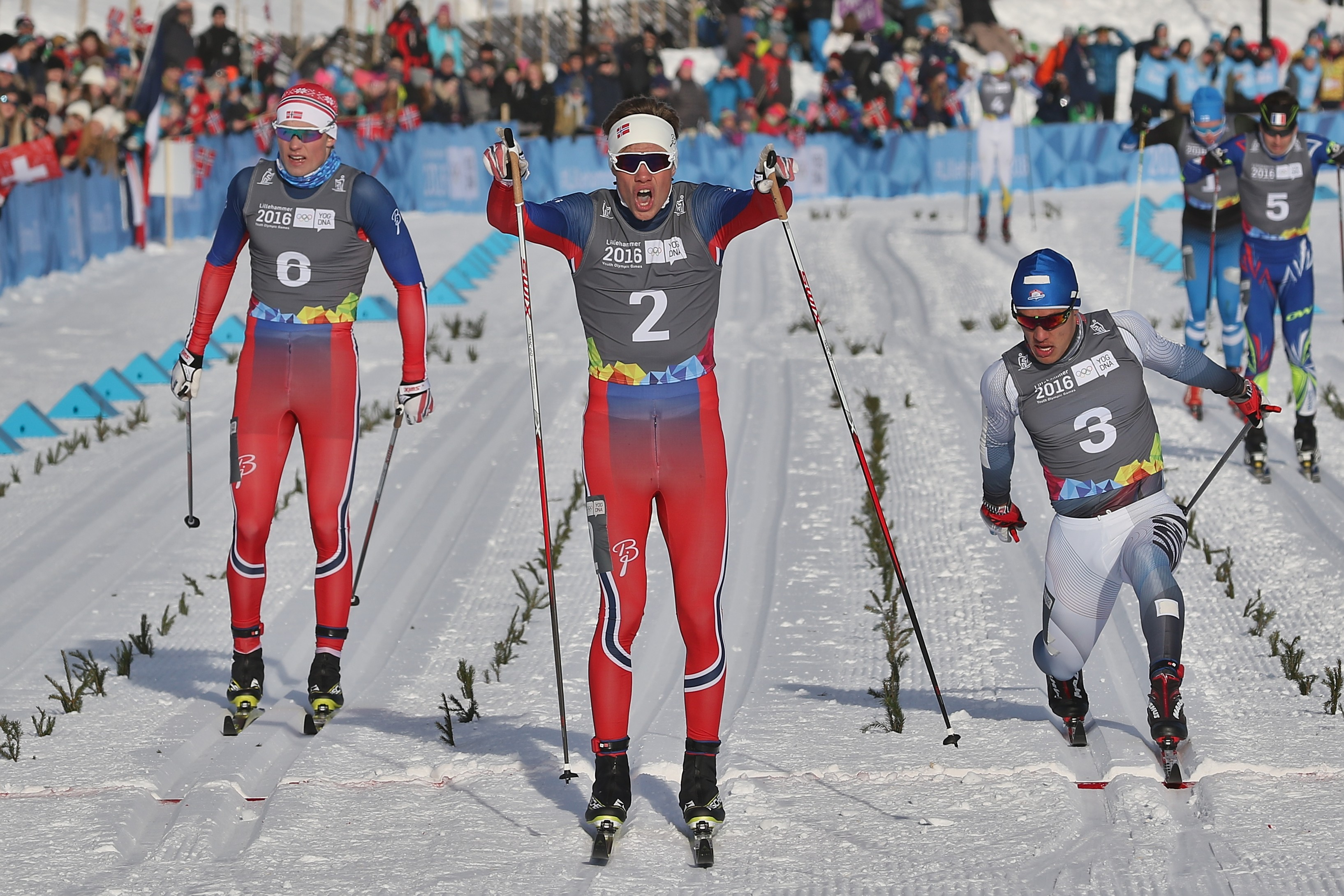
Cross country sprint classic men final

Event	Gold		Silver		Bronze	
Boys' 10 kilometres free	Kim Magnus; South Korea	23:04.8	Vebjørn Hegdal; Norway	23:20.8	Igor Fedotov; Russia	23:59.2
Boys' sprint classic	Thomas Helland Larsen; Norway	2:55.39	Kim Magnus; South Korea	2:55.72	Vebjørn Hegdal; Norway	2:56.49
Boys' cross-country cross	Kim Magnus; South Korea	2:59.56	Thomas Helland Larsen; Norway	3:00.73	Lauri Mannila; Finland	3:01.84

==== Girls' events ====
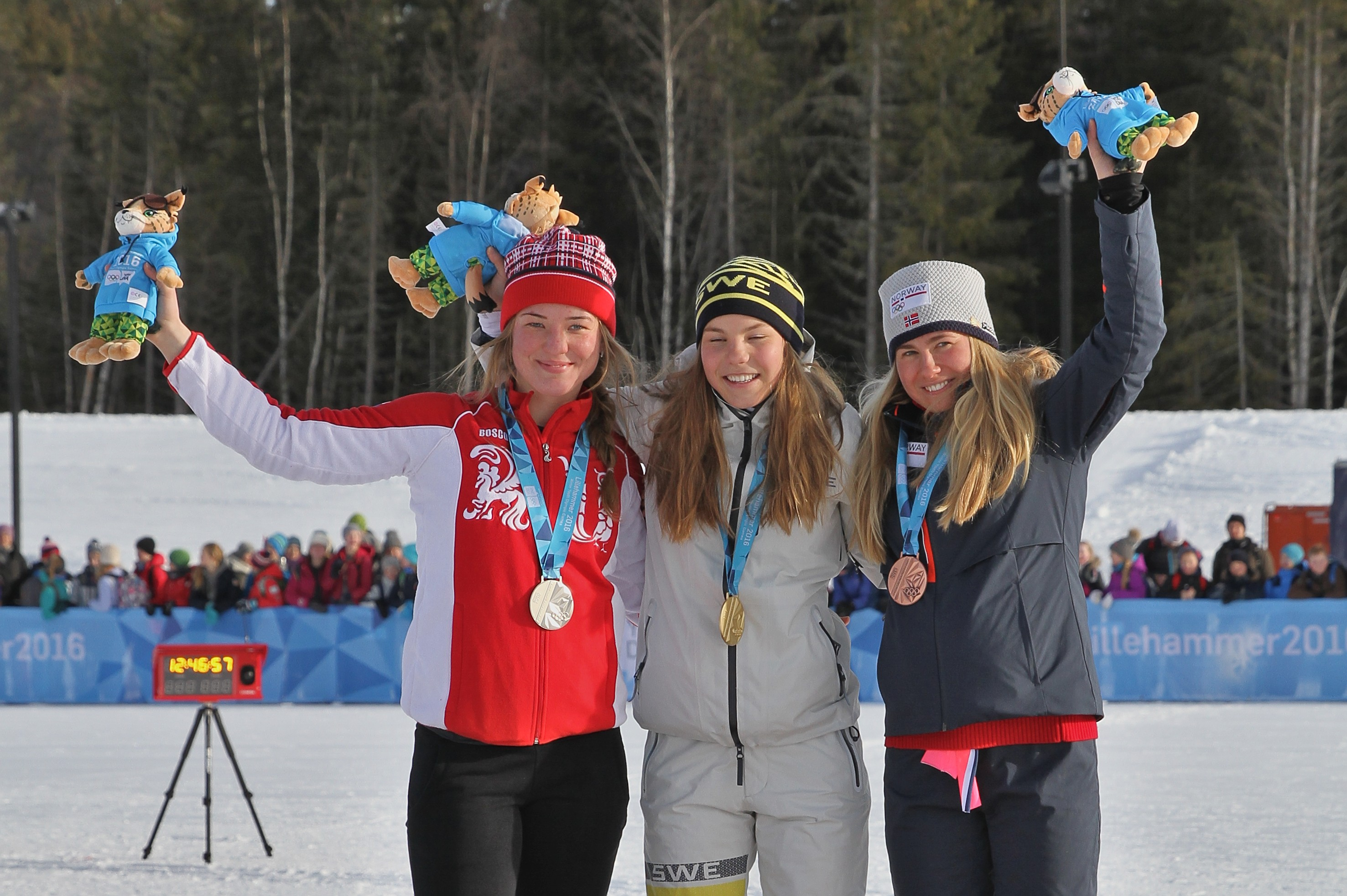
Cross country sprint classic women medalists

Event	Gold		Silver		Bronze	
Girls' 5 kilometres free	Maya Yakunina; Russia	12:58.8	Chi Chunxue; China	13:29.9	Rebecca Immonen; Finland	13:35.9
Girls' sprint classic	Johanna Hagström; Sweden	3:19.55	Yuliya Petrova; Russia	3:21.95	Martine Engebretsen; Norway	3:22.82
Girls' cross-country cross	Moa Lundgren; Sweden	3:26.35	Johanna Hagström; Sweden	3:28.09	Laura Chamiot Maitral; France	3:29.56

== Qualification system ==
Each nation could send a maximum of 4 athletes (2 boys and 2 girls). The top 7 teams of the Marc Hodler Trophy Cross-Country Skiing at the 2015 Junior Nordic World Ski Championships plus the hosts Norway were allowed to send the maximum of 4 athletes. Any remaining quota spots were distributed to nations not already qualified, with a maximum of one boy or girl from one nation. The quota limit was 90. The current allocation of quotas is listed below.

=== Qualification summary ===
NOC	Boys	Girls	Total
Andorra		1	1
Argentina	1		1
Armenia	1		1
Australia	1	1	2
Austria	1	1	2
Belarus	1	1	2
Belgium	1		1
Bosnia and Herzegovina	1	1	2
Brazil	1		1
Bulgaria	1	1	2
Canada	1	1	2
China	1	1	2
Croatia	1	1	2
Czech Republic	1	1	2
Denmark	1		1
Estonia	1	1	2
Finland	2	2	4
France	2	2	4
Germany	2	2	4
Greece	1		1
Hungary	1		1
Iceland	1		1
Italy	1	1	2
Japan	1	1	2
Kazakhstan	1	1	2
Latvia	1	1	2
Lithuania	1		1
Macedonia	1		1
Moldova	1		1
Mongolia	1		1
Norway	2	2	4
Poland	1	1	2
Romania	1	1	2
Russia	2	2	4
Serbia		1	2
Slovakia	1	1	2
Slovenia	2	2	4
South Korea	1	1	2
Spain	1	1	2
Sweden	2	2	4
Switzerland	2	2	4
Turkey	1	1	2
Ukraine	1	1	2
United States	1	1	2
Total athletes	50	40	90
Total NOCs	42	32	44
