= Short-track speed skating at the 2016 Winter Youth Olympics =

Short track speed skating at the II Winter Youth Olympic Games
- Venue: Gjøvik Olympic Cavern Hall, Gjøvik, Norway
- Dates: 14–20 February
- Competitors: 32 Quota limit

Short track speed skating at the 2016 Winter Youth Olympics was held at the Gjøvik Olympic Cavern Hall in Gjøvik, Norway from 14 to 20 February.

== Medal summary ==
=== Medal table ===
Rank	Nation	Gold	Silver	Bronze	Total
1	South Korea	3	1	0	4
2	China	1	1	1	3
–	Mixed-NOCs	1	1	1	3
3	Hungary	0	1	1	2
4	Japan	0	1	0	1
5	Bulgaria	0	0	1	1
5	Germany	0	0	1	1
Totals (6 entries)		5	5	5	15

=== Events ===
==== Boys' events ====
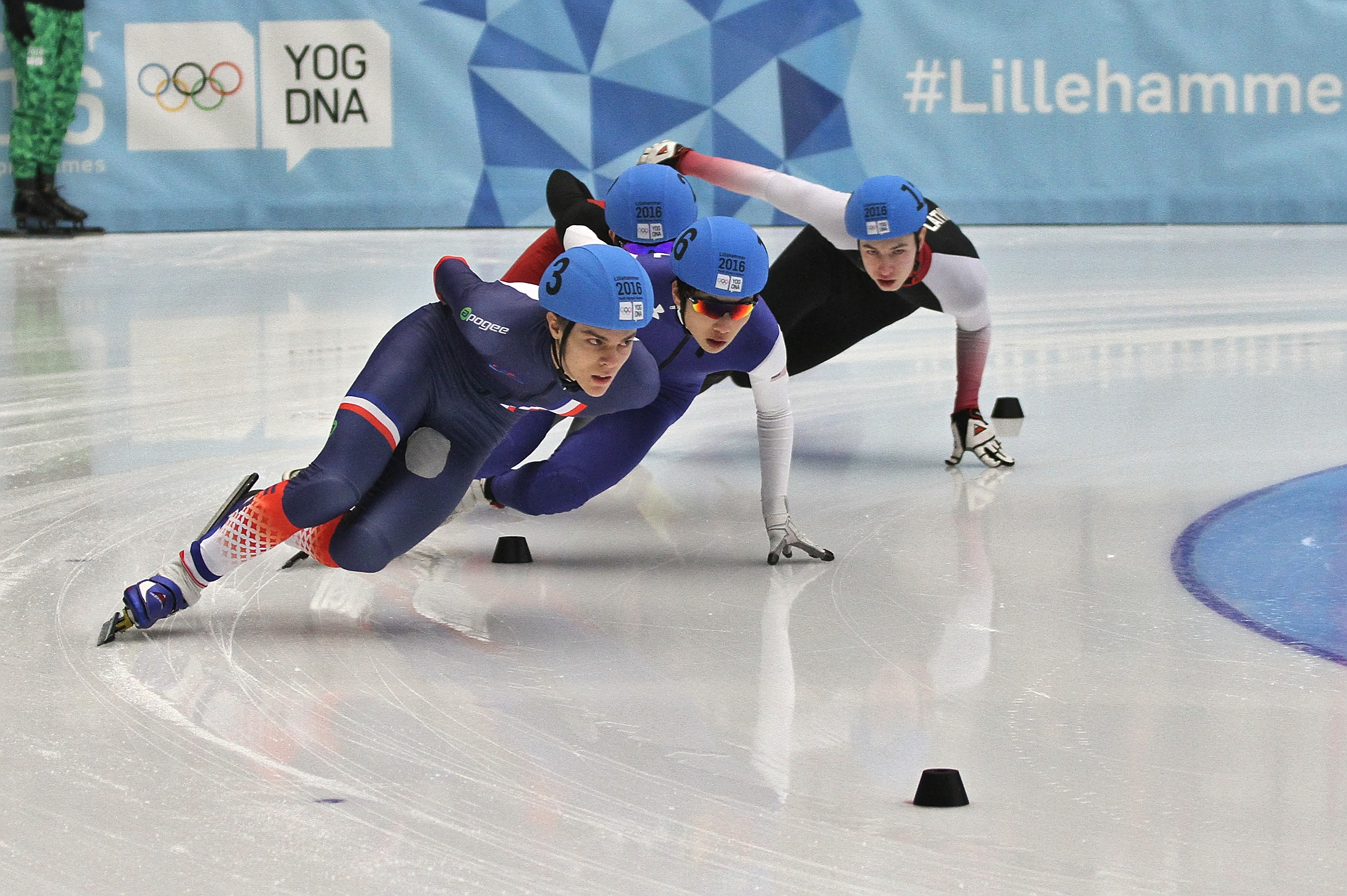
Short Track Speed Skating: Men's 1000m Quarterfinal 1

Event	Gold		Silver		Bronze	
Boys' 500 metres	Hong Kyung-hwan; South Korea	41.885	Kazuki Yoshinaga; Japan	41.969	Ma Wei; China	42.129
Boys' 1000 metres	Hwang Dae-heon; South Korea	1:28.022	Ma Wei; China	1:28.082	Shaoang Liu; Hungary	1:28.187

==== Girls' events ====
Event	Gold		Silver		Bronze	
Girls' 500 metres	Zang Yize; China	46.648	Petra Jászapáti; Hungary	No Time	Katrin Manoilova; Bulgaria	46.337
Girls' 1000 metres	Kim Ji-yoo; South Korea	1:34.041	Lee Su-youn; South Korea	1:34.118	Anna Seidel; Germany	1:34.323

==== Mixed events ====
Event	Gold		Silver		Bronze	
Mixed team relay	Team B Mixed-NOCs; Ane Farstad (NOR); Kim Ji-yoo (KOR); Stijn Desmet (BEL); Quentin Fercoq (FRA)	4:14.413	Team C Mixed-NOCs; Petra Jászapáti (HUN); Julia Moore (AUS); Tjerk de Boer (NED); Kiichi Shigehiro (JPN)	4:14.495	Team F Mixed-NOCs; Katrin Manoilova (BUL); Anita Nagay (KAZ); Kārlis Krūzbergs (LAT); Kazuki Yoshinaga (JPN)	4:17.181

== Qualification system ==
Each nation could send a maximum of 4 athletes (2 boys and 2 girls). The top 3 nations in the overall classification of the 2015 World Junior Short Track Speed Skating Championships could send 2 athletes per gender, the next best nations could send 1 athlete per gender until the quota was filled. The quota limit was 32. The current allocation of quotas is listed below.

=== Qualification summary ===
NOC	Boys	Girls	Total
Australia	0	1	1
Belgium	1	0	1
Bulgaria	0	1	1
Canada	1	1	2
China	1	2	3
France	1	0	1
Germany	1	1	2
Hungary	2	1	3
Italy	0	1	1
Japan	2	1	3
Kazakhstan	1	1	2
Latvia	1	0	1
Netherlands	1	1	2
Russia	1	2	3
South Korea	2	2	4
United States	1	1	2
Total athletes	16	16	32
Total NOCs	13	13	16
