= 2018–19 ISU Short Track Speed Skating World Cup =

International speed skating competition

- Dates: 2 November 2018 – 10 February 2019

The 2018–19 ISU Short Track Speed Skating World Cup was a multi-race tournament over a season for short track speed skating. The season began on 2 November 2018 in Canada and ended on 10 February 2019 in Italy. The World Cup was organised by the ISU who also runs world cups and championships in speed skating and figure skating.

The World Cup consisted of five competitions this year.

== Calendar ==
=== Men ===
==== Calgary 2–4 November 2018 ====
Date	Place	Distance	Winner	Second	Third	Reference
3 November 2018	Olympic Oval	500m (1)	(China) Wu Dajing	(Hungary) Shaoang Liu	(South Korea) Kim Gun-woo	
4 November 2018	Olympic Oval	500m (2)	(China) Wu Dajing	(Kazakhstan) Abzal Azhgaliev	(Hungary) Shaolin Sandor Liu	
4 November 2018	Olympic Oval	1000m	(Hungary) Shaoang Liu	(South Korea) Park Ji-won	(China) Ren Ziwei	
3 November 2018	Olympic Oval	1500m	(Japan) Kazuki Yoshinaga	(South Korea) Lee June-seo	(Israel) Vladislav Bykanov	
4 November 2018	Olympic Oval	5000m relay	Hungary	South Korea	Netherlands	

==== Salt Lake City 9–11 November 2018 ====
Date	Place	Distance	Winner	Second	Third	Reference
11 November 2018	Utah Olympic Oval	500m	(China) Wu Dajing	(South Korea) Lim Hyo-jun	(Hungary) Shaoang Liu	
10 November 2018	Utah Olympic Oval	1000m (1)	(Hungary) Shaolin Sandor Liu	(China) Ren Ziwei	(South Korea) Park Ji-won	
11 November 2018	Utah Olympic Oval	1000m (2)	(South Korea) Hong Kyung-hwan	(France) Thibaut Fauconnet	(Russia) Denis Ayrapetyan	
10 November 2018	Utah Olympic Oval	1500m	(Netherlands) Sjinkie Knegt	(South Korea) Lee June-seo	(Canada) Steven Dubois	
11 November 2018	Utah Olympic Oval	5000m relay	Hungary	China	Russia	

==== Almaty 7–9 December 2018 ====
Date	Place	Distance	Winner	Second	Third	Reference
9 December 2018	Halyk Arena	500m	(Canada) Samuel Girard	(Hungary) Shaoang Liu	(Kazakhstan) Abzal Azhgaliev	
8 December 2018	Halyk Arena	1000m	(Hungary) Shaoang Liu	(Netherlands) Sjinkie Knegt	(South Korea) Lee June-seo	
8 December 2018	Halyk Arena	1500m (1)	(South Korea) Lim Hyo-jun	(South Korea) Kim Gun-woo	(South Korea) Hwang Dae-heon	
9 December 2018	Halyk Arena	1500m (2)	(South Korea) Kim Gun-woo	(South Korea) Hong Kyung-hwan	(South Korea) Lee June-seo	
9 December 2018	Halyk Arena	5000m relay	Netherlands	Canada	China	

==== Dresden 1–3 February 2019 ====
Date	Place	Distance	Winner	Second	Third	Reference
3 February 2019	EnergieVerbund Arena	500m	(South Korea) Lim Hyo-jun	(South Korea) Hwang Dae-heon	(Canada) Cedrik Blais	
2 February 2019	EnergieVerbund Arena	1000m (1)	(South Korea) Hwang Dae-heon	(Canada) Charle Cournoyer	(South Korea) Hong Kyung-hwan	
3 February 2019	EnergieVerbund Arena	1000m (2)	(South Korea) Park Ji-won	(Israel) Vladislav Bykanov	(France) Sebastien Lepape	
2 February 2019	EnergieVerbund Arena	1500m	(South Korea) Kim Gun-woo	(Canada) Charles Hamelin	(South Korea) Lim Hyo-jun	
3 February 2019	EnergieVerbund Arena	5000m relay	Canada	Japan	Hungary	

==== Torino 8–10 February 2019 ====
Date	Place	Distance	Winner	Second	Third	Reference
9 February 2019	Tazzoli Ice Rink	500m (1)	(South Korea) Hwang Dae-heon	(Hungary) Shaolin Sandor Liu	(Canada) Cedrik Blais	
10 February 2019	Tazzoli Ice Rink	500m (2)	(South Korea) Lim Hyo-jun	(South Korea) Kim Gun-woo	(China) Yu Songnan	
10 February 2019	Tazzoli Ice Rink	1000m	(South Korea) Hwang Dae-heon	(South Korea) Park Ji-won	(Canada) Steven Dubois	
9 February 2019	Tazzoli Ice Rink	1500m	(South Korea) Kim Gun-woo	(South Korea) Hong Kyung-hwan	(Canada) Steven Dubois	
10 February 2019	Tazzoli Ice Rink	5000m relay	Russia	Japan	Italy	

=== Women ===
==== Calgary 2–4 November 2018 ====
Date	Place	Distance	Winner	Second	Third	Reference
3 November 2018	Olympic Oval	500m (1)	(Poland) Natalia Maliszewska	(Netherlands) Yara van Kerkhof	(Canada) Alyson Charles	
4 November 2018	Olympic Oval	500m (2)	(Netherlands) Lara van Ruijven	(China) Fan Kexin	(Canada) Alyson Charles	
4 November 2018	Olympic Oval	1000m	(Netherlands) Suzanne Schulting	(Russia) Sofia Prosvirnova	(France) Veronique Pierron	
3 November 2018	Olympic Oval	1500m	(Netherlands) Suzanne Schulting	(Canada) Courtney Lee Sarault	(Russia) Ekaterina Efremenkova	
4 November 2018	Olympic Oval	3000m relay	Russia	South Korea	Canada	

==== Salt Lake City 9–11 November 2018 ====
Date	Place	Distance	Winner	Second	Third	Reference
11 November 2018	Utah Olympic Oval	500m	(Poland) Natalia Maliszewska	(Netherlands) Suzanne Schulting	(China) Fan Kexin	
10 November 2018	Utah Olympic Oval	1000m (1)	(Netherlands) Suzanne Schulting	(Russia) Sofia Prosvirnova	(China) Fan Kexin	
11 November 2018	Utah Olympic Oval	1000m (2)	(Canada) Alyson Charles	(Germany) Anna Seidel	(South Korea) Noh Ah-reum	
10 November 2018	Utah Olympic Oval	1500m	(South Korea) Choi Min-jeong	(South Korea) Kim Ji-yoo	(China) Li Xuan	
11 November 2018	Utah Olympic Oval	3000m relay	South Korea	Russia	Japan	

==== Almaty 7–9 December 2018 ====
Date	Place	Distance	Winner	Second	Third	Reference
9 December 2018	Halyk Arena	500m	(Hungary) Petra Jaszapati	(Netherlands) Lara van Ruijven	(Poland) Natalia Maliszewska	
8 December 2018	Halyk Arena	1000m	(Netherlands) Suzanne Schulting	(Canada) Kim Boutin	(South Korea) Noh Ah-reum	
8 December 2018	Halyk Arena	1500m (1)	(South Korea) Kim Geon-hee	(Russia) Ekaterina Efremenkova	(China) Li Jinyu	
9 December 2018	Halyk Arena	1500m (2)	(South Korea) Choi Min-jeong	(Netherlands) Suzanne Schulting	(Canada) Kim Boutin	
9 December 2018	Halyk Arena	3000m relay	Netherlands	South Korea	Canada	

==== Dresden 1–3 February 2019 ====
Date	Place	Distance	Winner	Second	Third	Reference
3 February 2019	EnergieVerbund Arena	500m	(Italy) Martina Valcepina	(Netherlands) Lara van Ruijven	(Poland) Natalia Maliszewska	
2 February 2019	EnergieVerbund Arena	1000m (1)	(Russia) Sofia Prosvirnova	(South Korea) Choi Ji-hyun	(Italy) Cynthia Mascitto	
3 February 2019	EnergieVerbund Arena	1000m (2)	(Netherlands) Suzanne Schulting	(South Korea) Kim Ji-yoo	(China) Zhang Chutong	
2 February 2019	EnergieVerbund Arena	1500m	(South Korea) Kim Ji-yoo	(Canada) Kim Boutin	(Netherlands) Suzanne Schulting	
3 February 2019	EnergieVerbund Arena	3000m relay	Russia	Netherlands	Canada	

==== Torino 8–10 February 2019 ====
Date	Place	Distance	Winner	Second	Third	Reference
9 February 2019	Tazzoli Ice Rink	500m (1)	(Italy) Martina Valcepina	(Poland) Natalia Maliszewska	(Canada) Kim Boutin	
10 February 2019	Tazzoli Ice Rink	500m (2)	(Italy) Martina Valcepina	(United Kingdom) Elise Christie	(United States) Maame Biney	
10 February 2019	Tazzoli Ice Rink	1000m	(Canada) Kim Boutin	(South Korea) Choi Min-jeong	(Canada) Alyson Charles	
9 February 2019	Tazzoli Ice Rink	1500m	(Netherlands) Suzanne Schulting	(South Korea) Kim Ji-yoo	(Germany) Anna Seidel	
10 February 2019	Tazzoli Ice Rink	3000m relay	Netherlands	Italy	Russia	

=== Mixed ===
==== Calgary 2–4 November 2018 ====
Date	Place	Distance	Winner	Second	Third	Reference
4 November 2018	Olympic Oval	2000m relay	China	Netherlands	South Korea	

==== Salt Lake City 9–11 November 2018 ====
Date	Place	Distance	Winner	Second	Third	Reference
11 November 2018	Utah Olympic Oval	2000m relay	Hungary	Netherlands	France	

==== Almaty 7–9 December 2018 ====
Date	Place	Distance	Winner	Second	Third	Reference
9 December 2018	Halyk Arena	2000m relay	Canada	South Korea	China	

==== Dresden 1–3 February 2019 ====
Date	Place	Distance	Winner	Second	Third	Reference
3 February 2019	EnergieVerbund Arena	2000m relay	Russia	Hungary	(United Kingdom) Great Britain	

==== Torino 8–10 February 2019 ====
Date	Place	Distance	Winner	Second	Third	Reference
10 February 2019	Tazzoli Ice Rink	2000m relay	Russia	Canada	United States	

== World Cup standings ==
=== Men's 500 metres ===
Standings after 5 events

Pos	Athlete	Points
1.	Lim Hyo-jun (KOR)	31439
2.	Wu Dajing (CHN)	30000
3.	Samuel Girard (CAN)	26434
4.	Hwang Dae-heon (KOR)	23235
5.	Shaolin Sandor Liu (HUN)	22632

=== Women's 500 metres ===
Standings after 5 events

Pos	Athlete	Points
1.	Natalia Maliszewska (POL)	40800
2.	Martina Valcepina (ITA)	39216
3.	Lara van Ruijven (NED)	35216
4.	Yara van Kerkhof (NED)	20975
5.	Petra Jaszapati (HUN)	19306

=== Men's 1000 metres ===
Standings after 5 events

Pos	Athlete	Points
1.	Park Ji-won (KOR)	37520
2.	Hong Kyung-hwan (KOR)	24459
3.	Shaoang Liu (HUN)	23277
4.	Ren Ziwei (CHN)	20954
5.	Hwang Dae-heon (KOR)	20000

=== Women's 1000 metres ===
Standings after 5 events

Pos	Athlete	Points
1.	Suzanne Schulting (NED)	40000
2.	Sofia Prosvirnova (RUS)	29695
3.	Alyson Charles (CAN)	26640
4.	Veronique Pierron (FRA)	18105
5.	Kim Boutin (CAN)	18000

=== Men's 1500 metres ===
Standings after 5 events

Pos	Athlete	Points
1.	Kim Gun-woo (KOR)	38000
2.	Steven Dubois (CAN)	23040
3.	Lee June-seo (KOR)	22515
4.	Lim Hyo-jun (KOR)	19902
5.	Hong Kyung-hwan (KOR)	17074

=== Women's 1500 metres ===
Standings after 5 events

Pos	Athlete	Points
1.	Suzanne Schulting (NED)	34400
2.	Kim Ji-yoo (KOR)	29277
3.	Choi Min-jeong (KOR)	28192
4.	Ekaterina Efremenkova (RUS)	19118
5.	Li Jinyu (CHN)	15870

=== Men's 5000 metre relay ===
Standings after 5 events

Pos	Athlete	Points
1	Hungary	29677
2	Canada	26397
3	Japan	24192
4	Netherlands	23617
5	China	23616

=== Women's 3000 metre relay ===
Standings after 5 events

Pos	Athlete	Points
1	Russia	34400
2	Netherlands	33120
3	South Korea	32400
4	Canada	20541
5	Italy	15741

=== Mixed 2000 metre relay ===
Standings after 5 events

Pos	Athlete	Points
1	Russia	25898
2	China	25616
3	Canada	25373
4	Hungary	24717
5	South Korea	20862

== See also ==
- 2019 World Short Track Speed Skating Championships
