= Mixed-NOCs at the 2016 Winter Youth Olympics =

Mixed-NOCs participation at the Youth Olympic Games
Mixed-NOC teams participated under the Olympic flag

At the 2016 Winter Youth Olympics in Norway
Medals	Gold; 4	Silver; 4	Bronze; 5	Total; 13
- The first medal count above include those won at events where all participating teams were mixed-NOC teams, as well as those won at events where some teams were mixed-NOC and others single-NOC.
Medals	Gold; 0	Silver; 0	Bronze; 1	Total; 1
- The second medal count above only includes medals won by mixed-NOC teams at events where there were also teams representing individual NOCs.

Teams made up of athletes representing different National Olympic Committees (NOCs), called mixed-NOCs teams, participated in the 2016 Winter Youth Olympics. These teams participated in either events composed entirely of mixed-NOCs teams, or in events which saw the participation of mixed-NOCs teams and non-mixed-NOCs teams. When a mixed-NOCs team won a medal, the Olympic flag was raised rather than a national flag; if a mixed-NOCs team won gold, the Olympic anthem would be played instead of national anthems. A total of 6 events with Mixed NOCs were held.

== Background ==
The concept of mixed-NOCs was introduced in the 2010 Summer Youth Olympics, in which athletes from different nations would compete in the same team, often representing their continent. This is in contrast to the Mixed team (IOC code: ZZX) found at early senior Olympic Games.

== Medal summary ==
The following medal summary lists all nations whose athletes won a medal while competing for a mixed-NOCs team. If there is more than one athlete from the same nation on a medal-winning team, only one medal of that colour is credited. The summary shows how many events at which a nation had an athlete in a medal-winning mixed-NOCs team.

A total of 25 National Olympic Committees, had at least one athlete representing a mixed-NOCs team win a medal.

Mixed-NOCs medals — summary by athletes' nations

Rank	Nation	Gold	Silver	Bronze	Total
1	China	2	1	2	5
2	South Korea	2	0	0	2
3	Japan	1	1	1	3
4	France	1	1	0	2
4	United States	1	1	0	2
6	Norway	1	0	2	3
7	Italy	1	0	1	2
8	Belgium	1	0	0	1
8	Mongolia	1	0	0	1
8	Russia	1	0	0	1
8	Switzerland	1	0	0	1
12	Netherlands	0	2	0	2
13	Latvia	0	1	2	3
14	Hungary	0	1	1	2
14	Kazakhstan	0	1	1	2
14	Ukraine	0	1	1	2
17	Australia	0	1	0	1
17	Czech Republic	0	1	0	1
17	Great Britain	0	1	0	1
17	Poland	0	1	0	1
21	Bulgaria	0	0	2	2
22	Canada	0	0	1	1
22	Germany	0	0	1	1
22	Romania	0	0	1	1
22	Sweden	0	0	1	1
Totals (25 entries)		13	14	17	44

== Curling ==
Athletes from the mixed team event were paired off to form a doubles team containing one boy and one girl. In total 32 mixed NOCs teams were formed.

Games	Gold	Silver	Bronze
Mixed doubles	Yako Matsuzawa (JPN); Philipp Hösli (SUI)	Han Yu (CHN); Ross Whyte (GBR)	Zhao Ruiyi (CHN); Andreas Hårstad (NOR)

== Figure skating ==
Athletes from the four figure skating events were placed to form a team trophy containing one boy, one girl, one pair and one ice dancing. In total 8 mixed NOCs teams were formed.

Discipline	Gold	Silver	Bronze
Mixed NOC team	Team Desire; Dmitri Aliev (RUS); Li Xiangning (CHN); Sarah Rose / Joseph Goodpaster (USA); Anastasia Skoptcova / Kirill Aleshin (RUS)	Team Future; Ivan Shmuratko (UKR); Diāna Ņikitina (LAT); Anna Dušková / Martin Bidař (CZE); Julia Wagret / Mathieu Couyras (FRA)	Team Discovery; Deniss Vasiļjevs (LAT); Fruzsina Medgyesi (HUN); Gao Yumeng / Li Bowen (CHN); Marjorie Lajoie / Zachary Lagha (CAN)

== Luge ==
Athletes from the three individual sled events were placed to form a team containing one boy, one girl and one doubles sled. Nations without a full team were able to form mixed NOCs teams. In total 1 mixed NOCs team was formed.

Events	Gold		Silver		Bronze	
Mixed team relay	Won by a team representing the individual NOC of Germany	2:52.520	Won by a team representing the individual NOC of Russia	2:52.708	Won by a team representing the individual NOC of Italy	2:53.040

== Short track speed skating ==
Athletes from the individual events were placed to form a team containing two boys and two girls. In total 8 mixed NOCs teams were formed.

Event	Gold		Silver		Bronze	
Mixed NOC Team Relay	Team B Ane Farstad (NOR); Kim Ji-yoo (KOR); Stijn Desmet (BEL); Quentin Fercoq (FRA)	4:14.413	Team C Petra Jaszapati (HUN); Julia Moore (AUS); Tjerk de Boer (NED); Kiichi Shigehiro (JPN)	4:14.495	Team F Katrin Manoilova (BUL); Anita Nagay (KAZ); Karlis Kruzbergs (LAT); Kazuki Yoshinaga (JPN)	4:17.181

== Snowboarding ==
Athletes which participated in the ski and snowboard cross were placed to form a team containing one snowboard cross girl, one ski cross girl, one snowboard cross boy and one ski cross boy. Nations without a full team were able to form mixed NOCs teams. In total 5 mixed NOCs teams were formed.

Event	Gold	Silver	Bronze
Team snowboard ski cross	Won by a team representing the individual NOC of Germany	Won by a team representing the individual NOC of Switzerland	Team 4 Daryna Kyrychenko (UKR); Veronica Edebo (SWE); Valentin Miladinov (BUL); David Mobaerg (SWE)

== Speed skating ==
Athletes from the individual events were placed to form a team containing two boys and two girls. In total 13 mixed NOCs teams were formed.

Event	Gold		Silver		Bronze	
Team sprint	Team 6 Noemi Bonazza (ITA); Sumiya Buyantogtokh (MGL); Chung Jae-woong (KOR); Shen Nanyang (CHN)	1:57.85	Team 9 Elisa Dul (NED); Karolina Gasecka (POL); Austin Kleba (USA); Anvar Mukhamadeyev (KAZ)	1:58.80	Team 10; Chiara Cristelli (ITA); Mihaela Hogas (ROU); Ole Jeske (GER); Allan Dahl Johansson (NOR)	1:58.87

== See also ==
- 2016 Winter Youth Olympics medal table
- Mixed-NOCs at the Youth Olympics
