= Cross-country skiing at the 2016 Winter Youth Olympics – Boys' sprint =

Boys' sprint at the II Winter Youth Olympic Games
- Venue: Birkebeineren Ski Stadium
- Date: 16 February
- Competitors: 48 from 40 nations

Medalists
1st place, gold medalist(s)		Thomas Helland Larsen	Norway
2nd place, silver medalist(s)		Kim Magnus	South Korea
3rd place, bronze medalist(s)		Vebjørn Hegdal	Norway

The boys' sprint classical cross-country skiing competition at the 2016 Winter Youth Olympics was held on 16 February at the Birkebeineren Ski Stadium. The sprint distance was 1.3km.

== Results ==
=== Qualifying ===
Rank	Bib	Athlete	Country	Time	Deficit	Note
1	2	Lauri Mannila	Finland	2:56.12	–	Q
2	8	Thomas Helland Larsen	Norway	2:56.89	+0.77	Q
3	4	Kim Magnus	South Korea	2:57.16	+1.04	Q
4	3	Adam Persson	Sweden	2:58.36	+2.24	Q
5	6	Camille Laude	France	2:58.50	+2.38	Q
6	7	Vebjørn Hegdal	Norway	2:59.75	+3.63	Q
7	27	Vili Črv	Slovenia	3:03.55	+7.43	Q
8	1	Ivan Lyuft	Kazakhstan	3:03.63	+7.51	Q
9	32	Adam Matouš	Czech Republic	3:04.51	+8.39	Q
10	9	Igor Fedotov	Russia	3:05.58	+9.46	Q
11	24	Chris Ole Sauerbrey	Germany	3:06.03	+9.91	Q
12	22	Raimo Vīgants	Latvia	3:06.42	+10.30	Q
13	35	Luka Markun	Slovenia	3:07.38	+11.26	Q
14	23	Kaarel Karri	Estonia	3:07.51	+11.39	Q
15	20	Remi Lindholm	Finland	3:07.56	+11.44	Q
16	13	Andrii Orlyk	Ukraine	3:07.83	+11.71	Q
17	19	Luca Del Fabbro	Italy	3:08.01	+11.89	Q
18	10	Philipp Unger	Germany	3:08.37	+12.25	Q
19	11	Eric Rosjö	Sweden	3:08.51	+12.39	Q
20	18	Arnaud Guex	Switzerland	3:08.57	+12.45	Q
21	14	Mateusz Haratyk	Poland	3:08.99	+12.87	Q
22	5	Yaroslav Rybochkin	Russia	3:10.09	+13.97	Q
23	43	Tsimur Laskin	Belarus	3:10.42	+14.30	Q
24	25	Jan Mikus	Slovakia	3:11.27	+15.15	Q
25	29	Nikolay Viyachev	Bulgaria	3:12.15	+16.03	Q
26	12	Jeremy Royer	France	3:12.51	+16.39	Q
27	47	Florian Schwentner	Austria	3:12.58	+16.46	Q
28	17	Maurus Lozza	Switzerland	3:13.13	+17.01	Q
29	16	Hunter Wonders	United States	3:13.15	+17.03	Q
30	30	Riku Kasahara	Japan	3:14.45	+18.33	Q
31	26	Rokas Vaitkus	Lithuania	3:14.99	+18.87	
32	41	Herman Borring Valset	Denmark	3:15.09	+18.97	
33	21	Levi Nadlersmith	Canada	3:15.19	+19.07	
34	15	Thibaut De Marre	Belgium	3:15.32	+19.20	
35	28	Mikayel Mikayelyan	Armenia	3:16.38	+20.26	
36	39	Dagur Benediktsson	Iceland	3:19.32	+23.20	
37	38	Jakov Hladika	Croatia	3:21.12	+25.00	
38	33	Gral Sellés	Spain	3:21.26	+25.14	
39	37	Iulian Ababei	Romania	3:26.46	+30.34	
40	34	Máté János Gyallai	Hungary	3:26.88	+30.76	
41	42	Liam Burton	Australia	3:30.25	+34.13	
42	31	Marco Dal Farra	Argentina	3:33.20	+37.08	
43	45	Ochirsukh Adiyabaatar	Mongolia	3:33.53	+37.41	
44	48	Stavre Jada	Macedonia	3:35.43	+39.31	
45	40	Amed Oğlağo	Turkey	3:45.22	+49.10	
46	36	Miloš Čolić	Bosnia and Herzegovina	3:47.93	+51.81	
47	46	Cristian Bocancea	Moldova	3:48.01	+51.89	
48	44	Altair Firmino	Brazil	3:48.45	+52.33	

=== Quarterfinals ===
Quarterfinal 1

Rank	Seed	Athlete	Country	Time	Deficit	Note
1	1	Lauri Mannila	Finland	3:01.70	—	Q
2	10	Igor Fedotov	Russia	3:02.68	+0.98	Q
3	11	Chris Ole Sauerbrey	Germany	3:04.32	+2.62	
4	20	Arnaud Guex	Switzerland	3:04.87	+3.17	
5	21	Mateusz Haratyk	Poland	3:09.45	+7.75	
6	30	Riku Kasahara	Japan	3:15.13	+13.43	

Quarterfinal 2

Rank	Seed	Athlete	Country	Time	Deficit	Note
1	4	Adam Persson	Sweden	3:00.51	—	Q
2	7	Vili Črv	Slovenia	3:02.25	+1.74	Q
3	17	Luca Del Fabbro	Italy	3:02.91	+2.40	LL
4	14	Kaarel Karri	Estonia	3:03.67	+3.16	
5	27	Florian Schwentner	Austria	3:06.84	+6.33	
6	24	Jan Mikus	Slovakia	3:15.69	+15.18	

Quarterfinal 3

Rank	Seed	Athlete	Country	Time	Deficit	Note
1	6	Vebjørn Hegdal	Norway	2:57.95	—	Q
2	5	Camille Laude	France	2:59.04	+1.09	Q
3	15	Remi Lindholm	Finland	3:02.32	+4.37	LL
4	16	Andrii Orlyk	Ukraine	3:03.63	+5.68	
5	25	Nikolay Viyachev	Bulgaria	3:18.37	+20.42	
6	26	Jeremy Royer	France	3:29.6	+31.67	

Quarterfinal 4

Rank	Seed	Athlete	Country	Time	Deficit	Note
1	2	Thomas Helland Larsen	Norway	3:04.54	—	Q
2	9	Adam Matouš	Czech Republic	3:04.65	+0.11	Q, PF
3	29	Hunter Wonders	United States	3:04.65	+0.11	PF
4	19	Eric Rosjö	Sweden	3:11.75	+7.21	
5	12	Raimo Vīgants	Latvia	3:13.50	+8.96	
6	22	Yaroslav Rybochkin	Russia	3:23.76	+19.22	

Quarterfinal 5

Rank	Seed	Athlete	Country	Time	Deficit	Note
1	3	Kim Magnus	South Korea	3:02.34	—	Q
2	8	Ivan Lyuft	Kazakhstan	3:03.10	+0.76	Q
3	18	Philipp Unger	Germany	3:07.80	+5.46	
4	23	Tsimur Laskin	Belarus	3:09.11	+6.77	
5	13	Luka Markun	Slovenia	3:10.42	+8.08	
6	28	Maurus Lozza	Switzerland	3:37.61	+35.27	

=== Semifinals ===
Semifinal 1

Rank	Seed	Athlete	Country	Time	Deficit	Note
1	6	Vebjørn Hegdal	Norway	2:55.59	—	Q, PF
2	4	Adam Persson	Sweden	2:55.59	+0.00	Q, PF
3	1	Lauri Mannila	Finland	2:55.79	+0.20	LL, PF
4	10	Igor Fedotov	Russia	2:59.85	+4.26	
5	7	Vili Črv	Slovenia	3:00.06	+4.47	
6	17	Luca Del Fabbro	Italy	3:24.85	+29.26	

Semifinal 2

Rank	Seed	Athlete	Country	Time	Deficit	Note
1	3	Kim Magnus	South Korea	2:57.19	—	Q
2	2	Thomas Helland Larsen	Norway	2:57.63	+0.44	Q
3	5	Camille Laude	France	2:57.85	+0.66	LL
4	8	Ivan Lyuft	Kazakhstan	2:58.07	+0.88	
5	15	Remi Lindholm	Finland	3:03.08	+5.89	
6	9	Adam Matouš	Czech Republic	3:05.04	+7.85	

=== Final ===
Rank	Seed	Athlete	Country	Time	Deficit	Note
1st place, gold medalist(s)	2	Thomas Helland Larsen	Norway	2:55.39	—	
2nd place, silver medalist(s)	3	Kim Magnus	South Korea	2:55.72	+0.33	
3rd place, bronze medalist(s)	6	Vebjørn Hegdal	Norway	2:56.49	+1.10	
4	5	Camille Laude	France	2:59.87	+4.48	
5	1	Lauri Mannila	Finland	3:00.96	+5.57	
6	4	Adam Persson	Sweden	3:16.58	+21.19	
