= Cross-country skiing at the 2016 Winter Youth Olympics – Boys' cross-country cross =

Boys' cross-country cross at the II Winter Youth Olympic Games
- Venue: Birkebeineren Ski Stadium
- Date: 13 February
- Competitors: 50 from 42 nations

Medalists
1st place, gold medalist(s)		Kim Magnus	South Korea
2nd place, silver medalist(s)		Thomas Helland Larsen	Norway
3rd place, bronze medalist(s)		Lauri Mannila	Finland

The boys' cross-country cross freestyle cross-country skiing competition at the 2016 Winter Youth Olympics was held on 13 February at the Birkebeineren Ski Stadium. The distance was 1.5km.

== Results ==
=== Qualifying ===
The qualifying was held at 10:00.

Rank	Bib	Athlete	Country	Time	Deficit	Note
1	4	Kim Magnus	South Korea	3:01.45	–	Q
2	6	Camille Laude	France	3:04.33	+2.88	Q
3	8	Thomas Helland Larsen	Norway	3:05.67	+4.22	Q
4	7	Vebjørn Hegdal	Norway	3:05.96	+4.51	Q
5	2	Lauri Mannila	Finland	3:06.26	+4.81	Q
6	3	Adam Persson	Sweden	3:07.93	+6.48	Q
7	20	Remi Lindholm	Finland	3:11.06	+9.61	Q
8	27	Vili Črv	Slovenia	3:11.46	+10.01	Q
9	18	Arnaud Guex	Switzerland	3:11.70	+10.25	Q
10	1	Ivan Lyuft	Kazakhstan	3:12.36	+10.91	Q
11	49	Florian Schwentner	Austria	3:12.81	+11.36	Q
12	19	Luca Del Fabbro	Italy	3:13.08	+11.63	Q
13	22	Raimo Vīgants	Latvia	3:13.32	+11.87	Q
14	24	Chris Ole Sauerbrey	Germany	3:14.51	+13.06	Q
15	13	Andrii Orlyk	Ukraine	3:14.56	+13.11	Q
16	12	Jeremy Royer	France	3:15.52	+14.07	Q
17	10	Philipp Unger	Germany	3:15.79	+14.34	Q
18	32	Adam Matouš	Czech Republic	3:16.02	+14.57	Q
19	17	Maurus Lozza	Switzerland	3:16.62	+15.17	Q
20	11	Eric Rosjö	Sweden	3:16.66	+15.21	Q
21	26	Rokas Vaitkus	Lithuania	3:16.71	+15.26	Q
22	23	Kaarel Karri	Estonia	3:16.73	+15.28	Q
23	30	Riku Kasahara	Japan	3:16.92	+15.47	Q
24	14	Mateusz Haratyk	Poland	3:17.05	+15.60	Q
25	36	Luka Markun	Slovenia	3:17.46	+16.01	Q
26	29	Nikolay Viyachev	Bulgaria	3:17.98	+16.53	Q
27	28	Mikayel Mikayelyan	Armenia	3:18.48	+17.03	Q
28	5	Yaroslav Rybochkin	Russia	3:18.82	+17.37	Q
29	21	Levi Nadlersmith	Canada	3:19.14	+17.69	Q
30	16	Hunter Wonders	United States	3:19.42	+17.97	Q
31	15	Thibaut De Marre	Belgium	3:19.67	+18.22	
32	34	Gral Sellés	Spain	3:21.47	+20.02	
33	44	Tsimur Laskin	Belarus	3:22.18	+20.73	
34	9	Igor Fedotov	Russia	3:23.58	+22.13	
35	25	Jan Mikuš	Slovakia	3:25.72	+24.27	
36	31	Marco Dal Farra	Argentina	3:27.85	+26.40	
37	37	Miloš Čolić	Bosnia and Herzegovina	3:30.11	+28.66	
38	43	Liam Burton	Australia	3:34.35	+32.90	
39	47	Cristian Bocancea	Moldova	3:34.37	+32.92	
40	33	Nikolaos Tsourekas	Greece	3:36.17	+34.72	
41	38	Iulian Ababei	Romania	3:36.48	+35.03	
42	40	Dagur Benediktsson	Iceland	3:37.17	+35.72	
43	50	Stavre Jada	Macedonia	3:39.99	+38.54	
44	45	Altair Firmino	Brazil	3:40.44	+38.99	
45	35	Máté János Gyallai	Hungary	3:40.97	+39.52	
46	42	Herman Borring Valset	Denmark	3:41.52	+40.07	
47	39	Jakov Hladika	Croatia	3:41.87	+40.42	
48	46	Ochirsukh Adiyabaatar	Mongolia	3:43.82	+42.37	
49	41	Amed Oğlağo	Turkey	3:44.75	+43.30	
50	48	Elías González	Chile	4:27.48	+1:26.03	

=== Semifinals ===
Semifinal 1

Rank	Seed	Athlete	Country	Time	Deficit	Note
1	1	Kim Magnus	South Korea	3:05.14	–	Q
2	6	Adam Persson	Sweden	3:06.88	+1.74	Q
3	12	Luca Del Fabbro	Italy	3:08.12	+2.98	LL
4	7	Remi Lindholm	Finland	3:08.23	+3.09	LL
5	24	Mateusz Haratyk	Poland	3:10.38	+5.24	LL
6	19	Maurus Lozza	Switzerland	3:10.46	+5.32	
7	13	Raimo Vīgants	Latvia	3:11.43	+6.29	
8	18	Adam Matouš	Czech Republic	3:11.90	+6.76	
9	30	Hunter Wonders	United States	3:12.18	+7.04	
10	25	Luka Markun	Slovenia	3:14.01	+8.87	

Semifinal 2

Rank	Seed	Athlete	Country	Time	Deficit	Note
1	2	Camille Laude	France	3:05.84	–	Q
2	5	Lauri Mannila	Finland	3:08.33	+2.49	Q
3	11	Florian Schwentner	Austria	3:09.24	+3.40	LL
4	8	Vili Črv	Slovenia	3:12.13	+6.29	
5	14	Chris Ole Sauerbrey	Germany	3:14.30	+8.46	
6	17	Philipp Unger	Germany	3:15.97	+10.13	
7	23	Riku Kasahara	Japan	3:16.44	+10.60	
8	26	Nikolay Viyachev	Bulgaria	3:17.30	+11.46	
9	29	Levi Nadlersmith	Canada	3:22.35	+16.51	
10	20	Eric Rosjö	Sweden	3:24.19	+18.35	

Semifinal 3

Rank	Seed	Athlete	Country	Time	Deficit	Note
1	3	Thomas Helland Larsen	Norway	3:02.35	–	Q
2	10	Ivan Lyuft	Kazakhstan	3:06.96	+4.61	Q
3	9	Arnaud Guex	Switzerland	3:11.18	+8.83	
4	28	Yaroslav Rybochkin	Russia	3:11.87	+9.52	
5	15	Andrii Orlyk	Ukraine	3:12.21	+9.86	
6	16	Jeremy Royer	France	3:12.25	+9.90	
7	4	Vebjørn Hegdal	Norway	3:13.21	+10.86	
8	22	Kaarel Karri	Estonia	3:14.44	+12.09	
9	27	Mikayel Mikayelyan	Armenia	3:14.65	+12.30	
10	21	Rokas Vaitkus	Lithuania	3:20.93	+18.58	

=== Final ===
The final was held at 12:07.

Rank	Seed	Athlete	Country	Time	Deficit	Note
1st place, gold medalist(s)	1	Kim Magnus	South Korea	2:59.56	–	
2nd place, silver medalist(s)	3	Thomas Helland Larsen	Norway	3:00.73	+1.17	
3rd place, bronze medalist(s)	5	Lauri Mannila	Finland	3:01.84	+2.28	
4	6	Adam Persson	Sweden	3:03.95	+4.39	
5	12	Luca Del Fabbro	Italy	3:06.23	+6.67	
6	2	Camille Laude	France	3:06.97	+7.41	
7	7	Remi Lindholm	Finland	3:07.88	+8.32	
8	10	Ivan Lyuft	Kazakhstan	3:08.99	+9.43	
9	11	Florian Schwentner	Austria	3:16.48	+16.92	
10	24	Mateusz Haratyk	Poland	3:20.90	+21.34	
