= Short-track speed skating at the 2016 Winter Youth Olympics – Mixed team relay =

Mixed team relay at the II Winter Youth Olympic Games
- Venue: Gjøvik Olympic Cavern Hall
- Dates: 20 February
- Competitors: 32
- Teams: 16
- Winning time: 4:14.413

Medalists
1st place, gold medalist(s)		Ane Farstad; Kim Ji-yoo; Stijn Desmet; Quentin Fercoq	Mixed-NOCs
2nd place, silver medalist(s)		Petra Jászapáti; Julia Moore; Tjerk de Boer; Kiichi Shigehiro	Mixed-NOCs
3rd place, bronze medalist(s)		Katrin Manoilova; Anita Nagay; Kārlis Krūzbergs; Kazuki Yoshinaga	Mixed-NOCs

The mixed team relay in short track speed skating at the 2016 Winter Youth Olympics was held on 20 February at the Gjøvik Olympic Cavern Hall.

== Results ==
QA – qualified for Final A
QB – qualified for Final B
PEN – penalty

=== Semifinals ===
Rank	Semifinal	Team	Athletes	Time	Notes
1	1	Team 3	Petra Jászapáti (HUN); Julia Moore (AUS); Tjerk de Boer (NED); Kiichi Shigehiro (JPN)	4:15.332	QA
2	1	Team 5	Gloria Ioriatti (ITA); Anna Seidel (GER); Aaron Heo (USA); Hong Kyung-hwan (KOR)	4:16.056	QA
3	1	Team 8	Shione Kaminaga (JPN); Gioya Lancee (NED); Moritz Kreuseler (GER); Ma Wei (CHN)	4:27.607	QB
	1	Team 4	Gong Li (CHN); Lee Su-youn (KOR); Shaoang Liu (HUN); Yerkebulan Shamukhanov (KAZ)		PEN
1	2	Team 6	Katrin Manoilova (BUL); Anita Nagay (KAZ); Kārlis Krūzbergs (LAT); Kazuki Yoshinaga (JPN)	4:15.669	QA
2	2	Team 2	Ane Farstad (NOR); Kim Ji-yoo (KOR); Stijn Desmet (BEL); Quentin Fercoq (FRA)	4:16.206	QA
3	1	Team 1	April Shin (USA); Zang Yize (CHN); Pavel Sitnikov (RUS); András Sziklási (HUN)	4:18.683	QB
4	2	Team 7	Yelizaveta Kuznetsova (RUS); Angelina Tarasova (RUS); Martinius Elvebakken (NOR); Hwang Dae-heon (KOR)	4:20.469	QB

=== Final B ===
Rank	Team	Athletes	Time	Notes
4	Team 8	Shione Kaminaga (JPN); Gioya Lancee (NED); Moritz Kreuseler (GER); Ma Wei (CHN)	4:22.198	
5	Team 7	Yelizaveta Kuznetsova (RUS); Angelina Tarasova (RUS); Martinius Elvebakken (NOR); Hwang Dae-heon (KOR)	4:23.553	
6	Team 1	April Shin (USA); Zang Yize (CHN); Pavel Sitnikov (RUS); András Sziklási (HUN)	4:25.169	

=== Final A ===
Rank	Team	Athletes	Time	Notes
1st place, gold medalist(s)	Team 2	Ane Farstad (NOR); Kim Ji-yoo (KOR); Stijn Desmet (BEL); Quentin Fercoq (FRA)	4:14.413	
2nd place, silver medalist(s)	Team 3	Petra Jászapáti (HUN); Julia Moore (AUS); Tjerk de Boer (NED); Kiichi Shigehiro (JPN)	4:14.495	
3rd place, bronze medalist(s)	Team 6	Katrin Manoilova (BUL); Anita Nagay (KAZ); Kārlis Krūzbergs (LAT); Kazuki Yoshinaga (JPN)	4:17.181	
	Team 5	Gloria Ioriatti (ITA); Anna Seidel (GER); Aaron Heo (USA); Hong Kyung-hwan (KOR)		PEN
