= Cross-country skiing at the 2016 Winter Youth Olympics – Boys' 10 kilometre freestyle =

Boys' 10 kilometre freestyle at the II Winter Youth Olympic Games
- Venue: Birkebeineren Ski Stadium
- Date: 18 February
- Competitors: 50 from 42 nations
- Winning time: 23:04.8

Medalists
1st place, gold medalist(s)		Kim Magnus	South Korea
2nd place, silver medalist(s)		Vebjørn Hegdal	Norway
3rd place, bronze medalist(s)		Igor Fedotov	Russia

The boys' 10 kilometre freestyle cross-country skiing competition at the 2016 Winter Youth Olympics was held on 18 February at the Birkebeineren Ski Stadium.

== Results ==
The race was started at 12:00.

Rank	Bib	Name	Country	Time	Deficit
1st place, gold medalist(s)	41	Kim Magnus	South Korea	23:04.8	–
2nd place, silver medalist(s)	50	Vebjørn Hegdal	Norway	23:20.8	+16.0
3rd place, bronze medalist(s)	44	Igor Fedotov	Russia	23:59.2	+54.4
4	45	Thomas Helland Larsen	Norway	24:03.6	+58.8
5	46	Andrii Orlyk	Ukraine	24:13.4	+1:08.6
6	42	Yaroslav Rybochkin	Russia	24:17.1	+1:12.3
7	35	Remi Lindholm	Finland	24:48.3	+1:43.5
8	33	Hunter Wonders	United States	24:48.5	+1:43.7
9	34	Eric Rosjö	Sweden	25:15.0	+2:10.2
10	37	Luca Del Fabbro	Italy	25:20.5	+2:15.7
11	49	Ivan Lyuft	Kazakhstan	25:20.8	+2:16.0
12	38	Lauri Mannila	Finland	25:27.7	+2:22.9
13	43	Jeremy Royer	France	25:32.2	+2:27.4
14	23	Adam Matouš	Czech Republic	25:33.1	+2:28.3
15	20	Riku Kasahara	Japan	25:34.1	+2:29.3
16	32	Luka Markun	Slovenia	25:34.2	+2:29.4
17	25	Philipp Unger	Germany	25:35.1	+2:30.3
18	47	Maurus Lozza	Switzerland	25:36.2	+2:31.4
19	14	Tsimur Laskin	Belarus	25:40.3	+2:35.5
20	31	Mateusz Haratyk	Poland	25:45.3	+2:40.5
21	39	Adam Persson	Sweden	25:46.0	+2:41.2
22	40	Florian Schwentner	Austria	25:56.2	+2:51.4
23	48	Camille Laude	France	25:58.9	+2:54.1
24	22	Chris Ole Sauerbrey	Germany	25:59.3	+2:54.5
25	12	Thibaut De Marre	Belgium	26:10.2	+3:05.4
26	28	Mikayel Mikayelyan	Armenia	26:12.1	+3:07.3
27	11	Liam Burton	Australia	26:13.8	+3:09.0
28	27	Levi Nadlersmith	Canada	26:18.6	+3:13.8
29	29	Kaarel Karri	Estonia	26:19.6	+3:14.8
30	18	Vili Črv	Slovenia	26:23.3	+3:18.5
31	30	Raimo Vīgants	Latvia	26:35.9	+3:31.1
32	21	Rokas Vaitkus	Lithuania	26:37.4	+3:32.6
33	26	Amed Oğlağo	Turkey	26:44.4	+3:39.6
34	16	Stavre Jada	Macedonia	26:46.4	+3:41.6
35	19	Miloš Čolić	Bosnia and Herzegovina	26:48.2	+3:43.4
36	24	Nikolay Viyachev	Bulgaria	27:21.8	+4:17.0
37	7	Gral Sellés	Spain	27:32.8	+4:28.0
38	13	Nikolaos Tsourekas	Greece	27:47.5	+4:42.7
39	2	Cristian Bocancea	Moldova	27:49.7	+4:44.9
40	17	Jan Mikus	Slovakia	27:57.1	+4:52.3
41	5	Ochirsukh Adiyabaatar	Mongolia	28:07.5	+5:02.7
42	8	Iulian Ababei	Romania	28:13.3	+5:08.5
43	6	Dagur Benediktsson	Iceland	28:14.2	+5:09.4
44	15	Marco Dal Farra	Argentina	28:19.3	+5:14.5
45	4	Herman Borring Valset	Denmark	28:25.0	+5:20.2
46	10	Jakov Hladika	Croatia	29:24.7	+6:19.9
47	9	Altair Firmino	Brazil	29:54.7	+6:49.9
48	3	Máté János Gyallai	Hungary	30:14.8	+7:10.0
49	1	Elias González	Chile	35:13.7	+12:08.9
	36	Arnaud Guex	Switzerland	DNS	
