= Short-track speed skating at the 2016 Winter Youth Olympics – Girls' 1000 metres =

Girls' 1000 metres at the II Winter Youth Olympic Games
- Venue: Gjøvik Olympic Cavern Hall
- Dates: 14 February
- Competitors: 15 from 12 nations
- Winning time: 1:34.041

Medalists
1st place, gold medalist(s)		Kim Ji-yoo	South Korea
2nd place, silver medalist(s)		Lee Su-youn	South Korea
3rd place, bronze medalist(s)		Anna Seidel	Germany

The girls' 1000 metres in short track speed skating at the 2016 Winter Youth Olympics was held on 14 February at the Gjøvik Olympic Cavern Hall.

== Results ==
QAB – qualified for the semifinals A/B
QC – qualified for Final C
PEN – penalty
ADA – advanced

=== Quarterfinals ===
Rank	Heat	Name	Country	Time	Notes
1	1	Kim Ji-yoo	South Korea	1:40.773	QAB
2	1	Zang Yize	China	1:40.834	QAB
3	1	Shione Kaminaga	Japan	1:41.026	QC
1	2	Gioya Lancee	Netherlands	1:41.119	QAB
2	2	Anita Nagay	Kazakhstan	1:41.290	QAB
3	2	Gloria Ioriatti	Italy	1:43.603	QAB, ADV
	2	Angelina Tarasova	Russia		PEN
1	3	Anna Seidel	Germany	1:36.200	QAB
2	3	Yelizaveta Kuznetsova	Russia	1:47.402	QAB
3	3	Ane Farstad	Norway	1:50.565	QC
	3	Katrin Manoilova	Bulgaria		PEN
1	4	Lee Su-youn	South Korea	1:37.417	QAB
2	4	Petra Jászapáti	Hungary	1:37.636	QAB
3	4	Gong Li	China	1:37.783	QC
4	4	Julia Moore	Australia	1:45.694	QC

=== Semifinals ===
==== Semifinals A/B ====
QA – qualified for Final A
QB – qualified for Final B

Rank	Heat	Name	Country	Time	Notes
1	1	Kim Ji-yoo	South Korea	1:35.442	QA
2	1	Lee Su-youn	South Korea	1:35.583	QA
3	1	Zang Yize	China	1:36.550	QB
4	1	Anita Nagay	Kazakhstan	1:40.894	QB
1	2	Anna Seidel	Germany	1:36.344	QA
2	2	Petra Jászapáti	Hungary	1:36.385	QA
3	2	Yelizaveta Kuznetsova	Russia	1:37.689	QB
4	2	Gioya Lancee	Netherlands	1:37.857	QB
5	2	Gloria Ioriatti	Italy	1:39.573	QB

=== Finals ===
==== Final C ====
Rank	Name	Country	Time	Notes
10	Gong Li	China	1:35.789	
11	Shione Kaminaga	Japan	1:35.903	
12	Julia Moore	Australia	1:40.993	
13	Ane Farstad	Norway	1:41.666	

==== Final B ====
Rank	Name	Country	Time	Notes
5	Zang Yize	China	1:41.596	
6	Gioya Lancee	Netherlands	1:42.289	
7	Yelizaveta Kuznetsova	Russia	1:42.378	
8	Gloria Ioriatti	Italy	1:42.581	
9	Anita Nagay	Kazakhstan	1:42.693	

==== Final A ====
Rank	Name	Country	Time	Notes
1st place, gold medalist(s)	Kim Ji-yoo	South Korea	1:34.041	
2nd place, silver medalist(s)	Lee Su-youn	South Korea	1:34.118	
3rd place, bronze medalist(s)	Anna Seidel	Germany	1:34.323	
4	Petra Jászapáti	Hungary	1:34.431	
