= Haratyk =

Haratyk is a Polish surname prominent in the region of Silesia. Notable people with the surname include:

- Mateusz Haratyk (born 1999), Polish cross-country skier
- Michał Haratyk (born 1992), Polish athlete
