= South Korea at the 2016 Winter Youth Olympics =

- IOC code: KOR
- NOC: Korean Olympic Committee
- Website: www.sports.or.kr

in Lillehammer
- Competitors: 30 in 12 sports
- Medals Ranked 2nd: Gold 10 Silver 3 Bronze 3 Total 16

Winter Youth Olympics appearances (overview)
- 2012; 2016; 2020; 2024

South Korea competed at the 2016 Winter Youth Olympics in Lillehammer, Norway from 12 to 21 February 2016.

== Medalists ==
Medal	Name	Sport	Event	Date
Gold	Kim Magnus	Cross-country skiing	Boys' cross-country cross	13 February
Gold	Kim Min-sun	Speed skating	Girls' 500 m	13 February
Gold	Kim Ji-yoo	Short track	Girls' 1000 m	14 February
Gold	Hwang Dae-heon	Short track	Boys' 1000 m	14 February
Gold	Park Ji-woo	Speed skating	Girls' 1500 m	15 February
Gold	Kim Min-seok	Speed skating	Boys' 1500 m	15 February
Gold	Hong Kyung-hwan	Short track	Boys' 500 m	16 February
Gold	Kim Magnus	Cross-country skiing	Boys' 10 km	18 February
Gold	Park Ji-woo	Speed skating	Girls' mass start	19 February
Gold	Kim Min-seok	Speed skating	Boys' mass start	19 February
Silver	Lee Su-youn	Short track	Girls' 1000 m	14 February
Silver	Kim Magnus	Cross-country skiing	Boys' sprint	16 February
Silver	Chung Jae-woong	Speed skating	Boys' mass start	19 February
Bronze	Chung Jae-woong	Speed skating	Boys' 500 m	13 February
Bronze	Jeong Yu-rim	Snowboarding	Girls' halfpipe	14 February
Bronze	Kim Min-sun	Speed skating	Girls' mass start	19 February

=== Medalists in mixed NOCs events ===
Medal	Name	Sport	Event	Date
Gold	Chung Jae-woong	Speed skating	Mixed team sprint	17 February
Gold	Kim Ji-yoo	Short track	Mixed team relay	20 February

== Alpine skiing ==
Boys

Athlete	Event	Run 1		Run 2		Total	
Athlete	Event	Time	Rank	Time	Rank	Time	Rank
Bae Jun-woo	Slalom	53.88	29	53.65	27	1:47.53	26
Bae Jun-woo	Giant slalom	1:25.32	36	1:25.35	29	2:50.67	29

Girls

Athlete	Event	Run 1		Run 2		Total	
Athlete	Event	Time	Rank	Time	Rank	Time	Rank
Hong Ye-bin	Slalom	1:03.36	26	did not finish			
Hong Ye-bin	Giant slalom	DNF		did not advance			

== Biathlon ==
Boys

Athlete	Event	Time	Misses	Rank
Wang Woo-jin	Sprint	21:56.1	4	38
Wang Woo-jin	Pursuit	34:31.3	5	34

Girls

Athlete	Event	Time	Misses	Rank
Abe Mariya	Sprint	19:24.7	0	11
Abe Mariya	Pursuit	33:12.2	12	42

Mixed

Athletes	Event	Time	Misses	Rank
Abe Mariya; Wang Woo-jin	Single mixed relay	48:34.8	4+17	26

== Bobsleigh ==
Athlete	Event	Run 1		Run 2		Total	
Athlete	Event	Time	Rank	Time	Rank	Time	Rank
Kim Sang-min	Boys'	58.02	9	58.53	12	1:56.55	11

== Cross-country skiing ==
Boys

Athlete	Event	Qualification		Quarterfinal		Semifinal		Final	
Athlete	Event	Time	Rank	Time	Rank	Time	Rank	Time	Rank
Kim Magnus	10 km freestyle	—N/a						23:04.8	1st place, gold medalist(s)
Kim Magnus	Classical sprint	2:57.16	3 Q	3:02.34	1 Q	2:57.19	1 Q	2:55.72	2nd place, silver medalist(s)
Kim Magnus	Cross-country cross	3:01.45	1 Q	—N/a		3:05.14	1 Q	2:59.56	1st place, gold medalist(s)

Girls

Athlete	Event	Qualification		Quarterfinal		Semifinal		Final	
Athlete	Event	Time	Rank	Time	Rank	Time	Rank	Time	Rank
Je Sang-mi	5 km freestyle	—N/a						14:55.6	25
Je Sang-mi	Classical sprint	3:54.02	34	did not advance					
Je Sang-mi	Cross-country cross	4:09.03	35	—N/a		did not advance			

== Curling ==
=== Mixed team ===
Team

- Hong Jun-yeong
- Kim Ho-geon
- Lee Ji-young
- Oh Su-yun

Round Robin

Group B	Skip	W	L
Canada	Mary Fay	7	0
Great Britain	Ross Whyte	6	1
Sweden	Johan Nygren	5	2
Norway	Maia Ramsfjell	4	3
South Korea	Hong Yun-jeong	3	4
Czech Republic	Pavel Mareš	2	5
Estonia	Eiko-Siim Peips	1	6
Brazil	Victor Santos	0	7

Draw 1

Sheet D	1	2	3	4	5	6	7	8	Final
South Korea (Hong) 🔨	0	1	0	0	0	0	1	X	2
Great Britain (Whyte)	2	0	1	1	2	3	0	X	9

Draw 2

Sheet C	1	2	3	4	5	6	7	8	Final
Estonia (Peips) 🔨	0	1	0	2	0	0	1	0	4
South Korea (Hong)	3	0	1	0	1	0	0	1	6

Draw 3

Sheet C	1	2	3	4	5	6	7	8	Final
South Korea (Hong)	1	0	1	1	0	0	0	X	3
Sweden (Nygren) 🔨	0	2	0	0	3	1	1	X	7

Draw 4

Sheet B	1	2	3	4	5	6	7	8	Final
South Korea (Hong)	0	2	2	0	1	2	0	X	7
Czech Republic (Mareš) 🔨	2	0	0	0	0	0	1	X	3

Draw 5

Sheet A	1	2	3	4	5	6	7	8	Final
South Korea (Hong) 🔨	5	2	2	1	0	2	X	X	12
Brazil (Santos)	0	0	0	0	1	0	X	X	1

Draw 6

Sheet D	1	2	3	4	5	6	7	8	Final
Canada (Fay)	0	1	2	0	0	3	X	X	6
South Korea (Hong) 🔨	0	0	0	0	0	0	X	X	0

Draw 7

Sheet A	1	2	3	4	5	6	7	8	9	Final
Norway (Ramsfjell)	0	0	0	1	1	1	2	0	2	7
South Korea (Hong) 🔨	0	3	0	0	0	0	0	2	0	5

=== Mixed doubles ===
Athletes	Event	Round of 32	Round of 16	Quarterfinals	Semifinals	Final / BM	
Athletes	Event	Opposition Result	Opposition Result	Opposition Result	Opposition Result	Opposition Result	Rank
Mili Smith (GBR); Hong Jun-yeong (KOR)	Mixed doubles	Thompson (NZL); Middleton (CAN); L 2 – 8	did not advance				
Lee Ji-young (KOR); Johan Nygren (SWE)	Mixed doubles	Farrell (USA); Smith (NZL); W 8 – 1	Zhao (CHN); Haarstad (NOR); L 6 – 11	did not advance			
Oh Su-yun (KOR); Tunic Esenboga (TUR)	Mixed doubles	Arkhipova (RUS); Neilson (NZL); W 11 – 4	Han (CHN); Whyte (GBR); L 6 – 8	did not advance			
Maia Ramsfjell (NOR); Kim Ho-geon (KOR)	Mixed doubles	Smith (NZL); Lockmann (SUI); W 10 – 4	Barros (BRA); Richardson (USA); W 9 – 7	Sasaki (JPN); Tardi (CAN); L 5 – 7	did not advance		

== Figure skating ==
Singles

Athlete	Event	SP		FS		Total	
Athlete	Event	Points	Rank	Points	Rank	Points	Rank
Cha Jun-hwan	Boys' singles	68.76	4	130.14	5	198.90	5
Byun Ji-hyun	Girls' singles	56.25	5	87.45	8	143.70	7

Couples

Athletes	Event	SP/SD		FS/FD		Total	
Athletes	Event	Points	Rank	Points	Rank	Points	Rank
Kim Su-yeon; Kim Hyung-tae	Pairs	35.86	8	72.67	8	108.53	8

Mixed NOC team trophy

Athletes	Event	Free skate/Free dance					
Athletes	Event	Ice dance	Pairs	Girls	Boys	Total	
Athletes	Event	Points Team points	Points Team points	Points Team points	Points Team points	Points	Rank
Team Courage; Anastasia Shpilevaya / Grigory Smirnov (RUS); Irma Caldara / Edoardo Caputo (ITA); Alexandra Hagarova (SVK); Cha Jun-hwan (KOR)	Team trophy	86.48; 8	68.81; 1	75.55; 2	139.97; 6	17	6
Team Hope; Emilia Kalehanava / Uladzislau Palkhouski (BLR); Kim Su-yeon / Kim Hyung-tae (KOR); Lucrezia Gennaro (ITA); Adrien Bannister (ITA)	Team trophy	65.42; 5	70.50; 2	83.64; 4	119.28; 5	16	7
Team Motivation; Guoste Damuleviciute / Deividas Kizala (LTU); Ekaterina Borisova / Dmitry Sopot (RUS); Byun Ji-hyun (KOR); Chew Kai Xiang (MAS)	Team trophy	55.56; 2	104.80; 8	99.94; 6	86.56; 2	18	4

== Freestyle skiing ==
Halfpipe

Athlete	Event	Final				
Athlete	Event	Run 1	Run 2	Run 3	Best	Rank
Lee Kang-bok	Boys' halfpipe	37.40	35.20	9.60	37.40	10

Slopestyle

Athlete	Event	Final			
Athlete	Event	Run 1	Run 2	Best	Rank
Lee Kang-bok	Boys' slopestyle	12.00	11.40	12.00	18

== Ice hockey ==
Athlete	Event	Qualification		Final	
Athlete	Event	Points	Rank	Points	Rank
Eom Su-yeon	Girls' individual skills challenge	15	5 Q	9	6

== Short track speed skating ==
Boys

Athlete	Event	Quarterfinal		Semifinal		Final	
Athlete	Event	Time	Rank	Time	Rank	Time	Rank
Hong Kyung-hwan	500 m	42.537	1 SA/B	41.944	2 FA	41.885	1st place, gold medalist(s)
Hong Kyung-hwan	1000 m	1:31.417	2 SA/B'	PEN		did not advance	
Hwang Dae-heon	500 m	41.968	1 SA/B	41.972	1 FA	PEN	
Hwang Dae-heon	1000 m	1:32.893	1 SA/B	1:27.312	1 FA	1:28.022	1st place, gold medalist(s)

Girls

Athlete	Event	Quarterfinal		Semifinal		Final	
Athlete	Event	Time	Rank	Time	Rank	Time	Rank
Kim Ji-yoo	500 m	44.253	1 SA/B	44.588	1 FA	PEN	
Kim Ji-yoo	1000 m	1:40.773	1 SA/B	1:35.442	1 FA	1:34.041	1st place, gold medalist(s)
Lee Su-youn	500 m	45.228	2 SA/B	46.014	2 FA	PEN	
Lee Su-youn	1000 m	1:37.417	1 SA/B	1:35.583	2 FA	1:34.118	2nd place, silver medalist(s)

Mixed team relay

Athlete	Event	Semifinal		Final	
Athlete	Event	Time	Rank	Time	Rank
Team B Ane Farstad (NOR); Kim Ji-yoo (KOR); Stijn Desmet (BEL); Quentin Fercoq (FRA)	Mixed team relay	4:16.206	2 FA	4:14.413	1st place, gold medalist(s)
Team D Gong Li (CHN); Lee Su-youn (KOR); Shaoang Liu (HUN); Yerkebulan Shamukhanov (KAZ)	Mixed team relay	PEN		did not advance	
Team E Gloria Ioriatti (ITA); Anna Seidel (GER); Aaron Heo (USA); Hong Kyung-hwan (KOR)	Mixed team relay	4:16.056	2 FA	PEN	
Team G Elizaveta Kuznetsova (RUS); Angelina Tarasova (RUS); Martinius Elvebakken (NOR); Hwang Dae-heon (KOR)	Mixed team relay	4:20.469	4 FB	4:23.553	5

Qualification Legend: FA=Final A (medal); FB=Final B (non-medal); FC=Final C (non-medal); FD=Final D (non-medal); SA/B=Semifinals A/B; SC/D=Semifinals C/D; ADV=Advanced to Next Round; PEN=Penalized

== Skeleton ==
Athlete	Event	Run 1		Run 2		Total	
Athlete	Event	Time	Rank	Time	Rank	Time	Rank
Jung Seunggi	Boys	54.51	6	54.86	10	1:49.37	8
Heo Hyegyo	Girls	57.51	16	57.51	15	1:55.02	17

== Snowboarding ==
Halfpipe

Athlete	Event	Final				
Athlete	Event	Run 1	Run 2	Run 3	Best	Rank
Lee Min-sik	Boys' halfpipe	77.00	20.25	77.50	77.50	4
Jeong Yu-rim	Girls' halfpipe	82.25	84.50	42.25	84.50	3rd place, bronze medalist(s)

Slopestyle

Athlete	Event	Final			
Athlete	Event	Run 1	Run 2	Best	Rank
Lee Min-sik	Boys' slopestyle	36.25	26.75	36.25	18
Ok Ho-gwang	Boys' slopestyle	30.25	18.75	30.25	20

== Speed skating ==
Boys

Athlete	Event	Race 1		Race 2		Final	
Athlete	Event	Time	Rank	Time	Rank	Time	Rank
Chung Jae-woong	500 m	37.24	6	36.89	3	74.13	3rd place, bronze medalist(s)
Chung Jae-woong	1500 m	—N/a				1:55.57	8
Chung Jae-woong	Mass start	—N/a				20 pts	2nd place, silver medalist(s)
Kim Min-seok	500 m	37.15	5	37.07	6	74.22	5
Kim Min-seok	1500 m	—N/a				1:51.35	1st place, gold medalist(s)
Kim Min-seok	Mass start	—N/a				30 pts	1st place, gold medalist(s)

Girls

Athlete	Event	Race 1		Race 2		Final	
Athlete	Event	Time	Rank	Time	Rank	Time	Rank
Kim Min-sun	500 m	39.30	1	39.36	1	78.66	1st place, gold medalist(s)
Kim Min-sun	1500 m	—N/a				2:11.76	16
Kim Min-sun	Mass start	—N/a				10 pts	3rd place, bronze medalist(s)
Park Ji-woo	500 m	40.33	4	40.37	4	80.71	4
Park Ji-woo	1500 m	—N/a				2:03.53	1st place, gold medalist(s)
Park Ji-woo	Mass start	—N/a				30 pts	1st place, gold medalist(s)

Mixed team sprint

Athletes	Event	Final	
Athletes	Event	Time	Rank
Team 1 Jasmin Guentert (SUI); Kim Min-sun (KOR); Isa Izmailov (RUS); Jeffrey Rosanelli (ITA)	Mixed team sprint	1:59.75	7
Team 4 Camilla Evjevik (NOR); Park Ji-woo (KOR); Jonas Kristensen (NOR); Gawel Oficjalski (POL)	Mixed team sprint	1:59.93	8
Team 6 Noemi Bonazza (ITA); Sumiya Buyantogtokh (MGL); Chung Jae-woong (KOR); Shen Manyang (CHN)	Mixed team sprint	1:57.85	1st place, gold medalist(s)
Team 13; Sofya Napolskikh (RUS); Elena Samkova (RUS); Jaakko Hautamaki (FIN); Kim Min-seok (KOR)	Mixed team sprint	1:58.97	5

== See also ==
- South Korea at the 2016 Summer Olympics
