= Short-track speed skating at the 2016 Winter Youth Olympics – Boys' 500 metres =

Boys' 500 metres at the II Winter Youth Olympic Games
- Venue: Gjøvik Olympic Cavern Hall
- Dates: 16 February
- Competitors: 16 from 13 nations
- Winning time: 41.885

Medalists
1st place, gold medalist(s)		Hong Kyung-hwan	South Korea
2nd place, silver medalist(s)		Kazuki Yoshinaga	Japan
3rd place, bronze medalist(s)		Ma Wei	China

The boys' 500 metres in short track speed skating at the 2016 Winter Youth Olympics was held on 16 February at the Gjøvik Olympic Cavern Hall.

== Results ==
QAB – qualified for the semifinals A/B
QCD – qualified for the semifinals C/D
PEN – penalty
ADA – advanced

=== Quarterfinals ===
Rank	Heat	Name	Country	Time	Notes
1	1	Hong Kyung-hwan	South Korea	42.537	QAB
2	1	Pavel Sitnikov	Russia	42.652	QAB
3	1	Martinius Elvebakken	Norway	45.998	QCD
4	1	Shaoang Liu	Hungary	DNF	QCD
1	2	Stijn Desmet	Belgium	42.993	QAB
2	2	Kazuki Yoshinaga	Japan	43.657	QAB
3	2	Aaron Heo	United States	44.052	QCD
4	2	Tjerk de Boer	Netherlands	DNF	QCD
1	3	Ma Wei	China	42.208	QAB
2	3	Kiichi Shigehiro	Japan	42.671	QAB
3	3	András Sziklási	Hungary	44.918	QCD
4	3	Moritz Kreuseler	Germany	45.105	QCD
1	4	Hwang Dae-heon	South Korea	41.968	QAB
2	4	Quentin Fercoq	France	42.404	QAB
3	4	Yerkebulan Shamukhanov	Kazakhstan	44.170	QCD
4	4	Kārlis Krūzbergs	Latvia	45.766	QCD

=== Semifinals ===
==== Semifinals C/D ====
QC – qualified for Final C
QD – qualified for Final D
PEN – penalty

Rank	Heat	Name	Country	Time	Notes
1	1	Tjerk de Boer	Netherlands	43.830	QC
2	1	Aaron Heo	United States	44.396	QC
3	1	Moritz Kreuseler	Germany	44.974	QD
4	1	Martinius Elvebakken	Norway	45.018	QD
1	2	Shaoang Liu	Hungary	44.349	QC
2	2	András Sziklási	Hungary	44.651	QC
3	2	Kārlis Krūzbergs	Latvia	47.371	QD
4	2	Yerkebulan Shamukhanov	Kazakhstan	DNF	QD

==== Semifinals A/B ====
QA – qualified for Final A
QB – qualified for Final B

Rank	Heat	Name	Country	Time	Notes
1	1	Ma Wei	China	41.680	QA
2	1	Hong Kyung-hwan	South Korea	41.944	QA
3	1	Pavel Sitnikov	Russia	42.327	QB
4	1	Kiichi Shigehiro	Japan	42.403	QB
1	2	Hwang Dae-heon	South Korea	41.972	QA
2	2	Kazuki Yoshinaga	Japan	42.416	QA
3	2	Stijn Desmet	Belgium	42.846	QB
4	2	Quentin Fercoq	France	42.997	QB

=== Finals ===
==== Final D ====
Rank	Name	Country	Time	Notes
13	Yerkebulan Shamukhanov	Kazakhstan	44.916	
14	Martinius Elvebakken	Norway	45.001	
15	Kārlis Krūzbergs	Latvia	45.680	
16	Moritz Kreuseler	Germany	45.787	

==== Final C ====
Rank	Name	Country	Time	Notes
9	Shaoang Liu	Hungary	44.366	
10	Tjerk de Boer	Netherlands	44.695	
11	Aaron Heo	United States	45.413	
12	András Sziklási	Hungary		PEN

==== Final B ====
Rank	Name	Country	Time	Notes
5	Stijn Desmet	Belgium	42.716	
6	Pavel Sitnikov	Russia	42.731	
7	Quentin Fercoq	France	43.032	
8	Kiichi Shigehiro	Japan	43.041	

==== Final A ====
Rank	Name	Country	Time	Notes
1st place, gold medalist(s)	Hong Kyung-hwan	South Korea	41.885	
2nd place, silver medalist(s)	Kazuki Yoshinaga	Japan	41.969	
3rd place, bronze medalist(s)	Ma Wei	China	42.129	
4	Hwang Dae-heon	South Korea		PEN
