= Alpine skiing at the 2016 Winter Youth Olympics – Girls' super-G =

Girls' super-G at the II Winter Youth Olympic Games
- Venue: Hafjell, Norway
- Date: 13 February
- Competitors: 44 from 36 nations
- Winning time: 1:11.93

Medalists
1st place, gold medalist(s)		Nadine Fest	Austria
2nd place, silver medalist(s)		Julia Scheib	Austria
3rd place, bronze medalist(s)		Aline Danioth	Switzerland

The girls' Super-G competition of the 2016 Winter Youth Olympics was held at the Hafjell Olympic Slope near Lillehammer, Norway, on Saturday, 13 February.

== Results ==
The race was started at 10:30.

Rank	Bib	Name	Country	Time	Difference
1st place, gold medalist(s)	6	Nadine Fest	Austria	1:11.93	—
2nd place, silver medalist(s)	14	Julia Scheib	Austria	1:12.56	+0.63
3rd place, bronze medalist(s)	13	Aline Danioth	Switzerland	1:12.69	+0.76
4	5	Mélanie Meillard	Switzerland	1:13.05	+1.12
5	10	Katrin Hirtl-Stanggaßinger	Germany	1:13.61	+1.68
6	8	Kristiane Bekkestad	Norway	1:13.66	+1.73
7	16	Ali Nullmeyer	Canada	1:13.98	+2.05
8	26	Daria Krajewska	Poland	1:14.44	+2.51
9	15	Sofia Pizzato	Italy	1:14.47	+2.54
10	4	Keely Cashman	United States	1:14.52	+2.59
11	11	Jonna Luthman	Sweden	1:14.66	+2.73
12	24	Kenza Lacheb	France	1:14.73	+2.80
13	12	Lucia Rispler	Germany	1:15.17	+3.24
14	30	Tereza Jančová	Slovakia	1:15.93	+4.00
15	25	Carlotta Saracco	Italy	1:16.18	+4.25
16	17	Kathryn Parker	Australia	1:16.41	+4.48
17	23	Ida Sofie Brøns	Denmark	1:16.52	+4.59
18	27	Andrea Louise Arnold	Czech Republic	1:16.68	+4.75
19	18	Amelia Smart	Canada	1:16.84	+4.91
20	45	Elizabeth Reid	New Zealand	1:16.87	+4.94
21	34	Chisaki Maeda	Japan	1:16.92	+4.99
22	1	Anastasiia Silanteva	Russia	1:17.08	+5.15
23	22	Sabrina Simader	Kenya	1:17.09	+5.16
24	42	Chiara Archam	Hungary	1:17.17	+5.24
25	28	Elvedina Muzaferija	Bosnia and Herzegovina	1:17.56	+5.63
26	31	Hólmfríður Friðgeirsdóttir	Iceland	1:17.92	+5.99
27	40	Živa Otoničar	Slovenia	1:18.18	+6.25
28	33	Francesca Baruzzi	Argentina	1:18.34	+6.41
29	41	Claire Tan	Netherlands	1:18.48	+6.55
30	43	Žanete Gedra	Latvia	1:19.63	+7.70
31	19	Yekaterina Karpova	Kazakhstan	1:20.07	+8.14
32	20	Mirentxu Miquel	Spain	1:20.75	+8.82
33	36	Milica Kovačević	Serbia	1:21.54	+9.61
34	44	Lorita Stoimenova	Bulgaria	1:22.07	+10.14
35	35	Anna Lotta Jõgeva	Estonia	1:24.50	+12.57
36	32	Iulia Boier	Romania	1:24.65	+12.72
37	37	Mariia Ponomarenko	Ukraine	1:26.48	+14.55
	2	Kim Vanreusel	Belgium	DNF	
	3	Meta Hrovat	Slovenia	DNF	
	7	Kajsa Vickhoff Lie	Norway	DNF	
	9	Camille Cerutti	France	DNF	
	21	Yasmin Cooper	Great Britain	DNF	
	29	Lana Zbašnik	Croatia	DNF	
	39	Anastasia Mantsiou	Greece	DNF	
	38	Selin Acikgöz	Turkey	DNS	
