= Latvia at the 2016 Winter Youth Olympics =

- IOC code: LAT
- NOC: Latvian Olympic Committee
- Website: www.olimpiade.lv

in Lillehammer
- Competitors: 16 in 7 sports
- Medals Ranked 16th: Gold 1 Silver 1 Bronze 0 Total 2

Winter Youth Olympics appearances
- 2012; 2016; 2020; 2024

Latvia competed at the 2016 Winter Youth Olympics in Lillehammer, Norway from 12 to 21 February 2016.

== Medalists ==
Medal	Name	Sport	Event	Date
Gold	Kristers Aparjods	Luge	Boys' singles	14 February
Silver	Deniss Vasiljevs	Figure skating	Boys' singles	15 February

=== Medalists in mixed NOCs events ===
Medal	Name	Sport	Event	Date
Silver	Diana Nikitina	Figure skating	Team trophy	20 February
Bronze	Karlis Kruzbergs	Short track	Mixed team relay	20 February
Bronze	Deniss Vasiljevs	Figure skating	Team trophy	20 February

== Alpine skiing ==
Boys

Athlete	Event	Run 1		Run 2		Total	
Athlete	Event	Time	Rank	Time	Rank	Time	Rank
Zaks Gedra	Slalom	DNF		did not advance			
Zaks Gedra	Giant slalom	1:20.36	16	did not finish			
Zaks Gedra	Super-G	—				1:15.42	36
Zaks Gedra	Combined	1:14.73	30	41.97	10	1:56.70	16

Girls

Athlete	Event	Run 1		Run 2		Total	
Athlete	Event	Time	Rank	Time	Rank	Time	Rank
Zanete Gedra	Super-G	—				1:19.63	30

== Biathlon ==
Boys

Athlete	Event	Time	Misses	Rank
Ernests Loktevs	Sprint	22:27.5	3	41
Ernests Loktevs	Pursuit	35:48.0	4	41

Girls

Athlete	Event	Time	Misses	Rank
Nora Osite	Sprint	22:12.5	2	45
Nora Osite	Pursuit	34.11.2	6	43

Mixed

Athletes	Event	Time	Misses	Rank
Nora Osite; Ernests Loktevs	Single mixed relay	47:37.3	6+18	23

== Cross-country skiing ==
Boys

Athlete	Event	Qualification		Quarterfinal		Semifinal		Final	
Athlete	Event	Time	Rank	Time	Rank	Time	Rank	Time	Rank
Raimo Vīgants	10 km freestyle	—						26:35.9	31
Raimo Vīgants	Classical sprint	3:06.42	12 Q	3:13.50	5	did not advance			
Raimo Vīgants	Cross-country cross	3:13.32	13 Q	—		3:11.43	7	did not advance	

Girls

Athlete	Event	Qualification		Quarterfinal		Semifinal		Final	
Athlete	Event	Time	Rank	Time	Rank	Time	Rank	Time	Rank
Patricija Eiduka	5 km freestyle	—						14:23.4	21
Patricija Eiduka	Classical sprint	3:50.56	30 Q	3:48.44	6	did not advance			
Patricija Eiduka	Cross-country cross	4:12.10	37	—		did not advance			

== Figure skating ==
Singles

Athlete	Event	SP		FS		Total	
Athlete	Event	Points	Rank	Points	Rank	Points	Rank
Deniss Vasiljevs	Boys' singles	70.16	3	144.27	1	214.43	2nd place, silver medalist(s)
Diana Nikitina	Girls' singles	58.81	3	106.79	4	165.60	5

Mixed NOC team trophy

Athletes	Event	Free skate/Free dance					
Athletes	Event	Ice dance	Pairs	Girls	Boys	Total	
Athletes	Event	Points Team points	Points Team points	Points Team points	Points Team points	Points	Rank
Team Discovery; Marjorie Lajoie / Zachary Lagha (CAN); Gao Yumeng / Li Bowen (CHN); Fruzsina Medgyesi (HUN); Deniss Vasiljevs (LAT)	Team trophy	73.78; 6	74.45; 3	71.26; 1	149.09; 8	18	3rd place, bronze medalist(s)
Team Future; Julia Wagret / Mathieu Couyras (FRA); Anna Duskova / Martin Bidar (CZE); Diana Nikitina (LAT); Ivan Shmuratko (UKR)	Team trophy	63.06; 3	103.91; 7	107.47; 7	89.66; 3	20	2nd place, silver medalist(s)

== Luge ==
Individual sleds

Athlete	Event	Run 1		Run 2		Total	
Athlete	Event	Time	Rank	Time	Rank	Time	Rank
Kristers Aparjods	Boys	47.691	1	47.618	1	1:35.309	1st place, gold medalist(s)
Anda Upite	Girls	53.601	9	53.821	10	1:47.422	9
Kaspars Slahota; Aksels Tupe	Doubles	54.350	10	53.819	8	1:48.169	9

Mixed team relay

Athlete	Event	Girls		Boys		Doubles		Total	
Athlete	Event	Time	Rank	Time	Rank	Time	Rank	Time	Rank
Anda Upite; Kristers Aparjods; Aksels Tupe; Kaspars Slahota	Team relay	57.887	7	57.085	1	59.715	6	2:54.687	5

== Short track speed skating ==
Boys

Athlete	Event	Quarterfinal		Semifinal		Final	
Athlete	Event	Time	Rank	Time	Rank	Time	Rank
Karlis Kruzbergs	500 m	45.766	4 SC/D	47.371	3 FD	45.680	14
Karlis Kruzbergs	1000 m	1:33.621	4 SC/D	1:54.695	2 FC	1:40.632	11

Mixed team relay

Athlete	Event	Semifinal		Final	
Athlete	Event	Time	Rank	Time	Rank
Team F Katrin Manoilova (BUL); Anita Nagay (KAZ); Karlis Kruzbergs (LAT); Kazuki Yoshinaga (JPN)	Mixed team relay	4:15.669	1 FA	4:17.181	3rd place, bronze medalist(s)

Qualification Legend: FA=Final A (medal); FB=Final B (non-medal); FC=Final C (non-medal); FD=Final D (non-medal); SA/B=Semifinals A/B; SC/D=Semifinals C/D; ADV=Advanced to Next Round; PEN=Penalized

== Skeleton ==
Athlete	Event	Run 1		Run 2		Total	
Athlete	Event	Time	Rank	Time	Rank	Time	Rank
Krists Netlaus	Boys	54.09	4	54.09	4	1:48.18	4
Paula Lace	Girls	56.39	6	56.07	3	1:52.46	4
Darta Zunte	Girls	56.23	3	56.70	10	1:52.93	5

== See also ==
- Latvia at the 2016 Summer Olympics
