= Moldova at the 2016 Winter Youth Olympics =

- IOC code: MDA
- NOC: Moldova Olympic Committee
- Website: www.olympic.md

in Lillehammer
- Competitors: 2 in 2 sports
- Medals: Gold 0 Silver 0 Bronze 0 Total 0

Winter Youth Olympics appearances
- 2012; 2016; 2020; 2024

Moldova competed at the 2016 Winter Youth Olympics in Lillehammer, Norway from 12 to 21 February 2016.

== Cross-country skiing ==
Boys

Athlete	Event	Qualification		Quarterfinal		Semifinal		Final	
Athlete	Event	Time	Rank	Time	Rank	Time	Rank	Time	Rank
Cristian Bocancea	10 km freestyle	—						27:49.7	39
Cristian Bocancea	Classical sprint	3:48.01	47	did not advance					
Cristian Bocancea	Cross-country cross	3:34.37	39	—		did not advance			

== Luge ==
Moldova qualified one boy.

Boys

Athlete	Event	Final			
Athlete	Event	Run 1	Run 2	Total	Rank
Leonard Cepoi	Boys' Singles	48.656	48.580	1:37.236	9

== See also ==
- Moldova at the 2016 Summer Olympics
