= Iceland at the 2016 Winter Youth Olympics =

- IOC code: ISL
- NOC: Icelandic Olympic Committee
- Website: www.olympic.is

in Lillehammer
- Competitors: 3 in 2 sports
- Medals: Gold 0 Silver 0 Bronze 0 Total 0

Winter Youth Olympics appearances
- 2012; 2016; 2020; 2024

Iceland competed at the 2016 Winter Youth Olympics in Lillehammer, Norway from 12 to 21 February 2016.

== Alpine skiing ==
Boys

Athlete	Event	Run 1		Run 2		Total	
Athlete	Event	Time	Rank	Time	Rank	Time	Rank
Bjarki Gudjonsson	Slalom	55.41	34	did not finish			
Bjarki Gudjonsson	Giant slalom	1:30.61	45	1:29.48	35	3:00.09	35
Bjarki Gudjonsson	Super-G	—N/a				DNS	

Girls

Athlete	Event	Run 1		Run 2		Total	
Athlete	Event	Time	Rank	Time	Rank	Time	Rank
Hólmfríður Dóra Friðgeirsdóttir	Slalom	DNF		did not advance			
Hólmfríður Dóra Friðgeirsdóttir	Giant slalom	1:27.32	28	DNF			
Hólmfríður Dóra Friðgeirsdóttir	Super-G	—N/a				1:17.92	26

== Cross-country skiing ==
Boys

Athlete	Event	Qualification		Quarterfinal		Semifinal		Final	
Athlete	Event	Time	Rank	Time	Rank	Time	Rank	Time	Rank
Dagur Benediktsson	10 km freestyle	—N/a						28:14.2	43
Dagur Benediktsson	Classical sprint	3:19.32	36	did not advance					
Dagur Benediktsson	Cross-country cross	3:37.17	42	—N/a		did not advance			

== See also ==
- Iceland at the 2016 Summer Olympics
