= Moldova at the 2012 Winter Youth Olympics =

- IOC code: MDA
- NOC: Moldova Olympic Committee
- Website: www.olympic.md

in Innsbruck
- Competitors: 1 in 1 sport
- Flag bearer: Irina Cozonac
- Medals: Gold 0 Silver 0 Bronze 0 Total 0

Winter Youth Olympics appearances
- 2012; 2016; 2020; 2024

Moldova competed at the 2012 Winter Youth Olympics in Innsbruck, Austria. The Moldovan team was made up of one biathlete and two officials (a coach and the chef de mission).

== Biathlon ==
Moldova qualified one girl in biathlon.

Girl

Athlete	Event	Final		
Athlete	Event	Time	Misses	Rank
Irina Cozonac	Sprint	25:17.2	3	46
Irina Cozonac	Pursuit	DNF		

== See also ==
- Moldova at the 2012 Summer Olympics
