= Belgium at the 2016 Winter Youth Olympics =

- IOC code: BEL
- NOC: Belgian Olympic Committee
- Website: www.teambelgium.be

in Lillehammer
- Competitors: 9 in 7 sports
- Flag bearer: Sam Maes
- Medals Ranked 24th: Gold 0 Silver 1 Bronze 0 Total 1

Winter Youth Olympics appearances (overview)
- 2012; 2016; 2020; 2024

Belgium competed at the 2016 Winter Youth Olympics in Lillehammer, Norway from 12 to 21 February 2016.

== Medalists ==
Medal	Name	Sport	Event	Date
Silver	Xander Vercammen	Freestyle skiing	Boys' ski cross	15 February

=== Medalists in mixed NOCs events ===
Medal	Name	Sport	Event	Date
Gold	Stijn Desmet	Short track	Mixed team relay	20 February

== Alpine skiing ==
Boys

Athlete	Event	Run 1		Run 2		Total	
Athlete	Event	Time	Rank	Time	Rank	Time	Rank
Sam Maes	Slalom	53.63	28	50.59	10	1:44.22	19
Sam Maes	Giant slalom	1:19.62	10	1:19.18	8	2:38.80	7
Sam Maes	Super-G	—				1:13.30	23
Sam Maes	Combined	1:13.63	22	1:04.27	30	2:17.90	30

Girls

Athlete	Event	Run 1		Run 2		Total	
Athlete	Event	Time	Rank	Time	Rank	Time	Rank
Kim van Reusel	Slalom	57.27	12	52.57	11	1:49.84	12
Kim van Reusel	Giant slalom	DNF		did not advance			
Kim van Reusel	Super-G	—				DNF	

Parallel mixed team

Athletes	Event	Round of 16	Quarterfinals	Semifinals	Final / BM	
Athletes	Event	Opposition Score	Opposition Score	Opposition Score	Opposition Score	Rank
Kim van Reusel; Sam Maes	Parallel mixed team	Switzerland; L 1 - 3	did not advance			

== Biathlon ==
Boys

Athlete	Event	Time	Misses	Rank
Tim De Ridder	Sprint	26:11.4	6	48
Tim De Ridder	Pursuit	43:00.9	2	48

== Cross-country skiing ==
Boys

Athlete	Event	Qualification		Quarterfinal		Semifinal		Final	
Athlete	Event	Time	Rank	Time	Rank	Time	Rank	Time	Rank
Thibaut De Marre	10 km freestyle	—						26:10.2	25
Thibaut De Marre	Classical sprint	3:15.32	34	did not advance					
Thibaut De Marre	Cross-country cross	3:19.67	31	—		did not advance			

== Freestyle skiing ==
Ski cross

Athlete	Event	Qualification		Group heats		Semifinal	Final
Athlete	Event	Time	Rank	Points	Rank	Position	Position
Xander Vercammen	Boys' ski cross	44.14	5 Q	14	6 Q	1 FA	2nd place, silver medalist(s)

== Ice hockey ==
Athlete	Event	Qualification		Final	
Athlete	Event	Points	Rank	Points	Rank
Chinouk Van Calster	Girls' individual skills challenge	11	9	did not advance	

== Short track speed skating ==
Boys

Athlete	Event	Quarterfinal		Semifinal		Final	
Athlete	Event	Time	Rank	Time	Rank	Time	Rank
Stijn Desmet	500 m	42.993	1 SA/B	42.846	3 FB	42.716	4
Stijn Desmet	1000 m	1:34.578	3 ADV	1:28.946	3 FB	1:41.829	7

Mixed team relay

Athlete	Event	Semifinal		Final	
Athlete	Event	Time	Rank	Time	Rank
Team B Ane Farstad (NOR); Kim Ji-yoo (KOR); Stijn Desmet (BEL); Quentin Fercoq (FRA)	Mixed team relay	4:16.206	2 FA	4:14.413	1st place, gold medalist(s)

Qualification Legend: FA=Final A (medal); FB=Final B (non-medal); FC=Final C (non-medal); FD=Final D (non-medal); SA/B=Semifinals A/B; SC/D=Semifinals C/D; ADV=Advanced to Next Round; PEN=Penalized

== Snowboarding ==
Halfpipe

Athlete	Event	Final				
Athlete	Event	Run 1	Run 2	Run 3	Best	Rank
Stef Van De Weyer	Boys' halfpipe	22.25	48.25	44.25	48.25	13

Slopestyle

Athlete	Event	Final			
Athlete	Event	Run 1	Run 2	Best	Rank
Stef Van De Weyer	Boys' slopestyle	73.00	36.00	73.00	9
Manon Suffys	Girls' slopestyle	21.25	53.75	53.75	11

== See also ==
- Belgium at the 2016 Summer Olympics
