= Hungary at the 2016 Winter Youth Olympics =

- IOC code: HUN
- NOC: Hungarian Olympic Committee
- Website: www.olympic-hun.org

in Lillehammer
- Competitors: 15 in 9 sports
- Medals Ranked 22nd: Gold 0 Silver 1 Bronze 1 Total 2

Winter Youth Olympics appearances (overview)
- 2012; 2016; 2020; 2024

Hungary competed at the 2016 Winter Youth Olympics in Lillehammer, Norway from 12 to 21 February 2016.

== Medalists ==
Medal	Name	Sport	Event	Date
Silver	Petra Jaszapati	Short track	Girls' 500 m	16 February
Bronze	Shaoang Liu	Short track	Boys' 1000 m	14 February

=== Medalists in mixed NOCs events ===
Medal	Name	Sport	Event	Date
Silver	Petra Jaszapati	Short track	Mixed team relay	20 February
Bronze	Fruzsina Medgyesi	Figure skating	Team trophy	20 February

== Alpine skiing ==
Boys

Athlete	Event	Run 1		Run 2		Total	
Athlete	Event	Time	Rank	Time	Rank	Time	Rank
Barnabas Szollos	Slalom	51.09	11	50.27	7	1:41.36	7
Barnabas Szollos	Giant slalom	1:21.28	22	1:19.50	11	2:40.78	14
Barnabas Szollos	Super-G	—N/a				1:12.38	16
Barnabas Szollos	Combined	DNF		did not advance			

Girls

Athlete	Event	Run 1		Run 2		Total	
Athlete	Event	Time	Rank	Time	Rank	Time	Rank
Chiara Archam	Slalom	DNF		did not advance			
Chiara Archam	Giant slalom	1:23.71	19	1:20.80	20	2:44.51	20
Chiara Archam	Super-G	—N/a				1:17.17	24
Chiara Archam	Combined	1:19.02	25	47.59	21	2:06.61	21

== Biathlon ==
Boys

Athlete	Event	Time	Misses	Rank
Aron Herneczky	Sprint	22:04.5	1	40
Aron Herneczky	Pursuit	34:38.9	2	35

Girls

Athlete	Event	Time	Misses	Rank
Mirella Veres	Sprint	22:01.9	3	43
Mirella Veres	Pursuit	31:38.2	3	39

Mixed

Athletes	Event	Time	Misses	Rank
Mirella Veres; Aron Herneczky	Single mixed relay	45:42.0	0+16	19

== Cross-country skiing ==
Boys

Athlete	Event	Qualification		Quarterfinal		Semifinal		Final	
Athlete	Event	Time	Rank	Time	Rank	Time	Rank	Time	Rank
Mate Gyallai	10 km freestyle	—N/a						30:14.8	48
Mate Gyallai	Classical sprint	3:26.88	40	did not advance					
Mate Gyallai	Cross-country cross	3:40.97	45	—N/a		did not advance			

== Figure skating ==
Singles

Athlete	Event	SP		FS		Total	
Athlete	Event	Points	Rank	Points	Rank	Points	Rank
Fruzsina Medgyesi	Girls' singles	43.45	14	74.16	14	117.61	14

Mixed NOC team trophy

Athletes	Event	Free skate/Free dance					
Athletes	Event	Ice dance	Pairs	Girls	Boys	Total	
Athletes	Event	Points Team points	Points Team points	Points Team points	Points Team points	Points	Rank
Team Discovery; Marjorie Lajoie / Zachary Lagha (CAN); Gao Yumeng / Li Bowen (CHN); Fruzsina Medgyesi (HUN); Deniss Vasiljevs (LAT)	Team trophy	73.78; 6	74.45; 3	71.26; 1	149.09; 8	18	(bronze)

== Freestyle skiing ==
Ski cross

Athlete	Event	Qualification		Group heats		Semifinal	Final
Athlete	Event	Time	Rank	Points	Rank	Position	Position
Bence Nagy	Boys' ski cross	46.77	15 Q	6	16	did not advance	

== Ice hockey ==
Athlete	Event	Qualification		Final	
Athlete	Event	Points	Rank	Points	Rank
Natan Vertes	Boys' individual skills challenge	16	4 Q	11	4

== Ski jumping ==
Athlete	Event	First round			Final			Total	
Athlete	Event	Distance	Points	Rank	Distance	Points	Rank	Points	Rank
Kristof Molnar	Boys' normal hill	53.0	25.0	19	63.0	39.3	19	64.3	19
Virag Voros	Girls' normal hill	62.5	44.2	13	62.5	45.3	13	89.5	13

== Short track speed skating ==
Boys

Athlete	Event	Quarterfinal		Semifinal		Final	
Athlete	Event	Time	Rank	Time	Rank	Time	Rank
Shaoang Liu	500 m	No Time	4 SC/D	44.349	1 FC	44.366	9
Shaoang Liu	1000 m	1:31.307	1 SA/B	1:27.428	2 FA	1:28.187	(bronze)
Andras Sziklasi	500 m	44.918	3 SC/D	44.651	2 FC	PEN	
Andras Sziklasi	1000 m	1:34.256	2 SA/B	1:31.209	4 ADV	1:29.324	5

Girls

Athlete	Event	Quarterfinal		Semifinal		Final	
Athlete	Event	Time	Rank	Time	Rank	Time	Rank
Petra Jaszapati	500 m	44.855	2 SA/B	44.864	2 FA	No Time	(silver)
Petra Jaszapati	1000 m	1:37.636	2 SA/B	1:36.385	2 FA	1:34.431	4

Mixed team relay

Athlete	Event	Semifinal		Final	
Athlete	Event	Time	Rank	Time	Rank
Team A April Shin (USA); Zang Yize (CHN); Pavel Sitnikov (RUS); Andras Sziklasi (HUN)	Mixed team relay	4:18.683	3 FB	4:25.169	6
Team C Petra Jaszapati (HUN); Julia Moore (AUS); Tjerk De Boer (NED); Kiichi Shigehiro (JPN)	Mixed team relay	4:15.332	1 FA	4:14.495	2nd place, silver medalist(s)
Team D Gong Li (CHN); Lee Su-youn (KOR); Shaoang Liu (HUN); Yerkebulan Shamukhanov (KAZ)	Mixed team relay	PEN		did not advance	

Qualification Legend: FA=Final A (medal); FB=Final B (non-medal); FC=Final C (non-medal); FD=Final D (non-medal); SA/B=Semifinals A/B; SC/D=Semifinals C/D; ADV=Advanced to Next Round; PEN=Penalized

== Snowboarding ==
Snowboard cross

Athlete	Event	Qualification		Group heats		Semifinal	Final
Athlete	Event	Time	Rank	Points	Rank	Position	Position
Csongor Szasz	Boys' snowboard cross	54.68	17	did not advance			
Zsofia Feher	Girls' snowboard cross	54.23	11 Q	8	13	did not advance	

== See also ==
- Hungary at the 2016 Summer Olympics
