= Bulgaria at the 2016 Winter Youth Olympics =

- IOC code: BUL
- NOC: Bulgarian Olympic Committee
- Website: www.bgolympic.org

in Lillehammer
- Competitors: 12 in 6 sports
- Medals Ranked 27th: Gold 0 Silver 0 Bronze 1 Total 1

Winter Youth Olympics appearances (overview)
- 2012; 2016; 2020; 2024

Bulgaria competed at the 2016 Winter Youth Olympics in Lillehammer, Norway from 12 to 21 February 2016.

== Medalists ==
| Medal | Name | Sport | Event | Date |
|---|---|---|---|---|
| Bronze | Katrin Manoilova | Short track | Girls' 500 m | 16 February |

=== Medalists in mixed NOCs events ===
| Medal | Name | Sport | Event | Date |
|---|---|---|---|---|
| Bronze | Valentin Miladinov | Snowboarding | Team snowboard ski cross | 16 February |
| Bronze | Katrin Manoilova | Short track | Mixed team relay | 20 February |

== Alpine skiing ==
Boys

| Athlete | Event | Run 1 | | Run 2 | | Total | |
| Athlete | Event | Time | Rank | Time | Rank | Time | Rank |
|---|---|---|---|---|---|---|---|
| Georgi Okolski | Slalom | DNF | | did not advance | | | |
| Georgi Okolski | Giant slalom | 1:23.91 | 31 | 1:21.98 | 24 | 2:45.89 | 25 |
| Georgi Okolski | Super-G | — | | | | 1:15.90 | 39 |
| Georgi Okolski | Combined | 1:16.54 | 36 | 42.40 | 13 | 1:58.94 | 22 |

Girls

| Athlete | Event | Run 1 | | Run 2 | | Total | |
| Athlete | Event | Time | Rank | Time | Rank | Time | Rank |
|---|---|---|---|---|---|---|---|
| Lorita Stoimenova | Slalom | 1:03.41 | 27 | 58.32 | 23 | 2:01.73 | 23 |
| Lorita Stoimenova | Giant slalom | 1:26.37 | 26 | 1:23.68 | 24 | 2:50.05 | 24 |
| Lorita Stoimenova | Super-G | — | | | | 1:22.07 | 34 |
| Lorita Stoimenova | Combined | DSQ | | did not advance | | | |

== Biathlon ==
Boys

| Athlete | Event | Time | Misses | Rank |
|---|---|---|---|---|
| Kristiyan Stoyanov | Sprint | 20:07.8 | 2 | 12 |
| Kristiyan Stoyanov | Pursuit | 31:47.4 | 6 | 17 |
| Petar Velchev | Sprint | 21:47.5 | 4 | 35 |
| Petar Velchev | Pursuit | 33:37.1 | 5 | 30 |

Girls

| Athlete | Event | Time | Misses | Rank |
|---|---|---|---|---|
| Milena Todorova | Sprint | 20:04.7 | 3 | 24 |
| Milena Todorova | Pursuit | 28:44.6 | 6 | 22 |
| Maria Zdravkova | Sprint | 20:38.2 | 3 | 26 |
| Maria Zdravkova | Pursuit | 30.47.7 | 7 | 34 |

Mixed

| Athletes | Event | Time | Misses | Rank |
|---|---|---|---|---|
| Milena Todorova; Kristiyan Stoyanov | Single mixed relay | 45:37.4 | 5+16 | 18 |
| Milena Todorova; Maria Zdravkova; Petar Velchev; Kristiyan Stoyanov | Mixed relay | 1:27:44.4 | 7+22 | 13 |

== Cross-country skiing ==
Boys

| Athlete | Event | Qualification | | Quarterfinal | | Semifinal | | Final | |
| Athlete | Event | Time | Rank | Time | Rank | Time | Rank | Time | Rank |
|---|---|---|---|---|---|---|---|---|---|
| Nikolay Viyachev | 10 km freestyle | — | | | | | | 27:21.8 | 36 |
| Nikolay Viyachev | Classical sprint | 3:12.15 | 25 Q | 3:18.37 | 5 | did not advance | | | |
| Nikolay Viyachev | Cross-country cross | 3:17.98 | 26 Q | — | | 3:17.30 | 8 | did not advance | |

Girls

| Athlete | Event | Qualification | | Quarterfinal | | Semifinal | | Final | |
| Athlete | Event | Time | Rank | Time | Rank | Time | Rank | Time | Rank |
|---|---|---|---|---|---|---|---|---|---|
| Nansi Okoro | 5 km freestyle | — | | | | | | 15:24.3 | 32 |
| Nansi Okoro | Classical sprint | 3:46.09 | 28 Q | 3:38.23 | 5 | did not advance | | | |
| Nansi Okoro | Cross-country cross | 4:06.80 | 32 | — | | did not advance | | | |

== Luge ==
Bulgaria qualified two athletes.

Boys

| Athlete | Event | Final | | | |
| Athlete | Event | Run 1 | Run 2 | Total | Rank |
|---|---|---|---|---|---|
| Ayduan Rizov | Boys' singles | did not finish | | | |
| Emili Yordanova | Girls' singles | 55.190 | 55.200 | 1:50.390 | 16 |

== Short track speed skating ==
Girls

| Athlete | Event | Quarterfinal | | Semifinal | | Final | |
| Athlete | Event | Time | Rank | Time | Rank | Time | Rank |
|---|---|---|---|---|---|---|---|
| Katrin Manoilova | 500 m | 45.897 | 1 SA/B | 46.512 | 3 FB | 46.337 | 3rd place, bronze medalist(s) |
| Katrin Manoilova | 1000 m | PEN | | did not advance | | | |

Mixed team relay

| Athlete | Event | Semifinal | | Final | |
| Athlete | Event | Time | Rank | Time | Rank |
|---|---|---|---|---|---|
| Team F Katrin Manoilova (BUL); Anita Nagay (KAZ); Karlis Kruzbergs (LAT); Kazuki Yoshinaga (JPN) | Mixed team relay | 4:15.669 | 1 FA | 4:17.181 | 3rd place, bronze medalist(s) |

Qualification Legend: FA=Final A (medal); FB=Final B (non-medal); FC=Final C (non-medal); FD=Final D (non-medal); SA/B=Semifinals A/B; SC/D=Semifinals C/D; ADV=Advanced to Next Round; PEN=Penalized

== Snowboarding ==
Snowboard cross

| Athlete | Event | Qualification | | Group heats | | Semifinal | Final |
| Athlete | Event | Time | Rank | Points | Rank | Position | Position |
|---|---|---|---|---|---|---|---|
| Valentin Miladinov | Boys' snowboard cross | 50.96 | 14 Q | 8 | 13 | did not advance | |

Snowboard and ski cross relay

| Athlete | Event | Quarterfinal | Semifinal | Final |
| Athlete | Event | Position | Position | Position |
|---|---|---|---|---|
| Daryna Kyrychenko (UKR); Veronica Edebo (SWE); Valentin Miladinov (BUL); David Mobaerg (SWE) | Team snowboard ski cross | 1 Q | 2 FA | 3rd place, bronze medalist(s) |

Qualification legend: FA – Qualify to medal round; FB – Qualify to consolation round

== See also ==
- Bulgaria at the 2016 Summer Olympics
