= Shione Kaminaga =

Japanese short-track speed skater (born 1999)

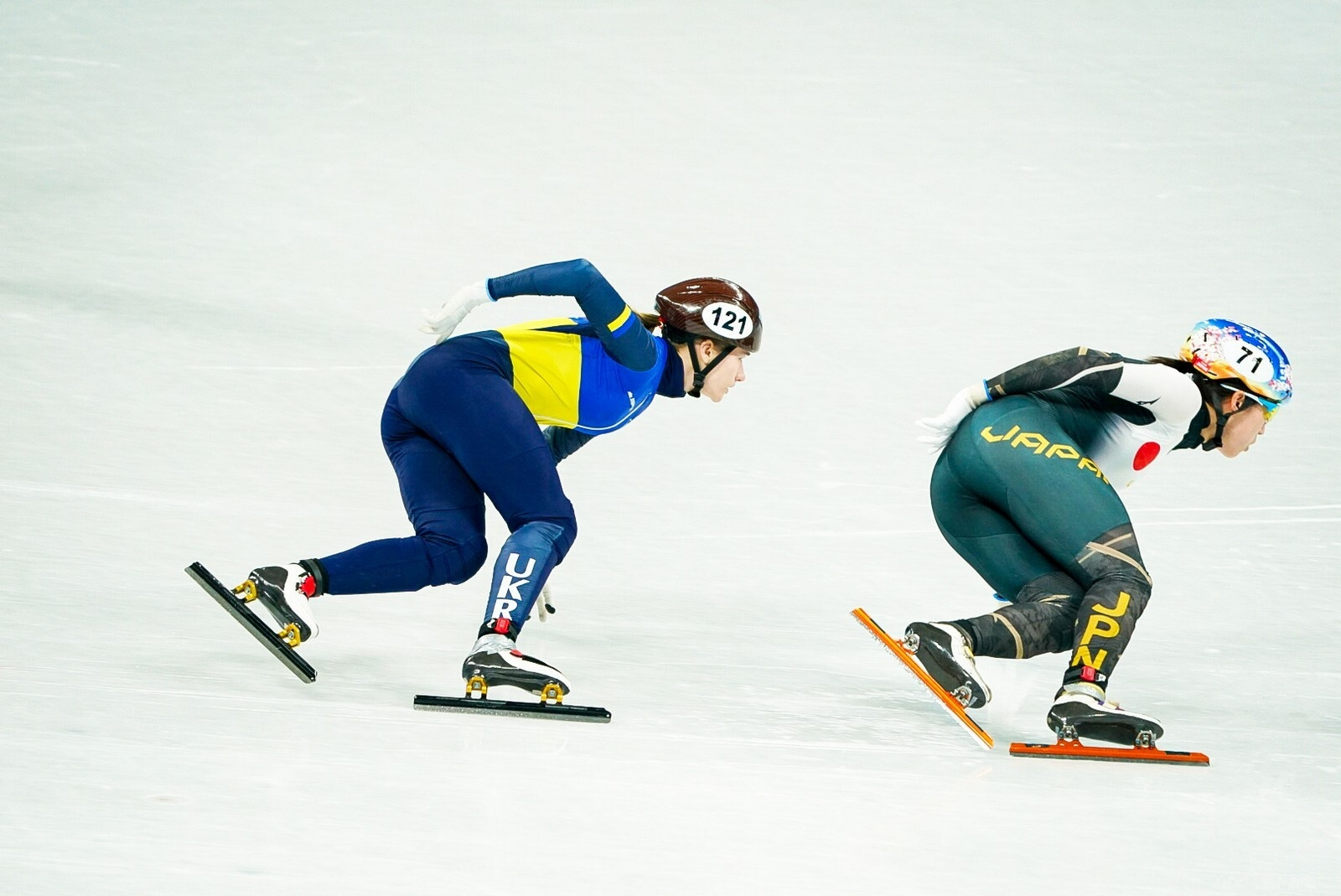
- 2022 Olympics (on the right)

Personal information
- Nationality: Japanese
- Born: 26 September 1999 (age 25); Nagano, Japan
- Height: 1.64 m (5 ft 5 in)
- Weight: 65 kg (143 lb)

Sport
- Country: Japan
- Sport: Short track speed skating

Shione Kaminaga (born 26 September 1999) is a Japanese short track speed skater. She competed in the 2018 and 2022 Winter Olympics.
