= 2016 Winter Youth Olympics medal table =

The 2016 Winter Youth Olympics medal table is a list of National Olympic Committees (NOCs) ranked by the number of gold medals won by their athletes during the 2016 Winter Youth Olympics, held in Lillehammer, Norway, from 12 to 21 February 2016. Approximately 1,068 athletes from 71 NOCs participated in 70 events in 15 sports.

== Medal table ==
The ranking in this table is based on information provided by the International Olympic Committee (IOC) and is consistent with IOC convention in its published medal tables. By default, the table is ordered by the number of gold medals the athletes from a nation have won (in this context, a "nation" is an entity represented by a National Olympic Committee). The number of silver medals is taken into consideration next and then the number of bronze medals. If nations are still tied, equal ranking is given and they are listed alphabetically by IOC country code.

In a number of events, there were teams in which athletes from different nations competed together. Medals won by these teams are included in the table as medals awarded to a mixed-NOCs team.

* Host nation (Norway)

Rank	Nation	Gold	Silver	Bronze	Total
1	United States	10	6	0	16
2	South Korea	10	3	3	16
3	Russia	7	8	9	24
4	Germany	7	7	8	22
5	Norway*	4	9	6	19
–	Mixed-NOCs	4	4	5	13
6	Switzerland	4	3	4	11
7	China	3	5	2	10
8	Canada	3	2	1	6
9	Sweden	3	2	0	5
10	Slovenia	3	0	2	5
11	Japan	2	4	0	6
12	Austria	2	3	5	10
13	France	2	1	3	6
14	Great Britain	2	0	2	4
15	Italy	1	2	6	9
16	Latvia	1	1	0	2
17	Romania	1	0	0	1
17	Ukraine	1	0	0	1
19	Australia	0	3	1	4
20	Czech Republic	0	2	2	4
21	Finland	0	1	5	6
22	Hungary	0	1	1	2
22	New Zealand	0	1	1	2
24	Belgium	0	1	0	1
24	Slovakia	0	1	0	1
26	Kazakhstan	0	0	2	2
27	Bulgaria	0	0	1	1
27	Netherlands	0	0	1	1
Totals (28 entries)		70	70	70	210

Source: IOC
