= Kazuki Yoshinaga =

Japanese speed skater (born 1999)

Personal information
- Nationality: Japanese
- Born: 31 July 1999 (age 27) Owariasahi, Japan
- Height: 1.73 m (5 ft 8 in)
- Weight: 63 kg (139 lb)

Sport
- Country: Japan
- Sport: Short-track speed skating
Medal record
Men's short-track speed skating
Representing Japan
World Championships
Bronze medal – third place	2018 Montréal	5000 m relay
Asian Games
Bronze medal – third place	2017 Sapporo	5000 m relay
Youth Olympic Games
Silver medal – second place	2016 Lillehammer	500 m
Representing Mixed-NOCs
Youth Olympic Games
Bronze medal – third place	2016 Lillehammer	Mixed team relay

Kazuki Yoshinaga (吉永 一貴, Yoshinaga Kazuki; born 31 July 1999) is a Japanese short-track speed skater. He competed in the 2018 Winter Olympics and the 2022 Winter Olympics.
