= Remi Lindholm =

Finnish cross-country skier

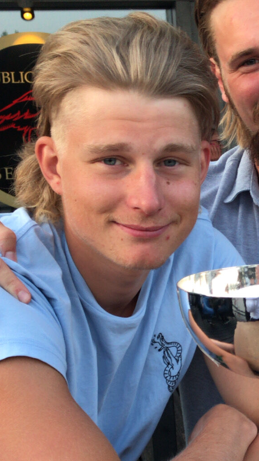
- Lindholm in 2021

Personal information
- Nationality: Finland
- Born: 17 January 1998 (age 28) Rovaniemi, Finland

Sport
- Sport: Skiing
- Club: Imatran Urheilijat

World Cup career
- Seasons: 3 – (2021–present)
- Indiv. starts: 21
- Indiv. podiums: 0
- Team starts: 3
- Team podiums: 0
- Overall titles: 0 – (53rd in 2023)
- Discipline titles: 0
- Updated on 29 March 2023

Remi Lindholm (born 17 January 1998) is a Finnish cross-country skier who competes internationally.

He represented his country at the 2022 Winter Olympics. During the 50 kilometre freestyle he suffered a frozen penis. This was the second time in his career that this happened.

== Cross-country skiing results ==
All results are sourced from the International Ski Federation (FIS).

=== Olympic Games ===
Year	Age	15 km individual	30 km skiathlon	50 km mass start	Sprint	4 × 10 km relay	Team sprint
2022	24	45	25	28^{[a]}	—	—	—

^{a} Distance reduced to 30 km due to weather conditions.

=== World Championships ===
Year	Age	15 km individual	30 km skiathlon	50 km mass start	Sprint	4 × 10 km relay	Team sprint
2023	25	32	22	-	—	—	—

=== World Cup ===
==== Season standings ====
Season	Age	Discipline standings				Ski Tour standings	
Season	Age	Overall	Distance	Sprint	U23	Nordic Opening	Tour de Ski
2021	23	125	78	—	24	—	—
2022	24	61	37	NC	—N/a	—N/a	36
2023	25	53	28	—	—N/a	—N/a	—
2024	26				—N/a	—N/a	21
