= Petra Jászapáti =

Hungarian short track speed skater

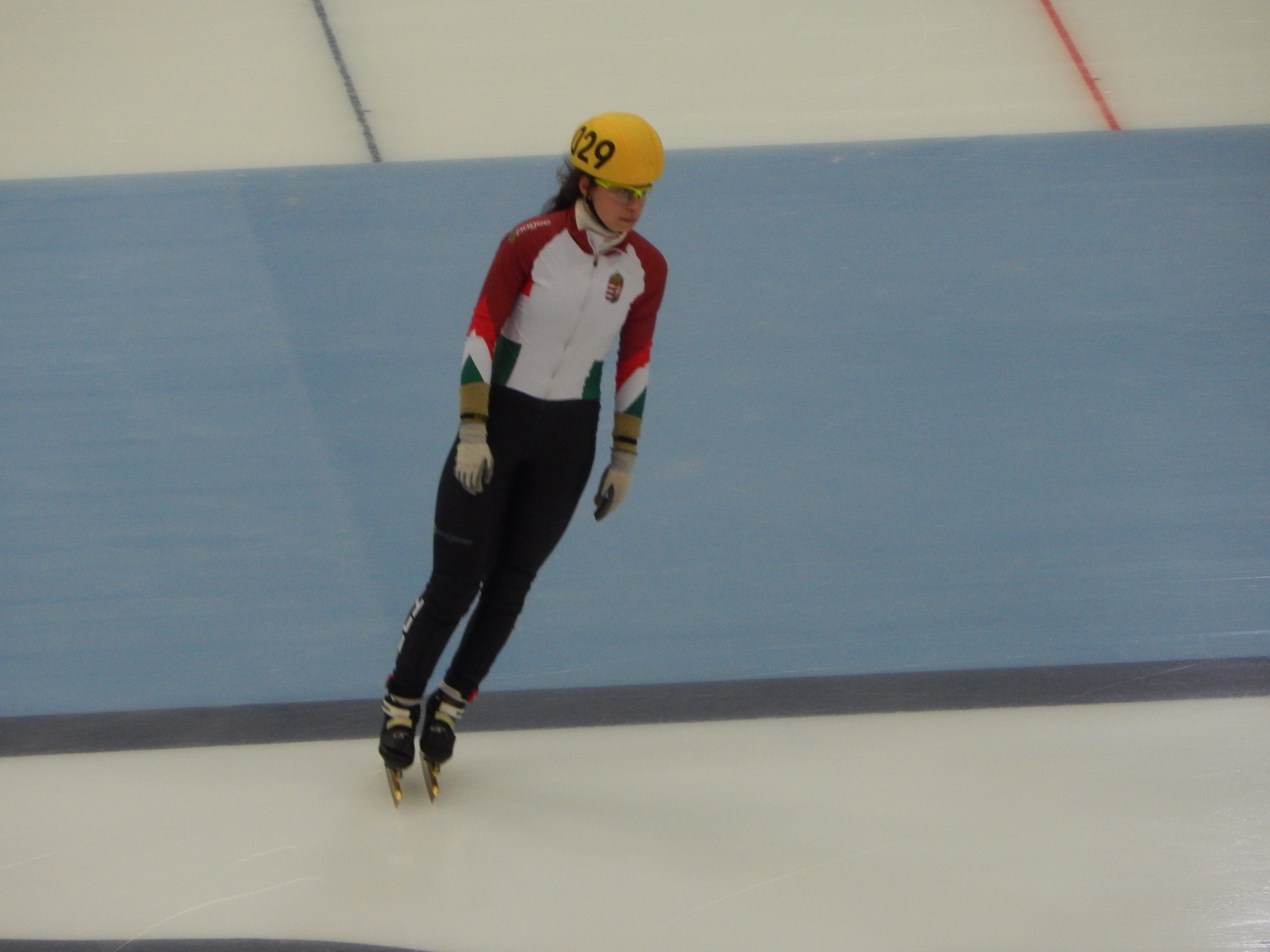
- Jászapáti in 2015

Personal information
- Nationality: Hungarian
- Born: 31 December 1998 (age 27) Szeged, Hungary

Sport
- Country: Hungary
- Sport: Short track speed skating
- Event: 500 metres
Medal record
Women's short-track speed skating
Representing Hungary
Olympic Games
Bronze medal – third place	2022 Beijing	2000 m mixed relay
World Championships
Silver medal – second place	2017 Rotterdam	3000 m relay
European Championships
Gold medal – first place	2025 Dresden	500 m
Silver medal – second place	2017 Turin	3000 m relay
Silver medal – second place	2018 Dresden	3000 m relay
Silver medal – second place	2023 Gdańsk	3000 m relay
Silver medal – second place	2025 Dresden	1000 m
Silver medal – second place	2025 Dresden	3000 m relay
Bronze medal – third place	2015 Dordrecht	3000 m relay
Bronze medal – third place	2019 Dordrecht	3000 m relay
Bronze medal – third place	2023 Gdańsk	1000 m
Youth Olympic Games
Silver medal – second place	2016 Lillehammer	500 m
Representing Mixed-NOCs
Youth Olympic Games
Silver medal – second place	2016 Lillehammer	Mixed team relay

Petra Jászapáti (born 31 December 1998) is a Hungarian short track speed skater. She competed in the women's 500 metres at the 2018 Winter Olympics. At the 2022 Winter Olympics, she won bronze as part of the team for the mixed 2000 metre relay event.
