= Kim Ji-yoo =

South Korean speed skater

Kim ji-yoo
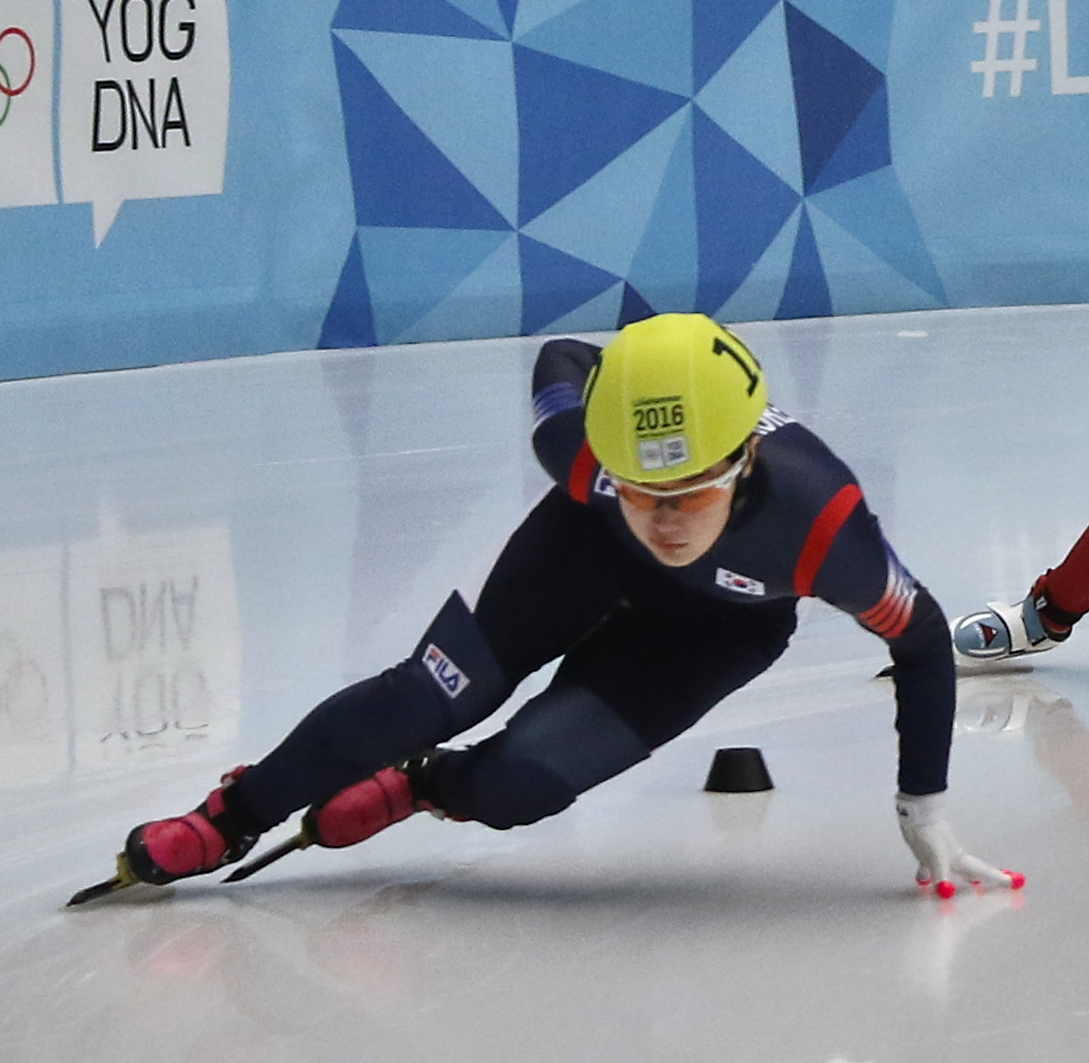
- Kim in 2016

Personal information
- Nationality: South Korean
- Born: 14 July 1999 (age 27) Seoul, South Korea

Sport
- Country: South Korea
- Sport: Short track speed skating
- Event: 3000 m
Medal record
Women's short-track speed skating
Representing South Korea
World Championships
Gold medal – first place	2019 Sofia	3000 m relay
Bronze medal – third place	2017 Rotterdam	500 m
Asian Winter Games
Gold medal – first place	2017 Sapporo	3000 m relay
Winter Youth Olympics
Gold medal – first place	2016 Lillehammer	1000 m
Representing Mixed-NOCs
Winter Youth Olympics
Gold medal – first place	2016 Lillehammer	Mixed team relay

Kim ji-yoo (born 14 July 1999) is a South Korean short track speed skater.

She participated at the 2019 World Short Track Speed Skating Championships, winning a medal.
