= Mateusz Haratyk =

Polish cross-country skier

Personal information
- Nationality: Poland
- Born: 27 May 1998 (age 28) Jaworzynka, Poland

Sport
- Sport: Skiing
- Club: NKS Trójwieś Beskidzka

World Cup career
- Seasons: 4 (2019–)
- Indiv. podiums: 0
- Overall titles: 0
- Discipline titles: 0

Mateusz Haratyk (born 27 May 1998) is a Polish cross-country skier. He competed in the 15 kilometre classical and the 30 kilometre skiathlon at the 2022 Winter Olympics.
