= Raimo Vīgants =

Latvian cross-country skier (born 1999)

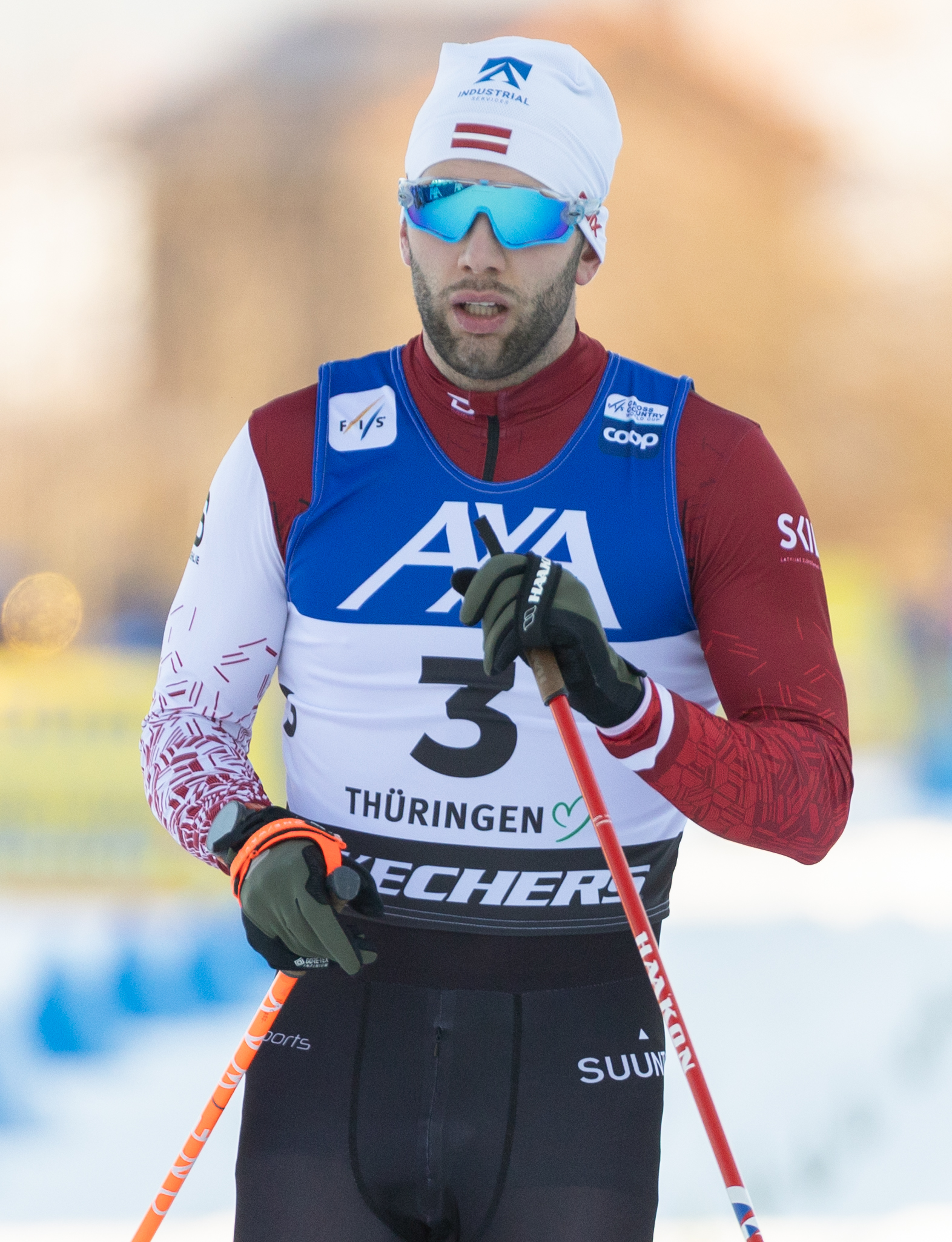

Personal information
- Nationality: Latvia
- Born: 25 February 1999 (age 27) Madona, Latvia

Sport
- Sport: Skiing
- Club: Madona

World Cup career
- Seasons: 4 – (2020–present)
- Indiv. starts: 25
- Indiv. podiums: 0
- Team starts: 2
- Team podiums: 0
- Overall titles: 0 – (168th in 2023)
- Discipline titles: 0
- Updated on 29 March 2023

Raimo Vīgants (born 25 February 1999) is a Latvian cross-country skier who competes internationally.

He represented Latvia at the 2022 Winter Olympics.

== Cross-country skiing results ==
All results are sourced from the International Ski Federation (FIS).

=== Olympic Games ===
Year	Age	15 km individual	30 km skiathlon	50 km mass start	Sprint	4 × 10 km relay	Team sprint
2022	23	62	52	44^{[a]}	20	—	21

^{a} Distance reduced to 30 km due to weather conditions.

=== World Championships ===
Year	Age	15 km individual	30 km skiathlon	50 km mass start	Sprint	4 × 10 km relay	Team sprint
2017	18	—	—	—	78	—	—
2019	20	—	—	—	71	—	—
2021	22	61	42	—	70	15	20
2023	24	64	59	—	—	14	17

=== World Cup ===
==== Season standings ====
Season	Age	Discipline standings				Ski Tour standings		
Season	Age	Overall	Distance	Sprint	U23	Nordic Opening	Tour de Ski	Ski Tour 2020
2020	21	NC	—	NC	NC	—	—	—
2021	22	NC	NC	NC	NC	—	DNF	—N/a
2022	23	NC	NC	NC	NC	—N/a	DNF	—N/a
2023	24	168	NC	101	—N/a	—N/a	—	—N/a
