= Anna Seidel (speed skater) =

German short track speed skater

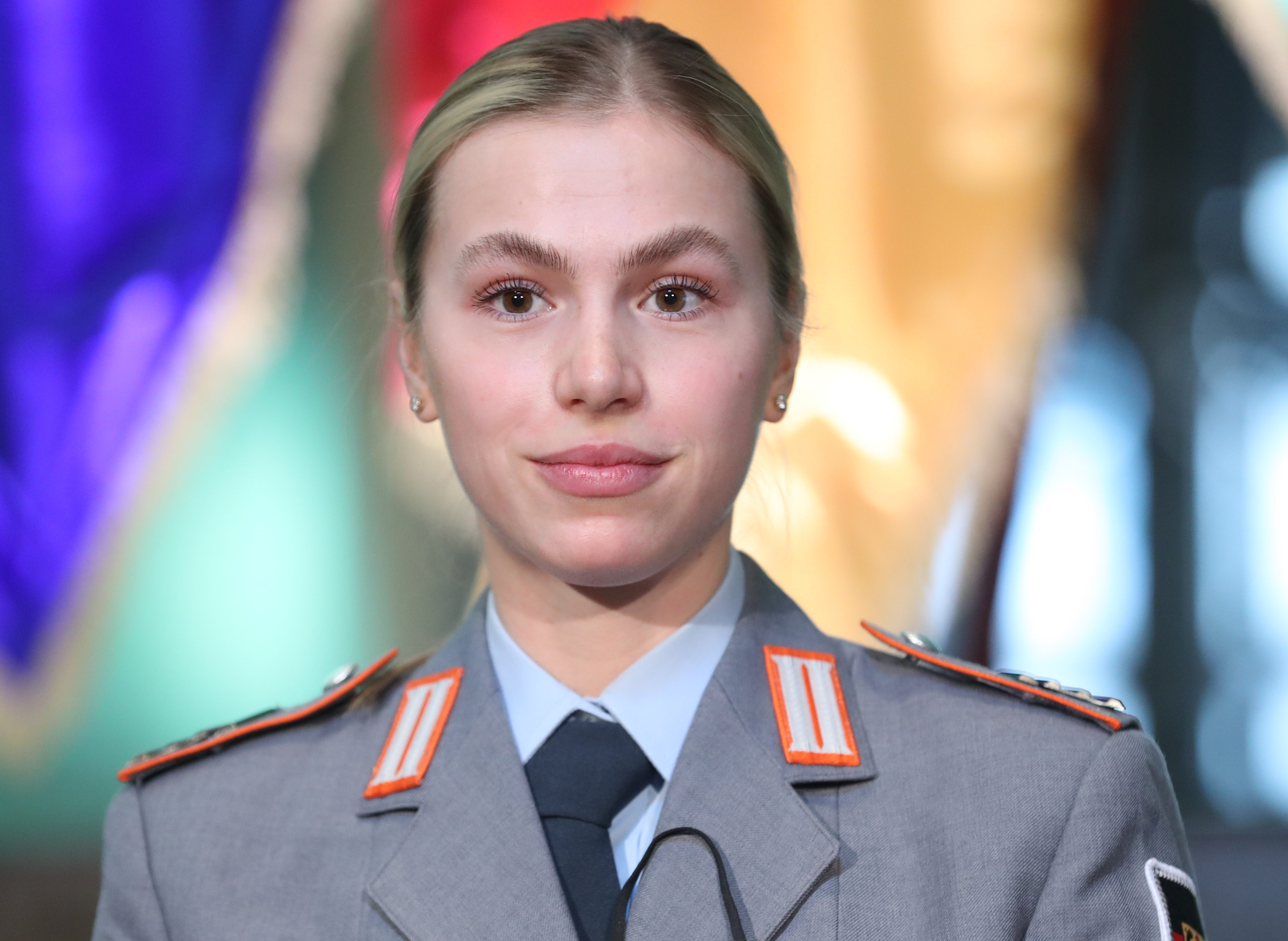
- Seidel in 2022

Personal information
- Born: 31 March 1998 (age 28) Dresden, Germany

Sport
- Country: Germany
- Sport: Short track speed skating
- Club: Eislaufverein Dresden e.V.
- Turned pro: 2013
- Retired: 2024

Achievements and titles
- Olympic finals: 2014 Sochi, 2018 Pyeongchang, 2022 Beijing
Medal record
Women's short-track speed skating
Representing Germany
European Championships
Silver medal – second place	2021 Gdansk	Overall
Silver medal – second place	2021 Gdansk	1500 m
Bronze medal – third place	2016 Sochi	1000 m
Bronze medal – third place	2018 Dresden	1000 m
Bronze medal – third place	2020 Debrecen	1500 m
Bronze medal – third place	2021 Gdansk	1000 m
Bronze medal – third place	2023 Gdańsk	1500 m
Youth Olympic Games
Bronze medal – third place	2016 Lillehammer	1000 m

Anna Seidel (born 31 March 1998) is a retired German short track speed skater. At the ISU World Cup in Kolomna, Russia, in November 2013, Seidel placed 6th in the A Final of the 1500m event, thereby qualifying for the 2014 Winter Olympics in Sochi, where she was the only woman to represent Germany in short track. She was officially nominated by the DOSB (German Olympic Committee) on December 18, 2013.

Anna Seidel started her sport carrier in athletics. At the age of 9, she started her first short track practice, and in the year 2007, she took part in her first junior competition. She got more success within the following years and ranked 3rd at Europe Cup in March 2013. She finished 40th (of 67) at the Junior World Championship 2013 in Warsaw, which allowed her to be qualified to Short Track World Cup. Following sport achievements brought Anna Seidel to 2014 Olympic Games where she showed her personal best time in 1500m — 2:20.405min.

In December 2013, Anna Seidel became an official nominee to join the German Olympic movement and the second youngest member of German Olympic Team after Gianina Ernst. In March 2024, Seidel announced her retirement from speed skating via her instagram account stating. ″I have always been someone who was interested in many things outside of sports and sometimes felt like I was missing out. My career was unfortunately marked by some injuries that could have ended worse, and I have always been lucky not to have serious lasting damage. I was incredibly happy to qualify for the 2022 Olympics again after my leg fracture, but at the same time, I was exhausted from all the rehabilitation processes.″
