= Freestyle skiing at the Winter Youth Olympics =

- Governing body: FIS
- Events: 12 (men: 5; womens: 5; mixed: 2)

Games
- 2012; 2016; 2020; 2024

Freestyle skiing is one of the sports featured at the Winter Youth Olympics. In 2012 it included the disciplines of half pipe and ski cross. In 2016, slopestyle was added, also 1 mixed event was held together with snowboarders.

== Medalists by Games ==
=== 2012 Winter Youth Olympics ===
Event	Gold		Silver		Bronze	
Boys' halfpipe	Kai Mahler; Switzerland	95.00	Lauri Kivari; Finland	90.00	Aaron Blunck; United States	87.50
Boys' ski cross	Niki Lehikoinen; Finland	56.15	Marzellus Renn; Germany	56.96	Matty Herauf; Canada	57.34
Girls' halfpipe	Elisabeth Gram; Austria	84.75	Tiril Sjastad Christiansen; Norway	79.25	Marine Tripier Mondancin; France	69.50
Girls' ski cross	Michaela Heider; Austria	58.38	Veronika Camkova; Czech Republic	58.63	Emilie Benz; Switzerland	58.82

=== 2016 Winter Youth Olympics ===
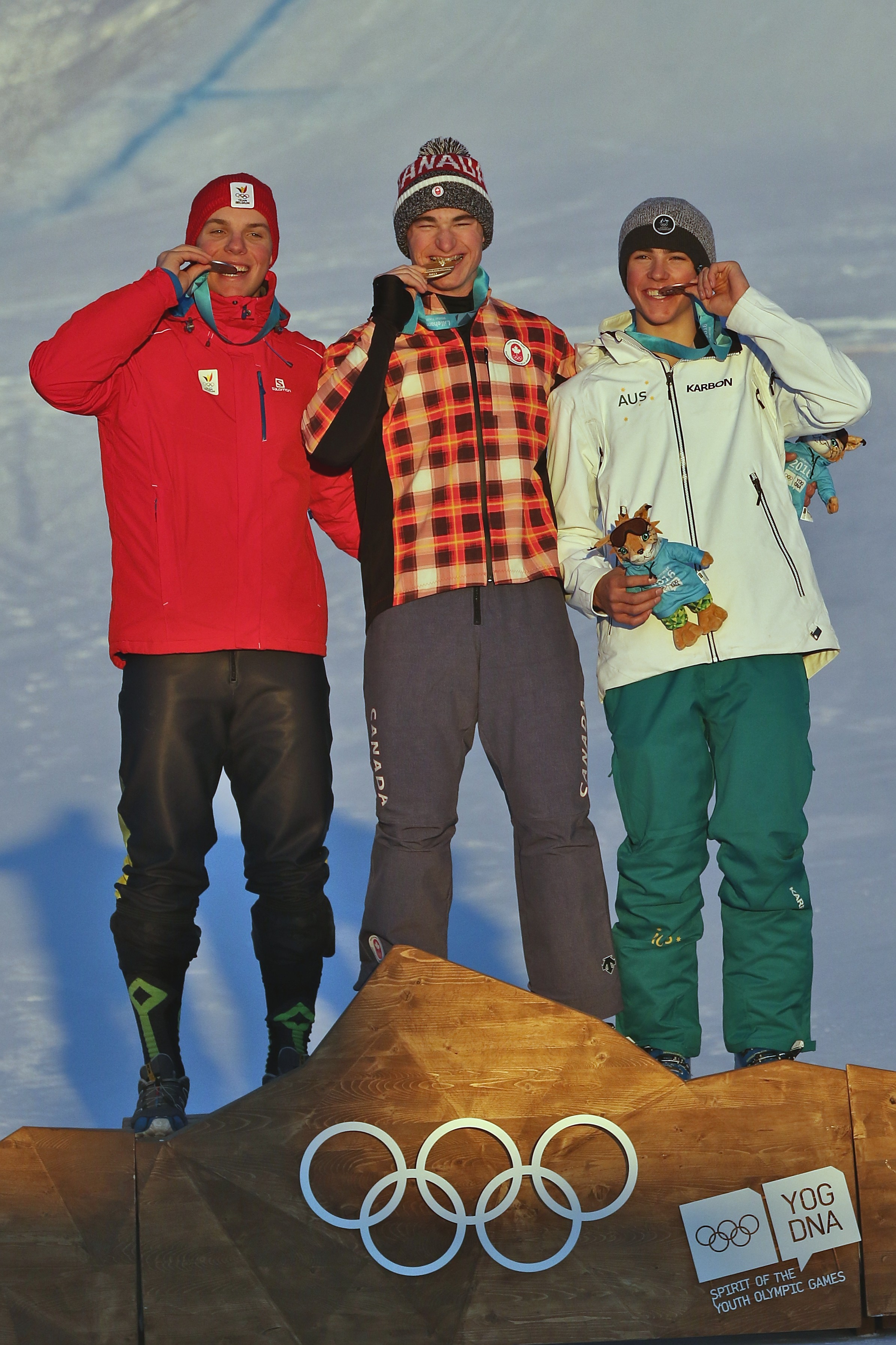
Boys ski cross medalists 2016

Event	Gold		Silver		Bronze	
Boys' halfpipe	Birk Irving; United States	93.00	Finn Bilous; New Zealand	92.20	Trym Sunde Andreassen; Norway	80.20
Boys' slopestyle	Birk Ruud; Norway	89.20	Alexander Hall; United States	87.40	Finn Bilous; New Zealand	86.00
Boys' ski cross	Reece Howden; Canada		Xander Vercammen; Belgium		Louis Muhlen; Australia	
Girls' halfpipe	Madison Rowlands; Great Britain	88.60	Paula Cooper; United States	79.00	Lara Wolf; Austria	74.20
Girls' slopestyle	Lana Prusakova; Russia	77.00	Lou Barin; France	72.80	Madison Rowlands; Great Britain	67.80
Girls' ski cross	Talina Gantenbein; Switzerland		Zali Offord; Australia		Klára Kašparová; Czech Republic	

=== 2020 Winter Youth Olympics ===
Event	Gold		Silver		Bronze	
Boys' big air	Matěj Švancer; Czech Republic	186.00	Kiernan Fagan; United States	183.00	Orest Kovalenko; Ukraine	179.50
Boys' halfpipe	Andrew Longino; Canada	94.00	Hunter Carey; United States	86.00	Luca Harrington; New Zealand	80.66
Boys' slopestyle	Kiernan Fagan; United States	90.66	Melvin Morén; Sweden	89.33	Hunter Henderson; United States	88.66
Boys' ski cross	Erik Wahlberg; Sweden		Artem Bazhin; Russia		Andrei Gorbachev; Russia	
Girls' big air	Gu Ailing; China	171.25	Kirsty Muir; Great Britain	170.00	Jennie-Lee Burmansson; Sweden	151.75
Girls' halfpipe	Gu Ailing; China	93.00	Li Fanghui; China	85.66	Hanna Faulhaber; United States	77.33
Girls' slopestyle	Kelly Sildaru; Estonia	93.75	Gu Ailing; China	93.25	Jennie-Lee Burmansson; Sweden	90.00
Girls' ski cross	Marie Krista; Switzerland		Diana Cholenská; Czech Republic		Vladislava Baliukina; Russia	

=== 2024 Winter Youth Olympics ===
Event	Gold		Silver		Bronze	
Men's big air	Charlie Beatty; Canada	177.75	Olly Nicholls; Japan	174.50	Luke Harrold; New Zealand	172.25
Men's halfpipe	Luke Harrold; New Zealand	94.25	Finley Melville Ives; New Zealand	92.50	Alan Bornet; Switzerland	85.00
Men's slopestyle	Henry Townshend; United States	90.25	Olly Nicholls; Japan	85.75	Jaakko Koskinen; Finland	83.75
Men's dual moguls	Lee Yoon-seung; South Korea		Porter Huff; United States		Takuto Nakamura; Japan	
Men's ski cross	Niklas Höller; Germany		Janik Sommerer; Austria		Måns Abersten; Sweden	
Women's big air	Flora Tabanelli; Italy	180.00	Daisy Thomas; Australia	172.75	Muriel Mohr; Germany	166.00
Women's halfpipe	Liu Yishan; China	92.25	Chen Zihan; China	83.75	Kate Gray; United States	79.25
Women's slopestyle	Flora Tabanelli; Italy	90.50	Han Linshan; China	81.50	Muriel Mohr; Germany	78.75
Women's dual moguls	Elizabeth Lemley; United States		Lottie Lodge; Australia		Abby McLarnon; United States	
Women's ski cross	Uma Kruse Een; Sweden		Morgan Shute; United States		Leena Thommen; Switzerland	
Mixed team dual moguls	United States; Elizabeth Lemley; Porter Huff		South Korea; Yun Shin-ee; Lee Yoon-seung		United States; Abby McLarnon; Jiah Cohen	
Mixed team ski cross	Sweden; William Young Shing; Alexandra Nilsson		United States; Walker Robinson; Morgan Shute		Switzerland; Lorenzo Rosset; Valentine Lagger	

== Medal table ==
As of the 2024 Winter Youth Olympics.

Rank	Nation	Gold	Silver	Bronze	Total
1	United States	5	7	6	18
2	China	3	4	0	7
3	Sweden	3	1	3	7
4	Switzerland	3	0	4	7
5	Canada	3	0	1	4
6	Austria	2	1	1	4
7	Italy	2	0	0	2
8	New Zealand	1	2	3	6
9	Czech Republic	1	2	1	4
10	Germany	1	1	2	4
10	Russia	1	1	2	4
12	Finland	1	1	1	3
12	Great Britain	1	1	1	3
12	Norway	1	1	1	3
15	South Korea	1	1	0	2
16	Estonia	1	0	0	1
17	Australia	0	3	1	4
18	Japan	0	2	1	3
19	France	0	1	1	2
20	Belgium	0	1	0	1
21	Ukraine	0	0	1	1
Totals (21 entries)		30	30	30	90

== See also ==
- Freestyle skiing at the Winter Olympics
