= Freestyle skiing at the 2016 Winter Youth Olympics =

Freestyle Skiing at the II Winter Youth Olympic Games
- Venue: Hafjell Freepark and Oslo Vinterpark
- Dates: 14–19 February
- Competitors: 67 from 24 nations

Freestyle skiing at the 2016 Winter Youth Olympics was held at the Hafjell Freepark and Oslo Vinterpark from 14 to 19 February. Besides 6 freestyle skiing events, 1 mixed event was held together with snowboarders.

== Medal summary ==
=== Medal table ===
* Host nation (Norway)

Rank	Nation	Gold	Silver	Bronze	Total
1	United States	1	2	0	3
2	Great Britain	1	0	1	2
2	Norway*	1	0	1	2
4	Canada	1	0	0	1
4	Russia	1	0	0	1
4	Switzerland	1	0	0	1
7	Australia	0	1	1	2
7	New Zealand	0	1	1	2
9	Belgium	0	1	0	1
9	France	0	1	0	1
11	Austria	0	0	1	1
11	Czech Republic	0	0	1	1
Totals (12 entries)		6	6	6	18

=== Boys' events ===
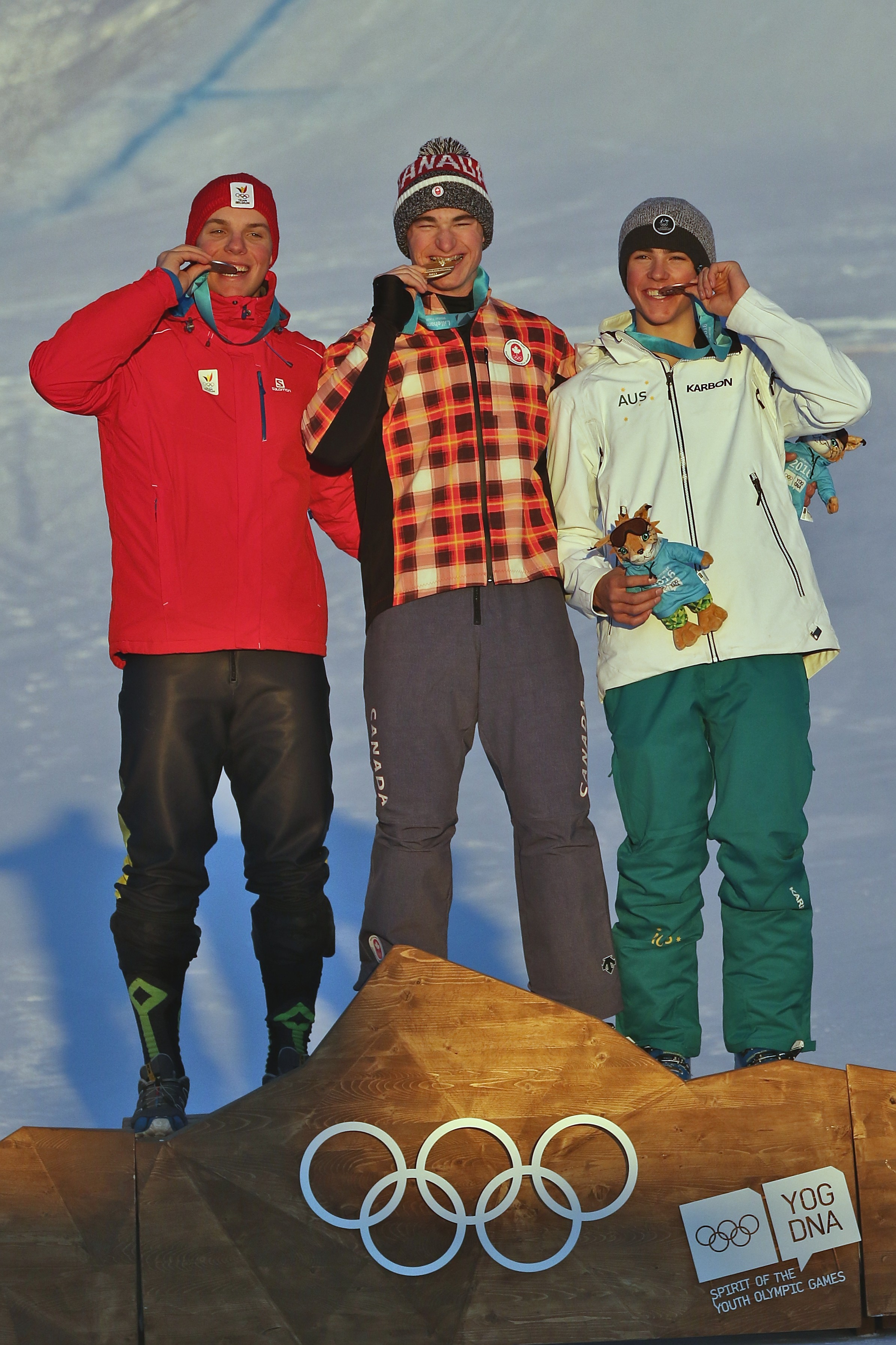
Boys ski cross medalists

Event	Gold		Silver		Bronze	
Boys' halfpipe	Birk Irving; United States	93.00	Finn Bilous; New Zealand	92.20	Trym Sunde Andreassen; Norway	80.20
Boys' slopestyle	Birk Ruud; Norway	89.20	Alexander Hall; United States	87.40	Finn Bilous; New Zealand	86.00
Boys' ski cross	Reece Howden; Canada		Xander Vercammen; Belgium		Louis Muhlen; Australia	

=== Girls' events ===
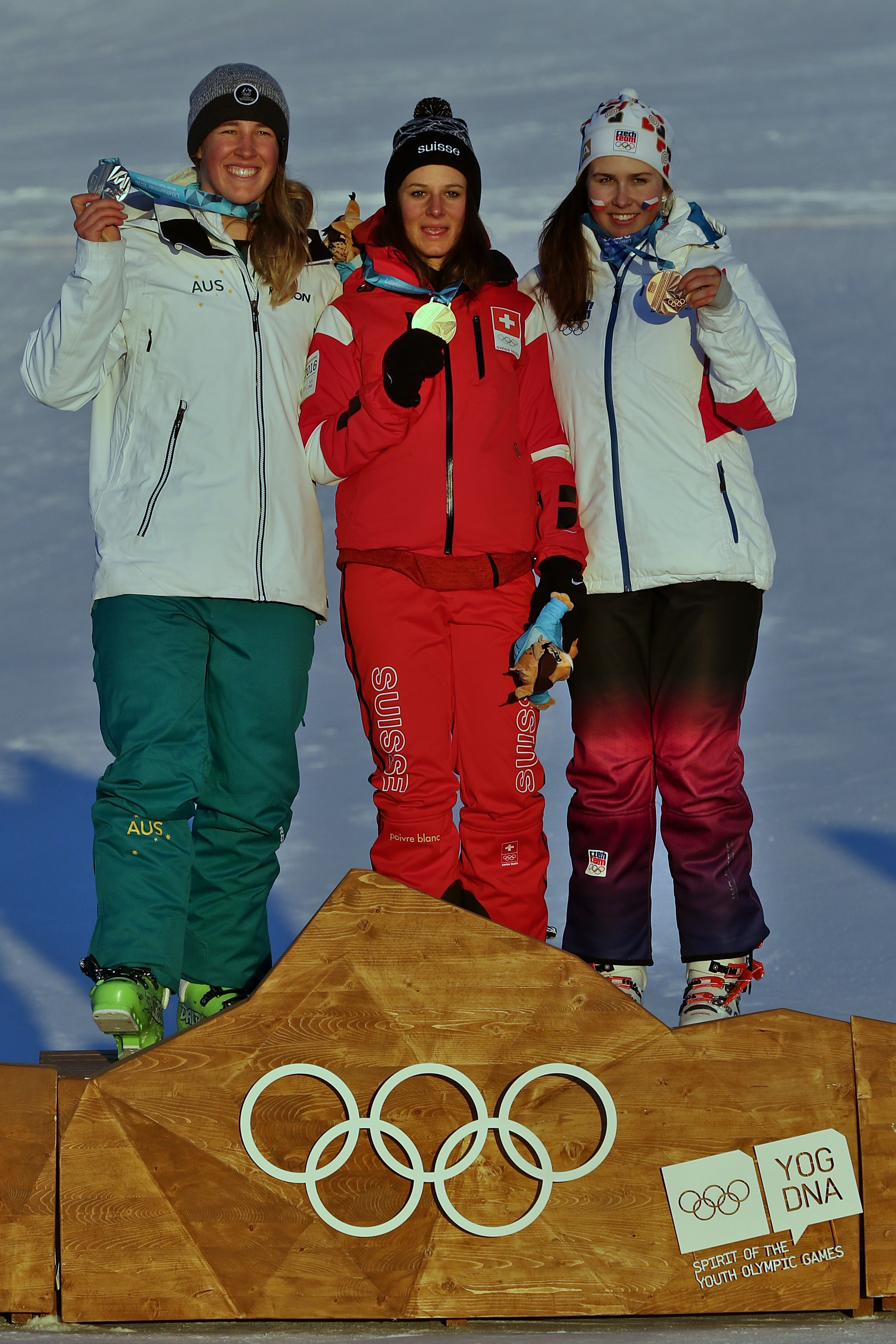
Girls ski cross medalists

Event	Gold		Silver		Bronze	
Girls' halfpipe	Madison Rowlands; Great Britain	88.60	Paula Cooper; United States	79.00	Lara Wolf; Austria	74.20
Girls' slopestyle	Lana Prusakova; Russia	77.00	Lou Barin; France	72.80	Madison Rowlands; Great Britain	67.80
Girls' ski cross	Talina Gantenbein; Switzerland		Zali Offord; Australia		Klára Kašparová; Czech Republic	

== Qualification system ==
All quotas were distributed using the results of the 2015 World Junior Championships. Each nation was allowed to enter one athlete per event. The total quota was 80 athletes (32 in ski cross, 24 in slopestyle and 24 in halfpipe).

=== Summary ===
NOC	Boys'			Girls'			Total	
NOC	Halfpipe	Slopestyle	Ski cross	Halfpipe	Slopestyle	Ski cross	Quotas	Athletes
Argentina					1		1	1
Australia	1	1	2			1	5	4
Austria	1	2	1	1	1	1	7	5
Belgium			1				1	1
Canada	1		1	1		1	4	4
Chile		1	1			1	3	3
Czech Republic						1	1	1
Denmark						1	1	1
Finland		1			1	1	3	3
France		1	1		1	1	4	4
Germany		1	1			1	3	3
Great Britain		1		1	1	1	4	3
Hungary			1				1	1
Italy			1		1		2	2
Kazakhstan			1			1	2	2
Mexico			1				1	1
New Zealand	1	2					3	2
Norway	1	2	1		1	1	6	5
Russia	1		1	1	1	1	5	4
Slovenia	1	1	1				3	2
South Korea	1	1					2	1
Sweden		1	1			1	3	3
Switzerland	1	2	1		1	1	6	5
United States	2	2	1	2	1	1	9	6
Total: 24 NOCs	11	19	18	6	10	16	80	67
