= Freestyle skiing at the 2016 Winter Youth Olympics – Boys' halfpipe =

Boys' halfpipe at the II Winter Youth Olympic Games
- Venue: Oslo Vinterpark
- Dates: 14 February
- Competitors: 11 from 10 nations
- Winning points: 93.00

Medalists
1st place, gold medalist(s)		Birk Irving	United States
2nd place, silver medalist(s)		Finn Bilous	New Zealand
3rd place, bronze medalist(s)		Trym Sunde Andreassen	Norway

The boys' halfpipe event at the 2016 Winter Youth Olympics took place on 14 February at the Oslo Vinterpark.

== Results ==
Rank	Order	Athlete	Country	Run 1	Run 2	Run 3	Best
1st place, gold medalist(s)	8	Birk Irving	United States	84.80	93.00	DNS	93.00
2nd place, silver medalist(s)	11	Finn Bilous	New Zealand	89.60	90.80	92.20	92.20
3rd place, bronze medalist(s)	10	Trym Sunde Andreassen	Norway	80.20	30.00	52.40	80.20
4	9	Alexander Hall	United States	75.80	12.20	78.00	78.00
5	5	Marco Ladner	Austria	41.80	43.60	67.60	67.60
6	1	Mario Grob	Switzerland	51.60	64.00	35.20	64.00
7	6	Evan Marineau	Canada	59.40	17.60	24.20	59.40
8	7	Vladimir Galaiko	Russia	48.20	27.40	55.40	55.40
9	3	Cameron Waddell	Australia	45.80	27.60	18.20	45.80
10	4	Lee Kang-bok	South Korea	37.40	35.20	9.60	37.40
11	2	Maksimiljan Blažon	Slovenia	32.40	32.40	34.00	34.00
