= United States at the 2016 Winter Youth Olympics =

- Flag of the United States
- IOC code: USA
- NOC: United States Olympic Committee
- Website: www.teamusa.org

in Lillehammer
- Competitors: 62 in 15 sports
- Flag bearer: Chloe Kim
- Medals Ranked 1st: Gold 10 Silver 6 Bronze 0 Total 16

Winter Youth Olympics appearances (overview)
- 2012; 2016; 2020; 2024

The United States competed at the 2016 Winter Youth Olympics in Lillehammer, Norway, from 12 to 21 February 2016.

== Medalists ==
Medal	Name	Sport	Event	Date
Gold	River Radamus	Alpine skiing	Boys' super-G	13 February
Gold	River Radamus	Alpine Skiing	Boys' combined	14 February
Gold	Birk Irving	Freestyle skiing	Boys' halfpipe	14 February
Gold	Chloe Kim	Snowboarding	Girls' Halfpipe	14 February
Gold	Jake Pates	Snowboarding	Boys' halfpipe	14 February
Gold	Jake Vedder	Snowboarding	Boys' snowboard cross	15 February
Gold	River Radamus	Alpine skiing	Boys' giant slalom	17 February
Gold	Chloe Kim	Snowboarding	Girls' slopestyle	19 February
Gold	Jake Pates	Snowboarding	Boys' slopestyle	19 February
Gold	United States men's national under-16 ice hockey team: Jack DeBoer; Drew DeRidder; Ty Emberson; Jonathan Gruden; Christian Krygier; Will MacKinnon; Erik Middendorf; Jacob Pivonka; Adam Samuelsson; Mattias Samuelsson; Ryan Savage; Todd Scott; Jacob Semik; Oliver Wahlstrom; T. J. Walsh; Tyler Weiss; Jake Wise	Ice hockey	Boys' tournament	21 February
Silver	Nikolas Baden	Snowboarding	Boys' halfpipe	14 February
Silver	Paula Cooper	Freestyle skiing	Girls' halfpipe	14 February
Silver	Ben Loomis	Nordic combined	Normal hill/5 km	16 February
Silver	Chloe Lewis; Logan Bye	Figure skating	Ice dancing	16 February
Silver	Luc Violette; Cora Farrell; Ben Richardson; Cait Flannery	Curling	Mixed Team	17 February
Silver	Alexander Hall	Freestyle skiing	Boys' slopestyle	19 February

=== Medalists in mixed NOCs events ===
Medal	Name	Sport	Event	Date
Gold	Sarah Rose; Joseph Goodpaster	Figure skating	Team trophy	20 February
Silver	Austin Kleba	Speed skating	Mixed team sprint	17 February

== Alpine Skiing ==
Boys

Athlete	Event	Run 1		Run 2		Total	
Athlete	Event	Time	Rank	Time	Rank	Time	Rank
River Radamus	Slalom	DNF		did not advance			
River Radamus	Giant slalom	1:17.16	1	1:17.89	3	2:35.05	1st place, gold medalist(s)
River Radamus	Super-G	—N/a				1:10.62	1st place, gold medalist(s)
River Radamus	Combined	1:11.15	1	41.72	7	1:52.87	1st place, gold medalist(s)

Girls

Athlete	Event	Run 1		Run 2		Total	
Athlete	Event	Time	Rank	Time	Rank	Time	Rank
Keely Cashman	Slalom	57.10	11	53.58	15	1:50.68	13
Keely Cashman	Giant slalom	1:22.21	15	1:18.50	14	2:40.71	14
Keely Cashman	Super-G	—N/a				1:14.52	10
Keely Cashman	Combined	1:15.75	11	did not finish			

Parallel mixed team

Athletes	Event	Round of 16	Quarterfinals	Semifinals	Final / BM	
Athletes	Event	Opposition Score	Opposition Score	Opposition Score	Opposition Score	Rank
Keely Cashman; River Radamus	Parallel mixed team	Canada; L 2 - 2^{+}	did not advance			

== Biathlon ==
Boys

Athlete	Event	Time	Misses	Rank
Vaclav Cervenka	Sprint	21:52.2	4	36
Vaclav Cervenka	Pursuit	32:04.9	1	20
Eli Nielsen	Sprint	22:59.6	6	46
Eli Nielsen	Pursuit	36:24.1	6	45

Girls

Athlete	Event	Time	Misses	Rank
Amanda Kautzer	Sprint	19:22.4	2	10
Amanda Kautzer	Pursuit	29:17.1	8	27
Chloe Levins	Sprint	19:56.6	2	22
Chloe Levins	Pursuit	25:47.6	0	4

Mixed

Athletes	Event	Time	Misses	Rank
Chloe Levins; Vaclav Cervenka	Single mixed relay	42:29.2	1+8	6
Chloe Levins; Amanda Kautzer; Eli Nielsen; Vaclav Cervenka	Mixed relay	1:24:56.2	3+12	7

== Bobsleigh ==
Athlete	Event	Run 1		Run 2		Total	
Athlete	Event	Time	Rank	Time	Rank	Time	Rank
Samuel Beach	Boys'	59.02	14	59.32	15	1:58.34	14

== Cross-country skiing ==
Boys

Athlete	Event	Qualification		Quarterfinal		Semifinal		Final	
Athlete	Event	Time	Rank	Time	Rank	Time	Rank	Time	Rank
Hunter Wonders	10 km freestyle	—N/a						24:48.5	8
Hunter Wonders	Classical sprint	3:13.15	29 Q	3:04.65	3	did not advance			
Hunter Wonders	Cross-country cross	3:19.42	30 Q	—N/a		3:12.18	9	did not advance	

Girls

Athlete	Event	Qualification		Quarterfinal		Semifinal		Final	
Athlete	Event	Time	Rank	Time	Rank	Time	Rank	Time	Rank
Hannah Halvorsen	5 km freestyle	—N/a						14:13.8	17
Hannah Halvorsen	Classical sprint	3:38.73	13 Q	3:28.40	1 Q	3:28.77	3 q	3:33.20	6
Hannah Halvorsen	Cross-country cross	3:44.04	10 Q	—N/a		3:39.91	5	did not advance	

== Curling ==
=== Mixed team ===
Team

- Skip: Luc Violette
- Third: Cora Farrell
- Second: Ben Richardson
- Lead: Cait Flannery

Round Robin

Group A	Skip	W	L
United States	Luc Violette	6	1
Switzerland	Selina Witschonke	6	1
Russia	Nadezhda Karelina	6	1
Turkey	Oğuzhan Karakurt	3	4
Italy	Luca Rizzolli	3	4
China	Du Hongrui	2	5
New Zealand	Matthew Neilson	1	6
Japan	Kota Ito	1	6

Draw 1

Sheet C	1	2	3	4	5	6	7	8	Final
Turkey (Karakurt)	0	0	0	2	0	0	1	X	3
United States (Violette) 🔨	1	0	1	0	2	3	0	X	7

Draw 2

Sheet A	1	2	3	4	5	6	7	8	Final
United States (Violette) 🔨	0	0	2	0	2	0	0	2	6
Switzerland (Witschonke)	0	1	0	1	0	3	0	0	5

Draw 3

Sheet D	1	2	3	4	5	6	7	8	Final
Italy (Rizzolli)	0	0	1	0	2	0	2	0	5
United States (Violette) 🔨	2	2	0	1	0	2	0	1	8

Draw 4

Sheet A	1	2	3	4	5	6	7	8	Final
Russia (Karelina)	0	1	3	1	0	3	0	1	9
United States (Violette) 🔨	1	0	0	0	2	0	3	0	6

Draw 5

Sheet B	1	2	3	4	5	6	7	8	Final
New Zealand (Neilson)	2	0	0	0	1	0	0	X	3
United States (Violette) 🔨	0	2	1	3	0	2	2	X	10

Draw 6

Sheet D	1	2	3	4	5	6	7	8	Final
United States (Violette) 🔨	2	1	1	0	0	1	0	X	5
China (Du)	0	0	0	1	0	0	1	X	2

Draw 7

Sheet B	1	2	3	4	5	6	7	8	Final
United States (Violette) 🔨	2	0	0	1	0	5	1	X	9
Japan (Ito)	0	0	1	0	2	0	0	X	3

Quarterfinals

Sheet C	1	2	3	4	5	6	7	8	9	Final
United States (Violette) 🔨	0	0	0	1	1	0	2	0	1	5
Norway (Ramsfjell)	0	0	2	0	0	1	0	1	0	4

Semifinals

Sheet D	1	2	3	4	5	6	7	8	Final
United States (Violette)	0	2	3	0	0	2	1	0	8
Russia (Karelina) 🔨	2	0	0	3	0	0	0	1	6

Gold Medal Game

Sheet C	1	2	3	4	5	6	7	8	Final
Canada (Fay) 🔨	5	0	2	0	2	0	1	X	10
United States (Violette)	0	2	0	1	0	1	0	X	4

Final Rank: (silver)

=== Mixed doubles ===
Athletes	Event	Round of 32	Round of 16	Quarterfinals	Semifinals	Final / BM	
Athletes	Event	Opposition Result	Opposition Result	Opposition Result	Opposition Result	Opposition Result	Rank
Giovanna Barros (BRA); Ben Richardson (USA)	Mixed doubles	Jonasson (SWE); Du (CHN); W 8–4	Ramsfjell (NOR); Kim (KOR); L 7–9	did not advance			
Britta Sillaots (EST); Luc Violette (USA)	Mixed doubles	Petterson (SWE); Zisa (ITA); W 7–4	Matsuzawa (JPN); Hösli (SUI); L 5–10	did not advance			
Cait Flannery (USA); Kota Ito (JPN)	Mixed doubles	Podrábská (CZE); Degerfeldt (SWE); L 7–8	did not advance				
Cora Farrell (USA); Ben Smith (NZL)	Mixed doubles	Lee (KOR); Nygren (SWE); L 1–8	did not advance				

==== Round of 32 ====
Sheet D	1	2	3	4	5	6	7	8	Final
Jenny Jonasson (SWE); Du Hongrui (CHN) 🔨	0	0	0	3	0	0	1	X	4
Giovanna Barros (BRA); Ben Richardson (USA)	2	1	1	0	2	2	0	X	8

Sheet D	1	2	3	4	5	6	7	8	Final
Kristina Podrábská (CZE); Anton Degerfeldt (SWE)	2	1	1	0	1	1	0	2	8
Cait Flannery (USA); Kota Ito (JPN)	0	0	0	4	0	0	3	0	7

Sheet D	1	2	3	4	5	6	7	8	Final
Lee (KOR); Johan Nygren (SWE)	2	1	1	1	3	0	X	X	8
Cora Farrell (USA); Ben Smith (NZL)	0	0	0	0	0	1	X	X	1

Sheet D	1	2	3	4	5	6	7	8	Final
Tova Pettersson (SWE); Alberto Zisa (ITA)	1	0	2	1	0	0	0	X	4
Britta Sillaots (EST); Luc Violette (USA) 🔨	0	3	0	0	1	1	2	X	7

==== Round of 16 ====
Sheet A	1	2	3	4	5	6	7	8	Final
Maia Ramsfjell (NOR); Kim Ho-geon (KOR) 🔨	0	0	4	1	0	2	2	X	9
Giovanna Barros (BRA); Ben Richardson (USA)	1	2	0	0	4	0	0	X	7

Sheet B	1	2	3	4	5	6	7	8	Final
Yako Matsuzawa (JPN); Philipp Hösli (SUI) 🔨	0	1	0	0	4	0	5	X	10
Britta Sillaots (EST); Luc Violette (USA)	1	0	0	1	0	3	0	X	5

== Figure skating ==
Singles

Athlete	Event	SP		FS		Total	
Athlete	Event	Points	Rank	Points	Rank	Points	Rank
Camden Pulkinen	Boys' singles	57.91	7	108.68	8	166.59	7
Vanna Giang	Girls' singles	48.14	10	87.51	7	135.65	8

Couples

Athletes	Event	SP/SD		FS/FD		Total	
Athletes	Event	Points	Rank	Points	Rank	Points	Rank
Sarah Rose; Joseph Goodpaster	Pairs	46.47	5	80.06	6	126.53	6
Chloe Lewis; Logan Bye	Ice dancing	55.07	3	81.30	2	136.37	2nd place, silver medalist(s)

Mixed NOC team trophy

Athletes	Event	Free skate/Free dance					
Athletes	Event	Ice dance	Pairs	Girls	Boys	Total	
Athletes	Event	Points Team points	Points Team points	Points Team points	Points Team points	Points	Rank
Team Desire; Anastasia Skoptsova / Kirill Aleshin (RUS); Sarah Rose / Joseph Goodpaster (USA); Li Xiangning (CHN); Dmitri Aliev (RUS)	Team trophy	80.28; 7	82.47; 4	88.73; 5	141.06; 7	23	1st place, gold medalist(s)

== Freestyle skiing ==
Halfpipe

Athlete	Event	Final				
Athlete	Event	Run 1	Run 2	Run 3	Best	Rank
Alexander Hall	Boys' halfpipe	75.80	12.20	78.00	78.00	4
Birk Irving	Boys' halfpipe	84.80	93.00	DNS	93.00	1st place, gold medalist(s)
Paula Cooper	Girls' halfpipe	72.60	79.00	34.40	79.00	2nd place, silver medalist(s)
Nikita Rubocki	Girls' halfpipe	68.40	70.20	58.80	70.20	4

Ski cross

Athlete	Event	Qualification		Group heats		Semifinal	Final
Athlete	Event	Time	Rank	Points	Rank	Position	Position
Russell Malm	Boys' ski cross	44.62	9 Q	7	14	did not advance	
Abigail Zagnoli	Girls' ski cross	47.85	11	12	9	did not advance	

Slopestyle

Athlete	Event	Final			
Athlete	Event	Run 1	Run 2	Best	Rank
Alexander Hall	Boys' slopestyle	83.40	87.40	87.40	2nd place, silver medalist(s)
Birk Irving	Boys' slopestyle	did not start			
Nikita Rubocki	Girls' slopestyle	50.60	41.40	50.60	8

== Ice hockey ==
The United States sent one boys' ice hockey team consisting of 17 athletes.

=== Boys' tournament ===
The team roster is listed as follows:

No.	Pos.	2016 Winter Youth Olympics United States U-16 boys' ice hockey team roster	Height	Weight	Birthdate	Hometown	Current Team
1	G	Drew DeRidder	178 cm (5 ft 10 in)	66 kg (146 lb)	1 May 2000	Fenton, Michigan	Oakland Jr. Grizzlies (T1EHL)
30	G	Todd Scott	180 cm (5 ft 11 in)	86 kg (190 lb)	23 May 2000	Albertville, Minnesota	Omaha AAA Hockey Club (NAPHL)
7	D	Ty Emberson – A	185 cm (6 ft 1 in)	86 kg (190 lb)	23 May 2000	Eau Claire, Wisconsin	Memorial High School (WIAA)
2	D	Christian Krygier	183 cm (6 ft 0 in)	74 kg (163 lb)	5 May 2000	Novi, Michigan	Little Caesars Hockey Club (HPHL)
3	D	Will MacKinnon	180 cm (5 ft 11 in)	86 kg (190 lb)	13 April 2000	Plymouth, Michigan	HoneyBaked Hockey Club (HPHL)
5	D	Adam Samuelsson	193 cm (6 ft 4 in)	95 kg (209 lb)	21 June 2000	Rye, New York	Connecticut Jr. Rangers (USPHL)
6	D	Mattias Samuelsson – C	191 cm (6 ft 3 in)	91 kg (201 lb)	14 March 2000	Voorhees, New Jersey	Northwood School
4	D	Jacob Semik	183 cm (6 ft 0 in)	70 kg (150 lb)	10 March 2000	Canton, Michigan	HoneyBaked Hockey Club (HPHL)
17	F	Jack DeBoer	188 cm (6 ft 2 in)	88 kg (194 lb)	17 August 2000	Madison, New Jersey	Salisbury School (NEPSAC)
10	F	Jonathan Gruden	178 cm (5 ft 10 in)	66 kg (146 lb)	4 May 2000	Rochester, Michigan	HoneyBaked Hockey Club (HPHL)
16	F	Erik Middendorf	183 cm (6 ft 0 in)	75 kg (165 lb)	11 July 2000	Scottsdale, Arizona	Jr. Coyotes (T1EHL)
15	F	Jacob Pivonka – A	180 cm (5 ft 11 in)	81 kg (179 lb)	28 February 2000	Woodridge, Illinois	Chicago Mission (HPHL)
11	F	Ryan Savage	178 cm (5 ft 10 in)	75 kg (165 lb)	31 March 2000	Scottsdale, Arizona	EC Red Bull Salzburg
14	F	Oliver Wahlstrom	185 cm (6 ft 1 in)	86 kg (190 lb)	13 June 2000	Quincy, Massachusetts	Shattuck-Saint Mary's
8	F	T. J. Walsh	175 cm (5 ft 9 in)	73 kg (161 lb)	29 April 2000	Shrewsbury, Massachusetts	Cushing Academy (NEPSAC)
9	F	Tyler Weiss	178 cm (5 ft 10 in)	68 kg (150 lb)	3 January 2000	Raleigh, North Carolina	Don Mills Flyers (GTHL)
12	F	Jake Wise	180 cm (5 ft 11 in)	81 kg (179 lb)	28 February 2000	North Andover, Massachusetts	Central Catholic High School (MIAA)

Coaching staff

Head Coach: Scott Paluch
Assistant Coach: J. D. Forrest

Group Stage

Pos	Team	Pld	W	OTW	OTL	L	GF	GA	GD	Pts	Qualification
1	Canada	4	3	0	0	1	18	7	+11	9	Advance to semifinals
2	United States	4	3	0	0	1	18	7	+11	9	Advance to semifinals
3	Russia	4	2	1	0	1	21	9	+12	8	Advance to semifinals
4	Finland	4	1	0	1	2	14	11	+3	4	Advance to semifinals
5	Norway	4	0	0	0	4	1	38	−37	0	

Updated to match(es) played on 19 February 2016. Source: IIHF.com

13 February 2016; 20:00	United States	4–1 (2–1, 1–0, 1–0)	Finland	Kristins Hall; Attendance: 890

Game reference

Todd Scott
Goalies
Jimi Uusitalo
Referee:
(Switzerland) Alex DiPietro
Linesmen:
(France) Clement Goncalves
(Sweden) Tobias Nordlander

	0–1	02:36 – Salonen (Maki)
Wise (DeBoer, Krygier) – 08:39	1–1
Walsh (Emberson) – 13:10	2–1
Krygier (MacKinnon) – 20:25	3–1
Weiss (PS) – 42:12	4–1

4.5 min
Penalties
7.5 min
24
Shots
22

14 February 2016; 20:00	Norway	0–8 (0–3, 0–4, 0–1)	United States	Kristins Hall; Attendance: 2,094

Game reference

Theo Rooseboom de Vries
Goalies
Drew DeRidder
Referee:
(Germany) Marc Iwert
Linesmen:
(Belarus) Aleh Kliashcheunikau
(Denmark) Niclas Lundsgaard

0–1	06:48 – Wahlstrom (Weiss, DeBoer) (PP)
0–2	11:09 – Wahlstrom (Weiss, Wise)
0–3	11:49 – (Pivonka, Middendorf, Emberson)
0–4	17:09 – Pivonka (Walsh, M. Samuelsson) (PP)
0–5	21:35 – Middendorf (Krygier, Pivonka) (SH)
0–6	23:04 – Pivonka (Middendorf, Semik)
0–7	24:48 – DeBoer (Wise, Weiss)
0–8	30:31 – Wahlstrom (Wise, Weiss)

7.5 min
Penalties
6 min
11
Shots
35

16 February 2016; 14:00	United States	2–4 (2–1, 0–2, 0–1)	Canada	Kristins Hall; Attendance: 1,745

Game reference

Todd Scott
Goalies
Alexis Gravel
Referee:
(Sweden) Lars Johan Gossas
Linesmen:
(Belarus) Aleh Kliashcheunikau
(Sweden) Tobias Nordlander

	0–1	02:45 – McShane (McIsaac)
Weiss (Semik, Wise) (PP) – 09:40	1–1
Wise (T. J. Walsh, DeBoer) – 14:36	2–1
	2–2	21:52 – Fortier (Roberts, McShane)
	2–3	26:42 – Roberts (Focht, MacDonald)
	2–4	38:09 – Burzan (Dudas)

6 min
Penalties
6 min
23
Shots
20

18 February 2016; 17:00	Russia	2–4 (0–2, 1–0, 1–2)	United States	Youth Hall; Attendance: 564

Game reference

Amir Miftakhov
Goalies
Drew DeRidder
Referee:
(Switzerland) Alex DiPietro
Linesmen:
(Denmark) Niclas Lundgaard
(Sweden) Tobias Nordlander

	0–1	04:16 – Weiss (Wahlstrom)
	0–2	12:25 – DeBoer (Wise, Walsh)
Zhabreyev (Babintsev, Denisenko) – 22:38	1–2
	1–3	31:25 – Pivonka (Weiss)
	1–4	39:06 – Gruden (MacKinnon, Middendorf)
Nizhnikov (Denezhkin) – 42:46	2–4

26.5 min
Penalties
10.5 min
24
Shots
20

Semifinals

19 February 2016; 20:00	United States	3–0 (0–0, 1–0, 2–0)	Russia	Youth Hall; Attendance: 1,902

Game reference

Drew DeRidder
Goalies
Amir Miftakhov
Referee:
(Sweden) Lars Johan Gossas
Linesmen:
(United Kingdom) Danny Beresford
(Norway) Thomas Nordberg Pettersen

Pivonka (Middendorf, Savage) – 19:41	1–0
Wise (Gruden) (SH, EN) – 43:18	2–0
Walsh (Wise) – 44:30	3–0

6 min
Penalties
13 min
23
Shots
19

Gold medal game

21 February 2016; 15:00	Canada	2–5 (0–1, 1–2, 1–2)	United States	Kristins Hall; Attendance: 2,428

Game reference

Alexis Gravel
Olivier Rodrigue
Goalies
Drew DeRidder
Referee:
(Switzerland) Alex DiPietro
Linesmen:
(Denmark) Niclas Lundgaard
(Sweden) Tobias Nordlander

	0–1	08:00 – Walsh (Gruden, DeBoer)
	0–2	17:56 – DeBoer (Pivonka, Semik) (PP)
Merkley (Focht) (PP) – 24:32	1–2
	1–3	26:25 – Krygier (MacKinnon, Gruden)
McShane (Busby, Smith) – 41:11	2–3
	2–4	44:04 – Tyler Weiss (EN)
	2–5	44:41 – Wise (Pivonka) (PP, EN)

7.5 min
Penalties
4.5 min
25
Shots
23

Final Rank: (gold)

== Luge ==
Individual sleds

Athlete	Event	Run 1		Run 2		Total	
Athlete	Event	Time	Rank	Time	Rank	Time	Rank
Justine Taylor	Boys	48.908	13	49.248	16	1:38.156	15
Ashley Farquharson	Girls	DNF		did not advance			
Duncan Biles; Alanson Owen	Doubles	54.056	8	54.068	10	1:48.124	8

Mixed team relay

Athlete	Event	Girls		Boys		Doubles		Total	
Athlete	Event	Time	Rank	Time	Rank	Time	Rank	Time	Rank
Ashley Farquharson; Justine Taylor; Duncan Biles; Alanson Owen	Team relay	57.750	6	1:00.090	12	1:00.020	8	2:57.860	10

== Nordic combined ==
Individual

Athlete	Event	Ski jumping				Cross-country	
Athlete	Event	Distance	Points	Rank	Deficit	Time	Rank
Ben Loomis	Normal hill/5 km	98.5	129.7	2	0:08	13:36.6	2nd place, silver medalist(s)

Nordic mixed team

Athlete	Event	Ski jumping			Cross-country	
Athlete	Event	Points	Rank	Deficit	Time	Rank
Logan Sankey; Ben Loomis; Casey Larson; Hannah Halvorsen; Hunter Wonders	Nordic mixed team	286.2	10	1:59	28:26.7	8

== Short track speed skating ==
Boys

Athlete	Event	Quarterfinal		Semifinal		Final	
Athlete	Event	Time	Rank	Time	Rank	Time	Rank
Aaron Heo	500 m	44.052	3 SC/D	44.396	2 FC	45.413	11
Aaron Heo	1000 m	1:31.071	3 SC/D	1:52.861	1 FC	1:35.707	10

Mixed team relay

Athlete	Event	Semifinal		Final	
Athlete	Event	Time	Rank	Time	Rank
Team A April Shin (USA); Zang Yize (CHN); Pavel Sitnikov (RUS); Andras Sziklasi (HUN)	Mixed team relay	4:18.683	3 FB	4:25.169	6
Team E Gloria Ioriatti (ITA); Anna Seidel (GER); Aaron Heo (USA); Hong Kyung-hwan (KOR)	Mixed team relay	4:16.056	2 FA	PEN	

Qualification Legend: FA=Final A (medal); FB=Final B (non-medal); FC=Final C (non-medal); FD=Final D (non-medal); SA/B=Semifinals A/B; SC/D=Semifinals C/D; ADV=Advanced to Next Round; PEN=Penalized

== Skeleton ==
Athlete	Event	Run 1		Run 2		Total	
Athlete	Event	Time	Rank	Time	Rank	Time	Rank
Kindrick Carter	Boys	55.16	11	54.95	11	1:50.11	11
Mitchell Jones	Boys	55.43	13	55.61	14	1:51.04	13
Rebecca Hass	Girls	56.95	11	56.58	8	1:53.53	9
Kalyn McGuire	Girls	57.19	12	57.61	16	1:54.80	16

== Ski jumping ==
Individual

Athlete	Event	First round			Final			Total	
Athlete	Event	Distance	Points	Rank	Distance	Points	Rank	Points	Rank
Casey Larson	Boys' normal hill	97.0	119.0	6	87.0	102.5	9	221.5	6
Logan Sankey	Girls' normal hill	74.0	65.8	12	69.0	58.7	12	124.5	12

Team

Athlete	Event	First round		Final		Total	
Athlete	Event	Points	Rank	Points	Rank	Points	Rank
Logan Sankey; Ben Loomis; Casey Larson	Team competition	273.8	10	257.8	11	531.6	10

== Snowboarding ==
Halfpipe

Athlete	Event	Final				
Athlete	Event	Run 1	Run 2	Run 3	Best	Rank
Nikolas Baden	Boys' halfpipe	83.25	50.50	85.25	85.25	2nd place, silver medalist(s)
Jake Pates	Boys' halfpipe	46.50	92.00	93.00	93.00	1st place, gold medalist(s)
Chloe Kim	Girls' halfpipe	94.25	96.50	96.25	96.50	1st place, gold medalist(s)
Hailey Langland	Girls' halfpipe	39.75	52.50	56.00	56.00	9

Snowboard cross

Athlete	Event	Qualification		Group heats		Semifinal	Final
Athlete	Event	Time	Rank	Points	Rank	Position	Position
Jake Vedder	Boys' snowboard cross	47.91	2 Q	20	1 Q	1 FA	1st place, gold medalist(s)
Shannon Maguire	Girls' snowboard cross	52.04	5 Q	13	9	did not advance	

Slopestyle

Athlete	Event	Final			
Athlete	Event	Run 1	Run 2	Best	Rank
Nikolas Baden	Boys' slopestyle	64.50	52.00	64.50	11
Jake Pates	Boys' slopestyle	93.00	94.75	94.75	1st place, gold medalist(s)
Chloe Kim	Girls' slopestyle	87.50	88.25	88.25	1st place, gold medalist(s)
Hailey Langland	Girls' slopestyle	64.25	55.75	64.25	8

Snowboard and ski cross relay

Athlete	Event	Quarterfinal	Semifinal	Final
Athlete	Event	Position	Position	Position
Shannon Maguire; Abigail Zagnoli; Jake Vedder; Russell Malm	Team snowboard ski cross	2 Q	4 FB	8

Qualification legend: FA – Qualify to medal round; FB – Qualify to consolation round

== Speed skating ==
Boys

Athlete	Event	Race 1		Race 2		Final	
Athlete	Event	Time	Rank	Time	Rank	Time	Rank
Austin Kleba	500 m	37.14	4	37.19	9	74.34	6
Austin Kleba	1500 m	—N/a				1:53.87	5
Austin Kleba	Mass start	—N/a				6:01.63	24

Mixed team sprint

Athletes	Event	Final	
Athletes	Event	Time	Rank
Team 9 Elisa Dul (NED); Karolina Gasecka (POL); Austin Kleba (USA); Anvar Mukhamadeyev (KAZ)	Mixed team sprint	1:58.80	2nd place, silver medalist(s)

== See also ==
- United States at the 2016 Summer Olympics
