= Snowboarding at the 2016 Winter Youth Olympics – Boys' halfpipe =

Olympics snowboarding event

Boys' halfpipe at the II Winter Youth Olympic Games
- Venue: Hafjell Freepark
- Dates: 14 February
- Competitors: 16 from 12 nations
- Winning points: 93.00

Medalists
1st place, gold medalist(s)		Jake Pates	United States
2nd place, silver medalist(s)		Nikolas Baden	United States
3rd place, bronze medalist(s)		Tit Štante	Slovenia

The boys' halfpipe event at the 2016 Winter Youth Olympics took place on 14 February at the Hafjell Freepark.

== Results ==
The final was started at 10:50.

Rank	Bib	Name	Country	Run 1	Run 2	Run 3	Best
1st place, gold medalist(s)	1	Jake Pates	United States	93.00	92.00	46.50	93.00
2nd place, silver medalist(s)	15	Nikolas Baden	United States	83.25	50.50	85.25	85.25
3rd place, bronze medalist(s)	2	Tit Štante	Slovenia	75.50	71.50	80.25	80.25
4	5	Lee Min-sik	South Korea	77.00	20.25	77.50	77.50
5	4	Tiarn Collins	New Zealand	72.25	14.00	76.25	76.25
6	3	Rakai Tait	New Zealand	67.25	75.75	67.00	75.75
7	8	Gian Andrea Sutter	Switzerland	57.00	47.50	62.75	62.75
8	6	Rene Rinnekangas	Finland	36.25	62.00	39.00	62.00
9	13	Liu Xinyu	China	61.00	57.00	60.25	61.00
10	16	Ville Mustonen	Finland	56.00	30.75	24.75	56.00
11	10	Mathias Eckhoff	Norway	34.75	55.00	16.25	55.00
12	12	Moritz Amsüss	Austria	51.00	26.00	45.50	51.00
13	7	Stef Vandeweyer	Belgium	22.25	48.25	44.25	48.25
14	14	Daniel Kašpar	Czech Republic	33.50	44.25	47.75	47.75
15	11	Wendelin Gauger	Switzerland	46.75	14.25	47.00	47.00
16	9	Christoph Lechner	Germany	35.00	35.75	35.00	35.75
