= Freestyle skiing at the 2016 Winter Youth Olympics – Girls' halfpipe =

Girls' halfpipe at the II Winter Youth Olympic Games
- Venue: Oslo Vinterpark
- Dates: 14 February
- Competitors: 6 from 5 nations
- Winning points: 88.60

Medalists
1st place, gold medalist(s)		Madison Rowlands	Great Britain
2nd place, silver medalist(s)		Paula Cooper	United States
3rd place, bronze medalist(s)		Lara Wolf	Austria

The girls' halfpipe event at the 2016 Winter Youth Olympics took place on 14 February at the Oslo Vinterpark.

== Results ==
Rank	Order	Athlete	Country	Run 1	Run 2	Run 3	Best
1st place, gold medalist(s)	3	Madison Rowlands	Great Britain	83.20	88.60	41.60	88.60
2nd place, silver medalist(s)	5	Paula Cooper	United States	72.60	79.00	34.40	79.00
3rd place, bronze medalist(s)	6	Lara Wolf	Austria	46.00	65.40	74.20	74.20
4	4	Nikita Rubocki	United States	68.40	70.20	58.80	70.20
5	2	Mackenzie Wilson	Canada	62.20	60.00	53.40	62.20
6	1	Lana Prusakova	Russia	52.40	55.60	49.20	55.60
