= Snowboarding at the 2016 Winter Youth Olympics – Boys' slopestyle =

Boys' slopestyle at the II Winter Youth Olympic Games
- Venue: Hafjell Freepark
- Dates: 19 February
- Competitors: 22 from 15 nations
- Winning points: 94.75

Medalists
1st place, gold medalist(s)		Jake Pates	United States
2nd place, silver medalist(s)		Vlad Khadarin	Russia
3rd place, bronze medalist(s)		Rene Rinnekangas	Finland

The boys' slopestyle event at the 2016 Winter Youth Olympics took place on 19 February at the Hafjell Freepark.

== Results ==
Rank	Order	Athlete	Country	Run 1	Run 2	Best
1st place, gold medalist(s)	13	Jake Pates	United States	93.00	94.75	94.75
2nd place, silver medalist(s)	10	Vlad Khadarin	Russia	84.25	90.25	90.25
3rd place, bronze medalist(s)	20	Rene Rinnekangas	Finland	70.00	87.75	87.75
4	19	Tiarn Collins	New Zealand	65.50	86.25	86.25
5	2	Isak Ulstein	Norway	85.50	44.75	85.50
6	11	Simon Gschaider	Austria	36.25	82.75	82.75
7	9	Mathias Eckhoff	Norway	81.75	32.00	81.75
8	22	Gian Andrea Sutter	Switzerland	40.50	76.50	76.50
9	16	Stef Vandeweyer	Belgium	73.00	36.00	73.00
10	14	Tit Štante	Slovenia	58.00	71.50	71.50
11	3	Nik Baden	United States	64.50	52.00	64.50
12	21	Enzo Valax	France	31.75	57.25	57.25
13	1	Rakai Tait	New Zealand	53.00	11.50	53.00
14	6	Christoph Lechner	Germany	23.50	53.00	53.00
15	12	Moritz Amsüss	Austria	47.50	45.75	47.50
16	17	Wendelin Gauger	Switzerland	46.00	25.25	46.00
17	8	Tino Stojak	Croatia	38.75	20.00	38.75
18	18	Lee Min-sik	South Korea	36.25	26.75	36.25
19	5	Erik Bastiaansen	Netherlands	31.50	31.00	31.50
20	15	Ok Ho-gwang	South Korea	30.25	18.75	30.25
21	4	Ville Mustonen	Finland	30.00	27.75	30.00
22	7	Aarón Stoeff	Argentina	25.75	20.00	25.75
