= Freestyle skiing at the 2016 Winter Youth Olympics – Boys' slopestyle =

Boys' slopestyle at the II Winter Youth Olympic Games
- Venue: Hafjell Freepark
- Dates: 19 February
- Competitors: 18 from 14 nations
- Winning points: 89.20

Medalists
1st place, gold medalist(s)		Birk Ruud	Norway
2nd place, silver medalist(s)		Alexander Hall	United States
3rd place, bronze medalist(s)		Finn Bilous	New Zealand

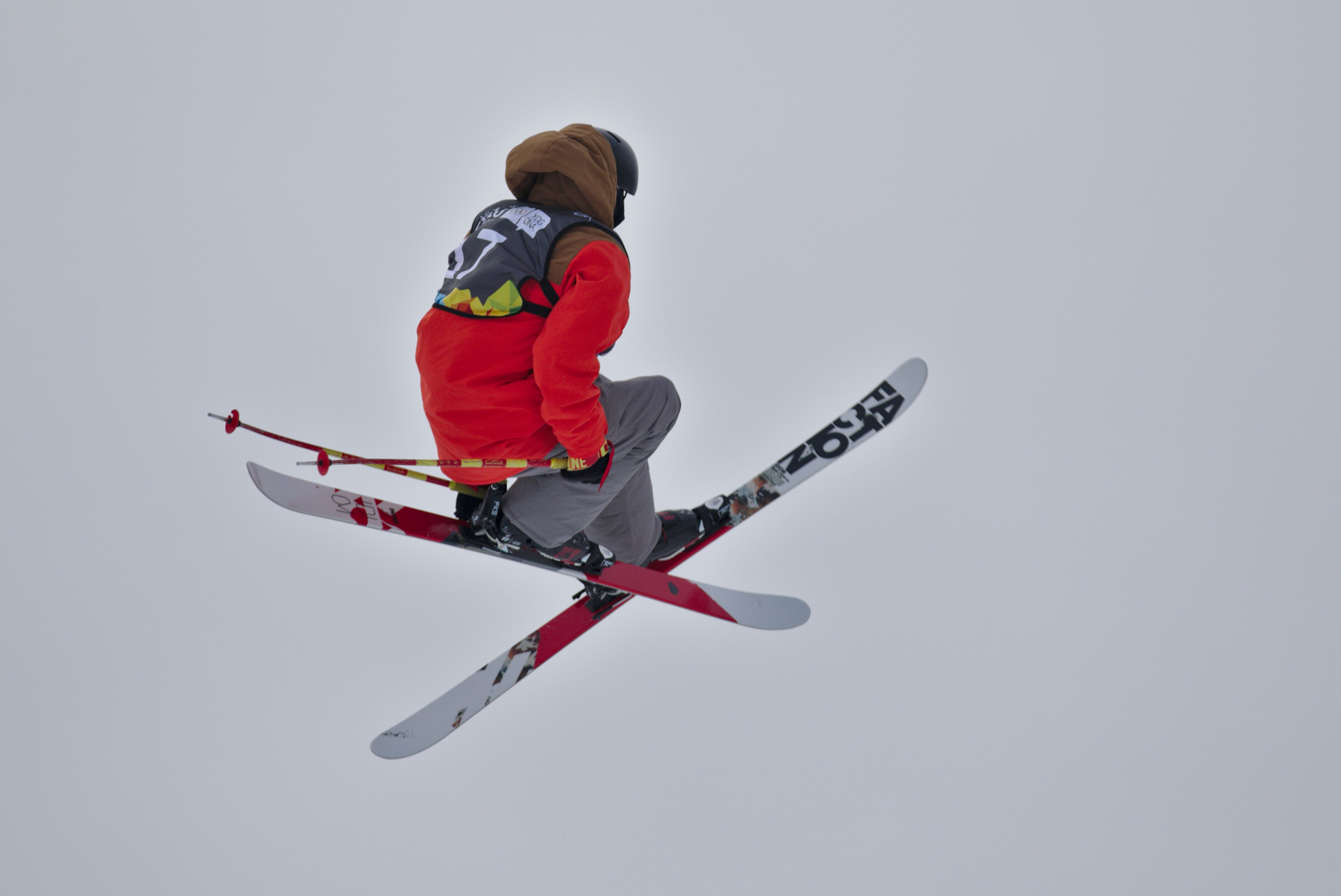
Competitor performing at the 2016 slopestyley ski event

The boys' slopestyle event at the 2016 Winter Youth Olympics took place on 19 February at the Hafjell Freepark.

== Results ==
Rank	Order	Athlete	Country	Run 1	Run 2	Best
1st place, gold medalist(s)	13	Birk Ruud	Norway	89.20	57.80	89.20
2nd place, silver medalist(s)	19	Alexander Hall	United States	83.20	87.40	87.40
3rd place, bronze medalist(s)	8	Finn Bilous	New Zealand	86.00	61.20	86.00
4	12	Cal Sandieson	Great Britain	72.80	81.00	81.00
5	17	Trym Sunde Andreassen	Norway	79.80	39.80	79.80
6	10	Jackson Wells	New Zealand	61.40	79.00	79.00
7	9	Max Mall	Austria	67.80	78.00	78.00
8	5	Emil Granbom	Sweden	77.80	17.60	77.80
9	15	Théo Collomb-Patton	France	45.80	73.20	73.20
10	7	Joona Sipola	Finland	47.80	63.00	63.00
11	11	Colin Wili	Switzerland	58.40	61.40	61.40
12	4	Moritz Neuhauser	Germany	8.60	56.20	56.20
13	18	Cameron Waddell	Australia	54.20	55.80	55.80
14	6	Benjamin Garces	Chile	20.00	52.60	52.60
15	3	Marco Ladner	Austria	51.40	14.20	51.40
16	16	Maksimiljan Blažon	Slovenia	50.20	47.80	50.20
17	14	Mario Grob	Switzerland	42.80	45.20	45.20
18	2	Lee Kang-bok	South Korea	12.00	11.40	12.00
	1	Birk Irving	United States			DNS
