= FIS Freestyle Ski and Snowboarding World Championships 2025 – Men's snowboard cross =

Men's snowboard cross at the FIS Freestyle Ski and Snowboarding World Championships 2025
- Location: Corvatsch, Switzerland
- Date: 27 March (qualification); 28 March (final)
- Competitors: 52

Medalists
gold medal	Éliot Grondin	Canada
silver medal	Loan Bozzolo	France
bronze medal	Alessandro Hämmerle	Austria

The Men's snowboard cross competition at the FIS Freestyle Ski and Snowboarding World Championships 2025 was held on 27 and 28 March 2025.

== Qualification ==
Rank	Bib	Name	Country	Run 1	Run 2	Notes
1	5	Adam Lambert	Australia	1:01.88		Q
2	6	Loan Bozzolo	France	1:01.95		Q
3	8	Éliot Grondin	Canada	1:01.21		Q
4	11	Jakob Dusek	Austria	1:01.85		Q
5	3	Lukas Pachner	Austria	1:02.06		Q
6	4	Julien Tomas	France	1:02.11		Q
7	1	Alessandro Hämmerle	Austria	1:02.15		Q
8	25	Paul Berg	Germany	1:02.46		Q
9	32	Huw Nightingale	United Kingdom	1:02.57		Q
10	9	Jake Vedder	United States	1:02.60		Q
11	14	Aidan Chollet	France	1:02.65		Q
12	15	Cameron Bolton	Australia	1:02.65		Q
13	7	Martin Nörl	Germany	1:02.69		Q
14	2	Lucas Eguibar	Spain	1:02.80		Q
15	16	Lorenzo Sommariva	Italy	1:02.90		Q
16	17	Nick Baumgartner	Austria	1:02.55		Q
17	18	Radek Houser	Czech Republic	1:02.78		Q
18	23	Jarryd Hughes	Australia	1:02.66		Q
19	26	Kryštof Choura	Czech Republic	1:02.89		Q
20	22	Evan Bichon	Canada	1:02.93		Q
21	10	Leon Ulbricht	Germany	1:03.01	1:02.56	Q
22	12	Merlin Surget	France	1:03.81	1:02.72	Q
23	30	Elias Leitner	Austria	1:03.05	1:02.80	Q
24	33	Jan Kubičík	Czech Republic	1:03.84	1:03.11	Q
25	19	Julian Lüftner	Austria	1:03.22	1:03.17	Q
26	24	Glenn de Blois	Netherlands	1:02.98	1:03.34	Q
27	20	Nathan Pare	United States	1:03.00	1:03.37	Q
28	28	Liam Moffat	Canada	1:03.24	1:03.37	Q
29	13	Omar Visintin	Italy	1:03.11	1:03.43	Q
30	27	Leon Beckhaus	Germany	1:03.27	1:03.75	Q
31	39	Noah Bethonico	Brazil	1:03.27	1:03.97	Q
32	21	Cody Winters	United States	1:03.52	1:04.02	Q
33	35	Declan Dent	Australia	1:03.94	1:04.08	
34	29	Tommaso Leoni	Italy	1:04.40	1:04.08	
35	38	Yoshiki Takahara	Japan	1:03.30	1:04.27	
36	34	Matteo Menconi	Italy	1:04.52	1:04.38	
37	31	Valerio Jud	Switzerland	1:04.13	1:04.44	
38	40	Daan Stam	Netherlands	1:05.02	1:04.97	
39	37	Drew Powell	Latvia	1:05.19	1:05.37	
40	42	Bernat Ribera	Spain	1:04.71	1:05.64	
41	36	Kota Sakurai	Japan	1:06.45	1:05.72	
42	44	Matyáš Turinský	Czech Republic	1:05.66	1:05.88	
43	43	Gao Dali	China	1:05.27	1:05.92	
44	49	Antoni Toledo	Spain	1:06.29	1:05.93	
45	48	Anton Karpov	Ukraine	1:06.45	1:06.04	
46	46	Oliver Šebesta	Slovakia	1:06.09	1:06.34	
47	51	Ivan Malovannyi	Ukraine	1:07.42	1:06.47	
48	41	Colby Graham	Canada	1:06.91	1:06.51	
49	50	Seigo Sato	Japan	1:07.07	1:06.68	
50	47	Roman Aleksandrovskyy	Ukraine	1:07.00	1:07.07	
51	45	Facundo Pardo	Argentina	1:10.53	1:00.98	
	52	Víctor Chávez	Peru	Did not start		

== Elimination round ==
=== 1/8 finals ===
Heat 1

Rank	Bib	Name	Country	Notes
1	1	Éliot Grondin	Canada	Q
2	17	Lucas Eguibar	Spain	Q
3	16	Radek Houser	Czech Republic	
4	32	Cody Winters	United States	

Heat 3

Rank	Bib	Name	Country	Notes
1	12	Cameron Bolton	Australia	Q
2	5	Lukas Pachner	Austria	Q
3	21	Leon Ulbricht	Germany	
4	28	Liam Moffat	Canada	

Heat 5

Rank	Bib	Name	Country	Notes
1	3	Adam Lambert	Australia	Q
2	19	Lorenzo Sommariva	Italy	Q
3	14	Jarryd Hughes	Australia	
4	30	Leon Beckhaus	Germany	

Heat 7

Rank	Bib	Name	Country	Notes
1	7	Alessandro Hämmerle	Austria	Q
2	10	Huw Nightingale	United Kingdom	Q
3	26	Glenn de Blois	Netherlands	
4	23	Elias Leitner	Austria	

Heat 2

Rank	Bib	Name	Country	Notes
1	25	Julian Lüftner	Austria	Q
2	9	Nick Baumgartner	Austria	Q
3	24	Jan Kubičík	Czech Republic	
	8	Paul Berg	Germany	DNF

Heat 4

Rank	Bib	Name	Country	Notes
1	13	Aidan Chollet	France	Q
2	4	Loan Bozzolo	France	Q
3	29	Omar Visintin	Italy	
	20	Evan Bichon	Canada	DNF

Heat 6

Rank	Bib	Name	Country	Notes
1	11	Jake Vedder	United States	Q
2	27	Nathan Pare	United States	Q
3	6	Julien Tomas	France	
	22	Merlin Surget	France	DNF

Heat 8

Rank	Bib	Name	Country	Notes
1	2	Jakob Dusek	Austria	Q
2	15	Martin Nörl	Germany	Q
3	18	Kryštof Choura	Czech Republic	
4	31	Noah Bethonico	Brazil	

=== Quarterfinals ===
Heat 1

Rank	Bib	Name	Country	Notes
1	9	Nick Baumgartner	United States	Q
2	1	Éliot Grondin	Canada	Q
3	17	Lucas Eguibar	Spain	
4	25	Julian Lüftner	Austria	

Heat 3

Rank	Bib	Name	Country	Notes
1	27	Nathan Pare	United States	Q
2	11	Jake Vedder	United States	Q
3	3	Adam Lambert	Australia	
	19	Lorenzo Sommariva	Italy	DNF

Heat 2

Rank	Bib	Name	Country	Notes
1	4	Loan Bozzolo	France	Q
2	13	Aidan Chollet	France	Q
3	12	Cameron Bolton	Australia	
4	5	Lukas Pachner	Austria	

Heat 4

Rank	Bib	Name	Country	Notes
1	2	Jakob Dusek	Austria	Q
2	7	Alessandro Hämmerle	Austria	Q
3	10	Huw Nightingale	United Kingdom	
4	15	Martin Nörl	Germany	

=== Semifinals ===
Heat 1

Rank	Bib	Name	Country	Notes
1	1	Éliot Grondin	Canada	Q
2	4	Loan Bozzolo	France	Q
3	13	Aidan Chollet	France	
4	9	Nick Baumgartner	United States	

Heat 2

Rank	Bib	Name	Country	Notes
1	2	Jakob Dusek	Austria	Q
2	7	Alessandro Hämmerle	Austria	Q
3	11	Jake Vedder	United States	
4	27	Nathan Pare	United States	

=== Finals ===
==== Small final ====
Rank	Bib	Name	Country	Notes
5	9	Nick Baumgartner	United States	
6	27	Nathan Pare	United States	
7	11	Jake Vedder	United States	
8	13	Aidan Chollet	France	

==== Big final ====
Rank	Bib	Name	Country	Notes
1st place, gold medalist(s)	1	Éliot Grondin	Canada	
2nd place, silver medalist(s)	4	Loan Bozzolo	France	
3rd place, bronze medalist(s)	7	Alessandro Hämmerle	Austria	
4	2	Jakob Dusek	Austria	
