= New Zealand at the 2016 Winter Youth Olympics =

- IOC code: NZL
- NOC: New Zealand Olympic Committee
- Website: www.olympic.org.nz

in Lillehammer, Norway
- Competitors: 11 in 5 sports
- Flag bearer: Finn Bilous
- Medals Ranked =22nd: Gold 0 Silver 1 Bronze 1 Total 2

Winter Youth Olympics appearances
- 2012; 2016; 2020; 2024

New Zealand competed at the 2016 Winter Youth Olympics in Lillehammer, Norway, from 12 to 21 February 2016. It was New Zealand's second appearance at the Winter Youth Olympic Games, having competed at the inaugural Games four years earlier.

The New Zealand team consisted of 11 athletes (eight men and five women) competing in five sports. The flag bearer for the team was freestyle skier Finn Bilous, who won both of New Zealand's medals at the Games.

== Medallists ==
Medal	Name	Sport	Event	Date
Silver	Finn Bilous	Freestyle skiing	Boys' halfpipe	14 February
Bronze	Finn Bilous	Freestyle skiing	Boys' slopestyle	19 February

== Alpine skiing ==
Athlete	Event	Run 1		Run 2		Total	
Athlete	Event	Time	Rank	Time	Rank	Time	Rank
Elizabeth Reid	Girls' slalom	58.07	16	DNF			
Elizabeth Reid	Girls' giant slalom	DNF		Did not advance			
Elizabeth Reid	Girls' super-G	—N/a				1:16.87	20
Elizabeth Reid	Girls' combined	1:17.25	15	45.39	15	2:02.64	11
Jackson Rich	Boys' slalom	1:00.70	41	DNF			
Jackson Rich	Boys' giant slalom	1:24.54	34	Did not advance			
Jackson Rich	Boys' super-G	—N/a				DNF	
Jackson Rich	Boys' combined	1:16.76	38	46.28	27	2:03.04	25

== Curling ==
=== Mixed team ===
Team

- Matthew Neilson
- Ben Smith
- Courtney Smith
- Holly Thompson

Round Robin

Group A	Skip	W	L
United States	Luc Violette	6	1
Switzerland	Selina Witschonke	6	1
Russia	Nadezhda Karelina	6	1
Turkey	Oğuzhan Karakurt	3	4
Italy	Luca Rizzolli	3	4
China	Du Hongrui	2	5
New Zealand	Matthew Neilson	1	6
Japan	Kota Ito	1	6

Draw 1

Sheet B	1	2	3	4	5	6	7	8	Final
Russia (Karelina)	3	0	1	0	2	0	0	1	7
New Zealand (Neilson) 🔨	0	2	0	1	0	0	2	0	5

Draw 2

Sheet C	1	2	3	4	5	6	7	8	Final
Italy (Rizzolli) 🔨	1	0	2	2	1	1	0	X	7
New Zealand (Neilson)	0	1	0	0	0	0	1	X	2

Draw 3

Sheet A	1	2	3	4	5	6	7	8	Final
Turkey (Karakurt)	2	0	2	1	2	0	6	X	13
New Zealand (Neilson) 🔨	0	4	0	0	0	1	0	X	5

Draw 4

Sheet D	1	2	3	4	5	6	7	8	Final
Switzerland (Witschonke) 🔨	0	3	3	0	1	0	2	X	9
New Zealand (Neilson)	2	0	0	1	0	1	0	X	4

Draw 5

Sheet B	1	2	3	4	5	6	7	8	Final
New Zealand (Neilson)	2	0	0	0	1	0	0	X	3
United States (Violette) 🔨	0	2	1	3	0	2	2	X	10

Draw 6

Sheet C	1	2	3	4	5	6	7	8	Final
New Zealand (Neilson) 🔨	2	0	0	0	3	0	2	X	7
Japan (Ito)	0	2	1	1	0	1	0	X	5

Draw 7

Sheet A	1	2	3	4	5	6	7	8	Final
New Zealand (Neilson)	0	0	2	1	2	0	0	0	5
China (Du) 🔨	1	1	0	0	0	2	1	1	6

=== Mixed doubles ===
Athletes	Event	Round of 32	Round of 16	Quarterfinals	Semifinals	Final / BM	
Athletes	Event	Opposition Result	Opposition Result	Opposition Result	Opposition Result	Opposition Result	Rank
Holly Thompson (NZL); Sterling Middleton (CAN)	Mixed doubles	Smith (GBR); Hong (KOR); W 8 – 2	Polat (TUR); Zhang (CHN); W 9 – 2	Matsuzawa (JPN); Hoesli (SUI); L 1 – 11	Did not advance		
Courtney Smith (NZL); Henwy Lockmann (SUI)	Mixed doubles	Ramsfjell (NOR); Kim (KOR); L 4 – 10	Did not advance				
Maria Arkhipova (RUS); Matthew Neilson (NZL)	Mixed doubles	Lee (KOR); Nygren (SWE); L 4 – 11	Did not advance				
Cora Farrell (USA); Ben Smith (NZL)	Mixed doubles	Oh (KOR); Esenboga (TUR); L 1 – 8	Did not advance				

== Freestyle skiing ==
Athlete	Event	Final				
Athlete	Event	Run 1	Run 2	Run 3	Best	Rank
Finn Bilous	Boys' halfpipe	89.60	90.80	92.20	92.20	2nd place, silver medalist(s)
Finn Bilous	Boys' slopestyle	86.00	61.20	—N/a	86.00	3rd place, bronze medalist(s)
Jackson Wells	Boys' slopestyle	61.40	79.00	—N/a	79.00	6

== Ice hockey ==
Athlete	Event	Qualification		Final	
Athlete	Event	Points	Rank	Points	Rank
Ollie Curtis	Boys' individual skills challenge	8	14	Did not advance	

== Snowboarding ==
Athlete	Event	Final				
Athlete	Event	Run 1	Run 2	Run 3	Best	Rank
Tiarn Collins	Boys' halfpipe	72.25	14.00	76.25	76.25	5
Tiarn Collins	Boys' slopestyle	65.50	86.25	—N/a	86.25	4
Rakai Tait	Boys' halfpipe	67.25	75.75	67.00	75.75	6
Rakai Tait	Boys' slopestyle	53.00	11.50	—N/a	53.00	13

== See also ==
- New Zealand at the 2016 Summer Olympics
