= Switzerland at the 2016 Winter Youth Olympics =

- IOC code: SUI
- NOC: Swiss Olympic Association
- Website: www.swissolympic.ch

in Lillehammer
- Competitors: 48 in 11 sports
- Medals Ranked 6th: Gold 4 Silver 3 Bronze 4 Total 11

Winter Youth Olympics appearances
- 2012; 2016; 2020; 2024

Switzerland competed at the 2016 Winter Youth Olympics in Lillehammer, Norway from 12 to 21 February 2016.

== Medalists ==
Medal	Name	Sport	Event	Date
Gold	Aline Danioth	Alpine skiing	Girls' combined	14 February
Gold	Talina Gantenbein	Freestyle skiing	Girls' ski cross	15 February
Gold	Mélanie Meillard	Alpine skiing	Girls' giant slalom	16 February
Gold	Aline Danioth	Alpine skiing	Girls' slalom	18 February
Silver	Mélanie Meillard	Alpine skiing	Girls' combined	14 February
Silver	Sophie Hediger	Snowboarding	Girls' snowboard cross	15 February
Silver	Sophie Hediger; Talina Gantenbein; Pascal Bitschnau; Sascha Rüedi	Snowboarding	Team snowboard ski cross	16 February
Bronze	Aline Danioth	Alpine skiing	Girls' super-G	13 February
Bronze	Aline Danioth	Alpine skiing	Girls' giant slalom	16 February
Bronze	Selina Witschonke; Henwy Lochmann; Laura Engler; Philipp Hösli	Curling	Mixed Team	17 February
Bronze	Switzerland women's national under-16 ice hockey team: Sina Bachmann; Sydney Berta; Tina Brand; Yaël Brich; Oona Emmenegger; Rahel Enzler; Ramona Forrer; Justine Forster; Janine Hauser; Saskia Maurer; Lisa Rüedi; Noemi Ryhner; Jessica Schlegel; Gionina Spiess; Nicole Vallario; Stefanie Wetli; Lara Zimmermann	Ice hockey	Girls' tournament	20 February

=== Medalists in mixed NOCs events ===
Medal	Name	Sport	Event	Date
Gold	Philipp Hösli	Curling	Mixed doubles	21 February

== Alpine skiing ==
Boys

Athlete	Event	Run 1		Run 2		Total	
Athlete	Event	Time	Rank	Time	Rank	Time	Rank
Joël Oehrli	Slalom	52.28	22	did not finish			
Joël Oehrli	Giant slalom	1:19.25	7	1:20.07	13	2:39.32	9
Joël Oehrli	Super-G	—N/a				1:11.41	6
Joël Oehrli	Combined	1:12.46	7	42.32	12	1:54.78	7
Maurus Sparr	Slalom	51.52	13	52.85	23	1:44.37	21
Maurus Sparr	Giant slalom	1:20.16	14	1:19.41	10	2:39.57	10
Maurus Sparr	Super-G	—N/a				1:12.25	14
Maurus Sparr	Combined	1:13.49	19	did not finish			

Girls

Athlete	Event	Run 1		Run 2		Total	
Athlete	Event	Time	Rank	Time	Rank	Time	Rank
Aline Danioth	Slalom	53.53	1	49.68	1	1:43.21	1st place, gold medalist(s)
Aline Danioth	Giant slalom	1:18.46	3	1:15.49	3	2:33.95	3rd place, bronze medalist(s)
Aline Danioth	Super-G	—N/a				1:12.69	3rd place, bronze medalist(s)
Aline Danioth	Combined	1:13.59	2	42.15	1	1:55.74	1st place, gold medalist(s)
Mélanie Meillard	Slalom	DNF		did not advance			
Mélanie Meillard	Giant slalom	1:17.84	2	1:15.44	2	2:33.28	1st place, gold medalist(s)
Mélanie Meillard	Super-G	—N/a				1:13.05	4
Mélanie Meillard	Combined	1:13.44	1	42.68	2	1:56.12	2nd place, silver medalist(s)

Parallel mixed team

Athletes	Event	Round of 16	Quarterfinals	Semifinals	Final / BM	
Athletes	Event	Opposition Score	Opposition Score	Opposition Score	Opposition Score	Rank
Mélanie Meillard; Maurus Sparr	Parallel mixed team	Belgium; W 3 – 1	Germany; L 2 – 2^{+}	did not advance		

== Biathlon ==
Boys

Athlete	Event	Time	Misses	Rank
Nico Salutt	Sprint	21:24.1	4	29
Nico Salutt	Pursuit	35:03.8	10	37
Sebastian Stalder	Sprint	19:57.9	0	10
Sebastian Stalder	Pursuit	31:06.9	5	11

Girls

Athlete	Event	Time	Misses	Rank
Flavia Barmettler	Sprint	21:34.4	4	=41
Flavia Barmettler	Pursuit	31:18.0	6	37
Anja Fischer	Sprint	21:34.4	2	=41
Anja Fischer	Pursuit	34:34.2	9	44

Mixed

Athletes	Event	Time	Misses	Rank
Flavia Barmettler; Sebastian Stalder	Single mixed relay	42:33.9	0+9	7
Flavia Barmettler; Anja Fischer; Nico Salutt; Sebastian Stalder	Mixed relay	1:25:15.9	3+14	8

== Bobsleigh ==
Athlete	Event	Run 1		Run 2		Total	
Athlete	Event	Time	Rank	Time	Rank	Time	Rank
Marius Schneider	Boys'	57.53	6	57.47	4	1:55.00	5
Paulina Götschi	Girls'	59.32	8	59.61	11	1:58.93	8

== Cross-country skiing ==
Boys

Athlete	Event	Qualification		Quarterfinal		Semifinal		Final	
Athlete	Event	Time	Rank	Time	Rank	Time	Rank	Time	Rank
Arnaud Guex	10 km freestyle	—N/a						DNS	
Arnaud Guex	Classical sprint	3:08.57	20 Q	3:04.87	4	did not advance			
Arnaud Guex	Cross-country cross	3:11.70	9 Q	—N/a		3:11.18	3	did not advance	
Maurus Lozza	10 km freestyle	—N/a						25:36.2	18
Maurus Lozza	Classical sprint	3:13.13	28 Q	3:37.61	6	did not advance			
Maurus Lozza	Cross-country cross	3:16.62	19 Q	—N/a		3:10.46	6	did not advance	

Girls

Athlete	Event	Qualification		Quarterfinal		Semifinal		Final	
Athlete	Event	Time	Rank	Time	Rank	Time	Rank	Time	Rank
Désirée Steiner	5 km freestyle	—N/a						13:57.0	11
Désirée Steiner	Classical sprint	3:35.60	8 Q	3:28.51	2 Q	3:29.64	4	did not advance	
Désirée Steiner	Cross-country cross	3:47.31	14 Q	—N/a		3:41.81	5	did not advance	
Giuliana Werro	5 km freestyle	—N/a						14:18.3	20
Giuliana Werro	Classical sprint	3:42.98	23 Q	3:38.23	6	did not advance			
Giuliana Werro	Cross-country cross	3:57.09	27 Q	—N/a		3:52.99	10	did not advance	

== Curling ==
=== Mixed team ===
Team

- Laura Engler
- Philipp Hösli
- Henwy Lochmann
- Selina Witschonke

Round Robin

Group A	Skip	W	L
United States	Luc Violette	6	1
Switzerland	Selina Witschonke	6	1
Russia	Nadezhda Karelina	6	1
Turkey	Oğuzhan Karakurt	3	4
Italy	Luca Rizzolli	3	4
China	Du Hongrui	2	5
New Zealand	Matthew Neilson	1	6
Japan	Kota Ito	1	6

Draw 1

Sheet D	1	2	3	4	5	6	7	8	Final
China (Du)	0	0	1	0	0	1	0	X	2
Switzerland (Witschonke) 🔨	1	1	0	3	1	0	1	X	7

Draw 2

Sheet A	1	2	3	4	5	6	7	8	Final
United States (Violette) 🔨	0	0	2	0	2	0	0	2	6
Switzerland (Witschonke)	0	1	0	1	0	3	0	0	5

Draw 3

Sheet B	1	2	3	4	5	6	7	8	9	Final
Japan (Ito)	0	1	0	1	1	1	0	1	0	5
Switzerland (Witschonke) 🔨	4	0	1	0	0	0	0	0	1	6

Draw 4

Sheet D	1	2	3	4	5	6	7	8	Final
Switzerland (Witschonke) 🔨	0	3	3	0	1	0	2	X	9
New Zealand (Neilson)	2	0	0	1	0	1	0	X	4

Draw 5

Sheet C	1	2	3	4	5	6	7	8	Final
Russia (Karelina)	0	0	1	0	1	0	3	0	5
Switzerland (Witschonke) 🔨	1	1	0	2	0	2	0	1	7

Draw 6

Sheet B	1	2	3	4	5	6	7	8	Final
Switzerland (Witschonke)	1	0	2	0	1	3	0	X	7
Turkey (Karakurt) 🔨	0	1	0	1	0	0	1	X	3

Draw 7

Sheet C	1	2	3	4	5	6	7	8	Final
Switzerland (Witschonke) 🔨	0	2	1	0	2	3	0	1	9
Italy (Rizzolli)	0	0	0	4	0	0	2	0	6

Quarterfinals

Sheet B	1	2	3	4	5	6	7	8	Final
Switzerland (Witschonke) 🔨	2	0	1	0	2	2	0	X	7
Sweden (Nygren)	0	0	0	1	0	0	2	X	3

Semifinals

Sheet A	1	2	3	4	5	6	7	8	Final
Canada (Fay)	0	0	2	3	0	1	0	1	7
Switzerland (Witschonke) 🔨	0	1	0	0	2	0	2	0	5

Bronze Medal Game

Sheet B	1	2	3	4	5	6	7	8	Final
Switzerland (Witschonke) 🔨	3	0	2	1	0	2	3	X	11
Russia (Karelina)	0	1	0	0	2	0	0	X	3

Final Rank: (bronze)

=== Mixed doubles ===
Athletes	Event	Round of 32	Round of 16	Quarterfinals	Semifinals	Final / BM	
Athletes	Event	Opposition Result	Opposition Result	Opposition Result	Opposition Result	Opposition Result	Rank
Yako Matsuzawa (JPN); Philipp Hoesli (SUI)	Mixed doubles	Mjoen (NOR); Mares (CZE); W 9 – 6	Sillaots (EST); Violette (USA); W 10 – 5	Thompson (NZL); Middleton (CAN); W 11 – 1	Zhao (CHN); Haarstad (NOR); W 7 – 6	Han (CHN); Whyte (GBR); W 11 – 5	1st place, gold medalist(s)
Courtney Smith (NZL); Henwy Lockmann (SUI)	Mixed doubles	Ramsfjell (NOR); Kim (KOR); L 4 – 10	did not advance				
Laura Engler (SUI); Victor Da Cunha Santos (BRA)	Mixed doubles	Zhao (CHN); Haarstad (NOR); L 1 – 9	did not advance				
Selina Witschonke (SUI); Jarl Gustsin (EST)	Mixed doubles	Ghezze (ITA); Mellemseter (NOR); W 9 – 3	Podrabska (CZE); Degerfeldt (SWE); W 11 – 1	Han (CHN); Whyte (GBR); L 5 – 6	did not advance		

== Freestyle skiing ==
Halfpipe

Athlete	Event	Final				
Athlete	Event	Run 1	Run 2	Run 3	Best	Rank
Mario Grob	Boys' halfpipe	51.60	64.00	35.20	64.00	6

Ski cross

Athlete	Event	Qualification		Group heats		Semifinal	Final
Athlete	Event	Time	Rank	Points	Rank	Position	Position
Sascha Rüedi	Boys' ski cross	44.32	7 Q	13	9	did not advance	
Talina Gantenbein	Girls' ski cross	45.76	2	17	2 Q	1 FA	1st place, gold medalist(s)

Slopestyle

Athlete	Event	Final			
Athlete	Event	Run 1	Run 2	Best	Rank
Mario Grob	Boys' slopestyle	42.80	45.20	45.20	17
Colin Wili	Boys' slopestyle	58.40	61.40	61.40	11
Mathilde Gremaud	Girls' slopestyle	58.20	12.80	58.20	6

== Ice hockey ==
=== Girls' tournament ===
Roster

- Sina Bachmann
- Sydney Berta
- Tina Brand
- Yaël Brich
- Oona Emmenegger
- Rahel Enzler
- Ramona Forrer
- Justine Forster
- Janine Hauser
- Saskia Maurer
- Lisa Rüedi
- Noemi Ryhner
- Jessica Schlegel
- Gionina Spiess
- Nicole Vallario
- Stefanie Wetli
- Lara Zimmermann

Group Stage

Pos	Team	Pld	W	OTW	OTL	L	GF	GA	GD	Pts	Qualification
1	Sweden	4	2	1	1	0	10	3	+7	9	Advance to semifinals
2	Czech Republic	4	3	0	0	1	7	4	+3	9	Advance to semifinals
3	Switzerland	4	2	1	0	1	10	6	+4	8	Advance to semifinals
4	Slovakia	4	1	0	1	2	6	9	−3	4	Advance to semifinals
5	Norway	4	0	0	0	4	2	13	−11	0	

Updated to match(es) played on 19 February 2016. Source: IIHF.com

13 February 2016; 20:00	Sweden	1–2 (1–0, 0–0, 0–1, 0-1)	Switzerland	Youth Hall

15 February 2016; 20:00	Switzerland	3–1 (1–0, 0–0, 2–1)	Norway	Youth Hall

16 February 2016; 17:00	Slovakia	2–4 (0–0, 1–3, 1–1)	Switzerland	Kristins Hall

18 February 2016; 14:00	Switzerland	1–2 (1–1, 0–0, 0–1)	Czech Republic	Youth Hall

Semifinals

19 February 2016; 14:00	Czech Republic	2–1 (1–0, 0–1, 0–0, 0–0, 1–0)	Switzerland	Youth Hall

Bronze medal game

20 February 2016; 17:00	Switzerland	5–2 (0–1, 3–0, 2–1)	Slovakia	Kristins Hall

Final Rank: (bronze)

== Skeleton ==
Athlete	Event	Run 1		Run 2		Total	
Athlete	Event	Time	Rank	Time	Rank	Time	Rank
Kevin Akeret	Boys	55.35	12	55.09	12	1:50.44	12

== Ski jumping ==
Athlete	Event	First round			Final			Total	
Athlete	Event	Distance	Points	Rank	Distance	Points	Rank	Points	Rank
Sandro Hauswirth	Boys' normal hill	87.0	102.8	11	83.0	92.7	13	195.5	11

== Snowboarding ==
Halfpipe

Athlete	Event	Final				
Athlete	Event	Run 1	Run 2	Run 3	Best	Rank
Wendelin Gauger	Boys' halfpipe	46.75	14.25	47.00	47.00	15
Gian Sutter	Boys' halfpipe	57.00	47.50	62.75	62.75	7
Ariane Burri	Girls' halfpipe	36.25	38.25	35.75	38.25	13

Snowboard cross

Athlete	Event	Qualification		Group heats		Semifinal	Final
Athlete	Event	Time	Rank	Points	Rank	Position	Position
Pascal Bitschnau	Boys' snowboard cross	48.62	5 Q	15	6 Q	3 FB	7
Sophie Hediger	Girls' snowboard cross	49.72	2 Q	19	2 Q	1 FA	2nd place, silver medalist(s)

Slopestyle

Athlete	Event	Final			
Athlete	Event	Run 1	Run 2	Best	Rank
Wendelin Gauger	Boys' slopestyle	46.00	25.25	46.00	16
Gian Sutter	Boys' slopestyle	40.50	76.50	76.50	8
Ariane Burri	Girls' slopestyle	did not start			

Snowboard and ski cross relay

Athlete	Event	Quarterfinal	Semifinal	Final
Athlete	Event	Position	Position	Position
Sophie Hediger; Talina Gantenbein; Pascal Bitschnau; Sascha Rüedi	Team snowboard ski cross	1 Q	2 FA	2nd place, silver medalist(s)

Qualification legend: FA – Qualify to medal round; FB – Qualify to consolation round

== Speed skating ==
Girls

Athlete	Event	Race 1		Race 2		Final	
Athlete	Event	Time	Rank	Time	Rank	Time	Rank
Jasmin Güntert	500 m	DSQ		did not advance			
Jasmin Güntert	1500 m	—N/a				2:19.84	25
Jasmin Güntert	Mass start	—N/a				5:56.68	13

Mixed team sprint

Athletes	Event	Final	
Athletes	Event	Time	Rank
Team 1 Jasmin Güntert (SUI); Kim Min-sun (KOR); Isa Izmailov (RUS); Jeffrey Rosanelli (ITA)	Mixed team sprint	1:59.75	7

== See also ==
- Switzerland at the 2016 Summer Olympics
