= Nathan Pare =

American snowboarder (born 2005)

Personal information
- Born: February 1, 2005 (age 21) Bethel, Maine, U.S.

Sport
- Country: United States
- Sport: Snowboarding
- Event: Snowboard cross
Medal record
Men's snowboarding
Representing the United States
Junior World Championships
Silver medal – second place	2025 Isola 2000	Snowboard cross
Bronze medal – third place	2025 Isola 2000	Mixed team snowboard cross

Nathan Pare (born February 1, 2005) is an American snowboarder specializing in snowboard cross. He represented the United States at the 2026 Winter Olympics.

== Early life and education ==
Pare attended Gould Academy in Bethel, Maine He then completed a postgraduate program at Carrabassett Valley Academy.

== Career ==
In March 2024, Pare suffered a broken jaw that required his jaw being wired shut. He was named the 2024 FIS World Cup Snowboard Cross Rookie of the Year.

During the 2024–25 FIS Snowboard World Cup, he earned his first career World Cup podium on April 5, 2025, finishing in third place. He then competed at the 2025 FIS Snowboarding Junior World Championships and won a silver medal in the snowboard cross and a bronze medal in the mixed team snowboard cross, along with Brianna Schnorrbusch.

He made his FIS Snowboard World Championships debut in 2025 and finished in sixth place. In January 2026, he was selected to represent the United States at the 2026 Winter Olympics. Pare was disqualified from his initial win during the snowboarding cross racing quarterfinals at the 2026 Olympics. The win would have placed him in the semifinals and a chance at an Olympic medal. Although Pare was not cited for doing anything wrong while running the race, the call claimed that he had moved off his line; which resulted in him hitting another racer. “To have a call like that, at the Olympics, pretty much stripping it away from me, it’s hard to deal with,” said Pare.
