= Snowboarding at the 2016 Winter Youth Olympics – Boys' snowboard cross =

Boys' snowboard cross at the II Winter Youth Olympic Games
- Venue: Hafjell Freepark
- Dates: 15 February 2016
- Competitors: 17 from 17 nations

Medalists
1st place, gold medalist(s)		Jake Vedder	United States
2nd place, silver medalist(s)		Alex Dickson	Australia
3rd place, bronze medalist(s)		Sebastian Pietrzykowski	Germany

The boys' snowboard cross event at the 2016 Winter Youth Olympics took place on 15 February 2016 at the Hafjell Freepark.

== Results ==
=== Qualification ===
The qualification was held at 9:30.

Rank	Bib	Name	Country	Run 1	Rank	Run 2	Rank	Best Time	Notes
1	4	Sebastian Pietrzykowski	Germany	47.90	1			47.90	Q
2	16	Jake Vedder	United States	47.91	2			47.91	Q
3	2	Alex Dickson	Australia	47.93	3			47.93	Q
4	7	Evan Bichon	Canada	48.09	4			48.09	Q
5	17	Pascal Bitschnau	Switzerland	48.62	5			48.62	Q
6	14	Merlin Surget	France	49.23	6			49.23	Q
7	12	Vasily Loktev-Zagorskiy	Russia	49.56	7			49.56	Q
8	13	Marco Dornhofer	Austria	49.71	8			49.71	Q
9	15	Matouš Koudelka	Czech Republic	49.87	10	49.35	1	49.35	Q
10	10	Yoshiki Takahara	Japan	49.85	9	49.39	2	49.39	Q
11	5	Muhammed İkbal Yılmaz	Turkey	49.92	11	50.87	5	49.92	Q
12	6	Herman Møller Svendsen	Norway	50.32	12	49.94	3	49.94	Q
13	8	Tit Štante	Slovenia	50.64	13	50.69	4	50.64	Q
14	3	Valentin Miladinov	Bulgaria	50.96	14	52.27	7	50.96	Q
15	9	Aarón Stoeff	Argentina	51.75	15	52.07	6	51.75	Q
16	1	Aras Arlauskas	Lithuania	52.11	16	54.36	8	52.11	Q
17	11	Csongor Szász	Hungary	56.70	17	54.68	9	54.68	

=== Group heats ===
Rank	Bib	Athlete	Country	Group 1				Group 2				Group 3				Group 4				Group 5				Total
Rank	Bib	Athlete	Country	1	2	3	4	5	6	7	8	9	10	11	12	13	14	15	16	17	18	19	20	Total
1	2	Jake Vedder	United States	4					4				4				4				4			20
2	1	Sebastian Pietrzykowski	Germany	3				3				4				4				4				18
3	4	Evan Bichon	Canada	2							4				4				4				4	18
4	3	Alex Dickson	Australia	1						4				4				4				4		17
5	10	Yoshiki Takahara	Japan			4			3						2			3		3				15
6	5	Pascal Bitschnau	Switzerland		4			4					3					1					3	15
7	6	Merlin Surget	France		2				2			3							3			3		13
8	7	Vasily Loktev-Zagorskiy	Russia		1					3					3	3					3			13
9	8	Marco Dornhofer	Austria		3						2			3			3			2				13
10	12	Herman Møller Svendsen	Norway			3					3		1			2						2		11
11	9	Matouš Koudelka	Czech Republic			2		2						2					2		1			9
12	11	Muhammed İkbal Yılmaz	Turkey			DNF				2		2					2						2	8
13	14	Valentin Miladinov	Bulgaria				4		1					1		1							1	8
14	16	Aras Arlauskas	Lithuania				2				1	1						2			2			8
15	13	Tit Štante	Slovenia				3	1							1		DNF					1		6
16	15	Aarón Stoeff	Argentina				1			1			2						1	1				6

=== Semifinals ===
Heat 1

Rank	Bib	Name	Country	Notes
1	2	Jake Vedder	United States	BF
2	3	Alex Dickson	Australia	BF
3	10	Yoshiki Takahara	Japan	SF
4	7	Vasily Loktev-Zagorskiy	Russia	SF

Heat 2

Rank	Bib	Name	Country	Notes
1	1	Sebastian Pietrzykowski	Germany	BF
2	4	Evan Bichon	Canada	BF
3	5	Pascal Bitschnau	Switzerland	SF
4	6	Merlin Surget	France	SF

=== Finals ===
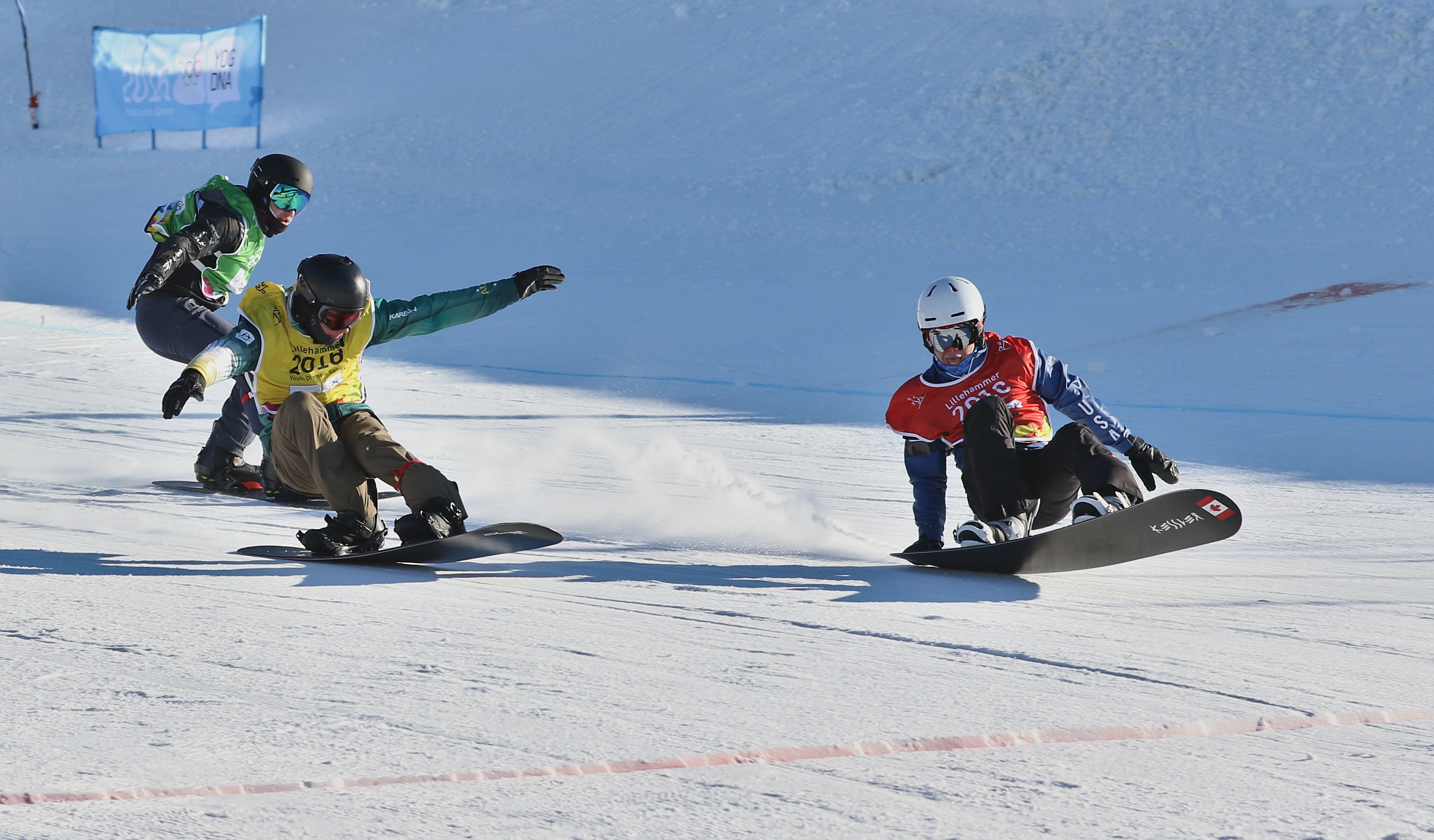
Vedder (red), Dickson (yellow) and Pietrzykowski (green) during the finals.

The final was held at 11:38.

Small final

Rank	Bib	Name	Country	Notes
5	10	Yoshiki Takahara	Japan	
6	7	Vasily Loktev-Zagorskiy	Russia	
7	5	Pascal Bitschnau	Switzerland	
8	6	Merlin Surget	France	

Big final

Rank	Bib	Name	Country	Notes
1st place, gold medalist(s)	2	Jake Vedder	United States	
2nd place, silver medalist(s)	3	Alex Dickson	Australia	
3rd place, bronze medalist(s)	1	Sebastian Pietrzykowski	Germany	
4	4	Evan Bichon	Canada	
