= Freestyle skiing at the 2016 Winter Youth Olympics – Girls' ski cross =

Girls' ski cross at the II Winter Youth Olympic Games
- Venue: Hafjell Freepark
- Dates: 15 February
- Competitors: 16 from 16 nations

Medalists
1st place, gold medalist(s)		Talina Gantenbein	Switzerland
2nd place, silver medalist(s)		Zali Offord	Australia
3rd place, bronze medalist(s)		Klára Kašparová	Czech Republic

The girls' ski cross event at the 2016 Winter Youth Olympics took place on 15 February at the Hafjell Freepark.

== Results ==
=== Qualification ===
Rank	Bib	Name	Country	Time	Difference
1	11	Klára Kašparová	Czech Republic	45.48	
2	6	Talina Gantenbein	Switzerland	45.76	+0.28
3	8	Zoe Chore	Canada	45.93	+0.45
4	14	Zali Offord	Australia	46.26	+0.78
5	16	Veronica Edebo	Sweden	46.31	+0.83
6	10	Dana Vovk	Russia	47.04	+1.56
7	1	Celia Funkler	Germany	47.22	+1.74
8	4	Martina Rainer	Austria	47.34	+1.86
9	15	Nicoline Nielsen	Denmark	47.35	+1.87
10	3	Minja Lehikoinen	Finland	47.58	+2.10
11	13	Abigail Zagnoli	United States	47.85	+2.37
12	12	Margot Tresal Mauroz	France	48.00	+2.52
13	2	Magdalena Casas	Chile	48.22	+2.74
14	7	Isobel Brown	Great Britain	48.69	+3.21
15	5	Aizhan Sapiyanova	Kazakhstan	50.37	+4.89
16	9	Ebba Ruud	Norway	50.39	+4.91

=== Group heats ===
Rank	Bib	Athlete	Country	Group 1				Group 2				Group 3				Group 4				Group 5				Total
Rank	Bib	Athlete	Country	1	2	3	4	5	6	7	8	9	10	11	12	13	14	15	16	17	18	19	20	Total
1	5	Veronica Edebo	Sweden		4			4					4					2					4	18
2	2	Talina Gantenbein	Switzerland	2					4				3				4				4			17
3	3	Zoe Chore	Canada	1						4				4				4				4		17
4	4	Zali Offord	Australia	3							4				4				4				2	17
5	7	Celia Funkler	Germany		3					3					3	3					3			15
6	9	Nicoline Nielsen	Denmark			4		3						3					3		2			15
7	1	Klára Kašparová	Czech Republic	4				DNF				4				4				2				14
8	10	Minja Lehikoinen	Finland			1			3						2			3		4				13
9	11	Abigail Zagnoli	United States			2				2		2					3						3	12
10	8	Martina Rainer	Austria		2						3			2			2			3				12
11	6	Dana Vovk	Russia		1				2			3										3		11
12	13	Magdalena Casas	Chile				4	2							1		1					2		10
13	12	Margot Tresal Mauroz	France			3					DNF		2			2						DNF		7
14	15	Aizhan Sapiyanova	Kazakhstan				3			1			1						1	1				7
15	16	Ebba Ruud	Norway				2				2	1						1			1			7
16	14	Isobel Brown	Great Britain				1		1					DNF		DNS							DNS	2

=== Semifinals ===
Heat 1

Rank	Bib	Name	Country	Notes
1	4	Zali Offord	Australia	BF
2	7	Celia Funkler	Germany	BF
3	5	Veronica Edebo	Sweden	SF
4	10	Minja Lehikoinen	Finland	SF

Heat 2

Rank	Bib	Name	Country	Notes
1	2	Talina Gantenbein	Switzerland	BF
2	1	Klára Kašparová	Czech Republic	BF
3	3	Zoe Chore	Canada	SF
4	9	Nicoline Nielsen	Denmark	SF

=== Finals ===
Small final

Rank	Bib	Name	Country	Notes
5	5	Veronica Edebo	Sweden	
6	3	Zoe Chore	Canada	
7	9	Nicoline Nielsen	Denmark	
8	10	Minja Lehikoinen	Finland	

Big final

Rank	Bib	Name	Country	Notes
1st place, gold medalist(s)	2	Talina Gantenbein	Switzerland	
2nd place, silver medalist(s)	4	Zali Offord	Australia	
3rd place, bronze medalist(s)	1	Klára Kašparová	Czech Republic	
4	7	Celia Funkler	Germany	DNF
