= Lithuania at the 2016 Winter Youth Olympics =

- IOC code: LTU
- NOC: Lithuanian National Olympic Committee
- Website: www.ltok.lt (in Lithuanian and English)

in Lillehammer
- Competitors: 10 in 6 sports
- Flag bearer: Deividas Kizala
- Medals: Gold 0 Silver 0 Bronze 0 Total 0

Winter Youth Olympics appearances (overview)
- 2012; 2016; 2020; 2024

Lithuania competed at the 2016 Winter Youth Olympics in Lillehammer, Norway from 12 to 21 February 2016.

Lithuania was represented by 10 athletes: Nadiežda Derendiajeva, Vitalija Kutkauskaitė and Linas Banys in biathlon, Rokas Vaitkus in cross-country skiing, Andrejus Driukarovas and Eglė Augustaitytė in alpine skiing, Dino Mukovozas in ice hockey, Aras Arlauskas in snowboarding, Guostė Damulevičiūtė and Deividas Kizala in figure skating.

== Alpine skiing ==
Boys

| Athlete | Event | Run 1 | | Run 2 | | Total | |
| Athlete | Event | Time | Rank | Time | Rank | Time | Rank |
|---|---|---|---|---|---|---|---|
| Andrej Drukarov | Slalom | - | DNF | - | DNS | - | DNF |
| Andrej Drukarov | Giant slalom | 1:24.13 | 32nd | 1:23.53 | 27th | 2:47.66 | 27th |
| Andrej Drukarov | Super-G | — | | | | 1:15.10 (+4.48) | 35th |
| Andrej Drukarov | Combined | - | DNF | - | DNS | - | DNF |

Girls

| Athlete | Event | Run 1 | | Run 2 | | Total | |
| Athlete | Event | Time | Rank | Time | Rank | Time | Rank |
|---|---|---|---|---|---|---|---|
| Eglė Augustaitytė | Slalom | - | DNF | - | DNS | - | DNF |
| Eglė Augustaitytė | Giant slalom | 48.26 | 34th | 1:28.05 | 30th | 2:59.43 | 30th |

== Biathlon ==
Boys

| Athlete | Event | Time | Misses | Rank |
|---|---|---|---|---|
| Linas Banys | Sprint | 20:20.9 | 1 | 13 |
| Linas Banys | Pursuit | 33:43.2 | 7 | 31 |

Girls

| Athlete | Event | Time | Misses | Rank |
|---|---|---|---|---|
| Nadežda Derendiajeva | Sprint | 22:52.6 | 4 | 47 |
| Nadežda Derendiajeva | Pursuit | 39:05.6 | 15 | 47 |
| Vitalija Kutkauskaitė | Sprint | 22:03.1 | 1 | 44 |
| Vitalija Kutkauskaitė | Pursuit | 31:27.7 | 1 | 38 |

Mixed

| Athletes | Event | Time | Misses | Rank |
|---|---|---|---|---|
| Nadezda Derendiajeva; Linas Banys | Single mixed relay | 48:13.7 | 5+18 | 25 |

== Cross-country skiing ==
Boys

| Athlete | Event | Qualification | | Quarterfinal | | Semifinal | | Final | |
| Athlete | Event | Time | Rank | Time | Rank | Time | Rank | Time | Rank |
|---|---|---|---|---|---|---|---|---|---|
| Rokas Vaitkus | 10 km freestyle | — | | | | | | 26:37.4 | 32 |
| Rokas Vaitkus | Classical sprint | 3:14.99 (+18.87) | 31st | did not advance | | | | | |
| Rokas Vaitkus | Cross-country cross | 3:16.71 (+15.26) | 21st Q | — | | 3:20.93 (+18.58) | 10th | Did not advance | 23rd |

== Figure skating ==
Couples

| Athletes | Event | SP/SD | | FS/FD | | Total | |
| Athletes | Event | Points | Rank | Points | Rank | Points | Rank |
|---|---|---|---|---|---|---|---|
| Guostė Damulevičiūtė; Deividas Kizala | Ice dancing | 44.58 | 7th Q | 60.94 | 8th | 105.52 | 9th |

Mixed NOC team trophy

| Athletes | Event | Free skate/Free dance | | | | | |
| Athletes | Event | Ice dance | Pairs | Girls | Boys | Total | |
| Athletes | Event | Points Team points | Points Team points | Points Team points | Points Team points | Points | Rank |
|---|---|---|---|---|---|---|---|
| Team Motivation; Guoste Damuleviciute / Deividas Kizala (LTU); Ekaterina Borisova / Dmitry Sopot (RUS); Byun Ji-hyun (KOR); Chew Kai Xiang (MAS) | Team trophy | 55.56; 2 | 104.80; 8 | 99.94; 6 | 86.56; 2 | 18 | 4 |

== Ice hockey ==
| Athlete | Event | Qualification | | Final | |
| Athlete | Event | Points | Rank | Points | Rank |
|---|---|---|---|---|---|
| Dino Mukovoz | Boys' individual skills challenge | 10 pts | 8th Q | 10 pts | 6th |

== Snowboarding ==
Snowboard cross

| Athlete | Event | Qualification | | Group heats | | Semifinal | Final |
| Athlete | Event | Time | Rank | Points | Rank | Position | Position |
|---|---|---|---|---|---|---|---|
| Aras Arlauskas | Boys' snowboard cross | 52.11 | 16 Q | 8 | 14 | did not advance | |

Snowboard and ski cross relay

| Athlete | Event | Quarterfinal | Semifinal | Final |
| Athlete | Event | Position | Position | Position |
|---|---|---|---|---|
| Manon Petit (FRA); Margot Tresal Mauroz (FRA); Aras Arlauskas (LTU); Matteo Lucatelli (FRA) | Team snowboard ski cross | 2 Q | 3 FB | 7 |

Qualification legend: FA – Qualify to medal round; FB – Qualify to consolation round

== See also ==
- Lithuania at the 2016 Summer Olympics
