= Logan Sankey =

American ski jumper (born 1998)

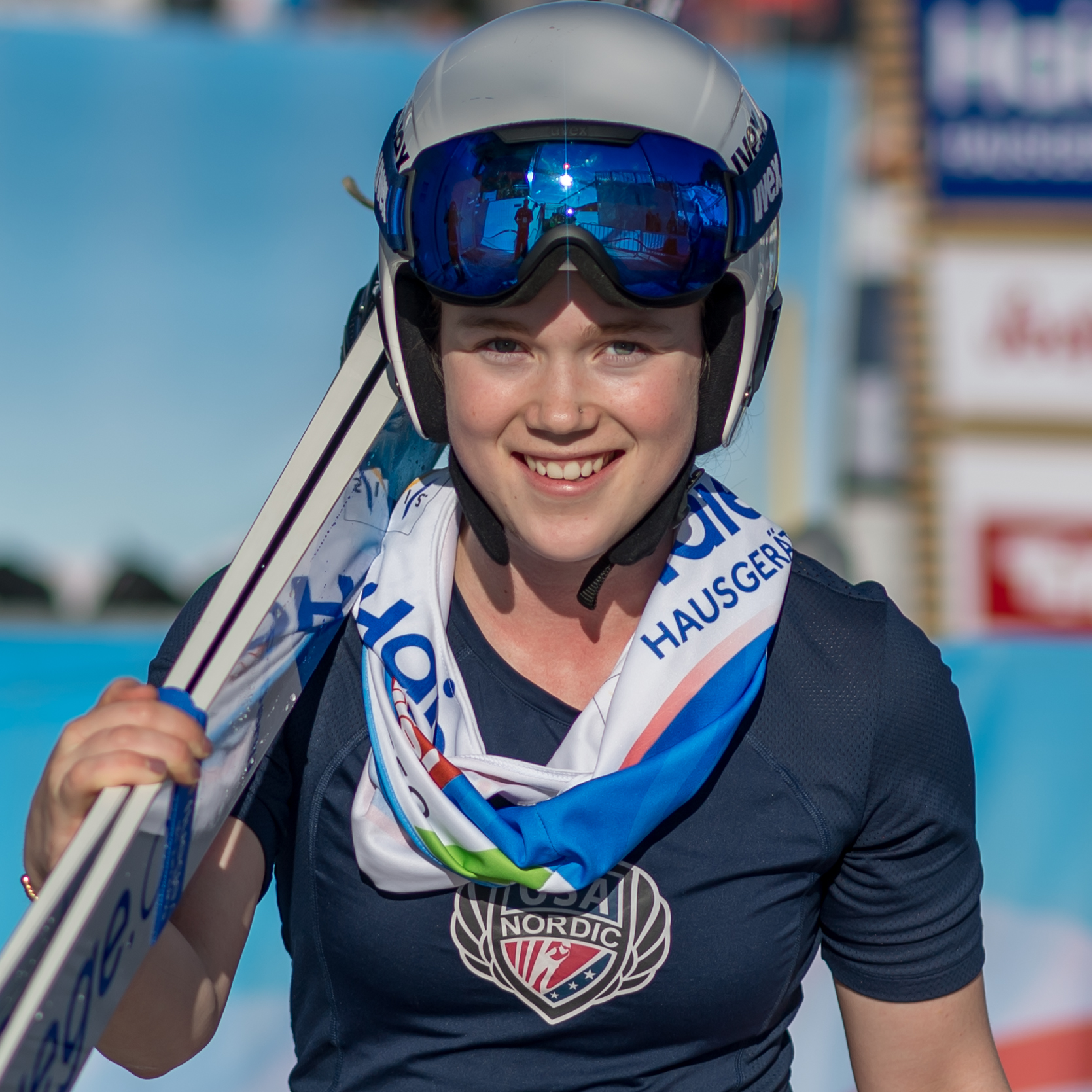
Logan Sankey

Logan Sankey (born 1998) is an American ski jumper on the United States Women's National Ski Jumping Team.

== Personal life ==
Logan Sankey was born on May 28, 1998, in Denver, Colorado. Logan has been skiing essentially her entire life, as her dad taught her how to ski when she was just two years old. Logan lived and skied in Denver for the first 13 years of her life. Her family then moved to Steamboat, Colorado, so that she could join the prestigious Steamboat Springs Winter Sports Club alpine race team. Logan graduated from Steamboat Springs High School in 2016 and is now attending Dartmouth College. She plans to graduate in the spring of 2023 with a mechanical engineering degree.

Logan's parents are Kevin and Laura Sankey, and she has two siblings named Colton and Nolan. She teaches at an elementary school in her hometown of Steamboat Springs, Colorado.

== Skiing career ==
Logan's main focus in her early career was alpine ski racing. However, she attended the Hitchens Brother's Wednesday Night Jump Series around the time she started high school and immediately fell in love with ski jumping. As she put it, "Imagine the biggest thrill you have ever experienced. Now multiply that by about hundred and then by hundred again and then again, and you might understand what it feels like every time I jump." She would compete in both alpine ski racing and ski jumping until 2014, when she committed to ski jumping full time. She attended the Fly Girls camp in 2014 and credits this with the reason she would focus solely on ski jumping for the remainder of her career. This camp also made her want to take her ski jumping career to the next level. In 2015 she would do exactly this when she joined the U.S. Women's National Ski Jumping Team as a junior in high school.

Many of her notable results in competition to date came during her high school and college years. In 2014 she competed in her first U.S. Junior National Championship. At this competition, she placed 3rd in the ski jumping/Nordic combined event and 5th in the normal hill event. Her first competition with Team USA came at the 2015 FIS Continental Cup Falun, where she placed 11th in the HS100 discipline. On February 5, 2015, she competed in her first ever FIS Junior World Ski Championships in Kazakhstan, where she placed 30th. She followed this result with a 12th place finish at the 2016 Youth Olympic Winter Games in Norway. She would return to the FIS Junior World Ski Championships in 2016 and place 30th once again. Other achievements include a 38th place finish at the FIS Junior World Ski Championships in 2017, a 37th place finish at the 2018 World Cup, a 20th place finish at the FIS Junior World Ski Championships in 2018, a 43rd, 36th, and 53rd place finish in three different events at the 2019 World Cup, an 11th place finish at the 2020 World Cup, a 12th place finish at the 2021 World Cup, a 10th place finish at the 2021 World Ski Championships, a 9th place finish at the 2021 World Cup, and a 43rd place finish at the 2022 World Cup. She recently won a professional event for the first time, as she took first place at the 2022 Continental Cup in the HS100 discipline. She continues to compete in 2022.

She has competed at the World Junior Championship four times, the World Championships twice, and one Youth Olympic Games. She also earned four bronze medals at Junior Nationals for ski jumping.

== 2022 Olympics and gender equality ==
Logan had a large media presence leading up to the 2022 Beijing Olympics. The first reason is she was one of three American women to have a chance at competing in the Olympics. Annika Belshaw, Anna Hoffmann, and Logan Sankey took the top three spots at the U.S. trials and would advance to the Olympic trials. However, after a disappointing performance, none of the athletes advanced to the Olympics. Prior to the event, Sankey was quoted saying "To go to Beijing and have the culmination of the goal I had before I even knew it was a goal, I think I would be incredibly proud of myself." She then said "Whether or not I go to this specific Olympics it's important for me to remember, and to know that sport, in general, has given me so much and will continue to give me so much—and that is not contingent on me being a 2022 Beijing Olympian." Clearly she had high hopes for the 2022 Winter Olympics, but she has continued competing despite the disappointing results.

She has used her platform surrounding the Olympics to continue fighting for equality in the sport. Women historically have not been able to compete in ski jumping at the Olympics because it was "not appropriate for ladies from a medical point of view." This did not stop the Americans from continuing to practice ski jumping and they eventually were ranked the number one team in the world in 2012. The breakthrough came in 2014, as women were allowed to compete at the Sochi Olympic Games for the first time. Sankey sees inequalities even today, stating that "we don't have the same number of events [as the men] in the Olympics still, and we don't have equal prize money on the world cup circuit. So making sure that no young girl or young woman decides not to become a ski jumper because of that inequality is important to me." Furthermore, until 2020 every woman had to have extra panels sewn into their jump suits around their hips. The International Ski Federation claimed it would help women fit their suits better, but there was no merit to this claim and made it even harder to create suits for women. Sankey knows there is plenty of work to be done to achieve full equality in the sport and has pledged to continue working for equality while improving her ski jumps.
