= Yoshiki Takahara =

Japanese snowboarder (born 1998)

Personal information
- Nationality: Japanese
- Born: 17 January 1998 (age 28) Sakai, Japan

Sport
- Sport: Snowboarding
- Event: Snowboard cross
Medal record
Representing Japan
Winter Universiade
Bronze medal – third place	2019 Krasnoyarsk	Snowboard cross

Yoshiki Takahara (Japanese: 高原 宜希, born 17 January 1998) is a Japanese snowboarder who competed at the 2022 Winter Olympics.

== Career ==
Takahara represented Japan at the 2016 Winter Youth Olympics in the snowboard cross and finished in fifth place, winning the small final.

He represented Japan at the 2022 Winter Olympics in the snowboard cross event.
