= Jake Pates =

American snowboarder (born 1998)

Personal information
- Born: July 30, 1998 (age 27) Boulder, Colorado, U.S.
- Height: 5 ft 7 in (170 cm)
- Weight: 150 lb (68 kg)

Sport
- Country: United States
- Sport: Snowboarding
- Event: Halfpipe
- Club: Aspen Valley Ski & Snowboard Club
Medal record
Men's snowboarding
Representing United States
Winter X Games
Silver medal – second place	2020 Aspen	SuperPipe Session
Laax Open
Bronze medal – third place	2019 Laax	Halfpipe
Youth Olympic Games
Gold medal – first place	2016 Lillehammer	Halfpipe
Gold medal – first place	2016 Lillehammer	Slopestyle

Jake Pates (born July 30, 1998) is an American snowboarder. He competed in the Halfpipe at the 2018 and 2026 Winter Olympics, finishing in 8th place both times. He won two gold medals at the 2016 Youth Olympic Games in Lillehammer in the Halfpipe and Slopestyle competitions. His most recent World Championship experience was in 2019, finishing 28th in men's Halfpipe. In 2020, he won a silver medal at the Winter X Games in Aspen, Colorado in the Superpipe Session contest.
