= Denmark at the 2016 Winter Youth Olympics =

- IOC code: DEN
- NOC: Denmark Olympic Committee
- Website: www.dif.dk

in Lillehammer
- Competitors: 4 in 3 sports
- Medals: Gold 0 Silver 0 Bronze 0 Total 0

Winter Youth Olympics appearances
- 2012; 2016; 2020; 2024

Denmark competed at the 2016 Winter Youth Olympics in Lillehammer, Norway from 12 to 21 February 2016.

== Alpine skiing ==
Boys

Athlete	Event	Run 1		Run 2		Total	
Athlete	Event	Time	Rank	Time	Rank	Time	Rank
Marcus Vorre	Slalom	51.30	12	50.15	6	1:41.45	8
Marcus Vorre	Giant slalom	DNF		did not advance			
Marcus Vorre	Super-G	—N/a				1:11.31	5
Marcus Vorre	Combined	1:12.43	5	did not finish			

Girls

Athlete	Event	Run 1		Run 2		Total	
Athlete	Event	Time	Rank	Time	Rank	Time	Rank
Ida Broens	Slalom	1:03.57	28	59.53	24	2:03.10	24
Ida Broens	Giant slalom	1:26.85	27	1:21.00	21	2:47.85	23
Ida Broens	Super-G	—N/a				1:16.52	17
Ida Broens	Combined	1:19.14	26	did not finish			

== Cross-country skiing ==
Boys

Athlete	Event	Qualification		Quarterfinal		Semifinal		Final	
Athlete	Event	Time	Rank	Time	Rank	Time	Rank	Time	Rank
Herman Valset	10 km freestyle	—N/a						28:25.0	45
Herman Valset	Classical sprint	3:15.09	32	did not advance					
Herman Valset	Cross-country cross	3:41.52	46	—N/a		did not advance			

== Freestyle skiing ==
Ski cross

Athlete	Event	Qualification		Group heats		Semifinal	Final
Athlete	Event	Time	Rank	Points	Rank	Position	Position
Nicoline Nielsen	Girls' ski cross	47.35	9	15	6 Q	4 FB	7

== See also ==
- Denmark at the 2016 Summer Olympics
