= Jake Vedder =

American snowboarder (born 1998)

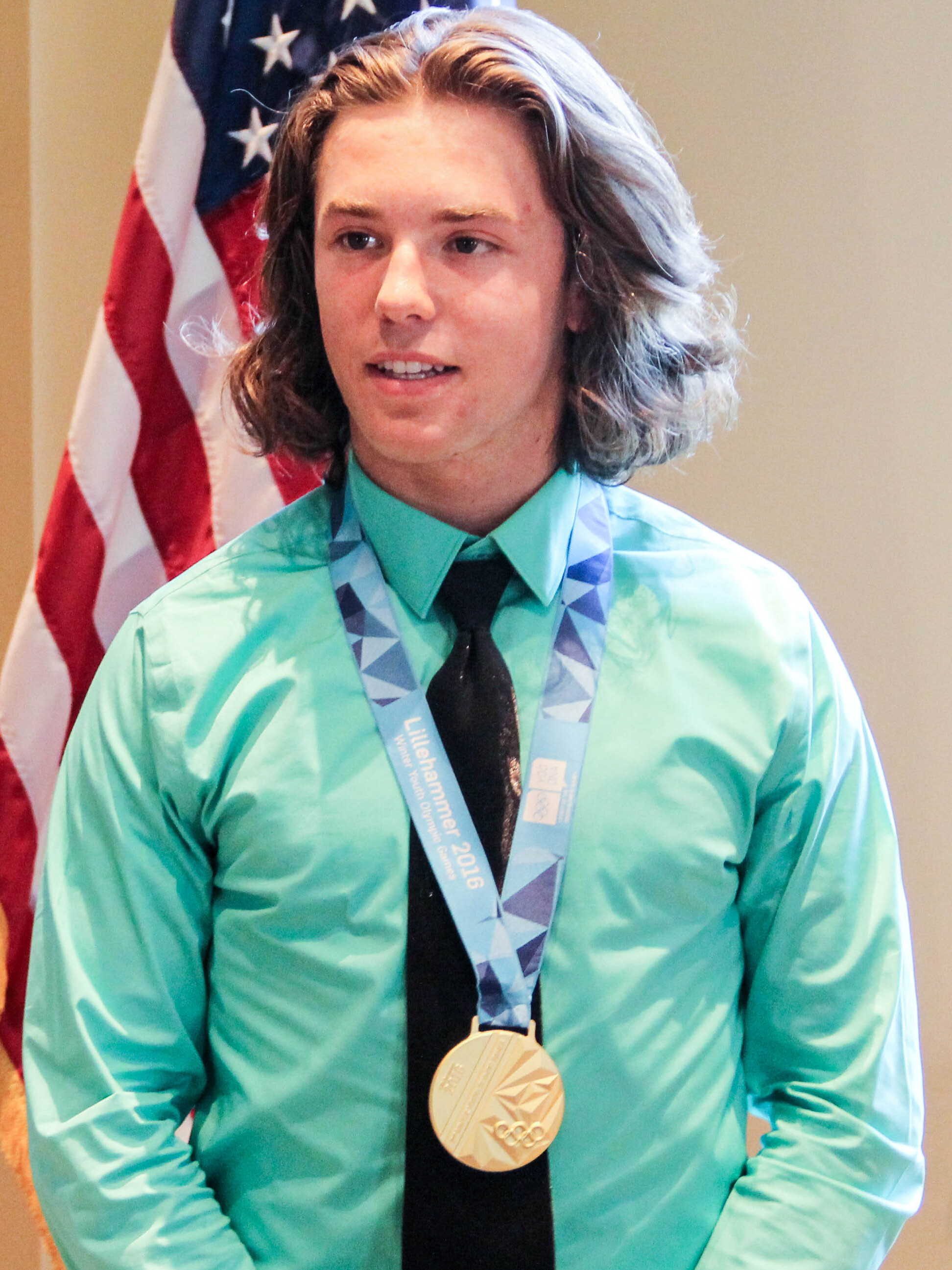

Personal information
- Born: April 16, 1998 (age 28) Pinckney, Michigan, U.S.
- Height: 5 ft 9 in (175 cm)

Sport
- Country: United States
- Sport: Snowboarding
- Event: Snowboard cross
Medal record
Winter Youth Olympics
Gold medal – first place	2016 Lillehammer	Snowboard cross
Junior World Championships
Silver medal – second place	2018 Cardrona	Snowboard cross

Jake Vedder (born April 16, 1998) is an American snowboarder who competes internationally in the snowboard cross discipline. He represented the United States at the 2022 Winter Olympics.

== Career ==
Vedder represented the United States at the 2016 Winter Youth Olympics where he won a gold medal in the snowboard cross event. He also competed at the 2019 FIS Snowboarding Junior World Championships and won a silver medal.

He represented the United States at the 2022 Winter Olympics as an alternate in the snowboard cross event, replacing an injured Alex Deibold, finishing in sixth place.

Vedder would represent the United States again in the 2026 Winter Olympics in the snowboard cross. Vedder would finish 11th, getting eliminated in the quarterfinals of the elimination rounds, finishing third in a four-person heat (where the top two advance) behind subsequent gold medalist Alessandro Hämmerle and silver medal winner Éliot Grondin.
