= Madison Rowlands =

British freestyle skier

Personal information
- Nationality: British
- Born: 2000 (age 25–26) United Kingdom

Sport
- Country: Great Britain
- Sport: Freestyle skiing
Medal record
Women's freestyle skiing
Representing Great Britain
Winter Youth Olympics
Gold medal – first place	2016 Lillehammer	Halfpipe
Bronze medal – third place	2016 Lillehammer	Slopestyle

Madison Rowlands is a British freestyle skier. At the 2016 Winter Youth Olympics, she won two medals for Great Britain, including Britain first Winter Youth Olympic Gold medal. She was due to compete at the 2018 Winter Olympics, but was injured earlier in the year.
