= Marco Ladner =

Austrian freestyle skier

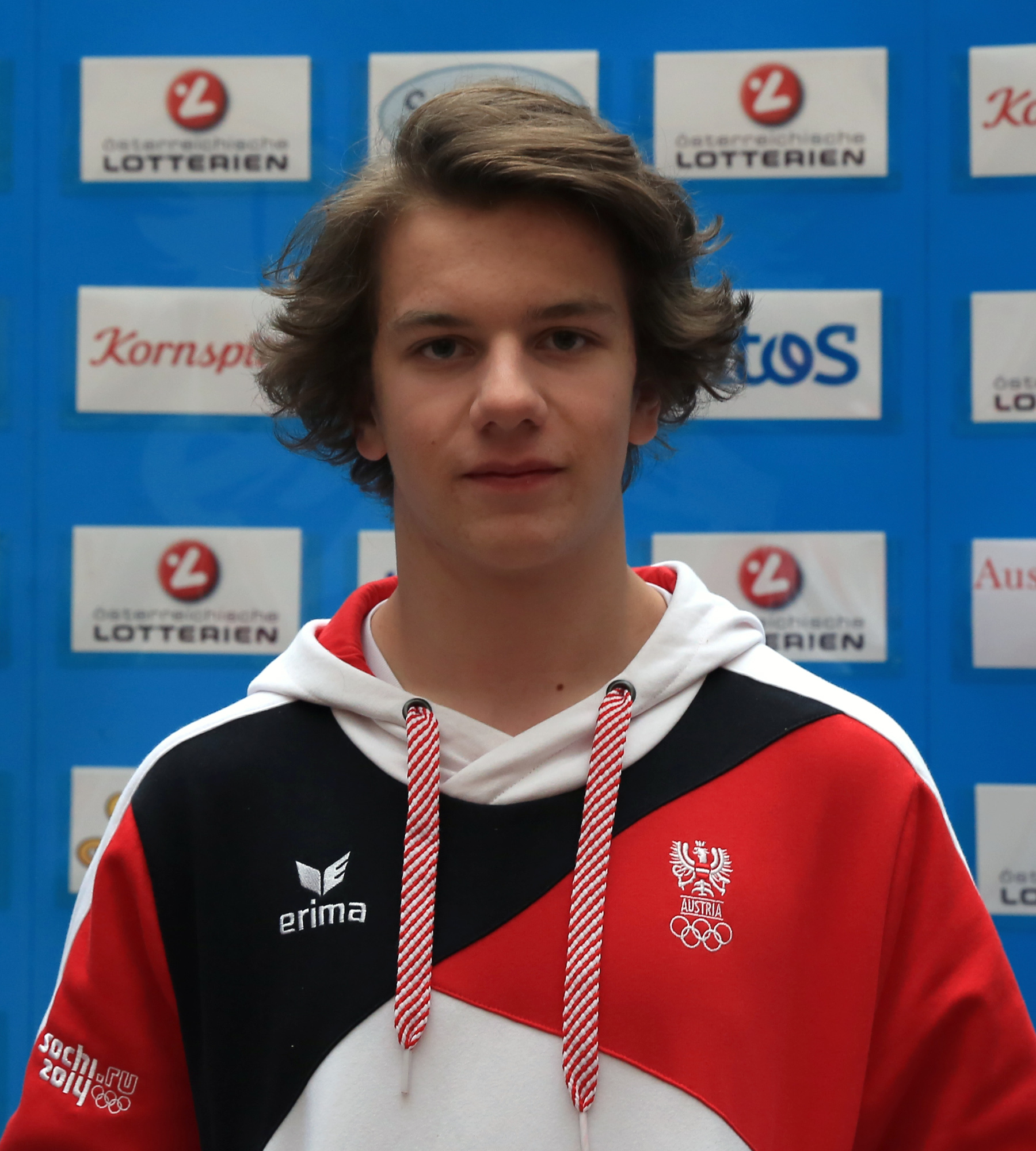
- Ladner in 2014

Personal information
- Born: 22 April 1998 (age 28) Zams, Austria
- Height: 175 cm (5 ft 9 in)

Sport
- Sport: Skiing

Marco Ladner (born 22 April 1998 in Zams) is an Austrian freestyle skier, specializing in halfpipe.

Ladner competed at the 2014 Winter Olympics for Austria. He placed 19th in the qualifying round in the halfpipe, failing to advance.

He made his World Cup debut in August 2012. As of April 2014, his best World Cup finish is 9th, at Calgary in 2013–14. His best World Cup overall finish in halfpipe is 24th, in 2013–14.

Ladner also competed at the 2018 Winter Olympics and 2022 Winter Olympics.
