= Lee Min-sik =

South Korean snowboarder (born 2000)

Personal information
- Nationality: South Korean
- Born: 5 July 2000 (age 25) South Korea
- Education: Choengmyeong High School
- Height: 169 cm (5 ft 7 in)

Sport
- Country: South Korea
- Sport: Snowboarding
- Coached by: Lee Sang-heon
Medal record
Men's snowboarding
Representing South Korea
Winter Universiade
Gold medal – first place	2023 Lake Placid	Slopestyle

Korean name
- Hangul: 이민식
- RR: I Minsik
- MR: I Minsik

Lee Min-sik (born 5 July 2000) is a South Korean snowboarder. Lee competed at the 2018 Winter Olympics for South Korea.
