= Tryvann Ski Resort =

Ski resort in Oslo, Norway

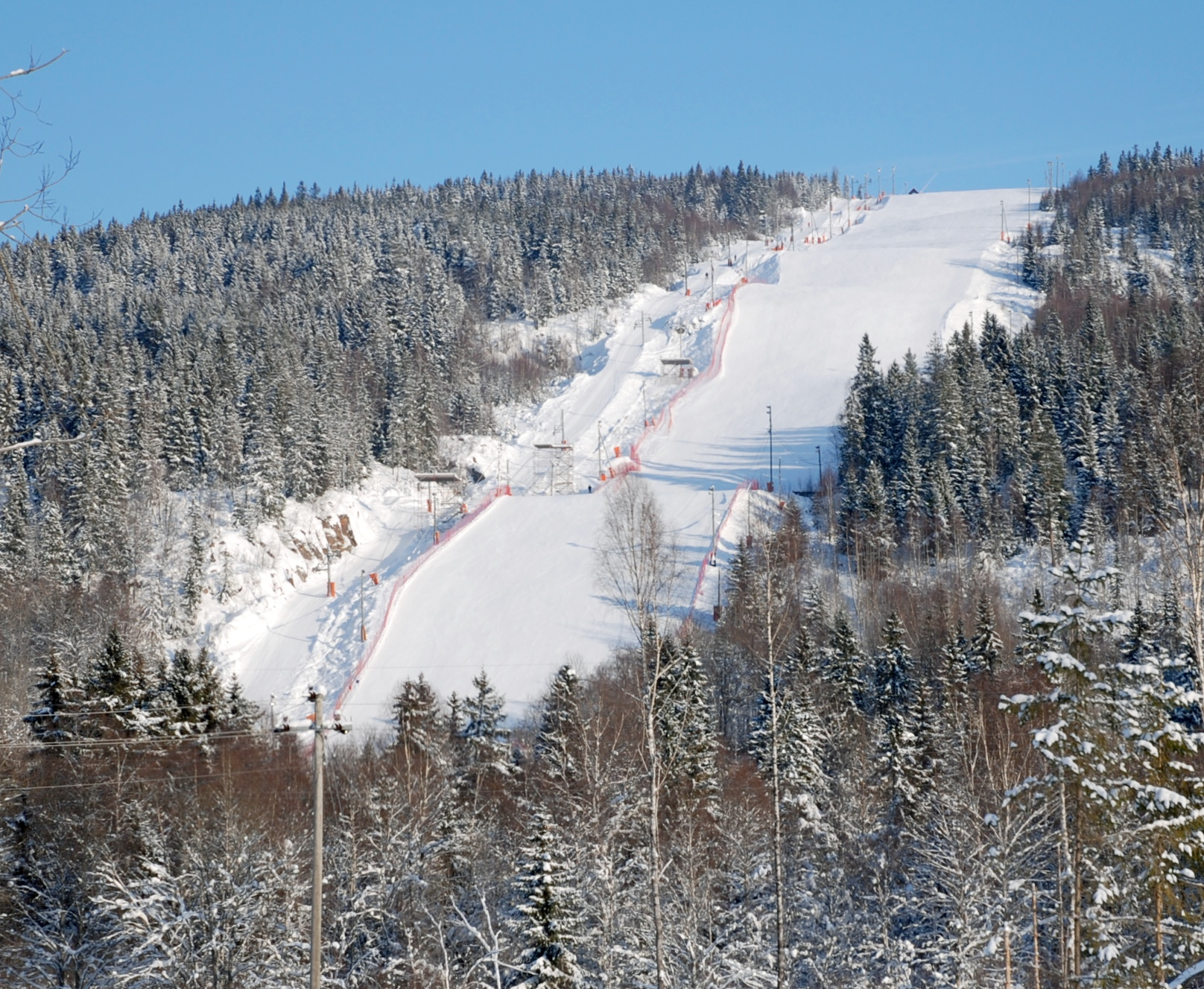
- The ski slope Wyllerløypa
- Interactive map of Tryvann Ski Resort
- Nearest city: Oslo
- Coordinates: 59°59′22″N 10°40′05″E
- Vertical: 381 m (1,250 ft)
- Top elevation: 531 m (1,742 ft)
- Base elevation: 150 m (490 ft)
- Longest run: 1.3 km (0.81 mi)
- Total length: 9.6 km (6.0 mi)
- Lift system: 9

The Oslo Winter Park at Tryvann (Norwegian: Oslo Vinterpark) is a ski resort in Oslo, Norway. It is the most used ski resort of Norway. In the 1930s, the ski slope Tryvannskleiva was constructed, and the first race was held in 1933. The ski slope was later expanded with Tommkleiva, Wyllerløypa and finally with Tryvann Ski Resort. As of winter of 2010, the resort has 14 slopes and 7 lifts. There is only 1.2 km (0.75 mi) walking or bus distance from the Voksenkollen metro station.

== Ski slopes ==
Ski slope	Length in meters
Wyllerløypa	1300
Tårnbakken	900
Tryvannskleiva	400
Vestkleiva	200
Tommkleiva	200
Mellomkleiva	200
Veslekleiva	200
Hyttli-trassæerne	approx. 650
