= Rakai Tait =

New Zealand snowboarder (born 1998)

Personal information
- Born: 11 December 1998 (age 27) Santa Cruz, California, United States

Sport
- Country: New Zealand
- Sport: Snowboarding
- Event: Halfpipe

Rakai Tait (born 11 December 1998) is an American–New Zealand snowboarder who competes internationally for New Zealand.

He competed in men's halfpipe at the 2018 Winter Olympics.
