= Talina Gantenbein =

Swiss freestyle skier (born 1998)

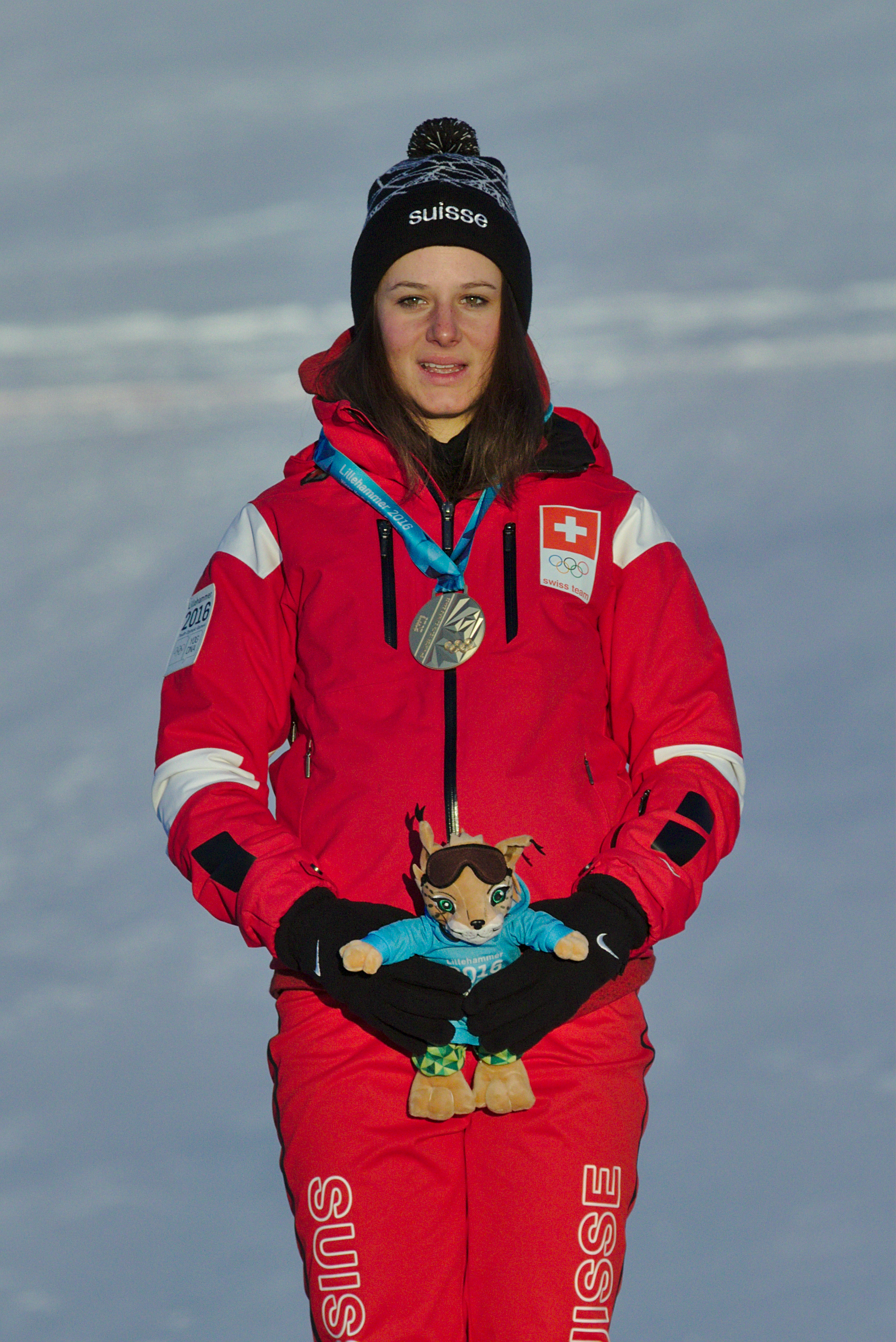
- Gantenbein in February 2016

Personal information
- Born: 18 August 1998 (age 27) Grabs, Switzerland
- Height: 165 cm (5 ft 5 in)
- Weight: 58 kg (128 lb)

Sport
- Country: Switzerland
- Sport: Freestyle skiing
- Event: Ski cross

Talina Gantenbein (born 18 August 1998) is a Swiss freestyle skier. She competed in the 2018 and 2022 Winter Olympics, in ski cross.

She won a gold medal in ski cross at the 2016 Winter Youth Olympics.
