= Finn Bilous =

New Zealand freestyle skier (born 1999)

Personal information
- Born: 22 September 1999 (age 26) Wānaka, New Zealand

Sport
- Country: New Zealand
- Sport: Freestyle skiing
- Event: Slopestyle

Finn Bilous (born 22 September 1999) is a New Zealand freestyle skier who competes internationally. He represented New Zealand in slopestyle at the 2018 Winter Olympics in PyeongChang. He finished 13th, just one spot short of making the finals (only 0.8 of a point behind). He participated at the FIS Freestyle Ski and Snowboarding World Championships 2018, winning a medal at the Big Air competition (3rd place).

Bilous is representing New Zealand at the 2022 Winter Olympics in Beijing, China.
