= 2020 World Junior Ice Hockey Championships rosters =

Below are the rosters for teams that competed in the 2020 World Junior Ice Hockey Championships.

== Group A ==
=== Finland ===
- Head coach: (Finland) Raimo Helminen

Pos.	No.	Player	Team	NHL Rights
G	1	Kari Piiroinen	(Canada) Windsor Spitfires	
G	30	Justus Annunen	(Finland) Kärpät	Colorado Avalanche
G	31	Jasper Patrikainen	(Finland) Peliitat Heinola	
D	2	Santeri Hatakka	(Finland) Ilves	San Jose Sharks
D	3	Anttoni Honka	(Finland) JYP	Carolina Hurricanes
D	4	Ville Heinola	(Finland) Lukko	Winnipeg Jets
D	5	Mikko Kokkonen	(Finland) Jukurit	Toronto Maple Leafs
D	6	Peetro Seppälä	(Finland) KooKoo	
D	9	Toni Utunen – A	(Finland) Tappara	Vancouver Canucks
D	29	Kim Nousiainen	(Finland) KalPa	Los Angeles Kings
D	33	Lassi Thomson – C	(Finland) Ilves	Ottawa Senators
F	12	Eemil Erholtz	(Finland) Sport	
F	15	Lenni Killinen	(Finland) Ässät	Carolina Hurricanes
F	18	Joonas Oden	(Finland) KooKoo	
F	19	Rasmus Kupari – A	(United States) Ontario Reign	Los Angeles Kings
F	20	Matias Maccelli	(Finland) Ilves	Arizona Coyotes
F	21	Patrik Puistola	(Finland) Tappara	Carolina Hurricanes
F	23	Ville Petman	(Finland) Lukko	
F	24	Sampo Ranta	(United States) University of Minnesota	Colorado Avalanche
F	25	Antti Saarela	(Finland) Ilves	Chicago Blackhawks
F	27	Kristian Tanus	(Finland) Jukurit	
F	34	Aatu Räty	(Finland) Kärpät	
F	35	Aku Räty	(Finland) Kärpät	Arizona Coyotes

=== Kazakhstan ===
- Head coach: (Kazakhstan) Sergei Starygin

Pos.	No.	Player	Team	NHL Rights
G	1	Vladislav Nurek	(Kazakhstan) Altay Ust-Kamenogorsk	
G	20	Maxim Pavlenko	(Kazakhstan) Snezhnye Barsy	
G	30	Roman Kalmykov	(Kazakhstan) Snezhnye Barsy	
D	3	Artyom Korolyov	(Kazakhstan) Snezhnye Barsy	
D	6	Tamirlan Gaitamirov – C	(United States) Des Moines Buccaneers	
D	7	Madi Dikhanbek	(Kazakhstan) Snezhnye Barsy	
D	8	Danil Butenko	(Kazakhstan) Snezhnye Barsy	
D	18	Timofei Katasonov	(Kazakhstan) Snezhnye Barsy	
D	23	David Muratov	(Kazakhstan) Snezhnye Barsy	
D	24	Vladimir Shlychkov	(Kazakhstan) Snezhnye Barsy	
D	28	Ansar Shaikhmeddenov	(Kazakhstan) Snezhnye Barsy	
F	5	Oleg Boiko	(Kazakhstan) Snezhnye Barsy	
F	11	Ruslan Dyomin	(Kazakhstan) HC Temirtau	
F	14	Yusup Asukhanov – A	(Kazakhstan) Snezhnye Barsy	
F	15	Denis Chaporov	(Kazakhstan) HC Temirtau	
F	16	Andrei Buyalski	(Kazakhstan) HC Temirtau	
F	17	Vladislav Saiko	(Kazakhstan) Snezhnye Barsy	
F	19	Stanislav Alexandrov	(Kazakhstan) Snezhnye Barsy	
F	21	Nikita Lyapunov	(Kazakhstan) Altay Ust-Kamenogorsk	
F	22	Maxim Chalov	(Kazakhstan) Altay Ust-Kamenogorsk	
F	25	Konstantin Bondarenko	(Kazakhstan) Altay Ust-Kamenogorsk	
F	27	Alikhan Omirbekov	(Kazakhstan) Snezhnye Barsy	
F	29	Maxim Musorov – A	(Kazakhstan) Snezhnye Barsy	

=== Slovakia ===
- Head coach: (Slovakia) Róbert Petrovický

Pos.	No.	Player	Team	NHL Rights
G	1	Samuel Vyletelka	(United States) Minnesota Magicians	
G	2	Samuel Hlavaj	(Canada) Sherbrooke Phoenix	
G	30	Jakub Lackovič	(Slovakia) MsHK Žilina	
D	3	Marcel Dlugoš	(Slovakia) HC Nové Zámky	
D	4	Dávid Mudrák	(Finland) TPS U20	
D	5	Marko Stacha	(Slovakia) HK Dukla Trenčín	
D	6	Boris Česánek	(Slovakia) HK Poprad	
D	10	Martin Bučko	(Slovakia) HC Košice	
D	17	Martin Vitaloš – C	(Sweden) Rögle J20	
D	20	Samuel Kňažko	(Finland) TPS U20	
D	22	Oliver Turan	(Slovakia) HC 07 Detva	
F	7	Martin Faško-Rudáš	(United States) Everett Silvertips	
F	8	Oliver Okuliar	(Canada) Lethbridge Hurricanes	
F	12	Kristián Kováčik – A	(Slovakia) HK Dukla Trenčín	
F	13	Adam Paulíny	(Slovakia) HK Martin	
F	14	Dominik Jendek	(Slovakia) HC Slovan Bratislava	
F	15	Jakub Minárik	(Slovakia) HK Nitra	
F	18	Viktor Ďurina	(Slovakia) HK Dukla Trenčín	
F	19	Róbert Džugan – A	(Slovakia) HK Dukla Trenčín	
F	25	Michal Mrázik	(Sweden) Linköping J20	
F	26	Marek Minárik	(Slovakia) MsHK Žilina	
F	27	Maxim Čajkovič	(Canada) Saint John Sea Dogs	Tampa Bay Lightning
F	28	Daniel Tkáč	(Canada) Merritt Centennials	

=== Sweden ===
- Head coach: (Sweden) Tomas Montén

Pos.	No.	Player	Team	NHL Rights
G	1	Jesper Eliasson	(Sweden) Almtuna IS	Detroit Red Wings
G	30	Hugo Alnefelt	(Sweden) HV71	Tampa Bay Lightning
G	35	Erik Portillo	(United States) Dubuque Fighting Saints	Buffalo Sabres
D	4	Adam Ginning – C	(Sweden) HC Vita Hästen	Philadelphia Flyers
D	5	Philip Broberg	(Sweden) Skellefteå AIK	Edmonton Oilers
D	6	Mattias Norlinder	(Sweden) Modo Hockey	Montreal Canadiens
D	7	Tobias Björnfot	(United States) Ontario Reign	Los Angeles Kings
D	8	Rasmus Sandin – A	(Canada) Toronto Marlies	Toronto Maple Leafs
D	9	Victor Söderström	(Sweden) Brynäs IF	Arizona Coyotes
D	27	Nils Lundkvist	(Sweden) Luleå HF	New York Rangers
F	10	Alexander Holtz	(Sweden) Djurgårdens IF	
F	11	Samuel Fagemo	(Sweden) Frölunda HC	Los Angeles Kings
F	15	Oskar Bäck	(Sweden) Färjestad BK	Dallas Stars
F	18	Lucas Raymond	(Sweden) Frölunda HC	
F	19	David Gustafsson – A	(Canada) Winnipeg Jets	Winnipeg Jets
F	20	Nikola Pasic	(Sweden) BIK Karlskoga	New Jersey Devils
F	21	Nils Höglander	(Sweden) Rögle BK	Vancouver Canucks
F	22	Karl Henriksson	(Sweden) Södertälje SK	New York Rangers
F	23	Albin Eriksson	(Sweden) Skellefteå AIK	Dallas Stars
F	24	Hugo Gustafsson	(Sweden) Södertälje SK	
F	25	Linus Öberg	(Sweden) Örebro HK	
F	26	Jonatan Berggren	(Sweden) Skellefteå AIK	Detroit Red Wings
F	29	Linus Nässén	(Sweden) Timrå IK	

=== Switzerland ===
- Head coach: (Switzerland) Thierry Paterlini

Pos.	No.	Player	Team	NHL Rights
G	1	Stéphane Charlin	(Switzerland) Genève-Servette HC	
G	29	Akira Schmid	(United States) Omaha Lancers	New Jersey Devils
G	30	Luca Hollenstein	(Switzerland) EV Zug	
D	2	Bastian Guggenheim	(Switzerland) SCL Tigers	
D	8	Janis Jérôme Moser – A	(Switzerland) EHC Biel	
D	9	Mika Henauer	(Switzerland) SC Bern	
D	12	Rocco Pezzullo	(Switzerland) HC Ambrì-Piotta	
D	16	Nico Gross – A	(Canada) Oshawa Generals	New York Rangers
D	21	Tim Berni – C	(Switzerland) ZSC Lions	Columbus Blue Jackets
D	26	David Aebischer	(Canada) Gatineau Olympiques	
F	5	Fabian Berri	(Switzerland) GCK Lions U20	
F	7	Stéphane Patry	(Switzerland) HC Sierre	
F	11	Jeremi Gerber	(Switzerland) SC Bern	
F	13	Matthew Verboon	(United States) Colgate University	
F	14	Sandro Schmid	(Switzerland) HC Fribourg-Gottéron	
F	15	Simon Knak	(United States) Portland Winterhawks	
F	18	Valentin Nussbaumer	(Canada) Shawinigan Cataractes	Arizona Coyotes
F	19	Gaétan Jobin	(Canada) Charlottetown Islanders	
F	20	Julian Mettler	(Switzerland) EHC Kloten	
F	22	Joel Salzgeber	(Switzerland) EHC Olten	
F	25	Kyen Sopa	(Canada) Niagara IceDogs	
F	27	Gilian Kohler	(Switzerland) EHC Biel	
F	28	Gian-Marco Wetter	(Switzerland) SC Rapperswil-Jona Lakers	

== Group B ==
=== Canada ===
- Head coach: (Canada) Dale Hunter

Pos.	No.	Player	Team	NHL Rights
G	1	Nico Daws	(Canada) Guelph Storm	
G	30	Joel Hofer	(United States) Portland Winterhawks	St. Louis Blues
G	31	Olivier Rodrigue	(Canada) Moncton Wildcats	Edmonton Oilers
D	2	Kevin Bahl	(Canada) Ottawa 67's	New Jersey Devils
D	3	Calen Addison	(Canada) Lethbridge Hurricanes	Pittsburgh Penguins
D	4	Bowen Byram	(Canada) Vancouver Giants	Colorado Avalanche
D	5	Jacob Bernard-Docker	(United States) University of North Dakota	Ottawa Senators
D	6	Jamie Drysdale	(United States) Erie Otters	
D	14	Jared McIsaac	(Canada) Halifax Mooseheads	Detroit Red Wings
D	24	Ty Smith – A	(United States) Spokane Chiefs	New Jersey Devils
F	8	Liam Foudy	(Canada) London Knights	Columbus Blue Jackets
F	9	Joe Veleno – A	(United States) Grand Rapids Griffins	Detroit Red Wings
F	10	Raphaël Lavoie	(Canada) Halifax Mooseheads	Edmonton Oilers
F	11	Alexis Lafrenière	(Canada) Rimouski Océanic	
F	16	Akil Thomas	(Canada) Niagara IceDogs	Los Angeles Kings
F	17	Connor McMichael	(Canada) London Knights	Washington Capitals
F	18	Ty Dellandrea – A	(United States) Flint Firebirds	Dallas Stars
F	19	Quinton Byfield	(Canada) Sudbury Wolves	
F	20	Dawson Mercer	(Canada) Drummondville Voltigeurs	
F	22	Dylan Cozens	(Canada) Lethbridge Hurricanes	Buffalo Sabres
F	25	Aidan Dudas	(Canada) Owen Sound Attack	Los Angeles Kings
F	27	Barrett Hayton – C	(United States) Arizona Coyotes	Arizona Coyotes
F	29	Nolan Foote	(Canada) Kelowna Rockets	Tampa Bay Lightning

=== Czech Republic ===
- Head coach: (Czech Republic) Václav Varaďa

Pos.	No.	Player	Team	NHL Rights
G	1	Lukáš Pařík	(United States) Spokane Chiefs	Los Angeles Kings
G	2	Lukáš Dostál	(Finland) Ilves	Anaheim Ducks
G	30	Nick Malík	(Czech Republic) HC Frýdek-Místek	
D	3	Karel Klikorka	(Czech Republic) HC Slovan Ústečtí Lvi	
D	4	Radek Kučeřík	(Canada) Saskatoon Blades	
D	7	Martin Haš	(Finland) Koovee	Washington Capitals
D	8	Libor Zábranský – C	(Canada) Moose Jaw Warriors	
D	9	Tomáš Dajčar	(Czech Republic) HC Stadion Litoměřice	
D	23	Šimon Kubíček	(United States) Seattle Thunderbirds	
F	10	Matěj Pekař	(Canada) Barrie Colts	Buffalo Sabres
F	11	Michal Teplý	(Canada) Winnipeg Ice	Chicago Blackhawks
F	12	Vojtěch Střondala	(Czech Republic) HC Stadion Litoměřice	
F	13	Jakub Lauko	(United States) Providence Bruins	Boston Bruins
F	14	Jan Jeník – A	(Canada) Hamilton Bulldogs	Arizona Coyotes
F	15	Ondřej Pavel	(United States) Fargo Force	
F	16	Otakar Šik	(Czech Republic) HC Stadion Litoměřice	
F	17	Matěj Blümel	(Czech Republic) HC Dynamo Pardubice	Edmonton Oilers
F	18	Karel Plášek	(Czech Republic) HC Kometa Brno	Vancouver Canucks
F	21	Jaromír Pytlík	(Canada) Sault Ste. Marie Greyhounds	
F	24	Petr Čajka – A	(Switzerland) Genève-Servette U20	
F	26	Adam Raška	(Canada) Rimouski Océanic	
F	27	Jan Myšák	(Czech Republic) HC Litvínov	
F	29	Jan Šír	(Czech Republic) HC Benátky nad Jizerou	

=== Germany ===
- Head coach: (Germany) Tobias Abstreiter

Pos.	No.	Player	Team	NHL Rights
G	1	Hendrik Hane	(Germany) Düsseldorfer EG	
G	29	Tobias Ancicka	(Finland) Lukko Rauma	
G	30	Philipp Maurer	(Germany) EV Landshut	
D	5	Daniel Wirt	(Germany) Frankfurt Lions	
D	6	Niklas Heinzinger	(Germany) Bad Toelz EC	
D	7	Leon Hüttl – A	(Germany) Frankfurt Lions	
D	21	Moritz Seider – C	(United States) Grand Rapids Griffins	Detroit Red Wings
D	25	Philipp Mass	(Austria) EC Red Bull Salzburg	
D	27	Alexander Dersch	(Germany) Düsseldorfer EG	
D	28	Eric Mik	(Germany) Lausitzer Füchse	
F	8	Tim Stützle	(Germany) Adler Mannheim	
F	10	Justin Schütz – A	(Germany) EHC Red Bull München	Florida Panthers
F	11	Jan Nijenhuis	(Germany) Grizzlys Wolfsburg	
F	12	Luis Schinko	(Germany) Frankfurt Lions	
F	13	Tim Fleischer	(Germany) Iserlohn Roosters	
F	14	Louis Brune	(Germany) Heilbronner Falken	
F	16	Nino Kinder	(Canada) Winnipeg Ice	
F	18	Taro Jentzsch	(Canada) Sherbrooke Phoenix	
F	19	Dennis Lobach	(Germany) Riessersee SC	
F	22	Yannik Valenti	(Germany) Heilbronner Falken	
F	23	Lukas Reichel	(Germany) Eisbären Berlin	
F	24	John Peterka	(Germany) EHC Red Bull München	
F	26	Dominik Bokk	(Sweden) Rögle BK	Carolina Hurricanes

=== Russia ===
- Head coach: (Russia) Valeri Bragin

Pos.	No.	Player	Team	NHL Rights
G	1	Amir Miftakhov	(Russia) JHC Bars	
G	20	Daniil Isayev	(Russia) Lokomotiv Yaroslavl	
G	30	Yaroslav Askarov	(Russia) SKA-Neva	
D	2	Danila Zhuravlyov	(Russia) Ak Bars Kazan	Colorado Avalanche
D	3	Danila Galenyuk	(Russia) SKA Saint Petersburg	
D	4	Yegor Zamula	(Canada) Calgary Hitmen	Philadelphia Flyers
D	5	Anton Malyshev	(Russia) Buran Voronezh	
D	6	Daniil Pylenkov	(Russia) Vityaz Podolsk	
D	25	Daniil Misyul	(Russia) Lokomotiv Yaroslavl	New Jersey Devils
D	26	Alexander Romanov – A	(Russia) CSKA Moscow	Montreal Canadiens
F	7	Alexander Khovanov	(Canada) Moncton Wildcats	Minnesota Wild
F	8	Ivan Morozov	(Russia) SKA-Neva	Vegas Golden Knights
F	9	Kirill Marchenko	(Russia) SKA Saint Petersburg	Columbus Blue Jackets
F	10	Dmitri Voronkov	(Russia) Ak Bars Kazan	Columbus Blue Jackets
F	11	Vasily Podkolzin – A	(Russia) SKA Saint Petersburg	Vancouver Canucks
F	12	Ilya Kruglov	(Russia) Dynamo Moscow	
F	13	Yegor Sokolov	(Canada) Cape Breton Eagles	
F	14	Grigori Denisenko – C	(Russia) Lokomotiv Yaroslavl	Florida Panthers
F	17	Maxim Sorkin	(Russia) CSKA Moscow	
F	19	Nikita Rtishchev	(Russia) CSKA Moscow	
F	24	Nikita Alexandrov	(Canada) Charlottetown Islanders	St. Louis Blues
F	27	Pavel Dorofeyev	(Russia) Metallurg Magnitogorsk	Vegas Golden Knights
F	28	Maxim Groshev	(Russia) Neftekhimik Nizhnekamsk	

=== United States ===
- Head coach: (United States) Scott Sandelin

Pos.	No.	Player	Team	NHL Rights
G	30	Spencer Knight	(United States) Boston College	Florida Panthers
G	31	Isaiah Saville	(United States) University of Nebraska Omaha	Vegas Golden Knights
G	32	Dustin Wolf	(United States) Everett Silvertips	Calgary Flames
D	2	Jordan Harris	(United States) Northeastern University	Montreal Canadiens
D	4	Cameron York	(United States) University of Michigan	Philadelphia Flyers
D	6	Zac Jones	(United States) University of Massachusetts Amherst	New York Rangers
D	7	Spencer Stastney	(United States) University of Notre Dame	Nashville Predators
D	19	K'Andre Miller – A	(United States) University of Wisconsin-Madison	New York Rangers
D	21	Ty Emberson	(United States) University of Wisconsin-Madison	Arizona Coyotes
D	24	Mattias Samuelsson – C	(United States) Western Michigan University	Buffalo Sabres
F	9	Trevor Zegras	(United States) Boston University	Anaheim Ducks
F	10	Curtis Hall	(United States) Yale University	Boston Bruins
F	12	Jack Drury	(United States) Harvard University	Carolina Hurricanes
F	13	Cole Caufield	(United States) University of Wisconsin–Madison	Montreal Canadiens
F	15	Alex Turcotte	(United States) University of Wisconsin–Madison	Los Angeles Kings
F	16	Nick Robertson	(Canada) Peterborough Petes	Toronto Maple Leafs
F	17	John Beecher	(United States) University of Michigan	Boston Bruins
F	18	Oliver Wahlstrom – A	(United States) Bridgeport Sound Tigers	New York Islanders
F	20	Parker Ford	(United States) Providence College	
F	22	Shane Pinto	(United States) University of North Dakota	Ottawa Senators
F	23	Bobby Brink	(United States) University of Denver	Philadelphia Flyers
F	25	Jacob Pivonka	(United States) University of Notre Dame	New York Islanders
F	28	Arthur Kaliyev	(Canada) Hamilton Bulldogs	Los Angeles Kings
