= 2017 Ivan Hlinka Memorial Tournament =

Tournament details
- Host countries: Czech Republic; Slovakia
- Venue(s): 2 (in 2 host cities)
- Dates: 7–12 August 2017
- Teams: 8

Final positions
- Champions: Canada (21st title)
- Runners-up: Czech Republic
- Third place: Sweden
- Fourth place: Russia

Tournament statistics
- Games played: 18
- Goals scored: 117 (6.5 per game)
- Attendance: 20,560 (1,142 per game)
- Scoring leader(s): (Russia) Dmitri Zavgorodny (5 goals, 5 assists)

Official website
- hlinkamemorial.com

The 2017 Ivan Hlinka Memorial Tournament was an under-18 international ice hockey tournament held in Břeclav, Czech Republic and Bratislava, Slovakia from 7 to 12 August 2017.

== Preliminary round ==
All times are Central European Summer Time (UTC+2).

=== Group A ===
Pos	Team	Pld	W	OTW	OTL	L	GF	GA	GD	Pts	Qualification
1	Sweden	3	3	0	0	0	17	6	+11	9	Semifinals
2	Czech Republic	3	2	0	0	1	16	12	+4	6	Semifinals
3	United States	3	1	0	0	2	6	14	−8	3	Fifth place game
4	Switzerland	3	0	0	0	3	5	12	−7	0	Seventh place game

7 August 2017; 15:30	United States	1–6 (1–0, 0–4, 0–2)	Sweden	Ice BORS Arena, Břeclav; Attendance: 523

Game reference

Isaiah Saville
Goalies
Olof Lindbom
Jakob Hellsten

Lapointe (Donovan) – 14:23	1–0
	1–1	33:26 – Wernblom (Johansson, Lilja) (PP)
	1–2	35:20 – Westfält (SH)
	1–3	38:48 – Fagemo (Boqvist, Sandin) (PP)
	1–4	39:09 – Johansson (Ginning)
	1–5	52:10 – Wernblom (Johansson) (PP)
	1–6	59:23 – Fagemo (Olofsson, Boqvist) (PP2)

36 min
Penalties
33 min
18
Shots
41

7 August 2017; 19:00	Czech Republic	6–2 (2–1, 3–0, 1–1)	Switzerland	Ice BORS Arena, Břeclav; Attendance: 1,523

Game reference

Lukáš Dostál
Goalies
Stéphane Charlin
Akira Schmid

	0–1	07:00 – Nussbaumer (Henauer, Wetter) (PP)
Jeník (Zábranský, Střondala) (PP) – 08:24	1–1
Arnošt (Klejna) – 11:04	2–1
Střondala (Kowalczyk) – 21:01	3–1
Lauko – 26:24	4–1
Jeník (Arnošt) – 35:34	5–1
Lauko (Dluhos, Zábranský) – 44:21	6–1
	6–2	47:19 – Verboon (Henauer, Nussbaumer) (PP)

8 min
Penalties
10 min
34
Shots
26

8 August 2017; 15:30	Switzerland	1–2 (1–1, 0–1, 0–0)	United States	Ice BORS Arena, Břeclav; Attendance: 223

Game reference

Akira Schmid
Goalies
Ben Kraws

	0–1	01:09 – Drury (Samuelsson)
Wetter (Nussbaumer) – 16:45	1–1
	1–2	37:27 – Hall (Lapointe, Semik) (PP)

14 min
Penalties
10 min
16
Shots
31

8 August 2017; 19:00	Czech Republic	3–7 (1–2, 1–4, 1–1)	Sweden	Ice BORS Arena, Břeclav; Attendance: 1,982

Game reference

Daniel Dvořák
Goalies
Olof Lindbom

Plášek – 14:31	1–0
	1–1	16:19 – Fagemo (Berggren, Boqvist)
	1–2	18:57 – Olofsson (Jakobsson)
Jeník (Gajarský) (PP) – 22:42	2–2
	2–3	25:28 – Westfält (Gustafsson) (PP)
	2–4	27:53 – Berggren (Gustafsson, Eriksson)
	2–5	36:48 – Hållander (Olofsson, Boqvist)
	2–6	37:26 – Fagemo (Jakobsson, Bäck)
Plášek (Gajarský, Střondala) (PP) – 41:20	3–6
	3–7	46:20 – Gustafsson (PP)

12 min
Penalties
20 min
27
Shots
35

9 August 2017; 15:30	Sweden	4–2 (2–1, 2–1, 0–0)	Switzerland	Ice BORS Arena, Břeclav; Attendance: 200

Game reference

Jakob Hellsten
Goalies
Stéphane Charlin

	0–1	03:32 – S. Schmid (Gerber, Patry)
Ginning (Berggren) – 04:27	1–1
Berggren (Gustafsson) – 08:23	2–1
Fagemo (Boqvist, Sandin) – 21:39	3–1
Hållander (Wernblom, Boqvist) – 33:29	4–1
	4–2	34:18 – Vouillamoz (Nussbaumer)

6 min
Penalties
2 min
34
Shots
26

9 August 2017; 19:00	Czech Republic	7–3 (2–0, 2–1, 3–2)	United States	Ice BORS Arena, Břeclav; Attendance: 2,145

Game reference

Lukáš Dostál
Goalies
Isaiah Saville

Gajarský (Střondala) (PP) – 00:34	1–0
Jeník (Plášek, Adámek) – 19:48	2–0
Zábranský (Dluhoš) (PP) – 24:40	3–0
	3–1	34:47 – Savage (Samuelsson)
Střondala (Jeník) – 36:51	4–1
	4–2	41:00 – Drury (Randl, Krygier)
Kvasnica (Blümel, Klejna) (PP) – 48:59	5–2
Lauko (Pekař) – 50:18	6–2
Jeník (SH) – 59:18	7–2
	7–3	59:43 – McLaughlin (Hain) (PP)

10 min
Penalties
22 min
35
Shots
28

=== Group B ===
Pos	Team	Pld	W	OTW	OTL	L	GF	GA	GD	Pts	Qualification
1	Russia	3	2	1	0	0	16	7	+9	8	Semifinals
2	Canada	3	2	0	1	0	14	6	+8	7	Semifinals
3	Finland	3	1	0	0	2	8	9	−1	3	Fifth place game
4	Slovakia	3	0	0	0	3	5	21	−16	0	Seventh place game

7 August 2017; 15:30	Canada	3–4 GWS (1–1, 1–1, 1–1); OT: (0–0); SO: (0–1)	Russia	Ondrej Nepela Arena, Bratislava; Attendance: 1,012

Game reference

Alexis Gravel
Goalies
Amir Miftakhov
Referees:
(Slovakia) Peter Jonák
(Slovakia) Vladimír Goga
Linesmen:
(Slovakia) Lukáš Kacej
(Slovakia) Roman Výleta

Hayton (Addison, Merkley) (PP) – 05:48	1–0
	1–1	10:38 – Rtishchev (Solopanov)
	1–2	24:10 – Zavgorodny
McBain (Addison) – 35:23	2–2
	2–3	41:18 – Zavgorodny (Okhotyuk, Rotenberg)
Thomas (Addison, Veleno) (PP) – 44:41	3–3

McIsaac (miss)
Foote (miss)
Veleno
Veleno (miss)
Shootout
(miss) Zavgorodny
(miss) Sokolov
Iskhakov
Iskhakov
10 min
Penalties
20 min
31
Shots
28

7 August 2017; 19:00	Slovakia	1–6 (1–2, 0–1, 0–3)	Finland	Ondrej Nepela Arena, Bratislava; Attendance: 1,370

Game reference

Michal Vojvoda
Goalies
Justus Annunen
Referees:
(Slovakia) Vladimír Baluška
(Slovakia) Vladimír Fridrich
Linesmen:
(Slovakia) Jozef Tvrdoň
(Slovakia) Michal Orolín

	0–1	11:08 – Utunen (Maccelli, Moilanen)
	0–2	16:12 – Kupari (Tanus, Salmela)
Zekucia (Pjaták, Turan) (PP) – 19:18	1–2
	1–3	36:26 – Aaltonen (Kupari, Honka)
	1–4	52:21 – Kotkaniemi (Kupari, Utunen) (PP)
	1–5	54:46 – Kupari (Nousiainen, Aaltonen)
	1–6	57:00 – Aaltonen (Kupari, Tanus) (PP)

10 min
Penalties
8 min
21
Shots
37

8 August 2017; 15:30	Finland	1–5 (0–1, 0–2, 1–2)	Canada	Ondrej Nepela Arena, Bratislava; Attendance: 315

Game reference

Justus Annunen
Goalies
Olivier Rodrigue
Referees:
(Slovakia) Daniel Konc
(Slovakia) Peter Stano
Linesmen:
(Slovakia) Šimon Synek
(Slovakia) Peter Šefčík

	0–1	05:09 – Groulx (McIsaac)
	0–2	27:45 – Addison (Merkley, Veleno) (PP2)
	0–3	34:41 – Foote (Hayton, Thomas) (PP)
	0–4	47:03 – McBain (Veleno, Merkley) (PP)
	0–5	55:15 – Fortier (Hayton)
Maccelli (Kupari, Killinen) – 58:19	1–5

14 min
Penalties
10 min
14
Shots
29

8 August 2017; 19:00	Slovakia	3–9 (1–2, 1–4, 1–3)	Russia	Ondrej Nepela Arena, Bratislava; Attendance: 1,626

Game reference

Samuel Vyletelka
Michal Vojvoda
Goalies
Denis Rybalkin
Referees:
(Slovakia) Vladimír Baluška
(Slovakia) Vladimír Goga
Linesmen:
(Slovakia) Roman Výleta
(Slovakia) Jozef Tvrdoň

	0–1	07:31 – Shabanov (Iskhakov)
Kováčik (Melcher, Džugan) – 00:34	1–1
	1–2	19:59 – Iskhakov (Rtishchev, Zavgorodny) (PP)
	1–3	22:38 – Zhabreyev (Bilyalov, Sokolov)
	1–4	26:15 – Bilyalov (Zhabreyev, Sokolov)
	1–5	30:45 – Zhabreyev (Bilyalov, Zhilyakov) (PP)
	1–6	30:59 – Rotenberg (Zavgorodny)
Bučko (Kováčik) (PP) – 34:12	2–6
	2–7	43:33 – Guskov (Zavgorodny, Rotenberg) (PP)
	2–8	47:49 – Rotenberg (Okhotyuk, Zhuravlyov)
	2–9	51:52 – Zavgorodny (Malyshev, Zhilyakov)
Sarvaš (Minko) – 53:35	3–9

24 min
Penalties
41 min
26
Shots
49

9 August 2017; 15:30	Russia	3–1 (2–0, 0–1, 1–0)	Finland	Ondrej Nepela Arena, Bratislava; Attendance: 303

Game reference

Amir Miftakhov
Goalies
Justus Annunen
Referees:
(Slovakia) Daniel Konc
(Slovakia) Peter Jonák
Linesmen:
(Slovakia) Michal Orolín
(Slovakia) Lukáš Kacej

Rotenberg (Zavgorodny, Zhuravlyov) (PP) – 09:19	1–0
Zavgorodny – 15:35	2–0
	2–1	24:30 – Kokkonen (Ranta, Kotkaniemi)
Guskov (Rotenberg, Zavgorodny) – 43:40	3–1

6 min
Penalties
4 min
20
Shots
31

9 August 2017; 19:00	Slovakia	1–6 (0–2, 0–2, 1–2)	Canada	Ondrej Nepela Arena, Bratislava; Attendance: 1,974

Game reference

Michal Vojvoda
Goalies
Olivier Rodrigue
Referees:
(Slovakia) Vladimír Fridrich
(Slovakia) Peter Stano
Linesmen:
(Slovakia) Peter Šefčík
(Slovakia) Jozef Tvrdoň

	0–1	18:00 – Addison (Hayton, Foote) (PP)
	0–2	18:34 – Fortier
	0–3	31:07 – Hayton (Bahl, Dobson)
	0–4	35:39 – MacDonald (Veleno) (PP)
Turan (Okuliar, Ilenčík) (PP2) – 45:27	1–4
	1–5	47:20 – Veleno (Merkley, MacDonald) (PP)
	1–6	49:49 – Hayton (Smith, Thomas) (PP)

26 min
Penalties
14 min
12
Shots
39

== Final round ==
=== Seventh place game ===
11 August 2017; 15:30	Switzerland	2–1 (0–1, 1–0, 1–0)	Slovakia	Ondrej Nepela Arena, Bratislava; Attendance: 312

Game reference

Akira Schmid
Goalies
Samuel Vyletelka
Referees:
(Slovakia) Vladimír Baluška
(Slovakia) Vladimír Goga
Linesmen:
(Slovakia) Jozef Tvrdoň
(Slovakia) Šimon Synek

	0–1	02:45 – Okuliar (Bučko, Sarvaš)
S. Schmid (SH) – 29:46	1–1
Pena-Triana (Moser) – 47:09	2–1

6 min
Penalties
4 min
19
Shots
24

=== Fifth place game ===
11 August 2017; 15:30	Finland	3–4 OT (1–1, 1–1, 1–1); OT: (0–1)	United States	Ice BORS Arena, Břeclav; Attendance: 254

Game reference

Kalle Nurmi
Goalies
Ben Kraws

Aaltonen (Utunen, Kotkaniemi) (PP2) – 07:46	1–0
	1–1	14:24 – Hall (Drury) (PP)
Kotkaniemi (Kupari, Tanus) (PP) – 21:31	2–1
	2–2	26:19 – Hall (Drury) (PP)
	2–3	40:15 – McLaughlin (Hall, Drury)
Ranta (Aaltonen, Tanus) (EA) – 59:41	3–3
	3–4	62:14 – Donovan (McLaughlin, Hain)

12 min
Penalties
10 min
33
Shots
43

=== Semifinals ===
11 August 2017; 19:00	Sweden	1–4 (0–0, 1–1, 0–3)	Canada	Ondrej Nepela Arena, Bratislava; Attendance: 550

Game reference

Olof Lindbom
Goalies
Olivier Rodrigue
Referees:
(Slovakia) Peter Jonák
(Slovakia) Vladimír Fridrich
Linesmen:
(Slovakia) Roman Výleta
(Slovakia) Peter Šefčík

	0–1	35:34 – Thomas (Addison, Merkley) (PP)
Wernblom (Ginning, Johansson) (PP) – 39:58	1–1
	1–2	48:36 – Noel (McBain, McIsaac)
	1–3	57:27 – Groulx (Veleno, Smith)
	1–4	59:25 – Dudas (Groulx) (ENG)

12 min
Penalties
18 min
25
Shots
26

11 August 2017; 19:00	Russia	1–2 (1–1, 0–1, 0–0)	Czech Republic	Ice BORS Arena, Břeclav; Attendance: 2,895

Game reference

Amir Miftakhov
Goalies
Lukáš Dostál

Dyadenkin (Tsybin) – 06:25	1–0
	1–1	12:45 – Jeník (Zábranský)
	1–2	22:30 – Lauko

30 min
Penalties
12 min
23
Shots
30

=== Bronze medal game ===
12 August 2017; 17:00	Sweden	4–3 OT (0–1, 0–1, 3–1); OT: (1–0)	Russia	Ondrej Nepela Arena, Bratislava; Attendance: 350

Game reference

Olof Lindbom
Goalies
Denis Rybalkin
Referees:
(Slovakia) Vladimír Baluška
(Slovakia) Daniel Konc
Linesmen:
(Slovakia) Roman Výleta
(Slovakia) Peter Šefčík

	0–1	00:19 – Zavgorodny
	0–2	27:20 – Sokolov (Bilyalov, Zhuravlyov)
Berggren (Ginning) – 49:17	1–2
Boqvist (Sandin) – 52:19	2–2
Hållander (Wernblom, Boqvist) – 57:00	3–2
	3–3	59:37 – Okhotyuk (Sokolov, Iskhakov) (EA)
Olofsson – 64:15	4–3

2 min
Penalties
8 min
29
Shots
20

=== Final ===
12 August 2017; 17:00	Canada	4–1 (1–0, 2–1, 1–0)	Czech Republic	Ice BORS Arena, Břeclav; Attendance: 3,003

Game reference

Olivier Rodrigue
Goalies
Lukáš Dostál

McIsaac (Merkley) – 16:26	1–0
Veleno (McBain, Dobson) – 26:59	2–0
	2–1	26:59 – Arnošt (Sedlák)
Bahl (Dobson, Thomas) – 39:29	3–1
McBain (Smith, Thomas) – 47:53	4–1

18 min
Penalties
4 min
46
Shots
19

== Final standings ==
Rank	Team
1st place, gold medalist(s)	Canada
2nd place, silver medalist(s)	Czech Republic
3rd place, bronze medalist(s)	Sweden
4	Russia
5	United States
6	Finland
7	Switzerland
8	Slovakia
