= Jack McBain =

Canadian ice hockey player (born 2000)

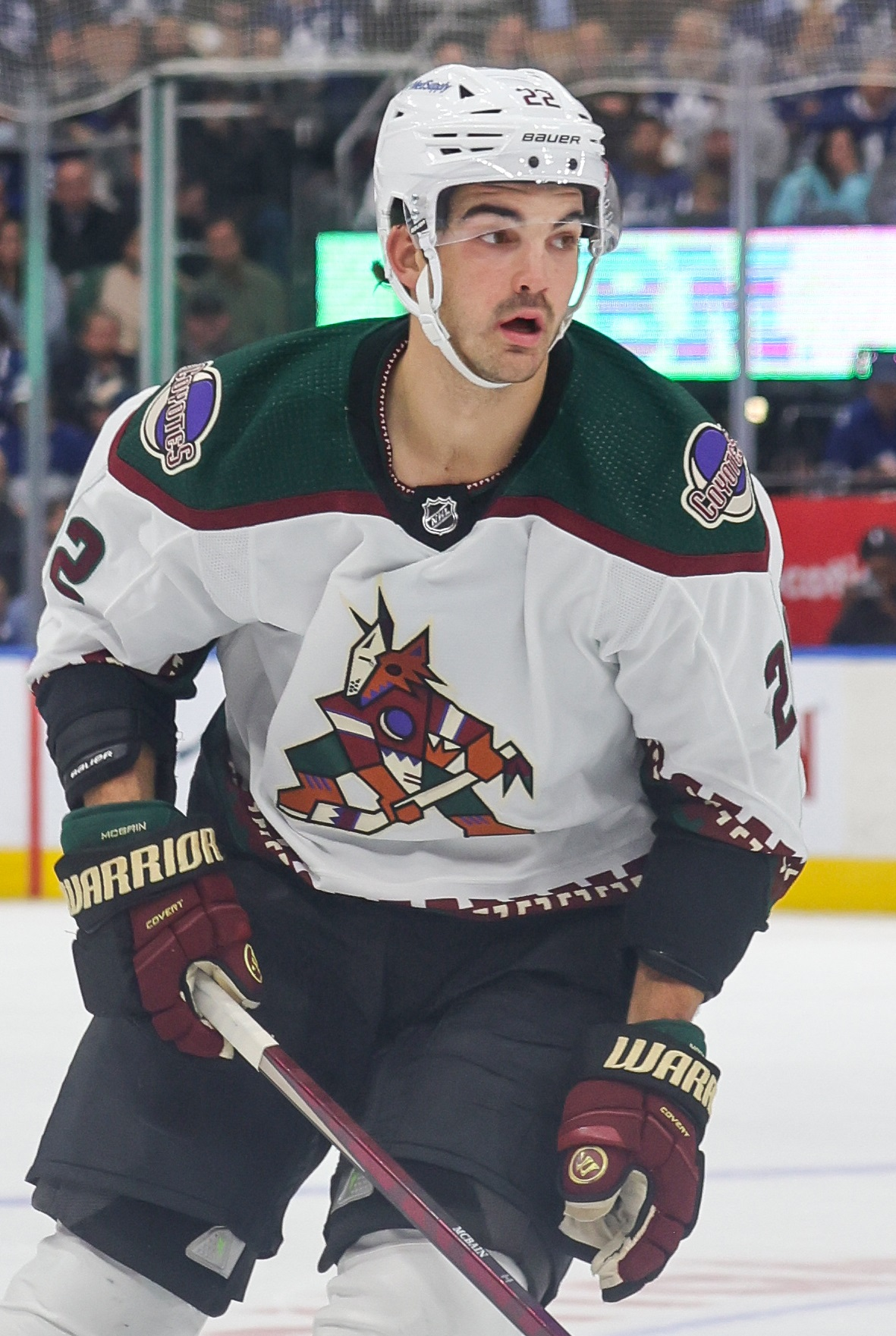
- McBain with the Arizona Coyotes in 2022
- Born: January 6, 2000 (age 26) Toronto, Ontario, Canada
- Height: 6 ft 4 in (193 cm)
- Weight: 219 lb (99 kg; 15 st 9 lb)
- Position: Centre
- Shoots: Left
- NHL team Former teams: Utah Mammoth; Arizona Coyotes
- National team: Canada
- NHL draft: 63rd overall, 2018; Minnesota Wild
- Playing career: 2022–present

Jack McBain (born January 6, 2000) is a Canadian professional ice hockey player who is a centre for the Utah Mammoth of the National Hockey League (NHL). He was drafted 63rd overall by the Minnesota Wild in the 2018 NHL entry draft.

== Playing career ==
McBain played his minor hockey for the Don Mills Flyers of the Greater Toronto Hockey League (GTHL). Despite being drafted in the 1st round of the Ontario Hockey League's Priority Selection by the Barrie Colts, McBain opted to play junior hockey for the Toronto Jr. Canadiens of the Ontario Junior Hockey League (OJHL) to maintain his eligibility in the NCAA.

After winning the OJHL's Top Prospect Award, McBain was drafted 63rd overall by the Minnesota Wild in the 2018 NHL entry draft. After the draft, he committed to Boston College and played with them for four seasons.

Following the completion of McBain's senior season with the Eagles and the conclusion of his collegiate career, McBain informed the Wild that he did not intend to sign a contract with the club as he was afraid he was not good enough to crack the roster. Faced with the prospect of losing McBain's rights for nothing, the Wild began exploring trade opportunities for his signing rights. On March 20, 2022, McBain's NHL rights were traded by Minnesota to the Arizona Coyotes in exchange for a 2022 second-round draft pick. McBain was signed to an entry-level contract by the Coyotes a day after he was traded. McBain made his NHL debut on April 12, 2022 against the New Jersey Devils. He recorded his first point three games later, an assist on a goal by teammate Nick Ritchie, in a 9–1 loss to the Calgary Flames on April 16. On December 29, 2022, McBain recorded his first multi goal and point game, scoring two goals in a 6-3 victory against the Toronto Maple Leafs.

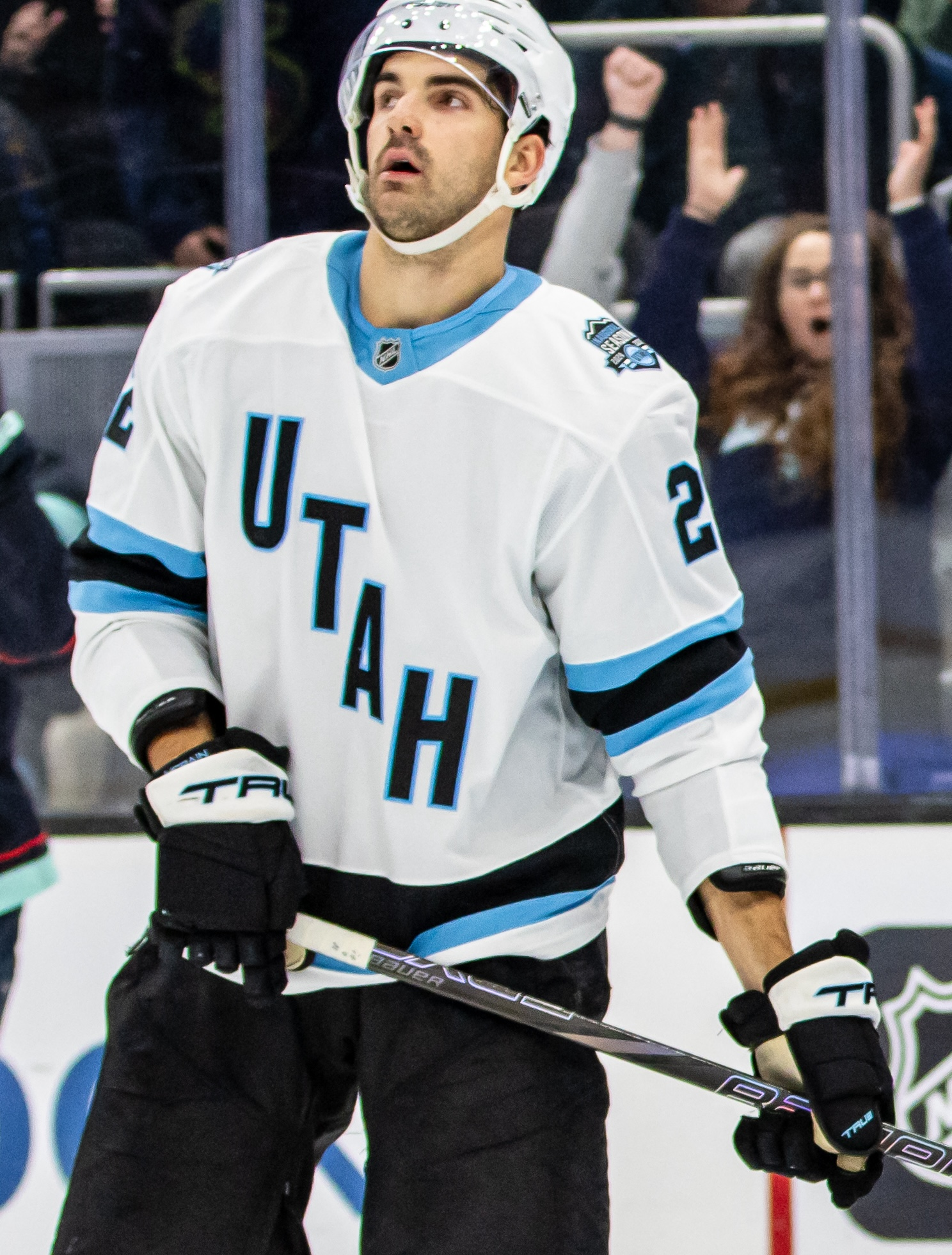
McBain with the Utah Hockey Club in 2024

At the conclusion of McBain's first professional contract following the 2022–23 season, McBain (a restricted free agent) and the Coyotes reached an impasse on a contract extension. Unable to agree on a contract extension, McBain and the team filed to have an independent arbitrator settle on a new contract; McBain filed seeking a 1 year, $2.25 million contract, while the team filed with an offer of a 2 year deal worth an average annual value of $1.2 million a season. On July 30, 2023, hours before the case was set to be heard by an arbitrator, McBain and the Coyotes agreed to a 2-year, $3.2 million contract worth an average of $1.6 million a season.

Shortly after the end of the 2023–24 regular season, the Coyotes' franchise was suspended and team assets were subsequently transferred to the expansion team Utah Hockey Club; as a result, McBain became a member of the Utah team.

On November 18, 2024, McBain had a leg-on-leg collision with Alexander Ovechkin, breaking Overchkin's left fibula and sidelining him for five weeks, the longest injury of the famously-durable left-winger's 20-year career.

On July 7, 2025, McBain signed a 5-year contract to remain with Utah.

== International play ==
Medal record

Representing Canada

Ice hockey

World Championships
Gold medal – first place	2023 Finland/Latvia	

With the NHL opting to sit out the 2022 Winter Olympics, McBain was selected to play for Team Canada at the ice hockey tournament. The event proved a disappointment for the Canadian team, who were ousted in the quarter-final by Sweden.

At the conclusion of the 2022–23 NHL season and the Coyotes not qualifying for the 2023 Stanley Cup playoffs, McBain accepted an invitation to be part of Team Canada for the 2023 IIHF World Championship. The team made a deep run to the event final, where they defeated Germany for the gold. The following year, McBain again rejoined the national team for the 2024 IIHF World Championship.

== Personal life ==
McBain is the son of former NHL player Andrew McBain. He grew up in The Beaches neighbourhood of Toronto.

== Career statistics ==
=== Regular season and playoffs ===
			Regular season					Playoffs
Season	Team	League	GP	G	A	Pts	PIM	GP	G	A	Pts	PIM
2016–17	Toronto Jr. Canadiens	OJHL	42	12	29	41	36	11	4	8	12	22
2017–18	Toronto Jr. Canadiens	OJHL	48	21	37	58	74	4	6	3	9	15
2018–19	Boston College	HE	35	6	7	13	39	—	—	—	—	—
2019–20	Boston College	HE	34	6	15	21	39	—	—	—	—	—
2020–21	Boston College	HE	24	6	13	19	12	—	—	—	—	—
2021–22	Boston College	HE	24	19	14	33	14	—	—	—	—	—
2021–22	Arizona Coyotes	NHL	10	2	1	3	6	—	—	—	—	—
2022–23	Arizona Coyotes	NHL	82	12	14	26	64	—	—	—	—	—
2023–24	Arizona Coyotes	NHL	67	8	18	26	50	—	—	—	—	—
2024–25	Utah Hockey Club	NHL	82	13	14	27	78	—	—	—	—	—
2025–26	Utah Mammoth	NHL	75	9	16	25	84	—	—	—	—	—
NHL totals			316	44	63	107	282	—	—	—	—	—

=== International ===
Year	Team	Event	Result	GP	G	A	Pts	PIM
2016	Canada Black	U17	2nd place, silver medalist(s)	1	0	0	0	0
2017	Canada	IH18	1st place, gold medalist(s)	5	3	2	5	8
2018	Canada	WJC18	5th	5	1	2	3	2
2022	Canada	OG	6th	5	1	1	2	2
2023	Canada	WC	1st place, gold medalist(s)	10	2	2	4	6
2024	Canada	WC	4th	10	0	2	2	6
Junior totals				11	4	4	8	10
Senior totals				25	3	5	8	14

== Awards and honors ==
Award	Year	Ref
College
All Hockey East Second Team	2021–22	
AHCA East Second Team All-American	2021–22	
