= Nikita Okhotiuk =

Russian ice hockey player (born 2000)

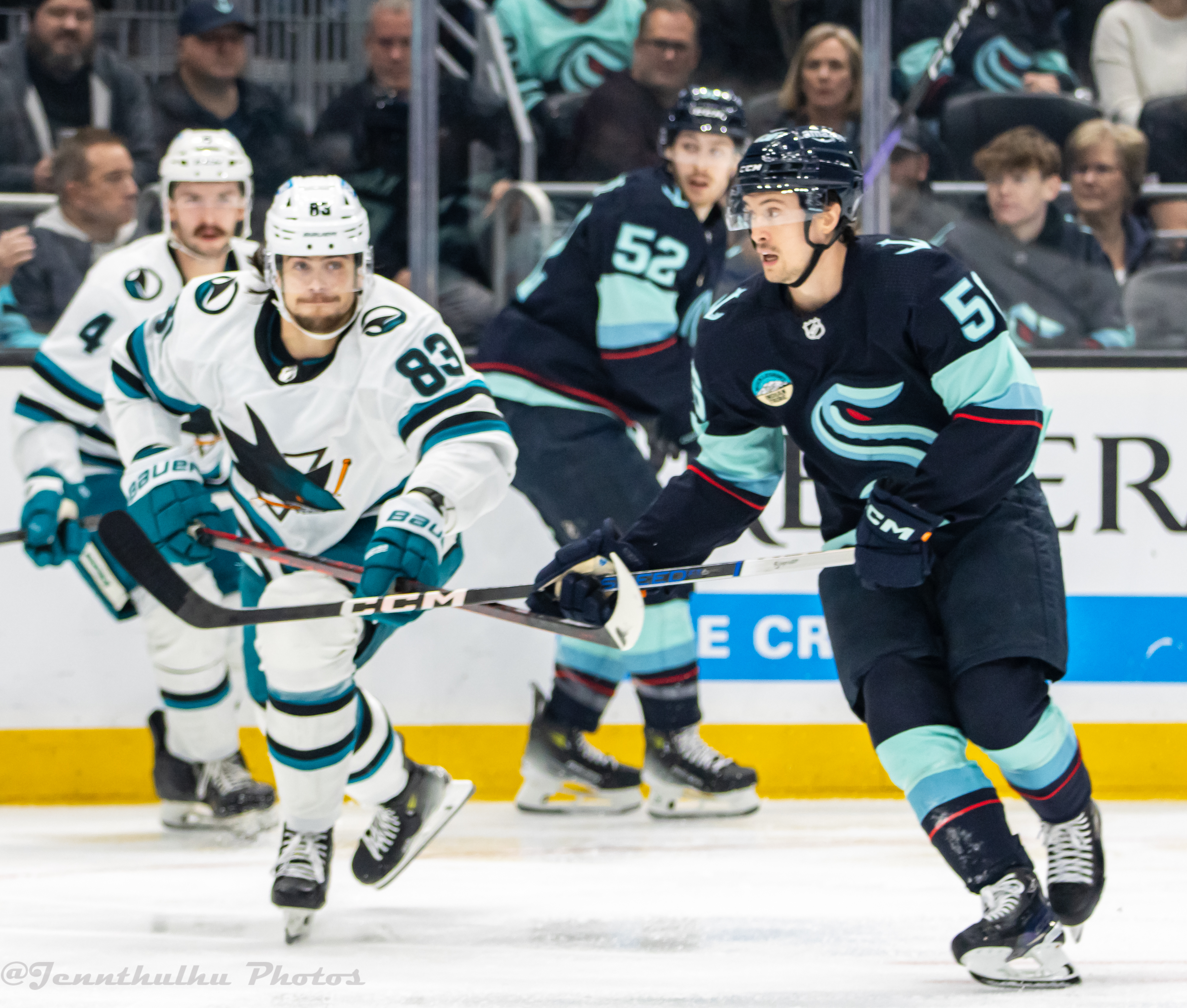
- Okhotiuk (left) with the San Jose Sharks in 2023
- Born: 4 December 2000 (age 25) Chelyabinsk, Russia
- Height: 6 ft 1 in (185 cm)
- Weight: 195 lb (88 kg; 13 st 13 lb)
- Position: Defence
- Shoots: Left
- KHL team Former teams: CSKA Moscow; New Jersey Devils; San Jose Sharks; Calgary Flames
- NHL draft: 61st overall, 2019; New Jersey Devils
- Playing career: 2020–present

Nikita Alexeyevich Okhotiuk (Russian: Никита Алексеевич Охотюк; born 4 December 2000) is a Russian professional ice hockey defenceman for CSKA Moscow of the Kontinental Hockey League (KHL).

== Playing career ==
Okhotiuk played in his native Russia as a youth with Belye Medvedi of the Junior Hockey League (MHL) before continuing his development in North America with the Ottawa 67's of the Ontario Hockey League (OHL).

He was drafted by the New Jersey Devils with the 61st overall pick in the second round of the 2019 NHL entry draft. In the following 2019–20 season, Okhotiuk was signed by the Devils to a three-year, entry-level contract on 30 December 2019.

During his second professional season within the Devils organization in 2021–22, Okhotiuk was recalled from AHL affiliate, the Utica Comets, and made his NHL debut for the Devils on 21 April 2022, and notched his first career NHL goal in a 5–2 loss to the Buffalo Sabres.

In the following 2022–23 season, Okhotiuk was traded by the Devils to the San Jose Sharks on 26 February 2023, as part of a multi-player deal, in which the Devils received Timo Meier.

During the 2023–24 NHL season, on 8 March 2024, Okhotiuk was traded by the Sharks at the trade deadline to the Calgary Flames in exchange for a 2024 fifth-round pick.

On 26 May 2024, Okhotiuk signed a two-year deal with CSKA Moscow of the Kontinental Hockey League (KHL), despite sanctions on the club by the International Ice Hockey Federation (IIHF) banning international transfers. His contract was later confirmed by the club on 1 August 2024.

== Career statistics ==
=== Regular season and playoffs ===
			Regular season					Playoffs
Season	Team	League	GP	G	A	Pts	PIM	GP	G	A	Pts	PIM
2016–17	Belye Medvedi	MHL	19	1	3	4	37	—	—	—	—	—
2017–18	Ottawa 67's	OHL	53	5	6	11	71	5	0	1	1	4
2018–19	Ottawa 67's	OHL	56	2	15	17	43	18	1	1	2	15
2019–20	Ottawa 67's	OHL	39	3	16	19	35	—	—	—	—	—
2020–21	Binghamton Devils	AHL	28	2	4	6	36	—	—	—	—	—
2021–22	Utica Comets	AHL	63	3	9	12	68	5	0	3	3	11
2021–22	New Jersey Devils	NHL	5	1	1	2	2	—	—	—	—	—
2022–23	Utica Comets	AHL	20	2	4	6	33	—	—	—	—	—
2022–23	New Jersey Devils	NHL	10	1	0	1	2	—	—	—	—	—
2023–24	San Jose Barracuda	AHL	5	0	1	1	4	—	—	—	—	—
2023–24	San Jose Sharks	NHL	43	1	7	8	44	—	—	—	—	—
2023–24	Calgary Flames	NHL	9	0	1	1	4	—	—	—	—	—
2024–25	CSKA Moscow	KHL	62	2	7	9	30	6	0	1	1	2
2025–26	CSKA Moscow	KHL	67	2	12	14	27	10	0	2	2	4
NHL totals			67	3	9	12	52	—	—	—	—	—
KHL totals			129	4	19	23	57	16	0	3	3	6

=== International ===
Year	Team	Event	Result	GP	G	A	Pts	PIM
2016	Russia	U17	3rd place, bronze medalist(s)	6	0	0	0	4
2017	Russia	IH18	4th	5	1	2	3	4
2018	Russia	U18	6th	5	0	2	2	6
Junior totals				16	1	4	5	14
