= Ruslan Iskhakov =

Russian ice hockey player (born 2000)

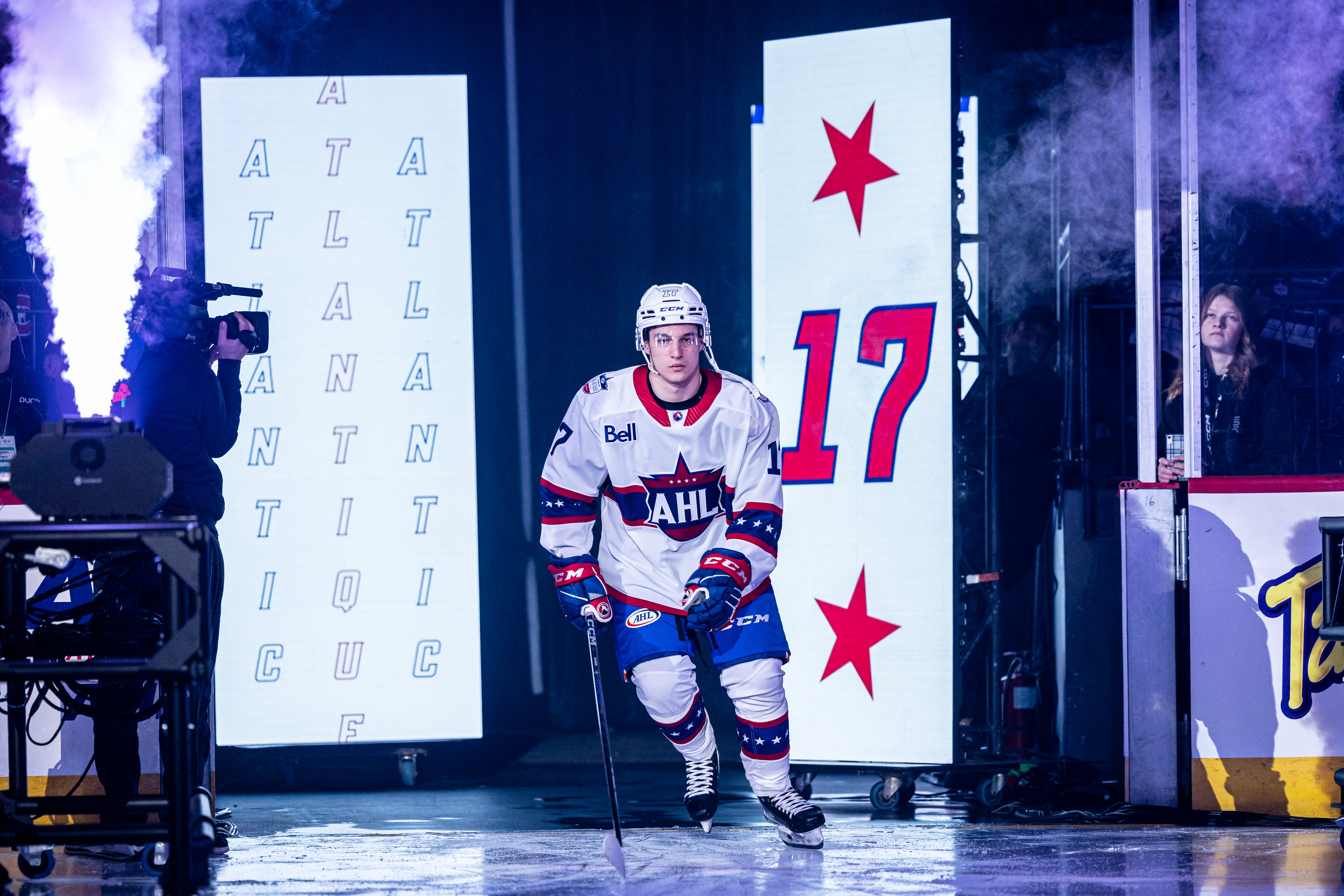
- Born: 22 July 2000 (age 26) Moscow, Russia
- Height: 5 ft 8 in (173 cm)
- Weight: 170 lb (77 kg; 12 st 2 lb)
- Position: Forward
- Shoots: Left
- KHL team Former teams: Metallurg Magnitogorsk; HC TPS; Adler Mannheim; New York Islanders; CSKA Moscow
- NHL draft: 43rd overall, 2018; New York Islanders
- Playing career: 2020–present

Ruslan Iskhakov (born 22 July 2000) is a Russian professional ice hockey forward for Metallurg Magnitogorsk of the Kontinental Hockey League (KHL). He was selected in the second round, 43rd overall, by the New York Islanders in the 2018 NHL entry draft.

== Playing career ==
As a youth, Iskhakov played within HC CSKA Moscow junior ranks, featuring Krasnaya Armiya of the MHL in the 2017–18 season. Following his selection by the New York Islanders in the 2018 NHL entry draft, Iskhakov immediately moved to North America and played collegiate hockey with the University of Connecticut of the Hockey East for two seasons.

Following his sophomore season, and with the disruption of COVID-19 pandemic halting the collegiate ranks, Iskhakov opted to turn professional in joining Finnish club, HC TPS of the Liiga for the 2020–21 season on 29 May 2020. In his lone season with TPS, Iskhakov added an immediate offensive impact in posting 10 goals and 38 points through 54 regular season appearances. He helped the club reach the championship finals in notching seven points through 13 playoff contests.

Iskhakov opted to continue his development in Europe for the 2021–22 season, signing a one-year deal with German club, Adler Mannheim of the Deutsche Eishockey Liga (DEL) on 21 May 2021. With his season limited through injury, Iskhakov still increased his offensive pace in contributing with 22 points through 25 regular season appearances.

On 26 May 2022, Iskhakov returned to North American after he agreed to terms with draft club, the New York Islanders, on a two-year, entry-level contract.

During the 2023–24 season, Iskhakov was recalled by the Islanders and made his National Hockey League (NHL) debut, registering an assist in his lone regular appearance with the club in a 5–4 victory over the Pittsburgh Penguins on 17 April 2024. Remaining on the roster into the playoffs, Iskhakov drew into the lineup and made his postseason debut during a first round series against the Carolina Hurricanes. He was scoreless in a 3–2 victory over the Hurricanes on 27 April 2024, however did not feature in the remainder of the series.

As a pending restricted free agent, Iskhakov opted to halt his career in North America and return to his homeland after signing a two-year contract with perennial contending club, HC CSKA Moscow of the Kontinental Hockey League (KHL), on 1 August 2024.

Following completion of his first season with CSKA, Iskhakov was traded to Metallurg Magnitogorsk in exchange for Denis Zernov on 3 July 2025.

== Career statistics ==
=== Regular season and playoffs ===
			Regular season					Playoffs
Season	Team	League	GP	G	A	Pts	PIM	GP	G	A	Pts	PIM
2015–16	HK Trnava	Slovak U18	6	2	1	3	2	11	6	2	8	4
2016–17	HK Trnava	Slovak U18	44	42	62	104	28	11	9	9	18	18
2017–18	Krasnaya Armiya	MHL	33	6	24	30	2	4	1	0	1	4
2018–19	U. of Connecticut	HE	32	6	15	21	20	—	—	—	—	—
2019–20	U. of Connecticut	HE	32	9	12	21	26	—	—	—	—	—
2020–21	HC TPS	Liiga	54	10	28	38	24	13	2	5	7	8
2021–22	Adler Mannheim	DEL	25	7	15	22	10	4	0	1	1	0
2022–23	Bridgeport Islanders	AHL	69	17	34	51	50	—	—	—	—	—
2023–24	Bridgeport Islanders	AHL	69	18	32	50	30	—	—	—	—	—
2023–24	New York Islanders	NHL	1	0	1	1	0	1	0	0	0	0
2024–25	CSKA Moscow	KHL	60	12	17	29	30	5	1	1	2	0
2025–26	Metallurg Magnitogorsk	KHL	65	17	21	38	30	15	1	7	8	8
Liiga totals			54	10	28	38	24	13	2	5	7	8
NHL totals			1	0	1	1	0	1	0	0	0	0
KHL totals			125	29	38	67	60	20	2	8	10	8

=== International ===
Year	Team	Event	Result	GP	G	A	Pts	PIM
2017	Russia	IH18	4th	5	2	2	4	4
2018	Russia	U18	6th	5	3	0	3	2
Junior totals				10	5	2	7	6

== Awards and honours ==
Award	Year	Ref
AHL
All-Star Game	2023, 2024	
