= Jan Jeník =

Czech ice hockey player (born 2000)

- Born: 15 September 2000 (age 25) Nymburk, Czech Republic
- Height: 6 ft 1 in (185 cm)
- Weight: 204 lb (93 kg; 14 st 8 lb)
- Position: Forward
- Shoots: Left
- NHL team (P) Cur. team Former teams: Los Angeles Kings; Ontario Reign (AHL); Bílí Tygři Liberec; Arizona Coyotes; Ottawa Senators
- NHL draft: 65th overall, 2018; Arizona Coyotes
- Playing career: 2017–present

Jan Jeník (born 15 September 2000) is a Czech professional ice hockey player who is a forward for the Ontario Reign of the American Hockey League (AHL) while under contract to the Los Angeles Kings of the National Hockey League (NHL). He was selected 65th overall in the 2018 NHL entry draft by the Arizona Coyotes.

== Playing career ==
Jeník split his first season in the Czech Republic with HC Benátky nad Jizerou of the 1st Czech Republic Hockey League and HC Bílí Tygři Liberec of the Czech Extraliga. He did the same in his final year in Czechia. Jeník was selected by the Flint Firebirds of the Ontario Hockey League (OHL) in the first round, sixth overall of the 2018 CHL import draft. His rights were traded to the Hamilton Bulldogs of the OHL on 7 January 2019 for a pair of draft picks. In his first season with Hamilton he scored 13 goals and 30 points in 27 games.

Jeník was drafted by the Arizona Coyotes of the National Hockey League (NHL) in the third round, 65th overall in the 2018 NHL entry draft. On 29 March 2019, Jeník was signed to a three-year, entry-level contract with the Coyotes. Following his second season in the OHL with the Bulldogs, and with the 2020–21 North American season delayed due to the COVID-19 pandemic, Jeník was loaned by the Coyotes to Finnish second-tier club, Imatran Ketterä of the Mestis, until the commencement of NHL training camp on 28 October 2020.

He returned to North America and was assigned to Arizona's American Hockey League (AHL) affiliate, the Tucson Roadrunners for the 2020–21 season. He was recalled by Arizona for the final two games of the season in May 2021 and made his NHL debut versus the San Jose Sharks on 7 May 2021. He scored his first NHL goal in the game against Josef Kořenář. Jeník also scored in his second game, also against the Sharks, becoming the second Coyotes player to score in his first two games. He began the 2021–22 season with Tucson. Jeník spent 13 games with the Coyotes that season. He once again returned to Tucson for the 2022–23 season, spending the majority of the season in the AHL, appearing in only two games with the Coyotes. A restricted free agent following the season, he signed a one-year, two-way contract with Arizona on 20 September 2023.

Jeník attended the Coyotes 2023 training camp was but was placed on waivers. After going unclaimed, he was assigned to Tucson. He was recalled in October 2023 but did not appear in any games before being sent back to the Roadrunners. He was recalled again in November after Barrett Hayton was injured. He made his season debut for the Coyotes in 6–5 loss to the St. Louis Blues before being returned to Tucson on 26 November.

Shortly after the end of the 2023–24 regular season, the Coyotes' franchise was suspended and team assets were subsequently transferred to the expansion Utah Hockey Club; as a result, Jeník became a member of the Utah team. On 3 July 2024, he was traded by Utah to the Ottawa Senators for winger Egor Sokolov. He cleared waivers and was assigned to Ottawa's AHL affiliate, the Belleville Senators, to start the 2024–25 season. He missed the first nine games of the season recovering from an injury suffered in training camp. He was recalled by Ottawa on 7 January 2025 and made his Senators debut that night in a 3–2 overtime loss to the Detroit Red Wings. He was returned to Belleville the following day. He was recalled again on 26 February after injuries to forwards Brady Tkachuk, Josh Norris, and Shane Pinto. He made a single appearance before being sent back to the AHL the next day. He finished the season with Belleville, recording 12 goals and 29 points in 52 games.

In the offseason, he signed a one-year, two-way contract with Ottawa on 25 August. He was placed on waivers and after going unclaimed, was assigned to Belleville for the 2025–26 season. On 12 March 2026, Jeník was traded to the Los Angeles Kings, in exchange for defenceman Samuel Bolduc. He had nine goals and 17 points in 41 games with Belleville.

== Career statistics ==
=== Regular season and playoffs ===
			Regular season					Playoffs
Season	Team	League	GP	G	A	Pts	PIM	GP	G	A	Pts	PIM
2017–18	HC Benátky nad Jizerou	Czech. 1	30	4	7	11	67	—	—	—	—	—
2017–18	Bílí Tygři Liberec	ELH	6	0	0	0	4	—	—	—	—	—
2018–19	HC Benátky nad Jizerou	Czech. 1	13	1	5	6	12	—	—	—	—	—
2018–19	Bílí Tygři Liberec	ELH	10	0	2	2	16	—	—	—	—	—
2018–19	Hamilton Bulldogs	OHL	27	13	17	30	49	2	0	1	1	4
2019–20	Hamilton Bulldogs	OHL	27	22	34	56	30	—	—	—	—	—
2020–21	Ketterä	Mestis	7	5	3	8	6	—	—	—	—	—
2020–21	Tucson Roadrunners	AHL	29	6	8	14	50	1	1	0	1	0
2020–21	Arizona Coyotes	NHL	2	2	0	2	0	—	—	—	—	—
2021–22	Tucson Roadrunners	AHL	51	17	30	47	67	—	—	—	—	—
2021–22	Arizona Coyotes	NHL	13	2	1	3	11	—	—	—	—	—
2022–23	Tucson Roadrunners	AHL	30	7	16	23	50	2	0	2	2	0
2022–23	Arizona Coyotes	NHL	2	0	0	0	4	—	—	—	—	—
2023–24	Tucson Roadrunners	AHL	55	16	20	36	48	2	0	0	0	6
2023–24	Arizona Coyotes	NHL	5	0	1	1	5	—	—	—	—	—
2024–25	Belleville Senators	AHL	52	12	17	29	75	—	—	—	—	—
2024–25	Ottawa Senators	NHL	2	0	0	0	0	—	—	—	—	—
2025–26	Belleville Senators	AHL	41	9	8	17	25	—	—	—	—	—
2025–26	Ontario Reign	AHL	2	0	0	0	4	—	—	—	—	—
ELH totals			16	0	2	2	20	—	—	—	—	—
NHL totals			24	4	2	6	20	—	—	—	—	—

=== International ===
Year	Team	Event	Result	GP	G	A	Pts	PIM
2017	Czech Republic	IH18	2nd place, silver medalist(s)	5	6	1	7	0
2018	Czech Republic	WJC18	4th	7	0	6	6	10
2019	Czech Republic	WJC	7th	3	0	2	2	2
2020	Czech Republic	WJC	7th	3	2	1	3	2
Junior totals				18	8	10	18	14
