= Benoit-Olivier Groulx =

Canadian ice hockey player (born 2000)

- Born: February 6, 2000 (age 26) Rouen, France
- Height: 6 ft 2 in (188 cm)
- Weight: 202 lb (92 kg; 14 st 6 lb)
- Position: Centre
- Shoots: Left
- NHL team Former teams: Toronto Maple Leafs; Anaheim Ducks
- NHL draft: 54th overall, 2018; Anaheim Ducks
- Playing career: 2021–present

Benoit-Olivier "Bo" Groulx (born February 6, 2000) is a French-born Canadian professional ice hockey forward for the Toronto Maple Leafs of the National Hockey League (NHL). Groulx was drafted 54th overall by the Anaheim Ducks in the 2018 NHL entry draft.

== Playing career ==
=== Junior hockey ===
Groulx was selected first overall by the Halifax Mooseheads of the Quebec Major Junior Hockey League (QMJHL) in the 2016 QMJHL entry draft. In his first season with the club, he recorded 14 goals and 17 assists in 62 games. He also skated in six playoff games, scoring one goal and one assist; the Mooseheads were eliminated in the first round by the Rouyn-Noranda Huskies. He returned to the Mooseheads for the 2018–19 season, where he recorded 30 goals and 80 points in 65 games. The Mooseheads were the host team for the 2019 Memorial Cup. Groulx was named a tournament all-star after scoring one goal and four points in four games. In his final season in the QMJHL, Groulx was named captain of the Mooseheads. Groulx was traded from Halifax to the Moncton Wildcats for three draft picks on December 22, 2019. He finished the season with 78 points in 55 games with a plus-minus of plus 20. Groulx won the Guy Carbonneau Trophy as the 2019–20 QJMHL best defensive forward. He was also named the captain of the QMJHL team in the QMJHL–Russia series that took place in November 2019.

=== Professional ===
Groulx was selected by the Anaheim Ducks of the National Hockey League (NHL) in the second round (54th overall) of the 2018 NHL entry draft. On October 10, 2019, the Ducks signed Groulx to a three-year, entry-level contract. Groulx began his professional career with Anaheim's American Hockey League (AHL) affiliate, the San Diego Gulls, in the 2020–21 season, scoring ten goals and 29 points in 42 games and led all AHL rookies in shorthanded points. Groulx made his NHL debut the following season in a 4–1 victory over the Winnipeg Jets on opening night, October 13, 2021. He registered his first assist and point against the Vegas Golden Knights on October 29 and his first goal against the St. Louis Blues on November 7. He was sent down to the Gulls on November 19 after playing in 15 games, scoring one goal and three points. He was recalled on November 28 and played in one game before being sent back down to San Diego.

Groulx spent the majority of the 2022–23 season with San Diego. He was recalled by Anaheim on April 11 and played in two games. He signed a one-year, two-way contract extension with Anaheim on July 14, 2023. He appeared in 45 games with Anaheim, registering two assists.

Following his first four professional seasons within the Ducks organization, Groulx was not tendered a qualifying offer and left as an unrestricted free agent. He was signed to a one-year, two-way contract with the New York Rangers on July 2, 2024. He was assigned to New York's AHL affiliate, the Hartford Wolf Pack, for the 2024–25 season. He was promoted to the Rangers on January 10, 2025.

As a free agent, Groulx left the Rangers after a lone season and was signed to a two-year, $1.63 million contract with the Toronto Maple Leafs on July 1, 2025.

== International play ==
Medal record

Representing Canada

Ice hockey
Gold medal – first place	2017 Ivan Hlinka Memorial Tournament	

Although born in France, Groulx has represented Canada in international competition and has played in the 2016 Winter Youth Olympics where he played six games for Canada scoring four goals with six points. He also competed in the 2016 World U-17 Hockey Challenge where he played for Canada Red. The team finished first in Group B and Groulx played five games for the team, scoring one goal and two points. Although not a tournament regulated by the International Ice Hockey Federation but still considered a major event for under-18 players; Groulx next played in the 2017 Ivan Hlinka Memorial Tournament where he played five games for Canada scoring one goal and three points with six penalty minutes, winning gold with the team.

== Personal life ==
Groulx was born in Rouen, France but grew up in Gatineau, Quebec, Canada. Groulx is the son of Benoit Groulx, a head coach and former professional ice hockey player.

== Career statistics ==
=== Regular season and playoffs ===
			Regular season					Playoffs
Season	Team	League	GP	G	A	Pts	PIM	GP	G	A	Pts	PIM
2016–17	Halifax Mooseheads	QMJHL	62	17	14	31	34	6	1	1	2	4
2017–18	Halifax Mooseheads	QMJHL	68	28	27	55	100	9	2	6	8	14
2018–19	Halifax Mooseheads	QMJHL	65	31	49	80	56	10	4	8	12	12
2019–20	Halifax Mooseheads	QMJHL	26	15	26	41	28	—	—	—	—	—
2019–20	Moncton Wildcats	QMJHL	29	14	23	37	30	—	—	—	—	—
2020–21	San Diego Gulls	AHL	42	10	19	29	24	3	1	0	1	4
2021–22	Anaheim Ducks	NHL	18	1	2	3	2	—	—	—	—	—
2021–22	San Diego Gulls	AHL	40	11	11	22	39	—	—	—	—	—
2022–23	San Diego Gulls	AHL	63	18	21	39	41	—	—	—	—	—
2022–23	Anaheim Ducks	NHL	2	0	0	0	0	—	—	—	—	—
2023–24	Anaheim Ducks	NHL	45	0	2	2	22	—	—	—	—	—
2024–25	Hartford Wolf Pack	AHL	47	15	22	37	42	—	—	—	—	—
2025–26	Toronto Marlies	AHL	59	28	24	52	34	23	8	6	14	24
2025–26	Toronto Maple Leafs	NHL	13	3	2	5	0	—	—	—	—	—
NHL totals			78	4	6	10	24	—	—	—	—	—

=== International ===
Year	Team	Event	Result	GP	G	A	Pts	PIM
2016	Canada	YOG	2nd place, silver medalist(s)	6	4	2	6	7
2016	Canada	U17	9th	5	1	1	2	0
2017	Canada	IH18	1st place, gold medalist(s)	5	2	1	3	6
Junior totals				16	7	4	11	13

== Awards and honours ==
Award	Year
AHL
Calder Cup champion	2026
