= Akil Thomas =

Canadian-American ice hockey player (born 2000)

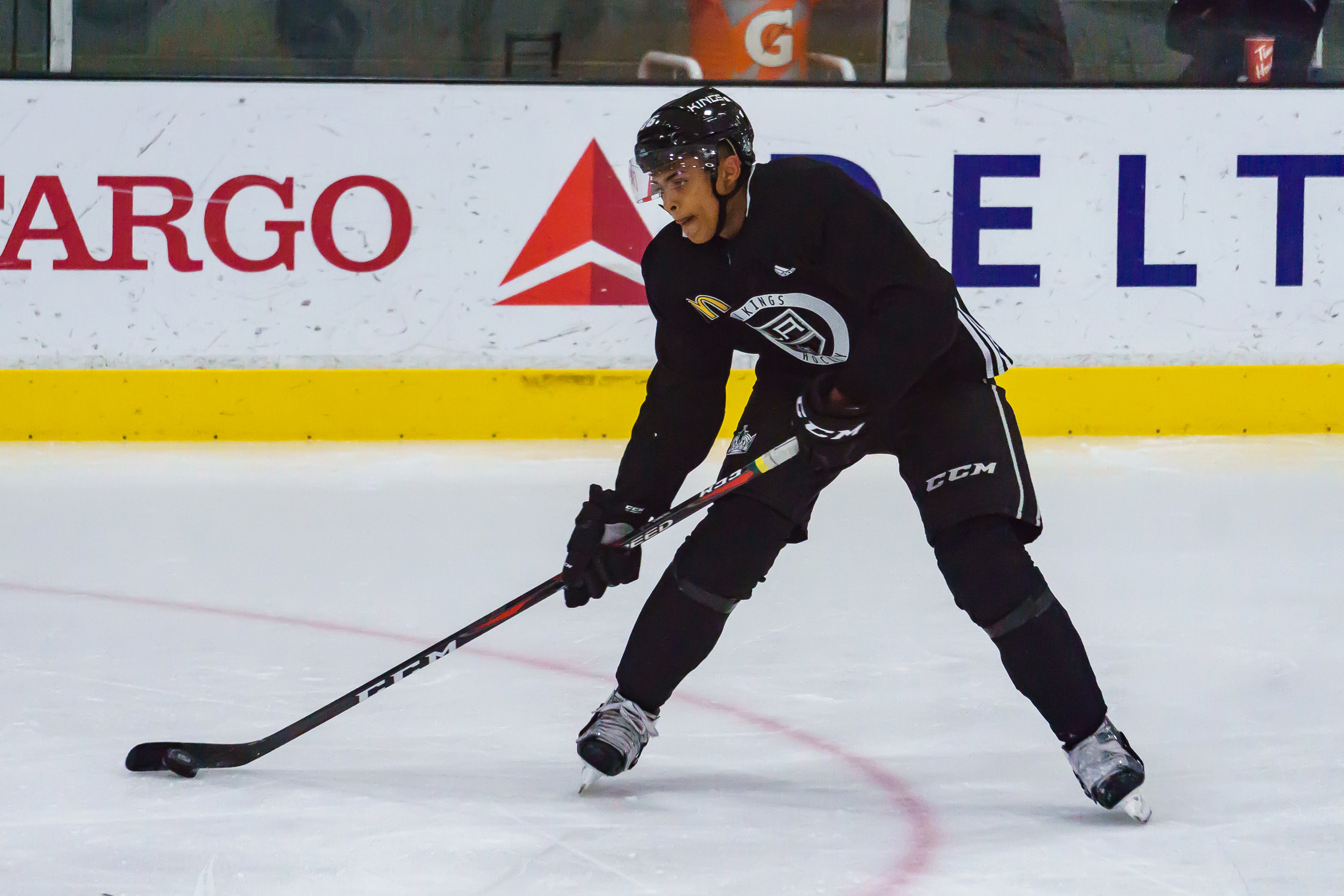
- Thomas with the Los Angeles Kings in 2018
- Born: January 2, 2000 (age 26) Toronto, Ontario, Canada (Note: Many sources mistakenly list Florida as his birthplace.)
- Height: 5 ft 11 in (180 cm)
- Weight: 195 lb (88 kg; 13 st 13 lb)
- Position: Centre
- Shoots: Right
- NHL team Former teams: Vancouver Canucks; Los Angeles Kings
- NHL draft: 51st overall, 2018; Los Angeles Kings
- Playing career: 2021–present

Akil Thomas (born January 2, 2000) is a Canadian-American professional ice hockey player. He is a centre for the Vancouver Canucks of the National Hockey League (NHL). He was selected 51st overall by the Los Angeles Kings in the 2018 NHL entry draft.

Thomas began his major junior hockey career with the Niagara IceDogs in 2016. While with the team, Thomas set a new franchise record for regular-season points scored by a rookie and was named their captain. Upon returning from international competition in 2020, he was traded to the Peterborough Petes.

Internationally, Thomas has represented Team Canada at the 2017 IIHF World U18 Championships, 2017 Ivan Hlinka Memorial Tournament, 2018 IIHF World U18 Championships, and 2020 World Junior Ice Hockey Championships.

== Playing career ==
=== Early career ===
As a youth, Thomas played with the Toronto Marlboros of the Greater Toronto Hockey League (GTHL), where he scored a team-leading 72 points in 56 games. He then played for the St. Michael's Buzzers of the Ontario Junior Hockey League (OJHL) before being selected 12th overall by the Niagara IceDogs at the 2016 Ontario Hockey League (OHL) priority draft. While with the Buzzers, Thomas led the team in playoff points with 13 in seven games. He eventually signed a standard player agreement with the IceDogs on June 4, 2016. Prior to being drafted by the IceDogs, their head scout John Neville described him as a mix of Alex Friesen and Nazem Kadri.

=== Major junior ===
In his first year of the OHL, during the 2016–17 season, Thomas recorded 48 points in 61 games. He scored his first career OHL point in a 3–1 win over the North Bay Battalion on September 23, 2016. He scored his first career OHL goal in the following game to help lead the IceDogs over the Erie Otters. Thomas earned Rookie of the Month for the month of October honours and set a new franchise record for regular season points scored by a rookie. On April 20, 2017, Thomas was named to the OHL's 2017 All-Rookie team. At the end of the 2016–17 season he finished second overall in OHL rookie of the year voting. Due to his success as a rookie, Thomas was named one of the alternate captains for the IceDogs before the 2017–18 OHL season. He finished the regular season leading the team with 81 points and ended the postseason third in team scoring with 11 points in 10 games.

Leading up to the 2018 NHL entry draft, Thomas was considered a first-round draft pick, with the final ranking from the NHL Central Scouting Bureau placing Thomas 15th overall for North American skaters. Thomas was eventually drafted in the second round, 51st overall, by the Los Angeles Kings. After the draft, Thomas stated that he would "make every team that didn't draft me regret it, and that's kind of my mentality for the next few months getting ready for the season."

Prior to the 2018–19 season, Thomas was again named an alternate captain for the IceDogs and was invited to the Los Angeles Kings development camp. Upon returning to the OHL for the new season, he earned OHL Player of the Week honours during its opening week after recording five points in an 8–6 win over the Mississauga Steelheads. Shortly thereafter, Thomas recorded another five point night on October 12, in a 7–2 win over the Barrie Colts. As a result of his overall playmaking ability and skill, the Kings signed Thomas to a three-year, entry-level contract on March 16, 2019. At the time of his signing, Thomas ranked ninth in points and tied for fourth in assists. The day after he signed his contract, Thomas recorded his 100th point of the season. Teammate Ben Jones also recorded his 100th point in the same game, making the pair the first teammates to reach 100 points since 2007–08. During the 2018–19 OHL playoffs, Thomas recorded four points in five games to help the IceDogs beat the North Bay Battalion. In the second round, he was similarly effective, recording two points in three games, however, the IceDogs would lose to the Oshawa Generals.

After attending the Kings rookie camp, Thomas was named the IceDogs captain for the 2019–20 season. In his first three games of the season, Thomas recorded three points and eventually tied the team's franchise record for most assists in a game. The new record came while he recorded a new career high of single game assists with a five assist night in an 8–4 win over the Kingston Frontenacs. On October 19, he was named to 2019 CIBC Canada/Russia Series alongside teammate Philip Tomasino and he recorded a goal in their first game against Russia. After returning from the 2020 IIHF World Junior Championship on January 9, 2020, Thomas was traded to the Peterborough Petes in exchange for Cameron Butler and four draft picks. Throughout his major junior career, Thomas wore number 44 on his jersey. Upon arriving to the Petes, Thomas called the brother of the late Steve Montador to ask for permission to wear the number.

=== Professional ===
On September 22, 2020, Thomas was loaned to Eisbären Berlin of the DEL due to the delayed start of the 2020–21 North American season. After training with them, Thomas returned to North America and attended the Kings' training camp. On January 11, 2021, Thomas was one of 14 players reassigned to their American Hockey League (AHL) affiliate, the Ontario Reign. While with the Reign, Thomas was placed on a line with Quinton Byfield and Devante Smith-Pelly, the first all-black line in professional hockey since Herb Carnegie, Ossie Carnegie, and Manny McIntyre in the 1940s. During their first game together, Thomas recorded a natural hat-trick and his line combined for six points in the eventual win. Shortly following this game, Thomas was recalled to the Kings' taxi squad where he would be able to practice and travel with the team. At the time, he had accumulated 13 points over 23 AHL games. However, he was reassigned to the Ontario Reign the following day without playing any games. He finished the shortened 2020–21 season with 26 points in 40 games. At the conclusion of the season, Thomas underwent two shoulder surgeries and returned to the Reign for the 2021–22 season in December 2021.

Thomas began the 2022–23 season strong, tallying four goals and two assists for six points through eight games. He added seven more points before undergoing season-ending shoulder surgery in late November. On July 8, 2023, the Kings signed Thomas to a one-year two-way contract extension worth an average annual value of $775,000.

In the first year of his new contract, Thomas set new career highs in goals, assists and points. Prior to being called up to the NHL level, Thomas was recognized as the AHL Player of the Week for tallying four goals and two assists over three games. Thomas was called up to the NHL level on March 31 and made NHL debut on April 1 against the Winnipeg Jets.

During the 2025–26 season, on December 2, 2025, Thomas was traded by the Kings to the St. Louis Blues in exchange for Nikita Alexandrov.

After a half season within the Blues organization, Thomas left to sign as a free agent to a one-year, two-way contract with the Vancouver Canucks for the 2026–27 season on July 1, 2026.

== International play ==
Medal record

Representing Canada

Ice hockey

World Junior Championships
Gold medal – first place	2020 Czech Republic	

Thomas holds dual citizenship with Canada and the United States and has chosen to represent Canada internationally. In 2016, Thomas was selected to represent Canada White at the 2016 World U-17 Hockey Challenge in Sault Ste. Marie, Ontario. He was named an alternate captain as well and scored 3 points in 5 games.

Thomas again represented Canada when he played on Team Canada's under-18 team at the 2017 IIHF World U18 Championships in Slovakia, where Canada placed 5th overall. In the same year, he also represented Canada during the 2017 Ivan Hlinka Memorial Tournament, where he scored 6 points to help Canada win their 21st gold title. After the IceDogs were eliminated from the playoffs, Thomas was selected to play for Team Canada at the 2018 IIHF World U18 Championships. He recorded two points in four games and Canada placed fifth overall in the tournament.

On December 21, Thomas was named to Team Canada's roster for the 2020 World Junior Ice Hockey Championships. He played on the fourth line during the tournament and recorded his only goal in the gold medal round against Russia, the gold medal-winning goal. As a result of his achievement, the Regional Municipality of Niagara deemed January 9, 2020, as "Akil Thomas Day."

== Personal life ==
Thomas's mother is of Barbadian heritage, and his father, Kahlil, is originally from Toronto. His father played hockey with the Toronto Maple Leafs American Hockey League affiliate, the St. John's Maple Leafs. Akil joins his father in the scoring of a championship goal, Kahlil playing for the (then) Memphis RiverKings of the CHL scored the goal which won Memphis the second of two Ray Miron President's Cups in 2002–03. His uncle Leo Thomas also played minor hockey, including some years with the Mississippi RiverKings and Fort Wayne Komets. In May 2018, his uncle was named head coach of the Macon Mayhem of the Southern Professional Hockey League, becoming the first black head coach for a professional ice hockey team in North America since John Paris Jr. accomplished the feat in the 1990s. Thomas is a dual citizen of the United States and Canada.

Thomas was born in Toronto; however, his family regularly moved around due to his dad's minor hockey career. After his father retired from hockey the family decided to stay in Orlando, Florida, which Thomas lists as his hometown. However, when Thomas was 11 the family decided to move back to Toronto to allow for him to get better hockey-related opportunities. Growing up, Thomas attended St. Michael's College School, where he was advised to skip a grade thus allowing Thomas to enroll in classes at Brock University.

While playing with the Toronto Marlboros, Thomas made a cameo appearance in the film Soul On Ice: Past, Present & Future, which discusses the history of black players in hockey. His appearance was due to the director, Damon Kwame Mason, being a personal family friend. Thomas also runs a clothing company called Zale Apparel with his friend Ethan Low which embraces his Barbadian heritage.

== Career statistics ==
=== Regular season and playoffs ===
			Regular season					Playoffs
Season	Team	League	GP	G	A	Pts	PIM	GP	G	A	Pts	PIM
2016–17	Niagara IceDogs	OHL	61	21	27	48	17	4	0	0	0	0
2017–18	Niagara IceDogs	OHL	68	22	59	81	36	10	5	6	11	6
2018–19	Niagara IceDogs	OHL	63	38	64	102	40	8	3	3	6	4
2019–20	Niagara IceDogs	OHL	27	15	29	44	30	—	—	—	—	—
2019–20	Peterborough Petes	OHL	22	9	31	40	26	—	—	—	—	—
2020–21	Ontario Reign	AHL	40	11	15	26	12	1	1	0	1	0
2021–22	Ontario Reign	AHL	40	8	5	13	13	4	4	0	4	4
2022–23	Ontario Reign	AHL	13	5	3	8	8	—	—	—	—	—
2023–24	Ontario Reign	AHL	64	22	24	46	41	8	2	3	5	4
2023–24	Los Angeles Kings	NHL	7	3	1	4	2	—	—	—	—	—
2024–25	Los Angeles Kings	NHL	25	1	2	3	7	—	—	—	—	—
2025–26	Ontario Reign	AHL	19	4	9	13	2	—	—	—	—	—
2025–26	Springfield Thunderbirds	AHL	20	5	4	9	14	12	3	3	6	0
NHL totals			32	4	3	7	9	—	—	—	—	—

=== International ===
Year	Team	Event	Result	GP	G	A	Pts	PIM
2016	Canada White	U17	4th	6	2	1	3	2
2017	Canada	U18	5th	5	0	0	0	2
2017	Canada	IH18	1st place, gold medalist(s)	5	2	4	6	0
2018	Canada	U18	5th	4	1	1	2	0
2020	Canada	WJC	1st place, gold medalist(s)	7	1	1	2	0
Junior totals				27	6	7	13	4

== Awards and honours ==
Award	Year	Ref
OHL
First All-Rookie Team	2017	
