= Carl Jakobsson =

Swedish ice hockey player

- Born: 13 July 2000 (age 25) Limhamn, Sweden
- Height: 6 ft 1 in (185 cm)
- Weight: 190 lb (86 kg; 13 st 8 lb)
- Position: Forward
- Shoots: Left
- Liiga team Former teams: Oulun Kärpät; Färjestad BK
- Playing career: 2017–present

Carl Jakobsson (born 13 July 2000) is a professional Swedish Ice Hockey player. He is currently playing with Oulun Kärpät in the Finnish Liiga.

He previously spent his professional career with Färjestad BK in the Swedish Hockey League (SHL). His youth team was Visby AIK.

== Awards and honours ==
Award	Year
SHL
Le Mat Trophy (Färjestad BK)	2022
