= Albin Eriksson =

Swedish ice hockey player (born 2000)

- Born: 20 July 2000 (age 25) Bollnäs, Sweden
- Height: 6 ft 4 in (193 cm)
- Weight: 207 lb (94 kg; 14 st 11 lb)
- Position: Right wing/Left Wing
- Shoots: Right
- Allsv team Former teams: Almtuna IS; Skellefteå AIK; Färjestad BK; Ässät; Ilves
- NHL draft: 44th overall, 2018; Dallas Stars
- Playing career: 2018–present

Albin Eriksson (born 20 July 2000) is a Swedish ice hockey winger who is currently playing with the Almtuna IS in the HockeyAllsvenskan (Allsv). Eriksson was selected in the second round, 44th overall, of the 2018 NHL entry draft by the Dallas Stars.

== Playing career ==
Eriksson made his Swedish Hockey League debut playing with Skellefteå AIK during the 2017–18 SHL season.

In his third season within Skellefteå AIK's squad in the 2019–20 season, Erikdsson was loaned for a month as an injury replacement to Modo Hockey of the HockeyAllsvenskan on 14 November 2019. Eriksson made just 3 appearances during his time with Modo before returning to Skellefteå AIK. Registering 2 assists in 17 games, Eriksson left SAIK and transferred to fellow SHL club Färjestad BK, signing a two-year contract, on 22 January 2020. He added 1 assist in 12 further games before the season was cancelled due to COVID-19.

After three seasons in the Allsvenskan with BIK Karlskoga and Östersunds IK, Eriksson continued in the league by signing a one-year deal with Almtuna IS on 7 August 2025.

== Career statistics ==
=== Regular season and playoffs ===
			Regular season					Playoffs
Season	Team	League	GP	G	A	Pts	PIM	GP	G	A	Pts	PIM
2016–17	Skellefteå AIK	J20	32	9	6	15	22	—	—	—	—	—
2017–18	Skellefteå AIK	J20	38	22	18	40	86	3	0	6	6	2
2017–18	Skellefteå AIK	SHL	17	0	1	1	6	2	0	0	0	0
2018–19	Skellefteå AIK	J20	5	3	2	5	0	—	—	—	—	—
2018–19	Skellefteå AIK	SHL	44	9	7	16	29	6	1	0	1	0
2019–20	Skellefteå AIK	J20	4	1	0	1	29	—	—	—	—	—
2019–20	Skellefteå AIK	SHL	17	0	2	2	6	—	—	—	—	—
2019–20	Modo Hockey	Allsv	3	0	0	0	2	—	—	—	—	—
2019–20	Färjestad BK	J20	1	1	0	1	0	—	—	—	—	—
2019–20	Färjestad BK	SHL	12	0	1	1	0	—	—	—	—	—
2020–21	Färjestad BK	SHL	36	0	4	4	0	—	—	—	—	—
2021–22	Ässät	Jr. A	1	0	1	1	0	—	—	—	—	—
2021–22	Ässät	Liiga	34	4	5	9	6	—	—	—	—	—
2021–22	Ilves	Liiga	4	1	0	1	2	—	—	—	—	—
2022–23	BIK Karlskoga	Allsv	47	20	15	35	10	4	0	0	0	4
2023–24	BIK Karlskoga	Allsv	44	7	5	12	18	12	2	1	3	6
2024–25	Östersunds IK	Allsv	48	6	4	10	4	—	—	—	—	—
SHL totals			126	9	15	24	41	8	1	0	1	0
Liiga totals			38	5	5	10	8	—	—	—	—	—

Medal record

Representing Sweden

Ice hockey

World Junior Championships
Bronze medal – third place	2020 Czech Republic	

=== International ===
Year	Team	Event	GP	G	A	Pts	PIM
2017	Sweden	IH18	5	0	1	1	27
2020	Sweden	WJC	7	1	0	1	0
Junior totals			12	1	1	2	27
