= Kevin Bahl =

Canadian ice hockey player (born 2000)

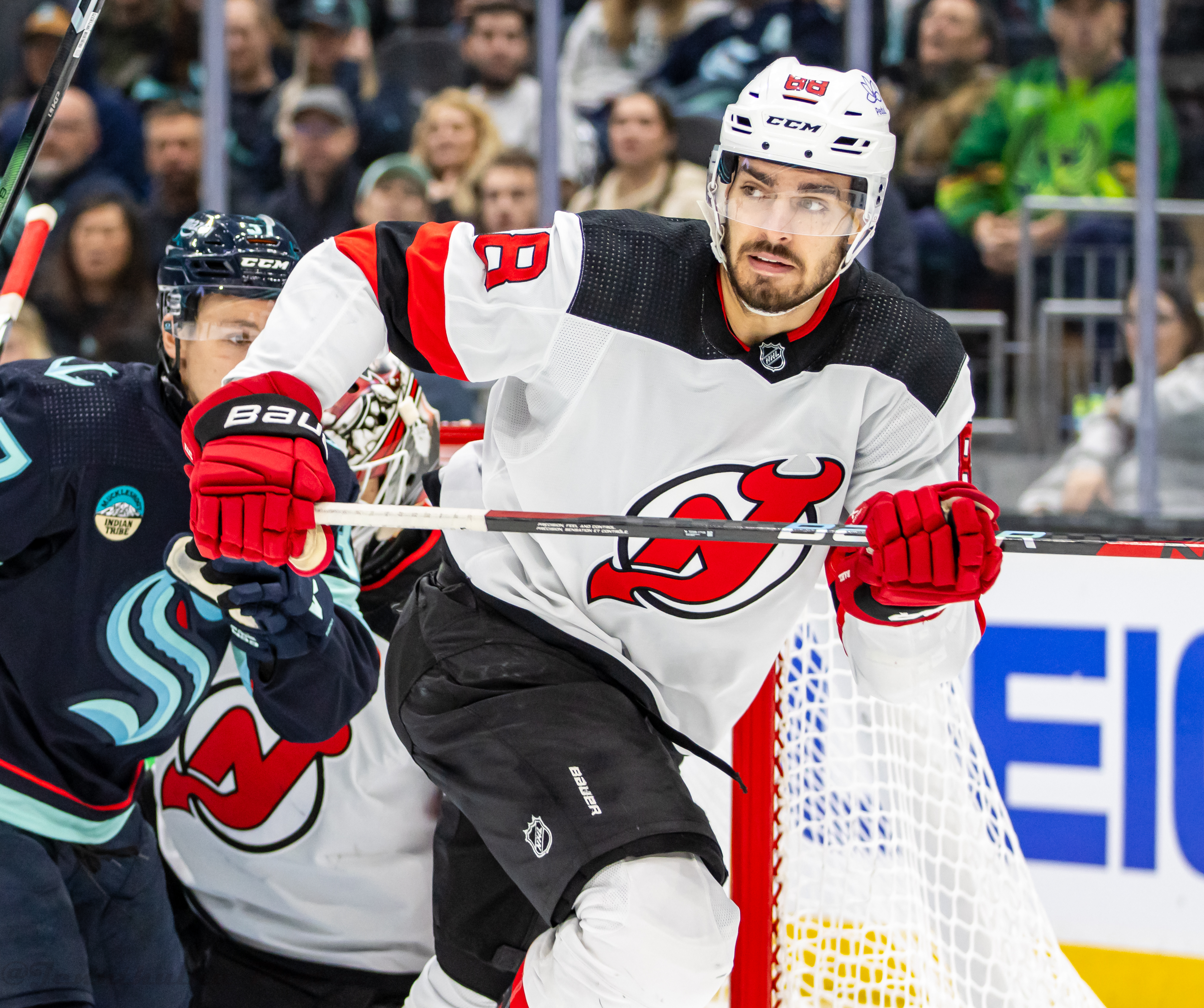
- Bahl with the New Jersey Devils in 2023
- Born: June 27, 2000 (age 26) New Westminster, British Columbia, Canada
- Height: 6 ft 6 in (198 cm)
- Weight: 230 lb (104 kg; 16 st 6 lb)
- Position: Defence
- Shoots: Left
- NHL team Former teams: Calgary Flames; New Jersey Devils
- NHL draft: 55th overall, 2018; Arizona Coyotes
- Playing career: 2021–present

Kevin Bahl (born June 27, 2000) is a Canadian professional ice hockey player who is a defenceman for the Calgary Flames of the National Hockey League (NHL). He was drafted by the Arizona Coyotes 55th overall, in the second round of the 2018 NHL entry draft.

== Early life ==
Bahl was born on June 27, 2000, in New Westminster, British Columbia, Canada to father Jonathan. He is of Indian Punjabi and European heritage. His sister, Kristina, played college ice hockey for St. Lawrence University and has represented Team Canada at the international level. Although he was born in British Columbia, the family had moved to Mississauga by the time his sister was born. While growing up in Mississauga, Bahl originally preferred to play soccer but switched to ice hockey after a head-on-head collision with another player during a game. Once he became serious about the sport, Bahl trained at the Canadian Ice Academy.

== Playing career ==
=== Amateur ===
Bahl played for the Toronto Marlboros in the Greater Toronto Hockey League (GTHL). During the 2015–16 season, Bahl tallied 10 goals and 28 assists for 38 points through 63 games. At the end of the season, Bahl was drafted in the second round, 31st overall, by the Ottawa 67's of the Ontario Hockey League (OHL). Bahl made his debut for the 67s as a 16-year-old rookie during the 2016–17 season as a result of injuries to their lineup. He scored his first OHL goal against the Kingston Frontenacs on November 30, 2016. Bahl quickly established himself as a mainstay in the Ottawa lineup, with physicality and responsible defensive zone play. He finished his rookie season with one goal and three assists through 57 regular season games. He also received the team's Rookie Of The Year award. As the team tried to place most of its players in the city, Bahl was enrolled at Blyth Academy while in high school.

During the 2017 off-season, Bahl earned a gold medal with Team Canada at the 2017 Ivan Hlinka Memorial Tournament. Before the start of the 2017–18 season, the 67s made numerous personnel changes including hiring André Tourigny as their new head coach. Entering his sophomore season, Bahl was considered a player to watch and was expected to have a breakout season. He began the season strong by recording eight assists through his first 17 games. He was subsequently named to Team OHL for the 2017 CIBC Canada Russia Summit Series. Off the ice, Bahl received the OHL East Division Academic Player of the Month for October after he maintained an 86% average in his grade 12 University level coursework. In late January, it was revealed that Bahl was ranked #30 among all draft-eligible player in the NHL Central Scouting Bureau's Midterm Rankings. He was selected for Team Orr at the CHL/NHL Top Prospects game, where he tallied a goal and an assist. On February 8, Bahl served a 10-game suspension after he checked a player in the head during a game against the Peterborough Petes. As the season continued, Bahl set new career-highs in assists and points to move his NHL Draft ranking up one spot to #29. While participating at the NHL draft combine, Bahl had 23 interviews with NHL team who were considering drafting him. He was eventually drafted 55th overall by the Arizona Coyotes in the second round of the 2018 NHL entry draft.

After being drafted, Bahl participated in the Coyotes' Development and Rookie Camp before rejoining the Ottawa 67's for the 2018–19 season. He began the season by accumulating two goals and four assists for six points through 11 games and was selected to participate in the 2018 CIBC Canada Russia Summit Series. Bahl continued to improve offensively throughout the season while playing on the 67's top pair with Noel Hoefenmayer. Bahl later credited his success to the Ottawa coaches and Coyotes Development coach Alex Henry. He finished the season with six goals and 28 assists through 68 games to rank third-best in the league. His improvements offensively also helped the 67s set a franchise record for regular season points with 106. Prior to the start of the 2019 OHL Playoffs, Bahl signed a three-year, entry-level contract with the Coyotes. During their postseason run, Bahl and the 67s outscored opponents 47–20 in their first eight playoff games. He finished the playoffs with one goal and 10 assists for 11 points through 15 games. His first career playoff goal came against the Sudbury Wolves in Game 1 of the Second Round.

During his final season of junior hockey in the 2019–20 season, Bahl was on pace for the best numbers of his career. When the season was cut short due to the COVID-19 pandemic, Bahl had recorded six goals and 25 assists through 54 games. On December 16, 2019, Bahl was included by the Coyotes in a trade along with Nick Merkley, Nate Schnarr, a conditional first-round pick in 2020, and a conditional third-round pick in 2021 to the New Jersey Devils in exchange for Taylor Hall and Blake Speers.

=== Professional ===
==== New Jersey Devils ====
Upon concluding his major junior career, Bahl participated in the Devils' abbreviated training camp before reporting to their American Hockey League (AHL) affiliate, the Binghamton Devils, to start the 2020–21 season. He tallied five points through 26 games before being recalled to the NHL level on April 29. He subsequently made his NHL debut that night and was plus-1 with three hits and a blocked shot in 15:01 of ice time against the Philadelphia Flyers. Bahl recorded his first career NHL point, an assist, in his second career game on May 1, against the Flyers. When speaking about his rookie season, Bahl praised the experience he gained and focused on improving his play during the summer. He finished the season with two assists and 18 hits while averaging 16:55 in ice time in seven games with the New Jersey Devils. At the AHL level, he had accumulated one goal and four assists for five points through 27 games.

Bahl returned to the New Jersey Devils Development Camp but was reassigned to their new AHL affiliate, the Utica Comets, for the 2021–22 season after a poor showing at training camp. He accumulated two assists through 19 games before being recalled to the NHL level on December 13. After being reassigned to the AHL in early January, Bahl stepped more into his shutdown defenceman role. He added eight assists and two goals through 17 more games as the Comets led the Eastern Conference with a 28–9–5–0 record. By April 1, Bahl ranked third among team defencemen with 16 points through 51 games and third among league defencemen with a +17 rating.

==== Calgary Flames ====
On June 19, 2024, Bahl was traded to the Calgary Flames along with a first-round pick in 2025 in exchange for goaltender Jacob Markström.

On June 28, 2025, Bahl signed a six-year, $32.1 million contract with the Flames.

== Career statistics ==
=== Regular season and playoffs ===
			Regular season					Playoffs
Season	Team	League	GP	G	A	Pts	PIM	GP	G	A	Pts	PIM
2015–16	Toronto Marlboros	GTHL	56	9	27	36	33	—	—	—	—	—
2016–17	Ottawa 67's	OHL	57	1	3	4	53	6	0	0	0	0
2017–18	Ottawa 67's	OHL	58	1	17	18	76	5	0	0	0	4
2018–19	Ottawa 67's	OHL	68	6	28	34	87	15	1	10	11	8
2019–20	Ottawa 67's	OHL	54	6	25	31	83	—	—	—	—	—
2020–21	Binghamton Devils	AHL	27	1	4	5	12	—	—	—	—	—
2020–21	New Jersey Devils	NHL	7	0	2	2	0	—	—	—	—	—
2021–22	Utica Comets	AHL	54	3	13	16	52	5	0	0	0	10
2021–22	New Jersey Devils	NHL	17	1	3	4	10	—	—	—	—	—
2022–23	Utica Comets	AHL	3	0	1	1	2	—	—	—	—	—
2022–23	New Jersey Devils	NHL	42	2	6	8	35	11	0	1	1	31
2023–24	New Jersey Devils	NHL	82	1	10	11	82	—	—	—	—	—
2024–25	Calgary Flames	NHL	73	3	17	20	35	—	—	—	—	—
2025–26	Calgary Flames	NHL	76	4	14	18	47	—	—	—	—	—
NHL totals			297	11	52	63	209	11	0	1	1	31

=== International ===
Medal record

Representing Canada

Men's ice hockey

World Junior Championships
Gold medal – first place	2020 Czech Republic	

Year	Team	Event	Result	GP	G	A	Pts	PIM
2016	Canada Red	U17	6th	5	0	1	1	6
2017	Canada	IH18	1st place, gold medalist(s)	5	1	1	2	6
2018	Canada	U18	5th	5	1	2	3	2
2020	Canada	WJC	1st place, gold medalist(s)	7	0	1	1	6
Junior totals				22	2	5	7	20

== Awards and honours ==
Award	Year	Ref
OHL
Second All-Star Team	2020	
