= Adam Ginning =

Swedish ice hockey player (born 2000)

- Born: 13 January 2000 (age 26) Linköping, Sweden
- Height: 6 ft 4 in (193 cm)
- Weight: 196 lb (89 kg; 14 st 0 lb)
- Position: Defence
- Shoots: Left
- NHL team (P) Cur. team Former teams: Vegas Golden Knights; Henderson Silver Knights (AHL); Linköping HC; Färjestad BK; Philadelphia Flyers
- NHL draft: 50th overall, 2018; Philadelphia Flyers
- Playing career: 2017–present

Adam Ginning (born 13 January 2000) is a Swedish professional ice hockey defenceman who currently plays with the Henderson Silver Knights in the American Hockey League (AHL) while under contract to the Vegas Golden Knights of the National Hockey League (NHL). He was selected by the Philadelphia Flyers in the second round, 50th overall, of the 2018 NHL entry draft.

== Playing career ==
Ginning played as a youth within Linköping HC junior program.

Ginning played his first four professional seasons with Linköping HC before his contract expired and was not extended following the 2019–20 season. On 6 May 2020, Ginning as a free agent agreed to an initial one-year contract with fellow SHL club, Färjestad BK.

Having claimed the Swedish Championship with Färjestad BK in the 2021–22 season, Ginning was signed to a two-year, entry-level contract with the Philadelphia Flyers on 18 May 2022.

As a free agent from the Flyers after four seasons within the organization, Ginning was signed to a two-year, $1.75 million contract with the Vegas Golden Knights on 1 July 2026.

== Career statistics ==
=== Regular season and playoffs ===
			Regular season					Playoffs
Season	Team	League	GP	G	A	Pts	PIM	GP	G	A	Pts	PIM
2016–17	Linköping HC	J20	29	0	10	10	14	1	0	1	1	0
2016–17	Linköping HC	SHL	12	0	2	2	6	2	0	0	0	0
2017–18	Linköping HC	J20	17	1	5	6	22	—	—	—	—	—
2017–18	Linköping HC	SHL	28	1	1	2	10	7	0	1	1	2
2018–19	Linköping HC	SHL	48	1	4	5	49	—	—	—	—	—
2018–19	Linköping HC	J20	—	—	—	—	—	6	2	2	4	10
2019–20	Linköping HC	SHL	27	2	1	3	35	—	—	—	—	—
2019–20	Linköping HC	J20	6	3	1	4	6	—	—	—	—	—
2019–20	HC Vita Hästen	Allsv	17	0	4	4	44	—	—	—	—	—
2020–21	Färjestad BK	SHL	50	3	9	12	53	6	0	0	0	6
2021–22	Färjestad BK	SHL	51	1	4	5	42	19	3	2	5	2
2022–23	Lehigh Valley Phantoms	AHL	68	3	16	19	63	3	0	0	0	0
2022–23	Philadelphia Flyers	NHL	1	0	0	0	2	—	—	—	—	—
2023–24	Lehigh Valley Phantoms	AHL	58	2	13	15	82	6	0	1	1	6
2023–24	Philadelphia Flyers	NHL	9	1	0	1	0	—	—	—	—	—
2024–25	Lehigh Valley Phantoms	AHL	69	2	15	17	71	7	0	3	3	8
2024–25	Philadelphia Flyers	NHL	1	0	0	0	0	—	—	—	—	—
2025–26	Lehigh Valley Phantoms	AHL	42	2	6	8	26	—	—	—	—	—
2025–26	Philadelphia Flyers	NHL	5	0	0	0	0	—	—	—	—	—
SHL totals			216	8	21	29	195	34	3	3	6	10
NHL totals			16	1	0	1	2	—	—	—	—	—

Medal record

Representing Sweden

Ice hockey

IIHF World U18 Championship
Bronze medal – third place	2018 Russia	

World Junior Championships
Bronze medal – third place	2020 Czech Republic	

=== International ===
Year	Team	Event	Result	GP	G	A	Pts	PIM
2016	Sweden	U17	1st place, gold medalist(s)	6	0	0	0	10
2017	Sweden	U18	4th	7	0	1	1	8
2017	Sweden	IH18	3rd place, bronze medalist(s)	5	1	3	4	8
2018	Sweden	U18	3rd place, bronze medalist(s)	7	1	3	4	18
2019	Sweden	WJC	5th	4	0	0	0	2
2020	Sweden	WJC	3rd place, bronze medalist(s)	7	0	3	3	16
Junior totals				36	2	10	12	62

== Awards and honors ==
Award	Year
SHL
Le Mat Trophy (Färjestad BK)	2022
