= David Gustafsson =

Swedish ice hockey player (born 2000)

- Born: 11 April 2000 (age 26) Tingsryd, Sweden
- Height: 6 ft 1 in (185 cm)
- Weight: 194 lb (88 kg; 13 st 12 lb)
- Position: Centre
- Shoots: Left
- NHL team (P) Cur. team Former teams: Pittsburgh Penguins; WBS Penguins (AHL); HV71; Winnipeg Jets
- NHL draft: 60th overall, 2018; Winnipeg Jets
- Playing career: 2017–present

David Gustafsson (born 11 April 2000) is a Swedish professional ice hockey center for the Wilkes-Barre/Scranton Penguins in the American Hockey League (AHL) while under contract to the Pittsburgh Penguins of the National Hockey League (NHL). He was drafted 60th overall by the Winnipeg Jets in the 2018 NHL entry draft. Gustafsson was traded to the Pittsburgh Penguins in June 2026.

== Playing career ==
Gustafsson made his Swedish Hockey League debut as a 17-year old playing with HV71 during the 2017–18 SHL season. He registered 6 goals and 12 points in 45 games.

After his selection to the Jets in the 2018 NHL entry draft, Gustafsson played through his second full season in 2018–19 with HV71 posting 2 goals and 12 points in 36 games.

=== Winnipeg Jets ===
On 13 June 2019, Gustafsson was signed by the Winnipeg Jets to a three-year, entry-level contract. Gustafsson scored his first NHL goal on 27 November 2019, against the San Jose Sharks.

On 27 August 2020, following the Jets' elimination from the 2020 Stanley Cup playoffs, Gustafsson returned to Sweden, joining Tingsryds AIF of the HockeyAllsvenskan on loan until the commencement of the delayed 2020–21 North American season.

=== Pittsburgh Penguins ===
On 29 June 2026, Gustafsson was traded by the Jets to the Pittsburgh Penguins in exchange for Jack St. Ivany. As a restricted free agent, Gustafsson was signed to the one-year, two-way contract extension with the Penguins for the 2026–27 season on 5 July 2026.

== Career statistics ==
=== Regular season and playoffs ===
			Regular season					Playoffs
Season	Team	League	GP	G	A	Pts	PIM	GP	G	A	Pts	PIM
2016–17	HV71	J20	32	5	7	12	10	7	2	1	3	0
2017–18	HV71	J20	4	1	4	5	2	5	2	3	5	4
2017–18	HV71	SHL	45	6	6	12	8	2	0	0	0	0
2018–19	HV71	SHL	36	2	10	12	10	9	1	3	4	6
2018–19	HV71	J20	1	0	2	2	0	—	—	—	—	—
2019–20	Winnipeg Jets	NHL	22	1	0	1	0	—	—	—	—	—
2019–20	Manitoba Moose	AHL	13	2	5	7	2	—	—	—	—	—
2020–21	Tingsryds AIF	Allsv	16	7	10	17	6	—	—	—	—	—
2020–21	Manitoba Moose	AHL	22	7	12	19	4	—	—	—	—	—
2020–21	Winnipeg Jets	NHL	4	0	0	0	0	—	—	—	—	—
2021–22	Manitoba Moose	AHL	47	15	15	30	10	5	0	1	1	0
2021–22	Winnipeg Jets	NHL	2	0	0	0	0	—	—	—	—	—
2022–23	Winnipeg Jets	NHL	46	0	6	6	6	3	0	0	0	0
2023–24	Winnipeg Jets	NHL	39	3	4	7	0	4	1	0	1	2
2023–24	Manitoba Moose	AHL	6	0	3	3	2	—	—	—	—	—
2024–25	Winnipeg Jets	NHL	36	2	4	6	7	4	1	0	1	0
2025–26	Manitoba Moose	AHL	48	10	22	32	12	7	1	3	4	2
SHL totals			81	8	16	24	18	11	1	3	4	6
NHL totals			149	6	14	20	13	11	2	0	2	2

Medal record

Representing Sweden

Ice hockey

World Junior Championships
Bronze medal – third place	2020 Czech Republic	

IIHF World U18 Championship
Bronze medal – third place	2018 Russia	

=== International ===
Year	Team	Event	Result	GP	G	A	Pts	PIM
2016	Sweden	U17	1st place, gold medalist(s)	6	2	3	5	4
2017	Sweden	U18	4th	7	2	0	2	4
2017	Sweden	IH18	3rd place, bronze medalist(s)	5	1	3	4	4
2018	Sweden	U18	3rd place, bronze medalist(s)	7	2	5	7	16
2019	Sweden	WJC	5th	5	0	3	3	6
2020	Sweden	WJC	3rd place, bronze medalist(s)	7	1	3	4	4
Junior totals				37	8	17	25	38
