= Martin Bučko =

Slovak ice hockey player

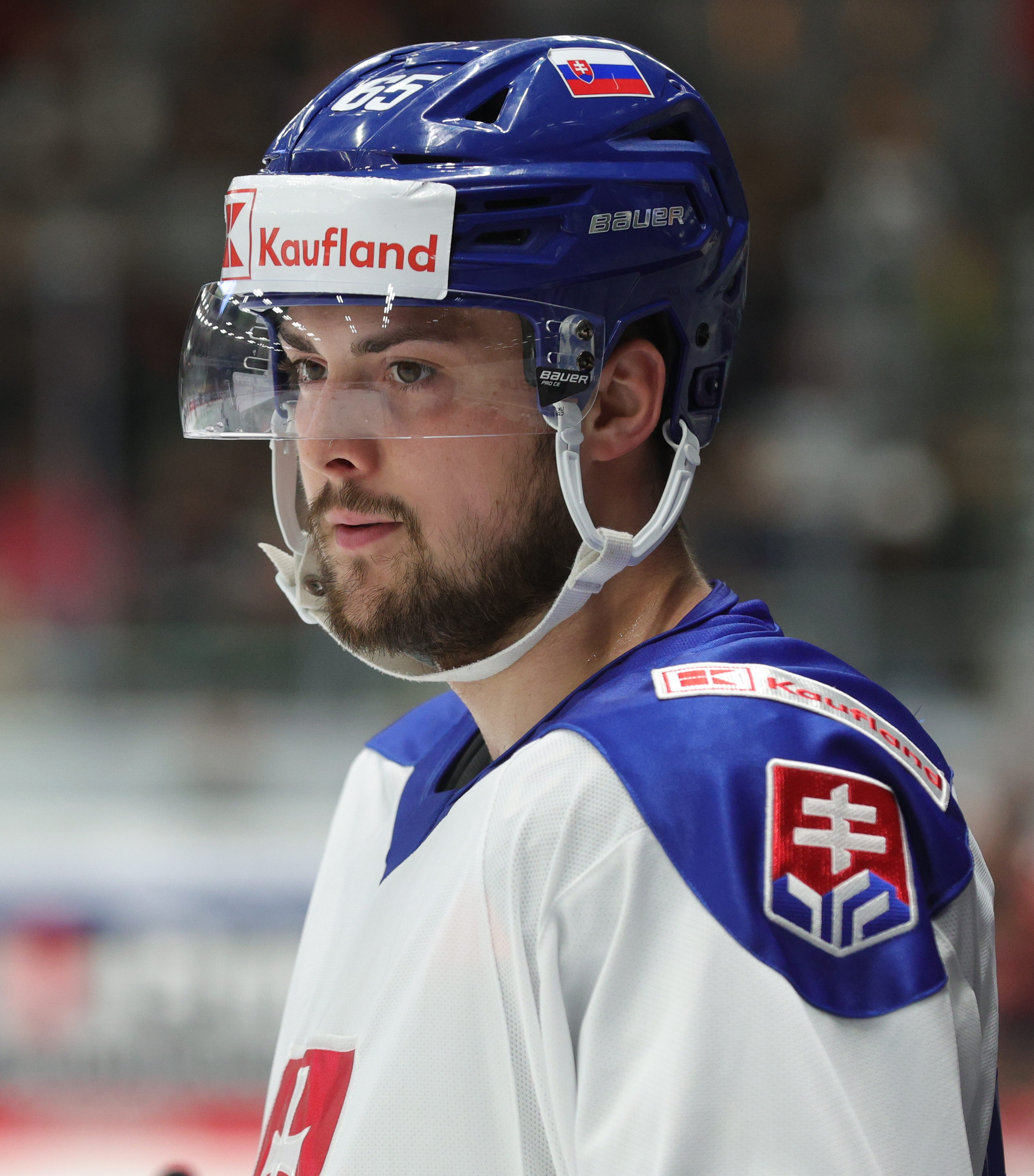
- Martin Bučko, 2024
- Born: 13 May 2000 (age 25) Martin, Slovakia
- Height: 6 ft 2 in (188 cm)
- Weight: 174 lb (79 kg; 12 st 6 lb)
- Position: Defence
- Shoots: Right
- Slovak team Former teams: HC Košice; Mountfield HK; MHC Martin; HC Stadion Vrchlabí; HC Košice; MsHK Žilina; Motor České Budějovice; HC Dynamo Pardubice
- National team: Slovakia
- Playing career: 2018–present

Martin Bučko (born 13 May 2000) is a Slovak professional ice hockey defenceman who is currently playing for the HC Košice of the Slovak Extraliga.

== League play ==
Martin Bučko started his senior career in 2019 with HC Košice. In 2020, he transferred to HC Dynamo Pardubice and in the subsequent years played in the various Czech Extraliga teams. In 2005, he announced a return to Košice.

== International play ==
He was selected to make his full IIHF international debut, participating for Slovakia in the 2021 IIHF World Championship.

== Career statistics ==
=== Regular season and playoffs ===
			Regular season					Playoffs
Season	Team	League	GP	G	A	Pts	PIM	GP	G	A	Pts	PIM
2015–16	MHC Martin	Slovak-Jr.	18	1	2	3	4	2	0	0	0	0
2016–17	HC Dynamo Pardubice	Czech-Jr.	2	0	0	0	2	—	—	—	—	—
2016–17	Team Slovakia U18	Slovak-Jr.	8	0	2	2	2	—	—	—	—	—
2017–18	HC Dynamo Pardubice	Czech-Jr.	33	2	7	9	10	—	—	—	—	—
2018–19	HC Stadion Vrchlabí	Czech.2	9	0	2	2	2	—	—	—	—	—
2019–20	HC Košice	Slovak-Jr.	13	3	5	8	6	—	—	—	—	—
2019–20	HC Košice	Slovak	31	0	1	1	4	—	—	—	—	—
2019–20	MsHKM Žilina	Slovak-Jr.	5	3	2	5	4	—	—	—	—	—
2019–20	MsHK Žilina	Slovak.1	2	1	1	2	0	—	—	—	—	—
2020–21	HC Dynamo Pardubice	Czech	23	0	1	1	2	8	0	0	0	4
2020–21	HC Stadion Vrchlabí	Czech.1	14	0	4	4	4	—	—	—	—	—
2021–22	Motor České Budějovice	Czech	33	1	1	2	2	9	0	0	0	2
2022–23	HC Dynamo Pardubice	Czech	26	1	1	2	4	—	—	—	—	—
2023-24	HC Dynamo Pardubice	Czech	22	1	6	7	2	—	—	—	—	—
2023-24	HC Dynamo Pardubice B	Czech.1	16	0	6	6	6	—	—	—	—	—
2023-24	HC Škoda Plzeň	Czech	11	1	1	2	0	3	0	1	1	0
Czech totals			115	4	10	14	10	20	0	1	1	6
Slovak totals			31	0	1	1	4	—	—	—	—	—

=== International ===
Year	Team	Event	Result	GP	G	A	Pts	PIM
2017	Slovakia	IH18	8th	4	1	1	2	0
2018	Slovakia	WJC18	7th	5	1	1	2	0
2020	Slovakia	WJC	8th	5	0	0	0	2
2021	Slovakia	WC	8th	5	1	0	1	0
Junior totals				14	2	2	4	2
Senior totals				5	1	0	1	0
