= Jared McIsaac =

Canadian ice hockey player (born 2000)

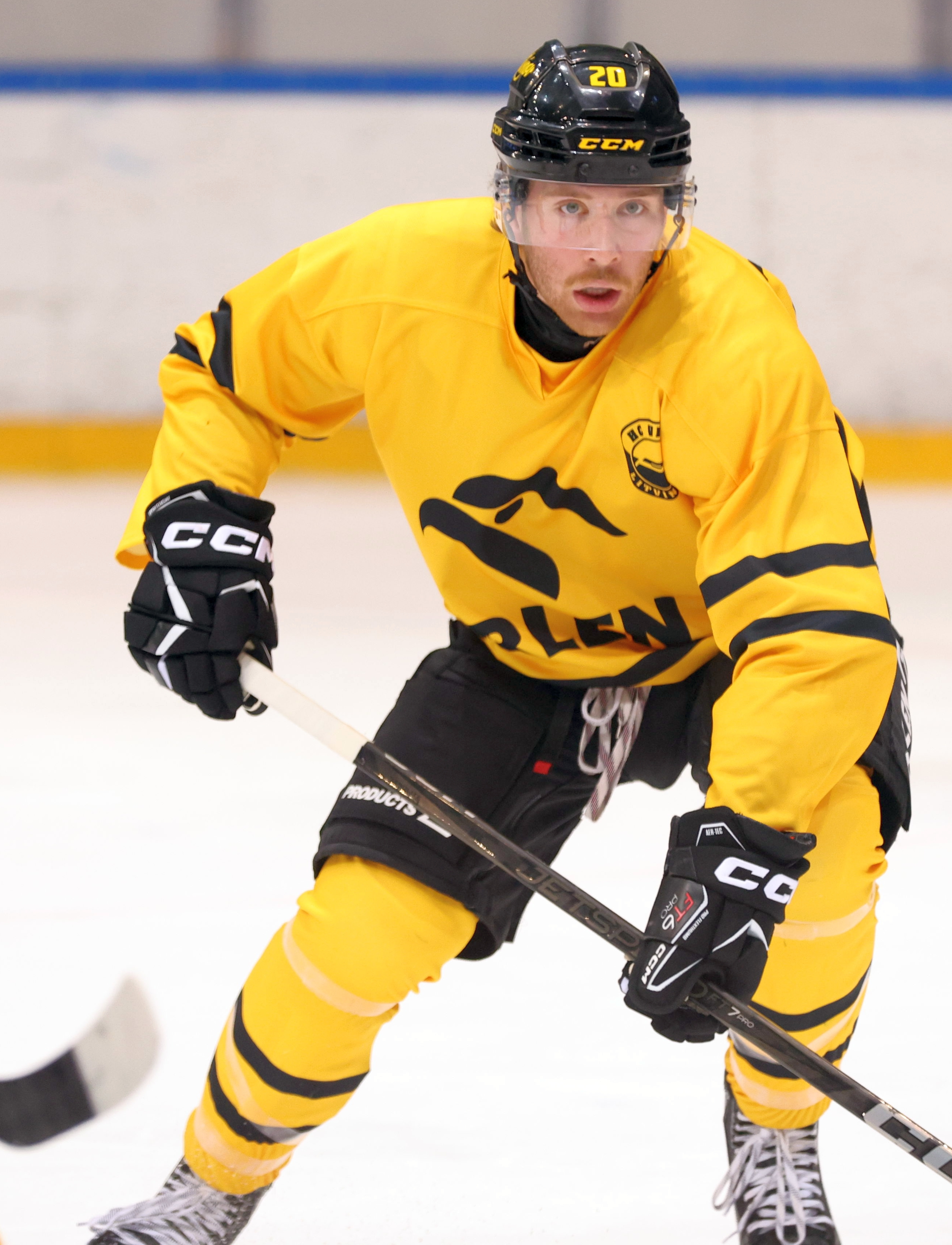
- Jared McIsaac, 2024
- Born: March 27, 2000 (age 26) Truro, Nova Scotia, Canada
- Height: 6 ft 1 in (185 cm)
- Weight: 192 lb (87 kg; 13 st 10 lb)
- Position: Defence
- Shoots: Left
- ELH team Former teams: HC Litvínov; HPK; Grand Rapids Griffins; HC Ambrì-Piotta; Providence Bruins
- NHL draft: 36th overall, 2018; Detroit Red Wings
- Playing career: 2020–present

Jared McIsaac (born March 27, 2000) is a Canadian professional ice hockey defenceman currently playing with HC Litvínov in the Czech Extraliga (ELH). He was selected by the Detroit Red Wings in the second round, 36th overall, of the 2018 NHL entry draft.

== Early life ==
McIsaac was born on March 27, 2000, in Truro, Nova Scotia, to parents Jamie and Sandra. His father is a local ice hockey referee while his uncle Jon is a referee in the NHL. He grew up playing minor hockey in Truro before his family moved to Dartmouth in 2013.

While playing peewee ice hockey in Cole Harbour, McIsaac moved from forward to defense when an opportunity opened on the roster. During his amateur career, McIsaac won a silver medal with Team Canada at the Youth Olympics and competed with Team Nova Scotia at the Gatorade Excellence Challenge. He moved onto major midget before being drafted second overall by his hometown Halifax Mooseheads in the 2016 Quebec Major Junior Hockey League (QMHJL) Draft. In order to draft him, the Moosehead gave Baie-Comeau Drakkar three draft picks so they could have the second selection.

== Playing career ==
=== Major junior ===
During his rookie season with the Mooseheads, McIsaac recorded 32 points in 59 games which set a team record for points by a 16-year-old defenceman. McIsaac recorded 19 points on the power play and maintained a +7 rating throughout the course of the season. As a result of his success, McIsaac won Defensive Rookie of the Year.

Leading up to the 2018 NHL entry draft, McIsaac was praised by scouts for being "a smart player, with a strong positional game and good anticipation.” McIsaac also earned an A rating from NHL Central Scouting Bureau on its preliminary players to watch list for the NHL Draft. McIsaac was also ranked 13th amongst all North American skaters by the NHL Central Scouting Bureau's final ranking. McIsaac was eventually drafted in the second round, 36th overall, by the Detroit Red Wings.

Prior to the start of the 2018–19 QMJHL season, McIsaac signed a three-year entry level contract with the Red Wings. During the season, McIsaac ranked second in scoring among defensemen, and set a new career high, with 62 points in 53 games. However, he suffered a shoulder injury in June and was expected to miss five to six months to recover. This resulted in his missing the Red Wings Development and Training Camp. In January 2020, McIsaac was traded to the Moncton Wildcats in exchange for four draft picks.

=== Professional ===
While the AHL was paused due to COVID-19, McIsaac was loaned to HPK of the Finnish Liiga. After appearing in one game for HPK, McIsaac underwent another shoulder surgery thus ending his season. Upon returning to North America in April 2021, McIsaac played 10 games for the Grand Rapids Griffins where he earned two assists.

Entering his fourth year within the Red Wings organization, McIsaac remained assigned to the Grand Rapids Griffins of the AHL to begin the 2023–24 season. Unable to cement a role within the Griffins, following 15 games with the Griffins and in his final season under contract with the Red Wings, McIsaac left the AHL and was loaned to Swiss club, HC Ambrì-Piotta of the National League (NL) on February 13, 2024.

Following three regular season games and one post-season game in the Swiss League, McIsaac returned to North America and was loaned by the Red Wings to the Providence Bruins, after he was involved in an AHL trade between the Griffins and Bruins in exchange for Curtis Hall on March 15, 2024.

Having concluded his contract with the Red Wings, McIsaac left the club as a free agent and returned to Europe in signing a one-year pact with Czech club, HC Litvínov of the ELH, on August 5, 2024.

== International play ==
Medal record

Representing Canada

Ice hockey

World Junior Championships
Gold medal – first place	2020 Czech Republic	

As a rookie in the QMJHL, McIsaac was named by Hockey Canada to represent Canada White at the 2016 World U-17 Hockey Challenge. He later rejoined his national team to compete at the 2017 IIHF World U18 Championships where he recorded two assists in five games while also seeing time on the power play. The junior team was eventually eliminated by Sweden in the quarter-finals. In August, McIsaac won a gold medal with Team Canada at the 2017 Ivan Hlinka Memorial Tournament. The following year, McIsaac was selected to represent Team Canada at the 2018 IIHF World U18 Championships. During the tournament, McIsaac was suspended one game for a head hit against Czech Republic forward Jachym Kondelik. In spite of this, McIsaac was named one of Canada's Top Three Players for the tournament.

== Playing style ==
Considered a two-way defenseman, McIsaac tries to model his game after Drew Doughty of the Los Angeles Kings. When speaking about his play, he said: "I like to play physically and to contribute offensively and defensively...I'm willing to play any role. I want to contribute as much as possible." He also compared himself to Ryan McDonagh for being a "defense first guy and join the rush after that."

== Career statistics ==
=== Regular season and playoffs ===
			Regular season					Playoffs
Season	Team	League	GP	G	A	Pts	PIM	GP	G	A	Pts	PIM
2016–17	Halifax Mooseheads	QMJHL	59	4	28	32	60	5	0	0	0	2
2017–18	Halifax Mooseheads	QMJHL	65	9	38	47	86	9	0	4	4	8
2018–19	Halifax Mooseheads	QMJHL	53	16	46	62	56	22	2	14	16	38
2019–20	Halifax Mooseheads	QMJHL	3	0	2	2	6	—	—	—	—	—
2019–20	Moncton Wildcats	QMJHL	25	4	13	17	40	—	—	—	—	—
2020–21	HPK	Liiga	1	0	0	0	0	—	—	—	—	—
2020–21	Grand Rapids Griffins	AHL	10	0	2	2	2	—	—	—	—	—
2021–22	Grand Rapids Griffins	AHL	70	5	19	24	34	—	—	—	—	—
2022–23	Grand Rapids Griffins	AHL	61	3	19	22	30	—	—	—	—	—
2023–24	Grand Rapids Griffins	AHL	15	1	3	4	4	—	—	—	—	—
2023–24	HC Ambrì-Piotta	NL	3	0	0	0	0	1	0	0	0	0
2023–24	Providence Bruins	AHL	6	0	1	1	0	4	0	1	1	0
Liiga totals			1	0	0	0	0	—	—	—	—	—

=== International ===
Year	Team	Event	Result	GP	G	A	Pts	PIM
2016	Canada White	U17	4th	6	0	2	2	12
2017	Canada	U18	5th	5	0	2	2	4
2017	Canada	IH18	1st place, gold medalist(s)	5	1	2	3	4
2018	Canada	U18	5th	5	1	2	3	4
2019	Canada	WJC	6th	4	0	1	1	4
2020	Canada	WJC	1st place, gold medalist(s)	7	1	3	4	8
Junior totals				32	3	12	15	36
