= Lukas Wernblom =

Swedish ice hockey player

- Born: 22 July 2000 (age 25) Örnsköldsvik, Sweden
- Height: 5 ft 9 in (175 cm)
- Weight: 172 lb (78 kg; 12 st 4 lb)
- Position: Left wing
- Shoots: Left
- SHL team Former teams: Malmö Redhawks; HV71
- Playing career: 2016–present

Lukas Wernblom (born 22 July 2000) is a Swedish professional ice hockey forward who plays for the Malmö Redhawks of the SHL.

He is the son of former ice hockey player Magnus Wernblom.

== Career statistics ==
=== Regular season and playoffs ===
			Regular season					Playoffs
Season	Team	League	GP	G	A	Pts	PIM	GP	G	A	Pts	PIM
2016–17	Modo Hockey	J20	27	6	11	17	79	6	0	1	1	8
2016–17	Modo Hockey	Allsv	20	3	1	4	16	—	—	—	—	—
2017–18	Modo Hockey	J20	20	5	13	18	46	6	1	4	5	6
2017–18	Modo Hockey	Allsv	22	0	0	0	33	—	—	—	—	—
2017–18	Örnsköldsviks HF	Div.1	5	2	1	3	6	—	—	—	—	—
2018–19	Modo Hockey	J20	—	—	—	—	—	6	3	4	7	6
2018–19	Modo Hockey	Allsv	48	6	11	17	90	5	1	1	2	8
2019–20	Modo Hockey	Allsv	5	0	0	0	6	—	—	—	—	—
2019–20	Västerviks IK	Allsv	46	8	8	16	57	1	2	2	4	2
2020–21	Mora IK	Allsv	49	18	29	47	113	4	2	0	2	6
2020–21	HV71	SHL	3	0	0	0	0	—	—	—	—	—
2021–22	Mora IK	Allsv	50	19	21	40	59	8	2	1	3	2
2022–23	Malmö Redhawks	SHL	44	0	5	5	8	—	—	—	—	—
2022–23	Modo Hockey	Allsv	2	2	0	2	0	—	—	—	—	—
SHL totals			47	0	5	5	8	—	—	—	—	—
