= Barrett Hayton =

Canadian ice hockey player (born 2000)

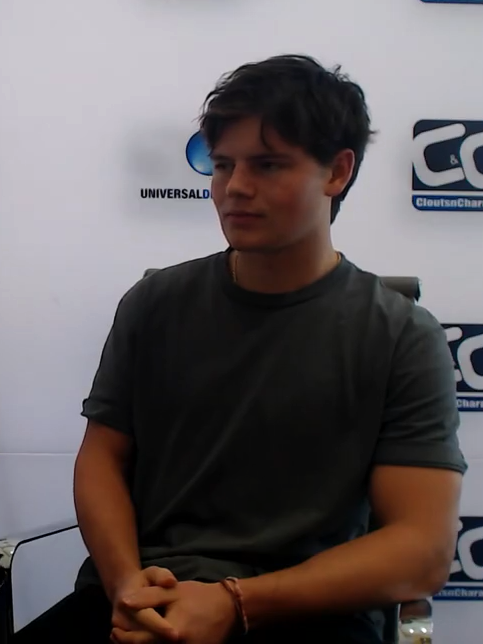
- Hayton in 2019
- Born: June 9, 2000 (age 26) Peterborough, Ontario, Canada
- Height: 6 ft 1 in (185 cm)
- Weight: 200 lb (91 kg; 14 st 4 lb)
- Position: Centre
- Shoots: Left
- NHL team Former teams: Utah Mammoth; Arizona Coyotes; Ilves
- National team: Canada
- NHL draft: 5th overall, 2018; Arizona Coyotes
- Playing career: 2019–present

Barrett Hayton (born June 9, 2000) is a Canadian professional ice hockey player who is a centre for the Utah Mammoth of the National Hockey League (NHL). He was drafted fifth overall by the Arizona Coyotes in the 2018 NHL entry draft.

== Playing career ==
=== Minor and major junior hockey ===
Hayton, as a native of Peterborough, Ontario, first played minor hockey with the Peterborough Petes and then moved to the Toronto Red Wings organization in the Greater Toronto Hockey League. He also played for the Upper Canada College team as a student there from 2015 to 2016. In showing early offensive promise, scoring 73 points in 59 games as a 15-year old with the Red Wings, Hayton was selected ninth overall in the Ontario Hockey League (OHL's) 2016 Priority Selection draft by the Sault Ste. Marie Greyhounds. On June 17, 2016, he agreed to terms with the Greyhounds to begin his major junior career in the 2016–17 season.

In his OHL rookie campaign, Hayton was eased into the lineup and scored a respectable 27 points in 63 games. In the following 2017–18 season, Hayton continued his upwards development in progressing to almost a point-per-game pace with 60 points in 63 games. He was nominated and won the Bobby Smith Trophy as the OHL's Scholastic Player of the Year.

=== Arizona Coyotes ===
With his draft stock rising throughout the season, Hayton was ranked in the top 10 North American skaters to end the season by the NHL Central Scouting Bureau. On June 22, 2018, Hayton's rise up the rankings was realised as he was selected fifth overall by the Arizona Coyotes at the 2018 NHL entry draft. On July 6, Hayton was signed to a three-year, entry-level contract with the Coyotes. Hayton started the 2018–19 season with the Coyotes in the NHL, but after being scratched for the Coyotes' first two games of the season he was reassigned to the Greyhounds. Upon his return to juniors, Hayton was named team captain.

After attending the Coyotes 2019 training camp, he made his NHL debut on October 10, 2019, against the Vegas Golden Knights. Hayton recorded his first NHL point in the game, a secondary assist on Nick Schmaltz's first period goal, as well as his first NHL minor penalty. In his third NHL game, on October 25, 2019, Hayton recorded his first NHL goal. Hayton's goal was the game-winning goal, scored against the New Jersey Devils' goaltender, Mackenzie Blackwood, on an assist from Nick Schmaltz.

On December 12, 2019, the Coyotes announced the loan of Hayton to Canada's under-20 world junior hockey team for the 2020 IIHF World U20 Championship, held in the Czech Republic from December 26 to January 5. On January 8, 2020, following the conclusion of the IIHF World U20 Championship, the Coyotes recalled Hayton. On February 5, 2020, Hayton was sent down to the Coyotes American Hockey League (AHL) affiliate, the Tucson Roadrunners, on a five-game conditioning assignment. Hayton rejoined the Coyotes and played in six more games before the season was cut short due to the COVID-19 pandemic. Hayton travelled with the team to Edmonton for the play-in series against the Nashville Predators. Hayton appeared in two of those games, but did not register a point. In the following playoff series against the Colorado Avalanche, Hayton appeared in one game before the Coyotes were eliminated from post-season play.

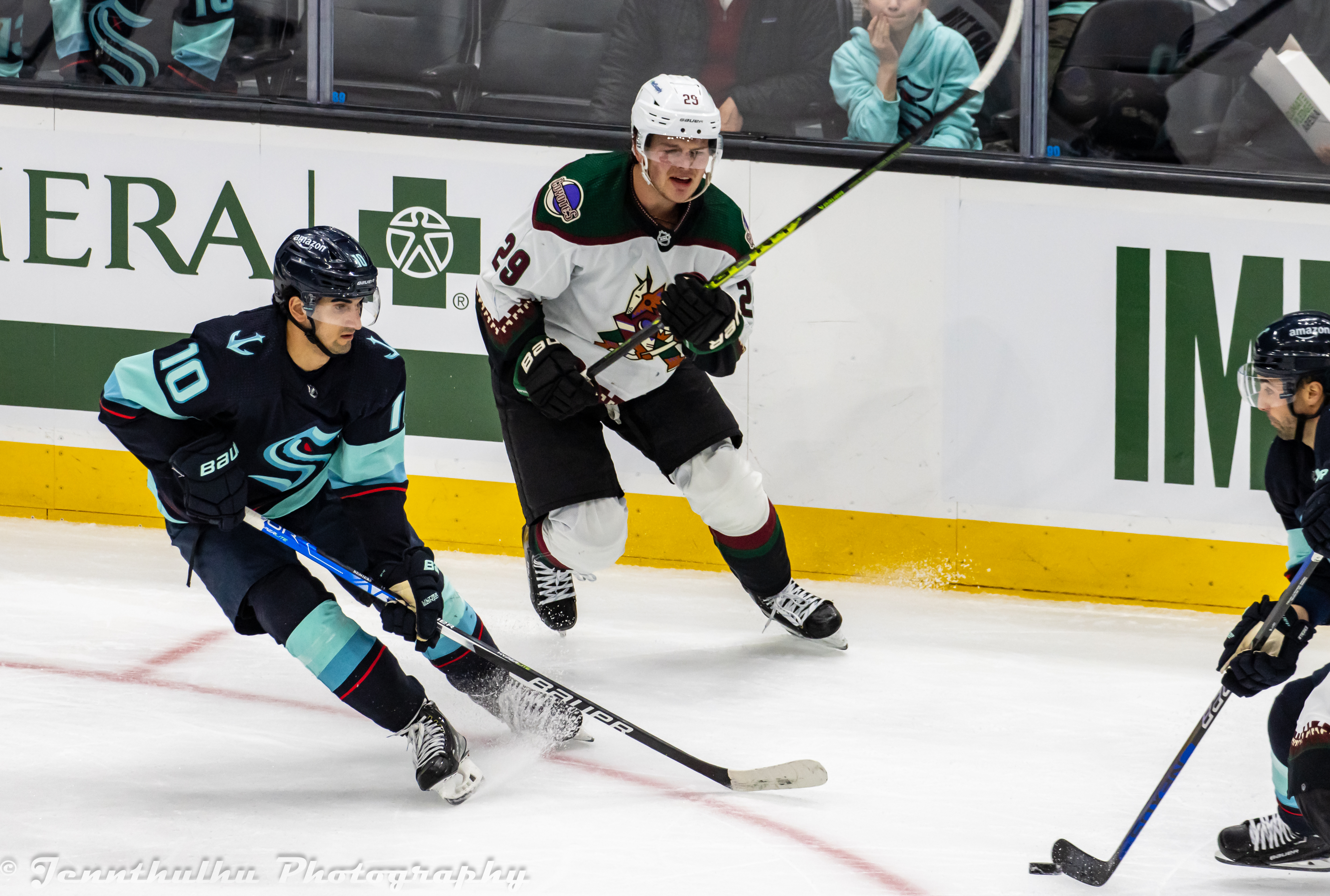
Hayton in action against the Seattle Kraken in 2023

On October 18, 2020, Hayton was loaned by the Coyotes to Finnish Liiga club, Ilves, until the start of NHL training camp. He made eight appearances in the 2020–21 season, registering four assists for Ilves, before returning to the Coyotes. Hatyon began the 2020–21 season with the Coyotes. Through to February 22, 2021, he played in 14 games, recording 2 goals and a single assist. On February 22, the Coyotes assigned him to the AHL to play with the Tucson Roadrunners.

Hatyon began the 2021–22 season with the Roadrunners. On October 26, 2021, the Coyotes recalled Hayton from Tucson. Hayton made his 2021–22 NHL season debut on October 28, 2021, and registered a point. Hayton underwent wrist surgery in early January 2022. Hayton was out of the Coyote line-up for 16 games and returned on February 20, 2022. At the conclusion of the 2021–22 season, Hayton became a restricted free agent. The Coyotes extended a qualifying offer to Hayton on July 11, whereby the Coyotes retained negotiating rights with Hayton. On September 20, 2022, Hayton signed a two-year, $3.55 million contract with the Coyotes.

Hayton played in all 82 of the Coyotes' regular season games during the 2022–23 season. He recorded careers highs in goals (19), assists (24), points (43) and penalty minutes (42) and played on the first line with Clayton Keller and Nick Schmaltz. Hayton missed nearly three months of the 2023–24 season with an upper-body injury. He was injured in a game against the Columbus Blue Jackets on November 16, 2023. Initially expected to miss four to six weeks, Hayton suffered a setback in his recovery that resulted in him being sidelined until the All-Star break. He then sustained a lower-body injury in mid-March and it ended up bringing his season to an early close. He was limited to 10 points through 33 contests in an injury-riddled campaign.

=== Utah Mammoth ===
Shortly after the end of the 2023–24 regular season, the Coyotes' franchise was suspended and team assets were subsequently transferred to the expansion team Utah Hockey Club; as a result, Hayton became a member of the Utah team. A restricted free agent at season's end, he signed a two-year contract with Utah on July 8, 2024. The franchise officially named themselves the Utah Mammoth beginning the following season.

Entering the 2026 off-season as a restricted free agent, the New Jersey Devils submitted an offer sheet for Hayton, offering a one-year, $4.775 million contract on July 1. The Mammoth matched the offer sheet on July 8, keeping him in Utah.

== International play ==
Medal record

Men's ice hockey

Representing Canada

World Junior Championships
| Gold medal – first place | 2020 Czech Republic | |

Ivan Hlinka Memorial Tournament
| Gold medal – first place | 2017 Czech Republic/Slovakia | |

Hayton played for Canada junior team in the 2017 Ivan Hlinka Memorial Tournament where he led the team in goals scored. Hayton then played for Canada at the 2019 World Junior Championships in which Canada finished in sixth place.

Hayton was named captain of Canada's team that played in the 2020 World Junior Championships. In Canada's round robin 6–0 loss to Russia, Hayton did not remove his helmet during the playing of the national anthem of Russia. Removing one's helmet while an anthem is playing is customary in the IIHF event. He suffered an injury in the semifinals against Finland but stayed in Canada's lineup for the gold medal game. In the final against Russia, Hayton tied the game in the third-period to lead Canada to a gold medal. Hayton was named to tournament's Media All-Star team.

== Personal life ==
Hayton's father, Brian, was a defenceman for the Guelph Platers from 1985 to 1988 and the Peterborough Petes from 1988 to 1989. After a six-game professional stint in the AHL, he then coached the Kitchener Rangers of the OHL before settling into a teaching job at a Norwood District High School, just outside of Peterborough.

== Career statistics ==
=== Regular season and playoffs ===
| | | | Regular season | | | | | Playoffs |
| Season | Team | League | GP | G | A | Pts | PIM | GP | G | A | Pts | PIM |
|---|---|---|---|---|---|---|---|---|---|---|---|---|
| 2015–16 | Toronto Red Wings | GTMMHL | 59 | 36 | 37 | 73 | — | — | — | — | — | — |
| 2016–17 | Sault Ste. Marie Greyhounds | OHL | 63 | 9 | 18 | 27 | 36 | 9 | 2 | 0 | 2 | 4 |
| 2017–18 | Sault Ste. Marie Greyhounds | OHL | 63 | 21 | 39 | 60 | 32 | 24 | 8 | 13 | 21 | 16 |
| 2018–19 | Sault Ste. Marie Greyhounds | OHL | 39 | 26 | 40 | 66 | 42 | 11 | 6 | 10 | 16 | 16 |
| 2019–20 | Arizona Coyotes | NHL | 20 | 1 | 3 | 4 | 14 | 3 | 0 | 0 | 0 | 0 |
| 2019–20 | Tucson Roadrunners | AHL | 5 | 1 | 4 | 5 | 4 | — | — | — | — | — |
| 2020–21 | Ilves | Liiga | 8 | 0 | 4 | 4 | 8 | — | — | — | — | — |
| 2020–21 | Arizona Coyotes | NHL | 14 | 2 | 1 | 3 | 0 | — | — | — | — | — |
| 2020–21 | Tucson Roadrunners | AHL | 26 | 6 | 4 | 10 | 18 | 1 | 0 | 0 | 0 | 0 |
| 2021–22 | Tucson Roadrunners | AHL | 4 | 0 | 1 | 1 | 6 | — | — | — | — | — |
| 2021–22 | Arizona Coyotes | NHL | 60 | 10 | 14 | 24 | 20 | — | — | — | — | — |
| 2022–23 | Arizona Coyotes | NHL | 82 | 19 | 24 | 43 | 42 | — | — | — | — | — |
| 2023–24 | Arizona Coyotes | NHL | 33 | 3 | 7 | 10 | 26 | — | — | — | — | — |
| 2024–25 | Utah Hockey Club | NHL | 82 | 20 | 26 | 46 | 45 | — | — | — | — | — |
| 2025–26 | Utah Mammoth | NHL | 67 | 10 | 15 | 25 | 54 | 1 | 0 | 0 | 0 | 0 |
| NHL totals | | | 358 | 65 | 90 | 155 | 201 | 4 | 0 | 0 | 0 | 0 |

=== International ===
| Year | Team | Event | Result | GP | G | A | Pts | PIM |
|---|---|---|---|---|---|---|---|---|
| 2016 | Canada White | U17 | 4th | 6 | 1 | 1 | 2 | 2 |
| 2017 | Canada | IH18 | 1st place, gold medalist(s) | 5 | 3 | 3 | 6 | 2 |
| 2019 | Canada | WJC | 6th | 5 | 0 | 4 | 4 | 0 |
| 2020 | Canada | WJC | 1st place, gold medalist(s) | 7 | 6 | 6 | 12 | 6 |
| 2025 | Canada | WC | 5th | 6 | 1 | 1 | 2 | 4 |
| Junior totals | | | | 23 | 10 | 14 | 24 | 10 |
| Senior totals | | | | 6 | 1 | 1 | 2 | 4 |

== Awards and honours ==
| Award | Year | Ref |
OHL
| Bobby Smith Trophy | 2018 | |

Awards and achievements
| Preceded by Pierre-Olivier Joseph | Arizona Coyotes first-round draft pick 2018 | Succeeded by Victor Söderström |
