= Dax =

Dax or DAX may refer to:

== Business ==
- DAX, stock market index of the top 40 German companies
- DAX (store), a beauty and variety store based in Tijuana, Mexico
- Daxbot, American robotics company
- Dax Cars, British sports car manufacturer
- Honda Dax, a motorcycle model

== People ==
=== Given name ===
- Dax Cowart (1947–2019), American attorney
- Dax Dellenbach (born 1990), American football player
- Dax Fulton (born 2001), American baseball player
- Dax Griffin (born 1972), American actor
- Dax Harwood (born 1984), American professional wrestler
- Dax Holdren (born 1972), American beach volleyball player
- Dax McCarty (born 1987), American soccer player
- Dax Milne (born 1999), American football player
- Dax O'Callaghan (born 1986), English singer, dancer and actor
- Dax Reynosa (born 1969/1970), American hip hop artist and producer and smooth jazz musician
- Dax Phelan (born 1975), American screenwriter, producer, and director
- Dax Pierson (born 1970), American musician
- Dax Riggs (born 1973), American musician, lyricist, and vocalist for the Louisiana metal band Acid Bath
- Dax Shepard (born 1975), American actor

=== Nickname ===
- Dax, nickname for Davide Cesare (1977–2003), Italian antifascist activist
- Mr. DAX, nickname for Dirk Müller, German stock trader

=== Stage name ===
- Dax (rapper) (born 1994), stage name of Canadian rapper Daniel Nwosu Jr.
- Dax Flame (born 1991), stage name of American actor and YouTuber Theodore Madison Patrello
- Dax ExclamationPoint, American drag queen

=== Surname ===
- Elsa Dax (born 1972), French visual artist
- Eric Cunningham Dax (1908–2008), Australian psychiatrist
- Danielle Dax (born 1958), British musician
- Guiraude de Dax (c. 1100–c. 1130), Gascon heiress
- Marc Dax (1770–1837), French neurologist

== Fictional characters ==
- Dax (Power Rangers), in Power Rangers Operation Overdrive
- Ezri Dax, in the television series Star Trek: Deep Space Nine
- Jadzia Dax, in Star Trek: Deep Space Nine
  - "Dax" (Star Trek: Deep Space Nine episode)
- Dax Xenos, in the Harold Robbins novel The Adventurers, later adapted into a film also titled The Adventurers
- Colonel Dax, in the film Paths of Glory
- Dax, on the television series The Philanthropist
- Dax, one of Haviland Tuf's cats in the series Tuf Voyaging, first seen in "Guardians"

== Places ==
- Arrondissement of Dax, an arrondissement of the Landes département of France
  - Canton of Dax-1, or Canton de Dax Nord, a subdivision of the arrondissement
  - Canton of Dax-2, or Canton de Dax Sud, a subdivision of the arrondissement
- Dax, Landes, a town in France
  - Dax Cathedral, a cathedral in the town

== Science and technology ==
- DAX or Data analysis expressions, a query language used by Microsoft software products
- DAX (application), a film and television production workflow application
- Microsoft Dynamics AX, an enterprise resource planning software

== Other uses ==
- Dax (typeface), a sans-serif typeface designed by Hans Reichel
- Detroit Air Xpress, a public transit service in Metro Detroit
- DAX, IATA code for Dazhou Heshi Airport, China

== See also ==
- US Dax, a rugby union club based in France
- DAX1, a protein involved in sex determination
- DACS (disambiguation)
- Daxophone, a musical instrument invented by Hans Reichel
