= Albin Grewe =

Swedish ice hockey player (born 2001)

- Born: 22 March 2001 (age 25) Märsta, Sweden
- Height: 5 ft 11 in (180 cm)
- Weight: 190 lb (86 kg; 13 st 8 lb)
- Position: Right wing
- Shoots: Left
- SHL team Former teams: Djurgårdens IF; Grand Rapids Griffins; Ilves; Mora IK
- NHL draft: 66th overall, 2019; Detroit Red Wings
- Playing career: 2018–present

Albin Grewe (born 22 March 2001) is a Swedish professional ice hockey player who is a right winger for Djurgårdens IF of the Swedish Hockey League (SHL). He was selected 66th overall by the Detroit Red Wings in the 2019 NHL entry draft.

== Playing career ==
Grewe began his youth and professional career playing for Djurgårdens IF of the Swedish Hockey League (SHL).

Following his selection in the 2019 NHL entry draft by the Red Wings, Grewe remained in Sweden for his second season in the SHL with Djurgården in 2019–20, posting 1 goal in 19 games.

With the intention to further develop his game to the North American style, Grewe nominated and was selected in the second round, 112th overall, by the Saginaw Spirit of the OHL in the 2020 CHL Import Draft. He was signed to a contract to begin his major junior career with the Spirit on 13 July 2020. With the postponement of the OHL season due to the COVID-19 pandemic, Grewe remained in Sweden to continue his tenure with Djurgården.

In the 2020–21 season, Grewe recorded 3 goals and 6 points through 39 regular season games before leaving the club and signing an amateur tryout contract with the Red Wings' AHL affiliate, the Grand Rapids Griffins, on 23 March 2021. Grewe made 11 appearances with the Rapids, collecting 2 assists.

On 18 May 2021, Grewe was signed by Finnish club, Ilves Tampere of the Liiga, to an optional two-year contract.

== Career statistics ==
=== Regular season and playoffs ===
			Regular season					Playoffs
Season	Team	League	GP	G	A	Pts	PIM	GP	G	A	Pts	PIM
2017–18	Djurgårdens IF	J20	36	10	17	27	54	3	0	1	1	8
2018–19	Djurgårdens IF	J20	25	13	21	34	102	8	2	4	6	2
2018–19	Djurgårdens IF	SHL	15	0	0	0	16	1	0	0	0	0
2019–20	Djurgårdens IF	J20	23	6	13	19	111	—	—	—	—	—
2019–20	Djurgårdens IF	SHL	19	1	0	1	6	—	—	—	—	—
2020–21	Djurgårdens IF	SHL	39	3	3	6	29	—	—	—	—	—
2020–21	Grand Rapids Griffins	AHL	11	0	2	2	6	—	—	—	—	—
2021–22	Ilves	Liiga	4	0	0	0	2	—	—	—	—	—
2021–22	Mora IK	Allsv	32	4	13	17	40	8	0	5	5	6
2022–23	Mora IK	Allsv	41	3	8	11	26	5	0	0	0	6
2023–24	Djurgårdens IF	Allsv	33	4	5	9	91	12	0	6	6	6
2024–25	Djurgårdens IF	Allsv	45	4	9	13	28	16	5	2	7	13
SHL totals			73	4	3	7	51	1	0	0	0	0

Medal record

Representing Sweden

Ice hockey

World U18 Championships
Gold medal – first place	2019 Sweden	
Bronze medal – third place	2018 Russia	

=== International ===
Year	Team	Event	Result	GP	G	A	Pts	PIM
2017	Sweden	U17	8th	5	0	2	2	10
2018	Sweden	U18	3rd place, bronze medalist(s)	7	0	0	0	8
2018	Sweden	HG18	2nd place, silver medalist(s)	3	1	1	2	12
2019	Sweden	U18	1st place, gold medalist(s)	7	2	0	2	10
Junior totals				22	3	3	6	40
