= Dach (disambiguation) =

Dach is an abbreviation for the organic compound trans-1,2-Diaminocyclohexane.

Dach or DACH may also refer to:

- DACH, an acronym for Deutschland (Germany), Austria, Confoederatio Helvetica (Swiss Confederation), the three major German-speaking countries
- Dach (surname)
- DACH ligand or Trost ligand, derived from trans-1,2-Diaminocyclohexane
- 1,2-Cyclohexanediamine DACH Di Amino Cyclo Hexane
- DACH1 or Dachshund homolog 1, a protein encoded by the human DACH1 gene

== See also ==
- Dachs (disambiguation)
