= Alexander Holtz =

Swedish ice hockey player (born 2002)

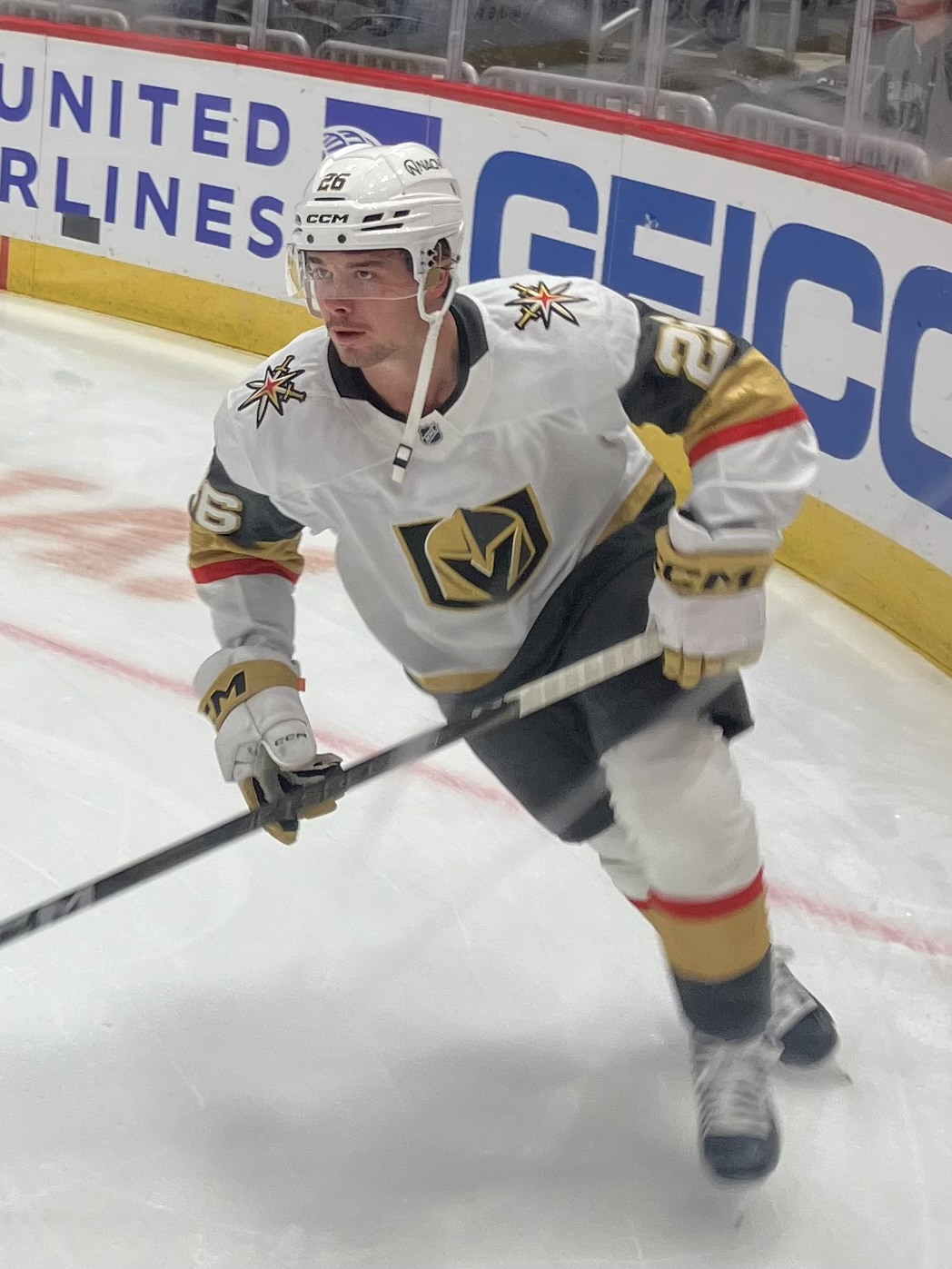
- Holtz with the Vegas Golden Knights in 2024
- Born: 23 January 2002 (age 24) Stockholm, Sweden
- Height: 6 ft 0 in (183 cm)
- Weight: 183 lb (83 kg; 13 st 1 lb)
- Position: Forward
- Shoots: Right
- NHL team Former teams: Vegas Golden Knights; Djurgårdens IF; New Jersey Devils
- NHL draft: 7th overall, 2020; New Jersey Devils
- Playing career: 2019–present

Alexander Gabriel Holtz (born 23 January 2002) is a Swedish professional ice hockey player who is a forward for the Vegas Golden Knights of the National Hockey League (NHL). He was selected seventh overall by the New Jersey Devils in the 2020 NHL entry draft.

== Early life ==
Holtz was born on 23 January 2002 in Stockholm. His father, Magnus Holtz (born Andersson), is a former ice hockey player who played two seasons for Västerviks IK. He also has an older brother, David. As a youngster, Holtz played several sports such as football, tennis, golf, and basketball, but eventually chose to bet on hockey.

He started his hockey career in Boo IF at a young age and has since childhood followed his big brother who also played hockey. His father was the coach of Nacka HK at this time. Holtz already made his debut as a 13-year-old in a junior context when he played in U16 with Nacka/Farsta FoC and their U16 division 1 team during the 2014–15 season. Then there were two more seasons with the U16 team in Nacka where he performed so well that he was promoted to their J18 Elit team in the 2016–17 season. During those years, he averaged almost two points per game - even though he was two years younger than most he played against.

He was named for the Stockholm South team in the national junior hockey tournament TV-pucken in 2017 and scored 6 goals and 10 points in 6 games. Holtz was awarded the Sven Tumba award as the best forward of the tournament.

== Playing career ==
=== Djurgårdens IF ===
Holtz moved to Djurgårdens IF for the 2017–18 season to play in the club's junior teams. Holtz made his professional debut in the Swedish Hockey League on 29 January 2019, in a home game against Färjestad BK. At the conclusion of the J20 SuperElit regular season, Holtz was the leading goal scorer with 30 goals in 38 games. The J20 playoffs ended with a third place for Holtz and Djurgården.

Holtz began the 2019–20 season by playing with Djurgårdens IF in the 2019–20 Champions Hockey League, a European ice hockey tournament. In the first game against Polish GKS Tychy, Holtz scored two goals. He recorded his first SHL point in the league premiere on 14 September when assisting Michael Haga to the 1–1 equalizer in the 4–2 win against Linköping HC. In the next game on 17 September, Holtz scored his first and second SHL goal against goaltender Viktor Fasth of Växjö Lakers in a 5–3 win. Holtz extended his contract with Djurgårdens IF on 23 September by two years, allowing him to play with the club until the 2021–22 SHL season.

In his first full season in the SHL in the 2020–21 campaign, Holtz appeared in a career-high 40 regular season games with Djurgårdens IF collecting seven goals and 11 assists to set new career mark of 18 points. After co-leading the club in postseason scoring with four points in three games, Holtz signed a three-year, entry-level contract with the New Jersey Devils on 19 April 2021, as well as an amateur tryout (ATO) contract with their American Hockey League (AHL) affiliate, the Binghamton Devils.

=== New Jersey Devils ===
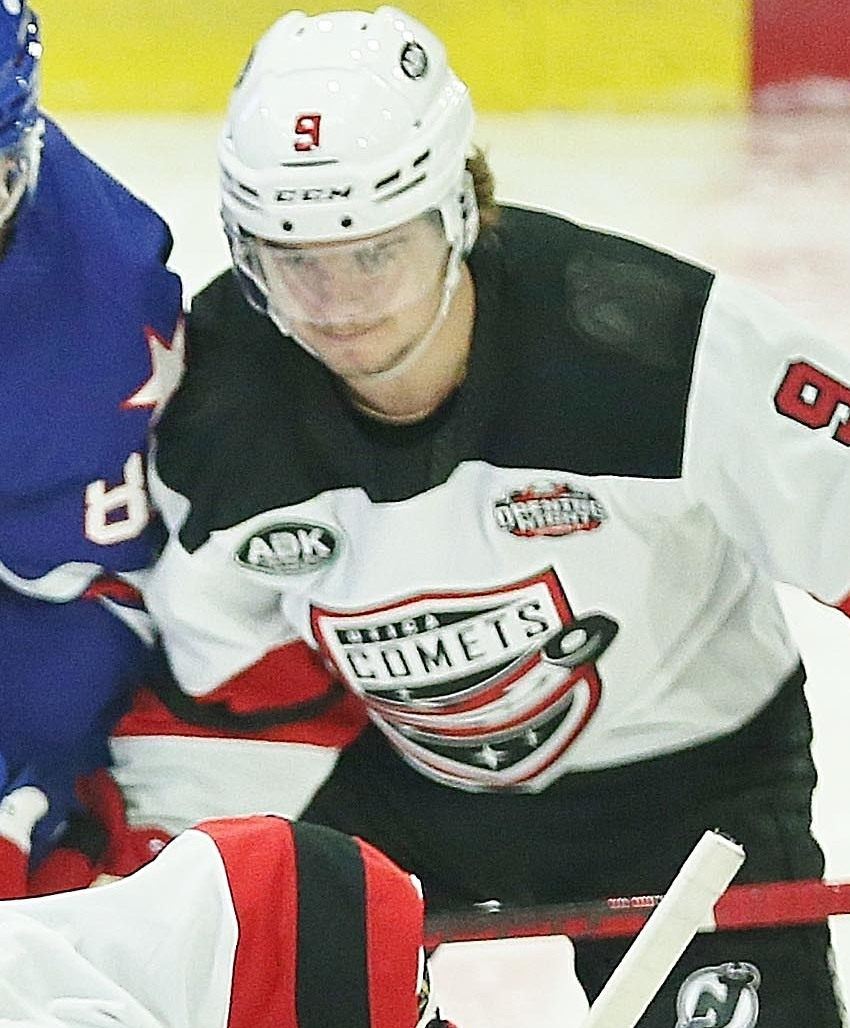
Holtz with the Utica Comets in 2021.

Holtz moved to North America permanently for the 2021–22 season. Following the conclusion of the NHL pre-season, Holtz was assigned to the AHL's Utica Comets, where he finished among the top rookie scorers, recording 26 goals and 51 points in 52 games. In one of a few brief stints with the Devils, Holtz scored his first NHL point, an assist on a goal by Pavel Zacha against the Florida Panthers on 9 November 2021.

Holtz made the Devils' NHL roster for the 2022–23 season but failed to retain a permanent roster spot, playing only 19 games with the Devils and 14 with the Comets. He scored his first NHL goal, the Devils' first goal of the season, on 13 October 2022 against the Philadelphia Flyers. His first multi-point NHL game came on 4 January 2023, scoring a goal and an assist against the Detroit Red Wings in his 25th NHL game.

=== Vegas Golden Knights ===
On 29 June 2024, during the 2024 NHL entry draft, Holtz and Akira Schmid were traded to the Vegas Golden Knights in exchange for Paul Cotter and a third-round pick in 2025. Holtz scored his first goal with Vegas on October 22, 2024, contributing the Golden Knights' fourth goal in a 6–1 victory over the Los Angeles Kings.

As a restricted free agent following the 2024–25 season, Holtz was unable to agree to a new deal with Vegas prior to the start of their 2025–26 training camp. He signed a professional tryout agreement with the team on September 18, 2025, in order to allow him to attend camp while negotiations on a full contract continued. He and the Golden Knights came to terms on a two-year contract with an average annual value of $837,500 on October 7.

== Career statistics ==
=== Regular season and playoffs ===
			Regular season					Playoffs
Season	Team	League	GP	G	A	Pts	PIM	GP	G	A	Pts	PIM
2017–18	Djurgårdens IF	J20	11	4	4	8	2	—	—	—	—	—
2018–19	Djurgårdens IF	J20	38	30	17	47	12	5	2	2	4	2
2018–19	Djurgårdens IF	SHL	3	0	0	0	0	—	—	—	—	—
2019–20	Djurgårdens IF	J20	3	7	2	9	2	—	—	—	—	—
2019–20	Djurgårdens IF	SHL	35	9	7	16	12	—	—	—	—	—
2020–21	Djurgårdens IF	SHL	40	7	11	18	4	3	2	2	4	2
2020–21	Binghamton Devils	AHL	10	1	2	3	0	—	—	—	—	—
2021–22	Utica Comets	AHL	52	26	25	51	10	5	1	2	3	0
2021–22	New Jersey Devils	NHL	9	0	2	2	2	—	—	—	—	—
2022–23	New Jersey Devils	NHL	19	3	1	4	8	—	—	—	—	—
2022–23	Utica Comets	AHL	14	6	5	11	4	6	0	5	5	0
2023–24	New Jersey Devils	NHL	82	16	12	28	14	—	—	—	—	—
2024–25	Vegas Golden Knights	NHL	53	4	8	12	10	—	—	—	—	—
2024–25	Henderson Silver Knights	AHL	16	7	6	13	2	—	—	—	—	—
2025–26	Vegas Golden Knights	NHL	28	3	6	9	10	—	—	—	—	—
2025–26	Henderson Silver Knights	AHL	13	2	7	9	2	6	1	0	1	0
SHL totals			78	16	18	34	16	3	2	2	4	2
NHL totals			191	26	29	55	44	—	—	—	—	—

=== International ===
Medal record

Representing Sweden

Men's ice hockey

World Junior Championships
Bronze medal – third place	2020 Czech Republic	

World U18 Championships
Gold medal – first place	2019 Sweden	

Hlinka Gretzky Cup
Silver medal – second place	2018 Edmonton/Red Deer	

World U-17 Hockey Challenge
Bronze medal – third place	2017 Dawson Creek/Fort St. John	

Year	Team	Event	Result	GP	G	A	Pts	PIM
2018	Sweden	HG18	2nd place, silver medalist(s)	5	2	5	7	0
2018	Sweden	U17	3rd place, bronze medalist(s)	6	4	4	8	4
2019	Sweden	U18	1st place, gold medalist(s)	7	4	3	7	4
2020	Sweden	WJC	3rd place, bronze medalist(s)	7	3	2	5	2
2021	Sweden	WJC	5th	5	1	2	3	6
Junior totals				30	14	16	30	16

Awards and achievements
Preceded by Jack Hughes	New Jersey Devils first-round draft pick 2020	Succeeded by Dawson Mercer
