= Dachs =

Dachs may refer to:

- Badger (animal) (Melinae) or European badger (Meles meles), in German
- Dachs armored engineering vehicle, based on the German Leopard 1 tank
- Gabi Dachs, cancer researcher in New Zealand
- Josef Dachs (1825–1896), Austrian pianist and music teacher
- Shloime Dachs, American Hebrew language singer

== See also ==
- Badger (disambiguation)
- Dach (surname)
- Dachshund (German: badger dog)
- Dax (disambiguation)
