= Ryan Suzuki =

Canadian ice hockey player (born 2001)

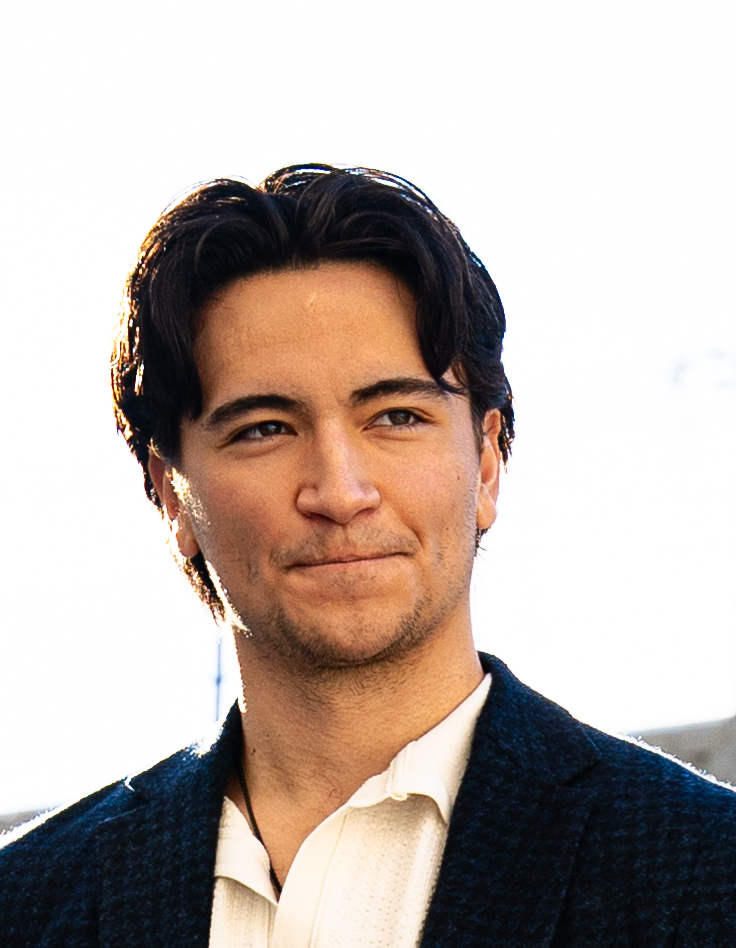
- Suzuki in 2025
- Born: May 28, 2001 (age 25) London, Ontario, Canada
- Height: 6 ft 1 in (185 cm)
- Weight: 185 lb (84 kg; 13 st 3 lb)
- Position: Centre
- Shoots: Left
- NHL team (P) Cur. team Former teams: Ottawa Senators; Belleville Senators (AHL); Carolina Hurricanes
- NHL draft: 28th overall, 2019; Carolina Hurricanes
- Playing career: 2021–present

Ryan Suzuki (born May 28, 2001) is a Canadian professional ice hockey player who is a centre for the Belleville Senators of the American Hockey League (AHL) while under contract to the Ottawa Senators of the National Hockey League (NHL). He was selected 28th overall by the Carolina Hurricanes in the first round of the 2019 NHL entry draft. He is the younger brother of Montreal Canadiens centre and team captain Nick Suzuki.

== Playing career ==
=== Amateur ===
Suzuki was selected by the Barrie Colts of the Ontario Hockey League (OHL) as the first overall selection in the 2017 OHL Priority Selection. He made his debut in the 2017–18 season and in 64 games Suzuki recorded 14 goals and 30 assists for 44 points. Barrie finished second in the Eastern Conference and made the playoffs. They advanced to the conference semifinals, losing to the Kingston Frontenacs. In 12 playoff games, Suzuki scored a goal and four points. Suzuki was named to the OHL Second All-Rookie Team for the 2017–18 season. In his second season with the Colts in 2018–19, Suzuki was named an alternate captain of the team. He finished the year as the scoring leader of the Colts with 25 goals and 75 points in 65 games. The rebuilding Colts failed to qualify for the postseason during the 2018–19 season. He returned to Barrie for the 2019–20 season and made 21 appearances with the Colts, recording five goals and 23 points. However, he missed more than a month of the season after being struck in the eye by a stick on November 1, 2019. At the OHL trade deadline, Suzuki was flipped to the Saginaw Spirit for a package of draft picks and players. He played in 23 games with Saginaw, recording 13 goals and 35 points. However, the season was cancelled on March 18, 2020, due to the COVID-19 pandemic.

=== Professional ===
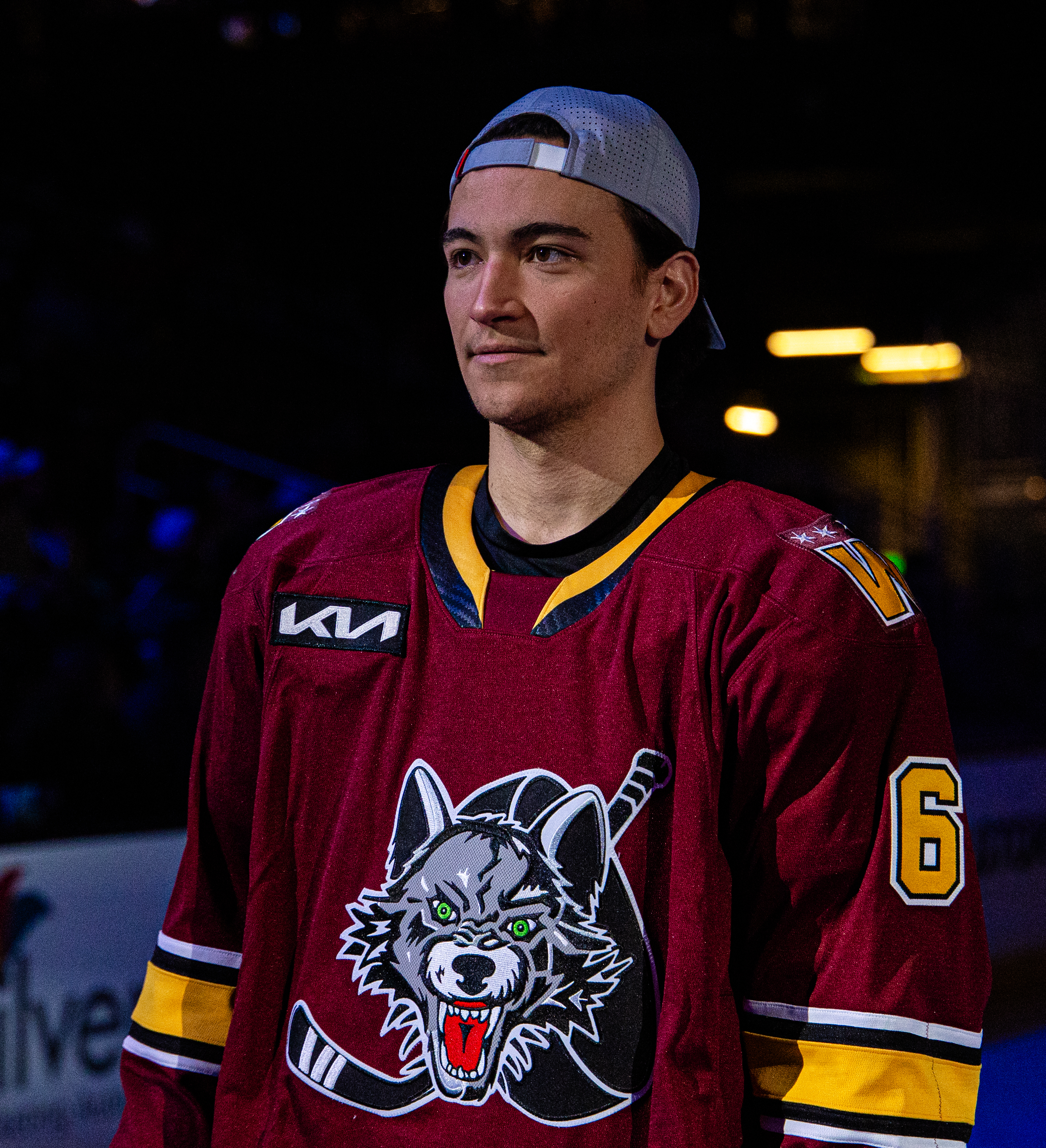
Suzuki at the 2025 AHL All-Star Classic

Suzuki was drafted by the Carolina Hurricanes of the National Hockey League (NHL) in the first round, 28th overall, at the 2019 NHL entry draft. He signed a three-year, entry-level contract with the Hurricanes on September 18, 2019. He joined Carolina's American Hockey League (AHL) affiliate, the Chicago Wolves, for the pandemic-shortened 2020–21 season. In his AHL rookie season, he tallied 5 goals and 10 points in 26 games. However, the 2021 AHL Calder Cup playoffs were cancelled by the league. He returned to Chicago for the 2021–22 season. He missed time between October 29, 2021, and January 28, 2022. In 34 regular season games, he scored seven goals and 14 points. He won the Calder Cup with Wolves in 2022.

Suzuki began the 2022–23 season on Carolina's non-roster injury list. After coming back from injury, he was assigned to Chicago on November 10, 2022. In 50 games with Chicago, he scored 13 goals and 32 points. In October 2023, Suzuki suffered a shoulder injury and was placed on the injured list by the Carolina Hurricanes. He returned from injury in November and was assigned to Carolina's new AHL affiliate, the Springfield Thunderbirds. He spent the remainder of the 2023–24 season in the AHL, scoring 14 goals and 30 points. He was recalled by the Hurricanes during their playoff run, but did not see game time.

In the off-season, Suzuki re-signed with Carolina to a one-year, two-way contract. During the Hurricanes' 2024 training camp, Suzuki was placed on waivers and having gone unclaimed, was assigned to Carolina's returning AHL affiliate, the Chicago Wolves, for the 2024–25 season. He was later selected to play in the 2025 AHL All-Star Classic alongside his teammate, Scott Morrow. Suzuki was called up by the Hurricanes and made his NHL debut on January 30, 2025, in a game against the Chicago Blackhawks. He became the final first-round draft pick in the 2019 NHL entry draft to make his NHL debut. On February 2, he was sent back down to the AHL after appearing in two games with the Hurricanes, going scoreless. He finished the season in the AHL, recording 12 goals and 59 points in 69 games. The team qualified for the 2025 Calder Cup playoffs for the first time since 2022. However, the Wolves were eliminated in the first round by the Rockford IceHogs. In two playoff games, Suzuki tallied one assist. Suzuki signed another one-year, two-way contract with Carolina on July 21, 2025. He cleared waivers and was assigned to Chicago for the 2025–26 season. In 66 games in the AHL, he marked 13 goals and 48 points. The Wolves made the 2026 Calder Cup playoffs and advanced to the championship final against the Toronto Marlies. However, the Marlies defeated the Wolves in five games. In 21 playoff games, Suzuki added five goals and 18 points.

After six seasons within the Hurricanes organization, Suzuki left as an unrestricted free agent and was signed to a one-year, two-way contract by the Ottawa Senators on July 1, 2026. He was placed on waivers by the Senators at the end of training camp and after going unclaimed, was assigned to Ottawa's AHL affiliate, the Belleville Senators, to start the 2026–27 season.

== International play ==
Medal record

Nen's Ice hockey

Representing Canada

World Junior Championships
Silver medal – second place	2021 Canada	

Hlinka Gretzky Cup
Gold medal – first place	2018 Canada	

Suzuki was chosen to play for Canada at the 2018 Hlinka Gretzky Cup. He came in second on team scoring with one goal and eight points as the team won gold at the tournament. He was selected to play for Canada junior team at the 2021 World Junior Championships. The team earned the silver medal after losing to the United States in the final.

== Personal life ==
Suzuki is the brother of fellow ice hockey player Nick Suzuki, the captain of the Montreal Canadiens. He has a permanent blind spot in his right eye, suffered when he was struck by a stick while with the Barrie Colts.

== Career statistics ==
=== Regular season and playoffs ===
			Regular season					Playoffs
Season	Team	League	GP	G	A	Pts	PIM	GP	G	A	Pts	PIM
2016–17	London Nationals	GOJHL	1	2	0	2	0	6	1	2	3	0
2017–18	Barrie Colts	OHL	64	14	30	44	10	12	1	3	4	2
2018–19	Barrie Colts	OHL	65	25	50	75	14	—	—	—	—	—
2019–20	Barrie Colts	OHL	21	5	18	23	16	—	—	—	—	—
2019–20	Saginaw Spirit	OHL	23	13	22	35	8	—	—	—	—	—
2020–21	Chicago Wolves	AHL	26	5	5	10	2	—	—	—	—	—
2021–22	Chicago Wolves	AHL	34	7	7	14	20	—	—	—	—	—
2022–23	Chicago Wolves	AHL	50	13	19	32	18	—	—	—	—	—
2023–24	Springfield Thunderbirds	AHL	51	14	16	30	14	—	—	—	—	—
2024–25	Chicago Wolves	AHL	69	12	47	59	28	2	0	1	1	10
2024–25	Carolina Hurricanes	NHL	2	0	0	0	0	—	—	—	—	—
2025–26	Chicago Wolves	AHL	66	13	35	48	30	21	5	13	18	20
NHL totals			2	0	0	0	0	—	—	—	—	—

=== International ===
Year	Team	Event	Result	GP	G	A	Pts	PIM
2017	Canada Red	U17	2nd place, silver medalist(s)	6	3	4	7	2
2018	Canada	HG18	1st place, gold medalist(s)	5	1	7	8	4
2019	Canada	U18	4th	5	0	1	1	0
2021	Canada	WJC	2nd place, silver medalist(s)	7	2	2	4	0
Junior totals				23	6	14	20	6

== Awards and honours ==
Award	Year	Ref
AHL
Calder Cup champion	2022	

Awards and achievements
Preceded by Andrei Svechnikov	Carolina Hurricanes first-round draft pick 2019	Succeeded by Seth Jarvis
