= Aku Räty =

Finnish ice hockey player (born 2001)

- Born: 5 July 2001 (age 25) Oulunsalo, Finland
- Height: 6 ft 1 in (185 cm)
- Weight: 185 lb (84 kg; 13 st 3 lb)
- Position: Right wing
- Shoots: Right
- NHL team (P) Cur. team Former teams: Edmonton Oilers; Bakersfield Condors (AHL); Oulun Kärpät; Ilves; Arizona Coyotes
- NHL draft: 151st overall, 2019; Arizona Coyotes
- Playing career: 2019–present

Aku Räty (Finnish: [ˈɑːku ˈræty]) (born 5 July 2001) is a Finnish professional ice hockey right winger for the Bakersfield Condors in the American Hockey League (AHL) while under contract to the Edmonton Oilers of the National Hockey League (NHL). The Arizona Coyotes selected Räty 151st overall in the 2019 NHL entry draft. On 17 April 2024, he was the last player ever to debut for the Coyotes.

== Playing career ==
Räty developed in the Kärpät system alongside his brother, Aatu, with both being considered top prospects in the Finnish ranks in their respective NHL draft years. Aku remained on the board through the first four rounds of the 2019 NHL entry draft before the Arizona Coyotes selected him in the fifth round with the 151st overall pick.

After marking marginal impacts in the top-ranked Finnish Liiga with Oulun Kärpät in his first three post-draft seasons, Räty transferred to Ilves in 2022 and subsequently enjoyed a breakout year. Räty finished second on the team with 18 goals and fifth with 42 points in 53 games during the 2022–23 Liiga season, helping Ilves qualify for the playoffs as the second seed. He added one goal in 10 playoff games as Ilves were eliminated by the Lahti Pelicans in the Liiga semifinals.

On 3 May 2023, the Coyotes signed Räty to a two-year, entry-level contract to take effect in the 2023–24 NHL season. Räty's exclusive NHL draft signing rights with the Coyotes had been set to expire on 1 June 2023. He made his NHL debut on 17 April, in the Coyotes' final game in Arizona, a 5–2 win over the Edmonton Oilers, during which he recorded a point. The following day, sale was officially approved with the Arizona Coyotes franchise becoming officially deactivated until further notice and new expansion team, the Utah Hockey Club, taking their place. Räty's rights were transferred from Arizona to Utah accordingly.

On 7 March 2025, Räty, along with Victor Söderström and Shea Weber, was traded by Utah to the Chicago Blackhawks.

On 20 May 2025, Räty returned home to Kärpät, signing a two-year contract with the Liiga.

On 25 May 2026, it was announced that Räty had signed a one-year, two-way contract to return to North America, as part of the Edmonton Oilers organization.

== Personal life ==
Räty's younger brother, Aatu, was drafted in the second round of the 2021 NHL entry draft by the New York Islanders. He currently plays for the Toronto Maple Leafs.

== Career statistics ==
=== Regular season and playoffs ===
			Regular season					Playoffs
Season	Team	League	GP	G	A	Pts	PIM	GP	G	A	Pts	PIM
2018–19	Kärpät	Jr. A	52	19	26	45	28	11	3	6	9	4
2019–20	Kärpät	Jr. A	18	11	10	21	6	1	1	0	1	0
2019–20	Kärpät	Liiga	32	2	5	7	14	—	—	—	—	—
2020–21	Kärpät	Jr. A	2	0	0	0	0	—	—	—	—	—
2020–21	Kärpät	Liiga	36	4	3	7	6	4	0	0	0	0
2021–22	Kärpät	Liiga	56	11	11	22	34	7	1	1	2	4
2022–23	Ilves	Liiga	53	18	24	42	10	10	1	0	1	6
2023–24	Tucson Roadrunners	AHL	55	15	29	44	22	2	0	0	0	0
2023–24	Arizona Coyotes	NHL	1	0	1	1	0	—	—	—	—	—
2024–25	Tucson Roadrunners	AHL	50	4	15	19	28	—	—	—	—	—
2024–25	Rockford IceHogs	AHL	15	2	4	6	13	2	1	0	1	0
2025–26	Kärpät	Liiga	51	20	37	57	36	—	—	—	—	—
Liiga totals			228	55	80	135	100	21	2	1	3	10
NHL totals			1	0	1	1	0	—	—	—	—	—

=== International ===
Medal record

Representing Finland

Men's ice hockey

World Junior Championships
Bronze medal – third place	2021 Canada	

Year	Team	Event	Result	GP	G	A	Pts	PIM
2017	Finland	U17	6th	5	0	0	0	0
2018	Finland	HG18	7th	3	2	1	3	0
2019	Finland	U18	7th	5	2	0	2	0
2020	Finland	WJC	4th	7	2	1	3	2
2021	Finland	WJC	3rd place, bronze medalist(s)	7	2	1	3	8
Junior totals				27	8	3	11	10
