= Victor Söderström (ice hockey) =

Swedish ice hockey player (born 2001)

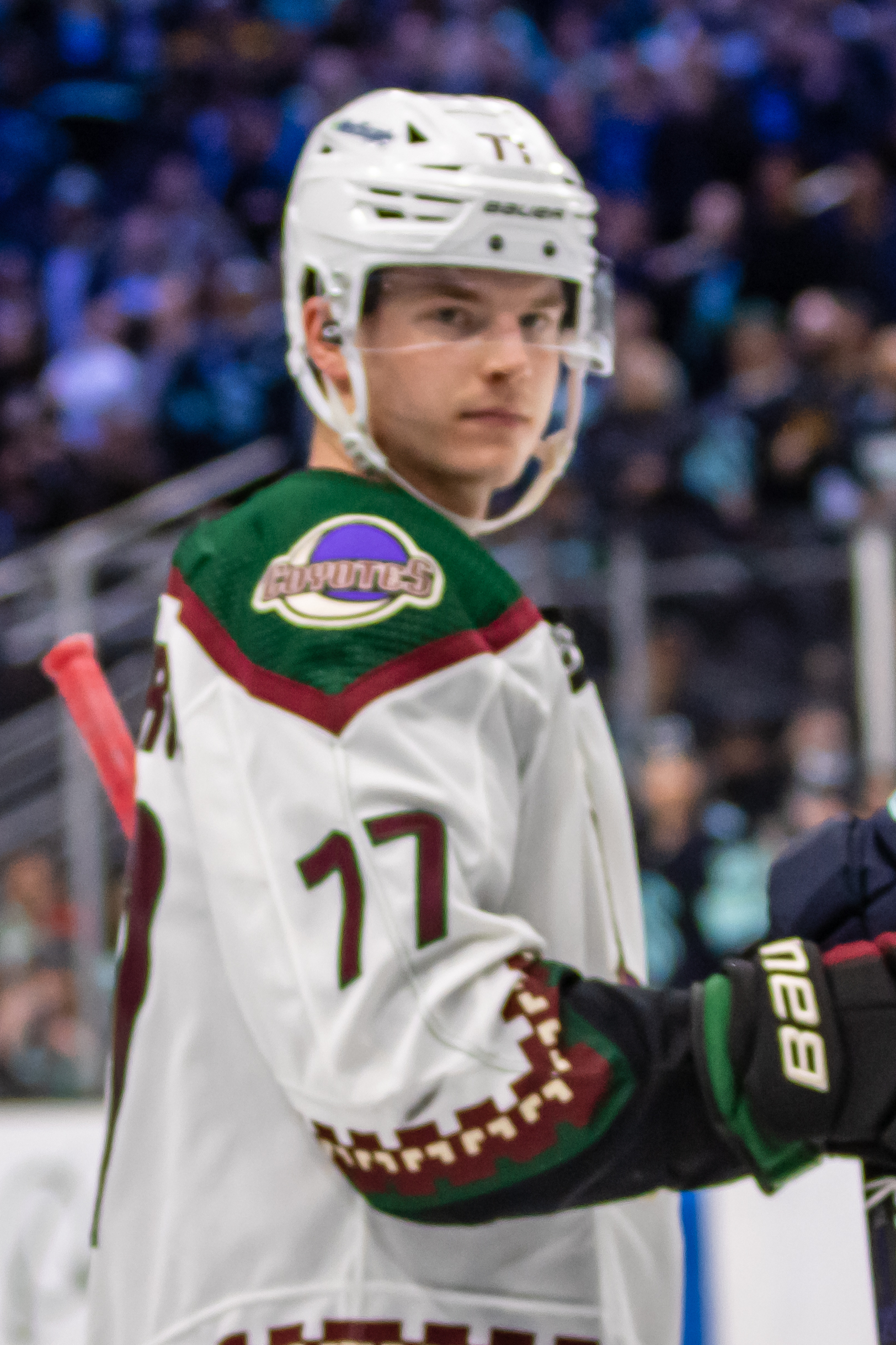
- Söderström with the Arizona Coyotes in 2023
- Born: 26 February 2001 (age 25) Skutskär, Sweden
- Height: 182.9 cm (6 ft 0 in)
- Weight: 85.7 kg (189 lb; 13 st 7 lb)
- Position: Defence
- Shoots: Right
- NL team Former teams: EHC Biel-Bienne; Brynäs IF; Arizona Coyotes; Boston Bruins
- NHL draft: 11th overall, 2019; Arizona Coyotes
- Playing career: 2018–present

Victor Söderström (born 26 February 2001) is a Swedish professional ice hockey player who is a defenceman for EHC Biel-Bienne of the National League (NL). Söderström was selected 11th overall by the Arizona Coyotes in the 2019 NHL entry draft. He also played for the Coyotes and Boston Bruins of the NHL and Brynäs IF of the Swedish Hockey League.

== Playing career ==
Söderström joined Brynäs IF as a 14-year old, playing through their junior ranks before he was elevated from the J20 SuperElit and made his professional debut in the Swedish Hockey League (SHL) at the age of 17 during the 2018–19 season on 18 October 2018. He was signed to his first professional contract by Brynäs, agreeing to a two-year deal through 2020 on 8 November 2018.

On 21 June 2019, Söderström was selected by the Arizona Coyotes of the National Hockey League (NHL), 11th overall in the 2019 NHL entry draft. The Coyotes traded up from the 14th overall with an additional second round pick to obtain the selection. Söderström signed a three-year, entry-level contract with the Coyotes on 7 July 2019.

In the 2019–20 season, Söderström was assigned on loan by the Coyotes to continue his development with his Swedish club, Brynäs IF. He featured in 35 games from the blueline, reaching new career highs with five goals and 16 points in the regular season, before the playoffs were cancelled due to the COVID-19 pandemic. Söderström returned to the Coyotes organization and was added to the return-to-play roster. He remained with the club through the 2020 Stanley Cup playoffs but did not play.

With the 2020–21 North American season to be delayed, on 1 September 2020, Söderström returned to Sweden in joining second-tier club, AIK of the HockeyAllsvenskan, on loan until the commencement of the Coyotes 2020 training camp. He made 12 appearances with AIK, registering six points, before leaving his loan stint in the Allsvenskan to join the Swedish World Junior team. Once the North American season returned, Söderström missed Arizona's training camp but was named to the Coyotes' taxi squad. He made his NHL debut on 22 January 2021 versus the Vegas Golden Knights. Söderström scored his first NHL goal on 7 May 2021 against Josef Kořenář in a 5–2 win over the San Jose Sharks. He also played for Arizona's American Hockey League (AHL) affiliate, the Tucson Roadrunners, scoring two goals and 10 points in 32 games.

Söderström split the 2021–22 season between the Roadrunners and the Coyotes. He repeated the feat during the 2022–23 season, but got into 30 games with the Coyotes registering nine points. He was assigned to Tucson to start the 2023–24 season. He was recalled by Arizona on 23 January 2024 after injuries to Matt Dumba and Troy Stecher. He made his NHL season debut against the Carolina Hurricanes on 27 January, but was immediately returned to Tucson due to the NHL All-Star Game break. He was recalled again on 8 March and got into two more games, going scoreless, before returning to Tucson after Travis Dermott returned to the lineup. He appeared in 62 games with Tucson, recording nine goals and 32 points. The Roadrunners qualified for the 2024 Calder Cup playoffs and faced the Calgary Wranglers in their first round, best-of-three series. The Wranglers swept the Roadrunners, winning two straight games. Söderström went scoreless in the two playoff games.

Following his fourth season within the Coyotes organization, Söderström's rights were transferred to the Utah Hockey Club after the Coyotes' suspension of operations. As a restricted free agent with Utah, Söderström opted to return to Sweden by signing a two-year contract with his original club, Brynäs IF of the SHL, on 15 September 2024. On 7 March 2025, Söderström's NHL rights, along with Aku Räty and Shea Weber, were traded to the Chicago Blackhawks in exchange for a fifth round pick in the 2026 NHL entry draft.

On 2 April 2025, following a season in which he recorded 37 points in 49 regular-season games as Brynäs surprisingly finished first overall, Söderström was voted the winner of the Salming Trophy as top defenceman in the SHL for the 2024–25 season. On 13 June, Chicago traded his NHL rights to the Boston Bruins for Ryan Mast and seventh-round pick in the 2025 NHL entry draft. He then signed a one-year, two-way contract with Boston on 14 June.

Having concluded his one-year tenure with the Bruins, Söderström returned to Europe to sign a two-year contract with Swiss club, EHC Biel-Bienne of the NL, on 20 May 2026.

== International play ==
Medal record

Representing Sweden

Ice hockey

World Junior Championships
| Bronze medal – third place | 2020 Czech Republic | |

World U18 Championships
| Gold medal – first place | 2019 Sweden | |

Söderström was selected to play for Sweden's under-18 team at the 2019 U18 World Championships. He was injured in the round-robin game versus Russia and missed the rest of the tournament. However, Sweden went on to win gold. He was selected for Sweden's junior team for the 2020 World Junior Championship and played with Rasmus Sandin on the team's top defence pairing. The team advanced to the bronze medal game to face Finland, who they defeated to take the medal. He returned to Sweden's junior team for the 2021 World Junior Championship. However, the team were knocked out of the tournament in the quarterfinals by Finland.

== Career statistics ==
=== Regular season and playoffs ===
| | | | Regular season | | | | | Playoffs |
| Season | Team | League | GP | G | A | Pts | PIM | GP | G | A | Pts | PIM |
|---|---|---|---|---|---|---|---|---|---|---|---|---|
| 2017–18 | Brynäs IF | J20 | 16 | 3 | 3 | 6 | 8 | 1 | 1 | 0 | 1 | 0 |
| 2018–19 | Brynäs IF | J20 | 14 | 1 | 7 | 8 | 2 | 2 | 0 | 1 | 1 | 4 |
| 2018–19 | Brynäs IF | SHL | 44 | 4 | 3 | 7 | 22 | — | — | — | — | — |
| 2019–20 | Brynäs IF | SHL | 35 | 5 | 11 | 16 | 12 | — | — | — | — | — |
| 2020–21 | AIK | Allsv | 12 | 1 | 5 | 6 | 6 | — | — | — | — | — |
| 2020–21 | Arizona Coyotes | NHL | 4 | 1 | 1 | 2 | 0 | — | — | — | — | — |
| 2020–21 | Tucson Roadrunners | AHL | 32 | 2 | 8 | 10 | 8 | 1 | 0 | 0 | 0 | 0 |
| 2021–22 | Arizona Coyotes | NHL | 16 | 0 | 0 | 0 | 6 | — | — | — | — | — |
| 2021–22 | Tucson Roadrunners | AHL | 32 | 3 | 16 | 19 | 24 | — | — | — | — | — |
| 2022–23 | Tucson Roadrunners | AHL | 44 | 2 | 19 | 21 | 28 | 2 | 0 | 0 | 0 | 2 |
| 2022–23 | Arizona Coyotes | NHL | 30 | 0 | 9 | 9 | 24 | — | — | — | — | — |
| 2023–24 | Tucson Roadrunners | AHL | 62 | 9 | 23 | 32 | 34 | 2 | 0 | 0 | 0 | 0 |
| 2023–24 | Arizona Coyotes | NHL | 3 | 0 | 0 | 0 | 0 | — | — | — | — | — |
| 2024–25 | Brynäs IF | SHL | 49 | 9 | 28 | 37 | 16 | 17 | 1 | 7 | 8 | 10 |
| 2025–26 | Providence Bruins | AHL | 57 | 9 | 21 | 30 | 33 | — | — | — | — | — |
| 2025–26 | Boston Bruins | NHL | 8 | 0 | 1 | 1 | 0 | — | — | — | — | — |
| SHL totals | | | 128 | 18 | 42 | 60 | 50 | 17 | 1 | 7 | 8 | 10 |
| NHL totals | | | 61 | 1 | 11 | 12 | 30 | — | — | — | — | — |

=== International ===
| Year | Team | Event | Result | GP | G | A | Pts | PIM |
|---|---|---|---|---|---|---|---|---|
| 2017 | Sweden | U17 | 8th | 5 | 1 | 0 | 1 | 2 |
| 2018 | Sweden | HG18 | 2nd place, silver medalist(s) | 2 | 1 | 1 | 2 | 0 |
| 2019 | Sweden | U18 | 1st place, gold medalist(s) | 4 | 0 | 1 | 1 | 2 |
| 2020 | Sweden | WJC | 3rd place, bronze medalist(s) | 7 | 1 | 5 | 6 | 6 |
| 2021 | Sweden | WJC | 5th | 5 | 0 | 5 | 5 | 0 |
| Junior totals | | | | 23 | 3 | 12 | 15 | 10 |

Awards and achievements
| Preceded by Barrett Hayton | Arizona Coyotes first-round draft pick 2019 | Succeeded by Dylan Guenther |
