= Ludvig Hedström =

Swedish ice hockey player

- Born: 14 April 2001 (age 25) Stockholm, Sweden
- Height: 5 ft 11 in (180 cm)
- Weight: 179 lb (81 kg; 12 st 11 lb)
- Position: Defence
- Shoots: Left
- CEHL team: EHC Neuwied
- Playing career: 2019–present

Ludvig Hedström (born 14 April 2001) is a Swedish professional ice hockey player. He is currently playing for EHC Neuwied of the Central European Hockey League (CEHL).

== Playing career ==
Hedström made his professional debut on 31 October 2019 playing for Djurgårdens IF away against Skellefteå AIK. He played one additional game in the SHL during the 2019–20 SHL season. He was sent on loan to Almtuna IS of the second tier HockeyAllsvenskan during the 2020–21 season, playing 16 games and scoring one point for the Uppsala-based club. Hedström scored his first goal in the SHL in a 5–3 win on home ice against Färjestad BK on 2 November 2021.

== International play ==
Hedström was part of the Sweden's national junior team at the 2021 World Junior Ice Hockey Championships. He played all of team Sweden's five games but did not score any points.

== Career statistics ==
=== Regular season and playoffs ===
			Regular season					Playoffs
Season	Team	League	GP	G	A	Pts	PIM	GP	G	A	Pts	PIM
2017–18	Djurgårdens IF	J20	6	0	0	0	0	—	—	—	—	—
2018–19	Djurgårdens IF	J20	43	2	10	12	36	8	0	2	2	4
2019–20	Djurgårdens IF	J20	42	2	13	15	28	—	—	—	—	—
2019–20	Djurgårdens IF	SHL	2	0	0	0	0	—	—	—	—	—
2020–21	Djurgårdens IF	J20	14	2	6	8	6	—	—	—	—	—
2020–21	Djurgårdens IF	SHL	4	0	1	1	0	—	—	—	—	—
2020–21	Segeltorps IF	Div.1	6	0	0	0	2	—	—	—	—	—
2020–21	Almtuna IS	Allsv	16	0	1	1	4	2	0	1	1	0
2021–22	Djurgårdens IF	SHL	48	2	7	9	6	—	—	—	—	—
SHL totals			54	2	8	10	6	—	—	—	—	—

=== International ===
Year	Team	Event	Result	GP	G	A	Pts	PIM
2017	Sweden	U17	8th	5	0	0	0	2
2018	Sweden	HG18	2nd place, silver medalist(s)	5	1	0	1	4
2019	Sweden	U18	1st place, gold medalist(s)	7	0	1	1	2
2021	Sweden	WJC	5th	5	0	0	0	4
Junior totals				22	1	1	2	12
