= Dylan Holloway =

Canadian ice hockey player (born 2001)

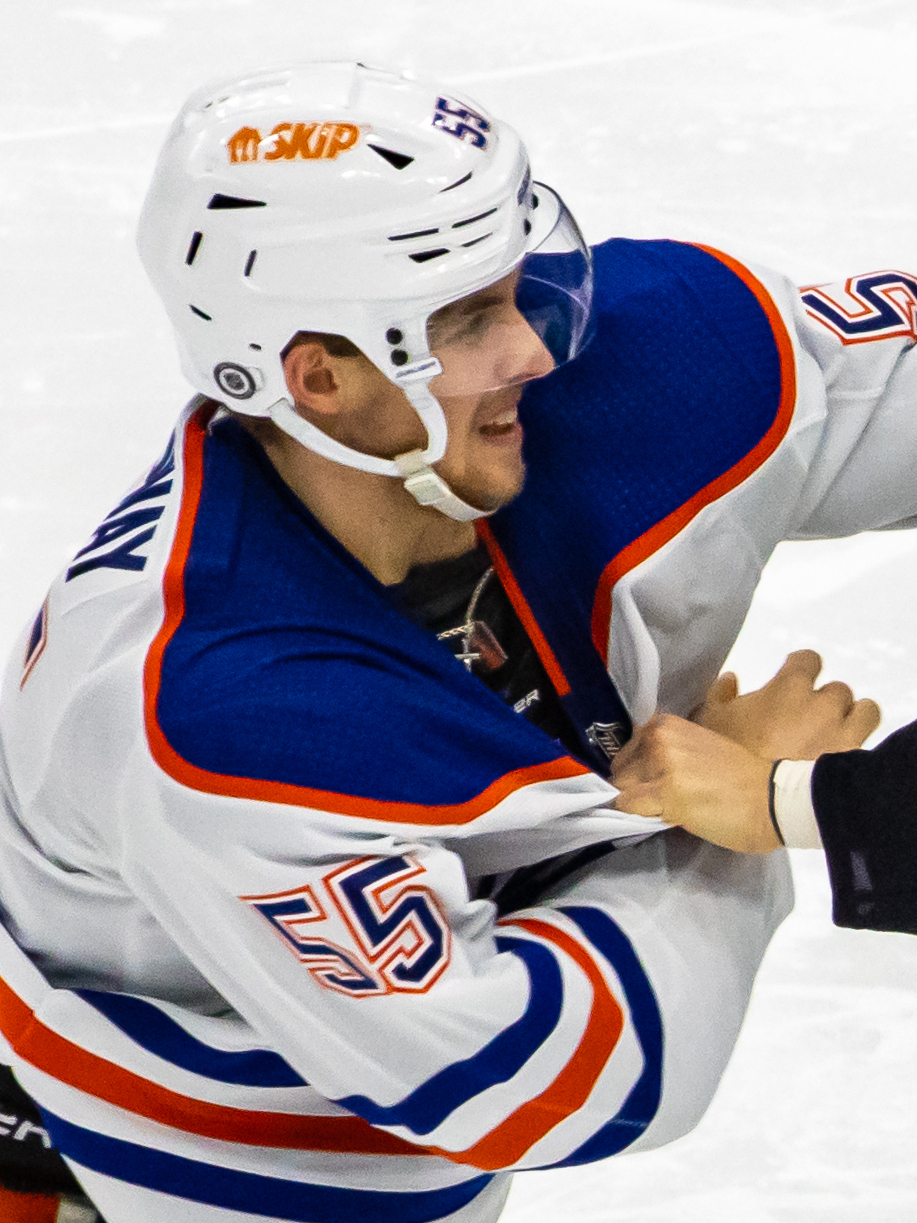
- Holloway during a fight with Vince Dunn in 2022
- Born: September 23, 2001 (age 24) Calgary, Alberta, Canada
- Height: 6 ft 1 in (185 cm)
- Weight: 207 lb (94 kg; 14 st 11 lb)
- Position: Centre
- Shoots: Left
- NHL team Former teams: St. Louis Blues; Edmonton Oilers
- National team: Canada
- NHL draft: 14th overall, 2020; Edmonton Oilers
- Playing career: 2022–present

Dylan Holloway (born September 23, 2001) is a Canadian professional ice hockey player who is a centre and alternate captain for the St. Louis Blues of the National Hockey League (NHL). Holloway was selected 14th overall by the Edmonton Oilers in the 2020 NHL entry draft.

== Playing career ==
=== Amateur ===
Beginning in the 2016–17 season, Holloway spent parts of three seasons with the Okotoks Oilers of the Alberta Junior Hockey League (AJHL), finishing second in league scoring with 40 goals and 88 points in 53 games in 2018–19. The NHL Central Scouting Bureau rated Holloway as the 12th-best North American skater eligible for selection in 2020.

Holloway played collegiate hockey for the Wisconsin Badgers of the NCAA's Big Ten Conference.

On October 6, 2020, at the 2020 NHL entry draft, Holloway was selected by the Edmonton Oilers with the 14th overall pick. In his sophomore season with the Badgers, Holloway added 11 goals and 24 assists in 23 games, ranking fifth in NCAA scoring and fourth in points per game.

On April 16, 2021, Holloway opted to conclude his collegiate career, signing a three-year, entry-level contract with the Edmonton Oilers.

=== Professional ===
Holloway had surgery on his wrist in March 2021, followed by a different surgery on the same wrist in September 2021, requiring at least three months of recovery time. After his surgical recovery and experiencing a bout of COVID-19, he was finally cleared to play in January 2022. Holloway spent the 2021–22 season in the American Hockey League with the Oilers' affiliate Bakersfield Condors, managing 8 goals and 14 assists in 33 games in the regular season, and then an additional 2 goals and 2 assists during 4 games in the 2022 Calder Cup playoffs before the Condors were eliminated.

On June 6, 2022, Holloway made his NHL debut for the Oilers in Game 4 of the 2022 Western Conference Finals against the Colorado Avalanche. He was called up following the suspension of Oilers forward Evander Kane and another regular, Kailer Yamamoto, injured. The Oilers, down three games to zero going in, lost the game 6–5 and were eliminated.

Holloway scored his first NHL goal in a 4–3 comeback victory against the New York Rangers on November 26, 2022.

On August 13, 2024, Holloway was tendered an offer sheet from the St. Louis Blues for 2 years and $2.29M per year. The Oilers declined to match the offer, so on August 20, he was officially signed by the Blues. A third round pick was awarded to the Oilers as compensation.

On November 5, 2024, Holloway was taken out of a game against the Tampa Bay Lightning on a stretcher and was sent to a local hospital after he was hit with a hockey puck in the neck. In a December 23 game against the host Detroit Red Wings, Holloway scored three goals -- one in each period of the game -- to record his first NHL hat trick.

== Career statistics ==
=== Regular season and playoffs ===
			Regular season					Playoffs
Season	Team	League	GP	G	A	Pts	PIM	GP	G	A	Pts	PIM
2016–17	Okotoks Oilers	AJHL	2	0	0	0	0	—	—	—	—	—
2017–18	Okotoks Oilers	AJHL	28	11	16	27	16	6	4	0	4	4
2018–19	Okotoks Oilers	AJHL	53	40	48	88	56	7	8	3	11	24
2019–20	University of Wisconsin	B1G	35	8	9	17	49	—	—	—	—	—
2020–21	University of Wisconsin	B1G	23	11	24	35	19	—	—	—	—	—
2021–22	Bakersfield Condors	AHL	33	8	14	22	16	5	2	2	4	4
2021–22	Edmonton Oilers	NHL	—	—	—	—	—	1	0	0	0	0
2022–23	Edmonton Oilers	NHL	51	3	6	9	27	—	—	—	—	—
2022–23	Bakersfield Condors	AHL	12	7	3	10	4	2	0	0	0	2
2023–24	Edmonton Oilers	NHL	38	6	3	9	29	25	5	2	7	8
2023–24	Bakersfield Condors	AHL	18	10	6	16	12	—	—	—	—	—
2024–25	St. Louis Blues	NHL	77	26	37	63	10	—	—	—	—	—
2025–26	St. Louis Blues	NHL	59	22	29	51	20	—	—	—	—	—
NHL totals			225	57	75	132	86	26	5	2	7	8

Medal record

Representing Canada

Ice hockey

World Junior Championships
Silver medal – second place	2021 Canada	

=== International ===
Year	Team	Event	Result	GP	G	A	Pts	PIM
2017	Canada Red	U17	2nd place, silver medalist(s)	6	1	0	1	0
2018	Canada	HG18	1st place, gold medalist(s)	5	1	2	3	2
2019	Canada	U18	4th	7	2	2	4	10
2021	Canada	WJC	2nd place, silver medalist(s)	6	1	1	2	2
2026	Canada	WC	4th	10	4	2	6	2
Junior totals				13	3	3	6	12
Senior totals				10	4	2	6	2

== Awards and honours ==
Award	Year
AJHL
South All-Rookie Team	2018
South All-Star Team	2019
MVP	2019
CJHL Player of the Year	2019
College
B1G First All-Star Team	2021
AHCA West Second Team All-American	2021
Hobey Baker Award (finalist)	2021

Awards and achievements
Preceded by Philip Broberg	Edmonton Oilers' first-round draft pick 2020	Succeeded by Xavier Bourgault
