= Justin Barron =

Canadian ice hockey player (born 2001)

- Born: November 15, 2001 (age 25) Halifax, Nova Scotia, Canada
- Height: 6 ft 2 in (188 cm)
- Weight: 198 lb (90 kg; 14 st 2 lb)
- Position: Defence
- Shoots: Right
- NHL team Former teams: St. Louis Blues; Colorado Avalanche; Montreal Canadiens; Nashville Predators
- National team: Canada
- NHL draft: 25th overall, 2020; Colorado Avalanche
- Playing career: 2021–present

Justin Barron (born November 15, 2001) is a Canadian professional ice hockey player who is a defenceman for the St. Louis Blues of the National Hockey League (NHL). He was selected in the first round, 25th overall, by the Colorado Avalanche in the 2020 NHL entry draft. Barron has also previously played for the Montreal Canadiens and Nashville Predators.

== Playing career ==
=== Junior ===
Following three seasons of major junior hockey for the Halifax Mooseheads of the Quebec Major Junior Hockey League (QMJHL), Barron was selected in the first round, 25th overall, by the Colorado Avalanche in the 2020 NHL entry draft.

Ahead of the 2020–21 season, Barron was named captain of the Mooseheads franchise. During the pandemic-interrupted campaign, he recorded 31 points in 33 games played. On April 27, 2021, the Avalanche signed Barron to a three-year, entry-level contract. He concurrently signed an amateur tryout (ATO) agreement with the Avalanche's American Hockey League (AHL) affiliate, the Colorado Eagles, and joined the team for the remainder of the 2020–21 AHL season.

=== Professional ===
==== Colorado Avalanche ====
Barron made his NHL debut with the Avalanche in the 2021–22 season, appearing in a December 15, 2021, game against the New York Rangers. Collectively, he appeared in 50 games with the Eagles, registering six goals and eighteen assists, along with two scoreless games with the Avalanche.

==== Montreal Canadiens ====
On March 21, 2022, Barron was traded by the Avalanche, along with a 2024 second-round draft pick, to the Montreal Canadiens in exchange for forward Artturi Lehkonen. He initially attracted good publicity upon his arrival in Montreal, specifically by demonstrating proficiency in French as a result of having taken immersion classes during his schooling in Nova Scotia. Barron made his debut with the team in a March 27 game against the New Jersey Devils, amassing 17:55 of total ice time. He registered his first career NHL point, an assist, in a March 29 game against the Florida Panthers. Thereafter, Barron scored his first career NHL goal in an April 5 game against the Ottawa Senators, his first home game at the Bell Centre. He suffered an ankle injury in the same game and exited early. Seven days later, the team announced that he would miss the remainder of the season and would be unable to join the Laval Rocket, the franchise's AHL affiliate, for the Calder Cup playoffs.

After recovering from injury, it was widely assumed that Barron would make the Canadiens' roster for the 2022–23 season out of training camp. However, after an underwhelming performance in the preseason, he was instead assigned to Laval. He admitted that this was initially difficult to process, but after some struggles in his early games with the Rocket, he set about "to play well enough to hopefully be that first call-up, and at some point, get back up there." He was soon credited as the team's strongest defenceman. On December 27, he was recalled by the Canadiens, having managed seven goals and nine assists in 25 AHL games. Barron played the remainder of the season in the NHL, drawing generally positive assessments. After the Canadiens failed to qualify for the 2024 Stanley Cup playoffs, Barron was one of four players reassigned to Laval to end the season.

A restricted free agent following the 2023–24 season, Barron was tendered a qualifying offer by the Canadiens on June 30, 2024. A month later, he signed a two-year, $2.3 million contract extension.

Early on into the 2024–25 season, Barron skated in his 100th career NHL game, a 4–3 shootout loss versus the New York Islanders on October 19.

==== Nashville Predators ====
On December 18, 2024, Barron was traded to the Nashville Predators in exchange for fellow defenceman Alexandre Carrier. Following the 2025–26 season, he agreed to a one-year extension with the team on July 6, 2026.

==== St. Louis Blues ====
Before the beginning of the 2026–27 season, Barron was placed on waivers by the Predators on September 26, 2026, for purpose of reassignment to AHL affiliate, the Milwaukee Admirals. The following day, however, he was subsequently claimed by the St. Louis Blues.

== International play ==
Medal record

Representing Canada

Men's ice hockey

World Championships
Gold medal – first place	2023 Finland/Latvia	

World Junior Championships
Silver medal – second place	2021 Canada	

Hlinka Gretzky Cup
Gold medal – first place	2018 Canada	

World U-17 Hockey Challenge
Silver medal – second place	2017 Canada	

Internationally, Barron first represented Hockey Canada as part of team Canada Red at the 2017 World U-17 Hockey Challenge, earning a silver medal. He then captured gold along with his country's national under-18 team at the 2018 Hlinka Gretzky Cup.

In December 2020, Barron was selected to play for the national junior team at the annual World Junior Ice Hockey Championships where he had two assists in seven games as Canada was defeated by the United States in the gold medal game.

Following the Montreal Canadiens not qualifying for the 2023 Stanley Cup playoffs, Barron accepted an invitation to join the national senior team at the 2023 IIHF World Championship, winning a gold medal.

== Personal life ==
Barron's older brother, Morgan, is a professional ice hockey player for the Winnipeg Jets.

== Career statistics ==
=== Regular season and playoffs ===
			Regular season					Playoffs
Season	Team	League	GP	G	A	Pts	PIM	GP	G	A	Pts	PIM
2017–18	Halifax Mooseheads	QMJHL	51	2	19	21	8	9	0	3	3	2
2018–19	Halifax Mooseheads	QMJHL	68	9	32	41	34	23	2	11	13	10
2019–20	Halifax Mooseheads	QMJHL	34	4	15	19	6	—	—	—	—	—
2020–21	Halifax Mooseheads	QMJHL	33	8	23	31	40	—	—	—	—	—
2020–21	Colorado Eagles	AHL	7	1	3	4	4	2	1	2	3	0
2021–22	Colorado Eagles	AHL	43	5	15	20	8	—	—	—	—	—
2021–22	Colorado Avalanche	NHL	2	0	0	0	0	—	—	—	—	—
2021–22	Montreal Canadiens	NHL	5	1	1	2	0	—	—	—	—	—
2022–23	Laval Rocket	AHL	25	7	9	16	6	—	—	—	—	—
2022–23	Montreal Canadiens	NHL	39	4	11	15	20	—	—	—	—	—
2023–24	Montreal Canadiens	NHL	48	7	6	13	16	—	—	—	—	—
2023–24	Laval Rocket	AHL	32	2	9	11	10	—	—	—	—	—
2024–25	Montreal Canadiens	NHL	17	1	0	1	8	—	—	—	—	—
2024–25	Nashville Predators	NHL	45	5	7	12	15	—	—	—	—	—
2025–26	Nashville Predators	NHL	52	0	9	9	17	—	—	—	—	—
NHL totals			208	18	34	52	76	—	—	—	—	—

=== International ===
Year	Team	Event	Result	GP	G	A	Pts	PIM
2017	Canada Red	U17	2nd place, silver medalist(s)	6	0	1	1	2
2018	Canada	HG18	1st place, gold medalist(s)	5	0	5	5	0
2021	Canada	WJC	2nd place, silver medalist(s)	7	0	2	2	0
2023	Canada	WC	1st place, gold medalist(s)	10	0	3	3	2
Junior totals				18	0	8	8	2
Senior totals				10	0	3	3	2

== Awards and honours ==
Award	Year	Ref
CHL
CHL Canada/Russia Series	2018, 2019	
CHL/NHL Top Prospects Game	2020	
QMJHL
All-Rookie Team	2018	
Second All-Star Team	2021	
AHL
All-Star Game	2023	

Awards and achievements
Preceded by Alex Newhook	Colorado Avalanche first-round draft pick 2020	Succeeded by Oskar Olausson
