= Leevi Aaltonen =

Finnish ice hockey player (born 2001)

- Born: 24 January 2001 (age 25) Mikkeli, Finland
- Height: 5 ft 9 in (175 cm)
- Weight: 176 lb (80 kg; 12 st 8 lb)
- Position: Winger
- Shoots: Left
- Liiga team Former teams: KooKoo; KalPa
- NHL draft: 130th overall, 2019; New York Rangers
- Playing career: 2019–present

Leevi Aaltonen (born January 24, 2001) is a Finnish ice hockey winger who plays for KooKoo in Liiga. He played in 7 games for KalPa in 2018–19 with no goals and one assist. He was drafted by the New York Rangers in the 5th round of the 2019 NHL entry draft with the 130th pick in the draft.

== Career statistics ==
=== Regular season and playoffs ===
			Regular season					Playoffs
Season	Team	League	GP	G	A	Pts	PIM	GP	G	A	Pts	PIM
2016–17	KalPa	Jr. A	2	0	0	0	2	—	—	—	—	—
2017–18	KalPa	Jr. A	34	8	13	21	4	13	2	5	7	2
2018–19	KalPa	Jr. A	29	12	24	36	28	6	1	2	3	31
2018–19	KalPa	Liiga	7	0	1	1	0	—	—	—	—	—
2018–19	IPK	Mestis	1	0	0	0	0	—	—	—	—	—
2019–20	KalPa	Liiga	45	1	6	7	4	—	—	—	—	—
2019–20	KalPa	Jr. A	1	0	0	0	0	—	—	—	—	—
2019–20	IPK	Mestis	3	2	2	4	0	—	—	—	—	—
2020–21	KalPa	Liiga	22	1	4	5	4	—	—	—	—	—
2020–21	KalPa	Jr. A	2	1	1	2	4	—	—	—	—	—
2020–21	IPK	Mestis	5	3	3	6	0	—	—	—	—	—
2021–22	KooKoo	Liiga	47	6	4	10	6	16	0	1	1	4
2022–23	KooKoo	Liiga	42	4	4	8	2	7	0	2	2	0
2023–24	KooKoo	Liiga	41	3	7	10	14	–	–	–	–	–
2024–25	BIK Karlskoga	HockeyAllsvenskan	31	3	3	6	12	4	0	0	0	0
Liiga totals			204	15	26	41	30	23	0	3	3	4

Medal record

Representing Finland

Ice hockey

World U18 Championships
Gold medal – first place	2018 Russia	

=== International ===
Year	Team	Event	Result	GP	G	A	Pts	PIM
2016	Finland	U17	7th	5	0	0	0	0
2017	Finland	IH18	6th	4	3	2	5	0
2017	Finland	U17	6th	5	1	2	3	2
2018	Finland	U18	1st place, gold medalist(s)	7	2	0	2	2
2018	Finland	HG18	7th	4	0	2	2	2
2019	Finland	U18	7th	5	1	4	5	2
Junior totals				30	7	10	17	8
