= Vasily Podkolzin =

Russian ice hockey player (born 2001)

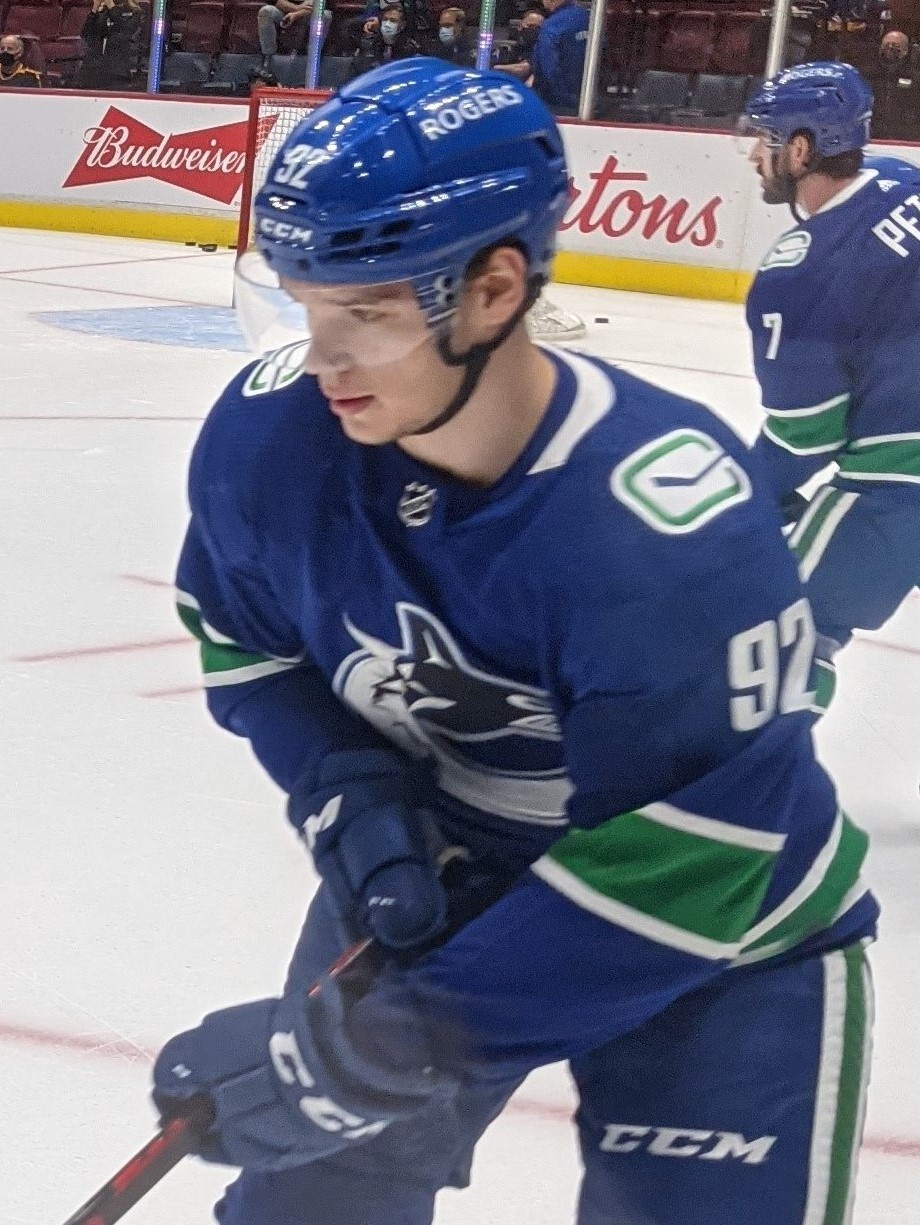
- Podkolzin with the Vancouver Canucks in 2021
- Born: 24 June 2001 (age 25) Moscow, Russia
- Height: 6 ft 1 in (185 cm)
- Weight: 212 lb (96 kg; 15 st 2 lb)
- Position: Winger
- Shoots: Left
- NHL team Former teams: Edmonton Oilers; SKA Saint Petersburg; Vancouver Canucks
- NHL draft: 10th overall, 2019; Vancouver Canucks
- Playing career: 2018–present

Vasily Alexandrovich Podkolzin (alternately spelled Vasili Podkolzin, Russian: Василий Александрович Подколзин; born 24 June 2001) is a Russian professional ice hockey player who is a winger for the Edmonton Oilers of the National Hockey League (NHL). He was selected tenth overall by the Vancouver Canucks in the 2019 NHL entry draft and made his NHL debut with them in 2021. Before joining Vancouver Podkolzin played for SKA Saint Petersburg of the Kontinental Hockey League. Internationally Podkolzin has played for the Russian national junior team at several tournaments.

== Playing career ==
=== Junior ===
Podkolzin played for the Belye Medvedi club until he was 12 years old when he moved to Vityaz Podolsk. The move was done both because Belye Medvedi has no professional affiliate, and their leadership had changed. He spent four years with Vityaz at their school, but was not given a chance to play for their club in the Junior Hockey League (MHL), the top junior league in Russia, so in 2018 he decided to transfer to powerhouse SKA Saint Petersburg.

=== Professional ===
==== SKA Saint Petersburg ====
On 12 November 2018, Podkolzin made his Kontinental Hockey League (KHL) debut with SKA Saint Petersburg, becoming the first player born in the 21st century to play in the KHL. He split the 2018–19 season between three teams and leagues: three games with SKA; fourteen with SKA-Neva of the Supreme Hockey League (VHL), the minor league for the KHL; and twelve games with SKA-1946 of the MHL.

Rated by the NHL Central Scouting Bureau as the second-best international (playing outside of North America) skater, Podkolzin was a highly regarded prospect going into the 2019 NHL entry draft. He was selected tenth overall by the Vancouver Canucks. As he still had a contract with SKA for two more seasons, Podkolzin remained in Russia before moving to the NHL.

==== Vancouver Canucks ====
On 30 May 2021, Podkolzin was signed by the Vancouver Canucks to a three-year, entry-level contract. He scored his first NHL goal against the Philadelphia Flyers' Carter Hart on 15 October in his second NHL game.

During the season, while beginning the year playing with AHL affiliate, the Abbotsford Canucks, Podkolzin was taken off ice on a stretcher during a game against the Colorado Eagles, due to a collision with Keaton Middleton. Podkolzin made 44 appearances with Abbotsford, registering 28 points, he was recalled to Vancouver on multiple occasions registering 2 assists through 19 games.

As a pending restricted free agent, Podkolzin was re-signed by the Canucks to a two-year, $2 million contract on 19 April 2024. Before commencing his contract with the Canucks, Podkolzin was traded by Vancouver to the Edmonton Oilers in exchange for a fourth-round pick in the 2025 NHL entry draft on 18 August 2024.

==== Edmonton Oilers ====
Podkolzin signed a three-year, $8,850,000 contract on 23 September 2025 after recording 24 points during his first year with the team. The following season saw him record career highs in goals, points, and assists.

Podkolzin was placed on the first line with Connor McDavid and Leon Draisaitl to start the 2026–27 season. The change saw him record the best start of his career, as well as becoming an enforcer for the team. In a notable incident, while playing against the Anaheim Ducks on 5 November 2026, Ducks defender Drew Helleson shoved McDavid into the post of the net. While McDavid was ultimately unharmed, Podkolzin dropped his gloves and attacked Helleson. Podkolzin received a game misconduct for the play.

== International play ==
Medal record

Men's ice hockey

Representing Russia

World Junior Championships
Silver medal – second place	2020 Czech Republic	
Bronze medal – third place	2019 Canada	

In 2018, Podkolzin captained Russia in the Hlinka Gretzky Cup where he won a bronze medal. In the bronze medal game against the United States, Podkolzin scored a hat trick in a 5–4 victory. He led the tournament in scoring with 8 goals, 3 assists and 11 total points in 5 games.

Podkolzin next played internationally at the 2019 World Junior Championships in Vancouver, Canada. He recorded 3 assists in 7 games, helping Russia win bronze. He also played at the 2019 Under-18 World Championships, scoring four points in seven games. Podkolzin then played in the 2020 World Junior Championships in Ostrava. He scored five points in seven games, registering a goal and 4 assists. Russia fell in the final to Canada, leaving with a silver medal. In 2021, he was named captain of Team Russia, where he led the team to a 4th place finish. He scored four points in seven games with two goals and two assists.

== Personal life ==
Podkolzin was born in Moscow and grew up in the Maryino District of the city. He has one younger brother, Mikhail (born 2011), who also plays hockey. Podkolzin's father, Alexander, was an entrepreneur, while his mother teaches piano. He first skated at the age of four and began to play hockey shortly after that. His grandfather played for Khimik Voskresensk, and his father played in an amateur league. When he was eight, Podkolzin joined the Belye Medvedi (White Bears) club. The Belye Medvedi facilities were on the opposite side of the city from the Podkolzin home (north-west and south-east, respectively); it took over an hour via metro and bus for Podkolzin to reach the rink. When he moved to Saint Petersburg, Podkolzin stayed in an apartment with a teammate, Ivan Manin.

== Career statistics ==
=== Regular season and playoffs ===
			Regular season					Playoffs
Season	Team	League	GP	G	A	Pts	PIM	GP	G	A	Pts	PIM
2018–19	SKA Saint Petersburg	KHL	3	0	0	0	0	—	—	—	—	—
2018–19	SKA-Neva	VHL	14	2	3	5	4	8	2	1	3	0
2018–19	SKA-1946	MHL	12	6	2	8	2	3	2	1	3	0
2019–20	SKA Saint Petersburg	KHL	30	2	6	8	7	4	1	2	3	0
2019–20	SKA-Neva	VHL	16	3	5	8	6	1	0	0	0	0
2019–20	SKA-1946	MHL	2	0	4	4	6	—	—	—	—	—
2020–21	SKA Saint Petersburg	KHL	35	5	6	11	15	16	6	5	11	6
2020–21	SKA-Neva	VHL	1	0	1	1	0	—	—	—	—	—
2021–22	Vancouver Canucks	NHL	79	14	12	26	26	—	—	—	—	—
2021–22	Abbotsford Canucks	AHL	—	—	—	—	—	2	1	1	2	0
2022–23	Vancouver Canucks	NHL	39	4	3	7	9	—	—	—	—	—
2022–23	Abbotsford Canucks	AHL	28	7	11	18	12	—	—	—	—	—
2023–24	Abbotsford Canucks	AHL	44	15	13	28	15	3	0	1	1	2
2023–24	Vancouver Canucks	NHL	19	0	2	2	8	2	0	0	0	10
2024–25	Edmonton Oilers	NHL	82	8	16	24	48	22	3	7	10	20
2025–26	Edmonton Oilers	NHL	82	19	18	37	63	6	3	3	6	5
NHL totals			301	45	51	96	154	30	6	10	16	35
KHL totals			68	7	12	19	22	20	7	7	14	6

=== International ===
Year	Team	Event	GP	G	A	Pts	PIM
2017	Russia	U17	5	1	5	6	10
2018	Russia	U18	4	2	2	4	0
2018	Russia	HG18	5	8	3	11	8
2019	Russia	WJC	7	0	3	3	4
2020	Russia	WJC	7	1	4	5	8
2021	Russia	WJC	7	2	2	4	8
Junior totals			35	14	19	33	38

== Awards and honors ==
Award	Year	Ref
International
World Junior A Challenge – All-Star Team	2018	

Awards and achievements
Preceded by Quinn Hughes	Vancouver Canucks first-round draft pick 2019	Succeeded by Jonathan Lekkerimäki
