= Aatu Räty =

Finnish ice hockey player (born 2002)

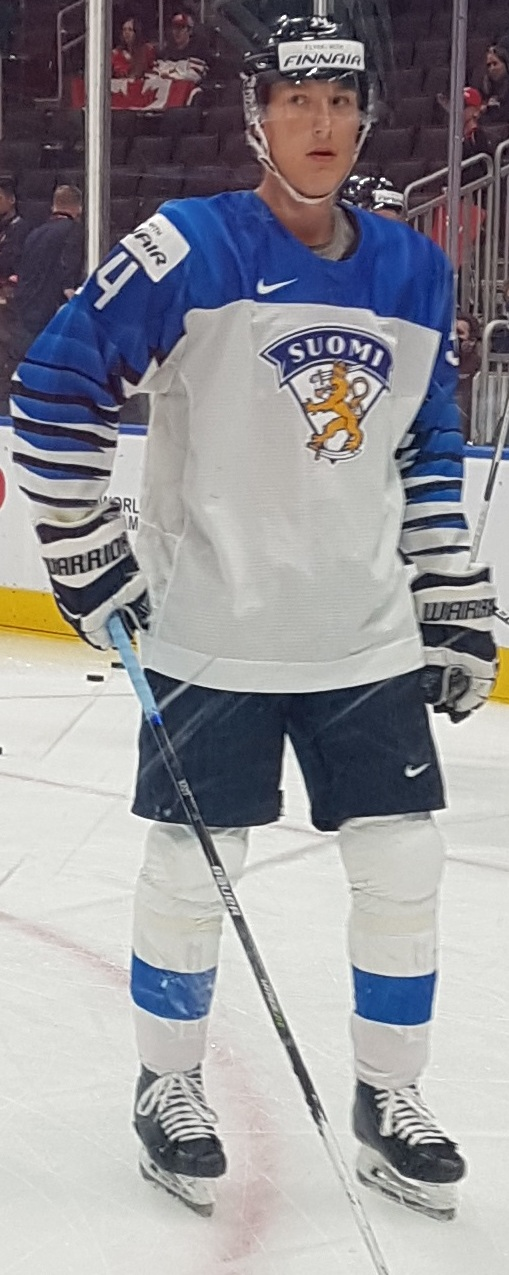
- Räty at the 2022 World Junior Championships
- Born: 14 November 2002 (age 23) Oulunsalo, Finland
- Height: 6 ft 2 in (188 cm)
- Weight: 204 lb (93 kg; 14 st 8 lb)
- Position: Centre
- Shoots: Left
- NHL team (P) Cur. team Former teams: Toronto Maple Leafs; Toronto Marlies (AHL); Kärpät; Jukurit; New York Islanders; Vancouver Canucks
- National team: Finland
- NHL draft: 52nd overall, 2021; New York Islanders
- Playing career: 2019–present

Aatu Räty (Finnish: [ˈɑːtu ˈræty]) (born 14 November 2002) is a Finnish professional ice hockey player who is a centre for the Toronto Marlies of the American Hockey League (AHL) while under contract to the Toronto Maple Leafs of the National Hockey League (NHL). He was selected 52nd overall in the 2021 NHL entry draft by the New York Islanders, and has also played for the Vancouver Canucks.

== Playing career ==
Räty made his Liiga debut at age 16 and scored his first professional goal in the same game. Räty was considered a top prospect in the 2021 NHL Entry Draft. The presumptive first overall pick before the start of the season, Räty fell in draft rankings after what scouts viewed as a difficult season playing for Oulun Kärpät, scoring just six points in 35 games.

On 14 August 2021, the New York Islanders announced that they had signed Räty to a three-year, entry-level contract. Räty was assigned to the Bridgeport Islanders of the American Hockey League (AHL) on 19 April 2022, after his team's, Jukurit, 2021–22 Liiga season ended with elimination in the playoffs.

In the 2022–23 season, Räty was initially reassigned to continue his tenure in the AHL with Bridgeport before he was recalled on 23 December 2022, and made his NHL debut for the New York Islanders, scoring his first career NHL goal against the Florida Panthers in a 5–1 win.

Following 12 games with the Islanders, posting 2 goals, Räty was traded with Anthony Beauvillier and a conditional first-round pick in 2023 to the Vancouver Canucks on 30 January 2023, as part of a multi-player deal that sent Bo Horvat to the Islanders.

Räty would leave game 2 of the Abbotsford Canucks 2025 Western Conference Final against the Texas Stars due to injury, en route to the team's first Calder Cup victory.

On 14 October 2026, Räty was waived by the Canucks; after clearing waivers the following day, he was traded to the Toronto Maple Leafs, in exchange for Brandon Buhr and Jacob Quillan.

== Personal life ==
Räty's older brother, Aku, was drafted in the fifth round of the 2019 NHL entry draft by the Arizona Coyotes.

== Career statistics ==
=== Regular season and playoffs ===
			Regular season					Playoffs
Season	Team	League	GP	G	A	Pts	PIM	GP	G	A	Pts	PIM
2018–19	Kärpät	Jr. A	41	17	14	31	26	10	4	8	12	0
2019–20	Kärpät	Jr. A	30	2	19	21	28	1	0	0	0	0
2019–20	Kärpät	Liiga	12	2	2	4	2	—	—	—	—	—
2020–21	Kärpät	Jr. A	8	3	4	7	2	—	—	—	—	—
2020–21	Kärpät	Liiga	35	3	3	6	18	3	0	0	0	0
2021–22	Kärpät	Liiga	6	0	1	1	2	—	—	—	—	—
2021–22	Jukurit	Liiga	41	13	27	40	32	7	0	2	2	34
2021–22	Bridgeport Islanders	AHL	2	0	0	0	0	6	1	3	4	6
2022–23	Bridgeport Islanders	AHL	27	7	8	15	12	—	—	—	—	—
2022–23	New York Islanders	NHL	12	2	0	2	4	—	—	—	—	—
2022–23	Abbotsford Canucks	AHL	25	2	10	12	6	3	1	0	1	2
2022–23	Vancouver Canucks	NHL	3	0	1	1	0	—	—	—	—	—
2023–24	Abbotsford Canucks	AHL	72	18	34	52	18	6	2	2	4	2
2024–25	Abbotsford Canucks	AHL	43	17	23	40	38	6	0	3	3	4
2024–25	Vancouver Canucks	NHL	33	7	4	11	14	—	—	—	—	—
2025–26	Vancouver Canucks	NHL	66	4	10	14	22	—	—	—	—	—
2026–27	Vancouver Canucks	NHL	4	1	0	1	2	—	—	—	—	—
Liiga totals			94	18	33	51	54	10	0	2	2	34
NHL totals			118	14	15	29	42	—	—	—	—	—

=== International ===
Medal record

Mens ice hockey

Representing Finland

World Championships
Gold medal – first place	2026 Switzerland	

World Junior Championships
Silver medal – second place	2022 Canada	

Year	Team	Event	Result	GP	G	A	Pts	PIM
2018	Finland	U17	2nd place, silver medalist(s)	6	3	0	3	0
2019	Finland	U18	7th	5	0	1	1	4
2019	Finland	HG18	4th	5	2	1	3	6
2020	Finland	WJC	4th	7	2	1	3	2
2022	Finland	WJC	2nd place, silver medalist(s)	7	3	7	10	2
2026	Finland	WC	1st place, gold medalist(s)	10	4	3	7	10
Junior totals				30	10	10	20	14
Senior totals				10	4	3	7	10

== Awards and honours ==
Award	Year	Ref
AHL
Calder Cup champion	2025	
