= Dach (surname) =

Dach (literally "roof" in the Polish and German language) is a Polish and German topographical surname for a settler on clay soil and may refer to:

- Carson Dach (born 1980), American football player
- Colton Dach (born 2003), Canadian ice hockey player
- Hans von Dach (1927–2003), Swiss military theorist
- Kirby Dach (born 2001), Canadian ice hockey player
- Leslie Dach, American businessman
- Lorne Dach (born 1958), Canadian politician
- Simon Dach (1605–1659), Prussian lyrical poet and hymnwriter

== See also ==
- Dach (disambiguation)
