= Adam Raška (ice hockey, born 2001) =

Czech ice hockey player (born 2001)

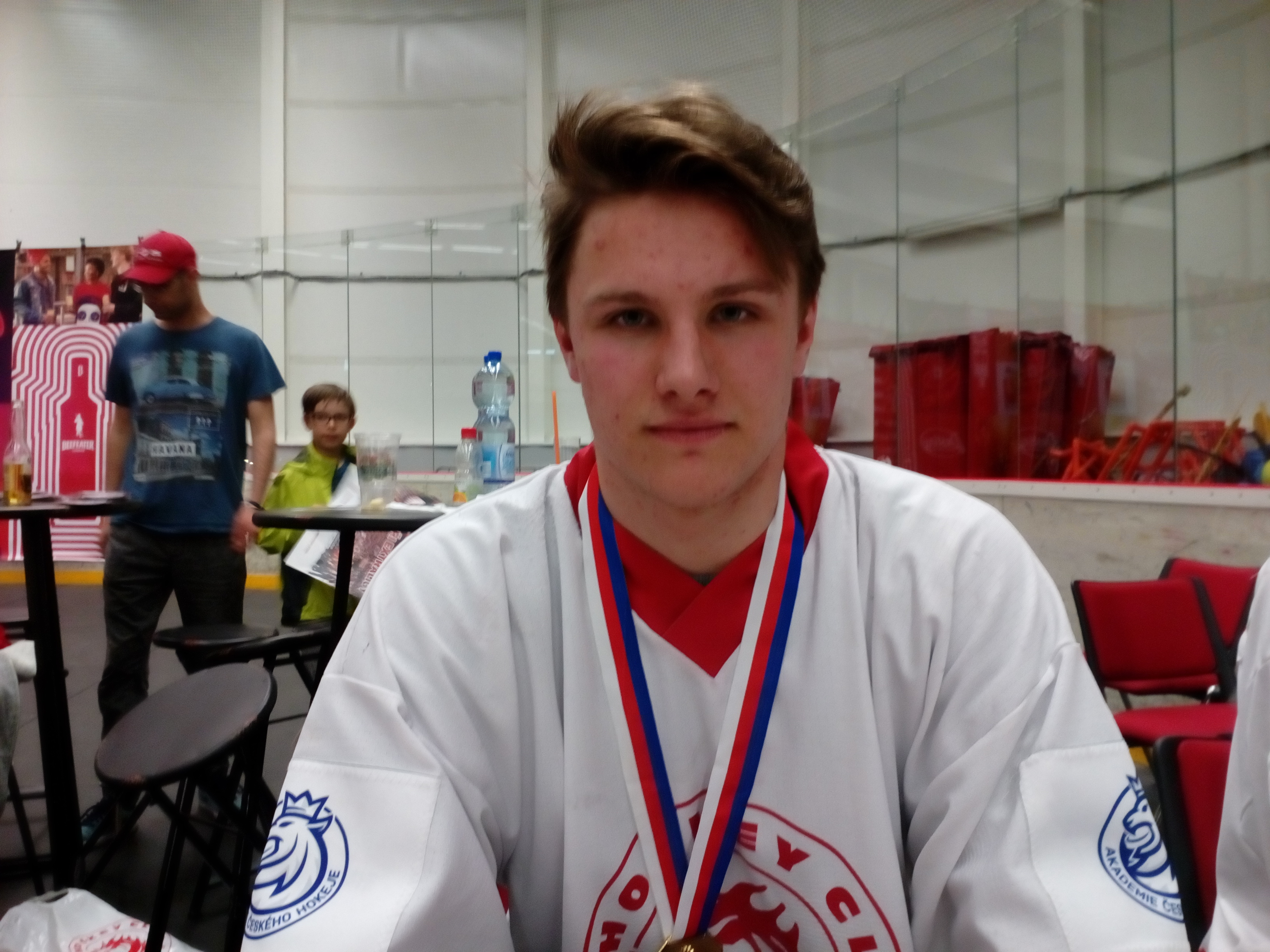
- Born: 25 September 2001 (age 24) Kopřivnice, Czech Republic
- Height: 5 ft 10 in (178 cm)
- Weight: 178 lb (81 kg; 12 st 10 lb)
- Position: Right wing
- Shoots: Right
- ELH team Former teams: HC Sparta Praha; HC Oceláři Třinec; San Jose Sharks; Minnesota Wild
- NHL draft: 201st overall, 2020; San Jose Sharks
- Playing career: 2017–present

Adam Raška (born 25 September 2001) is a Czech professional ice hockey player for HC Sparta Praha of the Czech Extraliga (ELH). He has formerly played in the National Hockey League (NHL) with the San Jose Sharks and Minnesota Wild.

== Playing career ==
Raška was drafted by the San Jose Sharks in the 2020 NHL entry draft. He signed an entry-level contract with the Sharks on 12 May 2021 and made his NHL debut on 11 January 2022, in a 3–2 win over the Detroit Red Wings.

In November 2023, he was traded to the Minnesota Wild along with a 2026 fifth-round pick in exchange for Calen Addison.

Having concluded his contract with the Wild following the 2024–25 season, Raška returned to his native Czech Republic as a free agent and was signed to a two-year contract with HC Sparta Praha of the ELH on 19 August 2025.

== Career statistics ==
=== Regular season and playoffs ===
			Regular season					Playoffs
Season	Team	League	GP	G	A	Pts	PIM	GP	G	A	Pts	PIM
2017–18	HC Oceláři Třinec	Czech.20	33	16	16	32	51	—	—	—	—	—
2017–18	HC Oceláři Třinec	ELH	2	0	0	0	0	—	—	—	—	—
2017–18	HC Frýdek-Místek	Czech.1	13	2	1	3	14	—	—	—	—	—
2018–19	HC Oceláři Třinec	ELH	7	1	0	1	2	—	—	—	—	—
2018–19	HC Frýdek-Místek	Czech.1	25	3	2	5	55	—	—	—	—	—
2019–20	Rimouski Océanic	QMJHL	63	34	23	57	32	5	3	2	5	2
2020–21	HC Oceláři Třinec	ELH	2	0	0	0	0	—	—	—	—	—
2020–21	HC Frýdek-Místek	Czech.1	11	0	1	1	12	—	—	—	—	—
2020–21	Rimouski Océanic	QMJHL	22	12	13	25	30	8	3	3	6	18
2021–22	San Jose Barracuda	AHL	49	5	9	14	57	—	—	—	—	—
2021–22	San Jose Sharks	NHL	5	0	0	0	7	—	—	—	—	—
2022–23	San Jose Barracuda	AHL	54	4	7	11	121	—	—	—	—	—
2022–23	San Jose Sharks	NHL	3	0	0	0	0	—	—	—	—	—
2023–24	San Jose Barracuda	AHL	7	0	0	0	4	—	—	—	—	—
2023–24	Iowa Wild	AHL	49	3	4	7	94	—	—	—	—	—
2023–24	Minnesota Wild	NHL	5	0	0	0	0	—	—	—	—	—
2024–25	Iowa Wild	AHL	56	5	9	14	83	—	—	—	—	—
ELH totals			11	1	0	1	2	—	—	—	—	—
NHL totals			13	0	0	0	7	—	—	—	—	—

=== International ===
Year	Team	Event	Result	GP	G	A	Pts	PIM
2018	Czech Republic	HG18	5th	4	0	3	3	16
2019	Czech Republic	U18	6th	5	1	1	2	4
2020	Czech Republic	WJC	7th	5	0	0	0	0
2021	Czech Republic	WJC	7th	4	0	1	1	6
Junior totals				18	1	5	6	26
