= Graeme Clarke =

Canadian ice hockey player (born 2001)

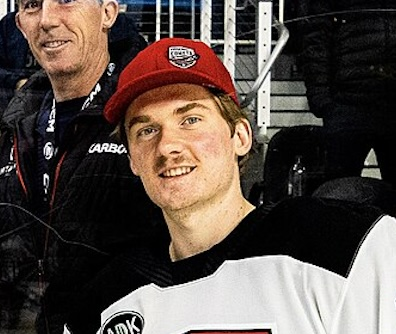
- Clarke with the Utica Comets in 2024
- Born: April 24, 2001 (age 25) Waconia, Minnesota, U.S.
- Height: 6 ft 0 in (183 cm)
- Weight: 175 lb (79 kg; 12 st 7 lb)
- Position: Winger
- Shoots: Right
- SHL team Former teams: Frölunda HC: HC Nové Zámky; New Jersey Devils; Hershey Bears; Belleville Senators
- NHL draft: 80th overall, 2019; New Jersey Devils
- Playing career: 2020–present

Graeme Clarke (born April 24, 2001) is an American-born Canadian professional ice hockey winger for Frölunda HC. He most recently played for the Belleville Senators of the American Hockey League (AHL) while under contract to the Ottawa Senators of the National Hockey League (NHL). He was selected by the New Jersey Devils in the third round, 80th overall, of the 2019 NHL entry draft.

== Playing career ==
=== Amateur ===
Clarke was selected sixth overall by the Ottawa 67's in the Ontario Hockey League (OHL)'s 2017 Priority Selection draft. He made his OHL debut in the following 2017–18 season. On January 21, 2018, he scored a Michigan goal against the Peterborough Petes, a move he had done successfully multiple times prior to his OHL career. He finished the year with 14 goals and 11 assists for 25 points in 63 games. The 67's qualified for the playoffs and faced the Hamilton Bulldogs in the opening round. The Bulldogs eliminated the 67's in five games. Clarke went scoreless in the series. Returning to the 67's for the 2018–19 season, Clarke scored his second Michigan goal at the OHL level on March 8, 2019. His regular season production increased from the previous year's, netting 23 goals and 34 points in 55 games. The 67's advanced to the OHL final, ultimately losing to the Guelph Storm. In the playoffs he added seven goals and 14 points in 18 playoff games. Despite missing all but 16 games of the 2019–20 season due to a shoulder injury, Clarke still managed nine goals and 17 points before the season was stopped due to the COVID-19 pandemic in March 2020.

=== Professional ===
Clarke was selected by the New Jersey Devils of the National Hockey League (NHL) in the third round, 80th overall, of the 2019 NHL entry draft. With the 2020–21 OHL season postponed and later cancelled due to the pandemic, Clarke and his brother, Brandt, began the season with HC Nové Zámky of the Slovak Extraliga. On February 8, 2021, after six games in Slovakia over which he totaled just one assist, he signed a one-year American Hockey League (AHL) contract with the Binghamton Devils, then-affiliate of the New Jersey Devils. He would sign a three-year, entry-level contract with New Jersey less than a month later, on March 6. In 31 AHL games with Binghamton, Clarke scored eight goals and 18 points.

Clarke was assigned to the Devils' new AHL affiliate, the Utica Comets, for the entirety of the 2021–22 season, scoring ten goals and 24 points in 52 regular season games, as well as one point in three playoff games as the Comets received a bye to the second round, where they were eliminated by the Rochester Americans. The 2022–23 season saw Clarke more than double his previous year's point production, totaling 25 goals and 58 points in 68 games, leading the team in all offensive categories. He was named AHL player of the week for the week ending on December 25, 2022, during which he scored four goals and six points in two games. In the playoffs, Clarke put up six points in as many games, as the Comets were once again eliminated in the second round, this time by the Toronto Marlies.

He began the 2023–24 season with Utica, but was recalled by New Jersey on January 3, 2024. Clarke made his NHL debut on January 6, in a 6–4 loss against the Vancouver Canucks. He was returned to the AHL on January 7. He and Brandt were both selected for the 2024 AHL All-Star Game, the second pair of brothers to attend the game together after Peter and Chris Ferraro in 1997 and 2003. He was recalled again in April and made two more appearances going scoreless, before being returned to the AHL. He finished the AHL season with 25 goals and 49 points in 67 games, including eight game-winning goals to lead the Comets in goals and game-winners, and rank second in points.

On June 21, 2024, Clarke was traded to the Minnesota Wild in exchange for forward Adam Beckman. A restricted free agent, he signed a one-year, two-way contract with the Wild. He began the 2024–25 season injured after blocking a shot with his lower body in training camp. He was activated on October 29 and placed on waivers in order to be assigned to Minnesota's AHL affiliate, the Iowa Wild. After going unclaimed, he spent the rest of the season in Iowa, tallying 16 goals and 37 points in 64 games.

As an unrestricted free agent at the conclusion of his contract with the Wild, Clarke was signed to a one-year, two-way contract by the Washington Capitals on July 2, 2025. On October 1, Clarke was placed on waivers. After going unclaimed, he was assigned to Washington's AHL affiliate, the Hershey Bears. He put up 15 goals and 24 points in 50 games with Hershey.

On March 6, 2026, Clarke was traded to the Ottawa Senators, in exchange for forward Wyatt Bongiovanni. In 15 games with Belleville, he tallied five goals and 19 points.

On September 7, 2026, Clarke signed as a free agent with Frölunda HC of the Swedish Hockey League.

== International play ==
Medal record

Representing Canada

Men's ice hockey

Hlinka Gretzky Cup
| Gold medal – first place | 2018 Edmonton/Red Deer | |

Clarke represented Canada at the 2018 Hlinka Gretzky Cup, scoring three points in five games en route to a gold medal. In December 2025, Clarke was named to Team Canada for the 2025 Spengler Cup. The team was eliminated in the tournament's quarterfinals by HC Sparta Praha on December 29.

== Personal life ==
Clarke was born in Waconia, Minnesota to Canadian parents who were each earning their Masters' degrees at the University of Minnesota School of Dentistry. He grew up in Ottawa and has two ice hockey-playing younger siblings, both defencemen. His brother Brandt plays for the Los Angeles Kings, while his sister Mackenzie plays for St. Lawrence University.

== Career statistics ==
=== Regular season and playoffs ===
| | | | Regular season | | | | | Playoffs |
| Season | Team | League | GP | G | A | Pts | PIM | GP | G | A | Pts | PIM |
|---|---|---|---|---|---|---|---|---|---|---|---|---|
| 2017–18 | Ottawa 67's | OHL | 63 | 14 | 11 | 25 | 26 | 5 | 0 | 0 | 0 | 0 |
| 2018–19 | Ottawa 67's | OHL | 55 | 23 | 11 | 34 | 34 | 18 | 7 | 7 | 14 | 10 |
| 2019–20 | Ottawa 67's | OHL | 16 | 9 | 8 | 17 | 6 | — | — | — | — | — |
| 2020–21 | HC Nové Zámky | Slovak | 6 | 0 | 1 | 1 | 6 | — | — | — | — | — |
| 2020–21 | Binghamton Devils | AHL | 31 | 8 | 10 | 18 | 12 | — | — | — | — | — |
| 2021–22 | Utica Comets | AHL | 52 | 10 | 14 | 24 | 30 | 3 | 1 | 0 | 1 | 0 |
| 2022–23 | Utica Comets | AHL | 68 | 25 | 33 | 58 | 18 | 6 | 2 | 4 | 6 | 4 |
| 2023–24 | Utica Comets | AHL | 67 | 25 | 24 | 49 | 30 | — | — | — | — | — |
| 2023–24 | New Jersey Devils | NHL | 3 | 0 | 0 | 0 | 2 | — | — | — | — | — |
| 2024–25 | Iowa Wild | AHL | 64 | 16 | 21 | 37 | 36 | — | — | — | — | — |
| 2025–26 | Hershey Bears | AHL | 50 | 15 | 9 | 24 | 24 | — | — | — | — | — |
| 2025–26 | Belleville Senators | AHL | 15 | 5 | 14 | 19 | 18 | — | — | — | — | — |
| NHL totals | | | 3 | 0 | 0 | 0 | 2 | — | — | — | — | — |

=== International ===
| Year | Team | Event | Result | GP | G | A | Pts | PIM |
|---|---|---|---|---|---|---|---|---|
| 2018 | Canada | HG18 | 1st place, gold medalist(s) | 5 | 2 | 1 | 3 | 0 |
| Junior totals | | | | 5 | 2 | 1 | 3 | 0 |

== Awards and honours ==
| Award | Year | Ref |
AHL
| AHL All-Star Game | 2024 | |
Utica Comets
| Three Stars Award | 2024 | |
