= 2018 Hlinka Gretzky Cup =

Tournament details
- Host country: Canada
- Venue(s): 2 (in 2 host cities)
- Dates: August 6–11, 2018
- Teams: 8

Final positions
- Champions: Canada (22nd title)
- Runners-up: Sweden
- Third place: Russia
- Fourth place: United States

Tournament statistics
- Games played: 18
- Goals scored: 138 (7.67 per game)
- Attendance: 35,000 (1,944 per game)
- Scoring leader(s): (Canada) Alexis Lafrenière (5 goals, 6 assists) (Russia) Vasili Podkolzin (8 goals, 3 assists)

Official website
- hlinkagretzky.com

The 2018 Hlinka Gretzky Cup (branded as the 2018 Hlinka Gretzky Cup presented by Ram for sponsorship reasons) was an under-18 international ice hockey tournament held in Edmonton and Red Deer, Alberta, Canada from August 6–11, 2018 at Rogers Place in Edmonton and Servus Arena in Red Deer.

== Preliminary round ==
All times are Mountain Daylight Time (UTC-6).

=== Group A ===
Pos	Team	Pld	W	OTW	OTL	L	GF	GA	GD	Pts	Qualification
1	Canada (H)	3	3	0	0	0	18	5	+13	9	Semifinals
2	Sweden	3	2	0	0	1	12	6	+6	6	Semifinals
3	Slovakia	3	1	0	0	2	9	11	−2	3	Fifth place game
4	Switzerland	3	0	0	0	3	3	20	−17	0	Seventh place game

Source: hlinkagretzky.com
(H) Host

August 6; 15:00	Slovakia	2–4 (1–1, 1–1, 0–2)	Sweden	Rogers Place, Edmonton; Attendance: 713

Game reference

Patrik Kozel
Goalies
Jesper Wallstedt

Valigura (Čajkovič) – 00:43	1–0
	1–1	09:53 – Grewe (Bjerselius, Åström) (PP)
	1–2	20:53 – Broberg (Raymond, Holtz)
Turan (Sojka) (PP) – 34:32	2–2
	2–3	41:56 – Henriksson (Holtz, Söderström) (PP)
	2–4	45:27 – Broberg

8 min
Penalties
16 min
21
Shots
44

August 6; 19:00	Switzerland	0–10 (0–3, 0–5, 0–2)	Canada	Rogers Place, Edmonton; Attendance: 5,922

Game reference

Sascha Ruppelt
Thibault Fatton
Goalies
Nolan Maier

0–1	04:49 – Clarke (Guenette, Robertson)
0–2	06:29 – Suzuki (Barron, Cozens) (PP)
0–3	15:24 – Pelletier (Mutala, Holloway)
0–4	24:07 – Cozens (Suzuki, Barron) (PP)
0–5	29:51 – Parent (Lafrenière, Clarke) (PP)
0–6	30:34 – Robertson (Poulin, Krebs)
0–7	31:52 – Guenette (Mutala, Pelletier)
0–8	33:15 – Krebs (Dach, Lafrenière)
0–9	41:38 – Dach (Suzuki) (SH)
0–10	58:35 – Krebs (Robertson, Korczak)

10 min
Penalties
8 min
15
Shots
48

August 7; 15:00	Switzerland	0–5 (0–1, 0–0, 0–4)	Sweden	Rogers Place, Edmonton; Attendance: 428

Game reference

Thibault Fatton
Goalies
Hugo Alnefelt

0–1	16:39 – Broberg
0–2	42:13 – Hedström
0–3	47:16 – Raymond (SH)
0–4	55:46 – Söderström (Grewe, Bjerselius)
0–5	56:12 – Raymond

1 min
Penalties
6 min
15
Shots
36

August 7; 19:00	Slovakia	2–4 (0–0, 0–2, 2–2)	Canada	Rogers Place, Edmonton; Attendance: 2,142

Game reference

Dávid Borák
Goalies
Taylor Gauthier

	0–1	21:23 – Lafrenière (Barron, Krebs)
	0–2	36:51 – Holloway (Williams, Barron)
	0–3	41:18 – Clarke (Dach, Lafrenière) (PP)
Golian (Turan, Mrázik) – 45:33	1–3
Turanský (Čajkovič, Ilenčík) (PP) – 49:32	2–3
	2–4	52:12 – Williams (Rees, Suzuki)

8 min
Penalties
8 min
19
Shots
58

August 8; 15:00	Switzerland	3–5 (0–1, 1–1, 2–3)	Slovakia	Rogers Place, Edmonton

Game reference

Sascha Ruppelt
Goalies
Patrik Kozel

	0–1	12:47 – Jendek (Eliáš)
Fiedler (Schwenninger) – 21:20	1–1
	1–2	35:22 – Čajkovič (Turanský, Ilenčík)
Knak (Baragano, Rochette) (PP) – 44:46	2–2
Knak (Stoffel, Rochette) – 52:16	3–2
	3–3	52:50 – Mrázik (Chromiak)
	3–4	56:55 – Chromiak (Sojka, Mrázik)
	3–5	59:15 – Mrázik (Chromiak) (EN)

6 min
Penalties
8 min
29
Shots
33

August 8; 19:00	Sweden	3–4 (1–1, 0–1, 2–2)	Canada	Rogers Place, Edmonton

Game reference

Jesper Wallstedt
Goalies
Nolan Maier

Raymond (Holtz, Söderblom) (PP) – 13:37	1–0
	1–1	15:34 – Williams (Suzuki, Korczak)
	1–2	32:51 – Lafrenière (Barron, Dach)
Holtz (Raymond) – 47:58	2–2
	2–3	53:09 – Robertson (Suzuki, Rees)
Söderblom (Björnfot, Holtz) (PP) – 55:44	3–3
	3–4	57:34 – Byram (Lafrenière, Dach) (PP)

8 min
Penalties
12 min
21
Shots
35

=== Group B ===
Pos	Team	Pld	W	OTW	OTL	L	GF	GA	GD	Pts	Qualification
1	Russia	3	3	0	0	0	18	5	+13	9	Semifinals
2	United States	3	2	0	0	1	15	10	+5	6	Semifinals
3	Czech Republic	3	0	1	0	2	4	12	−8	2	Fifth place game
4	Finland	3	0	0	1	2	7	17	−10	1	Seventh place game

Source: hlinkagretzky.com

August 6; 15:00	Russia	7–2 (1–1, 4–0, 2–1)	Finland	Servus Arena, Red Deer; Attendance: 732

Game reference

Vladimir Sartakov
Goalies
Roope Taponen

	0–1	00:53 – Puistola (Simontaival)
Vashchenko (Podkolzin, Nikolayev) – 13:51	1–1
Gritsyuk (Chinakhov) – 20:07	2–1
Gushchin (Likachyov, Abramov) – 22:52	3–1
Podkolzin (Nikolayev) – 28:20	4–1
Mironov (Podkolzin, Gutik) (PP) – 30:21	5–1
Gritsyuk (Chinakhov) (PP) – 40:53	6–1
	6–2	51:17 – Intonen (Heinola, Räty)
Zaitsev (Alkhimov, Amirov) (PP) – 54:10	7–2

2 min
Penalties
22 min
60
Shots
26

August 6; 19:00	Czech Republic	0–6 (0–1, 0–3, 0–2)	United States	Servus Arena, Red Deer; Attendance: 819

Game reference

Nick Malík
Jan Škorpík
Goalies
Dustin Wolf

0–1	9:04 – Mastrosimone (Silianoff, Koster) (PP)
0–2	31:19 – Mastrosimone (Silianoff, Miller)
0–3	33:24 – Jutting (Silianoff, Webber) (SH)
0–4	35:41 – Huglen (Nodler, Wolf)
0–5	42:37 – Silianoff (Farinacci)
0–6	58:22 – Toporowski (Nodler) (SH)

22 min
Penalties
24 min
23
Shots
40

August 7; 15:00	Czech Republic	0–3 (0–2, 0–0, 0–1)	Russia	Servus Arena, Red Deer; Attendance: 734

Game reference

Nick Malík
Goalies
Yaroslav Askarov

0–1	10:47 – Chinakhov (Gritsyuk, Sedov) (PP)
0–2	18:39 – Likhachyov (Abramov, Gushchin)
0–3	51:53 – Podkolzin (Nikolayev, Gutik)

22 min
Penalties
18 min
35
Shots
26

August 7; 19:00	Finland	2–6 (1–2, 1–1, 0–3)	United States	Servus Arena, Red Deer; Attendance: 853

Game reference

Roope Taponen
Goalies
Dustin Wolf

	0–1	09:53 – Toporowski (Feenstra, Jutting)
	0–2	18:17 – Colangelo (Reid, Webber)
Räty (Loponen, Lundell) – 18:36	1–2
	1–3	21:30 – Kaliyev (Robertson, Nodler)
Lundell (Aaltonen, Miettinen) (PP) – 24:59	2–3
	2–4	45:13 – Farinacci (Mastrosimone)
	2–5	45:30 – Jutting (Toporowski, Groll)
	2–6	56:29 – Toporowski (Miller) (SH)

26 min
Penalties
16 min
31
Shots
39

August 8; 15:00	Czech Republic	4–3 OT (1–1, 1–0, 1–2); OT: (1–0)	Finland	Servus Arena, Red Deer

Game reference

Nick Malík
Goalies
Kari Piironen

Haš (Raška, Barinka) – 6:09	1–0
	1–1	19:02 – Miettinen (Aaltonen, Kokkonen) (PP)
Beránek (Pytlik, Homola) – 33:00	2–1
	2–2	47:43 – Kokkonen (Loponen, Simontaival)
Mužík (Pytlik, Peterek) (PP) – 49:48	3–2
	3–3	50:54 – Pärssinen (Heinola, Piiroinen)
Teplý (Barinka, Haš) (PP) – 61:09	4–3

4 min
Penalties
10 min
42
Shots
29

August 8; 19:00	United States	3–8 (0–3, 3–1, 0–4)	Russia	Servus Arena, Red Deer

Game reference

Derek Mullahy
Goalies
Yaroslav Askarov

	0–1	12:18 – Gushchin (Likhachyov, Abramov)
	0–2	16:45 – Likhachyov (Abramov, Gushchin)
	0–3	18:26 – Mironov (Nikolayev, Amirov)
Mastrosimone (Miller) – 22:08	1–3
Kaliyev (Mancinelli, Nodler) (PP) – 23:16	2–3
Colangelo (Reid, Farinacci) (PP) – 28:33	3–3
	3–4	37:33 – Podkolzin (Gutik, Nikolayev)
	3–5	41:38 – Gushchin (Likhachyov, Burenov)
	3–6	48:54 – Abramov (Likhachyov)
	3–7	51:32 – Podkolzin (Mironov)
	3–8	59:15 – Bychkov (Abramov, Gushchin) (PP)

12 min
Penalties
16 min
19
Shots
55

== Final round ==
=== Seventh place game ===
August 10; 12:00	Switzerland	2–8 (1–5, 1–3, 0–0)	Finland

Game reference

Thibault Fatton
Sascha Ruppelt
Goalies
Kari Piiroinen

Andersson (Bardh) – 5:19	1–0
	1–1	07:06 – Kokkonen (Nikkanen, Puistola)
	1–2	12:58 – Nikkanen (Simontaival)
	1–3	13:19 – Puistola (Simontaival, Nikkanen)
	1–4	15:50 – Nikkanen (Simontaival, Puistola)
	1–5	18:47 – Puistola (Nikkanen, Simontaival)
	1–6	29:06 – Miettinen (Loponen)
	1–7	30:49 – Puistola (Nikkanen, Simontaival) (PP)
Stoffel – 35:54	2–7
	2–8	38:04 – Räty (Lahnaviik)

18 min
Penalties
10 min
22
Shots
45

=== Fifth place game ===
August 10; 16:00	Slovakia	3–8 (1–1, 1–3, 1–4)	Czech Republic

Game reference

Dávid Borák
Goalies
Jan Škorpík

	0–1	00:56 – Barinka (Haš) (PP)
Mrázik (Turan, Golian) – 1:37	1–1
	1–2	21:19 – Přikryl
Čajkovič (Kňažko) (PP) – 26:26	2–2
	2–3	34:06 – Peterek (Koffer, Mlčák)
	2–4	37:20 – Najman (Teplý, Barinka) (PP)
	2–5	43:11 – Barinka (Raška)
Chromiak (Kňažko, Mrázik) – 46:42	3–5
	3–6	47:27 – Najman (Novák)
	3–7	48:46 – Barinka (Teplý, Raška)
	3–8	51:51 – Lang (Prikryl, Teplý)

12 min
Penalties
10 min
28
Shots
58

=== Semifinals ===
August 10; 15:00	Russia	1–2 (0–0, 0–0, 1–2)	Sweden	Rogers Place, Edmonton

Game reference

Yaroslav Askarov
Goalies
Hugo Alnefelt

	0–1	45:16 – Broberg (Bjerselius, Costmar) (PP)
Podkolzin – 58:06	1–1
	1–2	59:16 – Henriksson (Raymond)

6 min
Penalties
12 min
35
Shots
19

August 10; 19:00	United States	5–6 OT (3–2, 0–1, 2–2); OT: (0–1)	Canada	Rogers Place, Edmonton

Game reference

Dustin Wolf
Goalies
Nolan Maier

Robertson (Nodler, Koster) (PP) – 03:20	1–0
	1–1	04:39 – Lafrenière (Parent, Byram)
Huglen (Kaliyev, Mancinelli) – 05:48	2–1
	2–2	08:10 – Rees
Robertson (Nodler) – 14:33	3–2
	3–3	28:34 – Parent (Lafrenière, Dach) (PP)
	3–4	43:31 – Williams (Suzuki) (PP)
Robertson (Kaliyev) – 51:58	4–4
Toporowski (Groll) – 53:33	5–4
	5–5	59:59 – Cozens (Byram, Korczak)
	5–6	61:44 – Williams (Krebs)

8 min
Penalties
8 min
39
Shots
34

Canada's game-tying goal was considered controversial, as video footage suggested that the goal had been scored after time officially expired. However, as the tournament did not officially use video review, referees allowed the goal to stand.

=== Bronze medal game ===
August 11; 15:00	Russia	5–4 (0–0, 2–0, 3–4)	United States	Rogers Place, Edmonton

Game reference

Yaroslav Askarov
Goalies
Derek Mullahy

Likhachyov (Abramov, Spiridonov) (PP) – 25:39	1–0
Podkolzin (Gutik) (PP) – 26:21	2–0
	2–1	43:27 – Farinacci (Silianoff) (PP)
Podkolzin (Nikolayev) (PP) – 45:44	3–1
	3–2	53:53 Kaliyev (Mancinelli, Miller) (PP)
Podkolzin (Mironov) – 54:15	4–2
	4–3	57:28 Robertson (Farinacci, Kaliyev) (PP)
Nikolayev (Podkolzin) – 58:22	5–3
	5–4	59:42 – Nodler (Miller, Mastrosimone)

14 min
Penalties
10 min
35
Shots
30

=== Final ===
August 11; 19:00	Sweden	2–6 (2–3, 0–1, 0–2)	Canada	Rogers Place, Edmonton

Game reference

Hugo Alnefelt
Goalies
Taylor Gauthier
Nolan Maier

Raymond (Holtz) (PP) – 00:42	1–0
Holtz (Söderblom) – 11:33	2–0
	2–1	12:14 – Mutala (Byram, Cozens)
	2–2	14:35 – Dach (Lafrenière)
	2–3	17:54 – Lafrenière
	2–4	32:12 – Mutala (Holloway, Cozens)
	2–5	45:00 – Williams (Suzuki, Rees)
	2–6	53:54 – Lafrenière (PP)

10 min
Penalties
14 min
19
Shots
40

== Final standings ==
Rank	Team
1st place, gold medalist(s)	Canada
2nd place, silver medalist(s)	Sweden
3rd place, bronze medalist(s)	Russia
4	United States
5	Czech Republic
6	Slovakia
7	Finland
8	Switzerland
