= Kirby Dach =

Canadian ice hockey player (born 2001)

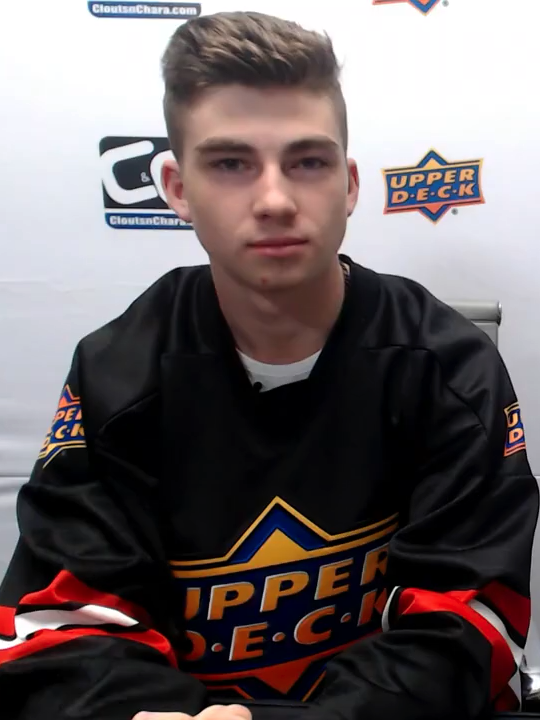
- Dach in 2019
- Born: January 21, 2001 (age 25) Fort Saskatchewan, Alberta, Canada
- Height: 6 ft 4 in (193 cm)
- Weight: 221 lb (100 kg; 15 st 11 lb)
- Position: Centre
- Shoots: Right
- NHL team Former teams: Montreal Canadiens; Chicago Blackhawks
- NHL draft: 3rd overall, 2019; Chicago Blackhawks
- Playing career: 2019–present

Kirby Dach (born January 21, 2001) is a Canadian professional ice hockey player who is a centre for the Montreal Canadiens of the National Hockey League (NHL). He was selected in the first round, third overall, by the Chicago Blackhawks in the 2019 NHL entry draft.

== Early life ==
Born in Fort Saskatchewan, Alberta to parents Dale and Hillary, Dach began playing ice hockey around the age of five, practicing in a backyard rink and on Garner Lake near his family's cabin. A childhood fan of the Edmonton Oilers of the National Hockey League (NHL), he would frequently attend games at Rexall Place with his father. Dach often played minor ice hockey above his age level, including his time as part of the Fort Saskatchewan Rangers of the Alberta Midget Hockey League (AMHL). At age 13, he recorded 100 points in 33 games, breaking Tyler Benson's 84-point league record.

== Playing career ==
=== Junior ===
Selected second overall by the Saskatoon Blades of the Western Hockey League (WHL) in the 2016 bantam draft, Dach immediately signed with the team thereafter. Following a series of mid-season injuries to the team's forward core, the Blades received permission to promote Dach, an underage player, for the remainder of the 2016–17 season. On February 10, 2017, he scored his first major junior goal in a game against the Moose Jaw Warriors. Collectively, Dach appeared in 19 games for the Blades that season, scoring six goals and 10 points in that span. He joined the Blades on a full-time basis for the 2017–18 season, recording seven goals and 39 assists in 52 games played.

In January 2019, Dach was named as an alternate captain for the Blades for the remainder of the 2018–19 season. He was likewise named captain for Team Orr at the CHL/NHL Top Prospects Game, where he recorded an assist. Dach ultimately finished the WHL season with 25 goals and 48 assists in 62 games and ranked third amongst North American skaters by NHL Central Scouting Services (CSS) for the 2019 NHL entry draft. After being selected third overall by the Chicago Blackhawks, he signed a three-year, entry-level contract with the team that July.

=== Professional ===
==== Chicago Blackhawks (2019–2022) ====
Dach began his professional career early into the 2019–20 season, making his NHL debut against the Washington Capitals on October 20, 2019. A few days later, he scored his first NHL goal against Marc-André Fleury of the Vegas Golden Knights in a 2–1 loss on October 22. Prior to the season's premature end due to the COVID-19 pandemic, Dach finished with eight goals and 15 assists in 64 games. His point production was comparable to that of Jack Hughes and Kaapo Kakko, being the predecessor picks from his draft class.

With the 2020 Stanley Cup playoffs being reorganized to be held in a bubble format in the cities of Edmonton and Toronto, Dach rejoined the Blackhawks for their qualifying round matchup versus the Edmonton Oilers, with the foregoing being considered series favourites. However, the Blackhawks ultimately staged an upset, ousting the Oilers three games to one in a best-of-five. Dach was widely credited as being one of the team's best players during the series, recording four assists in the first three games. He scored his first career playoff goal on August 13 versus the Vegas Golden Knights and became just the sixth teenaged player to score a playoff goal for the Blackhawks, and the first to do so since Jeremy Roenick in 1989. Eliminated by the Golden Knights in five games, Dach finished the playoffs with one goal and five assists across nine games.

After sustaining an injury to his wrist during the 2021 World Junior Ice Hockey Championships, Dach subsequently missed much of the pandemic-shortened 2020–21 NHL season. He rejoined the Blackhawks on March 27, 2021, appearing in 18 total games (tallying two goals and eight assists) before reaggravating his wrist injury.

The following 2021–22 season was a struggle for both Dach personally as well as the Blackhawks overall, prompting wholesale management turnover for the latter. For his part, Dach managed only nine goals and 17 assists in 70 games, while also facing struggles in the faceoff circle. Many observers considered it a poor sign that he was unable to generate offensively despite pairing with high caliber linemates such as Alex DeBrincat and Patrick Kane, while also noting that the Blackhawks' organizational depth had likely "pushed Dach into a role he was not even close to ready for." With new team general manager Kyle Davidson initiating a rebuild, there were discussions of trading Dach elsewhere.

==== Montreal Canadiens (2022–present) ====
During the course of the 2022 NHL entry draft, Dach was traded by the Blackhawks to the Montreal Canadiens in exchange for the ensuing 13th overall pick as well as a third-round selection. Initially moving defenceman Alexander Romanov to the New York Islanders in order to acquire the higher pick to make said trade, Canadiens general manager Kent Hughes stated that he believed Dach could live up to his potential despite his struggles in preceding seasons.

On September 7, 2022, Dach signed a four-year, $13.45 million extension with the Canadiens. He scored his first goal with the team on October 17, giving them a 3–2 victory over the Pittsburgh Penguins in overtime. Following the game, Dach said that he "felt like I got a couple of opportunities in previous games to get my first one. But no better feeling than getting your first one on a new team at home." Though the Canadiens had initially acquired Dach to play at the centre position, he was experimentally moved to the wing on the top line with Nick Suzuki and Cole Caufield whereas the configuration garnered strong initial results. He credited head coach Martin St. Louis for having allowed him "to go out and have fun again, enjoy the game of hockey." In his first game back at the United Center in Chicago following the aforementioned trade, he scored the decisive shootout goal, giving the Canadiens a 3–2 win over his former team. Dach was eventually moved back to centre by midseason, following an injury to teammate Sean Monahan. Despite his own play being limited to just 58 games after injuries sustained in both February and March 2023, Dach nonetheless managed to set a new career high of 38 points.

Entering the 2023–24 season with high expectations, Dach was given two new wingers in Juraj Slafkovský, the Canadiens' first overall selection in 2022, and fellow 2019 draftee Alex Newhook, newly acquired from the Colorado Avalanche via trade. The trio performed strongly in their first game together, with Dach recording two assists. However, on October 14, Dach exited early on into just the second game of the season after being checked into the boards by Blackhawks defenceman Jarred Tinordi. It was later reported that he had torn both his anterior cruciate ligament (ACL) and medial collateral ligament (MCL), and required season-ending surgery.

In the opening game of the 2024–25 season versus the Toronto Maple Leafs, Dach registered his 100th career NHL point. After posting 22 points through 57 games, it was announced on February 28, 2025 that he had undergone surgery to his right knee, bringing his season to a premature end.

Collecting seven points (five goals, two assists) through his team's first 15 games of the 2025–26 season, Dach suffered a fractured foot during a game against the Boston Bruins on November 15. Thereafter, it was announced that he was expected to miss four to six weeks of action. He returned after missing 31 games, but would miss a further 11 games after an upper body injury in March. He ultimately appeared in 37 games in the regular season, with eight goals and seven assists, and saw his usage diminish over time. With the Canadiens qualifying to the 2026 Stanley Cup playoffs and playing the Tampa Bay Lightning in the first round, Dach saw his first postseason action since 2020. After making multiple errors leading to Lightning defender J. J. Moser's overtime-winning goal in game 2 of the series, Dach and his girlfriend were subject to significant social media harassment, drawing headlines. Despite speculation that he might be scratched from the roster, coach St. Louis retained Dach in the lineup for game 3. Dach had a goal and an assist in the 3–2 victory, with his line with Alexandre Texier and Zachary Bolduc contributing to all three Canadiens goals.

== International play ==
Medal record

Representing Canada

Men's ice hockey

World Junior Championships
Silver medal – second place	2021 Canada	

Hlinka Gretzky Cup
Gold medal – first place	2018 Canada	

Dach first represented Hockey Canada as part of Team Alberta at the 2016 Western Canada U16 Challenge Cup, winning a gold medal. The following year, he was named to team Canada Black for the World U-17 Hockey Challenge, where his team ultimately finished in seventh place. For his part, Dach finished tournament play with seven points registered across five games.

In August 2018, Dach participated in the annual Hlinka Gretzky Cup where he totaled two goals and five assists. In the gold medal game versus the Swedish national under-18 team, he scored a first period goal, helping lead Canada to a 6–2 victory.

After being loaned by the Blackhawks to the Canadian national junior team for the 2021 World Junior Ice Hockey Championships, Dach was named as team captain. On December 23, in a pre-tournament game played against the Russian national junior team, Dach bumped into opposing forward Ilya Safonov, injuring himself, and was forced to leave the game as a result. X-ray imaging later confirmed he sustained a fracture in his wrist, sidelining him for the remainder of the tournament. During Dach's absence, Canada would earn a silver medal following a 2–0 shutout loss to Team USA in the final.

== Personal life ==
Dach's younger brother, Colton, was selected by the Chicago Blackhawks in the second round (62nd overall) of the 2021 NHL entry draft. According to his sibling, the biggest difference in their playing styles is that "(Kirby is) pass-first and I'm a shoot-first player." On January 3, 2025, the brothers competed against each other for the first time in their respective professional careers in a 4–2 Blackhawks win over the Montreal Canadiens at the United Center.

Dach is also a maternal cousin of Keaton Verhoeff, who was selected ninth overall in the 2026 NHL entry draft.

== Career statistics ==
=== Regular season and playoffs ===
			Regular season					Playoffs
Season	Team	League	GP	G	A	Pts	PIM	GP	G	A	Pts	PIM
2015–16	Fort Saskatchewan Rangers	AMHL	34	14	21	35	12	—	—	—	—	—
2016–17	Fort Saskatchewan Rangers	AMHL	22	6	20	26	6	—	—	—	—	—
2016–17	Saskatoon Blades	WHL	19	6	4	10	4	—	—	—	—	—
2017–18	Saskatoon Blades	WHL	52	7	39	46	12	—	—	—	—	—
2018–19	Saskatoon Blades	WHL	62	25	48	73	40	10	5	3	8	6
2019–20	Rockford IceHogs	AHL	3	0	0	0	0	—	—	—	—	—
2019–20	Chicago Blackhawks	NHL	64	8	15	23	24	9	1	5	6	4
2020–21	Chicago Blackhawks	NHL	18	2	8	10	4	—	—	—	—	—
2021–22	Chicago Blackhawks	NHL	70	9	17	26	43	—	—	—	—	—
2022–23	Montreal Canadiens	NHL	58	14	24	38	43	—	—	—	—	—
2023–24	Montreal Canadiens	NHL	2	0	2	2	0	—	—	—	—	—
2024–25	Montreal Canadiens	NHL	57	10	12	22	40	—	—	—	—	—
2025–26	Montreal Canadiens	NHL	37	8	7	15	31	19	4	1	5	20
NHL totals			306	51	85	136	185	28	5	6	11	24

=== International ===
Year	Team	Event	Result	GP	G	A	Pts	PIM
2017	Canada Black	U17	7th	5	1	6	7	2
2018	Canada	HG18	1st place, gold medalist(s)	5	2	5	7	0
2021	Canada	WJC	2nd place, silver medalist(s)	—	—	—	—	—
Junior totals				10	3	11	14	2

== Awards and honours ==
Award	Year	Ref
CHL
CHL Canada/Russia Series	2018, 2019	
CHL/NHL Top Prospects Game	2019	

Awards and achievements
Preceded by Nicolas Beaudin	Chicago Blackhawks first-round draft pick 2019	Succeeded by Lukas Reichel
