= DAX (application) =

- Developer: DAX Cloud
- Website: www.primefocustechnologies.com www.daxcloud.com

DAX is a cloud based Software as a Service production workflow application used by the television and film industries for media production and digital asset management. The name DAX was created by co-founder Maxim Karp and is derived from "Digital Asset Exchange," and was first registered as a trademark by Sample Digital Holdings, LLC., the name by which the company that developed and provided the technology was known until 2012. Acquired in April, 2014 by Prime Focus Technologies, the company's North American operation is headquartered in Culver City, California. Prime Focus Technologies (PFT), the technology subsidiary of Prime Focus (BSE code: 532748), is a provider of cloud-based production workflow and media asset management applications to the entertainment industry.

The DAX software is used to collaborate on content created throughout the course of motion picture and television production, as well as for marketing and distribution of the final product. DAX is used for storage, review and distribution of digitized production elements, including video, audio, photography and documents such as screenplays, legal contracts, budgets, schedules and basic text documents, among other uses, according to the company's website.

The mobile application also adapts the technology to the industry's increasing global production methods.

The company owns several patents on the technology, including US Patent No: 7,660,416 and 8,218,764 for "System and Method for Media Content Collaboration Throughout a Media Production Process," and trademarks in addition to DAX, including Digital Dailies and iDailies, an application that allows video to be viewed on mobile devices such as the iPad and iPhone.

DAX 4.0, released in April 2013 at the National Association of Broadcasters Show in Las Vegas earned the Studios Daily Prime Award for Ease of Use.

== History ==
DAX Co-founder and current President Patrick Macdonald-King headed the company at its beginnings (Co-founded with Maxim Karp, who designed and built DAX v1 through v3 and led the first implementation at Lions Gate Films) as a merger of three businesses: DAX Solutions (digital asset management software), Digital Dailies (the creator of online dailies), and Sample Media Services (a digital media encoding facility). Sample Digital/Digital Dailies was co-founded by Josh C. Kline and Mike McCoy in 2000. In April 2007, Sample Digital secured funding from Hyperion Media Group and merged the three businesses under the Sample Digital brand, with a focus on building an end-to-end media production workflow platform for content producers and distributors. Sample Digital presented its new platform DAX D3 in April, 2009. In 2011, Sample Digital introduced DAX MOBILE with iDailies exclusively for iPad, allowing the DAX platform to be accessed via iPad.

In 2012, the company's product, DAX, became the company's name and brand. DAX was a sponsor of the Cloud Computing Conference, organized by the Distributed Computing Industry Association as part of the 2013 NAB Show program, where Macdonald-King delivered the keynote address on Cloud Solutions for Content Creation In October 2013, Kline was awarded a Primetime Engineering Emmy Award for his efforts in inventing and launching Digital Dailies, a service that Prime Focus Technologies continues to offer. In March 2014, Macdonald-King sold DAX to Prime Focus Technologies and was appointed president, PFT North America.

DAX opened its first international office in Toronto, Ontario, Canada in 2013.
