= Dirk Müller (stock trader) =

German stock trader

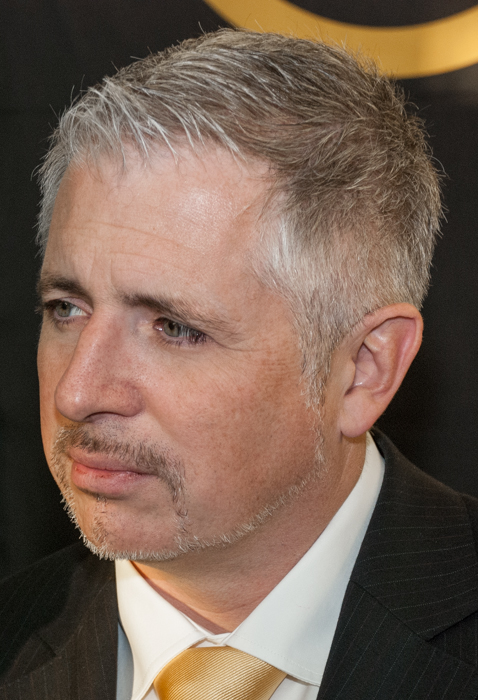
- Müller in 2012
- Born: 25 October 1968; Frankfurt
- Other names: Mr. DAX
- Occupations: Economist; Stock trader; Non-fiction author
- Organizations: Frankfurt Stock Exchange

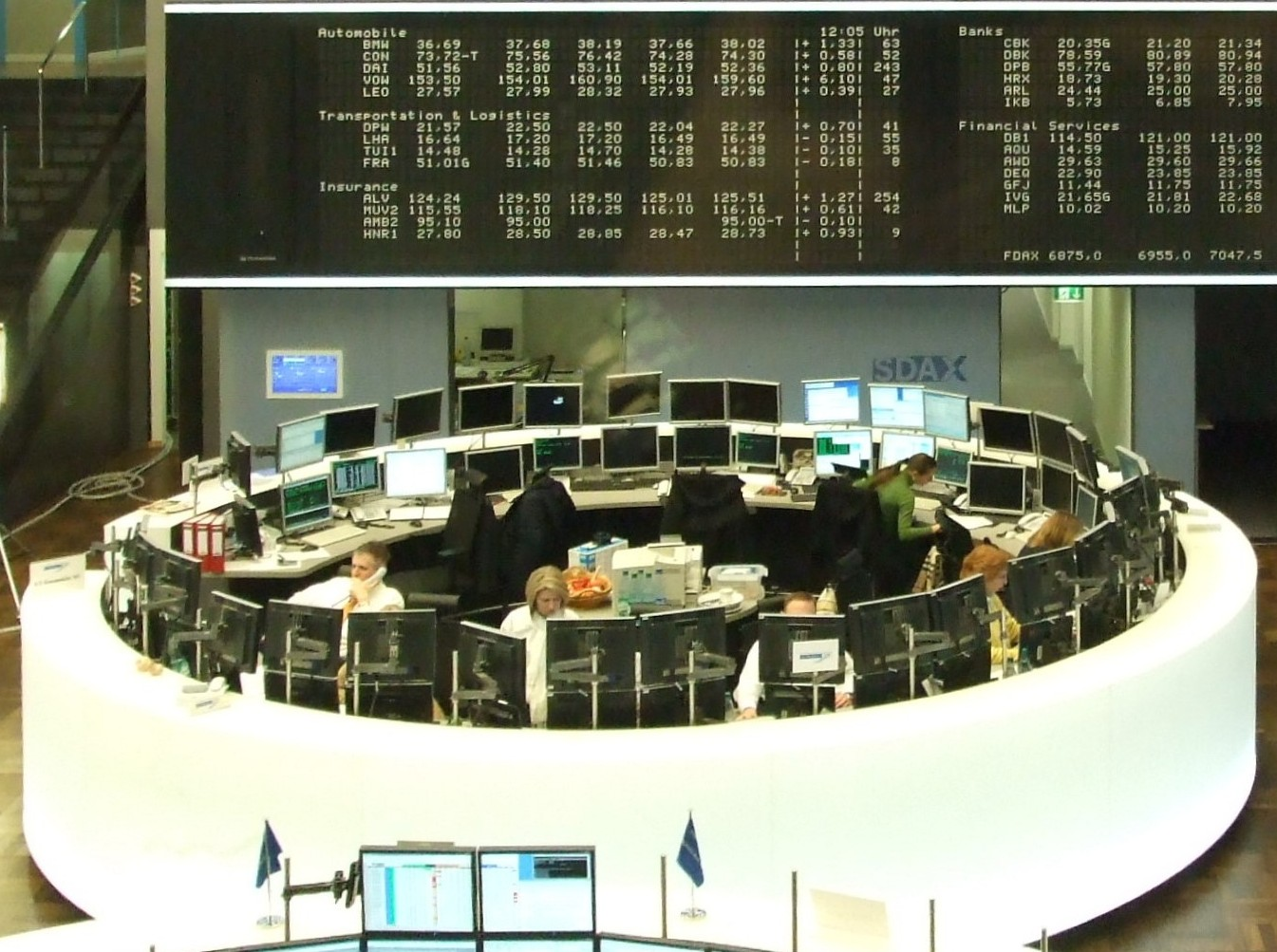
In 2008 (left) at the Frankfurt Stock Exchange

Dirk Müller (born 25 October 1968) is a German stock trader, fund manager and author. He is internationally known as Mr. DAX and Dirk of the DAX, because his workplace was located right under the display of the DAX at the Frankfurt Stock Exchange. Journalists have used his facial expressions to depict the state of the market. In 2015, he founded a stock fund, Dirk Müller Premium Aktien.

== Life ==
Born in Frankfurt, Müller grew up in Reilingen, Rhein-Neckar-Kreis, where he still lives. He passed the Abitur at the Carl-Friedrich-Gauß-Gymnasium in Hockenheim, and then began training as a bank teller and financial assistant at Deutsche Bank in Mannheim.

In 1993, Müller passed the Börsenhändlerprüfung exam. He then worked until 1997 as a broker for Finacor-Rabe & Partner, then for a year for Cantor Fitzgerald International, and from 1998 to 2008 as official stock trader at the Frankfurt Stock Exchange for ICF AG.

In 2008, Müller moved to the company Wertpapierhandelsbank mwb fairtrade AG, where he worked until 2010. Since 2009, he has been the owner and managing director of Finanzethos GmbH, a company running the cashkurs.com website.

Müller published his first book, Crashkurs, in 2009, written in response to the 2008 financial crisis. The successful publication made him well-known. His second book, Cashkurs, was published in 2011 and soon became a bestseller, number 1 on the list of Der Spiegel.

Müller was one of eight experts in a committee meeting of the German parliament Deutscher Bundestag on 27 June 2011, aiming at preventing speculation with agricultural raw materials ("Spekulation mit agrarischen Rohstoffen verhindern").

On 17 April 2015, Müller began his own stock fund, Dirk Müller Premium Aktien. While the fund lost 7% over the first year, it fared better than the DAX during the same time, which lost 16%. However, as of end of May 2021, the fund has lost 8.8% since inception, while the DAX index has gained 28.9%, resulting in an underperformance of 37.7% in seven years.

Müller is married, and the couple has a son.

== Publications ==
=== Print media ===
- Crashkurs. Weltwirtschaftskrise oder Jahrhundertchance? Wie Sie das Beste aus Ihrem Geld machen. (in German), Munich: Droemer, 2009, ISBN 978-3-426-27506-1
- Cashkurs. So machen Sie das Beste aus Ihrem Geld: Aktien, Versicherungen, Immobilien. (in German), Munich: Droemer, 2011, ISBN 978-3-426-27534-4
- Showdown: Der Kampf um Europa und unser Geld (in German), Munich: Droemer, 2013, ISBN 978-3-426-27605-1
- Machtbeben: Die Welt vor der größten Wirtschaftskrise aller Zeiten (in German), München: Random House, 2018, ISBN 978-3-453-20489-8

=== Audio media ===
- Crashkurs. Der Audio Verlag, Berlin, 2009, ISBN 978-3-89813-855-0. (3 CDs, 229 min.)
- Crashkurs. Weltwirtschaftskrise oder Jahrhundertchance? Wie Sie das Beste aus Ihrem Geld machen (aktualisierte Ausgabe) (in German), München: Droemer, 2010, ISBN 978-3-426-41108-7
- Cashkurs: So machen Sie das Beste aus Ihrem Geld (in German) (2nd ed.), München: audio media, 2012, ISBN 978-3-86804-182-8
