= 2017 World U-17 Hockey Challenge =

Tournament details
- Host country: Canada
- Dates: November 5 – November 11
- Teams: 8

The 2017 World Under-17 Hockey Challenge was an ice hockey tournament held in Dawson Creek and Fort St. John, British Columbia, Canada between November 5 and 11. The World Under-17 Hockey Challenge is held by Hockey Canada annually to showcase young hockey talent from across Canada and other strong hockey countries.

== Challenge results ==
=== Preliminary round ===
==== Group A ====
Team	Pld	W	OTW	OTL	L	GF	GA	GD	Pts
United States	3	2	1	0	0	14	9	+5	8
Canada Black	3	2	0	0	1	10	5	+5	6
Canada White	3	1	0	1	1	10	7	+3	4
Czech Republic	3	0	0	0	3	4	17	−13	0

===== Results =====
November 5, 2017	Canada Black	1 – 0	Canada White	Encana Events Centre, Dawson Creek

November 5, 2017	United States	5 – 2	Czech Republic	Encana Events Centre, Dawson Creek

November 6, 2017	Canada White	3 – 4 OT	United States	Encana Events Centre, Dawson Creek

November 6, 2017	Czech Republic	0 – 5	Canada Black	Encana Events Centre, Dawson Creek

November 7, 2017	Czech Republic	2 – 7	Canada White	Encana Events Centre, Dawson Creek

November 7, 2017	United States	5 – 4	Canada Black	Encana Events Centre, Dawson Creek

==== Group B ====
Team	Pld	W	OTW	OTL	L	GF	GA	GD	Pts
Russia	3	3	0	0	0	15	8	+7	9
Finland	3	2	0	0	1	14	9	+5	6
Canada Red	3	1	0	0	2	12	11	+1	3
Sweden	3	0	0	0	3	4	17	−13	0

November 5, 2017	Canada Red	2 – 4	Finland	North Peace Arena, Fort St. John

November 5, 2017	Russia	4 – 1	Sweden	North Peace Arena, Fort St. John

November 6, 2017	Finland	4 – 6	Russia	North Peace Arena, Fort St. John

November 6, 2017	Sweden	2 – 7	Canada Red	North Peace Arena, Fort St. John

November 7, 2017	Sweden	1 – 6	Finland	North Peace Arena, Fort St. John

November 7, 2017	Russia	5 – 3	Canada Red	North Peace Arena, Fort St. John

=== Play Offs ===
Quarterfinals
9 November
Russia	3
Czech Republic	4
9 November
Canada Black	3
Canada Red	4
9 November
United States	5
Sweden	1
9 November
Finland	1
Canada White	5

Semifinals
10 November
Czech Republic	2
Canada Red	3
10 November
United States	9
Canada White	1

Final
11 November
Canada Red	4
United States	6
Third place
11 November
Czech Republic	2
Canada White	1

== Final standings ==
	Team
1st place, gold medalist(s)	United States
2nd place, silver medalist(s)	Canada Red
3rd place, bronze medalist(s)	Czech Republic
4	Canada White
5	Russia
6	Finland
7	Canada Black
8	Sweden
