= 2019 IIHF World U18 Championships =

2019 IIHF U18 World Championship

Tournament details
- Host country: Sweden
- Venues: 2 (in 2 host cities)
- Dates: 18–28 April
- Teams: 10

Final positions
- Champions: Sweden (1st title)
- Runners-up: Russia
- Third place: United States
- Fourth place: Canada

Tournament statistics
- Games played: 31
- Goals scored: 233 (7.52 per game)
- Attendance: 36,485 (1,177 per game)
- Scoring leader: (United States) Jack Hughes (20 points)

Awards
- MVP: (United States) Cole Caufield

Official website
- IIHF.com

The 2019 IIHF U18 World Championship was the 21st such event hosted by the International Ice Hockey Federation. Teams participated at several levels of competition. The competition also served as qualifications for the 2020 competition. One national team, Luxembourg, returned to play in the World Championships for the first time since playing in the 2000 European qualification tiers.

Sweden won the title on home ice. It was the nation's first U18 World Championship. Defending champion Finland finished in seventh place and without a medal for the first time since 2014.

== Top Division ==
The Top Division tournament was played in Örnsköldsvik and Umeå, Sweden, from 18 to 28 April 2019.

=== Match officials ===
12 referees and 10 linesmen were selected for the tournament.

Referees

- (Finland) Aaro Brännare
- (Canada) Michael Campbell
- (Czech Republic) Oldřich Hejduk
- (Finland) Joonas Kova
- (Canada) Guillaume Labonté
- (Sweden) Marcus Linde
- (United States) Sean MacFarlane
- (Russia) Sergey Morozov
- (Germany) Andre Schrader
- (Belarus) Andrei Shrubok
- (Slovakia) Miroslav Štefík
- (Switzerland) Michael Tscherrig

Linesmen

- (Belarus) Pavel Badyl
- (United States) Riley Bowles
- (Denmark) Henrik Haurum
- (Norway) Jon Kilian
- (Sweden) Ludvig Lundgren
- (Switzerland) David Obwegeser
- (Finland) Jani Pesonen
- (Russia) Nikita Shalagin
- (Czech Republic) Josef Špůr
- (Canada) Tarrington Wyonzek

=== Preliminary round ===
All times are local (UTC+2).

==== Group A ====
Pos	Team	Pld	W	OTW	OTL	L	GF	GA	GD	Pts	Qualification
1	Canada	4	4	0	0	0	29	10	+19	12	Quarterfinals
2	Belarus	4	2	0	1	1	13	22	−9	7	Quarterfinals
3	Czech Republic	4	2	0	0	2	17	14	+3	6	Quarterfinals
4	Finland	4	1	0	0	3	20	13	+7	3	Quarterfinals
5	Switzerland	4	0	1	0	3	11	31	−20	2	Relegation round

Source: IIHF
Rules for classification: 1) points; 2) head-to-head points; 3) head-to-head goal difference; 4) head-to-head number of goals scored; 5) result against closest best-ranked team outside tied teams; 6) result against second-best ranked team outside tied teams; 7) seeding before tournament.

18 April 2019; 15:30	Czech Republic	3–4 (0–2, 2–2, 1–0)	Belarus	A3 Arena, Umeå; Attendance: 190

Game reference

Jan Bednář
Goalies
Alexei Kolosov
Referees:
(Sweden) Marcus Linde
(Germany) Andre Schrader
Linesmen:
(Sweden) Ludvig Lundgren
(Finland) Jani Pesonen

	0–1	00:12 – Oxentyuk (Usov)
	0–2	17:52 – Kolyachonok (PP)
Haš (Teplý) – 23:21	1–2
Mlčák (Přikryl) – 26:30	2–2
	2–3	29:43 – Buyalski (Oxentyuk, Usov)
	2–4	37:19 – Belov (Kuznetsov, Pinchuk) (PP)
Volráb (Koffer) – 52:40	3–4

14 min
Penalties
14 min
50
Shots
34

18 April 2019; 19:30	Canada	5–3 (0–2, 2–1, 3–0)	Finland	A3 Arena, Umeå; Attendance: 2,328

Game reference

Taylor Gauthier
Goalies
Roope Taponen
Referees:
(Czech Republic) Oldřich Hejduk
(Russia) Sergey Morozov
Linesmen:
(Denmark) Henrik Haurum
(Norway) Jon Kilian

	0–1	07:27 – Räty
	0–2	11:59 – Saarela (Simontaival) (PP2)
	0–3	21:03 – Lundell (Tieksola, Tuomisto)
Rees (SH) – 24:55	1–3
Newhook (Korczak) – 29:42	2–3
Tracey (Krebs) (PP) – 43:57	3–3
Tracey (Zary) – 54:31	4–3
Krebs (Holloway) (PP, EN) – 59:29	5–3

12 min
Penalties
12 min
40
Shots
42

19 April 2019; 15:30	Canada	7–4 (3–0, 1–3, 3–1)	Switzerland	A3 Arena, Umeå; Attendance: 458

Game reference

Taylor Gauthier
Goalies
Andri Henauer
Referees:
(Sweden) Marcus Linde
(Slovakia) Miroslav Štefík
Linesmen:
(Belarus) Pavel Badyl
(Czech Republic) Josef Špůr

Zary (Tracey, Rees) – 03:40	1–0
Tracey (Zary, Rees) – 07:04	2–0
Harley (Tomasino) – 10:19	3–0
	3–1	22:57 – Schläpfer
	3–2	29:42 – Schläpfer (Zürcher, Delémont) (PP)
	3–3	36:02 – Rubanik (Schläpfer)
Krebs (Drysdale) – 38:23	4–3
Tracey (Newhook, Harley) (PP) – 45:38	5–3
	5–4	48:21 – Salzgeber (Canova, Stoffel)
Cozens (Pelletier, Newhook) – 49:58	6–4
Holloway (Krebs) – 53:30	7–4

6 min
Penalties
8 min
60
Shots
28

19 April 2019; 19:30	Belarus	4–3 (1–0, 2–0, 1–3)	Finland	A3 Arena, Umeå; Attendance: 362

Game reference

Rostislav Zinovenko
Goalies
Roope Taponen
Referees:
(Canada) Guillaume Labonté
(Russia) Sergey Morozov
Linesmen:
(Switzerland) David Obwegeser
(Russia) Nikita Shalagin

Kozorez (Buyalski, Oxentyuk) (PP) – 17:45	1–0
Palchik (Martynov) (SH) – 26:56	2–0
Oxentyuk (Buyalski, Kolyachonok) – 33:17	3–0
Buyalski (Oxentyuk, Usov) – 43:48	4–0
	4–1	48:10 – Tieksola (Aaltonen, Pärssinen)
	4–2	50:02 – Puistola (Saarela, Heinola)
	4–3	55:40 – Niemelä (Aaltonen)

14 min
Penalties
12 min
19
Shots
61

20 April 2019; 15:30	Switzerland	2–8 (0–2, 1–3, 1–3)	Czech Republic	A3 Arena, Umeå; Attendance: 582

Game reference

Andri Henauer
Noah Patenaude
Goalies
Lukáš Pařík
Referees:
(Finland) Joonas Kova
(Russia) Sergey Morozov
Linesmen:
(Belarus) Pavel Badyl
(United States) Riley Bowles

	0–1	02:01 – Koffer (Myšák, Barinka) (PP)
	0–2	12:21 – Raška (Barinka)
	0–3	21:18 – Lang (Haš) (PP)
	0–4	22:40 – Rutar (Pšenička) (PP)
Rubanik (Chanton, Knak) (PP2) – 24:44	1–4
	1–5	38:34 – Rychlovský (Koffer)
	1–6	40:32 – Lang (Přikryl)
Dähler – 50:52	2–6
	2–7	51:50 – Najman (Kubíček)
	2–8	56:22 – Koffer (Najman, Rychlovský)

14 min
Penalties
8 min
43
Shots
59

21 April 2019; 15:30	Finland	2–4 (0–1, 1–1, 1–2)	Czech Republic	A3 Arena, Umeå; Attendance: 416

Game reference

Kari Piiroinen
Goalies
Lukáš Pařík
Referees:
(Sweden) Marcus Linde
(Switzerland) Michael Tscherrig
Linesmen:
(Norway) Jon Kilian
(Russia) Nikita Shalagin

	0–1	00:37 – Lang (Přikryl, Mužík)
Puistola (Räty, Heinola) (PP) – 28:39	1–1
	1–2	33:49 – Koffer (Barinka, Myšák) (PP)
	1–3	49:53 – Toman (Peterek, Teplý)
	1–4	58:36 – Koffer (Raška) (PP)
Räty – 59:09	2–4

26 min
Penalties
10 min
49
Shots
31

21 April 2019; 19:30	Belarus	1–11 (0–3, 1–5, 0–3)	Canada	A3 Arena, Umeå; Attendance: 293

Game reference

Rostislav Zinovenko
Alexei Kolosov
Goalies
Nolan Maier
Referees:
(Czech Republic) Oldřich Hejduk
(Slovakia) Miroslav Štefík
Linesmen:
(United States) Riley Bowles
(Sweden) Ludvig Lundgren

	0–1	04:24 – Zary (Tomasino) (PP)
	0–2	13:36 – Spence (Rees)
	0–3	19:57 – Newhook (Cozens)
	0–4	20:34 – Schneider (Rees, Vukojevic (SH)
	0–5	29:02 – Newhook (Tracey, Cozens)
	0–6	29:42 – Légaré (Vukojevic)
	0–7	37:28 – Cozens (Krebs)
	0–8	37:41 – Krebs (Cozens)
Pinchuk (Kuznetsov, Kolyachonok) (PP) – 38:49	1–8
	1–9	41:22 – Cozens (Newhook, Harley) (PP)
	1–10	57:54 – Légaré (Washkurak) (PP)
	1–11	58:09 – Poulin (Drysdale, Hunt) (PP)

12 min
Penalties
18 min
42
Shots
60

22 April 2019; 15:30	Switzerland	5–4 OT (3–0, 0–2, 1–2); OT: (1–0)	Belarus	A3 Arena, Umeå; Attendance: 404

Game reference

Florian Vuichard
Goalies
Alexei Kolosov
Rostislav Zinovenko
Referees:
(United States) Sean McFarlane
(Germany) Andre Schrader
Linesmen:
(Finland) Jani Pesonen
(Canada) Tarrington Wyonzek

Rubanik (Fuss, Zürcher) – 13:18	1–0
Marchand (Knak) – 14:07	2–0
Salzgeber (Stoffel, Jobin) – 14:50	3–0
	3–1	21:42 – Pinchuk (Kolyachonok, Demchenko)
	3–2	39:54 – Oxentyuk (Kozorez)
	3–3	50:22 – Kuznetsov (Demchenko, Denisov)
	3–4	50:40 – Palchik (Kolyachonok, Kozorez)
Fuss (Zürcher, Schläpfer) – 52:06	4–4
Canova (Knak, Baragano) – 64:42	5–4

16 min
Penalties
14 min
42
Shots
58

23 April 2019; 15:30	Finland	12–0 (4–0, 4–0, 4–0)	Switzerland	A3 Arena, Umeå; Attendance: 468

Game reference

Roope Taponen
Goalies
Andri Henauer
Florian Vuichard
Referees:
(Canada) Guillaume Labonté
(United States) Sean MacFarlane
Linesmen:
(United States) Riley Bowles
(Czech Republic) Josef Špůr

Intonen (Simontaival, Miettinen) – 02:26	1–0
Simontaival (Miettinen, Kokkonen) – 07:28	2–0
Lundell (Aaltonen) (SH) – 09:44	3–0
Petman (Simontaival, Räsänen) (EA) – 19:11	4–0
Aaltonen (Tuomisto, Tieksola) (PP) – 21:43	5–0
Puistola (SH) – 27:04	6–0
Puistola (Heinola, Lundell) (PP2) – 35:53	7–0
Miettinen (Lundell, Aaltonen) (PP) – 36:55	8–0
Heinola – 40:36	9–0
Loponen (Intonen, Miettinen) – 49:55	10–0
Puistola (Saarela, Loponen) – 53:42	11–0
Pärssinen (Tieksola) – 58:59	12–0

33 min
Penalties
10 min
63
Shots
21

23 April 2019; 19:30	Czech Republic	2–6 (2–1, 0–2, 0–3)	Canada	A3 Arena, Umeå; Attendance: 407

Game reference

Lukáš Pařík
Goalies
Nolan Maier
Referees:
(Finland) Aaro Brännare
(Russia) Sergey Morozov
Linesmen:
(Norway) Jon Kilian
(Sweden) Ludvig Lundgren

Volráb (Rutar, Peterek) (PP) – 04:25	1–0
Barinka (Myšák) – 05:57	2–0
	2–1	11:42 – Newhook (Rees)
	2–2	21:48 – Holloway (Tomasino)
	2–3	35:12 – Tomasino (Holloway, Pelletier)
	2–4	51:51 – Légaré (Spence) (PP2)
	2–5	53:37 – Rees (Spence)
	2–6	54:57 – Krebs (Cozens, Newhook)

36 min
Penalties
18 min
25
Shots
58

==== Group B ====
Pos	Team	Pld	W	OTW	OTL	L	GF	GA	GD	Pts	Qualification
1	United States	4	4	0	0	0	31	10	+21	12	Quarterfinals
2	Sweden (H)	4	3	0	0	1	14	9	+5	9	Quarterfinals
3	Russia	4	2	0	0	2	14	13	+1	6	Quarterfinals
4	Latvia	4	1	0	0	3	6	17	−11	3	Quarterfinals
5	Slovakia	4	0	0	0	4	9	25	−16	0	Relegation round

Source: IIHF
Rules for classification: 1) points; 2) head-to-head points; 3) head-to-head goal difference; 4) head-to-head number of goals scored; 5) result against closest best-ranked team outside tied teams; 6) result against second-best ranked team outside tied teams; 7) seeding before tournament.
(H) Host

18 April 2019; 15:30	Russia	6–3 (3–1, 1–1, 2–1)	Slovakia	Fjällräven Center, Örnsköldsvik; Attendance: 423

Game reference

Vsevolod Skotnikov
Goalies
Samuel Hlavaj
Referees:
(Finland) Aaro Brännare
(Canada) Michael Campbell
Linesmen:
(United States) Riley Bowles
(Canada) Tarrington Wyonzek

Nikolayev – 04:14	1–0
	1–1	08:40 – Čajkovič (Turanský, Sojka) (PP)
Amirov (PS) – 07:24	2–1
Gritsyuk (Spiridonov) (PP) – 16:52	3–1
Groshev – 23:55	4–1
	4–2	31:49 – Chromiak (Lašák, Mudrák) (PP)
Gritsyuk (Spiridonov, Chinakhov) – 40:15	5–2
	5–3	53:22 – Čajkovič (Turanský, Lavička) (PP)
Khusnutdinov (EN) – 59:20	6–3

26 min
Penalties
8 min
45
Shots
31

18 April 2019; 19:30	Sweden	1–6 (1–0, 0–2, 0–4)	United States	Fjällräven Center, Örnsköldsvik; Attendance: 4,228

Game reference

Hugo Alnefelt
Goalies
Spencer Knight
Referees:
(Finland) Joonas Kova
(Canada) Guillaume Labonté
Linesmen:
(Russia) Nikita Shalagin
(Czech Republic) Josef Špůr

Holmström (Nybeck, Costmar) – 14:16	1–0
	1–1	24:47 – Caufield (Boldy, Warren)
	1–2	25:26 – Beecher (Thrun)
	1–3	40:21 – McCarthy (York, Beecher)
	1–4	43:02 – Caufield (Boldy)
	1–5	45:15 – Caufield (York, Turcotte) (PP)
	1–6	56:59 – Turcotte (Hughes, Boldy) (PP)

12 min
Penalties
8 min
30
Shots
42

19 April 2019; 15:30	Slovakia	5–12 (1–3, 1–2, 3–7)	United States	Fjällräven Center, Örnsköldsvik; Attendance: 620

Game reference

Patrik Kozel
Goalies
Cam Rowe
Referees:
(Belarus) Andrei Shrubok
(Switzerland) Michael Tscherrig
Linesmen:
(Norway) Jon Kilian
(Finland) Jani Pesonen

	0–1	07:42 – Caufield (Hughes, McCarthy)
	0–2	17:27 – Turcotte (Moynihan, Boldy)
Krajč (Golian, Turan) (PP) – 19:31	1–2
	1–3	19:41 – Boldy (Helleson, Moynihan)
	1–4	20:59 – Hughes (Caufield)
Sojka (Čajkovič, Turanský) (PP) – 25:42	2–4
	2–5	39:47 – Caufield (Turcotte) (PP)
	2–6	41:55 – Hughes (Gildon, Caufield)
	2–7	43:15 – Lindmark (Turcotte, Warren)
Valigura (SH) – 45:09	3–7
Chromiak (SH) – 46:21	4–7
	4–8	50:34 – Caufield (Hughes)
	4–9	52:13 – Hughes (Turcotte, Boldy) (PP)
Eliáš (Gajdoš) – 54:12	5–9
	5–10	55:00 – Hughes
	5–11	55:32 – York (Helleson, Farrell)
	5–12	57:17 – Caufield (Hughes, Boldy) (PP)

10 min
Penalties
12 min
35
Shots
47

19 April 2019; 19:30	Sweden	5–2 (2–1, 1–0, 2–1)	Latvia	Fjällräven Center, Örnsköldsvik; Attendance: 1,257

Game reference

Jesper Wallstedt
Goalies
Artūrs Šilovs
Referees:
(Canada) Michael Campbell
(United States) Sean MacFarlane
Linesmen:
(Denmark) Henrik Haurum
(Canada) Tarrington Wyonzek

	0–1	07:17 – Zabusovs
Henriksson (Raymond) (PP) – 11:31	1–1
Bjerselius (Nybeck) – 13:03	2–1
Holtz (Wahlgren, Henriksson) (PP) – 26:15	3–1
	3–2	41:55 – Švanenbergs (Millers)
Henriksson (Holtz, Wahlgren) (PP) – 47:39	4–2
Raymond (Holtz, Henriksson) (PP) – 55:45	5–2

18 min
Penalties
14 min
46
Shots
20

20 April 2019; 15:30	Latvia	1–5 (0–1, 1–2, 0–2)	Russia	Fjällräven Center, Örnsköldsvik; Attendance: 617

Game reference

Artūrs Šilovs
Goalies
Yaroslav Askarov
Referees:
(Czech Republic) Oldřich Hejduk
(Slovakia) Miroslav Štefík
Linesmen:
(Sweden) Ludvig Lundgren
(Switzerland) David Obwegeser

	0–1	13:35 – Groshev (Bryzgalov)
Ansons (Polcs) – 26:21	1–1
	1–2	31:58 – Chistyakov (Nikolayev, Amirov)
	1–3	32:49 – Sheshin (Gushin)
	1–4	59:40 – Amirov (Nikolayev) (EN)
	1–5	59:48 – Mingachyov (Groshev)

8 min
Penalties
8 min
15
Shots
44

21 April 2019; 15:30	United States	6–3 (2–2, 2–0, 2–1)	Russia	Fjällräven Center, Örnsköldsvik; Attendance: 745

Game reference

Spencer Knight
Goalies
Yaroslav Askarov
Vsevolod Skotnikov
Referees:
(Finland) Aaro Brännare
(Germany) Andre Schrader
Linesmen:
(Denmark) Henrik Haurum
(Czech Republic) Josef Špůr

	0–1	05:48 – Chinakhov (Rogov) (PP)
	0–2	07:56 – Amirov (Podkolzin)
Hughes (York, Zegras) (PP) – 09:40	1–2
Turcotte (Boldy, Brink) – 14:51	2–2
Boldy (Brink, Fensore) (PP) – 31:55	3–2
Caufield (Hughes, Turcotte) – 39:32	4–2
	4–3	52:04 – Spiridonov (Burenov)
Caufield (McCarthy, Fensore) – 54:25	5–3
Beniers (York) – 59:57	6–3

6 min
Penalties
10 min
43
Shots
23

21 April 2019; 19:30	Slovakia	1–5 (0–1, 1–2, 0–2)	Sweden	Fjällräven Center, Örnsköldsvik; Attendance: 1,831

Game reference

Samuel Hlavaj
Goalies
Jesper Wallstedt
Referees:
(Canada) Michael Campbell
(Canada) Guillaume Labonté
Linesmen:
(Belarus) Pavel Badyl
(Switzerland) David Obwegeser

	0–1	00:14 – Bjerselius (SH)
Sojka (Čajkovič) – 24:25	1–1
	1–2	27:18 – Henriksson (Broberg, Söderström)
	1–3	31:19 – Nybeck (Broberg, Wallstedt)
	1–4	48:13 – Lawner (Broberg)
	1–5	56:58 – Nybeck (SH)

14 min
Penalties
8 min
27
Shots
54

22 April 2019; 15:30	Latvia	2–0 (0–0, 2–0, 0–0)	Slovakia	Fjällräven Center, Örnsköldsvik; Attendance: 613

Game reference
Artūrs Šilovs	Goalies	Samuel Hlavaj	Referees: (Belarus) Andrei Shrubok (Switzerland) Michael Tscherrig; Linesmen: (Belarus) Pavel Badyl (Switzerland) David Obwegeser
Ošenieks – 25:56 / 1–0; Jevdokimovs (Ansons, Ozols) – 28:36 / 2–0			Referees: (Belarus) Andrei Shrubok (Switzerland) Michael Tscherrig; Linesmen: (Belarus) Pavel Badyl (Switzerland) David Obwegeser
2 min	Penalties	10 min	Referees: (Belarus) Andrei Shrubok (Switzerland) Michael Tscherrig; Linesmen: (Belarus) Pavel Badyl (Switzerland) David Obwegeser
26	Shots	24	Referees: (Belarus) Andrei Shrubok (Switzerland) Michael Tscherrig; Linesmen: (Belarus) Pavel Badyl (Switzerland) David Obwegeser

23 April 2019; 15:30	United States	7–1 (1–0, 4–0, 2–1)	Latvia	Fjällräven Center, Örnsköldsvik; Attendance: 687

Game reference

Spencer Knight
Cam Rowe
Goalies
Artūrs Šilovs
Rūdolfs Lazdiņš
Referees:
(Canada) Michael Campbell
(Belarus) Andrei Shrubok
Linesmen:
(Finland) Jani Pesonen
(Russia) Nikita Shalagin

Beecher (Warren, Farrell) – 02:00	1–0
Caufield (Zegras) – 25:37	2–0
York (Hughes) – 30:48	3–0
Caufield (Zegras, Hughes) (PP) – 34:40	4–0
Beecher (Knight) – 38:20	5–0
	5–1	40:08 – Skrastiņš (Ošenieks, Tumānovs)
Boldy (Brink, Fensore) (PP) – 45:10	6–1
Brink (Boldy) – 55:59	7–1

14 min
Penalties
16 min
46
Shots
14

23 April 2019; 19:30	Russia	0–3 (0–0, 0–2, 0–1)	Sweden	Fjällräven Center, Örnsköldsvik; Attendance: 3,321

Game reference

Yaroslav Askarov
Goalies
Hugo Alnefelt
Referees:
(Finland) Joonas Kova
(Germany) Andre Schrader
Linesmen:
(Denmark) Henrik Haurum
(Canada) Tarrington Wyonzek

0–1	23:56 – Broberg (PP)
0–2	33:06 – Lawner (Raymond, Hedström) (EA)
0–3	53:54 – Holmström

14 min
Penalties
4 min
32
Shots
25

=== Relegation round ===
25 April 2019; 11:30	Switzerland	4–1 (2–1, 1–0, 1–0)	Slovakia	A3 Arena, Umeå; Attendance: 169

Game reference

Andri Henauer
Goalies
Samuel Hlavaj
Patrik Kozel
Referees:
(Canada) Guillaume Labonté
(Belarus) Andrei Shrubok
Linesmen:
(Belarus) Pavel Badyl
(Norway) Jon Kilian

	0–1	02:46 – Sojka (Čajkovič, Turan) (PP)
Schläpfer (Fuss, Zürcher) – 09:27	1–1
Stoffel (Delémont) – 19:02	2–1
Jobin (Rubanik) (PP) – 21:08	3–1
Canova (Pezzullo) (PP) – 58:48	4–1

12 min
Penalties
18 min
42
Shots
46

27 April 2019; 19:30	Slovakia	4–3 (1–1, 2–2, 1–0)	Switzerland	A3 Arena, Umeå; Attendance: 152

Game reference

Patrik Kozel
Goalies
Andri Henauer
Referees:
(Finland) Aaro Brännare
(Czech Republic) Oldřich Hejduk
Linesmen:
(Belarus) Pavel Badyl
(Norway) Jon Kilian

Valigura (Turanský, Mudrák) – 02:17	1–0
	1–1	19:57 – Dähler (Jobin, Canova)
	1–2	25:56 – Salzgeber (Guggenheim)
Krajč (Chromiak) – 28:35	2–2
Škvarek (Lašák, Eliáš) – 29:59	3–2
	3–3	38:45 – Jobin (Dähler)
Čajkovič (PS) – 57:32	4–3

10 min
Penalties
6 min
35
Shots
46

28 April 2019; 15:30	Switzerland	6–3 (2–2, 1–0, 3–1)	Slovakia	A3 Arena, Umeå; Attendance: 76

Game reference

Andri Henauer
Goalies
Patrik Kozel
Referees:
(Finland) Joonas Kova
(Sweden) Marcus Linde
Linesmen:
(Russia) Nikita Shalagin
(Czech Republic) Josef Špůr

Canova (Bardh) – 04:13	1–0
	1–1	13:03 – Haščák (Krajč)
Fuss (Schläpfer) – 13:45	2–1
	2–2	16:40 – Mrazík (Turan, Čajkovič) (PP)
Dähler (Canova) – 37:21	3–2
Salzgeber (Fuss, Zürcher) – 41:56	4–2
Zürcher (PP) – 50:02	5–2
Knak (Delémont) – 50:35	6–2
	6–3	54:54 – Haščák (PP)

10 min
Penalties
37 min
39
Shots
44

=== Playoff round ===
==== Bracket ====
Quarterfinals
25 April
Canada	3
Latvia	1
25 April
Sweden	4
Czech Republic	2
25 April
United States	6
Finland	0
25 April
Belarus	0
Russia	6

Semifinals
27 April
Canada	3
Sweden	4
27 April
United States	2
Russia (GWS)	3

Final
28 April
Sweden (OT)	4
Russia	3
Third place
28 April
United States	5
Canada	2

==== Quarterfinals ====
25 April 2019; 15:30	Belarus	0–6 (0–2, 0–3, 0–1)	Russia	A3 Arena, Umeå; Attendance: 191

Game reference

Rostislav Zinovenko
Alexei Kolosov
Goalies
Yaroslav Askarov
Referees:
(Finland) Joonas Kova
(Slovakia) Miroslav Štefík
Linesmen:
(United States) Riley Bowles
(Czech Republic) Josef Špůr

0–1	16:16 – Nikolayev (Podkolzin, Amirov)
0–2	19:01 – Gritsyuk (Spiridonov) (PP)
0–3	23:08 – Gushin (Likhachyov)
0–4	24:49 – Amirov (Likhachyov) (PP)
0–5	38:59 – Chinakhov (Kirpichnikov) (PP)
0–6	56:04 – Spiridonov (Gritsyuk)

18 min
Penalties
4 min
19
Shots
65

25 April 2019; 15:30	United States	6–0 (2–0, 2–0, 2–0)	Finland	Fjällräven Center, Örnsköldsvik; Attendance: 922

Game reference

Spencer Knight
Goalies
Roope Taponen
Referees:
(Canada) Michael Campbell
(Germany) Andre Schrader
Linesmen:
(Sweden) Ludvig Lundgren
(Canada) Tarrington Wyonzek

Beniers (Vlasic, Helleson) – 06:25	1–0
Hughes (Zegras) – 11:06	2–0
Hughes – 24:56	3–0
Hughes (Zegras, Caufield) – 39:10	4–0
Caufield (Hughes, Zegras) – 52:06	5–0
Brink (Zegras, York) – 52:53	6–0

10 min
Penalties
10 min
35
Shots
21

25 April 2019; 19:30	Canada	3–1 (1–0, 1–0, 1–1)	Latvia	A3 Arena, Umeå; Attendance: 242

Game reference

Taylor Gauthier
Goalies
Artūrs Šilovs
Referees:
(Finland) Aaro Brännare
(Russia) Sergey Morozov
Linesmen:
(Denmark) Henrik Haurum
(Switzerland) David Obwegeser

Schneider (Tracey) – 13:48	1–0
Krebs – 27:34	2–0
	2–1	50:01 – Brants (Vītoliņš, Polcs) (PP)
Krebs (Zary, Schneider) (EN) – 59:40	3–1

12 min
Penalties
18 min
43
Shots
39

25 April 2019; 19:30	Sweden	4–2 (2–0, 1–1, 1–1)	Czech Republic	Fjällräven Center, Örnsköldsvik; Attendance: 2,248

Game reference

Hugo Alnefelt
Goalies
Lukáš Pařík
Jan Bednář
Referees:
(United States) Sean MacFarlane
(Switzerland) Michael Tscherrig
Linesmen:
(Finland) Jani Pesonen
(Russia) Nikita Shalagin

Holtz (Raymonds) (PP) – 09:55	1–0
Söderblom (Nybeck, Andersson) – 10:19	2–0
Grewe (Bjerselius, Holmström) (PP) – 21:27	3–0
	3–1	33:33 – Barinka (Kučeřík, Teplý)
	3–2	43:46 – Mužík (Lang)
Bjerselius (Andersson) (EN) – 59:10	4–2

10 min
Penalties
24 min
28
Shots
34

==== Semifinals ====
27 April 2019; 15:30	United States	2–3 GWS (0–0, 0–1, 2–1); OT: (0–0); SO: (0–1)	Russia	Fjällräven Center, Örnsköldsvik; Attendance: 1,547

Game reference

Spencer Knight
Goalies
Yaroslav Askarov
Referees:
(Canada) Guillaume Labonté
(Sweden) Marcus Linde
Linesmen:
(Switzerland) David Obwegeser
(Czech Republic) Josef Špůr

	0–1	38:24 – Amirov (Sheshin) (SH)
Caufield (Hughes, York) (PP) – 40:12	1–1
Caufield (McCarthy, Zegras) – 43:16	2–1
	2–2	47:27 – Chistyakov (Gritsyuk, Spiridonov)

Turcotte (miss)
Caufield (miss)
Hughes (miss)
Zegras (miss)
Boldy (miss)
Shootout
(miss) Chinakhov
(miss) Podkolzin
Amirov
(miss) Gritsyuk
8 min
Penalties
16 min
42
Shots
34

27 April 2019; 19:30	Canada	3–4 (1–1, 1–1, 1–2)	Sweden	Fjällräven Center, Örnsköldsvik; Attendance: 3,519

Game reference

Taylor Gauthier
Goalies
Hugo Alnefelt
Referees:
(Finland) Joonas Kova
(Switzerland) Michael Tscherrig
Linesmen:
(Finland) Jani Pesonen
(Russia) Nikita Shalagin

	0–1	11:47 – Broberg (Henriksson, Holmström)
Zary (Tomasino, Harley) (PP) – 16:14	1–1
Newhook (Cozens, Krebs) – 21:27	2–1
	2–2	33:55 – Holtz (Raymond, Henriksson)
	2–3	49:23 – Holtz (Björnfot, Henriksson) (PP)
Zary (Suzuki, Rees) – 52:49	3–3
	3–4	57:29 – Grewe (Bjerselius, Holmström)

14 min
Penalties
4 min
34
Shots
30

==== Bronze medal game ====
28 April 2019; 15:30	United States	5–2 (1–1, 3–0, 1–1)	Canada	Fjällräven Center, Örnsköldsvik; Attendance: 1,567

Game reference

Spencer Knight
Goalies
Nolan Maier
Referees:
(Russia) Sergey Morozov
(Germany) Andre Schrader
Linesmen:
(Denmark) Henrik Haurum
(Sweden) Ludvig Lundgren

Turcotte (Hughes) (PP) – 08:03	1–0
	1–1	19:06 – Cozens (Newhook) (PP)
Hughes (York) – 26:54	2–1
Brink (Boldy, Fensore) (PP) – 32:59	3–1
York (Hughes, Caufield) (PP) – 35:18	4–1
York (Zegras) (PP) – 54:26	5–1
	5–2	59:54 – Légaré (Poulin)

6 min
Penalties
14 min
41
Shots
23

==== Final ====
28 April 2019; 19:30	Sweden	4–3 OT (1–0, 1–1, 1–2); OT: (1–0)	Russia	Fjällräven Center, Örnsköldsvik; Attendance: 5,602

Game reference

Hugo Alnefelt
Goalies
Yaroslav Askarov
Referees:
(Canada) Michael Campbell
(United States) Sean MacFarlance
Linesmen:
(United States) Riley Bowles
(Canada) Tarrington Wyonzek

Raymond (Holtz, Henriksson) – 09:32	1–0
Holmström – 25:53	2–0
	2–1	31:48 – Podkolzin (Amirov, Khusnutdinov)
	2–2	40:20 – Amirov (Podkolzin, Khusnutdinov)
	2–3	50:22 – Groshev (Vashenko)
Raymond (Holtz, Broberg) – 50:47	3–3
Raymond (Brännstam, Johansson) – 65:44	4–3

10 min
Penalties
6 min
30
Shots
38

=== Final standings ===
Pos	Grp	Team	Pld	W	OTW	OTL	L	GF	GA	GD	Pts	Final result
1	B	Sweden (H)	7	5	1	0	1	26	17	+9	17	Champions
2	B	Russia	7	3	1	1	2	26	19	+7	12	Runners-up
3	B	United States	7	6	0	1	0	44	15	+29	19	Third place
4	A	Canada	7	5	0	0	2	37	20	+17	15	Fourth place
5	A	Belarus	5	2	0	1	2	13	28	−15	7	Eliminated in Quarterfinals
6	A	Czech Republic	5	2	0	0	3	19	18	+1	6	Eliminated in Quarterfinals
7	A	Finland	5	1	0	0	4	20	19	+1	3	Eliminated in Quarterfinals
8	B	Latvia	5	1	0	0	4	7	20	−13	3	Eliminated in Quarterfinals
9	A	Switzerland	7	2	1	0	4	24	39	−15	8	
10	B	Slovakia	7	1	0	0	6	17	38	−21	3	Relegated to 2020 Division I A

Source: IIHF
(H) Host

=== Statistics ===
==== Scoring leaders ====
List shows the top ten skaters sorted by points, then goals.

Player	GP	G	A	Pts	+/−	PIM
(United States) Jack Hughes	7	9	11	20	+10	8
(United States) Cole Caufield	7	14	4	18	+12	4
(United States) Matthew Boldy	7	3	9	12	+6	0
(United States) Cameron York	7	4	7	11	+13	0
(Canada) Peyton Krebs	7	6	4	10	+9	4
(Canada) Alex Newhook	7	5	5	10	+6	0
(Russia) Rodion Amirov	7	6	3	9	+4	2
(Canada) Dylan Cozens	7	4	5	9	+8	4
(United States) Alex Turcotte	7	4	5	9	+4	4
(Sweden) Karl Henriksson	7	3	6	9	+1	2

GP = Games played; G = Goals; A = Assists; Pts = Points; +/− = Plus–minus; PIM = Penalties In Minutes
Source: IIHF.com

==== Leading goaltenders ====
Only the top five goaltenders, based on save percentage, who have played 40% of their team's minutes are included in this list.

Player	TOI	SA	GA	GAA	Sv%	SO
(United States) Spencer Knight	357:33	141	9	1.51	93.62	1
(Canada) Nolan Maier	180:00	108	8	2.67	92.59	0
(Czech Republic) Lukáš Pařík	220:32	170	13	3.54	92.35	0
(Sweden) Hugo Alnefelt	305:44	178	14	2.75	92.13	1
(Latvia) Artūrs Šilovs	271:24	182	15	3.32	91.76	1

TOI = Time On Ice (minutes:seconds); SA = Shots against; GA = Goals against; GAA = Goals against average; Sv% = Save percentage; SO = Shutouts
Source: IIHF.com

=== Awards ===
- Best players selected by the Directorate:
  - Best Goaltender: (Russia) Yaroslav Askarov
  - Best Defenceman: (Sweden) Philip Broberg
  - Best Forward: (United States) Cole Caufield

Source: IIHF

- Media All-Stars:
  - MVP: (United States) Cole Caufield
  - Goaltender: (Russia) Yaroslav Askarov
  - Defencemen: (Sweden) Philip Broberg / (United States) Cameron York
  - Forwards: (United States) Cole Caufield / (United States) Jack Hughes / (Russia) Rodion Amirov

Source: IIHF

== Division I ==
=== Group A ===
The tournament was played in Grenoble, France, from 14 to 20 April 2019.

Pos	Team	Pld	W	OTW	OTL	L	GF	GA	GD	Pts	Promotion or relegation
1	Germany	5	5	0	0	0	38	12	+26	15	Promoted to the 2021 Top Division
2	Kazakhstan	5	3	1	0	1	23	12	+11	11	
3	Denmark	5	3	0	1	1	17	14	+3	10	
4	Norway	5	2	0	0	3	13	17	−4	6	
5	France (H)	5	0	1	0	4	12	25	−13	2	
6	Ukraine	5	0	0	1	4	7	30	−23	1	Relegated to the 2022 Division I B

Source: IIHF
Rules for classification: 1) points; 2) head-to-head points; 3) head-to-head goal difference; 4) head-to-head number of goals scored; 5) result against closest best-ranked team outside tied teams; 6) result against second-best ranked team outside tied teams; 7) seeding before tournament.
(H) Host

=== Group B ===
The tournament was played in Székesfehérvár, Hungary, from 14 to 20 April 2019.

Pos	Team	Pld	W	OTW	OTL	L	GF	GA	GD	Pts	Promotion or relegation
1	Japan	5	4	0	0	1	18	12	+6	12	Promoted to the 2022 Division I A
2	Austria	5	3	1	0	1	22	7	+15	11	
3	Hungary (H)	5	2	0	1	2	18	16	+2	7	
4	Italy	5	2	0	0	3	10	18	−8	6	
5	Slovenia	5	1	1	0	3	6	16	−10	5	
6	Great Britain	5	1	0	1	3	13	18	−5	4	Relegated to the 2022 Division II A

Source: IIHF
Rules for classification: 1) points; 2) head-to-head points; 3) head-to-head goal difference; 4) head-to-head number of goals scored; 5) result against closest best-ranked team outside tied teams; 6) result against second-best ranked team outside tied teams; 7) seeding before tournament.
(H) Host

== Division II ==
=== Group A ===
The tournament was played in Elektrėnai, Lithuania, from 7 to 13 April 2019.

Pos	Team	Pld	W	OTW	OTL	L	GF	GA	GD	Pts	Promotion or relegation
1	Poland	5	5	0	0	0	36	4	+32	15	Promoted to the 2022 Division I B
2	Lithuania (H)	5	4	0	0	1	21	15	+6	12	
3	Estonia	5	3	0	0	2	21	19	+2	9	
4	Romania	5	1	1	0	3	17	24	−7	5	
5	South Korea	5	1	0	0	4	17	19	−2	3	
6	Spain	5	0	0	1	4	6	37	−31	1	Relegated to the 2022 Division II B

Source: IIHF
(H) Host

=== Group B ===
The tournament was played in Belgrade, Serbia, from 25 to 31 March 2019.

Pos	Team	Pld	W	OTW	OTL	L	GF	GA	GD	Pts	Promotion or relegation
1	Serbia (H)	5	4	0	1	0	31	10	+21	13	Promoted to the 2022 Division II A
2	China	5	4	0	0	1	18	15	+3	12	
3	Netherlands	5	3	1	0	1	13	9	+4	11	
4	Croatia	5	2	0	0	3	16	14	+2	6	
5	Australia	5	1	0	0	4	12	21	−9	3	
6	Belgium	5	0	0	0	5	12	33	−21	0	Relegated to the 2022 Division III A

Source: IIHF
(H) Host

== Division III ==
=== Group A ===
The tournament was played in Sofia, Bulgaria, from 25 to 31 March 2019.

Pos	Team	Pld	W	OTW	OTL	L	GF	GA	GD	Pts	Promotion or relegation
1	Bulgaria (H)	5	4	1	0	0	21	11	+10	14	Promoted to the 2022 Division II B
2	Israel	5	2	1	1	1	17	13	+4	9 (Note: In head-to-head all three have 3 points, in head-to-head goal differential Israel is +1, Iceland +1, and Turkey –2. Israel defeated Iceland 4–2.)	
3	Iceland	5	3	0	0	2	23	16	+7	9	
4	Turkey	5	3	0	0	2	14	13	+1	9	
5	Mexico	5	0	1	0	4	8	20	−12	2 (Note: Mexico 5–4 (GWS) New Zealand)	
6	New Zealand	5	0	0	2	3	13	23	−10	2	Relegated to the 2022 Division III B

Source: IIHF
(H) Host

=== Group B ===
The tournament was played in Cape Town, South Africa, from 9 to 12 April 2019.

Pos	Team	Pld	W	OTW	OTL	L	GF	GA	GD	Pts	Promotion
1	Chinese Taipei	3	3	0	0	0	22	5	+17	9	Promoted to the 2022 Division III A
2	Hong Kong	3	2	0	0	1	11	15	−4	6	
3	South Africa (H)	3	0	1	0	2	13	15	−2	2	
4	Luxembourg	3	0	0	1	2	8	19	−11	1	

Source: IIHF
(H) Host
