= Rodion Amirov =

Russian ice hockey player (2001–2023)

- Born: 2 October 2001 Salavat, Russia
- Died: 14 August 2023 (aged 21) Munich, Germany
- Height: 6 ft 0 in (183 cm)
- Weight: 168 lb (76 kg; 12 st 0 lb)
- Position: Left wing
- Shot: Left
- Played for: Salavat Yulaev Ufa
- NHL draft: 15th overall, 2020; Toronto Maple Leafs
- Playing career: 2019–2021

Rodion Ruslanovich Amirov (Russian: Родион Русланович Амиров; Bashkir: Родион Руслан улы Әмиров, romanized: Rodion Ruslan ulı Ämirov; 2 October 2001 – 14 August 2023) was a Russian professional ice hockey forward who played with Salavat Yulaev Ufa in the Kontinental Hockey League (KHL). He was drafted in the first round, 15th overall by the Toronto Maple Leafs in the 2020 NHL entry draft.

== Playing career ==
Amirov played youth hockey within the system of his hometown club, Salavat Yulaev Ufa. He appeared for their Junior Hockey League (Russia) (MHL) affiliate, Tolpar Ufa, and their Supreme Hockey League (VHL) affiliate Toros Neftekamsk, before making his debut with Salavat Yulaev Ufa in the top-level Kontinental Hockey League (KHL) during the 2019–20 season. In October 2020, Amirov was selected 15th overall by the Toronto Maple Leafs in the pandemic-delayed 2020 NHL entry draft.

As a 19-year-old in his second KHL season, Amirov appeared in a career-high 39 games for Salavat Yulaev during the 2020–21 season. His nine goals and 13 points ranked third among under-20 skaters in the league. In nine playoff games, however, he did not record a point.

On 15 April 2021, Amirov agreed to a three-year entry-level contract with the Leafs. He moved to Toronto for the spring and worked with the Leafs' development staff, but did not appear in any games for the Leafs or their minor league affiliates. While in Toronto, he lived with fellow Russian Leafs prospect Semyon Der-Arguchintsev

Amirov returned to Russia for the 2021–22 season. From 29 September to 6 December 2021, he did not play any KHL games due to a shoulder injury. He recorded an assist in his return to the Ufa lineup, despite playing barely more than one minute. He did not play at all in the next two games. In 10 KHL games that season, he totaled one goal and three points.

== Illness and death ==
On 22 February 2022, Amirov's agent, Dan Milstein, announced on Twitter that Amirov had been diagnosed with a brain tumor and was undergoing treatment. The announcement shared that Amirov was receiving treatment in Germany and was skating and working out regularly. Leafs general manager Kyle Dubas confirmed the report the next day.

In the fall of 2022, Amirov received chemotherapy in Toronto, and attended the Maple Leafs' season opener against the Washington Capitals, where he was announced as an honorary member of the roster. Afterward, Amirov returned to his family home in Ufa to continue treatment. At this point, his treatment left him unable to train; according to his father Ruslan, the doctors had deemed the cancer inoperable, and Rodion was given between three and six months to live.

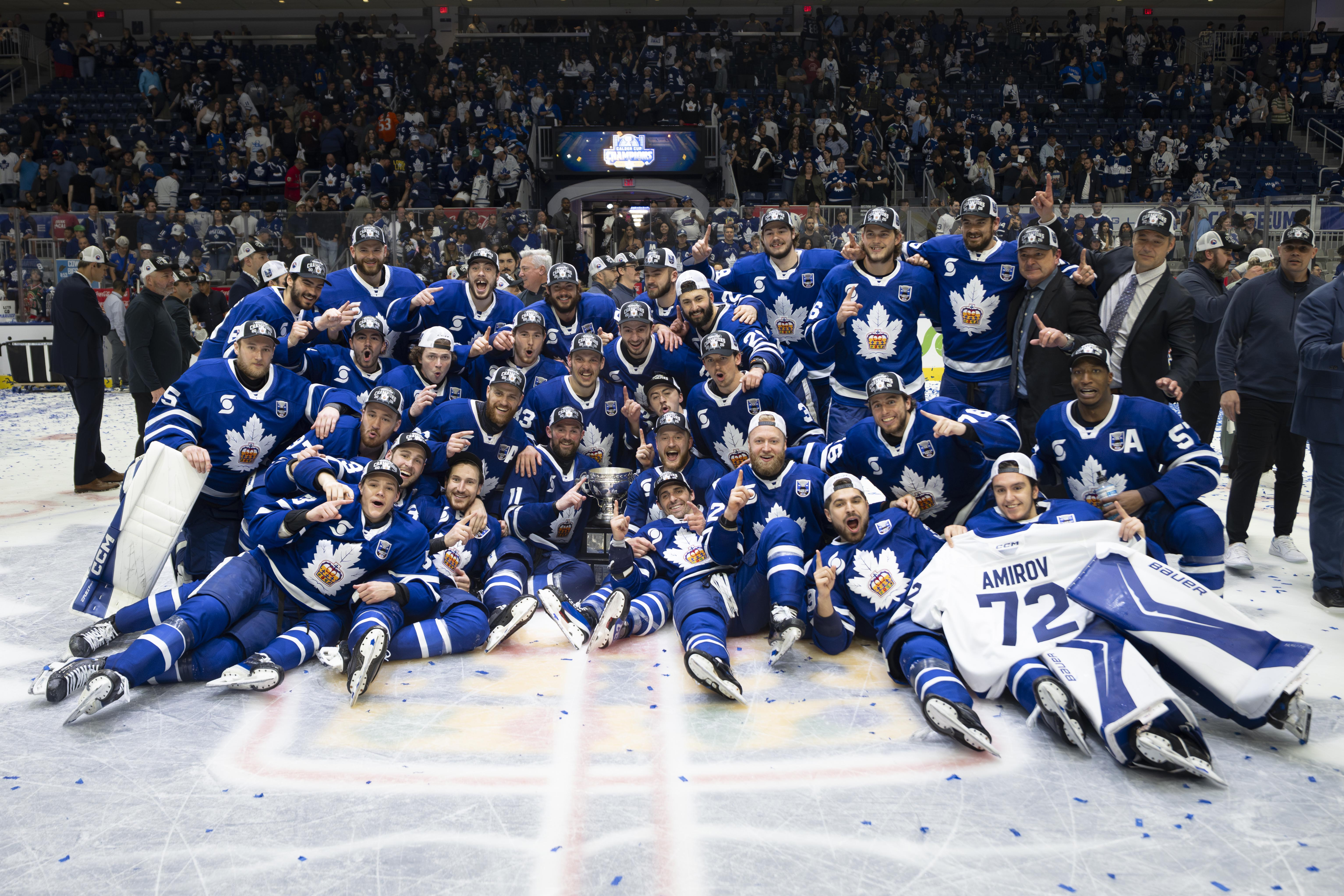
Toronto Marlies players with Amirov's jersey

For the last eight months of his life, Amirov was rendered blind from the cancer, as it had spread to his optic nerve. Despite his vision loss and his time away from hockey, Amirov signed a one-year contract extension with Salavat Yulaev on 10 May 2023. Amirov died on 14 August 2023, in Munich, Germany, where he was receiving treatment. His death was announced that day, by Milstein via X.

After the Toronto Marlies won the 2026 Calder Cup, Marlies general manager Ryan Hardy surprised the team by wearing a Marlies jersey customized in Amirov's name and number. Amirov's former teammate, Artur Akhtyamov, held the jersey while posing for the team photo with the cup.

== Career statistics ==
=== Regular season and playoffs ===
			Regular season					Playoffs
Season	Team	League	GP	G	A	Pts	PIM	GP	G	A	Pts	PIM
2017–18	Tolpar Ufa	MHL	12	2	1	3	4	2	0	0	0	0
2018–19	Tolpar Ufa	MHL	31	13	13	26	14	8	4	2	6	2
2019–20	Tolpar Ufa	MHL	17	10	12	22	31	5	1	1	2	2
2019–20	Salavat Yulaev Ufa	KHL	21	0	2	2	4	—	—	—	—	—
2019–20	Toros Neftekamsk	VHL	5	1	2	3	0	6	1	3	4	0
2020–21	Salavat Yulaev Ufa	KHL	39	9	4	13	6	9	0	0	0	6
2020–21	Toros Neftekamsk	VHL	3	1	1	2	0	—	—	—	—	—
2020–21	Tolpa Ufa	MHL	—	—	—	—	—	5	0	3	3	0
2021–22	Salavat Yulaev Ufa	KHL	10	1	2	3	0	—	—	—	—	—
2021–22	Toros Neftekamsk	VHL	3	0	0	0	0	—	—	—	—	—
KHL totals			70	10	8	18	10	9	0	0	0	6

=== International ===
Medal record

Representing Russia

Men's ice hockey

World U18 Championships
Silver medal – second place	2019 Sweden	

Year	Team	Event	Result	GP	G	A	Pts	PIM
2018	Russia	HG18	3rd place, bronze medalist(s)	5	0	2	2	0
2018	Russia	WJAC	2nd place, silver medalist(s)	6	2	1	3	0
2019	Russia	U18	2nd place, silver medalist(s)	7	6	3	9	2
2021	Russia	WJC	4th	7	2	4	6	4
Junior totals				25	10	10	20	6

== Awards and honours ==
Award	Year	Ref
International
World U18 Championship – Media All-Star Team	2019	

Awards and achievements
Preceded by Rasmus Sandin	Toronto Maple Leafs first-round draft pick 2020	Succeeded by Easton Cowan
