= Connor Zary =

Canadian ice hockey player (born 2001)

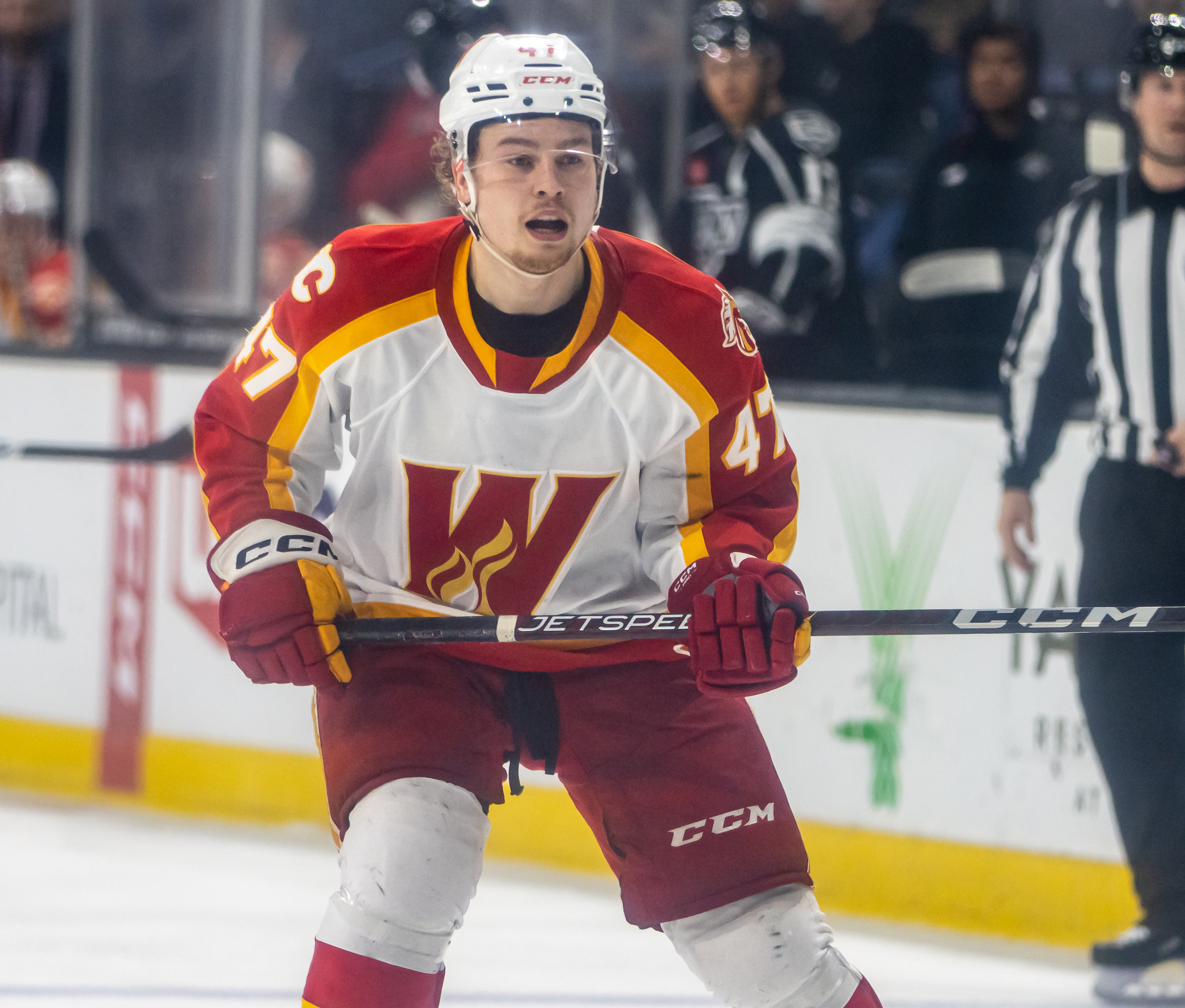
- Zary with the Calgary Wranglers in 2023
- Born: September 25, 2001 (age 25) Saskatoon, Saskatchewan, Canada
- Height: 6 ft 0 in (183 cm)
- Weight: 178 lb (81 kg; 12 st 10 lb)
- Position: Centre
- Shoots: Left
- NHL team (P) Cur. team: Calgary Flames; Calgary Wranglers (AHL)
- NHL draft: 24th overall, 2020; Calgary Flames
- Playing career: 2021–present

Connor Zary (born September 25, 2001) is a Canadian professional ice hockey player who is a centre for the Calgary Wranglers of the American Hockey League (AHL) while under contract to the Calgary Flames of the National Hockey League (NHL). Zary was selected 24th overall by the Flames in the 2020 NHL entry draft.

== Playing career ==
=== Junior ===
Following three standout seasons with the Kamloops Blazers of the Western Hockey League, Zary was widely seen as a top prospect newly eligible for the 2020 NHL entry draft. The NHL Central Scouting Bureau rated Zary as the 15th-best North American skater eligible for selection in 2020.

At the draft, which was rescheduled to October 6, 2020, from its usual date in late June, Zary was selected by the Calgary Flames with the 24th overall pick. On December 31, Zary was signed by the Flames to a three-year, entry-level contract.

=== Calgary Flames ===
On November 1, 2023, Zary made his NHL debut with the Flames, scoring his first career NHL goal in a 4–3 loss to the Dallas Stars.

During a game on March 20, 2026, Zary was removed due to a currently undisclosed injury from a game vs. the Florida Panthers. He was hooked first by A. J. Greer before subsequently boarded. Greer received a total of three penalties overall during the play, including another one for interference, along with the aforementioned penalties.

On October 5, 2026, Zary was placed on waivers by the Flames.

== Career statistics ==
Medal record

Representing Canada

Ice hockey

World Junior Championships
Silver medal – second place	2021 Canada	

=== Regular season and playoffs ===
			Regular season					Playoffs
Season	Team	League	GP	G	A	Pts	PIM	GP	G	A	Pts	PIM
2017–18	Kamloops Blazers	WHL	68	11	18	29	26	—	—	—	—	—
2018–19	Kamloops Blazers	WHL	63	24	43	67	55	4	3	1	4	6
2019–20	Kamloops Blazers	WHL	57	38	48	86	51	—	—	—	—	—
2020–21	Stockton Heat	AHL	9	3	4	7	4	—	—	—	—	—
2020–21	Kamloops Blazers	WHL	15	6	18	24	35	—	—	—	—	—
2021–22	Stockton Heat	AHL	53	13	12	25	36	13	1	1	2	4
2022–23	Calgary Wranglers	AHL	72	21	37	58	63	9	1	3	4	4
2023–24	Calgary Wranglers	AHL	6	1	9	10	2	—	—	—	—	—
2023–24	Calgary Flames	NHL	63	14	20	34	22	—	—	—	—	—
2024–25	Calgary Flames	NHL	54	13	14	27	14	—	—	—	—	—
2025–26	Calgary Flames	NHL	74	12	13	25	22	—	—	—	—	—
NHL totals			191	39	47	86	58	—	—	—	—	—

=== International ===
Year	Team	Event	Result	GP	G	A	Pts	PIM
2019	Canada	U18	4th	7	4	3	7	6
2021	Canada	WJC	2nd place, silver medalist(s)	7	0	2	2	2
Junior totals				14	4	5	9	8

Awards and achievements
Preceded by Jakob Pelletier	Calgary Flames' first-round draft pick 2020	Succeeded by Matthew Coronato
