= Brayden Tracey =

Canadian ice hockey player (born 2001)

- Born: May 28, 2001 (age 25) Calgary, Alberta, Canada
- Height: 6 ft 0 in (183 cm)
- Weight: 186 lb (84 kg; 13 st 4 lb)
- Position: Left wing
- Shoots: Left
- Allsv team Former teams: Mora IK; Anaheim Ducks; Jukurit; HC Slovan Bratislava
- NHL draft: 29th overall, 2019; Anaheim Ducks
- Playing career: 2021–present

Brayden Tracey (born May 28, 2001) is a Canadian professional ice hockey winger who currently plays for Mora IK in the HockeyAllsvenskan (Allsv). He has previously played with the Anaheim Ducks of the National Hockey League (NHL).

== Playing career ==
Tracey played his Midget AAA hockey with the Calgary Northstars. He was selected by the Moose Jaw Warriors of the Western Hockey League (WHL) in the first round, 21st overall, of the 2016 WHL bantam draft. He made two appearances in the 2018 WHL playoffs for the Warriors before establishing himself as a regular on the Warriors in the 2018–19 WHL season, scoring a 36 goals to lead all WHL rookies and 81 points, leading all rookies across the Canadian Hockey League in 66 games. He was named the Eastern Conference Rookie of the Year and WHL Rookie of the Year. He returned to Moose Jaw for the 2019–20 WHL season, where he was named an alternate captain by the team. He appeared in 28 games with the Warriors, registering 38 points, before being traded to the Victoria Royals on January 9, 2020. However, due to the pandemic, the WHL playoffs were cancelled that season. He finished the season with 23 points in 24 games with Victoria. The following season was also abbreviated due to the pandemic, and Tracey, who had spent the first part of the year in the American Hockey League (AHL), returned to join the Royals. In 22 games with the Royals, he scored 21 points.

He was selected by the Anaheim Ducks of the National Hockey League (NHL) in the first round, 29th overall, in the 2019 NHL entry draft. Tracey signed a three-year, entry-level contract with the Ducks on November 28, 2019. After the postponement of the 2020–21 WHL season, Tracey joined Anaheim's AHL affiliate, the San Diego Gulls to begin the season. He appeared in 12 games with the Gulls, going scoreless. He was assigned to the Gulls for the 2021–22 season and was named the AHL's player of the week in late November. Tracey was recalled by Anaheim on January 9, 2022, while leading the Gulls in goals with nine and points with 21. He played in his first NHL game that night against the Detroit Red Wings, finishing the game with one shot on goal in 9:21 of ice time. He was returned to the Gulls and his play dipped, only scoring two goals and five points in the final 23 games. During the 2022–23 season, Tracey played in 62 games for the Gulls, scoring 10 goals and 28 points. Tracey was assigned to San Diego at the start of the 2023–24 season. He played the entire season with San Diego. A restricted free agent at the end of the season, he was not offered a qualifying offer by the Ducks and became an unrestricted free agent on July 1, 2024.

Left un-signed leading into the 2024–25 season, Tracey was belatedly signed to a professional tryout contract with the Bakersfield Condors of the AHL, the primary affiliate to the Edmonton Oilers, on November 5, 2024. He was scoreless through only four appearances with the Condors before he was released from his PTO on November 13, 2024.

On December 7, 2024, Tracey signed a contract to play the remainder of the 2024–25 season abroad with Jukurit in the Finnish Liiga. He contributed with 6 points through 13 appearances before leaving and joining his third team in the season with Slovakian club, HC Slovan Bratislava of the Slovak Extraliga on February 12, 2025.

== Career statistics ==
=== Regular season and playoffs ===
			Regular season					Playoffs
Season	Team	League	GP	G	A	Pts	PIM	GP	G	A	Pts	PIM
2016–17	Calgary Northstars	AMHL	28	8	11	19	20	5	1	2	3	0
2017–18	Calgary Northstars	AMHL	30	21	31	52	40	4	2	2	4	6
2017–18	Moose Jaw Warriors	WHL	5	0	2	2	0	2	0	0	0	0
2018–19	Moose Jaw Warriors	WHL	66	36	45	81	28	2	0	1	1	4
2019–20	Moose Jaw Warriors	WHL	28	15	23	38	39	—	—	—	—	—
2019–20	Victoria Royals	WHL	24	7	16	23	25	—	—	—	—	—
2020–21	San Diego Gulls	AHL	12	0	0	0	4	—	—	—	—	—
2020–21	Victoria Royals	WHL	22	9	12	21	24	—	—	—	—	—
2021–22	San Diego Gulls	AHL	55	11	20	31	40	2	0	0	0	2
2021–22	Anaheim Ducks	NHL	1	0	0	0	0	—	—	—	—	—
2022–23	San Diego Gulls	AHL	62	10	18	28	40	—	—	—	—	—
2023–24	San Diego Gulls	AHL	55	9	16	25	32	—	—	—	—	—
2024–25	Bakersfield Condors	AHL	4	0	0	0	2	—	—	—	—	—
2024–25	Jukurit	Liiga	13	1	5	6	4	—	—	—	—	—
2024–25	HC Slovan Bratislava	Slovak	7	2	2	4	2	4	2	2	4	6
2025–26	Mora IK	Allsv	30	4	7	11	12	2	0	0	0	0
NHL totals			1	0	0	0	0	—	—	—	—	—

=== International ===
Year	Team	Event	Result	GP	G	A	Pts	PIM
2017	Canada Red	U17	2nd place, silver medalist(s)	6	0	0	0	2
2019	Canada	U18	4th	7	4	3	7	8
Junior totals				13	4	3	7	10

Awards and achievements
Preceded by Trevor Zegras	Anaheim Ducks first-round draft pick 2019	Succeeded by Jamie Drysdale
