= Hugo Alnefelt =

Swedish ice hockey player

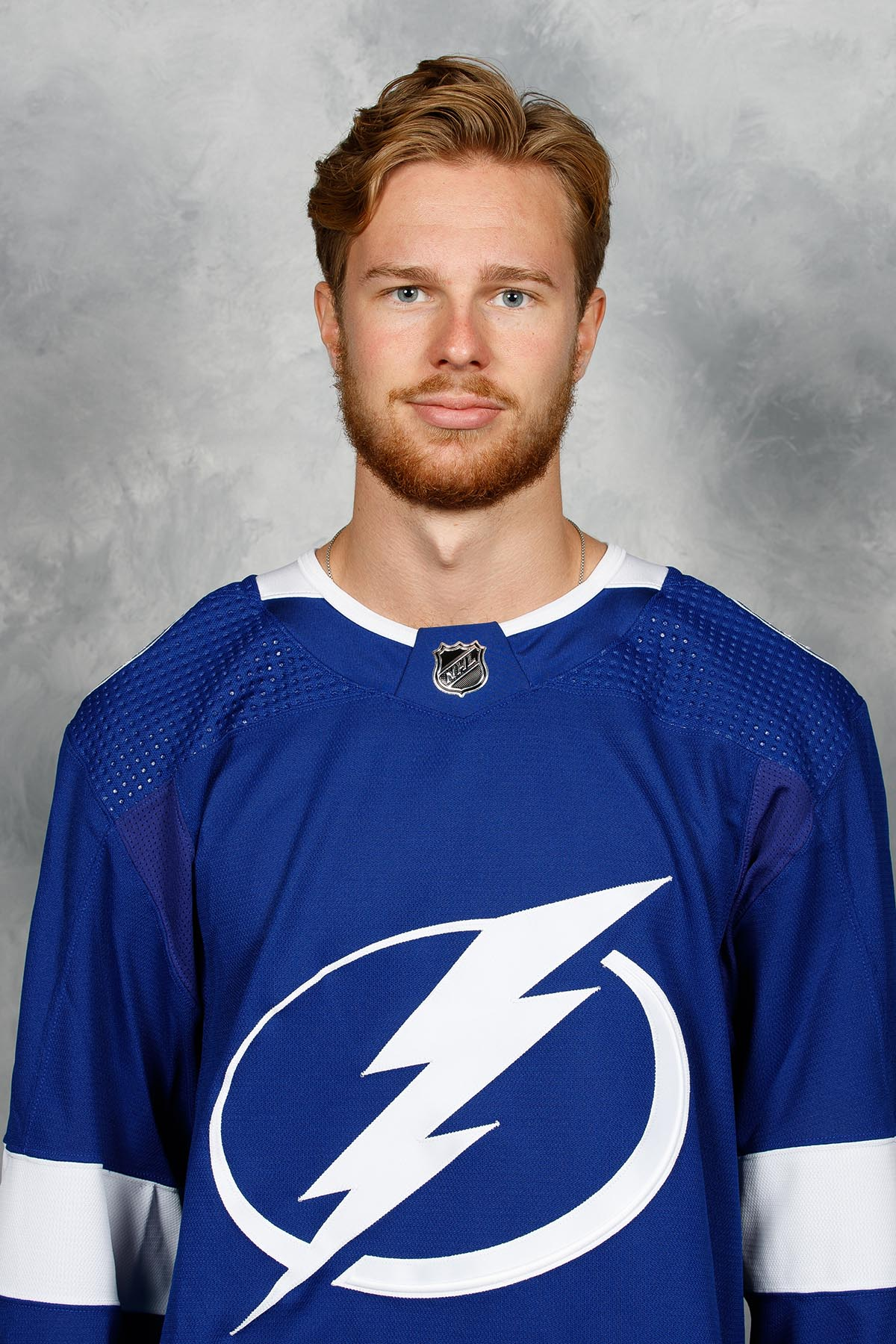
- Alnefelt with the Tampa Bay Lightning in 2021
- Born: 4 June 2001 (age 25) Danderyd, Sweden
- Height: 191 cm (6 ft 3 in)
- Weight: 85.7 kg (189 lb; 13 st 7 lb)
- Position: Goaltender
- Catches: Left
- Liiga team Former teams: HIFK; HV71; Tampa Bay Lightning
- NHL draft: 71st overall, 2019; Tampa Bay Lightning
- Playing career: 2019–present

Hugo Alnefelt (born 4 June 2001) is a Swedish professional ice hockey goaltender. He currently plays for the HIFK of the Finnish Elite League (Liiga). Alnefelt was drafted by the Tampa Bay Lightning in the 2019 NHL entry draft with the 71st overall selection, and appeared in one game with the Lightning.

== Playing career ==
Alnefelt was drafted in the third round, 71st overall, of the 2019 NHL entry draft by the Tampa Bay Lightning. This pick was initially acquired from the Vancouver Canucks as a part of the J. T. Miller trade. On 1 May 2021, the Tampa Bay Lightning signed Alnefelt to a three-year, entry-level contract.

With both of the Lightning’s regular goalies, starter Andrei Vasilevskiy and backup Brian Elliott out sick due to COVID, the Lightning recalled Alnefelt and fellow goalie Maxime Lagacé from Syracuse on 27 December 2021. Lagacé, with prior NHL experience, played for the Lightning the next day against the Montreal Canadiens in a 5–4 overtime Lightning win. Lagacé started again on 30 December against the Florida Panthers, but was pulled after the second period, letting in 6 goals on 27 shots. Alnefelt made his NHL debut, playing the third period in relief. Alnefelt allowed 3 goals on 10 shots, as the Lightning lost 9–3. Following the game, RotoWire Staff analyzed Alnefelt as “a decent prospect, but he clearly needs more development time in the AHL.”

Alnefelt was named AHL Player of the Week for the period ending 29 January 2023 after posting a 0.50 goals-against average and a .988 save percentage, including recording a 51-save shutout against the Providence Bruins on 29 January 2023.

Following three seasons within the Lightning organization and as an impending restricted free agent, Alnefelt opted to return to his native Sweden in signing a three-year contract with his original club, HV71 of the SHL, on 11 June 2024.

== Career statistics ==
=== Regular season and playoffs ===
| | | | Regular season | | | | | | | | | Playoffs |
| Season | Team | League | GP | W | L | OT | MIN | GA | SO | GAA | SV% | GP | W | L | MIN | GA | SO | GAA | SV% |
|---|---|---|---|---|---|---|---|---|---|---|---|---|---|---|---|---|---|---|---|
| 2017–18 | HV71 | J20 | 4 | — | — | — | — | — | — | 3.54 | .870 | — | — | — | — | — | — | — | — |
| 2018–19 | HV71 | J20 | 24 | 14 | 10 | 0 | 1,435 | 62 | 1 | 2.59 | .905 | 3 | 1 | 2 | 194 | 10 | 0 | 3.09 | .894 |
| 2019–20 | HV71 | J20 | 4 | 3 | 1 | 0 | 244 | 12 | 0 | 2.95 | .903 | — | — | — | — | — | — | — | — |
| 2019–20 | HV71 | SHL | 18 | 8 | 5 | 4 | 1,050 | 45 | 0 | 2.57 | .905 | — | — | — | — | — | — | — | — |
| 2020–21 | HV71 | SHL | 22 | 5 | 16 | 0 | 1,232 | 65 | 0 | 3.16 | .904 | — | — | — | — | — | — | — | — |
| 2021–22 | Syracuse Crunch | AHL | 23 | 10 | 7 | 4 | 1,278 | 67 | 0 | 3.14 | .882 | 1 | 0 | 0 | 50 | 0 | 0 | 0.00 | 1.000 |
| 2021–22 | Orlando Solar Bears | ECHL | 2 | 0 | 2 | 0 | 85 | 5 | 0 | 3.51 | .886 | — | — | — | — | — | — | — | — |
| 2021–22 | Tampa Bay Lightning | NHL | 1 | 0 | 0 | 0 | 20 | 3 | 0 | 9.00 | .700 | — | — | — | — | — | — | — | — |
| 2022–23 | Syracuse Crunch | AHL | 33 | 17 | 12 | 2 | 1,820 | 84 | 3 | 2.77 | .904 | 1 | 0 | 1 | 34 | 1 | 0 | 1.73 | .900 |
| 2023–24 | Syracuse Crunch | AHL | 30 | 14 | 8 | 4 | 1,654 | 76 | 2 | 2.76 | .893 | — | — | — | — | — | — | — | — |
| 2024–25 | HV71 | SHL | 28 | 8 | 16 | 0 | 1,516 | 76 | 2 | 3.01 | .899 | — | — | — | — | — | — | — | — |
| 2025–26 | HIFK | Liiga | 29 | 15 | 10 | 2 | 1,581 | 70 | 4 | 2.66 | .878 | 5 | 2 | 3 | 314 | 11 | 1 | 2.10 | .902 |
| SHL totals | | | 68 | 21 | 37 | 4 | 3,798 | 186 | 2 | 2.94 | .902 | — | — | — | — | — | — | — | — |
| NHL totals | | | 1 | 0 | 0 | 0 | 20 | 3 | 0 | 9.00 | .700 | — | — | — | — | — | — | — | — |

Medal record

Representing Sweden

Ice hockey

World Junior Championships
| Bronze medal – third place | 2020 Czech Republic | |

World U18 Championships
| Gold medal – first place | 2019 Sweden | |

=== International ===
| Year | Team | Event | Result | GP | W | L | OT | MIN | GA | SO | GAA | SV% |
|---|---|---|---|---|---|---|---|---|---|---|---|---|
| 2018 | Sweden | IH18 | 2nd place, silver medalist(s) | 3 | 2 | 1 | 0 | 180 | 7 | 1 | 2.33 | .922 |
| 2019 | Sweden | U18 | 1st place, gold medalist(s) | 5 | 4 | 1 | 0 | 305 | 14 | 1 | 2.75 | .921 |
| 2020 | Sweden | WJC | 3rd place, bronze medalist(s) | 6 | 5 | 1 | 0 | 368 | 13 | 1 | 2.12 | .924 |
| 2021 | Sweden | WJC | 5th | 4 | 2 | 2 | 0 | 203 | 8 | 1 | 2.36 | .902 |
| Junior totals | | | | 18 | 13 | 5 | 0 | 1,056 | 42 | 4 | 2.38 | .921 |
