= Cam York =

American ice hockey player (born 2001)

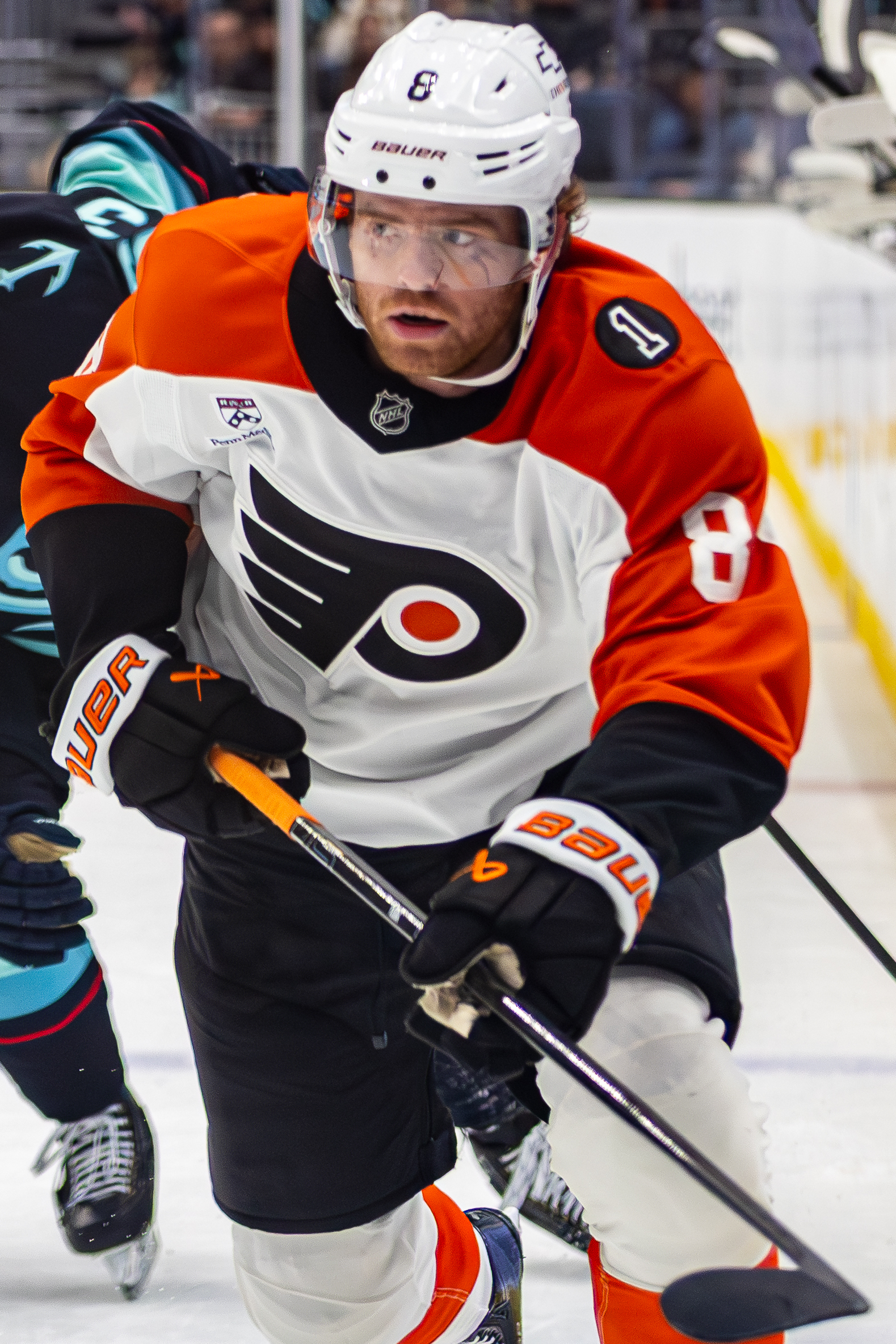
- York with the Philadelphia Flyers in December 2025
- Born: January 5, 2001 (age 25) Anaheim Hills, California, U.S.
- Height: 6 ft 0 in (183 cm)
- Weight: 194 lb (88 kg; 13 st 12 lb)
- Position: Defense
- Shoots: Left
- NHL team: Philadelphia Flyers
- NHL draft: 14th overall, 2019; Philadelphia Flyers
- Playing career: 2021–present

Cameron York (born January 5, 2001) is an American professional ice hockey player who is a defenseman for the Philadelphia Flyers of the National Hockey League (NHL). He was drafted 14th overall by the Flyers in the first round of the 2019 NHL entry draft. Before being selected by the Flyers, York played ice hockey at Shattuck-St. Mary's and in the U.S. National Development Program.

== Early life ==
York was born and raised in Anaheim, California. Growing up there, he played alongside Jackson Niedermayer, the son of Scott Niedermayer, who coached his youth hockey team. His father, Jeff, installed a roller skating rink surface in the backyard which York would skate on every day after school. It was through roller skating that York developed an affinity for hockey. After two defensemen on his youth team were injured, he was placed on defense and enjoyed the position. York played squirt and peewee hockey within the Anaheim Jr. Ducks minor program coached by Craig Johnson and Scott Niedermayer. Growing up, York's favorite team was the hometown Anaheim Ducks; he would frequently attend games and cites the Ducks' 2007 Stanley Cup victory as a catalyst for excelling at his own hockey career.

Once he turned 14, York enrolled in Shattuck-Saint Mary's, a Minnesota prep academy, where he totaled more than 100 points in two seasons. Afterwards, York was invited to the USA Hockey National Team Development Program in the USHL. While playing for the USA Hockey National Team Development Program U-18 team in the 2018–19 USHL season, York set a new single season record for points for a defenseman. On January 15, 2019, York set a new franchise record for most points in one game with seven. This earned him USHL's Defenseman of the Week Honors.

== Playing career ==
=== College ===
York was initially committed to play for the Boston College Eagles, but rescinded his commitment when coach Greg Brown left to join the New York Rangers. He eventually committed to play for the Michigan Wolverines.

York was drafted 14th overall by the Philadelphia Flyers in the first round of the 2019 NHL entry draft. He enrolled in the University of Michigan for the 2019–20 season and recorded his first collegiate goal in a 2–1 loss to Ohio State on November 2, 2019.

During the 2020–21 season, York led the Big Ten in defenseman scoring with 20 points on four goals and 16 assists. Five of his 20 points came on the power play, while four of his assists set up game-winning goals. Following an outstanding season, he was named Big Ten Defensive Player of the Year and First Team All-Big Ten.

=== Professional ===
On March 31, 2021, the Flyers signed York to a three-year, entry-level contract. York made his NHL debut on May 7 in the Flyers' 4–2 win over the Washington Capitals. On January 8, 2022, York recorded his first NHL point with an assist to James van Riemsdyk as the Flyers won 3–2 in overtime against the San Jose Sharks. He scored his first NHL goal in a 3–2 loss to the New York Rangers on January 15.

York signed a two-year contract with the Flyers on July 10, 2023.

On March 25, 2025, York dressed for the Flyers game against the Toronto Maple Leafs, but was benched for the final 50 minutes. It was later reported that York and head coach John Tortorella got into a verbal altercation after the game in which the two "both crossed a line." Tortorella was fired two days later due to the altercation as well as comments he had made regarding the team. York dressed for the team's game that night, but was benched for the entire contest.

York agreed to a five-year contract with the Flyers on July 7, 2025. In game 6 of the first round of the 2026 Stanley Cup playoffs against rivals Pittsburgh Penguins, York scored the series-winning goal in overtime. York threw his stick into the crowd in celebration, but it was later returned to him by a fan to keep as memorabilia.

== International play ==
Medal record

Men's ice hockey

Representing the United States

World Junior Championship
| Gold medal – first place | 2021 Canada | |

World U18 Championship
| Silver medal – second place | 2018 Russia | |
| Bronze medal – third place | 2019 Sweden | |

On April 4, 2018, York was selected to compete for Team USA at the 2018 IIHF World U18 Championships. He recorded 6 points and was named to the Media All-Star Team as Team USA won a silver medal.

York was again selected to compete for Team USA at the 2019 IIHF World U18 Championships on April 11, 2019. During the tournament, he set a new scoring record for defenseman in U18 Men's World Championship history. His 17 points collected during the 2018 and 19 series helped earn him the honor of Three Best Players of the tournament for Team USA, U.S. Player of the Game, and a bronze medal.

== Career statistics ==
=== Regular season and playoffs ===
| | | | Regular season | | | | | Playoffs |
| Season | Team | League | GP | G | A | Pts | PIM | GP | G | A | Pts | PIM |
|---|---|---|---|---|---|---|---|---|---|---|---|---|
| 2016–17 | Shattuck-Saint Mary's | USHS | 54 | 9 | 39 | 48 | 6 | — | — | — | — | — |
| 2017–18 | U.S. National Development Team | USHL | 33 | 3 | 11 | 14 | 12 | — | — | — | — | — |
| 2018–19 | U.S. National Development Team | USHL | 28 | 7 | 26 | 33 | 12 | — | — | — | — | — |
| 2019–20 | University of Michigan | B1G | 30 | 5 | 11 | 16 | 10 | — | — | — | — | — |
| 2020–21 | University of Michigan | B1G | 24 | 4 | 16 | 20 | 4 | — | — | — | — | — |
| 2020–21 | Lehigh Valley Phantoms | AHL | 8 | 2 | 3 | 5 | 4 | — | — | — | — | — |
| 2020–21 | Philadelphia Flyers | NHL | 3 | 0 | 0 | 0 | 0 | — | — | — | — | — |
| 2021–22 | Lehigh Valley Phantoms | AHL | 34 | 2 | 10 | 12 | 12 | — | — | — | — | — |
| 2021–22 | Philadelphia Flyers | NHL | 30 | 3 | 7 | 10 | 6 | — | — | — | — | — |
| 2022–23 | Lehigh Valley Phantoms | AHL | 20 | 3 | 10 | 13 | 4 | — | — | — | — | — |
| 2022–23 | Philadelphia Flyers | NHL | 54 | 2 | 18 | 20 | 18 | — | — | — | — | — |
| 2023–24 | Philadelphia Flyers | NHL | 82 | 10 | 20 | 30 | 44 | — | — | — | — | — |
| 2024–25 | Philadelphia Flyers | NHL | 66 | 4 | 13 | 17 | 26 | — | — | — | — | — |
| 2025–26 | Philadelphia Flyers | NHL | 74 | 4 | 22 | 26 | 28 | 10 | 1 | 1 | 2 | 6 |
| NHL totals | | | 309 | 23 | 80 | 103 | 122 | 10 | 1 | 1 | 2 | 6 |

=== International ===
| Year | Team | Event | Result | GP | G | A | Pts | PIM |
|---|---|---|---|---|---|---|---|---|
| 2017 | United States | U17 | 1st place, gold medalist(s) | 6 | 1 | 4 | 5 | 4 |
| 2018 | United States | U18 | 2nd place, silver medalist(s) | 7 | 0 | 6 | 6 | 0 |
| 2019 | United States | U18 | 3rd place, bronze medalist(s) | 7 | 4 | 7 | 11 | 0 |
| 2020 | United States | WJC | 6th | 5 | 0 | 0 | 0 | 2 |
| 2021 | United States | WJC | 1st place, gold medalist(s) | 7 | 1 | 5 | 6 | 0 |
| Junior totals | | | | 32 | 6 | 22 | 28 | 6 |

== Awards and honors ==
| Award | Year | Ref |
College
| Big Ten Defensive Player of the Year | 2021 | |
| All-Big Ten First Team | 2021 | |
| AHCA West First Team All-American | 2021 | |
International
| World U18 Championship Media All-Star Team | 2018, 2019 | |

Awards and achievements
| Preceded by Jay O'Brien | Philadelphia Flyers first-round draft pick 2019 | Succeeded by Tyson Foerster |
| Preceded by Cole Hults | Big Ten Defensive Player of the Year; 2020–21 | Succeeded by Brock Faber |
