= Zion Nybeck =

Swedish ice hockey player (born 2002)

- Born: 12 May 2002 (age 24) Alvesta, Sweden
- Height: 5 ft 8 in (173 cm)
- Weight: 182 lb (83 kg; 13 st 0 lb)
- Position: Winger
- Shoots: Left
- SHL team Former teams: Linköping HC; HV71
- NHL draft: 115th overall, 2020; Carolina Hurricanes
- Playing career: 2019–present

Zion Nybeck (born 12 May 2002) is a Swedish professional ice hockey winger currently playing for Linköping HC of the Swedish Hockey League (SHL). Nybeck was drafted in the fourth round, 115th overall, by the Carolina Hurricanes in the 2020 NHL entry draft.

== Playing career ==
Nybeck made his Swedish Hockey League (SHL) debut with HV71 during the 2019–20 season.

After helping HV71 return to the SHL after one season in the HockeyAllsvenskan in 2021–22, Nybeck left HV71 to remain in the Allsvenskan in signing a one-year contract with AIK IF on 9 May 2022.

Nybeck played a lone season with IK Oskarshamn before returning to the SHL in securing a two-year contract with Linköping HC on 2 April 2025.

== Career statistics ==
=== Regular season and playoffs ===
			Regular season					Playoffs
Season	Team	League	GP	G	A	Pts	PIM	GP	G	A	Pts	PIM
2018–19	HV71	J20	35	17	26	43	0	3	1	0	1	0
2019–20	HV71	J20	42	27	39	66	28	—	—	—	—	—
2019–20	HV71	SHL	15	1	0	1	0	—	—	—	—	—
2020–21	HV71	SHL	39	1	6	7	6	—	—	—	—	—
2020–21	HV71	J20	4	5	3	8	4	—	—	—	—	—
2020–21	Almtuna IS	Allsv	3	3	2	5	0	—	—	—	—	—
2021–22	HV71	Allsv	22	3	8	11	2	5	0	1	1	0
2021–22	HV71	J20	—	—	—	—	—	4	2	2	4	0
2022–23	AIK IF	Allsv	50	13	21	34	8	8	3	3	6	0
2023–24	AIK IF	Allsv	52	17	27	44	12	6	3	2	5	4
2024–25	IK Oskarshamn	Allsv	48	18	35	53	41	8	1	5	6	2
SHL totals			54	2	6	8	6	—	—	—	—	—

Medal record

Representing Sweden

Ice hockey

World U18 Championships
Gold medal – first place	2019 Sweden	

=== International ===
Year	Team	Event	Result	GP	G	A	Pts	PIM
2019	Sweden	U17	5th	6	3	0	3	0
2019	Sweden	U18	1st place, gold medalist(s)	7	2	3	5	2
2021	Sweden	WJC	5th	5	0	1	1	0
Junior totals				18	5	4	9	2
