= Karl Henriksson =

Swedish ice hockey player

- Born: 5 February 2001 (age 25) Malmö, Sweden
- Height: 175 cm (5 ft 9 in)
- Weight: 80.7 kg (178 lb; 12 st 10 lb)
- Position: Centre
- Shoots: Left
- SHL team Former teams: Växjö Lakers; Frölunda HC
- NHL draft: 58th overall, 2019; New York Rangers
- Playing career: 2019–present

Karl Henriksson (born 5 February 2001) is a Swedish ice hockey centre for the Växjö Lakers of the Swedish Hockey League (SHL). He was selected in the second round, 58th overall pick, of the 2019 NHL entry draft by the New York Rangers.

== Playing career ==
In the 2018–19 season, Henriksson led Frölunda HC J20 in scoring with 49 points on 13 goals and 36 assists. He also played in two games for Frölunda HC of the Swedish Hockey League in 2018–19 without picking up a point. In the 2019 NHL entry draft, Henriksson was selected with the 58th overall pick by the New York Rangers. On 26 March 2020, he signed a two-year contract extension with Frölunda HC. During the 2020–21 season, he recorded one goal and seven assists in 44 games with Frölunda HC during the regular season, and appeared in four playoff games with the team. On 21 April 2021, Henriksson signed a three-year, entry-level contract with the New York Rangers.

Frölunda's director of player development, Mikael Ström, described Henriksson as a player who elevates his teammates' performance. He explained that "always makes other guys better. Everyone wants to play with Karl because they know, of course, he's a really good stick-handler and he can score. But he also works hard every shift and he has a smartness on the ice. He sees other guys – and I think he sees other guys one step before anyone else can see them."

After spending two seasons playing for the Hartford Wolf Pack, the AHL affiliate of the Rangers, Henriksson returned to Sweden and inked a three-year deal with the Växjö Lakers on June 13, 2024.

== Career statistics ==
=== Regular season and playoffs ===
			Regular season					Playoffs
Season	Team	League	GP	G	A	Pts	PIM	GP	G	A	Pts	PIM
2016–17	Karlskrona HK	J20	10	0	0	0	2	—	—	—	—	—
2017–18	Frölunda HC	J20	5	0	0	0	0	—	—	—	—	—
2018–19	Frölunda HC	J20	45	13	36	49	26	6	2	7	9	4
2018–19	Frölunda HC	SHL	2	0	0	0	0	—	—	—	—	—
2019–20	Frölunda HC	J20	27	6	35	41	8	—	—	—	—	—
2019–20	Frölunda HC	SHL	8	0	1	1	0	—	—	—	—	—
2019–20	Södertälje SK	Allsv	15	0	1	1	10	—	—	—	—	—
2020–21	Frölunda HC	SHL	44	1	6	7	18	4	0	0	0	0
2021–22	Frölunda HC	SHL	40	3	6	9	8	9	2	1	3	0
2022–23	Hartford Wolf Pack	AHL	70	7	10	17	20	8	0	0	0	4
2023–24	Hartford Wolf Pack	AHL	64	11	12	23	12	—	—	—	—	—
2024–25	Växjö Lakers	SHL	36	9	5	14	10	8	2	0	2	24
2025–26	Växjö Lakers	SHL	49	12	7	19	49	10	2	4	6	0
SHL totals			179	25	25	50	85	31	6	5	11	24

Medal record

Representing Sweden

Ice hockey

World U18 Championships
Gold medal – first place	2019 Sweden	

World Junior Championships
Bronze medal – third place	2020 Czech Republic	

=== International ===
Year	Team	Event	Result	GP	G	A	Pts	PIM
2019	Sweden	U18	1st place, gold medalist(s)	7	3	6	9	2
2020	Sweden	WJC	3rd place, bronze medalist(s)	7	1	2	3	2
Junior totals				14	4	8	12	4
