= Antti Saarela =

Finnish ice hockey player

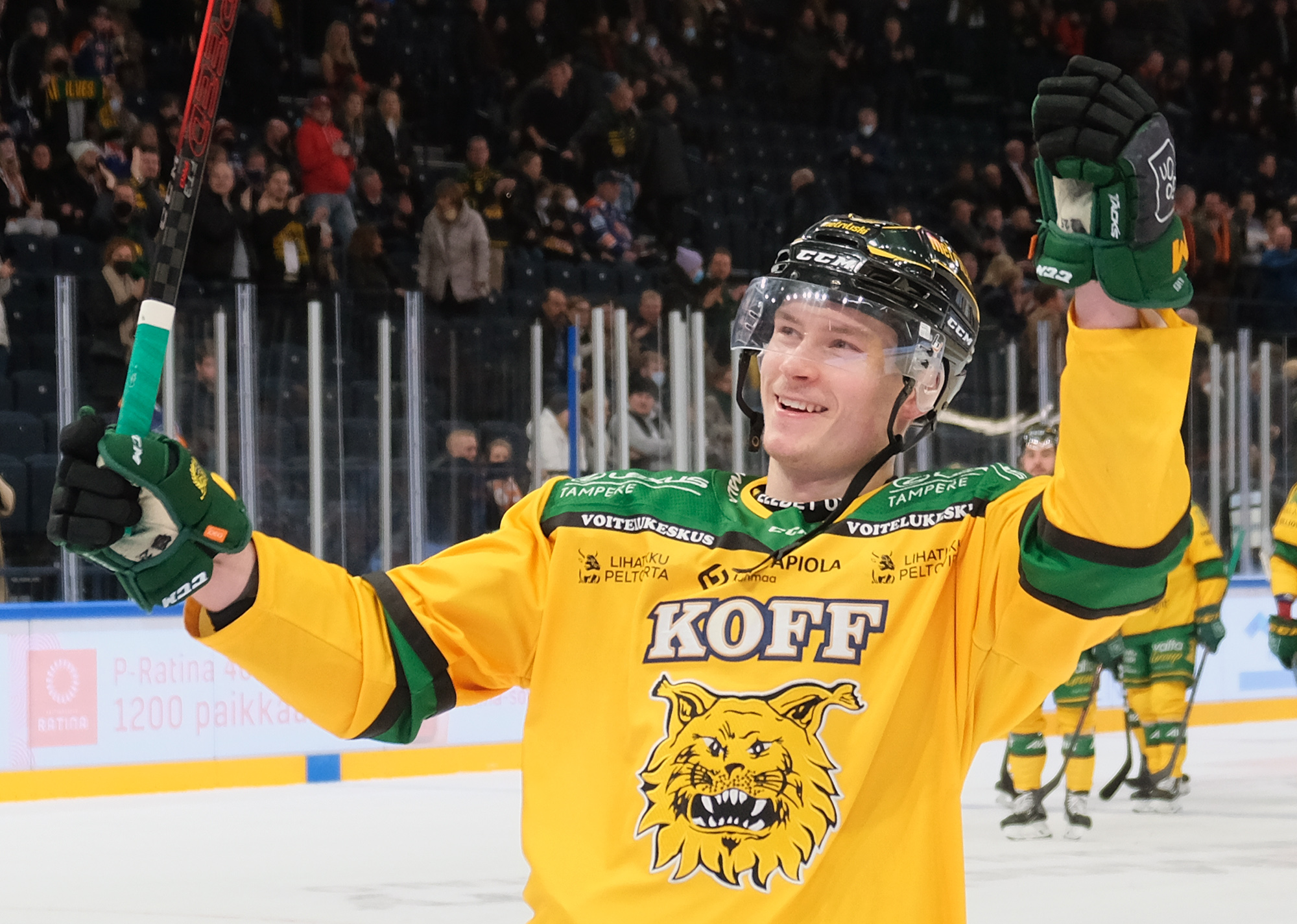
- Born: 27 June 2001 (age 25) Laitila, Finland
- Height: 5 ft 11 in (180 cm)
- Weight: 183 lb (83 kg; 13 st 1 lb)
- Position: Winger
- Shoots: Left
- Liiga team Former teams: Lukko; Ilves
- NHL draft: 123rd overall, 2019; Chicago Blackhawks
- Playing career: 2018–present

Antti Saarela (born June 27, 2001) is a Finnish professional ice hockey winger playing with Lukko in the Liiga. He was drafted 123rd overall by the Chicago Blackhawks in the 2019 NHL entry draft.

== Playing career ==
Saarela made his Liiga debut for Lukko, playing one game during the 2017–18 Liiga season. He followed up by playing in twenty-four regular season games for Lukko during the 2018–19 Liiga season, scoring two goals and eight assists for ten points. On April 3, 2019, Saarela signed an optional three-year contract for fellow Liiga club, Ilves.

After his contract with Ilves, Saarela returned to his original club, Lukko, agreeing to a one-year contract on 30 April 2022.

Following the conclusion of the 2022–23 season with Lukko, Saarela was signed by the Chicago Blackhawks to a two-year, entry-level contract on 28 March 2023.

In the 2023–24 season, Saarela moved to North America and played exclusively with the Blackhawks AHL affiliate, the Rockford IceHogs. With the campaign blighted by injury, he posted 5 goals and 6 points through just 27 appearances.

On 18 July 2024, Saarela was loaned by the Blackhawks to return to former club Lukko of the Liiga to continue his development for the 2024–25 season. After the season, Saarela was not tendered a qualifying offer to remain within the Blackhawks organization, continuing his tenure permanently with Lukko in the Liiga.

== Personal ==
His father, Pasi Saarela, was a professional hockey player who enjoyed a lengthy career in the SM-liiga, most notably as a star player for local club, Lukko. Antti was also coached through his junior career by Pasi at Lukko. His older brother Aleksi is also a professional hockey player playing with the Florida Panthers in the National Hockey League.

== Career statistics ==
=== Regular season and playoffs ===
			Regular season					Playoffs
Season	Team	League	GP	G	A	Pts	PIM	GP	G	A	Pts	PIM
2017–18	Lukko	Jr. A	25	6	9	15	6	—	—	—	—	—
2017–18	Lukko	Liiga	1	0	0	0	0	—	—	—	—	—
2018–19	Lukko	Jr. A	21	7	8	15	32	—	—	—	—	—
2018–19	Lukko	Liiga	24	2	8	10	20	4	0	0	0	0
2019–20	Ilves	Liiga	40	4	8	12	12	—	—	—	—	—
2020–21	Ilves	Liiga	47	7	7	14	51	5	0	3	3	4
2021–22	Ilves	Liiga	37	12	7	19	24	—	—	—	—	—
2022–23	Lukko	Liiga	41	7	11	18	10	6	2	0	2	2
2023–24	Rockford IceHogs	AHL	27	5	1	6	11	—	—	—	—	—
2024–25	Lukko	Liiga	59	12	19	31	39	8	2	2	4	4
Liiga totals			249	44	60	104	156	23	4	5	9	10

=== International ===
Year	Team	Event	Result	GP	G	A	Pts	PIM
2017	Finland	U17	6th	5	2	2	4	4
2018	Finland	HG18	7th	3	0	0	0	2
2019	Finland	U18	7th	5	1	2	3	6
2020	Finland	WJC	4th	7	0	0	0	6
Junior totals				20	3	4	7	18
