= Vladislav Kolyachonok =

Belarusian ice hockey player (born 2001)

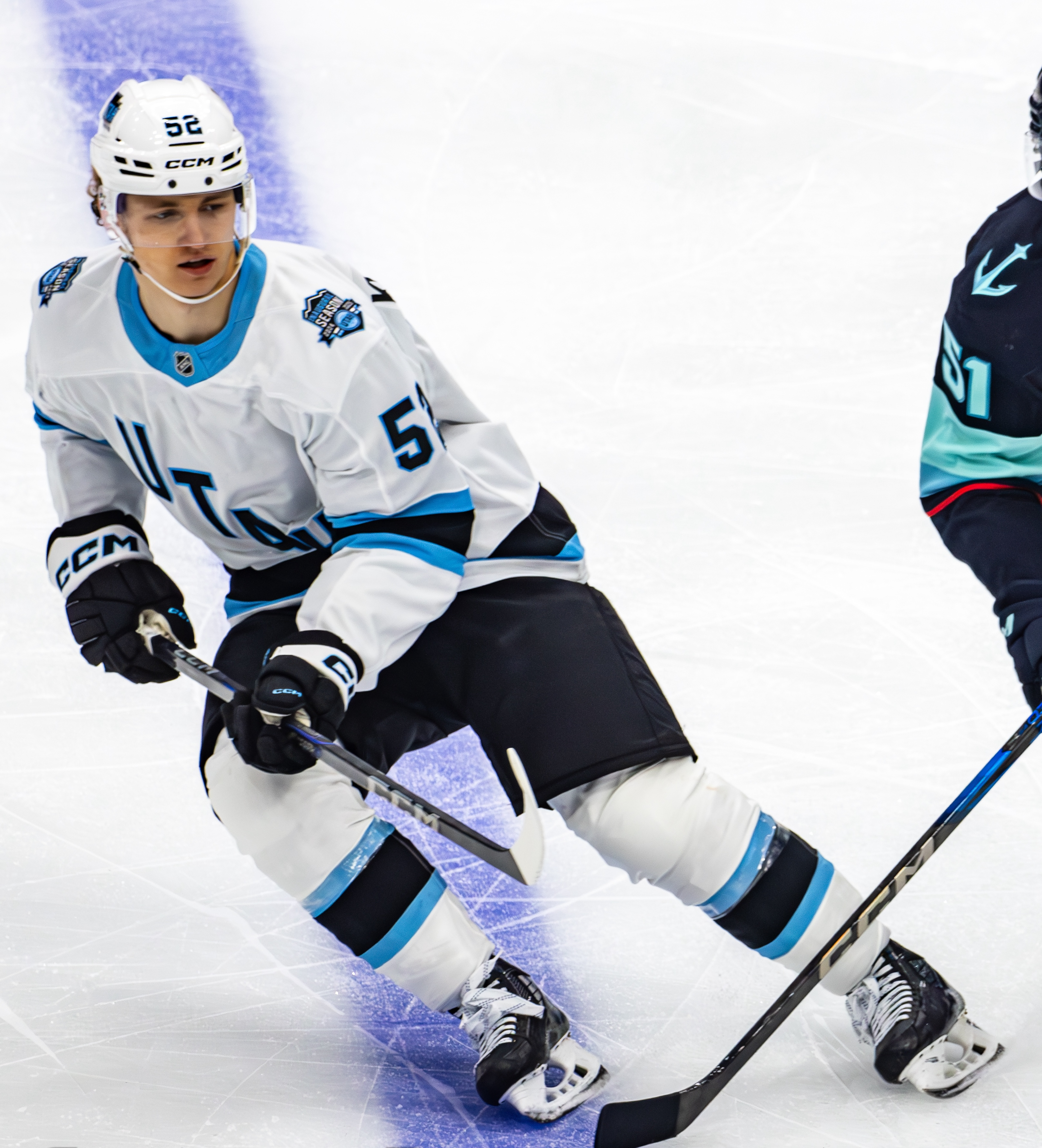
- Kolyachonok with the Utah Hockey Club in 2024
- Born: 26 May 2001 (age 25) Minsk, Belarus
- Height: 6 ft 2 in (188 cm)
- Weight: 198 lb (90 kg; 14 st 2 lb)
- Position: Defence
- Shoots: Left
- NHL team (P) Cur. team Former teams: New Jersey Devils; Utica Comets (AHL); HC Dinamo Minsk; Arizona Coyotes; Utah Hockey Club; Pittsburgh Penguins; Dallas Stars; Boston Bruins
- National team: Belarus
- NHL draft: 52nd overall, 2019; Florida Panthers
- Playing career: 2020–present

Vladislav Anatolevich Kolyachonok (also Uladzislau Anatolevich Kalyachonak, Belarusian: Уладзіслаў Анатолевіч Калячонак; born 26 May 2001) is a Belarusian professional ice hockey player who is a defenceman for the Utica Comets in the American Hockey League (AHL) while under contract to the New Jersey Devils of the National Hockey League (NHL). He was selected by the Florida Panthers, 52nd overall, in the 2019 NHL entry draft. He previously played for Dinamo Minsk of the Kontinental Hockey League, and made his NHL debut in 2022 with the Arizona Coyotes. He also previously played for their successors, the Utah Hockey Club, as well as the Pittsburgh Penguins, Dallas Stars and Boston Bruins.

== Playing career ==
=== Junior ===
Kolyachonok played as a youth in his native Belarus, with Team Belarus at the under-17 and under-18 level in the second tier Vysshaya Liga as an affiliate to top Belarusian club, HC Dinamo Minsk of the Kontinental Hockey League (KHL). His development was noticed in North America, as he was drafted 102nd overall by the London Knights of the Ontario Hockey League (OHL) in the 2018 CHL Import Draft.

In his first major junior season in North America, Kolyachonok appeared in one game with the Knights to start the 2018–19 season, before he was claimed off waivers by the Flint Firebirds on 2 October 2018. Showing potential on the blueline with the Firebirds, Kolyachonok collected 4 goals and 29 points through 53 regular season games and was named to the OHL's All-Rookie Team. Finishing second in scoring from the blueline in his final junior season, Kolyachonok posted 12 goals and 21 assists for 33 points.

=== Professional ===
Kolyachonok was selected by the Florida Panthers of the National Hockey League (NHL) in the second round, 52nd overall of the 2019 NHL entry draft. He was signed to a three-year, entry-level contract with the Panthers on 13 September 2019. With the pandemic delaying the beginning of the 2020–21 season, Kolyachonok opted to remain in Belarus and was loaned by the Panthers to continue his development with HC Dinamo Minsk of the KHL. In making his professional debut, he contributed with one goal and six points through 46 regular season games before he was reassigned by the Panthers to American Hockey League (AHL) affiliate, the Syracuse Crunch, registering two assists through ten games.

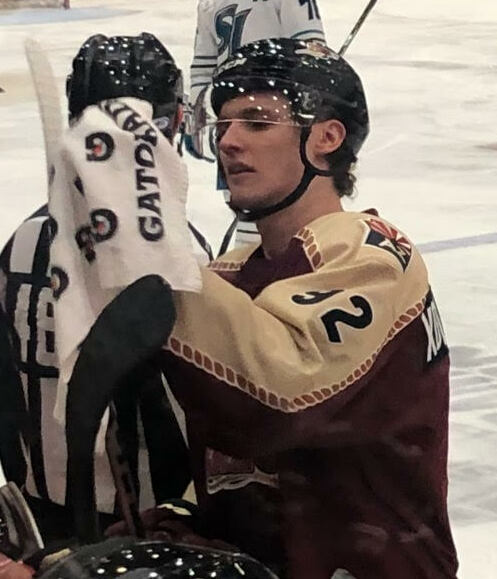
Kolyachonok with the Tucson Roadrunners in 2023.

On 26 July 2021, Kolyachonok was traded by the Panthers, along with Anton Strålman and a 2024 second-round draft pick to the Arizona Coyotes in exchange for a 2023 seventh-round pick. In the following 2021–22 season, Koylachonok was initially reassigned by the Coyotes to their AHL affiliate, the Tucson Roadrunners. Placing third in scoring from the blueline for the Roadrunners through the early stages of the season, Kolyachonok received his first recall to the NHL on 11 January 2022. The following day on 12 January, he made his NHL debut for the rebuilding Coyotes, in an upset 2–1 victory over the Toronto Maple Leafs. He scored his first NHL goal against Jacob Markström in a 4–2 loss to the Calgary Flames. He finished the season with 32 games with Arizona. Kolyachonok began the 2022–23 season with Tucson. He was recalled by Arizona on 1 March 2023, and played two games before being returned to Tucson.

Kolyachonok was assigned to Tucson to start the 2023–24 season. On 16 November, Arizona recalled Kolyachonok from Tucson after defenceman Juuso Välimäki was injured. He made one appearance, on 25 November, in a 2–0 victory over the Vegas Golden Knights. However, during the game he was injured, suffering a lower body injury. After recovering from the injury he was returned to Tucson. He was recalled again in April 2024 to replace Maksymilian Szuber and scored his first goal of the season against the Vancouver Canucks in a 4–3 victory on 10 April. He finished the season having played in five games with Arizona, scoring the one goal and four points and eight goals and 11 points for Tucson.

Shortly after the end of the 2023–24 regular season, the Coyotes' franchise was suspended and team assets were subsequently transferred to the expansion Utah Hockey Club; as a result, Kolyachonok became a member of the Utah team. He signed a two-year contract extension with Utah in June. He made Utah's opening night roster for the 2024–25 season, playing in the team's first ever game.

Kolyachonok featured in 23 games, notching 5 points, with Utah on the blueline until he was placed on waivers by the club at the 4 Nations break in schedule and was subsequently claimed by the Pittsburgh Penguins on 9 February 2025. Following the season, Kolyachonok was traded to the Dallas Stars on 10 July 2025, in exchange for Matt Dumba and a 2028 second-round pick.

Several months later, on 15 December 2025, Kolyachonok was waived by the Stars, and was subsequently claimed by the Boston Bruins the following day. After just two games with Boston, Kolyachonok was waived again on 20 January 2026, and was then re-claimed by Dallas the following day.

As a pending restricted free agent, Kolyachonok was not tendered a qualifying offer by the Stars and was released to free agency. On 1 July 2026, Kolyachonok was signed to a one-year, $850,000 contract with the New Jersey Devils for the 2026–27 season.

== International play ==
Kolyachonok has played internationally at the junior and senior level for the Belarus national team.

== Career statistics ==
=== Regular season and playoffs ===
			Regular season					Playoffs
Season	Team	League	GP	G	A	Pts	PIM	GP	G	A	Pts	PIM
2016–17	Team Belarus U18	BLR-2	6	0	0	0	4	3	0	0	0	0
2017–18	Team Belarus U18	BLR-2	43	5	15	20	24	—	—	—	—	—
2018–19	London Knights	OHL	1	0	1	1	0	—	—	—	—	—
2018–19	Flint Firebirds	OHL	53	4	25	29	44	—	—	—	—	—
2019–20	Flint Firebirds	OHL	53	12	21	33	22	—	—	—	—	—
2020–21	HC Dinamo Minsk	KHL	46	1	5	6	18	—	—	—	—	—
2020–21	Syracuse Crunch	AHL	10	0	2	2	0	—	—	—	—	—
2021–22	Tucson Roadrunners	AHL	33	2	12	14	10	—	—	—	—	—
2021–22	Arizona Coyotes	NHL	32	1	2	3	6	—	—	—	—	—
2022–23	Tucson Roadrunners	AHL	71	3	18	21	52	3	1	0	1	2
2022–23	Arizona Coyotes	NHL	2	0	0	0	0	—	—	—	—	—
2023–24	Tucson Roadrunners	AHL	36	8	3	11	14	2	0	0	0	0
2023–24	Arizona Coyotes	NHL	5	1	3	4	2	—	—	—	—	—
2024–25	Utah Hockey Club	NHL	23	2	3	5	2	—	—	—	—	—
2024–25	Pittsburgh Penguins	NHL	12	0	2	2	8	—	—	—	—	—
2025–26	Texas Stars	AHL	34	1	8	9	14	5	1	0	1	0
2025–26	Dallas Stars	NHL	11	1	2	3	4	—	—	—	—	—
2025–26	Boston Bruins	NHL	2	0	0	0	0	—	—	—	—	—
KHL totals			46	1	5	6	18	—	—	—	—	—
NHL totals			87	5	12	17	22	—	—	—	—	—

=== International ===
Year	Team	Event	GP	G	A	Pts	PIM
2018	Belarus	U18	5	1	1	2	4
2019	Belarus	U18	5	1	4	5	6
2020	Belarus	WJC-D1	2	0	1	1	0
Junior totals			12	2	6	8	10

== Awards and honours ==
Award	Year	Ref
OHL
First All-Rookie Team	2019	
