= Martin Chromiak =

Slovak ice hockey player (born 2002)

- Born: August 20, 2002 (age 24) Ilava, Slovakia
- Height: 6 ft 0 in (183 cm)
- Weight: 190 lb (86 kg; 13 st 8 lb)
- Position: Right wing
- Shoots: Right
- NHL team Former teams: Los Angeles Kings; HK Dukla Trenčín
- National team: Slovakia
- NHL draft: 128th overall, 2020; Los Angeles Kings
- Playing career: 2018–present

Martin Chromiak (born August 20, 2002) is a Slovak professional ice hockey right winger for the Los Angeles Kings of the National Hockey League (NHL). He was selected by the Kings in the fifth round, 128th overall, of the 2020 NHL entry draft. After more than five seasons with the Kings' American Hockey League (AHL) affiliate, the Ontario Reign, he made his NHL debut on October 31, 2026.

== Early life ==
Chromiak was born in Ilava in northern Slovakia, and grew up in the nearby Dubnica nad Váhom. He began playing youth hockey with MHK Dubnica before moving to the HK Dukla Trenčín youth system, with whose under-18 and under-20 teams he won Slovak junior championships in 2018 and 2019, respectively. His brother, Jakub, is also an ice hockey player.

== Playing career ==
=== Slovakia and junior hockey ===
Chromiak played junior hockey in the HK Dukla Trenčín system and was selected second overall by the Kingston Frontenacs of the Ontario Hockey League (OHL) in the 2019 CHL Import Draft. He initially remained in Slovakia, having agreed with Kingston before the draft that he would play senior hockey with Dukla Trenčín in the Tipsport Liga during his draft year. After being cut from Slovakia's squad for the 2020 World Junior Championship, he moved to Kingston midway through the 2019–20 season, where he played on the Frontenacs' top line alongside Shane Wright. He recorded 33 points (11 goals, 22 assists) in 28 games for Kingston and led the team in points per game before the season was ended early by the COVID-19 pandemic, and was named to the OHL Second All-Rookie Team.

The Kings selected Chromiak in the fifth round, 128th overall, of the 2020 NHL entry draft. Because the 2020–21 OHL season was cancelled due to the pandemic, he spent the season with Dukla Trenčín, recording 19 points (7 goals, 12 assists) in 32 games, the most of any junior-aged player in the Extraliga that season. In total he played 66 Extraliga games for Dukla over parts of three seasons, scoring 12 goals and 26 points. On April 20, 2021, he joined the Ontario Reign on an amateur tryout contract.

On September 30, 2021, Chromiak signed a three-year, entry-level contract with the Kings, with an average annual value of $838,333. He returned to Kingston for the 2021–22 season and led the Frontenacs with 44 goals and 86 points in 60 games; his goal total ranked fifth in the OHL.

=== Ontario Reign ===
Chromiak turned professional with the Ontario Reign in 2022–23. Health problems, including a stomach ailment during the preseason, kept him out of the first 11 games of the season, and he made his season debut on November 13, 2022. He finished his rookie season with 15 goals and 28 points in 55 games. In the 2024 Calder Cup playoffs, he was a healthy scratch for seven of Ontario's eight games.

In 2024–25, Chromiak set career highs with 18 goals and 39 points in 69 games. On June 3, 2025, the Kings re-signed him to a one-year, two-way contract with an average annual value of $775,000.

The 2025–26 season was Chromiak's most productive as a professional. He led the Reign in goals (28), assists (28) and points (56) in 71 games, and his seven game-winning goals and 12 power-play goals both ranked among the AHL's leaders. He became the first Slovak player since Marián Studenič in 2023–24 to record 50 points in an AHL season, and helped Ontario win its second divisional title in franchise history. On June 11, 2026, he signed a one-year, two-way contract extension with the Kings with an average annual value of $850,000.

Chromiak was among the Kings' cuts at their 2026–27 training camp and was placed on waivers before being assigned to Ontario. He opened the season with six goals and eight points in nine games, leading the Reign in scoring, and was named AHL Player of the Week for the week ending October 25, 2026, after recording four goals and six points in three games.

=== Los Angeles Kings ===
On October 29, 2026, the Kings recalled Chromiak from Ontario and assigned Jared Wright to the Reign in a corresponding move. At the time of his recall, he had played 276 AHL games, scoring 82 goals and 163 points. He was a healthy scratch for his first game with the team, against the Ottawa Senators.

Chromiak made his NHL debut on October 31, 2026, in a 3–2 home loss to the Buffalo Sabres at Crypto.com Arena. With Adrian Kempe out injured, head coach Peter Laviolette placed Chromiak on the Kings' top line alongside Artemi Panarin and Alex Laferriere. He recorded one shot on goal in 17:31 of ice time, including 4:27 on the power play, and hit the goal frame in the first period. Laviolette said after the game that Chromiak "brought speed to the lineup". Slovak media variously described him as the 100th or the 101st Slovak player to appear in the NHL.

== International play ==
Chromiak has represented Slovakia at five IIHF tournaments: the 2019 World U18 Championship, the 2021 World Junior Championship, and the 2023, 2025 and 2026 World Championships.

At the 2021 World Junior Championship, he scored one goal in five games. He returned for the 2022 tournament, and scored twice against the United States before the event was cancelled because of the COVID-19 pandemic; games from the cancelled tournament do not count in official IIHF records.

Chromiak made his senior World Championship debut on May 12, 2023, against the Czech Republic in Riga, scoring Slovakia's first goal of the tournament on the power play. Slovakia finished ninth. At the 2025 tournament in Stockholm, he scored against France as Slovakia failed to reach the quarterfinals. At the 2026 World Championship in Switzerland, he had his best international tournament, scoring four goals and six points to share the team scoring lead with captain Marek Hrivík; Slovakia finished ninth.

== Career statistics ==
=== Regular season and playoffs ===
			Regular season					Playoffs
Season	Team	League	GP	G	A	Pts	PIM	GP	G	A	Pts	PIM
2018–19	HK Dukla Trenčín	Slovak	2	0	1	1	0	—	—	—	—	—
2019–20	HK Dukla Trenčín	Slovak	32	5	1	6	12	—	—	—	—	—
2019–20	Kingston Frontenacs	OHL	28	11	22	33	2	—	—	—	—	—
2020–21	HK Dukla Trenčín	Slovak	32	7	12	19	0	—	—	—	—	—
2020–21	Ontario Reign	AHL	2	0	0	0	0	—	—	—	—	—
2021–22	Kingston Frontenacs	OHL	60	44	42	86	8	11	7	5	12	4
2022–23	Ontario Reign	AHL	55	15	13	28	12	2	0	1	1	0
2023–24	Ontario Reign	AHL	70	15	17	32	38	1	0	0	0	0
2024–25	Ontario Reign	AHL	69	18	21	39	8	2	1	0	1	0
2025–26	Ontario Reign	AHL	71	28	28	56	14	5	1	0	1	4
Slovak totals			66	12	14	26	12	—	—	—	—	—

=== International ===
Year	Team	Event	Result	GP	G	A	Pts	PIM
2019	Slovakia	U18	10th	7	2	1	3	0
2021	Slovakia	WJC	8th	5	1	0	1	0
2023	Slovakia	WC	9th	5	1	0	1	0
2025	Slovakia	WC	11th	7	1	0	1	0
2026	Slovakia	WC	9th	7	4	2	6	0
Junior totals				12	3	1	4	0
Senior totals				19	6	2	8	0

== Awards and honours ==
Award	Year	Ref
Slovak U18 champion (HK Dukla Trenčín)	2018	
Slovak U20 champion (HK Dukla Trenčín)	2019	
OHL Second All-Rookie Team	2020	
AHL Player of the Week	2026	
