= Simon Holmström =

Swedish ice hockey player (born 2001)

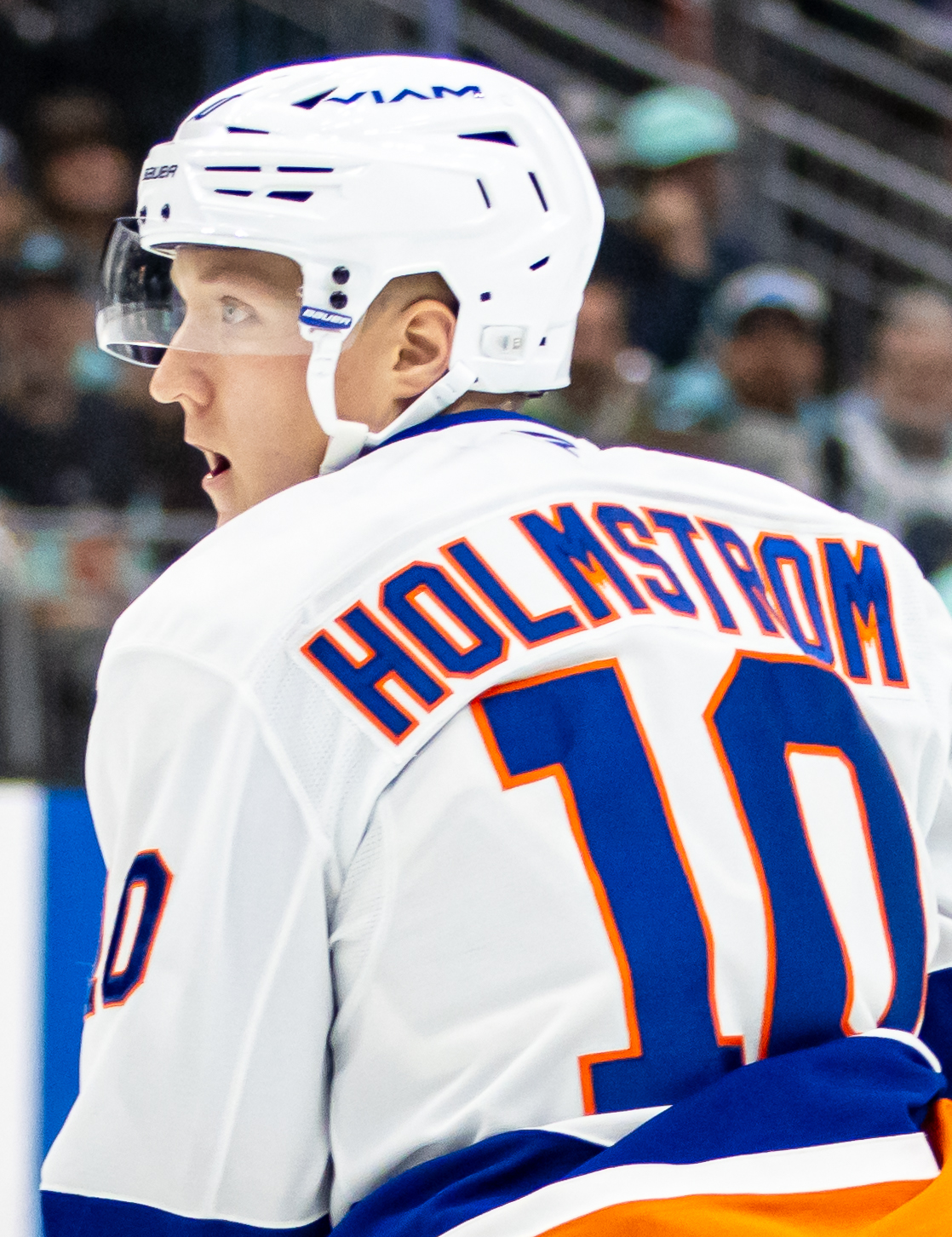
- Holmström with the New York Islanders in 2024
- Born: 24 May 2001 (age 25) Tranås, Sweden
- Height: 6 ft 1 in (185 cm)
- Weight: 208 lb (94 kg; 14 st 12 lb)
- Position: Right wing
- Shoots: Left
- NHL team Former teams: New York Islanders; HV71
- National team: Sweden
- NHL draft: 23rd overall, 2019; New York Islanders
- Playing career: 2017–present

Simon Holmström (born 24 May 2001) is a Swedish professional ice hockey player who is a right winger for the New York Islanders of the National Hockey League (NHL). He was selected 23rd overall by the Islanders in the 2019 NHL entry draft.

== Playing career ==
Holmström first played as a youth in Sweden with hometown club, Tranås AIF, at the under-16 level. While playing beyond his age group throughout his youth, he was signed to continue his development with the junior teams of HV71 in 2015.

He made his professional debut with HV71 during the 2017–18 season, finishing scoreless in a single appearance.

In the following 2018–19 season, Holmström scored 7 goals and 20 points in just 21 games with HV71 of the J20 SuperElit. He also split the year in featuring in games for HV71's J18 team and their SHL team. Holmstrom added 3 points in 3 J20 playoff games.

Entering the NHL Central Scouting rankings as late first round pick, Holmström's projection rang true as he was selected at the 2019 NHL entry draft in the first round, 23rd overall, by the New York Islanders on 21 June 2019. After attending the development camp, he was later signed to a three-year, entry-level contract with the Islanders on 15 July 2019.

On 28 August 2020, Holmström returned to Sweden, joining HC Vita Hästen of the Allsvenskan on loan until the commencement of the delayed 2020–21 North American season. On 23 November, it was announced that Holmström had left Vita Hästen.

Holmström made his NHL debut on 23 November 2022, in the Islanders' 3–0 win against the Edmonton Oilers. Holmström scored his first NHL goal against the Vegas Golden Knights on 17 December in a 5–2 win.

== International play ==
Medal record

Representing Sweden

Ice hockey

World U18 Championships
Gold medal – first place	2019 Sweden	

Holmström made his junior international debut with Sweden at the 2019 IIHF World U18 Championships in his native Sweden. As the host team, Holmström contributed three goals and three assists for six points in seven games. He registered a goal in the gold medal game against Russia to help Sweden capture the championship, their first at the under-18 level.

== Career statistics ==
=== Regular season and playoffs ===
			Regular season					Playoffs
Season	Team	League	GP	G	A	Pts	PIM	GP	G	A	Pts	PIM
2017–18	HV71	J20	28	11	19	30	6	6	1	7	8	2
2017–18	HV71	SHL	1	0	0	0	0	—	—	—	—	—
2018–19	HV71	J20	21	7	13	20	10	3	1	2	3	2
2018–19	HV71	SHL	1	0	0	0	0	—	—	—	—	—
2019–20	Bridgeport Sound Tigers	AHL	46	8	7	15	6	—	—	—	—	—
2020–21	Vita Hästen	Allsv	11	1	1	2	2	—	—	—	—	—
2020–21	Bridgeport Sound Tigers	AHL	24	4	3	7	4	—	—	—	—	—
2021–22	Bridgeport Islanders	AHL	68	12	31	43	8	6	3	1	4	0
2022–23	Bridgeport Islanders	AHL	16	3	2	5	4	—	—	—	—	—
2022–23	New York Islanders	NHL	50	6	3	9	0	—	—	—	—	—
2023–24	New York Islanders	NHL	75	15	10	25	14	3	0	0	0	0
2024–25	New York Islanders	NHL	75	20	25	45	8	—	—	—	—	—
2025–26	New York Islanders	NHL	79	19	22	41	16	—	—	—	—	—
SHL totals			2	0	0	0	0	—	—	—	—	—
NHL totals			279	60	60	120	38	3	0	0	0	0

=== International ===
Year	Team	Event	Result	GP	G	A	Pts	PIM
2019	Sweden	U18	1st place, gold medalist(s)	7	3	3	6	0
2021	Sweden	WJC	5th	5	0	5	5	2
2026	Sweden	WC	7th	8	1	4	5	6
Junior totals				12	3	8	11	2
Senior totals				8	1	4	5	6

Awards and achievements
Preceded by Noah Dobson	New York Islanders first round pick 2019	Succeeded by Cole Eiserman
