= Philip Broberg =

Swedish ice hockey player (born 2001)

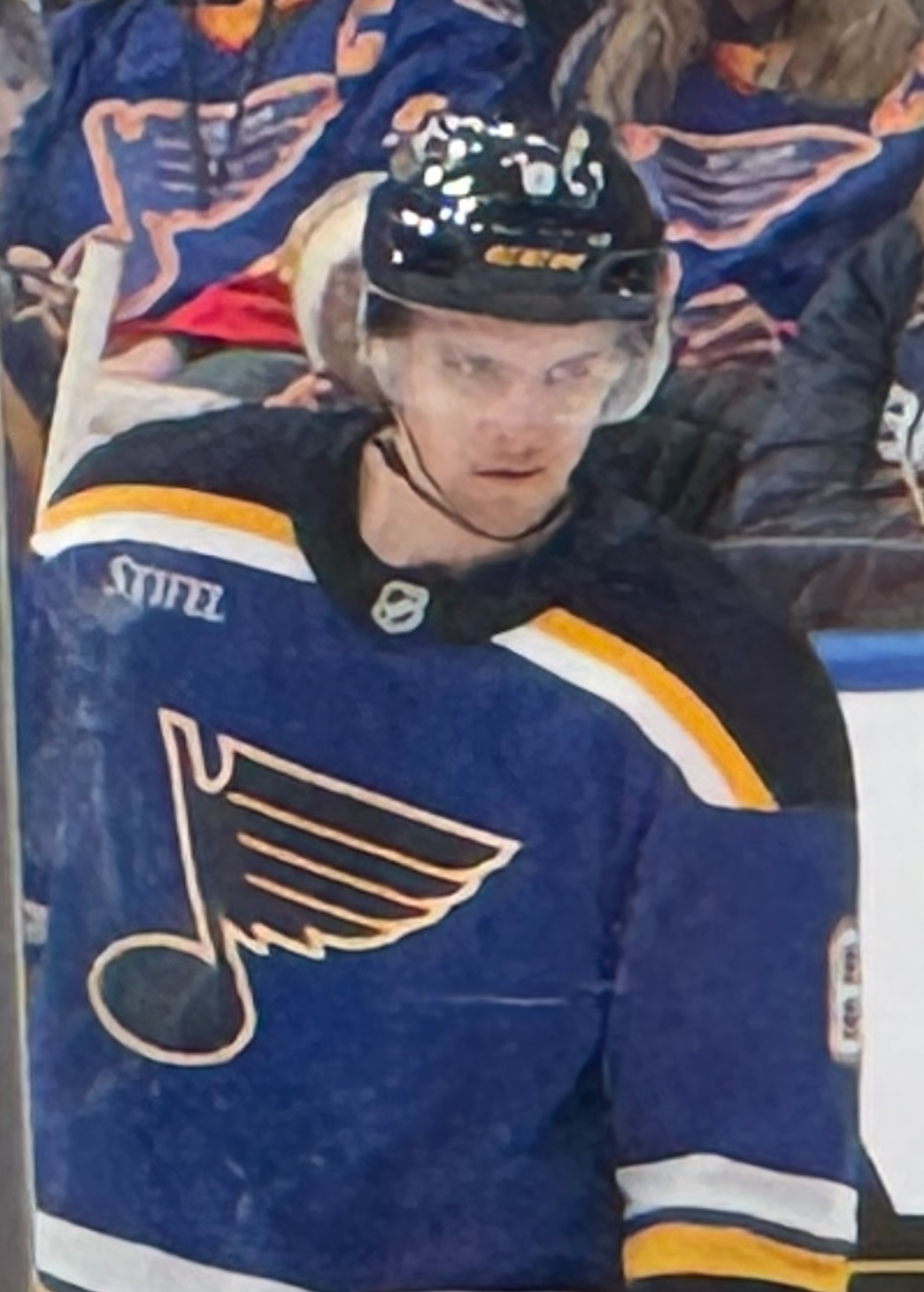
- Broberg in 2024
- Born: 25 June 2001 (age 25) Örebro, Sweden
- Height: 6 ft 4 in (193 cm)
- Weight: 210 lb (95 kg; 15 st 0 lb)
- Position: Defence
- Shoots: Left
- NHL team Former teams: St. Louis Blues; Skellefteå AIK; Edmonton Oilers
- National team: Sweden
- NHL draft: 8th overall, 2019; Edmonton Oilers
- Playing career: 2018–present

Philip Broberg (born 25 June 2001) is a Swedish professional ice hockey player who is a defenceman and alternate captain for the St. Louis Blues of the National Hockey League (NHL). He was drafted eighth overall by the Edmonton Oilers in the 2019 NHL entry draft.

== Playing career ==
=== Sweden ===
Broberg originally played as a youth within the Örebro HK organization before moving to continue in the J20 SuperElit with AIK during the 2017–18 season. As a 17-year-old, he made his professional debut in the HockeyAllsvenskan with AIK in the 2018–19 season. Showing both defensive and offensive instincts, Broberg appeared in 41 games in the regular season posting 2 goals and 9 points.

With AIK remaining in the Allsvenskan after qualification, Broberg secured a move to the top-flight Swedish Hockey League, agreeing to a one-year contract with Skellefteå AIK on 17 May 2019.

=== Edmonton Oilers ===
On 21 June 2019, Broberg was drafted 8th overall by the Edmonton Oilers in the 2019 NHL entry draft. He was signed to a three-year, entry-level contract with the Oilers on 4 July 2019. Approaching the 2019–20 season, Broberg announced he would remain in Sweden to play in the SHL with Skellefteå AIK to continue his development.

Broberg was included on the Oilers roster for Phase 4 of the NHL's return to play after Mike Green opted out, joining the team for the Stanley Cup qualifiers. Following Edmonton's elimination, Broberg was returned to Skellefteå on loan until the start of the 2020–21 NHL season.

With the NHL season delayed due to the ongoing pandemic, Broberg remained with Skellefteå for the duration of the 2020–21 season, he recorded 3 goals and 13 points in 44 regular season games before making his post-season debut with Skellefteå going scoreless in 12 games. On 3 May 2021, he was returned to the Oilers, assigned to the club's taxi squad nearing the completion of the regular season.

Broberg started the 2021–22 season with the Bakersfield Condors, the Oilers' AHL affiliate. He played his first NHL game on 20 November 2021 against the Chicago Blackhawks, scoring an assist in the Oilers' 5–2 home victory. He played 23 games for the Oilers in the regular season, notably scoring his first NHL goal in the second half of the season following improvements under new coach Jay Woodcroft. He also appeared in one Stanley Cup playoff game, as part of the Oilers' deep run to the Western Conference Final.

=== St. Louis Blues ===
On August 13, 2024, Broberg was tendered an offer sheet from the St. Louis Blues for 2 years and $4.58M per year. The Oilers declined to match the offer, so on August 20, he was officially signed by the Blues. A second-round pick was awarded to the Oilers as compensation.

== Career statistics ==
Medal record

Representing Sweden

Ice hockey

World Junior Championships
Bronze medal – third place	2020 Czech Republic	

World U18 Championships
Gold medal – first place	2019 Sweden	

=== Regular season and playoffs ===
			Regular season					Playoffs
Season	Team	League	GP	G	A	Pts	PIM	GP	G	A	Pts	PIM
2017–18	Örebro HK	J20	15	0	2	2	0	—	—	—	—	—
2017–18	AIK	J20	23	6	7	13	6	—	—	—	—	—
2018–19	AIK	J20	8	2	6	8	8	3	0	1	1	0
2018–19	AIK	Allsv	41	2	7	9	14	—	—	—	—	—
2019–20	Skellefteå AIK	SHL	45	1	7	8	6	—	—	—	—	—
2020–21	Skellefteå AIK	SHL	44	3	10	13	10	12	0	0	0	2
2021–22	Bakersfield Condors	AHL	31	4	19	23	18	4	0	1	1	0
2021–22	Edmonton Oilers	NHL	23	1	2	3	8	1	0	0	0	0
2022–23	Bakersfield Condors	AHL	7	2	2	4	0	—	—	—	—	—
2022–23	Edmonton Oilers	NHL	46	1	7	8	2	9	0	0	0	4
2023–24	Edmonton Oilers	NHL	12	0	2	2	0	10	2	1	3	0
2023–24	Bakersfield Condors	AHL	49	5	33	38	16	2	0	1	1	0
2024–25	St. Louis Blues	NHL	68	8	21	29	16	7	1	1	2	2
2025–26	St. Louis Blues	NHL	81	6	28	34	16	—	—	—	—	—
SHL totals			89	4	17	21	16	12	0	0	0	2
NHL totals			230	16	60	76	42	27	3	2	5	6

=== International ===
Year	Team	Event	Result	GP	G	A	Pts	PIM
2017	Sweden	U17	8th	5	0	0	0	4
2018	Sweden	HG18	2nd place, silver medalist(s)	5	3	1	4	4
2019	Sweden	WJC	5th	4	0	1	1	0
2019	Sweden	U18	1st place, gold medalist(s)	7	2	4	6	6
2020	Sweden	WJC	3rd place, bronze medalist(s)	7	1	0	1	4
2021	Sweden	WJC	5th	4	0	3	3	0
2014	Sweden	OG	7th	5	0	1	1	0
Junior totals				32	6	9	15	18
Senior totals				5	0	1	1	0

== Awards and honours ==
Award	Year	Ref
International
World U18 Championship – Best Defenceman	2019	
World U18 Championship – Media All-Star Team	2019	

Awards and achievements
Preceded by Evan Bouchard	Edmonton Oilers first-round draft pick 2019	Succeeded by Dylan Holloway
