= Yaroslav Askarov =

Russian ice hockey player (born 2002)

- Askarov with the San Jose Sharks in 2026
- Born: 16 June 2002 (age 24) Omsk, Russia
- Height: 6 ft 3 in (191 cm)
- Weight: 180 lb (82 kg; 12 st 12 lb)
- Position: Goaltender
- Catches: Right
- NHL team Former teams: San Jose Sharks; SKA Saint Petersburg; Nashville Predators
- NHL draft: 11th overall, 2020; Nashville Predators
- Playing career: 2019–present

Yaroslav Vladimirovich Askarov (Russian: Ярослав Владимирович Аскаров; born 16 June 2002) is a Russian professional ice hockey player who is a goaltender for the San Jose Sharks of the National Hockey League (NHL). He was selected 11th overall by the Nashville Predators in the 2020 NHL entry draft, where he was considered as the top ranked goaltender.

== Playing career ==
Askarov played as a youth with Buldogi St. Petersburg at the under-16 level in 2017 before joining powerhouse club, SKA Saint Petersburg, to continue his development.

During the 2019–20 season, on 27 November 2019, Askarov made his KHL debut at the age of 17. He collected his first win in that game, allowing two goals in a victory over HC Sochi.

Following completion of the 2021–22 season with SKA, Askarov continued his season in North America by agreeing to a try-out contract for the playoffs with the Predators AHL affiliate, the Milwaukee Admirals, on 3 May 2022. While with the Admirals, Askarov was signed by the Predators to a three-year, entry-level contract on 17 May 2022.

During the 2022–23 NHL season, on 11 January 2023, Askarov was recalled by the Predators and made his NHL debut on 12 January, in a 4–3 loss to the Montreal Canadiens.

Askarov was originally anticipated as the eventual successor to Predators starting goaltender Juuse Saros. However, the Predators signed Saros to an eight-year contract extension in the summer of 2024, and also signed free agent Scott Wedgewood to a two-year contract to serve as Saros' backup. Askarov, seeking a greater role in the NHL but playing behind two veteran goaltenders signed long-term, requested a trade from the Predators organization in light of the signings. On 23 August 2024, Askarov was traded to the San Jose Sharks along with a third-round pick and prospect Nolan Burke in exchange for prospects Magnus Chrona and David Edstrom, along with a conditional first-round pick in the 2025 NHL entry draft, which originally belonged to the Vegas Golden Knights. A day later, he signed a two-year contract with the Sharks, starting in the 2025–26 season. Askarov made his first start as a member of the San Jose Sharks on 21 November, in a 3–2 shootout loss to the St. Louis Blues. Four days later, on 25 November, Askarov recorded his first win as a Shark in a 7–2 victory over the Los Angeles Kings. He also recorded his first NHL point in this game, assisting on a Nico Sturm goal.

== Career statistics ==
=== Regular season and playoffs ===
			Regular season									Playoffs
Season	Team	League	GP	W	L	OTL	MIN	GA	SO	GAA	SV%	GP	W	L	MIN	GA	SO	GAA	SV%
2018–19	SKA-Varyagi im. Morozova	MHL	31	15	12	4	1,725	68	4	2.37	.921	4	1	2	166	10	0	3.61	.898
2019–20	SKA-Neva	VHL	18	12	3	3	1,053	43	2	2.45	.920	—	—	—	—	—	—	—	—
2019–20	SKA Saint Petersburg	KHL	1	1	0	0	60	2	0	2.00	.920	—	—	—	—	—	—	—	—
2020–21	SKA-Neva	VHL	6	2	3	1	367	13	0	2.12	.923	—	—	—	—	—	—	—	—
2020–21	SKA Saint Petersburg	KHL	9	5	4	0	495	10	1	1.21	.951	—	—	—	—	—	—	—	—
2020–21	SKA-1946	MHL	2	2	0	0	120	1	1	0.50	.979	7	3	4	431	17	0	2.37	.927
2021–22	SKA-Neva	VHL	9	5	2	2	537	23	1	2.57	.899	3	2	1	179	6	0	2.01	.937
2021–22	SKA Saint Petersburg	KHL	6	2	1	2	298	9	0	1.81	.913	—	—	—	—	—	—	—	—
2022–23	Milwaukee Admirals	AHL	48	26	16	5	2,851	128	3	2.69	.911	12	6	6	756	34	0	2.70	.903
2022–23	Nashville Predators	NHL	1	0	1	0	58	4	0	4.15	.866	—	—	—	—	—	—	—	—
2023–24	Milwaukee Admirals	AHL	44	30	13	1	2,557	102	6	2.39	.911	5	2	3	295	16	0	3.25	.882
2023–24	Nashville Predators	NHL	2	1	0	0	82	2	0	1.47	.943	—	—	—	—	—	—	—	—
2024–25	San Jose Barracuda	AHL	22	11	9	1	1,250	51	4	2.45	.923	6	3	2	358	10	1	1.68	.935
2024–25	San Jose Sharks	NHL	13	4	6	2	716	37	0	3.10	.896	—	—	—	—	—	—	—	—
2025–26	San Jose Sharks	NHL	47	21	20	4	2596	157	0	3.63	.884	—	—	—	—	—	—	—	—
KHL totals			16	8	5	2	853	21	1	1.48	.937	—	—	—	—	—	—	—	—
NHL totals			63	26	27	6	3453	200	0	3.47	.887	—	—	—	—	—	—	—	—

Medal record

Representing Russia

Ice hockey

World Junior Championships
Silver medal – second place	2020 Czech Republic	

IIHF World U18 Championships
Silver medal – second place	2019 Sweden	

=== International ===
Year	Team	Event	Result	GP	W	L	T	MIN	GA	SO	GAA	SV%
2018	Russia	HG18	3rd place, bronze medalist(s)	5	4	1	0	299	11	1	2.21	.921
2018	Russia	U17	1st place, gold medalist(s)	5	5	0	0	300	7	2	1.40	.948
2019	Russia	U18	2nd place, silver medalist(s)	6	2	3	0	364	14	1	2.31	.916
2019	Russia	HG18	1st place, gold medalist(s)	4	4	0	0	240	5	1	1.25	.960
2020	Russia	WJC	2nd place, silver medalist(s)	5	2	1	0	221	10	0	2.71	.877
2021	Russia	WJC	4th	6	3	3	0	360	15	0	2.50	.914
Junior totals				31	20	8	0	1784	62	5	2.36	.922

== Awards and honors ==
Award	Year	Ref
International
World Junior A Challenge – All-Star Team	2018	
World U18 Championship – Best Goaltender	2019	
World U18 Championship – Media All-Star Team	2019	

Awards and achievements
Preceded by Philip Tomasino	Nashville Predators first-round draft pick 2020	Succeeded by Fedor Svechkov
