= Oscar Lawner =

Swedish ice hockey player

- Born: 13 February 2001 (age 25) Karlstad, Sweden
- Height: 5 ft 11 in (180 cm)
- Weight: 187 lb (85 kg; 13 st 5 lb)
- Position: Left wing
- Shoots: Left
- SHL team Former teams: Linköping HC; Färjestad BK
- Playing career: 2018–present

Oscar Lawner (born 13 February 2001) is a professional Swedish ice hockey player. Lawner currently plays for Linköping HC in the Swedish Hockey League (SHL). His youth team was Kils AIK and he made his debut in the SHL with Färjestad BK during the 2018–19 season.

== Awards and honours ==
Award	Year
SHL
Le Mat Trophy (Färjestad BK)	2022
