= Maxim Čajkovič =

Slovak ice hockey player (born 2001)

- Born: 3 January 2001 (age 25) Bratislava, Slovakia
- Height: 6 ft 0 in (183 cm)
- Weight: 201 lb (91 kg; 14 st 5 lb)
- Position: Right wing
- Shoots: Right
- ELH team Former teams: HC Litvínov; Bratislava Capitals; Syracuse Crunch; Iowa Wild; WBS Penguins
- National team: Slovakia
- NHL draft: 89th overall, 2019; Tampa Bay Lightning
- Playing career: 2020–present

Maxim Čajkovič (born 3 January 2001) is a Slovak professional ice hockey winger currently under contract with HC Litvínov of the Tipsport Extraliga.

== Career ==
=== Early career ===
Maxim Čajkovič was born on 3 January 2001 in Bratislava. He represented Slovakia in international junior tournaments and was regarded as one of the promising young forwards of his generation. Despite the high expectations, his international career faced a notable controversy in 2020. During the Slovak national junior team’s pre-tournament camp ahead of the World Junior Championships, Čajkovič was dismissed from the team following two aggressive hits on teammates during an intra-squad scrimmage. One of the hits resulted in a concussion for fellow forward Samuel Krajč, while another involved a hard challenge on Jakub Kolenič.

=== North American Career ===
Following his draft selection by the Tampa Bay Lightning in as the only Slovak player drafted in the 2019 NHL entry draft, Čajkovič moved to North America to pursue an NHL career. However, he did not make an appearance in the National Hockey League, instead playing in its affiliated minor leagues. He spent time in the American Hockey League (AHL) and the ECHL, primarily with the Iowa Wild and other affiliates. In 2020 he played one session for Bratislava Capitals on loan.

=== Return to Europe ===
In 2024, after six years in North America, Čajkovič returned to Europe, signing with HC Verva Litvínov in the Czech Extraliga. He cited the move as a new chapter in his career, expressing a strong desire to continue improving and potentially earn another opportunity in the NHL. During the 2024–25 season, Čajkovič recorded 11 points (7 goals and 4 assists) across 36 games for Litvínov. The club saw potential in his development and exercised its contract option to retain him for the following season.

=== Senior National Team Play ===
In May 2025, Čajkovič made his senior national team debut at the 2025 IIHF World Championship in Stockholm. Although he was initially a healthy scratch and did not play in the team’s first two games, he was officially added to the active roster ahead of Slovakia’s third match against Austria.

Čajkovič marked his debut with an assist on Matúš Sukeľ’s equalizing goal, helping tie the game at 2–2 before Slovakia ultimately lost in a shootout, 2–3.

== Player statistics ==
			Regular season					Playoffs
Season	Team	League	GP	G	A	Pts	PIM	GP	G	A	Pts	PIM
2020–21	Bratislava Capitals (Loan)	ICEHL	27	2	15	17	16	—	—	—	—	—
2021–22	Syracuse Crunch	AHL	20	3	3	6	4	—	—	—	—	—
2021–22	Orlando Solar Bears	ECHL	25	8	4	12	16	—	—	—	—	—
2022–23	Syracuse Crunch	AHL	2	0	0	0	0	1	0	0	0	0
2022–23	Orlando Solar Bears	ECHL	41	10	17	27	53	—	—	—	—	—
2023–24	Iowa Wild	AHL	5	1	2	3	2	—	—	—	—	—
2023–24	Iowa Heartlanders	ECHL	20	12	6	18	32	—	—	—	—	—
2023–24	Wilkes-Barre/Scranton Penguins	AHL	5	1	1	2	2	—	—	—	—	—
2023–24	Wheeling Nailers	ECHL	13	0	4	4	12	—	—	—	—	—
2024–25	HC Litvínov	ELH	34	6	4	10	20	2	1	0	1	25
ICEHL totals			27	2	15	17	16	—	—	—	—	—
AHL totals			32	5	6	11	8	1	0	0	0	0
ECHL totals			99	30	31	61	113	—	—	—	—	—
ELH totals			34	6	4	10	20	2	1	0	1	25
