= John Farinacci =

American ice hockey player (born 2001)

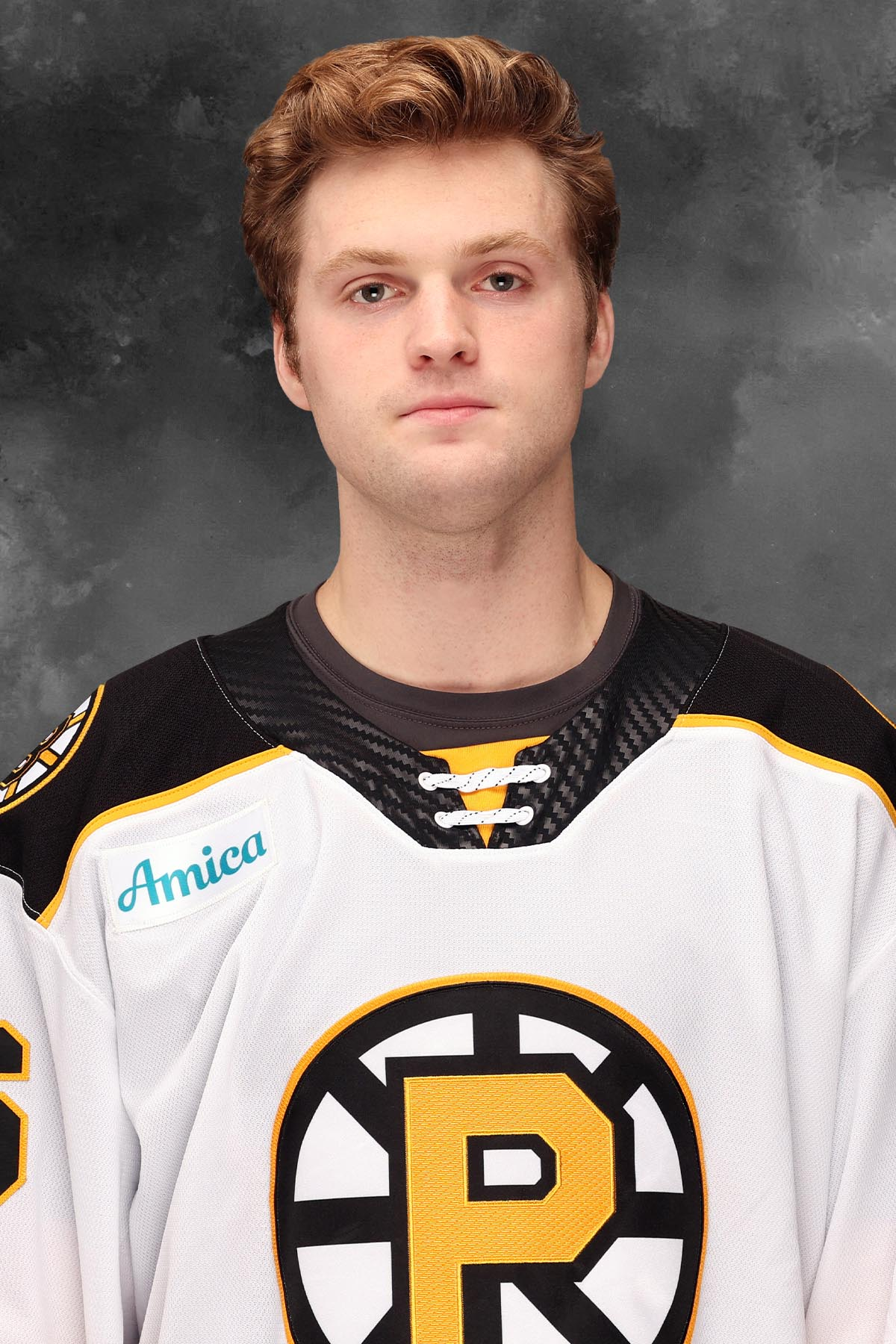
- Farinacci with the Providence Bruins
- Born: February 14, 2001 (age 25) Red Bank, New Jersey, U.S.
- Height: 5 ft 11 in (180 cm)
- Weight: 184 lb (83 kg; 13 st 2 lb)
- Position: Center
- Shoots: Right
- AHL team Former teams: Milwaukee Admirals; Boston Bruins
- NHL draft: 76th overall, 2019; Arizona Coyotes
- Playing career: 2023–present

John Farinacci (born February 14, 2001) is an American ice hockey forward for the Milwaukee Admirals of the American Hockey League (AHL). He was drafted 76th overall by the Arizona Coyotes in the third round of the 2019 NHL entry draft. He played college ice hockey for the Harvard Crimson men's ice hockey team.

== Playing career ==
Raised in Red Bank, New Jersey, Farinacci played prep hockey for the Delbarton School before transferring to Shattuck-Saint Mary's. Following his sophomore year, he transferred to the Dexter Southfield School for his final two years of high school. During his senior year at Dexter Southfield, he was named team captain of the hockey team.

=== Collegiate ===
Farinacci was drafted 76th overall by the Arizona Coyotes in the 2019 NHL entry draft. He committed to play college ice hockey at Harvard University starting in the 2019–20 season.

Farinacci had a successful freshman year with the Crimson, scoring 10 goals and 12 assists for 22 points in 31 games. Unfortunately, Farinacci and the rest of the team's season was abruptly cancelled during the 2020 ECAC Hockey Tournament due to the COVID-19 pandemic.

After initially expecting to play, the Ivy League announced on November 12, 2020, that they would be cancelling winter sports for the season. This meant that Farinacci would not play for Harvard in the 2020–21 season. However, this did not stop him from playing successful hockey. For the season, he returned to play for the Muskegon Lumberjacks of the United States Hockey League (USHL), where he played for a little while before committing to Harvard. In seven games with the Lumberjacks, serving as an assistant captain, he scored four goals and four assists. Farinacci also played on the international stage during the season, representing the United States at the 2021 World Junior Ice Hockey Championships, where he scored five goals and two assists in seven games en route to the gold medal. After the tournament, he would not return to play for the Lumberjacks, instead opting to train and focus on preparing for his next season at Harvard.

Farinacci returned to Harvard for the 2021–22 season for his junior year. Unfortunately for Farinacci, his production dipped in comparison to his freshman year, scoring 10 goals and nine assists for 19 points in 29 games. However, he helped Harvard win the 2022 ECAC Hockey tournament, giving Harvard an automatic bid in the 2022 NCAA tournament. Harvard would be eliminated in the first round to the Minnesota State Mavericks.

Farinacci was named captain of the Crimson for the 2022–23 season. However, he would end up missing the first part of the season recovering from surgery due to a herniated disc. After returning to action on January 13, 2023, Farinacci put up great numbers and had his best statistical season at Harvard yet, given his missed time. He scored five goals and 15 assists in 19 games. Farinacci would help Harvard reach the final of the 2023 ECAC Hockey tournament, where they would lose to the Colgate Raiders. Despite this, Harvard still received a bid to the 2023 NCAA tournament, where they would lose 8–1 in the first round to the Ohio State Buckeyes, in what would be Farinacci's final game of his college career. Farinacci scored the lone Crimson goal in the loss.

The Ivy League did not offer their athletes another year of eligibility due to the lost 2020–21 season. As such, Farinacci could not return to Harvard for a fourth season. Although he could've transferred for another year, Farinacci did not want to play college hockey anywhere but Harvard, and as such, was set to turn pro.

=== Professional ===
On April 12, 2023, it was announced that Farinacci would not sign with the Coyotes, and intended to test the free agent market. He became a highly coveted collegiate free agent, and ultimately signed a two-year entry-level contract with the Bruins on August 16, 2023.

Farinacci was assigned the Bruins American Hockey League (AHL) affiliate, the Providence Bruins, to start the 2023-24 season. Farinacci would stay in the AHL for the entirety of the season, finding success with the P-Bruins, scoring 12 goals and 26 assists for 38 points in 71 games. Farinacci would also score a goal and an assist in four playoff games, but the Bruins were eliminated by the Hartford Wolf Pack in four games in the opening round of the 2024 Calder Cup playoffs.

Farinacci enjoyed another successful season in the AHL in 2024-25, once again being a consistent, but not high-level scorer. He would get rewarded for his efforts by being called up to the NHL squad for the first time in his career on April 14, 2025. He would play in the Bruins final game of the regular season against his hometown New Jersey Devils, and would score his first NHL goal against them in the process. After the game, Farinacci would return to Providence to help the junior Bruins with their playoff run. He would score a lone goal in eight games as the Bruins were eliminated by the Charlotte Checkers in the divisional round of the Calder Cup playoffs.

On July 15, 2025, Farinacci signed a one-year, two-way deal to stay with the Bruins.

Farinacci again started the with Providence, and he would spend the entire season with them, scoring nine goals and 10 assists in 68 games. Farinacci would help the Bruins win the Macgregor Kilpatrick Trophy, awarded to the AHL's top point-getting team. Facing the Springfield Thunderbirds in the first round of the Calder Cup playoffs, Farinacci and the Bruins would get upset in four games, ending their season early. Farinacci scored a lone assist in four playoff games.

Following three seasons within the Bruins organization, Farinacci signed to a one-year AHL contract with the Milwaukee Admirals, affiliate to the Nashville Predators, on August 11, 2026.

== Personal ==
Farinacci is cousins with Chicago Blackhawks forward Ryan Donato, and his uncle, Ted Donato was his head coach at Harvard. His sister is married to Florida Panthers forward Brady Tkachuk making them brothers in law.

== Career statistics ==
			Regular season					Playoffs
Season	Team	League	GP	G	A	Pts	PIM	GP	G	A	Pts	PIM
2017–18	Muskegon Lumberjacks	USHL	2	0	0	0	0	—	—	—	—	—
2018–19	Muskegon Lumberjacks	USHL	2	2	1	3	0	—	—	—	—	—
2019–20	Harvard University	ECAC	31	10	12	22	21	—	—	—	—	—
2020–21	Muskegon Lumberjacks	USHL	7	4	4	8	2	—	—	—	—	—
2021–22	Harvard University	ECAC	29	10	9	19	12	—	—	—	—	—
2022–23	Harvard University	ECAC	19	5	15	20	2	—	—	—	—	—
2023–24	Providence Bruins	AHL	71	12	26	38	16	4	1	1	2	0
2024–25	Providence Bruins	AHL	58	10	28	38	6	8	1	0	1	0
2024–25	Boston Bruins	NHL	1	1	0	1	0	—	—	—	—	—
2025–26	Providence Bruins	AHL	68	9	10	19	8	4	0	1	1	0
NHL totals			1	1	0	1	0	—	—	—	—	—

=== International ===
Year	Team	Event	Result	GP	G	A	Pts	PIM
2021	United States	WJC	1st place, gold medalist(s)	7	5	2	7	2
Junior totals				7	5	2	7	2

== Awards and honors ==
Award	Year	Ref
College
All-ECAC Rookie Team	2020	
