= Zakhar Bardakov =

Russian ice hockey player (born 2001)

- Born: 24 February 2001 (age 25) Seversk, Russia
- Height: 6 ft 2 in (188 cm)
- Weight: 198 lb (90 kg; 14 st 2 lb)
- Position: Forward
- Shoots: Right
- KHL team Former teams: SKA Saint Petersburg; HC Vityaz; Colorado Avalanche
- NHL draft: 203rd overall, 2021; New Jersey Devils
- Playing career: 2020–present

Zakhar Romanovich Bardakov (Russian: Захар Романович Бардаков; born 24 February 2001) is a Russian professional ice hockey player who is a forward for SKA Saint Petersburg of the Kontinental Hockey League (KHL). He was selected in the seventh round, 203rd overall, by the New Jersey Devils in the 2021 NHL entry draft.

== Playing career ==
Bardakov played two seasons in the Junior Hockey League (MHL) from 2018 to 2020, leading the league in penalty minutes (PIM) both seasons. Eligible for the 2019 NHL entry draft, he was not selected that year nor the next.

Bardakov spent a majority of the 2020–21 season in the Kontinental Hockey League (KHL) with HC Vityaz, debuting as the fourth line center on opening night, against Ak Bars Kazan. After recording eight goals and three assists for 11 points in 44 games, while reducing his penalty minutes to under one minute per night, Bardakov was drafted in the seventh round, 203rd overall, in the 2021 NHL entry draft by the New Jersey Devils.

In June 2021, Bardakov was traded by Vityaz to SKA Saint Petersburg. In the 2021–22 season, Bardakov played just 19 games for his new club, recording one goal and two assists for three points.

Bardakov's penchant for taking penalties returned in the 2022–23 season, as his 45 PIM in 42 games were the most in his KHL career. He spent more time per game killing penalties than serving them, however, as he logged 2:40 of shorthanded time on ice per game. He also reached KHL career-best scoring marks, with six goals and 18 points.

On 1 March 2024, Bardakov's NHL rights were traded by the New Jersey Devils along with a 2024 seventh-round pick to the Colorado Avalanche in exchange for Kurtis MacDermid.

In the 2024–25 season, his final year under contract with SKA, Bardakov assumed a leadership role as an alternate captain and recorded career best offensive marks with 17 goals and 18 assists for 35 points in the regular season, ranking tied for fourth on the team in goals and eighth in points. He added two points in six KHL Playoff contests before SKA was eliminated in the opening round against Dynamo Moscow.

On 20 April 2025, Bardakov left SKA as a free agent, following four years with the club, to sign a one-year, entry-level contract with the Colorado Avalanche for the 2025–26 season.

As a restricted free agent with the Avalanche in the off-season and with his NHL rights still retained by the club, Bardakov opted to return to his native Russia in signing a one-year contract with former club, SKA Saint Petersburg of the KHL, on 3 July 2026.

== Personal life ==
Bardakov and his wife, Daria, have a daughter.

== Career statistics ==
=== Regular season and playoffs ===
			Regular season					Playoffs
Season	Team	League	GP	G	A	Pts	PIM	GP	G	A	Pts	PIM
2018–19	Russkie Vityazi Chekhov	MHL	49	16	19	35	122	—	—	—	—	—
2019–20	Russkie Vityazi Chekhov	MHL	51	15	17	32	149	—	—	—	—	—
2020–21	HC Vityaz	KHL	44	8	3	11	32	—	—	—	—	—
2020–21	Russkie Vityazi Chekhov	MHL	4	1	2	3	0	—	—	—	—	—
2021–22	SKA Saint Petersburg	KHL	19	1	2	3	16	16	0	2	2	12
2021–22	SKA-Neva	VHL	2	1	1	2	2	—	—	—	—	—
2022–23	SKA Saint Petersburg	KHL	42	6	12	18	45	9	1	2	3	6
2023–24	SKA Saint Petersburg	KHL	51	6	6	12	78	10	1	3	4	24
2024–25	SKA Saint Petersburg	KHL	53	17	18	35	30	6	1	1	2	5
2025–26	Colorado Avalanche	NHL	60	1	9	10	14	—	—	—	—	—
2025–26	Colorado Eagles	AHL	1	1	0	1	0	—	—	—	—	—
KHL totals			209	38	41	79	201	41	3	8	11	47
NHL totals			60	1	9	10	14	—	—	—	—	—

=== International ===
Year	Team	Event	Result	GP	G	A	Pts	PIM
2021	Russia	WJC	4th	7	1	1	2	4
Junior totals				7	1	1	2	4
