= Juuso Pärssinen =

Finnish ice hockey player (born 2001)

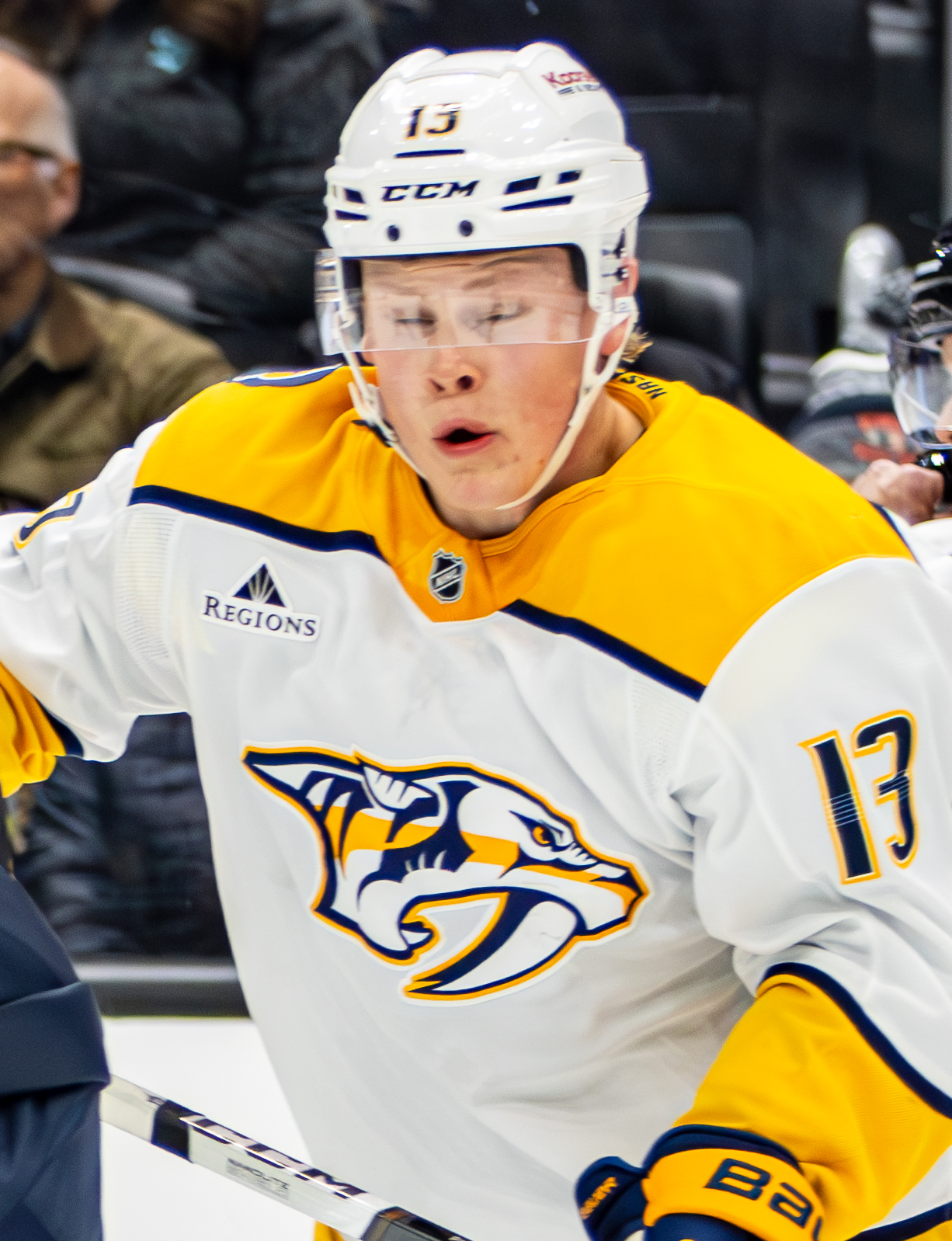
- Pärssinen with the Nashville Predators in 2024
- Born: 1 February 2001 (age 25) Hämeenlinna, Finland
- Height: 6 ft 3 in (191 cm)
- Weight: 212 lb (96 kg; 15 st 2 lb)
- Position: Forward
- Shoots: Left
- NHL team (P) Cur. team Former teams: New York Rangers; Hartford Wolf Pack (AHL); HC TPS; Nashville Predators; Colorado Avalanche
- National team: Finland
- NHL draft: 210th overall, 2019; Nashville Predators
- Playing career: 2018–present

Juuso Pärssinen (born 1 February 2001) is a Finnish professional ice hockey player who is a forward for the Hartford Wolf Pack of the American Hockey League (AHL), while under contract to the New York Rangers of the National Hockey League (NHL). Pärssinen was selected by the Nashville Predators in the seventh round, 210th overall, in the 2019 NHL entry draft, and has also played for the Colorado Avalanche.

== Playing career ==
Pärssinen first played in his native Finland within the junior program of HC TPS. He made his professional debut with HC TPS in Liiga as a 17-year-old during the 2018–19 season. Showing potential, he was a last round selection, 210th overall, by the Nashville Predators in the 2019 NHL entry draft.

Pärssinen played his first full season in the Liiga during the 2020–21 season. Having exclusively played with HC TPS in Finland, Pärssinen was selected as an alternate captain despite his young age and contributed with a team-leading 34 assists and posting 42 points through 55 regular season games. He topped the league in scoring among under-21 players and in the postseason he helped HC TPS by contributing with eight points in 13 games, before HC TPS lost 3–1 in finals to Lukko.

On 1 June 2021, Pärssinen was signed to a three-year, entry-level contract with draft club, the Nashville Predators. Loaned by the Predators back to HC TPS for the ensuing 2021–22 season, he continued his development despite suffering an injury by amassing 32 points through 41 regular season games. He helped HC TPS return to Liiga finals, posting a career-best 12 points in 18 games before losing 4–1 to Tappara.

At the conclusion of his season with HC TPS, Pärssinen embarked on his North American career in joining the Predators' AHL affiliate, the Milwaukee Admirals, for their Calder Cup playoffs campaign on 5 May 2022, finishing with one goal and three points through nine games.

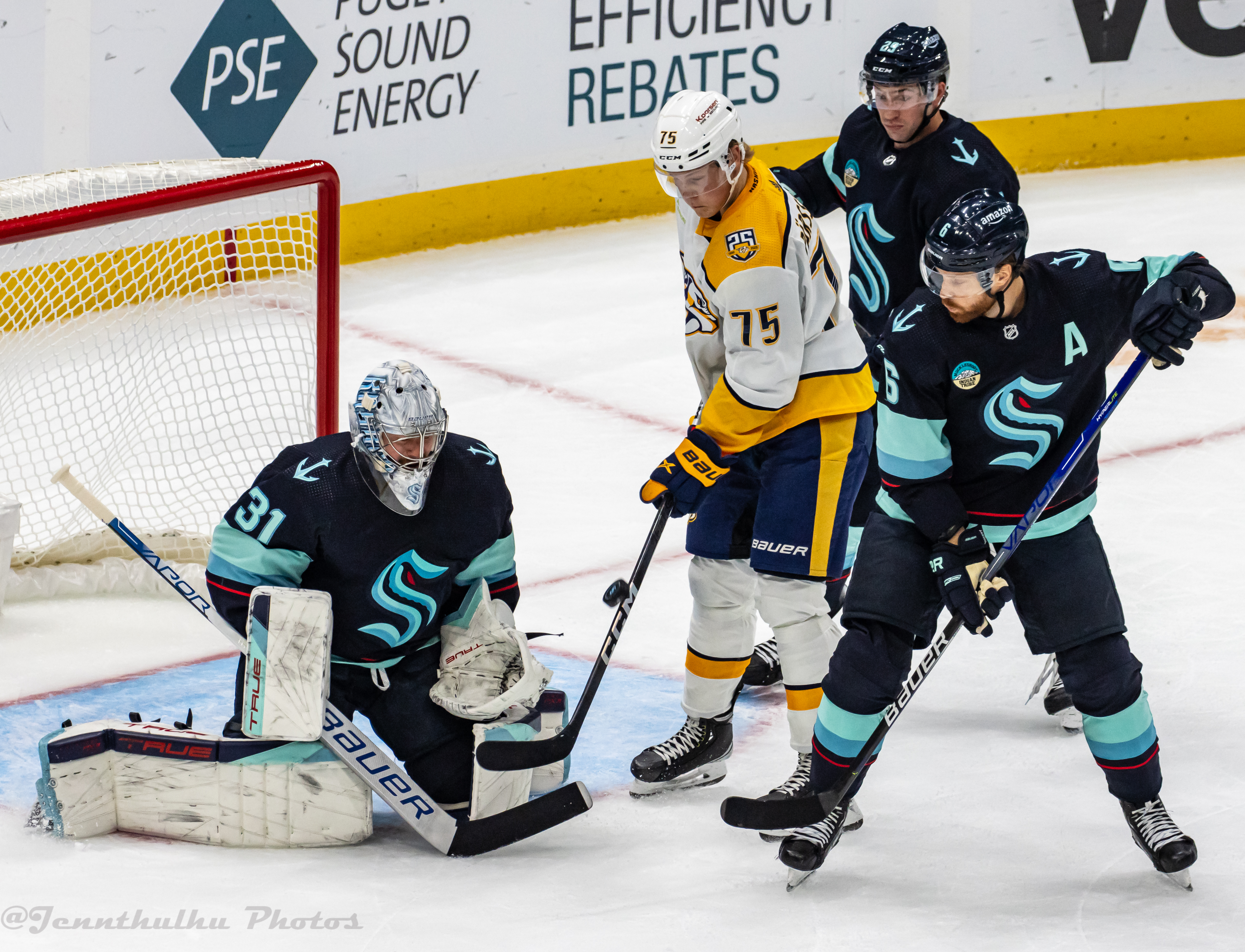
Pärssinen playing against the Seattle Kraken in 2023.

After attending the Predators' 2022–23 training camp, Pärssinen was assigned to begin the 2022–23 season with the Admirals. In scoring at almost a point-per-game pace with nine in 10, helping the Admirals to first in their division, Pärssinen received his first recall to the Predators on 12 November 2022. He made his NHL debut the same day, instantly recording his first NHL goal to help the Predators to a 2–1 victory over the New York Rangers. Inserted into the Predators scoring lines, Pärssinen responded with his first multi-goal and three-point game in just his third appearance, helping Nashville to a 5–4 victory over the New York Islanders on 17 November.

Pärssinen was limited to just 15 appearances, registering five points, over the first half of the 2024–25 season. On 28 December 2024, he was traded by the Predators along with a 2026 seventh-round pick to the Colorado Avalanche in exchange for Ondřej Pavel and a 2027 third-round pick. After only two months with Colorado, however, Pärssinen was traded again, as on 1 March 2025, the Avalanche sent him, Calvin de Haan, and two 2025 draft picks to the New York Rangers in exchange for Hank Kempf, Ryan Lindgren, and Jimmy Vesey.

Pärssinen started the 2025-26 season with the Rangers, but was sent to their AHL affiliate Hartford Wolf Pack after playing in only 14 of the Rangers' first 24 games. He was injured in his first game with Hartford, and after recovering played some games for both the Wolf Pack and the Rangers.

== Personal life ==
Pärssinen is the son of Timo Pärssinen who played professionally from 1994 to 2015. He enjoyed a lengthy European career and briefly played in the NHL with the Mighty Ducks of Anaheim during the 2000–01 season.

He is the eldest of four brothers, Jiri, Julius and Jesse, who all play hockey. His brother, Jiri, is currently under contract with HPK of the Liiga.

== Career statistics ==
=== Regular season and playoffs ===
			Regular season					Playoffs
Season	Team	League	GP	G	A	Pts	PIM	GP	G	A	Pts	PIM
2017–18	HC TPS	Jr. A	16	4	4	8	4	—	—	—	—	—
2018–19	HC TPS	Jr. A	36	13	9	22	28	—	—	—	—	—
2018–19	HC TPS	Liiga	7	1	0	1	0	—	—	—	—	—
2019–20	HC TPS	Liiga	20	7	14	21	16	2	0	0	0	2
2019–20	HC TPS	Liiga	31	5	7	12	4	—	—	—	—	—
2020–21	HC TPS	Liiga	55	8	34	42	36	13	1	7	8	4
2021–22	HC TPS	Liiga	41	9	23	32	8	18	4	8	12	20
2021–22	Milwaukee Admirals	AHL	—	—	—	—	—	9	1	2	3	2
2022–23	Milwaukee Admirals	AHL	10	2	7	9	8	—	—	—	—	—
2022–23	Nashville Predators	NHL	45	6	19	25	15	—	—	—	—	—
2023–24	Nashville Predators	NHL	44	8	4	12	12	1	0	0	0	0
2023–24	Milwaukee Admirals	AHL	36	7	18	25	18	14	1	8	9	0
2024–25	Nashville Predators	NHL	15	2	3	5	0	—	—	—	—	—
2024–25	Colorado Avalanche	NHL	22	2	4	6	8	—	—	—	—	—
2024–25	New York Rangers	NHL	11	2	3	5	11	—	—	—	—	—
2025–26	New York Rangers	NHL	20	2	1	3	10	—	—	—	—	—
2025–26	Hartford Wolf Pack	AHL	15	5	2	7	4	—	—	—	—	—
Liiga totals			134	23	64	87	48	31	5	15	20	24
NHL totals			157	22	34	56	56	1	0	0	0	0

Medal record

Representing Finland

Ice hockey

World Junior Championships
Bronze medal – third place	2021 Canada	

=== International ===
Year	Team	Event	Result	GP	G	A	Pts	PIM
2017	Finland	U17	6th	5	0	2	2	2
2018	Finland	HG18	7th	4	0	0	0	0
2019	Finland	U18	7th	5	1	1	2	2
2021	Finland	WJC	3rd place, bronze medalist(s)	7	2	2	4	0
2025	Finland	WC	7th	8	3	2	5	12
Junior totals				21	3	5	8	4
Senior totals				8	3	2	5	12
