= Gustav Berglund =

Swedish ice hockey player (born 2001)

- Born: 8 January 2001 (age 25) Huskvarna, Sweden
- Height: 6 ft 2 in (188 cm)
- Weight: 194 lb (88 kg; 13 st 12 lb)
- Position: Defence
- Shoots: Right
- AllEttan team Former teams: Brödernas/Väsby; Frölunda HC; Mora IK; Karlskrona HK
- NHL draft: 177th overall, 2019; Detroit Red Wings
- Playing career: 2019–present

Gustav Berglund (born 8 January 2001) is a Swedish ice hockey defenceman for Karlskrona HK of the HockeyAllsvenskan (Allsv). Berglund was drafted 177th overall by the Detroit Red Wings in the 2019 NHL entry draft.

== Playing career ==
Berglund made his professional debut for Frölunda HC of the Swedish Hockey League (SHL) during the 2019–20 season, where he appeared in eight games.

On 6 May 2021, Berglund left the Frölunda HC organization, signing a one-year contract to continue in the HockeyAllsvenskan with Mora IK.

On 13 February 2022, Berglund was loaned to the Karlskrona HK of the HockeyAllsvenskan for the 2021–22 season. On 4 August 2022, he signed a contract extension with Karlskrona HK for the 2022–23 season.

== International play ==
Berglund represented Sweden at the 2021 World Junior Ice Hockey Championships.

== Career statistics ==
=== Regular season and playoffs ===
| | | | Regular season | | | | | Playoffs |
| Season | Team | League | GP | G | A | Pts | PIM | GP | G | A | Pts | PIM |
|---|---|---|---|---|---|---|---|---|---|---|---|---|
| 2017–18 | Frölunda HC | J18 | 16 | 1 | 9 | 10 | 2 | — | — | — | — | — |
| 2018–19 | Frölunda HC | J18 | 15 | 6 | 12 | 18 | 14 | — | — | — | — | — |
| 2018–19 | Frölunda HC | J20 | 9 | 0 | 0 | 0 | 0 | — | — | — | — | — |
| 2019–20 | Frölunda HC | J20 | 30 | 6 | 8 | 14 | 18 | — | — | — | — | — |
| 2019–20 | Frölunda HC | SHL | 8 | 0 | 0 | 0 | 2 | — | — | — | — | — |
| 2020–21 | Västerås IK | Allsv | 31 | 0 | 5 | 5 | 8 | — | — | — | — | — |
| 2021–22 | Mora IK | Allsv | 10 | 2 | 1 | 3 | 2 | — | — | — | — | — |
| 2021–22 | Karlskrona HK | Allsv | 4 | 0 | 1 | 1 | 0 | — | — | — | — | — |
| 2022–23 | Karlskrona HK | AllEttan | 30 | 3 | 8 | 11 | 8 | — | — | — | — | — |
| 2023–24 | Karlskrona HK | AllEttan | 35 | 2 | 7 | 9 | 2 | — | — | — | — | — |
| SHL totals | | | 8 | 0 | 0 | 0 | 2 | — | — | — | — | — |

=== International ===
| Year | Team | Event | Result | GP | G | A | Pts | PIM |
|---|---|---|---|---|---|---|---|---|
| 2021 | Sweden | WJC | 5th | 1 | 0 | 1 | 1 | 0 |
| Junior totals | | | | 1 | 0 | 1 | 1 | 0 |
