= Kirill Kirsanov =

Russian ice hockey player (born 2002)

- Born: 19 September 2002 (age 23) Tver, Russia
- Height: 6 ft 1 in (185 cm)
- Weight: 198 lb (90 kg; 14 st 2 lb)
- Position: Defence
- Shoots: Left
- NHL team (P) Cur. team Former teams: Los Angeles Kings; Ontario Reign (AHL); SKA Saint Petersburg; HC Vityaz; Torpedo Nizhny Novgorod
- NHL draft: 84th overall, 2021; Los Angeles Kings
- Playing career: 2020–present

Kirill Vladimirovich Kirsanov (Russian: Кирилл Владимирович Кирсанов; born 19 September 2002) is a Russian professional ice hockey defenceman for the Ontario Reign in the American Hockey League (AHL) while under contract as a prospect to the Los Angeles Kings in the National Hockey League (NHL). He was selected by the Kings in the third-round, 84th overall, of the 2021 NHL entry draft.

== Playing career ==
Following four seasons within SKA Saint Petersburg, Kirsanov was released from the organization and returned to fellow KHL outfit and original junior development team, HC Vityaz, for the 2023–24 season on 1 May 2023. Kirsanov made just two appearances with Vityaz, going scoreless, before he was traded along with financial compensation to Torpedo Nizhny Novgorod in exchange for Alexander Daryin and Ivan Vorobyov on 13 October 2023.

After two seasons with Torpedo and having concluded his contract, Kirsanov was signed to a two-year, entry-level contract with draft club, the Los Angeles Kings of the NHL on 2 June 2025.

== Career statistics ==
=== Regular season and playoffs ===
			Regular season					Playoffs
Season	Team	League	GP	G	A	Pts	PIM	GP	G	A	Pts	PIM
2017–18	Vityaz Podolsk	Russia U16	23	2	3	5	8	—	—	—	—	—
2018–19	Vityaz Podolsk	Russia U17	20	3	7	10	30	—	—	—	—	—
2018–19	Vityaz Podolsk	Russia U18	6	1	4	5	2	7	0	2	2	4
2019–20	SKA-1946	MHL	40	4	9	13	12	—	—	—	—	—
2020–21	SKA-1946	MHL	8	0	4	4	4	2	1	0	1	4
2020–21	SKA Saint Petersburg	KHL	29	0	3	3	0	6	0	1	1	2
2020–21	SKA-Neva	VHL	4	1	1	2	2	—	—	—	—	—
2021–22	SKA Saint Petersburg	KHL	24	0	4	4	4	—	—	—	—	—
2021–22	SKA-1946	MHL	3	1	2	3	2	7	1	1	2	4
2021–22	SKA-Neva	VHL	3	1	1	2	0	17	3	2	5	2
2022–23	SKA Saint Petersburg	KHL	9	0	1	1	2	—	—	—	—	—
2022–23	SKA-1946	MHL	5	2	3	5	0	—	—	—	—	—
2022–23	SKA-Neva	VHL	31	4	10	14	14	—	—	—	—	—
2023–24	HC Vityaz	KHL	2	0	0	0	2	—	—	—	—	—
2023–24	HC Ryazan	VHL	6	1	3	4	2	—	—	—	—	—
2023–24	Torpedo Nizhny Novgorod	KHL	22	2	2	4	2	—	—	—	—	—
2024–25	Torpedo Nizhny Novgorod	KHL	34	3	4	7	8	2	0	0	0	0
2024–25	Torpedo-Gorky NN	VHL	28	1	6	7	14	19	1	4	5	8
2025–26	Ontario Reign	AHL	68	4	9	13	10	5	0	0	0	0
KHL totals			120	5	14	19	18	8	0	1	1	2

=== International ===
Year	Team	Event	Result	GP	G	A	Pts	PIM
2018	Russia	U17	1st place, gold medalist(s)	6	0	2	2	2
2019	Russia	HG18	1st place, gold medalist(s)	5	0	2	2	0
2021	Russia	WJC	4th	7	1	1	2	2
Junior totals				18	1	5	6	4
