= Santeri Hatakka =

Finnish ice hockey player (born 2001)

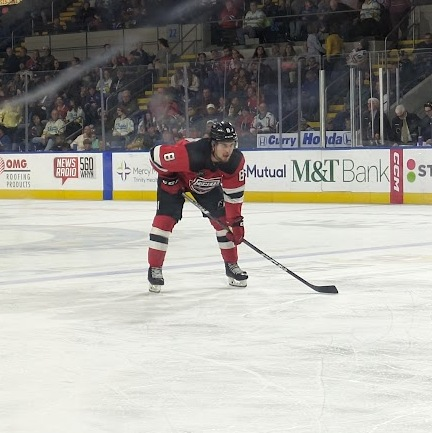
- Hatakka with the Utica Comets in 2023
- Born: 15 January 2001 (age 25) Riihimäki, Finland
- Height: 6 ft 0 in (183 cm)
- Weight: 182 lb (83 kg; 13 st 0 lb)
- Position: Defence
- Shoots: Left
- SHL team Former teams: HV71; Ilves; San Jose Sharks; New Jersey Devils
- NHL draft: 184th overall, 2019; San Jose Sharks
- Playing career: 2019–present

Santeri Hatakka (born 15 January 2001) is a Finnish professional ice hockey player who is a defenceman for HV71 of the Swedish Hockey League (SHL).

== Playing career ==
Hatakka played his junior career in the Jokerit system, and was an alternate captain for their under-20 team in the 2018–19 season. Following that season, he was drafted in the sixth round, 184th overall, of the 2019 NHL entry draft by the San Jose Sharks.

Hatakka made his professional debut during the 2019–20 season, splitting time between Ilves in the Liiga and their farm club Koovee. He scored three points in 28 Liiga games.

On 12 May 2021, Hatakka signed a three-year, entry-level contract with the Sharks. He made his NHL debut for the Sharks on 30 October, in a 2–1 win over the Winnipeg Jets. On 9 November, Hatakka recorded his first NHL point, an assist, in a 4–1 win over the Calgary Flames.

In the 2022–23 season Hatakka played just eight games, all at the AHL level, due to a major upper-body injury sustained early in the year. On 26 February 2023, Hatakka was traded to the New Jersey Devils along with Timo Meier in a multi-player trade. Hatakka was recalled to the Devils on 18 January 2024, as multiple of their regular defencemen were injured or sick. He made his debut for the team on 22 January, in a 6–5 overtime win against the Vegas Golden Knights.

After two seasons within the Devils organization, Hatakka left at the completion of his contract and left North America to sign a two-year contract with Swedish club, HV71 of the Swedish Hockey League (SHL), on 29 April 2025.

== International play ==
Hatakka has represented Finland at the under-16, under-17, under-18, and under-20 levels, including semifinal appearances at the 2020 and 2021 World Junior Ice Hockey Championships, at the latter of which he was an alternate captain and won a bronze medal. Across his two World Junior appearances, he scored three points in 14 games.

== Personal life ==
Hatakka's older sister is professional footballer Sanni Franssi.

== Career statistics ==
=== Regular season and playoffs ===
			Regular season					Playoffs
Season	Team	League	GP	G	A	Pts	PIM	GP	G	A	Pts	PIM
2017–18	Jokerit	U20 SM-liiga	46	4	12	16	28	—	—	—	—	—
2018–19	Jokerit	U20 SM-liiga	43	4	9	13	30	—	—	—	—	—
2019–20	Ilves	Liiga	28	1	2	3	14	—	—	—	—	—
2019–20	Koovee	Mestis	15	2	5	7	6	—	—	—	—	—
2020–21	Ilves	Liiga	44	1	6	7	34	5	0	0	0	2
2021–22	San Jose Sharks	NHL	9	0	2	2	2	—	—	—	—	—
2021–22	San Jose Barracuda	AHL	41	3	9	12	22	—	—	—	—	—
2022–23	San Jose Barracuda	AHL	8	0	2	2	2	—	—	—	—	—
2023–24	Utica Comets	AHL	48	5	15	20	32	—	—	—	—	—
2023–24	New Jersey Devils	NHL	12	0	2	2	4	—	—	—	—	—
2024–25	Utica Comets	AHL	19	1	1	2	20	—	—	—	—	—
NHL totals			21	0	4	4	6	—	—	—	—	—

=== International ===
Medal record

Men's ice hockey

Representing Finland

World Junior Championships
Bronze medal – third place	2021 Canada	

Year	Team	Event	Result	GP	G	A	Pts	PIM
2017	Finland	U17	6th	5	0	1	1	2
2019	Finland	U18	7th	5	0	0	0	2
2020	Finland	WJC	4th	7	0	1	1	4
2021	Finland	WJC	3rd place, bronze medalist(s)	7	1	1	2	4
Junior totals				24	1	3	4	12
