= Marat Khusnutdinov =

Russian ice hockey player (born 2002)

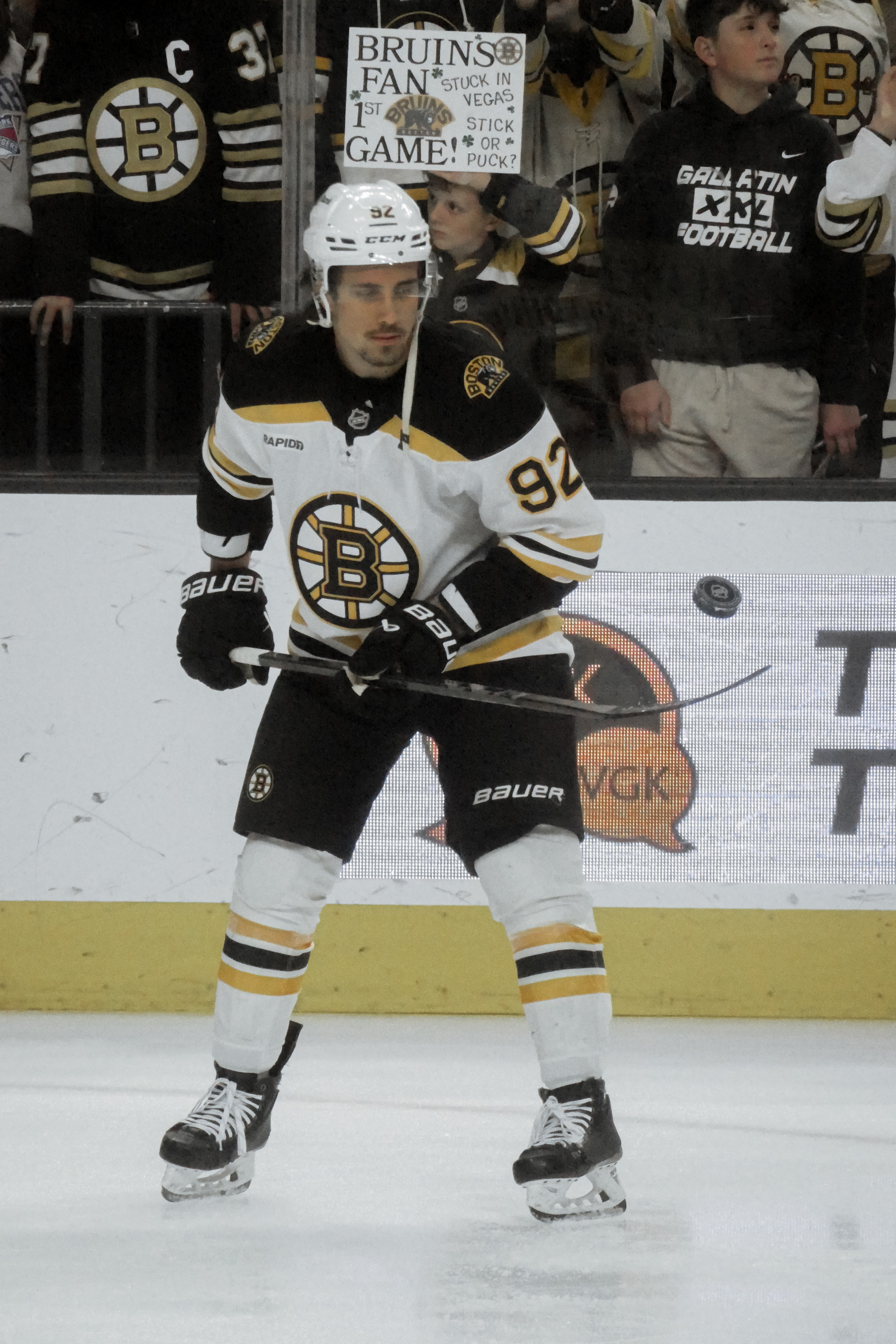
- Khusnutdinov with the Boston Bruins in 2025
- Born: 17 July 2002 (age 24) Moscow, Russia
- Height: 5 ft 11 in (180 cm)
- Weight: 184 lb (83 kg; 13 st 2 lb)
- Position: Centre
- Shoots: Left
- NHL team Former teams: Boston Bruins; SKA Saint Petersburg; HC Sochi; Minnesota Wild
- NHL draft: 37th overall, 2020; Minnesota Wild
- Playing career: 2019–present

Marat Azamatovich Khusnutdinov (Bashkir: Марат Азамат улы Хөснөтдинов, romanized: Marat Azamat ulı Xösnötdinov; Russian: Марат Азаматович Хуснутдинов; born 17 July 2002) is a Russian professional ice hockey player who is a centre and winger for the Boston Bruins of the National Hockey League (NHL). Khusnutdinov was drafted by the Minnesota Wild in the second round of the 2020 NHL entry draft with the 37th overall pick.

== Playing career ==
Khusnutdinov made his Kontinental Hockey League (KHL) debut for SKA Saint Petersburg during the 2020–21 season.

In the 2023–24 season, his fourth with SKA, Khusnutdinov went scoreless through six games before he was traded to HC Sochi in exchange for Borna Rendulić on 10 October 2023. He featured in 49 regular season games with Sochi, collecting six goals and 20 points, as the team finished out of postseason contention. After terminating the remainder of his contract with Sochi at the completion of the season, Khusnutdinov was immediately signed by the Minnesota Wild to a two-year, entry-level contract on 28 February 2024.

On 6 March 2025, Khusnutdinov was traded to the Boston Bruins, alongside Jakub Lauko and a 2026 sixth-round draft pick, in exchange for Justin Brazeau.

On 10 January 2026, Khusnutdinov scored four goals and an assist for a total of five points in a 10–2 win over the New York Rangers.

== Career statistics ==
=== Regular season and playoffs ===
| | | | Regular season | | | | | Playoffs |
| Season | Team | League | GP | G | A | Pts | PIM | GP | G | A | Pts | PIM |
|---|---|---|---|---|---|---|---|---|---|---|---|---|
| 2017–18 | Vityaz Podolsk | Russia U16 | 25 | 8 | 34 | 42 | 12 | — | — | — | — | — |
| 2017–18 | Vityaz Podolsk | Russia U17 | 11 | 8 | 10 | 18 | 2 | — | — | — | — | — |
| 2017–18 | Vityaz Podolsk | Russia U18 | 1 | 1 | 2 | 3 | 0 | 7 | 4 | 6 | 10 | 0 |
| 2019–20 | SKA-1946 | MHL | 44 | 13 | 25 | 38 | 16 | 2 | 0 | 0 | 0 | 2 |
| 2020–21 | SKA Saint Petersburg | KHL | 12 | 0 | 2 | 2 | 2 | — | — | — | — | — |
| 2020–21 | SKA-Neva | VHL | 4 | 1 | 0 | 1 | 2 | — | — | — | — | — |
| 2020–21 | SKA-1946 | MHL | 10 | 3 | 11 | 14 | 6 | — | — | — | — | — |
| 2021–22 | SKA Saint Petersburg | KHL | 32 | 5 | 7 | 12 | 8 | 16 | 1 | 3 | 4 | 6 |
| 2021–22 | SKA-1946 | MHL | — | — | — | — | — | 4 | 1 | 0 | 1 | 2 |
| 2022–23 | SKA Saint Petersburg | KHL | 63 | 11 | 30 | 41 | 18 | 16 | 1 | 6 | 7 | 6 |
| 2023–24 | SKA Saint Petersburg | KHL | 6 | 0 | 0 | 0 | 0 | — | — | — | — | — |
| 2023–24 | HC Sochi | KHL | 49 | 6 | 14 | 20 | 10 | — | — | — | — | — |
| 2023–24 | Minnesota Wild | NHL | 16 | 1 | 3 | 4 | 6 | — | — | — | — | — |
| 2024–25 | Minnesota Wild | NHL | 57 | 2 | 5 | 7 | 14 | — | — | — | — | — |
| 2024–25 | Boston Bruins | NHL | 18 | 3 | 2 | 5 | 6 | — | — | — | — | — |
| 2025–26 | Boston Bruins | NHL | 77 | 15 | 18 | 33 | 16 | 6 | 0 | 0 | 0 | 2 |
| KHL totals | | | 162 | 22 | 53 | 75 | 38 | 32 | 2 | 9 | 11 | 12 |
| NHL totals | | | 168 | 21 | 28 | 49 | 42 | 6 | 0 | 0 | 0 | 2 |

=== International ===
| Year | Team | Event | Result | GP | G | A | Pts | PIM |
|---|---|---|---|---|---|---|---|---|
| 2018 | Russia | U17 | 1st place, gold medalist(s) | 6 | 2 | 3 | 5 | 0 |
| 2019 | Russia | HG18 | 1st place, gold medalist(s) | 5 | 0 | 3 | 3 | 2 |
| 2019 | Russia | U18 | 2nd place, silver medalist(s) | 7 | 1 | 2 | 3 | 4 |
| 2021 | Russia | WJC | 4th | 7 | 2 | 3 | 5 | 2 |
| Junior totals | | | | 25 | 5 | 11 | 16 | 8 |
