= Jack Quinn (ice hockey) =

Canadian ice hockey player (born 2001)

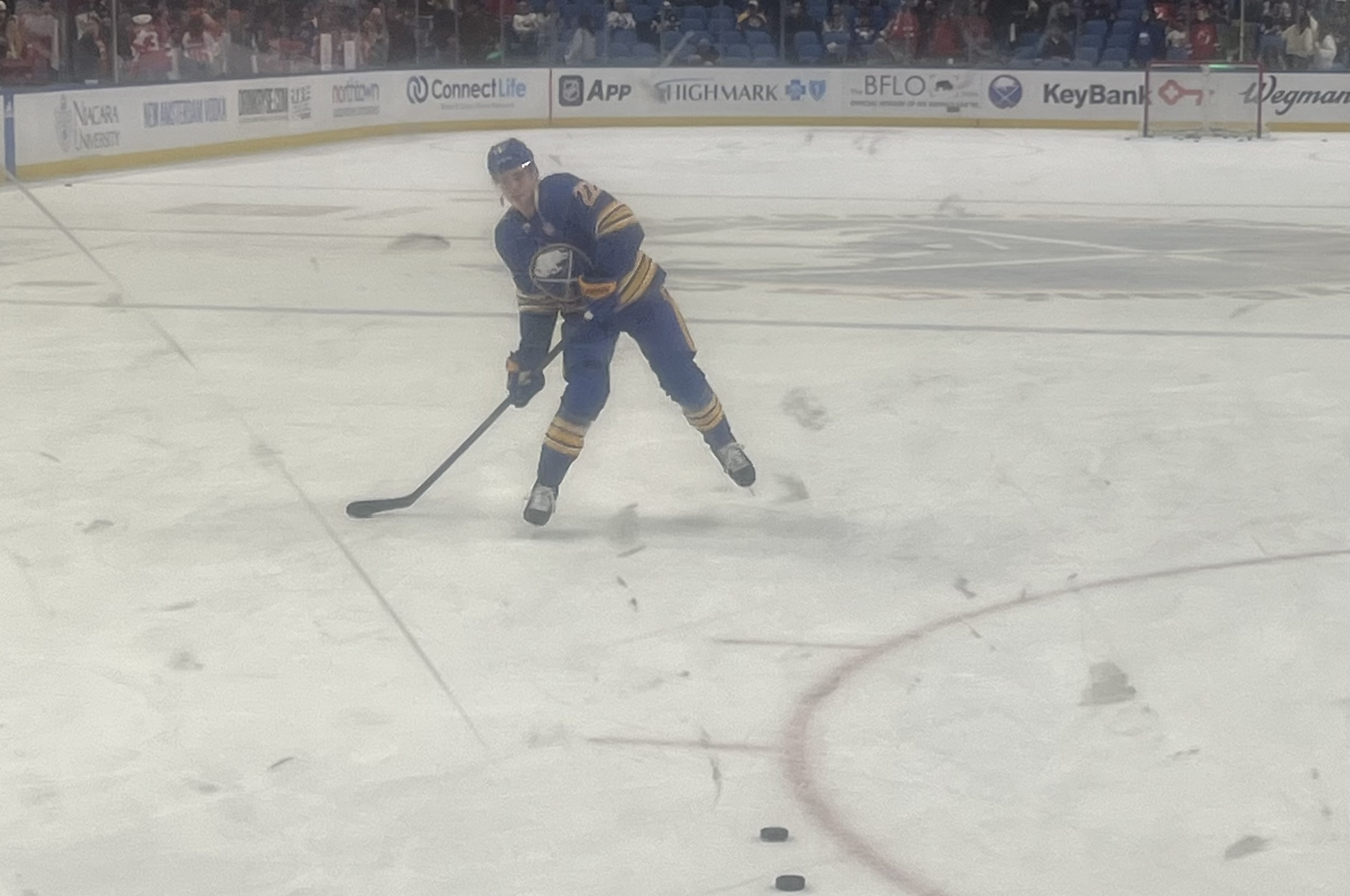
- Born: September 19, 2001 (age 25) Cobden, Ontario, Canada
- Height: 6 ft 0 in (183 cm)
- Weight: 185 lb (84 kg; 13 st 3 lb)
- Position: Right wing
- Shoots: Right
- NHL team: Buffalo Sabres
- National team: Canada
- NHL draft: 8th overall, 2020; Buffalo Sabres
- Playing career: 2021–present

Jack Quinn (born September 19, 2001) is a Canadian professional ice hockey player who is a right winger for the Buffalo Sabres of the National Hockey League (NHL). He was drafted eighth overall by the Sabres in the 2020 NHL entry draft.

== Playing career ==
Quinn was selected in the second round, 39th overall, by the Ottawa 67's during the 2017 Ontario Hockey League (OHL) Priority Selection. He spent the majority of the subsequent season with the Kanata Lasers of the Central Canada Hockey League (CCHL) while also appearing in eight games for the 67's. Quinn's rookie season in 2018–19 saw him score 12 goals and 20 assists in 61 games. He also went scoreless in two postseason games. Quinn's draft year was far more productive; he recorded 52 goals and 37 assists for 89 points in 62 games. His goal totals placed him second overall, just three behind Peterborough Petes' forward Nick Robertson.

At the 2020 NHL entry draft, Quinn was selected eighth overall by the Buffalo Sabres. On November 16, 2020, he signed a three-year, entry-level contract with the organization.

Due to the 2020–21 OHL season being postponed due to the COVID-19 pandemic, Quinn skated in 15 games for the Sabres' American Hockey League (AHL) affiliate, the Rochester Americans. His year was ended prematurely, however, as he underwent season-ending hernia surgery in late-April. He finished his first professional campaign with two goals and seven assists for the Americans.

On January 11, 2022, Quinn made his NHL debut; he went scoreless in a 6–1 defeat to the Tampa Bay Lightning. Quinn was reassigned to the Americans the following day. On January 20, 2022, Quinn scored his first NHL goal and added an assist in a 5–4 defeat to the Dallas Stars.

In the 2023–24 NHL season Quinn missed the first 32 games of the season due to an Achilles tendon injury. He played in 27 games before a separate lower-body injury ended his season in February.

On March 10, 2026, Quinn scored his first career hat-trick in a 6–3 in over the San Jose Sharks.

== International play ==
In the 2021 World Juniors Quinn scored one goal and four assists across seven games for team Canada.

Medal record

Representing Canada

Ice hockey

World Championships
| Gold medal – first place | 2023 Finland/Latvia | |

World Junior Championships
| Silver medal – second place | 2021 Canada | |

In 2023 Quinn competed in the IIHF World Championship for team Canada during which the team won gold.

== Personal life ==
While playing with the 67's Quinn lived with his father, Dan, a government worker, in Ottawa instead of billeting. He has a sister Holly who is two years younger than him.

== Career statistics ==
=== Regular season and playoffs ===
| | | | Regular season | | | | | Playoffs |
| Season | Team | League | GP | G | A | Pts | PIM | GP | G | A | Pts | PIM |
|---|---|---|---|---|---|---|---|---|---|---|---|---|
| 2017–18 | Kanata Lasers | CCHL | 49 | 21 | 25 | 46 | 24 | 4 | 0 | 1 | 1 | 0 |
| 2017–18 | Ottawa 67's | OHL | 8 | 0 | 1 | 1 | 0 | 2 | 0 | 0 | 0 | 0 |
| 2018–19 | Ottawa 67's | OHL | 61 | 12 | 20 | 32 | 23 | 18 | 3 | 4 | 7 | 0 |
| 2019–20 | Ottawa 67's | OHL | 62 | 52 | 37 | 89 | 32 | — | — | — | — | — |
| 2020–21 | Rochester Americans | AHL | 15 | 2 | 7 | 9 | 8 | — | — | — | — | — |
| 2021–22 | Rochester Americans | AHL | 45 | 26 | 35 | 61 | 23 | 10 | 0 | 2 | 2 | 6 |
| 2021–22 | Buffalo Sabres | NHL | 2 | 1 | 1 | 2 | 0 | — | — | — | — | — |
| 2022–23 | Buffalo Sabres | NHL | 75 | 14 | 23 | 37 | 15 | — | — | — | — | — |
| 2023–24 | Buffalo Sabres | NHL | 27 | 9 | 10 | 19 | 8 | — | — | — | — | — |
| 2024–25 | Buffalo Sabres | NHL | 74 | 15 | 24 | 39 | 18 | — | — | — | — | — |
| 2025–26 | Buffalo Sabres | NHL | 82 | 20 | 31 | 51 | 18 | 13 | 2 | 5 | 7 | 0 |
| NHL totals | | | 260 | 59 | 89 | 148 | 59 | 13 | 2 | 5 | 7 | 0 |

=== International ===
| Year | Team | Event | Result | GP | G | A | Pts | PIM |
|---|---|---|---|---|---|---|---|---|
| 2021 | Canada | WJC | 2nd place, silver medalist(s) | 7 | 1 | 4 | 5 | 0 |
| 2023 | Canada | WC | 1st place, gold medalist(s) | 10 | 2 | 5 | 7 | 2 |
| Junior totals | | | | 7 | 1 | 4 | 5 | 0 |
| Senior totals | | | | 10 | 2 | 5 | 7 | 2 |

== Awards and honours ==
| Award | Year |
CCHL
| All-Rookie Team | 2018 |
| Rookie of the Year | 2018 |
| Top Prospect Award | 2018 |
CHL
| CHL Top Prospects Game | 2020 |
AHL
| All-Rookie Team | 2022 |
| Dudley "Red" Garrett Memorial Award | 2022 |

Awards and achievements
| Preceded by Ryan Johnson | Buffalo Sabres first-round draft pick 2020 | Succeeded by Owen Power |
