= Eemil Viro =

Finnish ice hockey player (born 2002)

- Born: 3 April 2002 (age 24) Vantaa, Finland
- Height: 6 ft 0 in (183 cm)
- Weight: 168 lb (76 kg; 12 st 0 lb)
- Position: Defence
- Shoots: Left
- SHL team Former teams: Malmö Redhawks; HC TPS
- NHL draft: 70th overall, 2020; Detroit Red Wings
- Playing career: 2019–present

Eemil Viro (born 3 April 2002) is a Finnish professional ice hockey defenceman currently playing for the Malmö Redhawks of the Swedish Hockey League (SHL). Viro was drafted 70th overall by the Detroit Red Wings in the 2020 NHL entry draft. He formerly playing in the Finnish Liiga with HC TPS.

== Playing career ==
On 21 May 2021, Viro was signed by the Detroit Red Wings to a three-year, entry-level contract. He played out the duration of his contract within the Red Wings organization with affiliates, the Grand Rapids Griffins in the American Hockey League (AHL) and the Toledo Walleye of the ECHL.

As a pending restricted free agent with the Red Wings, Viro returned to Europe in signing a two-year contract with Swedish outfit, Malmö Redhawks of the SHL, on 5 June 2025.

== Personal life ==
Viro's twin sister, Eerika Viro, plays ringette in the Finnish semi-professional ringette league SM Ringette, (formerly known as Ringeten SM-sarja), for VG-62. More recently she played for the Finland national ringette team's, 2022 Team Finland Junior (U21) team which competed in the 2022 World Ringette Championships and won against Team Canada U21.

Medal record

Ice hockey

Representing Finland

World Junior Championships
Silver medal – second place	2022 Canada	
Bronze medal – third place	2021 Canada	

== Career statistics ==
=== Regular season and playoffs ===
			Regular season					Playoffs
Season	Team	League	GP	G	A	Pts	PIM	GP	G	A	Pts	PIM
2018–19	HC TPS	Jr. A	4	0	1	1	0	—	—	—	—	—
2019–20	HC TPS	Jr. A	15	1	5	6	14	2	2	0	2	0
2019–20	HC TPS	Liiga	29	0	3	3	8	—	—	—	—	—
2020–21	HC TPS	Liiga	53	4	10	14	24	13	3	1	4	31
2021–22	HC TPS	Liiga	52	3	4	7	55	15	2	3	5	4
2022–23	Grand Rapids Griffins	AHL	48	1	7	8	14	—	—	—	—	—
2022–23	Toledo Walleye	ECHL	5	0	3	3	2	13	1	1	2	4
2023–24	Grand Rapids Griffins	AHL	32	1	5	6	6	—	—	—	—	—
2024–25	Grand Rapids Griffins	AHL	62	1	4	5	40	1	0	0	0	0
Liiga totals			134	7	17	24	87	28	5	4	9	31

=== International ===
Year	Team	Event	Result	GP	G	A	Pts	PIM
2018	Finland	U17	2nd place, silver medalist(s)	6	0	0	0	2
2019	Finland	HG18	4th	3	0	0	0	0
2021	Finland	WJC	3rd place, bronze medalist(s)	7	0	2	2	4
2022	Finland	WJC	2nd place, silver medalist(s)	7	0	1	1	4
Junior totals				23	0	3	3	10
