= Ryan Johnson (ice hockey, born 2001) =

American ice hockey player (born 2001)

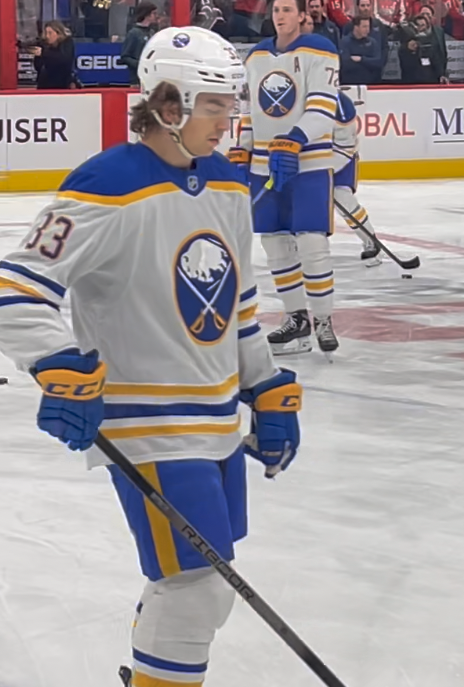
- Johnson with the Buffalo Sabres in 2024
- Born: July 24, 2001 (age 25) Irvine, California, U.S.
- Height: 6 ft 0 in (183 cm)
- Weight: 195 lb (88 kg; 13 st 13 lb)
- Position: Defense
- Shoots: Left
- NHL team (P) Cur. team Former teams: Pittsburgh Penguins; WBS Penguins (AHL); Buffalo Sabres
- NHL draft: 31st overall, 2019; Buffalo Sabres
- Playing career: 2023–present

Ryan Johnson (born July 24, 2001) is an American professional ice hockey player who is a defenseman for the Wilkes-Barre/Scranton Penguins of the American Hockey League (AHL) while under contract to the Pittsburgh Penguins of the National Hockey League (NHL). He was drafted in the first round, 31st overall, by the Buffalo Sabres in the 2019 NHL entry draft.

== Playing career ==
Johnson played with the Sioux Falls Stampede in the United States Hockey League (USHL) before he was drafted 31st overall by the Buffalo Sabres in the first round of the 2019 NHL entry draft. He committed to a collegiate career with the University of Minnesota in the Big Ten Conference (B1G).

After completing his college career, he signed a two-year entry-level contract with the Sabres in May 2023 and was assigned to AHL affiliate, the Rochester Americans as that team was playing in the AHL Eastern Conference finals.

In the 2023–24 season, Johnson achieved a major career milestone by making his debut in the National Hockey League. This moment came on November 4, 2023, when he suited up for a game against the Toronto Maple Leafs. His call-up followed a strong performance with the Rochester Americans, the AHL affiliate of his NHL team.

On October 12, 2026, Johnson was traded by the Sabres to the Pittsburgh Penguins in exchange for Caleb Jones and Daniel Laatsch.

== Personal life ==
Johnson's father is former NHL forward Craig Johnson who was a draft pick of the St. Louis Blues in the 1990 NHL entry draft and played 557 games in the NHL for the St. Louis Blues, Los Angeles Kings, Toronto Maple Leafs, Washington Capitals and the Mighty Ducks of Anaheim. Ryan was born in Irvine, California, while Craig was playing for the Kings.

== Career statistics ==
Medal record

Men's ice hockey

Representing the United States

World Junior Championships
Gold medal – first place	2021 Canada	

=== Regular season and playoffs ===
			Regular season					Playoffs
Season	Team	League	GP	G	A	Pts	PIM	GP	G	A	Pts	PIM
2016–17	Anaheim Jr. Ducks	T1EHL	32	3	21	24	10	4	0	4	4	4
2017–18	Anaheim Jr. Ducks	T1EHL	35	12	33	45	36	—	—	—	—	—
2018–19	Sioux Falls Stampede	USHL	54	6	19	25	26	12	2	6	8	4
2019–20	University of Minnesota	B1G	37	0	8	8	20	—	—	—	—	—
2020–21	University of Minnesota	B1G	27	2	12	14	12	—	—	—	—	—
2021–22	University of Minnesota	B1G	39	3	16	19	14	—	—	—	—	—
2022–23	University of Minnesota	B1G	40	4	14	18	8	—	—	—	—	—
2023–24	Rochester Americans	AHL	27	0	9	9	6	5	0	1	1	2
2023–24	Buffalo Sabres	NHL	41	0	7	7	12	—	—	—	—	—
2024–25	Rochester Americans	AHL	66	2	11	13	38	8	0	1	1	8
2024–25	Buffalo Sabres	NHL	3	0	0	0	4	—	—	—	—	—
2025–26	Buffalo Sabres	NHL	3	0	0	0	2	—	—	—	—	—
2025–26	Rochester Americans	AHL	56	5	14	19	40	2	1	1	2	2
2026–27	Rochester Americans	AHL	4	0	0	0	2	—	—	—	—	—
NHL totals			47	0	7	7	18	—	—	—	—	—

=== International ===
Year	Team	Event	Result	GP	G	A	Pts	PIM
2019	United States	WJAC	1st place, gold medalist(s)	6	0	0	0	2
2021	United States	WJC	1st place, gold medalist(s)	7	1	3	4	6
Junior totals				13	1	3	4	8

== Awards and honors ==
Award	Year
USHL
All-Rookie Team	2019
Clark Cup champion	2019

Awards and achievements
Preceded by Dylan Cozens	Buffalo Sabres first-round draft pick 2019	Succeeded by Jack Quinn
