= Arthur Kaliyev =

Uzbekistani-American ice hockey player (born 2001)

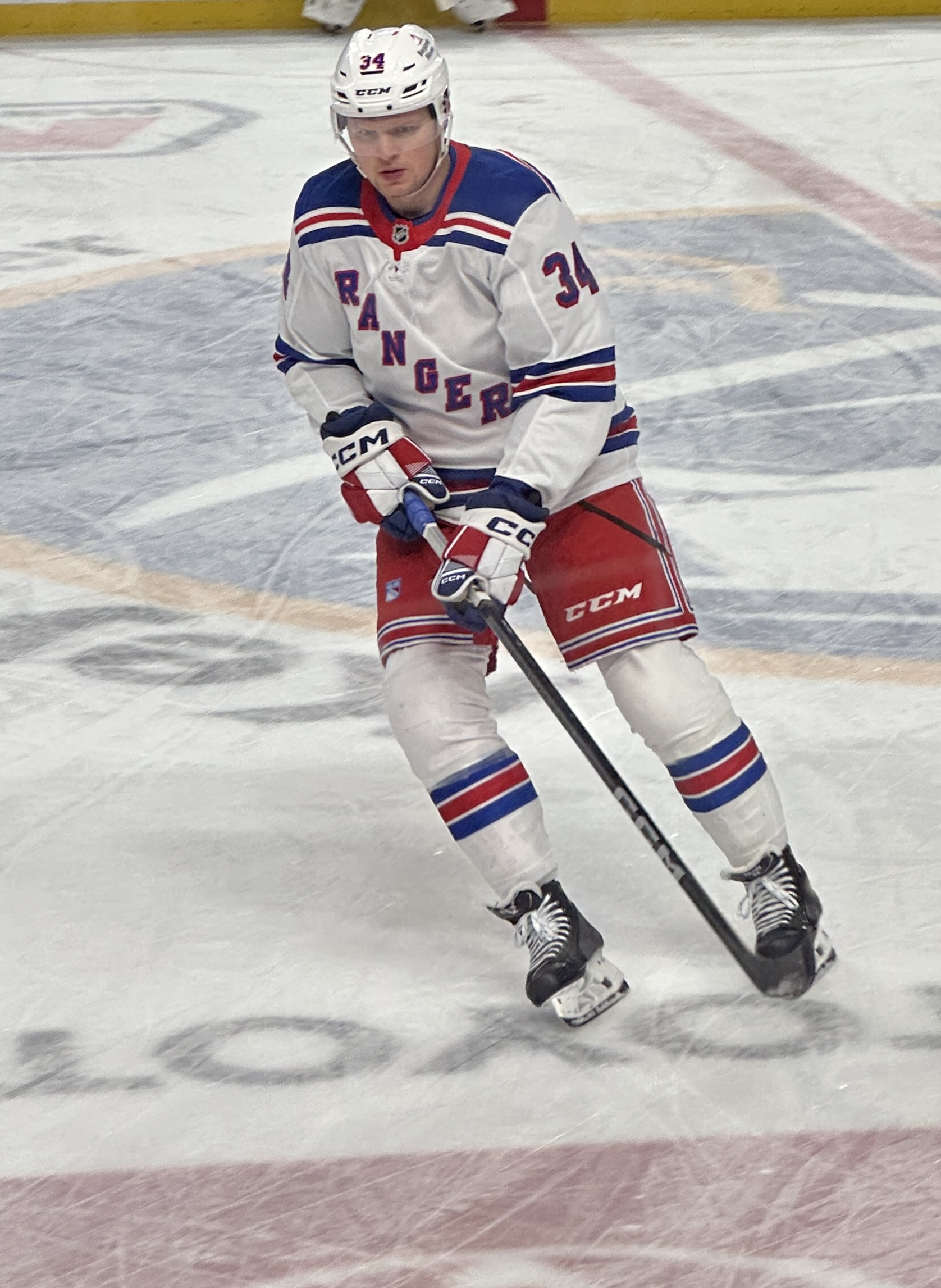
- Kaliyev with the New York Rangers in 2025
- Born: June 26, 2001 (age 25) Tashkent, Uzbekistan
- Height: 6 ft 2 in (188 cm)
- Weight: 212 lb (96 kg; 15 st 2 lb)
- Position: Forward
- Shoots: Left
- AHL team Former teams: Iowa Wild; Los Angeles Kings; New York Rangers; Ottawa Senators
- NHL draft: 33rd overall, 2019; Los Angeles Kings
- Playing career: 2021–present

Arthur Kaliyev (Russian: Артур Калиев; born June 26, 2001) is an Uzbekistan-born American professional ice hockey player who is a forward for the Iowa Wild in the American Hockey League (AHL). He was selected by the Los Angeles Kings in the second round, 33rd overall, of the 2019 NHL entry draft. He also played for the New York Rangers and Ottawa Senators.

== Early life ==
Kaliyev was born in Tashkent, Uzbekistan, but his family moved to Staten Island, New York when he was two years old and later moved to Michigan at age 13. He represents the United States in international competition. His younger sister Elvina Kalieva, who was born in the United States, is a professional tennis player.

== Playing career ==
=== Amateur ===
Kaliyev played junior hockey with Detroit Compuware U16. He was selected by the Hamilton Bulldogs of the Ontario Hockey League (OHL) in the second round, 26th overall, of the 2017 OHL Priority Draft. As a rookie in 2017–18, Kaliyev scored 31 goals, 17 assists for 48 points in 68 regular season games, setting new franchise records for goals and points by a rookie. The Bulldogs advanced to the league championship and knocked off the Sault Ste. Marie Greyhounds to win the J. Ross Robertson Cup. In 21 playoff games, Kaliyev added three goals and 11 points. As league champions, the Bulldogs were one of four teams invited to take part in the 2018 Memorial Cup, a round-robin tournament that pitted the three league champions from across the Canadian Hockey League (CHL), plus one host team, against each other. Hamilton was eliminated from contention in the semifinal by the Regina Pats and finished third in the tournament.

He followed that with 51 goals and 102 points for the Bulldogs in 2018–19, the youngest player in the OHL to score more than 40 goals that season and the first Bulldog to record 50 goals or 100 points. He was selected to play in the 2019 Sherwin-Williams CHL/NHL Top Prospects Game. The Bulldogs qualified for the playoffs but were eliminated in the first round by the Ottawa 67's. In four playoff games, he tallied one goal and two points. In his final season with Hamilton in 2019–20, he recorded 44 goals and 98 points in 57 games before the season was cancelled on March 18, 2020 due to the COVID-19 pandemic.

=== Professional ===
==== Los Angeles Kings ====
Despite his goal-scoring prowess, he was regarded as inconsistent, a weak skater, and a weak defender before the National Hockey League (NHL)'s 2019 entry draft. Kaliyev was subsequently selected in the second round with the 33rd overall pick by the Los Angeles Kings. On June 3, 2020, Kaliyev was signed to a three-year, entry-level contract by the Kings. He began the pandemic-shortened 2020–21 season with the Kings' American Hockey League (AHL) affiliate, the Ontario Reign. He spent the majority of the season with the Reign, marking 14 goals and 31 points in 40 games. He was recalled by the Kings and made his NHL debut on February 2, 2021, in a 3–1 loss against the Anaheim Ducks and scored his first goal. He was returned to the Reign and the team qualified for the abbreviated 2021 Calder Cup playoffs. Ontario was eliminated in the opening round by the Colorado Eagles. Kaliyev went scoreless in the playoffs.

Kaliyev opened the 2021–22 season on the Kings roster. In his first NHL full season, he played primarily on the fourth line alongside Blake Lizotte and Brendan Lemieux. In 80 games he scored 14 goals and 27 points in the regular season. The team finished third in the Pacific Division, and faced the Edmonton Oilers in the first round, renewing their rivalry. The best-of-seven game series went all the way, decided in the final game, as the Kings were defeated by the Oilers. In the seven games, Kaliyev went scoreless. In the 2022–23 season, he remained on the fourth line, but saw time on the team's power play alongside Viktor Arvidsson. He missed time in December with a lower body injury after blocking a shot. He finished the season with 13 goals and 28 points in 56 games. The Kings finished third in the division again and faced the Oilers in the first round for the second consecutive season. The Oilers eliminated the Kings, with Kaliyev appearing two of the playoff games, going scoreless.

Entering the 2023–24 season, he was suspended by the NHL for two pre-season exhibition games and two regular season games after an illegal hit (kneeing) on Chase De Leo of the Anaheim Ducks in a preseason game. He started off the season well, but in the second half, his play cratered and coach Todd McLellan began to scratch him from the lineup. After McLellan was fired, new coach Jim Hiller continued scratching him in favor of a seventh defenseman, with Kaliyev playing just six games after the March trade deadline and not at all in the Kings' postseason. He ended the season with seven goals and 15 points in 51 games. On September 18, 2024, the Kings re-signed Kaliyev to a one-year contract.

During the 2024–25 preseason, on the second day of training camp on September 22, Kaliyev suffered a broken clavicle. He was out of the lineup for the remainder of training camp and the regular season until December. Upon his return from the injury, he was assigned to the AHL on a conditioning loan, joining the Reign on December 10. He appeared in five games for the Reign, scoring one goal and two points. After his conditioning loan ended, he was placed on waivers on January 5, 2025, with the intent of assigning him to the Reign.

==== New York Rangers ====
On January 6, 2025, Kaliyev was claimed off waivers by the New York Rangers. He made his Rangers debut on January 9 in a 3–2 overtime victory over the New Jersey Devils. He scored his first goal for the Rangers on January 16, in a 5–3 victory over the Utah Hockey Club. He played in 14 games for the Rangers before his season ended due to injury on March 11, recording three goals and four points. Kaliyev was a restricted free agent after the season, but the Rangers declined to make a qualifying offer, making him an unrestricted free agent.

==== Ottawa Senators ====
Kaliyev signed a one-year, two-way contract with the Ottawa Senators on July 2, 2025. He began the season with Ottawa's AHL affiliate, the Belleville Senators, after clearing waivers. He was recalled by Ottawa on October 16 to replace the injured Brady Tkachuk. He made his Senators' debut that night against the Seattle Kraken. He tallied his first point for Ottawa on October 18 in a 5–4 loss to the New York Islanders, assisting on David Perron's power play goal in the first period. He was returned to Belleville on October 20. He was selected to represent Belleville at the 2026 AHL All-Star Classic in February 2026. He spent the rest of the season with Belleville, tallying 40 goals and 68 points in 70 games. Kaliyev was named to the AHL's First All-Star Team in April. A restricted free agent going into the 2026 offseason, Ottawa declined to make him a qualifying offer, making him an unrestricted free agent.

On October 29, 2026, Kaliyev signed a professional try-out contract with the Iowa Wild of the AHL.

== International play ==
Medal record

Men's ice hockey

Representing United States

World Junior Championships
Gold medal – first place	2021 Canada	

Kaliyev was selected to represent the United States' junior team at the 2020 World Junior Championships. He led the team in goal scoring with four and added two assists for six points in five games. The team was knocked out in the quarterfinals by Finland. He returned to the US junior team for the 2021 World Junior Championships. Kaliyev scored the game-winning goal to beat Finland for a spot in the final. He earned a gold medal with the United States' 2–0 victory over Canada in the final.

== Career statistics ==
=== Regular season and playoffs ===
			Regular season					Playoffs
Season	Team	League	GP	G	A	Pts	PIM	GP	G	A	Pts	PIM
2017–18	Hamilton Bulldogs	OHL	68	31	17	48	20	21	3	8	11	6
2018–19	Hamilton Bulldogs	OHL	67	51	51	102	22	4	1	1	2	0
2019–20	Hamilton Bulldogs	OHL	57	44	54	98	28	—	—	—	—	—
2020–21	Los Angeles Kings	NHL	1	1	0	1	0	—	—	—	—	—
2020–21	Ontario Reign	AHL	40	14	17	31	24	1	0	0	0	0
2021–22	Los Angeles Kings	NHL	80	14	13	27	37	7	0	0	0	2
2022–23	Los Angeles Kings	NHL	56	13	15	28	12	—	—	—	—	—
2023–24	Los Angeles Kings	NHL	51	7	8	15	14	2	0	0	0	0
2024–25	Ontario Reign	AHL	5	1	1	2	8	—	—	—	—	—
2024–25	New York Rangers	NHL	14	3	1	4	2	—	—	—	—	—
2025–26	Belleville Senators	AHL	70	40	28	68	30	—	—	—	—	—
2025–26	Ottawa Senators	NHL	2	0	1	1	0	—	—	—	—	—
NHL totals			204	38	38	76	65	9	0	0	0	2

=== International ===
Year	Team	Event	GP	G	A	Pts	PIM
2018	United States	HG18	5	3	3	6	0
2020	United States	WJC	5	4	2	6	4
2021	United States	WJC	7	3	5	8	4
Junior totals			17	10	10	20	8

== Bibliography ==
- Chaimovitch, Jason, ed. (2025). 2025–2026 American Hockey League Official Guide & Record Book. Springfield, Massachusetts: American Hockey League. OCLC 22147888.
