= 2021 World Junior Ice Hockey Championships =

2021 edition of the World Junior Ice Hockey Championships

2021 IIHF World Junior Championships

Tournament details
- Host country: Canada
- Venue: Rogers Place (in 1 host city)
- Dates: December 25, 2020 – January 5, 2021
- Teams: 10

Final positions
- Champions: United States (5th title)
- Runners-up: Canada
- Third place: Finland
- Fourth place: Russia

Tournament statistics
- Games played: 28
- Goals scored: 176 (6.29 per game)
- Scoring leader: (United States) Trevor Zegras (18 points)

Awards
- MVP: (United States) Trevor Zegras

The 2021 World Junior Ice Hockey Championships (2021 WJHC) was the 45th edition of the Ice Hockey World Junior Championship, held from 25 December 2020 to 5 January 2021. This marked the 16th time that Canada hosted the WJIHC. Due to the COVID-19 pandemic in Canada, it was hosted in a "bubble" behind closed doors in Edmonton, Alberta, with no spectators admitted for any game.

The 2021 championships were the first in which all pre-tournament and in-tournament games were broadcast by The Sports Network. Since the tournament began on Christmas Day, executive producer Paul Graham anticipated a boost in viewer ratings.

== Background ==
On 6 December 2018, it was announced that Edmonton and Red Deer, in the province of Alberta, would be the host cities. It was the third time Edmonton had been selected to host the tournament, after previously hosting in 1995 and 2012, and the first to use Rogers Place as a venue.

Due to the COVID-19 pandemic, the IIHF cancelled all lower-division U20 championships on September 17, 2020 (thus there was no promotion or relegation), and announced that the top division tournament would be hosted solely by Edmonton using a "bubble" strategy similar to what was used for the NHL's 2020 Stanley Cup playoffs in Edmonton and Toronto. This decision resulted in the elimination of Red Deer as the secondary host city of the 2021 tournament. All games were held behind closed doors with no outside spectators. It was subsequently announced that Edmonton and Red Deer would host the 2022 tournament, and that Gothenburg, Sweden would be shifted from 2022 to 2024.

On 19 October 2020, the full schedule for the tournament was announced, with play beginning on Christmas for the first time since the 2004–05 edition.

On 25 November 2020, Hockey Canada suspended its selection camp and quarantined all players for a fortnight (retroactive to November 23) due to two positive COVID-19 tests among participants. Swedish head coach Tomas Montén, along with two assistant leaders, and four players (William Eklund, Karl Henriksson, William Wallinder, and Albin Grewe) from the Swedish preliminary roster had to leave the team after having tested positive for COVID-19 very close to the beginning of the championship.

Team Canada captain Kirby Dach sustained an injury in Canada's pre-tournament game against Russia, and was ruled out for the rest of the tournament.

Nine German players were quarantined under COVID-19 protocols through the first two games due to positive tests prior to the tournament. No new COVID-19 positives were detected within the bubble through the conclusion of the tournament.

Blackhawks prospect and 2020 first rounder and Team Germany forward Lukas Reichel was unable to play at the tournament, after having tested positive for COVID-19.

== Top Division ==
=== Venue ===
Edmonton	Edmonton is located in Canada
Rogers Place Capacity: 18,347	Edmonton is located in Canada

=== Match officials ===
The following officials were assigned by the IIHF to officiate the 2021 World Junior Championships. All officials are Canadian due to restrictions from COVID-19 pandemic on travel and ease of getting officials on site.

Referees

- (Canada) Adam Bloski
- (Canada) Michael Campbell
- (Canada) Alexandre Garon
- (Canada) Olivier Gouin
- (Canada) Kyle Kowalski
- (Canada) Guillaume Labonté
- (Canada) Mike Langin
- (Canada) Fraser Lawrence
- (Canada) Kevin Maille
- (Canada) Mathieu Menniti
- (Canada) Mark Pearce
- (Canada) Brett Roeland
- (Canada) Carter Sandlak
- (Canada) Tyson Stewart

Linesmen

- (Canada) Guillaume Brunelle
- (Canada) Maxime Chaput
- (Canada) Jonathan Deschamps
- (Canada) Deion Foster
- (Canada) Adam Harris
- (Canada) Brett Mackey
- (Canada) Kelsey Mahoney
- (Canada) Matthew Mannella
- (Canada) Michael McGowan
- (Canada) Ben O'Quinn
- (Canada) Nathan Vanoosten
- (Canada) Tarrington Wyonzek

=== Preliminary round ===
==== Seeding ====
Seeds for the preliminary round were based on the 2020 tournament's final standings using the serpentine system. The IIHF announced the groups on 5 January 2020, with Austria being promoted from Division I A, after having won the 2020 Division I A Tournament.

Group A
(Rogers Place)

- Canada (1)
- Finland (4)
- Switzerland (5)
- Slovakia (8)
- Germany (9)

Group B
(Rogers Place)

- Russia (2)
- Sweden (3)
- United States (6)
- Czech Republic (7)
- Austria (11-Promoted)

==== Group A ====
Pos	Team	Pld	W	OTW	OTL	L	GF	GA	GD	Pts	Qualification
1	Canada (H)	4	4	0	0	0	33	4	+29	12	Quarterfinals
2	Finland	4	3	0	0	1	16	8	+8	9	Quarterfinals
3	Germany	4	1	1	0	2	14	28	−14	5	Quarterfinals
4	Slovakia	4	1	0	1	2	5	13	−8	4	Quarterfinals
5	Switzerland	4	0	0	0	4	5	20	−15	0	

Source: IIHF
(H) Host

25 December 2020; 12:00	Switzerland	0–1 (0–0, 0–0, 0–1)	Slovakia	Rogers Place, Edmonton; Attendance: 0

Game reference
Thibault Fatton	Goalies	Simon Latkoczy	Referees: (Canada) Fraser Lawrence (Canada) Carter Sandlak; Linesmen: (Canada) Maxime Chaput (Canada) Adam Harris
0–1 / 54:17 – Faith (Nemec, Mrázik)			Referees: (Canada) Fraser Lawrence (Canada) Carter Sandlak; Linesmen: (Canada) Maxime Chaput (Canada) Adam Harris
12 min	Penalties	18 min	Referees: (Canada) Fraser Lawrence (Canada) Carter Sandlak; Linesmen: (Canada) Maxime Chaput (Canada) Adam Harris
28	Shots	32	Referees: (Canada) Fraser Lawrence (Canada) Carter Sandlak; Linesmen: (Canada) Maxime Chaput (Canada) Adam Harris

25 December 2020; 16:00	Germany	3–5 (0–2, 2–3, 1–0)	Finland	Rogers Place, Edmonton; Attendance: 0

Game reference

Arno Tiefensee
Goalies
Kari Piiroinen
Referees:
(Canada) Kyle Kowalski
(Canada) Tyson Stewart
Linesmen:
(Canada) Brett Mackey
(Canada) Matthew Mannella

	0–1	03:38 – Lundell (Hatakka, Hirvonen)
	0–2	19:48 – Räty (Nikkanen, Heinola)
	0–3	21:39 – Pyyhtiä (Kokkonen, Räty)
Dubé (Volek) (PP) – 25:34	1–3
Stützle (Peterka, Elias) – 30:35	2–3
	2–4	31:53 – Niemelä (Simontaival)
	2–5	33:51 – Nikkanen (Pärssinen, Niemelä) (PP)
Elias (Stützle) – 48:13	3–5

6 min
Penalties
14 min
22
Shots
50

26 December 2020; 16:00	Germany	2–16 (1–4, 0–7, 1–5)	Canada	Rogers Place, Edmonton; Attendance: 0

Game reference

Arno Tiefensee
Jonas Gahr
Goalies
Devon Levi
Dylan Garand
Referees:
(Canada) Adam Bloski
(Canada) Mark Pearce
Linesmen:
(Canada) Guillaume Brunelle
(Canada) Kelsey Mahoney

	0–1	01:54 – Guhle (Quinn, Barron)
	0–2	07:27 – Mercer (SH)
Peterka (Elias, Alberg) (PP) – 13:12	1–2
	1–3	14:20 – Tomasino
	1–4	19:58 – Krebs (Cozens, McMichael) (PP)
	1–5	22:40 – Mercer (Tomasino, Drysdale)
	1–6	25:36 – Suzuki (Mercer)
	1–7	26:40 – Newhook (Cozens)
	1–8	30:59 – Newhook (Cozens)
	1–9	33:01 – Tomasino (Barron, Mercer)
	1–10	38:14 – Cozens
	1–11	39:51 – Krebs (Byram, Perfetti)
	1–12	40:37 – Cozens (McMichael, Perfetti) (PP)
	1–13	44:33 – Cozens (Newhook, Holloway)
	1–14	45:02 – Pelletier (Byram, Byfield)
	1–15	46:24 – Harley (Perfetti, Krebs)
	1–16	46:38 – McMichael (SH)
Elias (Peterka, Gnyp) (PP) – 59:42	2–16

8 min
Penalties
33 min
15
Shots
44

27 December 2020; 12:00	Finland	4–1 (1–1, 1–0, 2–0)	Switzerland	Rogers Place, Edmonton; Attendance: 0

Game reference

Roope Taponen
Goalies
Thibault Fatton
Referees:
(Canada) Alendre Garon
(Canada) Kevin Maille
Linesmen:
(Canada) Adam Harris
(Canada) Ben O'Quinn

	0–1	03:44 – Biasca (Fust, Allenspach) (PP)
Lundell (Simontaival) – 04:20	1–1
Pärssinen (Niemelä, Lambert) (PP) – 24:35	2–1
Räty (Lambert, Niemelä) (PP) – 50:41	3–1
Simontaival (Hirvonen, Lundell) (PP) – 56:49	4–1

12 min
Penalties
10 min
43
Shots
14

27 December 2020; 16:00	Slovakia	1–3 (0–1, 0–0, 1–2)	Canada	Rogers Place, Edmonton; Attendance: 0

Game reference

Samuel Hlavaj
Goalies
Devon Levi
Referees:
(Canada) Mike Langin
(Canada) Tyson Stewart
Linesmen:
(Canada) Jonathan Deschamps
(Canada) Matthew Mannella

	0–1	04:08 – Spence (Tomasino, Mercer)
	0–2	56:25 – Tomasino (Cozens)
Chromiak (Faith, Nemec) (PP, EA) – 58:36	1–2
	1–3	59:47 – Quinn (ENG)

4 min
Penalties
6 min
18
Shots
23

28 December 2020; 19:30	Slovakia	3–4 OT (1–1, 2–2, 0–0) (OT: 0–1)	Germany	Rogers Place, Edmonton; Attendance: 0

Game reference

Simon Latkoczy
Goalies
Florian Bugl
Referees:
(Canada) Mathieu Menniti
(Canada) Brett Roeland
Linesmen:
(Canada) Brett Mackey
(Canada) Tarrington Wyonzek

	0–1	05:39 – Stützle (Elias, Gnyp)
Mrázik (Golian) (SH) – 10:07	1–1
Myklukha (Kolenič, Eliaš) – 23:10	2–1
	2–2	28:13 – Stützle (Gnyp, Bugl) (PP)
Mrázik (Nemec, Jellúš) (PP) – 34:41	3–2
	3–3	39:14 – Elias (Gnyp, Peterka) (PP)
	3–4	64:01 – Zimmermann (Peterka, Stützle) (PP)

14 min
Penalties
6 min
25
Shots
32

29 December 2020; 16:00	Canada	10–0 (1–0, 4–0, 5–0)	Switzerland	Rogers Place, Edmonton; Attendance: 0

Game reference

Devon Levi
Goalies
Noah Patenaude
Referees:
(Canada) Alexandre Garon
(Canada) Fraser Lawrence
Linesmen:
(Canada) Brett Mackey
(Canada) Nathan Vanoosten

Tomasino (Byfield, Quinn) – 01:30	1–0
Cozens (Perfetti, McMichael) (PP) – 21:40	2–0
Pelletier (Zary, Byfield) – 28:02	3–0
Suzuki (Byfield, Newhook) (PP) – 33:44	4–0
McMichael (Cozens) – 37:53	5–0
Byfield (Drysdale, Suzuki) (PP) – 45:16	6–0
Byfield (Quinn, Pelletier) – 48:07	7–0
Perfetti (Krebs, Newhook) – 49:09	8–0
Guhle (Korczak, Krebs) – 53:28	9–0
Pelletier (Byfield) – 55:35	10–0

12 min
Penalties
22 min
52
Shots
15

30 December 2020; 12:00	Finland	6–0 (1–0, 2–0, 3–0)	Slovakia	Rogers Place, Edmonton; Attendance: 0

Game reference

Kari Piiroinen
Goalies
Samuel Hlavaj
Referees:
(Canada) Adam Bloski
(Canada) Kevin Maille
Linesmen:
(Canada) Deion Foster
(Canada) Michael McGowan

Lundell (Simontaival, Hirvonen – 08:57	1–0
Niemelä (Lundell) (EA) – 26:09	2–0
Simontaival (Lundell, Niemelä) – 28:35	3–0
Hatakka (Hirvonen) – 46:10	4–0
Helenius (Korhonen, Petman) – 47:27	5–0
Helenius (Korhonen) – 53:49	6–0

6 min
Penalties
10 min
50
Shots
12

30 December 2020; 16:00	Switzerland	4–5 (0–3, 0–1, 4–1)	Germany	Rogers Place, Edmonton; Attendance: 0

Game reference

Thibault Fatton
Goalies
Florian Bugl
Referees:
(Canada) Guillaume Labonte
(Canada) Mark Pearce
Linesmen:
(Canada) Guillaume Brunelle
(Canada) Maxime Chaput

	0–1	04:38 – Peterka (Stützle, Elias)
	0–2	09:08 – Stützle (Elias, Peterka)
	0–3	17:16 – Peterka (Stützle, Alberg) (PP2)
	0–4	33:19 – Stützle (Peterka) (PP)
Delemont (Allenspach, Canonica) – 49:59	1–4
Daehler – 50:55	2–4
	2–5	57:39 – Peterka (Stützle) (ENG)
Meier (Allenspach) (PP, EA) – 58:14	3–5
Knak (Meier, Baragano) (PP, EA) – 59:36	4–5

16 min
Penalties
37 min
35
Shots
25

31 December 2020; 16:00	Canada	4–1 (1–0, 2–0, 1–1)	Finland	Rogers Place, Edmonton; Attendance: 0

Game reference

Devon Levi
Goalies
Kari Piiroinen
Referees:
(Canada) Michael Campbell
(Canada) Mike Langin
Linesmen:
(Canada) Jonathan Deschamps
(Canada) Ben O'Quinn

Cozens – 03:49	1–0
Holloway (Pelletier, Schneider) – 26:54	2–0
Krebs (Byram, Zary) – 32:58	3–0
	3–1	45:05 – Lambert (Niemelä, Pärssinen) (PP)
Cozens (ENG) – 58:43	4–1

2 min
Penalties
10 min
40
Shots
19

==== Group B ====
Pos	Team	Pld	W	OTW	OTL	L	GF	GA	GD	Pts	Qualification
1	United States	4	3	0	0	1	25	5	+20	9	Quarterfinals
2	Russia	4	2	1	0	1	16	9	+7	8	Quarterfinals
3	Sweden	4	2	0	1	1	14	9	+5	7	Quarterfinals
4	Czech Republic	4	2	0	0	2	10	14	−4	6	Quarterfinals
5	Austria	4	0	0	0	4	1	29	−28	0	

Source: IIHF

25 December 2020; 19:30	Russia	5–3 (1–1, 3–0, 1–2)	United States	Rogers Place, Edmonton; Attendance: 0

Game reference

Yaroslav Askarov
Goalies
Spencer Knight
Dustin Wolf
Referees:
(Canada) Olivier Gouin
(Canada) Brett Roeland
Linesmen:
(Canada) Ben O'Quinn
(Canada) Nathan Vanoosten

Ponomaryov (Knyazev, Kirsanov) – 08:07	1–0
	1–1	14:01 – York (Caufield, Boldy)
Bardakov (Groshev) – 23:12	2–1
Ponomaryov – 31:08	3–1
Safonov – 32:15	4–1
	4–2	49:57 – Farinacci (Helleson, Brink)
	4–3	57:42 – Zegras (York) (PP, EA)
Chinakhov (Amirov, Khusnutdinov) (ENG) – 59:39	5–3

8 min
Penalties
2 min
24
Shots
26

26 December 2020; 12:00	Sweden	7–1 (1–1, 3–0, 3–0)	Czech Republic	Rogers Place, Edmonton; Attendance: 0

Game reference

Hugo Alnefelt
Goalies
Nick Malík
Referees:
(Canada) Michael Campbell
(Canada) Guillaume Labonté
Linesmen:
(Canada) Jonathan Deschamps
(Canada) Tarrington Wyonzek

	0–1	10:14 – Myšák (Pytlík, Teplý)
Costmar (Söderström, Johansson) – 10:46	1–1
Sundsvik (Holmström, Broberg) (PP) – 29:08	2–1
Heineman (Broberg, Björnfot) (SH) – 31:55	3–1
Niederbach (Broberg, Söderblom) – 36:05	4–1
Söderblom (Raymond, Söderström) (PP) – 45:04	5–1
Bjerselius (Björnfot, Nybeck) – 52:22	6–1
Gunler (Söderström, Holmström) (PP) – 57:37	7–1

10 min
Penalties
12 min
41
Shots
25

26 December 2020; 19:30	United States	11–0 (1–0, 6–0, 4–0)	Austria	Rogers Place, Edmonton; Attendance: 0

Game reference

Dustin Wolf
Goalies
Sebastian Wraneschitz
Jakob Brandner
Referees:
(Canada) Mike Langin
(Canada) Mathieu Menniti
Linesmen:
(Canada) Deion Foster
(Canada) Michael McGowan

Helleson (Turcotte, Zegras) – 15:31	1–0
Zegras (Turcotte, Kaliyev) – 24:35	2–0
Farinacci (Johnson, Berard) – 25:03	3–0
Brisson (Sanderson) (PP) – 28:05	4–0
Zegras (Turcotte) – 31:59	5–0
Boldy (Beniers, Faber) – 34:15	6–0
Boldy (Kaliyev, York) (PP) – 38:24	7–0
Berard (Farinacci) – 42:25	8–0
Brisson (Kleven, Moynihan) – 43:07	9–0
Boldy (Zegras, Moynihan) – 45:52	10–0
Colangelo (Faber, Berard) – 49:45	11–0

4 min
Penalties
29 min
73
Shots
10

27 December 2020; 19:30	Czech Republic	2–0 (0–0, 1–0, 1–0)	Russia	Rogers Place, Edmonton; Attendance: 0

Game reference
Lukáš Pařík	Goalies	Yaroslav Askarov	Referees: (Canada) Olivier Gouin (Canada) Kyle Kowalski; Linesmen: (Canada) Maxime Chaput (Canada) Kelsey Mahoney
Koffer (Rychlovský) – 36:38 / 1–0; Lang – 45:07 / 2–0			Referees: (Canada) Olivier Gouin (Canada) Kyle Kowalski; Linesmen: (Canada) Maxime Chaput (Canada) Kelsey Mahoney
20 min	Penalties	4 min	Referees: (Canada) Olivier Gouin (Canada) Kyle Kowalski; Linesmen: (Canada) Maxime Chaput (Canada) Kelsey Mahoney
29	Shots	30	Referees: (Canada) Olivier Gouin (Canada) Kyle Kowalski; Linesmen: (Canada) Maxime Chaput (Canada) Kelsey Mahoney

28 December 2020; 16:00	Austria	0–4 (0–1, 0–2, 0–1)	Sweden	Rogers Place, Edmonton; Attendance: 0

Game reference

Sebastian Wraneschitz
Goalies
Hugo Alnefelt
Referees:
(Canada) Guillaume Labonte
(Canada) Kevin Maille
Linesmen:
(Canada) Guillaume Brunelle
(Canada) Michael McGowan

0–1	17:45 – Gunler (Johansson, Holmström) (PP)
0–2	24:36 – Niederbach (Söderström, Raymond) (PP)
0–3	30:57 – Gunler (Holmström, Berglund)
0–4	52:37 – Raymond (Holtz, Sundsvik)

8 min
Penalties
0 min
6
Shots
65

29 December 2020; 12:00	United States	7–0 (0–0, 3–0, 4–0)	Czech Republic	Rogers Place, Edmonton; Attendance: 0

Game reference

Spencer Knight
Goalies
Lukáš Pařík
Nick Malik
Referees:
(Canada) Michael Campbell
(Canada) Carter Sandlak
Linesmen:
(Canada) Matthew Mannella
(Canada) Ben O'Quinn

Brink (Berard) – 25:33	1–0
Zegras (Thrun) – 33:30	2–0
Brink (Beniers, Johnson) – 35:56	3–0
Zegras (Faber, York) (EA) – 46:03	4–0
Kaliyev (York, Zegras) (PP) – 48:18	5–0
Caufield (Zegras, York) (PP) – 50:22	6–0
Boldy (Zegras, Caufield) (PP) – 51:22	7–0

4 min
Penalties
24 min
32
Shots
22

29 December 2020; 19:30	Austria	1–7 (0–4, 1–0, 0–3)	Russia	Rogers Place, Edmonton; Attendance: 0

Game reference

Jakob Brandner
Goalies
Artur Akhtyamov
Referees:
(Canada) Adam Bloski
(Canada) Mark Pearce
Linesmen:
(Canada) Jonathan Deschamps
(Canada) Deion Foster

	0–1	04:40 – Amirov (PS)
	0–2	06:11 – Podkolzin (Bychkov, Chistyakov)
	0–3	13:44 – Podkolzin (Knyazev, Amirov)
	0–4	16:19 – Khusnutdinov (Podkolzin, Bychkov)
Peeters (Kasper) – 27:38	1–4
	1–5	41:46 – Knyazev (Afanasyev, Khusnutdinov) (PP)
	1–6	57:44 – Afanasyev (Abramov, Gritsyuk)
	1–7	58:29 – Gritsyuk (Afanasyev, Bychkov)

4 min
Penalties
14 min
18
Shots
50

30 December 2020; 19:30	Russia	4–3 OT (2–1, 0–1, 1–1) (OT: 1–0)	Sweden	Rogers Place, Edmonton; Attendance: 0

Game reference

Yaroslav Askarov
Goalies
Jesper Wallstedt
Referees:
(Canada) Brett Roeland
(Canada) Carter Sandlak
Linesmen:
(Canada) Adam Harris
(Canada) Tarrington Wyonzek

Afanasyev (Abramov, Gritsyuk) – 07:28	1–0
	1–1	14:33 – Costmar (Gunler, Holmström)
Amirov (Podkolzin, Khusnutdinov) (PP) – 19:14	2–1
	2–2	35:59 – Holtz (Sundsvik, Andrae)
Kirsanov (Knyazev, Amirov) (PP) – 49:46	3–2
	3–3	59:00 – Gunler (Holtz, Söderström) (EA)
Khusnutdinov (Amirov, Chistyakov) (PP) – 64:54	4–3

10 min
Penalties
8 min
35
Shots
36

31 December 2020; 12:00	Czech Republic	7–0 (0–0, 3–0, 4–0)	Austria	Rogers Place, Edmonton; Attendance: 0

Game reference

Nick Malik
Goalies
Sebastian Wraneschitz
Referees:
(Canada) Alexandre Garon
(Canada) Kyle Kowalski
Linesmen:
(Canada) Deion Foster
(Canada) Michael McGowan

Kubíček (Vitouch, Novák) – 26:21	1–0
Lang (Haš, Svozil) – 32:05	2–0
Lang (Myšák, Kubíček) – 38:11	3–0
Přikryl (Mužík, Beránek) – 39:27	4–0
Novák (Raška, Jiříček) – 41:39	5–0
Jiříček (Vitouch, Novák) – 56:45	6–0
Myšák (Lang, Teplý) – 59:34	7–0

0 min
Penalties
2 min
61
Shots
15

31 December 2020; 19:30	Sweden	0–4 (0–2, 0–2, 0–0)	United States	Rogers Place, Edmonton; Attendance: 0

Game reference

Hugo Alnefelt
Goalies
Spencer Knight
Referees:
(Canada) Olivier Gouin
(Canada) Tyson Stewart
Linesmen:
(Canada) Kelsey Mahoney
(Canada) Nathan Vanoosten

0–1	01:09 – Helleson (Farinacci, Brink)
0–2	03:58 – Zegras (Faber)
0–3	22:00 – Johnson (Zegras, Turcotte)
0–4	23:55 – Turcotte (Kaliyev, Zegras)

4 min
Penalties
2 min
27
Shots
37

=== Playoff round ===
Winning teams will be reseeded for the semi-finals in accordance with the following ranking:

1. higher position in the group
2. higher number of points
3. better goal difference
4. higher number of goals scored for
5. better seeding coming into the tournament (final placement at the 2020 World Junior Ice Hockey Championships).

Rank	Team	Group	Pos	Pts	GD	GF	Seed
1	Canada	A	1	12	+29	33	1
2	United States	B	1	9	+20	25	6
3	Finland	A	2	9	+8	16	4
4	Russia	B	2	8	+7	16	2
5	Sweden	B	3	7	+5	14	3
6	Germany	A	3	5	−14	14	9
7	Czech Republic	B	4	6	–4	10	7
8	Slovakia	A	4	4	–8	5	8

==== Bracket ====
Quarterfinals
2 January – Rogers Place
2B Russia	2
3A Germany	1
2 January – Rogers Place
2A Finland	3
3B Sweden	2
2 January – Rogers Place
1A Canada	3
4B Czech Republic	0
2 January – Rogers Place
1B United States	5
4A Slovakia	2

Semifinals
4 January – Rogers Place
1 Canada	5
4 Russia	0
4 January – Rogers Place
2 United States	4
3 Finland	3

Final
5 January – Rogers Place
1 Canada	0
2 United States	2
Third place
5 January – Rogers Place
3 Finland	4
4 Russia	1

==== Quarterfinals ====
2 January 2021; 10:00	Russia	2–1 (1–0, 1–0, 0–1)	Germany	Rogers Place, Edmonton; Attendance: 0

Game reference

Yaroslav Askarov
Goalies
Florian Bugl
Referees:
(Canada) Kyle Kowalski
(Canada) Mathieu Menniti
Linesmen:
(Canada) Adam Harris
(Canada) Brett Mackey

Ponomaryov (Chistyakov, Bardakov) (SH) – 09:06	1–0
Bashkirov (Afanasyev, Gritsyuk) – 28:27	2–0
	2–1	43:24 – Elias

10 min
Penalties
4 min
27
Shots
19

2 January 2021; 13:30	Finland	3–2 (0–2, 1–0, 2–0)	Sweden	Rogers Place, Edmonton; Attendance: 0

Game reference

Kari Piiroinen
Goalies
Hugo Alnefelt
Referees:
(Canada) Olivier Gouin
(Canada) Mike Langin
Linesmen:
(Canada) Matthew Mannella
(Canada) Ben O'Quinn

	0–1	14:28 – Raymond (Johansson)
	0–2	16:05 – Söderblom (Raymond) (PP)
Nikkanen (Viro, Lambert) – 25:32	1–2
Lundell (Heinola) (PP) – 51:04	2–2
Hirvonen (Petman) – 59:35	3–2

20 min
Penalties
16 min
31
Shots
24

2 January 2021; 17:00	Canada	3–0 (2–0, 0–0, 1–0)	Czech Republic	Rogers Place, Edmonton; Attendance: 0

Game reference

Devon Levi
Goalies
Nick Malik
Referees:
(Canada) Fraser Lawrence
(Canada) Tyson Stewart
Linesmen:
(Canada) Maxime Chaput
(Canada) Kelsey Mahoney

Cozens (McMichael) – 08:22	1–0
Byram (Krebs, Cozens) – 11:39	2–0
McMichael (Guhle, Krebs) (ENG) – 57:11	3–0

2 min
Penalties
2 min
25
Shots
29

2 January 2021; 20:30	United States	5–2 (1–0, 2–1, 2–1)	Slovakia	Rogers Place, Edmonton; Attendance: 0

Game reference

Spencer Knight
Goalies
Simon Latkoczy
Referees:
(Canada) Guillaume Labonte
(Canada) Mark Pearce
Linesmen:
(Canada) Guillaume Brunelle
(Canada) Tarrington Wyonzek

Kaliyev (Boldy, Zegras) (PP) – 10:44	1–0
Farinacci (Johnson, Berard) – 31:55	2–0
Caufield (Zegras) (PP2) – 36:53	3–0
	3–1	38:32 – Kašlík (Nemec, Kolenič)
	3–2	49:50 – Sojka (Kňažko) (PP)
Farinacci (Brink) – 55:46	4–2
Beniers (Brink) (ENG) – 58:36	5–2

18 min
Penalties
10 min
43
Shots
18

==== Semifinals ====
4 January 2021; 16:00	Canada	5–0 (3–0, 1–0, 1–0)	Russia	Rogers Place, Edmonton; Attendance: 0

Game reference

Devon Levi
Goalies
Yaroslav Askarov
Referees:
(Canada) Olivier Gouin
(Canada) Brett Roeland
Linesmen:
(Canada) Jonathan Deschamps
(Canada) Ben O'Quinn

Newhook (Schneider, Quinn) – 00:59	1–0
McMichael (Pelletier, Cozens) – 10:33	2–0
Perfetti (Byram, Cozens) (PP) – 15:05	3–0
Schneider (Suzuki, Mercer) – 24:09	4–0
Cozens (Pelletier) (ENG) – 58:31	5-0

4 min
Penalties
8 min
35
Shots
28

4 January 2021; 19:30	United States	4–3 (1–1, 2–0, 1–2)	Finland	Rogers Place, Edmonton; Attendance: 0

Game reference

Spencer Knight
Goalies
Kari Piiroinen
Referees:
(Canada) Michael Campbell
(Canada) Carter Sandlak
Linesmen:
(Canada) Nathan Vanoosten
(Canada) Tarrington Wynozek

Turcotte (Kaliyev, Faber) – 12:39	1–0
	1–1	14:06 – Simontaival (Puutio, Heinola) (PP)
Farinacci (Lacombe) – 35:53	2–1
Boldy (Zegras, Caufield) (PP) – 37:00	3–1
	3–2	51:38 – Simontaival (Puutio, Helenius)
	3–3	56:17 – Hirvonen (Lundell, Heinola) (PP)
Kaliyev (Turcotte, Sanderson) – 58:44	4–3

10 min
Penalties
4 min
26
Shots
36

==== Bronze medal game ====
5 January 2021; 15:30	Finland	4–1 (0–1, 1–0, 3–0)	Russia	Rogers Place, Edmonton; Attendance: 0

Game reference

Kari Piiroinen
Goalies
Yaroslav Askarov
Referees:
(Canada) Michael Campbell
(Canada) Kyle Kowalski
Linesmen:
(Canada) Maxime Chaput
(Canada) Ben O'Quinn

	0–1	06:03 – Safonov (Groshev)
Lundell (Niemelä, Mäntykivi) – 25:05	1–1
Petman (Viro, Helenius) – 41:13	2–1
Lundell (ENG) – 58:32	3–1
Pärssinen (Pyyhtiä) (ENG) – 59:47	4–1

4 min
Penalties
6 min
32
Shots
29

==== Gold medal match ====
5 January 2021; 19:30	Canada	0–2 (0–1, 0–1, 0–0)	United States	Rogers Place, Edmonton; Attendance: 0

Game reference
Devon Levi	Goalies	Spencer Knight	Referees: (Canada) Olivier Gouin (Canada) Carter Sandlak; Linesmen: (Canada) Jonathan Deschamps (Canada) Nathan Vanoosten
0–1 / 13:25 – Turcotte (Helleson, Zegras); 0–2 / 20:32 – Zegras (Kaliyev)			Referees: (Canada) Olivier Gouin (Canada) Carter Sandlak; Linesmen: (Canada) Jonathan Deschamps (Canada) Nathan Vanoosten
2 min	Penalties	2 min	Referees: (Canada) Olivier Gouin (Canada) Carter Sandlak; Linesmen: (Canada) Jonathan Deschamps (Canada) Nathan Vanoosten
34	Shots	21	Referees: (Canada) Olivier Gouin (Canada) Carter Sandlak; Linesmen: (Canada) Jonathan Deschamps (Canada) Nathan Vanoosten

=== Statistics ===
==== Scoring leaders ====
Pos	Player	Country	GP	G	A	Pts	+/−	PIM
1	Trevor Zegras	United States	7	7	11	18	+9	0
2	Dylan Cozens	Canada	7	8	8	16	+11	6
3	Anton Lundell	Finland	7	6	4	10	+7	4
4	Tim Stützle	Germany	5	5	5	10	−4	8
5	John-Jason Peterka	Germany	5	4	6	10	–5	2
6	Florian Elias	Germany	5	4	5	9	−2	4
7	Connor McMichael	Canada	7	4	4	8	+8	4
8	Arthur Kaliyev	United States	7	3	5	8	+9	4
8	Peyton Krebs	Canada	7	3	5	8	+8	4
8	Alex Turcotte	United States	7	3	5	8	+8	2

GP = Games played; G = Goals; A = Assists; Pts = Points; +/− = Plus–minus; PIM = Penalties In Minutes
Source: IIHF

==== Goaltending leaders ====
(minimum 40% team's total ice time)

Pos	Player	Country	TOI	GA	GAA	SA	Sv%	SO
1	Devon Levi	Canada	398:07	5	0.75	139	96.40	3
2	Spencer Knight	United States	332:15	9	1.63	149	93.96	3
3	Simon Latkoczy	Slovakia	183:54	8	2.61	102	92.16	1
4	Kari Piiroinen	Finland	357:57	13	2.18	152	91.45	1
5	Yaroslav Askarov	Russia	360:11	15	2.50	174	91.38	0

TOI = Time on ice (minutes:seconds); GA = Goals against; GAA = Goals against average; SA = Shots against; Sv% = Save percentage; SO = Shutouts
Source: IIHF

=== Awards ===
- Best players selected by the directorate:
  - Best Goaltender: (Canada) Devon Levi
  - Best Defenceman: (Finland) Topi Niemelä
  - Best Forward: (Germany) Tim Stützle

Source: IIHF

- Media All-Stars:
  - MVP: (United States) Trevor Zegras
  - Goaltender: (Canada) Devon Levi
  - Defencemen: (Canada) Bowen Byram / (Finland) Ville Heinola
  - Forwards: (United States) Trevor Zegras / (Canada) Dylan Cozens / (Germany) Tim Stützle

Source: IIHF

=== Final standings ===
Pos	Grp	Team	Pld	W	OTW	OTL	L	GF	GA	GD	Pts	Final result
1	B	United States	7	6	0	0	1	36	10	+26	18	Champions
2	A	Canada (H)	7	6	0	0	1	41	6	+35	18	Runners-up
3	A	Finland	7	5	0	0	2	26	15	+11	15	Third place
4	B	Russia	7	3	1	0	3	19	19	0	11	Fourth place
5	B	Sweden	5	2	0	1	2	16	12	+4	7	Eliminated in Quarterfinals
6	A	Germany	5	1	1	0	3	15	30	−15	5	Eliminated in Quarterfinals
7	B	Czech Republic	5	2	0	0	3	10	17	−7	6	Eliminated in Quarterfinals
8	A	Slovakia	5	1	0	1	3	7	18	−11	4	Eliminated in Quarterfinals
9	A	Switzerland	4	0	0	0	4	5	20	−15	0	Eliminated in Preliminary round
10	B	Austria	4	0	0	0	4	1	29	−28	0	Eliminated in Preliminary round

Source: IIHF
(H) Host

== Division I ==
Division I, II, and III tournaments were cancelled.

=== Group A ===
The tournament would have been held in Hørsholm, Denmark, from December 13 to 19, 2020.

- Belarus
- Denmark
- Hungary – Promoted from Division I B
- Kazakhstan – Relegated from Top Division
- Latvia
- Norway

=== Group B ===
The tournament would have been held in Tallinn, Estonia, from February 10 to 17, 2021.

- Estonia
- France
- Japan – Promoted from Division II A
- Poland
- Slovenia – Relegated from Division I A
- Ukraine

== Division II ==
Division I, II, and III tournaments were cancelled.

=== Group A ===
The tournament would have been held in Brașov, Romania, from February 8 to 14, 2021.

- Great Britain
- Italy – Relegated from Division I B
- Lithuania
- Romania
- South Korea – Promoted from Division II B
- Spain

=== Group B ===
The tournament would have been held in Belgrade, Serbia, from February 8 to 14, 2021.

- Belgium
- China
- Croatia
- Iceland – Promoted from Division III
- Netherlands
- Serbia – Relegated from Division II A

== Division III ==
The tournament would have been held in Mexico City, Mexico, from January 10 to 17, 2021, but was cancelled.

- Bulgaria
- Chinese Taipei
- Israel – Relegated from Division II B
- Mexico
- South Africa
- Turkey
