= Arvid Costmar =

Swedish professional ice hockey centre

- Born: 7 July 2001 (age 24) Motala, Sweden
- Height: 5 ft 11 in (180 cm)
- Weight: 181 lb (82 kg; 12 st 13 lb)
- Position: Centre
- Shoots: Right
- SHL team Former teams: Djurgårdens IF; Linköping HC
- NHL draft: 215th overall, 2019; Vancouver Canucks
- Playing career: 2018–present

Arvid Costmar (born 7 July 2001) is a Swedish professional ice hockey centre currently playing for Djurgårdens IF of the Swedish Hockey League (SHL).

== Playing career ==
Costmar was drafted 215th overall by the Vancouver Canucks in the 2019 NHL entry draft. Costmar made his Swedish Hockey League debut with Linköping HC during the 2018–19 SHL season, appearing in 4 regular season games.

Following his sixth SHL season with Linköping in 2023–24, and after a brief initial loan stint, Costmar opted to sign a one-year contract on a permanent basis with Djurgårdens IF on 29 April 2024.

== Career statistics ==
=== Regular season and playoffs ===
			Regular season					Playoffs
Season	Team	League	GP	G	A	Pts	PIM	GP	G	A	Pts	PIM
2015–16	Linköpings HC	J18	4	0	1	1	0	—	—	—	—	—
2016–17	Linköpings HC	J18	16	6	10	16	12	—	—	—	—	—
2016–17	Linköpings HC	J20	1	1	0	1	0	1	0	0	0	0
2017–18	Linköpings HC	J18	6	4	4	8	4	—	—	—	—	—
2017–18	Linköpings HC	J20	44	6	16	22	26	3	0	1	1	0
2018–19	Linköpings HC	J20	44	13	25	38	73	6	1	4	5	6
2018–19	Linköpings HC	SHL	4	0	0	0	0	—	—	—	—	—
2019–20	Linköping HC	J20	29	26	24	50	59	—	—	—	—	—
2019–20	Linköping HC	SHL	8	1	0	1	0	—	—	—	—	—
2019–20	Mora IK	Allsv	6	0	0	0	2	—	—	—	—	—
2020–21	Linköping HC	J20	3	1	5	6	4	—	—	—	—	—
2020–21	Linköping HC	SHL	22	1	0	1	6	—	—	—	—	—
2021–22	Linköping HC	SHL	48	3	4	7	16	—	—	—	—	—
2022–23	Linköping HC	SHL	52	2	7	9	24	—	—	—	—	—
2023–24	Linköping HC	SHL	40	5	5	10	8	4	0	0	0	4
2023–24	Djurgårdens IF	Allsv	12	2	3	5	8	—	—	—	—	—
2024–25	Djurgårdens IF	Allsv	41	11	18	29	24	12	2	2	4	31
SHL totals			174	12	16	28	54	4	0	0	0	4

Medal record

Ice hockey

Representing Sweden

IIHF World U18 Championship
Gold medal – first place	2019 Sweden	

Hlinka Gretzky Cup
Silver medal – second place	2018 Canada	

=== International ===
Year	Team	Event	Result	GP	G	A	Pts	PIM
2017	Sweden	U17	8th	5	2	1	3	2
2018	Sweden	HG18	2nd place, silver medalist(s)	5	0	1	1	2
2019	Sweden	U18	1st place, gold medalist(s)	3	0	1	1	2
2021	Sweden	WJC	5th	5	2	0	2	2
Junior totals				18	4	3	7	8
