= Drew Helleson =

American ice hockey player (born 2001)

- Born: March 26, 2001 (age 25) Farmington, Minnesota, U.S.
- Height: 6 ft 3 in (191 cm)
- Weight: 208 lb (94 kg; 14 st 12 lb)
- Position: Defense
- Shoots: Right
- NHL team: Anaheim Ducks
- National team: United States
- NHL draft: 47th overall, 2019; Colorado Avalanche
- Playing career: 2022–present

Andrew Jacob Helleson (born March 26, 2001) is an American ice hockey player who is a defenseman for the Anaheim Ducks of the National Hockey League (NHL). Helleson was drafted 47th overall by the Colorado Avalanche in the 2019 NHL entry draft.

== Playing career ==
During the 2020–21 season, Helleson recorded four goals and 11 assists in 22 games for Boston College. Following the season he was named Hockey East Best Defensive Defenseman, First Team All-Hockey East and Second Team AHCA All-American. In his junior 2021–22 season with the Eagles, he posted career-best marks of 21 assists and 25 points through 32 games.

Helleson was drafted by the Colorado Avalanche of the National Hockey League (NHL) in the second round, 47th overall, in the 2019 NHL entry draft. Helleson's rights along with a 2023 second-round draft pick were traded by the Avalanche to the Anaheim Ducks, in exchange for defenseman Josh Manson, on March 14, 2022. The next day Helleson ended his collegiate career by signing a three-year, entry-level contract with the Ducks. He was assigned to the Ducks American Hockey League (AHL) affiliate, the San Diego Gulls for the remainder of the season. Helleson returned to the AHL for the 2022–23 season but was recalled on April 9, 2023 by the Ducks. Helleson made his NHL debut for the Ducks that night, in a game against the Colorado Avalanche. He scored his first NHL goal against Thatcher Demko of the Vancouver Canucks in a 3–2 loss on April 12.

Helleson was assigned to San Diego to begin the 2023–24 season. He appeared in 59 games for the Gulls, scoring 4 goals and 18 points. He was assigned to the Gulls at the beginning of the 2024–25 season. He was recalled along with Jansen Harkins on November 13. He made his NHL season debut on November 15, marking his first multi-point game, assisting on goals by Cutter Gauthier and Ross Johnston in a 6–4 win over the Detroit Red Wings.

As a restricted free agent, Helleson avoided arbitration after agreeing to a two-year, $2.2 million contract extension on July 19, 2025.

== International play ==
Medal record

Representing United States

Ice hockey

World Junior Championship
Gold medal – first place	2021 Canada	

World U18 Championship
Bronze medal – third place	2019 Sweden	

Helleson represented the United States at the 2019 IIHF World U18 Championships, where he recorded three assists in seven games and won a bronze medal. He represented the United States at the 2021 World Junior Ice Hockey Championships where he recorded two goals and two assists in seven games and won a gold medal. On January 13, 2022, Helleson was named to Team USA's roster to represent the United States at the 2022 Winter Olympics.

== Career statistics ==
=== Regular season and playoffs ===
			Regular season					Playoffs
Season	Team	League	GP	G	A	Pts	PIM	GP	G	A	Pts	PIM
2017–18	U.S. National Development Team	USHL	34	2	16	18	14	—	—	—	—	—
2018–19	U.S. National Development Team	USHL	28	4	7	11	18	—	—	—	—	—
2019–20	Boston College	HE	28	1	5	6	12	—	—	—	—	—
2020–21	Boston College	HE	22	4	11	15	8	—	—	—	—	—
2021–22	Boston College	HE	32	4	21	25	30	—	—	—	—	—
2021–22	San Diego Gulls	AHL	17	0	2	2	4	2	0	2	2	2
2022–23	San Diego Gulls	AHL	65	5	13	18	59	—	—	—	—	—
2022–23	Anaheim Ducks	NHL	3	1	0	1	2	—	—	—	—	—
2023–24	San Diego Gulls	AHL	59	4	14	18	44	—	—	—	—	—
2024–25	San Diego Gulls	AHL	12	0	0	0	14	—	—	—	—	—
2024–25	Anaheim Ducks	NHL	56	4	9	13	47	—	—	—	—	—
2025–26	Anaheim Ducks	NHL	60	2	13	15	20	8	0	1	1	2
NHL totals			119	7	22	29	69	8	0	1	1	2

=== International ===
Year	Team	Event	Result	GP	G	A	Pts	PIM
2019	United States	U18	3rd place, bronze medalist(s)	7	0	3	3	0
2021	United States	WJC	1st place, gold medalist(s)	7	2	2	4	2
2022	United States	OG	5th	3	0	1	1	0
Junior totals				14	2	5	7	2
Senior totals				3	0	1	1	0

== Awards and honors ==
Award	Year	Ref
College
Hockey East Best Defensive Defenseman	2021	
All Hockey East First Team	2021	
AHCA East Second Team All-American	2021	

Awards and achievements
Preceded by Wyatt Newpower	Hockey East Best Defensive Defenseman; 2020–21	Succeeded by Jordan Harris
