= Noel Gunler =

Swedish ice hockey player (born 2001)

- Born: 7 October 2001 (age 24) Luleå, Sweden
- Height: 6 ft 2 in (188 cm)
- Weight: 176 lb (80 kg; 12 st 8 lb)
- Position: Winger
- Shoots: Right
- SHL team Former teams: Djurgårdens IF; Luleå HF; Brynäs IF; Oulun Kärpät
- NHL draft: 41st overall, 2020; Carolina Hurricanes
- Playing career: 2018–present

Noel Gunler (born 7 October 2001) is a Swedish professional ice hockey winger currently playing for Djurgårdens IF of the Swedish Hockey League (SHL). Gunler was drafted 41st overall by the Carolina Hurricanes in the 2020 NHL entry draft.

== Playing career ==
Gunler played as a youth in his native Sweden with hometown club, Luleå HF. He made his Swedish Hockey League (SHL) debut with his Luleå during the 2018–19 season, collected 2 goals and 5 points through 15 games.

During the 2020–21 season, Gunler recorded 3 points through 10 games with Luleå before he transferred to fellow SHL club, Brynäs IF, on 6 November 2020.

In the 2021–22 campaign, his fourth year in the SHL, Gunler showed his offensive potential in finishing second in the team in goals and fourth in points in collecting 13 goals and 23 points in 52 regular season games. After appearing in all 3 post-season games, Gunler left Sweden and was signed to a three-year, entry-level contract with his draft club, the Carolina Hurricanes, on 30 March 2022. With his contract due to begin in the following season, Gunler immediately joined AHL affiliate, the Chicago Wolves, on a professional tryout contract.

As a pending restricted free agent, having been unable to debut with the Hurricanes, Gunler returned to his native Sweden in securing a two-year contract with Djurgårdens IF of the SHL on 22 June 2026.

== Career statistics ==
=== Regular season and playoffs ===
			Regular season					Playoffs
Season	Team	League	GP	G	A	Pts	PIM	GP	G	A	Pts	PIM
2016–17	Luleå HF	J20	1	0	0	0	0	—	—	—	—	—
2017–18	Luleå HF	J20	41	8	14	22	50	8	3	3	6	8
2018–19	Luleå HF	J20	31	27	19	46	78	3	0	3	3	2
2018–19	Luleå HF	SHL	15	2	3	5	2	—	—	—	—	—
2019–20	Luleå HF	J20	4	4	2	6	2	—	—	—	—	—
2019–20	Luleå HF	SHL	45	4	9	13	16	—	—	—	—	—
2020–21	Luleå HF	SHL	10	2	1	3	8	—	—	—	—	—
2020–21	Brynäs IF	SHL	29	7	5	12	8	—	—	—	—	—
2021–22	Brynäs IF	SHL	52	13	10	23	36	3	0	0	0	2
2021–22	Chicago Wolves	AHL	11	3	2	5	2	10	1	1	2	8
2022–23	Chicago Wolves	AHL	31	8	10	18	12	—	—	—	—	—
2023–24	Oulun Kärpät	Liiga	24	5	3	8	8	—	—	—	—	—
2024–25	Chicago Wolves	AHL	58	13	13	26	39	2	0	0	0	0
2025–26	Chicago Wolves	AHL	71	15	20	35	56	21	2	5	7	22
SHL totals			151	28	28	56	70	3	0	0	0	2

=== International ===
Year	Team	Event	Result	GP	G	A	Pts	PIM
2017	Sweden	U17	8th	5	0	0	0	6
2021	Sweden	WJC	5th	5	4	1	5	12
Junior totals				10	4	1	5	18

== Awards and honors ==
Award	Year	Ref
AHL
Calder Cup (Chicago Wolves)	2022	
