= Mikael Pyyhtiä =

Finnish ice hockey player (born 2001)

- Born: 17 December 2001 (age 24) Turku, Finland
- Height: 6 ft 0 in (183 cm)
- Weight: 166 lb (75 kg; 11 st 12 lb)
- Position: Left wing
- Shoots: Left
- NHL team (P) Cur. team: Columbus Blue Jackets; Cleveland Monsters (AHL)
- National team: Finland
- NHL draft: 114th overall, 2020; Columbus Blue Jackets
- Playing career: 2019–present

Mikael Pyyhtiä (born 17 December 2001) is a Finnish professional ice hockey player for the Cleveland Monsters of the American Hockey League (AHL) while under contract to the Columbus Blue Jackets of the National Hockey League (NHL).

== Playing career ==
Pyyhtiä was drafted by the Columbus Blue Jackets in the fourth round of the 2020 NHL entry draft and signed a three-year, entry-level contract in May 2022. He made his NHL debut on 13 April 2023 against the Pittsburgh Penguins, recording an assist.

On 13 August 2025, Pyyhtiä as a restricted free agent was re-signed to a one-year, two-way contract with the Blue Jackets for the 2025–26 season.

== Personal life ==
His younger brother Niklas is a professional footballer, his older brother Tuomas is an amateur ice hockey player and their father Tomi is a former footballer.

== Career statistics ==
=== Regular season and playoffs ===
			Regular season					Playoffs
Season	Team	League	GP	G	A	Pts	PIM	GP	G	A	Pts	PIM
2018–19	HC TPS	U20	30	7	9	16	25	—	—	—	—	—
2019–20	HC TPS	U20	42	11	30	41	8	—	—	—	—	—
2019–20	HC TPS	Liiga	2	0	1	1	0	—	—	—	—	—
2020–21	HC TPS	U20	16	9	10	19	4	—	—	—	—	—
2020–21	HC TPS	Liiga	35	3	4	7	4	13	1	4	5	4
2021–22	HC TPS	Liiga	56	21	14	35	6	18	8	5	13	8
2022–23	HC TPS	Liiga	47	7	13	20	16	3	0	2	2	0
2022–23	Cleveland Monsters	AHL	7	3	0	3	0	—	—	—	—	—
2022–23	Columbus Blue Jackets	NHL	2	0	1	1	2	—	—	—	—	—
2023–24	Cleveland Monsters	AHL	60	7	21	28	6	13	1	4	5	0
2023–24	Columbus Blue Jackets	NHL	17	0	2	2	0	—	—	—	—	—
2024–25	Columbus Blue Jackets	NHL	47	4	3	7	6	—	—	—	—	—
2024–25	Cleveland Monsters	AHL	28	3	13	16	2	6	0	1	1	0
2025–26	Cleveland Monsters	AHL	59	21	28	49	22	9	3	2	5	0
2025–26	Columbus Blue Jackets	NHL	5	1	0	1	0	—	—	—	—	—
Liiga totals			140	31	32	63	26	34	9	11	20	12
NHL totals			71	5	6	11	8	—	—	—	—	—

Medal record

Ice hockey

Representing Finland

World Junior Championships
Bronze medal – third place	2021 Canada	

=== International ===
Year	Team	Event	Result	GP	G	A	Pts	PIM
2021	Finland	WJC	3rd place, bronze medalist(s)	7	1	1	2	0
2025	Finland	WC	7th	3	0	0	0	0
Junior totals				7	1	1	2	0
Senior totals				3	0	0	0	0
