= Alpine skiing at the 2016 Winter Youth Olympics =

Alpine skiing at the II Winter Youth Olympic Games
- Venue: Hafjell, Norway
- Dates: 14–20 January
- Competitors: 115 Quota limit

Alpine skiing at the 2016 Winter Youth Olympics was held at Hafjell in Øyer Municipality in Oppland county, Norway from 14 to 20 January. The difference in the Youth Olympic program for alpine skiing compared to the Winter Olympics is that there was no downhill event for both genders, and an inclusion of a team event.

== Medal summary ==
=== Medal table ===
* Host nation (Norway)

Rank	Nation	Gold	Silver	Bronze	Total
1	Switzerland	3	1	2	6
2	United States	3	0	0	3
3	Austria	2	2	1	5
4	Germany	1	1	2	4
5	Italy	0	1	1	2
6	Canada	0	1	0	1
6	Japan	0	1	0	1
6	Russia	0	1	0	1
6	Sweden	0	1	0	1
10	Finland	0	0	1	1
10	Norway*	0	0	1	1
10	Slovenia	0	0	1	1
Totals (12 entries)		9	9	9	27

=== Events ===
==== Boys' events ====
Event	Gold		Silver		Bronze	
Boys' super-G	River Radamus; United States	1:10.62	Pietro Canzio; Italy	1:10.65	Manuel Traninger; Austria	1:11.03
Boys' giant slalom	River Radamus; United States	2:35.05	Yohei Koyama; Japan	2:36.12	Anton Grammel; Germany	2:36.54
Boys' slalom	Manuel Traninger; Austria	1:38.74	Filip Vennerström; Sweden	1:38.77	Odin Vassbotn Breivik; Norway	1:40.07
Boys' combined	River Radamus; United States	1:52.87	Manuel Traninger; Austria	1:52.94	Pietro Canzio; Italy	1:53.65

==== Girls' events ====
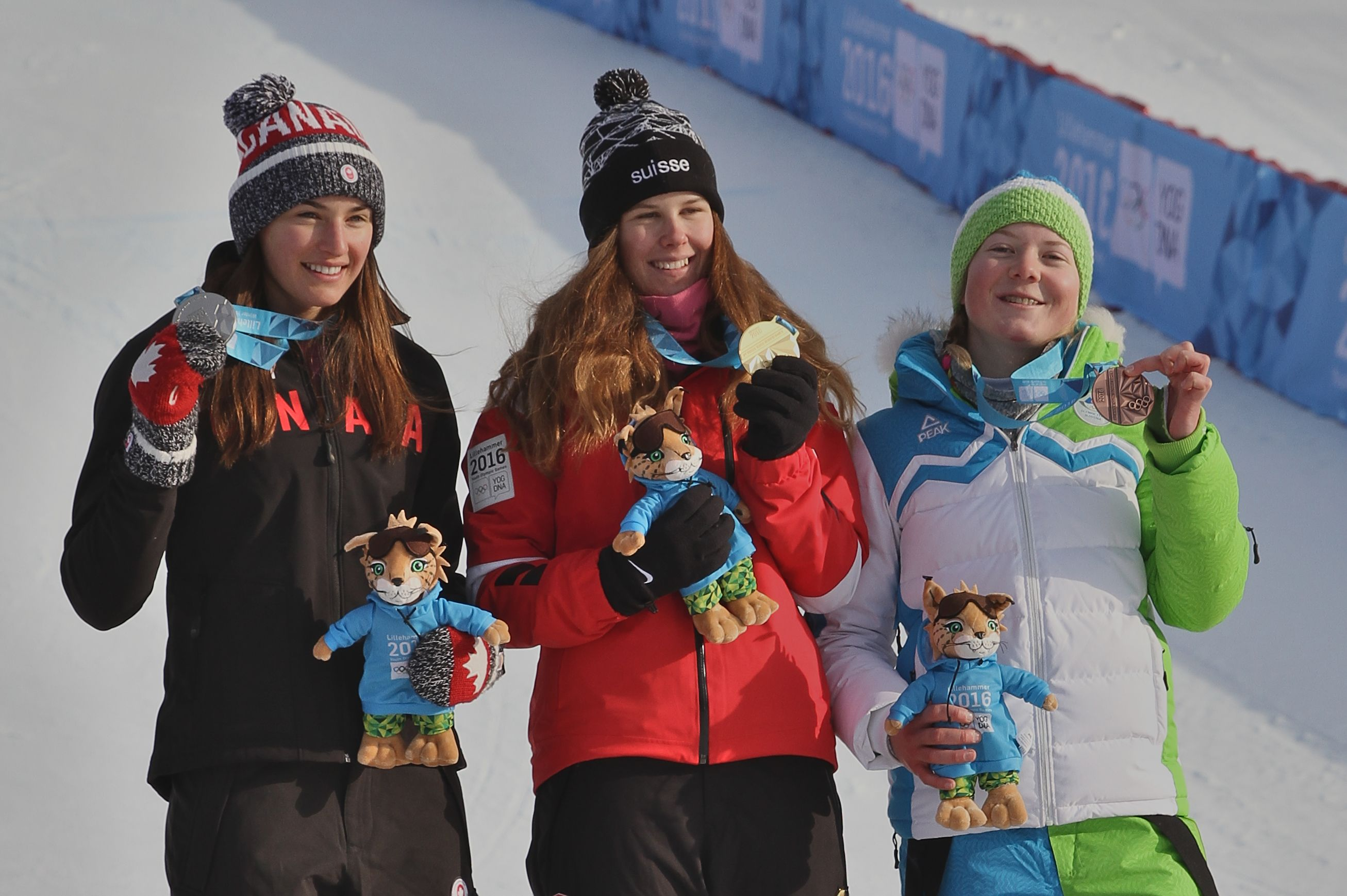
Girls slalom medalists

Event	Gold		Silver		Bronze	
Girls' super-G	Nadine Fest; Austria	1:11.93	Julia Scheib; Austria	1:12.56	Aline Danioth; Switzerland	1:12.69
Girls' giant slalom	Mélanie Meillard; Switzerland	2:33.28	Katrin Hirtl-Stanggaßinger; Germany	2:33.34	Aline Danioth; Switzerland	2:33.95
Girls' slalom	Aline Danioth; Switzerland	1:43.21	Ali Nullmeyer; Canada	1:44.80	Meta Hrovat; Slovenia	1:45.86
Girls' combined	Aline Danioth; Switzerland	1:55.74	Mélanie Meillard; Switzerland	1:56.12	Katrin Hirtl-Stanggaßinger; Germany	1:57.25

==== Mixed events ====
Event	Gold	Silver	Bronze
Parallel mixed team	Lucia Rispler; Jonas Stockinger; Germany	Anastasiia Silanteva; Aleksey Konkov; Russia	Riikka Honkanen; Sampo Kankkunen; Finland

== Qualification system ==
Each nation could send a maximum of 4 athletes (2 boys and 2 girls). A total of 115 athletes (60 boys and 55 girls) could compete, plus any reallocated spots from other disciplines under the FIS. The top 7 teams at the 2015 Junior Alpine World Ski Championships plus the hosts Norway were allowed to send the maximum of 4 athletes. Any remaining quota spots were distributed to nations not already qualified, with a maximum of one boy or girl from one nation. The quota limit was 115. The current allocation of quotas is listed below.

=== Qualification summary ===
NOC	Boys	Girls	Total
Andorra	1	1	2
Argentina	1	1	2
Australia	1	1	2
Austria	2	2	4
Belarus	1		1
Belgium	1	1	2
Bosnia and Herzegovina		1	1
Brazil	1		1
Bulgaria	1	1	2
Canada	2	2	4
Chile	1	1	2
Colombia	1		1
Croatia	1	1	2
Cyprus		1	1
Czech Republic	1	1	2
Denmark	1	1	2
Estonia		1	1
Finland	1	1	2
France	2	2	4
Georgia	1		1
Germany	2	2	4
Great Britain	1	1	2
Greece		1	1
Hungary	1	1	2
Iceland	1	1	2
India	1		1
Iran	1	1	2
Ireland	1		1
Israel	1		1
Italy	2	2	4
Japan	1	1	2
Kazakhstan		1	1
Kenya		1	1
Latvia	1	1	2
Lebanon	1	1	2
Liechtenstein	1		1
Lithuania	1	1	2
Luxembourg	1		1
Macedonia	1		1
Mexico		1	1
Monaco	1		1
Montenegro	1	1	2
Nepal	1		1
Netherlands	1	1	2
Norway	2	2	4
New Zealand	1	1	2
Poland	1	1	2
Portugal	1		1
Romania	1	1	2
Russia	1	1	2
San Marino	1		1
Serbia	1	1	2
Slovakia	1	1	2
Slovenia	2	2	4
South Africa		1	1
South Korea	1	1	2
Spain	1	1	2
Sweden	1	1	2
Switzerland	2	2	4
Chinese Taipei		1	1
Timor-Leste	1		1
Turkey	1	1	2
Ukraine	1	1	2
United States	1	1	2
Total athletes	63	57	120
Total NOCs	55	49	64
