= Alpine skiing at the 2016 Winter Youth Olympics – Girls' slalom =

Girls' slalom at the II Winter Youth Olympic Games
- Venue: Hafjell, Norway
- Date: 18 February
- Competitors: 54 from 47 nations
- Winning time: 1:43.21

Medalists
1st place, gold medalist(s)		Aline Danioth	Switzerland
2nd place, silver medalist(s)		Ali Nullmeyer	Canada
3rd place, bronze medalist(s)		Meta Hrovat	Slovenia

The girls' slalom competition of the alpine skiing events at the 2016 Winter Youth Olympics was held at the Hafjell Olympic Slope near Lillehammer, Norway, on 18 February. 54 athletes from 47 different countries took part in this event.

== Results ==
The race was started at 10:00.

Rank	Bib	Name	Country	Run 1	Rank	Run 2	Rank	Total	Difference
1st place, gold medalist(s)	7	Aline Danioth	Switzerland	53.53	1	49.68	1	1:43.21	
2nd place, silver medalist(s)	2	Ali Nullmeyer	Canada	54.78	3	50.02	2	1:44.80	+1.59
3rd place, bronze medalist(s)	1	Meta Hrovat	Slovenia	54.99	4	50.87	3	1:45.86	+2.65
4	10	Nadine Fest	Austria	54.44	2	51.74	9	1:46.18	+2.97
5	12	Carlotta Saracco	Italy	55.01	5	51.66	8	1:46.67	+3.46
6	9	Katrin Hirtl-Stanggaßinger	Germany	55.84	8	50.93	4	1:46.77	+3.56
7	11	Riikka Honkanen	Finland	55.29	6	51.49	7	1:46.78	+3.57
8	5	Lucia Rispler	Germany	55.62	7	51.21	5	1:46.83	+3.62
9	15	Kajsa Vickhoff Lie	Norway	56.45	9	51.38	6	1:47.83	+4.62
10	20	Francesca Baruzzi	Argentina	57.28	13	52.02	10	1:49.30	+6.09
11	17	Kenza Lacheb	France	56.90	10	52.59	12	1:49.49	+6.28
12	18	Kim Vanreusel	Belgium	57.27	12	52.57	11	1:49.84	+6.63
13	21	Keely Cashman	United States	57.10	11	53.58	15	1:50.68	+7.47
14	34	Tereza Jančová	Slovakia	57.74	15	53.32	14	1:51.06	+7.85
15	13	Kristiane Bekkestad	Norway	58.62	18	53.04	13	1:51.66	+8.45
16	16	Anastasiia Silanteva	Russia	58.48	17	53.65	16	1:52.13	+8.92
17	27	Živa Otoničar	Slovenia	58.86	19	53.95	18	1:52.81	+9.60
18	28	Claire Tan	Netherlands	59.10	20	54.71	20	1:53.81	+10.60
19	6	Amelia Smart	Canada	1:00.71	24	53.85	17	1:54.56	+11.35
20	31	Yasmin Cooper	Great Britain	1:00.63	23	53.98	19	1:54.61	+11.40
21	26	Mirentxu Miquel	Spain	59.81	22	54.96	21	1:54.77	+11.56
22	25	Andrea Louise Arnold	Czech Republic	1:02.76	25	57.45	22	2:00.21	+17.00
23	39	Lorita Stoimenova	Bulgaria	1:03.41	27	58.32	23	2:01.73	+18.52
24	46	Ida Sofie Bunsov Brøns	Denmark	1:03.57	28	59.53	24	2:03.10	+19.89
25	38	Magdalena Pfingsthorn	Chile	1:05.39	30	1:00.19	26	2:05.58	+22.37
26	40	Nadežda Milošević	Montenegro	1:06.84	31	59.72	25	2:06.56	+23.35
27	41	Jocelyn McGillivray	Mexico	1:07.17	32	1:00.68	27	2:07.85	+24.64
28	48	Anastasia Mantsiou	Greece	1:07.30	33	1:02.73	28	2:10.03	+26.82
29	47	Sonia Marie George	Lebanon	1:09.99	36	1:05.36	29	2:15.35	+32.14
30	52	Anna Lotta Jõgeva	Estonia	1:09.98	35	1:05.92	30	2:15.90	+32.69
31	45	Rachel Elizabeth Olivier	South Africa	1:15.00	37	1:09.12	31	2:24.12	+40.91
32	55	Andriani Pieri	Cyprus	1:15.96	38	1:10.71	32	2:26.67	+43.46
33	53	Ava Javadi	Iran	1:21.34	39	1:17.03	33	2:38.37	+55.16
34	56	Chen Wei-hsuan	Chinese Taipei	1:38.38	40	1:33.65	34	3:12.03	1:28.82
	22	Jonna Luthman	Sweden	57.69	14	DNF			
	24	Elizabeth Reid	New Zealand	58.07	16	DNF			
	30	Hong Ye-bin	South Korea	1:03.36	26	DNF			
	42	Mariia Ponomarenko	Ukraine	1:09.25	34	DNF			
	33	Elvedina Muzaferija	Bosnia and Herzegovina	59.13	21	DNS			
	43	Milica Kovačević	Serbia	1:03.81	29	DSQ			
	3	Mélanie Meillard	Switzerland	DNF					
	4	Chisaki Maeda	Japan	DNF					
	8	Sofia Pizzato	Italy	DNF					
	19	Daria Krajewska	Poland	DNF					
	23	Kathryn Parker	Australia	DNF					
	32	Camille Cerutti	France	DNF					
	35	Sabrina Simader	Kenya	DNF					
	36	Hólmfríður Dóra Friðgeirsdóttir	Iceland	DNF					
	37	Chiara Archam	Hungary	DNF					
	44	Eglė Augustaitytė	Lithuania	DNF					
	49	Yekaterina Karpova	Kazakhstan	DNF					
	50	Selin Açıkgöz	Turkey	DNF					
	51	Iulia Boier	Romania	DNF					
	29	Lana Zbašnik	Croatia	DSQ					
	14	Julia Scheib	Austria	DNS					
	54	Joana Lopes	Portugal	DNS					
