= Alpine skiing at the 2016 Winter Youth Olympics – Girls' giant slalom =

Girls' giant slalom at the II Winter Youth Olympic Games
- Venue: Hafjell, Norway
- Date: 16 February
- Competitors: 55 from 47 nations
- Winning time: 2:33.28

Medalists
1st place, gold medalist(s)		Mélanie Meillard	Switzerland
2nd place, silver medalist(s)		Katrin Hirtl-Stanggaßinger	Germany
3rd place, bronze medalist(s)		Aline Danioth	Switzerland

The girls' giant slalom competition of the alpine skiing events at the 2016 Winter Youth Olympics was held at the Hafjell Olympic Slope near Lillehammer, Norway, on 16 February. 55 athletes from 47 different countries took part in this event.

== Results ==
The race was started at 10:00.

Rank	Bib	Name	Country	Run 1	Rank	Run 2	Rank	Total	Difference
1st place, gold medalist(s)	2	Mélanie Meillard	Switzerland	1:17.84	2	1:15.44	2	2:33.28	
2nd place, silver medalist(s)	3	Katrin Hirtl-Stanggaßinger	Germany	1:17.80	1	1:15.54	4	2:33.34	+0.06
3rd place, bronze medalist(s)	5	Aline Danioth	Switzerland	1:18.46	3	1:15.49	3	2:33.95	+0.67
4	7	Meta Hrovat	Slovenia	1:18.68	4	1:15.55	5	2:34.23	+0.95
5	13	Ali Nullmeyer	Canada	1:19.44	5	1:15.29	1	2:34.73	+1.45
6	15	Lucia Rispler	Germany	1:19.68	6	1:16.00	7	2:35.68	+2.40
7	6	Sofia Pizzato	Italy	1:19.73	7	1:16.10	9	2:35.83	+2.55
8	9	Nadine Fest	Austria	1:20.50	11	1:15.72	6	2:36.22	+2.94
9	16	Julia Scheib	Austria	1:20.34	10	1:16.08	8	2:36.42	+3.14
10	8	Carlotta Saracco	Italy	1:19.84	8	1:16.62	12	2:36.46	+3.18
11	4	Riikka Honkanen	Finland	1:20.55	12	1:16.24	10	2:36.79	+3.51
12	18	Lana Zbašnik	Croatia	1:19.89	9	1:16.92	13	2:36.81	+3.53
13	11	Kajsa Vickhoff Lie	Norway	1:20.86	14	1:16.43	11	2:37.29	+4.01
14	14	Keely Cashman	United States	1:22.21	15	1:18.50	14	2:40.71	+7.43
15	26	Tereza Jančová	Slovakia	1:22.56	16	1:18.79	15	2:41.35	+8.07
16	29	Claire Tan	Netherlands	1:22.85	17	1:19.57	19	2:42.42	+9.14
17	28	Kenza Lacheb	France	1:23.87	20	1:19.56	18	2:43.43	+10.15
18	19	Kristiane Bekkestad	Norway	1:24.55	22	1:19.22	17	2:43.77	+10.49
19	17	Camille Cerutti	France	1:25.14	24	1:19.00	16	2:44.14	+10.86
20	27	Chiara Archam	Hungary	1:23.71	19	1:20.80	20	2:44.51	+11.23
21	33	Mirentxu Miquel	Spain	1:25.49	25	1:21.11	22	2:46.60	+13.32
22	22	Andrea Louise Arnold	Czech Republic	1:24.40	21	1:22.58	23	2:46.98	+13.70
23	39	Ida Sofie Bunsov Brøns	Denmark	1:26.85	27	1:21.00	21	2:47.85	+14.57
24	40	Lorita Stoimenova	Bulgaria	1:26.37	26	1:23.68	24	2:50.05	+16.77
25	41	Yekaterina Karpova	Kazakhstan	1:27.56	29	1:23.94	25	2:51.50	+18.22
26	37	Sabrina Simader	Kenya	1:28.59	31	1:24.37	26	2:52.96	+19.68
27	38	Magdalena Pfingsthorn	Chile	1:28.02	30	1:25.83	27	2:53.85	+20.57
28	42	Mariia Ponomarenko	Ukraine	1:31.42	34	1:27.42	28	2:58.84	+25.56
29	45	Jocelyn McGillivray	Mexico	1:31.32	32	1:27.53	29	2:58.85	+25.57
30	49	Eglė Augustaitytė	Lithuania	1:31.38	33	1:28.05	30	2:59.43	+26.15
31	51	Sonia Marie George	Lebanon	1:33.56	36	1:30.31	31	3:03.87	+30.59
32	47	Anastasia Mantsiou	Greece	1:36.87	38	1:32.36	32	3:09.23	+35.95
33	52	Anna Lotta Jõgeva	Estonia	1:37.57	39	1:32.54	33	3:10.11	+36.83
34	48	Selin Açıkgöz	Turkey	1:40.85	40	1:36.63	34	3:17.48	+44.20
35	44	Joana Lopes	Portugal	1:42.50	41	1:40.44	35	3:22.94	+49.66
36	54	Rachel Elizabeth Olivier	South Africa	1:46.60	42	1:42.07	36	3:28.67	+55.39
37	55	Ava Javadi	Iran	1:58.39	43	1:48.68	37	3:47.07	1:13.79
38	56	Chen Wei-hsuan	Chinese Taipei	2:42.80	44	2:25.57	38	5:08.37	2:35.09
	1	Amelia Smart	Canada	1:20.66	13	DNF			
	25	Francesca Baruzzi	Argentina	1:22.96	18	DNF			
	35	Elvedina Muzaferija	Bosnia and Herzegovina	1:24.58	23	DNF			
	36	Hólmfríður Dóra Friðgeirsdóttir	Iceland	1:27.32	28	DNF			
	43	Nadežda Milošević	Montenegro	1:34.50	37	DNF			
	46	Iulia Boier	Romania	1:33.34	35	DNF			
	10	Jonna Luthman	Sweden	DNF					
	12	Anastasiia Silanteva	Russia	DNF					
	20	Kim Vanreusel	Belgium	DNF					
	21	Živa Otoničar	Slovenia	DNF					
	23	Daria Krajewska	Poland	DNF					
	24	Kathryn Parker	Australia	DNF					
	30	Chisaki Maeda	Japan	DNF					
	31	Yasmin Cooper	Great Britain	DNF					
	32	Elizabeth Reid	New Zealand	DNF					
	34	Hong Ye-bin	South Korea	DNF					
	50	Milica Kovačević	Serbia	DNF					
	53	Andriani Pieri	Cyprus	DNS					
