= Alpine skiing at the 2016 Winter Youth Olympics – Girls' combined =

Girls' combined at the II Winter Youth Olympic Games
- Venue: Hafjell, Norway
- Date: 14 February
- Competitors: 41 from 33 nations
- Winning time: 1:55.74

Medalists
| 1st place, gold medalist(s) | | Aline Danioth | Switzerland |
| 2nd place, silver medalist(s) | | Mélanie Meillard | Switzerland |
| 3rd place, bronze medalist(s) | | Katrin Hirtl-Stanggaßinger | Germany |

The girls' combined competition of the alpine skiing events at the 2016 Winter Youth Olympics was held at the Hafjell Olympic Slope near Lillehammer, Norway, on 14 February. 41 athletes from 33 countries took part.

== Results ==
The race was started at 10:00.

| Rank | Bib | Name | Country | Super-G | Rank | Slalom | Rank | Total | Difference |
|---|---|---|---|---|---|---|---|---|---|
| 1st place, gold medalist(s) | 8 | Aline Danioth | Switzerland | 1:13.59 | 2 | 42.15 | 1 | 1:55.74 | |
| 2nd place, silver medalist(s) | 12 | Mélanie Meillard | Switzerland | 1:13.44 | 1 | 42.68 | 2 | 1:56.12 | +0.38 |
| 3rd place, bronze medalist(s) | 11 | Katrin Hirtl-Stanggaßinger | Germany | 1:14.13 | 3 | 43.12 | 4 | 1:57.25 | +1.51 |
| 4 | 6 | Nadine Fest | Austria | 1:14.44 | 6 | 42.91 | 3 | 1:57.35 | +1.61 |
| 5 | 14 | Kajsa Vickhoff Lie | Norway | 1:15.22 | 8 | 44.19 | 7 | 1:59.41 | +3.67 |
| 6 | 1 | Camille Cerutti | France | 1:15.25 | 9 | 44.87 | 11 | 2:00.12 | +4.38 |
| 7 | 30 | Carlotta Saracco | Italy | 1:15.72 | 10 | 44.65 | 8 | 2:00.37 | +4.63 |
| 8 | 20 | Amelia Smart | Canada | 1:16.79 | 13 | 44.13 | 6 | 2:00.92 | +5.18 |
| 9 | 2 | Kristiane Bekkestad | Norway | 1:17.10 | 14 | 43.95 | 5 | 2:01.05 | +5.31 |
| 10 | 21 | Tereza Jančová | Slovakia | 1:17.37 | 17 | 44.81 | 10 | 2:02.18 | +6.44 |
| 11 | 36 | Elizabeth Reid | New Zealand | 1:17.25 | 15 | 45.39 | 15 | 2:02.64 | +6.90 |
| 12 | 17 | Lana Zbašnik | Croatia | 1:17.66 | 20 | 45.22 | 14 | 2:02.88 | +7.14 |
| 13 | 31 | Yasmin Cooper | Great Britain | 1:17.49 | 19 | 45.40 | 16 | 2:02.89 | +7.15 |
| 14 | 27 | Anastasiia Silanteva | Russia | 1:16.09 | 12 | 46.88 | 18 | 2:02.97 | +7.23 |
| 15 | 35 | Chisaki Maeda | Japan | 1:18.52 | 23 | 44.79 | 9 | 2:03.31 | +7.57 |
| 16 | 3 | Elvedina Muzaferija | Bosnia and Herzegovina | 1:18.45 | 22 | 45.08 | 13 | 2:03.53 | +7.79 |
| 17 | 22 | Kathryn Parker | Australia | 1:17.32 | 16 | 46.98 | 19 | 2:04.30 | +8.56 |
| 18 | 33 | Francesca Baruzzi | Argentina | 1:19.44 | 27 | 44.97 | 12 | 2:04.41 | +8.67 |
| 19 | 40 | Živa Otoničar | Slovenia | 1:19.95 | 28 | 45.40 | 16 | 2:05.35 | +9.61 |
| 20 | 19 | Sabrina Simader | Kenya | 1:18.67 | 24 | 47.47 | 20 | 2:06.14 | +10.40 |
| 21 | 39 | Chiara Archam | Hungary | 1:19.02 | 25 | 47.59 | 21 | 2:06.61 | +10.87 |
| 22 | 26 | Yekaterina Karpova | Kazakhstan | 1:21.76 | 29 | 54.43 | 23 | 2:16.19 | +20.45 |
| 23 | 24 | Iulia Boier | Romania | 1:24.91 | 32 | 54.05 | 22 | 2:18.96 | +23.22 |
| 24 | 34 | Anna Lotta Jõgeva | Estonia | 1:26.07 | 33 | 56.17 | 24 | 2:22.24 | +26.50 |
| | 5 | Kenza Lacheb | France | 1:14.40 | 5 | DNF | | | |
| | 9 | Lucia Rispler | Germany | 1:14.97 | 7 | DNF | | | |
| | 10 | Julia Scheib | Austria | 1:14.22 | 4 | DNF | | | |
| | 16 | Keely Cashman | United States | 1:15.75 | 11 | DNF | | | |
| | 18 | Mariia Ponomarenko | Ukraine | 1:27.27 | 34 | DNF | | | |
| | 23 | Andrea Louise Arnold | Czech Republic | 1:18.21 | 21 | DNF | | | |
| | 25 | Ida Sofie Bunsov Brøns | Denmark | 1:19.14 | 26 | DNF | | | |
| | 28 | Milica Kovačević | Serbia | 1:22.57 | 31 | DNF | | | |
| | 32 | Mirentxu Miquel | Spain | 1:21.89 | 30 | DNF | | | |
| | 37 | Anastasia Mantsiou | Greece | 1:29.27 | 35 | DNF | | | |
| | 15 | Sofia Pizzato | Italy | 1:17.39 | 18 | DSQ | | | |
| | 4 | Daria Krajewska | Poland | DNF | | | | | |
| | 7 | Meta Hrovat | Slovenia | DNF | | | | | |
| | 13 | Ali Nullmeyer | Canada | DNF | | | | | |
| | 29 | Jonna Luthman | Sweden | DNF | | | | | |
| | 41 | Claire Tan | Netherlands | DNF | | | | | |
| | 38 | Lorita Stoimenova | Bulgaria | DSQ | | | | | |
