= Snowboarding at the 2016 Winter Youth Olympics =

Snowboarding at the II Winter Youth Olympic Games
- Venue: Kanthaugen Freestyle Arena and Hafjell
- Dates: 14–19 February
- Competitors: 79 from 32 nations

Snowboarding at the 2016 Winter Youth Olympics was held at the Kanthaugen Freestyle Arena, Lillehammer and Hafjell in Øyer Municipality, Norway from 14 to 19 February. The snowboard cross was added for each gender.

== Medal summary ==
=== Medal table ===
Rank	Nation	Gold	Silver	Bronze	Total
1	United States	5	1	0	6
2	Germany	1	0	1	2
3	France	1	0	0	1
4	Australia	0	2	0	2
4	Switzerland	0	2	0	2
6	Finland	0	1	2	3
7	Russia	0	1	0	1
8	Italy	0	0	1	1
8	Slovenia	0	0	1	1
8	South Korea	0	0	1	1
–	Mixed-NOCs	0	0	1	1
Totals (10 entries)		7	7	7	21

=== Boys' Events ===
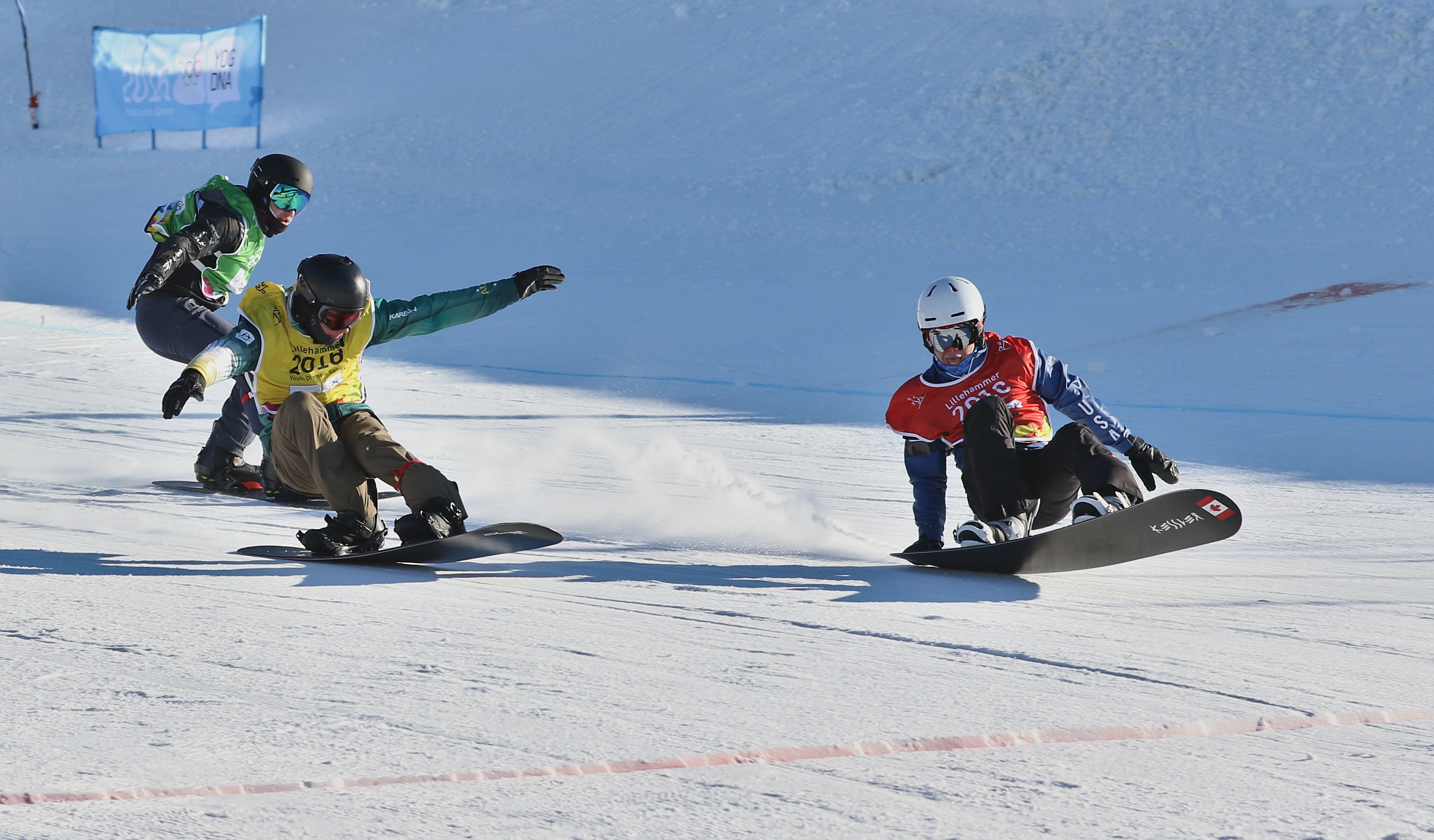
Snowboard cross final

Event	Gold		Silver		Bronze	
Boys' halfpipe	Jake Pates; United States	93.00	Nikolas Baden; United States	85.25	Tit Štante; Slovenia	80.25
Boys' slopestyle	Jake Pates; United States	94.75	Vlad Khadarin; Russia	90.25	Rene Rinnekangas; Finland	87.75
Boys' snowboard cross	Jake Vedder; United States		Alex Dickson; Australia		Sebastian Pietrzykowski; Germany	

=== Girls' Events ===
Event	Gold		Silver		Bronze	
Girls' halfpipe	Chloe Kim; United States	96.50	Emily Arthur; Australia	90.00	Jeong Yu-rim; South Korea	84.50
Girls' slopestyle	Chloe Kim; United States	88.25	Elli Pikkujämsä; Finland	82.25	Henna Ikola; Finland	79.25
Girls' snowboard cross	Manon Petit; France		Sophie Hediger; Switzerland		Caterina Carpano; Italy	

=== Mixed event ===
- Will include athletes from freestyle skiing

Event	Gold	Silver	Bronze
Team snowboard ski cross	Germany; Jana Fischer; Celia Funkler; Sebastian Pietrzykowski; Cornel Renn	Switzerland; Sophie Hediger; Talina Gantenbein; Pascal Bitschnau; Sascha Rüedi	Team 4 (MIX); Daryna Kyrychenko (UKR); Veronica Edebo (SWE); Valentin Miladinov (BUL); David Mobärg (SWE)

== Qualification system ==
All quotas were distributed using the results of the 2015 World Junior Championships. Each nation was allowed to enter one athlete per event. The total quota was 80 athletes (32 in snowboard cross, 24 in slopestyle and 24 in halfpipe).

Halfpipe

Event	Total	Qualified Boys'	Qualified Girls'
Host nation	1	Norway	Norway
Rankings	11	Austria; Belgium; China; Czech Republic; Finland; Germany; New Zealand; Slovenia; South Korea; Switzerland; United States	Australia; Canada; China; Finland; France; Japan; Slovenia; South Korea; Switzerland; United States; TBD
Total		12	12

Slopestyle

Event	Total	Qualified Boys'	Qualified Girls'
Host nation	1	Norway	Norway
Rankings	11	Austria; Croatia; Finland; France; Japan; Netherlands; New Zealand; Russia; South Korea; Switzerland; United States	Belarus; Belgium; Canada; Chile; Finland; France; Japan; Slovenia; Spain; Switzerland; United States
Total		12	12

Snowboard cross

Event	Total	Qualified Boys'	Qualified Girls'
Host nation	1/0	Norway	~~Norway~~
Rankings	15/16	Argentina; Australia; Austria; Bulgaria; Canada; Czech Republic; France; Germany; Hungary; Japan; Kazakhstan; Lithuania; Russia; Switzerland; Turkey; United States	Argentina; Australia; Austria; Canada; Chile; Czech Republic; France; Germany; Hungary; Italy; Poland; Russia; Spain; Switzerland; Turkey; Ukraine; United States
Total		16	16

=== Summary ===
NOC	Boys'			Girls'			Total
NOC	Half-pipe	Slopestyle	Snowboard cross	Half-pipe	Slopestyle	Snowboard cross	Total
Argentina			1			1	2
Australia			1			1	2
Austria	1	1	1			1	4
Belarus					1		1
Belgium	1				1		1
Bulgaria			1				1
Canada			1	1	1	1	4
Chile					1	1	2
China	1			1			2
Croatia		1					1
Czech Republic	1		1			1	3
Finland	1	1		1	1		4
France		1	1	1	1	1	5
Germany	1		1			1	3
Hungary			1			1	2
Italy						1	1
Japan		1	1	1	1		4
Kazakhstan			1				1
Lithuania			1				1
New Zealand	1	1					2
Netherlands		1					1
Norway	1	1	1	1	1		5
Poland						1	1
Russia		1	1			1	3
Slovenia	1			1	1		3
South Korea	1	1		1			3
Spain					1	1	2
Switzerland	1	1	1	1	1	1	6
Turkey			1			1	2
Ukraine						1	1
United States	1	1		1	1	1	5
Total: 32 NOCs	12	12	16	11	12	16	80
