= Snowboarding at the 2016 Winter Youth Olympics – Girls' snowboard cross =

Girls' snowboard cross at the II Winter Youth Olympic Games
- Venue: Hafjell Freepark
- Dates: 15 February
- Competitors: 15 from 15 nations

Medalists
1st place, gold medalist(s)		Manon Petit	France
2nd place, silver medalist(s)		Sophie Hediger	Switzerland
3rd place, bronze medalist(s)		Caterina Carpano	Italy

The girls' snowboard cross event at the 2016 Winter Youth Olympics took place on 15 February at the Hafjell Freepark.

== Results ==
=== Qualification ===
The qualification was held at 9:00.

Rank	Bib	Name	Country	Run 1	Rank	Run 2	Rank	Best Time	Notes
1	9	Manon Petit	France	49.26	1			49.26	Q
2	11	Sophie Hediger	Switzerland	49.72	2			49.72	Q
3	12	Kristina Paul	Russia	49.73	3			49.73	Q
4	7	Jana Fischer	Germany	51.27	4			51.27	Q
5	5	Shannon Maguire	United States	52.04	5			52.04	Q
6	10	Pia Zerkhold	Austria	52.27	6			52.27	Q
7	4	Caterina Carpano	Italy	52.44	7			52.44	Q
8	8	Mollie Fernandez	Australia	52.89	8			52.89	Q
9	6	Fiona Torello	Spain	53.69	9	53.79	1	53.69	Q
10	13	Antonia Yañez	Chile	54.21	10	55.18	3	54.21	Q
11	15	Zsófia Fehér	Hungary	54.23	11	57.86	4	54.23	Q
12	1	Sára Veselková	Czech Republic	54.41	12	54.84	2	54.41	Q
13	3	Audrey Shieh	Canada	55.12	13	59.18	6	55.12	Q
14	14	Daryna Kyrychenko	Ukraine	57.69	14	59.00	5	57.69	Q
15	2	Delfina Lemann	Argentina	1:02.33	15	1:01.27	7	1:01.27	Q

=== Group heats ===
The group heats was held at 10:10.

Rank	Bib	Athlete	Country	Group 1				Group 2				Group 3				Group 4				Group 5				Total
Rank	Bib	Athlete	Country	1	2	3	4	5	6	7	8	9	10	11	12	13	14	15	16	17	18	19	20	Total
1	1	Manon Petit	France	4				4				4				4				4				20
2	2	Sophie Hediger	Switzerland	3					4				4				4				4			19
3	3	Kristina Paul	Russia	2						4				4				4				4		18
4	4	Jana Fischer	Germany	1							2				4				4				4	15
5	7	Caterina Carpano	Italy		4					3					2	3					3			15
6	8	Mollie Fernandez	Australia		2						3			3			3			3				14
7	10	Antonia Yañez	Chile			4			3						3			2		2				14
8	6	Pia Zerkhold	Austria		3				1			3							3			3		13
9	5	Shannon Maguire	United States		1			3					3					3					3	13
10	12	Sára Veselková	Czech Republic			2					4		2			2						2		12
11	9	Fiona Torello	Spain			3		2						2					2		2			11
12	14	Daryna Kyrychenko	Ukraine				3		2					1		1							2	9
13	11	Zsófia Fehér	Hungary			1				2		2					2						1	8
14	15	Delfina Lemann	Argentina				2			1			1						1	1				6
15	13	Audrey Shieh	Canada				4	1							DNF		DNS					DNS		5

=== Semifinals ===
Heat 1

Rank	Bib	Name	Country	Notes
1	1	Manon Petit	France	BF
2	7	Caterina Carpano	Italy	BF
3	6	Pia Zerkhold	Austria	SF
4	4	Jana Fischer	Germany	SF

Heat 2

Rank	Bib	Name	Country	Notes
1	2	Sophie Hediger	Switzerland	BF
2	8	Mollie Fernandez	Australia	BF
3	10	Antonia Yañez	Chile	SF
4	3	Kristina Paul	Russia	SF

=== Finals ===
The final was held at 11:35.

Small final

Rank	Bib	Name	Country	Notes
5	3	Kristina Paul	Russia	
6	4	Jana Fischer	Germany	
7	10	Antonia Yañez	Chile	
8	6	Pia Zerkhold	Austria	

Big final

Rank	Bib	Name	Country	Notes
1st place, gold medalist(s)	1	Manon Petit	France	
2nd place, silver medalist(s)	2	Sophie Hediger	Switzerland	
3rd place, bronze medalist(s)	7	Caterina Carpano	Italy	
4	8	Mollie Fernandez	Australia	
