= Alpine skiing at the 2016 Winter Youth Olympics – Boys' giant slalom =

Boys' giant slalom at the II Winter Youth Olympic Games
- Venue: Hafjell, Norway
- Date: 17 February
- Competitors: 60 from 53 nations
- Winning time: 2:35.05

Medalists
| 1st place, gold medalist(s) | | River Radamus | United States |
| 2nd place, silver medalist(s) | | Yohei Koyama | Japan |
| 3rd place, bronze medalist(s) | | Anton Grammel | Germany |

The boys' giant slalom competition of the alpine skiing events at the 2016 Winter Youth Olympics was held at the Hafjell Olympic Slope near Lillehammer, Norway, on 17 February. 60 athletes from 53 different countries took part in this event.

== Results ==
The race was started at 10:00.

| Rank | Bib | Name | Country | Run 1 | Rank | Run 2 | Rank | Total | Difference |
|---|---|---|---|---|---|---|---|---|---|
| 1st place, gold medalist(s) | 9 | River Radamus | United States | 1:17.16 | 1 | 1:17.89 | 3 | 2:35.05 | |
| 2nd place, silver medalist(s) | 7 | Yohei Koyama | Japan | 1:18.00 | 3 | 1:18.12 | 4 | 2:36.12 | +1.07 |
| 3rd place, bronze medalist(s) | 5 | Anton Grammel | Germany | 1:18.71 | 4 | 1:17.83 | 2 | 2:36.54 | +1.49 |
| 4 | 17 | Manuel Traninger | Austria | 1:18.98 | 5 | 1:17.62 | 1 | 2:36.60 | +1.55 |
| 5 | 2 | Samuel Kolega | Croatia | 1:19.43 | 9 | 1:18.49 | 6 | 2:37.92 | +2.87 |
| 6 | 3 | Sampo Kankkunen | Finland | 1:19.18 | 6 | 1:19.36 | 9 | 2:38.54 | +3.49 |
| 7 | 8 | Sam Maes | Belgium | 1:19.62 | 10 | 1:19.18 | 8 | 2:38.80 | +3.75 |
| 8 | 16 | Jan Zabystřan | Czech Republic | 1:20.55 | 18 | 1:18.71 | 7 | 2:39.26 | +4.21 |
| 9 | 10 | Joel Oehrli | Switzerland | 1:19.25 | 7 | 1:20.07 | 13 | 2:39.32 | +4.27 |
| 10 | 12 | Maurus Sparr | Switzerland | 1:20.16 | 14 | 1:19.41 | 10 | 2:39.57 | +4.52 |
| 11 | 1 | Michael Tedde | Italy | 1:19.92 | 13 | 1:20.04 | 12 | 2:39.96 | +4.91 |
| 12 | 23 | Aleksey Konkov | Russia | 1:19.29 | 8 | 1:20.95 | 21 | 2:40.24 | +5.19 |
| 13 | 15 | Szymon Bębenek | Poland | 1:20.32 | 15 | 1:20.20 | 15 | 2:40.52 | +5.47 |
| 14 | 19 | Barnabás Szőllős | Hungary | 1:21.28 | 22 | 1:19.50 | 11 | 2:40.78 | +5.73 |
| 15 | 6 | Moritz Opetnik | Austria | 1:22.65 | 28 | 1:18.27 | 5 | 2:40.92 | +5.87 |
| 16 | 21 | Kai Horwitz | Chile | 1:21.07 | 20 | 1:20.60 | 16 | 2:41.67 | +6.62 |
| 17 | 36 | Iain Innes | Great Britain | 1:21.22 | 21 | 1:20.72 | 19 | 2:41.94 | +6.89 |
| 18 | 26 | Henrik Thorsby | Norway | 1:21.94 | 24 | 1:20.16 | 14 | 2:42.10 | +7.05 |
| 19 | 38 | Djordy Schaaf | Netherlands | 1:21.70 | 23 | 1:20.65 | 17 | 2:42.35 | +7.30 |
| 20 | 25 | Ken Caillot | France | 1:22.02 | 25 | 1:20.97 | 22 | 2:42.99 | +7.94 |
| 21 | 34 | Silvan Marxer | Liechtenstein | 1:22.41 | 26 | 1:20.66 | 18 | 2:43.07 | +8.02 |
| 22 | 24 | Justin Alkier | Canada | 1:20.48 | 17 | 1:22.85 | 26 | 2:43.33 | +8.28 |
| 23 | 30 | Anže Čufar | Slovenia | 1:22.42 | 27 | 1:20.93 | 20 | 2:43.35 | +8.30 |
| 24 | 31 | Henrich Katrenič | Slovakia | 1:23.43 | 29 | 1:21.05 | 23 | 2:44.48 | +9.43 |
| 25 | 29 | Georgi Okolski | Bulgaria | 1:23.91 | 31 | 1:21.98 | 24 | 2:45.89 | +10.84 |
| 26 | 44 | Rašo Jevremović | Serbia | 1:23.60 | 30 | 1:22.54 | 25 | 2:46.14 | +11.09 |
| 27 | 37 | Andrej Drukarov | Lithuania | 1:24.13 | 32 | 1:23.53 | 27 | 2:47.66 | +12.61 |
| 28 | 48 | Matthieu Osch | Luxembourg | 1:26.49 | 37 | 1:23.93 | 28 | 2:50.42 | +15.37 |
| 29 | 32 | Bae Jun-woo | South Korea | 1:25.32 | 36 | 1:25.35 | 29 | 2:50.67 | +15.62 |
| 30 | 54 | Alessandro Mariotti | San Marino | 1:27.03 | 38 | 1:25.81 | 30 | 2:52.84 | +17.79 |
| 31 | 35 | Tomas Bacigalupo | Argentina | 1:27.45 | 40 | 1:26.69 | 32 | 2:54.14 | +19.09 |
| 32 | 53 | Besarion Japaridze | Georgia | 1:27.63 | 41 | 1:26.54 | 31 | 2:54.17 | +19.12 |
| 33 | 55 | Eldar Salihović | Montenegro | 1:27.36 | 39 | 1:29.33 | 34 | 2:56.69 | +21.64 |
| 34 | 50 | Nihat Enes Limon | Turkey | 1:30.52 | 44 | 1:29.27 | 33 | 2:59.79 | +24.74 |
| 35 | 52 | Bjarki Guðjónsson | Iceland | 1:30.61 | 45 | 1:29.48 | 35 | 3:00.09 | +25.04 |
| 36 | 57 | Alireza Ahmadpour | Iran | 1:32.64 | 46 | 1:32.85 | 36 | 3:05.49 | +30.44 |
| 37 | 56 | Uladzislau Chertsin | Belarus | 1:29.56 | 43 | 1:39.13 | 37 | 3:08.69 | +33.64 |
| | 4 | Pietro Canzio | Italy | 1:17.69 | 2 | DNF | | | |
| | 11 | Odin Vassbotn Breivik | Norway | 1:20.84 | 19 | DNF | | | |
| | 13 | Filip Vennerström | Sweden | 1:19.77 | 12 | DNF | | | |
| | 14 | Léo Anguenot | France | 1:19.73 | 11 | DNF | | | |
| | 18 | Žaks Gedra | Latvia | 1:20.36 | 16 | DNF | | | |
| | 40 | Michael Poettoz | Colombia | 1:24.70 | 35 | DNF | | | |
| | 43 | Jackson Rich | New Zealand | 1:24.54 | 34 | DNF | | | |
| | 45 | Gary Skinner | Ireland | 1:28.89 | 42 | DNF | | | |
| | 46 | Luka Bozhinovski | Macedonia | 1:24.34 | 33 | DNF | | | |
| | 20 | Louis Muhlen | Australia | DNF | | | | | |
| | 22 | Ryan Moffat | Canada | DNF | | | | | |
| | 27 | Marcus Vorre | Denmark | DNF | | | | | |
| | 28 | Aingeru Garay | Spain | DNF | | | | | |
| | 33 | Michel Macedo | Brazil | DNF | | | | | |
| | 39 | Albert Pérez Fabrega | Andorra | DNF | | | | | |
| | 41 | Itamar Biran | Israel | DNF | | | | | |
| | 42 | Paul Croesi | Monaco | DNF | | | | | |
| | 47 | Andrea Bugnone | Portugal | DNF | | | | | |
| | 49 | Nejc Naraločnik | Slovenia | DNF | | | | | |
| | 51 | Jeffrey Zina | Lebanon | DNF | | | | | |
| | 58 | Alexandru Stefanescu | Romania | DNF | | | | | |
| | 59 | Saurabh Saurabh | India | DNF | | | | | |
| | 60 | Saphal-Ram Shrestha | Nepal | DNF | | | | | |
