= Alpine skiing at the 2016 Winter Youth Olympics – Boys' slalom =

Boys' slalom at the II Winter Youth Olympic Games
- Venue: Hafjell, Norway
- Date: 19 February
- Competitors: 62 from 54 nations
- Winning time: 1:38.74

Medalists
1st place, gold medalist(s)		Manuel Traninger	Austria
2nd place, silver medalist(s)		Filip Vennerström	Sweden
3rd place, bronze medalist(s)		Odin Vassbotn Breivik	Norway

The boys' slalom competition of the alpine skiing events at the 2016 Winter Youth Olympics was held at the Hafjell Olympic Slope near Lillehammer, Norway, on 19 February. 62 athletes from 55 different countries took part in this event.

== Results ==
The race was started at 10:00.

Rank	Bib	Name	Country	Run 1	Rank	Run 2	Rank	Total	Difference
1st place, gold medalist(s)	17	Manuel Traninger	Austria	49.94	3	48.80	1	1:38.74	
2nd place, silver medalist(s)	6	Filip Vennerström	Sweden	49.65	2	49.12	2	1:38.77	+0.03
3rd place, bronze medalist(s)	4	Odin Vassbotn Breivik	Norway	49.64	1	50.43	8	1:40.07	+1.33
4	9	Samuel Kolega	Croatia	50.45	5	49.69	3	1:40.14	+1.40
5	2	Pietro Canzio	Italy	50.30	4	50.44	9	1:40.74	+2.00
6	8	Moritz Opetnik	Austria	51.03	8	50.08	4	1:41.11	+2.37
7	21	Barnabás Szőllős	Hungary	51.09	11	50.27	7	1:41.36	+2.62
8	41	Marcus Vorre	Denmark	51.30	12	50.15	6	1:41.45	+2.71
9	20	Jonas Stockinger	Germany	50.78	6	50.72	11	1:41.50	+2.76
10	30	Sampo Kankkunen	Finland	51.08	10	50.95	12	1:42.03	+3.29
11	23	Henrik Thorsby	Norway	52.02	19	50.12	5	1:42.14	+3.40
12	24	Ken Caillot	France	51.71	17	50.96	13	1:42.67	+3.93
13	27	Szymon Bębenek	Poland	51.64	14	51.32	14	1:42.96	+4.22
13	18	Aingeru Garay	Spain	51.64	14	51.32	14	1:42.96	+4.22
15	10	Léo Anguenot	France	51.67	16	51.58	17	1:43.25	+4.51
16	33	Henrich Katrenič	Slovakia	52.30	23	51.50	16	1:43.80	+5.06
17	16	Kai Horwitz	Chile	52.25	21	51.87	19	1:44.12	+5.38
18	39	Albert Pérez Fabrega	Andorra	51.95	18	52.19	21	1:44.14	+5.40
19	12	Sam Maes	Belgium	53.63	28	50.59	10	1:44.22	+5.48
20	38	Iain Innes	Great Britain	52.11	20	52.14	20	1:44.25	+5.51
21	22	Maurus Sparr	Switzerland	51.52	13	52.85	23	1:44.37	+5.63
22	26	Djordy Schaaf	Netherlands	52.93	25	51.70	18	1:44.63	+5.89
23	37	Rašo Jevremović	Serbia	53.01	27	52.21	22	1:45.22	+6.48
24	42	Ryan Moffat	Canada	52.98	26	52.92	25	1:45.90	+7.16
25	34	Paul Croesi	Monaco	54.30	30	52.91	24	1:47.21	+8.47
26	43	Bae Jun-woo	South Korea	53.88	29	53.65	27	1:47.53	+8.79
27	55	Andrea Bugnone	Portugal	54.53	31	53.34	26	1:47.87	+9.13
28	57	Besarion Japaridze	Georgia	55.40	33	54.87	28	1:50.27	+11.53
29	46	Jeffrey Zina	Lebanon	56.42	37	55.50	29	1:51.92	+13.18
30	45	Tomas Bacigalupo	Argentina	56.00	36	56.20	30	1:52.20	+13.46
31	52	Nihat Enes Limon	Turkey	57.90	38	57.05	32	1:54.95	+16.21
32	59	Alessandro Mariotti	San Marino	58.23	40	56.84	31	1:55.07	+16.33
33	58	Gary Skinner	Ireland	57.98	39	57.39	33	1:55.37	+16.63
34	62	Alireza Ahmadpour	Iran	1:03.00	42	1:00.71	34	2:03.71	+24.97
	3	Joel Oehrli	Switzerland	52.28	22	DNF			
	19	Anže Čufar	Slovenia	50.91	7	DNF			
	31	Nejc Naraločnik	Slovenia	51.04	9	DNF			
	35	Itamar Biran	Israel	55.15	32	DNF			
	48	Alexandru Stefanescu	Romania	55.70	35	DNF			
	50	Bjarki Guðjónsson	Iceland	55.41	34	DNF			
	56	Jackson Rich	New Zealand	1:00.70	41	DNF			
	29	Justin Alkier	Canada	52.31	24	DSQ			
	1	Michael Tedde	Italy	DNF					
	5	Yohei Koyama	Japan	DNF					
	7	River Radamus	United States	DNF					
	11	Jan Zabystřan	Czech Republic	DNF					
	13	Žaks Gedra	Latvia	DNF					
	14	Louis Muhlen	Australia	DNF					
	15	Georgi Okolski	Bulgaria	DNF					
	25	Michel Macedo	Brazil	DNF					
	28	Aleksey Konkov	Russia	DNF					
	32	Silvan Marxer	Liechtenstein	DNF					
	36	Anton Grammel	Germany	DNF					
	40	Mykhailo Karpushyn	Ukraine	DNF					
	44	Michael Poettoz	Colombia	DNF					
	47	Andrej Drukarov	Lithuania	DNF					
	49	Luka Bozhinovski	Macedonia	DNF					
	51	Eldar Salihović	Montenegro	DNF					
	53	Matthieu Osch	Luxembourg	DNF					
	54	Uladzislau Chertsin	Belarus	DNF					
	60	Saurabh Saurabh	India	DNF					
	61	Saphal-Ram Shrestha	Nepal	DNF					
