= Alpine skiing at the 2016 Winter Youth Olympics – Boys' super-G =

Boys' super-G at the II Winter Youth Olympic Games
- Venue: Hafjell, Norway
- Date: 13 February 2016
- Competitors: 52 from 44 nations
- Winning time: 1:10.62

Medalists
1st place, gold medalist(s)		River Radamus	United States
2nd place, silver medalist(s)		Pietro Canzio	Italy
3rd place, bronze medalist(s)		Manuel Traninger	Austria

The boys' Super-G competition of the 2016 Winter Youth Olympics was held at the Hafjell Olympic Slope near Lillehammer, Norway, on Saturday, 13 February.

== Results ==
The race was started at 12:00.

Rank	Bib	Name	Country	Time	Difference
1st place, gold medalist(s)	1	River Radamus	United States	1:10.62	
2nd place, silver medalist(s)	7	Pietro Canzio	Italy	1:10.65	+0.03
3rd place, bronze medalist(s)	8	Manuel Traninger	Austria	1:11.03	+0.41
4	9	Sampo Kankkunen	Finland	1:11.04	+0.42
5	12	Marcus Vorre	Denmark	1:11.31	+0.69
6	14	Joel Oehrli	Switzerland	1:11.41	+0.79
7	11	Michael Tedde	Italy	1:11.52	+0.90
8	10	Moritz Opetnik	Austria	1:11.78	+1.16
9	13	Henrik Thorsby	Norway	1:11.79	+1.17
10	15	Odin Vassbotn Breivik	Norway	1:11.82	+1.20
11	6	Ken Caillot	France	1:12.03	+1.41
12	23	Jan Zabystřan	Czech Republic	1:12.16	+1.54
13	5	Szymon Bębenek	Poland	1:12.24	+1.62
14	44	Maurus Sparr	Switzerland	1:12.25	+1.63
15	3	Michel Macedo	Brazil	1:12.35	+1.73
16	30	Barnabás Szőllős	Hungary	1:12.38	+1.76
17	19	Yohei Koyama	Japan	1:12.57	+1.95
18	17	Léo Anguenot	France	1:12.67	+2.05
19	21	Justin Alkier	Canada	1:12.68	+2.06
20	4	Aleksey Konkov	Russia	1:12.80	+2.18
21	31	Ryan Moffat	Canada	1:12.95	+2.33
22	35	Nejc Naraločnik	Slovenia	1:13.02	+2.40
23	34	Sam Maes	Belgium	1:13.30	+2.68
24	26	Kai Horwitz	Chile	1:13.34	+2.72
25	29	Anton Grammel	Germany	1:13.36	+2.74
26	18	Albert Pérez	Andorra	1:13.44	+2.82
27	2	Henrich Katrenič	Slovakia	1:13.89	+3.27
28	16	Silvan Marxer	Liechtenstein	1:13.94	+3.32
29	27	Louis Muhlen	Australia	1:14.35	+3.73
30	45	Rašo Jevremović	Serbia	1:14.46	+3.84
31	56	Andrea Bugnone	Portugal	1:14.47	+3.85
32	33	Iain Innes	Great Britain	1:14.52	+3.90
33	28	Aingeru Garay	Spain	1:14.84	+4.22
34	38	Matthieu Osch	Luxembourg	1:14.88	+4.26
35	37	Andrej Drukarov	Lithuania	1:15.10	+4.48
36	51	Žaks Gedra	Latvia	1:15.42	+4.80
37	54	Djordy Schaaf	Netherlands	1:15.49	+4.87
38	42	Itamar Biran	Israel	1:15.58	+4.96
39	25	Georgi Okolski	Bulgaria	1:15.90	+5.28
40	32	Anže Čufar	Slovenia	1:16.17	+5.55
41	39	Paul Croesi	Monaco	1:16.22	+5.60
42	46	Tomas Bacigalupo	Argentina	1:17.29	+6.67
43	43	Uladzislau Chertsin	Belarus	1:18.06	+7.44
44	48	Jeffrey Zina	Lebanon	1:18.69	+8.07
45	47	Gary Skinner	Ireland	1:18.87	+8.25
46	41	Mykhailo Karpushyn	Ukraine	1:19.41	+8.79
	20	Filip Vennerström	Sweden	DNF	
	22	Samuel Kolega	Croatia	DNF	
	24	Jonas Stockinger	Germany	DNF	
	36	Alexandru Stefanescu	Romania	DNF	
	40	Luka Bozhinovski	Macedonia	DNF	
	49	Jackson Rich	New Zealand	DNF	
	52	Bjarki Guðjónsson	Iceland	DNS	
	53	Nihat Enes Limon	Turkey	DNS	
	55	Saurabh Saurabh	India	DNS	
