= Alpine skiing at the 2016 Winter Youth Olympics – Boys' combined =

Boys' combined at the II Winter Youth Olympic Games
- Venue: Hafjell, Norway
- Date: 14 February
- Competitors: 53 from 45 nations
- Winning time: 1:52.87

Medalists
1st place, gold medalist(s)		River Radamus	United States
2nd place, silver medalist(s)		Manuel Traninger	Austria
3rd place, bronze medalist(s)		Pietro Canzio	Italy

The boys combined competition of the alpine skiing events at the 2016 Winter Youth Olympics was held at the Hafjell Olympic Slope near Lillehammer, Norway, on 14 February. 53 athletes from 45 countries took part in this event.

== Results ==
The race was started at 11:00.

Rank	Bib	Name	Country	Super-G	Rank	Slalom	Rank	Total	Difference
1st place, gold medalist(s)	1	River Radamus	United States	1:11.15	1	41.72	7	1:52.87	
2nd place, silver medalist(s)	7	Manuel Traninger	Austria	1:12.36	4	40.58	2	1:52.94	+0.07
3rd place, bronze medalist(s)	5	Pietro Canzio	Italy	1:12.45	6	41.20	3	1:53.65	+0.78
4	37	Filip Vennerström	Sweden	1:13.60	21	40.32	1	1:53.92	+1.05
5	8	Sampo Kankkunen	Finland	1:12.27	3	41.93	9	1:54.20	+1.33
6	12	Jan Zabystřan	Czech Republic	1:13.36	17	41.25	4	1:54.61	+1.74
7	6	Joel Oehrli	Switzerland	1:12.46	7	42.32	12	1:54.78	+1.91
8	36	Yohei Koyama	Japan	1:13.15	12	41.72	7	1:54.87	+2.00
9	13	Ken Caillot	France	1:13.26	13	41.71	6	1:54.97	+2.10
10	3	Michael Tedde	Italy	1:12.04	2	43.08	18	1:55.12	+2.25
11	11	Szymon Bębenek	Poland	1:13.32	15	41.97	10	1:55.29	+2.42
12	24	Aleksey Konkov	Russia	1:13.07	10	42.90	15	1:55.97	+3.10
13	20	Samuel Kolega	Croatia	1:14.42	26	41.57	5	1:55.99	+3.12
14	16	Anton Grammel	Germany	1:13.26	13	43.06	17	1:56.32	+3.45
15	18	Henrich Katrenič	Slovakia	1:13.14	11	43.47	20	1:56.61	+3.74
16	51	Žaks Gedra	Latvia	1:14.73	30	41.97	10	1:56.70	+3.83
17	32	Louis Muhlen	Australia	1:13.80	23	43.23	19	1:57.03	+4.16
18	38	Aingeru Garay	Spain	1:14.58	29	42.78	14	1:57.36	+4.49
19	27	Anže Čufar	Slovenia	1:14.51	28	42.94	16	1:57.45	+4.58
20	30	Kai Horwitz	Chile	1:13.35	16	44.26	23	1:57.61	+4.74
21	50	Andrea Bugnone	Portugal	1:14.47	27	43.74	21	1:58.21	+5.34
22	25	Georgi Okolski	Bulgaria	1:16.54	36	42.40	13	1:58.94	+6.07
23	44	Itamar Biran	Israel	1:15.23	32	43.87	22	1:59.10	+6.23
24	42	Luka Bozhinovski	Macedonia	1:15.35	33	45.81	25	2:01.16	+8.29
25	53	Jackson Rich	New Zealand	1:16.76	38	46.28	27	2:03.04	+10.17
26	22	Jeffrey Zina	Lebanon	1:18.74	42	45.68	24	2:04.42	+11.55
27	19	Alexandru Stefanescu	Romania	1:18.57	41	45.96	26	2:04.53	+11.66
28	47	Tomas Bacigalupo	Argentina	1:17.90	40	48.03	28	2:05.93	+13.06
29	48	Gary Skinner	Ireland	1:17.60	39	48.67	29	2:06.27	+13.40
30	26	Sam Maes	Belgium	1:13.63	22	1:04.27	30	2:17.90	+25.03
	2	Odin Vassbotn Breivik	Norway	1:13.00	9	DNF			
	15	Marcus Vorre	Denmark	1:12.43	5	DNF			
	17	Nejc Naraločnik	Slovenia	1:12.98	8	DNF			
	29	Michel Macedo	Brazil	1:13.36	17	DNF			
	31	Justin Alkier	Canada	1:13.57	20	DNF			
	33	Léo Anguenot	France	1:14.07	24	DNF			
	39	Iain Innes	Great Britain	1:16.32	35	DNF			
	41	Paul Croesi	Monaco	1:16.67	37	DNF			
	45	Maurus Sparr	Switzerland	1:13.49	19	DNF			
	49	Djordy Schaaf	Netherlands	1:15.36	34	DNF			
	4	Jonas Stockinger	Germany	1:14.27	25	DNS			
	35	Albert Pérez Fabrega	Andorra	1:14.84	31	DSQ			
	9	Moritz Opetnik	Austria	DNF					
	10	Silvan Marxer	Liechtenstein	DNF					
	14	Henrik Thorsby	Norway	DNF					
	21	Matthieu Osch	Luxembourg	DNF					
	28	Uladzislau Chertsin	Belarus	DNF					
	34	Barnabás Szőllős	Hungary	DNF					
	40	Andrej Drukarov	Lithuania	DNF					
	43	Mykhailo Karpushyn	Ukraine	DNF					
	46	Rašo Jevremović	Serbia	DNF					
	52	Eldar Salihović	Montenegro	DNF					
	23	Ryan Moffat	Canada	DSQ					
	54	Saurabh Saurabh	India	DNS					
	55	Besarion Japaridze	Georgia	DNS					
