= Ukraine at the 2016 Winter Youth Olympics =

- IOC code: UKR
- NOC: National Olympic Committee of Ukraine
- Website: www.noc-ukr.org

in Lillehammer
- Competitors: 23 in 9 sports
- Medals Ranked 17th: Gold 1 Silver 0 Bronze 0 Total 1

Winter Youth Olympics appearances (overview)
- 2012; 2016; 2020; 2024

Ukraine competed at the 2016 Winter Youth Olympics in Lillehammer, Norway from 12 to 21 February 2016.

Some of the athletes later represented Ukraine at the Winter Olympics. Vladyslav Heraskevych (skeleton) competed at the 2018, 2022 and 2026 Winter Olympics. Dmytro Mazurchuk (Nordic combined) represented Ukraine at the 2022 and 2026 Winter Olympics. Andriy Orlyk (cross-country skiing) represented Ukraine at the 2018 Winter Olympics. Yuliia Krol (cross-country skiing), Ivan Shmuratko (figure skating), Ihor Stakhiv and Andriy Lysetskyy (both luge) represented Ukraine at the 2022 Winter Olympics. Khrystyna Dmytrenko (biathlon) and Olena Smaha (luge) represented Ukraine at the 2026 Winter Olympics.

== Medalists ==
Medal	Name	Sport	Event	Date
Gold	Khrystyna Dmytrenko	Biathlon	Girls' Pursuit	15 February

=== Medalists in mixed NOCs events ===
Medal	Name	Sport	Event	Date
Silver	Ivan Shmuratko	Figure skating	Team trophy	20 February
Bronze	Daryna Kyrychenko	Snowboarding	Team snowboard ski cross	16 February

== Competitors ==
The following is the list of number of competitors (per gender) participating at the games per sport/discipline.

Sport	Boys	Girls	Total
Alpine skiing	1	1	2
Biathlon	2	2	4
Cross-country skiing	1	1	2
Figure skating	4	3	7
Luge	3	1	4
Nordic combined	1	0	1
Skeleton	1	0	1
Ski jumping	1	0	1
Snowboarding	0	1	1
Total	14	9	23

== Alpine skiing ==
Boys

Athlete	Event	Run 1		Run 2		Total	
Athlete	Event	Time	Rank	Time	Rank	Time	Rank
Mykhaylo Karpushyn	Slalom	DNF		did not advance			
Mykhaylo Karpushyn	Super-G	—N/a				1:19.41	46
Mykhaylo Karpushyn	Combined	DNF		did not advance			

Girls

Athlete	Event	Run 1		Run 2		Total	
Athlete	Event	Time	Rank	Time	Rank	Time	Rank
Mariia Ponomarenko	Slalom	1:09.25	34	did not finish			
Mariia Ponomarenko	Giant slalom	1:31.42	34	1:27.42	28	2:58.84	28
Mariia Ponomarenko	Super-G	—N/a				1:26.48	37
Mariia Ponomarenko	Combined	1:27.27	34	did not finish			

== Biathlon ==
Boys

Athlete	Event	Time	Misses	Rank
Yurii Sytnyk	Sprint	22:44.3	7	43
Yurii Sytnyk	Pursuit	35:22.6	7	40
Serhiy Telen	Sprint	20:33.1	3	15
Serhiy Telen	Pursuit	30:52.6	4	8

Girls

Athlete	Event	Time	Misses	Rank
Khrystyna Dmytrenko	Sprint	18:46.7	1	4
Khrystyna Dmytrenko	Pursuit	25:12.9	2	1st place, gold medalist(s)
Liubov Kypiachenkova	Sprint	20:39.0	4	27
Liubov Kypiachenkova	Pursuit	29:09.7	5	25

Mixed

Athletes	Event	Time	Misses	Rank
Khrystyna Dmytrenko; Serhiy Telen	Single mixed relay	43:10.7	4+14	9
Khrystyna Dmytrenko; Liuboy Kypiachenkova; Yurii Sytnyk; Serhiy Telen	Mixed relay	1:21:26.8	1+18	6

== Cross-country skiing ==
Boys

Athlete	Event	Qualification		Quarterfinal		Semifinal		Final	
Athlete	Event	Time	Rank	Time	Rank	Time	Rank	Time	Rank
Andriy Orlyk	10 km freestyle	—N/a						24:13.4	5
Andriy Orlyk	Classical sprint	3:07.83	16 Q	3:03.63	4	did not advance			
Andriy Orlyk	Cross-country cross	3:14.56	15 Q	—N/a		3:12.21	5	did not advance	

Girls

Athlete	Event	Qualification		Quarterfinal		Semifinal		Final	
Athlete	Event	Time	Rank	Time	Rank	Time	Rank	Time	Rank
Yuliia Krol	5 km freestyle	—N/a						15:01.8	27
Yuliia Krol	Classical sprint	3:46.43	29 Q	3:32.65	3	did not advance			
Yuliia Krol	Cross-country cross	3:59.85	28 Q	—N/a		3:52.10	8	did not advance	

== Figure skating ==
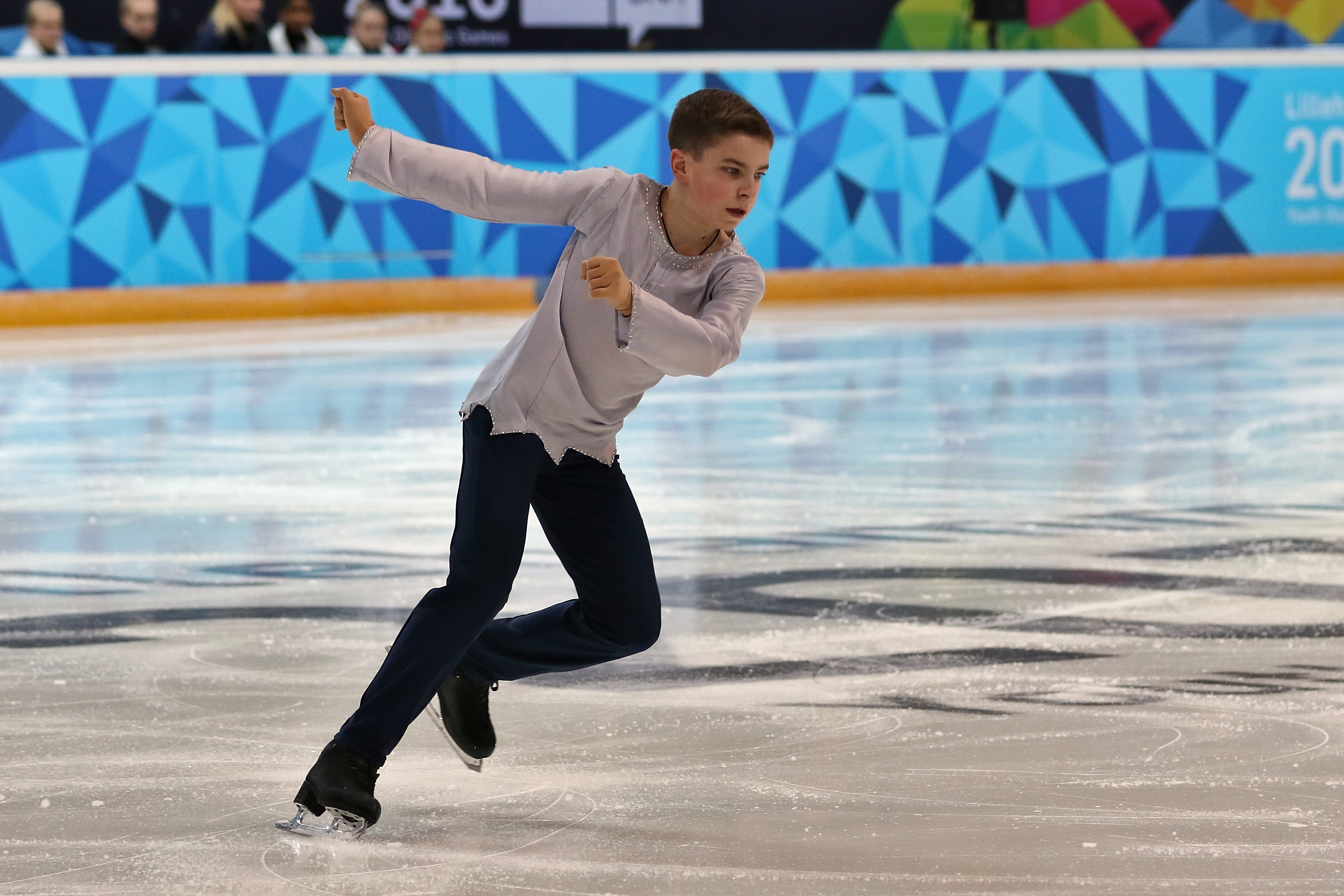
Ivan Shmuratko competing in the short program.

Singles

Athlete	Event	SP		FS		Total	
Athlete	Event	Points	Rank	Points	Rank	Points	Rank
Ivan Shmuratko	Boys' singles	42.39	14	83.39	14	125.78	14

Couples

Athletes	Event	SP/SD		FS/FD		Total	
Athletes	Event	Points	Rank	Points	Rank	Points	Rank
Anastasia Pobizhenko; Dmytro Sharpar	Pairs	28.16	10	46.14	10	74.30	10
Maria Golubtsova; Kirill Belobrov	Ice dancing	41.37	9	66.29	6	107.66	7
Anzhelika Yurchenko; Volodymyr Byelikov	Ice dancing	48.00	5	66.96	5	114.96	5

Mixed NOC team trophy

Athletes	Event	Free skate/Free dance					
Athletes	Event	Ice dance	Pairs	Girls	Boys	Total	
Athletes	Event	Points Team points	Points Team points	Points Team points	Points Team points	Points	Rank
Team Focus; Maria Golubtsova / Kirill Belobrov (UKR); Zhao Ying / Xie Zhong (CHN); Yuna Shiraiwa (JPN); Lauri Lankila (FIN)	Team trophy	64.68; 4	92.74; 5	110.01; 8	61.57; 1	18	5
Team Future; Julia Wagret / Mathieu Couyras (FRA); Anna Duskova / Martin Bidar (CZE); Diana Nikitina (LAT); Ivan Shmuratko (UKR)	Team trophy	63.06; 3	103.91; 7	107.47; 7	89.66; 3	20	2nd place, silver medalist(s)

== Luge ==
Individual sleds

Athlete	Event	Run 1		Run 2		Total	
Athlete	Event	Time	Rank	Time	Rank	Time	Rank
Ihor Stakhiv	Boys	48.965	14	48.771	12	1:37.735	13
Olena Smaha	Girls	53.780	9	53.712	10	1:47.492	10
Myroslav Levkovych; Andriy Lysetskyy	Doubles	57.218	13	53.749	7	1:50.967	13

Mixed team relay

Athlete	Event	Girls		Boys		Doubles		Total	
Athlete	Event	Time	Rank	Time	Rank	Time	Rank	Time	Rank
Olena Smaha; Ihor Stakhiv; Andriy Lysetskyy; Myroslav Levkovych	Team relay	57.605	5	59.202	9	1:00.121	10	2:56.928	7

== Nordic combined ==
Athlete	Event	Ski jumping				Cross-country	
Athlete	Event	Distance	Points	Rank	Deficit	Time	Rank
Dmytro Mazurchuk	Normal hill/5 km	91.0	113.6	8	1:13	14:25.3	7

== Skeleton ==
Athlete	Event	Run 1		Run 2		Total	
Athlete	Event	Time	Rank	Time	Rank	Time	Rank
Vladyslav Heraskevych	Boys	54.70	9	54.67	8	1:49.37	8

== Ski jumping ==
Athlete	Event	First round			Final			Total	
Athlete	Event	Distance	Points	Rank	Distance	Points	Rank	Points	Rank
Stepan Pasichnyk	Boys' normal hill	83.5	93.8	14	83.0	92.9	12	186.7	13

== Snowboarding ==
Snowboard cross

Athlete	Event	Qualification		Group heats		Semifinal	Final
Athlete	Event	Time	Rank	Points	Rank	Position	Position
Daryna Kyrychenko	Girls' snowboard cross	57.69	14 Q	9	12	did not advance	

Snowboard and ski cross relay

Athlete	Event	Quarterfinal	Semifinal	Final
Athlete	Event	Position	Position	Position
Daryna Kyrychenko (UKR); Veronica Edebo (SWE); Valentin Miladinov (BUL); David Mobaerg (SWE)	Team snowboard ski cross	1 Q	2 FA	3rd place, bronze medalist(s)

Qualification legend: FA – Qualify to medal round; FB – Qualify to consolation round

== See also ==
- Ukraine at the 2016 Summer Olympics
