= Lebanon at the 2016 Winter Youth Olympics =

- IOC code: LIB
- NOC: Lebanese Olympic Committee
- Website: www.lebolymp.org

in Lillehammer
- Competitors: 2 in 1 sport
- Medals: Gold 0 Silver 0 Bronze 0 Total 0

Winter Youth Olympics appearances
- 2012; 2016; 2020; 2024

Lebanon competed at the 2016 Winter Youth Olympics in Lillehammer, Norway from 12 to 21 February 2016. The Lebanese team consists of two athletes in two sports.

== Competitors ==
Sport	Men	Women	Total
Alpine skiing	1	1	2
Total	1	1	2

== Alpine skiing ==
Lebanon qualified one boy and one girl.

Boys

Athlete	Event	Run 1		Run 2		Total	
Athlete	Event	Time	Rank	Time	Rank	Time	Rank
Jeffrey Zina	Slalom	56.42	37	55.50	29	1:51.92	29
Jeffrey Zina	Giant slalom	DNF		did not advance			
Jeffrey Zina	Super-G	—				1:18.69	44
Jeffrey Zina	Combined	1:18.74	42	45.68	24	2:04.42	26

Girls

Athlete	Event	Run 1		Run 2		Total	
Athlete	Event	Time	Rank	Time	Rank	Time	Rank
Sonia George	Slalom	1:09.99	36	1:05.36	29	2:15.35	29
Sonia George	Giant slalom	1:33.56	36	1:30.31	31	3:03.87	31

== See also ==
- Lebanon at the 2016 Summer Olympics
