= Mexico at the 2016 Winter Youth Olympics =

- IOC code: MEX
- NOC: Comité Olímpico Mexicano

in Lillehammer
- Competitors: 2 in 2 sports
- Medals: Gold 0 Silver 0 Bronze 0 Total 0

Winter Youth Olympics appearances (overview)
- 2012; 2016; 2020; 2024

Mexico competed at the 2016 Winter Youth Olympics in Lillehammer, Norway from 12 to 21 February 2016.

== Competitors ==
Sport	Men	Women	Total
Alpine skiing		1	1
Freestyle skiing	1		1
Total	1	1	2

== Alpine skiing ==
Mexico qualified one girl.

Girls

Athlete	Event	Run 1		Run 2		Total	
Athlete	Event	Time	Rank	Time	Rank	Time	Rank
Jocelyn McGillivray	Slalom	1:07.17	32	1:00.68	27	2:07.85	27
Jocelyn McGillivray	Giant slalom	1:31.32	32	1:27.53	29	2:58.85	29

== Freestyle skiing ==
Mexico received a reallocated spot in the boys' ski cross event.

Ski cross

Athlete	Event	Qualification		Group heats		Semifinal	Final
Athlete	Event	Time	Rank	Points	Rank	Position	Position
Fernando Soto Herrera	Boys' ski cross	47.28	16 Q	8	13	did not advance	

== Snowboarding ==
Snowboard and ski cross relay

Athlete	Event	Quarterfinal	Semifinal	Final
Athlete	Event	Position	Position	Position
Sara Veselkova (CZE); Klara Kasparova (CZE); Matous Koudelka (CZE); Fernando Soto Herrera (MEX)	Team snowboard ski cross	DNF	did not advance	

Qualification legend: FA – Qualify to medal round; FB – Qualify to consolation round

== See also ==
- Mexico at the 2016 Summer Olympics
