= Iran at the 2016 Winter Youth Olympics =

- IOC code: IRI
- NOC: Iran Olympic Committee
- Website: www.olympic.ir

in Lillehammer
- Competitors: 2 in 1 sport
- Medals: Gold 0 Silver 0 Bronze 0 Total 0

Winter Youth Olympics appearances (overview)
- 2012; 2016; 2020; 2024

Iran competed at the 2016 Winter Youth Olympics in Lillehammer, Norway from 12 to 21 February 2016.

== Alpine skiing ==
Boy

Athlete	Event	Run 1		Run 2		Total	
Athlete	Event	Time	Rank	Time	Rank	Time	Rank
Alireza Ahmadpour	Slalom	1:03.00	42	1:00.71	34	2:03.71	34
Alireza Ahmadpour	Giant slalom	1:32.64	46	1:32.85	36	3:05.49	36
Alireza Ahmadpour	Super-G	—N/a				DNS	

Girl

Athlete	Event	Run 1		Run 2		Total	
Athlete	Event	Time	Rank	Time	Rank	Time	Rank
Ava Javadi	Slalom	1:21.34	39	1:17.03	33	2:38.37	33
Ava Javadi	Giant slalom	1:58.39	43	1:48.68	37	2:47.07	37

== See also ==
- Iran at the 2016 Summer Olympics
