= Luxembourg at the 2016 Winter Youth Olympics =

- IOC code: LUX
- NOC: Luxembourgian Olympic and Sporting Committee

in Lillehammer
- Competitors: 1 in 1 sport
- Medals: Gold 0 Silver 0 Bronze 0 Total 0

Winter Youth Olympics appearances
- 2012; 2016; 2020; 2024

Luxembourg competed at the 2016 Winter Youth Olympics in Lillehammer, Norway from 12 to 21 February 2016. The team consisted of one male athlete in alpine skiing.

== Competitors ==
Sport	Men	Women	Total
Alpine skiing	1		1
Total	1		1

== Alpine skiing ==
Luxembourg qualified one boy.

Boys

Athlete	Event	Run 1		Run 2		Total	
Athlete	Event	Time	Rank	Time	Rank	Time	Rank
Matthieu Osch	Slalom	DNF		did not advance			
Matthieu Osch	Giant slalom	1:26.49	37	1:23.93	28	2:50.42	28
Matthieu Osch	Super-G	—				1:14.88	34
Matthieu Osch	Combined	DNF		did not advance			

== See also ==
- Luxembourg at the 2016 Summer Olympics
