= Greece at the 2016 Winter Youth Olympics =

- IOC code: GRE
- NOC: Hellenic Olympic Committee
- Website: www.hoc.gr

in Lillehammer
- Competitors: 3 in 3 sports
- Medals: Gold 0 Silver 0 Bronze 0 Total 0

Winter Youth Olympics appearances
- 2012; 2016; 2020; 2024

Greece competed at the 2016 Winter Youth Olympics in Lillehammer, Norway from 12 to 21 February 2016.

== Alpine skiing ==
Girls

Athlete	Event	Run 1		Run 2		Total	
Athlete	Event	Time	Rank	Time	Rank	Time	Rank
Anastasia Mantsiou	Slalom	1:07.30	33	1:02.73	28	2:10.03	28
Anastasia Mantsiou	Giant slalom	1:36.87	38	1:32.36	32	3:09.23	32
Anastasia Mantsiou	Super-G	—				DNF	
Anastasia Mantsiou	Combined	1:29.27	35	did not finish			

== Biathlon ==
Boys

Athlete	Event	Time	Misses	Rank
Nikolaos Mavridis	Sprint	26:46.7	7	49
Nikolaos Mavridis	Pursuit	42:18.3	3	47

== Cross-country skiing ==
Boys

Athlete	Event	Qualification		Semifinal		Final	
Athlete	Event	Time	Rank	Time	Rank	Time	Rank
Nikolaos Tsourekas	10 km freestyle	—				27:47.5	38
Nikolaos Tsourekas	Cross-country cross	3:36.17	40	did not advance			

== See also ==
- Greece at the 2016 Summer Olympics
