= France at the 2016 Winter Youth Olympics =

- IOC code: FRA
- NOC: French Olympic Committee
- Website: franceolympique.com

in Lillehammer
- Competitors: 32 in 12 sports
- Medals Ranked 13th: Gold 2 Silver 1 Bronze 3 Total 6

Winter Youth Olympics appearances
- 2012; 2016; 2020; 2024

France competed at the 2016 Winter Youth Olympics in Lillehammer, Norway from 12 to 21 February 2016.

== Medalists ==
| Medal | Name | Sport | Event | Date |
|---|---|---|---|---|
| Gold | Emilien Claude | Biathlon | Boys' sprint | 14 February |
| Gold | Manon Petit | Snowboarding | Girls' snowboard cross | 15 February |
| Silver | Lou Barin | Freestyle skiing | Girls' slopestyle | 19 February |
| Bronze | Laura Chamiot Maitral | Cross-country skiing | Girls' cross-country cross | 13 February |
| Bronze | Lou Jeanmonnot-Laurent | Biathlon | Girls' pursuit | 15 February |
| Bronze | Agathe Bessard | Skeleton | Girls | 19 February |

=== Medalists in mixed NOCs events ===
| Medal | Name | Sport | Event | Date |
|---|---|---|---|---|
| Gold | Quentin Fercoq | Short track | Mixed team relay | 20 February |
| Silver | Julia Wagret; Mathieu Couyras | Figure skating | Team trophy | 20 February |

== Alpine skiing ==
Boys

| Athlete | Event | Run 1 | | Run 2 | | Total | |
| Athlete | Event | Time | Rank | Time | Rank | Time | Rank |
|---|---|---|---|---|---|---|---|
| Leo Anguenot | Slalom | 51.67 | 16 | 51.58 | 17 | 1:43.25 | 15 |
| Leo Anguenot | Giant slalom | 1:19.73 | 11 | did not finish | | | |
| Leo Anguenot | Super-G | —N/a | | | | 1:12.67 | 18 |
| Leo Anguenot | Combined | 1:14.07 | 24 | did not finish | | | |
| Ken Caillot | Slalom | 51.71 | 17 | 50.96 | 13 | 1:42.67 | 12 |
| Ken Caillot | Giant slalom | 1:22.02 | 25 | 1:20.97 | 22 | 2:42.99 | 20 |
| Ken Caillot | Super-G | —N/a | | | | 1:12.03 | 11 |
| Ken Caillot | Combined | 1:13.26 | 13 | 41.71 | 6 | 1:54.97 | 9 |

Girls

| Athlete | Event | Run 1 | | Run 2 | | Total | |
| Athlete | Event | Time | Rank | Time | Rank | Time | Rank |
|---|---|---|---|---|---|---|---|
| Camille Cerutti | Slalom | DNF | | did not advance | | | |
| Camille Cerutti | Giant slalom | 1:25.14 | 24 | 1:19.00 | 16 | 2:44.14 | 19 |
| Camille Cerutti | Super-G | —N/a | | | | DNF | |
| Camille Cerutti | Combined | 1:15.25 | 9 | 44.87 | 11 | 2:00.12 | 6 |
| Kenza Lacheb | Slalom | 56.90 | 10 | 52.59 | 12 | 1:49.49 | 11 |
| Kenza Lacheb | Giant slalom | 1:23.87 | 20 | 1:19.56 | 18 | 2:43.43 | 17 |
| Kenza Lacheb | Super-G | —N/a | | | | 1:14.73 | 12 |
| Kenza Lacheb | Combined | 1:14.40 | 5 | did not finish | | | |

Parallel mixed team

| Athletes | Event | Round of 16 | Quarterfinals | Semifinals | Final / BM | |
| Athletes | Event | Opposition Score | Opposition Score | Opposition Score | Opposition Score | Rank |
|---|---|---|---|---|---|---|
| Kenza Lacheb; Leo Anguenot | Parallel mixed team | Finland; L 1 – 3 | did not advance | | | |

== Biathlon ==
Boys

| Athlete | Event | Time | Misses | Rank |
|---|---|---|---|---|
| Emilien Claude | Sprint | 19:01.5 | 0 | 1st place, gold medalist(s) |
| Emilien Claude | Pursuit | 30:29.3 | 6 | 5 |
| Pierre Monney | Sprint | 21:01.9 | 3 | 23 |
| Pierre Monney | Pursuit | 33:31.0 | 8 | 29 |

Girls

| Athlete | Event | Time | Misses | Rank |
|---|---|---|---|---|
| Gilonne Guigonnat | Sprint | 19:02.6 | 3 | 8 |
| Gilonne Guigonnat | Pursuit | 27:14.0 | 7 | 13 |
| Lou Jeanmonnot-Laurent | Sprint | 18:52.6 | 1 | 5 |
| Lou Jeanmonnot-Laurent | Pursuit | 25:20.5 | 2 | 3rd place, bronze medalist(s) |

Mixed

| Athletes | Event | Time | Misses | Rank |
|---|---|---|---|---|
| Lou Jeanmonnot-Laurent; Emilien Claude | Single mixed relay | 41:50.3 | 3+8 | 4 |
| Lou Jeanmonnot-Laurent; Gilonne Guigonnat; Pierre Monney; Emilien Claude | Mixed relay | 1:20:36.4 | 1+14 | 4 |

== Cross-country skiing ==
Boys

| Athlete | Event | Qualification | | Quarterfinal | | Semifinal | | Final | |
| Athlete | Event | Time | Rank | Time | Rank | Time | Rank | Time | Rank |
|---|---|---|---|---|---|---|---|---|---|
| Camille Laude | 10 km freestyle | —N/a | | | | | | 25:58.9 | 23 |
| Camille Laude | Classical sprint | 2:58.50 | 5 Q | 2:59.04 | 2 Q | 2:57.85 | 3 q | 2:59.87 | 4 |
| Camille Laude | Cross-country cross | 3:04.33 | 2 Q | —N/a | | 3:05.84 | 1 Q | 3:06.97 | 6 |
| Jérémy Royer | 10 km freestyle | —N/a | | | | | | 25:32.2 | 13 |
| Jérémy Royer | Classical sprint | 3:12.51 | 26 Q | 3:29.62 | 6 | did not advance | | | |
| Jérémy Royer | Cross-country cross | 3:15.52 | 16 Q | —N/a | | 3:12.25 | 6 | did not advance | |

Girls

| Athlete | Event | Qualification | | Quarterfinal | | Semifinal | | Final | |
| Athlete | Event | Time | Rank | Time | Rank | Time | Rank | Time | Rank |
|---|---|---|---|---|---|---|---|---|---|
| Laura Chamiot Maitral | 5 km freestyle | —N/a | | | | | | 13:40.0 | 5 |
| Laura Chamiot Maitral | Classical sprint | 3:35.51 | 7 Q | 3:31.43 | 2 Q | 3:25.56 | 3 q | 3:28.39 | 5 |
| Laura Chamiot Maitral | Cross-country cross | 3:33.69 | 3 Q | —N/a | | 3:36.21 | 1 Q | 3:29.56 | 3rd place, bronze medalist(s) |
| Juliette Ducordeau | 5 km freestyle | —N/a | | | | | | 13:50.4 | 8 |
| Juliette Ducordeau | Classical sprint | 3:40.36 | 18 Q | 3:36.48 | 4 | did not advance | | | |
| Juliette Ducordeau | Cross-country cross | 3:40.31 | 7 Q | —N/a | | 3:39.93 | 4 | did not advance | |

== Figure skating ==
Singles

| Athlete | Event | SP | | FS | | Total | |
| Athlete | Event | Points | Rank | Points | Rank | Points | Rank |
|---|---|---|---|---|---|---|---|
| Adam Siao Him Fa | Boys' singles | 49.19 | 8 | 101.46 | 10 | 150.65 | 10 |

Couples

| Athletes | Event | SP/SD | | FS/FD | | Total | |
| Athletes | Event | Points | Rank | Points | Rank | Points | Rank |
|---|---|---|---|---|---|---|---|
| Julia Wagret; Mathieu Couyras | Ice dancing | 44.50 | 8 | 61.14 | 7 | 105.64 | 8 |

Mixed NOC team trophy

| Athletes | Event | Free skate/Free dance | | | | | |
| Athletes | Event | Ice dance | Pairs | Girls | Boys | Total | |
| Athletes | Event | Points Team points | Points Team points | Points Team points | Points Team points | Points | Rank |
|---|---|---|---|---|---|---|---|
| Team Determination; Francesca Righi / Pietro Papetti (ITA); Alina Ustimkina / Nikita Volodin (RUS); Annika Hocke (GER); Adam Siao Him Fa (FRA) | Team trophy | 53.70; 1 | 100.98; 6 | 82.41; 3 | 97.80; 4 | 14 | 8 |
| Team Future; Julia Wagret / Mathieu Couyras (FRA); Anna Duskova / Martin Bidar (CZE); Diana Nikitina (LAT); Ivan Shmuratko (UKR) | Team trophy | 63.06; 3 | 103.91; 7 | 107.47; 7 | 89.66; 3 | 20 | 2nd place, silver medalist(s) |

== Freestyle skiing ==
Ski cross

| Athlete | Event | Qualification | | Group heats | | Semifinal | Final |
| Athlete | Event | Time | Rank | Points | Rank | Position | Position |
|---|---|---|---|---|---|---|---|
| Matteo Lucatelli | Boys' ski cross | 44.65 | 10 Q | 14 | 7 Q | 2 FA | 4 |
| Margot Tresal Mauroz | Girls' ski cross | 48.00 | 12 | 7 | 13 | did not advance | |

Slopestyle

| Athlete | Event | Final | | | |
| Athlete | Event | Run 1 | Run 2 | Best | Rank |
|---|---|---|---|---|---|
| Theo Collomb Patton | Boys' slopestyle | 45.80 | 73.20 | 73.20 | 9 |
| Lou Barin | Girls' slopestyle | 66.00 | 72.80 | 72.80 | 2nd place, silver medalist(s) |

== Ice hockey ==
| Athlete | Event | Qualification | | Final | |
| Athlete | Event | Points | Rank | Points | Rank |
|---|---|---|---|---|---|
| Antonin Plagnat | Boys' individual skills challenge | 9 | 11 | did not advance | |

== Luge ==
| Athlete | Event | Run 1 | | Run 2 | | Total | |
| Athlete | Event | Time | Rank | Time | Rank | Time | Rank |
|---|---|---|---|---|---|---|---|
| Adrien Maitre | Boys | 49.826 | 17 | 49.096 | 15 | 1:38.922 | 16 |
| Margot Boch | Girls | 57.674 | 20 | 53.913 | 14 | 1:51.587 | 17 |

== Nordic combined ==
Individual

| Athlete | Event | Ski jumping | | | | Cross-country | |
| Athlete | Event | Distance | Points | Rank | Deficit | Time | Rank |
|---|---|---|---|---|---|---|---|
| Lilian Vaxelaire | Normal hill/5 km | 95.0 | 120.7 | 4 | 0:44 | 14:41.3 | 10 |

Nordic mixed team

| Athlete | Event | Ski jumping | | | Cross-country | |
| Athlete | Event | Points | Rank | Deficit | Time | Rank |
|---|---|---|---|---|---|---|
| Romane Dieu; Lilian Vaxelaire; Jonathan Learoyd; Juliette Ducardeau; Jeremy Royer | Nordic mixed team | 330.8 | 7 | 1:00 | 27:48.1 | 6 |

== Skeleton ==
| Athlete | Event | Run 1 | | Run 2 | | Total | |
| Athlete | Event | Time | Rank | Time | Rank | Time | Rank |
|---|---|---|---|---|---|---|---|
| Agathe Bessard | Girls | 56.24 | 4 | 56.21 | 4 | 1:52.45 | 3rd place, bronze medalist(s) |

== Ski jumping ==
Individual

| Athlete | Event | First round | | | Final | | | Total | |
| Athlete | Event | Distance | Points | Rank | Distance | Points | Rank | Points | Rank |
|---|---|---|---|---|---|---|---|---|---|
| Jonathan Learoyd | Boys' normal hill | 96.5 | 117.5 | 7 | 92.0 | 114.3 | 3 | 231.8 | 5 |
| Romane Dieu | Girls' normal hill | 83.5 | 88.5 | 10 | 81.5 | 88.9 | 8 | 177.4 | 8 |

Team

| Athlete | Event | First round | | Final | | Total | |
| Athlete | Event | Points | Rank | Points | Rank | Points | Rank |
|---|---|---|---|---|---|---|---|
| Romane Dieu; Lilian Vaxelaire; Jonathan Learoyd | Team competition | 318.6 | 5 | 304.8 | 5 | 623.4 | 5 |

== Short track speed skating ==
Boys

| Athlete | Event | Quarterfinal | | Semifinal | | Final | |
| Athlete | Event | Time | Rank | Time | Rank | Time | Rank |
|---|---|---|---|---|---|---|---|
| Quentin Fercoq | 500 m | 42.404 | 2 SA/B | 42.997 | 4 FB | 43.032 | 6 |
| Quentin Fercoq | 1000 m | 1:29.474 | 1 SA/B | PEN | | did not advance | |

Mixed team relay

| Athlete | Event | Semifinal | | Final | |
| Athlete | Event | Time | Rank | Time | Rank |
|---|---|---|---|---|---|
| Team B Ane Farstad (NOR); Kim Ji-yoo (KOR); Stijn Desmet (BEL); Quentin Fercoq (FRA) | Mixed team relay | 4:16.206 | 2 FA | 4:14.413 | 1st place, gold medalist(s) |

Qualification Legend: FA=Final A (medal); FB=Final B (non-medal); FC=Final C (non-medal) SA/B=Semifinals A/B; PEN=Penalized

== Snowboarding ==
Halfpipe

| Athlete | Event | Final | | | | |
| Athlete | Event | Run 1 | Run 2 | Run 3 | Best | Rank |
|---|---|---|---|---|---|---|
| Thalie Larochaix | Girls' halfpipe | 45.25 | 26.50 | 44.75 | 45.25 | 11 |

Snowboard cross

| Athlete | Event | Qualification | | Group heats | | Semifinal | Final |
| Athlete | Event | Time | Rank | Points | Rank | Position | Position |
|---|---|---|---|---|---|---|---|
| Merlin Surget | Boys' snowboard cross | 49.23 | 6 Q | 13 | 7 Q | 4 FB | 8 |
| Manon Petit | Girls' snowboard cross | 49.26 | 1 Q | 20 | 1 Q | 1 FA | 1st place, gold medalist(s) |

Slopestyle

| Athlete | Event | Final | | | |
| Athlete | Event | Run 1 | Run 2 | Best | Rank |
|---|---|---|---|---|---|
| Enzo Valax | Boys' slopestyle | 31.75 | 57.25 | 57.25 | 12 |
| Thalie Larochaix | Girls' slopestyle | 57.75 | 65.50 | 65.50 | 7 |
| Chloe Sillieres | Girls' slopestyle | 41.00 | 79.00 | 79.00 | 4 |

Snowboard and ski cross relay

| Athlete | Event | Quarterfinal | Semifinal | Final |
| Athlete | Event | Position | Position | Position |
|---|---|---|---|---|
| Manon Petit (FRA); Margot Tresal Mauroz (FRA); Aras Arlauskas (LTU); Matteo Lucatelli (FRA) | Team snowboard ski cross | 2 Q | 3 FB | 7 |

Qualification legend: FA – Qualify to medal round; FB – Qualify to consolation round

== See also ==
- France at the 2016 Summer Olympics
