= Portugal at the 2016 Winter Youth Olympics =

- IOC code: POR
- NOC: Olympic Committee of Portugal
- Website: www.comiteolimpicoportugal.pt

in Lillehammer
- Competitors: 2 in 1 sport
- Medals: Gold 0 Silver 0 Bronze 0 Total 0

Winter Youth Olympics appearances
- 2012; 2016; 2020; 2024

Portugal competed at the 2016 Winter Youth Olympics in Lillehammer, Norway from 12 to 21 February 2016.

== Alpine skiing ==
Boys

Athlete	Event	Run 1		Run 2		Total	
Athlete	Event	Time	Rank	Time	Rank	Time	Rank
Andrea Bugnone	Slalom	54.53	31	53.34	26	1:47.87	27
Andrea Bugnone	Giant slalom	DNF		did not advance			
Andrea Bugnone	Super-G	—N/a				1:14.47	31
Andrea Bugnone	Combined	1:14.47	27	43.74	21	1:58.21	21

Girls

Athlete	Event	Run 1		Run 2		Total	
Athlete	Event	Time	Rank	Time	Rank	Time	Rank
Joana Lopes	Slalom	DNS		did not advance			
Joana Lopes	Giant slalom	1:42.50	41	1:40.44	35	3:22.94	35

== See also ==
- Portugal at the 2016 Summer Olympics
