= Austria at the 2016 Winter Youth Olympics =

- IOC code: AUT
- NOC: Austrian Olympic Committee
- Website: www.olympia.at

in Lillehammer
- Competitors: 35 in 12 sports
- Flag bearer: Marco Ladner
- Medals Ranked 12th: Gold 2 Silver 3 Bronze 5 Total 10

Winter Youth Olympics appearances (overview)
- 2012; 2016; 2020; 2024

Austria competed at the 2016 Winter Youth Olympics in Lillehammer, Norway from 12 to 21 February 2016.

== Medalists ==
Medal	Name	Sport	Event	Date
Gold	Nadine Fest	Alpine skiing	Girls' super-G	13 February
Gold	Manuel Traninger	Alpine skiing	Boys' slalom	19 February
Silver	Julia Scheib	Alpine skiing	Girls' super-G	13 February
Silver	Manuel Traninger	Alpine skiing	Boys' combined	14 February
Silver	Mercedes Schulte	Bobsleigh	Girls' monobob	20 February
Bronze	Manuel Traninger	Alpine skiing	Boys' super-G	13 February
Bronze	Lara Wolf	Freestyle skiing	Girls' halfpipe	14 February
Bronze	Madeleine Egle	Luge	Girls' singles	15 February
Bronze	Theresa Schafzahl	Ice hockey	Girls' individual skills challenge	16 February
Bronze	Julia Huber; Florian Dagn; Clemens Leitner	Ski jumping	Team competition	18 February

== Alpine skiing ==
Boys

Athlete	Event	Run 1		Run 2		Total	
Athlete	Event	Time	Rank	Time	Rank	Time	Rank
Moritz Opetnik	Slalom	51.03	8	50.08	4	1:41.11	6
Moritz Opetnik	Giant slalom	1:22.65	28	1:18.27	5	2:40.92	15
Moritz Opetnik	Super-G	—N/a				1:11.78	8
Moritz Opetnik	Combined	DNF		did not advance			
Manuel Traninger	Slalom	49.94	3	48.80	1	1:38.74	1st place, gold medalist(s)
Manuel Traninger	Giant slalom	1:18.98	5	1:17.62	1	2:36.60	4
Manuel Traninger	Super-G	—N/a				1:11.03	3rd place, bronze medalist(s)
Manuel Traninger	Combined	1:12.36	4	40.58	2	1:52.94	2nd place, silver medalist(s)

Girls

Athlete	Event	Run 1		Run 2		Total	
Athlete	Event	Time	Rank	Time	Rank	Time	Rank
Nadine Fest	Slalom	54.44	2	51.74	9	1:46.18	4
Nadine Fest	Giant slalom	1:20.50	11	1:15.72	6	2:36.22	8
Nadine Fest	Super-G	—N/a				1:11.93	1st place, gold medalist(s)
Nadine Fest	Combined	1:14.44	6	42.91	3	1:57.35	4
Julia Scheib	Slalom	DNS		did not advance			
Julia Scheib	Giant slalom	1:20.34	10	1:16.08	8	2:36.42	9
Julia Scheib	Super-G	—N/a				1:12.56	2nd place, silver medalist(s)
Julia Scheib	Combined	1:14.22	4	did not finish			

Parallel mixed team

Athletes	Event	Round of 16	Quarterfinals	Semifinals	Final / BM	
Athletes	Event	Opposition Score	Opposition Score	Opposition Score	Opposition Score	Rank
Nadine Fest; Manuel Traninger	Parallel mixed team	Japan; W 2^{+} - 2	Finland; L 2 - 2^{+}	did not advance		

== Biathlon ==
Boys

Athlete	Event	Time	Misses	Rank
Markus Ortner	Sprint	22:00.8	3	39
Markus Ortner	Pursuit	38:02.7	8	46
Dominic Unterweger	Sprint	21:45.2	2	34
Dominic Unterweger	Pursuit	31:57.4	0	19

Girls

Athlete	Event	Time	Misses	Rank
Marion Berger	Sprint	21:14.8	2	37
Marion Berger	Pursuit	31:41.4	5	40
Lea Woerter	Sprint	20:44.9	1	28
Lea Woerter	Pursuit	29:26.3	3	28

Mixed

Athletes	Event	Time	Misses	Rank
Lea Woerter; Dominic Unterweger	Single mixed relay	45:52.9	2+17	20
Marion Berger; Lea Woerter; Markus Ortner; Dominic Unterweger	Mixed relay	1:28:40.1	2+15	14

== Bobsleigh ==
Athlete	Event	Run 1		Run 2		Total	
Athlete	Event	Time	Rank	Time	Rank	Time	Rank
Leonhard Pichler	Boys	58.13	10	58.22	10	1:56.35	9
Mercedes Schulte	Girls	58.66	1	58.99	4	1:57.65	2nd place, silver medalist(s)

== Cross-country skiing ==
Boys

Athlete	Event	Qualification		Quarterfinal		Semifinal		Final	
Athlete	Event	Time	Rank	Time	Rank	Time	Rank	Time	Rank
Florian Schwentner	10 km freestyle	—N/a						25:56.2	22
Florian Schwentner	Classical sprint	3:12.58	27 Q	3:06.84	5	did not advance			
Florian Schwentner	Cross-country cross	3:12.81	11 Q	—N/a		3:09.24	3 q	3:16.48	9

Girls

Athlete	Event	Qualification		Quarterfinal		Semifinal		Final	
Athlete	Event	Time	Rank	Time	Rank	Time	Rank	Time	Rank
Anna Juppe	5 km freestyle	—N/a						14:58.7	26
Anna Juppe	Classical sprint	3:44.72	25 Q	3:54.56	6	did not advance			
Anna Juppe	Cross-country cross	3:49.03	19 Q	—N/a		3:46.11	7	did not advance	

== Freestyle skiing ==
Halfpipe

Athlete	Event	Final				
Athlete	Event	Run 1	Run 2	Run 3	Best	Rank
Marco Ladner	Boys' halfpipe	41.80	43.60	67.60	67.60	5
Lara Wolf	Girls' halfpipe	46.00	65.40	74.20	74.20	3rd place, bronze medalist(s)

Ski cross

Athlete	Event	Qualification		Group heats		Semifinal	Final
Athlete	Event	Time	Rank	Points	Rank	Position	Position
Marcel Illmaier	Boys' ski cross	44.26	6 Q	13	8 Q	3 FB	8
Martina Rainer	Girls' ski cross	47.34	8	12	10	did not advance	

Slopestyle

Athlete	Event	Final			
Athlete	Event	Run 1	Run 2	Best	Rank
Marco Ladner	Boys' slopestyle	51.40	14.20	51.40	15
Max Mall	Boys' slopestyle	67.80	78.00	78.00	7
Lara Wolf	Girls' slopestyle	61.40	62.80	62.80	4

== Ice hockey ==
Athlete	Event	Qualification		Final	
Athlete	Event	Points	Rank	Points	Rank
Benjamin Baumgartner	Boys' individual skills challenge	11	7 Q	10	7
Theresa Schafzahl	Girls' individual skills challenge	18	1 Q	13	3rd place, bronze medalist(s)

== Luge ==
Individual sleds

Athlete	Event	Run 1		Run 2		Total	
Athlete	Event	Time	Rank	Time	Rank	Time	Rank
Bastian Schulte	Boys	48.125	7	47.924	3	1:36.049	4
Madeleine Egle	Girls	53.165	2	53.102	4	1:46.267	3rd place, bronze medalist(s)
Juri Gatt; Jakob Schmid	Doubles	53.699	7	53.883	9	1:47.582	7

Mixed team relay

Athlete	Event	Girls		Boys		Doubles		Total	
Athlete	Event	Time	Rank	Time	Rank	Time	Rank	Time	Rank
Madeleine Egle; Bastian Schulte; Jakob Schmid; Juri Gatt	Team relay	57.176	4	57.948	6	1:02.286	12	2:57.410	9

== Nordic combined ==
Individual

Athlete	Event	Ski jumping				Cross-country	
Athlete	Event	Distance	Points	Rank	Deficit	Time	Rank
Florian Dagn	Normal hill/5 km	92.0	117.6	6	0:57	14:15.8	4

Nordic mixed team

Athlete	Event	Ski jumping			Cross-country	
Athlete	Event	Points	Rank	Deficit	Time	Rank
Julia Huber; Florian Dagn; Clemens Leitner; Anna Juppe; Florian Schwentner	Nordic mixed team	351.5	3	0:32	27:11.8	5

== Skeleton ==
Athlete	Event	Run 1		Run 2		Total	
Athlete	Event	Time	Rank	Time	Rank	Time	Rank
Samuel Maier	Boys	54.60	8	54.35	6	1:48.95	6
Martin Stampfer	Boys	54.73	10	54.85	9	1:49.58	10

== Ski jumping ==
Individual

Athlete	Event	First round			Final			Total	
Athlete	Event	Distance	Points	Rank	Distance	Points	Rank	Points	Rank
Clemens Leitner	Boys' normal hill	94.5	119.5	5	83.0	98.2	10	217.7	9
Julia Huber	Girls' normal hill	89.5	104.8	5	88.0	99.9	5	204.7	5

Team

Athlete	Event	First round		Final		Total	
Athlete	Event	Points	Rank	Points	Rank	Points	Rank
Julia Huber; Florian Dagn; Clemens Leitner	Team competition	340.0	2	326.7	3	666.7	3rd place, bronze medalist(s)

== Snowboarding ==
Halfpipe

Athlete	Event	Final				
Athlete	Event	Run 1	Run 2	Run 3	Best	Rank
Moritz Amsuess	Boys' halfpipe	51.00	26.00	45.50	51.00	12

Snowboard cross

Athlete	Event	Qualification		Group heats		Semifinal	Final
Athlete	Event	Time	Rank	Points	Rank	Position	Position
Marco Dornhofer	Boys' snowboard cross	49.71	8 Q	13	9	did not advance	
Pia Zerkhold	Girls' snowboard cross	52.27	6 Q	13	8 Q	3 FB	8

Slopestyle

Athlete	Event	Final			
Athlete	Event	Run 1	Run 2	Best	Rank
Moritz Amsuess	Boys' slopestyle	47.50	45.75	47.50	15
Simon Gschaider	Boys' slopestyle	36.25	82.75	82.75	6

Snowboard and ski cross relay

Athlete	Event	Quarterfinal	Semifinal	Final
Athlete	Event	Position	Position	Position
Pia Zerkhold; Martina Rainer; Marco Dornhofer; Marcel Illmaier	Team snowboard ski cross	2 Q	3 FB	5

Qualification legend: FA – Qualify to medal round; FB – Qualify to consolation round

== Speed skating ==
Boys

Athlete	Event	Race 1		Race 2		Final	
Athlete	Event	Time	Rank	Time	Rank	Time	Rank
Mathias Hauer	500 m	38.716	23	38.41	20	77.13	20
Mathias Hauer	1500 m	—N/a				1:56.77	15
Mathias Hauer	Mass start	—N/a				6:34.52	25

Girls

Athlete	Event	Race 1		Race 2		Final	
Athlete	Event	Time	Rank	Time	Rank	Time	Rank
Viola Feichtner	500 m	43.88	25	44.00	24	87.88	24
Viola Feichtner	1500 m	—N/a				2:10.44	13
Viola Feichtner	Mass start	—N/a				5:57.45	15
Viktoria Schinnerl	500 m	42.87	20	42.44	19	85.32	20
Viktoria Schinnerl	1500 m	—N/a				2:13.40	19
Viktoria Schinnerl	Mass start	—N/a				3 pts	5

Mixed team sprint

Athletes	Event	Final	
Athletes	Event	Time	Rank
Team 2 Mariya Gromova (KAZ); Han Mei (CHN); Mathias Hauer (AUT); Victor Rudenko (BLR)	Mixed team sprint	2:00.79	10
Team 3 Viola Feichtner (AUT); Li Huawei (CHN); Li Yanzhe (CHN); Kazuki Sakakibara (JPN)	Mixed team sprint	1:59.20	6
Team 7 Karolina Bosiek (POL); Viktoria Schinnerl (AUT); Louis Hollaar (NED); Jan Swiatek (POL)	Mixed team sprint	DNF	

== See also ==
- Austria at the 2016 Summer Olympics
