= India at the 2016 Winter Youth Olympics =

- IOC code: IND
- NOC: Indian Olympic Association
- Website: www.olympic.ind.in (in English)

in Lillehammer
- Competitors: 1 in 1 sport
- Medals: Gold 0 Silver 0 Bronze 0 Total 0

Winter Youth Olympics appearances (overview)
- 2012; 2016; 2020; 2024

India competed at the 2016 Winter Youth Olympics in Lillehammer, Norway from 12 to 21 February 2016.

== Alpine skiing ==
Boys

Athlete	Event	Run 1		Run 2		Total	
Athlete	Event	Time	Rank	Time	Rank	Time	Rank
Saurabh Saurabh	Slalom	DNF		did not advance			
Saurabh Saurabh	Giant slalom	DNF		did not advance			
Saurabh Saurabh	Super-G	—				DNS	
Saurabh Saurabh	Combined	DNS		did not advance			

== See also ==
- India at the 2016 Summer Olympics
