= Montenegro at the 2016 Winter Youth Olympics =

- IOC code: MNE
- NOC: Montenegrin Olympic Committee
- Website: www.cokcg.org

in Lillehammer
- Competitors: 2 in 1 sport
- Medals: Gold 0 Silver 0 Bronze 0 Total 0

Winter Youth Olympics appearances
- 2012; 2016; 2020; 2024

Montenegro competed at the 2016 Winter Youth Olympics in Lillehammer, Norway from 12 to 21 February 2016.

== Alpine skiing ==
Boys

| Athlete | Event | Run 1 | | Run 2 | | Total | |
| Athlete | Event | Time | Rank | Time | Rank | Time | Rank |
|---|---|---|---|---|---|---|---|
| Eldar Salihović | Slalom | DNF | | did not advance | | | |
| Eldar Salihović | Giant slalom | 1:27.36 | 39 | 1:29.33 | 34 | 2:56.69 | 33 |
| Eldar Salihović | Combined | DNF | | did not advance | | | |

Girls

| Athlete | Event | Run 1 | | Run 2 | | Total | |
| Athlete | Event | Time | Rank | Time | Rank | Time | Rank |
|---|---|---|---|---|---|---|---|
| Nadežda Milošević | Slalom | 1:06.84 | 31 | 59.72 | 25 | 2:06.56 | 26 |
| Nadežda Milošević | Giant slalom | 1:34.50 | 37 | did not finish | | | |

== See also ==
- Montenegro at the 2016 Summer Olympics
