= Israel at the 2016 Winter Youth Olympics =

- IOC code: ISR
- NOC: Olympic Committee of Israel
- Website: www.olympicsil.co.il (in Hebrew and English)

in Lillehammer
- Competitors: 2 in 2 sports
- Flag bearer: Itamar Biran
- Medals: Gold 0 Silver 0 Bronze 0 Total 0

Winter Youth Olympics appearances (overview)
- 2016; 2020; 2024

Israel competed at the 2016 Winter Youth Olympics in Lillehammer, Norway from 12 to 21 February 2016.

== Alpine skiing ==
Boys

Athlete	Event	Run 1		Run 2		Total	
Athlete	Event	Time	Rank	Time	Rank	Time	Rank
Itamar Biran	Slalom	55.15	32	DNF			
Itamar Biran	Giant slalom	DNF		did not advance			
Itamar Biran	Super-G	—N/a				1:15.58	38
Itamar Biran	Combined	1:15.23	32	43.87	22	1:59.10	23

== Figure skating ==
Singles

Athlete	Event	SP		FS		Total	
Athlete	Event	Points	Rank	Points	Rank	Points	Rank
Mark Gorodnitsky	Boys' singles	44.48	12	91.30	12	135.78	13

== See also ==
- Israel at the 2016 Summer Olympics
