= Kenya at the 2016 Winter Youth Olympics =

- IOC code: KEN
- NOC: National Olympic Committee of Kenya

in Lillehammer
- Competitors: 1 in 1 sport
- Medals: Gold 0 Silver 0 Bronze 0 Total 0

Winter Youth Olympics appearances
- 2012; 2016; 2020–2024

Kenya competed at the 2016 Winter Youth Olympics in Lillehammer, Norway from 12 to 21 February 2016.

== Alpine skiing ==
Kenya had qualified a one girl athlete.

Girls

Athlete	Event	Run 1		Run 2		Total	
Athlete	Event	Time	Rank	Time	Rank	Time	Rank
Sabrina Simader	Slalom	DNF		did not advance			
Sabrina Simader	Giant slalom	1:28.59	31	1:24.37	26	2:52.96	26
Sabrina Simader	Super-G	—				1:17.09	23
Sabrina Simader	Combined	1:18.67	24	47.47	20	2:06.14	20

== See also ==
- Kenya at the 2016 Summer Olympics
- Kenya at the 2018 Winter Olympics
