= Ireland at the 2016 Winter Youth Olympics =

- IOC code: IRL
- NOC: Olympic Council of Ireland
- Website: www.olympicsport.ie

in Lillehammer
- Competitors: 1 in 1 sport
- Medals: Gold 0 Silver 0 Bronze 0 Total 0

Winter Youth Olympics appearances
- 2012; 2016; 2020; 2024

Ireland competed at the 2016 Winter Youth Olympics in Lillehammer, Norway from 12 to 21 February 2016.

== Alpine skiing ==
Boys

Athlete	Event	Run 1		Run 2		Total	
Athlete	Event	Time	Rank	Time	Rank	Time	Rank
Phil Kelleher	Slalom	57.98	39	57.39	33	1:55.37	33
Phil Kelleher	Giant slalom	1:28.89	42	Did not finish			
Phil Kelleher	Super-G	—N/a				1:18.87	45
Phil Kelleher	Combined	1:17.60	39	48.67	29	2:06.27	29

== See also ==
- Ireland at the 2016 Summer Olympics
