= Macedonia at the 2016 Winter Youth Olympics =

- IOC code: MKD
- NOC: Macedonian Olympic Committee
- Website: www.mok.org.mk

in Lillehammer
- Competitors: 2 in 2 sports
- Medals: Gold 0 Silver 0 Bronze 0 Total 0

Winter Youth Olympics appearances
- 2012; 2016; 2020; 2024

Republic of Macedonia competed at the 2016 Winter Youth Olympics in Lillehammer, Norway from 12 to 21 February 2016.

== Alpine skiing ==
Boys

| Athlete | Event | Run 1 | | Run 2 | | Total | |
| Athlete | Event | Time | Rank | Time | Rank | Time | Rank |
|---|---|---|---|---|---|---|---|
| Luka Bozhinovski | Slalom | DNF | | did not advance | | | |
| Luka Bozhinovski | Giant slalom | 1:24.34 | 33 | did not finish | | | |
| Luka Bozhinovski | Super-G | — | | | | DNF | |
| Luka Bozhinovski | Combined | 1:15.35 | 33 | 45.81 | 25 | 2:01.16 | 24 |

== Cross-country skiing ==
Boys

| Athlete | Event | Qualification | | Quarterfinal | | Semifinal | | Final | |
| Athlete | Event | Time | Rank | Time | Rank | Time | Rank | Time | Rank |
|---|---|---|---|---|---|---|---|---|---|
| Stavre Jada | 10 km freestyle | — | | | | | | 26:46.4 | 34 |
| Stavre Jada | Classical sprint | 3:35.43 | 44 | did not advance | | | | | |
| Stavre Jada | Cross-country cross | 3:39.99 | 43 | — | | did not advance | | | |

== See also ==
- Macedonia at the 2016 Summer Olympics
