= Monaco at the 2016 Winter Youth Olympics =

- IOC code: MON
- NOC: Monaco Olympic Committee
- Website: www.comite-olympique.mc

in Lillehammer
- Competitors: 1 in 1 sport
- Medals: Gold 0 Silver 0 Bronze 0 Total 0

Winter Youth Olympics appearances
- 2012; 2016; 2020; 2024

Monaco competed at the 2016 Winter Youth Olympics in Lillehammer, Norway from 12 to 21 February 2016.

Prince Albert of Monaco attended Day 2 of the olympic games, Saturday 13 February, to support Monaco's one athlete.

== Alpine skiing ==
Boys

Athlete	Event	Run 1		Run 2		Total	
Athlete	Event	Time	Rank	Time	Rank	Time	Rank
Paul Croesi	Slalom	54.30	30	52.91	24	1:47.21	25
Paul Croesi	Giant slalom	DNF		did not advance			
Paul Croesi	Super-G	—				1:16.22	41
Paul Croesi	Combined	1:16.67	37	did not finish			

== See also ==
- Monaco at the 2016 Summer Olympics
