= Georgia at the 2016 Winter Youth Olympics =

- Flag of Georgia
- IOC code: GEO
- NOC: Georgian National Olympic Committee
- Website: www.geonoc.org.ge

in Lillehammer
- Competitors: 2 in 2 sports
- Medals: Gold 0 Silver 0 Bronze 0 Total 0

Winter Youth Olympics appearances
- 2012; 2016; 2020; 2024

Georgia competed at the 2016 Winter Youth Olympics in Lillehammer, Norway from 12 to 21 February 2016.

== Alpine skiing ==
Boys

Athlete	Event	Run 1		Run 2		Total	
Athlete	Event	Time	Rank	Time	Rank	Time	Rank
Besarion Japaridze	Slalom	55.40	33	54.87	28	1:50.27	28
Besarion Japaridze	Giant slalom	1:27.63	41	1:26.54	31	2:54.17	32
Besarion Japaridze	Combined	DNS		did not advance			

== Luge ==
Athlete	Event	Run 1		Run 2		Total	
Athlete	Event	Time	Rank	Time	Rank	Time	Rank
Lasha Peradze	Boys	48.721	10	48.786	13	1:37.507	11

== See also ==
- Georgia at the 2016 Summer Olympics
