= Argentina at the 2016 Winter Youth Olympics =

- IOC code: ARG
- NOC: Comité Olímpico Argentino
- Website: www.coarg.org.ar (in Spanish)

in Lillehammer
- Competitors: 9 in 7 sports
- Flag bearers: Francesca Baruzzi Farriol (opening); Verónica María Ravenna (closing)
- Medals: Gold 0 Silver 0 Bronze 0 Total 0

Winter Youth Olympics appearances (overview)
- 2012; 2016; 2020; 2024

Argentina competed at the 2016 Winter Youth Olympics in Lillehammer, Norway from 12 to 21 February 2016.

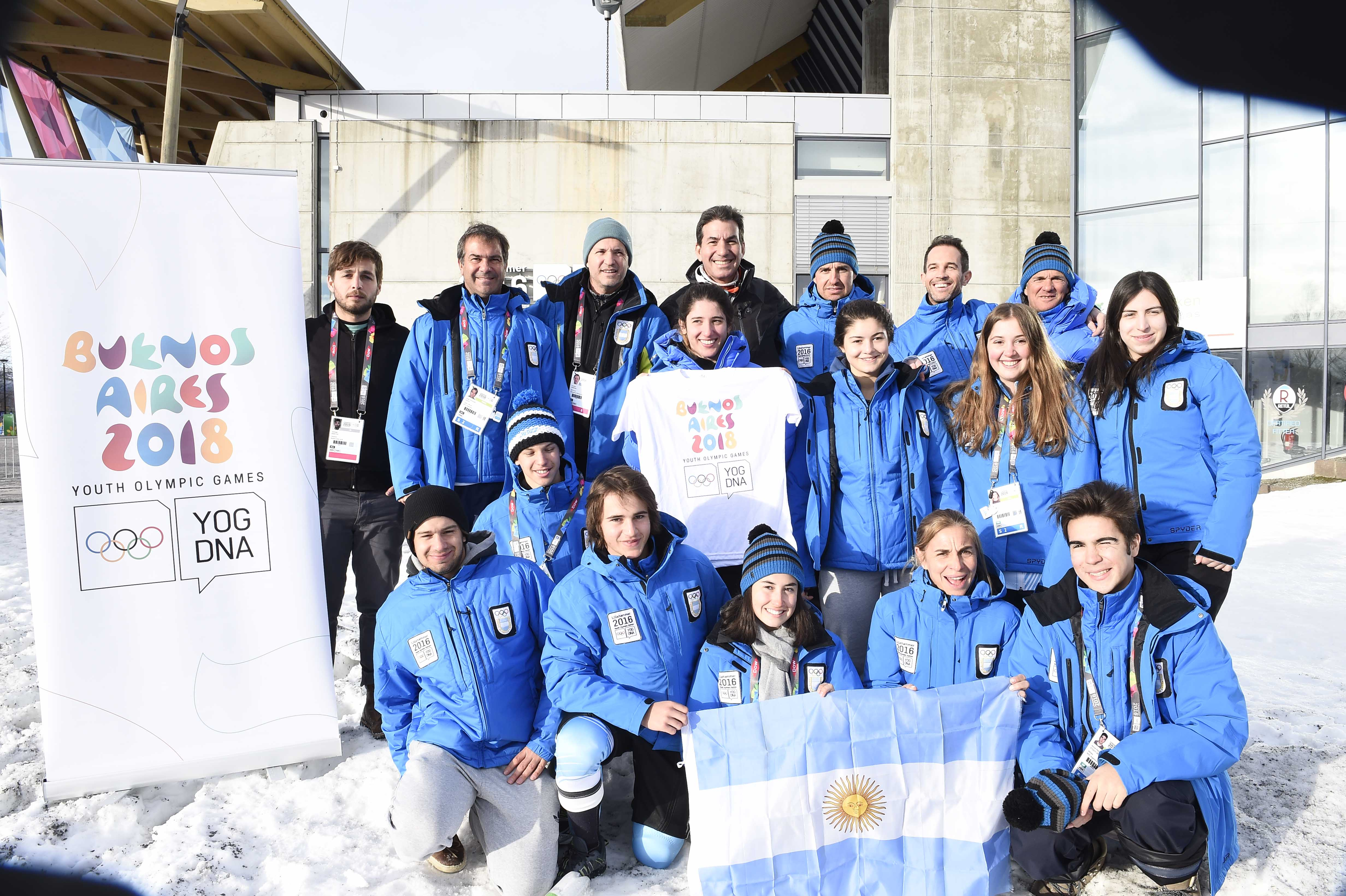
The Argentine delegation alongside members of the Buenos Aires Youth Olympic Games Organising Committee

== Alpine skiing ==
Boys

Athlete	Event	Run 1		Run 2		Total	
Athlete	Event	Time	Rank	Time	Rank	Time	Rank
Tomás Bacigalupo	Slalom	56.00	36	56.20	30	1:52.20	30
Tomás Bacigalupo	Giant slalom	1:27.45	40	1:26.69	32	2:54.14	31
Tomás Bacigalupo	Super-G	—N/a				1:17.29	42
Tomás Bacigalupo	Combined	1:17.90	40	48.03	28	2:05.93	28

Girls

Athlete	Event	Run 1		Run 2		Total	
Athlete	Event	Time	Rank	Time	Rank	Time	Rank
Francesca Baruzzi Farriol	Slalom	57.28	13	52.02	10	1:49.30	10
Francesca Baruzzi Farriol	Giant slalom	1:22.96	18	did not finish			
Francesca Baruzzi Farriol	Super-G	—N/a				1:18.34	28
Francesca Baruzzi Farriol	Combined	1:19.44	27	44.97	12	2:04.41	18

== Cross-country skiing ==
Boys

Athlete	Event	Qualification		Quarterfinal		Semifinal		Final	
Athlete	Event	Time	Rank	Time	Rank	Time	Rank	Time	Rank
Marco Dal Farra	10 km freestyle	—N/a						28:19.3	44
Marco Dal Farra	Classical sprint	3:33.20	42	did not advance					
Marco Dal Farra	Cross-country cross	3:27.85	36	—N/a		did not advance			

== Figure skating ==
Singles

Athlete	Event	SP		FS		Total	
Athlete	Event	Points	Rank	Points	Rank	Points	Rank
Mauro Calcagno	Boys' singles	23.92	16	55.58	16	79.50	16

== Freestyle skiing ==
Slopestyle

Athlete	Event	Final			
Athlete	Event	Run 1	Run 2	Best	Rank
Esmeralda Villalonga	Girls' slopestyle	55.40	52.60	55.40	7

== Ice hockey ==
Athlete	Event	Qualification		Final	
Athlete	Event	Points	Rank	Points	Rank
Iara Haiek	Girls' individual skills challenge	6	16	did not advance	

== Luge ==
Athlete	Event	Run 1		Run 2		Total	
Athlete	Event	Time	Rank	Time	Rank	Time	Rank
Verónica María Ravenna	Girls	53.511	6	53.405	8	1:46.916	7

== Snowboarding ==
Snowboard cross

Athlete	Event	Qualification		Group heats		Semifinal	Final
Athlete	Event	Time	Rank	Points	Rank	Position	Position
Aaron Stoeff Belkenoff	Boys' snowboard cross	51.75	15 Q	6	16	did not advance	
Delfina Lemann	Girls' snowboard cross	1:01.27	15 Q	6	14	did not advance	

Slopestyle

Athlete	Event	Final			
Athlete	Event	Run 1	Run 2	Best	Rank
Aaron Stoeff Belkenoff	Boys' slopestyle	25.75	20.00	25.75	22

== See also ==
- Argentina at the 2016 Summer Olympics
