= Hólmfríður Dóra Friðgeirsdóttir =

Icelandic alpine skier (born 1998)

Personal information
- Nationality: Icelandic
- Born: 8 January 1998 (age 28)

Sport
- Sport: Alpine skiing
- Event(s): Super-G; Giant Slalom; Slalom

Hólmfríður Dóra Friðgeirsdóttir (born 8 January 1998) is an Icelandic alpine skier.

She represented her nation at the 2016 Winter Youth Olympics and the 2022 Winter Olympics and. She broke her leg in December of 2025 and was unable to competete at the 2026 Olympics as a result.

Her partner is Dagur Benediktsson.

== Career ==
Hólmfríður Dóra competed at the 2015 European Youth Olympic Winter Festival and the 2016 Winter Youth Olympics. Two years later, she participated in the 2018 Junior World Championships in Davos. In 2019, she qualified for the 2019 Alpine World Ski Championships in Åre. There, she finished 49th in the giant slalom and did not finish in the slalom. Two years later, at the 2021 World Championships in Cortina d'Ampezzo, she achieved what was at the time her best result at a major international championship, placing 35th in the giant slalom.

At the 2022 Winter Olympics, she finished 38th in the women's slalom and 32nd in the women's super-G. She did not finish the women's giant slalom event.

On 8 December 2023, Hólmfríður Dóra made her World Cup debut in the super-G in St. Moritz, finishing 45th, which remains her best World Cup result to date. She missed the 2023 World Championships in Courchevel and Méribel due to injury.

Hólmfríður Dóra achieved the greatest success of her career to date in the South American Cup in 2025. She won the overall, downhill, and super-G standings without winning a single race.
