= Daryna Kyrychenko =

Ukrainian snowboarder (born 1998)

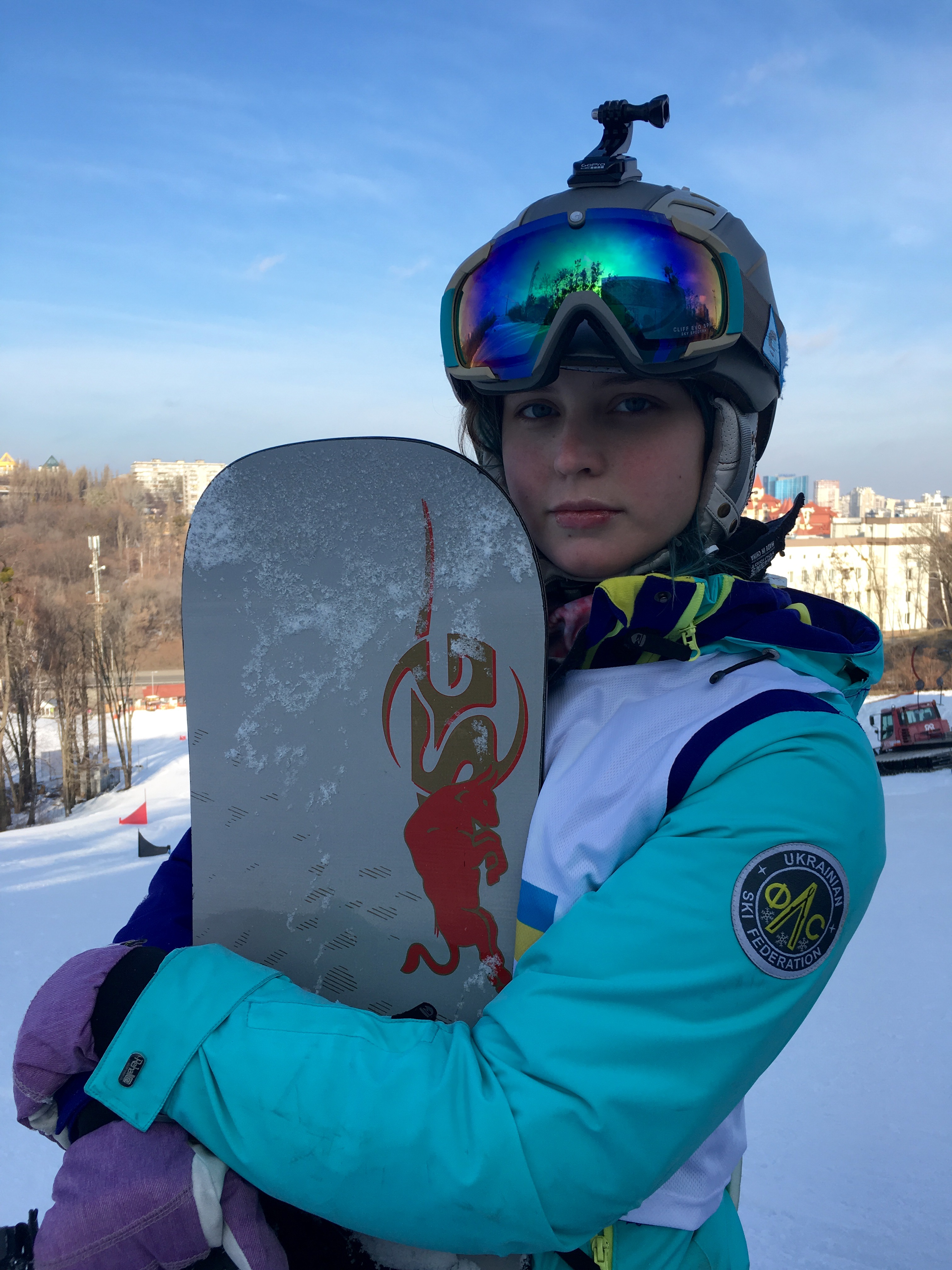

Personal information
- Born: 14 October 1998 (age 27) Kyiv, Ukraine
- Height: 170 cm (5 ft 7 in)

Sport
- Club: Youth Sport School Viktoria
Medal record
Women's snowboarding
Representing Ukraine
Winter Youth Olympics
Bronze medal – third place	2016 Lillehammer	Team snowboard ski cross

Daryna Kyrychenko (born 14 October 1998) is a Ukrainian snowboarder and Youth Olympics Bronze Medalist.

== 2016 Winter Youth Olympics ==
Kyrychenko represented Ukraine at the 2016 Winter Youth Olympics in Lillehammer, Norway, where she finished 12th in individual snowboard cross and won bronze in the team competition alongside two Swedish and one Bulgarian athlete.

== Performances ==
Level	Year	Event	SX	TSX
YOG	2016	Lillehammer, Norway	12	3
