= Sophie Hediger =

Swiss snowboarder (1998–2024)

Personal information
- Full name: Sophie Anna Hediger
- Nationality: Swiss
- Born: 14 December 1998 Horgen, Zurich, Switzerland
- Died: 23 December 2024 (aged 26) Arosa, Grisons, Switzerland

Sport
- Sport: Snowboarding
- Event: Snowboard cross
Medal record
Representing Switzerland
Winter Universiade
Gold medal – first place	2023 Lake Placid	Snowboard cross

Sophie Anna Hediger (14 December 1998 – 23 December 2024) was a Swiss snowboarder. She competed in the 2022 Winter Olympics in Beijing, in women's snowboard cross, and in the mixed team snowboard cross.

== Career ==
Hediger competed at the 2018–19 FIS Snowboard World Cup, 2019–20 FIS Snowboard World Cup, 2020–21 FIS Snowboard World Cup, and 2021–22 FIS Snowboard World Cup.

== Death ==
Hediger died in an avalanche at Arosa Lenzerheide, on 23 December 2024, at the age of 26. It was reported that she and an acquaintance were on the Black Diamond slope that was closed at the time due to avalanche risks.
