= Chile at the 2016 Winter Youth Olympics =

- IOC code: CHI
- NOC: Chilean Olympic Committee
- Website: www.coc.org.co (in Spanish)

in Lillehammer
- Competitors: 8 in 4 sports
- Medals: Gold 0 Silver 0 Bronze 0 Total 0

Winter Youth Olympics appearances
- 2012; 2016; 2020; 2024

Chile competed at the 2016 Winter Youth Olympics in Lillehammer, Norway from 12 to 21 February 2016.

== Alpine skiing ==
Boys

Athlete	Event	Run 1		Run 2		Total	
Athlete	Event	Time	Rank	Time	Rank	Time	Rank
Kai Horwitz	Slalom	52.25	21	51.87	19	1:44.12	17
Kai Horwitz	Giant slalom	1:21.07	20	1:20.60	16	2:41.67	16
Kai Horwitz	Super-G	—N/a				1:13.34	24
Kai Horwitz	Combined	1:13.35	16	44.26	23	1:57.61	20

Girls

Athlete	Event	Run 1		Run 2		Total	
Athlete	Event	Time	Rank	Time	Rank	Time	Rank
Magdalena Pfingsthorn	Slalom	1:05.39	30	1:00.19	26	2:05.58	25
Magdalena Pfingsthorn	Giant slalom	1:28.02	30	1:25.83	27	2:53.85	27

== Cross-country skiing ==
Boys

Athlete	Event	Qualification		Semifinal		Final	
Athlete	Event	Time	Rank	Time	Rank	Time	Rank
Elias Gonzalez	10 km freestyle	—N/a				35:13.7	49
Elias Gonzalez	Cross-country cross	4:27.47	50	did not advance			

== Freestyle skiing ==
Ski cross

Athlete	Event	Qualification		Group heats		Semifinal	Final
Athlete	Event	Time	Rank	Points	Rank	Position	Position
Roberto Negrin	Boys' ski cross	44.74	12 Q	7	15	did not advance	
Magdalena Casas Cordero	Girls' ski cross	48.22	13	10	12	did not advance	

Slopestyle

Athlete	Event	Final			
Athlete	Event	Run 1	Run 2	Best	Rank
Benjamin Garces	Boys' slopestyle	20.00	52.60	52.60	14

== Snowboarding ==
Snowboard cross

Athlete	Event	Qualification		Group heats		Semifinal	Final
Athlete	Event	Time	Rank	Points	Rank	Position	Position
Antonia Yanez	Girls' snowboard cross	54.21	10 Q	14	7 Q	3 FB	7

Slopestyle

Athlete	Event	Final			
Athlete	Event	Run 1	Run 2	Best	Rank
Antonia Yanez	Girls' slopestyle	26.25	61.75	61.75	10

== See also ==
- Chile at the 2016 Summer Olympics
