= Anna Lotta Jõgeva =

Estonian alpine skier (born 1999)

Personal information
- Born: 4 July 1999 (age 25); Tallinn

Sport
- Country: Estonia

Anna Lotta Jõgeva (born 4 July 1999) is an Estonian alpine skier. She represented Estonia at the 2018 Winter Olympics.
