= Katie Parker (skier) =

Australian freestyle skier (born 1998)

Personal information
- Full name: Kathryn Parker
- Nationality: Australia
- Born: 28 April 1998 (age 28) Melbourne, Victoria, Australia

Sport
- Sport: Skiing

Kathryn Parker (born 28 April 1998) is a former Australian alpine skier who competed in the women's slalom event at the 2022 Winter Olympics. She also competed at the 2016 Winter Youth Olympics and spent three years as a member of the University of Utah's alpine team, the Utah Utes. She retired from alpine skiing in 2023.

Parker was born in Melbourne, Victoria. She began skiing at the age of four.
