= Tereza Jančová =

Slovak alpine skier (born 1999)

Personal information
- Born: 31 March 1999 (age 27) Zvolen, Slovakia

Sport
- Country: Slovakia
- Sport: Alpine skiing
- Club: LK Levoča
Medal record
Alpine skiing
Representing Slovakia
World Championships
| Silver medal – second place | 2017 St. Moritz | Team event |

Tereza Jančová (born 31 March 1999) is a Slovak former alpine skier. She competed for Slovakia at the FIS Alpine World Ski Championships 2017, winning silver in the team event. Jančová was named 'most successful athlete in Zvolen' in 2017, and was also named as the winner in the junior category in 2019. She announced her retirement in March 2019, after having won the Slovak championship slalom event the same month.

She is the older sister of the Olympic alpine skier Rebeka Jančová.
