= Jonna Luthman =

Swedish alpine skier

Personal information
- Born: 15 October 1998 (age 27)

Skiing career
- Sport: Alpine skiing
- Club: Åre SLK
- Disciplines: Giant slalom, slalom, combined, downhill, super-G
- World Cup debut: 26 October 2019 (age 21)

World Championships
- Teams: 1 – (2021)
- Medals: 1 (0 gold)

World Cup
- Seasons: 3 – (2020–2022)
- Wins: 0
- Podiums: 0
- Overall titles: 0
- Discipline titles: 0
Medal record
Women's alpine skiing
Representing Sweden
World Championships
Silver medal – second place	2021 Cortina d’Ampezzo	Team event

Jonna Luthman (born 15 October 1998) is a Swedish former World Cup alpine ski racer.

She represented Sweden at the FIS Alpine World Ski Championships 2021, and was part of the Swedish team that earned a silver medal in the combined men's and women's team competition.

She announced her retirement from professional skiing on 23 January 2023.
