= Anton Grammel =

German alpine skier (born 1998)

Personal information
- Born: 24 July 1998 (age 28) Friedrichshafen, Baden‑Württemberg, Germany
- Home town: Kressbronn am Bodensee, Baden‑Württemberg, Germany
- Height: 178 cm (5 ft 10 in)

Skiing career
- Country: Germany
- Sport: Alpine skiing
- Club: Skiclub Kressbronn
- Disciplines: Giant slalom, super-G
- World Cup debut: 12 March 2022 (age 23)

Olympics
- Teams: 1 – (2026)
- Medals: 0

World Championships
- Teams: 1 – (2025)
- Medals: 0

World Cup
- Seasons: 5 – (2022–2026)
- Podiums: 0
- Overall titles: 0 – (54th in 2026)
- Discipline titles: 0 – (17th in GS, 2026)
Medal record
Men's alpine skiing
Representing Germany
Youth Olympic Games
Bronze medal – third place	2016 Lillehammer	Giant slalom

Anton Grammel (born 24 July 1998) is a German World Cup alpine ski racer, competing in the disciplines of giant slalom and super-G. He represented Germany at the 2025 World Championships and 2026 Winter Olympics and won a bronze medal in the giant slalom event at the 2016 Winter Youth Olympics 2016.

== Early life ==
Grammel was born in Friedrichshafen, Baden‑Württemberg, and grew up in Kressbronn am Bodensee on the shores of Lake Constance in southern Germany. His father introduced him to skiing and served as his coach when he started racing with the Kessbronn ski club. As a teenager, he moved to Oberstdorf to attend Gertrud-von-le-Fort-Gymnasium Oberstdorf, a ski boarding school. He joined the Bundeswehr (German Armed Forces) after graduating in 2018.

== Career ==
Grammel started entering FIS races in 2014 at age sixteen and competed in the 2016 Winter Youth Olympics in Lillehammer, Norway, taking a bronze medal in the giant slalom. He joined the German ski team for the 2016–17 season and made his Europa Cup debut in February 2017. He was selected for the German squad at the Junior World Championships in 2018 and 2019, where his best result was 12th place in the alpine combined in 2018.

Grammel's World Cup debut came in March 2022 in a giant slalom at Kranjska Gora, Slovenia, after attaining podium finishes on the Europa and Nor-Am Cups earlier in the season. He made the cut for a second run in his initial race, but missed a gate during the second run for a disqualification. The next day in another giant slalom at the same location, he again qualified for the second run and this time completed it for a 26th-place finish and his first World Cup points.

The next two seasons saw limited success on the World Cup tour, with Grammel gaining points in two of nine starts both years and finishing no better than 21st place.

Results began to improve during the 2024–25 season. Grammel finished a then-career-best 11th at Alta Badia in December and followed that with a 16th place the next month in Adelboden. This was enough to qualify for the 2025 World Championships in Saalbach, Austria, where he finished in 12th place in the giant slalom. He took 10th place in both of his final World Cup starts that season (including his first World Cup final at Sun Valley), ending at 21st place in the season's giant slalom standings. Grammel capped off the winter by winning the giant slalom title at the German National Championships.

The 2025–26 season kicked off at Sölden, Austria, with qualification for the 2026 Winter Olympics in February at stake. Grammel topped the German contingent in the season opener with an 11th-place result to secure half the qualifying standard needed to make the German Olympic team, and in January the German Olympic Sports Confederation announced that he had indeed made the team. In the final World Cup giant slalom before the Olympics in Schladming, Grammel notched another top ten after recording the sixth-fastest first run. At the Milano Cortina Games (with the men's events held in Bormio), Grammel finished 29th in the super-G and 15th in the giant slalom. Grammel set a new personal best in the first World Cup giant slalom after the Olympics, with an 8th place at Kranjska Gora, and also secured a spot at the World Cup finals in Hafjell. At the finals, he improved his personal best by finishing in 7th place in the giant slalom event.

== World Cup results ==
=== Season standings ===
Season
Season	Age	Overall	Slalom	Giant slalom	Super-G	Downhill
2022	24	150	—	55	—	—
2023	24	129	—	46	—	—
2024	25	120	—	43	—	—
2025	26	67	—	21	—	—
2026	27	54	—	17	—	—

=== Top-ten results ===
- 0 podiums, 5 top tens

Season
Season	Date	Location	Discipline	Place
2025	15 March 2025	Hafjell, Norway	Giant slalom	10th
2025	26 March 2025	Sun Valley, United States	Giant slalom	10th
2026	27 January 2026	Schladming, Austria	Giant slalom	10th
2026	7 March 2026	Kranjska Gora, Slovenia	Giant slalom	8th
2026	24 March 2026	Hafjell, Norway	Giant slalom	7th

== World Championship results ==
Year
Year	Age	Slalom	Giant slalom	Super-G	Downhill	Team combined	Team event
2025	26	—	12	—	—	—	—

== Olympic results ==
Year
Year	Age	Slalom	Giant slalom	Super-G	Downhill	Team combined
2026	27	—	15	29	—	—
