= Anastasiia Silanteva =

Russian skier (born 1998)

Personal information
- Nationality: Russian
- Born: 27 August 1998 (age 27)

Sport
- Sport: Alpine skiing

Anastasiia Sergeyevna Silanteva (Russian: Анастасия Сергеевна Силантьева, born 27 August 1998) is a Russian alpine skier. She competed in the women's giant slalom at the 2018 Winter Olympics.
