= Hafjell =

Ski resort in Norway

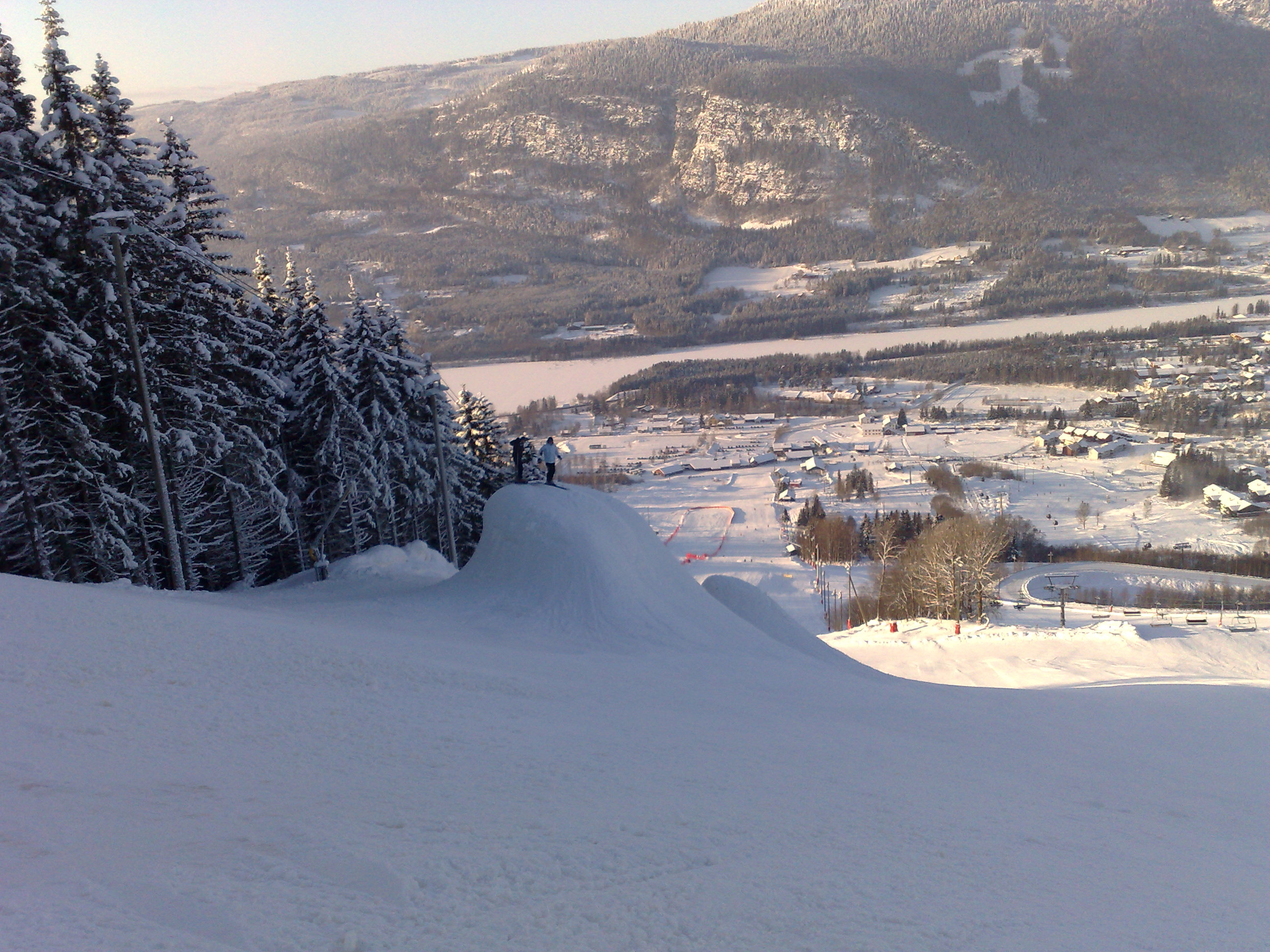
- Hafjell in January 2010
- Interactive map of Hafjell
- Location: Øyer Municipality, Innlandet, Norway
- Nearest city: Lillehammer
- Coordinates: 61°14′32″N 10°26′31″E
- Vertical: 830 m (2,723 ft)
- Top elevation: 1,030 m (3,379 ft)
- Base elevation: 200 m (656 ft)
- Website: Hafjell.no

Hafjell is a village and a ski resort in Norway, in the Øyer Municipality in Innlandet county.

Hafjell hosted the alpine skiing events (giant slalom and slalom) at the 1994 Winter Olympics; the speed events were held at Kvitfjell, a regular stop on the World Cup tour for men's speed events in March. Hafjell occasionally hosts World Cup slalom and giant slalom races, last in 2006 (women) and 1996 (men's and women's finals).

== Hafjell Bike Park ==
Hafjell Bike Park is renowned as the best bike park for downhill riding in Norway and some of the trails having vertical drops of 830 m. These vary in difficulty with jumps and drops for the ”nut balls”, along with easier lines for beginners.

Since its early inception in 2001, Hafjell Bike Park has become known as a world class bike park. It started with the “Wednesday Club” - a group of local riders doing shuttle runs in the area who soon became tired of blasting down the Hafjell fire-roads and craved more demanding trails. In February 2002, a meeting between Snorre Pedersen and the manager of Hafjell Alpine Centre, Geir Olsen took place, resulting in support from Hafjell Alpine Centre, ending the illegal trail building.

Snorre Pedersen is the architect of the park, and is described as a magician with bike trails. In 2003 he became a pioneer, digging and constructing the NC-trail, together with the help of volunteers who put hundreds of hours of manual labour in. Hafjell hosted the National Downhill race in 2004 on this first trail. This was the start of the designing and transforming of the hills of Hafjell, turning it into a true paradise for the downhill enthusiasts.

Altogether 14 trails are now carved into the wooded alpine landscape. Hafjell now has amenities for all types of riding, from downhill and trail riding to cross-country. There is access to a gondola and other lifts for better access to the ski resort.

== The name ==
The park was known as "Avfjellet" until 1930. The first element is av 'off', the last element is fjell 'mountain'. The meaning is 'the mountain broken off a larger mountain' (the top of Hafjell lies beneath the larger and taller mountain Nevelfjell, and is considered to be a part of this). The first element was pronounced just as [a:], and the h was later added (see h-adding) to emphasize it.

== Events ==
The venue hosted the Alpine skiing events during the 2016 Winter Youth Olympics.
