= Finland at the 2016 Winter Youth Olympics =

- IOC code: FIN
- NOC: Finnish Olympic Committee
- Website: www.noc.fi

in Lillehammer
- Competitors: 42 in 10 sports
- Medals Ranked 21st: Gold 0 Silver 1 Bronze 5 Total 6

Winter Youth Olympics appearances
- 2012; 2016; 2020; 2024

Finland competed at the 2016 Winter Youth Olympics in Lillehammer, Norway from 12 to 21 February 2016.

== Medalists ==
Medal	Name	Sport	Event	Date
Silver	Elli Pikkujamsa	Snowboarding	Girls' slopestyle	19 February
Bronze	Lauri Mannila	Cross-country skiing	Boys' cross-country cross	13 February
Bronze	Rebecca Immonen	Cross-country skiing	Girls' 5 km	18 February
Bronze	Henna Ikola	Snowboarding	Girls' slopestyle	19 February
Bronze	Rene Rinnekangas	Snowboarding	Boys' slopestyle	19 February
Bronze	Riikka Honkanen	Alpine skiing	Parallel mixed team	20 February
Bronze	Sampo Kankkunen	Alpine skiing	Parallel mixed team	20 February

== Alpine skiing ==
Boys

Athlete	Event	Run 1		Run 2		Total	
Athlete	Event	Time	Rank	Time	Rank	Time	Rank
Sampo Kankkunen	Slalom	51.08	10	50.95	12	1:42.03	10
Sampo Kankkunen	Giant slalom	1:19.18	6	1:19.36	9	2:38.54	6
Sampo Kankkunen	Super-G	—N/a				1:11.04	4
Sampo Kankkunen	Combined	1:12.27	3	41.93	9	1:54.20	5

Girls

Athlete	Event	Run 1		Run 2		Total	
Athlete	Event	Time	Rank	Time	Rank	Time	Rank
Riikka Honkanen	Slalom	55.29	6	51.49	7	1:46.78	7
Riikka Honkanen	Giant slalom	1:20.55	12	1:16.24	10	2:36.79	11

Parallel mixed team

Athletes	Event	Round of 16	Quarterfinals	Semifinals	Final / BM	
Athletes	Event	Opposition Score	Opposition Score	Opposition Score	Opposition Score	Rank
Riikka Honkanen; Sampo Kankkunen	Parallel mixed team	France; W 3 – 1	Austria; W 2^{+} – 2	Germany; L 2 – 2^{+}	Canada; W 3 – 1	3rd place, bronze medalist(s)

== Biathlon ==
Boys

Athlete	Event	Time	Misses	Rank
Tuomas Harjula	Sprint	20:07.7	2	11
Tuomas Harjula	Pursuit	30:44.5	4	7
Otto-Eemil Karvinen	Sprint	20:54.2	2	20
Otto-Eemil Karvinen	Pursuit	32:51.7	6	26

Girls

Athlete	Event	Time	Misses	Rank
Jenni Keranen	Sprint	19:30.3	1	13
Jenni Keranen	Pursuit	27:03.8	2	11
Saana Lahdelma	Sprint	20:56.5	4	32
Saana Lahdelma	Pursuit	30:24.2	5	33

Mixed

Athletes	Event	Time	Misses	Rank
Jenni Keranen; Tuomas Harjula	Single mixed relay	43:12.7	1+15	10
Jenni Keranen; Saana Lahdelma; Tuomas Harjula; Otto-Eemil Karvinen	Mixed relay	did not finish		

== Cross-country skiing ==
Boys

Athlete	Event	Qualification		Quarterfinal		Semifinal		Final	
Athlete	Event	Time	Rank	Time	Rank	Time	Rank	Time	Rank
Remi Lindholm	10 km freestyle	—N/a						24:48.3	7
Remi Lindholm	Classical sprint	3:07.56	15 Q	3:02.32	3 q	3:03.08	5	did not advance	
Remi Lindholm	Cross-country cross	3:11.06	7 Q	—N/a		3:08.23	4 q	3:07.88	7
Lauri Mannila	10 km freestyle	—N/a						25:27.7	12
Lauri Mannila	Classical sprint	2:56.12	1 Q	3:01.70	1 Q	2:55.79	3 q	3:00.96	5
Lauri Mannila	Cross-country cross	3:06.26	5 Q	—N/a		3:08.33	2 Q	3:01.84	3rd place, bronze medalist(s)

Girls

Athlete	Event	Qualification		Quarterfinal		Semifinal		Final	
Athlete	Event	Time	Rank	Time	Rank	Time	Rank	Time	Rank
Rebecca Immonen	5 km freestyle	—N/a						13:35.9	3rd place, bronze medalist(s)
Rebecca Immonen	Classical sprint	3:32.26	4 Q	3:30.55	1 Q	3:29.49	4	did not advance	
Rebecca Immonen	Cross-country cross	3:44.48	11 Q	—N/a		3:34.97	3 q	3:37.38	7
Roosa Niemi	5 km freestyle	—N/a						13:55.2	10
Roosa Niemi	Classical sprint	3:39.89	16 Q	3:36.54	3	did not advance			
Roosa Niemi	Cross-country cross	3:48.64	17 Q	—N/a		3:42.13	6	did not advance	

== Figure skating ==
Singles

Athlete	Event	SP		FS		Total	
Athlete	Event	Points	Rank	Points	Rank	Points	Rank
Lauri Lankila	Boys' singles	30.65	15	61.43	15	92.08	15
Anni Järvenpää	Girls' singles	48.27	9	72.64	15	120.91	13

Mixed NOC team trophy

Athletes	Event	Free skate/Free dance					
Athletes	Event	Ice dance	Pairs	Girls	Boys	Total	
Athletes	Event	Points Team points	Points Team points	Points Team points	Points Team points	Points	Rank
Team Focus; Maria Golubtsova / Kirill Belobrov (UKR); Zhao Ying / Xie Zhong (CHN); Yuna Shiraiwa (JPN); Lauri Lankila (FIN)	Team trophy	64.68; 4	92.74; 5	110.01; 8	61.57; 1	18	5

== Freestyle skiing ==
Ski cross

Athlete	Event	Qualification		Group heats		Semifinal	Final
Athlete	Event	Time	Rank	Points	Rank	Position	Position
Minja Lehikoinen	Girls' ski cross	47.58	10	13	8 Q	4 FB	8

Slopestyle

Athlete	Event	Final			
Athlete	Event	Run 1	Run 2	Best	Rank
Joona Sipola	Boys' slopestyle	47.80	63.00	63.00	10
Anni Karava	Girls' slopestyle	59.60	61.20	61.20	5

== Ice hockey ==
Athlete	Event	Qualification		Final	
Athlete	Event	Points	Rank	Points	Rank
Aleks Haatanen	Boys' individual skills challenge	14	5 Q	11	5
Kiia Nousiainen	Girls' individual skills challenge	8	11	did not advance	

=== Boys' tournament ===
Roster

- Tobias Akerman
- Justus Annunen
- Konsta Hirvonen
- Jesperi Kotkaniemi
- Miska Kukkonen
- Rasmus Kupari
- Eetu Maki
- Kalle Matikainen
- Jesse Moilanen
- Arttu Nevasaari
- Niklas Nordgren
- Jasper Rannisto
- Uula Ruikka
- Santeri Salmela
- Samuel Salonen
- Toni Utunen
- Jimi Uusitalo

Group Stage

Pos	Team	Pld	W	OTW	OTL	L	GF	GA	GD	Pts	Qualification
1	Canada	4	3	0	0	1	18	7	+11	9	Advance to semifinals
2	United States	4	3	0	0	1	18	7	+11	9	Advance to semifinals
3	Russia	4	2	1	0	1	21	9	+12	8	Advance to semifinals
4	Finland	4	1	0	1	2	14	11	+3	4	Advance to semifinals
5	Norway	4	0	0	0	4	1	38	−37	0	

Updated to match(es) played on 19 February 2016. Source: IIHF.com

12 February 2016; 14:00	Finland	11–0 (5–0, 2–0, 4–0)	Norway	Youth Hall; Attendance: 550

Game reference

Justus Annunen
Goalies
Kristian Hovik
Referee:
(Czech Republic) Daniel Prazak
Linesmen:
(United Kingdom) Danny Beresford
(Belarus) Aleh Kliashcheunikau

Moilanen (Maki, Salonen) – 05:53	1–0
Maki (Salonen, Kupari) – 08:38	2–0
Nordgren (Matikainen, Moilanen) –09:56	3–0
Nevasaari (Kotkaniemi, Moilanen) – 11:02	4–0
Utunen (Kotkaniemi, Moilanen) (PP) – 12:59	5–0
Maki (Hirvonen) – 22:17	6–0
Nevasaari (Moilanen) – 25:24	7–0
Nordgren (Matikainen) (SH) – 35:28	8–0
Nordgren (Hirvonen, Rannisto) – 38:38	9–0
Kukkonen (Utunen, Nordgren) – 38:59	10–0
Nordgren (Ruikka) – 39:56	11–0

12 min
Penalties
7.5 min
36
Shots
3

13 February 2016; 20:00	United States	4–1 (2–1, 1–0, 1–0)	Finland	Kristins Hall; Attendance: 890

Game reference

Todd Scott
Goalies
Jimi Uusitalo
Referee:
(Switzerland) Alex DiPietro
Linesmen:
(France) Clement Goncalves
(Sweden) Tobias Nordlander

	0–1	02:36 – Salonen (Maki)
Wise (DeBoer, Krygier) – 08:39	1–1
Walsh (Emberson) – 13:10	2–1
Krygier (MacKinnon) – 20:25	3–1
Weiss (PS) – 42:12	4–1

4.5 min
Penalties
7.5 min
24
Shots
22

15 February 2016; 17:00	Canada	5–1 (2–1, 1–0, 2–0)	Finland	Kristins Hall; Attendance: 950

Game reference

Alexis Gravel
Goalies
Justus Annunen
Referee:
(Czech Republic) Daniel Prazak
Linesmen:
(United Kingdom) Danny Beresford
(Norway) Thomas Nordberg Pettersen

Dudas (Focht) (PP) – 01:46	1–0
Roberts (McShane, Burzan) – 02:20	2–0
	2–1	12:03 – Utunen (Kotkaniemi) (PP2)
Burzan – 16:03	3–1
Groulx (SH) – 30:50	4–1
T. Smith (PP) – 38:52	5–1

20.5 min
Penalties
9 min
28
Shots
25

16 February 2016; 17:00	Finland	1–2 GWS (0–1, 1–0, 0–0, 0–0, 0–1)	Russia	Kristins Hall; Attendance: 653

Game reference
Jimi Uusitalo	Goalies	Amir Miftakhov	Referee: (Germany) Marc Iwert; Linesmen: (Denmark) Niclas Lundgaard (Norway) Thomas Nordberg Pettersen
/ 0–1 / 02:11 – Svechnikov (Khovanov); Kotkaniemi (Utunen, Nevasaari) – 26:26 / 1–1			Referee: (Germany) Marc Iwert; Linesmen: (Denmark) Niclas Lundgaard (Norway) Thomas Nordberg Pettersen
Salonen (miss); Kotkaniemi (miss); Maki (miss); Nevasaari; Nevasaari (miss); Ruikka (miss)	Shootout	(miss) Khovanov; (miss) Svechnikov; (miss) Zhabreyev; Khovanov; (miss) Denezhkin; Khovanov	Referee: (Germany) Marc Iwert; Linesmen: (Denmark) Niclas Lundgaard (Norway) Thomas Nordberg Pettersen
9 min	Penalties	9 min	Referee: (Germany) Marc Iwert; Linesmen: (Denmark) Niclas Lundgaard (Norway) Thomas Nordberg Pettersen
21	Shots	16	Referee: (Germany) Marc Iwert; Linesmen: (Denmark) Niclas Lundgaard (Norway) Thomas Nordberg Pettersen

Semifinals

19 February 2016; 17:00	Canada	4–3 GWS (0–1, 2–1, 1–1, 0–0, 1–0)	Finland	Kristins Hall; Attendance: 1,472

Game reference

Alexis Gravel
Goalies
Jimi Uusitalo
Referee:
(Czech Republic) Daniel Prazak
Linesmen:
(France) Clement Goncalves
(Belarus) Aleh Kliashcheunikau

	0–1	14:53 Utunen (Kotkaniemi, Nordgren) (PP2)
	0–2	15:30 – Moilanen (Nordgren, Utunen) (PP2)
Focht (Groulx, Merkley) (SH) – 18:59	1–2
MacDonald (Merkley, Burzan) – 21:22	2–2
	2–3	39:10 – Kotkaniemi (Rannisto, Nordgren)
Groulx (Merkley, Focht) (PP) – 41:32	3–3

Groulx
MacDonald (miss)
Merkley
Shootout
(miss) Nordgren
(miss) Nevasaari
23.5 min
Penalties
7.5 min
21
Shots
29

Bronze medal game

20 February 2016; 20:00	Russia	6–2 (1–1, 3–1, 2–0)	Finland	Kristins Hall; Attendance: 1,652

Game reference

Amir Miftakhov
Goalies
Justus Annunen
Referee:
(Germany) Marc Iwert
Linesmen:
(Belarus) Aleh Kliashcheunikau
(Norway) Thomas Nordberg Pettersen

	0–1	00:30 – Kupari (Nevasaari)
Zhuravlyov (Denisenko, Zhabreyev) (PP) – 08:28	1–1
Nizhnikov (Babintsev, Denisenko) – 16:00	2–1
	2–2	24:15 – Kotkaniemi (Akerman) (PP)
Sokolov (Zhilyakov) – 28:45	3–2
Denisenko (Zhilyakov, Zhabreyev) – 29:43	4–2
Kotkov (Khovanov) – 30:16	5–2
Khovanov (Kotkov) (EA) – 42:21	6–2

12 min
Penalties
7.5 min
19
Shots
20

== Nordic combined ==
Athlete	Event	Ski jumping				Cross-country	
Athlete	Event	Distance	Points	Rank	Deficit	Time	Rank
Wille Karhumaa	Normal hill/5 km	92.5	112.7	9	1:16	14:27.1	8

== Ski jumping ==
Athlete	Event	First round			Final			Total	
Athlete	Event	Distance	Points	Rank	Distance	Points	Rank	Points	Rank
Andreas Alamommo	Boys' normal hill	91.0	112.4	8	90.0	109.1	6	221.5	6

== Snowboarding ==
Halfpipe

Athlete	Event	Final				
Athlete	Event	Run 1	Run 2	Run 3	Best	Rank
Ville Mustonen	Boys' halfpipe	56.00	30.75	24.75	56.00	10
Rene Rinnekangas	Boys' halfpipe	36.25	62.00	39.00	62.00	8
Henna Ikola	Girls' halfpipe	62.25	60.75	23.75	62.25	7
Elli Pikkujamsa	Girls' halfpipe	59.50	53.00	47.25	59.50	8

Slopestyle

Athlete	Event	Final			
Athlete	Event	Run 1	Run 2	Best	Rank
Ville Mustonen	Boys' slopestyle	30.00	27.75	30.00	21
Rene Rinnekangas	Boys' slopestyle	70.00	87.75	87.75	3rd place, bronze medalist(s)
Henna Ikola	Girls' slopestyle	38.00	79.00	79.00	3rd place, bronze medalist(s)
Elli Pikkujamsa	Girls' slopestyle	82.25	81.25	82.25	2nd place, silver medalist(s)

Snowboard and ski cross relay

Athlete	Event	Quarterfinal	Semifinal	Final
Athlete	Event	Position	Position	Position
Caterina Carpano (ITA); Minja Lehikoinen (FIN); Yoshiki Takahara (JPN); Tobias Knollseisen (ITA)	Team snowboard ski cross	3	did not advance	

Qualification legend: FA – Qualify to medal round; FB – Qualify to consolation round

== Speed skating ==
Boys

Athlete	Event	Race 1		Race 2		Final	
Athlete	Event	Time	Rank	Time	Rank	Time	Rank
Jaakko Hautamaki	500 m	39.55	26	39.79	26	79.35	26
Jaakko Hautamaki	1500 m	—N/a				2:02.62	26
Jaakko Hautamaki	Mass start	—N/a				5:56.65	20
Samuli Suomalainen	500 m	37.11	3	37.06	5	74.17	4
Samuli Suomalainen	1500 m	—N/a				1:57.36	18
Samuli Suomalainen	Mass start	—N/a				5:55.01	17

Mixed team sprint

Athletes	Event	Final	
Athletes	Event	Time	Rank
Team 5 Erika Lindgren (SWE); Isabelle van Elst (NED); Yevgeny Bolgov (BLR); Samuli Suomalainen (FIN)	Mixed team sprint	2:16.73	11
Team 13; Sofya Napolskikh (RUS); Elena Samkova (RUS); Jaakko Hautamaki (FIN); Kim Min-seok (KOR)	Mixed team sprint	1:58.97	5

== See also ==
- Finland at the 2016 Summer Olympics
