= Norway at the 2016 Winter Youth Olympics =

- IOC code: NOR
- NOC: Norwegian Olympic Committee
- Website: www.idrett.no

in Lillehammer
- Competitors: 73 in 15 sports
- Flag bearer: Aleksander Melås
- Medals Ranked 5th: Gold 4 Silver 9 Bronze 6 Total 19

Winter Youth Olympics appearances
- 2012; 2016; 2020; 2024

Norway competed at the 2016 Winter Youth Olympics as the host nation in Lillehammer, Norway from 12 to 21 February 2016.

== Medalists ==
Medal	Name	Sport	Event	Date
Gold	Sivert Bakken	Biathlon	Boys' pursuit	15 February
Gold	Thomas Larsen	Cross-country skiing	Boys' sprint	16 February
Gold	Birk Ruud	Freestyle skiing	Boys' slopestyle	19 February
Gold	Marthe Johansen; Marit Oeygard; Sivert Bakken; Fredrik Bucher-Johannessen	Biathlon	Mixed relay	21 February
Silver	Thomas Larsen	Cross-country skiing	Boys' cross-country cross	13 February
Silver	Sivert Bakken	Biathlon	Boys' sprint	14 February
Silver	Marthe Johansen	Biathlon	Girls' sprint	14 February
Silver	Marthe Johansen	Biathlon	Girls' pursuit	15 February
Silver	Marius Lindvik	Ski jumping	Boys' normal hill	16 February
Silver	Marthe Johansen; Fredrik Bucher-Johannessen	Biathlon	Single mixed relay	17 February
Silver	Vebjørn Hegdal	Cross-country skiing	Boys' 10 km	18 February
Silver	Alexander Hestengen	Skeleton	Boys'	19 February
Silver	Anna Odine Strøm; Einar Oftebro; Marius Lindvik; Martine Engebretsen; Vebjoern Hegdal	Nordic combined	Nordic mixed team	19 February
Bronze	Trym Sunde Andreassen	Freestyle skiing	Boys' halfpipe	14 February
Bronze	Martine Engebretsen	Cross-country skiing	Girls' sprint	16 February
Bronze	Vebjørn Hegdal	Cross-country skiing	Boys' sprint	16 February
Bronze	Allan Johansson	Speed skating	Boys' mass start	19 February
Bronze	Odin Breivik	Alpine skiing	Boys' slalom	19 February
Bronze	Kristian Olsen	Bobsleigh	Boys' monobob	20 February

=== Medalists in mixed NOCs events ===
Medal	Name	Sport	Event	Date
Gold	Ane Farstad	Short track	Mixed team relay	20 February
Bronze	Allan Johansson	Speed skating	Mixed team sprint	17 February
Bronze	Andreas Haarstad	Curling	Mixed doubles	21 February

== Alpine skiing ==
Boys

Athlete	Event	Run 1		Run 2		Total	
Athlete	Event	Time	Rank	Time	Rank	Time	Rank
Odin Breivik	Slalom	49.64	1	50.43	8	1:40.07	3rd place, bronze medalist(s)
Odin Breivik	Giant slalom	1:20.84	19	did not finish			
Odin Breivik	Super-G	—N/a				1:11.82	10
Odin Breivik	Combined	1:13.00	9	did not advance			
Henrik Thorsby	Slalom	52.02	19	50.12	5	1:42.14	11
Henrik Thorsby	Giant slalom	1:21.94	24	1:20.16	14	2:42.10	18
Henrik Thorsby	Super-G	—N/a				1:11.79	9
Henrik Thorsby	Combined	DNF		did not advance			

Girls

Athlete	Event	Run 1		Run 2		Total	
Athlete	Event	Time	Rank	Time	Rank	Time	Rank
Kristiane Bekkestad	Slalom	58.62	18	53.04	13	1:51.66	15
Kristiane Bekkestad	Giant slalom	1:24.55	22	1:19.22	17	2:43.77	18
Kristiane Bekkestad	Super-G	—N/a				1:13.66	6
Kristiane Bekkestad	Combined	1:17.10	14	43.95	5	2:01.05	9
Kajsa Lie	Slalom	56.45	9	51.38	6	1:47.83	9
Kajsa Lie	Giant slalom	1:20.86	14	1:16.43	11	2:37.29	13
Kajsa Lie	Super-G	—N/a				DNF	
Kajsa Lie	Combined	1:15.22	8	44.19	7	1:59.41	5

Parallel mixed team

Athletes	Event	Round of 16	Quarterfinals	Semifinals	Final / BM	
Athletes	Event	Opposition Score	Opposition Score	Opposition Score	Opposition Score	Rank
Kajsa Lie; Henrik Thorsby	Parallel mixed team	Czech Republic; W 2^{+} – 2	Canada; L 2 – 2^{+}	did not advance		

== Biathlon ==
Boys

Athlete	Event	Time	Misses	Rank
Sivert Bakken	Sprint	19:08.6	2	2nd place, silver medalist(s)
Sivert Bakken	Pursuit	28:10.7	4	1st place, gold medalist(s)
Fredrik Bucher-Johannessen	Sprint	19:29.1	2	4
Fredrik Bucher-Johannessen	Pursuit	31:09.5	8	12

Girls

Athlete	Event	Time	Misses	Rank
Marthe Johansen	Sprint	18:29.1	1	2nd place, silver medalist(s)
Marthe Johansen	Pursuit	25:20.4	4	2nd place, silver medalist(s)
Marit Oeygard	Sprint	19:00.7	2	7
Marit Oeygard	Pursuit	26:32.0	4	8

Mixed

Athletes	Event	Time	Misses	Rank
Marthe Johansen; Fredrik Bucher-Johannessen	Single mixed relay	41:35.6	1+12	2nd place, silver medalist(s)
Marthe Johansen; Marit Oeygard; Sivert Bakken; Fredrik Bucher-Johannessen	Mixed relay	1:18:35.6	0+11	1st place, gold medalist(s)

== Bobsleigh ==
Athlete	Event	Run 1		Run 2		Total	
Athlete	Event	Time	Rank	Time	Rank	Time	Rank
Kristian Olsen	Boys'	57.43	5	57.10	1	1:54.53	3rd place, bronze medalist(s)

== Cross-country skiing ==
Boys

Athlete	Event	Qualification		Quarterfinal		Semifinal		Final	
Athlete	Event	Time	Rank	Time	Rank	Time	Rank	Time	Rank
Vebjørn Hegdal	10 km freestyle	—N/a						23:30.8	2nd place, silver medalist(s)
Vebjørn Hegdal	Classical sprint	2:59.75	6 Q	2:57.95	1 Q	2:55.59	1 Q	2:56.49	3rd place, bronze medalist(s)
Vebjørn Hegdal	Cross-country cross	3:05.96	4 Q	—N/a		3:13.21	7	did not advance	
Thomas Larsen	10 km freestyle	—N/a						24:03.6	4
Thomas Larsen	Classical sprint	2:56.89	2 Q	3:04.54	1 Q	2:57.63	2 Q	2:55.39	1st place, gold medalist(s)
Thomas Larsen	Cross-country cross	3:05.67	3 Q	—N/a		3:02.35	1 Q	3:00.73	2nd place, silver medalist(s)

Girls

Athlete	Event	Qualification		Quarterfinal		Semifinal		Final	
Athlete	Event	Time	Rank	Time	Rank	Time	Rank	Time	Rank
Martine Engebretsen	5 km freestyle	—N/a						14:24.8	22
Martine Engebretsen	Classical sprint	3:32.68	6 Q	3:28.57	1 Q	3:24.79	2 Q	3:22.82	3rd place, bronze medalist(s)
Martine Engebretsen	Cross-country cross	3:38.10	6 Q	—N/a		3:39.31	2 Q	3:32.48	5
Nora Ulvang	5 km freestyle	—N/a						DNS	
Nora Ulvang	Classical sprint	3:44.02	24 Q	3:32.30	3	did not advance			
Nora Ulvang	Cross-country cross	3:44.85	12 Q	—N/a		3:40.21	5	did not advance	

== Curling ==
=== Mixed team ===
Team

- Andreas Hårstad
- Michael Mellemseter
- Eline Mjøen
- Maia Ramsfjell

Round Robin

Group B	Skip	W	L
Canada	Mary Fay	7	0
Great Britain	Ross Whyte	6	1
Sweden	Johan Nygren	5	2
Norway	Maia Ramsfjell	4	3
South Korea	Hong Yun-jeong	3	4
Czech Republic	Pavel Mareš	2	5
Estonia	Eiko-Siim Peips	1	6
Brazil	Victor Santos	0	7

Draw 1

Sheet B	1	2	3	4	5	6	7	8	9	Final
Sweden (Nygren)	0	2	0	1	0	1	0	3	1	8
Norway (Ramsfjell) 🔨	2	0	1	0	2	0	2	0	0	7

Draw 2

Sheet C	1	2	3	4	5	6	7	8	Final
Czech Republic (Mareš) 🔨	1	0	0	1	0	1	X	X	3
Norway (Ramsfjell)	0	2	2	0	6	0	X	X	10

Draw 3

Sheet A	1	2	3	4	5	6	7	8	Final
Estonia (Peips)	0	0	1	0	0	0	X	X	1
Norway (Ramsfjell) 🔨	4	1	0	1	0	2	X	X	8

Draw 4

Sheet D	1	2	3	4	5	6	7	8	Final
Great Britain (Whyte) 🔨	0	4	1	4	0	0	X	X	9
Norway (Ramsfjell)	1	0	0	0	2	0	X	X	3

Draw 5

Sheet B	1	2	3	4	5	6	7	8	9	Final
Norway (Ramsfjell) 🔨	0	0	0	1	0	0	0	1	0	2
Canada (Fay)	0	0	0	0	1	1	0	0	2	4

Draw 6

Sheet C	1	2	3	4	5	6	7	8	Final
Norway (Ramsfjell) 🔨	4	0	0	3	2	2	X	X	11
Brazil (Santos)	0	2	0	0	0	0	X	X	2

Draw 7

Sheet A	1	2	3	4	5	6	7	8	9	Final
Norway (Ramsfjell)	0	0	0	1	1	1	2	0	2	7
South Korea (Hong) 🔨	0	3	0	0	0	0	0	2	0	5

Quarterfinals

Sheet C	1	2	3	4	5	6	7	8	9	Final
United States (Violette) 🔨	0	0	0	1	1	0	2	0	1	5
Norway (Ramsfjell)	0	0	2	0	0	1	0	1	0	4

=== Mixed doubles ===
Athletes	Event	Round of 32	Round of 16	Quarterfinals	Semifinals	Final / BM	
Athletes	Event	Opposition Result	Opposition Result	Opposition Result	Opposition Result	Opposition Result	Rank
Zhao Ruiyi (CHN); Andreas Haarstad (NOR)	Mixed doubles	Engler (SUI); Santos (BRA); W 9 – 1	Lee (KOR); Nygren (SWE); W 11 – 6	Constantini (ITA); Kinnear (GBR); W 10 – 9	Matsuzawa (JPN); Hoesli (SUI); L 6 – 7	Sasaki (JPN); Tardi (CAN); W 10 – 1	3rd place, bronze medalist(s)
Martina Ghezze (ITA); Michael Mellemseter (NOR)	Mixed doubles	Witschonke (SUI); Gustsin (EST); L 3 – 9	did not advance				
Eline Mjoen (NOR); Pavel Mares (CZE)	Mixed doubles	Matsuzawa (JPN); Hoesli (SUI); L 6 – 9	did not advance				
Maia Ramsfjell (NOR); Kim Ho-geon (KOR)	Mixed doubles	Smith (NZL); Lockmann (SUI); W 10 – 4	Barros (BRA); Richardson (USA); W 9 – 7	Sasaki (JPN); Tardi (CAN); L 5 – 7	did not advance		

== Figure skating ==
Singles

Athlete	Event	SP		FS		Total	
Athlete	Event	Points	Rank	Points	Rank	Points	Rank
Juni Marie Benjaminsen	Girls' singles	47.18	12	69.98	16	117.16	15

== Freestyle skiing ==
Halfpipe

Athlete	Event	Final				
Athlete	Event	Run 1	Run 2	Run 3	Best	Rank
Trym Sunde Andreassen	Boys' halfpipe	80.20	30.00	52.40	80.20	3rd place, bronze medalist(s)

Ski cross

Athlete	Event	Qualification		Group heats		Semifinal	Final
Athlete	Event	Time	Rank	Points	Rank	Position	Position
Mathis Bosshard Haavi	Boys' ski cross	45.99	14 Q	11	10	did not advance	
Ebba Ruud	Girls' ski cross	50.39	16	7	15	did not advance	

Slopestyle

Athlete	Event	Final			
Athlete	Event	Run 1	Run 2	Best	Rank
Birk Ruud	Boys' slopestyle	89.20	57.80	89.20	1st place, gold medalist(s)
Trym Sunde Andreassen	Boys' slopestyle	79.80	39.80	79.80	5
Tora Johansen	Girls' slopestyle	41.60	41.40	41.60	10

== Ice hockey ==
Athlete	Event	Qualification		Final	
Athlete	Event	Points	Rank	Points	Rank
Sander Hurrod	Boys' individual skills challenge	13	6 Q	9	8
Millie Sirum	Girls' individual skills challenge	15	4 Q	12	4

=== Boys' tournament ===
Roster

- Erik Beier Jensen
- Jens Bjornslett
- Sondre Bolling Vaaler
- Truls Brathen
- Pontus Finstad
- Kristian Hovik
- Sander Hurrod
- Markus Mikkelsen
- Fredrik Pedersen
- Mathias Emilio Pettersen
- Kalle Rode
- Lars Rodne
- Theo Rooseboom De Vries
- Oliver Skramo
- Alexander Thomas
- Kristoffer Thomassen
- Christian Wetteland

Group Stage

Pos	Team	Pld	W	OTW	OTL	L	GF	GA	GD	Pts	Qualification
1	Canada	4	3	0	0	1	18	7	+11	9	Advance to semifinals
2	United States	4	3	0	0	1	18	7	+11	9	Advance to semifinals
3	Russia	4	2	1	0	1	21	9	+12	8	Advance to semifinals
4	Finland	4	1	0	1	2	14	11	+3	4	Advance to semifinals
5	Norway	4	0	0	0	4	1	38	−37	0	

Updated to match(es) played on 19 February 2016. Source: IIHF.com

12 February 2016; 14:00	Finland	11–0 (5–0, 2–0, 4–0)	Norway	Youth Hall; Attendance: 550

Game reference

Justus Annunen
Goalies
Kristian Hovik
Referee:
(Czech Republic) Daniel Prazak
Linesmen:
(United Kingdom) Danny Beresford
(Belarus) Aleh Kliashcheunikau

Moilanen (Maki, Salonen) – 05:53	1–0
Maki (Salonen, Kupari) – 08:38	2–0
Nordgren (Matikainen, Moilanen) –09:56	3–0
Nevasaari (Kotkaniemi, Moilanen) – 11:02	4–0
Utunen (Kotkaniemi, Moilanen) (PP) – 12:59	5–0
Maki (Hirvonen) – 22:17	6–0
Nevasaari (Moilanen) – 25:24	7–0
Nordgren (Matikainen) (SH) – 35:28	8–0
Nordgren (Hirvonen, Rannisto) – 38:38	9–0
Kukkonen (Utunen, Nordgren) – 38:59	10–0
Nordgren (Ruikka) – 39:56	11–0

12 min
Penalties
7.5 min
36
Shots
3

14 February 2016; 20:00	Norway	0–8 (0–3, 0–4, 0–1)	United States	Kristins Hall; Attendance: 2,094

Game reference

Theo Rooseboom de Vries
Goalies
Drew DeRidder
Referee:
(Germany) Marc Iwert
Linesmen:
(Belarus) Aleh Kliashcheunikau
(Denmark) Niclas Lundsgaard

0–1	06:48 – Wahlstrom (Weiss, DeBoer) (PP)
0–2	11:09 – Wahlstrom (Weiss, Wise)
0–3	11:49 – (Pivonka, Middendorf, Emberson)
0–4	17:09 – Pivonka (Walsh, M. Samuelsson) (PP)
0–5	21:35 – Middendorf (Krygier, Pivonka) (SH)
0–6	23:04 – Pivonka (Middendorf, Semik)
0–7	24:48 – DeBoer (Wise, Weiss)
0–8	30:31 – Wahlstrom (Wise, Weiss)

7.5 min
Penalties
6 min
11
Shots
35

15 February 2016; 20:00	Russia	13–1 (4–0, 3–0, 6–1)	Norway	Kristins Hall; Attendance: 1,198

Game reference

Georgi Dubrovski
Goalies
Kristian Hovik
Referee:
(Switzerland) Alex DiPietro
Linesmen:
(France) Clement Goncalves
(Sweden) Tobias Nordlander

Zhabreyev (Denisenko) – 03:17	1–0
Zhabreyev (Kupchikhin, Nizhnikov) – 11:01	2–0
Svechnikov (Khovanov, Zhilyakov) – 11:27	3–0
Svechnikov (Sitdikov) – 13:43	4–0
Zhabreyev (Svechnikov) (SH) – 21:01	5–0
Denezhkin (Sokolov) – 24:45	6–0
Svechnikov (Zhabreyev) – 29:59	7–0
	7–1	30:42 – Pettersen (Beier Jensen, Skramo)
Khovanov (Svechnikov) – 31:55	8–1
Nizhnikov (Denisenko) – 33:48	9–1
Nizhnikov (Denisenko, Zhabreyev) – 37:05	10–1
Svechnikov (Khovanov, Sokolov) (PP) – 38:34	11–1
Sokolov (Rotenberg) – 42:41	12–1
Denisenko (Zhuravlyov, Zhabreyev) – 43:36	13–1

19 min
Penalties
6 min
51
Shots
10

18 February 2016; 17:00	Norway	0–6 (0–1, 0–3, 0–2)	Canada	Kristins Hall; Attendance: 2,250

Game reference

Theo Rooseboom de Vries
Goalies
Olivier Rodrigue
Referee:
(Germany) Marc Iwert
Linesmen:
(United Kingdom) Danny Beresford
(France) Clement Goncalves

0–1	06:02 – Roberts (Burzan, McIsaac (PP))
0–2	18:32 – Focht (Nielsen, Smith)
0–3	25:19 – Burzan (Chisholm)
0–4	25:57 – McIsaac (Fortier) (SH)
0–5	30:29 – McShane (Smith, Busby)
0–6	44:43 – Groulx (Chisholm, McIsaac) (PP)

9 min
Penalties
4.5 min
2
Shots
37

=== Girls' tournament ===
Roster

- Ingrid Berge
- Marthe Brunvold
- Nora Christophersen
- Mabel Endrerud
- Karen Forgaard
- Hedda Havarstein
- Mia Isdahl
- Karen Jensen
- Thea Jorgensen
- Stine Kjellesvik
- Maren Knudsen
- Kaja Kristensen
- Malin Kristensen
- Ena Marie Nystrom
- Emilie Olsen
- Kamilla Olsen
- Millie Sirum

Group Stage

Pos	Team	Pld	W	OTW	OTL	L	GF	GA	GD	Pts	Qualification
1	Sweden	4	2	1	1	0	10	3	+7	9	Advance to semifinals
2	Czech Republic	4	3	0	0	1	7	4	+3	9	Advance to semifinals
3	Switzerland	4	2	1	0	1	10	6	+4	8	Advance to semifinals
4	Slovakia	4	1	0	1	2	6	9	−3	4	Advance to semifinals
5	Norway	4	0	0	0	4	2	13	−11	0	

Updated to match(es) played on 19 February 2016. Source: IIHF.com

12 February 2016; 14:00	Slovakia	2–1 (0–1, 1–0, 1–0)	Norway	Kristins Hall; Attendance: 425

Game reference

Simona Lezovicova
Andrea Risianova
Goalies
Ena Marie Nystrøm
Mia Christine Isdahl
Referee:
(Canada) Vanessa Ley
Linesmen:
(Netherlands) Senovwa Mollen
(Germany) Jacqueline Sauer

	0–1	Sirum (Endrerud, Jørgensen – 12:45
Agostonova – 38:04	1–1
Matasova (Čorňáková, Koyšová) – 15:51	2–1

1.5 min
Penalties
29.5 min
19
Shots
8

14 February 2016; 17:00	Norway	0–3 (0–0, 0–3, 0–0)	Czech Republic	Kristins Hall

15 February 2016; 20:00	Switzerland	3–1 (1–0, 0–0, 2–1)	Norway	Youth Hall

18 February 2016; 14:00	Norway	0–5 (0–2, 0–1, 0–2)	Sweden	Kristins Hall

== Luge ==
Athlete	Event	Run 1		Run 2		Total	
Athlete	Event	Time	Rank	Time	Rank	Time	Rank
Aleksander Melaas	Boys	48.239	8	48.150	7	1:36.389	8
Vilde Tangnes	Girls	53.545	7	53.339	7	1:46.884	6

== Nordic combined ==
Individual

Athlete	Event	Ski jumping				Cross-country	
Athlete	Event	Distance	Points	Rank	Deficit	Time	Rank
Einar Oftebro	Normal hill/5 km	85.0	99.3	13	2:10	16:09.0	14

Nordic mixed team

Athlete	Event	Ski jumping			Cross-country	
Athlete	Event	Points	Rank	Deficit	Time	Rank
Anna Odine Strøm; Einar Oftebro; Marius Lindvik; Martine Engebretsen; Vebjoern Hegdal	Nordic mixed team	337.8	6	0:51	26:38.0	2nd place, silver medalist(s)

== Skeleton ==
Athlete	Event	Run 1		Run 2		Total	
Athlete	Event	Time	Rank	Time	Rank	Time	Rank
Alexander Hestengen	Boys	53.99	2	53.95	2	1:47.94	2nd place, silver medalist(s)

== Ski jumping ==
Individual

Athlete	Event	First round			Final			Total	
Athlete	Event	Distance	Points	Rank	Distance	Points	Rank	Points	Rank
Marius Lindvik	Boys' normal hill	98.5	129.2	2	94.0	121.8	2	251.0	2nd place, silver medalist(s)
Anna Odine Strøm	Girls' normal hill	84.0	94.0	7	86.5	98.4	6	192.4	6

Team

Athlete	Event	First round		Final		Total	
Athlete	Event	Points	Rank	Points	Rank	Points	Rank
Anna Odine Strøm; Einar Oftebro; Marius Lindvik	Team competition	309.4	6	300.5	6	609.9	6

== Short track speed skating ==
Boys

Athlete	Event	Quarterfinal		Semifinal		Final	
Athlete	Event	Time	Rank	Time	Rank	Time	Rank
Martinius Elvebakken	500 m	45.998	3 SC/D	45.018	4 FD	45.001	13
Martinius Elvebakken	1000 m	1:39.565	4 SC/D	1:54.966	3 FD	1:43.686	13

Girls

Athlete	Event	Quarterfinal		Semifinal		Final	
Athlete	Event	Time	Rank	Time	Rank	Time	Rank
Ane Farstad	500 m	1:24.363	4 SC/D	50.538	4 FD	1:03.617	13
Ane Farstad	1000 m	1:50.565	3 FC	—N/a		1:41.666	13

Mixed team relay

Athlete	Event	Semifinal		Final	
Athlete	Event	Time	Rank	Time	Rank
Team B Ane Farstad (NOR); Kim Ji-yoo (KOR); Stijn Desmet (BEL); Quentin Fercoq (FRA)	Mixed team relay	4:16.206	2 FA	4:14.413	1st place, gold medalist(s)
Team G Elizaveta Kuznetsova (RUS); Angelina Tarasova (RUS); Martinius Elvebakken (NOR); Hwang Dae-heon (KOR)	Mixed team relay	4:20.469	4 FB	4:23.553	5

Qualification Legend: FA=Final A (medal); FB=Final B (non-medal); FC=Final C (non-medal); FD=Final D (non-medal); SA/B=Semifinals A/B; SC/D=Semifinals C/D; ADV=Advanced to Next Round; PEN=Penalized

== Snowboarding ==
Halfpipe

Athlete	Event	Final				
Athlete	Event	Run 1	Run 2	Run 3	Best	Rank
Mathias Echhoff	Boys' halfpipe	34.75	55.00	16.25	55.00	11
Hanne Eilertsen	Girls' halfpipe	did not show				
Nora Frisvold	Girls' halfpipe	26.00	22.25	23.75	26.00	16

Snowboard cross

Athlete	Event	Qualification		Group heats		Semifinal	Final
Athlete	Event	Time	Rank	Points	Rank	Position	Position
Herman Svendsen	Boys' snowboard cross	49.94	12 Q	11	10	did not advance	

Slopestyle

Athlete	Event	Final			
Athlete	Event	Run 1	Run 2	Best	Rank
Mathias Eckhoff	Boys' slopestyle	81.75	32.00	81.75	7
Isak Ulstein	Boys' slopestyle	85.50	44.75	85.50	5
Hanne Eilertsen	Girls' slopestyle	33.50	19.00	33.50	16
Nora Frisvold	Girls' slopestyle	46.50	31.50	46.50	12

== Speed skating ==
Boys

Athlete	Event	Race 1		Race 2		Final	
Athlete	Event	Time	Rank	Time	Rank	Time	Rank
Allan Johansson	500 m	37.556	13	37.49	12	75.05	12
Allan Johansson	1500 m	—N/a				1:53.37	4
Allan Johansson	Mass start	—N/a				10 pts	3rd place, bronze medalist(s)
Jonas Kristensen	500 m	37.96	15	37.830	15	75.79	15
Jonas Kristensen	1500 m	—N/a				1:56.16	10
Jonas Kristensen	Mass start	—N/a				5:55.05	18

Girls

Athlete	Event	Race 1		Race 2		Final	
Athlete	Event	Time	Rank	Time	Rank	Time	Rank
Camilla Evjevik	500 m	43.20	21	43.74	23	86.95	23
Camilla Evjevik	1500 m	—N/a				2:12.72	18
Camilla Evjevik	Mass start	—N/a				5:58.67	19

Mixed team sprint

Athletes	Event	Final	
Athletes	Event	Time	Rank
Team 4 Camilla Evjevik (NOR); Park Ji-woo (KOR); Jonas Kristensen (NOR); Gawel Oficjalski (POL)	Mixed team sprint	1:59.93	8
Team 10; Chiara Cristelli (ITA); Mihaela Hogas (ROU); Ole Jeske (GER); Allan Johansson (NOR)	Mixed team sprint	1:58.87	3rd place, bronze medalist(s)

== See also ==
- Norway at the 2016 Summer Olympics
