= Biathlon at the 2016 Winter Youth Olympics – Single mixed relay =

Single mixed relay at the II Winter Youth Olympic Games
- Venue: Birkebeineren Ski Stadium
- Date: 17 February
- Competitors: 54 from 27 nations
- Winning time: 41:35.4

Medalists
1st place, gold medalist(s)		Meng Fanqi; Zhu Zhenyu	China
2nd place, silver medalist(s)		Marthe Kråkstad Johansen; Fredrik Bucher-Johannessen	Norway
3rd place, bronze medalist(s)		Ekaterina Ponedelko; Egor Tutmin	Russia

The single mixed relay biathlon competition at the 2016 Winter Youth Olympics was held on 17 February at the Birkebeineren Ski Stadium.

== Results ==
The race was started at 11:00.

Rank	Bib	Country	Time	Penalties (P+S)	Deficit
1st place, gold medalist(s)	24	China; Meng Fanqi; Zhu Zhenyu; Meng Fanqi; Zhu Zhenyu	41:35.4; 9:30.4; 9:56.8; 9:32.9; 12:35.3	0+0 2+3; 0+0 0+0; 0+0 2+3; 0+0 0+0; 0+0 0+0	—
2nd place, silver medalist(s)	4	Norway; Marthe Kråkstad Johansen; Fredrik Bucher-Johannessen; Marthe Kråkstad Johansen; Fredrik Bucher-Johannessen	41:35.6; 9:34.7; 9:28.3; 9:53.5; 12:39.1	0+5 1+7; 0+0 0+1; 0+2 1+3; 0+2 0+0; 0+1 0+3	+0.2
3rd place, bronze medalist(s)	5	Russia; Ekaterina Ponedelko; Egor Tutmin; Ekaterina Ponedelko; Egor Tutmin	41:50.3; 10:42.9; 8:43.4; 10:06.2; 12:17.8	0+3 3+10; 0+0 3+3; 0+3 0+2; 0+0 0+2; 0+0 0+3	+14.9
4	2	France; Lou Jeanmonnot-Laurent; Emilien Claude; Lou Jeanmonnot-Laurent; Emilien Claude	41:50.3; 9:42.7; 9:28.5; 9:48.5; 12:50.6	0+1 3+7; 0+0 0+1; 0+0 2+3; 0+1 0+0; 0+0 1+3	+14.9
5	1	Germany; Juliane Frühwirt; Danilo Riethmueller; Juliane Frühwirt; Danilo Riethmueller	42:05.6; 10:04.2; 8:59.0; 10:06.7; 12:55.7	0+4 3+8; 0+0 0+2; 0+0 1+3; 0+2 0+0; 0+2 2+3	+30.2
6	13	United States; Chloe Levins; Vaclav Cervenka; Chloe Levins; Vaclav Cervenka	42:29.2; 9:54.2; 8:54.8; 10:09.7; 13:30.5	0+2 1+6; 0+1 0+0; 0+0 0+1; 0+1 0+2; 0+0 1+3	+53.8
7	10	Switzerland; Flavia Barmettler; Sebastian Stalder; Flavia Barmettler; Sebastian Stalder	42:33.9; 10:05.7; 9:02.1; 10:46.8; 12:39.3	0+1 0+8; 0+1 0+0; 0+0 0+3; 0+0 0+3; 0+0 0+2	+58.5
8	14	Sweden; Sanna Sjödén; Henning Sjokvist; Sanna Sjödén; Henning Sjokvist	42:58.7; 9:41.5; 10:25.2; 9:42.6; 13:09.4	4+8 0+7; 0+2 0+1; 4+3 0+2; 0+2 0+1; 0+1 0+3	+1:23.3
9	6	Ukraine; Khrystyna Dmytrenko; Serhiy Telen; Khrystyna Dmytrenko; Serhiy Telen	43:10.7; 9:54.6; 8:51.5; 10:23.3; 14:01.3	1+4 3+10; 0+0 0+2; 0+1 0+2; 0+0 1+3; 1+3 2+3	+1:35.3
10	19	Finland; Jenni Keranen; Tuomas Harjula; Jenni Keranen; Tuomas Harjula	43:12.7; 10:16.3; 8:20.2; 11:19.5; 13:16.7	0+6 1+9; 0+1 0+2; 0+0 0+1; 0+3 1+3; 0+2 0+3	+1:37.3
11	9	Italy; Samuela Comola; Patrick Braunhofer; Samuela Comola; Patrick Braunhofer	43:32.7; 9:37.4; 9:09.7; 12:04.6; 12:41.0	2+9 1+4; 0+0 0+0; 1+3 0+1; 1+3 1+3; 0+3 0+0	+1:57.3
12	3	Czech Republic; Tereza Vinklárková; Jakub Štvrtecký; Tereza Vinklárková; Jakub Štvrtecký	43:34.0; 9:52.0; 9:38.9; 11:29.2; 12:33.9	1+7 2+9; 0+1 0+1; 0+2 1+3; 1+3 1+3; 0+1 0+2	+1:58.6
13	11	Canada; Tekarra Banser; Ben Churchill; Tekarra Banser; Ben Churchill	44:58.4; 11:17.6; 8:46.0; 11:48.9; 13:05.9	2+6 0+4; 0+2 0+3; 0+0 0+0; 2+3 0+1; 0+1 0+0	+3:23.0
14	7	Belarus; Natallia Karnitskaya; Kiryl Tsiuryn; Natallia Karnitskaya; Kiryl Tsiuryn	45:06.5; 10:26.3; 9:28.3; 12:12.4; 12:59.5	3+9 1+8; 0+3 0+1; 0+3 0+2; 3+3 1+3; 0+0 0+2	+3:31.1
15	21	Romania; Márton Enikő; Daniel Munteanu; Márton Enikő; Daniel Munteanu	45:07.4; 10:57.9; 10:01.1; 10:36.4; 13:32.0	1+10 3+8; 0+2 2+3; 0+2 1+3; 1+3 0+1; 0+3 0+1	+3:32.0
16	15	Slovakia; Henrieta Horvátová; Matej Lepeň; Henrieta Horvátová; Matej Lepeň	45:22.1; 10:15.1; 9:37.2; 12:01.5; 13:28.3	1+4 1+9; 0+0 0+0; 0+0 1+3; 1+3 0+3; 0+1 0+3	+3:46.7
17	17	Kazakhstan; Arina Pantova; Ivan Darin; Arina Pantova; Ivan Darin	45:25.2; 9:55.0; 10:09.7; 10:55.2; 14:25.3	3+7 6+11; 0+1 0+3; 3+3 0+2; 0+0 3+3; 0+3 3+3	+3:49.8
18	16	Bulgaria; Milena Todorova; Kristiyan Stoyanov; Milena Todorova; Kristiyan Stoyanov	45:37.4; 11:24.6; 9:23.6; 11:22.4; 13:26.8	2+8 3+8; 2+3 0+3; 0+2 0+2; 0+0 3+3; 0+3 0+0	+4:02.0
19	26	Hungary; Mirella Veres; Áron Herneczky; Mirella Veres; Áron Herneczky	45:42.0; 10:45.9; 10:17.6; 11:04.2; 13:34.3	0+7 0+9; 0+3 0+1; 0+2 0+3; 0+2 0+2; 0+0 0+3	+4:06.6
20	8	Austria; Lea Wörter; Dominic Unterweger; Lea Wörter; Dominic Unterweger	45:52.9; 10:43.6; 9:32.4; 11:59.0; 13:37.9	1+6 1+11; 0+2 0+2; 0+1 0+3; 1+3 1+3; 0+0 0+3	+4:17.5
21	12	Poland; Joanna Jakieła; Przemysław Pancerz; Joanna Jakieła; Przemysław Pancerz	46:12.3; 11:22.9; 10:37.9; 10:01.2; 14:10.3	0+8 6+9; 0+3 2+3; 0+2 3+3; 0+2 0+0; 0+1 1+3	+4:36.9
22	20	Estonia; Anneliis Viilukas; Robert Heldna; Anneliis Viilukas; Robert Heldna	47:29.8; 12:11.0; 9:40.2; 12:16.8; 13:21.8	6+9 3+9; 3+3 0+3; 0+0 2+3; 3+3 1+3; 0+3 0+0	+5:54.4
23	25	Latvia; Nora Viktorija Osīte; Ernests Loktevs; Nora Viktorija Osīte; Ernests Loktevs	47:37.3; 12:11.7; 9:21.2; 11:52.9; 14:11.5	2+8 4+10; 0+2 3+4; 0+1 0+2; 0+2 1+2; 2+3 0+2	+6:01.9
24	18	Slovenia; Tais Vozelj; Blaž Debeljak; Tais Vozelj; Blaž Debeljak	47:42.6; 10:53.8; 10:19.4; 10:21.0; 16:08.4	2+12 6+9; 0+3 1+3; 0+3 1+3; 0+3 0+0; 2+3 4+3	+6:07.2
25	22	Lithuania; Nadežda Derendiajeva; Linas Banys; Nadežda Derendiajeva; Linas Banys	48:13.7; 11:46.7; 9:22.4; 12:59.7; 14:04.9	2+9 3+9; 0+1 1+3; 0+2 0+1; 1+3 2+3; 1+3 0+2	+6:38.3
26	27	South Korea; Mariya Abe; Wang Woo-jin; Mariya Abe; Wang Woo-jin	48:34.8; 12:55.0; 9:25.9; 12:03.4; 14:10.5	0+8 4+9; 0+3 0+0; 0+1 0+3; 0+1 3+3; 0+3 1+3	+6:59.4
27	23	Australia; Darcie Morton; Jethro Mahon; Darcie Morton; Jethro Mahon	48:56.9; 11:06.4; 10:42.7; 11:09.5; 15:58.3	0+5 0+10; 0+3 0+3; 0+0 0+1; 0+2 0+3; 0+0 0+3	+7:21.5
