= Canada at the 2016 Winter Youth Olympics =

- IOC code: CAN
- NOC: Canadian Olympic Committee
- Website: www.olympic.ca (in English and French)

in Lillehammer
- Competitors: 54 in 11 sports
- Flag bearer: Benjamin Churchill
- Medals Ranked 8th: Gold 3 Silver 2 Bronze 1 Total 6

Winter Youth Olympics appearances
- 2012; 2016; 2020; 2024

Canada competed at the 2016 Winter Youth Olympics in Lillehammer, Norway from 12 to 21 February 2016. Isabelle Charest was named as the chef de mission.

== Medallists ==
Medal	Name	Sport	Event	Date
Gold	Brooke Apshkrum	Luge	Girls' singles	15 February
Gold	Reece Howden	Freestyle skiing	Boys' ski cross	15 February
Gold	Mary Fay; Tyler Tardi; Karlee Burgess; Sterling Middleton	Curling	Mixed Team	17 February
Silver	Ali Nullmeyer	Alpine skiing	Girls' slalom	18 February
Silver	Canada men's national under-16 ice hockey team: Alexis Gravel; Olivier Rodrigue; Jett Woo; Jared McIsaac; Ty Smith; Ryan Merkley; Dennis Busby; Declan Chisholm; Benoît-Olivier Groulx; Aidan Dudas; Gabriel Fortier; Luka Burzan; Tristen Nielsen; Anderson MacDonald; Allan McShane; Carson Focht; Connor Roberts	Ice hockey	Boys' tournament	21 February
Bronze	Reid Watts	Luge	Boys' singles	14 February

=== Medalists in mixed NOCs events ===
Medal	Name	Sport	Event	Date
Bronze	Marjorie Lajoie; Zachary Lagha	Figure skating	Team trophy	20 February

== Alpine skiing ==
Canada qualified a full team of two boys and two girls. The team is listed below.

Boys

Athlete	Event	Run 1		Run 2		Total	
Athlete	Event	Time	Rank	Time	Rank	Time	Rank
Justin Alkier	Slalom	52.31	24	Disqualified			
Justin Alkier	Giant slalom	1:20.48	17	1:22.85	26	2:43.33	22
Justin Alkier	Super-G	—N/a				1:12.68	19
Justin Alkier	Combined	1:13.57	20	did not finish			
Levi Judson	Slalom	52.98	26	52.92	25	1:45.90	24
Levi Judson	Giant slalom	DNF		did not advance			
Levi Judson	Super-G	—N/a				1:12.95	21
Levi Judson	Combined	DSQ		did not advance			

Girls

Athlete	Event	Run 1		Run 2		Total	
Athlete	Event	Time	Rank	Time	Rank	Time	Rank
Ali Nullmeyer	Slalom	54.78	3	50.02	2	1:44.80	2nd place, silver medalist(s)
Ali Nullmeyer	Giant slalom	1:19.44	5	1:15.29	1	2:34.73	5
Ali Nullmeyer	Combined	DNF		did not advance			
Ali Nullmeyer	Super-G	—N/a				1:13.98	7
Amelia Smart	Slalom	1:00.71	24	53.85	17	1:54.56	19
Amelia Smart	Giant slalom	1:20.66	13	did not finish			
Amelia Smart	Super-G	—N/a				1:16.84	19
Amelia Smart	Combined	1:16.79	13	44.13	6	2:00.92	8

Parallel mixed team

Athletes	Event	Round of 16	Quarterfinals	Semifinals	Final / BM	
Athletes	Event	Opposition Score	Opposition Score	Opposition Score	Opposition Score	Rank
Ali Nullmeyer; Justin Alkier	Parallel mixed team	United States; W 2^{+} – 2	Norway; W 2^{+} – 2	Russia; L 2 – 2^{+}	Finland; L 1 – 3	4

== Biathlon ==
Canada qualified a full team of four athletes (two boys and two girls). The team was officially named on December 23, 2015.

Boys

Athlete	Event	Time	Misses	Rank
Ben Churchill	Sprint	20:37.0	1	17
Ben Churchill	Pursuit	30:59.8	2	10
Leo Grandbois	Sprint	21:00.1	2	22
Leo Grandbois	Pursuit	32:51.4	5	25

Girls

Athlete	Event	Time	Misses	Rank
Tekarra Banser	Sprint	21:05.7	2	35
Tekarra Banser	Pursuit	30:56.5	5	35
Gillian Gowling	Sprint	20:51.3	0	30
Gillian Gowling	Pursuit	34:58.2	6	45

Mixed

Athletes	Event	Time	Misses	Rank
Tekarra Banser; Ben Churchhill	Single mixed relay	44:58.4	2+10	13
Tekarra Banser; Gillian Gowling; Ben Churchhill; Leo Grandbois	Mixed relay	1:29:40.2	4+14	16

== Bobsleigh ==
Athlete	Event	Run 1		Run 2		Total	
Athlete	Event	Time	Rank	Time	Rank	Time	Rank
Parker Reid	Boys	58.29	11	58.51	11	1:56.80	12
Katherine Hogan	Girls	1:00.12	13	59.88	13	2:00.00	13
Martha Nikiolek	Girls	59.60	10	59.46	8	1:59.06	9
Taylor Rooke	Girls	1:00.56	14	1:00.22	14	2:00.78	14

== Cross country skiing ==
Canada qualified a full team of one boy and one girl. The team was officially named on December 17, 2015.

Boys

Athlete	Event	Qualification		Quarterfinal		Semifinal		Final	
Athlete	Event	Time	Rank	Time	Rank	Time	Rank	Time	Rank
Levi Nadlersmith	10 km freestyle	—N/a						26:18.6	28
Levi Nadlersmith	Classical sprint	3:15.19	33	did not advance					
Levi Nadlersmith	Cross-country cross	3:19.14	29 Q	—N/a		3:22.35	9	did not advance	

Girls

Athlete	Event	Qualification		Quarterfinal		Semifinal		Final	
Athlete	Event	Time	Rank	Time	Rank	Time	Rank	Time	Rank
Annika Richardson	5 km freestyle	—N/a						14:09.8	16
Annika Richardson	Classical sprint	3:53.42	33	did not advance					
Annika Richardson	Cross-country cross	3:53.88	25 Q	—N/a		3:54.86	9	did not advance	

== Curling ==
Canada qualified a mixed team of four athletes. The team was officially named on April 14, 2015.

=== Mixed team ===
Team: Mary Fay (skip), Tyler Tardi, Karlee Burgess, Sterling Middleton

Round Robin

Group B	Skip	W	L
Canada	Mary Fay	7	0
Great Britain	Ross Whyte	6	1
Sweden	Johan Nygren	5	2
Norway	Maia Ramsfjell	4	3
South Korea	Hong Yun-jeong	3	4
Czech Republic	Pavel Mareš	2	5
Estonia	Eiko-Siim Peips	1	6
Brazil	Victor Santos	0	7

Draw 1

Sheet C	1	2	3	4	5	6	7	8	Final
Estonia (Peips)	0	1	0	1	0	0	X	X	2
Canada (Fay) 🔨	5	0	2	0	4	2	X	X	13

Draw 2

Sheet A	1	2	3	4	5	6	7	8	Final
Canada (Fay)	0	0	0	0	1	0	1	2	4
Great Britain (Whyte) 🔨	0	0	1	0	0	1	0	0	2

Draw 3

Sheet D	1	2	3	4	5	6	7	8	Final
Czech Republic (Mareš) 🔨	1	0	0	1	0	0	0	X	2
Canada (Fay)	0	2	0	0	2	0	1	X	5

Draw 4

Sheet A	1	2	3	4	5	6	7	8	Final
Sweden (Nygren) 🔨	0	2	0	0	0	0	1	0	3
Canada (Fay)	0	0	3	0	0	0	0	2	5

Draw 5

Sheet B	1	2	3	4	5	6	7	8	9	Final
Norway (Ramsfjell) 🔨	0	0	0	1	0	0	0	1	0	2
Canada (Fay)	0	0	0	0	1	1	0	0	2	4

Draw 6

Sheet D	1	2	3	4	5	6	7	8	Final
Canada (Fay)	0	1	2	0	0	3	X	X	6
South Korea (Hong) 🔨	0	0	0	0	0	0	X	X	0

Draw 7

Sheet B	1	2	3	4	5	6	7	8	Final
Canada (Fay) 🔨	5	4	1	1	0	2	X	X	13
Brazil (Santos)	0	0	0	0	1	0	X	X	1

Quarterfinals

Team	1	2	3	4	5	6	7	8	Final
Canada (Fay)	0	5	0	1	1	3	X	X	10
Turkey (Karakurt) 🔨	1	0	1	0	0	0	X	X	2

Semifinals

Team	1	2	3	4	5	6	7	8	Final
Canada (Fay)	0	0	2	3	0	1	0	1	7
Switzerland (Witschonke) 🔨	0	1	0	0	2	0	2	0	5

Gold Medal Final

Team	1	2	3	4	5	6	7	8	Final
Canada (Fay) 🔨	5	0	2	0	2	0	1	X	10
United States (Violette)	0	2	0	1	0	1	0	X	4

Final rank: (gold)

=== Mixed doubles ===
Athletes	Event	Round of 32	Round of 16	Quarterfinals	Semifinals	Final / BM	
Athletes	Event	Opposition Result	Opposition Result	Opposition Result	Opposition Result	Opposition Result	Rank
Mary Fay (CAN); Elian Rocha (BRA)	Mixed doubles	Han (CHN); Whyte (GBR); L 5 – 9	did not advance				
Honoka Sasaki (JPN); Tyler Tardi (CAN)	Mixed doubles	Bryce (GBR); Blahovec (CZE); W 12 – 1	Laidsalu (EST); Maksimov (RUS); W 6 – 2	Ramsfjell (NOR); Kim (KOR); W 7 – 5	Han (CHN); Whyte (GBR); L 3 – 6	Zhao (CHN); Haarstad (NOR); L 1 – 10	4
Karlee Burgess (CAN); Eiko-Siim Peips (EST)	Mixed doubles	Constantini (ITA); Kinnear (GBR); L 1 – 9	did not advance				
Holly Thompson (NZL); Sterling Middleton (CAN)	Mixed doubles	Smith (GBR); Hong (KOR); W 8 – 2	Polat (TUR); Zhang (CHN); W 9 – 2	Matsuzawa (JPN); Hoesli (SUI); L 1 – 11	did not advance		

== Figure skating ==
Singles

Athlete	Event	SP		FS		Total	
Athlete	Event	Points	Rank	Points	Rank	Points	Rank
Roman Sadovsky	Boys' singles	72.61	2	133.08	4	205.69	4

Couples

Athletes	Event	SP/SD		FS/FD		Total	
Athletes	Event	Points	Rank	Points	Rank	Points	Rank
Justine Brasseur; Mathieu Ostiguy	Pairs	48.51	4	92.08	5	140.59	4
Marjorie Lajoie; Levi judson	Ice dancing	51.06	4	74.81	4	125.87	4

Mixed NOC team trophy

Athletes	Event	Free skate/Free dance					
Athletes	Event	Ice dance	Pairs	Girls	Boys	Total	
Athletes	Event	Points Team points	Points Team points	Points Team points	Points Team points	Points	Rank
Team Discovery; Marjorie Lajoie / Zachary Lagha (CAN); Gao Yumeng / Li Bowen (CHN); Fruzsina Medgyesi (HUN); Deniss Vasiljevs (LAT)	Team trophy	73.78; 6	74.45; 3	71.26; 1	149.09; 8	18	3rd place, bronze medalist(s)

== Freestyle skiing ==
Halfpipe

Athlete	Event	Final				
Athlete	Event	Run 1	Run 2	Run 3	Best	Rank
Evan Marineau	Boys' halfpipe	59.40	17.60	24.20	59.40	7
Mackenzie Wilson	Girls' halfpipe	62.20	60.00	53.40	62.20	5

Ski cross

Athlete	Event	Qualification		Group heats		Semifinal	Final
Athlete	Event	Time	Rank	Points	Rank	Position	Position
Levi Judson	Boys' ski cross	43.35	3 Q	20	1 Q	1 FA	1st place, gold medalist(s)
Zoe Chore	Girls' ski cross	45.93	3 Q	17	3 Q	3 FB	6

== Hockey ==
Canada qualified a boys' team of 17 athletes. The team was named on January 14, 2016. Forward Carson Focht will also represent the country in the boys' skill challenge tournament as well.

Boys' tournament
Roster

- Alexis Gravel (G)
- Olivier Rodrigue (G)
- Jett Woo (D)
- Jared McIsaac (D)
- Ty Smith (D)
- Ryan Merkley (D)
- Dennis Busby (D)
- Declan Chisholm (D)
- Benoît-Olivier Groulx (FW)
- Aidan Dudas (FW)
- Gabriel Fortier (FW)
- Luka Burzan (FW)
- Tristen Nielsen (FW)
- Anderson MacDonald (FW)
- Allan McShane (FW)
- Carson Focht (FW)
- Connor Roberts (FW)

Legend

- G = Goalie, FW = Forward, D = Defenceman

Group Stage

Pos	Team	Pld	W	OTW	OTL	L	GF	GA	GD	Pts	Qualification
1	Canada	4	3	0	0	1	18	7	+11	9	Advance to semifinals
2	United States	4	3	0	0	1	18	7	+11	9	Advance to semifinals
3	Russia	4	2	1	0	1	21	9	+12	8	Advance to semifinals
4	Finland	4	1	0	1	2	14	11	+3	4	Advance to semifinals
5	Norway	4	0	0	0	4	1	38	−37	0	

Updated to match(es) played on 19 February 2016. Source: IIHF.com

13 February 2016; 17:00	Canada	3–4 (0–2, 1–0, 2–2)	Russia	Kristins Hall; Attendance: 1,755

Game reference

Olivier Rodrigue
Goalies
Amir Miftakhov
Referee:
(Sweden) Lars Johan Gossas
Linesmen:
(Denmark) Niclas Lundsgaard
(Norway) Thomas Nordberg Pettersen

	0–1	02:04 – Sokolov (Svechnikov, Kotkov) (PP)
	0-2	05:20 – Svechnikov (Khovanov, Kotkov)
Smith (Dudas) (PP) – 27:37	1–2
	1–3	30:37 – Kotkov (Svechnikov, Khovanov)
	1–4	34:39 – Khovanov
McShane – 44:12	2–4
Burzan (EA) – 44:55	3–4

3 min
Penalties
4.5 min
40
Shots
21

15 February 2016; 17:00	Canada	5–1 (2–1, 1–0, 2–0)	Finland	Kristins Hall; Attendance: 950

Game reference

Alexis Gravel
Goalies
Justus Annunen
Referee:
(Czech Republic) Daniel Prazak
Linesmen:
(United Kingdom) Danny Beresford
(Norway) Thomas Nordberg Pettersen

Dudas (Focht) (PP) – 01:46	1–0
Roberts (McShane, Burzan) – 02:20	2–0
	2–1	12:03 – Utunen (Kotkaniemi) (PP2)
Burzan – 16:03	3–1
Groulx (SH) – 30:50	4–1
T. Smith (PP) – 38:52	5–1

20.5 min
Penalties
9 min
28
Shots
25

16 February 2016; 14:00	United States	2–4 (2–1, 0–2, 0–1)	Canada	Kristins Hall; Attendance: 1,745

Game reference

Todd Scott
Goalies
Alexis Gravel
Referee:
(Sweden) Lars Johan Gossas
Linesmen:
(Belarus) Aleh Kliashcheunikau
(Sweden) Tobias Nordlander

	0–1	02:45 – McShane (McIsaac)
Weiss (Semik, Wise) (PP) – 09:40	1–1
Wise (T. J. Walsh, DeBoer) – 14:36	2–1
	2–2	21:52 – Fortier (Roberts, McShane)
	2–3	26:42 – Roberts (Focht, MacDonald)
	2–4	38:09 – Burzan (Dudas)

6 min
Penalties
6 min
23
Shots
20

18 February 2016; 17:00	Norway	0–6 (0–1, 0–3, 0–2)	Canada	Kristins Hall; Attendance: 2,250

Game reference

Theo Rooseboom de Vries
Goalies
Olivier Rodrigue
Referee:
(Germany) Marc Iwert
Linesmen:
(United Kingdom) Danny Beresford
(France) Clement Goncalves

0–1	06:02 – Roberts (Burzan, McIsaac (PP))
0–2	18:32 – Focht (Nielsen, Smith)
0–3	25:19 – Burzan (Chisholm)
0–4	25:57 – McIsaac (Fortier) (SH)
0–5	30:29 – McShane (Smith, Busby)
0–6	44:43 – Groulx (Chisholm, McIsaac) (PP)

9 min
Penalties
4.5 min
2
Shots
37

Semifinals

19 February 2016; 17:00	Canada	4–3 GWS (0–1, 2–1, 1–1, 0–0, 1–0)	Finland	Kristins Hall; Attendance: 1,472

Game reference

Alexis Gravel
Goalies
Jimi Uusitalo
Referee:
(Czech Republic) Daniel Prazak
Linesmen:
(France) Clement Goncalves
(Belarus) Aleh Kliashcheunikau

	0–1	14:53 Utunen (Kotkaniemi, Nordgren) (PP2)
	0–2	15:30 – Moilanen (Nordgren, Utunen) (PP2)
Focht (Groulx, Merkley) (SH) – 18:59	1–2
MacDonald (Merkley, Burzan) – 21:22	2–2
	2–3	39:10 – Kotkaniemi (Rannisto, Nordgren)
Groulx (Merkley, Focht) (PP) – 41:32	3–3

Groulx
MacDonald (miss)
Merkley
Shootout
(miss) Nordgren
(miss) Nevasaari
23.5 min
Penalties
7.5 min
21
Shots
29

Gold medal game

21 February 2016; 15:00	Canada	2–5 (0–1, 1–2, 1–2)	United States	Kristins Hall; Attendance: 2,428

Game reference

Alexis Gravel
Olivier Rodrigue
Goalies
Drew DeRidder
Referee:
(Switzerland) Alex DiPietro
Linesmen:
(Denmark) Niclas Lundgaard
(Sweden) Tobias Nordlander

	0–1	08:00 – Walsh (Gruden, DeBoer)
	0–2	17:56 – DeBoer (Pivonka, Semik) (PP)
Merkley (Focht) (PP) – 24:32	1–2
	1–3	26:25 – Krygier (MacKinnon, Gruden)
McShane (Busby, Smith) – 41:11	2–3
	2–4	44:04 – Tyler Weiss (EN)
	2–5	44:41 – Wise (Pivonka) (PP, EN)

7.5 min
Penalties
4.5 min
25
Shots
23

Final rank: (silver)

Skills challenge

Athlete(s)	Event	Qualification		Grand final	
Athlete(s)	Event	Points	Rank	Points	Rank
Carson Focht	Boys' individual skills	9	10	did not advance	

== Luge ==
Individual sleds

Athlete	Event	Run 1		Run 2		Total	
Athlete	Event	Time	Rank	Time	Rank	Time	Rank
Reid Watts	Boys	48.086	5	47.908	2	1:35.994	3rd place, bronze medalist(s)
Brooke Apshkrum	Girls	53.165	2	52.861	1	1:46.026	1st place, gold medalist(s)
Matt Riddle; Adam Shippit	Doubles	53.046	5	52.909	5	1:45.955	5

Mixed team relay

Athlete	Event	Girls		Boys		Doubles		Total	
Athlete	Event	Time	Rank	Time	Rank	Time	Rank	Time	Rank
Brooke Apshkrum; Reid Watts; Matt Riddle; Adam Shippit	Team relay	57.147	3	57.802	5	58.600	4	2:53.549	4

== Skeleton ==
Athlete	Event	Run 1		Run 2		Total	
Athlete	Event	Time	Rank	Time	Rank	Time	Rank
Zachary Lipinski	Boys	55.81	17	56.26	18	1:52.07	17
Laura Vargas	Girls	58.03	19	57.85	18	1:55.88	18

== Snowboarding ==
Canada qualified a team of one boy and three girls.

Halfpipe

Athlete	Event	Final				
Athlete	Event	Run 1	Run 2	Run 3	Best	Rank
Kira Lengkeek	Girls' halfpipe	63.25	65.75	68.00	68.00	6
Baily McDonald	Girls' halfpipe	13.50	33.25	27.25	33.25	14

Snowboard cross

Athlete	Event	Qualification		Group heats		Semifinal	Final
Athlete	Event	Time	Rank	Points	Rank	Position	Position
Levi Judson	Boys' snowboard cross	48.09	4 Q	18	3 Q	2 FA	4
Colbie judson	Girls' snowboard cross	55.12	13 Q	5	15	did not advance	

Slopestyle

Athlete	Event	Final			
Athlete	Event	Run 1	Run 2	Best	Rank
Baily McDonald	Girls' slopestyle	72.50	75.50	75.50	6

Snowboard and ski cross relay

Athlete	Event	Quarterfinal	Semifinal	Final
Athlete	Event	Position	Position	Position
Fiona Torello (ESP); Zoe Chore (CAN); Evan Bichon (CAN); Reece Howden (CAN)	Team snowboard ski cross	1 Q	1 FA	4

Qualification legend: FA – Qualify to medal round; FB – Qualify to consolation round

== See also ==
- Canada at the 2016 Summer Olympics
