= Snowboarding at the 2016 Winter Youth Olympics – Girls' halfpipe =

Girls' halfpipe at the II Winter Youth Olympic Games
- Venue: Hafjell Freepark
- Dates: 14 February
- Competitors: 16 from 11 nations
- Winning points: 96.50

Medalists
1st place, gold medalist(s)		Chloe Kim	United States
2nd place, silver medalist(s)		Emily Arthur	Australia
3rd place, bronze medalist(s)		Jeong Yu-rim	South Korea

The girls' halfpipe event at the 2016 Winter Youth Olympics took place on 14 February at the Hafjell Freepark.

== Results ==
The final was started at 9:40.

Rank	Bib	Name	Country	Run 1	Run 2	Run 3	Best
1st place, gold medalist(s)	1	Chloe Kim	United States	94.25	96.50	96.25	96.50
2nd place, silver medalist(s)	2	Emily Arthur	Australia	87.25	90.00	63.00	90.00
3rd place, bronze medalist(s)	3	Jeong Yu-rim	South Korea	82.25	84.50	42.25	84.50
4	5	Junna Asaya	Japan	78.25	70.00	80.75	80.75
5	10	Wu Shaotong	China	74.75	27.75	21.50	74.75
6	8	Kira Lengkeek	Canada	63.25	65.75	68.00	68.00
7	9	Henna Ikola	Finland	62.25	60.75	23.75	62.25
8	11	Elli Pikkujämsä	Finland	59.50	53.00	47.25	59.50
9	14	Hailey Langland	United States	39.75	52.50	56.00	56.00
10	4	Kaja Verdnik	Slovenia	50.75	47.00	52.50	52.50
11	7	Thalie Larochaix	France	45.25	26.50	44.75	45.25
12	6	Eva Kralj	Slovenia	40.00	15.00	25.25	40.00
13	12	Ariane Burri	Switzerland	36.25	38.25	35.75	38.25
14	17	Baily McDonald	Canada	13.50	33.25	27.25	33.25
15	13	Mahalah Mullins	Australia	26.50	27.25	23.00	27.25
16	16	Nora Frisvold	Norway	26.00	22.25	23.75	26.00
	15	Hanne Eilertsen	Norway	Did not start			
