= Snowboarding at the 2016 Winter Youth Olympics – Girls' slopestyle =

Girls' slopestyle at the II Winter Youth Olympic Games
- Venue: Hafjell Freepark
- Dates: 19 February
- Competitors: 17 from 11 nations
- Winning points: 88.25

Medalists
1st place, gold medalist(s)		Chloe Kim	United States
2nd place, silver medalist(s)		Elli Pikkujämsä	Finland
3rd place, bronze medalist(s)		Henna Ikola	Finland

The girls' slopestyle event at the 2016 Winter Youth Olympics took place on 19 February at the Hafjell Freepark.

== Results ==
The final was started at 10:10.

Rank	Bib	Name	Country	Run 1	Run 2	Best
1st place, gold medalist(s)	10	Chloe Kim	United States	87.50	88.25	88.25
2nd place, silver medalist(s)	4	Elli Pikkujämsä	Finland	82.25	81.25	82.25
3rd place, bronze medalist(s)	6	Henna Ikola	Finland	38.00	79.25	79.25
4	2	Chloé Sillieres	France	41.00	79.00	79.00
5	5	Mahalah Mullins	Australia	25.75	76.75	76.75
6	14	Baily McDonald	Canada	72.50	75.50	75.50
7	9	Thalie Larochaix	France	57.75	65.50	65.50
8	1	Hailey Langland	United States	64.25	55.75	64.25
9	3	Sofya Fyodorova	Russia	63.00	41.00	63.00
10	8	Antonia Yañez	Chile	26.25	61.75	61.75
11	18	Manon Suffys	Belgium	21.25	53.75	53.75
12	16	Nora Frisvold	Norway	46.50	31.50	46.50
13	13	Darina Murawskaia	Belarus	45.75	23.50	45.75
14	17	Emily Arthur	Australia	44.50	20.25	44.50
15	12	Kaja Verdnik	Slovenia	34.75	26.50	34.75
16	15	Hanne Eilertsen	Norway	33.50	19.00	33.50
17	7	Eva Kralj	Slovenia	12.00	19.50	19.50
	11	Ariane Burri	Switzerland	Did not start		
