= Biathlon at the 2016 Winter Youth Olympics – Boys' pursuit =

Boys' pursuit at the II Winter Youth Olympic Games
- Venue: Birkebeineren Ski Stadium
- Date: 15 February
- Competitors: 50 from 31 nations
- Winning time: 28:10.7

Medalists
1st place, gold medalist(s)		Sivert Bakken	Norway
2nd place, silver medalist(s)		Egor Tutmin	Russia
3rd place, bronze medalist(s)		Said Karimulla Khalili	Russia

The boys' 10 km pursuit biathlon competition at the 2016 Winter Youth Olympics was held on 15 February at the Birkebeineren Ski Stadium.

== Results ==
The race was started at 11:00.

Rank	Bib	Name	Country	Start	Time	Penalties (P+P+S+S)	Deficit
1st place, gold medalist(s)	2	Sivert Bakken	Norway	0:07	28:10.7	4 (1+1+1+1)	–
2nd place, silver medalist(s)	3	Egor Tutmin	Russia	0:18	29:21.4	5 (0+1+3+1)	+1:10.7
3rd place, bronze medalist(s)	6	Said Karimulla Khalili	Russia	0:45	29:28.4	4 (1+1+1+1)	+1:17.7
4	9	Patrick Braunhofer	Italy	0:55	30:01.5	4 (3+0+1+0)	+1:50.8
5	1	Emilien Claude	France	0:00	30:29.3	6 (1+1+2+2)	+2:18.6
6	7	Danilo Riethmüller	Germany	0:49	30:30.3	6 (1+1+3+1)	+2:19.6
7	11	Tuomas Harjula	Finland	1:06	30:44.5	4 (2+1+1+0)	+2:33.8
8	15	Serhiy Telen	Ukraine	1:32	30:52.6	4 (1+1+1+1)	+2:41.9
9	5	Robert Heldna	Estonia	0:36	30:55.9	6 (4+0+1+1)	+2:45.2
10	17	Ben Churchill	Canada	1:36	30:59.8	2 (1+1+0+0)	+2:49.1
11	10	Sebastian Stalder	Switzerland	0:56	31:06.9	5 (1+1+1+2)	+2:56.2
12	4	Fredrik Bucher-Johannessen	Norway	0:28	31:09.5	8 (2+4+1+1)	+2:58.8
13	16	Jakub Štvrtecký	Czech Republic	1:35	31:21.9	6 (1+2+3+0)	+3:11.2
14	28	Kiryl Tsiuryn	Belarus	2:22	31:29.2	3 (0+0+1+2)	+3:18.5
15	27	Przemysław Pancerz	Poland	2:14	31:31.1	3 (0+1+0+2)	+3:20.4
16	32	Zhu Zhenyu	China	2:32	31:45.7	3 (1+1+1+0)	+3:35.0
17	12	Kristiyan Stoyanov	Bulgaria	1:06	31:47.4	6 (0+1+3+2)	+3:36.7
18	8	Aliaksandr Matskevich	Belarus	0:52	31:54.4	7 (3+3+1+0)	+3:43.7
19	34	Dominik Unterweger	Austria	2:44	31:57.4	0 (0+0+0+0)	+3:46.7
20	36	Vaclav Cervenka	United States	2:51	32:04.9	1 (0+0+0+1)	+3:54.2
21	18	Simon Groß	Germany	1:48	32:15.5	4 (0+0+1+3)	+4:04.8
22	14	Vítězslav Hornig	Czech Republic	1:30	32:48.0	7 (3+0+2+2)	+4:37.3
23	21	Henning Sjökvist	Sweden	1:54	32:50.1	7 (2+1+2+2)	+4:39.4
24	30	Matej Lepeň	Slovakia	2:25	32:50.7	4 (0+0+3+1)	+4:40.0
25	22	Léo Grandbois	Canada	1:59	32:51.4	5 (1+0+1+3)	+4:40.7
26	20	Otto-Eemil Karvinen	Finland	1:53	32:51.7	6 (2+1+2+1)	+4:41.0
27	24	Daniel Munteanu	Romania	2:01	33:13.9	6 (1+1+2+2)	+5:03.2
28	19	Miroslav Pavlák	Slovakia	1:51	33:20.4	7 (2+0+2+3)	+5:09.7
29	23	Pierre Monney	France	2:00	33:31.0	8 (3+3+2+0)	+5:20.3
30	35	Petar Velchev	Bulgaria	2:46	33:37.1	5 (2+1+0+2)	+5:26.4
31	13	Linas Banys	Lithuania	1:28	33:43.2	7 (2+3+0+2)	+5:32.5
32	25	Cedric Christille	Italy	2:02	34:04.1	8 (1+3+2+2)	+5:53.4
33	31	Emil Simonsson	Sweden	2:31	34:22.0	9 (1+2+3+3)	+6:11.3
34	38	Wang Woo-jin	South Korea	2:55	34:31.3	5 (0+3+1+1)	+6:20.6
35	40	Áron Herneczky	Hungary	3:03	34:38.9	2 (1+1+0+0)	+6:28.2
36	33	Mart Všivtsev	Estonia	2:34	34:40.7	7 (4+1+2+0)	+6:30.0
37	29	Nico Salutt	Switzerland	2:23	35:03.8	10 (3+2+3+2)	+6:53.1
38	37	Wojciech Filip	Poland	2:53	35:05.1	8 (1+1+4+2)	+6:54.4
39	26	Ivan Darin	Kazakhstan	2:05	35:16.3	10 (3+1+3+3)	+7:05.6
40	43	Yurii Sytnyk	Ukraine	3:43	35:22.6	7 (1+1+2+3)	+7:11.9
41	41	Ernests Loktevs	Latvia	3:26	35:48.0	4 (2+0+1+1)	+7:37.3
42	44	Blaž Debeljak	Slovenia	3:54	35:59.7	6 (1+3+0+2)	+7:49.0
43	42	Mislav Petrović	Croatia	3:41	36:21.2	5 (2+1+1+1)	+8:10.5
44	45	Klemen Vampelj	Slovenia	3:54	36:22.6	5 (2+0+2+1)	+8:11.9
45	46	Eli Nielsen	United States	3:58	36:24.1	6 (0+2+2+2)	+8:13.4
46	39	Markus Ortner	Austria	2:59	38:02.7	8 (3+1+3+1)	+9:52.0
47	49	Nikolaos Mavridis	Greece	7:45	42:18.3	3 (0+1+1+1)	+14:07.6
48	48	Tim De Ridder	Belgium	7:10	43:00.9	2 (0+0+2+0)	+14:50.2
49	47	Boris Škipina	Bosnia and Herzegovina	5:12	43:51.0	11 (3+2+3+3)	+15:40.3
50	50	Jethro Mahon	Australia	8:19	46:24.0	6 (0+1+2+3)	+18:13.3
