= Biathlon at the 2016 Winter Youth Olympics – Boys' sprint =

Boys' sprint at the II Winter Youth Olympic Games
- Venue: Birkebeineren Ski Stadium
- Date: 14 February
- Competitors: 50 from 31 nations
- Winning time: 19:01.5

Medalists
1st place, gold medalist(s)		Emilien Claude	France
2nd place, silver medalist(s)		Sivert Bakken	Norway
3rd place, bronze medalist(s)		Egor Tutmin	Russia

The boys' 7.5 km sprint biathlon competition at the 2016 Winter Youth Olympics was held on 14 February at the Birkebeineren Ski Stadium.

== Results ==
The race was started at 12:15.

Rank	Bib	Name	Country	Time	Penalties (P+S)	Deficit
1st place, gold medalist(s)	47	Emilien Claude	France	19:01.5	0 (0+0)	–
2nd place, silver medalist(s)	15	Sivert Bakken	Norway	19:08.6	2 (1+1)	+7.1
3rd place, bronze medalist(s)	40	Egor Tutmin	Russia	19:19.5	2 (0+2)	+18.0
4	44	Fredrik Bucher-Johannessen	Norway	19:29.1	2 (2+0)	+27.6
5	22	Robert Heldna	Estonia	19:37.0	1 (0+1)	+35.5
6	1	Said Karimulla Khalili	Russia	19:46.1	2 (1+1)	+44.6
7	30	Danilo Riethmüller	Germany	19:50.1	3 (1+2)	+48.6
8	39	Aliaksandr Matskevich	Belarus	19:53.0	1 (1+0)	+51.5
9	12	Patrick Braunhofer	Italy	19:56.7	2 (0+2)	+55.2
10	28	Sebastian Stalder	Switzerland	19:57.9	0 (0+0)	+56.4
11	20	Tuomas Harjula	Finland	20:07.7	2 (1+1)	+1:06.2
12	25	Kristiyan Stoyanov	Bulgaria	20:07.8	2 (0+2)	+1:06.3
13	8	Linas Banys	Lithuania	20:29.9	1 (0+1)	+1:28.4
14	43	Vítězslav Hornig	Czech Republic	20:31.4	2 (0+2)	+1:29.9
15	32	Serhiy Telen	Ukraine	20:33.1	3 (1+2)	+1:31.6
16	6	Jakub Štvrtecký	Czech Republic	20:36.0	3 (0+3)	+1:34.5
17	50	Ben Churchill	Canada	20:37.0	1 (1+0)	+1:35.5
18	5	Simon Groß	Germany	20:49.1	3 (2+1)	+1:47.6
19	16	Miroslav Pavlák	Slovakia	20:52.8	1 (0+1)	+1:51.3
20	34	Otto-Eemil Karvinen	Finland	20:54.2	2 (1+1)	+1:52.7
21	49	Henning Sjökvist	Sweden	20:55.7	2 (2+0)	+1:54.2
22	3	Léo Grandbois	Canada	21:00.1	2 (0+2)	+1:58.6
23	26	Pierre Monney	France	21:01.9	3 (0+3)	+2:00.4
24	11	Daniel Munteanu	Romania	21:02.1	2 (1+1)	+2:00.6
25	31	Cedric Christille	Italy	21:03.4	2 (0+2)	+2:01.9
26	36	Ivan Darin	Kazakhstan	21:06.6	3 (2+1)	+2:05.1
27	42	Przemysław Pancerz	Poland	21:15.6	3 (1+2)	+2:14.1
28	23	Kiryl Tsiuryn	Belarus	21:23.2	4 (1+3)	+2:21.7
29	46	Nico Salutt	Switzerland	21:24.1	4 (2+2)	+2:22.6
30	37	Matej Lepeň	Slovakia	21:26.1	2 (1+1)	+2:24.6
31	10	Emil Simonsson	Sweden	21:32.2	5 (1+4)	+2:30.7
32	19	Zhu Zhenyu	China	21:33.1	3 (2+1)	+2:31.6
33	45	Mart Všivtsev	Estonia	21:35.8	4 (2+2)	+2:34.3
34	35	Dominik Unterweger	Austria	21:45.2	2 (1+1)	+2:43.7
35	29	Petar Velchev	Bulgaria	21:47.5	4 (2+2)	+2:46.0
36	24	Vaclav Cervenka	United States	21:52.2	4 (1+3)	+2:50.7
37	27	Wojciech Filip	Poland	21:54.7	4 (1+3)	+2:53.2
38	9	Wang Woo-jin	South Korea	21:56.1	4 (0+4)	+2:54.6
39	13	Markus Ortner	Austria	22:00.8	3 (1+2)	+2:59.3
40	21	Áron Herneczky	Hungary	22:04.5	1 (1+0)	+3:03.0
41	38	Ernests Loktevs	Latvia	22:27.5	3 (1+2)	+3:26.0
42	2	Mislav Petrović	Croatia	22:42.9	5 (3+2)	+3:41.4
43	14	Yurii Sytnyk	Ukraine	22:44.3	7 (3+4)	+3:42.8
44	33	Blaž Debeljak	Slovenia	22:55.7	7 (4+3)	+3:54.2
45	7	Klemen Vampelj	Slovenia	22:55.9	4 (3+1)	+3:54.4
46	41	Eli Nielsen	United States	22:59.6	6 (2+4)	+3:58.1
47	18	Boris Škupina	Bosnia and Herzegovina	24:13.4	5 (3+2)	+5:11.9
48	48	Tim De Ridder	Belgium	26:11.4	6 (4+2)	+7:09.9
49	4	Nikolaos Mavridis	Greece	26:46.7	7 (3+4)	+7:45.2
50	17	Jethro Mahon	Australia	27:20.8	5 (2+3)	+8:19.3
