= Biathlon at the 2016 Winter Youth Olympics – Girls' pursuit =

Girls' pursuit at the II Winter Youth Olympic Games
- Venue: Birkebeineren Ski Stadium
- Date: 15 February
- Competitors: 49 from 29 nations
- Winning time: 25:12.9

Medalists
1st place, gold medalist(s)		Khrystyna Dmytrenko	Ukraine
2nd place, silver medalist(s)		Marthe Kråkstad Johansen	Norway
3rd place, bronze medalist(s)		Lou Jeanmonnot-Laurent	France

The girls' 7.5 km pursuit biathlon competition at the 2016 Winter Youth Olympics was held on 15 February at the Birkebeineren Ski Stadium.

== Results ==
The race was started at 13:15.

Rank	Bib	Name	Country	Start	Time	Penalties (P+P+S+S)	Deficit
1st place, gold medalist(s)	4	Khrystyna Dmytrenko	Ukraine	0:23	25:12.9	2 (2+0+0+0)	–
2nd place, silver medalist(s)	2	Marthe Kråkstad Johansen	Norway	0:06	25:20.4	4 (2+0+1+1)	+7.5
3rd place, bronze medalist(s)	5	Lou Jeanmonnot-Laurent	France	0:29	25:20.5	2 (0+0+1+1)	+7.6
4	22	Chloe Levins	United States	1:33	25:47.6	0 (0+0+0+0)	+34.7
5	6	Samuela Comola	Italy	0:32	25:58.5	1 (0+1+0+0)	+45.6
6	9	Meng Fanqi	China	0:51	26:12.5	2 (0+1+1+0)	+59.6
7	3	Arina Pantova	Kazakhstan	0:17	26:20.8	6 (1+0+3+2)	+1:07.9
8	7	Marit Øygard	Norway	0:37	26:32.0	4 (0+1+2+1)	+1:19.1
9	17	Ekaterina Ponedelko	Russia	1:27	26:32.1	3 (0+1+2+0)	+1:19.2
10	15	Yevgeniya Krassikova	Kazakhstan	1:14	26:46.3	3 (0+2+1+0)	+1:33.4
11	13	Jenni Keranen	Finland	1:07	27:03.8	2 (1+0+1+0)	+1:50.9
12	1	Juliane Frühwirt	Germany	0:00	27:09.5	6 (0+3+1+2)	+1:56.6
13	8	Gilonne Guigonnat	France	0:39	27:14.0	7 (3+2+0+2)	+2:01.1
14	29	Irene Lardschneider	Italy	2:26	27:18.7	2 (0+1+0+1)	+2:05.8
15	25	Sanna Sjödén	Sweden	2:08	27:23.2	4 (1+2+0+1)	+2:10.3
16	14	Tereza Vinklárková	Czech Republic	1:13	27:26.0	5 (2+1+1+1)	+2:13.1
17	19	Petra Suchá	Czech Republic	1:30	27:32.2	4 (1+2+1+0)	+2:19.3
18	21	Tais Vozelj	Slovenia	1:33	27:35.5	4 (2+0+1+1)	+2:22.6
19	18	Anneliis Viilukas	Estonia	1:29	27:43.9	4 (1+1+1+1)	+2:31.0
20	33	Franziska Pfnuer	Germany	2:39	27:59.8	1 (0+0+0+1)	+2:46.9
21	34	Natallia Karnitskaya	Belarus	2:39	28:40.5	3 (0+1+1+1)	+3:27.6
22	24	Milena Todorova	Bulgaria	1:41	28:44.6	6 (1+1+2+2)	+3:31.7
23	23	Darya Iyeropes	Belarus	1:41	29:01.2	5 (1+0+3+1)	+3:48.3
24	20	Moa Olsson	Sweden	1:31	29:02.2	6 (1+1+1+3)	+3:49.3
25	27	Liubov Kypiachenkova	Ukraine	2:16	29:09.7	5 (1+1+1+2)	+3:56.8
26	16	Darcie Morton	Australia	1:20	29:13.9	6 (2+3+1+0)	+4:01.0
27	10	Amanda Kautzer	United States	0:59	29:17.1	8 (3+2+1+2)	+4:04.2
28	28	Lea Wörter	Austria	2:21	29:26.3	3 (1+1+0+1)	+4:13.4
29	36	Henrieta Horvátová	Slovakia	2:43	29:29.6	2 (0+0+1+1)	+4:16.7
30	31	Joanna Jakieła	Poland	2:29	29:38.8	7 (1+1+4+1)	+4:25.9
31	12	Anastasiia Khaliullina	Russia	1:04	29:39.8	10 (4+2+2+2)	+4:26.9
32	40	Veronika Haidelmeierová	Slovakia	3:02	30:13.3	1 (0+0+0+1)	+5:00.4
33	32	Saana Lahdelma	Finland	2:33	30:24.2	5 (2+0+1+2)	+5:11.3
34	26	Maria Zdravkova	Bulgaria	2:15	30:47.7	7 (1+1+3+2)	+5:34.8
35	35	Tekarra Benser	Canada	2:42	30:56.5	5 (1+0+2+2)	+5:43.6
36	39	Enikő Márton	Romania	2:59	31:02.7	7 (1+1+4+1)	+5:49.8
37	41	Flavia Barmettler	Switzerland	3:11	31:18.0	6 (2+1+1+2)	+6:05.1
38	44	Vitalija Kutkauskaitė	Lithuania	3:40	31:27.7	1 (1+0+0+0)	+6:14.8
39	43	Mirella Veres	Hungary	3:38	31:38.2	3 (0+1+0+2)	+6:25.3
40	37	Marion Berger	Austria	2:51	31:41.4	5 (2+2+0+1)	+6:28.5
41	46	Natalia Tomaszewska	Poland	4:18	32:47.3	7 (2+2+2+1)	+7:34.4
42	11	Mariya Abe	South Korea	1:01	33:12.2	12 (5+3+4+0)	+7:59.3
43	45	Nora Viktorija Osīte	Latvia	3:49	34:11.2	6 (0+2+2+2)	+8:58.3
44	42	Anja Fischer	Switzerland	3:11	34:34.2	9 (4+1+2+2)	+9:21.3
45	30	Gillian Gowling	Canada	2:28	34:58.2	6 (1+1+2+2)	+9:45.3
46	38	Hanna Moor	Estonia	2:57	35:53.7	12 (2+4+3+3)	+10:40.8
47	47	Nadežda Derendiajeva	Lithuania	4:29	39:05.6	15 (3+4+3+5)	+13:52.7
48	48	Teodora Đukić	Bosnia and Herzegovina	6:41	42:28.9	11 (4+2+2+3)	+17:16.0
49	49	Kunduz Abdykadyrova	Kyrgyzstan	7:58	47:34.1	17 (4+5+5+3)	+22:21.2
