= Ariane Burri =

Swiss snowboarder (born 2000)

Personal information
- Born: April 14, 2000 (age 26) Bern, Switzerland

Sport
- Country: Switzerland
- Sport: Snowboarding

Ariane Burri (born 14 April 2000) is a Swiss snowboarder. She made her Olympic debut representing Switzerland at the 2022 Winter Olympics.

== Career ==
She represented Switzerland at the 2016 Winter Youth Olympics and competed in both girls' slopestyle and girls' halfpipe events.

She competed at the 2022 Winter Olympics and took part in both the women's slopestyle and women's big air events.
