= Slovakia at the 2016 Winter Youth Olympics =

- IOC code: SVK
- NOC: Slovak Olympic Committee
- Website: www.olympic.sk

in Lillehammer
- Competitors: 33 in 7 sports
- Flag bearer: Sebastian Čederle
- Medals Ranked 24th: Gold 0 Silver 1 Bronze 0 Total 1

Winter Youth Olympics appearances (overview)
- 2012; 2016; 2020; 2024

Slovakia competed at the 2016 Winter Youth Olympics in Lillehammer, Norway from 12 to 21 February 2016.

== Medalists ==
Medal	Name	Sport	Event	Date
Silver	Sebastian Čederle	Ice hockey	Boys' individual skills challenge	18 February

== Alpine skiing ==
Boys

Athlete	Event	Run 1		Run 2		Total	
Athlete	Event	Time	Rank	Time	Rank	Time	Rank
Henrich Katrenic	Slalom	51.50	16	52.30	23	1:43.80	16
Henrich Katrenic	Giant slalom	1:23.43	29	1:21.05	23	2:44.48	24
Henrich Katrenic	Super-G	—N/a				1:13.89	27
Henrich Katrenic	Combined	1:13.14	11	43.47	20	1:56.61	15

Girls

Athlete	Event	Run 1		Run 2		Total	
Athlete	Event	Time	Rank	Time	Rank	Time	Rank
Tereza Jancova	Slalom	57.74	15	53.32	14	1:51.06	14
Tereza Jancova	Giant slalom	1:22.56	16	1:18.79	15	2:41.35	15
Tereza Jancova	Super-G	—N/a				1:15.93	14
Tereza Jancova	Combined	1:17.37	17	44.81	10	2:02.18	10

== Biathlon ==
Boys

Athlete	Event	Time	Misses	Rank
Matej Lepen	Sprint	21:26.1	2 (1+1)	30
Matej Lepen	Pursuit	32:50.7	4 (0+0+3+1)	24
Miroslav Pavlak	Sprint	20:52.8	1 (0+1)	19
Miroslav Pavlak	Pursuit	33:20.4	7 (2+0+2+3)	28

Girls

Athlete	Event	Time	Misses	Rank
Veronika Haidelmeierova	Sprint	21:25.3	2 (2+0)	40
Veronika Haidelmeierova	Pursuit	30:13.3	1 (0+0+0+1)	32
Henrieta Horvatova	Sprint	21:06.7	3 (2+1)	36
Henrieta Horvatova	Pursuit	29:29.6	2 (0+0+1+1)	29

Mixed

Athletes	Event	Time	Misses	Rank
Henrieta Horvatova; Matej Lepen	Single mixed relay	45:22.1	2+13	16
Henrieta Horvatova; Veronika Haidelmeierova; Matej Lepen; Miroslav Pavlak	Mixed relay	1:25:20.6	1+8	10

== Bobsleigh ==
Athlete	Event	Run 1		Run 2		Total	
Athlete	Event	Time	Rank	Time	Rank	Time	Rank
Jakub Ciernik	Boys'	58.37	12	58.14	8	1:56.51	10

== Cross-country skiing ==
Boys

Athlete	Event	Qualification		Quarterfinal		Semifinal		Final	
Athlete	Event	Time	Rank	Time	Rank	Time	Rank	Time	Rank
Jan Mikus	10 km freestyle	—N/a						27:57.1	40
Jan Mikus	Classical sprint	3:11.27	24 Q	3:15.69	6	did not advance			
Jan Mikus	Cross-country cross	3:25.72	35	—N/a		did not advance			

Girls

Athlete	Event	Qualification		Quarterfinal		Semifinal		Final	
Athlete	Event	Time	Rank	Time	Rank	Time	Rank	Time	Rank
Zuzana Sefcikova	5 km freestyle	—N/a						16:02.3	38
Zuzana Sefcikova	Classical sprint	3:50.74	31	did not advance					
Zuzana Sefcikova	Cross-country cross	4:07.26	33	—N/a		did not advance			

== Figure skating ==
Singles

Athlete	Event	SP		FS		Total	
Athlete	Event	Points	Rank	Points	Rank	Points	Rank
Alexandra Hagarova	Girls' singles	38.75	16	74.52	12	113.27	16

Mixed NOC team trophy

Athletes	Event	Free skate/Free dance					
Athletes	Event	Ice dance	Pairs	Girls	Boys	Total	
Athletes	Event	Points Team points	Points Team points	Points Team points	Points Team points	Points	Rank
Team Courage; Anastasia Shpilevaya / Grigory Smirnov (RUS); Irma Caldara / Edoardo Caputo (ITA); Alexandra Hagarova (SVK); Cha Jun-hwan (KOR)	Team trophy	86.48; 8	68.81; 1	75.55; 2	139.97; 6	17	6

== Ice hockey ==
Athlete	Event	Qualification		Final	
Athlete	Event	Points	Rank	Points	Rank
Sebastian Cederle	Boys' individual skills challenge	19	1 Q	12	2nd place, silver medalist(s)
Martina Fedorova	Girls' individual skills challenge	12	7 Q	7	7

=== Girls' tournament ===
Roster

- Patricia Agostonova
- Paula Caganova
- Alexandra Cornakova
- Michaela Hajnikova
- Kinga Horvathova
- Klaudia Kleinova
- Barbora Koysova
- Livia Kubekova
- Nina Kucerkova
- Simona Lezovicova
- Zuzana Majerikova
- Sylvia Matasova
- Andrea Risianova
- Nikola Rumanova
- Dominika Sedlakova
- Laura Sulikova
- Diana Vargova

Group Stage

Pos	Team	Pld	W	OTW	OTL	L	GF	GA	GD	Pts	Qualification
1	Sweden	4	2	1	1	0	10	3	+7	9	Advance to semifinals
2	Czech Republic	4	3	0	0	1	7	4	+3	9	Advance to semifinals
3	Switzerland	4	2	1	0	1	10	6	+4	8	Advance to semifinals
4	Slovakia	4	1	0	1	2	6	9	−3	4	Advance to semifinals
5	Norway	4	0	0	0	4	2	13	−11	0	

Updated to match(es) played on 19 February 2016. Source: IIHF.com

12 February 2016; 14:00	Slovakia	2–1 (0–1, 1–0, 1–0)	Norway	Kristins Hall; Attendance: 425

Game reference

Simona Lezovicova
Andrea Risianova
Goalies
Ena Marie Nystrøm
Mia Christine Isdahl
Referee:
(Canada) Vanessa Ley
Linesmen:
(Netherlands) Senovwa Mollen
(Germany) Jacqueline Sauer

	0–1	Sirum (Endrerud, Jørgensen – 12:45
Agostonova – 38:04	1–1
Matasova (Čorňáková, Koyšová) – 15:51	2–1

1.5 min
Penalties
29.5 min
19
Shots
8

13 February 2016; 17:00	Czech Republic	2–1 (1–1, 1–0, 0–0)	Slovakia	Kristins Hall

15 February 2016; 17:00	Sweden	2–1 (1–0, 0–1, 0–0, 1–0)	Slovakia	Youth Hall

16 February 2016; 17:00	Slovakia	2–4 (0–0, 1–3, 1–1)	Switzerland	Kristins Hall

Semifinals

19 February 2016; 14:00	Sweden	5–0 (4–0, 0–0, 1–0)	Slovakia	Kristins Hall

Bronze medal game

20 February 2016; 17:00	Switzerland	5–2 (0–1, 3–0, 2–1)	Slovakia	Kristins Hall

== Luge ==
Individual sleds

Athlete	Event	Run 1		Run 2		Total	
Athlete	Event	Time	Rank	Time	Rank	Time	Rank
Richard Gavlas	Boys	48.895	12	48.949	14	1:37.844	14
Katarina Simonakova	Girls	54.127	14	54.072	15	1:48.199	14
Tomas Vavercak; Matej Zmij	Doubles	53.405	6	53.663	6	1:47.068	6

Mixed team relay

Athlete	Event	Girls		Boys		Doubles		Total	
Athlete	Event	Time	Rank	Time	Rank	Time	Rank	Time	Rank
Katarina Simonakova; Richard Gavlas; Tomas Vavercak; Matej Zmij	Team relay	58.232	10	58.977	8	59.944	7	2:57.153	8

== See also ==
- Slovakia at the 2016 Summer Olympics
