= Australia at the 2016 Winter Youth Olympics =

- IOC code: AUS
- NOC: Australian Olympic Committee
- Website: www.olympics.com.au

in Lillehammer
- Competitors: 17 in 8 sports
- Flag bearer: Emily Arthur
- Medals Ranked 19th: Gold 0 Silver 3 Bronze 1 Total 4

Winter Youth Olympics appearances
- 2012; 2016; 2020; 2024

Australia competed at the 2016 Winter Youth Olympics in Lillehammer, Norway from 12 to 21 February 2016.

== Medalists ==
Medal	Name	Sport	Event	Date
Silver	Emily Arthur	Snowboarding	Girls' halfpipe	14 February
Silver	Alex Dickson	Snowboarding	Boys' snowboard cross	15 February
Silver	Zali Offord	Freestyle skiing	Girls' ski cross	15 February
Bronze	Louis Muhlen	Freestyle skiing	Boys' ski cross	15 February

=== Medalists in mixed NOCs events ===
Medal	Name	Sport	Event	Date
Silver	Julia Moore	Short track	Mixed team relay	20 February

== Alpine skiing ==
Boys

Athlete	Event	Run 1		Run 2		Total	
Athlete	Event	Time	Rank	Time	Rank	Time	Rank
Louis Muhlen	Slalom	DNF		did not advance			
Louis Muhlen	Giant slalom	DNF		did not advance			
Louis Muhlen	Super-G	—N/a				1:14.35	29
Louis Muhlen	Combined	1:13.80	23	43.23	19	1:57.03	17

Girls

Athlete	Event	Run 1		Run 2		Total	
Athlete	Event	Time	Rank	Time	Rank	Time	Rank
Kathryn Parker	Slalom	DNF		did not advance			
Kathryn Parker	Giant slalom	DNF		did not advance			
Kathryn Parker	Super-G	—N/a				1:16.41	16
Kathryn Parker	Combined	1:17.32	16	46.98	19	2:04.30	17

== Biathlon ==
Boys

Athlete	Event	Time	Misses	Rank
Jethro Mahon	Sprint	27:20.8	5	50
Jethro Mahon	Pursuit	46:24.0	6	50

Girls

Athlete	Event	Time	Misses	Rank
Darcie Morton	Sprint	19:43.3	1	16
Darcie Morton	Pursuit	29:13.9	6	26

Mixed

Athletes	Event	Time	Misses	Rank
Darcie Morton; Jethro Mahon	Single mixed relay	48:56.9	0+15	27

== Cross-country skiing ==
Boys

Athlete	Event	Qualification		Quarterfinal		Semifinal		Final	
Athlete	Event	Time	Rank	Time	Rank	Time	Rank	Time	Rank
Liam Burton	10 km freestyle	—N/a						26:13.8	27
Liam Burton	Classical sprint	3:30.25	41	did not advance					
Liam Burton	Cross-country cross	3:34.35	38	—N/a		did not advance			

Girls

Athlete	Event	Qualification		Quarterfinal		Semifinal		Final	
Athlete	Event	Time	Rank	Time	Rank	Time	Rank	Time	Rank
Lillian Boland	5 km freestyle	—N/a						15:10.6	28
Lillian Boland	Classical sprint	4:04.21	36	did not advance					
Lillian Boland	Cross-country cross	3:52.64	23 Q	—N/a		3:50.78	10	did not advance	

== Freestyle skiing ==
Halfpipe

Athlete	Event	Final				
Athlete	Event	Run 1	Run 2	Run 3	Best	Rank
Cameroon Waddell	Boys' halfpipe	45.80	27.60	18.20	45.80	9

Ski cross

Athlete	Event	Qualification		Group heats		Semifinal	Final
Athlete	Event	Time	Rank	Points	Rank	Position	Position
Douglas Crawford	Boys' ski cross	44.51	8 Q	17	4 Q	4 FB	6
Louis Muhlen	Boys' ski cross	44.10	4 Q	15	5 Q	2 FA	3rd place, bronze medalist(s)
Zali Offord	Girls' ski cross	46.26	4	17	4 Q	1 FA	2nd place, silver medalist(s)

Slopestyle

Athlete	Event	Final			
Athlete	Event	Run 1	Run 2	Best	Rank
Cameroon Waddell	Boys' slopestyle	54.30	55.80	55.80	13

== Ice hockey ==
Athlete	Event	Qualification		Final	
Athlete	Event	Points	Rank	Points	Rank
Jake Riley	Boys' individual skills challenge	9	9	did not advance	
Madison Poole	Girls' individual skills challenge	16	3 Q	12	5

== Luge ==
Athlete	Event	Run 1		Run 2		Total	
Athlete	Event	Time	Rank	Time	Rank	Time	Rank
Beth Slade	Girls	56.488	19	57.008	19	1:53.496	20

== Short track speed skating ==
Girls

Athlete	Event	Quarterfinal		Semifinal		Final	
Athlete	Event	Time	Rank	Time	Rank	Time	Rank
Julia Moore	500 m	48.897	4 SC/D	48.196	3 FD	50.606	12
Julia Moore	1000 m	1:45.694	4 FC	—N/a		1:40.993	12

Mixed team relay

Athlete	Event	Semifinal		Final	
Athlete	Event	Time	Rank	Time	Rank
Team C Petra Jaszapati (HUN); Julia Moore (AUS); Tjerk De Boer (NED); Kiichi Shigehiro (JPN)	Mixed team relay	4:15.332	1 FA	4:14.495	2nd place, silver medalist(s)

Qualification Legend: FA=Final A (medal); FB=Final B (non-medal); FC=Final C (non-medal); FD=Final D (non-medal); SA/B=Semifinals A/B; SC/D=Semifinals C/D; ADV=Advanced to Next Round; PEN=Penalized

== Snowboarding ==
Halfpipe

Athlete	Event	Final				
Athlete	Event	Run 1	Run 2	Run 3	Best	Rank
Emily Arthur	Girls' halfpipe	87.25	90.00	63.00	90.00	2nd place, silver medalist(s)
Mahalah Mullins	Girls' halfpipe	26.50	27.25	23.00	27.25	15

Snowboard cross

Athlete	Event	Qualification		Group heats		Semifinal	Final
Athlete	Event	Time	Rank	Points	Rank	Position	Position
Alex Dickson	Boys' snowboard cross	47.93	3 Q	17	4 Q	2 FA	2nd place, silver medalist(s)
Mollie Fernandez	Girls' snowboard cross	52.89	8 Q	14	6 Q	2 FA	4

Slopestyle

Athlete	Event	Final			
Athlete	Event	Run 1	Run 2	Best	Rank
Emily Arthur	Girls' slopestyle	44.50	20.25	44.50	14
Mahalah Mullins	Girls' slopestyle	25.75	76.75	76.75	5

Snowboard and ski cross relay

Athlete	Event	Quarterfinal	Semifinal	Final
Athlete	Event	Position	Position	Position
Mollie Fernandez; Zali Offord; Alex Dickson; Douglas Crawford	Team snowboard ski cross	2 Q	4 FB	6

Qualification legend: FA – Qualify to medal round; FB – Qualify to consolation round

== See also ==
- Australia at the 2016 Summer Olympics
