= Freestyle skiing at the 2016 Winter Youth Olympics – Boys' ski cross =

Boys' ski cross at the II Winter Youth Olympic Games
- Venue: Hafjell Freepark
- Dates: 15 February
- Competitors: 18 from 17 nations

Medalists
| 1st place, gold medalist(s) | | Reece Howden | Canada |
| 2nd place, silver medalist(s) | | Xander Vercammen | Belgium |
| 3rd place, bronze medalist(s) | | Louis Muhlen | Australia |

The boys' ski cross event at the 2016 Winter Youth Olympics took place on 15 February at the Hafjell Freepark.

== Results ==
=== Qualification ===
The qualification was held at 13:35.

| Rank | Bib | Name | Country | Time | Difference | Notes |
|---|---|---|---|---|---|---|
| 1 | 12 | David Mobärg | Sweden | 42.86 | | Q |
| 2 | 5 | Cornel Renn | Germany | 42.91 | +0.05 | Q |
| 3 | 1 | Reece Howden | Canada | 43.35 | +0.49 | Q |
| 4 | 13 | Louis Muhlen | Australia | 44.10 | +1.24 | Q |
| 5 | 17 | Xander Vercammen | Belgium | 44.14 | +1.28 | Q |
| 6 | 2 | Marcel Illmaier | Austria | 44.26 | +1.40 | Q |
| 7 | 3 | Sascha Rüedi | Switzerland | 44.32 | +1.46 | Q |
| 8 | 11 | Douglas Crawford | Australia | 44.51 | +1.65 | Q |
| 9 | 16 | Russell Malm | United States | 44.62 | +1.76 | Q |
| 10 | 6 | Matteo Lucatelli | France | 44.65 | +1.79 | Q |
| 11 | 14 | Tobias Knollseisen | Italy | 44.69 | +1.83 | Q |
| 12 | 15 | Roberto Negrín | Chile | 44.74 | +1.88 | Q |
| 13 | 4 | Kirill Bagin | Russia | 45.22 | +2.36 | Q |
| 14 | 8 | Mathis Bosshard Haavi | Norway | 45.99 | +3.13 | Q |
| 15 | 10 | Bence Nagy | Hungary | 46.77 | +3.91 | Q |
| 16 | 18 | Fernando Soto Herrera | Mexico | 47.28 | +4.42 | Q |
| 17 | 7 | Luka Štros | Slovenia | 47.38 | +4.52 | |
| 18 | 9 | Olzhas Kairat | Kazakhstan | 49.11 | +6.25 | |

=== Group heats ===
| Rank | Bib | Athlete | Country | Group 1 | | | | Group 2 | | | | Group 3 | | | | Group 4 | | | | Group 5 | | | | Total |
| Rank | Bib | Athlete | Country | 1 | 2 | 3 | 4 | 5 | 6 | 7 | 8 | 9 | 10 | 11 | 12 | 13 | 14 | 15 | 16 | 17 | 18 | 19 | 20 | Total |
|---|---|---|---|---|---|---|---|---|---|---|---|---|---|---|---|---|---|---|---|---|---|---|---|---|
| 1 | 3 | Reece Howden | Canada | 4 | | | | | | 4 | | | | 4 | | | | 4 | | | | 4 | | 20 |
| 2 | 1 | David Mobärg | Sweden | 3 | | | | 4 | | | | 4 | | | | 4 | | | | 4 | | | | 19 |
| 3 | 2 | Cornel Renn | Germany | 2 | | | | | 4 | | | | 4 | | | | 4 | | | | 4 | | | 18 |
| 4 | 8 | Douglas Crawford | Australia | | 4 | | | | | | 4 | | | 3 | | | 3 | | | 3 | | | | 17 |
| 5 | 4 | Louis Muhlen | Australia | 1 | | | | | | | 3 | | | | 4 | | | | 4 | | | | 3 | 15 |
| 6 | 5 | Xander Vercammen | Belgium | | 1 | | | 3 | | | | | 3 | | | | | 3 | | | | | 4 | 14 |
| 7 | 10 | Matteo Lucatelli | France | | | 4 | | | 3 | | | | | | 3 | | | 2 | | 2 | | | | 14 |
| 8 | 6 | Marcel Illmaier | Austria | | 3 | | | | 2 | | | 3 | | | | | | | 3 | | | 2 | | 13 |
| 9 | 7 | Sascha Rüedi | Switzerland | | 2 | | | | | 3 | | | | | 2 | 3 | | | | | 3 | | | 13 |
| 10 | 14 | Mathis Bosshard Haavi | Norway | | | | 4 | | 1 | | | | | 2 | | 2 | | | | | | | 2 | 11 |
| 11 | 13 | Kirill Bagin | Russia | | | | 1 | 2 | | | | | | | 1 | | 2 | | | | | 3 | | 9 |
| 12 | 11 | Tobias Knollseisen | Italy | | | 2 | | | | 2 | | 2 | | | | | 1 | | | | | | 1 | 8 |
| 13 | 16 | Fernando Soto Herrera | Mexico | | | | 3 | | | | 1 | 1 | | | | | | 1 | | | 2 | | | 8 |
| 14 | 9 | Russell Malm | United States | | | 3 | | DNF | | | | | | 1 | | | | | 2 | | 1 | | | 7 |
| 15 | 12 | Roberto Negrín | Chile | | | 1 | | | | | 2 | | 2 | | | 1 | | | | | | 1 | | 7 |
| 16 | 15 | Bence Nagy | Hungary | | | | 2 | | | 1 | | | 1 | | | | | | 1 | 1 | | | | 6 |

=== Semifinals ===
Heat 1

| Rank | Bib | Name | Country | Notes |
|---|---|---|---|---|
| 1 | 3 | Reece Howden | Canada | BF |
| 2 | 4 | Louis Muhlen | Australia | BF |
| 3 | 6 | Marcel Illmaier | Austria | SF |
| 4 | 8 | Douglas Crawford | Australia | SF |

Heat 2

| Rank | Bib | Name | Country | Notes |
|---|---|---|---|---|
| 1 | 5 | Xander Vercammen | Belgium | BF |
| 2 | 10 | Matteo Lucatelli | France | BF |
| 3 | 2 | Cornel Renn | Germany | SF |
| 4 | 1 | David Mobärg | Sweden | SF |

=== Finals ===
The final was held at 15:40.

Small final

| Rank | Bib | Name | Country | Notes |
|---|---|---|---|---|
| 5 | 1 | David Mobärg | Sweden | |
| 6 | 8 | Douglas Crawford | Australia | |
| 7 | 2 | Cornel Renn | Germany | |
| 8 | 6 | Marcel Illmaier | Austria | |

Big final

| Rank | Bib | Name | Country | Notes |
|---|---|---|---|---|
| 1st place, gold medalist(s) | 3 | Reece Howden | Canada | |
| 2nd place, silver medalist(s) | 5 | Xander Vercammen | Belgium | |
| 3rd place, bronze medalist(s) | 4 | Louis Muhlen | Australia | |
| 4 | 10 | Matteo Lucatelli | France | |
