= Aleksander Melås =

Norwegian luger (born 1998)

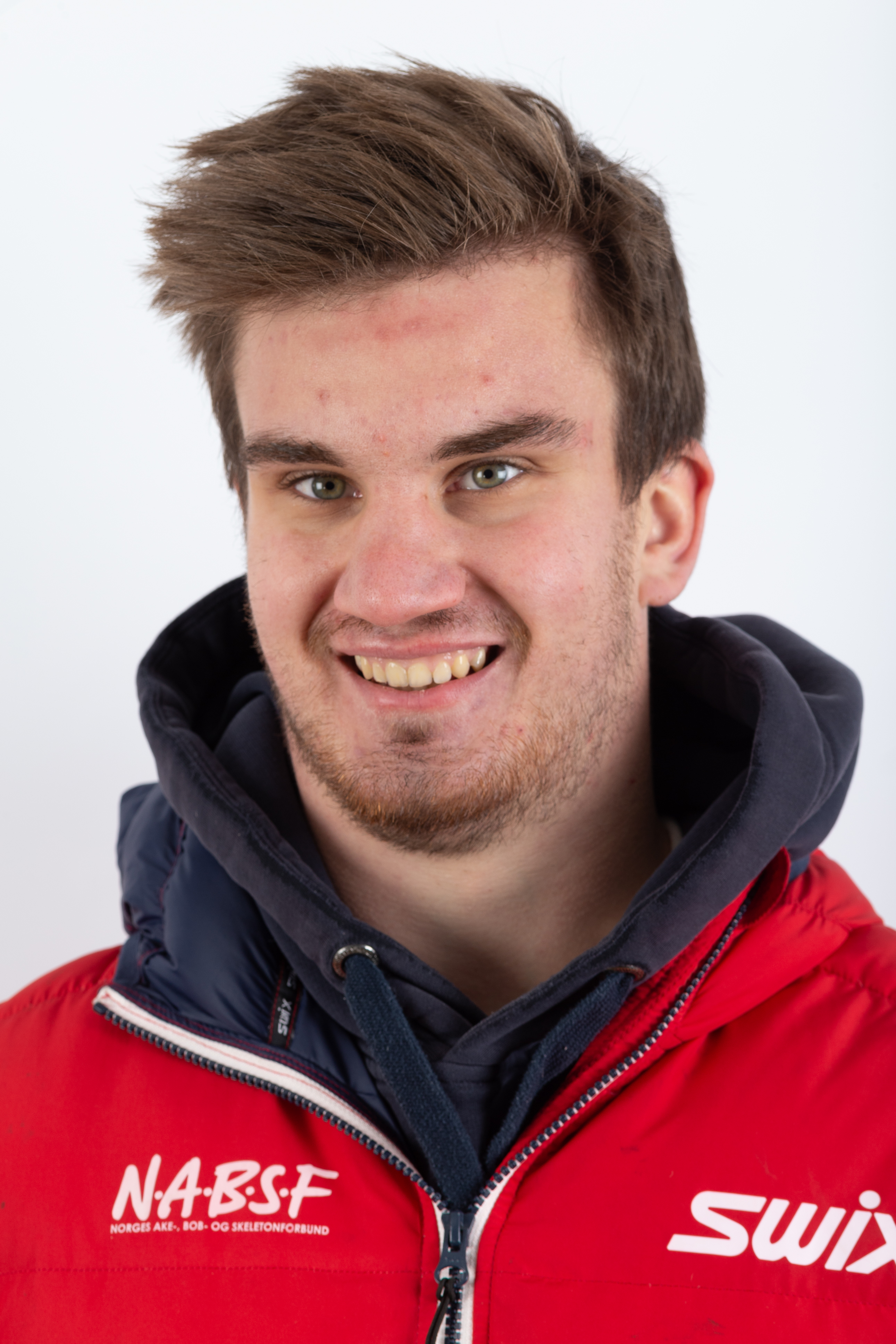

Aleksander Melås (born 14 March 1998) is a retired Norwegian luger.

Melås hails from Øyer Municipality. He was the flagbearer for Norway at the 2016 Winter Youth Olympics, where he finished eighth. He competed at the 2017 World Luge Championships and in the singles and sprint events at the 2017 World Luge Championships.

He announced his retirement in 2019.
