= Ice hockey at the 2016 Winter Youth Olympics – Boys' individual skills challenge =

Boys' individual skills challenge at the II Winter Youth Olympic Games
- Venue: Kristins Hall
- Date: February 13–15 (qualification); February 18
- Competitors: 16 from 16 nations
- Winning points: 14

Medalists
1st place, gold medalist(s)		Eduard Cășăneanu	Romania
2nd place, silver medalist(s)		Sebastián Čederle	Slovakia
3rd place, bronze medalist(s)		Aleks Haatanen	Finland
3rd place, bronze medalist(s)		Erik Betzold	Germany

The boys' individual skills challenge at the 2016 Winter Youth Olympics was held between February 13–18, 2016 at Kristins Hall in Lillehammer, Norway.

== Entry List/Seedings ==
Legend
S1	Fastest lap
S2	Shooting accuracy
S3	Skating agility
S4	Fastest shot
S5	Passing precision
S6	Puck control

Overall Seeding	Name	Country	Jersey Number	Skill Seedings					
Overall Seeding	Name	Country	Jersey Number	S1	S2	S3	S4	S5	S6
1	Erik Betzold	Germany	2	1	11	1	4	2	12
2	Sebastián Čederle	Slovakia	16	2	5	10	1	7	1
3	Sander Dilling Hurrød	Norway	17	8	14	7	5	1	2
4	Benjamin Baumgartner	Austria	24	11	1	6	6	4	6
5	Antonin Plagnat	France	11	12	8	2	9	3	11
6	Aleks Haatanen	Finland	26	7	7	4	10	8	3
7	Nátán Vértes	Hungary	10	4	6	9	8	15	8
8	Carson Focht	Canada	20	15	12	8	2	11	7
9	Andrei Pavlenka	Belarus	15	3	15	5	12	16	4
10	Jake Riley	Australia	16	5	16	3	14	12	5
11	Dino Mukovoz	Lithuania	5	14	2	13	13	13	9
12	Ties van Soest	Netherlands	4	16	3	12	16	9	10
13	Hsieh Mu-hsin	Chinese Taipei	15	10	9	16	7	5	14
14	Roy Kanda	Japan	17	13	4	11	11	10	15
15	Eduard Cășăneanu	Romania	24	9	13	15	3	14	13
16	Ollie Curtis	New Zealand	13	6	10	14	15	6	16

== Qualification ==
Participants received 1 point for completing the 1st round, 2 points for completing the quarter-final, 3 points for completing the semi-final, 4 points for completing the final, and 5 points for winning the final. They are then ranked in most events according to best time; in Shooting Accuracy and Passing Precision they are ranked by most targets hit (T) in fewest attempts (A) then in the best time; and in Fastest Shot by highest speed.

The players are ranked (Rk) by total points (Pt). If still tied, by number of better skill rankings (number of ranks 1; if the same, number of ranks 2; if the same, number of ranks 3, etc.). If still tied, by overall seeding for the phase.

The eight highest ranked will qualify (Q) to the Grand Final with the ninth and tenth ranked on reserve (R) for the Grand Final.

Rk	Name	Fastest Lap			Shooting Accuracy			Skating Agility			Fastest Shot			Passing Precision			Puck Control			Total Pts	
Rk	Name	Pt	Rk	Best time	Pt	Rk	Best T/A/time	Pt	Rk	Best time	Pt	Rk	Highest speed	Pt	Rk	Best T/A/time	Pt	Rk	Best time	Total Pts	
1	Sebastián Čederle (SVK)	5	1	17.09	2	8	3/13/30.00	3	3	13.12	4	2	140.1	0	16	DNF	5	1	15.16	19	Q
2	Eduard Cășăneanu (ROU)	3	3	17.28	4	2	4/9/20.00	2	8	13.60	5	1	143.1	2	8	5/12/17.78	2	7	16.40	18	Q
3	Erik Betzold (GER)	3	4	17.78	1	13	2/13/30.00	5	1	12.88	3	4	142.9	4	2	5/6/12.00	2	6	16.00	18	Q
4	Nátán Vértes (HUN)	2	6	17.72	5	1	4/8/19.84	3	4	13.20	1	11	133.1	1	11	5/14/24.37	4	2	14.72	16	Q
5	Aleks Haatanen (FIN)	4	2	17.06	2	5	4/10/21.03	2	5	13.16	1	13	126.9	3	4	5/9/15.69	2	5	15.80	14	Q
6	Sander Dilling Hurrød (NOR)	1	11	18.00	2	6	4/11/25.66	1	10	13.48	2	6	137.3	5	1	5/6/9.81	2	8	16.76	13	Q
7	Benjamin Baumgartner (AUT)	1	12	18.03	1	9	4/10/23.53	4	2	12.92	1	9	136.8	1	9	5/7/12.88	3	3	14.92	11	Q
8	Dino Mukovoz (LTU)	2	7	17.97	2	7	3/13/30.00	1	12	13.98	1	12	131.3	3	3	5/7/12.60	1	11	19.18	10	Q
9	Jake Riley (AUS)	1	9	17.56	3	3	4/7/18.03	1	11	13.52	1	15	119.2	2	6	5/8/15.59	1	14	20.24	9	R
10	Carson Focht (CAN)	1	13	18.66	1	15	1/11/30.00	1	16	15.20	3	3	145.3	2	7	5/11/23.19	1	9	16.56	9	R
11	Antonin Plagnat (FRA)	1	8	16.75; PEN	3	4	4/8/15.88	1	13	14.26	2	7	135.9	1	12	4/13/30.00	1	13	20.16	9	
12	Ties van Soest (NED)	1	14	18.81	1	10	3/13/30.00	1	14	14.74	1	14	122.4	1	10	5/9/19.25	3	4	16.36	8	
13	Roy Kanda (JPN)	1	10	17.75	1	11	3/13/30.00	1	9	13.20	2	5	143.1	2	5	5/8/15.19	1	12	19.44	8	
14	Ollie Curtis (NZL)	2	5	17.59	1	14	1/11/30.00	2	7	13.48	1	16	118.7	1	13	4/15/30.00	1	10	18.24	8	
15	Hsieh Mu-hsin (TPE)	1	15	19.81	1	12	3/14/30.00	1	15	15.12	2	8	128.4	1	15	3/13/30.00	1	16	24.16	7	
16	Andrei Pavlenka (BLR)	0	16	DNS	0	16	DNS	2	6	13.39	1	10	136.5	1	14	4/17/30.00	1	15	23.48	5	

== Grand final ==
Rk	Name	Fastest Lap			Shooting Accuracy			Skating Agility			Fastest Shot			Passing Precision			Puck Control			Total Pts
Rk	Name	Pt	Rk	Best time	Pt	Rk	Best T/A/time	Pt	Rk	Best time	Pt	Rk	Highest speed	Pt	Rk	Best T/A/time	Pt	Rk	Best time	Total Pts
1st place, gold medalist(s)	Eduard Cășăneanu (ROU)	3	2	17.20	2	3	4/8/17.50	1	7	14.96	4	1	145.5	1	7	5/16/26.09	3	2	15.80	14
2nd place, silver medalist(s)	Sebastián Čederle (SVK)	1	8	17.88	1	7	3/14/30.00	2	4	13.76	3	2	139.2	1	6	5/11/28.87	4	1	15.08	12
(bronze)	Aleks Haatanen (FIN)	2	3	16.48	3	2	4/12/29.85	1	8	19.84	1	8	125.0	3	2	5/8/15.00; DNF	2	3	15.64	12
3rd place, bronze medalist(s)	Erik Betzold (GER)	1	6	17.48	1	8	1/12/30.00	3	2	12.84	1	5	139.4	4	1	5/7/13.59	1	8	23.76	11
5	Nátán Vértes (HUN)	4	1	17.16	2	4	4/12/30.00	2	3	13.00	2	3	142.5	0	8	DNF	1	5	19.16	11
6	Dino Mukovoz (LTU)	1	7	17.56	4	1	4/6/12.25	1	5	13.24	1	7	131.7	2	3	5/7/12.56	1	6	19.78	10
7	Benjamin Baumgartner (AUT)	2	4	17.04	1	6	3/12/30.00	4	1	12.48	1	6	135.1	1	5	5/10/19.75	1	7	20.10	10
8	Sander Dilling Hurrød (NOR)	1	5	17.32	1	5	4/13/29.35	1	6	13.80	2	4	135.4	2	4	5/7/15.28	2	4	16.44	9
