= Liubov Kypiachenkova =

Ukrainian biathlete (born 1999)

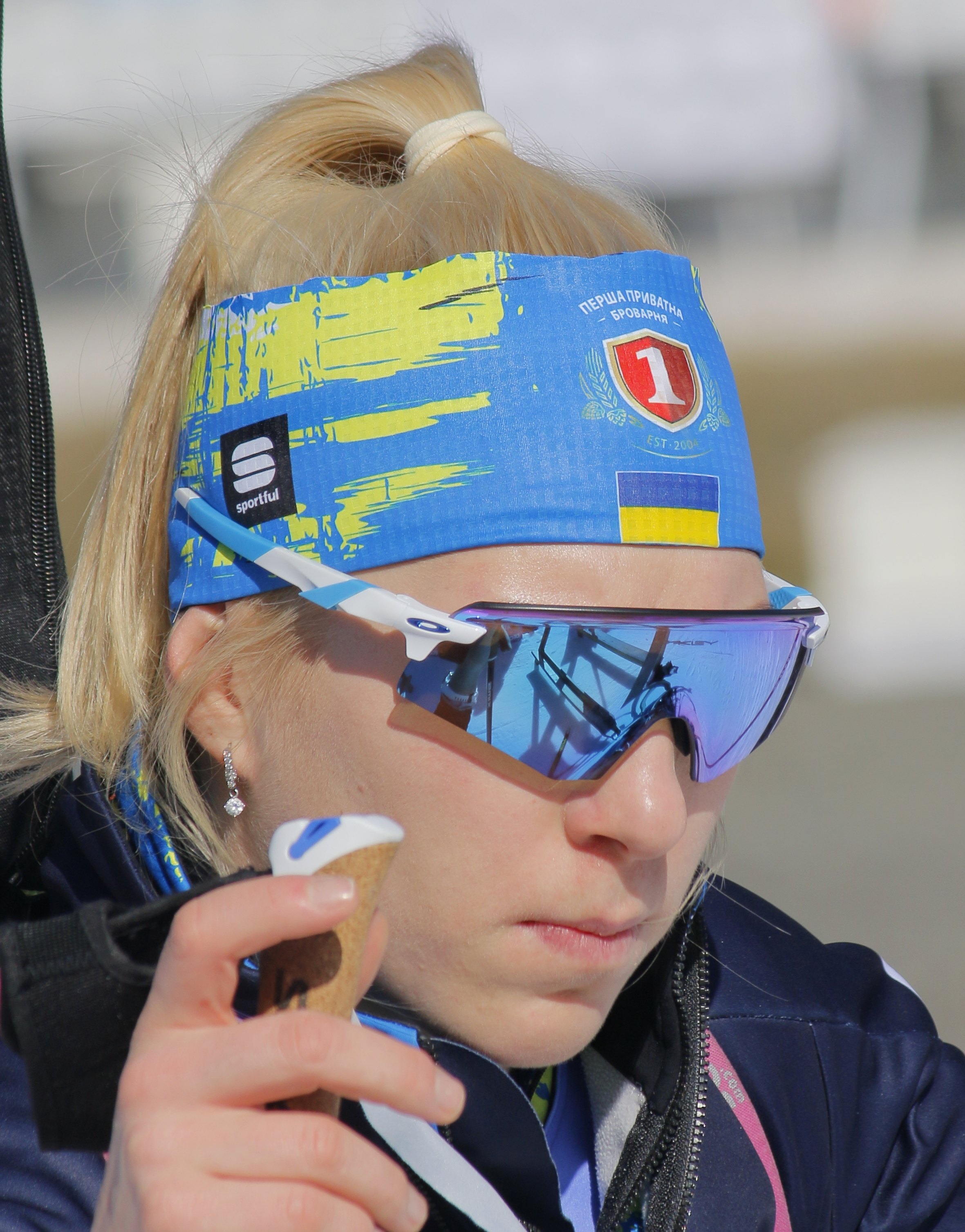
- Kypiachenkova in 2023

Personal information
- Nationality: Ukrainian
- Born: 3 May 1999 (age 26) Parkhomivka, Kharkiv Oblast, Ukraine

Sport
- Country: Ukraine
- Sport: Biathlon

Liubov Kypiachenkova (Ukrainian: Любов Кип'яченкова, born 3 May 1999) is a Ukrainian biathlete. She has competed in the Biathlon World Cup since 2023.

== Biathlon results ==
All results are sourced from the International Biathlon Union.

=== Youth and Junior World Championships ===
No medals

Year	Age	Individual	Sprint	Pursuit	Relay	Mixed relay
(Slovakia) 2017 Brezno-Osrblie	17	30th	26th	27th	5th	—N/a
(Estonia) 2018 Otepaeae	18	35th	50th	31st	13th	—N/a
(Switzerland) 2020 Lenzerheide	20	60th	49th	49th	DSQ	—N/a
(Austria) 2021 Obertilliach	21	—N/a	68th	—N/a	—N/a	—N/a

=== World Championships ===
No medals

Year	Age	Individual	Sprint	Pursuit	Relay	Mixed relay
(Germany) 2023 Oberhof	23	82nd	—N/a	—N/a	14th	—N/a
