= Kaja Verdnik =

Slovenian snowboarder (born 1999)

Personal information
- Nationality: Slovenian
- Born: 23 February 1999 (age 26)
- Height: 1.64 m (5 ft 5 in)

Sport
- Sport: Snowboarding

Kaja Verdnik (born 23 February 1999) is a Slovenian snowboarder. She competed in the 2018 Winter Olympics, in the Women's Halfpipe.
