= Linas Banys =

Lithuanian biathlete (1998–2026)

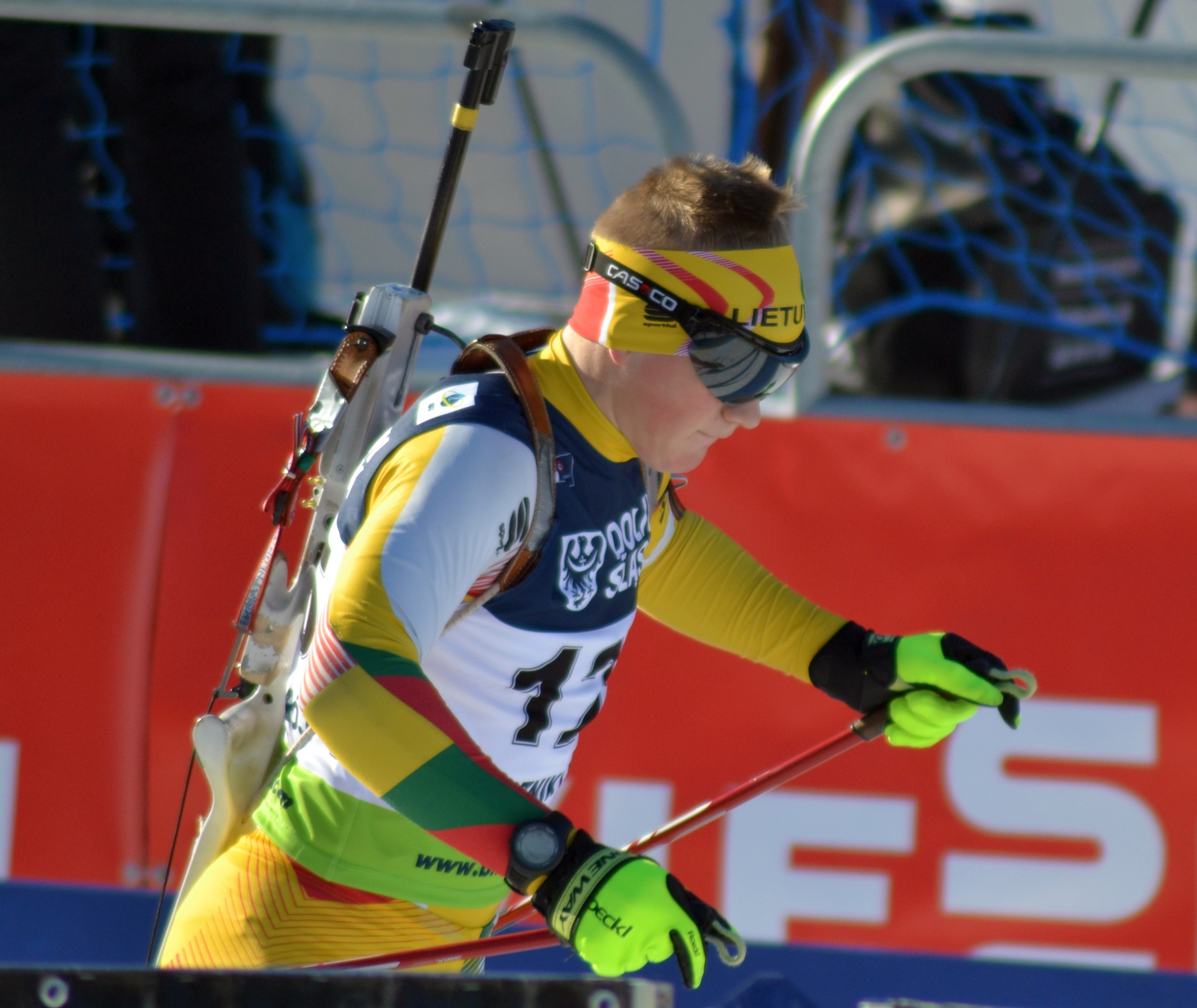
- Banys in 2017

Personal information
- Full name: Linas Banys
- Born: 6 April 1998 Anykščiai, Lithuania
- Died: 20 March 2026 (aged 27)

Sport

Professional information
- Sport: Biathlon
- Club: SK Vėtrungė
Medal record
Men's biathlon
Representing Lithuania

Linas Banys (6 April 1998 – 20 March 2026) was a Lithuanian biathlete who competed at the Biathlon World Cup.

Banys was shortlisted to represent Lithuania at the 2022 Winter Olympics.

On 20 March 2026, it was announced that Banys had died at the age of 27.

== Biathlon results ==
All results are sourced from the International Biathlon Union.

=== Olympic Games ===
0 medals

Event	Individual	Sprint	Pursuit	Mass start	Relay	Mixed relay
(China) 2022 Beijing	79th	90th	—	—	14th	—

=== World Championships ===
0 medals

Event	Individual	Sprint	Pursuit	Mass start	Relay	Mixed relay	Single Mixed relay
(Sweden) 2019 Östersund	—N/a	—N/a	—N/a	—N/a	21st	—N/a	—N/a
(Italy) 2020 Antholz-Anterselva	—N/a	—N/a	—N/a	—N/a	24th	—N/a	—N/a
(Slovenia) 2021 Pokljuka	—N/a	—N/a	—N/a	—N/a	25th	—N/a	—N/a

*During Olympic seasons competitions are only held for those events not included in the Olympic program.
**The single mixed relay was added as an event in 2019.
