= Niklas Nordgren (ice hockey, born 2000) =

Finnish ice hockey player

- Born: 4 May 2000 (age 26) Helsinki, Finland
- Height: 5 ft 9 in (175 cm)
- Weight: 169 lb (77 kg; 12 st 1 lb)
- Position: Right wing
- Shoots: Right
- Mestis team Former teams: Kiekko-Vantaa; HIFK; Lahti Pelicans
- NHL draft: 74th overall, 2018; Chicago Blackhawks
- Playing career: 2017–present

Niklas Nordgren (born 4 May 2000) is a Finnish professional ice hockey Forward who currently plays as a right wing for Kiekko-Vantaa of the Finnish Mestis.

== Playing career ==
He represented Finland in the 2018 IIHF World U18 Championships where he won the gold medal, scoring the game-winning goal in the gold medal game on a shorthanded breakaway with Jesperi Kotkaniemi's assistance.

Nordgren was projected as a top eligible draft pick for the 2018 NHL entry draft, and was drafted by the Chicago Blackhawks in the third round, 74th overall.

Having left HIFK on an initial loan move during the 2020–21 season to Lahti Pelicans, Nordgren's tenure with the Pelicans was made permanent in the off-season after signing a two-year contract extension on 20 May 2021.

== Career statistics ==
=== Regular season and playoffs ===
			Regular season					Playoffs
Season	Team	League	GP	G	A	Pts	PIM	GP	G	A	Pts	PIM
2016–17	HIFK	Jr. A	40	13	26	39	32	7	7	2	9	4
2017–18	HIFK	Jr. A	28	13	29	42	18	10	6	4	10	4
2017–18	HIFK	Liiga	15	0	3	3	4	—	—	—	—	—
2018–19	HIFK	Jr. A	13	6	13	19	10	—	—	—	—	—
2018–19	HIFK	Liiga	15	4	3	7	2	—	—	—	—	—
2019–20	HIFK	Jr. A	16	3	15	18	10	—	—	—	—	—
2019–20	HIFK	Liiga	11	0	1	1	0	—	—	—	—	—
2020–21	HIFK	Liiga	3	0	0	0	0	—	—	—	—	—
2020–21	Lahti Pelicans	Liiga	3	0	3	3	4	—	—	—	—	—
2021–22	Lahti Pelicans	Liiga	19	2	1	3	10	—	—	—	—	—
2021–22	Peliitat	Mestis	26	3	19	22	4	—	—	—	—	—
2022–23	Lahti Pelicans	Liiga	14	0	3	3	4	—	—	—	—	—
2022–23	Peliitat	Mestis	1	0	0	0	2	—	—	—	—	—
2023–24	Kiekko-Vantaa	Mestis	47	21	28	49	24	2	0	3	3	0
Liiga totals			80	6	14	20	24	—	—	—	—	—

Medal record

Representing Finland

Ice hockey

World U18 Championships
Gold medal – first place	2018 Russia	

=== International ===
Year	Team	Event	Result	GP	G	A	Pts	PIM
2016	Finland	U17	7th	5	2	1	3	2
2018	Finland	U18	1st place, gold medalist(s)	7	8	2	10	4
Junior totals				12	10	3	13	6
