= Toni Utunen =

Finnish ice hockey player (born 2000)

- Born: 27 April 2000 (age 26) Kokkola, Finland
- Height: 5 ft 11 in (180 cm)
- Weight: 176 lb (80 kg; 12 st 8 lb)
- Position: Defence
- Shoots: Left
- Liiga team Former teams: Ilves; Tappara; Lahti Pelicans
- NHL draft: 130th overall, 2018; Vancouver Canucks
- Playing career: 2017–present

Toni Utunen (born 27 April 2000) is a Finnish professional ice hockey defenceman currently playing for Ilves of the Finnish Liiga.

== Playing career ==
Utunen was drafted by the Vancouver Canucks in the fifth round, 130th overall in the 2018 NHL entry draft.

Following his fifth season in the Liiga with Tappara, Utunen left the club to sign a two-year contract with fellow Liiga outfit, Lahti Pelicans, on 20 May 2021.

== International play ==
Medal record

Representing Finland

Ice hockey

World Junior Championships
Gold medal – first place	2019 Canada	

World U18 Championships
Gold medal – first place	2018 Russia	
Silver medal – second place	2017 Slovakia	

He scored the game-winning goal to eliminate Team Canada in the quarterfinals of the 2019 World Junior Ice Hockey Championships, in route to a gold medal. He also captained Team Finland to a gold medal in the 2018 IIHF World U18 Championships.

== Career statistics ==
=== Regular season and playoffs ===
			Regular season					Playoffs
Season	Team	League	GP	G	A	Pts	PIM	GP	G	A	Pts	PIM
2016–17	Tappara	Jr. A	39	1	10	11	10	2	0	0	0	0
2016–17	Tappara	Liiga	1	0	0	0	0	—	—	—	—	—
2017–18	Tappara	Liiga	11	0	0	0	0	—	—	—	—	—
2017–18	LeKi	Mestis	28	2	10	12	12	5	0	1	1	0
2017–18	Tappara	Jr. A	—	—	—	—	—	6	0	2	2	6
2018–19	Tappara	Liiga	43	1	2	3	6	11	0	0	0	4
2018–19	LeKi	Mestis	1	0	0	0	2	—	—	—	—	—
2019–20	Tappara	Liiga	32	0	3	3	6	—	—	—	—	—
2019–20	Tappara	Jr. A	—	—	—	—	—	3	0	0	0	2
2020–21	Tappara	Liiga	51	2	4	6	22	9	1	0	1	2
2021–22	Lahti Pelicans	Liiga	59	4	7	11	24	3	0	0	0	0
Liiga totals			197	7	16	23	58	23	1	0	1	6

=== International ===
Year	Team	Event	Result	GP	G	A	Pts	PIM
2016	Finland	IH18	6th	4	0	0	0	4
2017	Finland	IH18	6th	4	1	2	3	2
2017	Finland	WJC18	2nd place, silver medalist(s)	7	1	1	2	0
2018	Finland	WJC18	1st place, gold medalist(s)	7	1	2	3	0
2019	Finland	WJC	1st place, gold medalist(s)	7	1	0	1	0
2020	Finland	WJC	4th	7	0	1	1	0
Junior totals				36	4	6	10	6
