= Hanne Eilertsen =

Korean Norwegian snowboarder (born 1999)

Personal information
- Full name: Hanne Kjoll Eilertsen
- Nationality: Norwegian
- Born: 23 March 1999 (age 27) Daegu, South Korea
- Height: 156 cm (5 ft 1 in)

Hanne Kjoll Eilertsen (born 23 March 1999) is a Norwegian snowboarder. She competed in the 2022 Winter Olympics, in Women's big air and Women's slopestyle.

She competed at the 2016 Winter Youth Olympics, and 2021–22 FIS Snowboard World Cup.
