= Tuomas Harjula =

Finnish biathlete (born 1998)

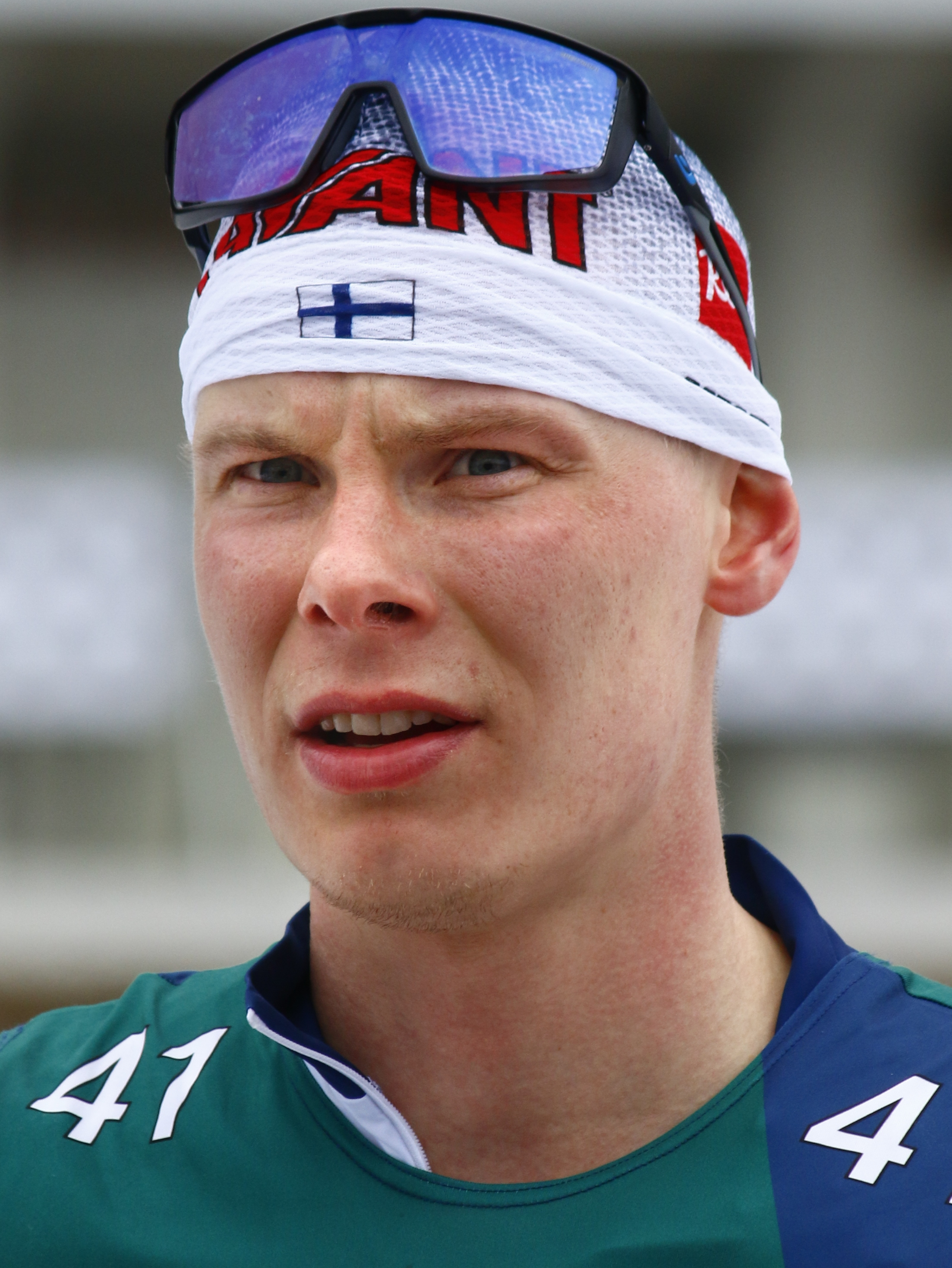
- Harjula at the BMW IBU World Championships Biathlon Nové Město 2024

Personal information
- Nationality: Finnish
- Born: 8 June 1998 (age 27) Tuusula, Finland
- Height: 5 ft 10 in (178 cm)
- Weight: 176 lb (80 kg; 12 st 8 lb)

Sport
- Country: Finland
- Sport: Biathlon

Tuomas Harjula (born 8 June 1998) is a Finnish biathlete. He has competed in the Biathlon World Cup since 2020.

== Biathlon results ==
All results are sourced from the International Biathlon Union.

=== Olympic Games ===
0 medals

| Event | Individual | Sprint | Pursuit | Mass start | Relay | Mixed relay |
|---|---|---|---|---|---|---|
| (China) 2022 Beijing | 81st | 92nd | — | — | 17th | — |
| (Italy) 2026 Milano Cortina | 15th | 21st | 21st | 15th | — | — |

=== World Championships ===
0 medals

| Event | Individual | Sprint | Pursuit | Mass start | Relay | Mixed relay | Single Mixed relay |
|---|---|---|---|---|---|---|---|
| (Slovenia) 2021 Pokljuka | 64th | 46th | 26th | — | 19th | 13th | — |
| (Germany) 2023 Oberhof | 41st | 111th | — | — | 10th | 11th | — |
| (Czech Republic) 2024 Nové Město na Moravě | — | — | — | — | — | 20th | — |

*During Olympic seasons competitions are only held for those events not included in the Olympic program.
