= Italy at the 2016 Winter Youth Olympics =

- IOC code: ITA
- NOC: Italian National Olympic Committee
- Website: www.coni.it

in Lillehammer
- Competitors: 37 in 13 sports
- Medals Ranked 15th: Gold 1 Silver 2 Bronze 6 Total 9

Winter Youth Olympics appearances
- 2012; 2016; 2020; 2024

Italy competed at the 2016 Winter Youth Olympics in Lillehammer, Norway from 12 to 21 February 2016.

== Medalists ==
Medal	Name	Sport	Event	Date
Gold	Felix Schwarz; Lukas Gufler	Luge	Doubles	15 February
Silver	Pietro Canzio	Alpine skiing	Boys' super-G	13 February
Silver	Anita Muraro	Ice hockey	Girls' individual skills challenge	16 February
Bronze	Pietro Canzio	Alpine skiing	Boys' combined	14 February
Bronze	Noemi Bonazza	Speed skating	Girls' 1500 m	15 February
Bronze	Caterina Carpano	Snowboarding	Girls' snowboard cross	15 February
Bronze	Marion Oberhofer; Fabian Malleier; Felix Schwarz; Lukas Gufler	Luge	Mixed team relay	16 February
Bronze	Lara Malsiner	Ski jumping	Girls' normal hill	16 February
Bronze	Samuela Comola; Irene Lardschneider; Cedric Christille; Patrick Braunhofer	Biathlon	Mixed relay	21 February

=== Medalists in mixed NOCs events ===
Medal	Name	Sport	Event	Date
Gold	Noemi Bonazza	Speed skating	Mixed team sprint	17 February
Bronze	Chiara Cristelli	Speed skating	Mixed team sprint	17 February

== Alpine skiing ==
Boys

Athlete	Event	Run 1		Run 2		Total	
Athlete	Event	Time	Rank	Time	Rank	Time	Rank
Pietro Canzio	Slalom	50.30	4	50.44	9	1:40.74	5
Pietro Canzio	Giant slalom	1:17.69	2	did not finish			
Pietro Canzio	Super-G	—N/a				1:10.65	2nd place, silver medalist(s)
Pietro Canzio	Combined	1:12.45	6	41.20	3	1:53.65	3rd place, bronze medalist(s)
Michael Tedde	Slalom	DNF		did not advance			
Michael Tedde	Giant slalom	1:19.92	13	1:20.04	12	2:39.96	11
Michael Tedde	Super-G	—N/a				1:11.52	7
Michael Tedde	Combined	1:12.04	2	43.08	18	1:55.12	10

Girls

Athlete	Event	Run 1		Run 2		Total	
Athlete	Event	Time	Rank	Time	Rank	Time	Rank
Sofia Pizzato	Slalom	DNF		did not advance			
Sofia Pizzato	Giant slalom	1:19.73	7	1:16.10	9	2:35.83	7
Sofia Pizzato	Super-G	—N/a				1:14.47	9
Sofia Pizzato	Combined	1:17.39	18	Disqualified			
Carlotta Saracco	Slalom	55.01	5	51.66	8	1:46.67	5
Carlotta Saracco	Giant slalom	1:19.84	8	1:16.62	12	2:36.46	10
Carlotta Saracco	Super-G	—N/a				1:16.18	15
Carlotta Saracco	Combined	1:15.72	10	44.65	8	2:00.37	7

Parallel mixed team

Athletes	Event	Round of 16	Quarterfinals	Semifinals	Final / BM	
Athletes	Event	Opposition Score	Opposition Score	Opposition Score	Opposition Score	Rank
Carlotta Saracco; Pietro Canzio	Parallel mixed team	Russia; L 0 – 4	did not advance			

== Biathlon ==
Boys

Athlete	Event	Time	Misses	Rank
Patrick Braunhofer	Sprint	19:56.7	2	9
Patrick Braunhofer	Pursuit	30:01.5	4	4
Cedric Christille	Sprint	21:03.4	2	25
Cedric Christille	Pursuit	34:04.1	8	32

Girls

Athlete	Event	Time	Misses	Rank
Samuela Comola	Sprint	18:55.2	0	6
Samuela Comola	Pursuit	25:58.5	1	5
Irene Lardschneider	Sprint	20:49.9	3	29
Irene Lardschneider	Pursuit	27:18.7	2	14

Mixed

Athletes	Event	Time	Misses	Rank
Samuela Comola; Patrick Braunhofer	Single mixed relay	43:32.7	3+13	11
Samuela Comola; Irene Lardschneider; Cedric Christille; Patrick Braunhofer	Mixed relay	1:20:06.0	0+6	3rd place, bronze medalist(s)

== Cross-country skiing ==
Boys

Athlete	Event	Qualification		Quarterfinal		Semifinal		Final	
Athlete	Event	Time	Rank	Time	Rank	Time	Rank	Time	Rank
Luca Del Fabbro	10 km freestyle	—N/a						25:20.5	10
Luca Del Fabbro	Classical sprint	3:08.01	17 Q	3:02.91	3 q	3:24.85	6	did not advance	
Luca Del Fabbro	Cross-country cross	3:13.08	12 Q	—N/a		3:08.12	3 q	3:06.23	5

Girls

Athlete	Event	Qualification		Quarterfinal		Semifinal		Final	
Athlete	Event	Time	Rank	Time	Rank	Time	Rank	Time	Rank
Chiara De Zolt Ponte	5 km freestyle	—N/a						14:18.0	19
Chiara De Zolt Ponte	Classical sprint	3:45.38	26 Q	3:43.53	5	did not advance			
Chiara De Zolt Ponte	Cross-country cross	3:45.38	13 Q	—N/a		3:39.46	3	did not advance	

== Curling ==
=== Mixed team ===
Team

- Stefania Constantini
- Martina Ghezze
- Luca Rizzolli
- Alberto Zisa

Round Robin

Group A	Skip	W	L
United States	Luc Violette	6	1
Switzerland	Selina Witschonke	6	1
Russia	Nadezhda Karelina	6	1
Turkey	Oğuzhan Karakurt	3	4
Italy	Luca Rizzolli	3	4
China	Du Hongrui	2	5
New Zealand	Matthew Neilson	1	6
Japan	Kota Ito	1	6

Draw 1

Sheet A	1	2	3	4	5	6	7	8	Final
Japan (Ito)	0	0	1	0	0	0	0	X	1
Italy (Rizzolli)	0	1	0	3	0	1	2	X	7

Draw 2

Sheet C	1	2	3	4	5	6	7	8	Final
Italy (Rizzolli)	1	0	2	2	1	1	0	X	7
New Zealand (Neilson)	0	1	0	0	0	0	1	X	2

Draw 3

Sheet D	1	2	3	4	5	6	7	8	Final
Italy (Rizzolli)	0	0	1	0	2	0	2	0	5
United States (Violette)	2	2	0	1	0	2	0	1	8

Draw 4

Sheet B	1	2	3	4	5	6	7	8	Final
China (Du)	0	1	0	0	1	1	0	X	3
Italy (Rizzolli)	1	0	2	1	0	0	2	X	6

Draw 5

Sheet D	1	2	3	4	5	6	7	8	Final
Turkey (Karakurt)	0	1	0	4	0	2	2	X	9
Italy (Rizzolli)	1	0	1	0	3	0	0	X	5

Draw 6

Sheet A	1	2	3	4	5	6	7	8	Final
Italy (Rizzolli)	1	1	0	0	1	0	0	X	3
Russia (Karelina)	0	0	2	2	0	1	0	X	5

Draw 7

Sheet C	1	2	3	4	5	6	7	8	Final
Switzerland (Witschonke)	0	2	1	0	2	3	0	1	9
Italy (Rizzolli)	0	0	0	4	0	0	2	0	6

Tiebreaker

Team	1	2	3	4	5	6	7	8	Final
Turkey (Karakurt)	1	2	0	1	0	0	2	0	6
Italy (Rizzolli)	0	0	3	0	1	0	0	1	5

=== Mixed doubles ===
Athletes	Event	Round of 32	Round of 16	Quarterfinals	Semifinals	Final / BM	
Athletes	Event	Opposition Result	Opposition Result	Opposition Result	Opposition Result	Opposition Result	Rank
Stefania Constantini (ITA); Callum Kinnear (GBR)	Mixed doubles	Burgess (CAN); Peips (EST); W 9 – 1	Karelina (RUS); Aita (JPN); W 7 – 3	Zhao (CHN); Haarstad (NOR); L 9 – 10	did not advance		
Martina Ghezze (ITA); Michael Mellemseter (NOR)	Mixed doubles	Witschonke (SUI); Gustsin (EST); L 3 – 9	did not advance				
Tova Petterson (SWE); Alberto Zisa (ITA)	Mixed doubles	Sillaots (EST); Violette (USA); L 4 – 7	did not advance				
Beyzanur Konuksever (TUR); Luca Rizzolli (ITA)	Mixed doubles	Laidsalu (EST); Maksimov (RUS); L 4 – 5	did not advance				

== Figure skating ==
Singles

Athlete	Event	SP		FS		Total	
Athlete	Event	Points	Rank	Points	Rank	Points	Rank
Adrien Bannister	Boys' singles	46.68	10	106.71	9	153.39	9
Lucrezia Gennaro	Girls' singles	47.45	11	86.73	9	134.18	9

Couples

Athletes	Event	SP/SD		FS/FD		Total	
Athletes	Event	Points	Rank	Points	Rank	Points	Rank
Irma Caldara; Edoardo Caputo	Pairs	35.49	9	64.66	9	100.15	9
Francesca Righi; Pietro Papetti	Ice dancing	38.22	12	57.32	11	95.54	12

Mixed NOC team trophy

Athletes	Event	Free skate/Free dance					
Athletes	Event	Ice dance	Pairs	Girls	Boys	Total	
Athletes	Event	Points Team points	Points Team points	Points Team points	Points Team points	Points	Rank
Team Courage; Anastasia Shpilevaya / Grigory Smirnov (RUS); Irma Caldara / Edoardo Caputo (ITA); Alexandra Hagarova (SVK); Cha Jun-hwan (KOR)	Team trophy	86.48; 8	68.81; 1	75.55; 2	139.97; 6	17	6
Team Determination; Francesca Righi / Pietro Papetti (ITA); Alina Ustimkina / Nikita Volodin (RUS); Annika Hocke (GER); Adam Siao Him Fa (FRA)	Team trophy	53.70; 1	100.98; 6	82.41; 3	97.80; 4	14	8
Team Hope; Emilia Kalehanava / Uladzislau Palkhouski (BLR); Kim Su-yeon / Kim Hyung-tae (KOR); Lucrezia Gennaro (ITA); Adrien Bannister (ITA)	Team trophy	65.42; 5	70.50; 2	83.64; 4	119.28; 5	16	7

== Freestyle skiing ==
Ski cross

Athlete	Event	Qualification		Group heats		Semifinal	Final
Athlete	Event	Time	Rank	Points	Rank	Position	Position
Tobias Knollseisen	Boys' ski cross	44.69	11	8	12	did not advance	

Slopestyle

Athlete	Event	Final			
Athlete	Event	Run 1	Run 2	Best	Rank
Sophia Insam	Girls' slopestyle	18.20	47.20	47.20	9

== Ice hockey ==
Athlete	Event	Qualification		Final	
Athlete	Event	Points	Rank	Points	Rank
Anita Muraro	Girls' individual skills challenge	12	8 Q	14	2nd place, silver medalist(s)

== Luge ==
Individual sleds

Athlete	Event	Run 1		Run 2		Total	
Athlete	Event	Time	Rank	Time	Rank	Time	Rank
Fabian Malleier	Boys	48.082	4	48.037	5	1:36.119	5
Ivan Nagler	Boys	48.105	6	48.139	6	1:36.244	7
Marion Oberhofer	Girls	53.724	8	53.830	12	1:47.554	11
Lukas Gufler; Felix Schwarz	Doubles	52.200	1	52.060	1	1:44.260	1st place, gold medalist(s)

Mixed team relay

Athlete	Event	Girls		Boys		Doubles		Total	
Athlete	Event	Time	Rank	Time	Rank	Time	Rank	Time	Rank
Marion Oberhofer; Fabian Malleier; Felix Schwarz; Lukas Gufler	Team relay	57.917	8	57.683	3	57.440	1	2:53.040	3rd place, bronze medalist(s)

== Nordic combined ==
Individual

Athlete	Event	Ski jumping				Cross-country	
Athlete	Event	Distance	Points	Rank	Deficit	Time	Rank
Aaron Kostner	Normal hill/5 km	90.0	110.5	10	1:25	14:31.4	9

Nordic mixed team

Athlete	Event	Ski jumping			Cross-country	
Athlete	Event	Points	Rank	Deficit	Time	Rank
Lara Malsiner; Aaron Kostner; Alessio Longo; Chiara De Zolt Ponte; Luca Del Fabbro	Nordic mixed team	281.2	11	2:06	28:38.0	10

== Ski jumping ==
Individual

Athlete	Event	First round			Final			Total	
Athlete	Event	Distance	Points	Rank	Distance	Points	Rank	Points	Rank
Alessio Longo	Boys' normal hill	72.5	67.8	18	71.0	58.0	18	125.8	18
Lara Malsiner	Girls' normal hill	95.5	116.3	3	94.5	115.3	2	231.6	3rd place, bronze medalist(s)

Team

Athlete	Event	First round		Final		Total	
Athlete	Event	Points	Rank	Points	Rank	Points	Rank
Lara Malsiner; Aaron Kostner; Alessio Longo	Team competition	219.7	11	259.3	10	479.0	11

== Short track speed skating ==
Girls

Athlete	Event	Quarterfinal		Semifinal		Final	
Athlete	Event	Time	Rank	Time	Rank	Time	Rank
Gloria Ioriatti	500 m	46.103	3 SC/D	PEN		did not advance	
Gloria Ioriatti	1000 m	1:43.603	3 ADV	1:39.573	5 FB	1:42.581	8

Mixed team relay

Athlete	Event	Semifinal		Final	
Athlete	Event	Time	Rank	Time	Rank
Team E Gloria Ioriatti (ITA); Anna Seidel (GER); Aaron Heo (USA); Hong Kyung-hwan (KOR)	Mixed team relay	4:16.056	2 FA	PEN	

Qualification Legend: FA=Final A (medal); FB=Final B (non-medal); FC=Final C (non-medal); FD=Final D (non-medal); SA/B=Semifinals A/B; SC/D=Semifinals C/D; ADV=Advanced to Next Round; PEN=Penalized

== Snowboarding ==
Snowboard cross

Athlete	Event	Qualification		Group heats		Semifinal	Final
Athlete	Event	Time	Rank	Points	Rank	Position	Position
Caterina Carpano	Girls' snowboard cross	52.44	7 Q	15	5 Q	2 FA	3rd place, bronze medalist(s)

Snowboard and ski cross relay

Athlete	Event	Quarterfinal	Semifinal	Final
Athlete	Event	Position	Position	Position
Caterina Carpano (ITA); Minja Lehikoinen (FIN); Yoshiki Takahara (JPN); Tobias Knollseisen (ITA)	Team snowboard ski cross	3	did not advance	

Qualification legend: FA – Qualify to medal round; FB – Qualify to consolation round

== Speed skating ==
Boys

Athlete	Event	Race 1		Race 2		Final	
Athlete	Event	Time	Rank	Time	Rank	Time	Rank
Francesco Betti	500 m	38.63	21	38.59	23	77.228	22
Francesco Betti	1500 m	—N/a				1:59.79	24
Francesco Betti	Mass start	—N/a				5:58.40	23
Jeffrey Rosanelli	500 m	37.558	14	37.61	13	75.17	14
Jeffrey Rosanelli	1500 m	—N/a				1:56.65	13
Jeffrey Rosanelli	Mass start	—N/a				6:48.52	26

Girls

Athlete	Event	Race 1		Race 2		Final	
Athlete	Event	Time	Rank	Time	Rank	Time	Rank
Noemi Bonazza	500 m	40.72	7	40.76	6	81.48	6
Noemi Bonazza	1500 m	—N/a				2:05.49	3rd place, bronze medalist(s)
Noemi Bonazza	Mass start	—N/a				5:54.82	8
Chiara Cristelli	500 m	40.89	9	41.16	10	82.05	10
Chiara Cristelli	1500 m	—N/a				2:07.16	6
Chiara Cristelli	Mass start	—N/a				5:55.36	9

Mixed team sprint

Athletes	Event	Final	
Athletes	Event	Time	Rank
Team 1 Jasmin Guentert (SUI); Kim Min-sun (KOR); Isa Izmailov (RUS); Jeffrey Rosanelli (ITA)	Mixed team sprint	1:59.75	7
Team 6 Noemi Bonazza (ITA); Sumiya Buyantogtokh (MGL); Chung Jae-woong (KOR); Shen Manyang (CHN)	Mixed team sprint	1:57.85	1st place, gold medalist(s)
Team 10; Chiara Cristelli (ITA); Mihaela Hogas (ROU); Ole Jeske (GER); Allan Johansson (NOR)	Mixed team sprint	1:58.87	3rd place, bronze medalist(s)
Team 11; Anna Nifantava (BLR); Yuna Onodera (JPN); Daan Baks (NED); Francesco Betti (ITA)	Mixed team sprint	2:00.13	9

== See also ==
- Italy at the 2016 Summer Olympics
