= Speed skating at the 2016 Winter Youth Olympics =

Speed skating events at the Olympics

Speed skating at the II Winter Youth Olympic Games
- Venue: Hamar Olympic Hall, Hamar
- Dates: 13–19 February
- Competitors: 54 from 20 nations

Speed skating at the 2016 Winter Youth Olympics was held at the Hamar Olympic Hall in Hamar, Norway between 13 and 19 February 2016.

== Medal summary ==
=== Medal table ===
* Host nation (Norway)

Rank	Nation	Gold	Silver	Bronze	Total
1	South Korea	5	1	2	8
2	China	1	3	1	5
–	Mixed-NOCs	1	1	1	3
3	Japan	0	2	0	2
4	Italy	0	0	1	1
4	Netherlands	0	0	1	1
4	Norway*	0	0	1	1
Totals (6 entries)		7	7	7	21

=== Boys' events ===
Event	Gold		Silver		Bronze	
500 metres	Li Yanzhe; China	71.95	Kazuki Sakakibara; Japan	73.97	Chung Jae-woong; South Korea	74.13
1500 metres	Kim Min-seok; South Korea	1:51.35	Daichi Horikawa; Japan	1:52.96	Daan Baks; Netherlands	1:53.29
Mass start	Kim Min-seok; South Korea	30 pts	Chung Jae-woong; South Korea	20 pts	Allan Dahl Johansson; Norway	10 pts

=== Girls' events ===
Event	Gold		Silver		Bronze	
500 metres	Kim Min-sun; South Korea	78.66	Han Mei; China	79.44	Li Huawei; China	79.75
1500 metres	Park Ji-woo; South Korea	2:03.53	Han Mei; China	2:04.48	Noemi Bonazza; Italy	2:05.49
Mass start	Park Ji-woo; South Korea	30 pts	Han Mei; China	20 pts	Kim Min-sun; South Korea	10 pts

=== Mixed event ===
Event	Gold		Silver		Bronze	
Team sprint	Team 6 (MIX); Noemi Bonazza (ITA); Buyantogtokh Sumiya (MGL); Chung Jae-woong (KOR); Shen Hanyang (CHN)	1:57.85	Team 9 (MIX); Elisa Dul (NED); Karolina Gąsecka (POL); Austin Kleba (USA); Anvar Mukhamadeyev (KAZ)	1:58.80	Team 10 (MIX); Chiara Cristelli (ITA); Mihaela Hogaş (ROU); Ole Jeske (GER); Allan Dahl Johansson (NOR)	1:58.87

== Qualification system ==
Each country could send a maximum of four athletes (two per gender) to the speed skating events of the Winter Youth Olympics. The ISU Junior World Cup competition during the season was used to qualify in the respective distances. The host country (Norway) was given at least one spot.

=== Quota Allocation ===
Quota allocation as of December 1, 2015:

NOC	Boys'	Girls'	Total
Austria	1	2	3
Belarus	2	2	4
China	2	2	4
Czech Republic		1	1
Estonia	2		2
Finland	2		2
Germany	2	2	4
Italy	2	2	4
Japan	2	2	4
Kazakhstan	1	1	2
Mongolia		1	1
Netherlands	2	2	4
Norway	2	1	3
Poland	2	2	4
Romania		1	1
Russia	2	2	4
South Korea	2	2	4
Sweden		1	1
Switzerland		1	2
United States	1		1
Total athletes	27	27	54
Total NOCs	15	17	20
