= Speed skating at the 2016 Winter Youth Olympics – Mixed team sprint =

Mixed team sprint at the II Winter Youth Olympic Games
- Venue: Hamar Olympic Hall
- Date: 17 February
- Competitors: 52 from 20 nations
- Winning time: 1:57.85

Medalists
1st place, gold medalist(s)		Buyantogtokhyn Sumiyaa; Noemi Bonazza; Shen Hanyang; Chung Jae-woong	Mixed-NOCs
2nd place, silver medalist(s)		Karolina Gąsecka; Elisa Dul; Anvar Mukhamadeyev; Austin Kleba	Mixed-NOCs
3rd place, bronze medalist(s)		Mihaela Hogaş; Chiara Cristelli; Ole Jeske; Allan Dahl Johansson	Mixed-NOCs

The mixed team sprint speed skating competition of the 2016 Winter Youth Olympics was held at Hamar Olympic Hall on 17 February 2016.

== Results ==
The races were held at 10:30.

Rank	Heat	Team	Time	Time Behind
1st place, gold medalist(s)	3	Team 6 Buyantogtokhyn Sumiyaa (MGL); Noemi Bonazza (ITA); Shen Hanyang (CHN); Chung Jae-woong (KOR)	1:57.85	
2nd place, silver medalist(s)	4	Team 9 Karolina Gąsecka (POL); Elisa Dul (NED); Anvar Mukhamadeyev (KAZ); Austin Kleba (USA)	1:58.80	+0.95
3rd place, bronze medalist(s)	5	Team 10; Mihaela Hogaş (ROU); Chiara Cristelli (ITA); Ole Jeske (GER); Allan Dahl Johansson (NOR)	1:58.87	+1.02
4	1	Team 12; Yauheniya Varabyova (BLR); Lea Scholz (GER); Lukas Mann (GER); Daichi Horikawa (JPN)	1:58.95	+1.10
5	6	Team 13; Elena Samkova (RUS); Sofya Napolskikh (RUS); Jaakko Hautamaki (FIN); Kim Min-seok (KOR)	1:58.97	+1.12
6	7	Team 3 Viola Feichtner (AUT); Li Huawei (CHN); Kazuki Sakakibara (JPN); Li Yanzhe (CHN)	1:59.20	+1.35
7	4	Team 1 Jasmin Güntert (SUI); Kim Min-sun (KOR); Isa Izmailov (RUS); Jeffrey Rosanelli (ITA)	1:59.75	+1.90
8	3	Team 4 Camilla Evjevik (NOR); Kim Min-sun (KOR); Gaweł Oficjalski (POL); Jonas Kristensen (NOR)	1:59.93	+2.08
9	7	Team 11; Hanna Nifantava (BLR); Yuna Onodera (JPN); Francesco Betti (ITA); Daan Baks (NED)	2:00.13	+2.28
10	6	Team 2 Mariya Gromova (KAZ); Han Mei (CHN); Victor Rudenko (BLR); Mathias Hauer (AUT)	2:00.79	+2.94
11	2	Team 5 Erika Lindgren (SWE); Isabelle van Elst (NED); Samuli Suomalainen (FIN); Yevgeny Bolgov (BLR)	2:16.73	+18.88
	5	Team 8 Moe Kumagai (JPN); Natálie Kerschbaummayr (CZE); Kaspar Kaljuvee (EST); Dmitry Filimonov (RUS)	DQ	
	2	Team 6 Viktoria Schinnerl (AUT); Karolina Bosiek (POL); Jan Świątek (POL); Louis Hollaar (NED)	DNF	
