= Nordic combined at the 2016 Winter Youth Olympics – Boys' normal hill individual/5 km =

Boys' individual at the II Winter Youth Olympic Games
- Venue: Lysgårdsbakken
- Date: February 16
- Competitors: 14 from 14 nations
- Winning time: 13:31.4

Medalists
1st place, gold medalist(s)		Tim Kopp	Germany
2nd place, silver medalist(s)		Ben Loomis	United States
3rd place, bronze medalist(s)		Ondřej Pažout	Czech Republic

The individual competition of the Nordic combined events at the 2016 Winter Youth Olympics in Lillehammer, Norway, was held on February 16, at the Lysgårdsbakken with one ski jump and a 5 kilometre cross-country race. 14 athletes from 14 different countries took part in this event.

== Results ==
=== Ski jumping ===
Ski jumping starts on 10:45

Rank	Bib	Name	Country	Distance (m)	Points	Time difference
1	8	Tim Kopp	Germany	99.5	131.8	
2	10	Ben Loomis	United States	98.5	129.7	+0:08
3	7	Ondřej Pažout	Czech Republic	98.0	127.0	+0:19
4	12	Lilian Vaxelaire	France	95.0	120.7	+0:44
5	4	Vid Vrhovnik	Slovenia	92.5	118.8	+0:52
6	3	Florian Dagn	Austria	92.0	117.6	+0:57
7	1	Paweł Twardosz	Poland	92.0	115.4	+1:06
8	2	Dmytro Mazurchuk	Ukraine	91.0	113.6	+1:13
9	11	Wille Karhumaa	Finland	92.5	112.7	+1:16
10	14	Aaron Kostner	Italy	90.0	110.5	+1:25
11	5	Yoshihiro Kimura	Japan	88.5	109.7	+1:28
12	13	Vitalii Ivanov	Russia	88.0	105.0	+1:47
13	6	Einar Lurås Oftebro	Norway	85.0	99.3	+2:10
14	9	Andreas Ilves	Estonia	85.5	99.0	+2:11

=== Cross-country ===
Cross-country starts on 13:30

Rank	Bib	Name	Country	Start time	Cross country time	Cross country rank	Finish time
1st place, gold medalist(s)	1	Tim Kopp	Germany	0:00	13:31.4	12	13:31.4
2nd place, silver medalist(s)	2	Ben Loomis	United States	0:08	13:28.6	8	+5.2
3rd place, bronze medalist(s)	3	Ondřej Pažout	Czech Republic	0:19	13:20.3	7	+7.9
4	6	Florian Dagn	Austria	0:57	13:18.8	6	+44.4
5	5	Vid Vrhovnik	Slovenia	0:52	13:30.2	10	+50.8
6	7	Paweł Twardosz	Poland	1:06	13:18.4	5	+53.0
7	8	Dmytro Mazurchuk	Ukraine	1:13	13:12.3	4	+53.9
8	9	Wille Karhumaa	Finland	1:16	13:11.1	3	+55.7
9	10	Aaron Kostner	Italy	1:25	13:06.4	1	+1:00.0
10	4	Lilian Vaxelaire	France	0:44	13:57.3	13	+1:09.9
11	11	Yoshihiro Kimura	Japan	1:28	13:30.5	11	+1:27.1
12	12	Vitalii Ivanov	Russia	1:47	13:29.5	9	+1:45.1
13	14	Andreas Ilves	Estonia	2:11	13:08.0	2	+1:47.6
14	13	Einar Lurås Oftebro	Norway	2:10	13:59.0	14	+2:37.6
