= Speed skating at the 2016 Winter Youth Olympics – Boys' 500 metres =

Boys' 500 metres at the II Winter Youth Olympic Games
- Venue: Hamar Olympic Hall
- Date: 13 February
- Competitors: 27 from 15 nations
- Winning time: 71.95

Medalists
| 1st place, gold medalist(s) | | Li Yanzhe | China |
| 2nd place, silver medalist(s) | | Kazuki Sakakibara | Japan |
| 3rd place, bronze medalist(s) | | Chung Jae-woong | South Korea |

The boys' 500 metres speed skating competition of the 2016 Winter Youth Olympics was held at Hamar Olympic Hall on 13 February 2016.

== Results ==
The races were held at 12:39.

| Rank | Name | Country | Pair | Lane | Race 1 | Rank | Pair | Lane | Race 2 | Rank | Total | Time Behind |
|---|---|---|---|---|---|---|---|---|---|---|---|---|
| 1st place, gold medalist(s) | Li Yanzhe | China | 12 | o | 35.98 | 1 | 14 | i | 35.96 | 1 | 71.95 | |
| 2nd place, silver medalist(s) | Kazuki Sakakibara | Japan | 14 | i | 36.84 | 2 | 14 | o | 37.12 | 7 | 73.97 | +2.02 |
| 3rd place, bronze medalist(s) | Chung Jae-woong | South Korea | 7 | o | 37.24 | 6 | 11 | i | 36.89 | 3 | 74.13 | +2.18 |
| 4 | Samuli Suomalainen | Finland | 13 | o | 37.11 | 3 | 13 | i | 37.06 | 5 | 74.17 | +2.22 |
| 5 | Kim Min-seok | South Korea | 13 | i | 37.15 | 5 | 13 | o | 37.07 | 6 | 74.22 | +2.27 |
| 6 | Austin Kleba | United States | 11 | o | 37.14 | 4 | 12 | i | 37.19 | 9 | 74.34 | +2.39 |
| 7 | Dmitry Filimonov | Russia | 10 | o | 37.544 | 12 | 8 | i | 36.837 | 2 | 74.381 | +2.43 |
| 8 | Daichi Horikawa | Japan | 8 | o | 37.350 | 8 | 10 | i | 37.036 | 4 | 74.386 | +2.43 |
| 9 | Gaweł Oficjalski | Poland | 11 | i | 37.26 | 7 | 12 | o | 37.22 | 10 | 74.49 | +2.54 |
| 10 | Daan Baks | Netherlands | 14 | o | 37.44 | 10 | 9 | i | 37.14 | 8 | 74.59 | +2.64 |
| 11 | Isa Izmailov | Russia | 9 | i | 37.49 | 11 | 10 | o | 37.40 | 11 | 74.89 | +2.94 |
| 12 | Allan Dahl Johansson | Norway | 8 | i | 37.55 | 13 | 9 | o | 37.49 | 12 | 75.05 | +3.10 |
| 13 | Louis Hollaar | Netherlands | 12 | i | 37.41 | 9 | 11 | o | 37.73 | 14 | 75.14 | +3.19 |
| 14 | Jeffrey Rosanelli | Italy | 9 | o | 37.55 | 14 | 7 | i | 37.61 | 13 | 75.17 | +3.22 |
| 15 | Jonas Kristensen | Norway | 3 | o | 37.96 | 15 | 6 | i | 37.830 | 15 | 75.79 | +3.84 |
| 16 | Ole Jeske | Germany | 5 | i | 38.26 | 16 | 8 | o | 38.03 | 18 | 76.30 | +4.35 |
| 17 | Yevgeny Bolgov | Belarus | 5 | o | 38.59 | 20 | 5 | i | 37.839 | 16 | 76.43 | +4.48 |
| 18 | Victor Rudenko | Belarus | 7 | i | 38.51 | 18 | 6 | o | 37.93 | 17 | 76.44 | +4.49 |
| 19 | Shen Hanyang | China | 10 | i | 38.44 | 17 | 7 | o | 38.33 | 19 | 76.78 | +4.83 |
| 20 | Mathias Hauer | Austria | 6 | o | 38.71 | 23 | 2 | i | 38.41 | 20 | 77.13 | +5.18 |
| 21 | Jan Świątek | Poland | 4 | o | 38.71 | 22 | 3 | i | 38.49 | 21 | 77.21 | +5.26 |
| 22 | Francesco Betti | Italy | 2 | o | 38.638 | 21 | 4 | i | 38.590 | 23 | 77.228 | +5.27 |
| 23 | Anvar Mukhamadeyev | Kazakhstan | 6 | i | 38.720 | 24 | 4 | o | 38.509 | 22 | 77.229 | +5.27 |
| 24 | Kaspar Kaljuvee | Estonia | 3 | i | 38.55 | 19 | 5 | o | 38.79 | 24 | 77.34 | +5.39 |
| 25 | Lukas Mann | Germany | 4 | i | 39.38 | 25 | 3 | o | 39.51 | 25 | 78.90 | +6.95 |
| 26 | Jaakko Hautamaki | Finland | 2 | i | 39.55 | 26 | 2 | o | 39.79 | 26 | 79.35 | +7.40 |
| 27 | Kermo Voitka | Estonia | 1 | i | 39.89 | 27 | 1 | o | 39.91 | 27 | 79.81 | +7.86 |
