= Speed skating at the 2016 Winter Youth Olympics – Boys' mass start =

Boys' mass start at the II Winter Youth Olympic Games
- Venue: Hamar Olympic Hall
- Date: 19 February
- Competitors: 26 from 15 nations
- Winning points: 30

Medalists
1st place, gold medalist(s)		Kim Min-seok	South Korea
2nd place, silver medalist(s)		Chung Jae-woong	South Korea
3rd place, bronze medalist(s)		Allan Dahl Johansson	Norway

The boys' mass start speed skating competition of the 2016 Winter Youth Olympics was held at Hamar Olympic Hall on 19 February 2016.

== Results ==
The races were held at 11:02.

Rank	Name	Country	Laps	Time	Points
1st place, gold medalist(s)	Kim Min-seok	South Korea	10		30
2nd place, silver medalist(s)	Chung Jae-woong	South Korea	10		20
3rd place, bronze medalist(s)	Allan Dahl Johansson	Norway	10		10
4	Yevgeny Bolgov	Belarus	10		5
5	Ole Jeske	Germany	10		3
6	Lukas Mann	Germany	10		1
7	Daichi Horikawa	Japan	10	5:53.03	0
8	Shen Hanyang	China	10	5:53.03	0
9	Louis Hollaar	Netherlands	10	5:53.37	0
10	Isa Izmailov	Russia	10	5:53.39	0
11	Kaspar Kaljuvee	Estonia	10	5:53.47	0
12	Li Yanzhe	China	10	5:53.73	0
13	Daan Baks	Netherlands	10	5:54.35	0
14	Gaweł Oficjalski	Poland	10	5:54.51	0
15	Victor Rudenko	Belarus	10	5:54.86	0
16	Jan Świątek	Poland	10	5:54.91	0
17	Samuli Suomalainen	Finland	10	5:55.01	0
18	Jonas Kristensen	Norway	10	5:55.05	0
19	Dmitry Filimonov	Russia	10	5:55.85	0
20	Jaakko Hautamaki	Finland	10	5:56.65	0
21	Anvar Mukhamadeyev	Kazakhstan	10	5:58.17	0
22	Kermo Voitka	Estonia	10	5:58.28	0
23	Francesco Betti	Italy	10	5:58.40	0
24	Austin Kleba	United States	10	6:01.63	0
25	Mathias Hauer	Austria	10	6:34.52	0
26	Jeffrey Rosanelli	Italy	10	6:48.52	0
