= Speed skating at the 2016 Winter Youth Olympics – Boys' 1500 metres =

Boys' 1500 metres at the II Winter Youth Olympic Games
- Venue: Hamar Olympic Hall
- Date: 15 February
- Competitors: 27 from 15 nations
- Winning time: 1:51.35

Medalists
1st place, gold medalist(s)		Kim Min-seok	South Korea
2nd place, silver medalist(s)		Daichi Horikawa	Japan
3rd place, bronze medalist(s)		Daan Baks	Netherlands

The boys' 1500 metres speed skating competition of the 2016 Winter Youth Olympics was held at Hamar Olympic Hall on 15 February 2016.

== Results ==
The races were held at 11:35.

Rank	Pair	Lane	Name	Country	Time	Time Behind
1st place, gold medalist(s)	11	i	Kim Min-seok	South Korea	1:51.35	
2nd place, silver medalist(s)	12	o	Daichi Horikawa	Japan	1:52.96	+1.61
3rd place, bronze medalist(s)	7	i	Daan Baks	Netherlands	1:53.29	+1.94
4	13	i	Allan Dahl Johansson	Norway	1:53.37	+2.02
5	9	o	Austin Kleba	United States	1:53.87	+2.52
6	14	i	Dmitry Filimonov	Russia	1:54.22	+2.87
7	10	o	Louis Hollaar	Netherlands	1:55.45	+4.10
8	13	o	Chung Jae-woong	South Korea	1:55.57	+4.22
9	14	o	Yevgeny Bolgov	Belarus	1:55.88	+4.53
10	5	i	Jonas Kristensen	Norway	1:56.16	+4.81
11	1	i	Li Yanzhe	China	1:56.24	+4.89
12	6	o	Victor Rudenko	Belarus	1:56.52	+5.17
13	10	i	Jeffrey Rosanelli	Italy	1:56.65	+5.30
14	11	o	Isa Izmailov	Russia	1:56.66	+5.31
15	12	i	Mathias Hauer	Austria	1:56.77	+5.42
16	8	i	Kazuki Sakakibara	Japan	1:57.26	+5.91
17	6	i	Gaweł Oficjalski	Poland	1:57.31	+5.96
18	4	i	Samuli Suomalainen	Finland	1:57.36	+6.01
19	7	o	Shen Hanyang	China	1:57.72	+6.37
20	5	o	Jan Świątek	Poland	1:57.73	+6.38
21	9	i	Kaspar Kaljuvee	Estonia	1:57.77	+6.42
22	4	o	Anvar Mukhamadeyev	Kazakhstan	1:59.51	+8.16
23	3	o	Ole Jeske	Germany	1:59.78	+8.43
24	3	i	Francesco Betti	Italy	1:59.79	+8.44
25	8	o	Lukas Mann	Germany	1:59.99	+8.64
26	2	i	Jaakko Hautamaki	Finland	2:02.62	+11.27
27	2	o	Kermo Voitka	Estonia	2:05.30	+13.95
