= Nordic combined at the 2016 Winter Youth Olympics – Nordic mixed team normal hill/3 × 3.3 km =

Nordic mixed team normal hill/3 × 3.3 km at the II Winter Youth Olympic Games
- Venue: Lysgårdsbakken; Birkebeineren Ski Stadium
- Date: 19 February
- Competitors: 55 from 11 nations
- Winning time: 26:16.9

Medalists
1st place, gold medalist(s)		Sofia Tikhonova; Vitalii Ivanov; Maksim Sergeev; Maya Yakunina; Igor Fedotov	Russia
2nd place, silver medalist(s)		Anna Odine Strøm; Einar Lurås Oftebro; Marius Lindvik; Martine Engebretsen; Vebjoern Hegdal	Norway
3rd place, bronze medalist(s)		Agnes Reisch; Tim Kopp; Jonathan Siegel; Anna-Maria Dietze; Philipp Unger	Germany

The Nordic mixed team normal hill/3 × 3.3 km competition at the 2016 Winter Youth Olympics in Lillehammer, Norway was held on 19 February at Lysgårdsbakken and Birkebeineren Ski Stadium.

== Results ==
=== Ski jumping ===
The ski jumping part was held at 11:00.

Rank	Bib	Country	Distance (m)	Points	Time difference
1	6; 6–1; 6–2; 6–3	Slovenia; Ema Klinec; Vid Vrhovnik; Bor Pavlovčič	97.5; 94.5; 100.0	375.7; 128.2; 117.1; 130.4	
2	11; 11–1; 11–2; 11–3	Germany; Agnes Reisch; Tim Kopp; Jonathan Siegel	89.5; 98.0; 95.0	356.1; 107.6; 126.9; 121.6	+0:26
3	9; 9–1; 9–2; 9–3	Austria; Julia Huber; Florian Dagn; Clemens Leitner	85.0; 98.5; 98.0	351.5; 95.7; 127.4; 128.4	+0:32
4	8; 8–1; 8–2; 8–3	Russia; Sofia Tikhonova; Vitalii Ivanov; Maksim Sergeev	98.0; 93.0; 93.0	349.6; 127.3; 112.1; 110.2	+0:35
5	7; 7–1; 7–2; 7–3	Czech Republic; Zdeňka Pešatová; Ondřej Pažout; František Holík	85.0; 100.5; 95.0	343.4; 97.5; 126.5; 119.4	+0:43
6	4; 4–1; 4–2; 4–3	Norway; Anna Odine Strøm; Einar Lurås Oftebro; Marius Lindvik	85.0; 89.5; 101.0	337.8; 98.4; 108.5; 130.9	+0:51
7	2; 2–1; 2–2; 2–3	France; Romane Dieu; Lilian Vaxelaire; Jonathan Learoyd	88.0; 91.5; 95.5	330.8; 100.3; 111.4; 119.1	+1:00
8	10; 10–1; 10–2; 10–3	Japan; Shihori Oi; Yoshihiro Kimura; Masamitsu Itō	79.0; 92.0; 94.0	314.2; 82.8; 113.1; 118.3	+1:22
9	5; 5–1; 5–2; 5–3	Poland; Kinga Rajda; Paweł Twardosz; Dawid Jarząbek	85.0; 89.5; 86.5	305.2; 96.8; 107.4; 101.0	+1:34
10	3; 3–1; 3–2; 3–3	United States; Logan Sankey; Ben Loomis; Casey Larson	74.0; 87.0; 92.5	286.2; 71.5; 102.4; 112.3	+1:59
11	1; 1–1; 1–2; 1–3	Italy; Lara Malsiner; Aaron Kostner; Alessio Longo	89.5; 92.5; 72.0	281.2; 104.4; 114.0; 62.8	+2:06

=== Cross-country ===
The cross-country part was held at 13:30.

Rank	Bib	Country	Start time	Cross-country time	Rank	Finish time	Deficit
1st place, gold medalist(s)	4; 4–1; 4–2; 4–3	Russia; Maya Yakunina; Vitalii Ivanov; Igor Fedotov	+0:35	25:41.9; 8:45.1; 8:42.2; 8:14.6	1	26:16.9	
2nd place, silver medalist(s)	6; 6–1; 6–2; 6–3	Norway; Martine Engebretsen; Einar Lurås Oftebro; Vebjørn Hegdal	+0:51	25:47.0; 9:26.9; 8:35.3; 7:44.8	2	26:38.0	+21.1
3rd place, bronze medalist(s)	2; 2–1; 2–2; 2–3	Germany; Anna-Maria Dietze; Tim Kopp; Philipp Unger	+0:26	26:12.4; 9:12.0; 8:46.9; 8:13.5	3	26:38.4	+21.5
4	1; 1–1; 1–2; 1–3	Slovenia; Anja Mandeljc; Vid Vrhovnik; Luka Markun	0:00	26:38.5; 9:19.5; 8:52.3; 8:26.7	6	26:38.5	+21.6
5	3; 3–1; 3–2; 3–3	Austria; Anna Juppe; Florian Dagn; Florian Schwentner	+0:32	26:39.8; 9:46.3; 8:35.7; 8:17.8	8	27:11.8	+54.9
6	7; 7–1; 7–2; 7–3	France; Juliette Ducordeau; Lilian Vaxelaire; Jeremy Royer	+1:00	26:48.1; 9:14.9; 9:11.8; 8:21.4	9	27:48.1	+1:31.2
7	8; 8–1; 8–2; 8–3	Japan; Hikari Miyazaki; Yoshihiro Kimura; Riku Kasahara	+1:22	26:39.7; 9:32.6; 8:39.6; 8:27.5	7	28:01.7	+1:44.8
8	10; 10–1; 10–2; 10–3	United States; Hannah Halvorsen; Ben Loomis; Hunter Wonders	+1:59	26:27.7; 9:43.1; 8:45.0; 7:59.6	4	28:26.7	+2:09.8
9	9; 9–1; 9–2; 9–3	Poland; Klaudia Kołodziej; Paweł Twardosz; Mateusz Haratyk	+1:34	26:55.1; 10:13.4; 8:37.0; 8:04.7	10	28:29.10	+2:12.2
10	11; 11–1; 11–2; 11–3	Italy; Chiara De Zolt Ponte; Aaron Kostner; Luca Del Fabbro	+2:06	26:32.0; 9:47.9; 8:30.1; 8:14.0	5	28:38.0	+2:21.1
	5; 5–1; 5–2; 5–3	Czech Republic; Barbora Havlíčková; Ondřej Pažout; Adam Matouš	+0:43	Did Not Start			
