= Mongolia at the 2016 Winter Youth Olympics =

- IOC code: MGL
- NOC: Mongolian National Olympic Committee

in Lillehammer
- Competitors: 2 in 2 sports
- Medals: Gold 0 Silver 0 Bronze 0 Total 0

Winter Youth Olympics appearances
- 2012; 2016; 2020; 2024

Mongolia competed at the 2016 Winter Youth Olympics in Lillehammer, Norway from 12 to 21 February 2016.

== Medalists in mixed NOCs events ==
Medal	Name	Sport	Event	Date	Ref.
Gold	Buyantogtokhyn Sumiyaa	Speed skating	Mixed team sprint	17 February	

== Cross-country skiing ==
Boys

Athlete	Event	Qualification		Quarterfinal		Semifinal		Final	
Athlete	Event	Time	Rank	Time	Rank	Time	Rank	Time	Rank
Adiyabaataryn Ochirsükh	10 km freestyle	—N/a						28:07.5	41
Adiyabaataryn Ochirsükh	Classical sprint	3:33.53	43	did not advance					
Adiyabaataryn Ochirsükh	Cross-country cross	3:43.82	48	—N/a		did not advance			

== Speed skating ==
Girls

Athlete	Event	Race 1		Race 2		Final	
Athlete	Event	Time	Rank	Time	Rank	Time	Rank
Buyantogtokhyn Sumiyaa	500 m	43.38	23	42.91	21	86.295	21
Buyantogtokhyn Sumiyaa	1500 m	—N/a				2:18.42	24
Buyantogtokhyn Sumiyaa	Mass start	—N/a				6:05.11	21

Mixed team sprint

Athletes	Event	Final	
Athletes	Event	Time	Rank
Team 6 Noemi Bonazza (ITA); Buyantogtokhyn Sumiyaa (MGL); Chung Jae-woong (KOR); Shen Manyang (CHN)	Mixed team sprint	1:57.85	1st place, gold medalist(s)

== See also ==
- Mongolia at the 2016 Summer Olympics
