= Biathlon at the 2016 Winter Youth Olympics – Girls' sprint =

Girls' sprint at the II Winter Youth Olympic Games
- Venue: Birkebeineren Ski Stadium
- Date: 14 February
- Competitors: 49 from 29 nations
- Winning time: 18:23.5

Medalists
1st place, gold medalist(s)		Juliane Frühwirt	Germany
2nd place, silver medalist(s)		Marthe Kråkstad Johansen	Norway
3rd place, bronze medalist(s)		Arina Pantova	Kazakhstan

The girls' 6 km sprint biathlon competition at the 2016 Winter Youth Olympics was held on 14 February at the Birkebeineren Ski Stadium.

== Results ==
The race was started at 14:45.

Rank	Bib	Name	Country	Time	Penalties (P+S)	Deficit
1st place, gold medalist(s)	43	Juliane Frühwirt	Germany	18:23.5	0 (0+0)	–
2nd place, silver medalist(s)	46	Marthe Kråkstad Johansen	Norway	18:29.1	1 (0+1)	+5.6
3rd place, bronze medalist(s)	48	Arina Pantova	Kazakhstan	18:40.6	2 (1+1)	+17.1
4	16	Khrystyna Dmytrenko	Ukraine	18:46.7	1 (1+0)	+23.2
5	36	Lou Jeanmonnot-Laurent	France	18:52.6	1 (0+1)	+29.1
6	37	Samuela Comola	Italy	18:55.2	0 (0+0)	+31.7
7	12	Marit Øygard	Norway	19:00.7	2 (1+1)	+37.2
8	19	Gilonne Guigonnat	France	19:02.6	3 (2+1)	+39.1
9	23	Meng Fanqi	China	19:14.0	1 (0+1)	+50.5
10	20	Amanda Kautzer	United States	19:22.4	2 (1+1)	+58.9
11	29	Mariya Abe	South Korea	19:24.7	0 (0+0)	+1:01.2
12	44	Anastasiia Khaliullina	Russia	19:27.2	2 (1+1)	+1:03.7
13	25	Jenni Keranen	Finland	19:30.3	1 (0+1)	+1:06.8
14	47	Tereza Vinklárková	Czech Republic	19:36.5	2 (1+1)	+1:13.0
15	6	Yevgeniya Krassikova	Kazakhstan	19:37.8	2 (0+2)	+1:14.3
16	10	Darcie Morton	Australia	19:43.3	1 (0+1)	+1:19.8
17	28	Ekaterina Ponedelko	Russia	19:50.8	2 (1+1)	+1:27.3
18	13	Anneliis Viilukas	Estonia	19:52.9	3 (1+2)	+1:29.4
19	22	Petra Suchá	Czech Republic	19:53.6	2 (2+0)	+1:30.1
20	34	Moa Olsson	Sweden	19:54.9	2 (1+1)	+1:31.4
21	9	Tais Vozelj	Slovenia	19:56.5	2 (0+2)	+1:33.0
22	49	Chloe Levins	United States	19:56.6	2 (0+2)	+1:33.1
23	2	Darya Iyeropes	Belarus	20:04.1	2 (0+2)	+1:40.6
24	24	Milena Todorova	Bulgaria	20:04.7	3 (0+3)	+1:41.2
25	3	Sanna Sjödén	Sweden	20:31.0	5 (3+2)	+2:07.5
26	40	Maria Zdravkova	Bulgaria	20:38.2	3 (2+1)	+2:14.7
27	45	Liubov Kypiachenkova	Ukraine	20:39.0	4 (2+2)	+2:15.5
28	4	Lea Wörter	Austria	20:44.9	1 (0+1)	+2:21.4
29	1	Irene Lardschneider	Italy	20:49.9	3 (0+3)	+2:26.4
30	17	Gillian Gowling	Canada	20:51.3	0 (0+0)	+2:27.8
31	32	Joanna Jakieła	Poland	20:52.7	5 (2+3)	+2:29.2
32	42	Saana Lahdelma	Finland	20:56.5	4 (1+3)	+2:33.0
33	8	Franziska Pfnuer	Germany	21:02.0	4 (2+2)	+2:38.5
34	39	Natallia Karnitskaya	Belarus	21:02.7	5 (2+3)	+2:39.2
35	41	Tekarra Benser	Canada	21:05.7	2 (0+2)	+2:42.2
36	38	Henrieta Horvátová	Slovakia	21:06.7	3 (2+1)	+2:43.2
37	31	Marion Berger	Austria	21:14.8	2 (2+0)	+2:51.3
38	30	Hanna Moor	Estonia	21:20.7	2 (0+2)	+2:57.2
39	27	Enikő Márton	Romania	21:22.3	4 (2+2)	+2:58.8
40	5	Veronika Haidelmeierová	Slovakia	21:25.3	2 (2+0)	+3:01.8
41	11	Flavia Barmettler	Switzerland	21:34.4	4 (2+2)	+3:10.9
42	33	Anja Fischer	Switzerland	21:34.4	2 (1+1)	+3:10.9
43	21	Mirella Veres	Hungary	22:01.9	3 (1+2)	+3:38.4
44	35	Vitalija Kutkauskaitė	Lithuania	22:03.1	1 (0+1)	+3:39.6
45	7	Nora Viktorija Osīte	Latvia	22:12.5	2 (0+2)	+3:49.0
46	18	Natalia Tomaszewska	Poland	22:41.9	7 (4+3)	+4:18.4
47	14	Nadežda Derendiajeva	Lithuania	22:52.6	4 (2+2)	+4:29.1
48	26	Teodora Đukić	Bosnia and Herzegovina	25:04.4	4 (1+3)	+6:40.9
49	15	Kunduz Abdykadyrova	Kyrgyzstan	26:21.2	4 (0+4)	+7:57.7
