= Romania at the 2016 Winter Youth Olympics =

- IOC code: ROU
- NOC: Romanian Olympic and Sports Committee
- Website: www.cosr.ro

in Lillehammer
- Competitors: 22 in 9 sports
- Medals Ranked 17th: Gold 1 Silver 0 Bronze 0 Total 1

Winter Youth Olympics appearances
- 2012; 2016; 2020; 2024

Romania competed at the 2016 Winter Youth Olympics in Lillehammer, Norway from 12 to 21 February 2016.

== Medalists ==
Medal	Name	Sport	Event	Date
Gold	Eduard Casaneanu	Ice hockey	Boys' individual skills challenge	18 February

=== Medalists in mixed NOCs events ===
Medal	Name	Sport	Event	Date
Bronze	Mihaela Hogas	Speed skating	Mixed team sprint	17 February

== Alpine skiing ==
Boys

Athlete	Event	Run 1		Run 2		Total	
Athlete	Event	Time	Rank	Time	Rank	Time	Rank
Alexandru Stefanescu	Slalom	55.70	35	did not finish			
Alexandru Stefanescu	Giant slalom	DNF		did not advance			
Alexandru Stefanescu	Super-G	—				DNF	
Alexandru Stefanescu	Combined	1:18.57	41	45.96	26	2:04.53	27

Girls

Athlete	Event	Run 1		Run 2		Total	
Athlete	Event	Time	Rank	Time	Rank	Time	Rank
Iulia Boier	Slalom	DNF		did not advance			
Iulia Boier	Giant slalom	1:33.34	35	did not finish			
Iulia Boier	Super-G	—				1:24.65	36
Iulia Boier	Combined	1:24.91	32	54.05	22	2:18.96	23

== Biathlon ==
Boys

Athlete	Event	Time	Misses	Rank
Daniel Munteanu	Sprint	21:02.1	2	24
Daniel Munteanu	Pursuit	33:13.9	6	27

Girls

Athlete	Event	Time	Misses	Rank
Eniko Marton	Sprint	21:22.3	4	39
Eniko Marton	Pursuit	31:02.7	7	36

Mixed

Athletes	Event	Time	Misses	Rank
Eniko Marton; Daniel Munteanu	Single mixed relay	45:07.4	4+18	15

== Bobsleigh ==
Athlete	Event	Run 1		Run 2		Total	
Athlete	Event	Time	Rank	Time	Rank	Time	Rank
Mihai Tentea	Boys'	57.42	4	57.20	3	1:54.62	4
Daniela Gheaus	Girls'	59.55	9	59.65	12	1:59.20	11

== Cross-country skiing ==
Boys

Athlete	Event	Qualification		Quarterfinal		Semifinal		Final	
Athlete	Event	Time	Rank	Time	Rank	Time	Rank	Time	Rank
Iulian Ababei	10 km freestyle	—						28:13.3	42
Iulian Ababei	Classical sprint	3:26.46	39	did not advance					
Iulian Ababei	Cross-country cross	3:36.48	41	—		did not advance			

Girls

Athlete	Event	Qualification		Quarterfinal		Semifinal		Final	
Athlete	Event	Time	Rank	Time	Rank	Time	Rank	Time	Rank
Nicoleta Sovarschi	5 km freestyle	—						16:02.6	39
Nicoleta Sovarschi	Classical sprint	4:08.05	38	did not advance					
Nicoleta Sovarschi	Cross-country cross	4:05.87	31	—		did not advance			

== Ice hockey ==
Athlete	Event	Qualification		Final	
Athlete	Event	Points	Rank	Points	Rank
Eduard Casaneanu	Boys' individual skills challenge	18	2 Q	14	1st place, gold medalist(s)
Diana-Alexandra Iuga	Girls' individual skills challenge	7	14	did not advance	

== Luge ==
Individual sleds

Athlete	Event	Run 1		Run 2		Total	
Athlete	Event	Time	Rank	Time	Rank	Time	Rank
Theodor Turea	Boys	did not finish					
Mihaela Manolescu	Girls	43.950	13	53.777	11	1:47.727	12
Flavius Craciun; Vasile Gitlan	Doubles	52.772	3	52.707	4	1:45,479	4

Mixed team relay

Athlete	Event	Girls		Boys		Doubles		Total	
Athlete	Event	Time	Rank	Time	Rank	Time	Rank	Time	Rank
Mihaela Manolescu; Theodor Turea; Vasile Gitlan; Flavius Craciun	Team relay	58.032	9	58.462	7	58.767	5	2:55.261	6

== Skeleton ==
Athlete	Event	Run 1		Run 2		Total	
Athlete	Event	Time	Rank	Time	Rank	Time	Rank
Mihail Enache	Boys	55.58	14	55.59	13	1:51.17	14
Mihai Trasnea	Boys	55.73	16	56.21	17	1:51.94	16
Daria Miroiu	Girls	56.86	10	57.16	14	1:54.02	11
Diana Puscasu	Girls	56.73	8	56.45	7	1:53.18	7
Alexandra Vicol	Girls	56.50	7	57.80	17	1:54.30	15

== Ski jumping ==
Athlete	Event	First round			Final			Total	
Athlete	Event	Distance	Points	Rank	Distance	Points	Rank	Points	Rank
Nicolae Mitrofan	Boys' normal hill	84.0	91.0	15	81.5	89.7	15	180.7	15
Andreea Trambitas	Girls' normal hill	83.0	88.8	9	82.0	88.1	9	176.9	9

== Speed skating ==
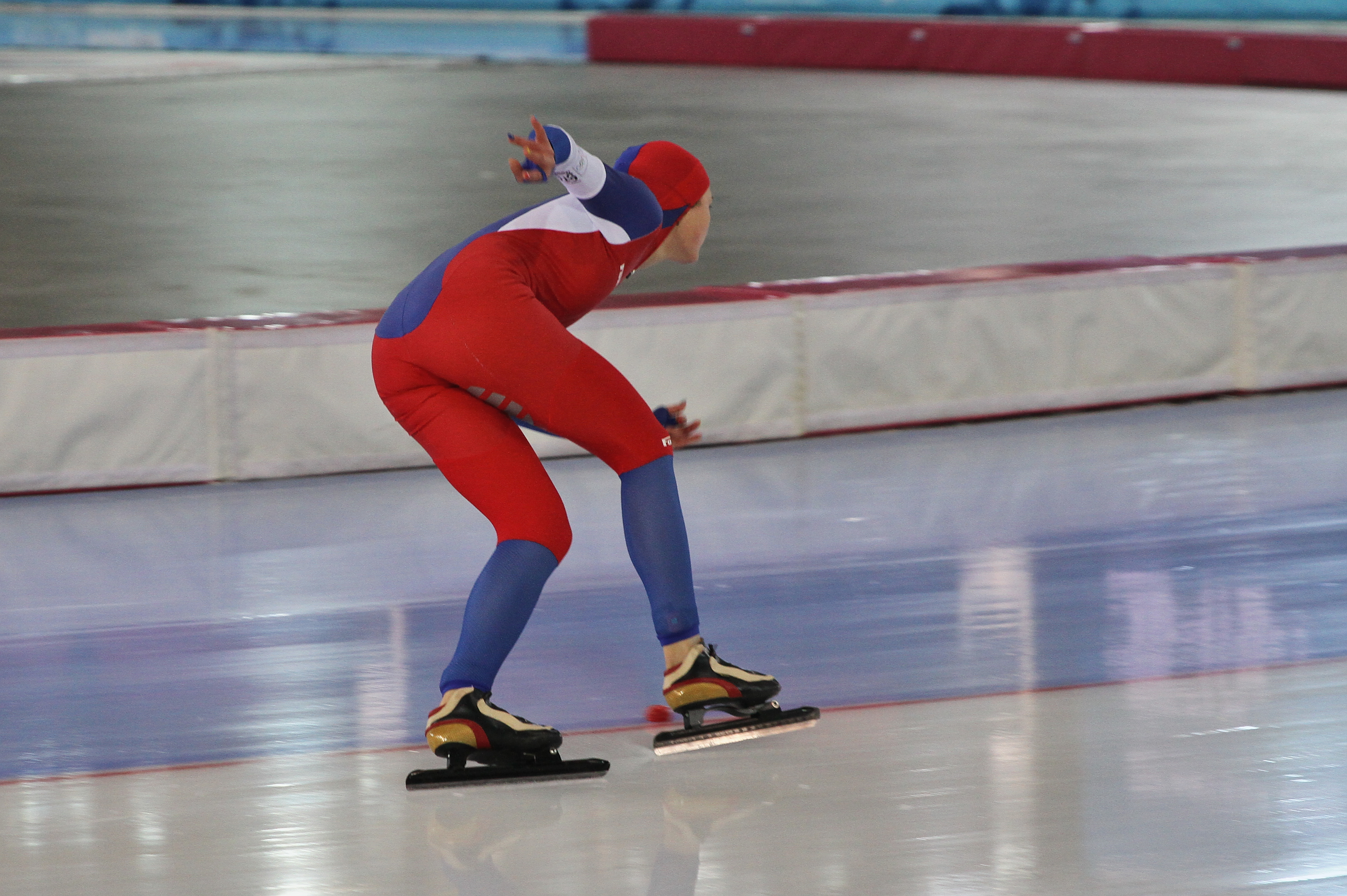
Mihaela Hogaş during her second 500 meter.

Girls

Athlete	Event	Race 1		Race 2		Final	
Athlete	Event	Time	Rank	Time	Rank	Time	Rank
Mihaela Hogas	500 m	42.27	16	42.11	17	84.38	17
Mihaela Hogas	1500 m	—				2:14.61	21
Mihaela Hogas	Mass start	—				Overtime	24

Mixed team sprint

Athletes	Event	Final	
Athletes	Event	Time	Rank
Team 10; Chiara Cristelli (ITA); Mihaela Hogas (ROU); Ole Jeske (GER); Allan Johansson (NOR)	Mixed team sprint	1:58.87	3rd place, bronze medalist(s)

== See also ==
- Romania at the 2016 Summer Olympics
