= Tabea Botthof =

German ice hockey player (born 2000)

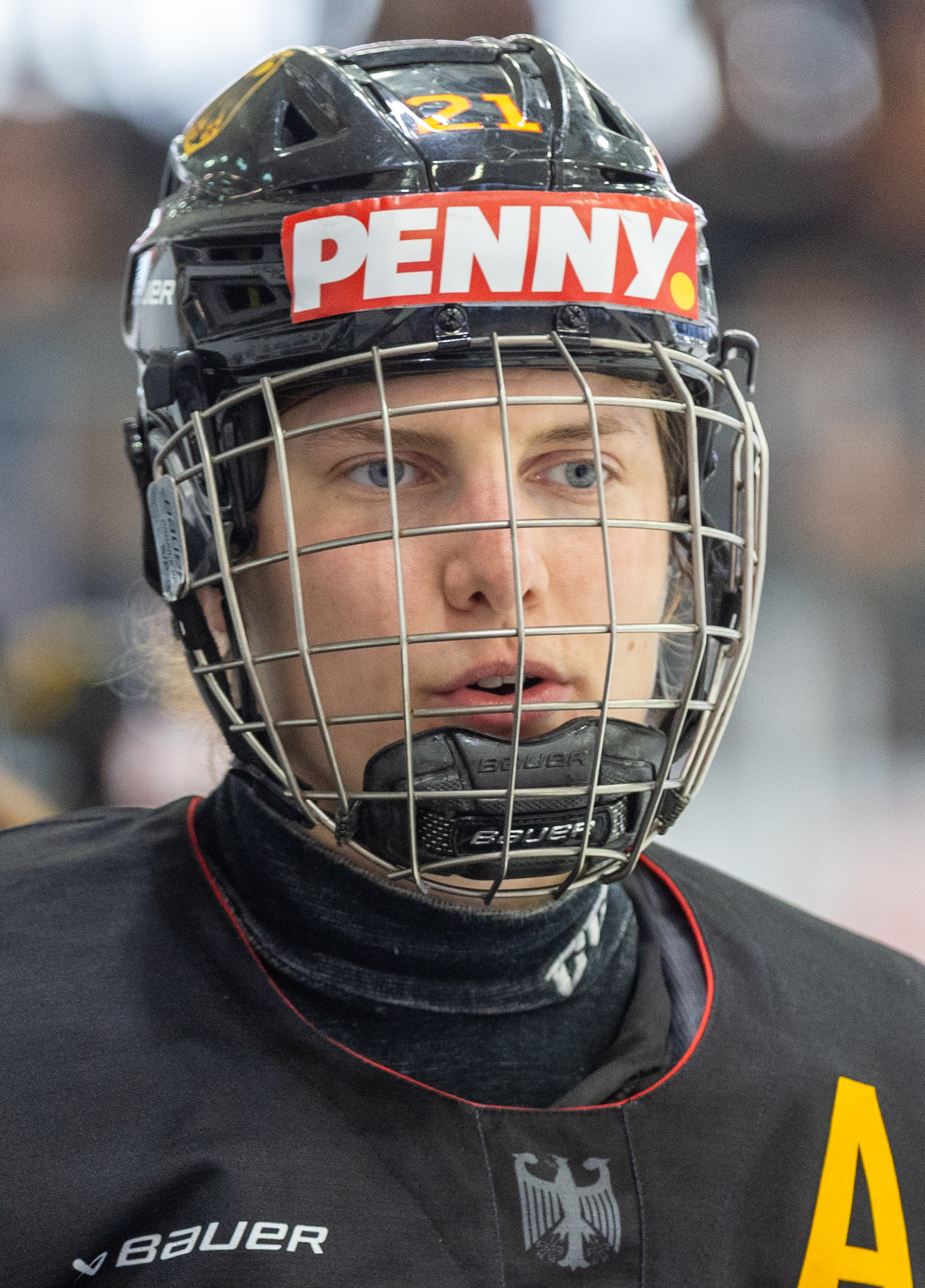
- Tabea Botthof, 2026
- Born: 1 June 2000 (age 26) Landshut, Germany
- Height: 1.75 m (5 ft 9 in)
- Weight: 73 kg (161 lb; 11 st 7 lb)
- Position: Defence
- Shoots: Right
- DFEL team Former teams: EKU Mannheim; ESC Planegg; Yale Bulldogs
- National team: Germany
- Playing career: 2016–present

Tabea Botthof (born 1 June 2000) is a German ice hockey player and member of the German national team. She played for the Yale Bulldogs women's ice hockey program in the ECAC Hockey conference of the NCAA Division I.

== International play ==
She represented Germany at the IIHF Women's World Championship tournaments in 2017, 2019, and 2021. As a junior player with the German national under-18 team, she participated in the IIHF U18 Women's World Championship Division I tournaments in 2015 and 2016, the Division I Group A tournament in 2017, and the Top Division Tournament in 2018. At the 2016 Winter Youth Olympics, Botthof represented Germany in the girls' individual skills challenge, where she qualified for the Grand Final and finished in eighth place.

=== International statistics ===
Year	Team	Event	Result	GP	G	A	Pts	PIM
2015	Germany U18	WW18 D1	4th	5	0	0	0	2
2016	Germany U18	WW18 D1	2nd	5	1	2	3	2
2017	Germany U18	WW18 D1A	1st	5	2	2	4	2
2017	Germany	WW	4th	6	0	0	0	0
2018	Germany U18	WW18	8th	5	0	2	2	2
2019	Germany	WW	7th	5	0	0	0	0
2021	Germany	WW	8th	6	0	0	0	2
2021	Germany	OGQ	DNQ	3	0	0	0	4
Junior totals				20	3	6	9	8
Senior totals				17	0	0	0	2
