= Speed skating at the 2016 Winter Youth Olympics – Girls' 1500 metres =

Girls' 1500 metres at the II Winter Youth Olympic Games
- Venue: Hamar Olympic Hall
- Date: 15 February
- Competitors: 26 from 17 nations
- Winning time: 2:03.53

Medalists
1st place, gold medalist(s)		Park Ji-woo	South Korea
2nd place, silver medalist(s)		Han Mei	China
3rd place, bronze medalist(s)		Noemi Bonazza	Italy

The girls' 1500 metres speed skating competition of the 2016 Winter Youth Olympics was held at Hamar Olympic Hall on 15 February 2016.

== Results ==
The races were held at 10:30.

Rank	Pair	Lane	Name	Country	Time	Time Behind
1st place, gold medalist(s)	11	i	Park Ji-woo	South Korea	2:03.53	
2nd place, silver medalist(s)	12	i	Han Mei	China	2:04.48	+0.95
3rd place, bronze medalist(s)	8	i	Noemi Bonazza	Italy	2:05.49	+1.96
4	10	o	Natálie Kerschbaummayr	Czech Republic	2:05.54	+2.01
5	13	i	Karolina Bosiek	Poland	2:06.24	+2.71
6	13	o	Chiara Cristelli	Italy	2:07.16	+3.63
7	7	o	Sofya Napolskikh	Russia	2:07.18	+3.65
8	8	o	Isabelle van Elst	Netherlands	2:08.26	+4.73
9	3	i	Karolina Gąsecka	Poland	2:09.02	+5.49
10	12	o	Elisa Dul	Netherlands	2:09.08	+5.55
11	11	o	Li Huawei	China	2:09.61	+6.08
12	7	i	Lea Scholz	Germany	2:10.13	+6.60
13	6	i	Viola Feichtner	Austria	2:10.44	+6.91
14	6	o	Elena Samkova	Russia	2:10.45	+6.92
15	10	i	Yuna Onodera	Japan	2:11.37	+7.84
16	1	i	Kim Min-sun	South Korea	2:11.76	+8.23
17	9	i	Yauheniya Varabyova	Belarus	2:12.25	+8.72
18	4	i	Camilla Evjevik	Norway	2:12.72	+9.19
19	9	o	Viktoria Schinnerl	Austria	2:13.40	+9.87
20	1	o	Moe Kumagai	Japan	2:14.34	+10.81
21	3	o	Mihaela Hogaş	Romania	2:14.61	+11.08
22	5	i	Erika Lindgren	Sweden	2:14.75	+11.22
23	5	o	Hanna Nifantava	Belarus	2:18.13	+14.60
24	2	o	Buyantogtokhyn Sumiyaa	Mongolia	2:18.42	+14.89
25	4	o	Jasmin Güntert	Switzerland	2:19.84	+16.31
26	2	i	Mariya Gromova	Kazakhstan	2:23.03	+19.50
