= Biathlon at the 2016 Winter Youth Olympics – Mixed relay =

Mixed relay at the II Winter Youth Olympic Games
- Venue: Birkebeineren Ski Stadium
- Date: 21 February
- Competitors: 72 from 18 nations
- Winning time: 1:18:35.6

Medalists
1st place, gold medalist(s)		Marit Øygard; Marthe Kråkstad Johansen; Fredrik Bucher-Johannessen; Sivert Bakken	Norway
2nd place, silver medalist(s)		Juliane Frühwirt; Franziska Pfnuer; Simon Groß; Danilo Riethmueller	Germany
3rd place, bronze medalist(s)		Samuela Comola; Irene Lardschneider; Cedric Christille; Patrick Braunhofer	Italy

The mixed relay biathlon competition at the 2016 Winter Youth Olympics was held on 21 February at the Birkebeineren Ski Stadium.

== Results ==
The race was started at 12:00.

Rank	Bib	Country	Time	Penalties (P+S)	Deficit
1st place, gold medalist(s)	4	Norway; Marit Øygard; Marthe Kråkstad Johansen; Fredrik Bucher-Johannessen; Sivert Bakken	1:18:35.6; 19:15.0; 18:42.2; 20:44.7; 19:53.7	0+6 0+5; 0+3 0+2; 0+0 0+2; 0+3 0+1; 0+0 0+0	—
2nd place, silver medalist(s)	1	Germany; Juliane Frühwirt; Franziska Pfnuer; Simon Groß; Danilo Riethmueller	1:18:43.2; 19:14.6; 19:18.3; 20:30.0; 19:40.3	0+5 0+4; 0+3 0+2; 0+0 0+0; 0+1 0+0; 0+1 0+2	+7.6
3rd place, bronze medalist(s)	9	Italy; Samuela Comola; Irene Lardschneider; Cedric Christille; Patrick Braunhofer	1:20:06.0; 19:17.4; 20:05.5; 20:52.7; 19:50.4	0+1 0+5; 0+0 0+0; 0+0 0+2; 0+1 0+2; 0+0 0+1	+1:30.4
4	2	France; Lou Jeanmonnot-Laurent; Gilonne Guigonnat; Pierre Monney; Emilien Claude	1:20:36.4; 19:11.6; 20:24.5; 20:56.0; 20:04.3	1+7 0+7; 0+1 0+1; 1+3 0+3; 0+3 0+0; 0+0 0+3	+2:00.8
5	5	Russia; Ekaterina Ponedelko; Anastasiia Khaliullina; Said Karimulla Khalili; Egor Tutmin	1:21:00.7; 19:33.8; 20:51.5; 20:20.1; 20:15.3	1+8 1+7; 0+0 0+2; 1+3 1+3; 0+3 0+1; 0+2 0+1	+2:25.1
6	6	Ukraine; Khrystyna Dmytrenko; Liubov Kypiachenkova; Yurii Sytnyk; Serhiy Telen	1:21:26.8; 19:07.2; 21:08.6; 20:44.8; 20:26.2	0+8 1+10; 0+3 0+1; 0+3 1+3; 0+1 0+3; 0+1 0+3	+2:51.2
7	13	United States; Chloe Levins; Amanda Kautzer; Vaclav Cervenka; Eli Nielsen	1:24:56.2; 19:18.5; 19:42.4; 22:54.3; 23:01.0	3+7 0+5; 0+0 0+1; 0+1 0+2; 2+3 0+1; 1+3 0+1	+6:20.6
8	10	Switzerland; Flavia Barmettler; Anja Fischer; Sebastian Stalder; Nico Salutt	1:25:15.9; 19:52.5; 21:48.8; 21:17.3; 22:17.3	2+7 1+7; 0+1 0+1; 0+0 0+3; 1+3 0+0; 1+3 1+3	+6:40.3
9	3	Czech Republic; Petra Suchá; Tereza Vinklárková; Vítězslav Hornig; Jakub Štvrtecký	1:25:20.2; 20:42.0; 21:05.6; 21:12.3; 22:20.3	1+6 3+10; 1+3 0+3; 0+0 1+3; 0+1 0+1; 0+2 2+3	+6:44.6
10	15	Slovakia; Veronika Haidelmeierová; Henrieta Horvátová; Matej Lepeň; Miroslav Pavlák	1:25:20.6; 20:46.2; 21:28.1; 21:50.8; 21:15.5	1+5 0+3; 0+0 0+0; 1+3 0+1; 0+2 0+2; 0+0 0+0	+6:45.0
11	14	Sweden; Moa Olsson; Sanna Sjödén; Emil Simonsson; Henning Sjokvist	1:25:37.8; 19:51.6; 18:59.7; 23:31.2; 23:15.3	0+3 5+8; 0+0 0+3; 0+2 0+0; 0+1 4+2; 0+0 1+3	+7:02.2
12	7	Belarus; Darya Iyeropes; Natallia Karnitskaya; Aliaksandr Matskevich; Kiryl Tsiuryn	1:27:08.3; 20:49.8; 22:06.3; 23:06.4; 21:05.8	1+10 4+11; 0+3 0+2; 1+3 1+3; 0+3 3+3; 0+1 0+3	+8:32.7
13	16	Bulgaria; Maria Zdravkova; Milena Todorova; Kristiyan Stoyanov; Petar Velchev	1:27:44.4; 21:25.1; 21:51.7; 20:34.2; 23:53.4	3+11 4+11; 0+3 2+3; 1+3 1+3; 0+2 0+2; 2+3 1+3	+9:08.8
14	8	Austria; Marion Berger; Lea Wörter; Markus Ortner; Dominic Unterweger	1:28:40.1; 21:18.3; 21:17.8; 23:30.1; 22:33.9	0+7 2+8; 0+1 0+1; 0+2 0+3; 0+2 2+3; 0+2 0+1	+10:04.5
15	12	Poland; Natalia Tomaszewska; Joanna Jakieła; Wojciech Filip; Przemysław Pancerz	1:29:32.5; 21:42.1; 23:35.1; 22:23.0; 21:52.3	1+11 4+10; 0+3 1+3; 0+2 3+3; 1+3 0+1; 0+3 0+3	+10:56.9
16	11	Canada; Tekarra Banser; Gillian Gowling; Leo Grandbois; Ben Churchill	1:29:40.2; 21:16.2; 25:30.5; 21:12.3; 21:41.2	4+6 0+8; 0+0 0+2; 4+3 0+2; 0+1 0+2; 0+2 0+2	+11:04.6
17	18	Estonia; Anneliis Viilukas; Hanna Moor; Robert Heldna; Mart Všivtsev	1:30:58.1; 25:26.9; 23:04.1; 21:09.5; 21:17.6	6+8 2+8; 4+3 2+2; 2+3 0+1; 0+2 0+3; 0+0 0+2	+12:22.5
	17	Finland; Jenni Keranen; Saana Lahdelma; Otto-Eemil Karvinen; Tuomas Harjula	DNF; 19:06.5; 20:38.5; 20:45.8	0+7 1+3; 0+2 0+0; 0+2 1+3; 0+1 0+0; 0+2	
