= Ice hockey at the 2016 Winter Youth Olympics – Girls' individual skills challenge =

Girls' individual skills challenge at the II Winter Youth Olympic Games
- Venue: Kristins Hall
- Date: February 13–14 (qualification); February 16
- Competitors: 16 from 16 nations
- Winning points: 16

Medalists
1st place, gold medalist(s)		Sena Takenaka	Japan
2nd place, silver medalist(s)		Anita Muraro	Italy
3rd place, bronze medalist(s)		Theresa Schafzahl	Austria

The girls' individual skills challenge at the 2016 Winter Youth Olympics was held between February 13 and 16, 2016 at Kristins Hall in Lillehammer, Norway. Individual skills challenge based on six skills, with total points to determine final placements.

== Qualification ==
The eight highest ranked will qualify (Q) to the Grand Final.

Rk	Name	Nation	Fastest Lap		Shooting Accuracy		Skating Agility		Fastest Shot		Passing Precision		Puck Control		Total Pts	Notes
Rk	Name	Nation	Pt	Rk	Pt	Rk	Pt	Rk	Pt	Rk	Pt	Rk	Pt	Rk	Total Pts	Notes
1	Theresa Schafzahl	Austria	3	3	3	4	5	1	2	6	4	2	1	14	18	Q
2	Sena Takenaka	Japan	2	5	5	1	2	7	4	2	3	4	1	10	17	Q
3	Madison Poole	Australia	5	1	2	5	2	6	1	3	2	6	4	2	16	Q
4	Millie Rose Sirum	Norway	2	6	1	15	2	8	5	1	2	8	3	4	15	Q
5	Eom Su-yeon	South Korea	4	2	3	3	4	2	2	7	1	12	1	11	15	Q
6	Tabea Botthof	Germany	3	4	2	7	3	3	2	5	1	15	3	3	14	Q
7	Martina Fedorová	Slovakia	2	8	1	14	1	9	2	8	1	9	5	1	12	Q
8	Anita Muraro	Italy	2	7	4	2	2	5	1	9	2	5	1	12	12	Q
9	Chinouk Van Calster	Belgium	1	9	1	12	1	13	1	11	5	1	2	5	11	
10	Verity Lewis	Great Britain	1	15	2	6	3	4	1	10	3	3	1	8	11	
11	Kiia Nousiainen	Finland	1	10	1	13	1	10	3	4	0	16	2	7	8	
12	Maree Dijkema	Netherlands	1	11	1	9	1	12	3	3	1	11	0	16	7	
13	Diana Iuga	Romania	1	13	1	11	1	16	1	16	1	14	2	6	7	
14	Daria Maksimchuk	Belarus	1	12	1	10	1	11	1	14	2	7	1	13	7	
15	Katarzyna Wybiral	Poland	1	14	2	8	1	14	1	12	1	10	1	9	7	
16	Iara Haiek	Argentina	1	16	1	16	1	15	1	15	1	13	1	15	6	

== Grand Final ==
The players are ranked by total points. If still tied, by number of better skill rankings (number of ranks 1; if the same, number of ranks 2; if the same, number of ranks 3, etc.). If still tied, by overall seeding for the phase.

Rk	Name	Nation	Overall seeding	Fastest Lap		Shooting Accuracy		Skating Agility		Fastest Shot		Passing Precision		Puck Control		Total Pts
Rk	Name	Nation	Overall seeding	Pt	Rk	Pt	Rk	Pt	Rk	Pt	Rk	Pt	Rk	Pt	Rk	Total Pts
1st place, gold medalist(s)	Sena Takenaka	Japan	2	2	3	1	5	3	2	3	2	3	2	4	1	16
2nd place, silver medalist(s)	Anita Muraro	Italy	5	3	2	4	1	4	1	1	6	1	7	1	6	14
3rd place, bronze medalist(s)	Theresa Schafzahl	Austria	6	2	4	1	6	2	3	2	3	4	1	2	3	13
4	Millie Rose Sirum	Norway	1	1	5	3	2	1	7	4	1	2	3	1	7	12
5	Madison Poole	Australia	3	4	1	2	4	1	5	1	8	1	5	3	2	12
6	Eom Su-yeon	South Korea	7	1	6	2	3	2	4	1	5	1	8	2	4	9
7	Martina Fedorová	Slovakia	10	1	8	1	7	1	6	1	7	2	4	1	5	7
8	Tabea Botthof	Germany	4	1	7	1	8	1	8	2	4	1	6	1	8	7
