= Luge at the 2016 Winter Youth Olympics – Girls' singles =

Girls' singles at the II Winter Youth Olympic Games
- Venue: Lillehammer Olympic Bobsleigh and Luge Track
- Dates: 15 February
- Competitors: 22 from 20 nations
- Winning time: 1:35.309

Medalists
1st place, gold medalist(s)		Brooke Apshkrum	Canada
2nd place, silver medalist(s)		Jessica Tiebel	Germany
3rd place, bronze medalist(s)		Madeleine Egle	Austria

The girls' singles luge at the 2016 Winter Youth Olympics took place on 15 February at the Lillehammer Olympic Bobsleigh and Luge Track.

== Results ==
Rank	Bib	Athlete	Country	Run 1	Rank 1	Run 2	Rank 2	Total	Behind
1st place, gold medalist(s)	14	Brooke Apshkrum	Canada	53.165	2	52.861	1	1:46.026	–
2nd place, silver medalist(s)	3	Jessica Tiebel	Germany	53.106	1	52.991	2	1:46.097	+0.071
3rd place, bronze medalist(s)	2	Madeleine Egle	Austria	53.165	2	53.102	4	1:46.267	+0.241
4	6	Tatyana Tsvetova	Russia	53.324	5	53.282	5	1:46.606	+0.580
5	7	Olesya Mikhaylenko	Russia	53.315	4	53.299	6	1:46.614	+0.588
6	12	Vilde Tangnes	Norway	53.545	7	53.339	7	1:46.884	+0.858
7	18	Verónica María Ravenna	Argentina	53.511	6	53.405	8	1:46.916	+0.890
8	1	Tina Müller	Germany	53.851	11	53.091	3	1:46.942	+0.916
9	9	Anda Upīte	Latvia	53.821	10	53.601	9	1:47.422	+1.396
10	22	Olena Smaha	Ukraine	53.780	9	53.712	10	1:47.492	+1.466
11	5	Marion Oberhofer	Italy	53.724	8	53.830	12	1:47.554	+1.528
12	10	Mihaela Manolescu	Romania	53.950	13	53.777	11	1:47.727	+1.701
13	17	Michaela Maršíková	Czech Republic	53.899	12	53.894	13	1:47.793	+1.767
14	18	Katarína Šimoňáková	Slovakia	54.127	14	54.072	15	1:48.199	+2.173
15	16	Nadia Chodorek	Poland	54.262	15	54.405	16	1:48.667	+2.641
16	11	Emili Yordanova	Bulgaria	55.190	17	55.200	17	1:50.390	+4.364
17	21	Margot Boch	France	57.674	20	53.913	13	1:51.587	+5.561
18	13	Anastassiya Bogacheva	Kazakhstan	55.953	18	55.685	18	1:51.638	+5.612
19	15	Tove Kohala	Sweden	54.945	16	57.326	20	1:52.271	+6.245
20	20	Beth Slade	Australia	56.488	19	57.008	19	1:53.496	+7.470
21	19	Göksu Özkaya	Turkey	58.244	21	57.921	21	1:56.165	+10.139
	4	Ashley Farquharson	United States	DNF					
