= Speed skating at the 2016 Winter Youth Olympics – Girls' 500 metres =

Girls' 500 metres at the II Winter Youth Olympic Games
- Venue: Hamar Olympic Hall
- Date: 13 February
- Competitors: 26 from 16 nations
- Winning time: 78.66

Medalists
1st place, gold medalist(s)		Kim Min-sun	South Korea
2nd place, silver medalist(s)		Han Mei	China
3rd place, bronze medalist(s)		Li Huawei	China

The girls' 500 metres speed skating competition of the 2016 Winter Youth Olympics was held at Hamar Olympic Hall on 13 February 2016.

== Results ==
The races were held at 10:30.

Rank	Name	Country	Pair	Lane	Race 1	Rank	Pair	Lane	Race 2	Rank	Total	Time Behind
1st place, gold medalist(s)	Kim Min-sun	South Korea	13	i	39.30	1	13	o	39.36	1	78.66	
2nd place, silver medalist(s)	Han Mei	China	12	o	39.78	2	13	i	39.66	2	79.44	+0.78
3rd place, bronze medalist(s)	Li Huawei	China	11	i	39.97	4	12	o	39.77	3	79.75	+1.09
4	Park Ji-woo	South Korea	10	o	40.33	4	12	i	40.37	4	80.71	+2.05
5	Isabelle van Elst	Netherlands	13	o	40.52	5	11	i	40.74	5	81.27	+2.61
6	Noemi Bonazza	Italy	9	i	40.72	7	10	o	40.76	6	81.48	+2.82
7	Karolina Bosiek	Poland	6	i	40.78	8	9	o	40.85	7	81.63	+2.97
8	Moe Kumagai	Japan	12	i	40.71	6	11	o	41.00	9	81.71	+3.05
9	Elisa Dul	Netherlands	10	i	41.05	10	7	o	40.90	8	81.96	+3.30
10	Chiara Cristelli	Italy	8	i	40.89	9	8	o	41.16	10	82.05	+3.39
11	Yuna Onodera	Japan	11	o	41.58	12	10	i	41.70	13	83.28	+4.62
12	Yauheniya Varabyova	Belarus	7	i	41.530	11	6	o	41.810	14	83.340	+4.68
13	Elena Samkova	Russia	6	o	41.748	13	9	i	41.597	11	83.345	+4.68
14	Sofya Napolskikh	Russia	9	o	41.81	14	8	i	41.68	12	83.49	+4.83
15	Lea Scholz	Germany	8	o	41.84	15	7	i	41.92	16	83.77	+5.11
16	Hanna Nifantava	Belarus	5	o	42.42	18	5	i	41.84	15	84.26	+5.60
17	Mihaela Hogaş	Romania	7	o	42.27	16	6	i	42.11	17	84.38	+5.72
18	Karolina Gąsecka	Poland	5	i	42.38	17	5	o	42.39	18	84.78	+6.12
19	Pia-Leonie Kirsakal	Germany	4	i	42.64	19	4	o	42.66	20	85.30	+6.64
20	Viktoria Schinnerl	Austria	3	o	42.87	20	4	i	42.44	19	85.32	+6.66
21	Buyantogtokhyn Sumiyaa	Mongolia	1	i	43.381	23	2	o	42.914	21	86.295	+7.63
22	Erika Lindgren	Sweden	3	i	43.322	22	3	o	42.974	22	86.296	+7.63
23	Camilla Evjevik	Norway	4	o	43.20	21	3	i	43.74	23	86.95	+8.29
24	Viola Feichtner	Austria	1	o	43.88	25	2	i	44.00	24	87.88	+9.22
25	Mariya Gromova	Kazakhstan	2	i	43.72	24	1	o	44.24	25	87.96	+9.30
	Jasmin Güntert	Switzerland	2	o	DQ							
