= Netherlands at the 2016 Winter Youth Olympics =

- IOC code: NED
- NOC: NOC*NSF
- Website: www.nocnsf.nl

in Lillehammer
- Competitors: 13 in 6 sports
- Medals Ranked 27th: Gold 0 Silver 0 Bronze 1 Total 1

Winter Youth Olympics appearances
- 2012; 2016; 2020; 2024

Netherlands competed at the 2016 Winter Youth Olympics in Lillehammer, Norway from 12 to 21 February 2016.

== Medalists ==
Medal	Name	Sport	Event	Date
Bronze	Daan Baks	Speed skating	Boys' 1500 m	15 February

=== Medalists in mixed NOCs events ===
Medal	Name	Sport	Event	Date
Silver	Elisa Dul	Speed skating	Mixed team sprint	17 February
Silver	Tjerk De Boer	Short track	Mixed team relay	20 February

== Alpine skiing ==
Boys

Athlete	Event	Run 1		Run 2		Total	
Athlete	Event	Time	Rank	Time	Rank	Time	Rank
Djordy Schaaf	Slalom	52.93	25	51.70	18	1:44.63	22
Djordy Schaaf	Giant slalom	1:21.70	23	1:20.65	17	2:42.35	19
Djordy Schaaf	Super-G	—N/a				1:15.49	37
Djordy Schaaf	Combined	1:15.36	34	did not finish			

Girls

Athlete	Event	Run 1		Run 2		Total	
Athlete	Event	Time	Rank	Time	Rank	Time	Rank
Claire Tan	Slalom	59.10	20	54.71	20	1:53.81	18
Claire Tan	Giant slalom	1:22.85	17	1:19.57	19	2:42.42	16
Claire Tan	Super-G	—N/a				1:18.48	29
Claire Tan	Combined	DNF		did not advance			

== Ice hockey ==
Athlete	Event	Qualification		Final	
Athlete	Event	Points	Rank	Points	Rank
Ties Van Soest	Boys' individual skills challenge	8	12	did not advance	
Maree Dijkema	Girls' individual skills challenge	7	12	did not advance	

== Short track speed skating ==
Boys

Athlete	Event	Quarterfinal		Semifinal		Final	
Athlete	Event	Time	Rank	Time	Rank	Time	Rank
Tjerk De Boer	500 m	No Time	4 SC/D	43.830	1 FC	44.695	10
Tjerk De Boer	1000 m	1:32.341	3 SC/D	1:40.797	1 FC	1:34.836	8

Girls

Athlete	Event	Quarterfinal		Semifinal		Final	
Athlete	Event	Time	Rank	Time	Rank	Time	Rank
Gioya Lancee	500 m	46.247	3 SC/D	46.813	2 FC	46.324	10
Gioya Lancee	1000 m	1:41.119	1 SA/B	1:37.857	4 FB	1:42.289	6

Mixed team relay

Athlete	Event	Semifinal		Final	
Athlete	Event	Time	Rank	Time	Rank
Team C Petra Jaszapati (HUN); Julia Moore (AUS); Tjerk De Boer (NED); Kiichi Shigehiro (JPN)	Mixed team relay	4:15.332	1 FA	4:14.495	2nd place, silver medalist(s)
Team H Shione Kaminaga (JPN); Gioya Lancee (NED); Moritz Kreuseler (GER); Ma Wei (CHN)	Mixed team relay	4:27.607	3 FB	4:22.198	4

Qualification Legend: FA=Final A (medal); FB=Final B (non-medal); FC=Final C (non-medal); FD=Final D (non-medal); SA/B=Semifinals A/B; SC/D=Semifinals C/D; ADV=Advanced to Next Round; PEN=Penalized

== Skeleton ==
Athlete	Event	Run 1		Run 2		Total	
Athlete	Event	Time	Rank	Time	Rank	Time	Rank
Bram Zeegers	Boys	56.54	18	56.16	16	1:52.70	18
Noelle Vennemann	Girls	57.47	15	56.81	11	1:54.28	14

== Snowboarding ==
Slopestyle

Athlete	Event	Final			
Athlete	Event	Run 1	Run 2	Best	Rank
Erik Bastiaansen	Boys' slopestyle	31.50	31.00	31.50	19

== Speed skating ==
Boys

Athlete	Event	Race 1		Race 2		Final	
Athlete	Event	Time	Rank	Time	Rank	Time	Rank
Daan Baks	500 m	37.44	10	37.14	8	74.59	10
Daan Baks	1500 m	—N/a				1:53.29	3rd place, bronze medalist(s)
Daan Baks	Mass start	—N/a				5:54.35	13
Louis Hollaar	500 m	37.41	9	37.73	14	75.14	13
Louis Hollaar	1500 m	—N/a				1:55.45	7
Louis Hollaar	Mass start	—N/a				5:53.37	9

Girls

Athlete	Event	Race 1		Race 2		Final	
Athlete	Event	Time	Rank	Time	Rank	Time	Rank
Elisa Dul	500 m	41.05	10	40.90	8	81.96	9
Elisa Dul	1500 m	—N/a				2:09.08	10
Elisa Dul	Mass start	—N/a				5 pts	4
Isabelle van Elst	500 m	40.52	5	40.74	5	81.27	5
Isabelle van Elst	1500 m	—N/a				2:08.26	8
Isabelle van Elst	Mass start	—N/a				5:57.20	14

Mixed team sprint

Athletes	Event	Final	
Athletes	Event	Time	Rank
Team 5 Erika Lindgren (SWE); Isabelle van Elst (NED); Yevgeny Bolgov (BLR); Samuli Suomalainen (FIN)	Mixed team sprint	2:16.73	11
Team 7 Karolina Bosiek (POL); Viktoria Schinnerl (AUT); Louis Hollaar (NED); Jan Swiatek (POL)	Mixed team sprint	DNF	
Team 9 Elisa Dul (NED); Karolina Gasecka (POL); Austin Kleba (USA); Anvar Mukhamadeyev (KAZ)	Mixed team sprint	1:58.80	2nd place, silver medalist(s)
Team 11; Anna Nifantava (BLR); Yuna Onodera (JPN); Daan Baks (NED); Francesco Betti (ITA)	Mixed team sprint	2:00.13	9

== See also ==
- Netherlands at the 2016 Summer Olympics
