= Kazakhstan at the 2016 Winter Youth Olympics =

- IOC code: KAZ
- NOC: Kazakhstan Olympic Committee

in Lillehammer
- Competitors: 17 in 9 sports
- Medals Ranked 26th: Gold 0 Silver 0 Bronze 2 Total 2

Winter Youth Olympics appearances (overview)
- 2012; 2016; 2020; 2024

Kazakhstan competed at the 2016 Winter Youth Olympics in Lillehammer, Norway from 12 to 21 February 2016.

== Medalists ==
Medal	Name	Sport	Event	Date
Bronze	Arina Pantova	Biathlon	Girls' sprint	14 February
Bronze	Elizabet Tursynbayeva	Figure skating	Girls' singles	16 February

=== Medalists in mixed NOCs events ===
Medal	Name	Sport	Event	Date
Silver	Anvar Mukhamadeyev	Speed skating	Mixed team sprint	17 February
Bronze	Anita Nagay	Short track	Mixed team relay	20 February

== Alpine skiing ==
Girls

Athlete	Event	Run 1		Run 2		Total	
Athlete	Event	Time	Rank	Time	Rank	Time	Rank
Yekaterina Karpova	Slalom	DNF		did not advance			
Yekaterina Karpova	Giant slalom	1:27.56	29	1:23.94	25	2:51.50	25
Yekaterina Karpova	Super-G	—N/a				1:20.07	31
Yekaterina Karpova	Combined	1:21.76	29	54.43	23	2:16.19	22

== Biathlon ==
Boys

Athlete	Event	Time	Misses	Rank
Ivan Darin	Sprint	21:06.6	3	26
Ivan Darin	Pursuit	35:16.3	10	39

Girls

Athlete	Event	Time	Misses	Rank
Yevgeniya Krassikova	Sprint	19:37.8	2	15
Yevgeniya Krassikova	Pursuit	26:46.3	3	10
Arina Pantova	Sprint	18:40.6	2	3rd place, bronze medalist(s)
Arina Pantova	Pursuit	26:20.8	6	7

Mixed

Athletes	Event	Time	Misses	Rank
Arina Pantova; Ivan Darin	Single mixed relay	45:25.2	9+18	17

== Cross-country skiing ==
Boys

Athlete	Event	Qualification		Quarterfinal		Semifinal		Final	
Athlete	Event	Time	Rank	Time	Rank	Time	Rank	Time	Rank
Ivan Lyuft	10 km freestyle	—N/a						25:20.8	11
Ivan Lyuft	Classical sprint	3:03.63	8 Q	3:03.10	2 Q	2:58.07	4	did not advance	
Ivan Lyuft	Cross-country cross	3:12.36	10 Q	—N/a		3:06.96	2 Q	3:08.99	8

Girls

Athlete	Event	Qualification		Quarterfinal		Semifinal		Final	
Athlete	Event	Time	Rank	Time	Rank	Time	Rank	Time	Rank
Anzhelika Tarassova	5 km freestyle	—N/a						14:07.02	14
Anzhelika Tarassova	Classical sprint	3:39.51	15 Q	3:37.20	4	did not advance			
Anzhelika Tarassova	Cross-country cross	3:47.95	16 Q	—N/a		3:48.55	7	did not advance	

== Figure skating ==
Singles

Athlete	Event	SP		FS		Total	
Athlete	Event	Points	Rank	Points	Rank	Points	Rank
Elizabet Tursynbayeva	Girls' singles	59.11	2	108.77	3	167.88	3rd place, bronze medalist(s)

== Freestyle skiing ==
Ski cross

Athlete	Event	Qualification		Group heats		Semifinal	Final
Athlete	Event	Time	Rank	Points	Rank	Position	Position
Olzhas Kairat	Boys' ski cross	49.11	18	did not advance			
Aizhan Sapiyanova	Girls' ski cross	50.37	15	7	14	did not advance	

== Luge ==
Individual sleds

Athlete	Event	Run 1		Run 2		Total	
Athlete	Event	Time	Rank	Time	Rank	Time	Rank
Anastassiya Bogacheva	Girls	55.953	18	55.685	18	1:51.638	18
Denis Tatyanchenko; Roman Yefremov	Doubles	54.235	9	54.725	13	1:48.960	11

Mixed team relay

Athlete	Event	Girls		Boys		Doubles		Total	
Athlete	Event	Time	Rank	Time	Rank	Time	Rank	Time	Rank
Anastassiya Bogacheva (KAZ); Lucas Gebauer-Barrett (GBR); Roman Yefremov (KAZ); Denis Tatyanchenko (KAZ)	Team relay	59.432	12	59.536	11	1:02.099	11	3:01.067	12

== Ski jumping ==
Athlete	Event	First round			Final			Total	
Athlete	Event	Distance	Points	Rank	Distance	Points	Rank	Points	Rank
Sergey Tkachenko	Boys' normal hill	85.0	95.3	12	82.5	91.0	14	186.3	14

== Short track speed skating ==
Boys

Athlete	Event	Quarterfinal		Semifinal		Final	
Athlete	Event	Time	Rank	Time	Rank	Time	Rank
Yerkebulan Shamukhanov	500 m	44.170	3 SC/D	No Time	4 FD	44.916	12
Yerkebulan Shamukhanov	1000 m	No Time	4 SC/D	1:41.000	2 FC	1:35.420	9

Girls

Athlete	Event	Quarterfinal		Semifinal		Final	
Athlete	Event	Time	Rank	Time	Rank	Time	Rank
Anita Nagay	500 m	48.463	4 SC/D	1:05.766	2 FC	48.103	11
Anita Nagay	1000 m	1:41.290	2 SA/B	1:40.894	4 FB	1:42.693	9

Mixed team relay

Athlete	Event	Semifinal		Final	
Athlete	Event	Time	Rank	Time	Rank
Team D Gong Li (CHN); Lee Su-youn (KOR); Shaoang Liu (HUN); Yerkebulan Shamukhanov (KAZ)	Mixed team relay	PEN		did not advance	
Team F Katrin Manoilova (BUL); Anita Nagay (KAZ); Karlis Kruzbergs (LAT); Kazuki Yoshinaga (JPN)	Mixed team relay	4:15.669	1 FA	4:17.181	3rd place, bronze medalist(s)

Qualification Legend: FA=Final A (medal); FB=Final B (non-medal); FC=Final C (non-medal); FD=Final D (non-medal); SA/B=Semifinals A/B; SC/D=Semifinals C/D; ADV=Advanced to Next Round; PEN=Penalized

== Speed skating ==
Boys

Athlete	Event	Race 1		Race 2		Final	
Athlete	Event	Time	Rank	Time	Rank	Time	Rank
Anvar Mukhamadeyev	500 m	38.72	24	38.50	22	77.229	23
Anvar Mukhamadeyev	1500 m	—N/a				1:59.51	22
Anvar Mukhamadeyev	Mass start	—N/a				5:58.17	21

Girls

Athlete	Event	Race 1		Race 2		Final	
Athlete	Event	Time	Rank	Time	Rank	Time	Rank
Mariya Gromova	500 m	43.72	24	44.24	25	87.96	25
Mariya Gromova	1500 m	—N/a				2:23.03	26
Mariya Gromova	Mass start	—N/a				6:03.40	20

Mixed team sprint

Athletes	Event	Final	
Athletes	Event	Time	Rank
Team 2 Mariya Gromova (KAZ); Han Mei (CHN); Mathias Hauer (AUT); Victor Rudenko (BLR)	Mixed team sprint	2:00.79	10
Team 9 Elisa Dul (NED); Karolina Gasecka (POL); Austin Kleba (USA); Anvar Mukhamadeyev (KAZ)	Mixed team sprint	1:58.80	2nd place, silver medalist(s)

== See also ==
- Kazakhstan at the 2016 Summer Olympics
