= Speed skating at the 2016 Winter Youth Olympics – Girls' mass start =

Girls' mass start at the II Winter Youth Olympic Games
- Venue: Hamar Olympic Hall
- Date: 19 February
- Competitors: 25 from 17 nations
- Winning points: 30

Medalists
1st place, gold medalist(s)		Park Ji-woo	South Korea
2nd place, silver medalist(s)		Han Mei	China
3rd place, bronze medalist(s)		Kim Min-sun	South Korea

The girls' mass start speed skating competition of the 2016 Winter Youth Olympics was held at Hamar Olympic Hall on 19 February 2016.

== Results ==
The races were held at 10:30.

Rank	Name	Country	Laps	Time	Points
1st place, gold medalist(s)	Park Ji-woo	South Korea	10		30
2nd place, silver medalist(s)	Han Mei	China	10		20
3rd place, bronze medalist(s)	Kim Min-sun	South Korea	10		10
4	Elisa Dul	Netherlands	10		5
5	Viktoria Schinnerl	Austria	10		3
6	Yauheniya Varabyova	Belarus	10		1
7	Natálie Kerschbaummayr	Czech Republic	10	5:54.50	0
8	Noemi Bonazza	Italy	10	5:54.82	0
9	Chiara Cristelli	Italy	10	5:55.36	0
10	Erika Lindgren	Sweden	10	5:56.13	0
11	Yuna Onodera	Japan	10	5:56.41	0
12	Karolina Bosiek	Poland	10	5:56.44	0
13	Jasmin Güntert	Switzerland	10	5:56.68	0
14	Isabelle van Elst	Netherlands	10	5:57.20	0
15	Viola Feichtner	Austria	10	5:57.45	0
16	Sofya Napolskikh	Russia	10	5:57.51	0
17	Karolina Gąsecka	Poland	10	5:58.32	0
18	Elena Samkova	Russia	10	5:58.43	0
19	Camilla Evjevik	Norway	10	5:58.67	0
20	Mariya Gromova	Kazakhstan	10	6:03.40	0
21	Buyantogtokhyn Sumiyaa	Mongolia	10	6:05.11	0
22	Li Huawei	China	10	6:07.09	0
23	Lea Scholz	Germany	9	5:53.66	0
24	Mihaela Hogaş	Romania	9	5:59.72	0
	Hanna Nifantava	Belarus	DSQ		
