= Poland at the 2016 Winter Youth Olympics =

- IOC code: POL
- NOC: Polish Olympic Committee
- Website: www.pkol.pl

in Lillehammer
- Competitors: 20 in 8 sports
- Medals: Gold 0 Silver 0 Bronze 0 Total 0

Winter Youth Olympics appearances
- 2012; 2016; 2020; 2024

Poland competed at the 2016 Winter Youth Olympics in Lillehammer, Norway from 12 to 21 February 2016. The Polish Olympic Committee revealed the team on 18 January 2016.

== Medalists in mixed NOCs events ==
Medal	Name	Sport	Event	Date
Silver	Karolina Gąsecka	Speed skating	Mixed team sprint	17 February

== Alpine skiing ==
Boys

Athlete	Event	Run 1		Run 2		Total	
Athlete	Event	Time	Rank	Time	Rank	Time	Rank
Szymon Bębenek	Slalom	51.64	14	51.32	14	1:42.96	13
Szymon Bębenek	Giant slalom	1:20.32	15	1:20.20	15	2:40.52	13
Szymon Bębenek	Super-G	—				1:12.24	13
Szymon Bębenek	Combined	1:13.32	15	41.97	10	1:55.29	11

Girls

Athlete	Event	Run 1		Run 2		Total	
Athlete	Event	Time	Rank	Time	Rank	Time	Rank
Daria Krajewska	Slalom	DNF		did not advance			
Daria Krajewska	Giant slalom	DNF		did not advance			
Daria Krajewska	Super-G	—				1:14.44	8
Daria Krajewska	Combined	DNF		Did not advance		DNF	

== Biathlon ==
Boys

Athlete	Event	Time	Misses	Rank
Wojciech Filip	Sprint	21:54.7	1+2	37
Wojciech Filip	Pursuit	35:05.1	1+1+4+2	38
Przemysław Pancerz	Sprint	21:15.6	1+3	27
Przemysław Pancerz	Pursuit	31:31.1	0+1+0+2	15

Girls

Athlete	Event	Time	Misses	Rank
Joanna Jakiela	Sprint	20:52.7	2+3	31
Joanna Jakiela	Pursuit	29:38.8	1+1+4+1	30
Natalia Tomaszewska	Sprint	22:41.9	4+3	46
Natalia Tomaszewska	Pursuit	32:47.3	2+2+2+1	41

Mixed

Athletes	Event	Time	Misses	Rank
Joanna Jakiela; Przemysław Pancerz	Single mixed relay	46:12.3	6+17	21
Natalia Tomaszewska; Joanna Jakiela; Wojciech Filip; Przemysław Pancerz	Mixed relay	1:29:32.5	5+21	15

== Cross-country skiing ==
Boys

Athlete	Event	Qualification		Quarterfinal		Semifinal		Final	
Athlete	Event	Time	Rank	Time	Rank	Time	Rank	Time	Rank
Mateusz Haratyk	10 km freestyle	—						25:45.3	20
Mateusz Haratyk	Classical sprint	3:08.99	21 Q	3:09.45	5	did not advance			
Mateusz Haratyk	Cross-country cross	3:17.05	24 Q	—		3:10.38	5 q	3:20.90	10

Girls

Athlete	Event	Qualification		Quarterfinal		Semifinal		Final	
Athlete	Event	Time	Rank	Time	Rank	Time	Rank	Time	Rank
Klaudia Kołodziej	5 km freestyle	—						15:11.3	29
Klaudia Kołodziej	Classical sprint	3:45.95	27 Q	3:39.18	6	did not advance			
Klaudia Kołodziej	Cross-country cross	3:56.29	26 Q	—		3:48.39	8	did not advance	

== Ice hockey ==
Athlete	Event	Qualification		Final	
Athlete	Event	Points	Rank	Points	Rank
Katarzyna Wybiral	Girls' individual skills challenge	7	15	did not advance	

== Luge ==
Boys

Athlete	Event	Final			
Athlete	Event	Run 1	Run 2	Total	Rank
Kacper Tarnawski	Boys' singles	58.299	49.746	1:48.045	20
Artur Zubel; Daniel Rola	Doubles	54.395	54.147	1:48.542	10

Girls

Athlete	Event	Final			
Athlete	Event	Run 1	Run 2	Total	Rank
Nadia Chodorek	Girls' singles	54.262	54.405	1:48.667	15

Team

Athlete	Event	Final				
Athlete	Event	Boys'	Girls'	Doubles	Total	Rank
Artur Zubel; Daniel Rola; Nadia Chodorek; Kacper Tarnawski	Mixed Team Relay	59:415	59.302	1:00.041	2:58.758	11

== Nordic combined ==
Individual

Athlete	Event	Ski jumping				Cross-country	
Athlete	Event	Distance	Points	Rank	Deficit	Time	Rank
Paweł Twardosz	Normal hill/5 km	92.0	115.4	7	1:06	14:24.4	6

Nordic mixed team

Athlete	Event	Ski jumping			Cross-country	
Athlete	Event	Points	Rank	Deficit	Time	Rank
Kinga Rajda; Paweł Twardosz; Dawid Jarząbek; Klaudia Kolodziej; Mateusz Haratyk	Nordic mixed team	305.2	9	1:34	28:29.1	9

== Ski jumping ==
Individual

Athlete	Event	First round			Final			Total	
Athlete	Event	Distance	Points	Rank	Distance	Points	Rank	Points	Rank
Dawid Jarząbek	Boys' normal hill	83.0	94.6	13	83.0	94.1	11	188.7	12
Kinga Rajda	Girls' normal hill	83.5	90.3	8	84.5	91.4	7	181.7	7

Team

Athlete	Event	First round		Final		Total	
Athlete	Event	Points	Rank	Points	Rank	Points	Rank
Kinga Rajda; Paweł Twardosz; Dawid Jarząbek	Team competition	282.9	9	291.5	7	574.4	9

== Speed skating ==
Boys

Athlete	Event	Race 1		Race 2		Final	
Athlete	Event	Time	Rank	Time	Rank	Time	Rank
Gaweł Oficjalski	500 m	37.26	7	37.22	10	74.49	9
Gaweł Oficjalski	1500 m	—				1:57.31	17
Gaweł Oficjalski	Mass start	—				5:54.51	14
Jan Świątek	500 m	38.712	22	38.49	21	77.21	21
Jan Świątek	1500 m	—				1:57.73	20
Jan Świątek	Mass start	—				5:54.91	16

Girls

Athlete	Event	Race 1		Race 2		Final	
Athlete	Event	Time	Rank	Time	Rank	Time	Rank
Karolina Bosiek	500 m	40.78	8	40.85	7	81.63	7
Karolina Bosiek	1500 m	—				2:06.24	5
Karolina Bosiek	Mass start	—				5:56.44	12
Karolina Gąsecka	500 m	42.38	17	42.39	18	84.78	18
Karolina Gąsecka	1500 m	—				2:09.02	9
Karolina Gąsecka	Mass start	—				5:58.32	17

Mixed team sprint

Athletes	Event	Final	
Athletes	Event	Time	Rank
Team 4 Camilla Evjevik (NOR); Park Ji-woo (KOR); Jonas Kristensen (NOR); Gaweł Oficjalski (POL)	Mixed team sprint	1:59.93	8
Team 7 Karolina Bosiek (POL); Viktoria Schinnerl (AUT); Louis Hollaar (NED); Jan Świątek (POL)	Mixed team sprint	DNF	
Team 9 Elisa Dul (NED); Karolina Gąsecka (POL); Austin Kleba (USA); Anvar Mukhamadeyev (KAZ)	Mixed team sprint	1:58.80	2nd place, silver medalist(s)

== See also ==
- Poland at the 2016 Summer Olympics
