= Short-track speed skating at the 2016 Winter Youth Olympics – Boys' 1000 metres =

Boys' 1000 metres at the II Winter Youth Olympic Games
- Venue: Gjøvik Olympic Cavern Hall
- Dates: 14 February
- Competitors: 16 from 13 nations
- Winning time: 1:28.022

Medalists
1st place, gold medalist(s)		Hwang Dae-heon	South Korea
2nd place, silver medalist(s)		Ma Wei	China
3rd place, bronze medalist(s)		Shaoang Liu	Hungary

The boys' 1000 metres in short track speed skating at the 2016 Winter Youth Olympics was held on 14 February at the Gjøvik Olympic Cavern Hall.

== Results ==
QAB – qualified for the semifinals A/B
QCD – qualified for the semifinals C/D
PEN – penalty
ADA – advanced

=== Quarterfinals ===
Rank	Heat	Name	Country	Time	Notes
1	1	Quentin Fercoq	France	1:29.474	QAB
2	1	Ma Wei	China	1:29.597	QAB
3	1	Aaron Heo	United States	1:31.071	QCD
4	1	Kārlis Krūzbergs	Latvia	1:33.621	QCD
1	2	Hwang Dae-heon	South Korea	1:32.893	QAB
2	2	Kazuki Yoshinaga	Japan	1:33.006	QAB
3	2	Moritz Kreuseler	Germany	1:36.354	QCD
4	2	Martinius Elvebakken	Norway	1:39.565	QCD
1	3	Shaoang Liu	Hungary	1:31.307	QAB
2	3	Hong Kyung-hwan	South Korea	1:31.417	QAB
3	3	Tjerk de Boer	Netherlands	1:32.341	QCD
4	3	Yerkebulan Shamukhanov	Kazakhstan	DNF	QCD
1	4	Kiichi Shigehiro	Japan	1:33.688	QAB
2	4	András Sziklási	Hungary	1:34.256	QAB
3	4	Stijn Desmet	Belgium	1:34.578	QAB, ADV
	4	Pavel Sitnikov	Russia		PEN

=== Semifinals ===
==== Semifinals C/D ====
QC – qualified for Final C
QD – qualified for Final D
PEN – penalty

Rank	Heat	Name	Country	Time	Notes
1	1	Aaron Heo	United States	1:53.861	QC
2	1	Kārlis Krūzbergs	Latvia	1:54.695	QC
3	1	Martinius Elvebakken	Norway	1:54.966	QD
1	2	Tjerk de Boer	Netherlands	1:40.797	QC
2	2	Yerkebulan Shamukhanov	Kazakhstan	1:41.000	QC
3	2	Moritz Kreuseler	Germany	1:42.414	QD

==== Semifinals A/B ====
QA – qualified for Final A
QB – qualified for Final B

Rank	Heat	Name	Country	Time	Notes
1	1	Hwang Dae-heon	South Korea	1:27.312	QA
2	1	Shaoang Liu	Hungary	1:27.428	QA
3	1	Kazuki Yoshinaga	Japan	1:28.295	QB
	1	Hong Kyung-hwan	South Korea		PEN
1	2	Ma Wei	China	1:27.200	QA
2	2	Kiichi Shigehiro	Japan	1:27.288	QA
3	2	Stijn Desmet	Belgium	1:28.946	QB
4	2	András Sziklási	Hungary	1:31.209	QA, ADV
	2	Quentin Fercoq	France		PEN

=== Finals ===
==== Final D ====
Rank	Name	Country	Time	Notes
12	Moritz Kreuseler	Germany	1:43.506	
13	Martinius Elvebakken	Norway	1:43.686	

==== Final C ====
Rank	Name	Country	Time	Notes
8	Tjerk de Boer	Netherlands	1:34.836	
9	Yerkebulan Shamukhanov	Kazakhstan	1:35.420	
10	Aaron Heo	United States	1:35.707	
11	Kārlis Krūzbergs	Latvia	1:40.632	

==== Final B ====
Rank	Name	Country	Time	Notes
6	Kazuki Yoshinaga	Japan	1:41.778	
7	Stijn Desmet	Belgium	1:41.829	

==== Final A ====
Rank	Name	Country	Time	Notes
1st place, gold medalist(s)	Hwang Dae-heon	South Korea	1:28.022	
2nd place, silver medalist(s)	Ma Wei	China	1:28.082	
3rd place, bronze medalist(s)	Shaoang Liu	Hungary	1:28.187	
4	Kiichi Shigehiro	Japan	1:28.718	
5	András Sziklási	Hungary	1:29.324	
