= Skeleton at the 2016 Winter Youth Olympics – Girls' =

Girls' Skeleton at the II Winter Youth Olympic Games
- Venue: Lillehammer Olympic Bobsleigh and Luge Track
- Dates: 19 February
- Competitors: 20 from 13 nations
- Winning time: 1:50.23

Medalists
1st place, gold medalist(s)		Ashleigh Fay Pittaway	Great Britain
2nd place, silver medalist(s)		Hannah Neise	Germany
3rd place, bronze medalist(s)		Agathe Bessard	France

The girls' skeleton event at the 2016 Winter Youth Olympics took place on 19 February at the Lillehammer Olympic Bobsleigh and Luge Track.

== Results ==
Rank	Bib	Athlete	Country	Run 1	Rank 1	Run 2	Rank 2	Total	Behind
1st place, gold medalist(s)	2	Ashleigh Fay Pittaway	Great Britain	55.08	1	55.15	1	1:50.23	–
2nd place, silver medalist(s)	8	Hannah Neise	Germany	55.43	2	55.76	2	1:51.19	+0.96
3rd place, bronze medalist(s)	13	Agathe Bessard	France	56.24	4	56.21	4	1:52.45	+2.22
4	6	Paula Kristiāna Lāce	Latvia	56.39	6	56.07	3	1:52.46	+2.23
5	11	Dārta Estere Zunte	Latvia	56.23	3	56.70	10	1:52.93	+2.70
6	16	Julia Falk	Sweden	56.30	5	56.85	13	1:53.15	+2.92
7	7	Diana Puşcaşu	Romania	56.73	8	56.45	7	1:53.18	+2.95
8	10	Alina Tararychenkova	Russia	56.77	9	56.42	6	1:53.19	+2.96
9	4	Rebecca Hass	United States	56.95	11	56.58	8	1:53.53	+3.30
10	15	Mayu Ijichi	Japan	57.20	13	56.69	9	1:53.89	+3.66
11	5	Daria Miroiu	Romania	56.86	10	57.16	14	1:54.02	+3.79
12	9	Mariia Surovtseva	Russia	57.29	14	56.81	11	1:54.10	+3.87
13	17	Joanna Lahovary Olsson	Sweden	57.95	18	56.29	5	1:54.24	+4.01
14	18	Noëlle Vennemann	Netherlands	57.47	15	56.81	11	1:54.28	+4.05
15	1	Alexandra Vicol	Romania	56.50	7	57.80	17	1:54.30	+4.07
16	3	Kalyn McGuire	United States	57.19	12	57.61	16	1:54.80	+4.57
17	12	Heo Hye-gyo	South Korea	57.51	16	57.51	15	1:55.02	+4.79
18	19	Laura Vargas	Canada	58.03	19	57.85	18	1:55.88	+5.65
19	20	Madoka Oi	Japan	57.70	17	58.82	20	1:56.52	+6.29
20	14	Laura Amaro	Brazil	58.61	20	58.05	19	1:56.66	+6.43
