= Short-track speed skating at the 2016 Winter Youth Olympics – Girls' 500 metres =

Girls' 500 metres at the II Winter Youth Olympic Games
- Venue: Gjøvik Olympic Cavern Hall
- Dates: 16 February
- Competitors: 15 from 12 nations
- Winning time: 46.648

Medalists
1st place, gold medalist(s)		Zang Yize	China
2nd place, silver medalist(s)		Petra Jászapáti	Hungary
3rd place, bronze medalist(s)		Katrin Manoilova	Bulgaria

The girls' 500 metres in short track speed skating at the 2016 Winter Youth Olympics was held on 16 February at the Gjøvik Olympic Cavern Hall.

== Results ==
QAB – qualified for the semifinals A/B
QCD – qualified for the semifinals C/D
PEN – penalty
ADA – advanced

=== Quarterfinals ===
Rank	Heat	Name	Country	Time	Notes
1	1	Kim Ji-yoo	South Korea	44.253	QAB
2	1	Petra Jászapáti	Hungary	44.855	QAB
3	1	Yelizaveta Kuznetsova	Russia	46.696	QCD
4	1	Julia Moore	Australia	48.897	QCD
1	2	Katrin Manoilova	Bulgaria	45.897	QAB
2	2	Shione Kaminaga	Japan	46.032	QAB
3	2	Gloria Ioriatti	Italy	46.103	QCD
4	2	Anita Nagay	Kazakhstan	48.463	QCD
1	3	Zang Yize	China	45.106	QAB
2	3	Lee Su-youn	South Korea	45.228	QAB
3	3	Gioya Lancee	Netherlands	46.247	QCD
4	3	Ane Farstad	Norway	1:24.363	QCD
1	4	Gong Li	China	45.397	QAB
2	4	Angelina Tarasova	Russia	48.393	QAB
3	4	Anna Seidel	Germany	DNF	QCD

=== Semifinals ===
==== Semifinals C/D ====
QC – qualified for Final C
QD – qualified for Final D
PEN – penalty

Rank	Heat	Name	Country	Time	Notes
1	1	Yelizaveta Kuznetsova	Russia	46.755	QC
2	1	Gioya Lancee	Netherlands	46.813	QC
3	1	Julia Moore	Australia	48.196	QD
4	1	Ane Farstad	Norway	50.538	QD
1	2	Anna Seidel	Germany	46.779	QC
2	2	Anita Nagay	Kazakhstan	1:05.766	QC
	2	Gloria Ioriatti	Italy		PEN

==== Semifinals A/B ====
QA – qualified for Final A
QB – qualified for Final B

Rank	Heat	Name	Country	Time	Notes
1	1	Zang Yize	China	45.480	QA
2	1	Lee Su-youn	South Korea	46.014	QA
3	1	Shione Kaminaga	Japan	46.741	QB
	1	Gong Li	China		PEN
1	2	Kim Ji-yoo	South Korea	44.588	QA
2	2	Petra Jászapáti	Hungary	44.864	QA
3	2	Katrin Manoilova	Bulgaria	46.512	QB
4	2	Angelina Tarasova	Russia	48.287	QB

=== Finals ===
==== Final D ====
Rank	Name	Country	Time	Notes
10	Julia Moore	Australia	50.606	
11	Ane Farstad	Norway	1:03.617	

==== Final C ====
Rank	Name	Country	Time	Notes
6	Anna Seidel	Germany	45.857	
7	Yelizaveta Kuznetsova	Russia	46.207	
8	Gioya Lancee	Netherlands	46.324	
9	Anita Nagay	Kazakhstan	48.103	

==== Final B ====
Rank	Name	Country	Time	Notes
3rd place, bronze medalist(s)	Katrin Manoilova	Bulgaria	46.337	
4	Angelina Tarasova	Russia	47.861	
5	Shione Kaminaga	Japan	47.916	

==== Final A ====
Rank	Name	Country	Time	Notes
1st place, gold medalist(s)	Zang Yize	China	46.648	
2nd place, silver medalist(s)	Petra Jászapáti	Hungary	DNF	
	Kim Ji-yoo	South Korea		PEN
	Lee Su-youn	South Korea		PEN
