= Luge at the 2016 Winter Youth Olympics – Doubles =

Doubles at the II Winter Youth Olympic Games
- Venue: Lillehammer Olympic Bobsleigh and Luge Track
- Dates: 15 February
- Competitors: 26 from 13 nations
- Winning time: 1:44.260

Medalists
1st place, gold medalist(s)		Felix Schwarz; Lukas Gufler	Italy
2nd place, silver medalist(s)		Hannes Orlamünder; Paul Gubitz	Germany
3rd place, bronze medalist(s)		Vsevolod Kashkin; Konstantin Korshunov	Russia

The doubles luge at the 2016 Winter Youth Olympics took place on 15 February at the Lillehammer Olympic Bobsleigh and Luge Track.

== Results ==
Rank	Bib	Athlete	Country	Run 1	Rank 1	Run 2	Rank 2	Total	Behind
1st place, gold medalist(s)	8	Felix Schwarz; Lukas Gufler	Italy	52.200	1	52.060	1	1:44.260	–
2nd place, silver medalist(s)	10	Hannes Orlamünder; Paul Gubitz	Germany	52.599	2	52.515	3	1:45.114	+0.854
3rd place, bronze medalist(s)	3	Vsevolod Kashkin; Konstantin Korshunov	Russia	52.896	4	52.376	2	1:45.272	+1.012
4	11	Vasile Marian Gîtlan; Flavius Ion Crăciun	Romania	52.772	3	52.707	4	1:45.479	+1.219
5	9	Matt Riddle; Adam Shippit	Canada	53.046	5	52.909	5	1:45.955	+1.695
6	4	Tomáš Vaverčák; Matej Zmij	Slovakia	53.405	6	53.663	6	1:47.068	+2.808
7	5	Jakob Schmid; Juri Gatt	Austria	53.699	7	53.883	9	1:47.582	+3.322
8	7	Duncan Biles; Alanson Owen	United States	54.056	8	54.068	10	1:48.124	+3.864
9	1	Aksels Tupe; Kaspars Šļahota	Latvia	54.350	10	53.819	8	1:48.169	+3.909
10	2	Artur Zubel; Daniel Rola	Poland	54.395	12	54.147	11	1:48.542	+4.282
11	6	Roman Yefremov; Denis Tatyanchenko	Kazakhstan	54.235	9	54.725	13	1:48.960	+4.700
12	12	Filip Vejdělek; Zdeněk Pěkný	Czech Republic	54.371	11	54.608	12	1:48.979	+4.719
13	13	Andriy Lysetskyy; Myroslav Levkovych	Ukraine	57.218	13	53.749	7	1:50.967	+6.707
