= Belarus at the 2016 Winter Youth Olympics =

- IOC code: BLR
- NOC: Belarus Olympic Committee
- Website: www.noc.by

in Lillehammer
- Competitors: 16 in 7 sports
- Medals: Gold 0 Silver 0 Bronze 0 Total 0

Winter Youth Olympics appearances (overview)
- 2012; 2016; 2020; 2024

Belarus competed at the 2016 Winter Youth Olympics in Lillehammer, Norway from 12 to 21 February 2016.

== Alpine skiing ==
Boys

Athlete	Event	Run 1		Run 2		Total	
Athlete	Event	Time	Rank	Time	Rank	Time	Rank
Uladzislau Chertsin	Slalom	DNF		did not advance			
Uladzislau Chertsin	Giant slalom	1:29.56	43	1:39.13	37	3:08.69	37
Uladzislau Chertsin	Super-G	—N/a				1:18.06	43
Uladzislau Chertsin	Combined	DNF		did not advance			

== Biathlon ==
Boys

Athlete	Event	Time	Misses	Rank
Aliaksandr Matskevich	Sprint	19:53.0	1	8
Aliaksandr Matskevich	Pursuit	31:54.4	7	18
Kiryl Tsiuryn	Sprint	21:23.2	4	28
Kiryl Tsiuryn	Pursuit	31:29.2	3	14

Girls

Athlete	Event	Time	Misses	Rank
Darya Iyeropes	Sprint	20:04.1	2	23
Darya Iyeropes	Pursuit	29:01.2	5	23
Natallia Karnitskaya	Sprint	21:02.7	5	34
Natallia Karnitskaya	Pursuit	28:40.5	3	21

Mixed

Athletes	Event	Time	Misses	Rank
Natallia Karnitskaya; Kiryl Tsiuryn	Single mixed relay	45:06.5	4+17	14
Natallia Karnitskaya; Darya Iyeropes; Aliaksandr Matskevich; Kiryl Tsiuryn	Mixed relay	1:27:08.3	5+21	12

== Cross-country skiing ==
Boys

Athlete	Event	Qualification		Quarterfinal		Semifinal		Final	
Athlete	Event	Time	Rank	Time	Rank	Time	Rank	Time	Rank
Tsimur Laskin	10 km freestyle	—N/a						25:40.3	19
Tsimur Laskin	Classical sprint	3:10.42	23 Q	3:09.11	4	did not advance			
Tsimur Laskin	Cross-country cross	3:22.18	33	—N/a		did not advance			

Girls

Athlete	Event	Qualification		Quarterfinal		Semifinal		Final	
Athlete	Event	Time	Rank	Time	Rank	Time	Rank	Time	Rank
Hanna Karaliova	5 km freestyle	—N/a						13:59.6	12
Hanna Karaliova	Classical sprint	3:42.32	20 Q	3:37.74	4	did not advance			
Hanna Karaliova	Cross-country cross	3:49.58	20 Q	—N/a		3:46.02	7	did not advance	

== Figure skating ==
Couples

Athletes	Event	SP/SD		FS/FD		Total	
Athletes	Event	Points	Rank	Points	Rank	Points	Rank
Emilia Kalehanava; Uladzislau Palkhouski	Ice dancing	47.88	6	60.24	9	108.12	6

Mixed NOC team trophy

Athletes	Event	Free skate/Free dance					
Athletes	Event	Ice dance	Pairs	Girls	Boys	Total	
Athletes	Event	Points Team points	Points Team points	Points Team points	Points Team points	Points	Rank
Team Hope; Emilia Kalehanava / Uladzislau Palkhouski (BLR); Kim Su-yeon / Kim Hyung-tae (KOR); Lucrezia Gennaro (ITA); Adrien Bannister (ITA)	Team trophy	65.42; 5	70.50; 2	83.64; 4	119.28; 5	16	7

== Ice hockey ==
Athlete	Event	Qualification		Final	
Athlete	Event	Points	Rank	Points	Rank
Andrei Pavlenka	Boys' individual skills challenge	5	16	did not advance	
Darya Maksimchik	Girls' individual skills challenge	7	13	did not advance	

== Snowboarding ==
Slopestyle

Athlete	Event	Final			
Athlete	Event	Run 1	Run 2	Best	Rank
Darina Murawskaia	Girls' slopestyle	45.75	23.50	45.75	13

== Speed skating ==
Boys

Athlete	Event	Race 1		Race 2		Final	
Athlete	Event	Time	Rank	Time	Rank	Time	Rank
Yevgeny Bolgov	500 m	38.59	20	37.839	16	76.43	17
Yevgeny Bolgov	1500 m	—N/a				1:55.88	9
Yevgeny Bolgov	Mass start	—N/a				5 pts	4
Victor Rudenko	500 m	38.51	18	37.93	17	76.44	18
Victor Rudenko	1500 m	—N/a				1:56.52	12
Victor Rudenko	Mass start	—N/a				5:54.86	15

Girls

Athlete	Event	Race 1		Race 2		Final	
Athlete	Event	Time	Rank	Time	Rank	Time	Rank
Anna Nifantava	500 m	42.42	18	41.84	15	84.26	16
Anna Nifantava	1500 m	—N/a				2:18.13	23
Anna Nifantava	Mass start	—N/a				DSQ	
Yauheniya Varabyova	500 m	41.53	11	41.81	14	83.34	12
Yauheniya Varabyova	1500 m	—N/a				2:12.25	17
Yauheniya Varabyova	Mass start	—N/a				1 pts	6

Mixed team sprint

Athletes	Event	Final	
Athletes	Event	Time	Rank
Team 2 Mariya Gromova (KAZ); Han Mei (CHN); Mathias Hauer (AUT); Victor Rudenko (BLR)	Mixed team sprint	2:00.79	10
Team 5 Erika Lindgren (SWE); Isabelle van Elst (NED); Yevgeny Bolgov (BLR); Samuli Suomalainen (FIN)	Mixed team sprint	2:16.73	11
Team 11; Anna Nifantava (BLR); Yuna Onodera (JPN); Daan Baks (NED); Francesco Betti (ITA)	Mixed team sprint	2:00.13	9
Team 12; Lea Scholz (GER); Yauheniya Varabyova (BLR); Daichi Horikawa (JPN); Lukas Mann (GER)	Mixed team sprint	1:58.95	4

== See also ==
- Belarus at the 2016 Summer Olympics
