= Ondřej Pažout =

Czech Nordic combined skier

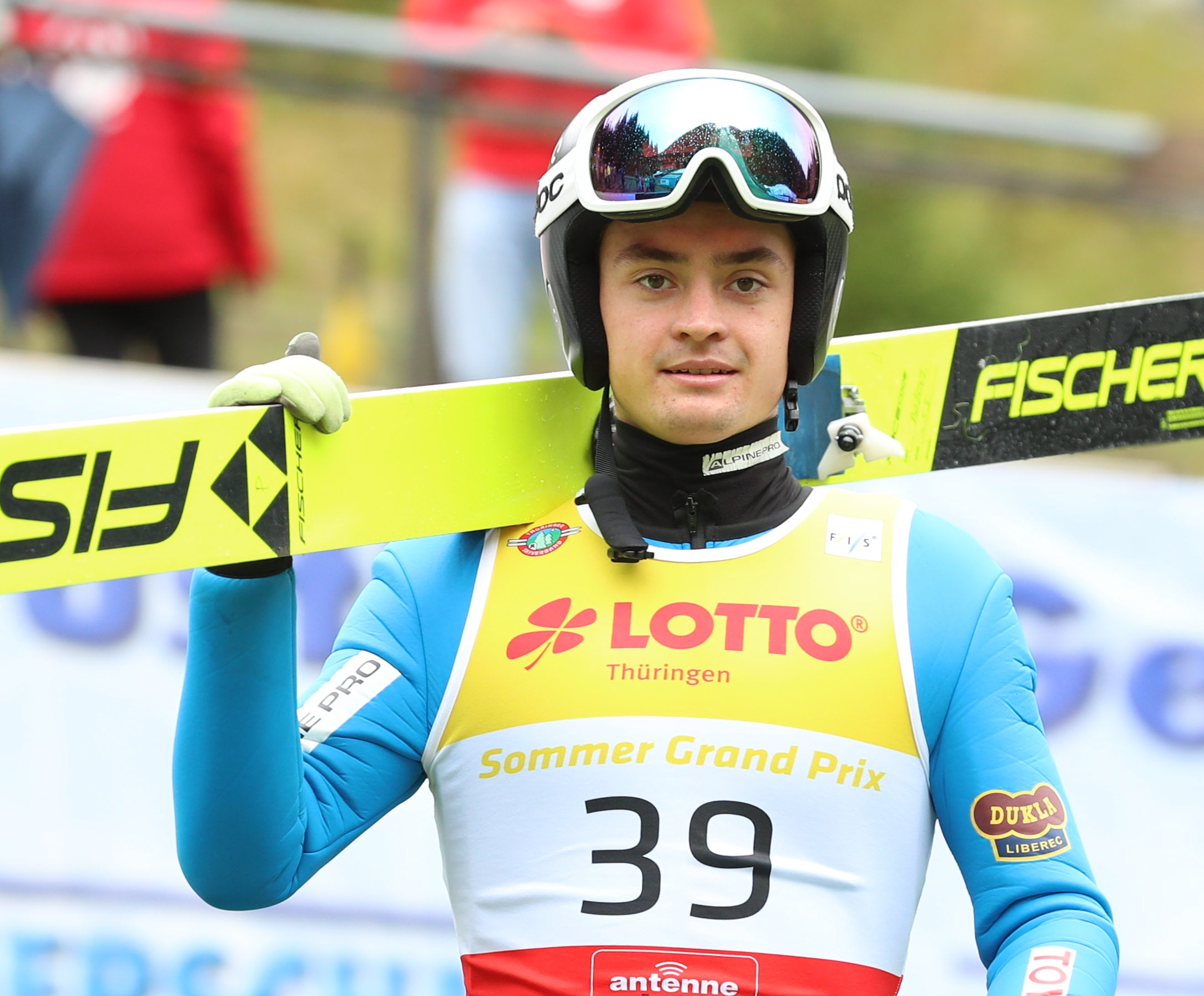
- Pažout in 2021

Personal information
- Born: 1 July 1998 (age 28) Turnov, Czech Republic
- Height: 5 ft 8 in (173 cm)

Sport
- Country: Czech Republic
- Sport: Nordic combined skiing

Ondřej Pažout (born 1 July 1998) is a Czech Nordic combined skier who competes internationally.

He competed at the 2018 Winter Olympics. He also competed at the 2022 Winter Olympics.
