= Irene Lardschneider =

Italian biathlete (born 1998)

Personal information
- Nationality: Italian
- Born: 9 February 1998 (age 28) Brixen, Italy

Sport
- Sport: Biathlon
Medal record
Women's biathlon
Representing Italy
Winter Youth Olympics
| Bronze medal – third place | 2016 Lillehammer | Mixed relay |
Youth World Championships
| Gold medal – first place | 2017 Osrblie | 6 km sprint |
| Gold medal – first place | 2017 Osrblie | 7.5 km pursuit |
| Bronze medal – third place | 2017 Osrblie | 3 × 6 km relay |

Irene Lardschneider (born 9 February 1998) is a former Italian biathlete.

== Career results ==
=== World Championships ===
| Event | Individual | Sprint | Pursuit | Mass start | Relay | Mixed relay | Single mixed relay |
|---|---|---|---|---|---|---|---|
| (Slovenia) 2021 Pokljuka | 85th | 24th | 51st | — | — | — | — |
