= Aaron Kostner =

Italian Nordic combined skier

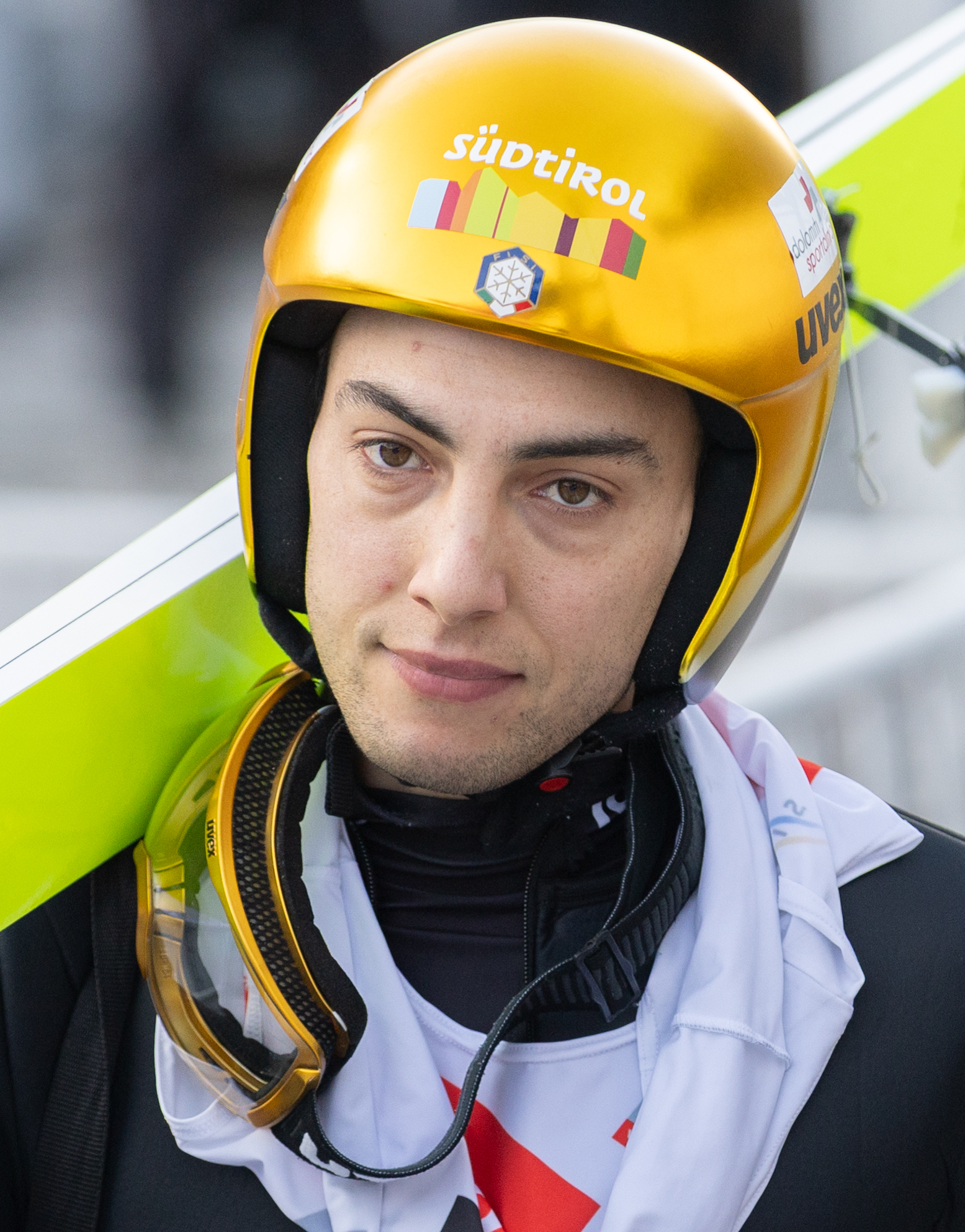
- Kostner in 2026

Personal information
- Born: 8 July 1999 (age 26) Sterzing, South Tyrol, Italy

Sport
- Country: Italy
- Sport: Nordic combined skiing

Aaron Kostner (born 8 July 1999) is an Italian Nordic combined skier.

He competed at the 2018 and 2026 Winter Olympics.
