= Allan Dahl Johansson =

Norwegian speed skater (born 1998)

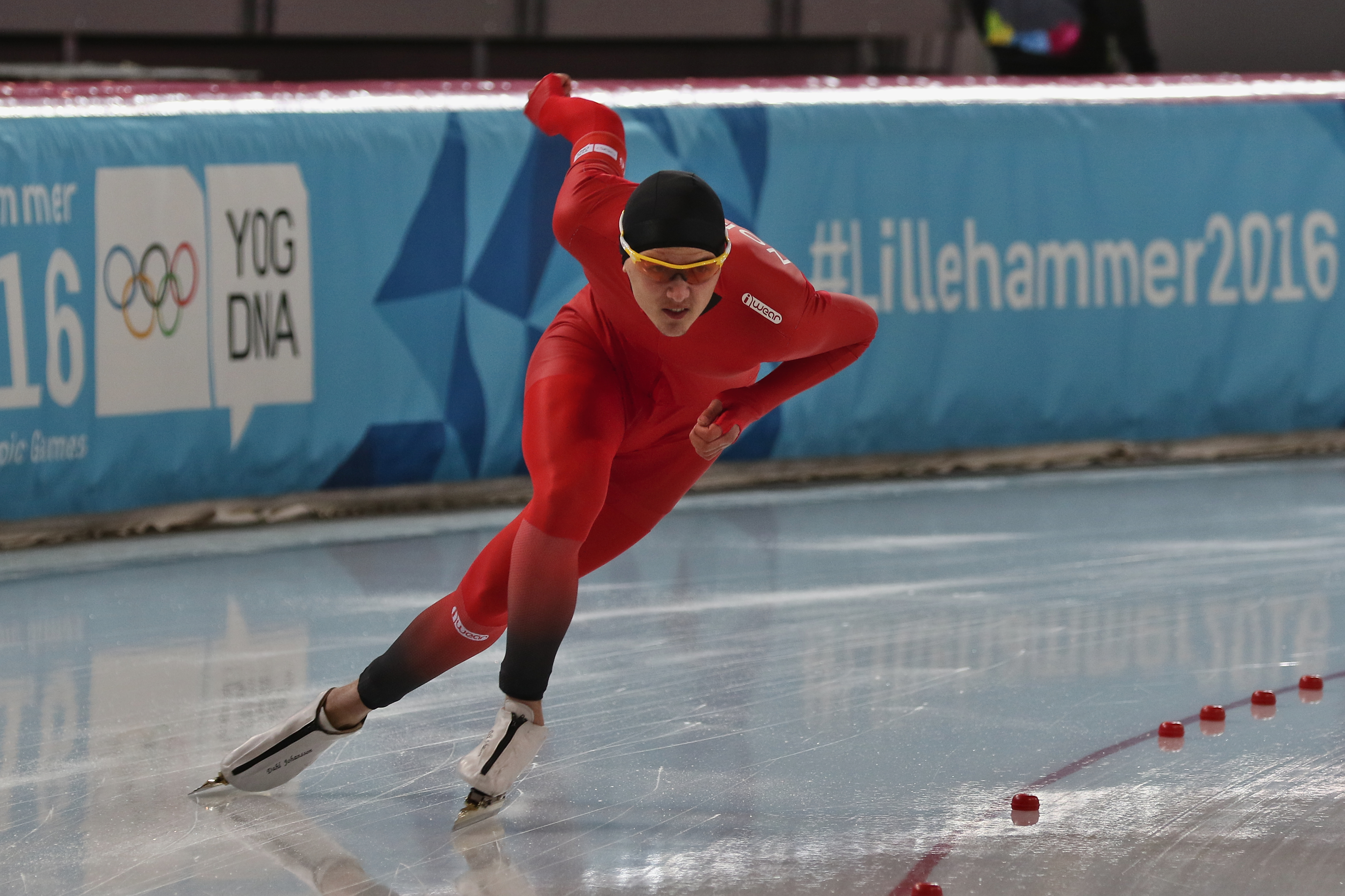
- Johansson in 2016

Personal information
- Born: 5 October 1998 (age 27)

Sport
- Country: Norway
- Sport: Speed skating
- Club: Aktiv SK
Medal record
Men's speed skating
Representing Norway
World Single Distance Championships
Bronze medal – third place	2023 Heerenveen	Team pursuit
European Championships
Silver medal – second place	2022 Heerenveen	Team pursuit
Bronze medal – third place	2022 Heerenveen	1500 m
Bronze medal – third place	2024 Heerenveen	Mass start

Allan Dahl Johansson (born 5 October 1998) is a Norwegian speed-skater who competes internationally.

== Biography ==
Johansson competed for Norway in men's 1500m speedskating event at the 2018 Winter Olympics in PyeongChang, South Korea and placed 35th.

Johansson represents the club Aktiv SK. In December 2017, he set new junior world records in 1,500m and 3,000m.

In March 2018, Johansson won Gold in Junior World Cup in Salt Lake City and set the record in 3,000m.

In 2016, he received more than US$12,000 (94,500 NOK) in sponsorships, with the second largest funding source coming from crowdfunding. He wrote in his crowdfunding application:

"This winter I will focus even more on the World Cup and Junior World Championships. There are a lot of travel and training expenses, and competition everyday. All contributions will come in handy and go exclusively to be faster on skates. Rounds of the season with a three-week gathering in Calgary to train in similar conditions that await me in the Junior World Championships in 2018 in Salt Lake City which is one of my main goals."

Johansson won the World Skating Cup 2 years later.

Johansson is the first Norwegian World Junior Allround Speed Skating Champion since Sverre Lunde Pedersen in 2012.
