= Chung Jae-woong =

South Korean speed skater (born 1999)

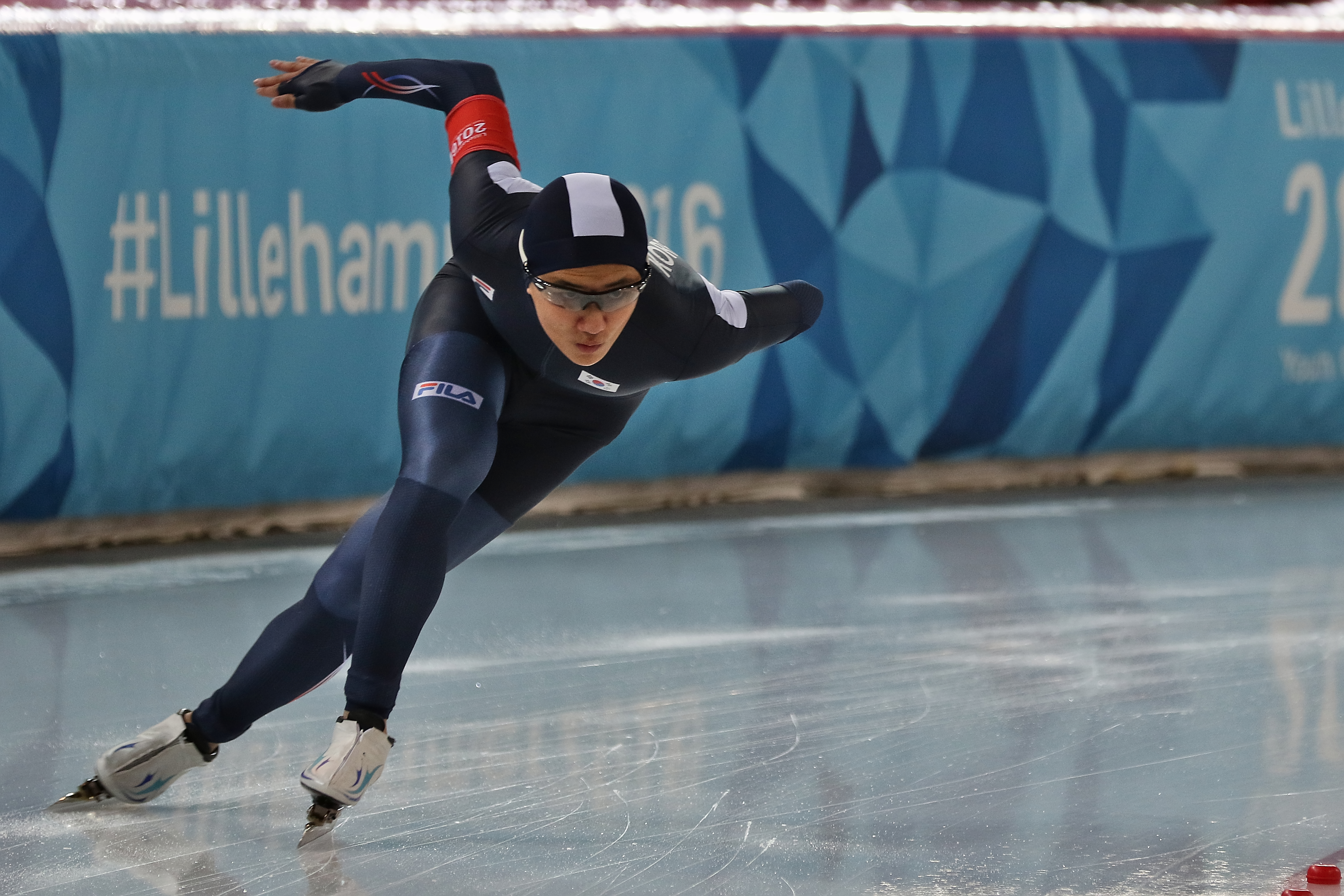
- Chung Jae-woong at the 2016 Winter Youth Olympics in Norway.

Personal information
- Nationality: South Korea
- Born: 2 June 1999 (age 27)

Sport
- Sport: Speed skating

Chung Jae-woong (born 2 June 1999) is a South Korean speed skater who competes internationally.

He participated at the 2018 Winter Olympics, in men's 1000 metres.
