= Bobsleigh at the Winter Youth Olympics =

Bobsleigh competitions at a multi-sport event

- Governing body: IBSF
- Events: 2 (men: 1; womens: 1; mixed: 0)

Games
- 2012; 2016; 2020; 2024

Bobsleigh is one of the sports featured at the Winter Youth Olympics. It has been part of the games since the inaugural edition in 2012.

== Medal summaries ==
=== Monobob ===
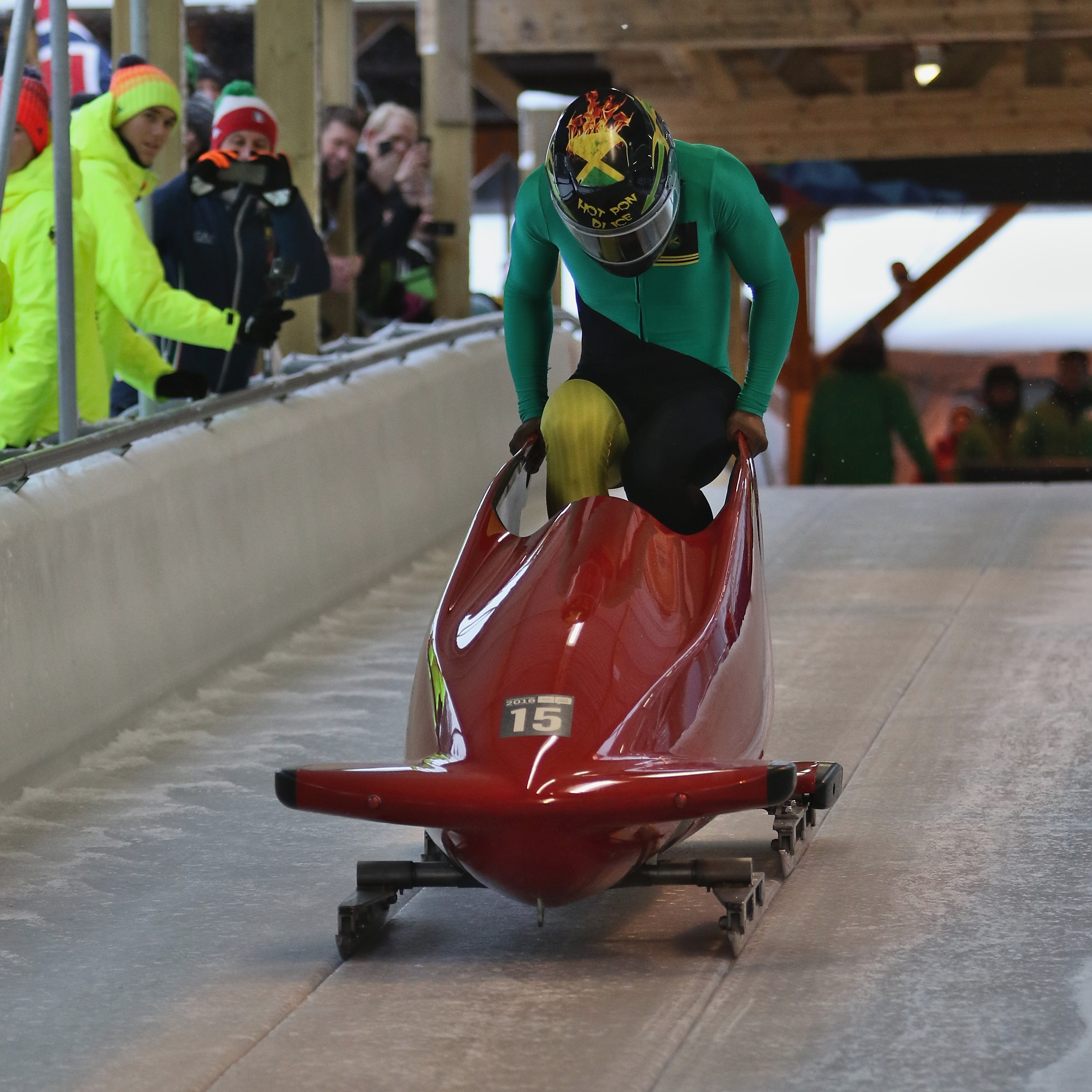
Daniel Mayhew competing at the 2016 Games

Games	Gold	Silver	Bronze
2016 Lillehammer	Jonas Jannusch; Germany	Maksim Ivanov; Russia	Kristian Olsen; Norway
2020 Lausanne	Alexander Czudaj; Germany; Andrei Nica; Romania	not awarded	Quentin Sanzo; Liechtenstein
2024 Gangwon	So Jae-hwan; South Korea	Jonathan Lourimi; Tunisia	Chi Xiangyu; China

=== Two-boys ===
Games	Gold	Silver	Bronze
2012 Innsbruck	Patrick Baumgartner; Alessandro Grande; Italy	Benjamin Maier; Robert Ofensberger; Austria	Rudy Rinaldi; Jérémy Torre; Monaco

=== Monobob ===
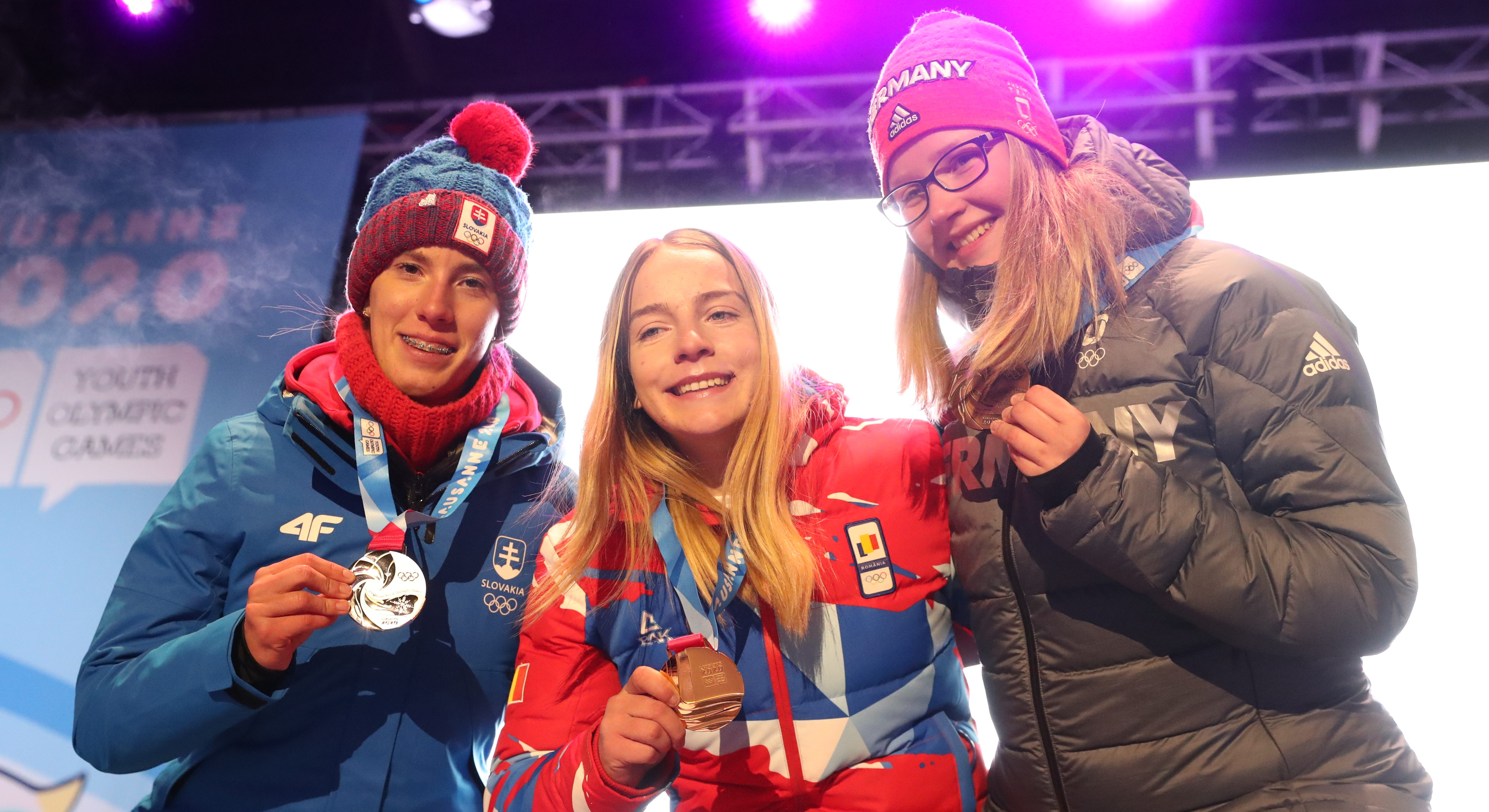
2020 podium

Games	Gold	Silver	Bronze
2016 Lillehammer	Laura Nolte; Germany	Mercedes Schulte; Austria	Kelsea Purchall; Great Britain
2020 Lausanne	Georgeta Popescu; Romania	Viktória Čerňanská; Slovakia	Celine Harms; Germany
2024 Gangwon	Maja Voigt; Denmark	Agnese Campeol; Thailand	Mihaela Alexia Anton; Romania

=== Two-girls ===
Games	Gold	Silver	Bronze
2012 Innsbruck	Marije van Huigenbosch; Sanne Dekker; Netherlands	Mica McNeill; Jazmin Sawyers; Great Britain	Kimberley Bos; Mandy Groot; Netherlands

== Medal table ==
As of the 2024 Winter Youth Olympics.

Rank	Nation	Gold	Silver	Bronze	Total
1	Germany	3	0	1	4
2	Romania	2	0	1	3
3	Netherlands	1	0	1	2
4	Denmark	1	0	0	1
4	Italy	1	0	0	1
4	South Korea	1	0	0	1
7	Austria	0	2	0	2
8	Great Britain	0	1	1	2
9	Russia	0	1	0	1
9	Slovakia	0	1	0	1
9	Thailand	0	1	0	1
9	Tunisia	0	1	0	1
13	China	0	0	1	1
13	Liechtenstein	0	0	1	1
13	Monaco	0	0	1	1
13	Norway	0	0	1	1
Totals (16 entries)		9	7	8	24

== Participating nations ==
• = Did not compete in the sport, × = the country did not participate in the Games

Event	12	16	20	24	Years
Austria	2	2	•	1	3
Brazil	•	2	1	2	3
Canada	4	4	2	2	4
Colombia	×	•	1	•	1
China	•	•	•	1	1
Croatia	•	1	1	•	2
Denmark	•	•	•	1	1
France	•	•	2	1	2
Germany	2	3	3	3	4
Great Britain	6	4	2	2	4
Italy	4	•	1	•	2
Jamaica	×	1	×	2	2
Japan	2	•	•	•	1
Latvia	2	•	2	2	3
Liechtenstein	•	1	2	•	2
Monaco	2	•	×	•	1
Netherlands	4	•	•	•	1
Norway	•	1	1	•	2
Poland	•	•	1	1	2
Romania	2	2	3	4	4
Russia	2	3	2	×	3
Slovakia	•	1	2	•	2
South Korea	2	1	2	2	4
Sweden	•	•	1	•	1
Spain	•	1	•	•	1
Switzerland	•	2	3	•	2
Chinese Taipei	•	•	2	•	1
Thailand	×	×	•	2	1
Tunisia	×	×	×	3	1
United States	2	1	2	3	4
Total athletes	36	30	36	30	
Total countries	13	16	20	16	

== See also ==
- Bobsleigh at the Winter Olympics
