= Cross-country skiing at the 2016 Winter Youth Olympics – Girls' 5 kilometre freestyle =

Girls' 5 kilometre freestyle at the II Winter Youth Olympic Games
- Venue: Birkebeineren Ski Stadium
- Date: 18 February
- Competitors: 39 from 32 nations
- Winning time: 12:58.8

Medalists
1st place, gold medalist(s)		Maya Yakunina	Russia
2nd place, silver medalist(s)		Chi Chunxue	China
3rd place, bronze medalist(s)		Rebecca Immonen	Finland

The girls' 5 kilometre freestyle cross-country skiing competition at the 2016 Winter Youth Olympics was held on 18 February at the Birkebeineren Ski Stadium.

== Results ==
The race was started at 10:00.

Rank	Bib	Name	Country	Time	Deficit
1st place, gold medalist(s)	39	Maya Yakunina	Russia	12:58.8	–
2nd place, silver medalist(s)	4	Chi Chunxue	China	13:29.9	+31.1
3rd place, bronze medalist(s)	25	Rebecca Immonen	Finland	13:35.9	+37.1
4	30	Johanna Hagström	Sweden	13:39.5	+40.7
5	40	Laura Chamiot-Maitral	France	13:40.0	+41.2
6	38	Anja Mandeljc	Slovenia	13:40.4	+41.6
7	14	Barbora Havlíčková	Czech Republic	13:40.9	+42.1
8	37	Juliette Ducordeau	France	13:50.4	+51.6
9	26	Moa Lundgren	Sweden	13:51.7	+52.9
10	22	Roosa Niemi	Finland	13:55.2	+56.4
11	29	Désirée Steiner	Switzerland	13:57.0	+58.2
12	5	Hanna Karaliova	Belarus	13:59.6	+1:00.8
13	10	Anna-Maria Dietze	Germany	14:00.3	+1:01.5
14	32	Anzhelika Tarassova	Kazakhstan	14:07.2	+1:08.4
15	24	Hikari Miyazaki	Japan	14:07.8	+1:09.0
16	23	Annika Richardson	Canada	14:09.8	+1:11.0
17	34	Hannah Halvorsen	United States	14:13.8	+1:15.0
18	15	Stine-Lise Truu	Estonia	14:16.3	+1:17.5
19	35	Chiara De Zolt	Italy	14:18.0	+1:19.2
20	28	Giuliana Werro	Switzerland	14:18.3	+1:19.5
21	2	Patricija Eiduka	Latvia	14:23.4	+1:24.6
22	36	Martine Engebretsen	Norway	14:24.8	+1:26.0
23	12	Celine Mayer	Germany	14:29.8	+1:31.0
24	16	Yuliya Petrova	Russia	14:50.5	+1:51.7
25	31	Je Sang-mi	South Korea	14:55.6	+1:56.8
26	27	Anna Juppe	Austria	14:58.7	+1:59.9
27	21	Yuliia Krol	Ukraine	15:01.8	+2:03.0
28	1	Lillian Boland	Australia	15:10.6	+2:11.8
29	3	Klaudia Kołodziej	Poland	15:11.3	+2:12.5
30	19	Alba Puigdefabregas	Spain	15:16.2	+2:17.4
31	18	Güllü Akalın	Turkey	15:18.5	+2:19.7
32	13	Nansi Okoro	Bulgaria	15:24.3	+2:25.5
33	6	Nina Klemenčič	Slovenia	15:26.7	+2:27.9
34	17	Carola Vila	Andorra	15:28.6	+2:29.8
35	11	Anja Ilić	Serbia	15:36.5	+2:37.7
36	20	Gabrijela Skender	Croatia	15:47.5	+2:48.7
37	8	Katarina Bogdanović	Bosnia and Herzegovina	15:51.1	+2:52.3
38	7	Zuzana Šefčíková	Slovakia	16:02.3	+3:03.5
39	9	Nicoleta Luciana Sovarschi	Romania	16:02.6	+3:03.8
	33	Nora Ulvang	Norway	DNS	
