= Cross-country skiing at the 2016 Winter Youth Olympics – Girls' sprint =

Girls' sprint at the II Winter Youth Olympic Games
- Venue: Birkebeineren Ski Stadium
- Date: 16 February
- Competitors: 40 from 32 nations

Medalists
| 1st place, gold medalist(s) | | Johanna Hagström | Sweden |
| 2nd place, silver medalist(s) | | Yuliya Petrova | Russia |
| 3rd place, bronze medalist(s) | | Martine Engebretsen | Norway |

The girls' sprint classical cross-country skiing competition at the 2016 Winter Youth Olympics was held on 16 February at the Birkebeineren Ski Stadium. The sprint distance was 1.3km.

== Results ==
=== Qualifying ===
| Rank | Bib | Athlete | Country | Time | Deficit | Note |
|---|---|---|---|---|---|---|
| 1 | 7 | Johanna Hagström | Sweden | 3:24.38 | – | Q |
| 2 | 1 | Yuliya Petrova | Russia | 3:31.55 | +7.17 | Q |
| 3 | 12 | Anja Mandeljc | Slovenia | 3:31.82 | +7.44 | Q |
| 4 | 11 | Rebecca Immonen | Finland | 3:32.26 | +7.88 | Q |
| 5 | 3 | Moa Lundgren | Sweden | 3:32.40 | +8.02 | Q |
| 6 | 14 | Martine Engebretsen | Norway | 3:32.68 | +8.30 | Q |
| 7 | 6 | Laura Chamiot-Maitral | France | 3:35.51 | +11.13 | Q |
| 8 | 15 | Désirée Steiner | Switzerland | 3:35.60 | +11.22 | Q |
| 9 | 21 | Nina Klemenčič | Slovenia | 3:35.61 | +11.23 | Q |
| 10 | 5 | Anna-Maria Dietze | Germany | 3:36.34 | +11.96 | Q |
| 11 | 10 | Stine-Lise Truu | Estonia | 3:37.30 | +12.92 | Q |
| 12 | 28 | Gabrijela Skender | Croatia | 3:37.72 | +13.34 | Q |
| 13 | 4 | Hannah Halvorsen | United States | 3:38.73 | +14.35 | Q |
| 14 | 2 | Maya Yakunina | Russia | 3:39.14 | +14.76 | Q |
| 15 | 9 | Anzhelika Tarassova | Kazakhstan | 3:39.51 | +15.13 | Q |
| 16 | 24 | Roosa Niemi | Finland | 3:39.89 | +15.51 | Q |
| 17 | 39 | Barbora Havlíčková | Czech Republic | 3:39.89 | +15.51 | Q |
| 18 | 8 | Juliette Ducordeau | France | 3:40.36 | +15.98 | Q |
| 19 | 26 | Chi Chunxue | China | 3:40.94 | +16.56 | Q |
| 20 | 19 | Hanna Karaliova | Belarus | 3:42.32 | +17.94 | Q |
| 21 | 29 | Hikari Miyazaki | Japan | 3:42.71 | +18.33 | Q |
| 22 | 33 | Celine Mayer | Germany | 3:42.90 | +18.52 | Q |
| 23 | 18 | Giuliana Werro | Switzerland | 3:42.98 | +18.60 | Q |
| 24 | 13 | Nora Ulvang | Norway | 3:44.02 | +19.64 | Q |
| 25 | 38 | Anna Juppe | Austria | 3:44.72 | +20.34 | Q |
| 26 | 17 | Chiara De Zolt | Italy | 3:45.38 | +21.00 | Q |
| 27 | 30 | Klaudia Kołodziej | Poland | 3:45.95 | +21.57 | Q |
| 28 | 40 | Nansi Okoro | Bulgaria | 3:46.09 | +21.71 | Q |
| 29 | 34 | Yuliia Krol | Ukraine | 3:46.43 | +22.05 | Q |
| 30 | 31 | Patricija Eiduka | Latvia | 3:50.56 | +26.18 | Q |
| 31 | 23 | Zuzana Šefčíková | Slovakia | 3:50.74 | +26.36 | |
| 32 | 20 | Alba Puigdefabregas | Spain | 3:51.96 | +27.58 | |
| 33 | 16 | Annika Richardson | Canada | 3:53.42 | +29.04 | |
| 34 | 25 | Je Sang-mi | South Korea | 3:54.02 | +29.64 | |
| 35 | 37 | Carola Vila | Andorra | 3:59.21 | +34.83 | |
| 36 | 35 | Lillian Boland | Australia | 4:04.21 | +39.83 | |
| 37 | 27 | Anja Ilić | Serbia | 4:06.78 | +42.40 | |
| 38 | 22 | Nicoleta Luciana Sovarschi | Romania | 4:08.05 | +43.67 | |
| 39 | 36 | Güllü Akalın | Turkey | 4:18.09 | +53.71 | |
| 40 | 32 | Katarina Bogdanović | Bosnia and Herzegovina | 4:25.53 | +1:01.15 | |

=== Quarterfinals ===
Quarterfinal 1

| Rank | Seed | Athlete | Country | Time | Deficit | Note |
|---|---|---|---|---|---|---|
| 1 | 1 | Johanna Hagström | Sweden | 3:28.56 | — | Q |
| 2 | 10 | Anna-Maria Dietze | Germany | 3:30.64 | +2.08 | Q |
| 3 | 11 | Stine-Lise Truu | Estonia | 3:31.08 | +2.52 | LL |
| 4 | 20 | Hanna Karaliova | Belarus | 3:37.74 | +9.18 | |
| 5 | 21 | Hikari Miyazaki | Japan | 3:38.83 | +10.27 | |
| 6 | 30 | Patricija Eiduka | Latvia | 3:48.44 | +19.88 | |

Quarterfinal 2

| Rank | Seed | Athlete | Country | Time | Deficit | Note |
|---|---|---|---|---|---|---|
| 1 | 4 | Rebecca Immonen | Finland | 3:30.55 | — | Q |
| 2 | 7 | Laura Chamiot-Maitral | France | 3:31.43 | +0.88 | Q |
| 3 | 24 | Nora Ulvang | Norway | 3:32.30 | +1.75 | |
| 4 | 17 | Barbora Havlíčková | Czech Republic | 3:36.45 | +5.90 | |
| 5 | 14 | Maya Yakunina | Russia | 3:39.18 | +8.63 | PF |
| 6 | 27 | Klaudia Kołodziej | Poland | 3:39.18 | +8.63 | PF |

Quarterfinal 3

| Rank | Seed | Athlete | Country | Time | Deficit | Note |
|---|---|---|---|---|---|---|
| 1 | 6 | Martine Engebretsen | Norway | 3:28.57 | — | Q |
| 2 | 5 | Moa Lundgren | Sweden | 3:28.68 | +0.11 | Q |
| 3 | 16 | Roosa Niemi | Finland | 3:36.54 | +7.97 | |
| 4 | 15 | Anzhelika Tarassova | Kazakhstan | 3:37.20 | +8.63 | |
| 5 | 26 | Chiara De Zolt | Italy | 3:43.53 | +14.96 | |
| 6 | 25 | Anna Juppe | Austria | 3:54.56 | +25.99 | |

Quarterfinal 4

| Rank | Seed | Athlete | Country | Time | Deficit | Note |
|---|---|---|---|---|---|---|
| 1 | 2 | Yuliya Petrova | Russia | 3:30.46 | — | Q |
| 2 | 12 | Gabrijela Skender | Croatia | 3:32.32 | +1.86 | Q |
| 3 | 29 | Yuliia Krol | Ukraine | 3:32.65 | +2.19 | |
| 4 | 19 | Chi Chunxue | China | 3:33.19 | +2.73 | |
| 5 | 22 | Celine Mayer | Germany | 3:37.23 | +6.77 | |
| 6 | 9 | Nina Klemenčič | Slovenia | 3:51.54 | +21.08 | |

Quarterfinal 5

| Rank | Seed | Athlete | Country | Time | Deficit | Note |
|---|---|---|---|---|---|---|
| 1 | 13 | Hannah Halvorsen | United States | 3:28.40 | — | Q |
| 2 | 8 | Désirée Steiner | Switzerland | 3:28.51 | +0.11 | Q |
| 3 | 3 | Anja Mandeljc | Slovenia | 3:29.16 | +0.76 | LL |
| 4 | 18 | Juliette Ducordeau | France | 3:36.48 | +8.08 | |
| 5 | 28 | Nansi Okoro | Bulgaria | 3:38.23 | +9.83 | PF |
| 6 | 23 | Giuliana Werro | Switzerland | 3:38.23 | +9.83 | PF |

=== Semifinals ===
Semifinal 1

| Rank | Seed | Athlete | Country | Time | Deficit | Note |
|---|---|---|---|---|---|---|
| 1 | 1 | Johanna Hagström | Sweden | 3:23.59 | — | Q |
| 2 | 6 | Martine Engebretsen | Norway | 3:24.79 | +1.20 | Q |
| 3 | 7 | Laura Chamiot-Maitral | France | 3:25.56 | +1.97 | LL |
| 4 | 4 | Rebecca Immonen | Finland | 3:29.49 | +5.90 | |
| 5 | 10 | Anna-Maria Dietze | Germany | 3:30.58 | +6.99 | |
| 6 | 11 | Stine-Lise Truu | Estonia | 3:34.62 | +11.03 | |

Semifinal 2

| Rank | Seed | Athlete | Country | Time | Deficit | Note |
|---|---|---|---|---|---|---|
| 1 | 2 | Yuliya Petrova | Russia | 3:27.24 | — | Q |
| 2 | 5 | Moa Lundgren | Sweden | 3:28.00 | +0.76 | Q |
| 3 | 13 | Hannah Halvorsen | United States | 3:28.77 | +1.53 | LL |
| 4 | 8 | Désirée Steiner | Switzerland | 3:29.64 | +2.40 | |
| 5 | 3 | Anja Mandeljc | Slovenia | 3:30.63 | +3.39 | |
| 6 | 12 | Gabrijela Skender | Croatia | 3:36.19 | +8.95 | |

=== Final ===
| Rank | Seed | Athlete | Country | Time | Deficit | Note |
|---|---|---|---|---|---|---|
| 1st place, gold medalist(s) | 1 | Johanna Hagström | Sweden | 3:19.55 | — | |
| 2nd place, silver medalist(s) | 2 | Yuliya Petrova | Russia | 3:21.95 | +2.40 | |
| 3rd place, bronze medalist(s) | 6 | Martine Engebretsen | Norway | 3:22.82 | +3.27 | |
| 4 | 5 | Moa Lundgren | Sweden | 3:25.99 | +6.44 | |
| 5 | 7 | Laura Chamiot-Maitral | France | 3:28.39 | +8.84 | |
| 6 | 13 | Hannah Halvorsen | United States | 3:33.20 | +13.65 | |
