= Cross-country skiing at the 2016 Winter Youth Olympics – Girls' cross-country cross =

Girls' cross-country cross at the II Winter Youth Olympic Games
- Venue: Birkebeineren Ski Stadium
- Date: 13 February
- Competitors: 40 from 32 nations

Medalists
1st place, gold medalist(s)		Moa Lundgren	Sweden
2nd place, silver medalist(s)		Johanna Hagström	Sweden
3rd place, bronze medalist(s)		Laura Chamiot-Maitral	France

The girls' cross-country cross freestyle cross-country skiing competition at the 2016 Winter Youth Olympics was held on 13 February at the Birkebeineren Ski Stadium. The distance was 1.26km.

== Results ==
=== Qualifying ===
The qualifying was held at 09:30.

Rank	Bib	Athlete	Country	Time	Deficit	Note
1	3	Moa Lundgren	Sweden	3:27.59	–	Q
2	7	Johanna Hagström	Sweden	3:31.35	+3.76	Q
3	6	Laura Chamiot-Maitral	France	3:33.69	+6.10	Q
4	5	Anna-Maria Dietze	Germany	3:34.48	+6.89	Q
5	2	Maya Yakunina	Russia	3:37.72	+10.13	Q
6	14	Martine Engebretsen	Norway	3:38.10	+10.51	Q
7	8	Juliette Ducordeau	France	3:40.31	+12.72	Q
8	39	Barbora Havlíčková	Czech Republic	3:43.60	+16.01	Q
9	1	Yuliya Petrova	Russia	3:43.94	+16.35	Q
10	4	Hannah Halvorsen	United States	3:44.04	+16.45	Q
11	11	Rebecca Immonen	Finland	3:44.48	+16.89	Q
12	13	Nora Ulvang	Norway	3:44.85	+17.26	Q
13	17	Chiara De Zolt Ponte	Italy	3:45.38	+17.79	Q
14	15	Désirée Steiner	Switzerland	3:47.31	+19.72	Q
15	26	Chi Chunxue	China	3:47.85	+20.26	Q
16	9	Anzhelika Tarassova	Kazakhstan	3:47.95	+20.36	Q
17	24	Roosa Niemi	Finland	3:48.64	+21.05	Q
18	12	Anja Mandeljc	Slovenia	3:48.72	+21.13	Q
19	38	Anna Juppe	Austria	3:49.03	+21.44	Q
20	19	Hanna Karaliova	Belarus	3:49.58	+21.99	Q
21	29	Hikari Miyazaki	Japan	3:52.03	+24.44	Q
22	10	Stine-Lise Truu	Estonia	3:52.30	+24.71	Q
23	35	Lillian Boland	Australia	3:52.64	+25.05	Q
24	21	Nina Klemenčič	Slovenia	3:53.82	+26.23	Q
25	16	Annika Richardson	Canada	3:53.88	+26.29	Q
26	30	Klaudia Kołodziej	Poland	3:56.29	+28.70	Q
27	18	Giuliana Werro	Switzerland	3:57.09	+29.50	Q
28	34	Yuliia Krol	Ukraine	3:59.85	+32.26	Q
29	33	Celine Mayer	Germany	4:00.39	+32.80	Q
30	28	Gabrijela Skender	Croatia	4:03.71	+36.12	Q
31	22	Nicoleta Luciana Sovarschi	Romania	4:05.87	+38.28	
32	40	Nansi Okoro	Bulgaria	4:06.80	+39.21	
33	23	Zuzana Šefčíková	Slovakia	4:07.26	+39.67	
34	36	Güllü Akalın	Turkey	4:08.01	+40.42	
35	25	Je Sang-mi	South Korea	4:09.03	+41.44	
36	20	Alba Puigdefabregas	Spain	4:11.78	+44.19	
37	31	Patrīcija Eiduka	Latvia	4:12.10	+44.51	
38	27	Anja Ilić	Serbia	4:12.89	+45.30	
39	32	Katarina Bogdanović	Bosnia and Herzegovina	4:17.15	+49.56	
40	37	Carola Vila Obiols	Andorra	4:20.25	+52.66	

=== Semifinals ===
Semifinal 1

Rank	Seed	Athlete	Country	Time	Deficit	Note
1	1	Moa Lundgren	Sweden	3:35.11	–	Q
2	6	Martine Engebretsen	Norway	3:39.31	+4.20	Q
3	12	Chiara De Zolt Ponte	Italy	3:39.46	+4.35	
4	7	Juliette Ducordeau	France	3:39.93	+4.82	
5	12	Nora Ulvang	Norway	3:40.21	+5.10	
6	18	Anja Mandeljc	Slovenia	3:40.69	+5.58	
7	19	Anna Juppe	Austria	3:46.11	+11.00	
8	24	Nina Klemenčič	Slovenia	3:54.43	+19.32	
9	25	Annika Richardson	Canada	3:54.86	+19.75	
10	30	Gabrijela Skender	Croatia	4:01.13	+26.02	

Semifinal 2

Rank	Seed	Athlete	Country	Time	Deficit	Note
1	2	Johanna Hagström	Sweden	3:33.90	–	Q
2	5	Maya Yakunina	Russia	3:34.31	+0.41	Q
3	11	Rebecca Immonen	Finland	3:34.97	+1.07	LL
4	8	Barbora Havlíčková	Czech Republic	3:36.59	+2.69	LL
5	14	Désirée Steiner	Switzerland	3:41.81	+7.91	
6	17	Roosa Niemi	Finland	3:42.13	+8.23	
7	20	Hanna Karaliova	Belarus	3:46.02	+12.12	
8	26	Klaudia Kołodziej	Poland	3:48.39	+14.49	
9	29	Celine Mayer	Germany	3:49.17	+15.27	
10	23	Lillian Boland	Australia	3:50.78	+16.88	

Semifinal 3

Rank	Seed	Athlete	Country	Time	Deficit	Note
1	3	Laura Chamiot-Maitral	France	3:36.21	–	Q
2	4	Anna-Maria Dietze	Germany	3:36.73	+0.52	Q
3	15	Chi Chunxue	China	3:38.10	+1.89	LL
4	9	Yuliya Petrova	Russia	3:38.17	+1.96	LL
5	10	Hannah Halvorsen	United States	3:39.91	+3.70	
6	21	Hikari Miyazaki	Japan	3:45.82	+9.61	
7	16	Anzhelika Tarassova	Kazakhstan	3:48.55	+12.34	
8	28	Yuliia Krol	Ukraine	3:52.10	+15.89	
9	22	Stine-Lise Truu	Estonia	3:52.58	+16.37	
10	27	Giuliana Werro	Switzerland	3:52.99	+16.78	

=== Final ===
The final was held at 11:57.

Rank	Seed	Athlete	Country	Time	Deficit	Note
1st place, gold medalist(s)	1	Moa Lundgren	Sweden	3:26.35	–	
2nd place, silver medalist(s)	2	Johanna Hagström	Sweden	3:28.09	+1.74	
3rd place, bronze medalist(s)	3	Laura Chamiot-Maitral	France	3:29.56	+3.21	
4	4	Anna-Maria Dietze	Germany	3:29.72	+3.37	
5	6	Martine Engebretsen	Norway	3:32.48	+6.13	
6	5	Maya Yakunina	Russia	3:32.72	+6.37	
7	11	Rebecca Immonen	Finland	3:37.38	+11.03	
8	8	Barbora Havlíčková	Czech Republic	3:38.87	+12.52	
9	15	Chi Chunxue	China	3:39.10	+12.75	
10	9	Yuliya Petrova	Russia	3:42.46	+16.11	
