= Liechtenstein at the 2012 Winter Youth Olympics =

- IOC code: LIE
- NOC: Liechtensteinischer Olympischer Sportverband
- Website: www.losv.li (in German and English)

in Innsbruck
- Competitors: 2 in 2 sports
- Flag bearer: Martin Vögeli
- Medals: Gold 0 Silver 0 Bronze 0 Total 0

Winter Youth Olympics appearances
- 2012; 2016; 2020; 2024

Liechtenstein competed at the 2012 Winter Youth Olympics in Innsbruck, Austria. The Liechtenstein team was made up of two male athletes, in two sports.

== Alpine skiing ==
Liechtenstein qualified one boy in alpine skiing.

Boy

Athlete	Event	Final			
Athlete	Event	Run 1	Run 2	Total	Rank
Manuel Hug	Slalom	42.94	45.04	1:27.98	22
Manuel Hug	Giant slalom	1:00.44	57.16	1:57.60	18
Manuel Hug	Super-G			DNF	
Manuel Hug	Combined	1:06.52	39.27	1:45.79	17

== Cross country skiing ==
Liechtenstein qualified one boy athlete.

Boy

Athlete	Event	Final	
Athlete	Event	Time	Rank
Martin Vögeli	10km classical	33:20.5	31

Sprint

Athlete	Event	Qualification		Quarterfinal		Semifinal		Final	
Athlete	Event	Total	Rank	Total	Rank	Total	Rank	Total	Rank
Martin Vögeli	Boys' sprint	1:56.31	39	did not advance					

== See also ==
- Liechtenstein at the 2012 Summer Olympics
