= Andorra at the Youth Olympics =

Performance of Andorra at the Youth Olympic Games

- IOC code: AND
- NOC: Andorran Olympic Committee
- Website: www.coa.ad (in Catalan)
- Medals Ranked 120th: Gold 0 Silver 0 Bronze 1 Total 1

Summer appearances
- 2010; 2014; 2018; 2026

Winter appearances
- 2012; 2016; 2020; 2024

Andorra has participated at the Youth Olympic Games in every edition since the inaugural 2010 Games.

== Medal tables ==
=== Medals by Summer Games ===
Games	Athletes	Gold	Silver	Bronze	Total	Rank
2010 Singapore	4	0	0	0	0	-
(China) 2014 Nanjing	10	0	0	0	0	-
(Argentina) 2018 Buenos Aires	8	0	0	0	0	-
(Senegal) 2022 Dakar						
Total		0	0	0	0	-

=== Medals by Winter Games ===
Games	Athletes	Gold	Silver	Bronze	Total	Rank
(Austria) 2012 Innsbruck	4	0	0	1	1	29
(Norway) 2016 Lillehammer	2	0	0	0	0	-
(Switzerland) 2020 Lausanne	3	0	0	0	0	-
(South Korea) 2024 Gangwon						
Total		0	0	1	1	35

=== Medals by summer sport ===
Sport	Gold	Silver	Bronze	Total
Totals (0 entries)	0	0	0	0

=== Medals by winter sport ===
Sport	Gold	Silver	Bronze	Total
Alpine skiing	0	0	1	1
Totals (1 entries)	0	0	1	1

== List of medalists ==
=== Summer Games medalists as part of Mixed-NOCs Team ===
Medal	Name	Games	Sport	Event
Bronze	Patrik Ferreira Martins	2010 Singapore	Judo	Mixed team

=== Winter Games ===
Medal	Name	Games	Sport	Event
Bronze	Joan Verdu Sanchez	(Austria) 2012 Innsbruck	Alpine skiing	Boy's super-G

== Flag bearers ==
#	Games	Season	Flag bearer	Sport
6	2020 Lausanne	Winter	Oriol Olm	Ski mountaineering
5	2018 Buenos Aires	Summer	Carla Solana Perez	Basketball
4	2016 Lillehammer	Winter		
3	2014 Nanjing	Summer	Laura Navarro Marin	Basketball
2	2012 Innsbruck	Winter	Sara Ramentol	Alpine skiing
1	2010 Singapore	Summer	Monica Ramirez Abella	Swimming

== See also ==
- Andorra at the Olympics
- Andorra at the Paralympics
