= Bobsleigh at the 2016 Winter Youth Olympics =

Bobsleigh at the II Winter Youth Olympic Games
- Venue: Lillehammer Olympic Bobsleigh and Luge Track
- Dates: 20 February
- Competitors: 30

Bobsleigh at the 2016 Winter Youth Olympics was held at the Lillehammer Olympic Bobsleigh and Luge Track in Lillehammer, Norway on 20 February. The competition had a Men's and a Women's monobob event.

== Medal summary ==
=== Medal table ===
* Host nation (Norway)

Rank	Nation	Gold	Silver	Bronze	Total
1	Germany	2	0	0	2
2	Austria	0	1	0	1
2	Russia	0	1	0	1
4	Great Britain	0	0	1	1
4	Norway*	0	0	1	1
Totals (5 entries)		2	2	2	6

=== Events ===
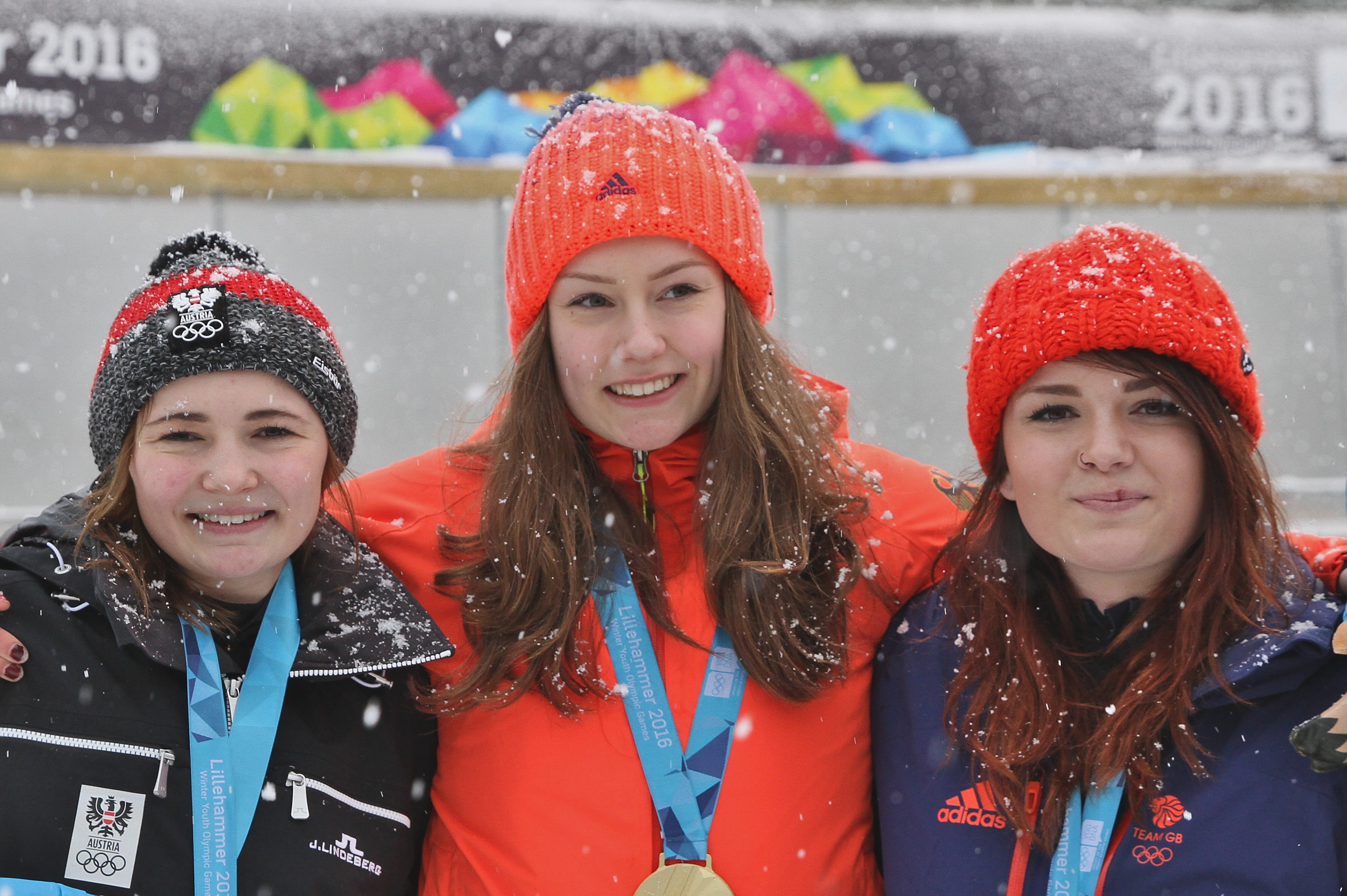
Girls monobob medalists

Event	Gold		Silver		Bronze	
Boys' monobob	Jonas Jannusch; Germany	1:54.29	Maksim Ivanov; Russia	1:54.44	Kristian Olsen; Norway	1:54.53
Girls' monobob	Laura Nolte; Germany	1:57.41	Mercedes Schulte; Austria	1:57.65	Kelsea Purchall; Great Britain	1:57.67

== Qualification system ==
Each nation could send a maximum of 6 athletes (3 boys and 3 girls). The FIBT ranking were used to allocate places to NOC's. Participation, for each of the men's and women's competitions, was limited to a total of 15 athletes each, including the host nation. The NOC quotas were based on the updated FIBT ranking. Qualification was achieved by the results of athletes, who gained a qualification place for their NOC. Male and female athletes of non represented continents also participated, with 1 male and 1 female athlete, provided that the maximum quota of 15 men and 15 women was not yet filled. Athletes must also meet eligibility criteria, which is explained in detail in the qualification system.

=== Quota allocation ===
Quota allocation according to the world rankings.

Event	Total	Qualified Boys'	Qualified Girls'
Host nation	1	Norway	~~Norway~~
World Rankings	14	Austria; Brazil; Canada; Germany; Great Britain; Jamaica; Liechtenstein; Romania; Russia; Slovakia; South Korea; Spain; Switzerland; United States	Austria; Brazil; Canada; Canada; Canada; Croatia; Germany; Germany; Great Britain; Great Britain; Great Britain; Romania; Russia; Russia; Switzerland; ~~United States~~
TOTAL		15	15

=== Qualification summary ===
NOC	Boys	Girls	Total
Austria	1	1	2
Brazil	1	1	2
Canada	1	3	4
Croatia		1	1
Germany	1	2	3
Great Britain	1	3	4
Jamaica	1		1
Liechtenstein	1		1
Norway	1		1
Romania	1	1	2
Russia	1	2	3
Slovakia	1		1
South Korea	1		1
Spain	1		1
Switzerland	1	1	2
United States	1		1
Total athletes	15	15	30
Total NOCs	15	9	16
