= Bobsleigh at the 2016 Winter Youth Olympics – Boys' monobob =

Boys' monobob at the II Winter Youth Olympic Games
- Venue: Lillehammer Olympic Bobsleigh and Luge Track
- Date: 20 February
- Competitors: 15 from 15 nations
- Winning time: 1:54.29

Medalists
1st place, gold medalist(s)		Jonas Jannusch	Germany
2nd place, silver medalist(s)		Maksim Ivanov	Russia
3rd place, bronze medalist(s)		Kristian Olsen	Norway

The boys' monobob competition of the bobsleigh events at the 2016 Winter Youth Olympics was held at the Lillehammer Olympic Bobsleigh and Luge Track, on 20 February. 15 athletes from 15 countries took part in this event.

== Results ==
The race was started at 14:00.

Rank	Start No.	Athlete	Country	Run 1	Rank 1	Run 2	Rank 2	Total	Behind
1st place, gold medalist(s)	5	Jonas Jannusch	Germany	57.15	2	57.14	2	1:54.29	
2nd place, silver medalist(s)	10	Maksim Ivanov	Russia	56.93	1	57.51	5	1:54.44	+0.15
3rd place, bronze medalist(s)	11	Kristian Olsen	Norway	57.43	5	57.10	1	1:54.53	+0.24
4	4	Mihai Cristian Tentea	Romania	57.42	4	57.20	3	1:54.62	+0.33
5	13	Marius Schneider	Switzerland	57.53	6	57.47	4	1:55.00	+0.71
6	15	George Johnston	Great Britain	57.31	3	58.17	9	1:55.48	+1.19
7	8	Gabriel Ospelt	Liechtenstein	57.84	7	57.76	6	1:55.60	+1.31
8	7	Marley Linhares	Brazil	57.86	8	58.00	7	1:55.86	+1.57
9	9	Leonhard Pichler	Austria	58.13	10	58.22	10	1:56.35	+2.06
10	6	Jakub Čiernik	Slovakia	58.37	12	58.14	8	1:56.51	+2.22
11	12	Kim Sang-min	South Korea	58.02	9	58.53	12	1:56.55	+2.26
12	2	Parker Reid	Canada	58.29	11	58.51	11	1:56.80	+2.51
13	14	Daniel Mayhew	Jamaica	58.85	13	58.62	13	1:57.47	+3.18
14	3	Samuel Beach	United States	59.02	14	59.32	15	1:58.34	+4.05
15	1	Martin Souto Otero	Spain	59.31	15	59.08	14	1:58.39	+4.10
