= Yuliya Krol =

Ukrainian cross country skier (born 1998)

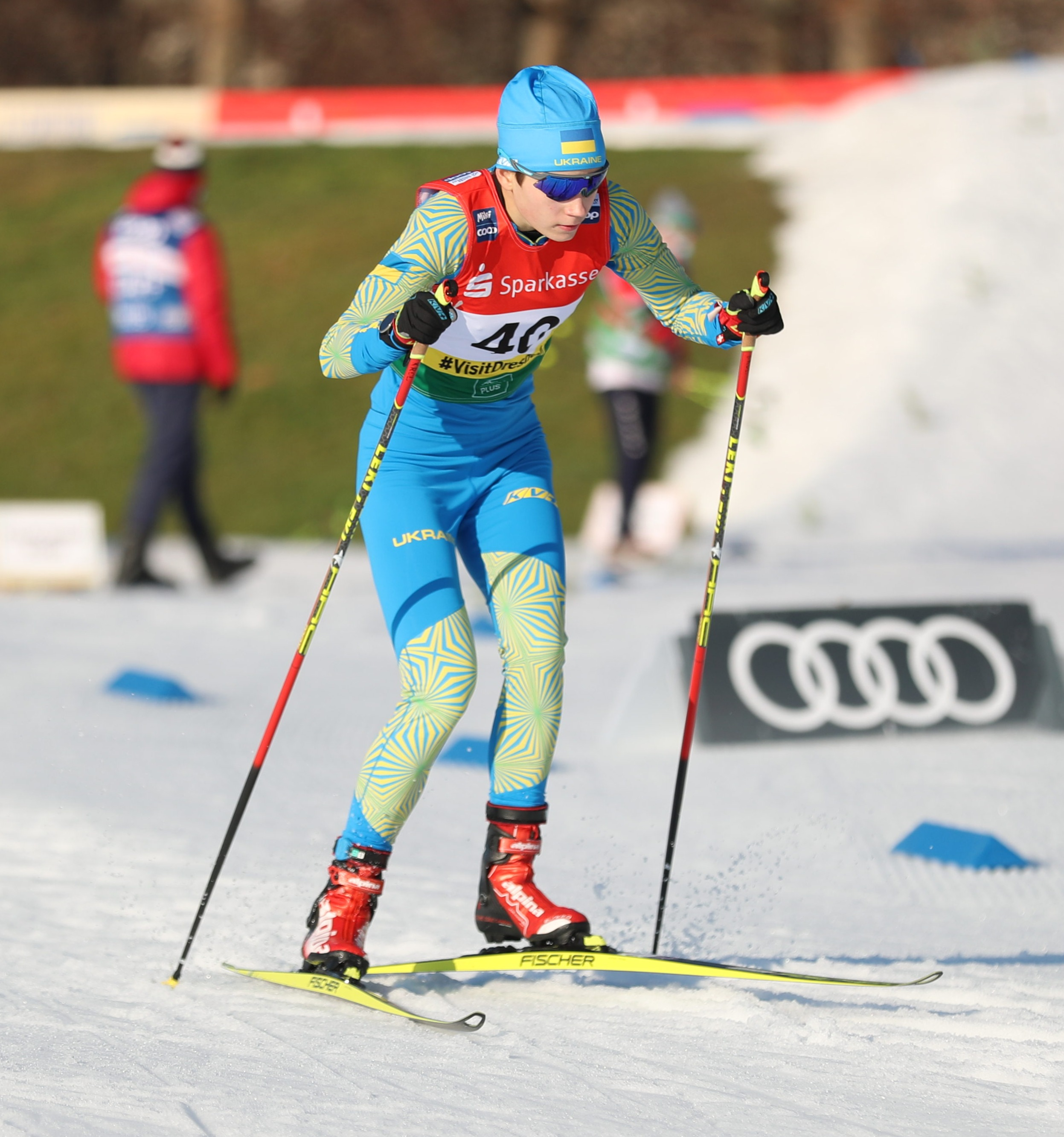
- Yuliya Krol on December 19, 2020, in Dresden

Personal information
- Full name: Yuliya Anatoliyivna Krol
- Nationality: Ukraine
- Born: 22 October 1998 (age 27)
- Height: 1.70 m (5 ft 7 in)

Sport
- Sport: Skiing
- Club: Dynamo

World Cup career
- Seasons: 5 – (2017, 2019–2022)
- Indiv. starts: 13
- Indiv. podiums: 0
- Team starts: 2
- Team podiums: 0
- Overall titles: 0
- Discipline titles: 0
- Updated on 8 January 2023

Yuliya Anatoliyivna Krol (Ukrainian: Юлія Анатоліївна Кроль, born 22 October 1998) is a Ukrainian cross country skier who has competed internationally since 2016.

== Career ==
Krol started her international career in 2016 when she participated at the 2016 Winter Youth Olympics in Norwegian Lillehammer. She finished 27th in 5 km freestyle race, 15th in sprint, and 28th in cross freestyle. She also took part in three FIS Nordic Junior World Ski Championships between 2016 and 2018 (with her best personal result being 30th in 5 km classical race in Swiss Goms in 2018) as well as two U23 World Ski Championships in 2019 and 2020 (with her best personal result being 34th in sprint in Finnish Lahti in 2019).

She debuted at World Cup on February 18, 2017, in Estonian Otepää where she finished 65th in freestyle sprint. As of January 2022, Krol's best World Cup individual finish was 43rd in a freestyle sprint event in Dresden, Germany, on December 19, 2020, and best World Cup team finish was 24th in team sprint in Dresden, Germany, on January 12, 2020 (together with Kaminska).

In 2022, Yuliia Krol was nominated for her first Winter Games in Beijing.

She participated in three FIS Nordic World Ski Championships. Her best finish was 15th in team sprint in 2017 (together with Antypenko) while her best individual finish was 47th in the 30 km event in 2021.

== Cross-country skiing results ==
All results are sourced from the International Ski Federation (FIS).

=== Olympic Games ===
Year	Age	10 km individual	15 km skiathlon	30 km mass start	Sprint	4 × 5 km relay	Team sprint
2022	23	—	62	—	—	—	18

=== World Championships ===
Year	Age	10 km individual	15 km skiathlon	30 km mass start	Sprint	4 × 5 km relay	Team sprint
2017	18	64	—	—	70	16	15
2019	20	65	—	—	68	17	17
2021	22	71	51	47	60	13	—

=== World Cup ===
==== Season standings ====
Season	Age	Discipline standings				Ski Tour standings			
Season	Age	Overall	Distance	Sprint	U23	Nordic Opening	Tour de Ski	Ski Tour 2020	World Cup Final
2017	18	NC	—	NC	NC	—	—	—N/a	—
2019	20	NC	—	NC	NC	—	—	—N/a	—
2020	21	NC	NC	NC	NC	DNF	—	—	—N/a
2021	22	NC	NC	NC	NC	65	—	—N/a	—N/a
2022	23	NC	—	NC	—N/a	—N/a	—	—N/a	—N/a

== Personal life ==
She studied physical culture and sport at the Sumy State University.
