= Andorra at the 2016 Winter Youth Olympics =

- IOC code: AND
- NOC: Andorran Olympic Committee
- Website: www.coa.ad

in Lillehammer
- Competitors: 2 in 2 sports
- Medals: Gold 0 Silver 0 Bronze 0 Total 0

Winter Youth Olympics appearances (overview)
- 2012; 2016; 2020; 2024

Andorra competed at the 2016 Winter Youth Olympics in Lillehammer, Norway from 12 to 21 February 2016.

== Alpine skiing ==
Boys

Athlete	Event	Run 1		Run 2		Total	
Athlete	Event	Time	Rank	Time	Rank	Time	Rank
Albert Perez Fabrega	Slalom	51.95	18	52.19	21	1:44.14	18
Albert Perez Fabrega	Giant slalom	DNF		did not advance			
Albert Perez Fabrega	Super-G	—				1:13.44	26
Albert Perez Fabrega	Combined	1:14.84	31	Disqualified			

== Cross-country skiing ==
Girls

Athlete	Event	Qualification		Quarterfinal		Semifinal		Final	
Athlete	Event	Time	Rank	Time	Rank	Time	Rank	Time	Rank
Carola Vila Obiols	5 km freestyle	—						15:28.6	34
Carola Vila Obiols	Classical sprint	3:59.21	35	did not advance					
Carola Vila Obiols	Cross-country cross	4:20.25	40	—		did not advance			

== See also ==
- Andorra at the 2016 Summer Olympics
