= Andorra at the 2020 Winter Youth Olympics =

- IOC code: AND
- NOC: Andorran Olympic Committee
- Website: www.coa.ad

in Lausanne
- Competitors: 3 in 2 sports
- Flag bearer: Oriol Olm
- Medals: Gold 0 Silver 0 Bronze 0 Total 0

Winter Youth Olympics appearances (overview)
- 2012; 2016; 2020; 2024

Andorra competed at the 2020 Winter Youth Olympics in Lausanne, Switzerland from 9 to 22 January 2020.

== Alpine skiing ==
Boys

Athlete	Event	Run 1		Run 2		Total	
Athlete	Event	Time	Rank	Time	Rank	Time	Rank
Ty Acosta	Super-G	—				57.90	37
Ty Acosta	Combined	57.90	37	36.79	28	1:34.69	27
Ty Acosta	Giant slalom	1:06.14	22	1:06.77	23	2:12.91	22
Ty Acosta	Slalom	40.16	29	41.55	19	1:21.71	21

Girls

Athlete	Event	Run 1		Run 2		Total	
Athlete	Event	Time	Rank	Time	Rank	Time	Rank
Carla Mijarez	Super-G	—				59.12	29
Carla Mijarez	Combined	59.12	29	DSQ			
Carla Mijarez	Giant slalom	1:07.17	19	1:07.98	22	2:15.15	22
Carla Mijarez	Slalom	45.91	6	44.90	7	1:30.81	6

== Ski mountaineering ==
Boys

Athlete	Event	Time	Rank
Oriol Olm	Individual	DNF	

Sprint

Athlete	Event	Qualification		Quarterfinal		Semifinal		Final	
Athlete	Event	Time	Rank	Time	Rank	Time	Rank	Time	Rank
Oriol Olm	Boys' sprint	2:44.53	1	2:42.80	1 Q	2:45.46	5	Did not advance	

Mixed

Athlete	Event	Time	Rank
World 2 Yu Jingxuan (CHN); Liang Qifan (CHN); Suolang Quzhen (CHN); Oriol Olm (AND)	Mixed relay	39:20	7

== See also ==
- Andorra at the 2020 Summer Olympics
