= Croatia at the 2016 Winter Youth Olympics =

- IOC code: CRO
- NOC: Croatian Olympic Committee
- Website: www.hoo.hr

in Lillehammer
- Competitors: 7 in 5 sports
- Medals: Gold 0 Silver 0 Bronze 0 Total 0

Winter Youth Olympics appearances (overview)
- 2012; 2016; 2020; 2024

Croatia competed at the 2016 Winter Youth Olympics in Lillehammer, Norway from 12 to 21 February 2016.

== Alpine skiing ==
Boys

Athlete	Event	Run 1		Run 2		Total	
Athlete	Event	Time	Rank	Time	Rank	Time	Rank
Samuel Kolega	Slalom	50.45	5	49.69	3	1:40.14	4
Samuel Kolega	Giant slalom	1:19.43	9	1:18.49	6	2:37.92	5
Samuel Kolega	Super-G	—N/a				DNF	
Samuel Kolega	Combined	1:14.42	26	41.57	5	1:55.99	13

Girls

Athlete	Event	Run 1		Run 2		Total	
Athlete	Event	Time	Rank	Time	Rank	Time	Rank
Lana Zbašnik	Slalom	DSQ		did not advance			
Lana Zbašnik	Giant slalom	1:19.89	9	1:16.92	13	2:36.81	12
Lana Zbašnik	Super-G	—N/a				DNF	
Lana Zbašnik	Combined	1:17.66	20	45.22	14	2:02.88	12

Parallel mixed team

Athletes	Event	Round of 16	Quarterfinals	Semifinals	Final / BM	
Athletes	Event	Opposition Score	Opposition Score	Opposition Score	Opposition Score	Rank
Lana Zbasnik; Samuel Kolega	Parallel mixed team	Slovenia; L 2 – 2^{+}	did not advance			

== Biathlon ==
Croatia qualified one boy.

Boys

Athlete	Event	Final		
Athlete	Event	Time	Misses	Rank
Mislav Petrović	Sprint	22:42.9	5	42
Mislav Petrović	Pursuit	36:21.2	5	43

== Bobsleigh ==
Croatia sent one athlete to compete in the monobob bobsled event.

Girls

Athlete	Event	Final			
Athlete	Event	Run 1	Run 2	Total	Rank
Karla Šola	Monobob	1:00.87	1:00.28	2:01.15	15

== Cross country skiing ==
Croatia qualified a team of one boy and one girl.

Boy

Athlete	Event	Final	
Athlete	Event	Time	Rank
Jakov Hladika	10 km free	29:24.7	46

Girl

Athlete	Event	Final	
Athlete	Event	Time	Rank
Gabrijela Skender	5 km free	15:47.5	36

Cross

Athlete	Event	Qualification		Semifinal		Final	
Athlete	Event	Total	Rank	Total	Rank	Total	Rank
Jakov Hladika	Boys' cross	3:41.87	47	did not advance			
Gabrijela Skender	Girls' cross	4:03.71	30 Q	4:01.13	10	did not advance	

Sprint

Athlete	Event	Qualification		Quarterfinal		Semifinal		Final	
Athlete	Event	Total	Rank	Total	Rank	Total	Rank	Total	Rank
Jakov Hladika	Boys' sprint	3:21.12	37	did not advance					
Gabrijela Skender	Girls' sprint	3:37.72	12 Q	3:32.32	2 Q	3:36.19	6	did not advance	

== Snowboarding ==
Slopestyle

Athlete	Event	Final			
Athlete	Event	Run 1	Run 2	Best	Rank
Tino Stojak	Boys' slopestyle	38.75	20.00	38.75	17

== See also ==
- Croatia at the 2016 Summer Olympics
