= Andorra at the 2024 Winter Youth Olympics =

- Flag of Andorra
- IOC code: AND
- NOC: Andorran Olympic Committee

in Gangwon, South Korea 19 January 2024 – 1 February 2024
- Competitors: 1 in 1 sport
- Flag bearer (opening): Salvador Cornella Guitart
- Flag bearer (closing): TBD
- Medals: Gold 0 Silver 0 Bronze 0 Total 0

Winter Youth Olympics appearances (overview)
- 2012; 2016; 2020; 2024

Andorra is scheduled to compete at the 2024 Winter Youth Olympics in Gangwon, South Korea, from 19 January to 1 February 2024, This will be Andorra's fourth appearance at the Winter Youth Olympic Games, having competed at every Games since the inaugural edition in 2012.

Andorra's team consisted of one male alpine skier. Alpine skier Salvador Cornella Guitart was the country's flagbearer during the opening ceremony.

== Competitors ==
The following is the list of number of competitors (per gender) participating at the games per sport/discipline.

Sport	Men	Women	Total
Alpine skiing	1	0	1
Total	1	0	1

== Alpine skiing ==
Andorra qualified one male alpine skier.

Men

Athlete	Event	Run 1		Run 2		Total	
Athlete	Event	Time	Rank	Time	Rank	Time	Rank
Salvador Cornella Guitart	Super-G	—N/a				56.58	30
Salvador Cornella Guitart	Giant slalom	52.85	40	48.78	32	1:41.63	31
Salvador Cornella Guitart	Slalom	49.77	28	DNF			
Salvador Cornella Guitart	Combined	56.48	29	56.45	18	1:52.93	23

== See also ==
- Andorra at the 2024 Summer Olympics
