= Bobsleigh at the 2020 Winter Youth Olympics – Boys' monobob =

Boys' monobob at the III Winter Youth Olympic Games
- Venue: St. Moritz-Celerina Olympic Bobrun
- Dates: 20 January
- Competitors: 18 from 18 nations
- Winning time: 2:24.80

Medalists
1st place, gold medalist(s)		Alexander Czudaj	Germany
1st place, gold medalist(s)		Andrei Nica	Romania
3rd place, bronze medalist(s)		Quentin Sanzo	Liechtenstein

The boys' monobob competition at the 2020 Winter Youth Olympics took place on 20 January at the St. Moritz-Celerina Olympic Bobrun.

== Results ==
The first run was held at 12:00 and the second run at 13:15.

Rank	Start No.	Athlete	Country	Run 1	Rank 1	Run 2	Rank 2	Total	Behind
1st place, gold medalist(s)	4	Alexander Czudaj	Germany	1:12.43	1	1:12.37	5	2:24.80	
1st place, gold medalist(s)	7	Andrei Nica	Romania	1:12.81	2	1:11.99	1	2:24.80	
3rd place, bronze medalist(s)	9	Quentin Sanzo	Liechtenstein	1:13.01	3	1:12.17	3	2:25.18	+0.38
4	1	Nathan Besnard	France	1:13.23	4	1:12.07	2	2:25.30	+0.50
5	13	Pavel Zhichkin	Russia	1:13.82	9	1:12.59	6	2:26.41	+1.61
6	2	Kim Ji-min	South Korea	1:13.66	7	1:12.87	7	2:26.53	+1.73
7	3	Fabian Gisler	Switzerland	1:14.30	12	1:12.29	4	2:26.59	+1.79
8	14	Renārs Grantiņs	Latvia	1:13.44	5	1:13.33	10	2:26.77	+1.97
9	6	Bridger Stone	United States	1:13.47	6	1:13.33	10	2:26.80	+2.00
10	17	Martin Sviták	Slovakia	1:13.67	8	1:13.15	8	2:26.82	+2.02
11	15	Oskar Langowski	Poland	1:13.89	10	1:13.16	9	2:27.05	+2.25
12	16	William Scammell	Great Britain	1:14.24	11	1:14.02	12	2:28.26	+3.46
13	8	Gustavo Ferreira	Brazil	1:14.33	13	1:14.62	13	2:28.95	+4.15
14	12	Theodor Lööv von Hage	Sweden	1:15.02	15	1:15.20	16	2:30.22	+5.42
15	11	Toni Nimac	Croatia	1:15.27	16	1:15.12	14	2:30.39	+5.59
16	18	Marco Farina	Italy	1:14.76	14	1:15.65	18	2:30.41	+5.61
17	10	Colton Dagenais	Canada	1:15.67	17	1:15.14	15	2:30.81	+6.01
18	5	Chen Yu-lun	Chinese Taipei	1:15.68	18	1:15.31	17	2:30.99	+6.19
