= Liechtenstein at the 2024 Winter Youth Olympics =

- Flag of Liechtenstein
- IOC code: LIE
- NOC: Liechtenstein Olympic Committee

in Gangwon, South Korea 19 January 2024 – 1 February 2024
- Competitors: 2 in 2 sports
- Flag bearer (opening): Noah Gianesini
- Flag bearer (closing): TBD
- Medals: Gold 0 Silver 0 Bronze 0 Total 0

Winter Youth Olympics appearances
- 2012; 2016; 2020; 2024

Liechtenstein competed at the 2024 Winter Youth Olympics in Gangwon, South Korea, from January 19 to February 1, 2024. This will be Liechtenstein's fourth appearance at the Winter Youth Olympic Games, having competed at every Games since the inaugural edition in 2012.

The Liechtenstein team consisted of two male athletes competing in two sports. Alpine skier Noah Gianesini was the country's flagbearer during the opening ceremony.

== Competitors ==
The following is the list of number of competitors (per gender) participating at the games per sport/discipline.

Sport	Men	Women	Total
Alpine skiing	1	0	1
Cross-country skiing	1	0	1
Total	2	0	2

== Alpine skiing ==
Liechtenstein qualified one male alpine skier.

Men

Athlete	Event	Run 1		Run 2		Total	
Athlete	Event	Time	Rank	Time	Rank	Time	Rank
Noah Gianesini	Super-G	—N/a				56.25	28
Noah Gianesini	Giant slalom	51.47	25	46.18	7	1:47.65	15
Noah Gianesini	Slalom	49.98	30	54.28	17	1:44.26	16
Noah Gianesini	Combined	56.39	28	Did not finish			

== Cross-country skiing ==
Liechtenstein qualified one male cross-country skier.

Men

Athlete	Event	Qualification		Quarterfinal		Semifinal		Final	
Athlete	Event	Time	Rank	Time	Rank	Time	Rank	Time	Rank
Janik Brunhart	7.5 km classical	—N/a						22:40.3	46
Janik Brunhart	Sprint freestyle	3:24.61	49	Did not advance					

== See also ==
- Liechtenstein at the 2024 Summer Olympics
