= Liechtenstein at the 2016 Winter Youth Olympics =

- IOC code: LIE
- NOC: Liechtensteinischer Olympischer Sportverband
- Website: www.losv.li (in German and English)

in Lillehammer
- Competitors: 2 in 2 sports
- Medals: Gold 0 Silver 0 Bronze 0 Total 0

Winter Youth Olympics appearances
- 2012; 2016; 2020; 2024

Liechtenstein competed at the 2016 Winter Youth Olympics in Lillehammer, Norway from 12 to 21 February 2016. The team consisted of two male athletes in two sports (alpine skiing and bobsleigh).

== Competitors ==
Sport	Men	Women	Total
Alpine skiing	1		1
Bobsleigh	1		1
Total	2		2

== Alpine skiing ==
Liechtenstein qualified one boy.

Boys

Athlete	Event	Run 1		Run 2		Total	
Athlete	Event	Time	Rank	Time	Rank	Time	Rank
Silvan Marxer	Slalom	DNF		did not advance			
Silvan Marxer	Giant slalom	1:22.41	26	1:20.66	18	2:43.07	21
Silvan Marxer	Super-G	—				1:13.94	28
Silvan Marxer	Combined	DNF		did not advance			

== Bobsleigh ==
Liechtenstein qualified one boy.

Athlete	Event	Run 1		Run 2		Total	
Athlete	Event	Time	Rank	Time	Rank	Time	Rank
Gabriel Ospelt	Boys'	57.84	7	57.76	6	1:55.60	7

== See also ==
- Liechtenstein at the 2016 Summer Olympics
