= Bobsleigh at the 2020 Winter Youth Olympics =

Bobsleigh at the III Winter Youth Olympic Games
- Venue: St. Moritz-Celerina Olympic Bobrun
- Dates: 19–20 January
- Competitors: 36 from 20 nations

Bobsleigh at the 2020 Winter Youth Olympics took place at the St. Moritz-Celerina Olympic Bobrun from 19 to 20 January 2020.

== Medal summary ==
=== Medal table ===
Rank	Nation	Gold	Silver	Bronze	Total
1	Romania	2	0	0	2
2	Germany	1	0	1	2
3	Slovakia	0	1	0	1
4	Liechtenstein	0	0	1	1
Totals (4 entries)		3	1	2	6

=== Events ===
Event	Gold		Silver		Bronze	
Boys' monobob	Alexander Czudaj; Germany Andrei Nica; Romania	2:24.80	Not awarded		Quentin Sanzo; Liechtenstein	2:25.18
Girls' monobob	Georgeta Popescu; Romania	2:26.84	Viktória Čerňanská; Slovakia	2:27.35	Celine Harms; Germany	2:27.36

== Qualification ==
A total of 36 bobsledders will qualify to compete (18 per gender). A NOC can enter a maximum of three athletes per gender. Quotas were officially awarded via the IBSF Youth World Ranking List as of 9 December 2019.

=== Summary ===
NOC	Boys	Girls	Total
Brazil	1		1
Canada	1	1	2
Colombia		1	1
Croatia	1		1
France	1	1	2
Germany	1	2	3
Great Britain	1	1	2
Italy	1		1
Latvia	1	1	2
Liechtenstein	1	1	2
Norway		1	1
Poland	1		1
Romania	1	2	3
Russia	1	1	2
Slovakia	1	1	2
South Korea	1	1	2
Sweden	1		1
Switzerland	1	2	3
Chinese Taipei	1	1	2
United States	1	1	2
Total: 20 NOCs	18	18	36
