= Jamaica at the 2016 Winter Youth Olympics =

- IOC code: JAM
- NOC: Jamaica Olympic Association

in Lillehammer
- Competitors: 1 in 1 sport
- Medals: Gold 0 Silver 0 Bronze 0 Total 0

Winter Youth Olympics appearances
- 2012; 2016; 2020; 2024

Jamaica competed at the 2016 Winter Youth Olympics in Lillehammer, Norway from 12 to 21 February 2016. The team will consist of one male athlete in Bobsleigh. The country will be making its Winter Youth Olympics debut.

== Competitors ==
Sport	Men	Women	Total
Bobsleigh	1		1
Total	1		1

== Bobsleigh ==
Jamaica qualified one boy.

Athlete	Event	Run 1		Run 2		Total	
Athlete	Event	Time	Rank	Time	Rank	Time	Rank
Daniel Mayhew	Boys'	58.85	13	58.62	13	1:57.47	13

== See also ==
- Jamaica at the 2016 Summer Olympics
