= Liechtenstein at the 2020 Winter Youth Olympics =

- IOC code: LIE
- NOC: Liechtenstein Olympic Committee
- Website: www.olympic.li

in Lausanne
- Competitors: 5 in 4 sports
- Flag bearer: Christina Buehler
- Medals: Gold 0 Silver 0 Bronze 1 Total 1

Winter Youth Olympics appearances
- 2012; 2016; 2020; 2024

Liechtenstein competed at the 2020 Winter Youth Olympics in Lausanne, Switzerland from 9 to 22 January 2020.

Liechtenstein won its first ever Youth Olympics medal when bobsledder Quentin Sanzo won bronze in the boys' monobob event.

== Medalists ==
Medals awarded to participants of mixed-NOC teams are represented in italics. These medals are not counted towards the individual NOC medal tally.

Medal	Name	Sport	Event	Date
Bronze	Quentin Sanzo	Bobsleigh	Boys' monobob	20 January

== Alpine skiing ==
Girls

Athlete	Event	Run 1		Run 2		Total	
Athlete	Event	Time	Rank	Time	Rank	Time	Rank
Christina Buehler	Super-G	—				58.52	25
Christina Buehler	Combined	58.52	25	39.81	17	1:38.33	19
Christina Buehler	Giant slalom	1:08.39	27	1:06.44	21	2:14.83	21
Christina Buehler	Slalom	50.77	32	47.96	22	1:38.73	23

== Bobsleigh ==
Athlete	Event	Run 1		Run 2		Total	
Athlete	Event	Time	Rank	Time	Rank	Time	Rank
Quentin Sanzo	Boys'	1:13.01	3	1:12.17	3	2:25.18	3rd place, bronze medalist(s)
Simone Zanghellini	Girls'	1:15.00	9	1:14.64	7	2:29.64	8

== Cross-country skiing ==
Boys

Athlete	Event	Qualification		Quarterfinal		Semifinal		Final	
Athlete	Event	Time	Rank	Time	Rank	Time	Rank	Time	Rank
Robin Frommelt	10 km classic	—						30:42.2	49
Robin Frommelt	Free sprint	3:34.10	46	did not advance					
Robin Frommelt	Cross-country cross	4:55.53	56	did not advance					

== Skeleton ==
Athlete	Event	Run 1		Run 2		Total	
Athlete	Event	Time	Rank	Time	Rank	Time	Rank
Katharina Eigenmann	Girls'	1:14.44	16	1:14.92	17	2:29.36	16

== See also ==
- Liechtenstein at the 2020 Summer Olympics
