= Spain at the 2016 Winter Youth Olympics =

- IOC code: ESP
- NOC: Spanish Olympic Committee
- Website: www.coe.es

in Lillehammer
- Competitors: 6 in 4 sports
- Medals: Gold 0 Silver 0 Bronze 0 Total 0

Winter Youth Olympics appearances (overview)
- 2012; 2016; 2020; 2024

Spain competed at the 2016 Winter Youth Olympics in Lillehammer, Norway from 12 to 21 February 2016.

== Alpine skiing ==
Boys

Athlete	Event	Run 1		Run 2		Total	
Athlete	Event	Time	Rank	Time	Rank	Time	Rank
Aingeru Garay	Slalom	51.64	14	51.32	14	1:42.96	13
Aingeru Garay	Giant slalom	DNF		did not advance			
Aingeru Garay	Super-G	—N/a				1:14.84	33
Aingeru Garay	Combined	1:14.58	29	42.78	14	1:57.36	18

Girls

Athlete	Event	Run 1		Run 2		Total	
Athlete	Event	Time	Rank	Time	Rank	Time	Rank
Mirentxu Miquel	Slalom	59.81	22	54.96	21	1:54.77	21
Mirentxu Miquel	Giant slalom	1:25.49	25	1:21.11	22	2:46.60	21
Mirentxu Miquel	Super-G	—N/a				1:20.75	32

== Bobsleigh ==
Athlete	Event	Run 1		Run 2		Total	
Athlete	Event	Time	Rank	Time	Rank	Time	Rank
Martin Souto Otero	Boys'	59.31	15	59.08	14	1:58.39	15

== Cross-country skiing ==
Boys

Athlete	Event	Qualification		Quarterfinal		Semifinal		Final	
Athlete	Event	Time	Rank	Time	Rank	Time	Rank	Time	Rank
Gral Selles	10 km freestyle	—N/a						27:32.8	37
Gral Selles	Classical sprint	3:21.26	38	did not advance					
Gral Selles	Cross-country cross	3:21.47	32	—N/a		did not advance			

Girls

Athlete	Event	Qualification		Quarterfinal		Semifinal		Final	
Athlete	Event	Time	Rank	Time	Rank	Time	Rank	Time	Rank
Alba Puigdefabregas	5 km freestyle	—N/a						15:16.2	30
Alba Puigdefabregas	Classical sprint	3:51.96	32	did not advance					
Alba Puigdefabregas	Cross-country cross	4:11.78	36	—N/a		did not advance			

== Snowboarding ==
Snowboard cross

Athlete	Event	Qualification		Group heats		Semifinal	Final
Athlete	Event	Time	Rank	Points	Rank	Position	Position
Fiona Torello	Girls' snowboard cross	53.69	9 Q	11	11	did not advance	

Snowboard and ski cross relay

Athlete	Event	Quarterfinal	Semifinal	Final
Athlete	Event	Position	Position	Position
Fiona Torello (ESP); Zoe Chore (CAN); Evan Bichon (CAN); Reece Howden (CAN)	Team snowboard ski cross	1 Q	1 FA	4

Qualification legend: FA – Qualify to medal round; FB – Qualify to consolation round

== See also ==
- Spain at the 2016 Summer Olympics
