= Martin Vögeli =

Liechtenstein cross-country skier (born 1995)

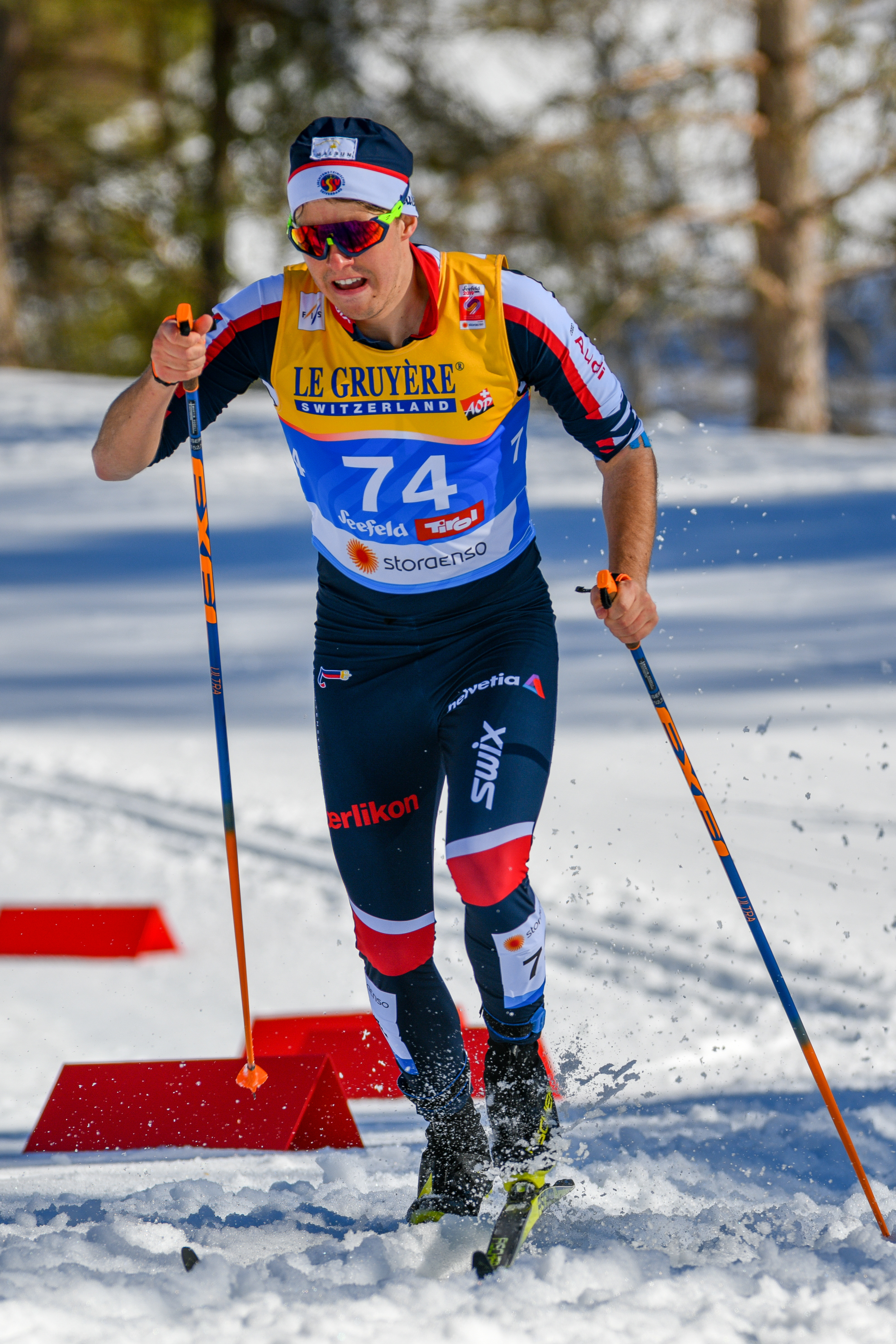

Personal information
- Born: 9 July 1995 (age 29)

Sport
- Country: Liechtenstein
- Sport: Cross-country skiing

Martin Vögeli (born 9 July 1995) is a Liechtensteiner cross-country skier who competes internationally.

He represented Liechtenstein at the 2018 Winter Olympics.
