= Serbia at the 2016 Winter Youth Olympics =

- IOC code: SRB
- NOC: Olympic Committee of Serbia
- Website: www.oks.org.rs

in Lillehammer
- Competitors: 3 in 2 sports
- Medals: Gold 0 Silver 0 Bronze 0 Total 0

Winter Youth Olympics appearances
- 2012; 2016; 2020; 2024

Serbia competed at the 2016 Winter Youth Olympics in Lillehammer, Norway from 12 to 21 February 2016. Serbia had three athletes competing in two different sports. They did not win any medals.

== Alpine skiing ==
Boys

Athlete	Event	Run 1		Run 2		Total	
Athlete	Event	Time	Rank	Time	Rank	Time	Rank
Rašo Jevremović	Slalom	53.01	27	52.21	22	1:45.22	23
Rašo Jevremović	Giant slalom	1:23.60	30	1:22.54	25	2:46.14	26
Rašo Jevremović	Super-G	—				1:14.46	30
Rašo Jevremović	Combined	DNF		did not advance			

Girls

Athlete	Event	Run 1		Run 2		Total	
Athlete	Event	Time	Rank	Time	Rank	Time	Rank
Milica Kovačević	Slalom	1:03.81	29	Disqualified			
Milica Kovačević	Giant slalom	DNF		did not advance			
Milica Kovačević	Super-G	—				1:21.54	33
Milica Kovačević	Combined	1:22.57	31	did not finish			

== Cross-country skiing ==
Girls

Athlete	Event	Qualification		Quarterfinal		Semifinal		Final	
Athlete	Event	Time	Rank	Time	Rank	Time	Rank	Time	Rank
Anja Ilić	5 km freestyle	—						15:36.5	35
Anja Ilić	Classical sprint	4:06.78	37	did not advance					
Anja Ilić	Cross-country cross	4:12.89	38	—		did not advance			

== See also ==
- Serbia at the 2016 Summer Olympics
