= Johanna Hagström =

Swedish cross-country skier (born 1998)

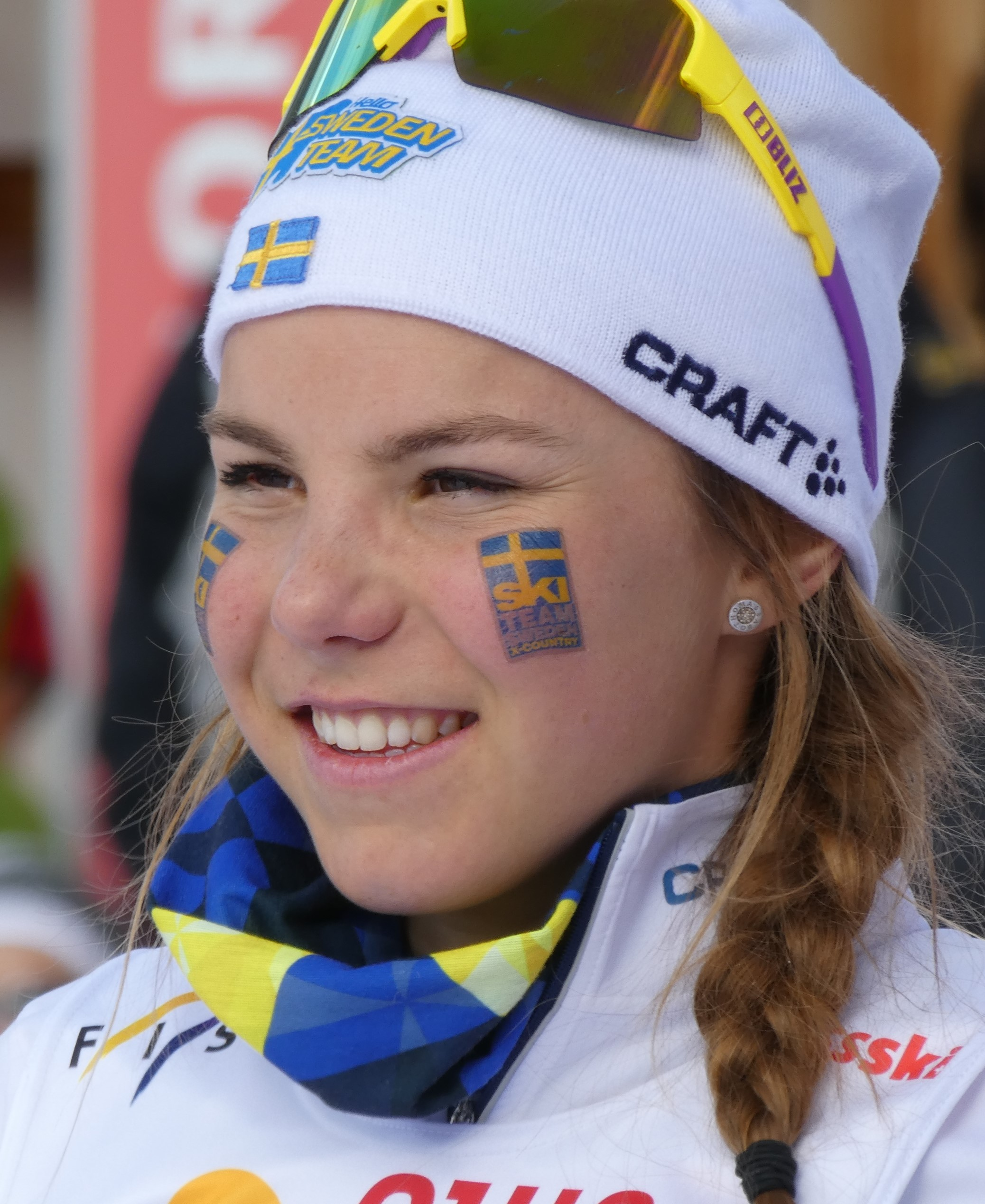
- Johanna Hagström in February 2018

Personal information
- Full name: Karin Johanna Hagström
- Nationality: Sweden
- Born: 27 March 1998 (age 28) Falköping, Sweden

Sport
- Sport: Skiing
- Club: Ulricehamns IF SK

World Cup career
- Seasons: 8 – (2017–present)
- Indiv. starts: 77
- Indiv. podiums: 9
- Indiv. wins: 2
- Team starts: 5
- Team podiums: 2
- Overall titles: 0 – (18th in 2023)
- Discipline titles: 0
Medal record
Women's cross-country skiing
Representing Sweden
U23 World Championships
| Silver medal – second place | 2020 Oberwiesenthal | Individual sprint |
Junior World Championships
| Bronze medal – third place | 2018 Goms | 4 × 3.33 km relay |
Winter Youth Olympics
| Gold medal – first place | 2016 Lillehammer | Individual sprint |
| Silver medal – second place | 2016 Lillehammer | Cross-country cross |
- Updated on 5 December 2025

Karin Johanna Hagström (born 27 March 1998) is a Swedish cross-country skier. Hagström made her World Cup debut in January 2017 and scored her first podium in Cogne, Italy, in February 2019, by finishing third in the freestyle sprint competition. In 2021, she participated in the World Championships in Oberstdorf, finishing fourth in the individual sprint. In 2026, she won Tjejvasan.

Her sister Sara Hagström is an orienteering competitor.

== Cross-country skiing results ==
All results are sourced from the International Ski Federation (FIS).

=== World Championships ===
| Year | Age | 10 km individual | 15 km skiathlon | 30 km mass start | Sprint | 4 × 5 km relay | Team sprint |
|---|---|---|---|---|---|---|---|
| 2021 | 22 | — | — | — | 4 | — | — |
| 2023 | 24 | — | — | — | 10 | — | — |
| 2025 | 26 | — | — | — | 11 | — | — |

=== World Cup ===
==== Season standings ====
| Season | Age | Discipline standings | | | | Ski Tour standings | | | |
| Season | Age | Overall | Distance | Sprint | U23 | Nordic Opening | Tour de Ski | Ski Tour 2020 | World Cup Final |
|---|---|---|---|---|---|---|---|---|---|
| 2017 | 18 | NC | NC | — | NC | — | — | —N/a | — |
| 2018 | 19 | NC | NC | NC | NC | — | — | —N/a | 58 |
| 2019 | 20 | 55 | NC | 29 | 8 | — | — | —N/a | — |
| 2020 | 21 | 51 | NC | 28 | 9 | — | — | — | —N/a |
| 2021 | 22 | 37 | 61 | 13 | 6 | — | — | —N/a | —N/a |
| 2022 | 23 | 19 | NC | 6 | —N/a | —N/a | 43 | —N/a | —N/a |
| 2023 | 24 | 18 | 58 | 4 | —N/a | —N/a | — | —N/a | —N/a |
| 2024 | 25 | 30 | 105 | 8 | —N/a | —N/a | DNF | —N/a | —N/a |
| 2025 | 26 | 33 | NC | 6 | —N/a | —N/a | DNF | —N/a | —N/a |
| 2026 | 27 | 15 | 71 | 2nd place, silver medalist(s) | —N/a | —N/a | 32 | —N/a | —N/a |

==== Individual podiums ====
- 2 victories – (1 WC)
- 10 podiums – (6 WC, 2 SWC)

| No. | Season | Date | Location | Race | Level | Place |
|---|---|---|---|---|---|---|
| 1 | 2018–19 | 16 February 2019 | Cogne, Italy | 1.6 km Sprint F | World Cup | 3rd |
| 2 | 2020–21 | 6 February 2021 | Ulricehamn, Sweden | 1.5 km Sprint F | World Cup | 2nd |
| 3 | 2021–22 | 26 November 2021 | Rukatunturi, Finland | 1.4 km Sprint C | World Cup | 2nd |
| 4 | 2021–22 | 1 January 2022 | Oberstdorf, Germany | 1.2 km Sprint C | Stage World Cup | 2nd |
| 5 | 2022–23 | 25 November 2022 | Rukatunturi, Finland | 1.4 km Sprint C | World Cup | 2nd |
| 6 | 2022–23 | 17 December 2022 | Davos, Switzerland | 1.5 km Sprint F | World Cup | 3rd |
| 7 | 2024–25 | 30 November 2024 | Rukatunturi, Finland | 1.4 km Sprint C | World Cup | 1st |
| 8 | 2024–25 | 7 December 2024 | Lillehammer, Norway | 1.4 km Sprint F | World Cup | 2nd |
| 9 | 2025–26 | 5 December 2025 | Trondheim, Norway | 1.4 km Sprint C | World Cup | 1st |
| 10 | 2025–26 | 3 January 2026 | Val di Fiemme, Italy | 1.2 km Sprint C | Stage World Cup | 3rd |

==== Team podiums ====
- 0 victory – (1 TS)
- 2 podiums – (2 TS)

| No. | Season | Date | Location | Race | Level | Place | Teammates |
|---|---|---|---|---|---|---|---|
| 1 | 2024–25 | 31 January 2025 | Cogne, Italy | 6 × 1.3 km Team Sprint C | World Cup | 2nd | Dahlqvist |
| 2 | 2024–25 | 22 March 2025 | (Finland) Lahti | 6 × 1.5 km Team Sprint F | World Cup | 2nd | Dahlqvist |
