= Andrei Nica =

Romanian bobsledder (born 2002)

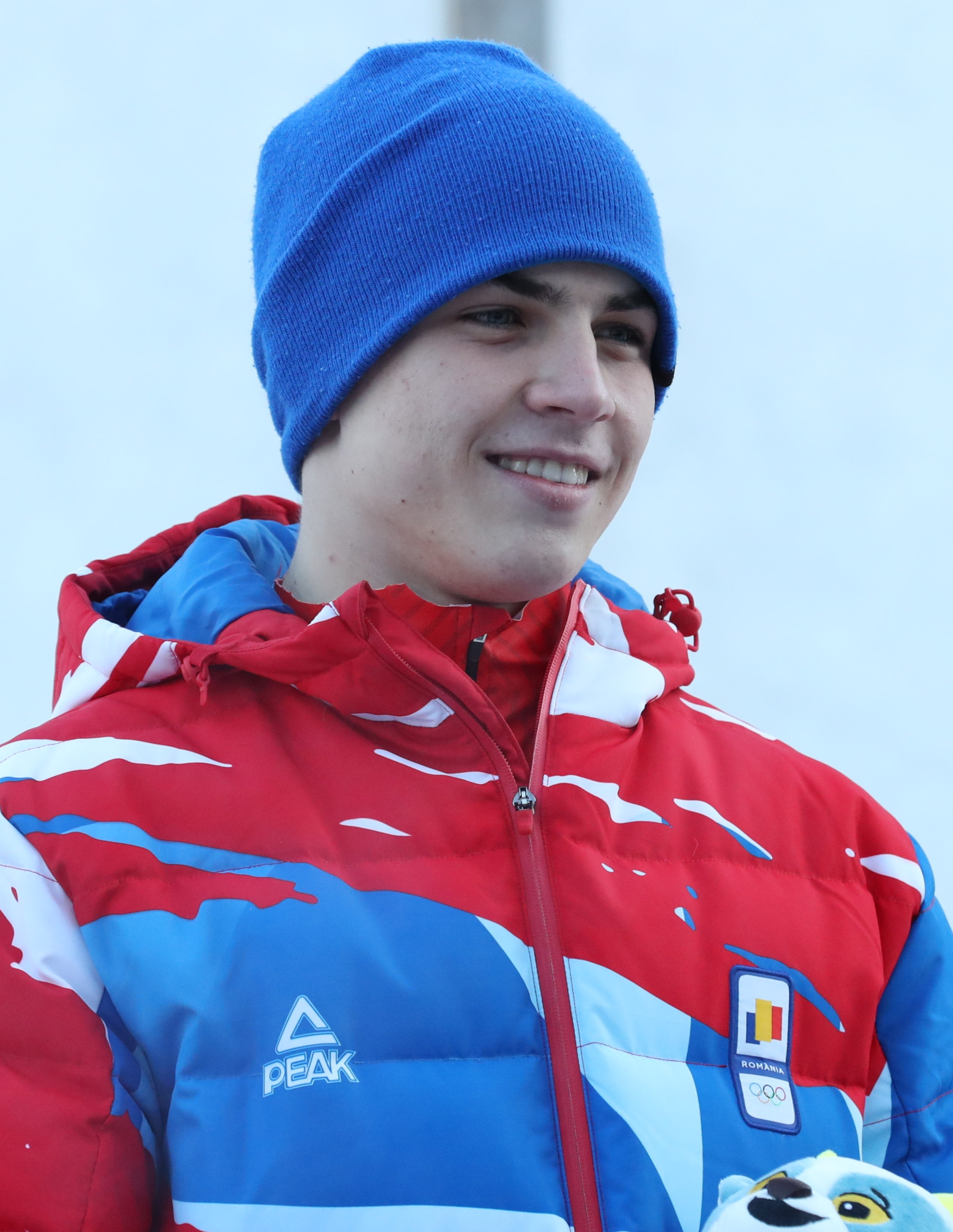
- Nica in 2020

Personal information
- Full name: Andrei Robert Nica
- Nationality: Romanian
- Born: 4 January 2002 (age 24) Buzău, Romania
- Height: 175 cm (5 ft 9 in)
- Weight: 75 kg (165 lb)

Sport
- Country: Romania
- Sport: Bobsleigh
- Events: Two-man, Four-man
Medal record
Men's bobsleigh
Representing Romania
Youth Olympic Games
Gold medal – first place	2020 Lausanne	monobob
Junior World Championships U23
Gold medal – first place	2024 St. Moritz	Four-man
Bronze medal – third place	2023 Winterberg	Two-man
Bronze medal – third place	2024 St. Moritz	Two-man
Bronze medal – third place	2025 Altenberg	Two-man
Junior European Championships U23
Bronze medal – third place	2022 Winterberg	Two-man
Bronze medal – third place	2023 Altenberg	Two-man
Bronze medal – third place	2024 Innsbruck	Four-man

Andrei Robert Nica (born 4 January 2002) is a Romanian bobsledder.

== Career ==
Nica began bobsledding in 2018 in the IBSF Youth Series. In 2020, he competed in boys' monobob at the Winter Youth Olympics, where he tied for the gold medal with Alexander Czudaj. In 2024, Nica won the Under-23 Junior Championship. He began regularly competing in the Bobsleigh World Cup beginning in 2025.

For the 2026 Winter Olympics, Nica was named as a reserve for the Romanian bobsleigh team. Nica was called up to fill in for George Iordache for the fourth run in the four-man, as is credited with a 17th-place finish with Mihai Tentea's team.

== Bobsleigh results ==
All results are sourced from the International Bobsleigh and Skeleton Federation (IBSF).

=== Olympic Games ===
Event	Four-man
(Italy) 2026 Milano Cortina	17th

=== World Championships ===
Event	Two-man
(Switzerland) 2023 St. Moritz	25th
