= Barbora Havlíčková =

Czech cross-country skier (born 2000)

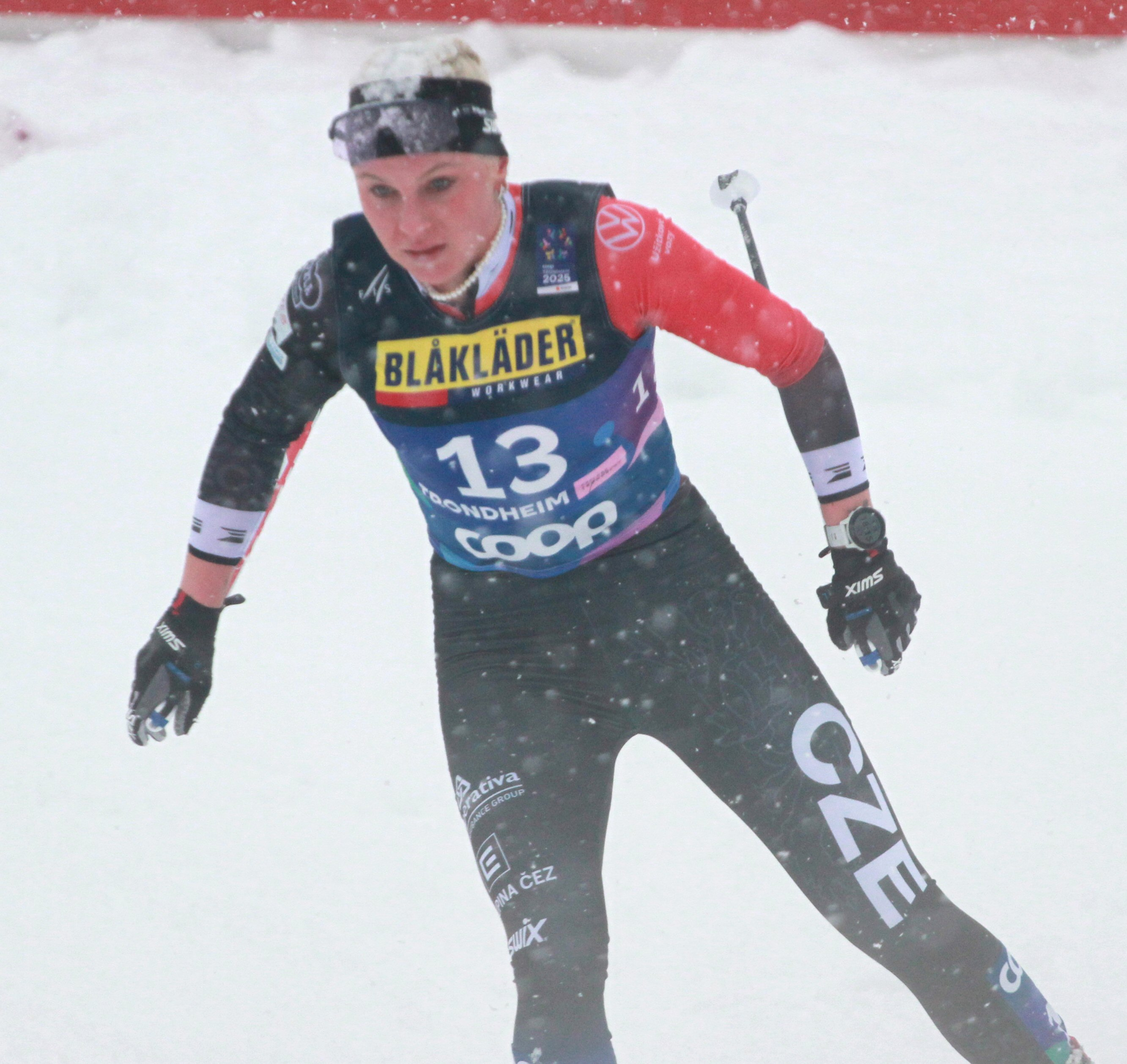
- Havlíčková at the FIS Nordic World Ski Championships 2025 in Trondheim, Norway

Personal information
- Nationality: Czech Republic
- Born: 12 May 2000 (age 26)

Sport
- Sport: Skiing
- Club: Dukla Liberec

World Cup career
- Seasons: 1 – (2020)
- Indiv. starts: 2
- Indiv. podiums: 0
- Team starts: 0
- Overall titles: 0
- Discipline titles: 0
- Updated on 20 January 2022

Barbora Havlíčková (born 12 May 2000) is a Czech cross-country skier. She competed at the 2018 and 2026 Winter Olympics.

== Cross-country skiing results ==
All results are sourced from the International Ski Federation (FIS).

=== Olympic Games ===
Year	Age	10 km individual	15 km skiathlon	30 km mass start	Sprint	4 × 5 km relay	Team sprint
2018	17	59	43	—	—	11	—
2026	25	55	39	24	—	—	—

=== World Championships ===
Year	Age	10 km individual	15 km skiathlon	30 km mass start	Sprint	4 × 5 km relay	Team sprint
2023	22	—	—	—	—	9	—

=== World Cup ===
==== Season standings ====
Season	Age	Discipline standings				Ski Tour standings		
Season	Age	Overall	Distance	Sprint	U23	Nordic Opening	Tour de Ski	Ski Tour 2020
2020	19	NC	NC	—	NC	—	—	—
