= Gabrijela Skender =

Croatian cross-country skier (born 1999)

Personal information
- Nationality: Croatian
- Born: 7 October 1999 (age 25)

Sport
- Sport: Cross-country skiing

Gabrijela Skender (Croatian pronunciation: [ɡabrijěla skěnder]; born 7 October 1999) is a Croatian cross-country skier. She competed in the women's sprint at the 2018 Winter Olympics.
