= 2016 Winter Youth Olympics =

Multi-sport event in Lillehammer, Norway

II Winter Youth Olympic Games
- Location: Lillehammer, Norway
- Motto: Go beyond. Create tomorrow. (Norwegian: Spreng grenser. Skap morgendagen.)
- Nations: 71
- Athletes: ~1,100
- Events: 70 in 7 sports (15 disciplines)
- Opening: 12 February
- Closing: 21 February
- Opened by: King Harald V
- Closed by: IOC president Thomas Bach
- Cauldron: Princess Ingrid Alexandra
- Stadium: Lysgårdsbakkene (opening); Håkons Hall (closing)

The 2016 Winter Youth Olympics (Norwegian: Olympiske vinterleker for ungdom 2016; Nynorsk: Olympiske vinterleikane for ungdom 2016), officially known as the II Winter Youth Olympic Games, took place in and around Lillehammer, Norway, from 12 to 21 February 2016. They were the fourth Youth Olympic Games and the second winter edition. Lillehammer was awarded the games on 7 December 2011 as the only candidate. The games reused venues from the 1994 Winter Olympics; this made Lillehammer the first city to host both the regular and Youth Olympics. In addition to Lillehammer Municipality, Olympic events were staged at venues in Hamar Municipality, Gjøvik Municipality and Øyer Municipality.

== Host selection ==
Lillehammer was the only city to bid for the games. The Norwegian Olympic Committee talked with Norwegian and regional authorities to investigate a bid and ultimately submitted a bid to the IOC. Upon the deadline for bidding, they were the only city to bid. Lillehammer hosted the 1994 Winter Olympics. They bid for the 2012 Winter Youth Olympics, but failed to become a candidate. Lake Placid, Lucerne, Zaragoza and Sofia all expressed interest in bidding but ultimately failed to submit any bids. On 7 December 2011, the International Olympic Committee selected Lillehammer as the host city of the 2016 Winter Youth Olympics.

== Organization ==
In January 2012, Siri Hatlen was appointed as head of the Lillehammer 2016 Organizing Committee. At the Closing ceremony of the 2012 Winter Youth Olympics in Innsbruck, Lillehammer was handed the Olympic Flag. Tomas Holmestad (33) is CEO of Lillehammer 2016, which holds office at Oppland Fylkeskommune. In August 2014, Lillehammer Organizing Committee counts 20 employees, and this number were expected to rise to 70-80 employees in January 2016.

== Venues ==
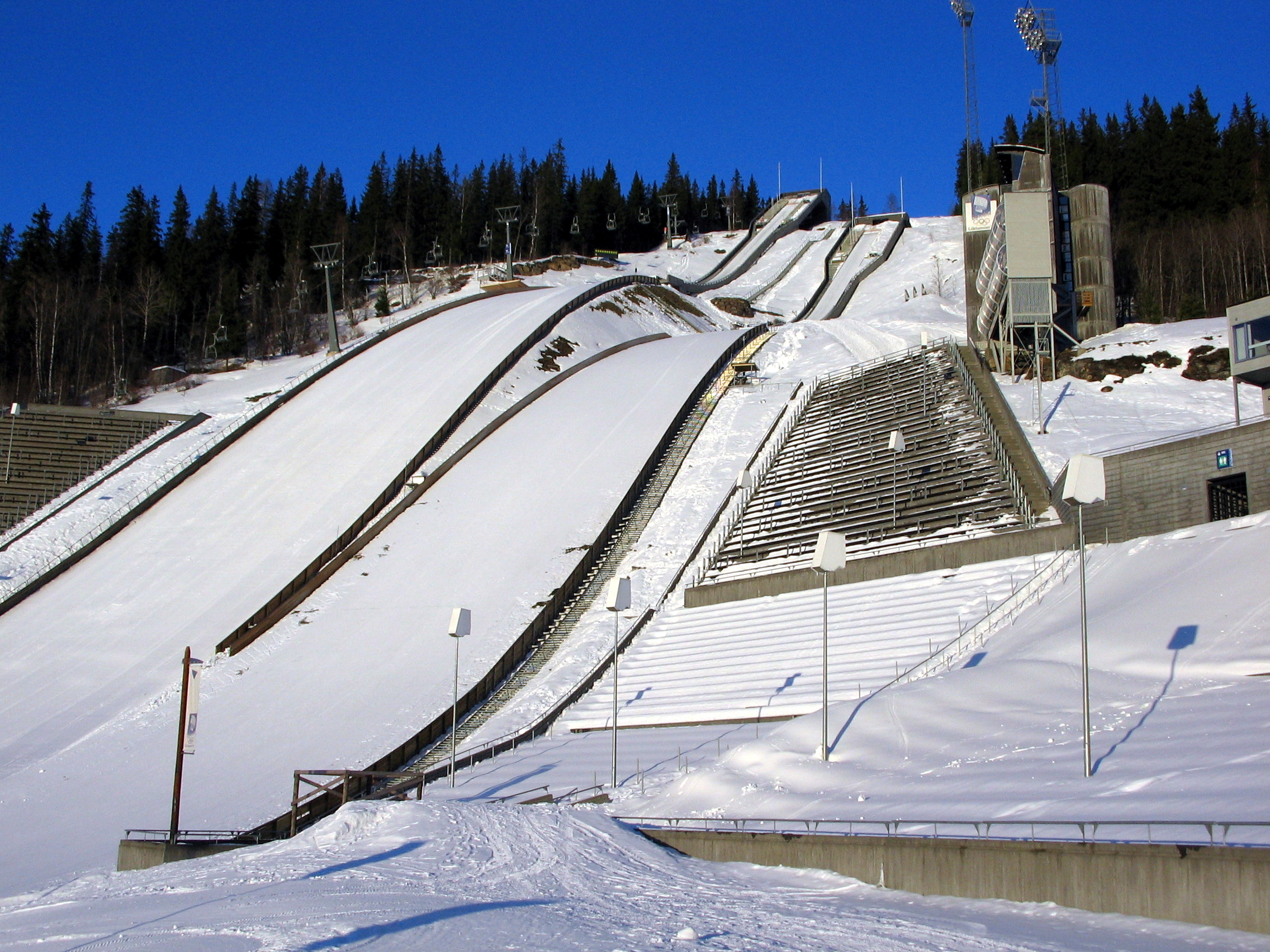
Like the rest of the competition venues, Lysgårdsbakken was built ahead of the 1994 Winter Olympics

Nine competition and eleven non-competition venues were used, with all except the Youth Olympic Village in Lillehammer being existing venues. The games were held in four municipalities: Lillehammer, Hamar, Gjøvik and Øyer. The former three are located nearby the lake of Mjøsa and each have about 27,000 residents, while Øyer has 5,000 residents and is located in the valley of Gudbrandsdalen. There were five competition venues in Lillehammer, two in Hamar and one in Gjøvik and Øyer.

In Lillehammer, the twin ski jumping hill of Lysgårdsbakken has a spectator capacity of 35,000. Lysgårdsbakken has a hill size of 138 and a K-point of 120, while the normal hill has a hill size of 100 and a K-point of 90. Birkebeineren Ski Stadium hosted cross-country skiing, biathlon and Nordic combined, with the stadium itself having a capacity for 31,000 spectators during cross-country skiing and 13,500 during biathlon. In addition, spectators could watch from along the tracks. Kanthaugen Freestyle Arena has a capacity for 15,000 spectators and hosted freestyle skiing and half-pipe snowboarding.

Lillehammer Olympic Bobsleigh and Luge Track is located at Hunderfossen and is the only bobsleigh, luge and skeleton track in the Nordic Countries. Kristins Hall hosted both ice hockey and curling. Gjøvik Olympic Cavern Hall is located in a man-made cave and featured the short track speed skating events. In Hamar, Vikingskipet hosted long track speed skating and Hamar Olympic Amphitheatre hosted figure skating. Alpine skiing and slopestyle snowboarding were undertaken at Hafjell in Øyer.

Lysgårdsbakken also hosted the opening ceremony. The medal ceremonies took place in the town plaza. Athletes and leader accommodation were provided at two Olympic Villages, one in Lillehammer for the Lillehammer and Øyer-based events, and one in Hamar for the Hamar and Gjøvik-based events. The Lillehammer village consisted of student apartments in combination with a hotel and apartment resort. They used Håkons Hall (who also hosted the closing ceremony) for dining. The Hamar village was Hotel Scandic Hamar. In addition, there are five designated cultural venues in Lillehammer: Kulturhuset Banken, Lillehammer Art Museum, Lillehammer University College, Maihaugen and the Nansen Academy. The Main Media Centre was located at Mesna Upper Secondary School, which is adjacent to Stampesletta.

All the competition venues were built ahead of the 1994 Winter Olympics. Kristins Hall is the only venue not used during those Games, while Håkons Hall and Kvitfjell were used. During Lillehammer 2016 Youth Olympic Games, Håkonshall was the venue for the Learn & Share program, whilst Kristins Hall was the official venue for ice hockey and curling. Kvitfjell was not used, and Hafjell was the main venue for downhill skiing, snowboard, and freeskiing instead.

== Marketing ==
=== Mascot ===
Sjogg

Mascot of the 2016 Winter Youth Olympics (Lillehammer)
- Creator: Line Ansethmoen
- Significance: A lynx

Lillehammer organizing committee launched an international mascot design competition in March and April 2014. The competition required that the design proposals would be on an animal (ordinary animal or a fantasy one), look youthful, be kind and open, sporty, and represent the look of Lillehammer 2016 Winter Youth Olympic Games. LYOGOC received over 50 proposals from all over the world, and a jury consisting of Birgit Skarstein, Julie Strømsvåg, Simen Staalnacke, and Marianne Aagotnes, selected three finalists. The final proposals were presented on the official Facebook page of Lillehammer 2016, where fans could vote on their favorite. It was the Lynx that won the competition, designed by 19-year-old Line Ansethmoen.

=== Sponsors ===
Sponsors of the 2016 Winter Youth Olympics
Worldwide Olympic Partners	Atos; The Coca-Cola Company; Dow Chemical Company; General Electric; McDonald's; Omega SA; Panasonic; Procter & Gamble; Samsung Electronics; Visa Inc.
National Partners	Adecco Group
Official sponsors	Bilia
Official suppliers	Byggmakker

== Cultural programme ==
Also a cultural programme was a part of the event, in which for example bandy was featured.

== The Games ==
=== Sports ===
The Youth Olympic Games featured 7 sports and 15 disciplines. The 70 events included 5 mixed team events (Mixed-NOCs), 9 mixed team events (NOCs), 29 boy's events, and 27 girl's events.

- Alpine skiing (9)
- Biathlon (6)
- Bobsleigh (2)
- Cross-country skiing (6)
- Curling (2)
- Figure skating (5)
- Freestyle skiing (6)
- Ice hockey (4)
- Luge (4)
- Nordic combined (2)
- Short track speed skating (5)
- Skeleton (2)
- Ski jumping (3)
- Snowboarding (7)
- Speed skating (7)
- Nordic Team Event included with cross country skiing.
- Team ski-snowboard cross included with snowboarding.

=== New events ===
A number of events have been added to the programme.

Biathlon (1)

- Single mixed relay

Bobsleigh (2)

- Monobob race (boys/girls)

Cross-country skiing (2)

- Cross-country cross (boys/girls)

Freestyle skiing (2)

- Slopestyle (boys/girls)

Snowboarding (2)

- Snowboard cross (boys/girls)

Combined (2)

- Mixed Nordic team event
- Mixed team ski-snowboard cross

== Participating nations ==
The countries listed below have qualified at least one provisional athlete. 7 countries (Colombia, Israel, Jamaica, Kenya, Malaysia, Portugal and Timor Leste) made their Winter Youth Olympic Games debut.
The numbers in parentheses represents the number of participants qualified.

Participating National Olympic Committees
- Andorra (2)
- Argentina (9)
- Armenia (2)
- Australia (17)
- Austria (35)
- Belarus (16)
- Belgium (9)
- Bosnia and Herzegovina (5)
- Brazil (10)
- Bulgaria (12)
- Canada (54)
- Chile (8)
- China (23)
- Colombia (1)
- Croatia (8)
- Cyprus (1)
- Czech Republic (43)
- Denmark (4)
- Estonia (14)
- Finland (42)
- France (32)
- Georgia (2)
- Germany (44)
- Great Britain (16)
- Greece (3)
- Hungary (15)
- Iceland (3)
- India (1)
- Iran (2)
- Ireland (1)
- Israel (2)
- Italy (37)
- Jamaica (1)
- Japan (31)
- Kazakhstan (20)
- Kenya (1)
- Kyrgyzstan (1)
- Latvia (14)
- Lebanon (2)
- Liechtenstein (2)
- Lithuania (10)
- Luxembourg (1)
- Macedonia (2)
- Malaysia (1)
- Mexico (2)
- Moldova (2)
- Monaco (1)
- Mongolia (2)
- Montenegro (2)
- Nepal (1)
- Netherlands (13)
- Norway (73) (Host)
- New Zealand (11)
- Poland (21)
- Portugal (1)
- Romania (22)
- Russia (72)
- San Marino (1)
- Serbia (3)
- Slovakia (33)
- Slovenia (20)
- South Africa (1)
- South Korea (30)
- Spain (6)
- Sweden (39)
- Switzerland (48)
- Chinese Taipei (4)
- Timor-Leste (1)
- Turkey (13)
- Ukraine (23)
- United States (62)

=== Number of athletes by National Olympic Committee ===
IOC Letter Code	Country	Athletes
NOR	Norway	73
RUS	Russia	72
USA	United States	62
CAN	Canada	54
SUI	Switzerland	48
GER	Germany	44
CZE	Czech Republic	43
FIN	Finland	42
SWE	Sweden	39
ITA	Italy	37
AUT	Austria	35
SVK	Slovakia	33
FRA	France	32
JPN	Japan	31
KOR	South Korea	30
CHN	China	23
UKR	Ukraine	23
ROU	Romania	22
POL	Poland	21
KAZ	Kazakhstan	20
SLO	Slovenia	20
AUS	Australia	17
BLR	Belarus	16
GBR	Great Britain	16
HUN	Hungary	15
EST	Estonia	14
LAT	Latvia	14
NED	Netherlands	13
TUR	Turkey	13
BUL	Bulgaria	12
NZL	New Zealand	11
BRA	Brazil	10
LTU	Lithuania	10
ARG	Argentina	9
BEL	Belgium	9
CHI	Chile	8
CRO	Croatia	8
ESP	Spain	6
BIH	Bosnia and Herzegovina	5
DEN	Denmark	4
TPE	Chinese Taipei	4
GRE	Greece	3
ISL	Iceland	3
SRB	Serbia	3
AND	Andorra	2
ARM	Armenia	2
GEO	Georgia	2
IRI	Iran	2
ISR	Israel	2
LBN	Lebanon	2
LIE	Liechtenstein	2
MKD	Macedonia	2
MEX	Mexico	2
MDA	Moldova	2
MGL	Mongolia	2
MNE	Montenegro	2
COL	Colombia	1
CYP	Cyprus	1
IND	India	1
IRL	Ireland	1
JAM	Jamaica	1
KGZ	Kyrgyzstan	1
LUX	Luxembourg	1
MAS	Malaysia	1
MON	Monaco	1
NEP	Nepal	1
POR	Portugal	1
SMR	San Marino	1
RSA	South Africa	1
TLS	Timor-Leste	1

== Calendar ==
OC	Opening ceremony	●	Event competitions	1	Event finals	EG	Exhibition Gala	CC	Closing ceremony

February	12 Fri	13 Sat	14 Sun	15 Mon	16 Tue	17 Wed	18 Thu	19 Fri	20 Sat	21 Sun	Events
Ceremonies	OC									CC	
Alpine skiing		2	2		1	1	1	1	1		9
Biathlon			2	2		1				1	6
Bobsleigh									2		2
Cross-country skiing		2			2		2				6
Curling	●	●	●	●	●	1		●	●	1	2
Figure skating		●	●	2	2				1		5
Freestyle skiing			2	2				2			6
Ice hockey	●	●	●	●	1		1	●	●	2	4
Luge			1	2	1						4
Nordic combined					1			1			2
Short track speed skating			2		2				1		5
Skeleton								2			2
Ski jumping					2		1				3
Snowboarding			2	2	1			2			7
Speed skating		2		2		1		2			7
Total events		6	11	12	13	4	5	10	5	4	70
Cumulative total		6	17	29	42	46	51	61	66	70	
February	12 Fri	13 Sat	14 Sun	15 Mon	16 Tue	17 Wed	18 Thu	19 Fri	20 Sat	21 Sun	Events

== Medal table ==
The top ten listed National Olympic Committees (NOCs) by number of gold medals are listed below with the host nation, Norway, being highlighted.

Medals won by teams of athletes from more than one NOC are included in the table as medals awarded to a mixed-NOCs team.

* Host nation (Norway)

Rank	Nation	Gold	Silver	Bronze	Total
1	United States	10	6	0	16
2	South Korea	10	3	3	16
3	Russia	7	8	9	24
4	Germany	7	7	8	22
5	Norway*	4	9	6	19
–	Mixed-NOCs	4	4	5	13
6	Switzerland	4	3	4	11
7	China	3	5	2	10
8	Canada	3	2	1	6
9	Sweden	3	2	0	5
10	Slovenia	3	0	2	5
11–28	Remaining	12	21	30	63
Totals (28 entries)		70	70	70	210

Source: IOC

Preceded by Innsbruck	Winter Youth Olympic Games; Lillehammer; 2016	Succeeded by Lausanne
