= Ice hockey at the 2016 Winter Youth Olympics – Boys' team rosters =

These were the team rosters of the nations participating in the Boys' ice hockey tournament of the 2016 Winter Youth Olympics. Each team was permitted a roster of 15 skaters and 2 goaltenders.

== Canada ==
The following is the Canadian roster for the Boys' ice hockey tournament at the 2016 Winter Youth Olympics.

Head coach: Martin Raymond

- Alexis Gravel (G)
- Olivier Rodrigue (G)
- Jett Woo (D)
- Jared McIsaac (D)
- Ty Smith (D)
- Ryan Merkley (D)
- Dennis Busby (D)
- Declan Chisholm (D)
- Benoît-Olivier Groulx (FW)
- Aidan Dudas (FW)
- Gabriel Fortier (FW)
- Luka Burzan (FW)
- Tristen Nielsen (FW)
- Anderson MacDonald (FW)
- Allan McShane (FW)
- Carson Focht (FW)
- Connor Roberts (FW)

== Finland ==
The following is the Finnish roster for the Boys' ice hockey tournament at the 2016 Winter Youth Olympics.

Head coach: Tommi Niemelä

- Tobias Akerman
- Justus Annunen
- Konsta Hirvonen
- Jesperi Kotkaniemi
- Miska Kukkonen
- Rasmus Kupari
- Eetu Maki
- Kalle Matikainen
- Jesse Moilanen
- Arttu Nevasaari
- Niklas Nordgren
- Jasper Rannisto
- Uula Ruikka
- Santeri Salmela
- Samuel Salonen
- Toni Utunen
- Jimi Uusitalo

== Norway ==
The following is the Norwegian roster for the Boys' ice hockey tournament at the 2016 Winter Youth Olympics.

Head coach: René Hansen

- Erik Beier Jensen
- Jens Bjornslett
- Sondre Bolling Vaaler
- Truls Brathen
- Pontus Finstad
- Kristian Hovik
- Sander Hurrod
- Markus Mikkelsen
- Fredrik Pedersen
- Mathias Emilio Pettersen
- Kalle Rode
- Lars Rodne
- Theo Rooseboom De Vries
- Oliver Skramo
- Alexander Thomas
- Kristoffer Thomassen
- Christian Wetteland

== Russia ==
The following is the Russian roster for the Boys' ice hockey tournament at the 2016 Winter Youth Olympics.

Head coach: Yevgeny Filinov

- Gleb Babintsev
- Maxim Denezhkin
- Grigori Denisenko
- Georgi Dubrovski
- Alexander Khovanov
- Vladislav Kotkov
- Pavel Kupchikhin
- Anton Malyshev
- Amir Miftakhov
- Kirill Nizhnikov
- Pavel Rotenberg
- Ilyas Sitdikov
- Yegor Sokolov
- Andrei Svechnikov
- Alexander Zhabreyev
- Bogdan Zhilyakov
- Danil Zhuravlyov

== United States ==
The following is the American roster for the Boys' ice hockey tournament at the 2016 Winter Youth Olympics.

Head coach: Scott Paluch

No.	Pos.	2016 Winter Youth Olympics United States U-16 boys' ice hockey team roster	Height	Weight	Birthdate	Hometown	Current Team
1	G	Drew DeRidder	178 cm (5 ft 10 in)	66 kg (146 lb)	1 May 2000	Fenton, Michigan	Oakland Jr. Grizzlies (T1EHL)
30	G	Todd Scott	180 cm (5 ft 11 in)	86 kg (190 lb)	23 May 2000	Albertville, Minnesota	Omaha AAA Hockey Club (NAPHL)
7	D	Ty Emberson – A	185 cm (6 ft 1 in)	86 kg (190 lb)	23 May 2000	Eau Claire, Wisconsin	Memorial High School (WIAA)
2	D	Christian Krygier	183 cm (6 ft 0 in)	74 kg (163 lb)	5 May 2000	Novi, Michigan	Little Caesars Hockey Club (HPHL)
3	D	Will MacKinnon	180 cm (5 ft 11 in)	86 kg (190 lb)	13 April 2000	Plymouth, Michigan	HoneyBaked Hockey Club (HPHL)
5	D	Adam Samuelsson	193 cm (6 ft 4 in)	95 kg (209 lb)	21 June 2000	Rye, New York	Connecticut Jr. Rangers (USPHL)
6	D	Mattias Samuelsson – C	191 cm (6 ft 3 in)	91 kg (201 lb)	14 March 2000	Voorhees, New Jersey	Northwood School
4	D	Jacob Semik	183 cm (6 ft 0 in)	70 kg (150 lb)	10 March 2000	Canton, Michigan	HoneyBaked Hockey Club (HPHL)
17	F	Jack DeBoer	188 cm (6 ft 2 in)	88 kg (194 lb)	17 August 2000	Madison, New Jersey	Salisbury School (NEPSAC)
10	F	Jonathan Gruden	178 cm (5 ft 10 in)	66 kg (146 lb)	4 May 2000	Rochester, Michigan	HoneyBaked Hockey Club (HPHL)
16	F	Erik Middendorf	183 cm (6 ft 0 in)	75 kg (165 lb)	11 July 2000	Scottsdale, Arizona	Jr. Coyotes (T1EHL)
15	F	Jacob Pivonka – A	180 cm (5 ft 11 in)	81 kg (179 lb)	28 February 2000	Woodridge, Illinois	Chicago Mission (HPHL)
11	F	Ryan Savage	178 cm (5 ft 10 in)	75 kg (165 lb)	31 March 2000	Scottsdale, Arizona	EC Red Bull Salzburg
14	F	Oliver Wahlstrom	185 cm (6 ft 1 in)	86 kg (190 lb)	13 June 2000	Quincy, Massachusetts	Shattuck-Saint Mary's
8	F	T. J. Walsh	175 cm (5 ft 9 in)	73 kg (161 lb)	29 April 2000	Shrewsbury, Massachusetts	Cushing Academy (NEPSAC)
9	F	Tyler Weiss	178 cm (5 ft 10 in)	68 kg (150 lb)	3 January 2000	Raleigh, North Carolina	Don Mills Flyers (GTHL)
12	F	Jake Wise	180 cm (5 ft 11 in)	81 kg (179 lb)	28 February 2000	North Andover, Massachusetts	Central Catholic High School (MIAA)
