= Russia at the 2016 Winter Youth Olympics =

- IOC code: RUS
- NOC: Russian Olympic Committee
- Website: www.olympic.ru (in Russian and English)

in Lillehammer
- Competitors: 72 in 15 sports
- Flag bearer: Sofia Tikhonova
- Medals Ranked 3rd: Gold 7 Silver 8 Bronze 9 Total 24

Winter Youth Olympics appearances (overview)
- 2012; 2016; 2020; 2024

Russia competed at the 2016 Winter Youth Olympics in Lillehammer, Norway from 12 to 21 February 2016. The Russian Olympic Committee revealed the team on 28 January 2016.

== Medalists ==
Medal	Name	Sport	Event	Date
Gold	Ekaterina Borisova; Dmitry Sopot	Figure skating	Pair	15 February
Gold	Anastasia Shpilevaya; Grigory Smirnov	Figure skating	Ice dancing	16 February
Gold	Polina Tsurskaya	Figure skating	Girls' singles	16 February
Gold	Maya Yakunina	Cross-country skiing	Girls' 5 km	18 February
Gold	Evgenii Rukosuev	Skeleton	Boys	19 February
Gold	Sofia Tikhonova; Vitaly Ivanov; Maksim Sergeev; Maya Yakunina; Igor Fedotov	Cross-country skiing Nordic combined Ski jumping	Nordic mixed team	19 February
Gold	Lana Prusakova	Freestyle skiing	Girls' slopestyle	19 February
Silver	Egor Tutmin	Biathlon	Boys' pursuit	15 February
Silver	Olesya Mikhaylenko; Evgenii Petrov; Vsevolod Kashkin; Konstantin Korshunov	Luge	Team relay	16 February
Silver	Sofia Tikhonova	Ski jumping	Girls' normal hill	16 February
Silver	Yuliya Petrova	Cross-country skiing	Girls' sprint	16 February
Silver	Maria Sotskova	Figure skating	Girls' singles	16 February
Silver	Vlad Khadarin	Snowboarding	Boys' slopestyle	19 February
Silver	Anastasiia Silanteva	Alpine skiing	Parallel mixed team	20 February
Silver	Aleksey Konkov	Alpine skiing	Parallel mixed team	20 February
Silver	Maksim Ivanov	Bobsleigh	Boys' monobob	20 February
Bronze	Egor Tutmin	Biathlon	Boys' sprint	14 February
Bronze	Vsevolod Kashkin; Konstantin Korshunov	Luge	Doubles	15 February
Bronze	Alina Ustimkina; Nikita Volodin	Figure skating	Pair	15 February
Bronze	Dmitri Aliev	Figure skating	Boys' singles	15 February
Bronze	Said Karimulla Khalili	Biathlon	Boys' pursuit	15 February
Bronze	Anastasia Skoptsova; Kirill Aleshin	Figure skating	Ice dancing	16 February
Bronze	Ekaterina Ponedelko; Egor Tutmin	Biathlon	Single mixed relay	17 February
Bronze	Igor Fedotov	Cross-country skiing	Boys' 10 km	18 February
Bronze	Russia men's national under-16 ice hockey team: Gleb Babintsev; Maxim Denezhkin; Grigori Denisenko; Georgi Dubrovski; Alexander Khovanov; Vladislav Kotkov; Pavel Kupchikhin; Anton Malyshev; Amir Miftakhov; Kirill Nizhnikov; Pavel Rotenberg; Ilyas Sitdikov; Yegor Sokolov; Andrei Svechnikov; Alexander Zhabreyev; Bogdan Zhilyakov; Danil Zhuravlyov	Ice hockey	Boys' tournament	20 February

Medals by sport
Sport	1st place, gold medalist(s)	2nd place, silver medalist(s)	3rd place, bronze medalist(s)	Total
Figure skating	3	1	3	7
Cross-country skiing	1	1	1	3
Freestyle skiing	1	0	0	1
Mixed	1	0	0	1
Skelethon	1	0	0	1
Biathlon	0	1	3	4
Luge	0	1	1	2
Alpine skiing	0	1	0	1
Bobsleigh	0	1	0	1
Ski jumping	0	1	0	1
Snowboarding	0	1	0	1
Ice hockey	0	0	1	1
Total	7	8	9	24

Medals by date
Day	Date	1st place, gold medalist(s)	2nd place, silver medalist(s)	3rd place, bronze medalist(s)	Total
Day 1	13 February	0	0	0	0
Day 2	14 February	0	0	1	1
Day 3	15 February	1	1	4	6
Day 4	16 February	2	4	1	7
Day 5	17 February	0	0	1	1
Day 6	18 February	1	0	1	2
Day 7	19 February	3	1	0	4
Day 8	20 February	0	2	1	3
Day 9	21 February	0	0	0	0
Total		7	8	9	24

=== Medalists in mixed NOCs events ===
Medal	Name	Sport	Event	Date
Gold	Dmitri Aliev; Anastasia Skoptsova; Kirill Aleshin	Figure skating	Team trophy	20 February

== Alpine skiing ==
Boys

Athlete	Event	Run 1		Run 2		Total	
Athlete	Event	Time	Rank	Time	Rank	Time	Rank
Aleksey Konkov	Slalom	DNF		did not advance			
Aleksey Konkov	Giant slalom	1:19.29	8	1:20.95	21	2:40.24	12
Aleksey Konkov	Super-G	—N/a				1:12.80	20
Aleksey Konkov	Combined	1:13.07	10	42.90	15	1:55.97	12

Girls

Athlete	Event	Run 1		Run 2		Total	
Athlete	Event	Time	Rank	Time	Rank	Time	Rank
Anastasia Silanteva	Slalom	58.48	17	53.65	16	1:52.13	16
Anastasia Silanteva	Giant slalom	DNF		did not advance			
Anastasia Silanteva	Super-G	—N/a				1:17.08	22
Anastasia Silanteva	Combined	1:16.09	12	46.88	18	2:02.97	14

Parallel mixed team

Athletes	Event	Round of 16	Quarterfinals	Semifinals	Final / BM	
Athletes	Event	Opposition Score	Opposition Score	Opposition Score	Opposition Score	Rank
Anastasia Silanteva; Aleksey Konkov	Parallel mixed team	Italy; W 4 – 0	Slovenia; W 2^{+} – 2	Canada; W 2^{+} – 2	Germany; L 1 – 3	2nd place, silver medalist(s)

== Biathlon ==
Boys

Athlete	Event	Time	Misses	Rank
Said Karimulla Khalili	Sprint	19:46.1	2	6
Said Karimulla Khalili	Pursuit	29:28.4	4	3rd place, bronze medalist(s)
Egor Tutmin	Sprint	19:19.5	2	3rd place, bronze medalist(s)
Egor Tutmin	Pursuit	29:21.4	5	2nd place, silver medalist(s)

Girls

Athlete	Event	Time	Misses	Rank
Anastasia Khaliullina	Sprint	19:27.2	2	12
Anastasia Khaliullina	Pursuit	29:39.8	10	31
Ekaterina Pondelko	Sprint	19:50.8	2	17
Ekaterina Pondelko	Pursuit	26:32.1	3	9

Mixed

Athletes	Event	Time	Misses	Rank
Ekaterina Ponedelko; Egor Tutmin	Single mixed relay	41:50.3	3+13	3rd place, bronze medalist(s)
Ekaterina Ponedelko; Anastasia Khaliullina; Egor Tutmin; Said Karimulla Khalili	Mixed relay	1:21:00.7	2+15	5

== Bobsleigh ==
Athlete	Event	Run 1		Run 2		Total	
Athlete	Event	Time	Rank	Time	Rank	Time	Rank
Maksim Ivanov	Boys'	56.93	1	57.51	5	1:54.44	2nd place, silver medalist(s)
Valentina Bologova	Girls'	59.25	7	59.43	7	1:58.68	7
Anastasia Dudkina	Girls'	59.87	11	59.55	10	1:59.42	12

== Cross-country skiing ==
Boys

Athlete	Event	Qualification		Quarterfinal		Semifinal		Final	
Athlete	Event	Time	Rank	Time	Rank	Time	Rank	Time	Rank
Igor Fedotov	10 km freestyle	—N/a						23:59.2	3rd place, bronze medalist(s)
Igor Fedotov	Classical sprint	3:05.58	10 Q	3:02.68	2 Q	2:59.85	4	did not advance	
Igor Fedotov	Cross-country cross	3:23.58	34	—N/a		did not advance			
Yaroslav Rybochkin	10 km freestyle	—N/a						24:17.1	6
Yaroslav Rybochkin	Classical sprint	3:10.09	22 Q	3:23.76	6	did not advance			
Yaroslav Rybochkin	Cross-country cross	3:18.82	28 Q	—N/a		3:11.18	4	did not advance	

Girls

Athlete	Event	Qualification		Quarterfinal		Semifinal		Final	
Athlete	Event	Time	Rank	Time	Rank	Time	Rank	Time	Rank
Yuliya Petrova	5 km freestyle	—N/a						14:50.5	24
Yuliya Petrova	Classical sprint	3:31.55	2 Q	3:30.46	1 Q	3:27.24	1 Q	3:21.95	2nd place, silver medalist(s)
Yuliya Petrova	Cross-country cross	3:43.94	9 Q	—N/a		3:38.17	4 q	3:42.46	10
Maya Yakunina	5 km freestyle	—N/a						12:58.8	1st place, gold medalist(s)
Maya Yakunina	Classical sprint	3:39.14	14 Q	3:39.18	5	did not advance			
Maya Yakunina	Cross-country cross	3:37.72	5 Q	—N/a		3:34.31	2 Q	3:32.72	6

== Curling ==
=== Mixed team ===
Team

- Maria Arkhipova
- German Doronin
- Nadezhda Karelina
- Sergei Maksimov

Round Robin

Group A	Skip	W	L
United States	Luc Violette	6	1
Switzerland	Selina Witschonke	6	1
Russia	Nadezhda Karelina	6	1
Turkey	Oğuzhan Karakurt	3	4
Italy	Luca Rizzolli	3	4
China	Du Hongrui	2	5
New Zealand	Matthew Neilson	1	6
Japan	Kota Ito	1	6

Draw 1

Sheet B	1	2	3	4	5	6	7	8	Final
Russia (Karelina)	3	0	1	0	2	0	0	1	7
New Zealand (Neilson)	0	2	0	1	0	0	2	0	5

Draw 2

Sheet D	1	2	3	4	5	6	7	8	Final
Japan (Ito)	1	0	0	1	0	1	0	0	3
Russia (Karelina)	0	2	0	0	1	0	1	1	5

Draw 3

Sheet C	1	2	3	4	5	6	7	8	Final
China (Du)	0	0	2	1	0	1	0	X	4
Russia (Karelina)	2	0	0	0	2	0	2	X	6

Draw 4

Sheet A	1	2	3	4	5	6	7	8	Final
Russia (Karelina)	0	1	3	1	0	3	0	1	9
United States (Violette)	1	0	0	0	2	0	3	0	6

Draw 5

Sheet C	1	2	3	4	5	6	7	8	Final
Russia (Karelina)	0	0	1	0	1	0	3	0	5
Switzerland (Witschonke)	1	1	0	2	0	2	0	1	7

Draw 6

Sheet A	1	2	3	4	5	6	7	8	Final
Italy (Rizzolli)	1	1	0	0	1	0	0	X	3
Russia (Karelina)	0	0	2	2	0	1	0	X	5

Draw 7

Sheet D	1	2	3	4	5	6	7	8	Final
Russia (Karelina)	1	0	1	1	0	1	0	1	5
Turkey (Karakurt)	0	1	0	0	1	0	1	0	3

Quarterfinals

Sheet D	1	2	3	4	5	6	7	8	Final
Great Britain (Whyte)	1	0	1	0	1	0	2	0	5
Russia (Karelina)	0	3	0	1	0	2	0	3	9

Semifinals

Sheet D	1	2	3	4	5	6	7	8	Final
United States (Violette)	0	2	3	0	0	2	1	0	8
Russia (Karelina)	2	0	0	3	0	0	0	1	6

Bronze Medal Game

Sheet B	1	2	3	4	5	6	7	8	Final
Switzerland (Witschonke)	3	0	2	1	0	2	3	X	11
Russia (Karelina)	0	1	0	0	2	0	0	X	3

=== Mixed doubles ===
Athletes	Event	Round of 32	Round of 16	Quarterfinals	Semifinals	Final / BM	
Athletes	Event	Opposition Result	Opposition Result	Opposition Result	Opposition Result	Opposition Result	Rank
Raissa Rodrigues (BRA); German Doronin (RUS)	Mixed doubles	Polat (TUR); Zhang (CHN); L 5 – 9	did not advance				
Kristin Laidsalu (EST); Sergei Maksimov (RUS)	Mixed doubles	Konuksever (TUR); Rizzolli (ITA); W 5 – 4	Sasaki (JPN); Tardi (CAN); L 2 – 6	did not advance			
Nadezhda Karelina (RUS); Kosuke Aita (JPN)	Mixed doubles	Krupanská (CZE); Karakurt (TUR); W 8 – 2	Constantini (ITA); Kinnear (GBR); L 3 – 7	did not advance			
Maria Arkhipova (RUS); Matthew Neilson (NZL)	Mixed doubles	Oh (KOR); Esenboğa (TUR); L 4 – 11	did not advance				

== Figure skating ==
Singles

Athlete	Event	SP		FS		Total	
Athlete	Event	Points	Rank	Points	Rank	Points	Rank
Dmitri Aliev	Boys' singles	67.24	5	142.53	2	209.77	3rd place, bronze medalist(s)
Maria Sotskova	Girls' singles	53.40	8	116.10	2	169.50	2nd place, silver medalist(s)
Polina Tsurskaya	Girls' singles	58.65	4	127.39	1	186.04	1st place, gold medalist(s)

Couples

Athletes	Event	SP/SD		FS/FD		Total	
Athletes	Event	Points	Rank	Points	Rank	Points	Rank
Ekaterina Borisova; Dmitry Sopot	Pairs	60.80	2	107.86	1	168.66	1st place, gold medalist(s)
Alina Ustimkina; Nikita Volodin	Pairs	56.38	3	96.39	3	152.77	3rd place, bronze medalist(s)
Anastasia Shpilevaya; Grigory Smirnov	Ice dancing	57.93	1	83.95	1	141.88	1st place, gold medalist(s)
Anastasia Skoptsova; Kirill Aleshin	Ice dancing	57.75	2	76.87	3	134.62	3rd place, bronze medalist(s)

Mixed NOC team trophy

Athletes	Event	Free skate/Free dance					
Athletes	Event	Ice dance	Pairs	Girls	Boys	Total	
Athletes	Event	Points Team points	Points Team points	Points Team points	Points Team points	Points	Rank
Team Courage; Anastasia Shpilevaya / Grigory Smirnov (RUS); Irma Caldara / Edoardo Caputo (ITA); Alexandra Hagarová (SVK); Cha Jun-hwan (KOR)	Team trophy	86.48; 8	68.81; 1	75.55; 2	139.97; 6	17	6
Team Desire; Anastasia Skoptsova / Kirill Aleshin (RUS); Sarah Rose / Joseph Goodpaster (USA); Li Xiangning (CHN); Dmitri Aliev (RUS)	Team trophy	80.28; 7	82.47; 4	88.73; 5	141.06; 7	23	1st place, gold medalist(s)
Team Determination; Francesca Righi / Pietro Papetti (ITA); Alina Ustimkina / Nikita Volodin (RUS); Annika Hocke (GER); Adam Siao Him Fa (FRA)	Team trophy	53.70; 1	100.98; 6	82.41; 3	97.80; 4	14	8
Team Motivation; Guostė Damulevičiūtė / Deividas Kizala (LTU); Ekaterina Borisova / Dmitry Sopot (RUS); Byun Ji-hyun (KOR); Chew Kai Xiang (MAS)	Team trophy	55.56; 2	104.80; 8	99.94; 6	86.56; 2	18	4

== Freestyle skiing ==
Halfpipe

Athlete	Event	Final				
Athlete	Event	Run 1	Run 2	Run 3	Best	Rank
Vladimir Galaiko	Boys' halfpipe	48.20	27.40	55.40	55.40	8
Lana Prusakova	Girls' halfpipe	52.40	55.60	49.20	55.60	6

Ski cross

Athlete	Event	Qualification		Group heats		Semifinal	Final
Athlete	Event	Time	Rank	Points	Rank	Position	Position
Kirill Bagin	Boys' ski cross	45.22	13 Q	9	11	did not advance	
Dana Vovk	Girls' ski cross	47.04	6	11	11	did not advance	

Slopestyle

Athlete	Event	Final			
Athlete	Event	Run 1	Run 2	Best	Rank
Lana Prusakova	Girls' slopestyle	77.00	21.60	77.00	1st place, gold medalist(s)

== Ice hockey ==
=== Boys' tournament ===
Roster

- Gleb Babintsev
- Maxim Denezhkin
- Grigori Denisenko
- Georgi Dubrovski
- Alexander Khovanov
- Vladislav Kotkov
- Pavel Kupchikhin
- Anton Malyshev
- Amir Miftakhov
- Kirill Nizhnikov
- Pavel Rotenberg
- Ilyas Sitdikov
- Yegor Sokolov
- Andrei Svechnikov
- Alexander Zhabreyev
- Bogdan Zhilyakov
- Danil Zhuravlyov

Group Stage

Pos	Team	Pld	W	OTW	OTL	L	GF	GA	GD	Pts	Qualification
1	Canada	4	3	0	0	1	18	7	+11	9	Advance to semifinals
2	United States	4	3	0	0	1	18	7	+11	9	Advance to semifinals
3	Russia	4	2	1	0	1	21	9	+12	8	Advance to semifinals
4	Finland	4	1	0	1	2	14	11	+3	4	Advance to semifinals
5	Norway	4	0	0	0	4	1	38	−37	0	

Updated to match(es) played on 19 February 2016. Source: IIHF.com

13 February 2016; 17:00	Canada	3–4 (0–2, 1–0, 2–2)	Russia	Kristins Hall; Attendance: 1,755

Game reference

Olivier Rodrigue
Goalies
Amir Miftakhov
Referee:
(Sweden) Lars Johan Gossas
Linesmen:
(Denmark) Niclas Lundsgaard
(Norway) Thomas Nordberg Pettersen

	0–1	02:04 – Sokolov (Svechnikov, Kotkov) (PP)
	0-2	05:20 – Svechnikov (Khovanov, Kotkov)
Smith (Dudas) (PP) – 27:37	1–2
	1–3	30:37 – Kotkov (Svechnikov, Khovanov)
	1–4	34:39 – Khovanov
McShane – 44:12	2–4
Burzan (EA) – 44:55	3–4

3 min
Penalties
4.5 min
40
Shots
21

15 February 2016; 20:00	Russia	13–1 (4–0, 3–0, 6–1)	Norway	Kristins Hall; Attendance: 1,198

Game reference

Georgi Dubrovski
Goalies
Kristian Hovik
Referee:
(Switzerland) Alex DiPietro
Linesmen:
(France) Clement Goncalves
(Sweden) Tobias Nordlander

Zhabreyev (Denisenko) – 03:17	1–0
Zhabreyev (Kupchikhin, Nizhnikov) – 11:01	2–0
Svechnikov (Khovanov, Zhilyakov) – 11:27	3–0
Svechnikov (Sitdikov) – 13:43	4–0
Zhabreyev (Svechnikov) (SH) – 21:01	5–0
Denezhkin (Sokolov) – 24:45	6–0
Svechnikov (Zhabreyev) – 29:59	7–0
	7–1	30:42 – Pettersen (Beier Jensen, Skramo)
Khovanov (Svechnikov) – 31:55	8–1
Nizhnikov (Denisenko) – 33:48	9–1
Nizhnikov (Denisenko, Zhabreyev) – 37:05	10–1
Svechnikov (Khovanov, Sokolov) (PP) – 38:34	11–1
Sokolov (Rotenberg) – 42:41	12–1
Denisenko (Zhuravlyov, Zhabreyev) – 43:36	13–1

19 min
Penalties
6 min
51
Shots
10

16 February 2016; 17:00	Finland	1–2 GWS (0–1, 1–0, 0–0, 0–0, 0–1)	Russia	Kristins Hall; Attendance: 653

Game reference
Jimi Uusitalo	Goalies	Amir Miftakhov	Referee: (Germany) Marc Iwert; Linesmen: (Denmark) Niclas Lundgaard (Norway) Thomas Nordberg Pettersen
/ 0–1 / 02:11 – Svechnikov (Khovanov); Kotkaniemi (Utunen, Nevasaari) – 26:26 / 1–1			Referee: (Germany) Marc Iwert; Linesmen: (Denmark) Niclas Lundgaard (Norway) Thomas Nordberg Pettersen
Salonen (miss); Kotkaniemi (miss); Maki (miss); Nevasaari; Nevasaari (miss); Ruikka (miss)	Shootout	(miss) Khovanov; (miss) Svechnikov; (miss) Zhabreyev; Khovanov; (miss) Denezhkin; Khovanov	Referee: (Germany) Marc Iwert; Linesmen: (Denmark) Niclas Lundgaard (Norway) Thomas Nordberg Pettersen
9 min	Penalties	9 min	Referee: (Germany) Marc Iwert; Linesmen: (Denmark) Niclas Lundgaard (Norway) Thomas Nordberg Pettersen
21	Shots	16	Referee: (Germany) Marc Iwert; Linesmen: (Denmark) Niclas Lundgaard (Norway) Thomas Nordberg Pettersen

18 February 2016; 17:00	Russia	2–4 (0–2, 1–0, 1–2)	United States	Youth Hall; Attendance: 564

Game reference

Amir Miftakhov
Goalies
Drew DeRidder
Referee:
(Switzerland) Alex DiPietro
Linesmen:
(Denmark) Niclas Lundgaard
(Sweden) Tobias Nordlander

	0–1	04:16 – Weiss (Wahlstrom)
	0–2	12:25 – DeBoer (Wise, Walsh)
Zhabreyev (Babintsev, Denisenko) – 22:38	1–2
	1–3	31:25 – Pivonka (Weiss)
	1–4	39:06 – Gruden (MacKinnon, Middendorf)
Nizhnikov (Denezhkin) – 42:46	2–4

26.5 min
Penalties
10.5 min
24
Shots
20

Semifinals

19 February 2016; 20:00	United States	3–0 (0–0, 1–0, 2–0)	Russia	Youth Hall; Attendance: 1,902

Game reference

Drew DeRidder
Goalies
Amir Miftakhov
Referee:
(Sweden) Lars Johan Gossas
Linesmen:
(United Kingdom) Danny Beresford
(Norway) Thomas Nordberg Pettersen

Pivonka (Middendorf, Savage) – 19:41	1–0
Wise (Gruden) (SH, EN) – 43:18	2–0
Walsh (Wise) – 44:30	3–0

6 min
Penalties
13 min
23
Shots
19

Bronze medal game

20 February 2016; 20:00	Russia	6–2 (1–1, 3–1, 2–0)	Finland	Kristins Hall; Attendance: 1,652

Game reference

Amir Miftakhov
Goalies
Justus Annunen
Referee:
(Germany) Marc Iwert
Linesmen:
(Belarus) Aleh Kliashcheunikau
(Norway) Thomas Nordberg Pettersen

	0–1	00:30 – Kupari (Nevasaari)
Zhuravlyov (Denisenko, Zhabreyev) (PP) – 08:28	1–1
Nizhnikov (Babintsev, Denisenko) – 16:00	2–1
	2–2	24:15 – Kotkaniemi (Akerman) (PP)
Sokolov (Zhilyakov) – 28:45	3–2
Denisenko (Zhilyakov, Zhabreyev) – 29:43	4–2
Kotkov (Khovanov) – 30:16	5–2
Khovanov (Kotkov) (EA) – 42:21	6–2

12 min
Penalties
7.5 min
19
Shots
20

Final Rank: (bronze)

== Luge ==
Individual sleds

Athlete	Event	Run 1		Run 2		Total	
Athlete	Event	Time	Rank	Time	Rank	Time	Rank
Evgeny Petrov	Boys	47.979	2	48.177	8	1:36.156	6
Olesya Mikhaylenko	Girls	53.315	4	53.299	6	1:46.614	5
Tatiana Tsvetova	Girls	53.324	5	53.282	5	1:46.606	4
Vsevolod Kashkin; Konstantin Korshunov	Doubles	52.896	4	52.376	2	1:45.272	3rd place, bronze medalist(s)

Mixed team relay

Athlete	Event	Girls		Boys		Doubles		Total	
Athlete	Event	Time	Rank	Time	Rank	Time	Rank	Time	Rank
Olesya Mikhaylenko; Evgeny Petrov; Vsevolod Kashkin; Konstantin Korshunov	Team relay	56.953	2	57.571	2	58.184	3	2:52.708	2nd place, silver medalist(s)

== Nordic combined ==
Individual

Athlete	Event	Ski jumping				Cross-country	
Athlete	Event	Distance	Points	Rank	Deficit	Time	Rank
Vitaly Ivanov	Normal hill/5 km	88.0	105.0	12	1:47	15:16.5	12

Nordic mixed team

Athlete	Event	Ski jumping			Cross-country	
Athlete	Event	Points	Rank	Deficit	Time	Rank
Sofia Tikhonova; Vitaly Ivanov; Maksim Sergeev; Maya Yakunina; Igor Fedotov	Nordic mixed team	349.6	4	0:35	26:16.9	1st place, gold medalist(s)

== Short track speed skating ==
Boys

Athlete	Event	Quarterfinal		Semifinal		Final	
Athlete	Event	Time	Rank	Time	Rank	Time	Rank
Pavel Sitnikov	500 m	42.652	2 SA/B	42.327	3 FB	42.731	5
Pavel Sitnikov	1000 m	PEN		did not advance			

Girls

Athlete	Event	Quarterfinal		Semifinal		Final	
Athlete	Event	Time	Rank	Time	Rank	Time	Rank
Elizaveta Kuznetsova	500 m	46.696	3 SC/D	46.755	1 FC	46.207	9
Elizaveta Kuznetsova	1000 m	1:47.402	2 SA/B	1:37.689	3 FB	1:42.378	7
Angelina Tarasova	500 m	48.093	2 SA/B	48.287	4 FB	47.861	4
Angelina Tarasova	1000 m	PEN		did not advance			

Mixed team relay

Athlete	Event	Semifinal		Final	
Athlete	Event	Time	Rank	Time	Rank
Team A April Shin (USA); Zang Yize (CHN); Pavel Sitnikov (RUS); András Sziklási (HUN)	Mixed team relay	4:18.683	3 FB	4:25.169	6
Team G Elizaveta Kuznetsova (RUS); Angelina Tarasova (RUS); Martinius Elvebakken (NOR); Hwang Dae-heon (KOR)	Mixed team relay	4:20.469	4 FB	4:23.553	5

Qualification Legend: FA=Final A (medal); FB=Final B (non-medal); FC=Final C (non-medal); FD=Final D (non-medal); SA/B=Semifinals A/B; SC/D=Semifinals C/D; ADV=Advanced to Next Round; PEN=Penalized

== Skeleton ==
Athlete	Event	Run 1		Run 2		Total	
Athlete	Event	Time	Rank	Time	Rank	Time	Rank
Alisher Mamedov	Boys	54.57	7	54.54	7	1:49.11	7
Evgenii Rukosuev	Boys	53.92	1	53.38	1	1:47.30	1st place, gold medalist(s)
Maria Surovtseva	Girls	57.29	14	56.81	11	1:54.10	12
Alina Tararychenkova	Girls	56.77	9	56.42	6	1:53.19	8

== Ski jumping ==
Individual

Athlete	Event	First round			Final			Total	
Athlete	Event	Distance	Points	Rank	Distance	Points	Rank	Points	Rank
Maksim Sergeev	Boys' normal hill	92.5	111.2	9	89.5	107.0	7	218.2	8
Sofia Tikhonova	Girls' normal hill	97.0	123.0	2	92.5	114.6	3	237.6	2nd place, silver medalist(s)

Team

Athlete	Event	First round		Final		Total	
Athlete	Event	Points	Rank	Points	Rank	Points	Rank
Sofia Tikhonova; Vitaly Ivanov; Maksim Sergeev	Team competition	328.2	4	324.8	4	653.0	4

== Snowboarding ==
Snowboard cross

Athlete	Event	Qualification		Group heats		Semifinal	Final
Athlete	Event	Time	Rank	Points	Rank	Position	Position
Vasily Loktev-Zagorskiy	Boys' snowboard cross	49.56	7 Q	13	8 Q	4 FB	6
Kristina Paul	Girls' snowboard cross	49.73	3 Q	18	3 Q	4 FB	5

Slopestyle

Athlete	Event	Final			
Athlete	Event	Run 1	Run 2	Best	Rank
Vlad Khadarin	Boys' slopestyle	84.25	90.25	90.25	2nd place, silver medalist(s)
Sofya Fedorova	Girls' slopestyle	63.00	41.00	63.00	9

Snowboard and ski cross relay

Athlete	Event	Quarterfinal	Semifinal	Final
Athlete	Event	Position	Position	Position
Kristina Paul; Dana Vovk; Vasily Loktev-Zagorskiy; Kirill Bagin	Team snowboard ski cross	3	did not advance	

Qualification legend: FA – Qualify to medal round; FB – Qualify to consolation round

== Speed skating ==
Boys

Athlete	Event	Race 1		Race 2		Final	
Athlete	Event	Time	Rank	Time	Rank	Time	Rank
Dmitrii Filimonov	500 m	37.54	12	36.83	2	74.381	7
Dmitrii Filimonov	1500 m	—N/a				1:54.22	6
Dmitrii Filimonov	Mass start	—N/a				5:55.85	19
Isa Izmailov	500 m	37.49	11	37.40	11	74.89	11
Isa Izmailov	1500 m	—N/a				1:56.66	14
Isa Izmailov	Mass start	—N/a				5:53.39	10

Girls

Athlete	Event	Race 1		Race 2		Final	
Athlete	Event	Time	Rank	Time	Rank	Time	Rank
Sofya Napolskikh	500 m	41.81	14	41.68	12	83.49	14
Sofya Napolskikh	1500 m	—N/a				2:07.18	7
Sofya Napolskikh	Mass start	—N/a				5:57.51	16
Elena Samkova	500 m	41.74	13	41.59	11	83.345	13
Elena Samkova	1500 m	—N/a				2:10.45	14
Elena Samkova	Mass start	—N/a				5:58.43	18

Mixed team sprint

Athletes	Event	Final	
Athletes	Event	Time	Rank
Team 1 Jasmin Guentert (SUI); Kim Min-sun (KOR); Isa Izmailov (RUS); Jeffrey Rosanelli (ITA)	Mixed team sprint	1:59.75	7
Team 8 Natalie Kerschbaummayr (CZE); Moe Kumagai (JPN); Dmitrii Filimonov (RUS); Kaspar Kaljuvee (EST)	Mixed team sprint	DSQ	
Team 13; Sofya Napolskikh (RUS); Elena Samkova (RUS); Jaakko Hautamäki (FIN); Kim Min-seok (KOR)	Mixed team sprint	1:58.97	5

== See also ==
- Russia at the 2016 Summer Olympics
