= Ice hockey at the 2016 Winter Youth Olympics – Boys' tournament =

2016 Winter Youth Olympics – Boys' tournament
Tournament details
- Host country: Norway
- Venues: 2 (in 1 host city)
- Dates: 12–21 February
- Teams: 5

Final positions
- Champions: United States (1st title)
- Runners-up: Canada
- Third place: Russia
- Fourth place: Finland

Tournament statistics
- Games played: 14
- Goals scored: 97 (6.93 per game)
- Attendance: 20,103 (1,436 per game)
- Scoring leader: (Russia) Andrei Svechnikov (10 points)

The boys' ice hockey tournament at the 2016 Winter Youth Olympics was held from 12 to 21 February at the Kristins Hall and the Youth Hall in Lillehammer, Norway.

== Preliminary round ==
All times are local (UTC+1).

Pos	Team	Pld	W	SOW	SOL	L	GF	GA	GD	Pts	Qualification
1	Canada	4	3	0	0	1	18	7	+11	9 (Note: Canada 4–2 United States)	Semifinals
2	United States	4	3	0	0	1	18	7	+11	9	Semifinals
3	Russia	4	2	1	0	1	21	9	+12	8	Semifinals
4	Finland	4	1	0	1	2	14	11	+3	4	Semifinals
5	Norway (H)	4	0	0	0	4	1	38	−37	0	

Source: IIHF
(H) Host
Notes:

12 February 2016; 14:00	Finland	11–0 (5–0, 2–0, 4–0)	Norway	Youth Hall; Attendance: 550

Game reference

Justus Annunen
Goalies
Kristian Hovik
Referee:
(Czech Republic) Daniel Pražák
Linesmen:
(United Kingdom) Danny Beresford
(Belarus) Aleh Kliashcheunikau

Moilanen (Maki, Salonen) – 05:53	1–0
Maki (Salonen, Kupari) – 08:38	2–0
Nordgren (Matikainen, Moilanen) –09:56	3–0
Nevasaari (Kotkaniemi, Moilanen) – 11:02	4–0
Utunen (Kotkaniemi, Moilanen) (PP) – 12:59	5–0
Maki (Hirvonen) – 22:17	6–0
Nevasaari (Moilanen) – 25:24	7–0
Nordgren (Matikainen) (SH) – 35:28	8–0
Nordgren (Hirvonen, Rannisto) – 38:38	9–0
Kukkonen (Utunen, Nordgren) – 38:59	10–0
Nordgren (Ruikka) – 39:56	11–0

12 min
Penalties
7.5 min
36
Shots
3

13 February 2016; 17:00	Canada	3–4 (0–2, 1–0, 2–2)	Russia	Kristins Hall; Attendance: 1,755

Game reference

Olivier Rodrigue
Goalies
Amir Miftakhov
Referee:
(Sweden) Lars Johan Gossas
Linesmen:
(Denmark) Niclas Lundsgaard
(Norway) Thomas Nordberg Pettersen

	0–1	02:04 – Sokolov (Svechnikov, Kotkov) (PP)
	0-2	05:20 – Svechnikov (Khovanov, Kotkov)
Smith (Dudas) (PP) – 27:37	1–2
	1–3	30:37 – Kotkov (Svechnikov, Khovanov)
	1–4	34:39 – Khovanov
McShane – 44:12	2–4
Burzan (EA) – 44:55	3–4

3 min
Penalties
4.5 min
40
Shots
21

13 February 2016; 20:00	United States	4–1 (2–1, 1–0, 1–0)	Finland	Kristins Hall; Attendance: 890

Game reference

Todd Scott
Goalies
Jimi Uusitalo
Referee:
(Switzerland) Alex DiPietro
Linesmen:
(France) Clément Goncalves
(Sweden) Tobias Nordlander

	0–1	02:36 – Salonen (Maki)
Wise (DeBoer, Krygier) – 08:39	1–1
Walsh (Emberson) – 13:10	2–1
Krygier (MacKinnon) – 20:25	3–1
Weiss (PS) – 42:12	4–1

4.5 min
Penalties
7.5 min
24
Shots
22

14 February 2016; 20:00	Norway	0–8 (0–3, 0–4, 0–1)	United States	Kristins Hall; Attendance: 2,094

Game reference

Theo Rooseboom de Vries
Goalies
Drew DeRidder
Referee:
(Germany) Marc Iwert
Linesmen:
(Belarus) Aleh Kliashcheunikau
(Denmark) Niclas Lundsgaard

0–1	06:48 – Wahlstrom (Weiss, DeBoer) (PP)
0–2	11:09 – Wahlstrom (Weiss, Wise)
0–3	11:49 – Pivonka (Middendorf, Emberson)
0–4	17:09 – Pivonka (Walsh, M. Samuelsson) (PP)
0–5	21:35 – Middendorf (Krygier, Pivonka) (SH)
0–6	23:04 – Pivonka (Middendorf, Semik)
0–7	24:48 – DeBoer (Wise, Weiss)
0–8	30:31 – Wahlstrom (Wise, Weiss)

7.5 min
Penalties
6 min
11
Shots
35

15 February 2016; 17:00	Canada	5–1 (2–1, 1–0, 2–0)	Finland	Kristins Hall; Attendance: 950

Game reference

Alexis Gravel
Goalies
Justus Annunen
Referee:
(Czech Republic) Daniel Pražák
Linesmen:
(United Kingdom) Danny Beresford
(Norway) Thomas Nordberg Pettersen

Dudas (Focht) (PP) – 01:46	1–0
Roberts (McShane, Burzan) – 02:20	2–0
	2–1	12:03 – Utunen (Kotkaniemi) (PP2)
Burzan – 16:03	3–1
Groulx (SH) – 30:50	4–1
Smith (PP) – 38:52	5–1

20.5 min
Penalties
9 min
28
Shots
25

15 February 2016; 20:00	Russia	13–1 (4–0, 3–0, 6–1)	Norway	Kristins Hall; Attendance: 1,198

Game reference

Georgi Dubrovski
Goalies
Kristian Hovik
Referee:
(Switzerland) Alex DiPietro
Linesmen:
(France) Clément Goncalves
(Sweden) Tobias Nordlander

Zhabreyev (Denisenko) – 03:17	1–0
Zhabreyev (Kupchikhin, Nizhnikov) – 11:01	2–0
Svechnikov (Khovanov, Zhilyakov) – 11:27	3–0
Svechnikov (Sitdikov) – 13:43	4–0
Zhabreyev (Svechnikov) (SH) – 21:01	5–0
Denezhkin (Sokolov) – 24:45	6–0
Svechnikov (Zhabreyev) – 29:59	7–0
	7–1	30:42 – Pettersen (Beier Jensen, Skramo)
Khovanov (Svechnikov) – 31:55	8–1
Nizhnikov (Denisenko) – 33:48	9–1
Nizhnikov (Denisenko, Zhabreyev) – 37:05	10–1
Svechnikov (Khovanov, Sokolov) (PP) – 38:34	11–1
Sokolov (Rotenberg) – 42:41	12–1
Denisenko (Zhuravlyov, Zhabreyev) – 43:36	13–1

19 min
Penalties
6 min
51
Shots
10

16 February 2016; 14:00	United States	2–4 (2–1, 0–2, 0–1)	Canada	Kristins Hall; Attendance: 1,745

Game reference

Todd Scott
Goalies
Alexis Gravel
Referee:
(Sweden) Lars Johan Gossas
Linesmen:
(Belarus) Aleh Kliashcheunikau
(Sweden) Tobias Nordlander

	0–1	02:45 – McShane (McIsaac)
Weiss (Semik, Wise) (PP) – 09:40	1–1
Wise (Walsh, DeBoer) – 14:36	2–1
	2–2	21:52 – Fortier (Roberts, McShane)
	2–3	26:42 – Roberts (Focht, MacDonald)
	2–4	38:09 – Burzan (Dudas)

6 min
Penalties
6 min
23
Shots
20

16 February 2016; 17:00	Finland	1–2 GWS (0–1, 1–0, 0–0) (SO: 0–1)	Russia	Kristins Hall; Attendance: 653

Game reference
Jimi Uusitalo	Goalies	Amir Miftakhov	Referee: (Germany) Marc Iwert; Linesmen: (Denmark) Niclas Lundgaard (Norway) Thomas Nordberg Pettersen
/ 0–1 / 02:11 – Svechnikov (Khovanov); Kotkaniemi (Utunen, Nevasaari) – 26:26 / 1–1			Referee: (Germany) Marc Iwert; Linesmen: (Denmark) Niclas Lundgaard (Norway) Thomas Nordberg Pettersen
Salonen (miss); Kotkaniemi (miss); Maki (miss); Nevasaari; Nevasaari (miss); Ruikka (miss)	Shootout	(miss) Khovanov; (miss) Svechnikov; (miss) Zhabreyev; Khovanov; (miss) Denezhkin; Khovanov	Referee: (Germany) Marc Iwert; Linesmen: (Denmark) Niclas Lundgaard (Norway) Thomas Nordberg Pettersen
9 min	Penalties	9 min	Referee: (Germany) Marc Iwert; Linesmen: (Denmark) Niclas Lundgaard (Norway) Thomas Nordberg Pettersen
21	Shots	16	Referee: (Germany) Marc Iwert; Linesmen: (Denmark) Niclas Lundgaard (Norway) Thomas Nordberg Pettersen

18 February 2016; 17:00	Norway	0–6 (0–1, 0–3, 0–2)	Canada	Kristins Hall; Attendance: 2,250

Game reference

Theo Rooseboom de Vries
Goalies
Olivier Rodrigue
Referee:
(Germany) Marc Iwert
Linesmen:
(United Kingdom) Danny Beresford
(France) Clément Goncalves

0–1	06:02 – Roberts (Burzan, McIsaac) (PP)
0–2	18:32 – Focht (Nielsen, Smith)
0–3	25:19 – Burzan (Chisholm)
0–4	25:57 – McIsaac (Fortier) (SH)
0–5	30:29 – McShane (Smith, Busby)
0–6	44:43 – Groulx (Chisholm, McIsaac) (PP)

9 min
Penalties
4.5 min
2
Shots
37

18 February 2016; 17:00	Russia	2–4 (0–2, 1–0, 1–2)	United States	Youth Hall; Attendance: 564

Game reference

Amir Miftakhov
Goalies
Drew DeRidder
Referee:
(Switzerland) Alex DiPietro
Linesmen:
(Denmark) Niclas Lundgaard
(Sweden) Tobias Nordlander

	0–1	04:16 – Weiss (Wahlstrom)
	0–2	12:25 – DeBoer (Wise, Walsh)
Zhabreyev (Babintsev, Denisenko) – 22:38	1–2
	1–3	31:25 – Pivonka (Weiss)
	1–4	39:06 – Gruden (MacKinnon, Middendorf)
Nizhnikov (Denezhkin) – 42:46	2–4

26.5 min
Penalties
10.5 min
24
Shots
20

== Playoff round ==
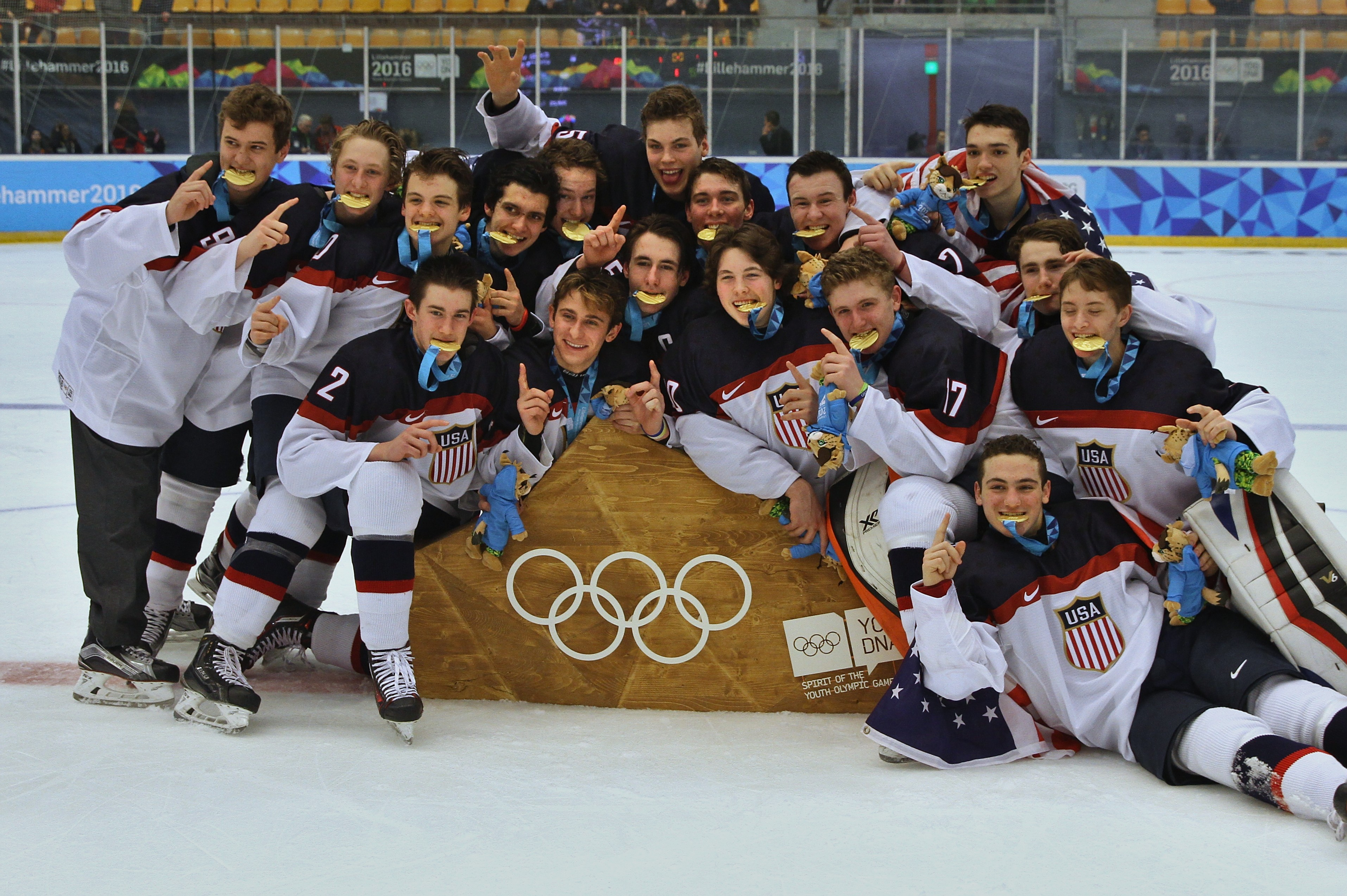
Lillehammer 2016 winners

=== Bracket ===
Semifinals
19 February
Canada (GWS)	4
Finland	3
19 February
United States	3
Russia	0

Final
21 February
Canada	2
United States	5
Third place
20 February
Russia	6
Finland	2

=== Semifinals ===
19 February 2016; 17:00	Canada	4–3 GWS (0–1, 2–1, 1–1) (SO: 1–0)	Finland	Kristins Hall; Attendance: 1,472

Game reference

Alexis Gravel
Goalies
Jimi Uusitalo
Referee:
(Czech Republic) Daniel Pražák
Linesmen:
(France) Clément Goncalves
(Belarus) Aleh Kliashcheunikau

	0–1	14:53 – Utunen (Kotkaniemi, Nordgren) (PP2)
	0–2	15:30 – Moilanen (Nordgren, Utunen) (PP2)
Focht (Groulx, Merkley) (SH) – 18:59	1–2
MacDonald (Merkley, Burzan) – 21:22	2–2
	2–3	39:10 – Kotkaniemi (Rannisto, Nordgren)
Groulx (Merkley, Focht) (PP) – 41:32	3–3

Groulx
MacDonald (miss)
Merkley
Shootout
(miss) Nordgren
(miss) Nevasaari
23.5 min
Penalties
7.5 min
21
Shots
29

19 February 2016; 20:00	United States	3–0 (0–0, 1–0, 2–0)	Russia	Kristins Hall; Attendance: 1,902

Game reference

Drew DeRidder
Goalies
Amir Miftakhov
Referee:
(Sweden) Lars Johan Gossas
Linesmen:
(United Kingdom) Danny Beresford
(Norway) Thomas Nordberg Pettersen

Pivonka (Middendorf, Savage) – 19:41	1–0
Wise (Gruden) (SH, EN) – 43:18	2–0
Walsh (Wise) – 44:30	3–0

6 min
Penalties
13 min
23
Shots
19

=== Bronze medal game ===
20 February 2016; 20:00	Russia	6–2 (1–1, 3–1, 2–0)	Finland	Kristins Hall; Attendance: 1,652

Game reference

Amir Miftakhov
Goalies
Justus Annunen
Referee:
(Germany) Marc Iwert
Linesmen:
(Belarus) Aleh Kliashcheunikau
(Norway) Thomas Nordberg Pettersen

	0–1	00:30 – Kupari (Nevasaari)
Zhuravlyov (Denisenko, Zhabreyev) (PP) – 08:28	1–1
Nizhnikov (Babintsev, Denisenko) – 16:00	2–1
	2–2	24:15 – Kotkaniemi (Akerman) (PP)
Sokolov (Zhilyakov) – 28:45	3–2
Denisenko (Zhilyakov, Zhabreyev) – 29:43	4–2
Kotkov (Khovanov) – 30:16	5–2
Khovanov (Kotkov) (EA) – 42:21	6–2

12 min
Penalties
7.5 min
19
Shots
20

=== Gold medal game ===
21 February 2016; 15:00	Canada	2–5 (0–1, 1–2, 1–2)	United States	Kristins Hall; Attendance: 2,428

Game reference

Alexis Gravel
Olivier Rodrigue
Goalies
Drew DeRidder
Referee:
(Switzerland) Alex DiPietro
Linesmen:
(Denmark) Niclas Lundgaard
(Sweden) Tobias Nordlander

	0–1	08:00 – Walsh (Gruden, DeBoer)
	0–2	17:56 – DeBoer (Pivonka, Semik) (PP)
Merkley (Focht) (PP) – 24:32	1–2
	1–3	26:25 – Krygier (MacKinnon, Gruden)
McShane (Busby, Smith) – 41:11	2–3
	2–4	44:04 – Weiss (EN)
	2–5	44:41 – Wise (Pivonka) (PP, EN)

7.5 min
Penalties
4.5 min
25
Shots
23

== Final ranking ==
Pos	Grp	Team	Pld	W	SOW	SOL	L	GF	GA	GD	Pts
1	A	United States	6	5	0	0	1	26	9	+17	15
2	B	Canada	6	3	1	0	2	24	15	+9	11
3	A	Russia	6	3	1	0	2	27	14	+13	11
4	B	Finland	6	1	0	2	3	19	21	−2	5
5	B	Norway (H)	4	0	0	0	4	1	38	−37	0

Source: Lillehammer 2016
(H) Host
