= United States men's national under-16 ice hockey team =

United States
- Nickname: Team USA
- Association: USA Hockey
- Head coach: Joe Bonnett
- Assistants: Jason Guerriero; Matt Gilroy; Dave Caruso
- Captain: Jimmy Snuggerud
- Most games: 28 Players (6)
- Top scorer: Jacob Pivonka (5)
- Most points: Jake Wise (10)
- Team colors
- IIHF code: USA
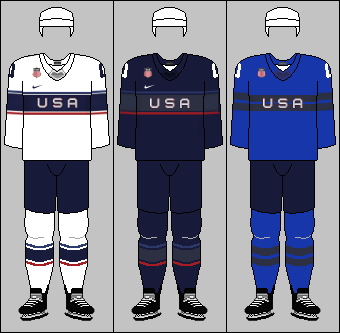

First international
- United States 7–2 Australia (Innsbruck, Austria; January 13, 2012)

Biggest win
- United States 8–0 Norway (Lillehammer, Norway; February 14, 2016)

Biggest defeat
- Russia 7–1 United States (Innsbruck, Austria; January 18, 2012)

Youth Olympics
- Appearances: 4 (first in 2012)
- Best result: Gold: (2016, 2024)

Medal record

Youth Olympic Games
Gold medal – first place	2016 Lillehammer	Team
Gold medal – first place	2024 Gangwon	Team
Silver medal – second place	2020 Lausanne	Team

The United States men's national under-16 ice hockey team represents the United States at the Youth Olympic Games.

== History ==
The team won two gold medals in 2016 & 2024 and a silver medal in 2020. Several National Hockey League (NHL) prospects, such as Jack Eichel and Nick Schmaltz, have played on this team.

== Competitive record ==
=== Youth Olympic Games ===
Year	Result	Rank	GP	W	SOW	SOL	L	GF	GA	Pts
(Austria) 2012	Fourth place	4th	6	2	0	0	4	21	30	6
(Norway) 2016	Gold medal	1st place, gold medalist(s)	6	5	0	0	1	26	9	15
(Switzerland) 2020	Silver medal	2nd place, silver medalist(s)	4	3	0	0	1	17	12	9
(South Korea) 2024	Gold medal	1st place, gold medalist(s)	4	1	2	1	0	20	15	8
Total	2 Titles	4/4	20	11	2	1	6	84	66	38
