= Alpine skiing at the 2016 Winter Youth Olympics – Parallel mixed team =

Parallel mixed team at the II Winter Youth Olympic Games
- Venue: Hafjell
- Date: 20 February
- Competitors: 32 from 16 nations

Medalists
| 1st place, gold medalist(s) | | Lucia Rispler; Jonas Stockinger | Germany |
| 2nd place, silver medalist(s) | | Anastasiia Silanteva; Aleksey Konkov | Russia |
| 3rd place, bronze medalist(s) | | Riikka Honkanen; Sampo Kankkunen | Finland |

The parallel mixed team competition of the 2016 Winter Youth Olympics was held at the Hafjell Olympic Slope on 20 February.

== Participants ==
| Bib | Name | Country |
|---|---|---|
| 11; 12 | Kajsa Vickhoff Lie; Henrik Thorsby | Norway |
| 21; 22 | Mélanie Meillard; Maurus Sparr | Switzerland |
| 31; 32 | Nadine Fest; Manuel Traninger | Austria |
| 41; 42 | Carlotta Saracco; Pietro Canzio | Italy |
| 51; 52 | Meta Hrovat; Anže Čufar | Slovenia |
| 61; 62 | Kenza Lacheb; Léo Anguenot | France |
| 71; 72 | Lucia Rispler; Jonas Stockinger | Germany |
| 81; 82 | Ali Nullmeyer; Justin Alkier | Canada |
| 91; 92 | Keely Cashman; River Radamus | United States |
| 101; 102 | Jonna Luthman; Filip Vennerström | Sweden |
| 111; 112 | Riikka Honkanen; Sampo Kankkunen | Finland |
| 121; 122 | Lana Zbašnik; Samuel Kolega | Croatia |
| 131; 132 | Anastasiia Silanteva; Aleksey Konkov | Russia |
| 141; 142 | Chisaki Maeda; Yohei Koyama | Japan |
| 151; 152 | Kim Vanreusel; Sam Maes | Belgium |
| 161; 162 | Andrea Louise Arnold; Jan Zabystřan | Czech Republic |

== Bracket ==
Round of 16
Norway | 2*
Czech Republic | 2
Canada | 2*
United States | 2
Slovenia | 2*
Croatia | 2
Italy | 0
Russia | 4
Austria | 2*
Japan | 2
France | 1
Finland | 3
Germany | 2*
Sweden | 2
Switzerland | 3
Belgium | 1

Quarterfinals
Norway | 2
Canada | 2*
Slovenia | 2
Russia | 2*
Austria | 2
Finland | 2*
Germany | 2*
Switzerland | 2

Semifinals
Canada | 2
Russia | 2*
Finland | 2
Germany | 2*

Final
Russia | 1
Germany | 3
Third place
Canada | 1
Finland | 3

== External list ==
- Bracket
