= Riikka Honkanen =

Finnish alpine skier (born 1998)

Personal information
- Born: 17 July 1998 (age 28) Klaukkala, Finland

Skiing career
- Sport: Alpine skiing ♀
- Disciplines: Slalom, giant slalom
- World Cup debut: 30 January 2016 (age 17)

Olympics
- Teams: 1 – (2022)

World Championships
- Teams: 3 – (2017–2021)

World Cup
- Seasons: 6 – (2018–2023)
- Overall titles: 0 – (123rd in 2022)
- Discipline titles: 0 – (55th in SL, 2022)
Medal record
Women's alpine skiing
Representing Finland
Junior World Championships
| Silver medal – second place | 2016 Sochi | Giant slalom |
| Bronze medal – third place | 2018 Davos | Giant slalom |
Youth Olympic Games
| Bronze medal – third place | 2016 Lillehammer | Parallel Mixed Team |

Riikka Honkanen (born 17 July 1998) is a Finnish alpine ski racer.

== World Cup results ==
=== Season standings ===
| Season | Age | Overall | Slalom | Giant Slalom | Super G | Downhill | Combined |
|---|---|---|---|---|---|---|---|
| 2019 | 20 | 137 | — | 60 | — | — | — |
| 2020 | 21 | Didn't earn a World Cup point | | | | | |
| 2021 | 22 | Didn't earn a World Cup point | | | | | |
| 2022 | 23 | 123 | 55 | — | — | — | — |

=== Results per discipline ===
| Discipline | WC starts | WC Top 30 | WC Top 15 | WC Top 5 | WC Podium | Best result | | |
| Discipline | WC starts | WC Top 30 | WC Top 15 | WC Top 5 | WC Podium | Date | Location | Place |
|---|---|---|---|---|---|---|---|---|
| Slalom | 24 | 1 | 0 | 0 | 0 | 21 November 2021 | Levi, Finland | 28th |
| Giant slalom | 17 | 1 | 0 | 0 | 0 | 8 March 2019 | Špindlerův Mlýn, Czech Republic | 30th |
| Super-G | 0 | 0 | 0 | 0 | 0 | | | |
| Downhill | 0 | 0 | 0 | 0 | 0 | | | |
| Combined | 0 | 0 | 0 | 0 | 0 | | | |
| Parallel | 1 | 0 | 0 | 0 | 0 | 26 November 2020 | Lech / Zürs, Austria | 42nd |
| Total | 42 | 2 | 0 | 0 | 0 | | | |

- Standings through 5 March 2023

== World Championship results ==
Year
| Year | Age | Slalom | Giant; Slalom | Super G | Downhill | Combined | Parallel | Team Event |
| 2017 | 18 | DNF2 | 34 | — | — | — | —N/a | — |
| 2019 | 20 | DNF1 | 29 | — | — | — | —N/a | 9 |
| 2021 | 22 | DNF1 | DNF2 | — | — | — | 40 | 9 |

== Other results ==
=== European Cup results ===
==== Season standings ====
| Season | Age | Overall | Slalom | Giant slalom | Super-G | Downhill | Combined |
|---|---|---|---|---|---|---|---|
| 2016 | 17 | 106 | 67 | 48 | — | — | — |
| 2017 | 18 | 111 | 63 | 48 | — | — | — |
| 2018 | 19 | 122 | 67 | 57 | — | — | — |
| 2019 | 20 | 84 | 59 | 41 | — | — | — |
| 2020 | 21 | 106 | 83 | 43 | — | — | 33 |
| 2021 | 22 | 132 | — | 52 | — | — | — |
| 2022 | 23 | 114 | 41 | — | — | — | — |
| 2023 | 24 | 117 | 42 | 65 | — | — | — |

==== Results per discipline ====
| Discipline | EC starts | EC Top 30 | EC Top 15 | EC Top 5 | EC Podium | Best result | | |
| Discipline | EC starts | EC Top 30 | EC Top 15 | EC Top 5 | EC Podium | Date | Location | Place |
|---|---|---|---|---|---|---|---|---|
| Slalom | 42 | 15 | 1 | 0 | 0 | 29 November 2022 | Mayrhofen, Austria | 10th |
| Giant slalom | 44 | 18 | 3 | 0 | 0 | 16 March 2019 | Folgaria, Italy | 10th |
| Super-G | 2 | 0 | 0 | 0 | 0 | 19 February 2020 | Sarentino, Italy | 31st |
| Downhill | 1 | 0 | 0 | 0 | 0 | 11 February 2021 | Santa Caterina, Italy | 71st |
| Combined | 1 | 1 | 0 | 0 | 0 | 21 February 2020 | Sarentino, Italy | 22nd |
| Total | 90 | 34 | 4 | 0 | 0 | | | |

- Standings through 5 March 2023

=== Far East Cup results ===
==== Season standings ====
| Season | Age | Overall | Slalom | Giant slalom | Super-G | Downhill | Combined |
|---|---|---|---|---|---|---|---|
| 2020 | 21 | 4 | 3 | 7 | — | — | — |

==== Results per discipline ====
| Discipline | FEC starts | FEC Top 30 | FEC Top 15 | FEC Top 5 | FEC Podium | Best result | | |
| Discipline | FEC starts | FEC Top 30 | FEC Top 15 | FEC Top 5 | FEC Podium | Date | Location | Place |
|---|---|---|---|---|---|---|---|---|
| Slalom | 3 | 3 | 3 | 3 | 3 | 14 February 2020 | Bears Town, South Korea | 2nd |
| Giant slalom | 3 | 3 | 3 | 3 | 3 | 6 February 2020 | Yongpyong Resort, South Korea | 1st |
| Super-G | 0 | 0 | 0 | 0 | 0 | | | |
| Downhill | 0 | 0 | 0 | 0 | 0 | | | |
| Combined | 0 | 0 | 0 | 0 | 0 | | | |
| Total | 6 | 6 | 6 | 6 | 6 | | | |

- Standings through 25 January 2021

==== Race podiums ====
- 1 win – (1 GS)
- 6 podiums – (3 SL, 3 GS)

Season
| Season | Date | Location | Discipline | Place |
| 2020 | 6 February 2020 | Yongpyong Resort, South Korea | Giant slalom | 1st |
| 2020 | 7 February 2020 | Yongpyong Resort, South Korea | Slalom | 3rd |
| 2020 | 11 February 2020 | Bears Town, South Korea | Giant slalom | 3rd |
| 2020 | 12 February 2020 | Bears Town, South Korea | Giant slalom | 3rd |
| 2020 | 13 February 2020 | Bears Town, South Korea | Slalom | 3rd |
| 2020 | 14 February 2020 | Bears Town, South Korea | Slalom | 2nd |

=== South American Cup results ===
==== Season standings ====
| Season | Age | Overall | Slalom | Giant slalom | Super-G | Downhill | Combined |
|---|---|---|---|---|---|---|---|
| 2020 | 21 | 23 | — | 13 | — | — | — |

==== Results per discipline ====
| Discipline | SAC starts | SAC Top 30 | SAC Top 15 | SAC Top 5 | SAC Podium | Best result | | |
| Discipline | SAC starts | SAC Top 30 | SAC Top 15 | SAC Top 5 | SAC Podium | Date | Location | Place |
|---|---|---|---|---|---|---|---|---|
| Slalom | 1 | 1 | 1 | 1 | 1 | 18 September 2019 | Cerro Castor, Argentina | 3rd |
| Giant slalom | 0 | 0 | 0 | 0 | 0 | | | |
| Super-G | 0 | 0 | 0 | 0 | 0 | | | |
| Downhill | 0 | 0 | 0 | 0 | 0 | | | |
| Combined | 0 | 0 | 0 | 0 | 0 | | | |
| Total | 1 | 1 | 1 | 1 | 1 | | | |

- Standings through 26 January 2021

==== Race podiums ====
- 1 podium – (GS)

Season
| Season | Date | Location | Discipline | Place |
| 2020 | 18 September 2019 | Cerro Castor, Argentina | Giant slalom | 3rd |
