= Mattias Samuelsson =

Swedish-American ice hockey player (born 2000)

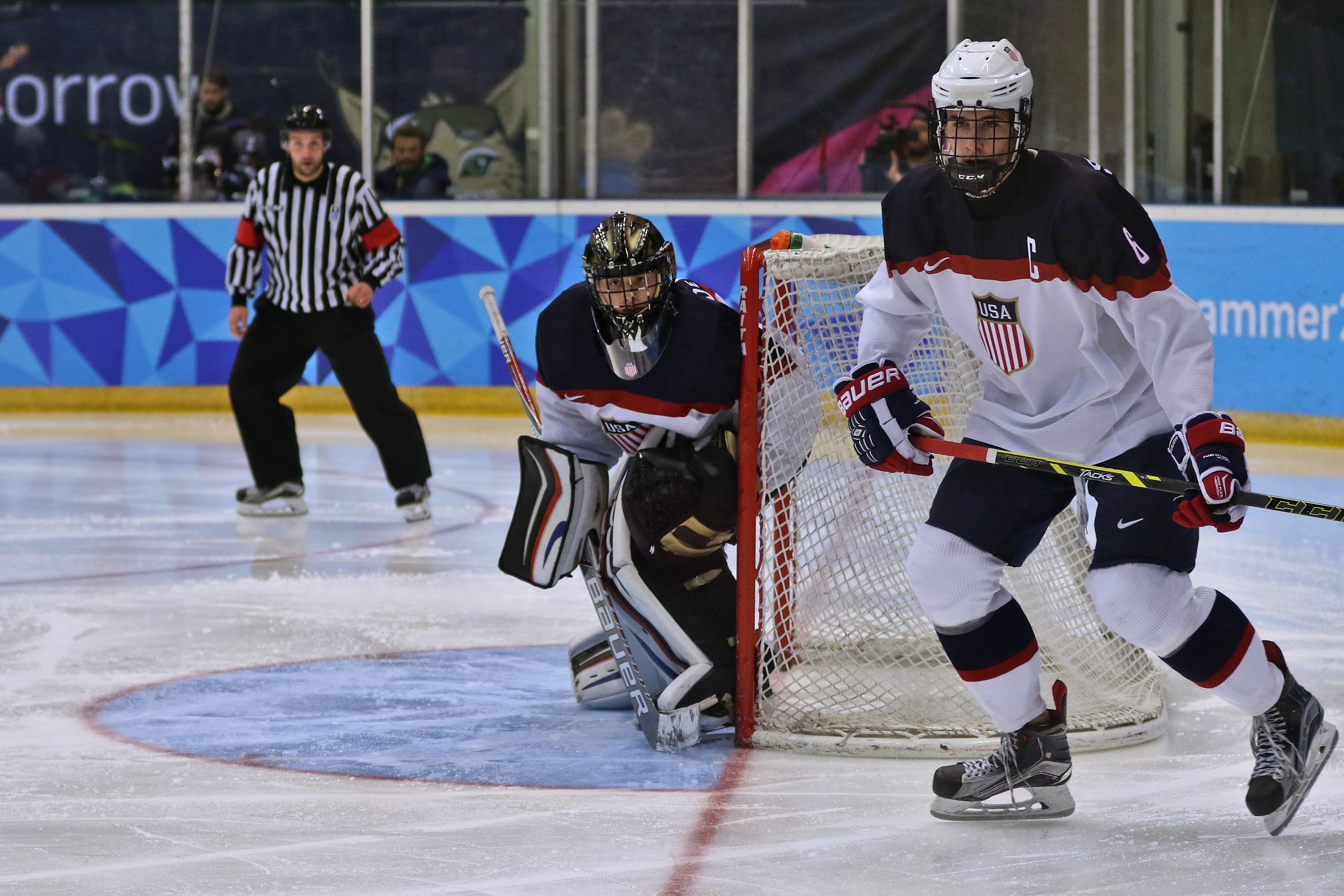
- Samuelsson at the 2016 Winter Youth Olympics
- Born: March 14, 2000 (age 26) Philadelphia, Pennsylvania, U.S.
- Height: 6 ft 4 in (193 cm)
- Weight: 229 lb (104 kg; 16 st 5 lb)
- Position: Defense
- Shoots: Left
- NHL team: Buffalo Sabres
- NHL draft: 32nd overall, 2018; Buffalo Sabres
- Playing career: 2021–present

Mattias Samuelsson (born March 14, 2000) is a Swedish-American professional ice hockey player who is a defenseman and alternate captain for the Buffalo Sabres of the National Hockey League (NHL). He played college ice hockey with Western Michigan University.

== Playing career ==
=== Junior ===
Samuelsson was drafted by the Sarnia Sting in the fourth round of the 2016 Ontario Hockey League draft, but chose not to play there.

=== College ===
After originally committing to the University of Michigan, Samuelsson de-committed and went to Western Michigan University instead. He played two seasons at Western Michigan, where he recorded seven goals and 19 assists. He was an alternate captain for the team in his sophomore year, despite being the youngest player on the team.

=== Professional ===
Samuelsson was drafted in the second round, 32nd overall, by the Buffalo Sabres in the 2018 NHL entry draft. He signed a three-year, entry-level contract with the Sabres on March 25, 2020.

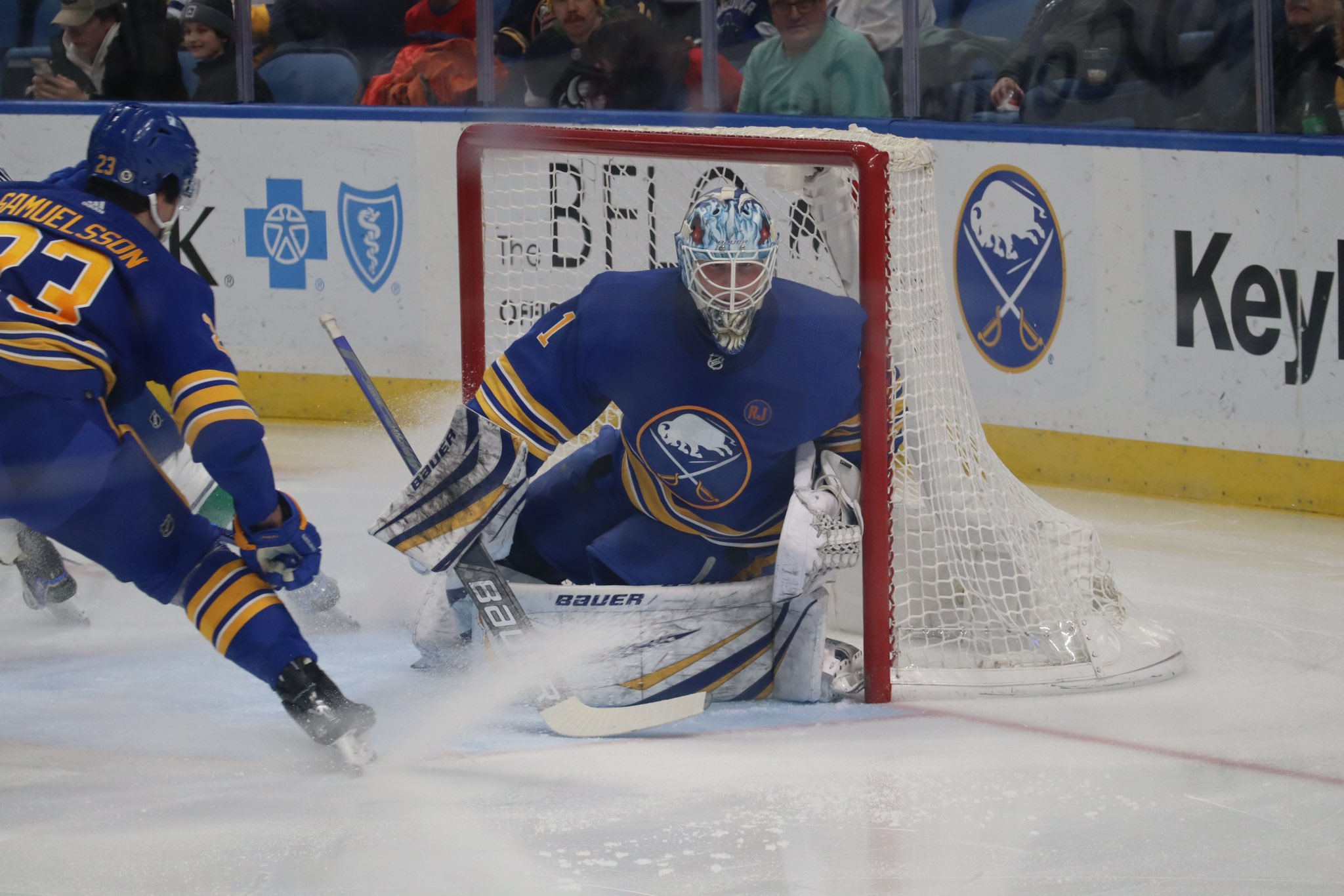
Samuelsson (left) in action with the Buffalo Sabres.

Samuelsson made his NHL debut with the Sabres on April 18, 2021, in a 4–2 win against the Pittsburgh Penguins.

On October 12, 2022, he was signed to a seven-year, $30 million contract extension. Samuelsson scored his first NHL goal on November 30, in a 5–4 shootout win over the Detroit Red Wings.

On February 4, 2024, Samuelsson was ruled out for the rest of the 2023–24 season due to an injury sustained in a January 23 game against the Anaheim Ducks. During the season he recorded one goal and six assists for seven points in 41 games.

== International play ==
In 2016, at the second Winter Youth Olympics, Samuelsson captained team USA and won gold in the boys' tournament. Samuelsson played three seasons with the USA Hockey National Team Development Program. He was part of the team that won the silver medal at the 2019 World Junior Ice Hockey Championships, and was captain of the team at the 2020 World Junior Ice Hockey Championships.

== Personal life ==
Samuelsson's father, Kjell, played 14 seasons as an NHL defenseman for the Pittsburgh Penguins, Philadelphia Flyers, New York Rangers and Tampa Bay Lightning. His mother Vicki is a Pennsylvania native.

He and his siblings were raised in Voorhees Township, New Jersey. At Western Michigan, Samulesson played alongside his older brother Lukas.

Samuelsson grew up modeling his game after that of longtime NHL defensemen Mattias Ekholm and Victor Hedman.

== Career statistics ==
=== Regular season and playoffs ===
			Regular season					Playoffs
Season	Team	League	GP	G	A	Pts	PIM	GP	G	A	Pts	PIM
2015–16	Northwood School	USHS	47	14	15	29	18	—	—	—	—	—
2016–17	U.S. National Development Team	USHL	30	5	5	10	26	—	—	—	—	—
2017–18	U.S. National Development Team	USHL	23	4	10	14	64	—	—	—	—	—
2018–19	Western Michigan University	NCHC	35	5	7	12	37	—	—	—	—	—
2019–20	Western Michigan University	NCHC	30	2	12	14	41	—	—	—	—	—
2020–21	Rochester Americans	AHL	23	3	10	13	12	—	—	—	—	—
2020–21	Buffalo Sabres	NHL	12	0	2	2	4	—	—	—	—	—
2021–22	Rochester Americans	AHL	22	2	13	15	16	—	—	—	—	—
2021–22	Buffalo Sabres	NHL	42	0	10	10	16	—	—	—	—	—
2022–23	Buffalo Sabres	NHL	55	2	8	10	20	—	—	—	—	—
2023–24	Buffalo Sabres	NHL	41	1	6	7	26	—	—	—	—	—
2024–25	Buffalo Sabres	NHL	62	4	10	14	22	—	—	—	—	—
2025–26	Buffalo Sabres	NHL	78	13	28	41	28	13	3	4	7	2
NHL totals			290	20	64	84	116	13	3	4	7	2

=== International ===
Medal record

Representing United States

Ice hockey

Winter Youth Olympics
Gold medal – first place	2016 Lillehammer	

World Junior Championships
Silver medal – second place	2019 Canada	

World U18 Championships
Silver medal – second place	2018 Russia	

Year	Team	Event	Result	GP	G	A	Pts	PIM
2016	United States	YOG	1st place, gold medalist(s)	6	0	1	1	0
2018	United States	U18	2nd place, silver medalist(s)	7	1	1	2	6
2019	United States	WJC	2nd place, silver medalist(s)	7	0	0	0	0
2020	United States	WJC	6th	5	0	0	0	6
Junior totals				25	1	2	3	12

== Awards and honors ==
Award	Year	Ref
College
NCHC Honorable Mention All-Star Team	2020	
