= Maxim Denezhkin =

Russian ice hockey player

- Born: 10 December 2000 (age 25) Yaroslavl, Russia
- Height: 5 ft 10 in (178 cm)
- Weight: 165 lb (75 kg; 11 st 11 lb)
- Position: Centre
- Shoots: Left
- KHL team Former teams: Avtomobilist Yekaterinburg; Lokomotiv Yaroslavl
- NHL draft: 193rd overall, 2019; Edmonton Oilers
- Playing career: 2018–present

Maxim Alekseyevich Denezhkin (Russian: Максим Алексеевич Денежкин; born 10 December 2000) is a Russian professional ice hockey forward who is currently playing with Avtomobilist Yekaterinburg of the Kontinental Hockey League (KHL).

== Playing career ==
Denezkhin played as a youth for the Loko Yaroslavl in the Molodezhnaya Hokkeinaya Liga (MHL). He also played one game for Lokomotiv Yaroslavl in the KHL in the 2018–19 season.

Denezhkin was selected by the Edmonton Oilers in the 2019 NHL entry draft.

Limited to just 1 game with Lokomotiv Yaroslavl during the 2020–21 season, Denezhkin left the club in the off-season as he was traded to VHL club, HC Lada Togliatti, in exchange for Stepan Steshenko on 9 August 2021.

Following a season in the second tier, Denezhkin regained his scoring touch and returned to the KHL on 25 May 2022, after securing a two-year contract with Avtomobilist Yekaterinburg.

== Career statistics ==
=== Regular season and playoffs ===
			Regular season					Playoffs
Season	Team	League	GP	G	A	Pts	PIM	GP	G	A	Pts	PIM
2016–17	Loko-Junior Yaroslavl	NMHL	19	4	8	12	18	7	3	2	5	10
2017–18	Loko Yaroslavl	MHL	41	4	11	15	20	—	—	—	—	—
2017–18	Loko-Junior Yaroslavl	NMHL	12	3	4	7	34	10	1	2	3	4
2018–19	Loko Yaroslavl	MHL	51	22	17	39	22	12	1	6	7	8
2018–19	Loko-Junior Yaroslavl	NMHL	3	0	1	1	4	—	—	—	—	—
2018–19	Lokomotiv Yaroslavl	KHL	1	0	0	0	0	—	—	—	—	—
2019–20	Loko Yaroslavl	MHL	52	19	25	44	36	3	2	3	5	2
2019–20	Lokomotiv Yaroslavl	KHL	1	0	0	0	2	—	—	—	—	—
2019–20	Buran Voronezh	VHL	2	0	1	1	0	—	—	—	—	—
2020–21	Loko Yaroslavl	MHL	18	2	7	9	6	16	2	7	9	41
2020–21	Buran Voronezh	VHL	34	7	15	22	16	—	—	—	—	—
2020–21	Lokomotiv Yaroslavl	KHL	1	0	0	0	0	—	—	—	—	—
2021–22	HC Lada Togliatti	VHL	48	15	21	36	37	4	0	1	1	0
2022–23	Avtomobilist Yekaterinburg	KHL	2	0	0	0	0	—	—	—	—	—
2022–23	Gornyak-UGMK	VHL	37	8	13	21	90	12	1	2	3	6
2023–24	Avtomobilist Yekaterinburg	KHL	16	1	3	4	6	4	2	1	3	0
2023–24	Gornyak-UGMK	VHL	10	4	2	6	6	—	—	—	—	—
2024–25	Avtomobilist Yekaterinburg	KHL	57	9	7	16	18	5	0	2	2	2
2025–26	Avtomobilist Yekaterinburg	KHL	55	17	12	29	14	5	1	1	2	4
KHL totals			133	27	22	49	40	14	3	4	7	6

=== International ===
Year	Team	Event	Result	GP	G	A	Pts	PIM
2016	Russia	U17	3rd place, bronze medalist(s)	6	0	3	3	2
Junior totals				6	0	3	3	2

== Awards and honours ==
Award	Year
MHL
Kharlamov Cup (Loko Yaroslavl)	2018, 2019
