= Rasmus Kupari =

Finnish ice hockey player (born 2000)

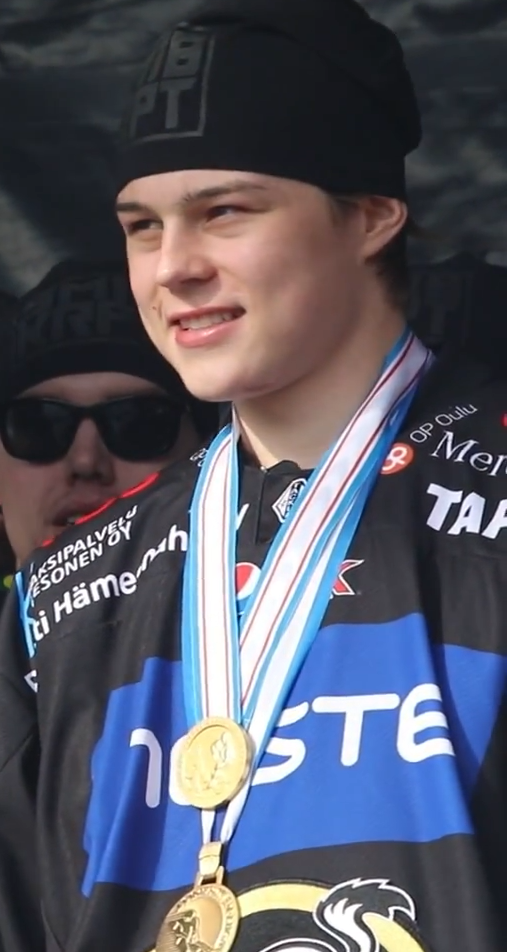
- Kupari with Oulun Kärpät in 2018
- Born: 15 March 2000 (age 26) Kotka, Finland
- Height: 6 ft 1 in (185 cm)
- Weight: 201 lb (91 kg; 14 st 5 lb)
- Position: Centre
- Shoots: Right
- NL team Former teams: HC Lugano; Oulun Kärpät; Los Angeles Kings; Winnipeg Jets
- NHL draft: 20th overall, 2018; Los Angeles Kings
- Playing career: 2017–present

Rasmus Kupari (born 15 March 2000) is a Finnish professional ice hockey forward for HC Lugano of Switzerland's National League. He was selected 20th overall by the Los Angeles Kings in the 2018 NHL entry draft.

== Playing career ==
Kupari made his professional and Liiga debut with Kärpät in the 2017–18 season on 14 September 2017. He scored his first goal on 28 September 2017. Kupari completed his first professional season as an 18-year-old with six goals and 14 points in 39 games.

On 22 June 2018, Kupari was selected in the first round, 20th overall, by the Los Angeles Kings in the 2018 NHL entry draft. He was later signed to a three-year, entry-level contract with the Kings on 13 July.

On 27 June 2023, Kupari was traded with Gabriel Vilardi, Alex Iafallo, and a 2024 second-round draft pick to the Winnipeg Jets for Pierre-Luc Dubois. As a restricted free agent, Kupari agreed to terms with the Jets in signing a two-year, $2 million contract extension on 2 August.

On 3 June 2025, Kupari signed a two-year contract with HC Lugano of Switzerland's National League.

== Career statistics ==
=== Regular season and playoffs ===
			Regular season					Playoffs
Season	Team	League	GP	G	A	Pts	PIM	GP	G	A	Pts	PIM
2016–17	Oulun Kärpät	Jr. A	22	4	10	14	6	5	2	3	5	2
2017–18	Oulun Kärpät	Jr. A	11	3	4	7	12	3	0	2	2	0
2017–18	Oulun Kärpät	Liiga	39	6	8	14	12	6	0	0	0	4
2017–18	Hermes	Mestis	5	1	3	4	4	—	—	—	—	—
2018–19	Oulun Kärpät	Liiga	43	12	21	33	65	16	1	4	5	6
2019–20	Ontario Reign	AHL	27	6	2	8	9	—	—	—	—	—
2020–21	Ontario Reign	AHL	32	8	15	23	18	1	0	0	0	4
2020–21	Los Angeles Kings	NHL	7	1	0	1	2	—	—	—	—	—
2021–22	Los Angeles Kings	NHL	57	5	8	13	18	5	0	0	0	2
2021–22	Ontario Reign	AHL	15	5	3	8	12	—	—	—	—	—
2022–23	Los Angeles Kings	NHL	66	3	12	15	12	6	0	0	0	0
2022–23	Ontario Reign	AHL	11	5	4	9	22	—	—	—	—	—
2023–24	Winnipeg Jets	NHL	28	0	1	1	4	—	—	—	—	—
2023–24	Manitoba Moose	AHL	1	0	0	0	0	—	—	—	—	—
2024–25	Winnipeg Jets	NHL	59	5	3	8	16	—	—	—	—	—
Liiga totals			82	18	29	47	77	22	1	4	5	10
NHL totals			217	14	24	38	52	11	0	0	0	2

Medal record

Representing Finland

Ice hockey

World Junior Championships
Gold medal – first place	2019 Canada	

IIHF World U18 Championship
Gold medal – first place	2018 Russia	
Silver medal – second place	2017 Slovakia	

=== International ===
Year	Team	Event	Result	GP	G	A	Pts	PIM
2016	Finland	U17	7th	5	0	1	1	0
2017	Finland	U18	2nd place, silver medalist(s)	7	0	3	3	2
2017	Finland	IH18	6th	4	2	5	7	0
2018	Finland	U18	1st place, gold medalist(s)	4	2	1	3	0
2018	Finland	WJC	6th	5	0	0	0	0
2019	Finland	WJC	1st place, gold medalist(s)	7	1	4	5	4
2020	Finland	WJC	4th	1	0	0	0	2
Junior totals				33	5	14	19	8

Awards and achievements
Preceded by Gabriel Vilardi	Los Angeles Kings first-round draft pick 2018	Succeeded by Alex Turcotte
