= Grigori Denisenko =

Russian ice hockey player (born 2000)

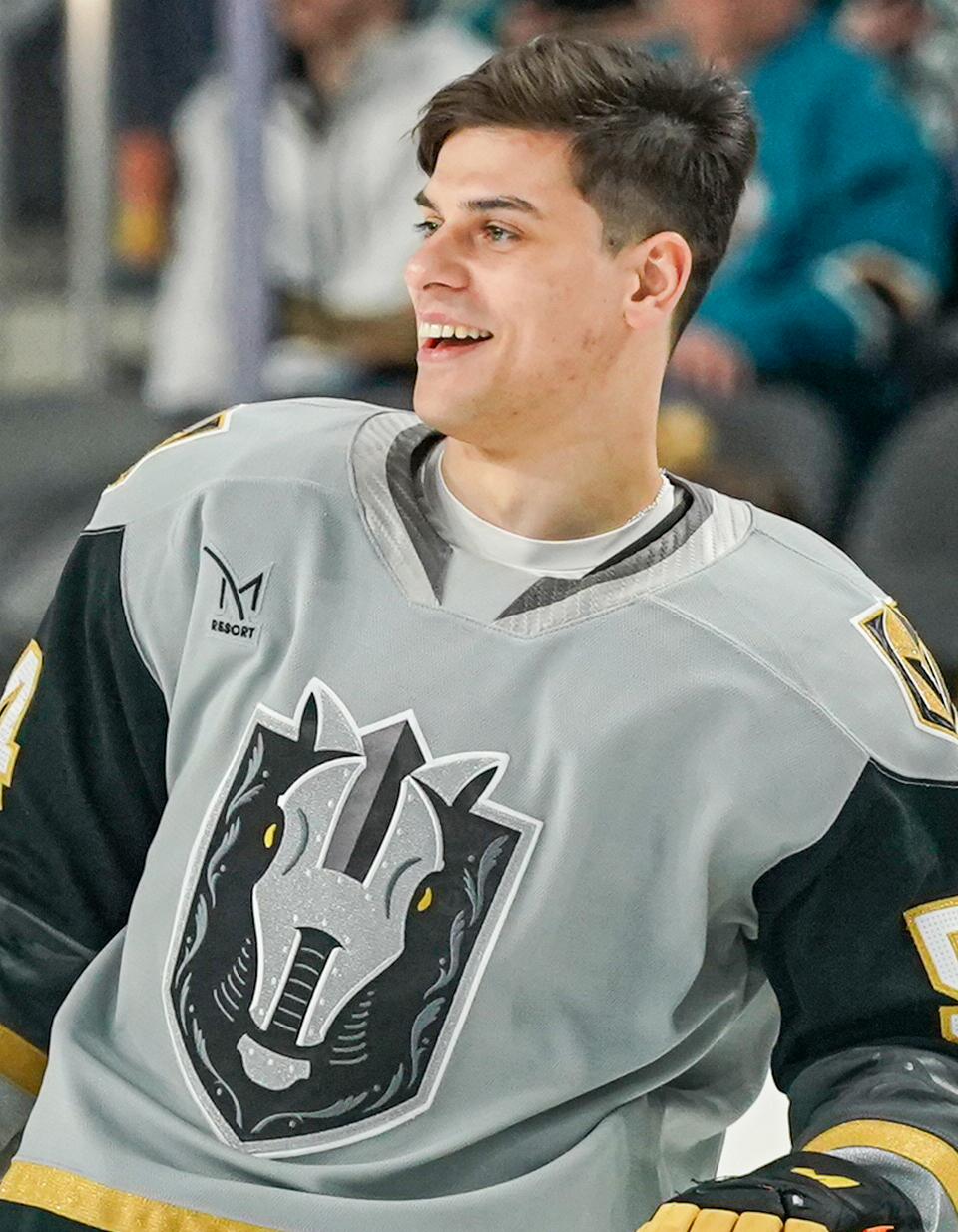
- Denisenko with the Henderson Silver Knights in 2024
- Born: 24 June 2000 (age 26) Novosibirsk, Russia
- Height: 5 ft 11 in (180 cm)
- Weight: 198 lb (90 kg; 14 st 2 lb)
- Position: Winger
- Shoots: Right
- KHL team Former teams: Ak Bars Kazan; Lokomotiv Yaroslavl; Florida Panthers; Vegas Golden Knights
- NHL draft: 15th overall, 2018; Florida Panthers
- Playing career: 2018–present

Grigori Georgievich Denisenko (Russian: Григорий Георгиевич Денисенко; born 24 June 2000) is a Russian professional ice hockey player who is a winger for Ak Bars Kazan of the Kontinental Hockey League (KHL). He was selected in the first round, 15th overall, by the Florida Panthers in the 2018 NHL entry draft. He played two seasons with Lokomotiv Yaroslavl of the KHL before moving to North America in 2020, and made his National Hockey League (NHL) debut in 2021.

== Playing career ==
Denisenko played as a youth within the junior ranks of Lokomotiv Yaroslavl. He made his professional debut in the Kontinental Hockey League with Lokomotiv during the 2017–18 playoffs, featuring in 4 post-season games before returning to help junior affiliate Loko capture the Junior Hockey Championship.

As the 7th ranked international skater by the NHL Central Scouting, Denisenko was selected at the 2018 NHL entry draft in the first round, 15th overall, by the Florida Panthers on 23 June 2018.

On 5 May 2020, Denisenko agreed to terms on a three-year, entry-level contract with the Florida Panthers. He officially signed his contract on 15 July 2020. He began the 2020–21 season playing in the American Hockey League with the Syracuse Crunch, and made his NHL debut on 6 March 2021 against the Nashville Predators. Denisenko later made his NHL playoff debut on 13 June 2023, filling in for an injured Matthew Tkachuk in game 5 of the 2023 Stanley Cup Final against the Vegas Golden Knights.

On 6 October 2023, Denisenko was waived by the Panthers and subsequently claimed by the Golden Knights. After being placed back on waivers by Vegas one day later, Denisenko was assigned to Vegas' AHL affiliate, the Henderson Silver Knights. Denisenko debuted for Vegas on 4 January 2024, playing eight minutes in a 4–1 loss to the Panthers. He completed his first season with Vegas, going scoreless through 6 games.

In the 2024–25 season, Denisenko made just one appearance with the Golden Knights, as he was primarily assigned to AHL affiliate, the Henderson Silver Knights. After posting 10 goals and 24 points through 42 games with the Silver Knights, Denisenko was traded by Vegas to the Nashville Predators in exchange for future considerations on 18 February 2025.

On 2 September 2025, Denisenko signed a one-year deal with Ak Bars Kazan of the Kontinental Hockey League (KHL).

== International play ==
Medal record

Men's ice hockey

Representing Russia

World Junior Championships
Silver medal – second place	2020 Czech Republic	
Bronze medal – third place	2019 Canada	

Denisenko was selected to the Russian team for the 2019 World Junior Championships in Vancouver, Canada. Denisenko was the tournament scoring leader, recording four goals and nine points in seven games to help Russia claim the Bronze medal.

== Career statistics ==
=== Regular season and playoffs ===
			Regular season					Playoffs
Season	Team	League	GP	G	A	Pts	PIM	GP	G	A	Pts	PIM
2016–17	Loko Yaroslavl	MHL	28	9	13	22	59	4	0	0	0	0
2017–18	Loko Yaroslavl	MHL	31	9	13	22	30	12	5	2	7	8
2017–18	Lokomotiv Yaroslavl	KHL	—	—	—	—	—	4	0	0	0	6
2018–19	Lokomotiv Yaroslavl	KHL	25	4	2	6	58	6	0	3	3	2
2018–19	Lada Togliatti	VHL	6	1	2	3	4	—	—	—	—	—
2018–19	Loko Yaroslavl	MHL	4	1	2	3	0	2	1	1	2	0
2019–20	Lokomotiv Yaroslavl	KHL	38	6	6	12	8	6	1	0	1	0
2020–21	Syracuse Crunch	AHL	15	5	4	9	2	—	—	—	—	—
2020–21	Florida Panthers	NHL	7	0	4	4	2	—	—	—	—	—
2021–22	Charlotte Checkers	AHL	30	9	9	18	8	—	—	—	—	—
2021–22	Florida Panthers	NHL	1	0	0	0	2	—	—	—	—	—
2022–23	Charlotte Checkers	AHL	56	12	24	36	39	4	0	0	0	6
2022–23	Florida Panthers	NHL	18	0	3	3	4	1	0	0	0	0
2023–24	Henderson Silver Knights	AHL	65	20	36	56	50	—	—	—	—	—
2023–24	Vegas Golden Knights	NHL	6	0	0	0	2	—	—	—	—	—
2024–25	Henderson Silver Knights	AHL	42	10	14	24	36	—	—	—	—	—
2024–25	Vegas Golden Knights	NHL	1	0	0	0	2	—	—	—	—	—
2024–25	Milwaukee Admirals	AHL	23	7	8	15	40	8	1	0	1	6
2025–26	Ak Bars Kazan	KHL	64	14	14	28	30	20	2	2	4	14
KHL totals			127	24	22	46	96	36	3	5	8	22
NHL totals			33	0	7	7	12	1	0	0	0	0

=== International ===
Year	Team	Event	Result	GP	G	A	Pts	PIM
2016	Russia	U17	3rd place, bronze medalist(s)	6	1	3	4	10
2017	Russia	IH18	4th	1	0	0	0	12
2019	Russia	WJC	3rd place, bronze medalist(s)	7	4	5	9	4
2020	Russia	WJC	2nd place, silver medalist(s)	7	3	6	9	8
Junior totals				21	8	14	22	34

== Awards and honours ==
Award	Year	Ref
International
World Junior Championship – Media All-Star Team	2019	

Awards and achievements
Preceded by Owen Tippett	Florida Panthers first-round draft pick 2018	Succeeded by Spencer Knight
