= Amir Miftakhov =

Russian ice hockey player (born 2000)

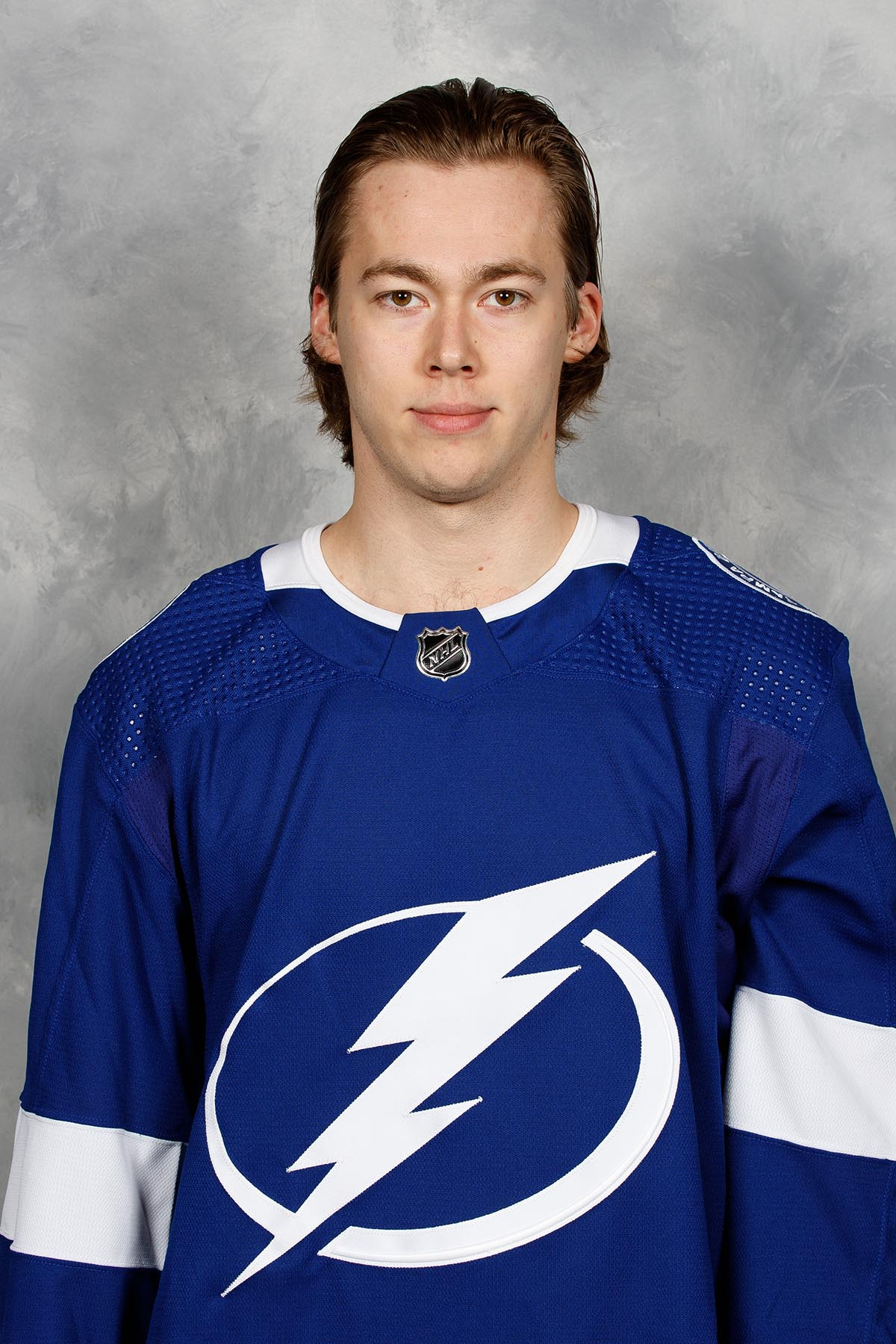
- Miftakhov with Tampa Bay Lightning in 2021
- Born: 26 April 2000 (age 26) Kazan, Russia
- Height: 6 ft 1 in (185 cm)
- Weight: 181 lb (82 kg; 12 st 13 lb)
- Position: Goaltender
- Catches: Left
- KHL team Former teams: Shanghai Dragons; Ak Bars Kazan
- NHL draft: 186th overall, 2020; Tampa Bay Lightning
- Playing career: 2019–present

Amir Rustemovich Miftakhov (Russian: Амир Рустемович Мифтахов; born 26 April 2000) is a Russian professional ice hockey goaltender who is currently under contract with the Shanghai Dragons of the Kontinental Hockey League (KHL). He was selected by the Tampa Bay Lightning in the sixth round, 186th overall, of the 2020 NHL entry draft.

== Playing career ==
Miftakhov progressed through the youth ranks of Ak Bars Kazan, one of the most prominent hockey organizations in Russia. He made his professional debut with Ak Bars Kazan in the Kontinental Hockey League (KHL).

On 3 May 2021, Miftakhov signed a three-year entry-level contract with the Tampa Bay Lightning, the team that had drafted him, with the deal set to start in the 2021–22 season. Miftakhov made his North American debut on October 27, playing for the Syracuse Crunch of the American Hockey League (AHL), where he stopped 29 of 31 shots in a 3–2 overtime victory against the Hershey Bears and picked up an assist on the winning goal. Just three games later, he earned his first North American shutout with a 4–0 win over the Laval Rocket. However, after struggling to establish himself within the Lightning organization during his only season in North America, Miftakhov was placed on unconditional waivers and, after clearing them on 2 July 2022, his contract was mutually terminated.

Miftakhov spent three seasons back with his hometown team, Ak Bars Kazan of the KHL, before making another bid for the NHL by signing a one-year, two-way deal with the Carolina Hurricanes for the 2025–26 season on 1 July 2025. On 28 September, Miftakhov was reassigned by the Hurricanes to the Chicago Wolves of the AHL. Miftakhov was recalled on 13 June 2026, by the Hurricanes as a backup option for game 5 of the 2026 Stanley Cup Final against the Vegas Golden Knights.

As a free agent from the Hurricanes, Miftakhov's KHL rights were traded by Ak Bars Kazan to the Shanghai Dragons on 5 August 2026. He then immediately signed a two-year contract with the team.
