= Olivier Rodrigue =

Canadian ice hockey player

- Born: July 6, 2000 (age 26) Chicoutimi, Quebec, Canada
- Height: 6 ft 1 in (185 cm)
- Weight: 158 lb (72 kg; 11 st 4 lb)
- Position: Goaltender
- Catches: Left
- NHL team (P) Cur. team Former teams: Tampa Bay Lightning; Syracuse Crunch (AHL); Graz99ers; Edmonton Oilers
- NHL draft: 62nd overall, 2018; Edmonton Oilers
- Playing career: 2024–present

Olivier Rodrigue (born July 6, 2000) is a Canadian professional ice hockey player who is a goaltender for the Syracuse Crunch of the American Hockey League (AHL) while under contract to the Tampa Bay Lightning of the National Hockey League (NHL). He has previously played in the National Hockey League (NHL) with the Edmonton Oilers.

== Playing career ==
Rodrigue was drafted sixty-second overall by the Oilers in the 2018 NHL entry draft. The Oilers traded up to draft him.

During the 2024–25 season, he made his NHL debut with the Oilers on March 27, 2025, in relief of Calvin Pickard in a 6–1 loss to the Seattle Kraken, allowing 1 goal on 8 shots.

As an impending restricted free agent, Rodrigue was not tendered a qualifying offer by the Oilers and was released as a free agent. On August 14, 2025, Rodrigue signed his first contract abroad in agreeing to a one-year deal with Barys Astana of the Kontinental Hockey League (KHL), for the 2025–26 season. However, in September 2025, Rodrigue suffered an injury in training, followed by a mutual termination of his contract before he played a game with the team.

In returning to fitness, Rodrigue was belatedly signed for the remainder of the 2025–26 season, on a two-way contract with the Chicago Blackhawks on February 21, 2026.

As a free agent at the conclusion of his brief contract with the Blackhawks, Rodrigue left to sign a one-year, two-way contract with the Tampa Bay Lightning for the 2026–27 season on July 1, 2026.

== Career statistics ==
=== Regular season and playoffs ===
Bold indicates led league

			Regular season									Playoffs
Season	Team	League	GP	W	L	OTL	MIN	GA	SO	GAA	SV%	GP	W	L	MIN	GA	SO	GAA	SV%
2016–17	Drummondville Voltigeurs	QMJHL	41	14	20	5	2,332	140	1	3.60	.878	2	0	2	65	5	0	4.58	.848
2017–18	Drummondville Voltigeurs	QMJHL	53	31	16	3	3,001	127	3	2.54	.903	10	5	5	648	27	0	2.50	.891
2018–19	Drummondville Voltigeurs	QMJHL	48	**35**	9	3	2,796	113	3	2.43	.902	3	0	1	106	4	0	2.27	.905
2019–20	Moncton Wildcats	QMJHL	39	31	7	1	2,353	91	**6**	2.32	.918	—	—	—	—	—	—	—	—
2020–21	Graz 99ers	ICEHL	23	10	10	0	1,313	68	0	3.11	.908	—	—	—	—	—	—	—	—
2020–21	Bakersfield Condors	AHL	11	4	5	0	562	28	1	2.99	.894	1	0	0	37	1	0	1.60	.929
2021–22	Bakersfield Condors	AHL	13	6	5	2	738	38	0	3.09	.886	—	—	—	—	—	—	—	—
2021–22	Wichita Thunder	ECHL	15	7	7	1	808	48	0	3.57	.907	—	—	—	—	—	—	—	—
2022–23	Bakersfield Condors	AHL	29	14	14	1	1,665	77	0	2.77	.912	—	—	—	—	—	—	—	—
2023–24	Bakersfield Condors	AHL	37	19	12	5	2,178	99	0	2.73	.916	1	0	1	58	2	0	2.07	.939
2024–25	Bakersfield Condors	AHL	41	18	16	7	2,404	125	1	3.12	.897	—	—	—	—	—	—	—	—
2024–25	Edmonton Oilers	NHL	2	0	1	0	77	4	0	3.10	.862	—	—	—	—	—	—	—	—
2025–26	Rockford IceHogs	AHL	10	4	3	1	507	27	1	3.20	.891	—	—	—	—	—	—	—	—
NHL totals			2	0	1	0	77	4	0	3.10	.862	—	—	—	—	—	—	—	—
