= Jonathan Gruden =

American ice hockey player (born 2000)

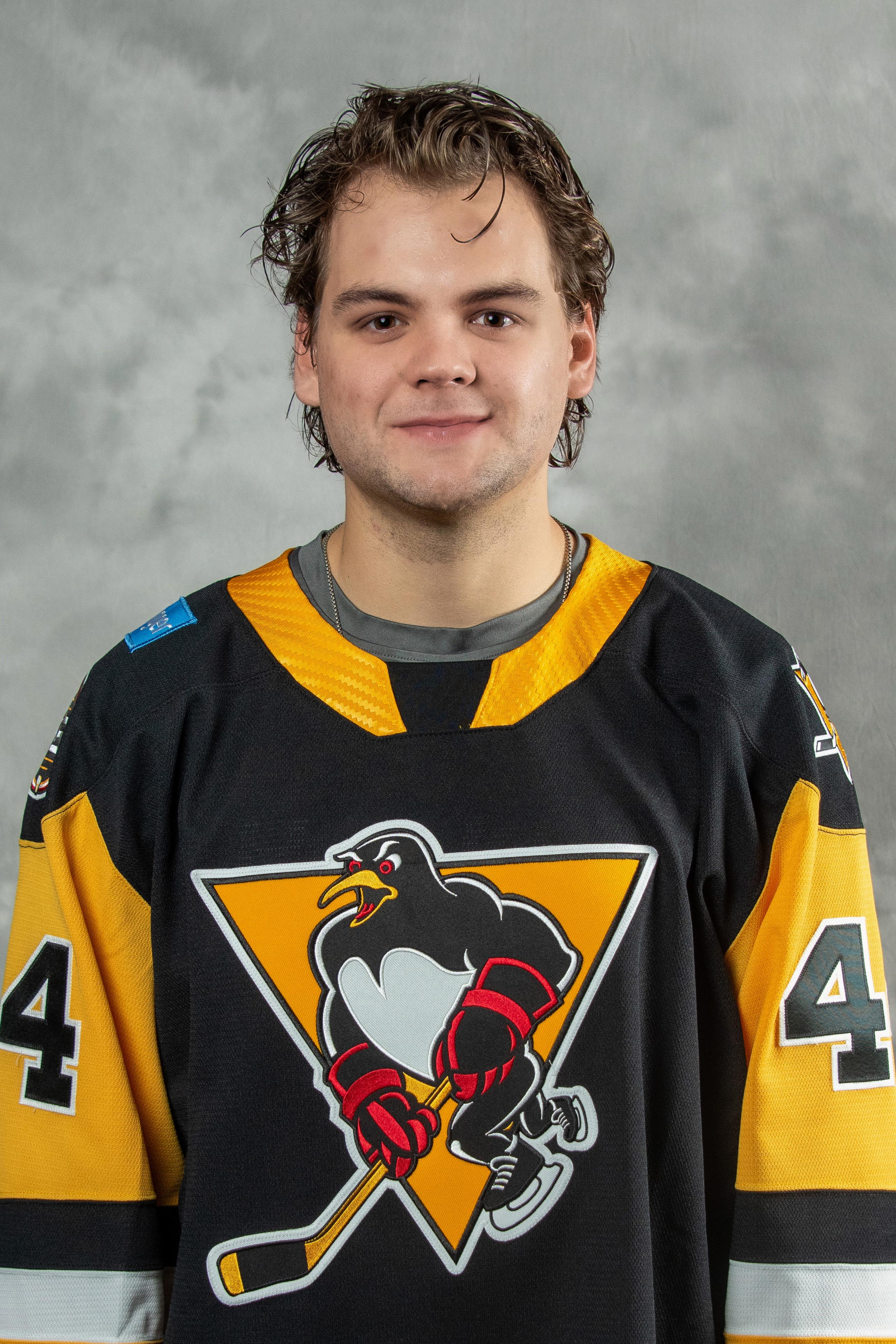
- Gruden in 2023
- Born: May 4, 2000 (age 26) Rochester Hills, Michigan
- Height: 6 ft 0 in (183 cm)
- Weight: 172 lb (78 kg; 12 st 4 lb)
- Position: Forward
- Shoots: Left
- AHL team Former teams: Lehigh Valley Phantoms; Pittsburgh Penguins
- NHL draft: 95th overall, 2018; Ottawa Senators
- Playing career: 2020–present

Jonathan Gruden (born May 4, 2000) is an American professional ice hockey forward for the Lehigh Valley Phantoms of the American Hockey League (AHL). He was selected by the Ottawa Senators in the fourth round, 95th overall, of the 2018 NHL entry draft. He previously played for the Pittsburgh Penguins of the National Hockey League (NHL).

== Playing career ==
=== Amateur ===
Gruden played as a youth in the Michigan area with the Honeybaked under-16 program before he was selected to the USA Hockey National Team Development Program at the under-17 and 18 level, featuring in the United States Hockey League (USHL). In his first season in 2016–17, he scored six goals and seven assists for 13 points in 34 games. In his under-18 year in 2017–18, he scored 15 goals and 34 points in 25 games. Committing to a collegiate career with Miami University, Gruden as a freshman in the 2018–19 season, collected just three goals and 15 points through 38 games. After just one season with the Miami RedHawks, preferred to continue his junior development in the major junior Ontario Hockey League (OHL), signed a contract with the London Knights, having been previously selected by the club in the 2016 OHL Priority Draft, 100th overall. In joining the Knights for the 2019–20 season, Gruden was amongst the team's top scorers, finishing with 30 goals and 66 points through only 59 games before the season was cancelled on March 12, 2020, due to the COVID-19 pandemic.

=== Professional ===
In his first year of eligibility, Gruden was selected by the Ottawa Senators of the National Hockey League (NHL) in the fourth round, 95th overall, of the 2018 NHL entry draft. Gruden signed a three-year, entry-level contract with the Senators on April 3, 2019.

Prior to the pandemic-shortened 2020–21 season, Gruden was traded by the Senators, along with a 2020 second-round pick to the Pittsburgh Penguins in exchange for two-time Stanley Cup winning goaltender Matt Murray on October 8, 2020. Gruden was assigned to the Penguins' American Hockey League (AHL) affiliate, the Wilkes-Barre/Scranton Penguins to begin the 2020–21 season, and recorded six goals and 14 points in 32 games. He spent the following 2021–22 season in the AHL as well, tallying ten goals and 27 points in 75 games. The AHL Penguins qualified for the playoffs and advanced to the second round were they were knocked off by the Springfield Falcons in three games in their best-of-five series. Gruden recorded one goal and three points in five-game playoff run. Gruden was assigned to Wilkes-Barre/Scranton to begin the 2022–23 season. He was recalled by Pittsburgh in January 2023 and made his NHL debut in a 4–3 win over the Anaheim Ducks. His second game was against the team which drafted him, the Ottawa Senators. He appeared in three games total for the Penguins, going scoreless, and was a healthy scratch for four more before being returned to Wilkes-Barre/Scranton on January 29. On July 17, 2023, Gruden signed a one-year extension with Pittsburgh. He finished the season with 16 goals and 31 points in 54 games with Wilkes-Barre/Scranton.

Gruden signed a one-year, two-way contract with Pittsburgh in July 2023. HE was invited to the 2023 Penguins training camp but failed to make the team. He was placed on waivers and after going unclaimed, assigned to Wilkes-Barre/Scranton. Gruden had a brief call-up (four hours) in November 2023 that did not result in any playing time, and was then returned to the AHL before being recalled on December 8 and making his season debut that night for Pittsburgh against the Florida Panthers. Gruden scored his first NHL goal on March 2, 2024, against Jacob Markström of the Calgary Flames. He was placed on waivers again on March 11, but went unclaimed. In 13 games with Pittsburgh, he recorded the one goal. He was assigned to the AHL on March 29, but was recalled later that day. He finished the AHL season with 13 goals and 24 points in 47 games. Wilkes-Barre/Scranton qualified for the playoffs and faced the Lehigh Valley Phantoms in their first round, best-of-three series. The Phantoms eliminated the AHL Penguins in two games, with Gruden going scoreless in the series. In the 2024 offseason he signed a two-year contract with the Penguins. He suffered an upper body injury in training camp and was placed on waivers ahead of the 2024–25 season. After going unclaimed, he was assigned to Wilkes-Barre/Scranton where he was named one of the team's alternate captains. In 42 games with Scranton/Wilkes-Barre, he produced seven goals and 13 points.

At the 2025 NHL trade deadline on March 7, 2025, Gruden was dealt by the Penguins alongside forward Cody Glass to the New Jersey Devils in exchange for forward Chase Stillman, the signing rights to prospect Max Graham and a third-round pick in 2027. He was assigned to the AHL affiliate, the Utica Comets. In 18 games with Utica he tallied one goal and five points. Gruden was among those invited to the Devils' 2025 training camp, but was waived and after going unclaimed, assigned to Utica to start the 2025–26 season. In 67 games with Utica, he tallied 12 goals and 26 points.

An unrestricted free agent in the 2026 offseason, he signed a one-year contract with the Lehigh Valley Phantoms on October 1, 2026.

== Personal ==
Gruden is the son of former NHL defenseman and current head coach of the Toronto Marlies, John Gruden.

== Career statistics ==
=== Regular season and playoffs ===
| | | | Regular season | | | | | Playoffs |
| Season | Team | League | GP | G | A | Pts | PIM | GP | G | A | Pts | PIM |
|---|---|---|---|---|---|---|---|---|---|---|---|---|
| 2016–17 | U.S. National Development Team | USHL | 34 | 6 | 7 | 13 | 20 | — | — | — | — | — |
| 2017–18 | U.S. National Development Team | USHL | 25 | 15 | 19 | 34 | 20 | — | — | — | — | — |
| 2018–19 | Miami University | NCHC | 38 | 3 | 12 | 15 | 12 | — | — | — | — | — |
| 2019–20 | London Knights | OHL | 59 | 30 | 36 | 66 | 23 | — | — | — | — | — |
| 2020–21 | Wilkes-Barre/Scranton Penguins | AHL | 32 | 6 | 8 | 14 | 13 | — | — | — | — | — |
| 2021–22 | Wilkes-Barre/Scranton Penguins | AHL | 75 | 10 | 17 | 27 | 78 | 5 | 1 | 2 | 3 | 6 |
| 2022–23 | Wilkes-Barre/Scranton Penguins | AHL | 54 | 16 | 15 | 31 | 54 | — | — | — | — | — |
| 2022–23 | Pittsburgh Penguins | NHL | 3 | 0 | 0 | 0 | 0 | — | — | — | — | — |
| 2023–24 | Wilkes-Barre/Scranton Penguins | AHL | 47 | 13 | 11 | 24 | 43 | 2 | 0 | 0 | 0 | 2 |
| 2023–24 | Pittsburgh Penguins | NHL | 13 | 1 | 0 | 1 | 5 | — | — | — | — | — |
| 2024–25 | Wilkes-Barre/Scranton Penguins | AHL | 42 | 7 | 6 | 13 | 48 | — | — | — | — | — |
| 2024–25 | Utica Comets | AHL | 18 | 1 | 4 | 5 | 18 | — | — | — | — | — |
| 2025–26 | Utica Comets | AHL | 67 | 12 | 14 | 26 | 59 | — | — | — | — | — |
| NHL totals | | | 16 | 1 | 0 | 1 | 5 | — | — | — | — | — |

=== International ===
| Year | Team | Event | Result | GP | G | A | Pts | PIM |
|---|---|---|---|---|---|---|---|---|
| 2016 | United States | U17 | 5th | 5 | 0 | 1 | 1 | 2 |
| 2018 | United States | U18 | 2nd place, silver medalist(s) | 7 | 0 | 4 | 4 | 4 |
| Junior totals | | | | 12 | 0 | 5 | 5 | 6 |

== Bibliography ==
- Chaimovitch, Jason, ed. (2025). 2025–2026 American Hockey League Official Guide & Record Book. Springfield, Massachusetts: American Hockey League. OCLC 22147888.
