= Egor Sokolov =

Russian ice hockey player (born 2000)

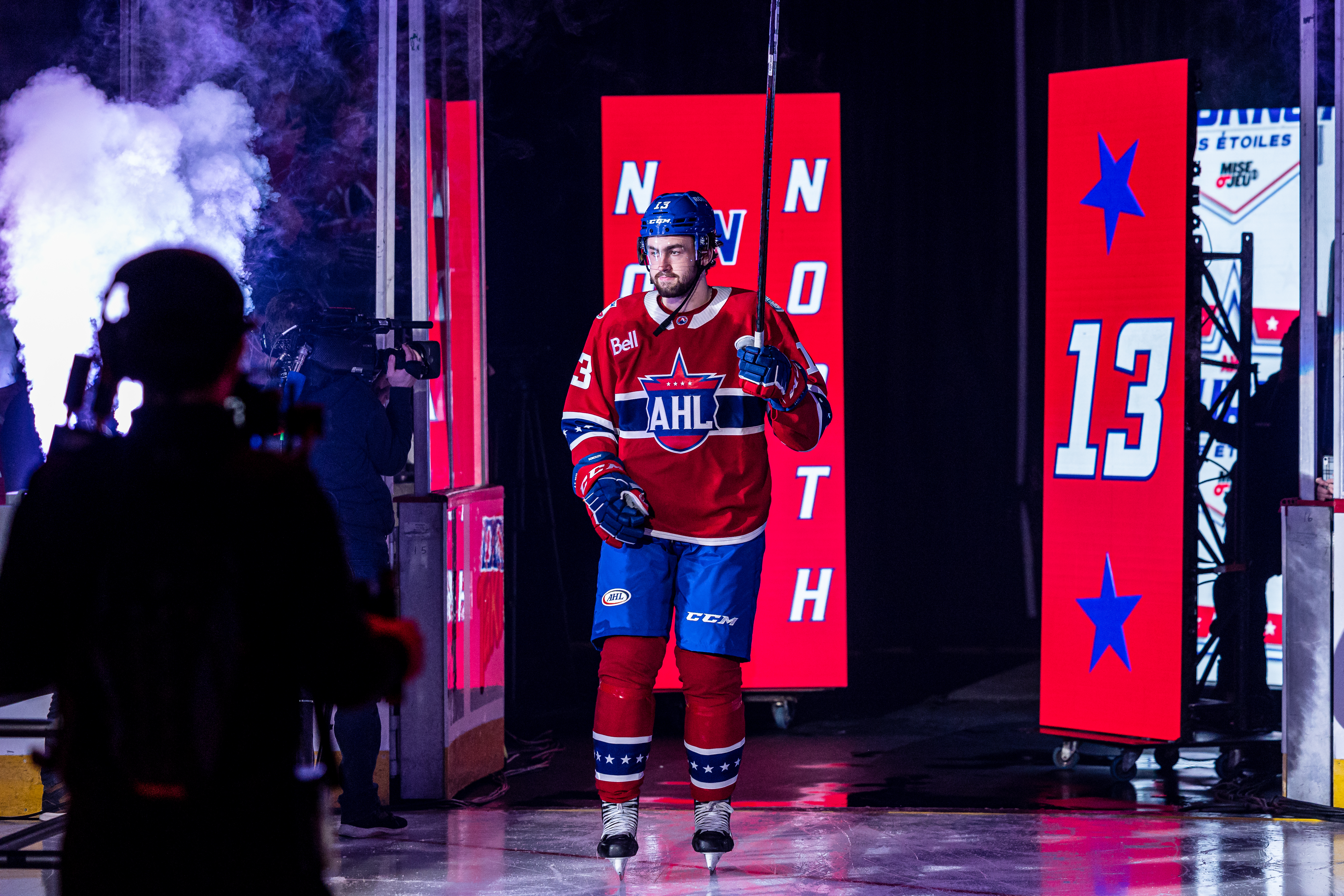
- Sokolov at the 2023 AHL All-Star Game.
- Born: June 7, 2000 (age 26) Yekaterinburg, Russia
- Height: 6 ft 3 in (191 cm)
- Weight: 222 lb (101 kg; 15 st 12 lb)
- Position: Left wing
- Shoots: Right
- KHL team Former teams: Ak Bars Kazan; Ottawa Senators; Torpedo Nizhny Novgorod
- NHL draft: 61st overall, 2020; Ottawa Senators
- Playing career: 2020–present

Egor Sokolov (born June 7, 2000) is a Russian professional ice hockey left winger for Ak Bars Kazan of the Kontinental Hockey League (KHL). He was selected by the Ottawa Senators in the second round, 61st overall, of the 2020 NHL entry draft.

== Playing career ==
Sokolov was selected in the Quebec Major Junior Hockey League (QMJHL) import draft by the Cape Breton Screaming Eagles with the 35th overall pick. After coming over to Canada from Russia for the 2017–18 season his teammate, Drake Batherson, helped get him accustomed to North American life. He played three seasons in the QMJHL with the Screaming Eagles, scoring 97 goals and 191 points in 184 games. In his final season he led the league in goals with 46 and came in third in league scoring with 92 points. He was named to the 2020 QMJHL First All-Star Team and the Screaming Eagles' most valuable player.

He was passed over in two National Hockey League (NHL) entry drafts before being selected by the Ottawa Senators in the second round, 61st overall in the 2020 NHL entry draft. Before his selection by the Senators, Sokolov had attended the development camps of the Columbus Blue Jackets and Toronto Maple Leafs. On November 20, 2020, the Senators signed Sokolov to a three-year entry-level contract. After attending his first training camp, Sokolov was assigned to Ottawa's American Hockey League (AHL) affiliate, the Belleville Senators. He was recalled by the Senators on November 8, 2021 and played in his first NHL game on November 9, 2021, against the Boston Bruins. He played the majority of the 2022–23 season with Belleville, scoring 21 goals and 59 points in 70 games. He represented Belleville at the 2023 AHL All-Star Classic. He was recalled late in the NHL season and played in five games with Ottawa. On April 8, 2023, Sokolov scored his first career NHL goal against the Tampa Bay Lightning in a 7-4 win for Ottawa. Sokolov re-signed with Ottawa on September 19, 2023, to a one-year, two-way contract. He failed to make Ottawa's team out of training camp and was placed on waivers. He went unclaimed and was assigned to Belleville to start the 2023–24 season. He spent the entire season in the AHL, playing in 71 games and scoring 21 goals and 46 points, good for second on the team.

After playing his fourth season with the Senators organization, Sokolov was traded to Utah Hockey Club in exchange for winger Jan Jeník on July 3, 2024. He signed a one-year, two-way contract with Utah on July 9. He was placed on waivers and after going unclaimed, was assigned to Utah's AHL affiliate, the Tucson Roadrunners, to start the 2024–25 season.

At the conclusion of his contract with Utah, Sokolov opted to return to his native Russia, signing a one-year contract with CSKA Moscow of the KHL, after the club acquired his rights from Avtomobilist Yekaterinburg on 1 July 2025. Before the commencement of the 2025–26 season, Sokolov was traded by CSKA to Torpedo Nizhny Novgorod in exchange for the rights to Nikolai Kovalenko on 3 July 2025.

After a lone season with Torpedo, Sokolov was traded at the beginning of the 2026–27 season initially to HC Dinamo Minsk in exchange for financial compensation. He was then immediately dealt by Minsk to Ak Bars Kazan in exchange for Vladimir Alistrov on 8 September 2026.

== International play ==
Medal record

Representing Russia

Ice hockey

World Junior Championships
Silver medal – second place	2020 Czech Republic	

Sokolov was selected to play for Russia at the 2020 World Junior Ice Hockey Championships. He scored three goals and an assist for four points in seven games as Russia won the silver medal.

== Career statistics ==
=== Regular season and playoffs ===
			Regular season					Playoffs
Season	Team	League	GP	G	A	Pts	PIM	GP	G	A	Pts	PIM
2016–17	Belye Medvedi Chelyabinsk	MHL	15	0	6	6	4	—	—	—	—	—
2017–18	Cape Breton Screaming Eagles	QMJHL	64	21	21	42	39	5	1	0	1	4
2018–19	Cape Breton Screaming Eagles	QMJHL	68	30	27	57	24	11	4	3	7	2
2019–20	Cape Breton Eagles	QMJHL	52	46	46	92	42	—	—	—	—	—
2020–21	Belleville Senators	AHL	35	15	10	25	14	—	—	—	—	—
2021–22	Belleville Senators	AHL	64	19	31	50	22	2	0	1	1	0
2021–22	Ottawa Senators	NHL	8	0	0	0	4	—	—	—	—	—
2022–23	Belleville Senators	AHL	70	21	38	59	72	—	—	—	—	—
2022–23	Ottawa Senators	NHL	5	1	1	2	0	—	—	—	—	—
2023–24	Belleville Senators	AHL	71	21	25	46	69	7	1	3	4	0
2024–25	Tucson Roadrunners	AHL	72	22	22	44	16	3	0	0	0	0
2025–26	Torpedo Nizhny Novgorod	KHL	65	15	25	40	22	5	0	0	0	2
NHL totals			13	1	1	2	4	—	—	—	—	—
KHL totals			65	15	25	40	22	5	0	0	0	2

=== International ===
Year	Team	Event	Result	GP	G	A	Pts	PIM
2016	Russia	U17	3rd place, bronze medalist(s)	6	2	1	3	2
2017	Russia	IH18	4th	5	1	3	4	4
2020	Russia	WJC	2nd place, silver medalist(s)	7	3	1	4	16
Junior totals				18	6	5	11	22

== Awards and honours ==
Award	Year
QMJHL
First All-Star Team	2020
AHL
Canadian Division All-Star Team	2021
2023 All-Star Classic	2023
