= Mathias Emilio Pettersen =

Norwegian ice hockey player

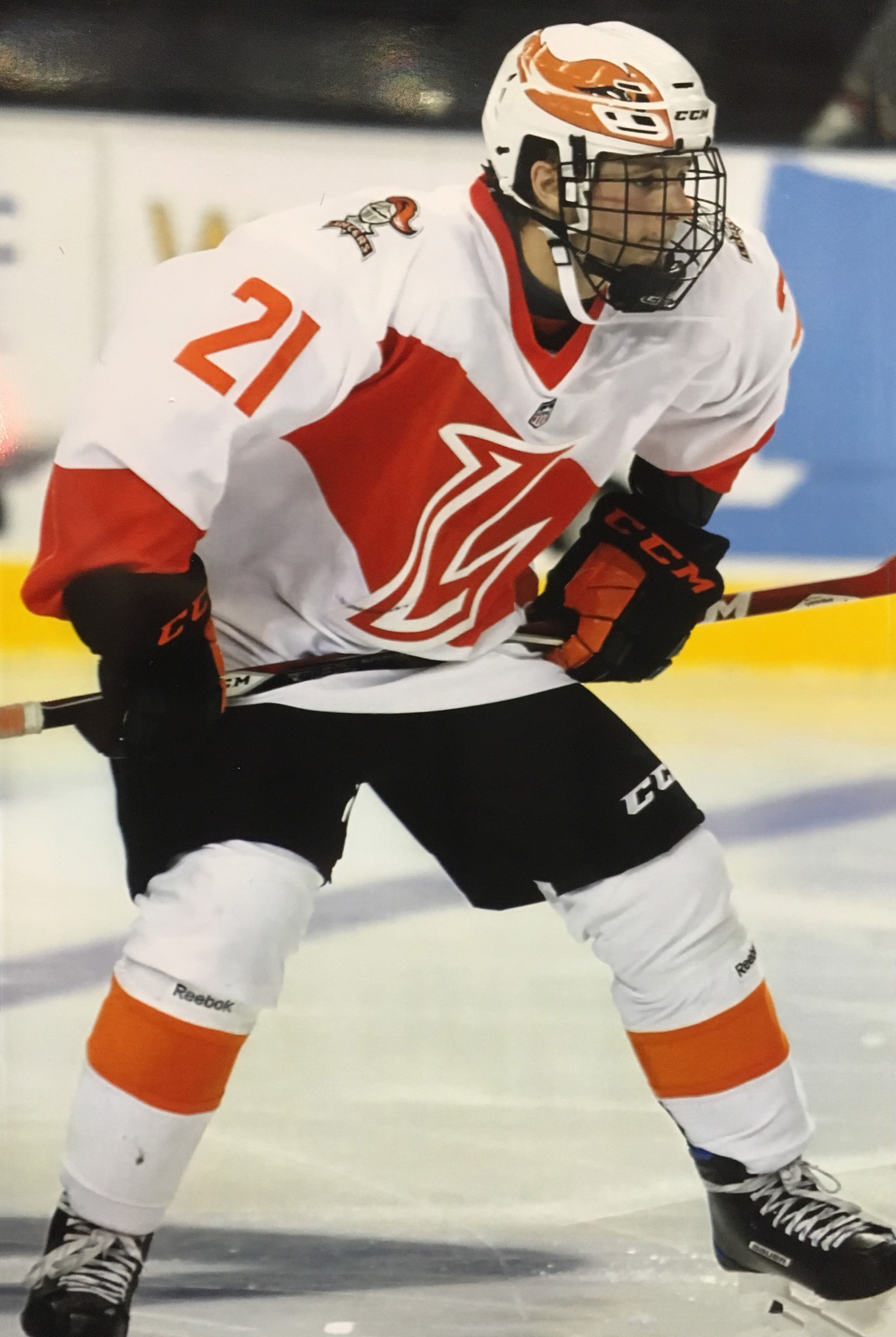
- Pettersen with the Omaha Lancers in 2016
- Born: 3 April 2000 (age 26) Manglerud, Norway
- Height: 5 ft 11 in (180 cm)
- Weight: 190 lb (86 kg; 13 st 8 lb)
- Position: Centre
- Shoots: Left
- SHL team: Djurgårdens IF
- National team: Norway
- NHL draft: 167th overall, 2018; Calgary Flames
- Playing career: 2021–present

Mathias Emilio Pettersen (born 3 April 2000) is a Norwegian professional ice hockey player who is a centre for Djurgårdens IF of the Swedish Hockey League (SHL). He was selected by the Calgary Flames in the 2018 NHL entry draft and previously played collegiate ice hockey with the University of Denver of the National Collegiate Hockey Conference (NCHC) and junior for the Omaha Lancers and Muskegon Lumberjacks of the United States Hockey League (USHL). Pettersen's early career was met with great expectations. Supporters and newspapers started covering his career when he was 6 years old.

== Playing career ==
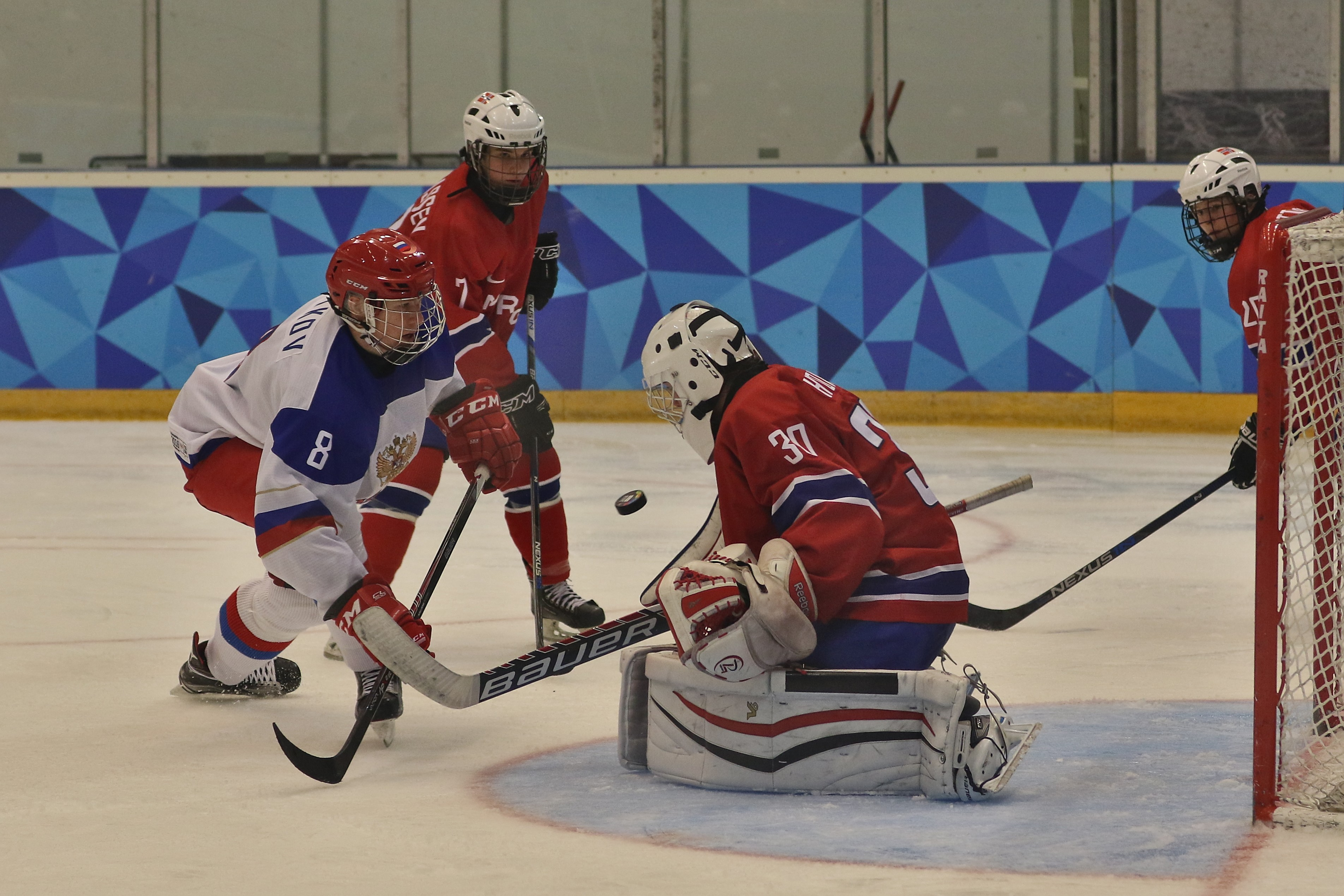
Pettersen (20) in action for Norway at the 2016 Winter Youth Olympics.

Pettersen first played minor hockey for Manglerud Star and Lørenskog IK, often at age levels several years older than his own. He was invited to move to Sweden at age 13 and join the youth program of Färjestad BK, but instead opted to move to the United States in 2013. He joined South Kent School of the United States Premier Hockey League in 2014. He spent two season with South Kent, scoring 41 points in 28 games the first season, and 65 points in 40 games the second.

He signed a tender with Omaha Lancers of the United States Hockey League on 4 January 2016. After one season with Omaha, where he recorded 27 points in 57 games, Pettersen was traded to the Muskegon Lumberjacks. He has committed to joining the University of Denver in 2018.

Following his sophomore season, Pettersen concluded his collegiate career by signing a three-year, entry-level contact with the Calgary Flames on 27 April 2020.

On 7 March 2024, Pettersen was traded to the Dallas Stars in exchange for Riley Damiani.

As a free agent at the conclusion of his contract with the Stars, Pettersen left North America and was signed to a two-year contract with Swedish club, Djurgårdens IF of the SHL, on 21 July 2025.

== International play ==
Medal record

Men's ice hockey

Representing Norway

World Championships
Bronze medal – third place	2026 Switzerland	

Pettersen's first International Ice Hockey Federation (IIHF) tournament was the 2016 IIHF World U18 Championship Division I. He appeared in 5 games for Norway and recorded five points. He returned for the 2017 IIHF World U18 Championship Division I, and led the tournament in scoring with 12 points in 5 games.

Pettersen made his senior debut with Norway at the 2021 World Championships. He played 6 games and scored one goal.

== Personal life ==
Pettersen's father, Flemming Pettersen, is a former ice hockey player who played in the Norwegian Eliteserien.

== Career statistics ==
=== Regular season and playoffs ===
			Regular season					Playoffs
Season	Team	League	GP	G	A	Pts	PIM	GP	G	A	Pts	PIM
2013–14	Lørenskog U16	Nor-U16	20	34	37	71	18	—	—	—	—	—
2014–15	Selects Hockey Academy	USPHL U16	28	18	23	41	8	3	1	3	4	4
2015–16	Selects Hockey Academy	USPHL U16	21	14	22	36	27	3	5	4	9	0
2015–16	Selects Hockey Academy	Midg	40	21	44	65	—	—	—	—	—	—
2016–17	Omaha Lancers	USHL	57	10	17	27	28	—	—	—	—	—
2017–18	Muskegon Lumberjacks	USHL	60	14	32	46	32	3	0	0	0	0
2018–19	University of Denver	NCHC	40	6	24	30	16	—	—	—	—	—
2019–20	University of Denver	NCHC	36	13	22	35	16	—	—	—	—	—
2020–21	Stockton Heat	AHL	29	6	8	14	6	—	—	—	—	—
2021–22	Stockton Heat	AHL	59	13	13	26	20	11	2	2	4	0
2022–23	Calgary Wranglers	AHL	61	19	25	44	35	5	0	1	1	2
2023–24	Calgary Wranglers	AHL	54	7	23	30	35	—	—	—	—	—
2023–24	Texas Stars	AHL	12	4	4	8	6	7	2	3	5	6
2024–25	Texas Stars	AHL	70	9	20	29	29	14	1	2	3	8
2025–26	Djurgårdens IF	SHL	48	4	17	21	47	3	0	0	0	6
AHL totals			285	58	93	151	131	37	5	8	13	16

=== International ===
Year	Team	Event	Result	GP	G	A	Pts	PIM
2016	Norway	U18-D1	DNQ	5	3	2	5	0
2017	Norway	U18-D1	DNQ	5	4	8	12	4
2019	Norway	WJC-D1	DNQ	4	3	3	6	2
2021	Norway	WC	13th	6	1	0	1	2
2024	Norway	WC	11th	3	0	0	0	4
2024	Norway	OGQ	DNQ	3	1	2	3	0
2026	Norway	WC	3rd place, bronze medalist(s)	10	1	4	5	4
Junior totals				14	10	13	23	6
Senior totals				22	3	6	9	10
