= Jake Wise =

American ice hockey player (born 2000)

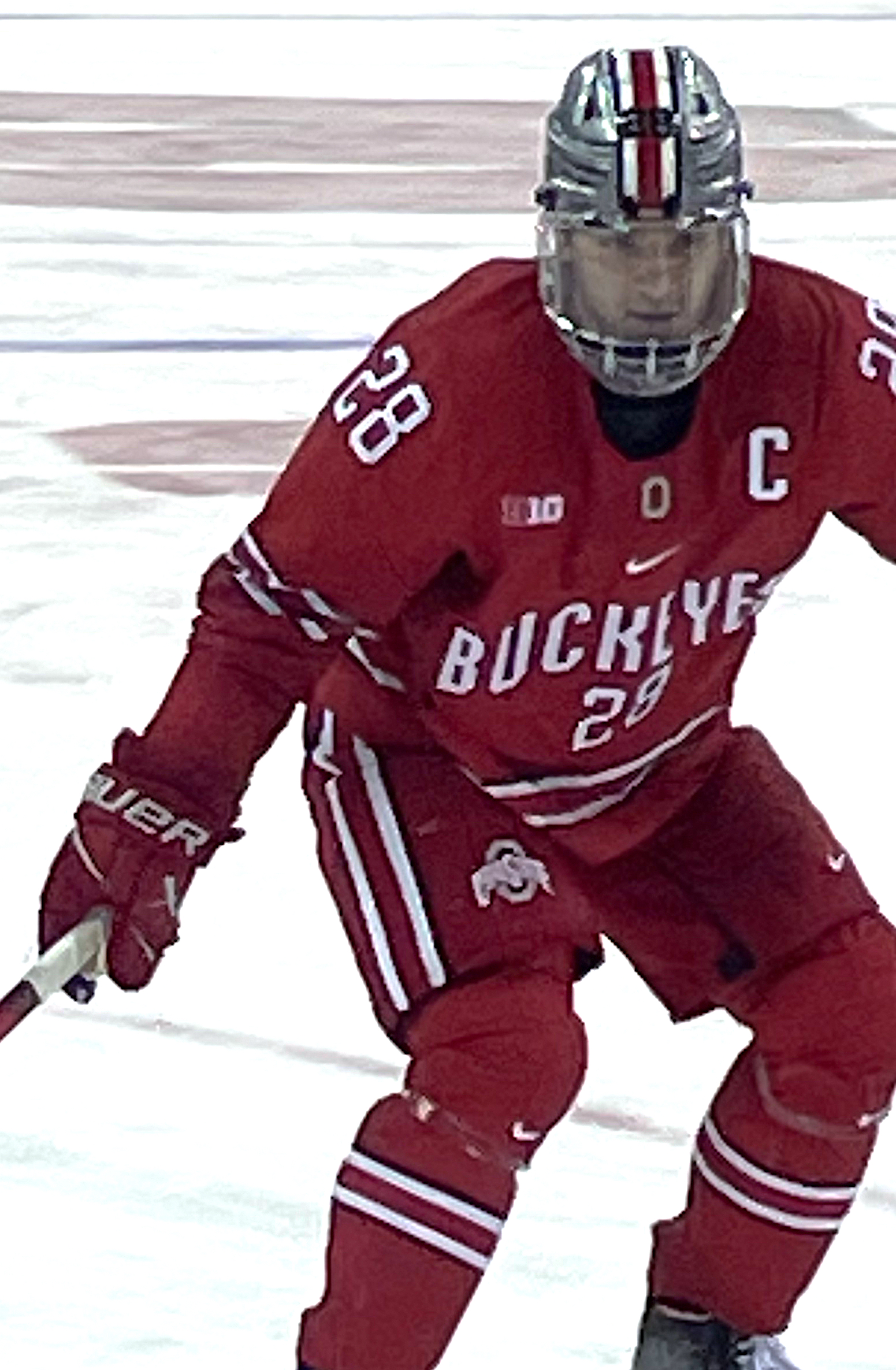
- Wise playing for the Ohio State Buckeyes in January 2023
- Born: February 28, 2000 (age 26) Naples, Florida, U.S
- Height: 5 ft 10 in (178 cm)
- Weight: 189 lb (86 kg; 13 st 7 lb)
- Position: Forward
- Shoots: Left
- AHL team Former teams: Colorado Eagles; Charlotte Checkers; Chicago Wolves
- NHL draft: 69th overall, 2018; Chicago Blackhawks
- Playing career: 2023–present

Jake Wise (born February 28, 2000) is an American professional ice hockey forward for the Colorado Eagles of the American Hockey League (AHL). He previously played college ice hockey for Ohio State University and Boston University of the National Collegiate Athletic Association (NCAA).

== Playing career ==
=== Collegiate ===
==== Boston University ====
Wise was drafted by the Chicago Blackhawks in the third round of the 2018 NHL entry draft.

Wise originally committed to play college ice hockey for the Boston University during the 2018–19 season. However, his time at Boston University was frustrating for him, as he never finished a full season for the team due to both injury and the COVID-19 pandemic.

==== Ohio State University ====
Wise transferred to Ohio State University beginning in the 2021–22 season. He immediately had more success at Ohio State, finishing third on the team in total points and tied for second in goals. Wise decided to return to Ohio State for the 2022–23 season, his final season of eligibility. Prior to the start of the season, he was named one of three captains of the team. He had another successful season, finishing second on the team in total points and third in assists. In Ohio State's dominating 8–1 win over Harvard University in the first round of the 2023 NCAA tournament, Wise had four assists. Ohio State would eventually lose the Quinnipiac University the following round.

=== Professional ===
After his college eligibility ran out, Wise signed a professional tryout contract (PTO) with the Charlotte Checkers of the American Hockey League. In his lone regular season game with the club, he scored two assists for his first professional points.

On August 17, 2023, the Checkers announced that they had signed Wise to a one-year AHL contract for the 2023–24 season. Wise made 38 regular season appearance with the Checkers, posting 7 goals and 20 points, before he was traded to the Chicago Wolves in exchange for Mitchell Vande Sompel on March 9, 2024. Wise would struggle with the Wolves, scoring a lone assist in 15 games. The team success wasn't much better, as they missed the playoffs.

As a free agent, Wise remained un-signed over the summer until he agreed to a PTO with the Ontario Reign of the AHL, affiliate to the Los Angeles Kings. He remained on the Reign's roster through pre-season and the beginning of the 2024–25 season, however did not make his debut with the club. On October 29, 2024, Wise left the Reign to sign a PTO with fellow AHL club, the Colorado Eagles. Instantly used in a scoring role with the Eagles, Wise added 5 points through is first 6 games to earn a one-year contract with Colorado on November 13, 2024. On April 12, Wise assisted on Colorado Avalanche captain Gabriel Landeskog first professional goal since 2022, while Landeskog was with the Eagles on a rehab stint for that kept him out for almost three years. Wise finished the season with 16 goals and 19 assists in 56 games. He would score two goals in eight playoffs games before the Eagles were eliminated by the Abbotsford Canucks in the semifinals of the Calder Cup playoffs.

In establishing career high offensive totals, Wise was re-signed by the Colorado Eagles to a one-year contract for the 2025–26 season on June 3, 2025.

Wise would struggle to replicate his offense from the previous season, managing only two goals and nine assists in 47 games with the Eagles. Wise was a frequent healthy scratch throughout the regular season, and would not appear in any games for the Eagles in the Calder Cup playoffs.

On September 19, 2026, Wise re-signed with the Eagles.

== Personal ==
Although born in Naples, Florida, Wise grew up in Reading, Massachusetts.

== Career statistics ==
=== Regular season and playoffs ===
| | | | Regular season | | | | | Playoffs |
| Season | Team | League | GP | G | A | Pts | PIM | GP | G | A | Pts | PIM |
|---|---|---|---|---|---|---|---|---|---|---|---|---|
| 2014–15 | Central Catholic High | USHS | 25 | 16 | 26 | 42 | 6 | — | — | — | — | — |
| 2015–16 | Central Catholic High | USHS | 21 | 16 | 25 | 41 | 4 | — | — | — | — | — |
| 2016–17 | U.S. National Development Team | USHL | 33 | 2 | 9 | 11 | 10 | — | — | — | — | — |
| 2017–18 | U.S. National Development Team | USHL | 18 | 9 | 19 | 28 | 4 | — | — | — | — | — |
| 2018–19 | Boston University | HE | 12 | 0 | 2 | 2 | 0 | — | — | — | — | — |
| 2019–20 | Boston University | HE | 33 | 2 | 11 | 13 | 12 | — | — | — | — | — |
| 2020–21 | Boston University | HE | 5 | 1 | 1 | 2 | 4 | — | — | — | — | — |
| 2021–22 | Ohio State Buckeyes | B1G | 35 | 10 | 18 | 28 | 2 | — | — | — | — | — |
| 2022–23 | Ohio State Buckeyes | B1G | 40 | 12 | 27 | 39 | 10 | — | — | — | — | — |
| 2022–23 | Charlotte Checkers | AHL | 1 | 0 | 2 | 2 | 0 | 1 | 1 | 0 | 1 | 0 |
| 2023–24 | Charlotte Checkers | AHL | 38 | 7 | 13 | 20 | 16 | — | — | — | — | — |
| 2023–24 | Chicago Wolves | AHL | 15 | 0 | 1 | 1 | 6 | — | — | — | — | — |
| 2024–25 | Colorado Eagles | AHL | 56 | 16 | 19 | 35 | 18 | 8 | 2 | 0 | 2 | 0 |
| 2025–26 | Colorado Eagles | AHL | 47 | 2 | 9 | 11 | 14 | — | — | — | — | — |
| AHL totals | | | 157 | 25 | 44 | 69 | 54 | 9 | 3 | 0 | 3 | 0 |

=== International ===
| Year | Team | Event | Result | GP | G | A | Pts | PIM |
|---|---|---|---|---|---|---|---|---|
| 2016 | United States | U17 | 5th | 5 | 2 | 2 | 4 | 10 |
| 2018 | United States | U18 | 2nd place, silver medalist(s) | 7 | 1 | 4 | 5 | 2 |
| Junior totals | | | | 12 | 3 | 6 | 9 | 12 |

== Awards and honors ==
| Award | Year | Ref. |
College
| All-Big Ten Second Team | 2023 | |
