= Anttoni Honka =

Finnish ice hockey player (born 2000)

- Born: 5 October 2000 (age 25) Jyväskylä, Finland
- Height: 5 ft 11 in (180 cm)
- Weight: 184 lb (83 kg; 13 st 2 lb)
- Position: Defence
- Shoots: Right
- NL team Former teams: HC Ajoie; JYP Jyväskylä; Jukurit
- NHL draft: 83rd overall, 2019; Carolina Hurricanes
- Playing career: 2017–present

Anttoni Honka (born 5 October 2000) is a Finnish professional ice hockey defenceman who currently plays with HC Ajoie in the Swiss National League (NL). Honka was selected by the Carolina Hurricanes in the 3rd round (83rd overall) of the 2019 NHL entry draft.

== Playing career ==
Honka was a "high risk, high reward" prospect who was ranked #22 on the NHL Central Scouting Bureau final list of 2019 NHL Draft eligible European skaters.

Honka played the 2017–18 season in the JYP Jyväskylä system. He played 28 games with JYP U20 in the Nuorten SM-liiga (Jr. A) and 20 games with JYP in the Liiga; he was also loaned to KeuPa HT, the farm club for JYP in the Mestis, for seven regular season games and five playoff games. His play in the 2017–18 season earned him the Reijo Ruotsalainen Award for Best Defenseman in Finnish U20 and selection to the Jr. A SM-liiga First All-Star Team.

The 2018–19 season saw Honka continue to move between the Liiga, Mestis, and Junior A SM-liiga. He began the season with the JYP organization, playing six games with JYP U20 and 16 games in the Liiga, before being loaned out for the remainder of the season to KeuPa in the Mestis and Mikkelin Jukurit in Liiga. In the post-season, Honka played with KeuPa in the Mestis playoffs, contributing big minutes and 11 points (3+8) in 17 games before the team ultimately fell to Imatran Ketterä in the finals.

Following his sixth season in the Liiga, Honka was signed to a three-year, entry-level contract with his draft club, the Carolina Hurricanes, on 17 August 2022. After spending the 2024 NHL preseason with the Hurricanes, Honka was loaned to HC Ajoie the National League of Switzerland.

On 10 December 2024, Ajoie announced that it had signed Honka to a two-year contract extension through the 2026–27 season.

== International play ==
Medal record

Representing Finland

Ice hockey

World Junior Championships
Gold medal – first place	2019 Canada	

World Junior U18 Championships
Gold medal – first place	2018 Russia	

Honka made his IIHF international debut for Finland in April 2018 at the 2018 IIHF World U18 Championships in Chelyabinsk and Magnitogorsk, Russia where he was able to play with other Finnish top talents including 2018 NHL entry draft third-overall selection Jesperi Kotkaniemi and fellow 2019 NHL Entry Draft selections Kaapo Kakko, Lassi Thomson, and Mikko Kokkonen. Honka collected five points in seven games to help the team secure gold over the United States.

He joined Team Finland again in December 2018 for the 2019 World Junior Ice Hockey Championships (2019 WJC) in Vancouver and Victoria, British Columbia. His first international tournament at the under-20 (junior) level saw Honka on a team of highly skilled players including NHL prospects Henri Jokiharju and Eeli Tolvanen and fellow 2019 NHL Entry Draft selections Kaapo Kakko, Ville Heinola, Kim Nousiainen, and Valtteri Puustinen. Honka saw limited ice time throughout the tournament and collected no points in six games played. Finland's efforts once again beat out the United States in the final round and resulted in gold.

Honka's first major tournament after being drafted was the 2020 World Junior Ice Hockey Championship, which was a substantially better showing for him than the previous year. The Finnish roster was strong, with ranks filled by returning players and a number of 2019 NHL draft selections, including Lassi Thomson, Mikko Kokkonen, goaltender Justus Annunen, and Honka's Carolina Hurricanes draft-mate Patrik Puistola, in addition to top-rated players eligible for future drafts, most notably, Aatu Räty. In contrast to the 2019 tournament, Honka saw substantial minutes, ranking third for defenceman time on ice and averaging 16:26 minutes per game. He notched an assist on Patrik Puistola's goal against Sweden, Finland's first goal of the tournament. Several days later, Honka scored a one timer against Switzerland off of an assist from Ville Heinola (secondary assist by Kristian Tanus) and was named Best Player of the Game as selected by the team. The Finns were competitive throughout but ultimately fell to Sweden in the bronze medal game, finishing the tournament in fourth place.

== Personal life ==
Honka comes from a family of hockey players; his father and three older brothers are or were hockey players. His eldest brother, Aleksi, retired with Kiekko-Espoo of the Suomi-sarja in 2020. His third-eldest brother, Julius, was selected by the Dallas Stars in the first round (14th overall) of the 2014 NHL entry draft and currently plays with SC Bern of the National League.

== Career statistics ==
=== Regular season and playoffs ===
			Regular season					Playoffs
Season	Team	League	GP	G	A	Pts	PIM	GP	G	A	Pts	PIM
2017–18	JYP	Jr. A	28	4	13	17	22	2	0	1	1	0
2017–18	JYP	Liiga	20	2	7	9	2	—	—	—	—	—
2017–18	KeuPa	Mestis	7	0	3	3	8	5	1	2	3	4
2018–19	JYP	Jr. A	6	2	7	9	2	—	—	—	—	—
2018–19	JYP	Liiga	16	1	3	4	6	—	—	—	—	—
2018–19	KeuPa	Mestis	11	2	5	7	10	17	3	8	11	6
2018–19	Jukurit	Liiga	11	2	2	4	6	—	—	—	—	—
2019–20	JYP	Liiga	43	3	16	19	8	—	—	—	—	—
2020–21	JYP	Liiga	58	4	27	31	16	—	—	—	—	—
2021–22	JYP	Liiga	57	6	31	37	22	—	—	—	—	—
2022–23	Chicago Wolves	AHL	70	6	28	34	22	—	—	—	—	—
2023–24	JYP	Liiga	48	2	21	23	12	—	—	—	—	—
2024–25	HC Ajoie	NL	42	8	13	21	16	—	—	—	—	—
Liiga totals			253	20	107	127	72	—	—	—	—	—

=== International ===
Year	Team	Event	Result	GP	G	A	Pts	PIM
2016	Finland	U17	7th	5	0	0	0	0
2017	Finland	IH18	6th	4	0	1	1	0
2018	Finland	U18	1st place, gold medalist(s)	7	0	5	5	6
2019	Finland	WJC	1st place, gold medalist(s)	6	0	0	0	2
2020	Finland	WJC	4th	7	1	1	2	4
Junior totals				29	1	7	8	12
