= 2018 IIHF World U18 Championships =

2018 IIHF U18 World Championship

Tournament details
- Host country: Russia
- Venues: 2 (in 2 host cities)
- Dates: 19–29 April
- Teams: 10

Final positions
- Champions: Finland (4th title)
- Runners-up: United States
- Third place: Sweden
- Fourth place: Czech Republic

Tournament statistics
- Games played: 30
- Goals scored: 210 (7 per game)
- Attendance: 159,176 (5,306 per game)
- Scoring leader: (United States) Jack Hughes (12 points)

Awards
- MVP: (United States) Jack Hughes

The 2018 IIHF U18 World Championship was the 20th IIHF World U18 Championship. The tournament was played from 19 to 29 April 2018 in Chelyabinsk and Magnitogorsk, Russia. United States lost the final to Finland. It was also the first time France had ever played in the top division at the U18 World Championship.

== Top Division ==
=== Match officials ===
12 referees and 10 linesmen were selected for the tournament.

Referees

- (Canada) Jonathan Alarie
- (United States) Kenneth Anderson
- (France) Geoffrey Barcelo
- (Sweden) Christoffer Holm
- (Germany) Benjamin Hoppe
- (Switzerland) Ken Mollard
- (Russia) Denis Naumov
- (Austria) Kristijan Nikolic
- (Czech Republic) Daniel Pražák
- (Slovakia) Peter Stano
- (Finland) Kristian Vikman
- (Slovenia) Milan Zrnič

Linesmen

- (Canada) Maxime Chaput
- (Czech Republic) Daniel Hynek
- (Switzerland) Balazs Kovacs
- (Germany) Jan-Christian Müller
- (Finland) Lauri Nikulainen
- (Sweden) Tobias Nordlander
- (United States) Charlie O'Connor
- (Italy) Ulrich Pardatscher
- (Russia) Nikita Shalagin
- (Russia) Dmitry Shishlo

=== Preliminary round ===
==== Group A ====
Pos	Team	Pld	W	OTW	OTL	L	GF	GA	GD	Pts	Qualification
1	Canada	4	3	1	0	0	22	9	+13	11	Advance to Quarterfinals
2	Sweden	4	3	0	1	0	12	8	+4	10	Advance to Quarterfinals
3	United States	4	2	0	0	2	21	14	+7	6	Advance to Quarterfinals
4	Belarus	4	1	0	0	3	11	24	−13	3	Advance to Quarterfinals
5	Switzerland	4	0	0	0	4	10	21	−11	0	Advance to Relegation round

Source: IIHF
Rules for classification: 1) points; 2) head-to-head points; 3) head-to-head goal difference; 4) head-to-head number of goals scored; 5) result against closest best-ranked team outside tied teams; 6) result against second-best ranked team outside tied teams; 7) seeding before tournament.

All times are local (UTC+5).

19 April 2018; 15:30	Sweden	3–1 (1–0, 2–1, 0–0)	Switzerland	Arena Metallurg, Magnitogorsk; Attendance: 2,920

Game reference

Olof Lindbom
Goalies
Luca Hollenstein
Referees:
(Czech Republic) Daniel Pražák
(Finland) Kristian Vikman
Linesmen:
(Finland) Lauri Nikulainen
(United States) Charlie O'Connor

Berggren – 15:39	1–0
Berggren (Gustafsson) – 30:00	2–0
	2–1	30:59 – Sopa (Wetter, Gross)
Berggren (Boqvist) – 31:46	3–1

20 min
Penalties
6 min
33
Shots
22

19 April 2018; 19:30	Canada	6–4 (1–1, 3–1, 2–2)	United States	Arena Metallurg, Magnitogorsk; Attendance: 7,405

Game reference

Colten Ellis
Goalies
Drew DeRidder
Referees:
(France) Geoffrey Barcelo
(Russia) Denis Naumov
Linesmen:
(Germany) Jan-Christian Müller
(Russia) Nikita Shalagin

	0–1	04:56 – Farabee (Caufield, Wise)
Lafrenière (Dellandrea) – 15:59	1–1
	1–2	24:14 – Wahlstrom (Gruden, Hughes) (PP)
Foudy – 26:11	2–2
Bahl (Noel, Hillis) – 30:14	3–2
Lavoie (McShane) – 38:04	4–2
	4–3	46:40 – Wahlstrom (York, Hughes) (PP)
	4–4	49:35 – Hughes (Gruden)
Lavoie (Foudy, McIsaac) – 51:07	5–4
Thomas (Bahl) (ENG) – 59:41	6–4

10 min
Penalties
12 min
25
Shots
35

20 April 2018; 15:30	Switzerland	5–8 (1–3, 4–3, 0–2)	United States	Arena Metallurg, Magnitogorsk; Attendance: 3,017

Game reference

Akira Schmid
Goalies
Spencer Knight
Referees:
(Austria) Kristijan Nikolic
(Slovakia) Peter Stano
Linesmen:
(Czech Republic) Daniel Hynek
(Germany) Jan-Christian Müller

	0–1	02:54 – Hughes (Gruden)
	0–2	03:35 – Janicke (Pivonka, Miller)
	0–3	04:50 – Turcotte (M. Samuelsson, Emberson)
Mettler (Sopa, Wetter) – 06:02	1–3
Mettler (Sopa, Wetter) – 20:58	2–3
	2–4	27:22 – Farabee (York)
Kohler (Nussbaumer) – 28:19	3–4
Villa (Vouillamoz, Verboon) – 28:48	4–4
Patry (Mettler, Wetter) – 34:38	5–4
	5–5	36:04 – Wahlstrom (Hughes, York) (PP)
	5–6	38:25 – Hughes (Wahlstrom)
	5–7	45:35 – Weiss (York, Stastney)
	5–8	46:49 – M. Samuelsson (Turcotte, Knight)

8 min
Penalties
10 min
19
Shots
57

20 April 2018; 19:30	Canada	8–3 (5–2, 1–0, 2–1)	Belarus	Arena Metallurg, Magnitogorsk; Attendance: 6,818

Game reference

Colten Ellis
Goalies
Nikita Tolopilo
Daniil Veremeichik
Referees:
(Czech Republic) Daniel Pražák
(Finland) Kristian Vikman
Linesmen:
(Finland) Lauri Nikulainen
(United States) Charlie O'Connor

McBain (Noel) – 01:19	1–0
	1–1	01:45 – Usov (Shkrabov)
Lavoie (Wouters) – 02:03	2–1
Lafrenière (Thomas, Byram) – 03:00	3–1
	3–2	06:48 – Protas (Kazyanin)
McIsaac (Hillis, McShane) – 12:01	4–2
Noel (Veleno, McBain) – 12:48	5–2
Foudy (McShane, Robertson) – 36:49	6–2
	6–3	40:29 – Masilevich (Pyshkailo)
Noel (Veleno, McBain) – 44:44	7–3
Dellandrea (Lafrenière) (SH) – 50:16	8–3

6 min
Penalties
10 min
28
Shots
27

21 April 2018; 15:30	Belarus	3–4 (1–0, 1–2, 1–2)	Sweden	Arena Metallurg, Magnitogorsk; Attendance: 4,691

Game reference

Nikita Tolopilo
Goalies
Jesper Eliasson
Referees:
(France) Geoffrey Barcelo
(Russia) Denis Naumov
Linesmen:
(Czech Republic) Daniel Hynek
(Russia) Nikita Shalagin

Alistrov (Barkovski, Protas) – 15:23	1–0
	1–1	22:18 – Wernblom (Bäck, Berggren) (PP2)
Borshyov (Masilevich) (PP) – 24:27	2–1
	2–2	34:12 – Boqvist (Pasic, Eliasson)
	2–3	51:21 – Pasic (Boqvist, Gustafsson) (PP)
	2–4	52:41 – Gustafsson (Boqvist, Berggren) (PP)
Oksentyuk (PP, EA) – 58:05	3–4

22 min
Penalties
12 min
26
Shots
43

22 April 2018; 15:30	United States	1–3 (1–1, 0–0, 0–2)	Sweden	Arena Metallurg, Magnitogorsk; Attendance: 5,715

Game reference

Spencer Knight
Goalies
Olof Lindbom
Referees:
(Switzerland) Ken Mollard
(Austria) Kristijan Nikolic
Linesmen:
(Czech Republic) Daniel Hynek
(Russia) Nikita Shalagin

Wahlstrom (Hughes, Farabee) (PP) – 02:25	1–0
	1–1	10:51 – Lilja (Wernblom, Bäck) (PP)
	1–2	58:26 – Wernblom (Johansson, Ginning)
	1–3	59:56 – Wernblom (Bäck) (ENG)

22 min
Penalties
10 min
37
Shots
41

22 April 2018; 19:30	Switzerland	0–5 (0–1, 0–3, 0–1)	Canada	Arena Metallurg, Magnitogorsk; Attendance: 7,354

Game reference

Akira Schmid
Goalies
Olivier Rodrigue
Referees:
(France) Geoffrey Barcelo
(Slovenia) Milan Zrnič
Linesmen:
(Sweden) Tobias Nordlander
(Russia) Dmitry Shishlo

0–1	04:44 – Lafrenière (Noel, Dellandrea)
0–2	26:24 – Dudas (McShane) (SH)
0–3	33:11 – McShane (Foudy, Tychonick) (PP)
0–4	37:46 – Wouters (Robertson, Bahl)
0–5	55:32 – Lavoie (Noel, Merkley) (PP)

26 min
Penalties
12 min
17
Shots
39

23 April 2018; 15:30	Belarus	5–4 (0–2, 2–0, 3–2)	Switzerland	Arena Metallurg, Magnitogorsk; Attendance: 3,090

Game reference

Nikita Tolopilo
Goalies
Luca Hollenstein
Referees:
(Sweden) Christoffer Holm
(Slovenia) Milan Zrnič
Linesmen:
(Germany) Jan-Christian Müller
(Russia) Dmitry Shishlo

	0–1	12:37 – Nussbaumer (Mettler, Tanner) (PP)
	0–2	16:38 – Gross (De Nisco, Barbei)
Kazyanin (Alistrov) – 27:00	1–2
Kolyachonok (Kazyanin, Alistrov) – 30:02	2–2
Azhgirei (Alistrov, Protas) – 44:56	3–2
	3–3	48:20 – Patry (Nussbaumer, Tanner) (PP)
	3–4	49:06 – Henauer (Verboon)
Levshunov (Kazyanin, Alistrov) – 58:44	4–4
Alistrov (Kazyanin, Kolyachonok) – 59:48	5–4

4 min
Penalties
4 min
33
Shots
24

24 April 2018; 15:30	United States	8–0 (2–0, 5–0, 1–0)	Belarus	Arena Metallurg, Magnitogorsk; Attendance: 4,876

Game reference

Drew DeRidder
Goalies
Kirill Andreyev
Daniil Veremeichik
Referees:
(Canada) Jonathan Alarie
(Switzerland) Ken Mollard
Linesmen:
(Canada) Maxime Chaput
(Sweden) Tobias Nordlander

Turcotte (Gruden, Caufield) (PP) – 02:19	1–0
Miller (York) – 16:57	2–0
Wahlstrom (Hughes, Farabee) – 22:13	3–0
Caufield (Wise, York) – 24:26	4–0
Farabee (Hughes, Emberson) – 26:16	5–0
Caufield (PP) – 33:13	6–0
Hain (Giles, Turcotte) – 39:02	7–0
Caufield (Turcotte) – 53:39	8–0

10 min
Penalties
10 min
43
Shots
13

24 April 2018; 19:30	Sweden	2–3 OT (1–0, 0–1, 1–1); OT: (0–1)	Canada	Arena Metallurg, Magnitogorsk; Attendance: 7,273

Game reference

Olof Lindbom
Goalies
Olivier Rodrigue
Referees:
(United States) Kenneth Anderson
(Germany) Benjamin Hoppe
Linesmen:
(Switzerland) Balazs Kovacs
(Germany) Jan-Christian Müller

Boqvist (Fagemo, Olofsson) – 10:27	1–0
	1–1	26:39 – Lavoie (McIsaac, Dellandrea)
	1–2	48:15 – Wouters (Lafrenière, Merkley)
Boqvist (Lundkvist) (PP) – 58:26	2–2
	2–3	62:27 – Lafrenière (Merkley, Veleno) (PP)

16 min
Penalties
12 min
31
Shots
40

==== Group B ====
Pos	Team	Pld	W	OTW	OTL	L	GF	GA	GD	Pts	Qualification
1	Finland	4	4	0	0	0	21	8	+13	12	Advance to Quarterfinals
2	Russia (H)	4	2	1	0	1	20	13	+7	8	Advance to Quarterfinals
3	Slovakia	4	2	0	1	1	19	14	+5	7	Advance to Quarterfinals
4	Czech Republic	4	1	0	0	3	15	14	+1	3	Advance to Quarterfinals
5	France	4	0	0	0	4	4	30	−26	0	Advance to Relegation round

Source: IIHF
Rules for classification: 1) points; 2) head-to-head points; 3) head-to-head goal difference; 4) head-to-head number of goals scored; 5) result against closest best-ranked team outside tied teams; 6) result against second-best ranked team outside tied teams; 7) seeding before tournament.
(H) Host

19 April 2018; 15:30	Slovakia	2–5 (0–1, 2–2, 0–2)	Finland	Traktor Ice Arena, Chelyabinsk; Attendance: 1,217

Game reference

Samuel Hlavaj
Goalies
Justus Annunen
Referees:
(Canada) Jonathan Alarie
(Switzerland) Ken Mollard
Linesmen:
(Canada) Maxime Chaput
(Russia) Dmitry Shishlo

	0–1	01:50 – Aaltonen (Nevasaari, Lundell)
	0–2	30:23 – Nordgren (Lundell, Tanus) (PP)
Okuliar (Čajkovič, Kováčik) – 32:19	1–2
Čajkovič (Kňažko, Kováčik) (PP) – 36:02	2–2
	2–3	39:08 – Lundell (Tanus, Utunen) (PP)
	2–4	55:18 – Utunen (Lundell, Tanus) (PP)
	2–5	59:32 – Kotkaniemi (Nordgren) (ENG)

14 min
Penalties
10 min
21
Shots
37

19 April 2018; 19:30	Russia	7–1 (4–0, 2–0, 1–1)	France	Traktor Ice Arena, Chelyabinsk; Attendance: 6,771

Game reference

Amir Miftakhov
Goalies
Valentin Duquenne
Referees:
(United States) Kenneth Anderson
(Sweden) Christoffer Holm
Linesmen:
(Switzerland) Balazs Kovacs
(Sweden) Tobias Nordlander

Kizimov (Zhabreyev, Romanov) (PP) – 06:06	1–0
Iskhakov (Marchenko, Morozov) – 08:09	2–0
Zamula (Podkolzin, Mikhailov) – 13:28	3–0
Marchenko (Galenyuk) – 13:52	4–0
Mikhailov (Podkolzin, Okhotyuk) – 33:01	5–0
Zavgorodny (Galenyuk, Zhuravlyov) – 34:05	6–0
Morozov (Marchenko) (SH) – 47:31	7–0
	7–1	58:05 – Dubé (Bruche, Quattrone) (PP)

10 min
Penalties
16 min
56
Shots
14

20 April 2018; 15:30	France	0–7 (0–0, 0–3, 0–4)	Finland	Traktor Ice Arena, Chelyabinsk; Attendance: 2,170

Game reference

Valentin Duquenne
Goalies
Jere Huhtamaa
Referees:
(Germany) Benjamin Hoppe
(Slovenia) Milan Zrnič
Linesmen:
(Italy) Ulrich Pardatscher
(Russia) Dmitry Shishlo

0–1	31:17 – Kakko
0–2	35:02 – Petman (Kakko, Salmela)
0–3	39:31 – Hirvonen (Moilanen, Petman)
0–4	47:54 – Lundell (Honka, Nevasaari)
0–5	48:16 – Kakko (Kotkaniemi, Nordgren)
0–6	51:51 – Petman (Thomson, Hirvonen)
0–7	56:43 – Nordgren (Thomson)

6 min
Penalties
10 min
10
Shots
51

20 April 2018; 19:30	Slovakia	5–2 (4–1, 1–1, 0–0)	Czech Republic	Traktor Ice Arena, Chelyabinsk; Attendance: 3,580

Game reference

Samuel Vyletelka
Goalies
Lukáš Dostál
Daniel Dvořák
Referees:
(United States) Kenneth Anderson
(Sweden) Christoffer Holm
Linesmen:
(Switzerland) Balazs Kovacs
(Sweden) Tobias Nordlander

Mrázik (PP) – 04:20	1–0
Mrázik (Dlugoš, Turan) (PP) – 06:33	2–0
	2–1	08:34 – Lauko (Klejna)
Džugan (Čajkovič, Čederle) (EA) – 13:03	3–1
Čajkovič (Bučko) – 14:12	4–1
	4–2	31:51 – Plášek (Zábranský, Střondala) (PP)
Okuliar (Čajkovič) – 32:30	5–2

18 min
Penalties
37 min
31
Shots
40

21 April 2018; 15:30	Czech Republic	2–3 (1–0, 0–1, 1–2)	Russia	Traktor Ice Arena, Chelyabinsk; Attendance: 7,498

Game reference

Lukáš Dostál
Goalies
Amir Miftakhov
Referees:
(Canada) Jonathan Alarie
(Germany) Benjamin Hoppe
Linesmen:
(Canada) Maxime Chaput
(Italy) Ulrich Pardatscher

Lauko (Pekař, Kvasnica) (PP) – 17:11	1–0
	1–1	35:26 – Morozov (Zhuravlyov, Zhabreyev) (PP)
	1–2	49:20 – Podkolzin (Mikhailov, Spiridonov)
	1–3	52:22 – Dorofeyev (Zamula, Zhilyakov)
Střondala (Gajarský, Jeník) (PP, EA) – 58:10	2–3

10 min
Penalties
26 min
23
Shots
37

22 April 2018; 15:30	Finland	5–4 (2–2, 1–2, 2–0)	Russia	Traktor Ice Arena, Chelyabinsk; Attendance: 7,496

Game reference

Justus Annunen
Goalies
Amir Miftakhov
Referees:
(Czech Republic) Daniel Pražák
(Slovakia) Peter Stano
Linesmen:
(Switzerland) Balazs Kovacs
(United States) Charlie O'Connor

Nordgren (Kotkaniemi, Kakko) – 04:52	1–0
	1–1	06:09 – Zhabreyev (Zhuravlyov, Dorofeyev)
	1–2	08:12 – Marchenko (Zhuravlyov, Miftakhov) (PP)
Tanus (Honka, Ranta) – 11:29	2–2
	2–3	35:54 – Morozov (Zhuravlyov, Zhabreyev) (PP)
	2–4	36:55 – Dorofeyev (Marchenko)
Ranta (Nevasaari, Kotkaniemi) (PP) – 39:51	3–4
Seppälä (Tanus) – 47:20	4–4
Nordgren (Kokkonen, Kotkaniemi) – 52:55	5–4

10 min
Penalties
10 min
34
Shots
21

22 April 2018; 19:30	France	1–7 (1–2, 0–3, 0–2)	Slovakia	Traktor Ice Arena, Chelyabinsk; Attendance: 4,590

Game reference

Valentin Duquenne
Adrien Vazzaz
Goalies
Samuel Vyletelka
Referees:
(Canada) Jonathan Alarie
(Germany) Benjamin Hoppe
Linesmen:
(Canada) Maxime Chaput
(Finland) Lauri Nikulainen

	0–1	11:23 – Kňažko (Čajkovič, Kováčik)
Gallet (Schmitt) (PP) – 15:04	1–1
	1–2	15:40 – Čajkovič (Okuliar)
	1–3	21:01 – Okuliar (Čajkovič, Kováčik) (PP)
	1–4	30:10 – Kňažko (Kováčik, Okuliar) (PP)
	1–5	36:53 – Paulíny (Kováčik, Čajkovič)
	1–6	41:00 – Okuliar (Čajkovič, Ilenčík)
	1–7	41:23 – Paulíny (Ferenyi, Tkáč)

8 min
Penalties
10 min
26
Shots
41

23 April 2018; 15:30	Czech Republic	9–2 (1–1, 3–1, 5–0)	France	Traktor Ice Arena, Chelyabinsk; Attendance: 3,781

Game reference

Lukáš Dostál
Goalies
Valentin Duquenne
Adrien Vazzaz
Referees:
(Slovakia) Peter Stano
(Finland) Kristian Vikman
Linesmen:
(Finland) Lauri Nikulainen
(Italy) Ulrich Pardatscher

Střondala (Klejna, Plášek) – 07:26	1–0
	1–1	18:26 – Dair (Fabre, Bruche) (PP)
	1–2	26:14 – Dubé (Quattrone)
Plášek (Zábranský, Jeník) (PP) – 27:45	2–2
Plášek (Střondala) – 31:11	3–2
Pekař (Blümel, Lauko) – 39:35	4–2
Kvasnica (Lauko, Pekař) – 42:09	5–2
Gajarský (Jeník, Doktor) – 43:14	6–2
Blümel (Čajka, Teplý) – 47:04	7–2
Kvasnica (Lauko) – 48:13	8–2
Pytlík (Teplý, Jeník) – 54:27	9–2

12 min
Penalties
10 min
47
Shots
19

24 April 2018; 15:30	Finland	4–2 (0–0, 4–0, 0–2)	Czech Republic	Traktor Ice Arena, Chelyabinsk; Attendance: 4,620

Game reference

Justus Annunen
Goalies
Daniel Dvořák
Referees:
(France) Geoffrey Barcelo
(Russia) Denis Naumov
Linesmen:
(United States) Charlie O'Connor
(Russia) Nikita Shalagin

Nordgren (Kakko) – 20:35	1–0
Kupari – 21:11	2–0
Kotkaniemi (Kakko) – 29:56	3–0
Nordgren (Kakko, Tanus) (PP2) – 37:03	4–0
	4–1	46:02 – Lauko (Zábranský, Haš) (PP)
	4–2	57:44 – Střondala (Klejna, Jeník)

39 min
Penalties
12 min
33
Shots
22

24 April 2018; 19:30	Russia	6–5 GWS (1–3, 3–1, 1–1); OT: (0–0); SO: (1–0)	Slovakia	Traktor Ice Arena, Chelyabinsk; Attendance: 7,367

Game reference

Amir Miftakhov
Daniil Isayev
Goalies
Samuel Vyletelka
Referees:
(Austria) Kristijan Nikolic
(Czech Republic) Daniel Pražák
Linesmen:
(Czech Republic) Daniel Hynek
(Italy) Ulrich Pardatscher

	0–1	13:27 – Čajkovič (Ilenčík, Okuliar) (PP2)
	0–2	15:00 – Dlugoš (Sojka, Mrázik) (PP)
	0–3	15:22 – Bučko (Tkáč)
Marchenko (Romanov, Okhotyuk) – 17:00	1–3
	1–4	28:59 – Tkáč (Paulíny)
Misyul (Malyshev, Dorofeyev) (PP) – 32:01	2–4
Romanov (Kizimov, Sorkin) – 33:32	3–4
Podkolzin (Morozov) – 34:00	4–4
	4–5	47:50 – Mrázik (Dlugoš, Džugan) (PP)
Iskhakov (Sorkin, Spiridonov) – 52:36	5–5

Marchenko (miss)
Zavgorodny (miss)
Morozov (miss)
Kizimov
Dorofeyev
Shootout
(miss) Čajkovič
(miss) Okuliar
(miss) Ferenyi
(miss) Kováčik
10 min
Penalties
12 min
45
Shots
27

=== Relegation round ===
26 April 2018; 11:30	Switzerland	5–2 (1–1, 4–0, 0–1)	France	Arena Metallurg, Magnitogorsk; Attendance: 3,086

Game reference

Luca Hollenstein
Goalies
Valentin Duquenne
Referees:
(Germany) Benjamin Hoppe
(Slovakia) Peter Stano
Linesmen:
(United States) Charlie O'Connor
(Russia) Nikita Shalagin

Kohler (Gross, Nussbaumer) (PP) – 02:40	1–0
	1–1	03:50 – Quattrone (Rousseau, Bruche)
Tanner (Patry, Kohler) (PP) – 23:35	2–1
Barandun (Sopa, Mettler) – 28:29	3–1
Patry – 31:58	4–1
Sopa (Mettler, Wetter) (PP) – 39:10	5–1
	5–2	47:12 – Allais (Leroux)

10 min
Penalties
12 min
39
Shots
22

28 April 2018; 13:30	France	0–6 (0–2, 0–2, 0–2)	Switzerland	Arena Metallurg, Magnitogorsk; Attendance: 4,650

Game reference

Valentin Duquenne
Goalies
Luca Hollenstein
Referees:
(Russia) Denis Naumov
(Finland) Kristian Vikman
Linesmen:
(Finland) Lauri Nikulainen
(Italy) Ulrich Pardatscher

0–1	14:08 – Wetter (Mettler, Sopa) (PP)
0–2	15:32 – Kohler (Barandun, Gross)
0–3	21:47 – Weibel (Barandun, Hollenstein)
0–4	27:38 – Kohler (Patry)
0–5	42:46 – Kohler (Barandun, Weibel)
0–6	50:00 – De Nisco (Kohler)

34 min
Penalties
16 min
19
Shots
40

=== Playoff round ===
==== Bracket ====
Quarterfinals
26 April
Finland	5
Belarus	2
26 April
Sweden	6
Slovakia	1
26 April
Russia	1
United States	5
26 April
Canada	1
Czech Republic	2

Semifinals
28 April
Finland	2
Sweden	0
28 April
United States	4
Czech Republic	1

Final
29 April
Finland	3
United States	2
Third place
29 April
Sweden	5
Czech Republic	2

==== Quarterfinals ====
26 April 2018; 15:30	Finland	5–2 (3–0, 2–1, 0–1)	Belarus	Traktor Ice Arena, Chelyabinsk; Attendance: 4,879

Game reference

Justus Annunen
Goalies
Nikita Tolopilo
Referees:
(France) Geoffrey Barcelo
(Austria) Kristijan Nikolic
Linesmen:
(Czech Republic) Daniel Hynek
(Germany) Jan-Christian Müller

Aaltonen (Lundell, Tanus) (PP) – 02:40	1–0
Kakko (Utunen, Kokkonen) – 10:27	2–0
Moilanen (Petman, Hirvonen) – 14:39	3–0
	3–1	21:53 – Alistrov (Protas, Kazyanin)
Nousiainen (Moilanen, Petman) – 27:39	4–1
Nordgren (PP2) – 35:52	5–1
	5–2	41:59 – Usov (Levshunov)

2 min
Penalties
14 min
39
Shots
18

26 April 2018; 15:30	Sweden	6–1 (1–0, 3–1, 2–0)	Slovakia	Arena Metallurg, Magnitogorsk; Attendance: 4,460

Game reference

Olof Lindbom
Goalies
Samuel Vyletelka
Referees:
(Russia) Denis Naumov
(Slovenia) Milan Zrnič
Linesmen:
(Switzerland) Balazs Kovacs
(Italy) Ulrich Pardatscher

Westfält (Ginning, Nässén) – 05:20	1–0
Pasic (Lundkvist, Berggren) (PP) – 29:19	2–0
Gustafsson (Berggren) (PP) – 34:38	3–0
	3–1	37:37 – Dlugoš (Turan, Okuliar) (PP2)
Berggren (Pasic) – 39:58	4–1
Wernblom – 45:16	5–1
Berggren (Olofsson) – 57:36	6–1

8 min
Penalties
6 min
42
Shots
26

26 April 2018; 19:30	Russia	1–5 (0–1, 1–0, 0–4)	United States	Traktor Ice Arena, Chelyabinsk; Attendance: 7,499

Game reference

Amir Miftakhov
Goalies
Spencer Knight
Referees:
(Canada) Jonathan Alarie
(Sweden) Christoffer Holm
Linesmen:
(Canada) Maxime Chaput
(Sweden) Tobias Nordlander

	0–1	08:47 – Caufield (Wise, Emberson)
Iskhakov – 22:26	1–1
	1–2	52:55 – Farabee (Stastney) (SH)
	1–3	57:22 – Wahlstrom (Hughes, Stastney)
	1–4	58:43 – Wise (ENG)
	1–5	59:53 – Hughes (ENG)

2 min
Penalties
6 min
17
Shots
41

26 April 2018; 19:30	Canada	1–2 (0–1, 0–0, 1–1)	Czech Republic	Arena Metallurg, Magnitogorsk; Attendance: 6,530

Game reference

Olivier Rodrigue
Goalies
Lukáš Dostál
Referees:
(Switzerland) Ken Mollard
(Finland) Kristian Vikman
Linesmen:
(Finland) Lauri Nikulainen
(Russia) Dmitry Shishlo

	0–1	11:30 – Blümel (Čajka, Pekař)
	0–2	50:03 – Čajka (Pekař, Blümel)
Dellandrea (McShane, Tychonick) – 53:19	1–2

14 min
Penalties
8 min
34
Shots
31

==== Semifinals ====
28 April 2018; 15:30	Finland	2–0 (2–0, 0–0, 0–0)	Sweden	Traktor Ice Arena, Chelyabinsk; Attendance: 6,052

Game reference
Justus Annunen	Goalies	Olof Lindbom	Referees: (United States) Kenneth Anderson (Czech Republic) Daniel Pražák; Linesmen: (Czech Republic) Daniel Hynek (Switzerland) Balazs Kovacs
Hirvonen (Moilanen, Kokkonen) – 07:46 / 1–0; Kotkaniemi (Kakko, Honka) (PP) – 17:19 / 2–0			Referees: (United States) Kenneth Anderson (Czech Republic) Daniel Pražák; Linesmen: (Czech Republic) Daniel Hynek (Switzerland) Balazs Kovacs
6 min	Penalties	8 min	Referees: (United States) Kenneth Anderson (Czech Republic) Daniel Pražák; Linesmen: (Czech Republic) Daniel Hynek (Switzerland) Balazs Kovacs
31	Shots	29	Referees: (United States) Kenneth Anderson (Czech Republic) Daniel Pražák; Linesmen: (Czech Republic) Daniel Hynek (Switzerland) Balazs Kovacs

28 April 2018; 19:30	United States	4–1 (1–0, 2–1, 1–0)	Czech Republic	Traktor Ice Arena, Chelyabinsk; Attendance: 6,459

Game reference

Spencer Knight
Goalies
Lukáš Dostál
Referees:
(Canada) Jonathan Alarie
(Sweden) Christoffer Holm
Linesmen:
(Sweden) Tobias Nordlander
(Russia) Dmitry Shishlo

Hughes (Wahlstrom, Farabee) – 03:37	1–0
Wahlstrom (Farabee) – 21:04	2–0
	2–1	30:54 – Zábranský (Kvasnica, Jeník)
Stastney (Wise, Miller) – 35:47	3–1
Weiss (Stastney) – 42:48	4–1

4 min
Penalties
8 min
47
Shots
17

==== Bronze medal game ====
29 April 2018; 15:30	Sweden	5–2 (3–1, 1–1, 1–0)	Czech Republic	Traktor Ice Arena, Chelyabinsk; Attendance: 5,813

Game reference

Olof Lindbom
Goalies
Daniel Dvořák
Referees:
(Canada) Jonathan Alarie
(United States) Kenneth Anderson
Linesmen:
(Switzerland) Balazs Kovacs
(Russia) Dmitry Shishlo

Bäck (Ginning, Andersson) – 04:48	1–0
Pasic (Gustafsson, Berggren) (PP) – 08:17	2–0
	2–1	13:42 – Plášek (Zábranský, Haš) (PP)
Westfält (Gustafsson, Pasic) (PP) – 16:17	3–1
	3–2	25:57 – Teplý (Kropáček, Pytlík)
Johansson (Fagemo, Olofsson) (PP) – 30:57	4–2
Ginning (Andersson, Gustafsson) – 45:31	5–2

14 min
Penalties
12 min
38
Shots
40

==== Final ====
29 April 2018; 19:30	Finland	3–2 (2–1, 0–1, 1–0)	United States	Traktor Ice Arena, Chelyabinsk; Attendance: 7,499

Game reference

Justus Annunen
Goalies
Spencer Knight
Referees:
(Czech Republic) Daniel Pražák
(Slovakia) Peter Stano
Linesmen:
(Canada) Maxime Chaput
(Sweden) Tobias Nordlander

Kupari (Honka, Kotkaniemi) (PP) – 09:13	1–0
Kakko (Honka, Kupari) (PP) – 12:33	2–0
	2–1	16:53 – Giles (Weiss, Emberson)
	2–2	28:24 – Janicke (Pivonka, Weiss)
Nordgren (Kotkaniemi) (SH) – 50:41	3–2

8 min
Penalties
8 min
28
Shots
28

=== Final standings ===
Pos	Grp	Team	Pld	W	OTW	OTL	L	GF	GA	GD	Pts	Final result
1	B	Finland	7	7	0	0	0	31	12	+19	21	Champions
2	A	United States	7	4	0	0	3	32	19	+13	12	Runners-up
3	A	Sweden	7	5	0	1	1	23	13	+10	16	Third place
4	B	Czech Republic	7	2	0	0	5	20	24	−4	6	Fourth place
5	A	Canada	5	3	1	0	1	23	11	+12	11	Eliminated in Quarterfinals
6	B	Russia (H)	5	2	1	0	2	21	18	+3	8	Eliminated in Quarterfinals
7	B	Slovakia	5	2	0	1	2	20	20	0	7	Eliminated in Quarterfinals
8	A	Belarus	5	1	0	0	4	13	29	−16	3	Eliminated in Quarterfinals
9	A	Switzerland	6	2	0	0	4	21	23	−2	6	
10	B	France	6	0	0	0	6	6	41	−35	0	Relegated to 2019 Division I A

Source: IIHF
(H) Host

=== Statistics ===
==== Scoring leaders ====
List shows the top ten skaters sorted by points, then goals.

Player	GP	G	A	Pts	+/−	PIM
(United States) Jack Hughes	7	5	7	12	+3	2
(Slovakia) Maxim Čajkovič	5	4	7	11	+7	6
(Finland) Niklas Nordgren	7	8	2	10	+10	4
(Sweden) Jonatan Berggren	7	5	5	10	+7	2
(Finland) Kaapo Kakko	7	4	6	10	+8	2
(United States) Oliver Wahlstrom	7	7	2	9	+2	4
(Finland) Jesperi Kotkaniemi	7	3	6	9	+9	37
(Slovakia) Oliver Okuliar	5	4	4	8	+5	6
(United States) Joel Farabee	7	4	4	8	+1	6
(Switzerland) Gilian Kohler	5	5	2	7	+1	2

GP = Games played; G = Goals; A = Assists; Pts = Points; +/− = Plus–minus; PIM = Penalties In Minutes
Source: IIHF.com

==== Leading goaltenders ====
Only the top five goaltenders, based on save percentage, who have played 40% of their team's minutes are included in this list.

Player	TOI	SA	GA	GAA	Sv%	SO
(Canada) Olivier Rodrigue	180:57	79	4	1.33	94.94	1
(Sweden) Olof Lindbom	361:16	196	10	1.66	94.90	0
(Finland) Justus Annunen	360:00	139	12	2.00	91.37	1
(Switzerland) Luca Hollenstein	237:58	107	10	2.52	90.65	1
(Czech Republic) Lukáš Dostál	251:18	148	14	3.34	90.54	0

TOI = Time on ice (minutes:seconds); SA = Shots against; GA = Goals against; GAA = Goals against average; Sv% = Save percentage; SO = Shutouts
Source: IIHF.com

=== Tournament awards ===
Most Valuable Player

- Forward: (United States) Jack Hughes

All-star team

- Goaltender: (Sweden) Olof Lindbom
- Defencemen: (United States) Cameron York, (Russia) Anton Malyshev
- Forwards: (United States) Jack Hughes, (United States) Oliver Wahlstrom, (Finland) Niklas Nordgren

Source: IIHF.com

IIHF best player awards

- Goaltender: (Sweden) Olof Lindbom
- Defenceman: (Sweden) Adam Boqvist
- Forward: (United States) Jack Hughes

Source: IIHF.com

== Division I ==
=== Division I A ===
The Division I A tournament was played in Riga, Latvia, from 2 to 8 April 2018.

Pos	Team	Pld	W	OTW	OTL	L	GF	GA	GD	Pts	Promotion or relegation
1	Latvia (H)	5	5	0	0	0	14	4	+10	15	Promoted to the 2019 Top Division
2	Germany	5	4	0	0	1	22	11	+11	12	
3	Denmark	5	2	0	0	3	14	19	−5	6 (Note: Kazakhstan 2–4 Denmark)	
4	Kazakhstan	5	2	0	0	3	15	10	+5	6	
5	Norway	5	1	0	0	4	14	18	−4	3 (Note: Slovenia 0–5 Norway)	
6	Slovenia	5	1	0	0	4	7	24	−17	3	Relegated to the 2019 Division I B

Source: IIHF
Rules for classification: 1) points; 2) head-to-head points; 3) head-to-head goal difference; 4) head-to-head number of goals scored; 5) result against closest best-ranked team outside tied teams; 6) result against second-best ranked team outside tied teams; 7) seeding before tournament.
(H) Host

=== Division I B ===
The Division I B tournament was played in Kyiv, Ukraine, from 14 to 20 April 2018.

Pos	Team	Pld	W	OTW	OTL	L	GF	GA	GD	Pts	Promotion or relegation
1	Ukraine (H)	5	4	0	0	1	18	8	+10	12 (Note: Austria 3–5 Ukraine)	Promoted to the 2019 Division I A
2	Austria	5	4	0	0	1	20	7	+13	12	
3	Japan	5	2	2	0	1	12	11	+1	10	
4	Hungary	5	2	0	1	2	14	11	+3	7	
5	Italy	5	1	0	1	3	11	13	−2	4	
6	Romania	5	0	0	0	5	5	30	−25	0	Relegated to the 2019 Division II A

Source: IIHF
Rules for classification: 1) points; 2) head-to-head points; 3) head-to-head goal difference; 4) head-to-head number of goals scored; 5) result against closest best-ranked team outside tied teams; 6) result against second-best ranked team outside tied teams; 7) seeding before tournament.
(H) Host

== Division II ==
=== Division II A ===
The Division II A tournament was played in Tallinn, Estonia, from 1 to 7 April 2018.

Pos	Team	Pld	W	OTW	OTL	L	GF	GA	GD	Pts	Promotion or relegation
1	Great Britain	5	4	0	0	1	26	15	+11	12 (Note: Great Britain 3−2 Lithuania)	Promoted to the 2019 Division I B
2	Lithuania	5	4	0	0	1	22	8	+14	12	
3	Poland	5	3	1	0	1	32	11	+21	11	
4	South Korea	5	2	0	0	3	12	14	−2	6	
5	Estonia (H)	5	1	0	1	3	17	21	−4	4	
6	Australia	5	0	0	0	5	4	44	−40	0	Relegated to the 2019 Division II B

Source: IIHF
Rules for classification: 1) points; 2) head-to-head points; 3) head-to-head goal difference; 4) head-to-head number of goals scored; 5) result against closest best-ranked team outside tied teams; 6) result against second-best ranked team outside tied teams; 7) seeding before tournament.
(H) Host

=== Division II B ===
The Division II B tournament was played in Zagreb, Croatia, from 24 to 30 March 2018.

Pos	Team	Pld	W	OTW	OTL	L	GF	GA	GD	Pts	Promotion or relegation
1	Spain	5	4	1	0	0	27	13	+14	14	Promoted to the 2019 Division II A
2	Croatia (H)	5	2	1	0	2	13	12	+1	8 (Note: Serbia 1–2 Croatia)	
3	Serbia	5	2	0	2	1	16	11	+5	8	
4	Netherlands	5	1	2	0	2	18	18	0	7 (Note: China 5–6 (GWS) Netherlands)	
5	China	5	2	0	1	2	16	19	−3	7	
6	Iceland	5	0	0	1	4	9	26	−17	1	Relegated to the 2019 Division III A

Source: IIHF
Rules for classification: 1) points; 2) head-to-head points; 3) head-to-head goal difference; 4) head-to-head number of goals scored; 5) result against closest best-ranked team outside tied teams; 6) result against second-best ranked team outside tied teams; 7) seeding before tournament.
(H) Host

== Division III ==
=== Division III A ===
The Division III A tournament was played in Erzurum, Turkey, from 26 March to 1 April 2018.

Pos	Team	Pld	W	OTW	OTL	L	GF	GA	GD	Pts	Promotion or relegation
1	Belgium	5	4	0	0	1	35	8	+27	12	Promoted to the 2019 Division II B
2	Mexico	5	3	1	0	1	17	12	+5	11	
3	Bulgaria	5	2	0	1	2	17	19	−2	7	
4	Israel	5	1	1	1	2	12	13	−1	6 (Note: Israel 2–0 Turkey)	
5	Turkey (H)	5	2	0	0	3	11	14	−3	6	
6	Chinese Taipei	5	0	1	1	3	16	42	−26	3	Relegated to the 2019 Division III B

Source: IIHF
Rules for classification: 1) points; 2) head-to-head points; 3) head-to-head goal difference; 4) head-to-head number of goals scored; 5) result against closest best-ranked team outside tied teams; 6) result against second-best ranked team outside tied teams; 7) seeding before tournament.
(H) Host

=== Division III B ===
The Division III B tournament was played in Queenstown, New Zealand, from 26 to 28 April 2018.

Pos	Team	Pld	W	OTW	OTL	L	GF	GA	GD	Pts	Promotion
1	New Zealand (H)	2	2	0	0	0	12	6	+6	6	Promoted to the 2019 Division III A
2	Hong Kong	2	1	0	0	1	9	10	−1	3	
3	South Africa	2	0	0	0	2	3	8	−5	0	

Source: IIHF
Rules for classification: 1) points; 2) head-to-head points; 3) head-to-head goal difference; 4) head-to-head number of goals scored; 5) result against closest best-ranked team outside tied teams; 6) result against second-best ranked team outside tied teams; 7) seeding before tournament.
(H) Host
