= Ivan Morozov (ice hockey) =

Russian ice hockey player (born 2000)

- Born: 5 May 2000 (age 26) Verkhnyaya Salda, Russia
- Height: 6 ft 1 in (185 cm)
- Weight: 196 lb (89 kg; 14 st 0 lb)
- Position: Centre
- Shoots: Right
- KHL team Former teams: Free agent HC Yugra; SKA Saint Petersburg; HC Sochi; Spartak Moscow
- National team: Russia
- NHL draft: 61st overall, 2018; Vegas Golden Knights
- Playing career: 2018–present

Ivan Dmitriyevich Morozov (Russian: Иван Дмитриевич Морозов; born 5 May 2000) is a Russian professional ice hockey forward who is currently an unrestricted free agent. He most recently played for HC Spartak Moscow in the Kontinental Hockey League (KHL). He was selected 61st overall in the second round of the 2018 NHL entry draft by the Vegas Golden Knights.

== Playing career ==
During the 2019–20 campaign, Morozov continued to develop as a key player for SKA Saint Petersburg. Recognizing his growth and potential, the club extended his commitment by offering him a new two-year contract. Morozov officially signed the extension on January 29, 2020.

In the 2021–22 season, Morozov tallied 4 goals and 8 points over 17 games with SKA before being traded to HC Sochi on December 27, 2021, for the rest of the season. With more responsibilities and playing time at Sochi, he contributed 1 goal and 3 points in only 5 games.

On April 26, 2022, Morozov inked a two-year entry-level deal with the Vegas Golden Knights. Soon after, he joined their American Hockey League (AHL) affiliate, the Henderson Silver Knights, on a professional try-out contract to complete the remainder of the 2021–22 AHL season.

After spending the entire 2022–23 season with the Henderson Silver Knights, Morozov arranged a return to the KHL for the 2023–24 campaign, joining HC Spartak Moscow on loan from the Golden Knights on July 10, 2023. He later committed to Spartak by signing a two-year contract extension on June 17, 2024. Entering the 2025–26 season, Morozov was suspended indefinitely for doping, with unconfirmed reports that he had tested positive for cocaine use.

== Career statistics ==
=== Regular season and playoffs ===
			Regular season					Playoffs
Season	Team	League	GP	G	A	Pts	PIM	GP	G	A	Pts	PIM
2017–18	Mamonty Yugry	MHL	30	11	12	23	8	7	2	3	5	6
2017–18	HC Yugra	KHL	1	0	0	0	0	—	—	—	—	—
2018–19	SKA-Varyagi im. Morozova	MHL	6	3	5	8	6	—	—	—	—	—
2018–19	SKA-1946	MHL	14	10	9	19	8	10	3	9	12	6
2018–19	SKA-Neva	VHL	19	3	3	6	4	1	0	0	0	0
2018–19	SKA Saint Petersburg	KHL	11	0	0	0	0	2	0	0	0	0
2019–20	SKA-1946	MHL	3	2	1	3	0	—	—	—	—	—
2019–20	SKA-Neva	VHL	10	1	5	6	10	1	1	1	2	2
2019–20	SKA Saint Petersburg	KHL	16	5	2	7	9	4	1	2	3	4
2020–21	SKA Saint Petersburg	KHL	55	13	18	31	24	15	1	6	7	33
2021–22	SKA Saint Petersburg	KHL	17	4	4	8	4	—	—	—	—	—
2021–22	SKA-Neva	VHL	15	4	15	19	14	—	—	—	—	—
2021–22	HC Sochi	KHL	5	1	2	3	6	—	—	—	—	—
2021–22	Henderson Silver Knights	AHL	1	0	0	0	0	2	0	1	1	0
2022–23	Henderson Silver Knights	AHL	58	7	11	18	53	—	—	—	—	—
2023–24	Spartak Moscow	KHL	37	11	27	38	27	11	3	5	8	10
2024–25	Spartak Moscow	KHL	64	19	31	50	34	12	5	7	12	8
2025–26	Spartak Moscow	KHL	44	11	17	28	49	5	2	3	5	2
KHL totals			250	64	101	165	152	49	12	23	35	57

Medal record

Representing Russia

Ice hockey

World Junior Championships
Silver medal – second place	2020 Czech Republic	
Bronze medal – third place	2019 United States	

=== International ===
Year	Team	Event	Result	GP	G	A	Pts	PIM
2018	Russia	U18	6th	5	3	2	5	14
2019	Russia	WJC	3rd place, bronze medalist(s)	7	1	1	2	0
2020	Russia	WJC	2nd place, silver medalist(s)	7	2	1	3	2
2021	ROC	WC	5th	8	1	2	3	2
Junior totals				19	6	4	10	16
Senior totals				8	1	2	3	2
