= Kirill Marchenko =

Russian ice hockey player (born 2000)

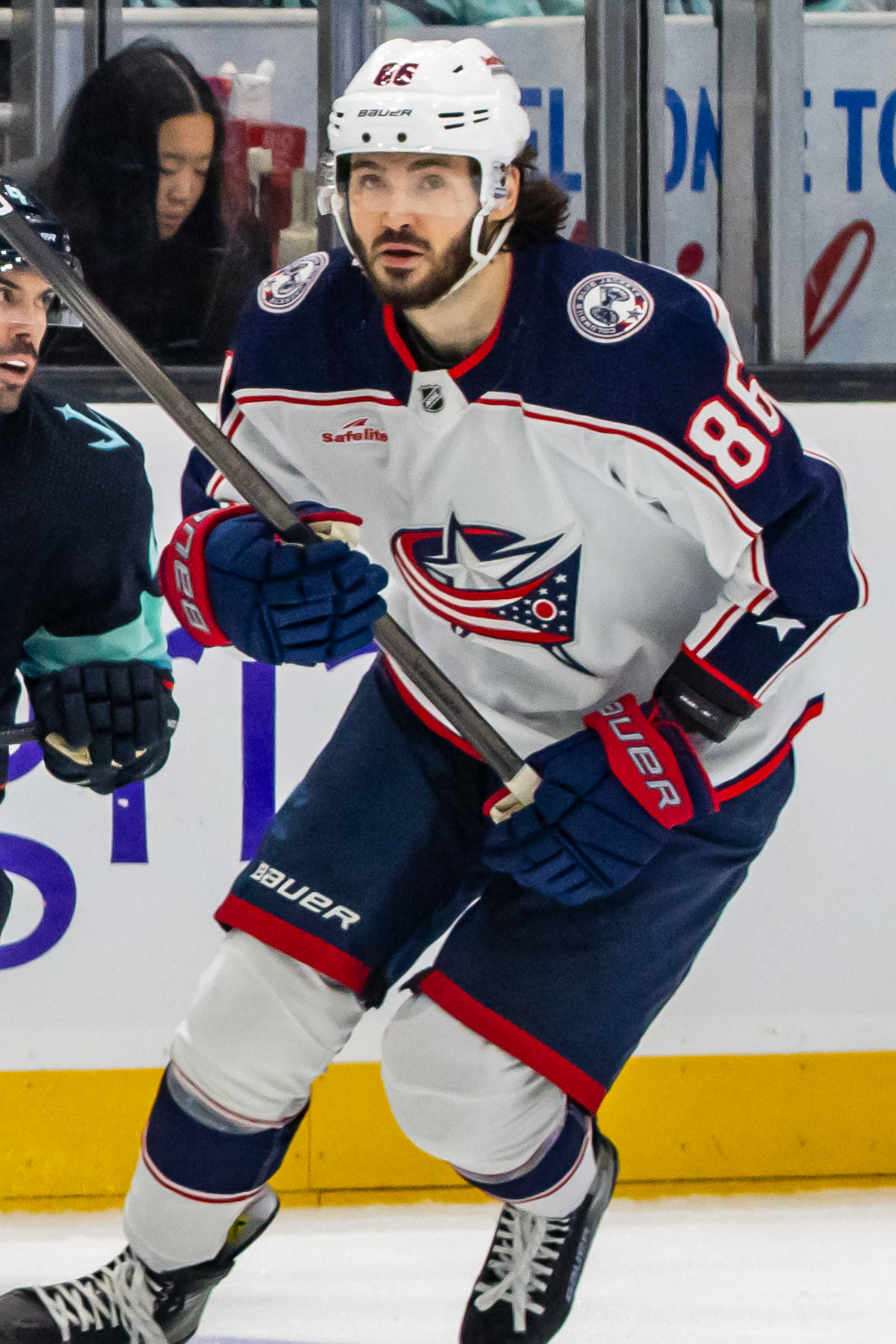
- Marchenko with the Columbus Blue Jackets in 2024
- Born: 21 July 2000 (age 26) Barnaul, Russia
- Height: 6 ft 3 in (191 cm)
- Weight: 187 lb (85 kg; 13 st 5 lb)
- Position: Winger
- Shoots: Right
- NHL team Former teams: Toronto Maple Leafs; HC Yugra; SKA Saint Petersburg; Columbus Blue Jackets
- NHL draft: 49th overall, 2018; Columbus Blue Jackets
- Playing career: 2017–present

Kirill Igorevich Marchenko (Russian: Кирилл Игоревич Марченко; born 21 July 2000) is a Russian professional ice hockey player who is a winger for Toronto Maple Leafs of the National Hockey League (NHL). Marchenko was selected by the Columbus Blue Jackets with the 49th overall pick in the 2018 NHL entry draft.

== Playing career ==
=== Kontinental Hockey League ===
Marchenko made his debut in the Kontinental Hockey League (KHL) during the 2017–18 season, with HC Yugra.

He played four seasons in the KHL with SKA Saint Petersburg; after the 2021–22 KHL season, he opted to pursue a North American career in agreeing to a two-year, entry level contract with draft club, the Columbus Blue Jackets, on 2 May 2022.

=== National Hockey League ===
After participating in the Blue Jackets training camp, Marchenko was reassigned to their American Hockey League (AHL) affiliate, the Cleveland Monsters. Through his first 16 games in the AHL, Marchenko accumulated eight goals and 11 assists for 19 points. He was recalled to the NHL level for the first time on 5 December 2022 for their game against the Pittsburgh Penguins. He made his NHL debut the following night, where he played 12 shifts through 10:03 minutes of ice time. After making his NHL debut, he went scoreless through his next three games before scoring his first NHL goal against the Los Angeles Kings on 11 December. On 7 January 2023, Marchenko recorded his first NHL hat trick in a Columbus win against the Carolina Hurricanes. He became the first rookie of the 2022–23 season to score a hat-trick and the sixth in franchise history. Although he would experience a six-game scoring drought in mid-January, he scored 13 goals through his first 29 games. On 11 February 2023, Marchenko recorded his first NHL assist in a game against the Toronto Maple Leafs. He subsequently became the third player in NHL history to have his first 13 career points be only goals. After scoring the game winning goal in overtime on 2 April 2023, Marchenko became the franchise leader in goals by a rookie with 21.

On 19 December 2023, Marchenko recorded a natural hat trick against the Buffalo Sabres.

On 28 July 2024, Marchenko signed a three-year, $11.55 million contract with Columbus.

On 28 September 2026, Marchenko was traded to the Toronto Maple Leafs, as part of a package that sent Matthew Knies to Columbus.

== Career statistics ==
=== Regular season and playoffs ===
| | | | Regular season | | | | | Playoffs |
| Season | Team | League | GP | G | A | Pts | PIM | GP | G | A | Pts | PIM |
|---|---|---|---|---|---|---|---|---|---|---|---|---|
| 2016–17 | Mamonty Yugry | MHL | 29 | 15 | 11 | 26 | 2 | — | — | — | — | — |
| 2017–18 | Mamonty Yugry | MHL | 31 | 8 | 8 | 16 | 33 | — | — | — | — | — |
| 2017–18 | HC Yugra | KHL | 2 | 0 | 0 | 0 | 0 | — | — | — | — | — |
| 2018–19 | SKA-Neva | VHL | 23 | 1 | 2 | 3 | 4 | 3 | 0 | 0 | 0 | 0 |
| 2018–19 | SKA-Varyagi im. Morozova | MHL | 5 | 2 | 2 | 4 | 4 | — | — | — | — | — |
| 2018–19 | SKA-1946 | MHL | 15 | 6 | 13 | 19 | 4 | 9 | 4 | 2 | 6 | 6 |
| 2018–19 | SKA Saint Petersburg | KHL | 1 | 0 | 0 | 0 | 0 | — | — | — | — | — |
| 2019–20 | SKA Saint Petersburg | KHL | 31 | 7 | 9 | 16 | 6 | 4 | 3 | 2 | 5 | 2 |
| 2019–20 | SKA-Neva | VHL | 14 | 9 | 3 | 12 | 4 | 1 | 1 | 0 | 1 | 2 |
| 2020–21 | SKA Saint Petersburg | KHL | 41 | 15 | 13 | 28 | 14 | 14 | 3 | 1 | 4 | 4 |
| 2020–21 | SKA-1946 | MHL | 2 | 3 | 4 | 7 | 0 | — | — | — | — | — |
| 2021–22 | SKA Saint Petersburg | KHL | 39 | 12 | 8 | 20 | 13 | — | — | — | — | — |
| 2021–22 | SKA-Neva | VHL | 2 | 1 | 2 | 3 | 2 | 12 | 6 | 2 | 8 | 12 |
| 2022–23 | Cleveland Monsters | AHL | 16 | 8 | 11 | 19 | 8 | — | — | — | — | — |
| 2022–23 | Columbus Blue Jackets | NHL | 59 | 21 | 4 | 25 | 16 | — | — | — | — | — |
| 2023–24 | Columbus Blue Jackets | NHL | 78 | 23 | 19 | 42 | 14 | — | — | — | — | — |
| 2024–25 | Columbus Blue Jackets | NHL | 79 | 31 | 43 | 74 | 20 | — | — | — | — | — |
| 2025–26 | Columbus Blue Jackets | NHL | 76 | 27 | 40 | 67 | 32 | — | — | — | — | — |
| KHL totals | | | 114 | 34 | 30 | 64 | 33 | 18 | 6 | 3 | 9 | 6 |
| NHL totals | | | 292 | 102 | 106 | 208 | 82 | — | — | — | — | — |

=== International ===
Medal record

Men's ice hockey

Representing Russia

World Junior Championships
| Silver medal – second place | 2020 Czech Republic | |
| Bronze medal – third place | 2019 Canada | |

| Year | Team | Event | Result | GP | G | A | Pts | PIM |
|---|---|---|---|---|---|---|---|---|
| 2018 | Russia | U18 | 6th | 5 | 3 | 3 | 6 | 4 |
| 2019 | Russia | WJC | 3rd place, bronze medalist(s) | 7 | 1 | 0 | 1 | 0 |
| 2020 | Russia | WJC | 2nd place, silver medalist(s) | 7 | 2 | 4 | 6 | 2 |
| Junior totals | | | | 19 | 6 | 7 | 13 | 6 |
