= Peetro Seppälä =

Finnish ice hockey player (born 2000)

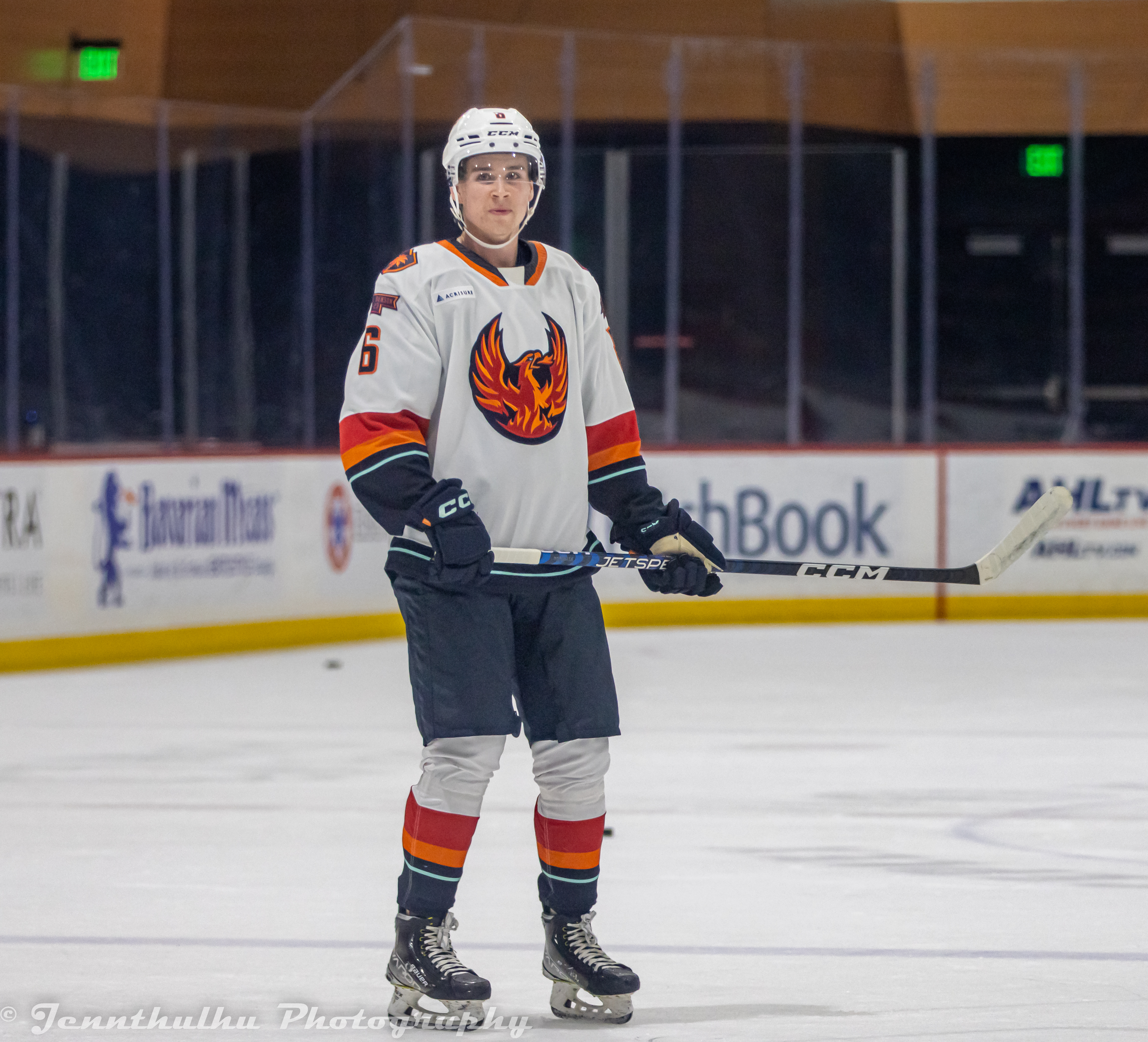
- Seppälä with the Coachella Valley Firebirds in 2022
- Born: August 17, 2000 (age 24); Kuusankoski, Finland
- Height: 6 ft 2 in (188 cm)
- Weight: 192 lb (87 kg; 13 st 10 lb)
- Position: Defenseman
- Shoots: Left
- SHL team Former teams: Örebro HK; KooKoo
- NHL draft: Undrafted
- Playing career: 2017–present

Peetro Seppälä (born August 17, 2000) is a Finnish professional ice hockey defenseman for Örebro HK of the Swedish Hockey League (SHL).

== Playing career ==
Seppälä played junior hockey with KooKoo of the SM-sarja. In the 2015–16 season, he was the captain of the club's C-youth team. In August 2016, at only 15-years-old, Seppälä signed a two-year contract with KooKoo, although he played most of the 2016–17 season in the club's A-youth and strengthened B-youth teams.

In the 2017–18 season, Seppälä made his debut in KooKoo's Liiga team. At the age of 17, Seppälä made his league debut on December 13, 2017, away against Tappara. In the same month, Seppälä then signed a two-year contract extension with KooKoo. During the season, he played six regular season matches in the Liiga without scoring points. Seppälä played most of his season in KooKoo's A-youth.

In his actual Liiga rookie season in 2018–19, Seppälä managed 5 points in 31 regular season games. He scored the first goal of his Liiga career on January 4, 2019, away at Tampere Ilves. For about half of the season, Seppälä still played in KooKoo's A-youth team. During the 2019–20 season, he established his place in the Liiga, where he got 12 points in 41 games. In November 2019, he was sidelined for about a month due to an injury. In February 2020, Seppälä signed another two-year contract extension with KooKoo. In October of the 2020–21 season, Seppälä was sidelined for about a month after JYP Jyväskylä's Samuel Helenius tackled him in the head. During the 2021–22 season, he made his breakthrough in the Liiga as he was KooKoo's best defenseman, with 29 points.

In May 2022, Seppälä signed a two-year contract with Ilves. Only five days later, he signed a two-year, entry-level contract with the Seattle Kraken. At the end of the Kraken's training camp, Seppälä was sent to the Coachella Valley Firebirds of the American Hockey League (AHL).

== International play ==
Medal record

Representing Finland

Ice hockey

World U18 Championship
Gold medal – first place	2018 Russia	

Seppälä played in the 2018 IIHF World U18 Championships, where he won the gold medal with Finland. He also played in the 2020 World Junior Ice Hockey Championships.

== Career statistics ==
=== Regular season and playoffs ===
			Regular season					Playoffs
Season	Team	League	GP	G	A	Pts	PIM	GP	G	A	Pts	PIM
2016–17	KooKoo	Jr. A	30	3	3	6	10	—	—	—	—	—
2017–18	KooKoo	Jr. A	47	2	3	15	57	3	0	3	3	14
2017–18	KooKoo	Liiga	6	0	0	0	0	—	—	—	—	—
2018–19	KooKoo	Jr. A	30	4	15	19	34	—	—	—	—	—
2018–19	KooKoo	Liiga	31	2	3	5	14	—	—	—	—	—
2019–20	KooKoo	Jr. A	2	0	2	2	0	—	—	—	—	—
2019–20	KooKoo	Liiga	41	2	10	12	24	—	—	—	—	—
2020–21	KooKoo	Liiga	39	3	5	8	26	2	0	0	0	4
2021–22	KooKoo	Liiga	57	8	21	29	30	15	0	8	8	4
2022–23	Coachella Valley Firebirds	AHL	70	1	11	12	51	—	—	—	—	—
2023–24	Coachella Valley Firebirds	AHL	49	1	10	11	14	—	—	—	—	—
2024–25	Örebro HK	SHL	51	3	13	16	16	3	0	1	1	0
Liiga totals			174	15	39	54	94	17	0	8	8	8
SHL totals			51	3	13	16	16	3	0	1	1	0

=== International ===
Year	Team	Event	Result	GP	G	A	Pts	PIM
2018	Finland	U18	1st place, gold medalist(s)	5	1	0	1	2
2020	Finland	WJC	4th	7	0	0	0	4
Junior totals				12	1	0	1	6
