= Nikola Pasic (ice hockey) =

Swedish ice hockey player (born 2000)

- Born: 16 October 2000 (age 24); Gislaved, Sweden
- Height: 5 ft 10 in (178 cm)
- Weight: 181 lb (82 kg; 12 st 13 lb)
- Position: Winger/Centre
- Shoots: Left
- SHL team Former teams: HV71; Linköping HC; Luleå HF; Malmö Redhawks
- NHL draft: 189th overall, 2019; New Jersey Devils
- Playing career: 2018–present

Nikola Pasic (Serbian: Никола Пашић, Nikola Pašić; born 16 October 2000) is a Swedish professional ice hockey forward currently playing for HV71 of the Swedish Hockey League (SHL). Pasic was drafted 189th overall by the New Jersey Devils in the 2019 NHL Entry Draft.

== Playing career ==
Pasic made his Swedish Hockey League (SHL) debut with Linköping HC during the 2017–18 SHL season, appearing in 3 regular season games. During the following 2018–19 season, Pasic made 15 appearances with the club before he was loaned to continue his development to BIK Karlskoga of the HockeyAllsvenskan.

He secured a season-long loan to BIK for the 2019–20 season, responding by posting an impressive 27 assists and 35 points as a 19-year old in 45 games.

During the 2021–22 season, after going scoreless through 13 games with Linköping HC in a reduced role, Pasic left the club and joined second tier Allsvenskan club, Södertälje SK, on 6 December 2021.

After a lone season with Malmö Redhawks in 2024–25, having contributing with career best offensive totals with 8 goals and 24 points in 50 regular season games, Pasic left as a free agent and was signed to a three-year contract with HV71 on 9 June 2025.

== Personal life ==
He is of Serbian descent.

Medal record

Representing Sweden

Ice hockey

World Junior Championships
Bronze medal – third place	2020 Czech Republic	

World U18 Championships
Bronze medal – third place	2018 Russia	

== Career statistics ==
=== Regular season and playoffs ===
			Regular season					Playoffs
Season	Team	League	GP	G	A	Pts	PIM	GP	G	A	Pts	PIM
2016–17	Linköping HC	J20	2	0	0	0	0	—	—	—	—	—
2017–18	Linköping HC	J20	43	10	11	21	2	3	1	0	1	0
2017–18	Linköping HC	SHL	3	0	0	0	0	—	—	—	—	—
2018–19	Linköping HC	J20	33	18	18	36	6	6	2	3	5	0
2018–19	Linköping HC	SHL	15	1	1	2	0	—	—	—	—	—
2018–19	BIK Karlskoga	Allsv	2	0	1	1	0	—	—	—	—	—
2019–20	BIK Karlskoga	Allsv	45	8	27	35	10	1	0	0	0	0
2020–21	Linköping HC	SHL	52	7	8	15	0	—	—	—	—	—
2021–22	Linköping HC	SHL	13	0	0	0	0	—	—	—	—	—
2021–22	Södertälje SK	Allsv	29	6	9	15	0	—	—	—	—	—
2022–23	Södertälje SK	Allsv	51	18	34	52	14	—	—	—	—	—
2023–24	Luleå HF	SHL	52	3	16	19	0	7	0	0	0	0
2024–25	Malmö Redhawks	SHL	50	8	16	24	12	8	0	0	0	2
SHL totals			185	19	41	60	12	15	0	0	0	2

=== International ===
Year	Team	Event	Result	GP	G	A	Pts	PIM
2018	Sweden	U18	3rd place, bronze medalist(s)	7	3	3	6	2
2020	Sweden	WJC	3rd place, bronze medalist(s)	7	0	1	1	0
Junior totals				14	3	4	7	2
