= Jacob Olofsson =

Swedish ice hockey player

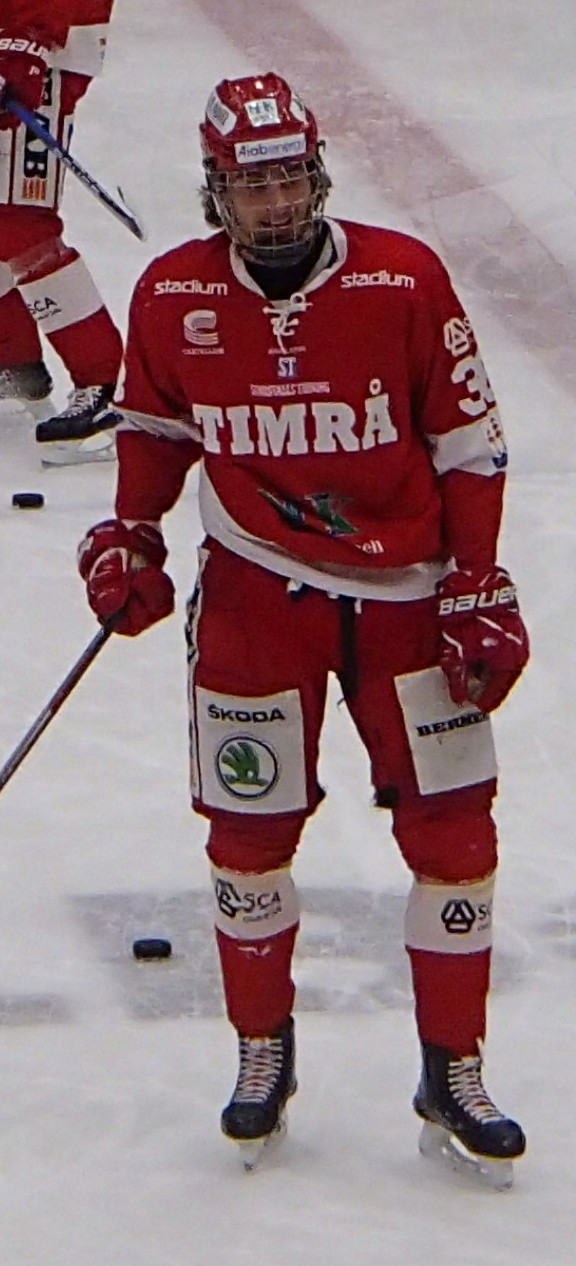
- Born: 8 February 2000 (age 26) Piteå, Sweden
- Height: 6 ft 2 in (188 cm)
- Weight: 192 lb (87 kg; 13 st 10 lb)
- Position: Centre
- Shoots: Left
- Allsv team Former teams: IF Björklöven; Timrå IK; Skellefteå AIK; Frölunda HC
- NHL draft: 56th overall, 2018; Montreal Canadiens
- Playing career: 2016–present

Jacob Olofsson (born 8 February 2000) is a Swedish ice hockey centre currently playing for IF Björklöven of the HockeyAllsvenskan (Allsv). He was selected in the second round, 56th overall, by the Montreal Canadiens in the 2018 NHL entry draft.

== Playing career ==
Olofsson was awarded the Guldgallret, which recognizes the best junior player in the HockeyAllsvenskan, during the 2017–18 season after helping Timrå IK get promoted to the SHL.

Following the 2018–19 season, unable to prevent Timrå IK from being relegated after a lone season in the SHL, Olofsson in order to continue his development was signed to remain in the top flight SHL, agreeing to a two-year contract with Skellefteå AIK on April 15, 2019.

During the 2021–22 season, after a loan stint with Frölunda HC, Olofsson returned to Timrå IK before opting to leave the club on a permanent basis in joining Allsvenskan club, IF Björklöven, on 31 December 2021.

== Career statistics ==
=== Regular season and playoffs ===
			Regular season					Playoffs
Season	Team	League	GP	G	A	Pts	PIM	GP	G	A	Pts	PIM
2015–16	Timrå IK	J20	6	1	5	6	0	—	—	—	—	—
2016–17	Timrå IK	J20	29	4	12	16	10	4	0	0	0	0
2016–17	Timrå IK	Allsv	14	0	0	0	0	4	0	0	0	0
2017–18	Timrå IK	Allsv	43	10	11	21	10	10	3	1	4	6
2018–19	Timrå IK	SHL	34	3	6	9	2	—	—	—	—	—
2019–20	Skellefteå AIK	SHL	24	2	7	9	6	—	—	—	—	—
2020–21	Skellefteå AIK	SHL	16	1	1	2	2	—	—	—	—	—
2020–21	Timrå IK	Allsv	36	9	11	20	16	15	2	1	3	0
2021–22	Timrå IK	SHL	18	1	4	5	0	—	—	—	—	—
2021–22	Frölunda HC	SHL	7	0	1	1	0	—	—	—	—	—
2021–22	IF Björklöven	Allsv	20	5	9	14	2	18	7	6	13	6
2022–23	IF Björklöven	Allsv	20	8	4	12	6	11	2	5	7	2
2023–24	IF Björklöven	Allsv	49	4	11	15	0	5	0	0	0	0
2024–25	IF Björklöven	Allsv	40	8	17	25	18	7	3	1	4	0
SHL totals			99	7	19	26	10	—	—	—	—	—

Medal record

Representing Sweden

Ice hockey

IIHF World U18 Championship
Bronze medal – third place	2018 Russia	

=== International ===
Year	Team	Event	Result	GP	G	A	Pts	PIM
2016	Sweden	U17	1st place, gold medalist(s)	6	1	1	2	0
2017	Sweden	U18	4th	7	3	0	3	0
2017	Sweden	IH18	3rd place, bronze medalist(s)	5	2	2	4	4
2018	Sweden	U18	3rd place, bronze medalist(s)	7	0	3	3	4
2019	Sweden	WJC	5th	5	0	0	0	0
Junior totals				30	6	6	12	8
