= Oliver Wahlstrom =

American ice hockey player (born 2000)

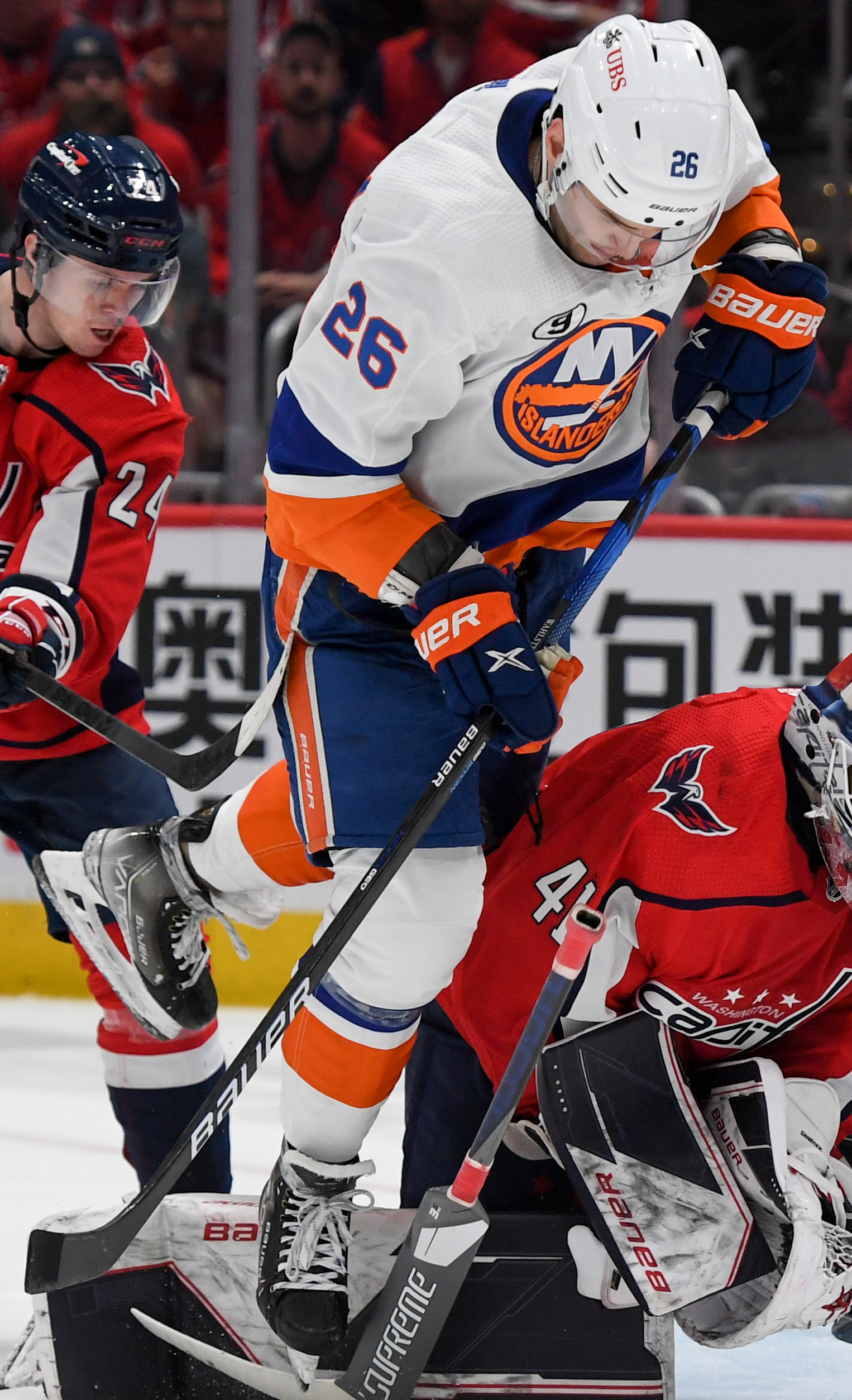
- Wahlstrom with the New York Islanders in 2022, attempting to score on Vítek Vaněček of the Washington Capitals
- Born: June 13, 2000 (age 26) Yarmouth, Maine, U.S.
- Height: 6 ft 2 in (188 cm)
- Weight: 205 lb (93 kg; 14 st 9 lb)
- Position: Winger
- Shoots: Right
- SHL team Former teams: Djurgårdens IF; New York Islanders; Boston Bruins
- NHL draft: 11th overall, 2018; New York Islanders
- Playing career: 2019–present

Oliver Joakim Wahlstrom (born June 13, 2000) is an American professional ice hockey player who is a winger for Djurgårdens IF of the Swedish Hockey League (SHL). He was selected by the New York Islanders, 11th overall, in the 2018 NHL entry draft.

== Playing career ==
Wahlstrom played for the USA Hockey National Team Development Program in the 2016–17 and 2017–18 seasons, where he served as an alternate captain for the under-18 team in his final season. He originally committed to play for the University of Maine when he was just 13 years old, becoming the first player born in the 2000s to commit to play college ice hockey, as well as the youngest player ever to commit to play college ice hockey, before switching his commitment to Harvard University for the 2018–19 season, and finally to Boston College.

In the 2018–19 season, Wahlstrom recorded 8 goals and 11 assists for 19 points as a freshman in 36 games. At the conclusion of the Eagles' season, Wahlstrom concluded his collegiate career by agreeing to a three-year, entry-level contract with the New York Islanders on March 28, 2019.

Wahlstrom made his NHL debut on October 14, 2019, against the St. Louis Blues.

On August 31, 2020, Wahlstrom was loaned by the Islanders to AIK of the Swedish HockeyAllsvenskan to start the 2020–21 season. He returned from his loan spell on December 14.

Wahlstrom scored his first NHL goal on January 28, 2021, in the Islanders' 6–3 loss to the Washington Capitals. His first multi-point game occurred on February 28, 2021, with a goal and an assist in a 2–0 win against the Pittsburgh Penguins.

Wahlstrom's first NHL playoff goal came on May 22, 2021, on the power play, at Nassau Coliseum in a 4–1 win against the Penguins.

On July 25, 2024, Wahlstrom signed a one-year contract extension with the Islanders to avoid salary arbitration. In his sixth season in New York in 2024–25, Wahlstrom registered just 2 goals and 4 points through 27 appearances before he was placed on waivers by the Islanders. On December 14, 2024, Wahlstrom was claimed off waivers by the Boston Bruins. Wahlstrom made 16 appearances with the Bruins, posting 2 points, before he was reassigned and played out the remainder of his contract in the AHL with affiliate, the Providence Bruins.

As a free agent from the Bruins, Wahlstrom remained un-signed over the summer until he was signed to a one-year AHL contract with the San Jose Barracuda, affiliate to the San Jose Sharks, for the 2025–26 season on September 16, 2025.

On September 15, 2026, Wahlstrom signed a one-year contract with Djurgårdens IF of the Swedish Hockey League (SHL).

== Personal life ==
Wahlstrom grew up in Cumberland, Maine. He is a dual citizen of the United States and Sweden through his father, Joakim Wahlstrom. His father played at the University of Maine before playing professionally in Sweden. His mother, Penny Wahlstrom, also an athlete, lives in Maine. He has one sister, Alexandra, who was born in Sweden. Wahlstrom scored a highlight goal at age nine during a shootout contest before a Boston Bruins game in 2009.

== Career statistics ==
=== Regular season and playoffs ===
			Regular season					Playoffs
Season	Team	League	GP	G	A	Pts	PIM	GP	G	A	Pts	PIM
2016–17	U.S. National Development Team	USHL	29	9	4	13	14	—	—	—	—	—
2017–18	U.S. National Development Team	USHL	26	22	23	45	22	—	—	—	—	—
2018–19	Boston College	HE	36	8	11	19	28	—	—	—	—	—
2018–19	Bridgeport Sound Tigers	AHL	5	2	1	3	9	5	2	2	4	4
2019–20	Bridgeport Sound Tigers	AHL	45	10	12	22	29	—	—	—	—	—
2019–20	New York Islanders	NHL	9	0	0	0	4	—	—	—	—	—
2020–21	AIK	Allsv	10	4	4	8	8	—	—	—	—	—
2020–21	New York Islanders	NHL	44	12	9	21	21	5	1	2	3	8
2021–22	New York Islanders	NHL	73	13	11	24	74	—	—	—	—	—
2022–23	New York Islanders	NHL	35	7	9	16	32	—	—	—	—	—
2023–24	New York Islanders	NHL	32	2	4	6	8	—	—	—	—	—
2024–25	New York Islanders	NHL	27	2	2	4	9	—	—	—	—	—
2024–25	Boston Bruins	NHL	16	1	1	2	28	—	—	—	—	—
2024–25	Providence Bruins	AHL	19	9	6	15	10	7	3	1	4	3
2025–26	San Jose Barracuda	AHL	62	24	18	42	45	2	0	3	3	0
NHL totals			236	37	36	73	176	5	1	2	3	8

=== International ===
Medal record

Men's ice hockey

Representing United States

World Junior Championships
Silver medal – second place	2019 Canada	

World U18 Championships
Gold medal – first place	2017 Slovakia	
Silver medal – second place	2018 Russia	

Year	Team	Event	Result	GP	G	A	Pts	PIM
2016	United States	U17	5th	5	0	1	1	4
2017	United States	U18	1st place, gold medalist(s)	7	4	1	5	16
2018	United States	U18	2nd place, silver medalist(s)	7	7	2	9	4
2019	United States	WJC	2nd place, silver medalist(s)	7	2	2	4	2
2020	United States	WJC	6th	5	1	4	5	31
Junior totals				31	14	10	24	57

Awards and achievements
Preceded by Kieffer Bellows	New York Islanders first round pick 2018	Succeeded by Noah Dobson
