= Serron Noel =

Canadian ice hockey player

- Born: August 8, 2000 (age 25) Ottawa, Ontario, Canada
- Height: 6 ft 5 in (196 cm)
- Weight: 216 lb (98 kg; 15 st 6 lb)
- Position: Right wing
- Shoots: Right
- Played for: Syracuse Crunch; Charlotte Checkers
- NHL draft: 34th overall, 2018; Florida Panthers
- Playing career: 2021–present

Serron Noel (born August 8, 2000) is a Canadian professional ice hockey right winger, currently a free agent. He was selected 34th overall in the 2018 NHL entry draft by the Florida Panthers.

== Playing career ==
=== Junior ===
==== Oshawa Generals ====
Noel was drafted by the Oshawa Generals in the second round, 25th overall, at the 2016 OHL Priority Selection.

Noel skated in his first career OHL game on September 23, 2016, as he was held without a point in a 4–3 loss to the Sudbury Wolves. On October 9, Noel scored his first career OHL goal and point, as he scored the opening goal for the Generals against David Ovsjannikov of the Barrie Colts in a 4–2 victory. Less than two weeks later, Noel earned the first multi-point game of his career, as he collected a goal and an assist in a 6–2 win over the Sarnia Sting on October 21. In his rookie season with the Generals in 2016–17, Noel scored eight goals and 21 points in 63 games. On March 24, 2017, Noel appeared in his first career OHL playoff game, as he scored a goal against Jake McGrath of the Sudbury Wolves in a 5–2 loss. During the post-season, Noel played in nine games, scoring a goal and three points.

In 2017–18, Noel saw a dramatic increase in his offensive production. On September 23, 2017, Noel scored the first hat trick of his OHL career, as he scored three goals in a 7–4 win over the Sault Ste. Marie Greyhounds. Noel had back-to-back three-point games in late November, as on November 24, he scored two goals and added an assist in a 6–5 loss to the Hamilton Bulldogs. The next day, Noel scored a goal and added two assists in a 7–3 win over the Barrie Colts. Overall, Noel scored 28 goals and 53 points in 62 games, finishing second on the team in goals, and fifth in points. In the post-season, Noel had an assist in five games.

Noel returned to the Generals for the 2018–19 season. On September 27, Noel scored the second hat trick of his OHL career, as he earned three goals in a 7–2 win over the North Bay Battalion. On November 15, Noel set a new career high for points in a game, as he scored two goals and added two assists in a 5–2 victory against the Windsor Spitfires. Just over a month later, on December 28, Noel had his second career four-point game, as he scored a goal and earned three assists in a 6–2 win over the Mississauga Steelheads. Noel finished the season as the top scorer on the team, as he scored 34 goals and 81 points in 68 games. On April 9, Noel scored the first multi-goal game of his OHL playoff career, as he scored two goals in a 4–1 win over the Niagara IceDogs. In 14 post-season games, Noel scored four goals and added seven assists for 11 points, tying for the third highest point total on the team.

Noel began the 2019–20 with the Generals after being reassigned by his NHL club, the Florida Panthers. On November 10, Noel earned his third career OHL hat trick, while adding an assist to match his career high for points in a game with four, as the Generals defeated the Kitchener Rangers 4–2. On January 8, 2020, Noel was traded to the Kitchener Rangers for Ryan Stepien and four draft picks. At the time of the trade, Noel scored 13 goals and 29 points in 28 games for Oshawa.

==== Kitchener Rangers ====
Noel was acquired by the Kitchener Rangers on January 8, 2020. Noel appeared in his first game with the Rangers two nights later, on January 10, as he was held without a point in a 5–2 win over the Niagara IceDogs. On January 17, Noel earned his first point as a member of the Rangers, an assist, in a 9–2 win over the North Bay Battalion. One week later, on January 24, Noel scored his first goal with his new club, against Ethan Langevin of the Sarnia Sting, in a 7–4 win. On February 28, Noel recorded four assists in a 7–3 win over the Sarnia Sting. In 20 games with Kitchener, Noel scored five goals and 18 points.

=== Professional ===
==== Florida Panthers ====
Noel was drafted by the Florida Panthers in the second round, 34th overall, at the 2018 NHL entry draft held at the American Airlines Centerin Dallas, Texas on June 23, 2018. Noel was ranked the 10th-best North American skater by NHL Central Scouting and the 14th-best prospect overall by ISS Hockey prior to the draft.

On March 8, 2019, Noel was signed by the Panthers to a three-year, entry-level contract.

== International play ==
Noel was part of the gold medal-winning Canadian U18 team in the 2017 Ivan Hlinka Memorial Tournament. He again represented Canada in the 2018 U18 World Championships, totaling two goals and four assists in five games.

== Personal life ==
Noel's father, Dean, was a running back who played five seasons in the Canadian Football League with the Ottawa Rough Riders and the Hamilton Tiger-Cats.

== Career statistics ==
=== Regular season and playoffs ===
| | | | Regular season | | | | | Playoffs |
| Season | Team | League | GP | G | A | Pts | PIM | GP | G | A | Pts | PIM |
|---|---|---|---|---|---|---|---|---|---|---|---|---|
| 2016–17 | Oshawa Generals | OHL | 63 | 8 | 13 | 21 | 52 | 9 | 1 | 2 | 3 | 9 |
| 2017–18 | Oshawa Generals | OHL | 62 | 28 | 25 | 53 | 61 | 5 | 0 | 1 | 1 | 12 |
| 2018–19 | Oshawa Generals | OHL | 68 | 34 | 47 | 81 | 54 | 14 | 4 | 7 | 11 | 18 |
| 2019–20 | Oshawa Generals | OHL | 28 | 13 | 16 | 29 | 16 | — | — | — | — | — |
| 2019–20 | Kitchener Rangers | OHL | 20 | 5 | 13 | 18 | 20 | — | — | — | — | — |
| 2020–21 | Syracuse Crunch | AHL | 8 | 1 | 3 | 4 | 13 | — | — | — | — | — |
| 2021–22 | Charlotte Checkers | AHL | 64 | 5 | 15 | 20 | 74 | 5 | 1 | 0 | 1 | 2 |
| 2022–23 | Florida Everblades | ECHL | 7 | 0 | 1 | 1 | 19 | — | — | — | — | — |
| 2023–24 | Arnprior Rivermen | EOSHL | 1 | 0 | 0 | 0 | 4 | — | — | — | — | — |
| 2023–24 | Newfoundland Growlers | ECHL | 12 | 2 | 0 | 2 | 51 | — | — | — | — | — |
| AHL totals | | | 72 | 6 | 18 | 24 | 87 | 5 | 1 | 0 | 1 | 2 |

=== International ===
| Year | Team | Event | Result | GP | G | A | Pts | PIM |
|---|---|---|---|---|---|---|---|---|
| 2016 | Canada Red | U17 | 6th | 5 | 1 | 3 | 4 | 15 |
| 2017 | Canada | IH18 | 1st place, gold medalist(s) | 5 | 1 | 0 | 1 | 2 |
| 2018 | Canada | U18 | 5th | 5 | 2 | 4 | 6 | 8 |
| Junior totals | | | | 15 | 4 | 7 | 11 | 25 |
