= Spencer Stastney =

American ice hockey player (born 2000)

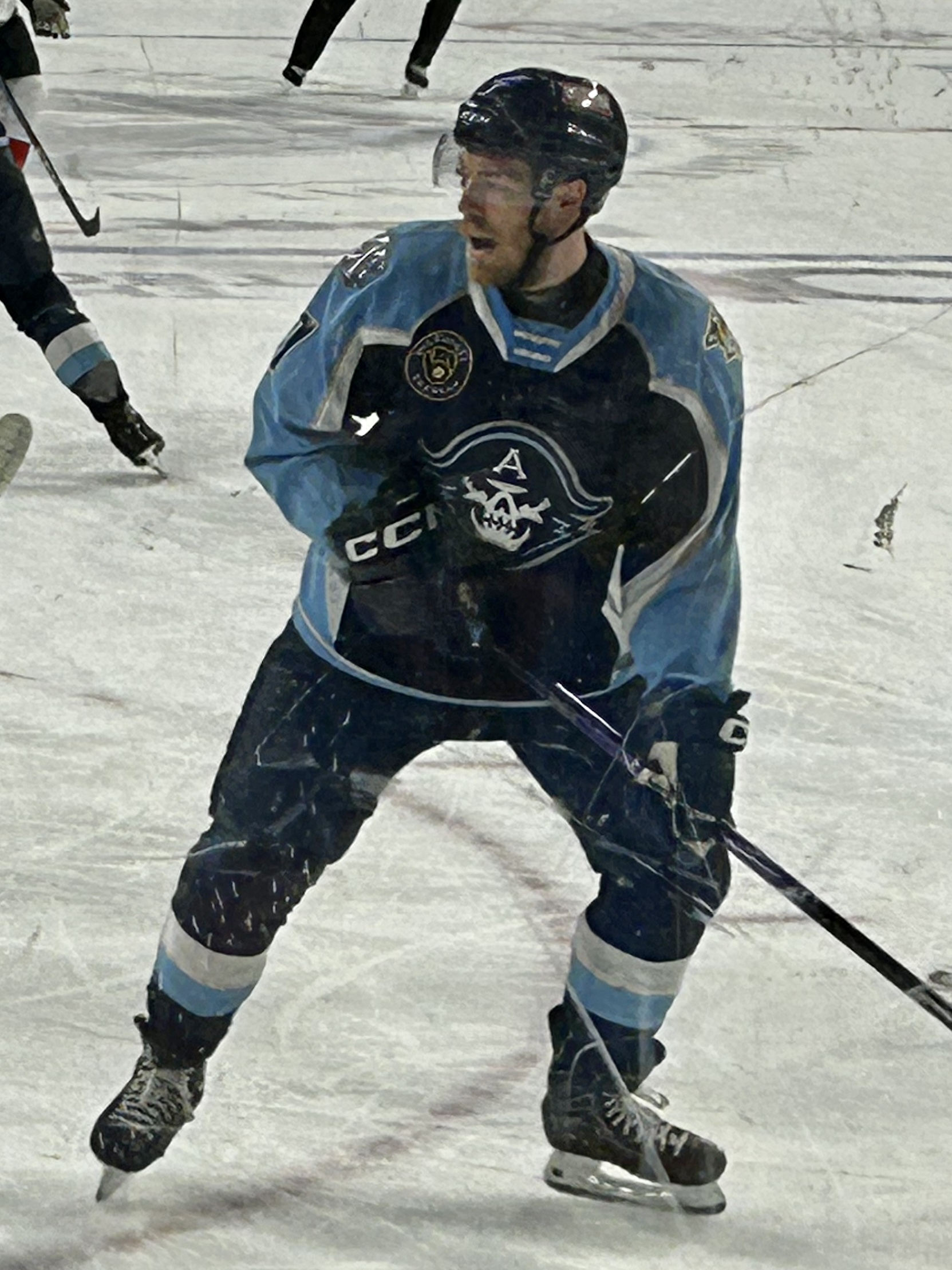
- Stastney playing for the Milwaukee Admirals in June 2024
- Born: January 4, 2000 (age 26) Mequon, Wisconsin, U.S.
- Height: 5 ft 11 in (180 cm)
- Weight: 196 lb (89 kg; 14 st 0 lb)
- Position: Defense
- Shoots: Left
- NHL team Former teams: Pittsburgh Penguins; Nashville Predators; Edmonton Oilers
- NHL draft: 131st overall, 2018; Nashville Predators
- Playing career: 2022–present

Spencer Charles Stastney (born January 4, 2000) is an American professional ice hockey player who is a defenseman for the Pittsburgh Penguins of the National Hockey League (NHL). He played college ice hockey at Notre Dame.

== Early life ==
Stastney was born in Mequon, Wisconsin. He attended elementary school and middle school in Mequon, before moving to Woodridge, Illinois where he attended Bridgedale Academy. He also played youth hockey for the Chicago Mission of the Tier 1 Elite Hockey League.

== Playing career ==
=== College ===
During the 2018–19 season, his freshman year, Stastney recorded one goal and three assists in 39 games for Notre Dame. He led the Chicago Blackhawks onto the ice for the 2019 NHL Winter Classic. He scored his first collegiate goal during the championship game of the 2019 Big Ten men's ice hockey tournament. He was subsequently named to the Big Ten All-Tournament team. During the 2019–20 season, his sophomore year, he recorded three goals and 17 assists in 36 games.

During the 2020–21 season, his junior year, he recorded five goals and seven assists in 29 games. His five goals were tied with Nick Leivermann and Michigan's Nick Blankenburg for the most by a Big Ten defenseman. Following the season, he was named to the All-Big Ten Second Team. During the 2021–22 season, his senior year, he recorded a career-high seven goals and 20 assists in 39 games. He ranked second on the team in scoring with 27 points. He also ranked second in the conference with 69 blocked shots. Following the season he was named the team's Monogram Club MVP. He finished his career at Notre Dame with 16 goals and 47 assists in 143 games.

=== Professional ===
Stastney was drafted in the fifth round, 131st overall, by the Nashville Predators in the 2018 NHL entry draft.

On March 31, 2022, Stastney signed a two-year, entry-level contract with the Nashville Predators. During his rookie season, he recorded five goals and eight assists in 56 games for the Milwaukee Admirals of the American Hockey League (AHL). He made his NHL debut for the Predators on April 1, 2023. During the 2022–23 season, he recorded two points in eight games. Following the regular season, he was returned to the Admirals for the 2023 Calder Cup playoffs. During the playoffs, he recorded one goal and five assists in 16 games. During game five of the division semifinals, he scored the game-winning goal with 27 seconds remaining in the game to help the Admirals advance to the Western Conference finals.

On November 14, 2023, Stastney was recalled by the Predators. Prior to being recalled, he recorded one goal and three assists in 10 games for the Milwaukee Admirals. During the 2023–24 season he recorded two goals and two assists in 20 regular season games and was scoreless in three games during the 2024 Stanley Cup playoffs. On July 25, 2024, he signed a two-year, $1.6 million contract extension with the Predators.

On December 12, 2025, the Predators traded Stastney to the Edmonton Oilers in exchange for a 2027 third-round pick.

Stastney signed a one-year contract extension with the Oilers worth $1.525 million on July 5, 2026.

On October 7, 2026, the Oilers traded Stastney to the Pittsburgh Penguins in exchange for forward Filip Hållander.

== International play ==
Medal record

Men's ice hockey

Representing the United States

World U18 Championship
Silver medal – second place	2018 Russia	

Stastney represented the United States under-18 team at the 2018 World U18 Championships where he recorded one goal and four assists in seven games and won a silver medal. He represented the United States junior team at the 2020 World Junior Championships, where he was scoreless in five games.

== Career statistics ==
=== Regular season and playoffs ===
			Regular season					Playoffs
Season	Team	League	GP	G	A	Pts	PIM	GP	G	A	Pts	PIM
2016–17	U.S. National Development Team	USHL	34	1	4	5	6	—	—	—	—	—
2017–18	U.S. National Development Team	USHL	23	1	14	15	6	—	—	—	—	—
2018–19	University of Notre Dame	B1G	39	1	3	4	8	—	—	—	—	—
2019–20	University of Notre Dame	B1G	36	3	17	20	17	—	—	—	—	—
2020–21	University of Notre Dame	B1G	29	5	7	12	6	—	—	—	—	—
2021–22	University of Notre Dame	B1G	39	7	20	27	8	—	—	—	—	—
2021–22	Milwaukee Admirals	AHL	2	0	0	0	0	—	—	—	—	—
2022–23	Milwaukee Admirals	AHL	56	5	8	13	10	16	1	5	6	6
2022–23	Nashville Predators	NHL	8	0	2	2	2	—	—	—	—	—
2023–24	Milwaukee Admirals	AHL	44	5	15	20	2	10	0	0	0	4
2023–24	Nashville Predators	NHL	20	2	2	4	4	3	0	0	0	0
2024–25	Milwaukee Admirals	AHL	26	3	14	17	4	10	2	2	4	4
2024–25	Nashville Predators	NHL	23	0	3	3	4	—	—	—	—	—
2025–26	Nashville Predators	NHL	30	1	8	9	10	—	—	—	—	—
2025–26	Edmonton Oilers	NHL	36	1	0	1	10	—	—	—	—	—
NHL totals			117	4	15	19	30	3	0	0	0	0

=== International ===
Year	Team	Event	Result	GP	G	A	Pts	PIM
2017	United States	U17	1st place, gold medalist(s)	5	0	2	2	0
2018	United States	U18	2nd place, silver medalist(s)	7	1	4	5	2
2020	United States	WJC	6th	5	0	0	0	8
Junior totals				17	1	6	7	10
