= Ty Dellandrea =

Canadian ice hockey player (born 2000)

- Dellandrea with the San Jose Sharks in 2026
- Born: July 21, 2000 (age 26) Port Perry, Ontario, Canada
- Height: 6 ft 2 in (188 cm)
- Weight: 190 lb (86 kg; 13 st 8 lb)
- Position: Forward
- Shoots: Right
- NHL team Former teams: San Jose Sharks; JYP Jyväskylä; Dallas Stars
- NHL draft: 13th overall, 2018; Dallas Stars
- Playing career: 2019–present

Ty Dellandrea (born July 21, 2000) is a Canadian professional ice hockey player who is a forward for the San Jose Sharks of the National Hockey League (NHL). Dellandrea was selected in the first round, 13th overall, by the Dallas Stars in the 2018 NHL entry draft.

== Early life ==
Dellandrea, and his parents Loni and Jay Dellandrea, moved to Port Perry, Ontario when he was 7-years-old and joined the Central Ontario Wolves in an effort to make new friends.

== Playing career ==
=== Junior ===
==== Flint Firebirds ====
Dellandrea was drafted in the first round, fifth overall, by the Flint Firebirds in the 2016 OHL Priority Selection. While with the team he chose to wear number 53 in honor of his cousin who had passed in 2004.

He appeared in his first career OHL game on September 21, 2016, scoring a goal against Brendan Bonello of the Saginaw Spirit 63 seconds into the game, as the Firebirds defeated the Spirit 4–0. He began his OHL career with points in each of his first five games. On October 15, Dellandrea scored his first career OHL multi-goal game, as he had two goals and an assist in a 5–3 loss to the Barrie Colts. Dellandrea finished the 2016–17 season with 13 goals and 24 points in 57 games. On March 23, Dellandrea suited up for his first career post-season game in a 5–2 loss to the Sault Ste. Marie Greyhounds. Six days later, Dellandrea earned his first career OHL playoff point, assisting on a goal scored by Kole Sherwood in a 5–2 loss to the Sault Ste. Marie Greyhounds, which would be his only point of the five playoff games he played in the season.

Dellandrea saw improvement to his offensive numbers during the 2017–18 OHL season. In his first game of the season on September 22, Dellandrea scored two goals in a 5–3 win over the Kitchener Rangers. On November 15, he recorded his second career three-point game, as Dellandrea recorded three assists in a 5–3 win over the Saginaw Spirit. Dellandrea recorded his first career OHL hat-trick on December 16, as he scored three goals, as well as added two assists for a five-point game, in a 5–2 win over the Sarnia Sting. From January 26 until February 2, Dellandrea recorded four consecutive two-point games. Dellandrea finished the season with 27 goals and 59 points in 62 games. Following the season, Dellandrea was named the Firebirds MVP and awarded the Combined Academic & Athletics Excellence award, having earned a 4.0 grade point average while attending Grand Blanc High School.

Dellandrea returned to the Firebirds for the 2018–19 OHL season and he was named captain of the team. On January 6, Dellandrea set a career high when he recorded four assists in a 6–4 win over the Sault Ste. Marie Greyhounds. Less than a week later, on January 12, Dellandrea tied his career high for points in a game, as he scored a goal and four assists for five points, in a 6–2 victory over the Sarnia Sting. Dellandrea finished the season with 22 goals and 63 points in 60 games.

In 2019–20 OHL season, Dellandrea returned to Flint for a fourth season, remaining the captain of the team. On November 20, Dellandrea recorded the second hat-trick of his OHL career, as he scored three goals in a 6–4 loss to the Sarnia Sting. Just over two weeks later, on December 5, Dellandrea recorded another hat-trick, as he scored three goals, as well as an assist, in a 5–2 win over the Barrie Colts. On January 19, Dellandrea tied his career-high for points in a game, as he scored two goals and added three assists for five points, in an 8–5 win over the Kingston Frontenacs. This game started a five-game streak in which Dellandrea scored 10 goals and 18 points. Dellandrea finished the season with a career-high 32 goals and 70 points in 48 games.

=== Professional ===
==== Dallas Stars ====
Dellandrea became the first Firebird to be selected in first round of the NHL entry draft when he was selected 13th overall by the Dallas Stars in 2018. He then participated at the Stars Development camp, and signed a three-year, entry-level contract with the Stars on September 19, 2018.

On March 19, 2019, following the end of his junior season with the Flint Firebirds, the Stars assigned Dellandrea to their American Hockey League (AHL) affiliate, the Texas Stars. The following day, on March 20, Dellandrea appeared in his first professional hockey game, in a 6–3 victory over the Grand Rapids Griffins. On April 5, Dellandrea scored his first career professional goal, as he scored the game-winning goal on a penalty shot against Collin Delia of the Rockford IceHogs in a 2–1 win. Dellandrea also assisted on the first goal of the game to earn his first career multi-point game in the AHL. In 11 games with Texas, Dellandrea scored two goals and three points.

Dellandrea made his NHL debut during the shortened 2020–21 NHL season where he played 26 games, recording three goals and two assists, for a total of five points in his first season. Called up to the NHL for only one game in the regular season in 2021–22 and one game in the postseason 2022 Stanley Cup playoffs, Dellandrea made the opening night roster for the 2022–23 NHL season, playing on the second line alongside Tyler Seguin and Mason Marchment.

==== San Jose Sharks ====
After seven years with the Stars organization, Dellandrea was traded to the San Jose Sharks on June 19, 2024, in exchange for a 4th-round pick in 2025. In July 2024, he signed a two-year contract with the Sharks. In March 2026, he signed a two-year contract extension. In the 2025-26 season Dellandrea had two goals and nine assists in 42 games, and prior to a lower body injury in January 2026 had won 52.3% of his faceoffs.

== International play ==
Medal record

Representing Canada

Ice hockey

World Junior Championships
Gold medal – first place	2020 Czech Republic	

On April 19, 2018, Dellandrea was named an assistant captain for Team Canada at the 2018 IIHF World U18 Championships. Team Canada placed fifth in the tournament and Dellandrea ended with two goals and five points.

Dellandrea played for Team Canada at the 2020 World Junior Ice Hockey Championships, as he scored three goals and five points in seven games, helping Canada win the gold medal.

== Career statistics ==
=== Regular season and playoffs ===
			Regular season					Playoffs
Season	Team	League	GP	G	A	Pts	PIM	GP	G	A	Pts	PIM
2014–15	Central Ontario Wolves	ETA	33	18	17	35	38	—	—	—	—	—
2015–16	Central Ontario Wolves	ETA	36	36	21	57	52	—	—	—	—	—
2016–17	Flint Firebirds	OHL	57	13	11	24	26	5	0	1	1	0
2017–18	Flint Firebirds	OHL	67	27	32	59	48	—	—	—	—	—
2018–19	Flint Firebirds	OHL	60	22	41	63	51	—	—	—	—	—
2018–19	Texas Stars	AHL	11	2	1	3	4	—	—	—	—	—
2019–20	Flint Firebirds	OHL	47	32	38	70	33	—	—	—	—	—
2020–21	JYP Jyväskylä	Liiga	6	2	1	3	2	—	—	—	—	—
2020–21	Dallas Stars	NHL	26	3	2	5	23	—	—	—	—	—
2020–21	Texas Stars	AHL	8	2	4	6	2	—	—	—	—	—
2021–22	Texas Stars	AHL	68	23	27	50	43	2	0	0	0	0
2021–22	Dallas Stars	NHL	1	0	0	0	0	1	0	0	0	0
2022–23	Dallas Stars	NHL	82	9	19	28	54	15	3	0	3	22
2023–24	Dallas Stars	NHL	42	2	7	9	23	6	1	0	1	2
2024–25	San Jose Sharks	NHL	68	1	7	8	59	—	—	—	—	—
2025–26	San Jose Sharks	NHL	46	2	9	11	22	—	—	—	—	—
Liiga totals			6	2	1	3	2	—	—	—	—	—
NHL totals			265	17	44	61	181	22	4	0	4	24

=== International ===
Year	Team	Event	Result	GP	G	A	Pts	PIM
2016	Canada Red	U17	6th	5	1	1	2	2
2017	Canada	U18	5th	5	0	0	0	0
2017	Canada	IH18	1st place, gold medalist(s)	5	0	0	0	4
2018	Canada	U18	5th	5	2	3	5	4
2020	Canada	WJC	1st place, gold medalist(s)	7	3	2	5	6
Junior totals				27	6	6	12	16

Awards and achievements
Preceded by Jake Oettinger	Dallas Stars first-round draft pick 2018	Succeeded by Thomas Harley
