= Libor Zábranský (ice hockey, born 2000) =

Czech ice hockey player

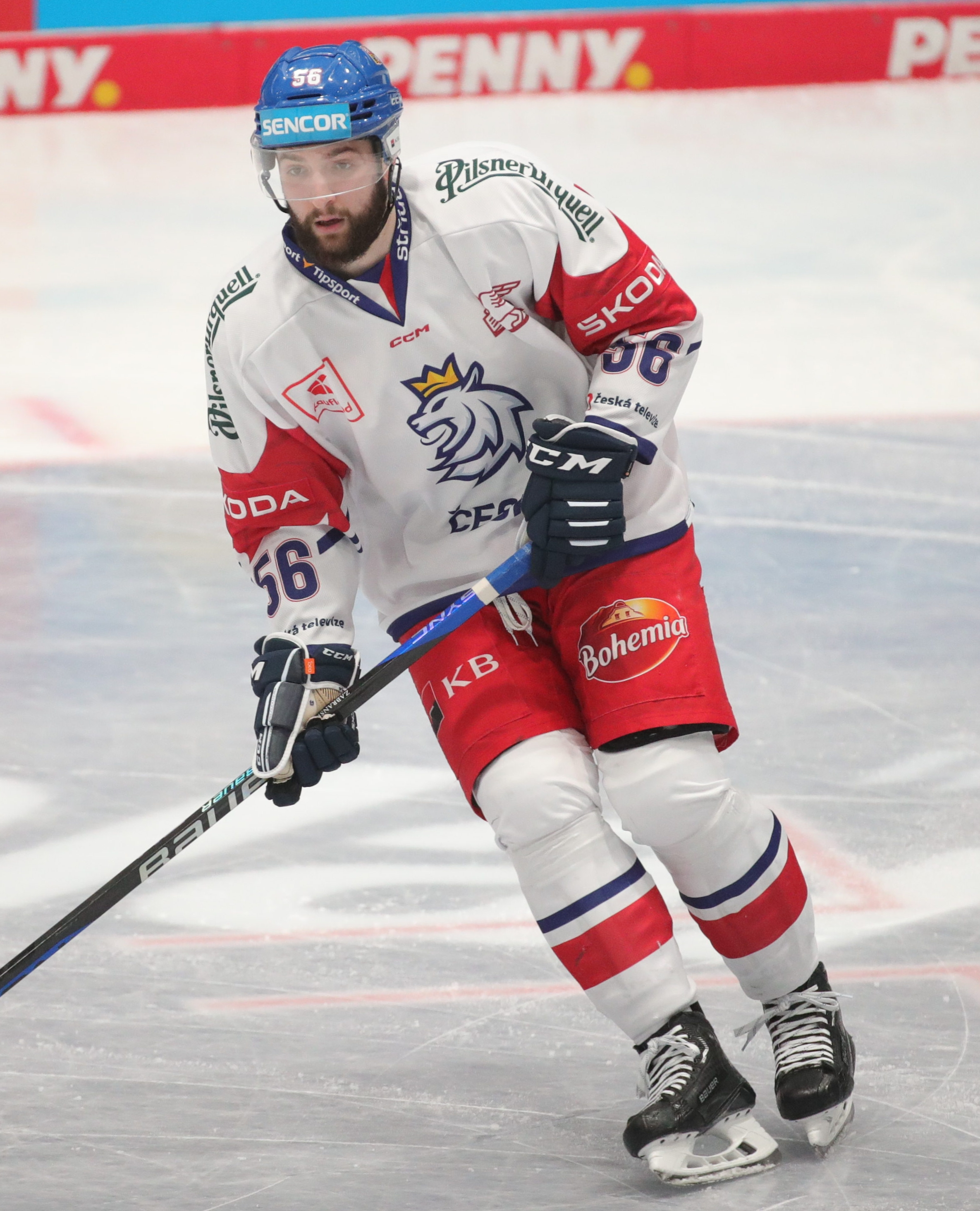
- Zábranský with the Czech Republic in 2023
- Born: 26 May 2000 (age 25) Brno, Czech Republic
- Height: 6 ft 1 in (185 cm)
- Weight: 190 lb (86 kg; 13 st 8 lb)
- Position: Defenceman
- Shoots: Right
- Liiga team Former teams: Porin Ässät; Kometa Brno; Mikkelin Jukurit
- National team: Czech Republic
- Playing career: 2016–present

Libor Zábranský Jr. (born 26 May 2000) is a Czech ice hockey defenceman currently playing for Porin Ässät of the Liiga. He is the son of the Czech former professional ice hockey defenceman Libor Zábranský Sr.

== Playing career ==
In August 2017, he was the captain of men's national under-18 team in the Ivan Hlinka Memorial Tournament. The national team got into the finals where they lost to Canada 4–1. Zábranský himself, however, could not play the final match due to injury.

In April 2018, he was the captain of the same team in the World U18 Championships. In the preliminary round, the team defeated only France finishing in 4th place. However, in the quarterfinals, the team created major upset defeating Canada 2–1.

He was also appointed captain of the men's national under-20 team for the 2020 World Junior Championships.

In the CSB ranking for the 2018 NHL entry draft, he ranked on 115th place in North American Skaters category.

On 17th of April 2023, Ässät announced that Zabransky had signed a one-year contract with them.

== Career statistics ==
=== Regular season and playoffs ===
			Regular season					Playoffs
Season	Team	League	GP	G	A	Pts	PIM	GP	G	A	Pts	PIM
2015–16	HC Kometa Brno U20	CZE Jr	12	3	4	7	4	—	—	—	—	—
2016–17	HC Kometa Brno U20	CZE Jr	34	9	26	35	36	12	3	7	10	6
2016–17	HC Kometa Brno	CZE	15	0	1	1	2	1	0	0	0	0
2016–17	SK Horácká Slavia Třebíč	CZE-2	3	0	0	0	4	—	—	—	—	—
2017–18	Kelowna Rockets	WHL	72	2	17	19	34	4	0	0	0	0
2018–19	Kelowna Rockets	WHL	35	2	7	9	32	—	—	—	—	—
2018–19	Fargo Force	USHL	30	4	12	16	20	2	0	0	0	0
2019–20	Saskatoon Blades	WHL	16	1	4	5	14	—	—	—	—	—
2019–20	Moose Jaw Warriors	WHL	13	1	5	6	15	—	—	—	—	—
2019–20	Kamloops Blazers	WHL	23	2	8	10	12	—	—	—	—	—
2020–21	HC Energie Karlovy Vary	CZE	51	7	14	4	12	4	0	0	0	8
2021–22	Jukurit	FIN	58	4	13	17	57	7	1	0	1	2
2022–23	Jukurit	FIN	57	3	12	15	18	—	—	—	—	—
FIN totals			115	7	25	32	75	7	1	0	1	2

=== International ===
Year	Team	Event	GP	G	A	Pts	PIM
2017	Czech Republic	IH18	4	1	3	4	2
2018	Czech Republic	WJC18	7	1	4	5	6
2020	Czech Republic	WJC	5	4	0	4	16
Junior totals			16	6	7	13	24
