= Joël Vermin =

Swiss ice hockey player (born 1992)

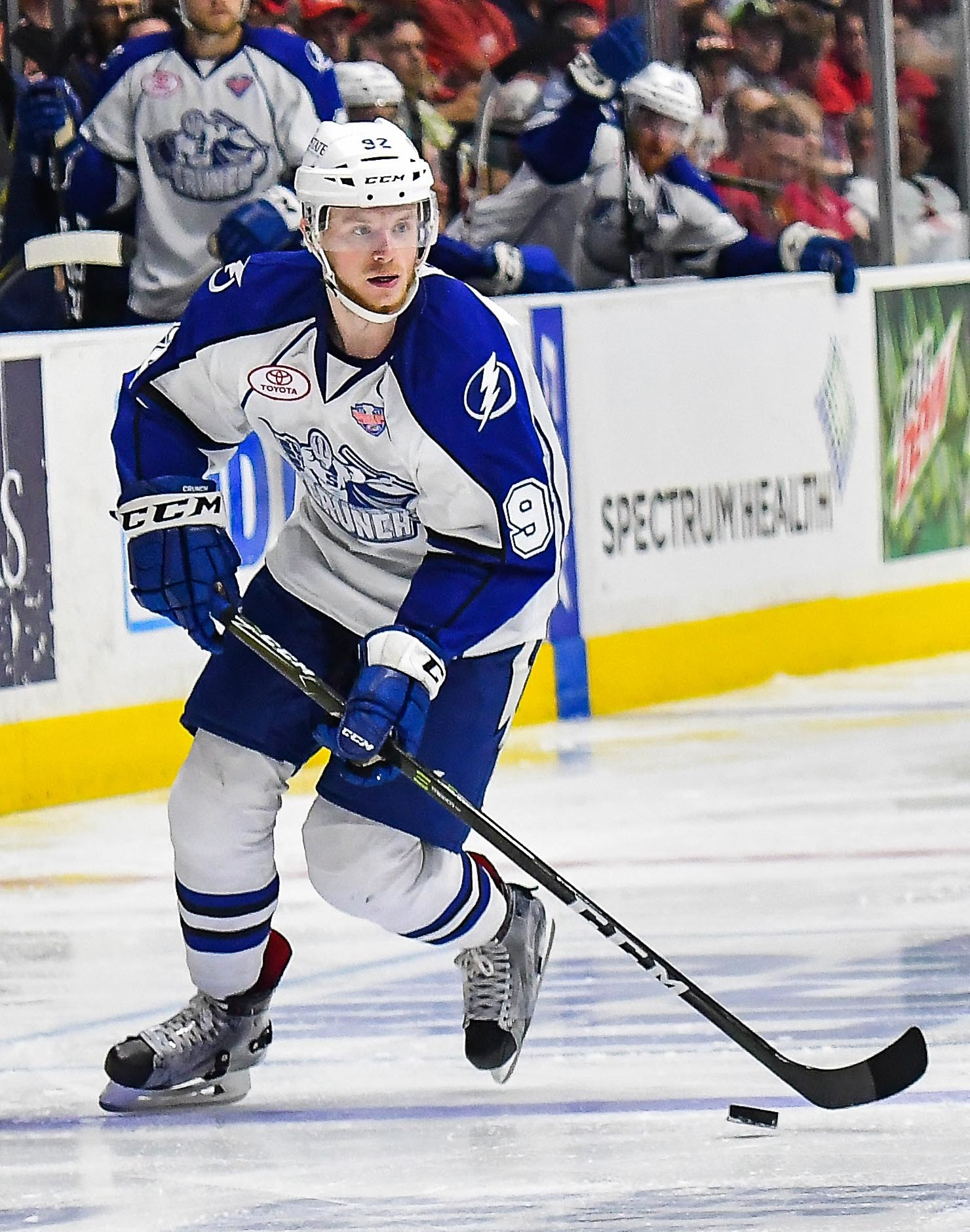
- Vermin with the Syracuse Crunch in 2017
- Born: 5 February 1992 (age 34) Frauenkappelen, Switzerland
- Height: 5 ft 9 in (175 cm)
- Weight: 181 lb (82 kg; 12 st 13 lb)
- Position: Wing
- Shoots: Left
- NL team Former teams: SC Bern; Tampa Bay Lightning; Lausanne HC; Genève-Servette HC
- National team: Switzerland
- NHL draft: 186th overall, 2013; Tampa Bay Lightning
- Playing career: 2009–present

Joël Vermin (born 5 February 1992) is a Swiss professional ice hockey winger who is currently playing for SC Bern of the National League (NL). Vermin was selected by the Tampa Bay Lightning in the 7th round (186th overall) of the 2013 NHL entry draft.

== Playing career ==
=== Juniors ===
Vermin made his National League A debut in Switzerland with SC Bern during the 2009–10 season. On 17 September 2013, Vermin was signed to a three-year, entry-level contract with the Tampa Bay Lightning.

In his first season of professional hockey, Vermin was loaned to SC Bern for the season. In 55 games that season, Vermin recorded 22 points. In his career with Bern, he played in 230 games, registering 41 goals and 64 assists. At the finish of the season, Vermin joined the Syracuse Crunch for the remainder of the AHL season.

=== Professional ===
On 18 November 2015, the Tampa Bay Lightning recalled Vermin from the Syracuse Crunch. Vermin had skated in 12 games with the Crunch that season, posting three goals and ten points. At the time, he was ranked first in both assists (seven) and points. In his career, he has appeared in 93 career AHL games, all with the Syracuse Crunch during the past three seasons. During that time, he recorded 16 goals and 44 points. In 2016, Vermin posted career bests in games played (73), goals (12), assists (21) and points (33). On 19 November 2015, Vermin made his NHL debut in a 2-1 Lightning win over the visiting New York Rangers. On 21 November 2015, Vermin recorded his first NHL point in a 5-0 Lightning win over the Anaheim Ducks. Vermin assisted on a Nikita Kucherov goal in his second NHL game.

On 21 May 2016, the Lightning re-signed Vermin to a one-year, two-way contract. Vermin skated in six games with the Lightning during the 2015-16 regular season, recording one assist and a plus-1 rating. Vermin has also played in 118 career AHL games over three seasons, all with Syracuse, recording 22 goals and 55 points.

On 20 June 2017, Lausanne HC announced that it had signed Vermin to a five-year contract with an NHL out clause for a one-way deal. The deal was previously reported in January.

During the summer of 2020, Vermin caused a major dispute within Lausanne's locker room after reportedly sleeping with a teammate's wife. The team immediately told the media that he would no longer suit up for them and that he would either be traded or sent to the press box. On 18 August 2020, Vermin failed to report to training camp, which began that same day, despite being summoned.

On 14 September 2020, Vermin was eventually traded to Genève-Servette HC in exchange for Petr Čajka and Tim Bozon.

On 5 August 2021, Vermin agreed to a four-year deal to return to original club, SC Bern, starting in the 2022–23 season and through to the 2025–26 season.

== Personal ==
His father is from the Netherlands while his mother is from Hungary. Though Vermin had the option to play hockey internationally for Switzerland, Hungary or the Netherlands, he chose Switzerland because he was born in the country and developed there.

== Career statistics ==
=== Regular season and playoffs ===
			Regular season					Playoffs
Season	Team	League	GP	G	A	Pts	PIM	GP	G	A	Pts	PIM
2007–08	SC Bern	SUI U17	32	24	21	45	22	13	2	8	10	2
2007–08	SC Bern	SUI U20	4	0	0	0	6	—	—	—	—	—
2008–09	SC Bern	SUI U17	28	29	25	54	50	8	7	9	16	12
2008–09	SC Bern	SUI U20	13	3	5	8	2	—	—	—	—	—
2009–10	SC Bern	SUI U20	34	28	27	55	59	7	3	8	11	4
2009–10	SC Bern	NLA	12	0	0	0	0	—	—	—	—	—
2010–11	SC Bern	SUI U20	6	4	6	10	2	—	—	—	—	—
2010–11	SC Bern	NLA	36	1	7	8	6	11	3	3	6	0
2011–12	SC Bern	NLA	33	11	9	20	0	17	2	3	5	2
2012–13	SC Bern	NLA	47	13	22	35	14	19	3	6	9	8
2013–14	SC Bern	NLA	49	6	12	18	16	—	—	—	—	—
2013–14	Syracuse Crunch	AHL	8	1	0	1	0	—	—	—	—	—
2014–15	Syracuse Crunch	AHL	73	12	21	33	16	3	0	1	1	0
2015–16	Syracuse Crunch	AHL	37	9	12	21	6	—	—	—	—	—
2015–16	Tampa Bay Lightning	NHL	6	0	1	1	0	—	—	—	—	—
2016–17	Syracuse Crunch	AHL	46	13	19	32	17	22	9	2	11	8
2016–17	Tampa Bay Lightning	NHL	18	0	3	3	4	—	—	—	—	—
2017–18	Lausanne HC	NL	32	10	15	25	2	—	—	—	—	—
2018–19	Lausanne HC	NL	49	20	15	35	28	12	5	5	10	6
2019–20	Lausanne HC	NL	47	14	12	26	39	—	—	—	—	—
2020–21	Genève–Servette HC	NL	50	9	25	34	34	11	3	5	8	6
2021–22	Genève–Servette HC	NL	52	21	12	33	24	2	0	1	1	0
2022–23	SC Bern	NL	52	6	9	15	12	9	2	1	3	8
2023–24	SC Bern	NL	52	11	15	26	18	7	0	0	0	2
NL totals			511	122	152	274	193	88	18	24	42	32
NHL totals			24	0	4	4	4	—	—	—	—	—

Medal record

Ice hockey

Representing Switzerland

World Championships
Silver medal – second place	2018 Denmark	

World Junior A Challenge
Bronze medal – third place	2010 Penticton	

European Youth Olympics
Silver medal – second place	2009 Silesia	

=== International ===
Year	Team	Event	Result	GP	G	A	Pts	PIM
2010	Switzerland	WJC18	5th	6	3	2	5	0
2011	Switzerland	WJC	5th	6	0	1	1	2
2012	Switzerland	WJC	8th	6	4	1	5	2
2018	Switzerland	WC	2nd place, silver medalist(s)	10	3	3	6	0
2021	Switzerland	WC	6th	6	2	1	3	0
2022	Switzerland	OG	8th	4	0	0	0	4
Junior totals				18	7	4	11	4
Senior totals				20	5	4	9	4
