= Mikko Kokkonen =

Finnish ice hockey player (born 2001)

- Born: 18 January 2001 (age 25) Mikkeli, Finland
- Height: 5 ft 11 in (180 cm)
- Weight: 200 lb (91 kg; 14 st 4 lb)
- Position: Defence
- Shoots: Left
- SHL team Former teams: Linköping HC; Jukurit; Lahti Pelicans
- NHL draft: 84th overall, 2019; Toronto Maple Leafs
- Playing career: 2016–present

Mikko Kokkonen (born 18 January 2001) is a Finnish professional ice hockey defenceman for Linköping HC of the Swedish Hockey League (SHL). He was selected 84th overall by the Toronto Maple Leafs in the 2019 NHL entry draft.

== Playing career ==
Kokkonen played as a youth within hometown club, Mikkelin Jukurit, before becoming the youngest player in history to play in the Liiga during the 2016–17 season. Following his selection by the Toronto Maple Leafs of the National Hockey League (NHL) in the third-round, 84th overall, in the 2019 NHL entry draft, Kokkonen continued his development with Jukurit, appearing in 39 regular season games and collected 3 goals and 10 points in the 2019–20 season.

In his fifth year in the Liiga during the 2020–21 season, Kokkonen was selected as an alternate captain for Jukurit. He made 50 appearances with Jukurit, adding 1 goal and 10 points. To extend his 2020–21 season, Kokkonen agreed to join the Toronto Maple Leafs American Hockey League (AHL) affiliate, the Toronto Marlies, for the remainder of the campaign on 16 April 2021. He played in 11 games with the Marlies, scoring one goal and seven points.

On 15 April 2021, Kokkonen opted to leave his hometown club, furthering his development by agreeing to a two-year contract with fellow Liiga club, the Lahti Pelicans. He played in 58 games for Lahti, registering one goal and 15 points.

On 31 March 2022, the Toronto Maple Leafs announced they had signed Kokkonen to a three-year, entry-level contract, beginning in the 2022–23 season. For the 2022–23 season Kokkonen was assigned first to the Marlies, and then to Toronto's ECHL affiliate, the Newfoundland Growlers. Kokkonen attended the Maple Leafs 2023 training camp and was one of the last players the Maple Leafs assigned to the Marlies to start the 2023–24 season.

After three seasons within the Maple Leafs organization, having played exclusively with affiliates in the AHL and ECHL, Kokkonen left the club as a free agent and was signed to a one-year deal upon his return to Europe with Swedish club, Linköping HC of the SHL, on 11 August 2025.

== International play ==
Kokkonen represented Finland at two World Junior Championships; the first in 2020 and the second in 2021, winning the bronze medal in the latter. Over 14 games, Kokkonen scored two goals and three points.

== Personal life ==
He is from the city of Mikkeli.

== Career statistics ==
=== Regular season and playoffs ===
			Regular season					Playoffs
Season	Team	League	GP	G	A	Pts	PIM	GP	G	A	Pts	PIM
2016–17	Jukurit	Jr. A	38	6	20	26	20	—	—	—	—	—
2016–17	Jukurit	Liiga	1	0	0	0	0	—	—	—	—	—
2016–17	Iisalmen Peli-Karhut	Mestis	3	0	1	1	0	—	—	—	—	—
2017–18	Jukurit	Jr. A	14	0	7	7	4	—	—	—	—	—
2017–18	Jukurit	Liiga	12	0	0	0	4	—	—	—	—	—
2017–18	Ketterä	Mestis	29	0	9	9	6	3	0	1	1	0
2018–19	Jukurit	Liiga	56	3	16	19	20	—	—	—	—	—
2018–19	Jukurit	Jr. A	—	—	—	—	—	3	0	3	3	12
2019–20	Jukurit	Liiga	39	3	7	10	10	—	—	—	—	—
2019–20	Jukurit	Jr. A	10	2	1	3	4	2	1	1	2	0
2020–21	Jukurit	Liiga	50	1	9	10	20	—	—	—	—	—
2020–21	Jukurit	Jr. A	2	0	2	2	0	—	—	—	—	—
2020–21	Toronto Marlies	AHL	11	1	6	7	0	—	—	—	—	—
2021–22	Lahti Pelicans	Liiga	58	1	14	15	20	3	0	0	0	0
2022–23	Toronto Marlies	AHL	36	0	6	6	26	—	—	—	—	—
2022–23	Newfoundland Growlers	ECHL	8	1	2	3	6	13	3	6	9	10
2023–24	Toronto Marlies	AHL	65	5	14	19	28	3	0	1	1	0
2024–25	Toronto Marlies	AHL	50	3	11	14	22	2	0	0	0	0
Liiga totals			216	8	46	54	74	3	0	0	0	0

Medal record

Representing Finland

Ice hockey

World Junior Championships
Bronze medal – third place	2021 Canada	

World U18 Championships
Gold medal – first place	2018 Russia	

=== International ===
Year	Team	Event	Result	GP	G	A	Pts	PIM
2016	Finland	U17	7th	5	0	0	0	2
2017	Finland	IH18	6th	4	1	0	1	4
2018	Finland	U18	1st place, gold medalist(s)	7	0	3	3	0
2018	Finland	HG18	7th	4	2	1	3	6
2020	Finland	WJC	4th	7	2	0	2	4
2021	Finland	WJC	3rd place, bronze medalist(s)	7	0	1	1	0
Junior totals				34	5	5	10	16
