= Stéphane Patry =

Swiss ice hockey player

- Born: February 18, 2000 (age 26) Geneva, Switzerland
- Height: 5 ft 11 in (180 cm)
- Weight: 175 lb (79 kg; 12 st 7 lb)
- Position: Left Wing
- Shoots: Left
- NL team Former teams: HC Lugano; Genève-Servette HC
- NHL draft: Undrafted
- Playing career: 2019–present

Stéphane Patry is a Swiss professional ice hockey left winger who is currently playing with EHC Visp of the Swiss League.

== Playing career ==
Patry started playing hockey with CP Meyrin in different junior teams, before joining Genève-Servette HC U15 team in 2011. Patry played junior hockey for one season with the Erie Otters of the Ontario Hockey League (OHL), appearing in 50 games and tallying 14 points during the 2017–18 season.

He returned to Geneva for the 2018–19 season to play with Genève-Servette HC U20 team and eventually won the Junior Elite A title with the team. During that same season, Patry also made his NL debut with Genève-Servette HC, playing in 6 regular season games.

Patry spent the majority of the 2019–20 season with Genève-Servette HC, playing in 21 games and scored 7 points (3 goals). He also had a brief stint with HC Sierre of the Swiss League (SL), appearing in 10 games and tallying 2 assists.

== International play ==
Patry was picked for Switzerland men's national junior team for the 2020 World Junior Championships.
