= Petr Čajka =

Czech ice hockey player

- Born: 11 December 2000 (age 25) Kadaň, Czech Republic
- Height: 6 ft 0 in (183 cm)
- Weight: 170 lb (77 kg; 12 st 2 lb)
- Position: Centre
- Shoots: Left
- NL team Former teams: SC Rapperswil-Jona Lakers; Genève-Servette HC; Lausanne HC; HC Ambrì-Piotta
- Playing career: 2019–present

Petr Čajka (born 11 December 2000) is a Czech professional ice hockey centre who is currently playing with the SC Rapperswil-Jona Lakers of the National League (NL).

Čajka played most his junior hockey in Switzerland which allows him to compete in the National League and in the Swiss League with a Swiss player-license.

== Playing career ==
Čajka made his professional debut during the 2017–18 season appearing in 2 games with the EVZ Academy of the Swiss League (SL).

Čajka played one season of junior hockey with the Erie Otters of the Ontario Hockey League (OHL) during the 2018–19 season and scored 38 points (20 goals) in 63 regular season games.

On 2 August 2019, Čajka signed his first professional contract with Genève-Servette HC, agreeing to a three-year deal extending from the 2020–21 season through the 2022–23 season. Čajka played the entire 2019/20 season as a junior on Genève-Servette HC U20 team in order to obtain his Swiss-player license for the 2020/21 season. He played 33 regular season games with the U20 team this season, putting up 42 points (17 goals). Čajka made his National League debut on 24 September 2020 against Lausanne HC. He was inserted in the lineup as the team's 4th import player as Henrik Tömmernes was out at the time with an injury. On 28 February 2020, Čajka scored his first NL goal against Lausanne HC at home in an empty Patinoire des Vernets due to the COVID-19 pandemic. He was limited to 5 NL regular season games (2 points) this season.

On 14 September 2020, Čajka was traded, along with Tim Bozon, to Lausanne HC in exchange for Joel Vermin. He was immediately loaned to the HCB Ticino Rockets of the Swiss League (SL) to begin the 2020–21 season. Čajka played 34 games with the Rockets scoring 24 points (10 goals) before being recalled by Lausanne on February 13, 2021. He played 2 games with the team in the NL before being shipped to HC Ambrì-Piotta on 16 February 2021, agreeing to a 2-year deal with the Biancoblu. The deal runs through to the end of the 2021/22 season with an option for the 2022–23 season.

== International play ==
Čajka was named to the Czech Republic men's U20 national team for the 2020 World Junior Championships in the Czech Republic. He scored one goal in 5 games played as the Czechs fell to Sweden in the 1/4 finals.
