= Lassi Thomson =

Finnish ice hockey player (born 2000)

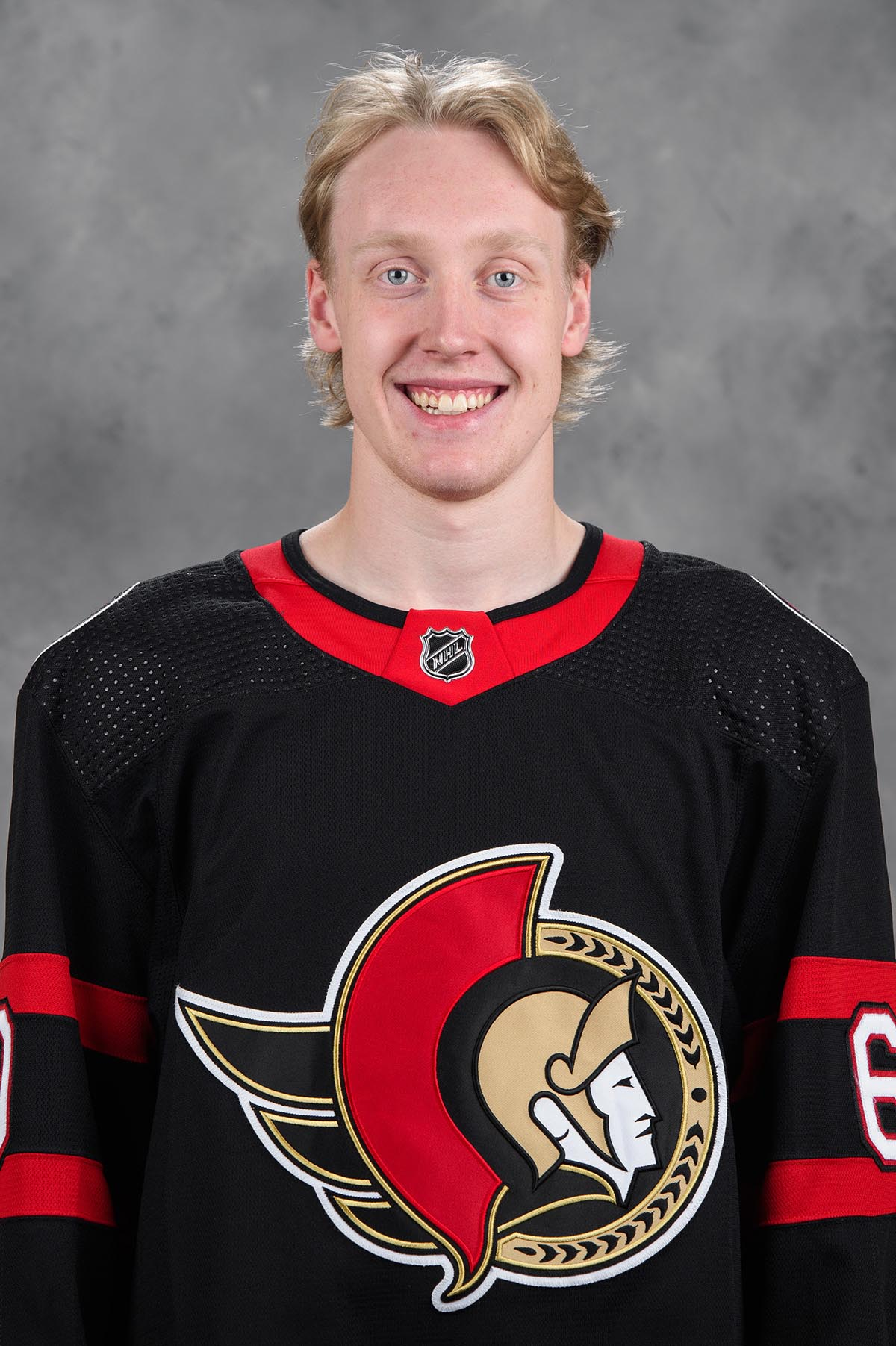
- Thomson with the Ottawa Senators in 2021
- Born: 24 September 2000 (age 25) Tampere, Finland
- Height: 183 cm (6 ft 0 in)
- Weight: 88.5 kg (195 lb; 13 st 13 lb)
- Position: Defence
- Shoots: Right
- NL team Former teams: HC Lugano; Ilves; Ottawa Senators; Malmö Redhawks
- NHL draft: 19th overall, 2019; Ottawa Senators
- Playing career: 2019–present

Lassi Thomson (born 24 September 2000) is a Finnish professional ice hockey who plays as a defenceman for HC Lugano in the Swiss National League. He was selected 19th overall by the Ottawa Senators of the National Hockey League (NHL) in the first round of the 2019 NHL entry draft. He has also previously played for Ilves in Finland and the Malmö Redhawks in Sweden.

== Playing career ==
=== Amateur ===
Thomson played minor ice hockey in Ilves's development system in Finland. In June 2018, he was selected by the Kelowna Rockets of the Western Hockey League (WHL) 53rd overall in the Canadian Hockey League's 2018 import draft. On loan from Ilves, Thomson made his WHL debut in the 2018–19 season and scored 17 goals and 24 assists for 41 points. The Rockets finished in a tie with the Kamloops Blazers for the final WHL playoff spot. The two teams played a one-off tiebreaker game to determine the team which would move on. Kamloops won the game 5–1, knocking Kelowna out of playoff contention.

=== Professional ===
==== Ilves ====
Thomson decided to return to Ilves for the 2019–20 season, and signed a two-year contract with an option year. In his first professional season in Liiga, Thomson appeared in 39 games, scoring seven goals and 13 points. However, the season was cut short when the league announced its cancellation on 13 March 2020 due to the COVID-19 pandemic,. In the following pandemic-shortened 2020–21 season Thomson returned to Ilves to start the season. He recorded only two assists in 18 games.

==== Ottawa Senators ====
Thomson was selected by the Ottawa Senators of the National Hockey League (NHL) in the first round, 19th overall, of the 2019 NHL entry draft. On 15 July 2019, Thomson was signed to a three-year, entry-level contract with the Senators. He joined Ottawa's American Hockey League (AHL) affiliate, the Belleville Senators, during the 2020–21 season and made 35 appearances, tallying one goal and 13 points.

Thomson was invited to the Senators training camp ahead of the 2021–22 season. On 3 October 2021, he was assigned to AHL. Thomson made his NHL debut on 11 November, with the Senators in a 2–0 loss to the Los Angeles Kings after being recalled the same day from Belleville due to a breakout of COVID-19 in the team. He recorded his first NHL point in the following game on 13 November on an assist in a 6–3 victory over the Pittsburgh Penguins. He was returned to Belleville on 8 December, after playing in eleven games. He was recalled for one game on 1 January 2022, against the Toronto Maple Leafs and then called up again on 25 January. He finished the season playing in 16 games for the Senators, tallying five points (all assists). In 44 games with Belleville, he added ten goals and 26 points. Belleville made the playoffs and faced the Rochester Americans in the opening round. However, the Americans eliminated them and in the two games in the series, Thomson was held scoreless. At the beginning of the 2022–23 season, Thomson was assigned to Belleville. He was recalled by Ottawa on 22 November 2022. He was immediately slotted into the roster alongside Nick Holden in the 24 November game versus the Vegas Golden Knights, giving up a goal in the third period. He played one more game before being sent back to Belleville. While with Belleville, Thomson suffered an upper-body injury in December that kept him out for 11 games. He finished the season with seven goals and 33 points in 56 games with Belleville.

On 1 October 2023, after being put on waivers by the Senators, Thomson was claimed by the Anaheim Ducks. However, Anaheim waived Thomson again one week later, and he was subsequently reclaimed by the Senators. He was then assigned to Belleville after no other team put in a claim. Thomson played out the 2023–24 season in Belleville, registering six goals and 21 points through 67 regular season games. He helped Belleville make it to the second round of the Calder Cup playoffs for the first time in team history, but was surpassed by other prospects. In five playoff games, he added two assists.

==== Malmö Redhawks and return to Ottawa ====
As a pending restricted free agent with the Senators, Thomson opted to return to Europe and was signed to a two-year contract with Swedish club, Malmö Redhawks of the Swedish Hockey League (SHL), on 13 May 2024. In 50 games with Malmö, Thomson scored 17 goals and 29 points. The Redhawks made the SHL playoffs and in eight playoff games, he marked three goals and four points.

On 17 June 2025, Thomson was released from the final year of his contract in the SHL and re-signed by the Ottawa Senators on a one-year, two-way contract. He attended Ottawa's training camp and was one of the last cuts by Ottawa at the end of camp. He was placed on waivers in October by the Senators for the purpose of assigning him to Belleville. He started the 2025–26 season with Belleville after going unclaimed but was recalled by Ottawa on 19 November after defenceman Thomas Chabot suffered an injury and the team was going on a seven-game West Coast road trip. He did not play however, and was returned to Belleville on 22 November. On 14 March 2026, he was recalled again, but in his first appearance after being called up on 24 March against the New York Rangers, he was injured in the second period. He returned to the lineup on 28 March and registered his first point of the season on 31 March, assisting on a goal by Michael Amadio in a 6–3 loss to the Florida Panthers. He finished the season with three assists in 11 games with Ottawa and 14 goals and 25 points in 55 appearances with Belleville. The Senators made the playoffs, and faced the Carolina Hurricanes in the opening round. Thomson did not play in the first game, but replaced the injured Artem Zub in game two, making his NHL playoff debut on 20 April. However, the Senators were swept in the first round by the Hurricanes. Thomson went scoreless in his only game.

==== HC Lugano ====
Thomson signed a two-year contract with the Swiss National League team HC Lugano in May 2026.

== International play ==
Medal record

Ice hockey

Representing Finland

IIHF World U18 Championship
Gold medal – first place	2018 Russia	

Thomson won a gold medal with Finland's Under-18 team at the 2018 IIHF World U18 Championships. He was among those players selected to try out for Finland's junior team ahead of the 2019 World Junior Championships. However, he was cut from the team on 21 December 2018. He was successful in making the team the following year in 2020 and was named the team's captain going into the 2020 World Junior Championship. In seven games in the tournament, he tallied three assists. Finland was defeated by Sweden in the bronze medal game to finish fourth in the tournament.

== Personal life ==
Thomson's father is Scottish.

== Career statistics ==
=== Regular season and playoffs ===
			Regular season					Playoffs
Season	Team	League	GP	G	A	Pts	PIM	GP	G	A	Pts	PIM
2017–18	Ilves	U20 SM-sarja	49	12	15	27	44	—	—	—	—	—
2018–19	Kelowna Rockets	WHL	63	17	24	41	40	—	—	—	—	—
2019–20	Ilves	Liiga	39	7	6	13	12	—	—	—	—	—
2020–21	Ilves	Liiga	18	0	2	2	4	—	—	—	—	—
2020–21	Belleville Senators	AHL	35	1	12	13	12	—	—	—	—	—
2021–22	Belleville Senators	AHL	44	10	16	26	54	2	0	0	0	0
2021–22	Ottawa Senators	NHL	16	0	5	5	2	—	—	—	—	—
2022–23	Belleville Senators	AHL	56	7	26	33	28	—	—	—	—	—
2022–23	Ottawa Senators	NHL	2	0	0	0	4	—	—	—	—	—
2023–24	Belleville Senators	AHL	67	6	15	21	56	5	0	2	2	2
2024–25	Malmö Redhawks	SHL	50	17	12	29	26	8	3	1	4	10
2025–26	Belleville Senators	AHL	55	14	11	25	54	—	—	—	—	—
2025–26	Ottawa Senators	NHL	11	0	3	3	0	1	0	0	0	0
Liiga totals			57	7	8	15	16	—	—	—	—	—
SHL totals			50	17	12	29	26	8	3	1	4	10
NHL totals			29	0	8	8	6	—	—	—	—	—

=== International ===
Year	Team	Event	Result	GP	G	A	Pts	PIM
2018	Finland	U18	1st place, gold medalist(s)	7	0	2	2	2
2020	Finland	WJC	4th	7	0	3	3	8
Junior totals				14	0	5	5	10

== Awards and honours ==
Award	Year
WHL
West Second All-Star Team	2019

Awards and achievements
Preceded by Jacob Bernard-Docker	Ottawa Senators first-round draft pick 2019	Succeeded by Tim Stützle
