= Mamonty Yugry =

Mamonty Yugry Yugra Mammoths
- City: Khanty-Mansiysk, Russia
- League: Junior Hockey League
- Conference: Eastern
- Founded: 2011
- Home arena: Arena Ugra (capacity: 5,500)
- Colors
- Affiliate: Yugra Khanty-Mansiysk (KHL)
- Website: Official Page

Franchise history
- 2011–present: Mamonty Yugry

Mamonty Yugry (Russian: Мамонты Югры; English: Yugra Mammoths) is a junior ice hockey team from Khanty-Mansiysk, which contains players from the Yugra Khanty-Mansiysk school. They are members of the Junior Hockey League (MHL), the top tier of junior hockey in the country.
