= Linus Nässén =

Linus Nässén may refer to:

- Linus Nässén (ice hockey, born 1998), Swedish ice hockey defenceman for Timrå IK
- Linus Nässén (ice hockey, born 2000), Swedish ice hockey forward for Frölunda HC
