= Rasmus Sandin =

Swedish ice hockey player (born 2000)

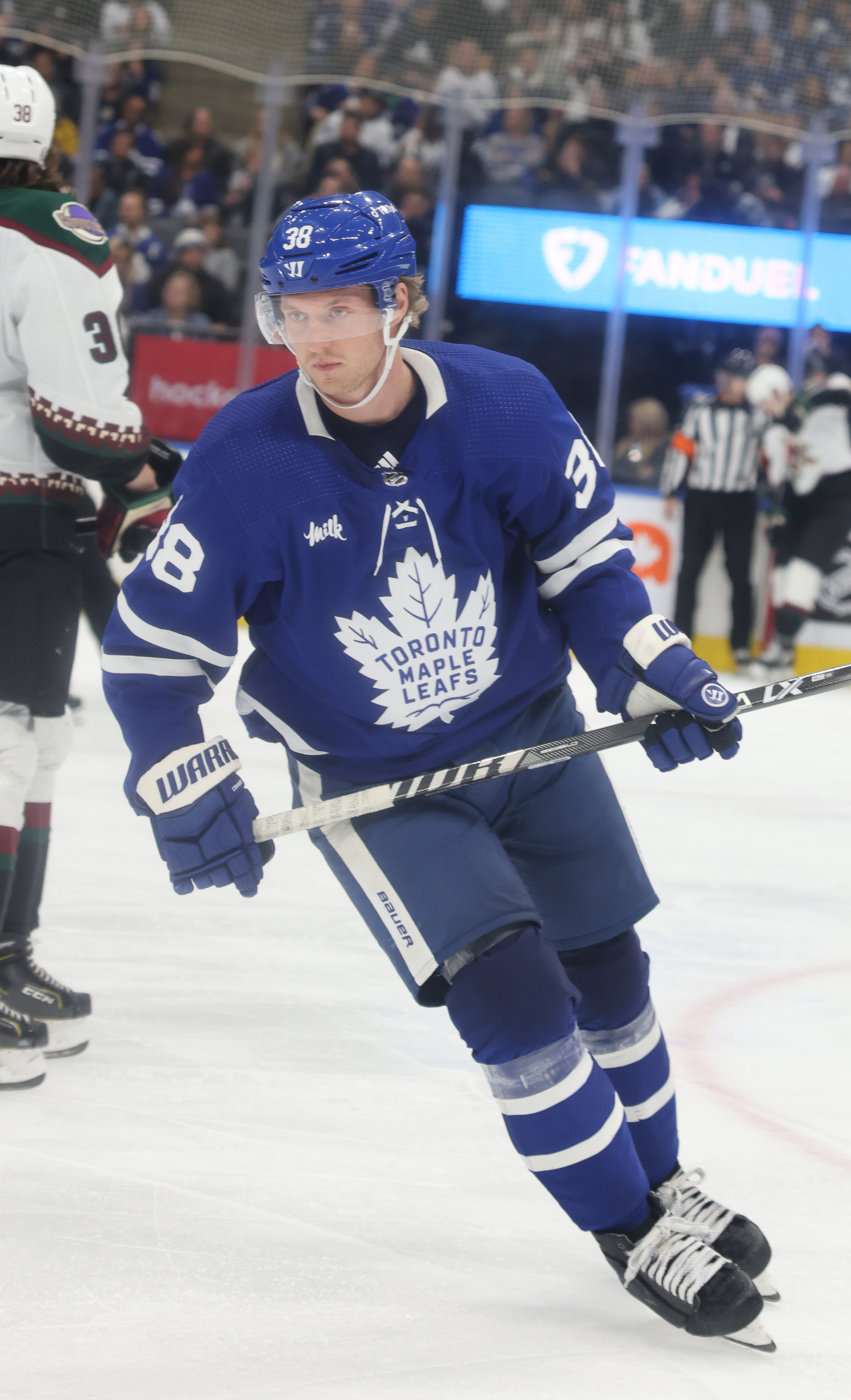
- Sandin with the Toronto Maple Leafs in 2022
- Born: 7 March 2000 (age 26) Uppsala, Sweden
- Height: 5 ft 11 in (180 cm)
- Weight: 189 lb (86 kg; 13 st 7 lb)
- Position: Defence
- Shoots: Left
- NHL team Former teams: Washington Capitals; Rögle BK; Toronto Maple Leafs
- National team: Sweden
- NHL draft: 29th overall, 2018; Toronto Maple Leafs
- Playing career: 2017–present

Carl Erik Rasmus Sandin (born 7 March 2000) is a Swedish professional ice hockey player who is a defenceman for the Washington Capitals of the National Hockey League (NHL). He was selected in the first round, 29th overall by the Toronto Maple Leafs in the 2018 NHL entry draft. Before joining the NHL, Sandin played five games for Rögle BK of the Swedish Hockey League (SHL).

== Early life ==
Sandin was born on 7 March 2000, in Uppsala, Sweden to Helena and Patric Sandin. He grew up alongside his older brother Linus, who also plays professional hockey. Sandin chose to study English in school, as opposed to Spanish and German.

== Playing career ==
=== Major junior ===
Sandin signed with the Modo Hockey organisation at the age of 15 and spent the 2016–17 season with the Brynäs IF in the J20 Nationell. After scoring three goals and 15 assists through 18 games with Brynäs IF, the Sault Ste. Marie Greyhounds of the Canadian Hockey League (CHL) drafted him in the first round of the CHL Import Draft. Despite being drafted, he chose to return to Sweden and begin his professional career with Rögle BK of the Swedish Hockey League (SHL). He recorded one assist through his first five games before using his out-clause and joining the Greyhounds for the 2017–18 season. He chose to leave Rögle BK early in the season to gain more ice time and raise his draft ranking. Upon joining the team, Sandin was partnered with Conor Timmins and quickly became one of the Greyhounds' top defensemen. He made his Greyhounds debut on 28 October 2017, in a loss to the Sarnia Sting, before helping the team set a franchise record with 23 consecutive wins. He scored his first OHL goal in his third game of the season to lift the Greyhounds to a 5–4 overtime win against the Sudbury Wolves. As the Greyhounds continued their winning streak, the NHL Central Scouting Bureau ranked Sandin among the top prospects eligible for the 2018 NHL entry draft. As a result of his high draft ranking, Sandin was named to the 2018 CHL/NHL Top Prospects Game. After recording nine points in 11 games through December, Sandin was honored as the OHL Rookie of the Month. On 11 March 2018, Sandin and Timmins scored 30 seconds apart to help the Greyhounds set a new franchise records for most points in a season. Sandin finished the regular season leading all rookie defensemen with 12 goals and 33 assists for 45 points. As such, he received the team's Rookie of the Year award, was a finalist for the Emms Family Award, and chosen for the 2017-18 OHL All-Rookie First Team.

Sandin attended the NHL combine as a top prospect for the 2018 NHL entry draft and interviewed with 27 NHL teams. After finishing his rookie season with the Greyhounds, the NHL Central Scouting Bureau ranked him 11th among all North American skaters. He was eventually selected in the first round, 29th overall, by the Toronto Maple Leafs. On 16 July, Sandin signed a three-year entry-level contract with the Maple Leafs.

=== Toronto Maple Leafs (2018–2023) ===
After attending the Maple Leafs' 2018 training camp, Sandin was reassigned to their American Hockey League (AHL) affiliate, the Toronto Marlies, for the 2018–19 season. However, Sandin suffered a thumb injury before he was able to make his AHL debut. Once he recovered, Sandin scored his first AHL goal in his AHL debut on 26 October against the Syracuse Crunch. Upon making his debut at the age of 18, Sandin became the youngest player on any AHL roster. He recorded five points over his first six games with the Marlies and finished November with four goals and two assists through 10 games. He improved to five goals and five assists in 18 games before joining Team Sweden for the 2019 World Junior Ice Hockey Championships. However, he injured his elbow during the tournament and was expected to miss four to six weeks to recover. In March, Sandin set a new franchise record for longest point streak by a defenceman after collecting 12 points through eight consecutive games. He finished the 2018–19 regular season with six goals and 28 points through 44 games and added 10 points in 13 playoff games before the Marlies were eliminated in the Eastern Conference final.

After participating in his second training camp with the Maple Leafs, Sandin was named to their opening night roster for the 2019–20 season. He scored his first NHL point, an assist, in his NHL debut on 2 October 2019 against the Ottawa Senators. Upon making his debut, Sandin became the first 19-year-old defenceman to play for the team since Morgan Rielly in 2013. After playing 8:58 in his debut, Sandin averaged just over 10 minutes in his next two games. He scored two assists through his first six games at the NHL level before being reassigned to the Marlies on 14 October. Sandin recorded nine points through eight games with the Marlies before suffering an injury on 16 November during a game against the Texas Stars. When he left the AHL to join Team Sweden for the 2020 World Junior Ice Hockey Championships, he had recorded 15 points through 21 games. After returning from the World Juniors, Sandin was recalled to the NHL level on 13 January 2020. Upon rejoining the Leafs, Sandin scored two assists in their 7–4 win over the New Jersey Devils. He scored his first NHL goal and tallied an assist in the Leafs 5–2 win over the Nashville Predators on 27 January 2020. When the NHL paused the regular season due to the COVID-19 pandemic on 12 March, Sandin had recorded one goal and eight points through 28 games. He joined the Leafs for the 2020 Stanley Cup playoffs, but never played a game in their series against the Columbus Blue Jackets.

After participating in training camp, Sandin was assigned to the Leafs taxi squad for the shortened 2021–22 season. He recorded an assist in one game with the Leafs before being loaned to the Marlies to get more playing time. He recorded one assist in his first game with the Marlies but also injured his foot blocking a shot. This injury kept him sidelined until late April when he was recalled to the NHL level as a replacement for various injured players. The call-up coincided with three Marlies games being canceled due to a positive COVID-19 test. Sandin replaced Zach Bogosian in the Leafs lineup and quickly amassed three assists through six games. He added one more assist before being sidelined for the remainder of the regular season due to salary cap constraints. After making his 2021 Stanley Cup playoffs debut in Game 1 against the Montreal Canadiens, Sandin scored his first playoff goal in Game 2.

=== Washington Capitals (2023–present) ===
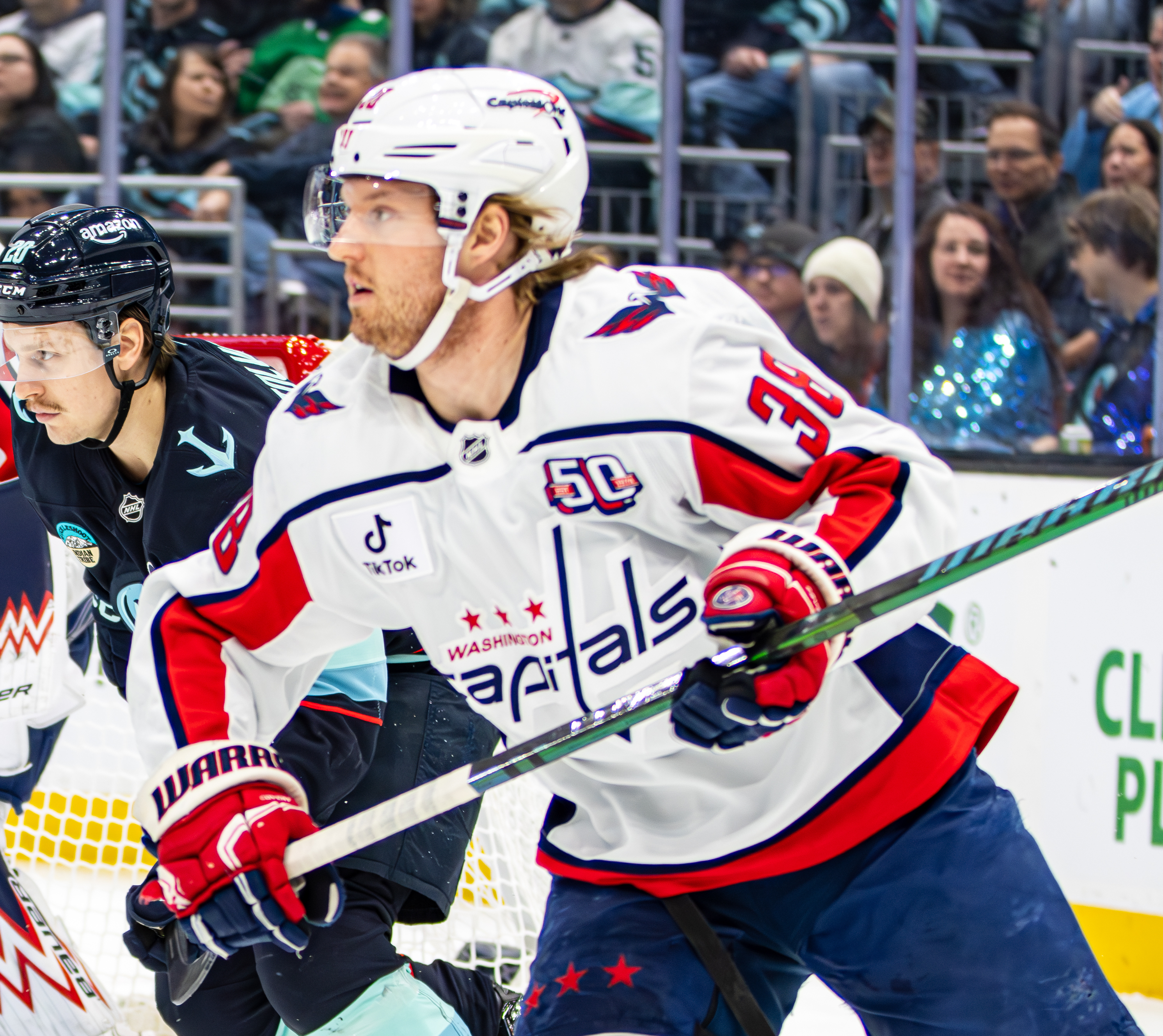
Sandin with the Capitals in 2025.

On 28 February 2023, Sandin was traded to the Washington Capitals in exchange for Erik Gustafsson and a 2023 first-round draft pick. Due to visa issues, he was unable to join the team for their game against the Anaheim Ducks. Upon being cleared to play on 4 March, Sandin became the first defenseman in franchise history to score three points in his team debut. While veteran defenceman John Carlson was sidelined due to an injury, Sandin averaged over 20 minutes of ice time per game. With this increased ice time, Sandin had three multi-point games and recorded a total of eight points through his first four games with the Capitals. He became the first player in franchise history to record three multi-point games within that short timespan. He finished the regular season with a career-high seven goals and 28 assists through 71 games, while also ranking second on the team in time on ice per game. As the Capitals failed to qualify for the 2023 Stanley Cup playoffs, Sandin was named to Team Sweden for the 2023 IIHF World Championship.

Sandin signed a five-year, $23 million contract extension with the Capitals as a restricted free agent on 6 March 2024. He suffered an upper-body injury on 7 April in a 3–2 overtime loss to the Ottawa Senators and was expected to miss significant time to recover. While the injury kept him out for the remainder of the regular season, Sandin set new career-highs with 20 assists and 23 points. Sandin missed the first three games of the Capitals first-round series against the New York Rangers before debuting in Game 4.

== International play ==
Medal record

Representing Sweden

Ice hockey

World Championships
Bronze medal – third place	2025 Sweden/Denmark	

World Junior Championships
Bronze medal – third place	2020 Czech Republic	

Sandin represented Team Sweden at the 2016 World U-17 Hockey Challenge, 2017 Ivan Hlinka Memorial Tournament, 2019 World Junior Ice Hockey Championships, 2020 World Junior Ice Hockey Championships, and 2023 IIHF World Championship.

== Personal life ==
In 2023, Sandin became an ambassador for the Börje Salming ALS Foundation.

== Career statistics ==
=== Regular season and playoffs ===
			Regular season					Playoffs
Season	Team	League	GP	G	A	Pts	PIM	GP	G	A	Pts	PIM
2016–17	Brynäs IF	J20	36	3	15	18	14	2	0	1	1	2
2017–18	Rögle BK	SHL	5	0	1	1	2	—	—	—	—	—
2017–18	Sault Ste. Marie Greyhounds	OHL	51	12	33	45	24	24	1	12	13	8
2018–19	Toronto Marlies	AHL	44	6	22	28	16	13	0	10	10	6
2019–20	Toronto Maple Leafs	NHL	28	1	7	8	10	—	—	—	—	—
2019–20	Toronto Marlies	AHL	21	2	13	15	17	—	—	—	—	—
2020–21	Toronto Maple Leafs	NHL	9	0	4	4	0	5	1	0	1	0
2020–21	Toronto Marlies	AHL	1	0	0	0	0	—	—	—	—	—
2021–22	Toronto Maple Leafs	NHL	51	5	11	16	4	—	—	—	—	—
2022–23	Toronto Maple Leafs	NHL	52	4	16	20	23	—	—	—	—	—
2022–23	Washington Capitals	NHL	19	3	12	15	16	—	—	—	—	—
2023–24	Washington Capitals	NHL	68	3	20	23	24	1	0	0	0	2
2024–25	Washington Capitals	NHL	82	4	26	30	23	10	0	1	1	0
2025–26	Washington Capitals	NHL	73	5	24	29	12	—	—	—	—	—
SHL totals			5	0	1	1	2	—	—	—	—	—
NHL totals			382	25	120	145	112	16	1	1	2	2

=== International ===
Year	Team	Event	Result	GP	G	A	Pts	PIM
2016	Sweden	U17	1st place, gold medalist(s)	6	0	2	2	2
2017	Sweden	IH18	3rd place, bronze medalist(s)	5	0	3	3	2
2019	Sweden	WJC	5th	5	2	2	4	4
2020	Sweden	WJC	3rd place, bronze medalist(s)	7	3	7	10	6
2023	Sweden	WC	6th	7	0	1	1	4
2025	Sweden	WC	3rd place, bronze medalist(s)	4	0	3	3	0
Junior totals				23	5	14	19	14
Senior totals				11	0	4	4	4

Awards and achievements
Preceded by Timothy Liljegren	Toronto Maple Leafs first-round draft pick 2018	Succeeded by Rodion Amirov
