= Michal Teplý =

Czech ice hockey player (born 2001)

- Teplý in 2026
- Born: 27 May 2001 (age 25) Havlíčkův Brod, Czech Republic
- Height: 6 ft 3 in (191 cm)
- Weight: 187 lb (85 kg; 13 st 5 lb)
- Position: Left wing
- Shoots: Right
- ELH team Former teams: HC Oceláři Třinec; Bílí Tygři Liberec; BK Mladá Boleslav; Rockford IceHogs
- NHL draft: 105th overall, 2019; Chicago Blackhawks
- Playing career: 2017–present

Michal Teplý (born 27 May 2001) is a Czech professional ice hockey left winger who is currently playing with HC Oceláři Třinec of the Czech Extraliga (ELH).

== Playing career ==
Teplý was selected 105th overall in the 2019 NHL entry draft by the Chicago Blackhawks. In order to further his development he was drafted fourth overall by the then Kootenay Ice in the 2019 CHL Import Draft. Moving to North America he played in the Western Hockey League for the inaugural season with the Winnipeg Ice in 2019–20, posting 29 goals and 63 points in 53 games.

On 11 April 2020, Teplý was signed by the Chicago Blackhawks to a three-year, entry-level contract. With the following 2020–21 North American season set to be delayed due to the COVID-19 pandemic, Teplý returned to his native Czech Republic to join BK Mladá Boleslav of the Czech Extraliga on loan from the Blackhawks on 6 September 2020.

At the conclusion of his entry-level contract with the Blackhawks, Teply left as a free agent and returned to his native Czechia, securing a three-year deal with HC Oceláři Třinec of the ELH on 24 July 2024.

== Career statistics ==
=== Regular season and playoffs ===
			Regular season					Playoffs
Season	Team	League	GP	G	A	Pts	PIM	GP	G	A	Pts	PIM
2017–18	HC Benátky nad Jizerou	Czech. 1	14	0	0	0	0	—	—	—	—	—
2018–19	HC Bílí Tygři Liberec	ELH	15	0	2	2	2	—	—	—	—	—
2018–19	HC Benátky nad Jizerou	Czech. 1	23	4	6	10	8	—	—	—	—	—
2019–20	Winnipeg Ice	WHL	53	29	34	63	16	—	—	—	—	—
2020–21	BK Mladá Boleslav	ELH	1	0	0	0	0	—	—	—	—	—
2020–21	HC Stadion Litoměřice	Czech. 1	3	0	3	3	2	—	—	—	—	—
2020–21	Rockford IceHogs	AHL	18	0	5	5	6	—	—	—	—	—
2021–22	Rockford IceHogs	AHL	60	13	18	31	6	5	0	1	1	0
2022–23	Rockford IceHogs	AHL	56	9	16	25	10	5	2	1	3	2
2023–24	Rockford IceHogs	AHL	72	12	18	30	12	4	2	0	2	2
ELH totals			16	0	2	2	2	—	—	—	—	—

=== International ===
Year	Team	Event	Result	GP	G	A	Pts	PIM
2018	Czech Republic	HG18	5th	4	1	3	4	4
2018	Czech Republic	U18	4th	7	1	2	3	2
2019	Czech Republic	U18	6th	5	0	3	3	0
2020	Czech Republic	WJC	7th	5	0	5	5	0
2021	Czech Republic	WJC	7th	5	0	2	2	0
Junior totals				26	2	15	17	6
