= Tim Berni =

Swiss ice hockey player (born 2000)

- Born: 11 February 2000 (age 26) Männedorf, Switzerland
- Height: 6 ft 0 in (183 cm)
- Weight: 185 lb (84 kg; 13 st 3 lb)
- Position: Defence
- Shoots: Left
- NL team Former teams: ZSC Lions; Columbus Blue Jackets; Genève-Servette HC
- National team: Switzerland
- NHL draft: 159th overall, 2018; Columbus Blue Jackets
- Playing career: 2017–present

Tim Berni (born 11 February 2000) is a Swiss professional ice hockey player who is a defenceman for ZSC Lions of the National League (NL). He was selected by the Columbus Blue Jackets in the sixth round, 159th overall, of the 2018 NHL entry draft.

== Playing career ==
Berni made his professional debut during the 2017–18 season with the GCK Lions of the Swiss League (SL). He also made his National League (NL) debut that same season with the ZSC Lions, appearing in 8 games with no points. On 12 June 2018, Berni signed his first professional contract, agreeing to a two-year contract with an option with the ZSC Lions. His option was exercised on 25 March 2019, at the end of the relegation round.

On 2 April 2020, Berni signed a three-year entry-level contract with the Columbus Blue Jackets of the National Hockey League (NHL). He was returned to the ZSC Lions on a temporary loan by the Blue Jackets until the commencement of the delayed 2020–21 North American season on 14 August 2020.

== International play ==
Medal record

Ice hockey

Representing Switzerland

World Championships
Silver medal – second place	2025 Sweden/Denmark	
Silver medal – second place	2026 Switzerland	

Berni was named to Switzerland's U20 national team for the 2018 World Junior Championships. He played 5 games, scoring no points. He made the team again for the 2019 World Junior Championships, playing all 7 games (2 assists) to help Switzerland finish 4th in the tournament. Berni was named to the team for the 2020 World Junior Championships, his last season of eligibility.

== Personal life ==
Berni completed an apprenticeship at Allianz during his first years in Zurich.

== Career statistics ==
=== Regular season and playoffs ===
			Regular season					Playoffs
Season	Team	League	GP	G	A	Pts	PIM	GP	G	A	Pts	PIM
2016–17	GCK Lions	Elite Jr. A	41	4	12	16	18	12	0	3	3	20
2017–18	GCK Lions	Elite Jr. A	1	0	1	1	0	1	0	1	1	0
2017–18	GCK Lions	SL	36	5	10	15	41	—	—	—	—	—
2017–18	ZSC Lions	NL	8	0	0	0	0	15	0	0	0	6
2018–19	ZSC Lions	NL	41	1	7	8	8	—	—	—	—	—
2018–19	GCK Lions	SL	3	1	0	1	0	—	—	—	—	—
2018–19	GCK Lions	Elite Jr. A	—	—	—	—	—	1	0	0	0	2
2019–20	ZSC Lions	NL	45	4	7	11	8	—	—	—	—	—
2020–21	ZSC Lions	NL	52	4	3	7	20	9	1	2	3	6
2021–22	Cleveland Monsters	AHL	72	3	12	15	44	—	—	—	—	—
2022–23	Cleveland Monsters	AHL	17	1	3	4	12	—	—	—	—	—
2022–23	Columbus Blue Jackets	NHL	59	1	2	3	34	—	—	—	—	—
2023–24	Genève-Servette HC	NL	41	4	9	13	16	2	0	1	1	0
2024–25	Genève-Servette HC	NL	52	7	6	13	16	—	—	—	—	—
2025–26	Genève-Servette HC	NL	50	2	14	16	35	12	0	0	0	0
NL totals			289	22	46	68	103	38	1	3	4	12
NHL totals			59	1	2	3	34	—	—	—	—	—

=== International ===
Year	Team	Event	Result	GP	G	A	Pts	PIM
2017	Switzerland	U18	8th	5	0	0	0	2
2017	Switzerland	IH18	7th	4	0	0	0	2
2018	Switzerland	WJC	8th	5	0	0	0	2
2019	Switzerland	WJC	4th	7	0	2	2	2
2020	Switzerland	WJC	5th	5	0	3	3	4
2025	Switzerland	WC	2nd place, silver medalist(s)	10	0	1	1	2
2026	Switzerland	OG	5th	3	0	0	0	0
2026	Switzerland	WC	2nd place, silver medalist(s)	10	0	1	1	2
Junior totals				26	0	5	5	12
Senior totals				23	0	2	2	4
