= Calen Addison =

Canadian ice hockey player (born 2000)

- Born: April 11, 2000 (age 26) Brandon, Manitoba, Canada
- Height: 5 ft 11 in (180 cm)
- Weight: 173 lb (78 kg; 12 st 5 lb)
- Position: Defence
- Shoots: Right
- KHL team Former teams: Shanghai Dragons; Minnesota Wild; San Jose Sharks
- NHL draft: 53rd overall, 2018; Pittsburgh Penguins
- Playing career: 2019–present

Calen Addison (born April 11, 2000) is a Canadian professional ice hockey defenceman for the Shanghai Dragons of the Kontinental Hockey League (KHL). He was selected by the Pittsburgh Penguins of the National Hockey League (NHL) in the second round, 53rd overall, of the 2018 NHL entry draft. He has previously played for the Minnesota Wild and San Jose Sharks.

== Early life ==
Addison was born on April 11, 2000, in Brandon, Manitoba to parents Darren and Shannon. Addison is Métis. When he was two years old, his family moved to Thompson, where he first learned to skate, before returning to Brandon when he was seven. Growing up in Brandon, he attended Kirkaldy Heights School.

== Playing career ==
=== Junior ===
Addison was selected second overall in the Western Hockey League (WHL)'s 2015 bantam draft by the Lethbridge Hurricanes. He made his debut for the Hurricanes in the 2015–16 season, playing four games for Lethbridge, going scoreless. In his first full WHL season in 2016–17, he appeared in 63 games for Lethbridge, scoring nine goals and 24 assists for 33 points. The Hurricanes finished first in their division and returned to the WHL playoffs for the first time since 2009. He played in 13 playoff games, adding two assists as Lethbridge was eliminated in the conference finals.

In his second season with the Hurricanes in 2017–18, he led the team's defencemen in scoring and third overall, with 11 goals and 65 points in 68 games. The Hurricanes advanced to the conference finals in the 2018 playoffs, but were eliminated again in the series. Addison added seven goals and 19 points in Lethbridge's 16 playoff games. He returned to Lethbridge for a third season in 2018–19 in which he scored the identical number of goals, assists and points as the previous season, in 67 games. However, despite making the 2019 playoffs, the Hurricanes were knocked out in the opening round. In seven playoff games, he scored two goals and nine points. In his final season of junior in the 2019–20 season, he played 50 games with Lethbridge, scoring ten goals and 52 points before the season was cancelled due to the COVID-19 pandemic on March 18, 2020. Addison was named a WHL Eastern Conference First Team All-Star for the 2019–20 season.

=== Professional ===
Addison was selected by the Pittsburgh Penguins of the National Hockey League in the second round, 53rd overall, in the 2018 NHL entry draft. He was signed by the Penguins to a three-year, entry-level contract on April 7, 2019. After his junior team was eliminated in the 2019 WHL playoffs, Addison joined Pittsburgh's American Hockey League (AHL) affiliate, the Wilkes-Barre/Scranton Penguins on an amateur tryout contract on April 19, 2019. He played in three games with Wilkes-Barre/Scranton, registering two assists.

Addison was traded by the Penguins along with forward Alex Galchenyuk and a conditional first-round pick in the 2020 NHL entry draft to the Minnesota Wild in exchange for forward Jason Zucker on February 10, 2020. To begin the pandemic-delayed 2020–21 season, Addison was assigned to Minnesota's AHL affiliate, the Iowa Wild. He was recalled due to a shortage of available defencemen for Minnesota and made his NHL debut on February 16, 2021, in the Wild's 4–0 loss to the Los Angeles Kings. He played in three regular season games for Minnesota. With Iowa he appeared in 31 games, scoring six goals and 22 points and was named to the AHL's 2020–21 All-Rookie Team. The Wild made the 2021 Stanley Cup playoffs and faced the Vegas Golden Knights in the first round. Addison made his NHL playoff debut on May 24, replacing the injured Carson Soucy, registering an assist on Jordan Greenway's goal in the first period of the Game 5 victory. The Wild were eliminated by the Golden Knights, and Addison registered just the one point in three games.

He began the 2021–22 season with Iowa and appeared in four games before being recalled by Minnesota on October 29. He made his NHL season debut on October 30 in a 4–1 loss to the Colorado Avalanche. In the next game on November 2, 2021, he scored his first NHL goal against goaltender Filip Gustavsson in a 5–4 overtime win against the Ottawa Senators. He spent the rest of the season bouncing between Iowa and Minnesota. He finished the season playing in 15 games with Minnesota, scoring two goals and four points. In 43 games with Iowa, he registered seven goals and 34 points. Addison made the Wild's opening night roster for the 2022–23 season and registered his first three-point game on October 17, 2022, assisting on all three goals by the Wild in a 6–3 loss to the Avalanche. He had his second three-point in the season on January 4, 2023, scoring one goal and assisting on goals by Kirill Kaprizov and Joel Eriksson Ek in a 5–1 victory over the Tampa Bay Lightning. He was the first rookie defenceman in franchise history to record multiple three-point games in a season. However, towards the end of the season, he struggled and was a healthy scratch for many games, especially after the Wild acquired defenceman John Klingberg at the trade deadline. He finished the season with three goals and 32 points in 62 games.

A restricted free agent in the offseason, Addison signed a one-year contract with the Wild. He once again made the opening night roster for the Wild in the 2023–24 season. On November 8, 2023, Addison was traded to the San Jose Sharks in exchange for Adam Raška and a 2026 fifth-round pick. He made 12 appearances with the Wild, registering five assists. He made his Sharks debut on November 9 in a 3–2 victory over the Edmonton Oilers. He registered his first point with the Sharks on November 20, assisting on Tomáš Hertl's goal in a 3–1 loss to the Vancouver Canucks and scored his first goal for the team and of the season in a 5–4 loss to the Vegas Golden Knights on December 10. He finished the season appearing in 60 games for the Sharks, scoring the one goal and 12 points.

After a lone season with the Sharks, Addison was not tendered a qualifying offer and left as an unrestricted free agent. After going un-signed over the summer, Addison accepted an invitation to attend the Ottawa Senators training camp for the 2024–25 season on a professional tryout (PTO) on September 6, 2024. After being released from his PTO, Addison joined the AHL Henderson Silver Knights on a one-year contract on October 24. Addison as a fixture on the Silver Knights blueline, tallied 3 goals and 30 assists for a team leading 33 points through 49 appearances. On March 8, 2025, Addison was traded by Henderson to the Springfield Thunderbirds in exchange for future considerations.

As a free agent, Addison secured an NHL contract for the 2025–26 season, signing a one-year, two-way contract with the New Jersey Devils on July 1, 2025. For the duration of his tenure with the Devils, Addison played exclusively with AHL affiliate the Utica Comets, posting 31 points through 65 regular season games.

Addison left the Devils at the conclusion of his contract and signed his first deal abroad in agreeing to a one-year deal with Chinese club, Shanghai Dragons of the KHL, on August 12, 2026.

== International play ==
Medal record

Representing Canada

Ice hockey

World Junior Championships
Gold medal – first place	2020 Czech Republic	

Addison has represented Canada at the international level since 2017. He first joined Team Canada for the 2016 World U-17 Hockey Challenge, where he won a silver medal. Following this, he competed at the 2017 Ivan Hlinka Memorial Tournament where he tallied two goals and six points to win a gold medal.

Addison did not return to Team Canada until he was selected for the 2020 World Junior Ice Hockey Championships. He led the tournament in assists for defencemen (8) and won a gold medal.

== Career statistics ==
=== Regular season and playoffs ===
			Regular season					Playoffs
Season	Team	League	GP	G	A	Pts	PIM	GP	G	A	Pts	PIM
2015–16	Brandon Wheat Kings U18	MMHL	15	8	7	15	42	2	2	0	2	15
2015–16	Lethbridge Hurricanes	WHL	4	0	0	0	2	3	0	0	0	0
2016–17	Lethbridge Hurricanes	WHL	63	9	24	33	52	13	0	2	2	4
2017–18	Lethbridge Hurricanes	WHL	68	11	54	65	53	16	7	12	19	20
2018–19	Lethbridge Hurricanes	WHL	67	11	54	65	52	7	2	7	9	4
2018–19	Wilkes-Barre/Scranton Penguins	AHL	3	0	2	2	0	—	—	—	—	—
2019–20	Lethbridge Hurricanes	WHL	50	10	42	52	51	—	—	—	—	—
2020–21	Iowa Wild	AHL	31	6	16	22	33	—	—	—	—	—
2020–21	Minnesota Wild	NHL	3	0	0	0	0	3	0	1	1	0
2021–22	Iowa Wild	AHL	43	7	27	34	70	—	—	—	—	—
2021–22	Minnesota Wild	NHL	15	2	2	4	2	—	—	—	—	—
2022–23	Minnesota Wild	NHL	62	3	26	29	22	—	—	—	—	—
2023–24	Minnesota Wild	NHL	12	0	5	5	6	—	—	—	—	—
2023–24	San Jose Sharks	NHL	60	1	11	12	66	—	—	—	—	—
2024–25	Henderson Silver Knights	AHL	49	3	30	33	55	—	—	—	—	—
2024–25	Springfield Thunderbirds	AHL	13	2	1	3	8	—	—	—	—	—
2025–26	Utica Comets	AHL	65	6	25	31	32	—	—	—	—	—
NHL totals			152	6	44	50	96	3	0	1	1	0

=== International ===
Year	Team	Event	Result	GP	G	A	Pts	PIM
2016	Canada Black	U17	2nd place, silver medalist(s)	6	0	3	3	0
2017	Canada	IH18	1st place, gold medalist(s)	5	2	4	6	4
2020	Canada	WJC	1st place, gold medalist(s)	7	1	8	9	0
Junior totals				18	3	15	18	4

== Awards and honours ==
Award	Year	Ref
WHL
East First All-Star Team	2020	
AHL
All-Rookie Team	2021	
