= Dmitri Voronkov =

Russian ice hockey player (born 2000)

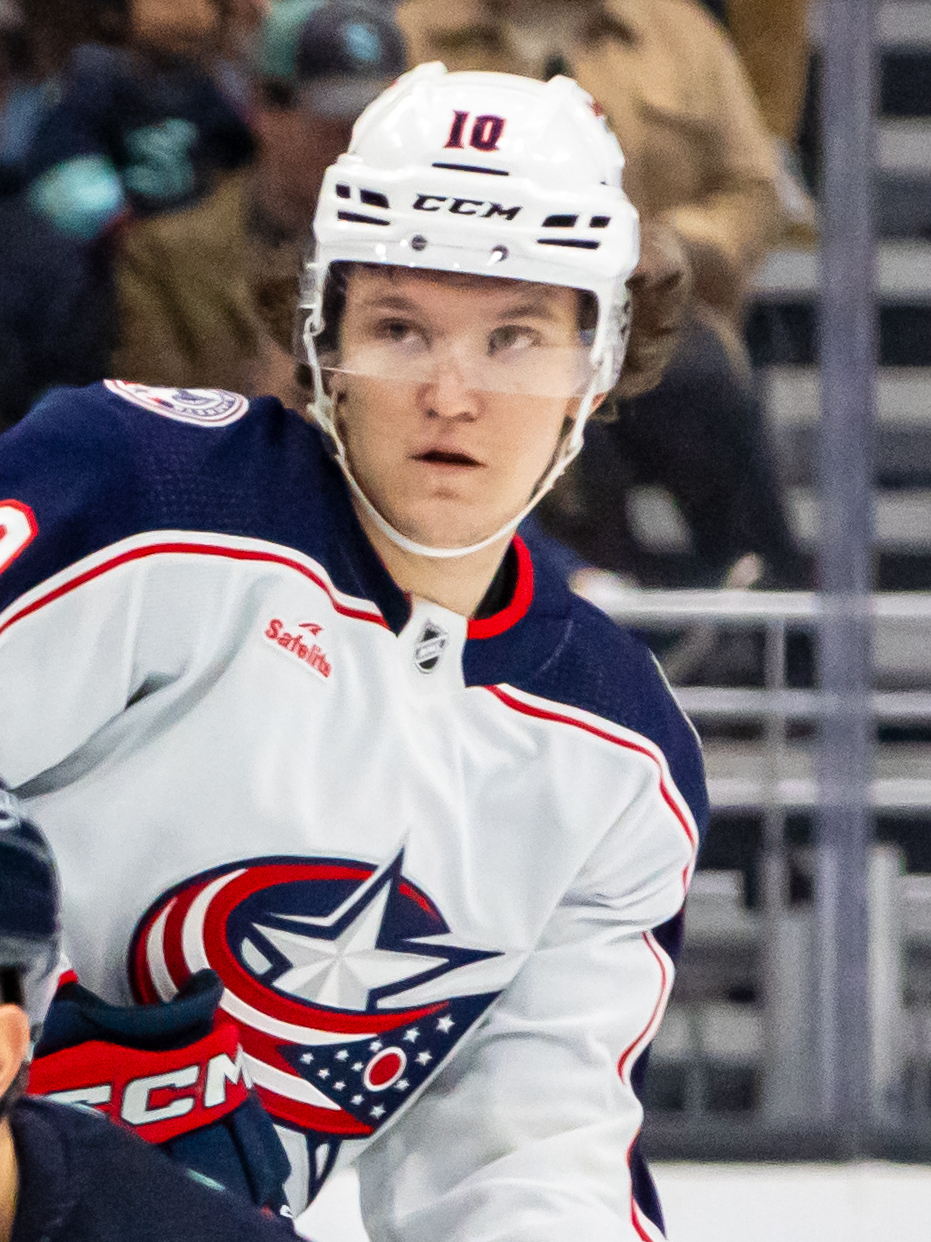
- Voronkov playing with the Columbus Blue Jackets in January 2024
- Born: 10 September 2000 (age 26) Angarsk, Russia
- Height: 6 ft 5 in (196 cm)
- Weight: 227 lb (103 kg; 16 st 3 lb)
- Position: Forward
- Shoots: Left
- NHL team Former teams: Columbus Blue Jackets; Ak Bars Kazan
- National team: Russia
- NHL draft: 114th overall, 2019; Columbus Blue Jackets
- Playing career: 2017–present

Dmitri Sergeiyevich Voronkov (Russian: Дмитрий Сергеевич Воронков; born 10 September 2000) is a Russian professional ice hockey player who is a forward for the Columbus Blue Jackets of the National Hockey League (NHL).

== Playing career ==
Voronkov made his KHL debut for Ak Bars Kazan during the 2018–19 season, playing in three regular season games and one playoff game in February 2019. He was drafted 114th overall by the Columbus Blue Jackets in the 2019 NHL entry draft.

Following his fifth season with Ak Bars in 2022–23, helping the club reach the Gagarin Cup finals, Voronkov signed a two-year, entry-level contract to join the Columbus Blue Jackets on 4 April 2023.

== International play ==
Medal record

Ice hockey

Representing ROC

Olympic Games
Silver medal – second place	2022 Beijing	

Representing Russia

World Junior Championships
Silver medal – second place	2020 Czech Republic	

On 23 January 2022, Voronkov was named to the roster to represent Russian Olympic Committee athletes at the 2022 Winter Olympics.

== Career statistics ==
=== Regular season and playoffs ===
			Regular season					Playoffs
Season	Team	League	GP	G	A	Pts	PIM	GP	G	A	Pts	PIM
2015–16	Yermak Angarsk	RUS U17	36	33	23	56	18	—	—	—	—	—
2016–17	Yermak Angarsk	RUS U18	37	35	16	51	24	—	—	—	—	—
2017–18	Yermak Angarsk	RUS U18	19	27	23	50	50	—	—	—	—	—
2017–18	Yermak Angarsk	VHL	14	0	0	0	6	—	—	—	—	—
2018–19	Irbis Kazan	MHL	3	1	1	2	33	—	—	—	—	—
2018–19	Ak Bars Kazan	KHL	3	0	0	0	0	1	0	0	0	0
2018–19	Bars Kazan	VHL	50	7	7	14	49	—	—	—	—	—
2019–20	Ak Bars Kazan	KHL	34	5	7	12	29	4	1	1	2	0
2020–21	Ak Bars Kazan	KHL	53	7	12	19	41	15	6	4	10	8
2021–22	Ak Bars Kazan	KHL	38	7	5	12	36	6	0	1	1	6
2022–23	Ak Bars Kazan	KHL	54	18	13	31	51	24	8	4	12	16
2023–24	Cleveland Monsters	AHL	4	0	1	1	2	—	—	—	—	—
2023–24	Columbus Blue Jackets	NHL	75	18	16	34	52	—	—	—	—	—
2024–25	Columbus Blue Jackets	NHL	73	23	24	47	55	—	—	—	—	—
2025–26	Columbus Blue Jackets	NHL	63	17	15	32	59	—	—	—	—	—
KHL totals			182	37	37	74	157	50	15	10	25	30
NHL totals			211	58	55	113	166	—	—	—	—	—

=== International ===
Year	Team	Event	Result	GP	G	A	Pts	PIM
2020	Russia	WJC	2nd place, silver medalist(s)	7	3	4	7	16
2021	ROC	WC	5th	8	2	4	6	2
2022	ROC	OG	2nd place, silver medalist(s)	6	0	1	1	29
Junior totals				7	3	4	7	16
Senior totals				14	2	5	7	31
