= Joel Hofer =

Canadian ice hockey player (born 2000)

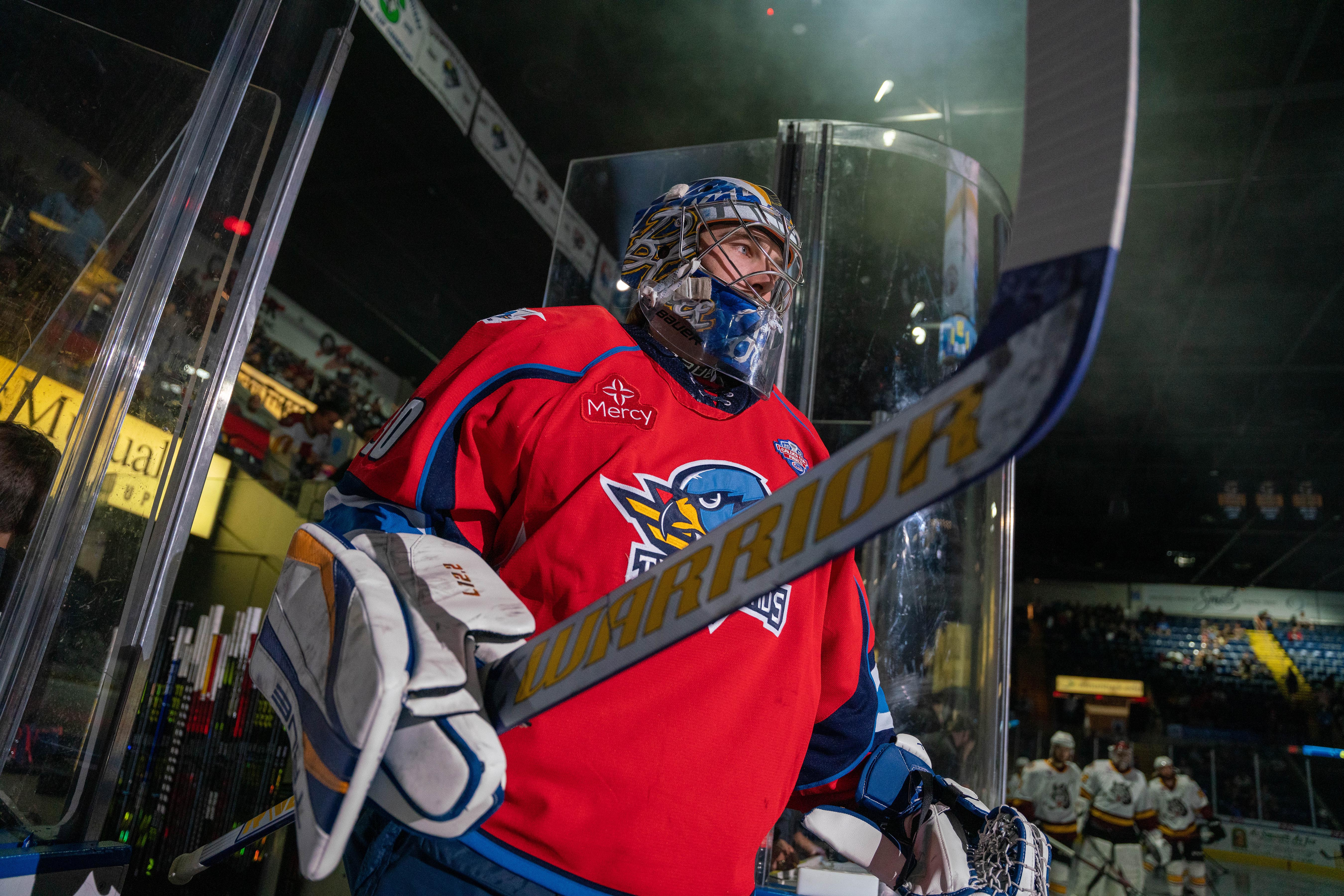
- Hofer with the Springfield Thunderbirds in 2022
- Born: July 30, 2000 (age 26) Winnipeg, Manitoba, Canada
- Height: 6 ft 5 in (196 cm)
- Weight: 179 lb (81 kg; 12 st 11 lb)
- Position: Goaltender
- Catches: Left
- NHL team: St. Louis Blues
- National team: Canada
- NHL draft: 107th overall, 2018; St. Louis Blues
- Playing career: 2019–present

Joel Hofer (born July 30, 2000) is a Canadian professional ice hockey player who is a goaltender for the St. Louis Blues of the National Hockey League (NHL). He was drafted by the Blues in the fourth round, 107th overall, in the 2018 NHL entry draft. He made his NHL debut in 2021 with the Blues.

== Early life ==
Hofer was born July 30, 2000, in Winnipeg, and grew up in the Rural Municipality of Headingley. He was not selected by any Western Hockey League (WHL) team in their bantam draft, and instead attended Pursuit of Excellence in the Canadian Sport School Hockey League (CSSHL). In his final season of CSSHL play, Hofer had a 9–5 record with a 2.85 goals against average (GAA) and .915 save percentage (SV%).

== Playing career ==
=== Junior ===
Hofer first played major junior hockey in the Western Hockey League (WHL) with the Swift Current Broncos. He initially served as backup goaltender to Stuart Skinner, and participated in the team's Ed Chynoweth Cup victory in the 2017–18 season. He subsequently emerged as a starting goaltender and was traded to the Portland Winterhawks, where he spent the remainder of his junior career. In the 2019–20 season, his final one with the Winterhawks, Hofer was named to the Western Conference's Second All-Star Team.

=== Professional ===
Following his selection by the St. Louis Blues in the 2018 NHL entry draft, Hofer was signed to a three-year, entry-level contract on March 22, 2019. During the 2021–22 season, Hofer was recalled from AHL affiliate, the Springfield Thunderbirds, and made his NHL debut on November 5, 2021 against the San Jose Sharks, where he tallied an assist in the 5–3 win. Upon making his debut at the age of 21 years, 97 days, he became the youngest goaltender to win his NHL debut with the Blues. While playing with the Thunderbirds during the Calder Cup playoffs, Hofer scored a goal against the Wilkes-Barre/Scranton Penguins on May 12. This was the first instance of an AHL goaltender physically scoring a goal.

Entering his final year of his entry-level contract in 2022–23, Hofer was reassigned to continue his development in the AHL. He enjoyed success with the Thunderbirds, and at the end of the season was named to the league's Second All-Star Team. He played the third-most minutes of any AHL goaltender that season.

On January 3, 2023, Hofer was signed by the Blues to a two-year, one-way contract extension worth $1.55 million.

== International play ==
Medal record

Representing Canada

Ice hockey

World Championships
Gold medal – first place	2023 Finland/Latvia	

World Junior Championships
Gold medal – first place	2020 Czech Republic	

Hofer was invited to make his international debut for Canada with the national junior team after attending the selection camp for the 2020 World Junior Ice Hockey Championships. He was not initially Team Canada's starting goaltender, that position occupied by Nico Daws. After Daws allowed four goals on the first 17 shots of the team's second game of the tournament against Russia, Hofer relieved him midgame. He allowed two goals on 22 shots, and was thereafter given the net. Team Canada went on a deep run to the championship final, a rematch with Russia, where Hofer made 35 saves on 38 shots in Canada's gold medal win. He was given the IIHF directorate award for Best Goaltender of the tournament, as well as named to the events Media All-Star Team.

Following his successful 2022–23 AHL season, Hofer was invited to join the senior national team at the 2023 IIHF World Championship. He made his first appearance on May 17 against Kazakhstan, where he allowed one goal on 17 shots in Team Canada's 5–1 win. He ultimately appeared in two of ten tournament games, managing a .925 save percentage, while Team Canada won the gold medal. The following year, he rejoined the team for the 2024 IIHF World Championship as one of its three goaltenders, alongside Blues teammate Jordan Binnington and former World Junior teammate Daws.

== Career statistics ==
=== Regular season and playoffs ===
			Regular season									Playoffs
Season	Team	League	GP	W	L	OT	MIN	GA	SO	GAA	SV%	GP	W	L	MIN	GA	SO	GAA	SV%
2017–18	Swift Current Broncos	WHL	19	8	3	1	897	39	1	2.61	.914	2	0	0	46	2	0	2.60	.875
2018–19	Swift Current Broncos	WHL	30	6	21	1	1806	121	1	4.02	.904	—	—	—	—	—	—	—	—
2018–19	Portland Winterhawks	WHL	18	9	8	0	1019	54	2	3.18	.911	5	1	4	312	21	0	4.03	.871
2018–19	San Antonio Rampage	AHL	1	0	1	0	58	4	0	4.11	.886	—	—	—	—	—	—	—	—
2019–20	Portland Winterhawks	WHL	48	34	8	5	2839	118	4	2.49	.915	—	—	—	—	—	—	—	—
2020–21	Utica Comets	AHL	10	4	6	0	558	31	2	3.33	.898	—	—	—	—	—	—	—	—
2021–22	Springfield Thunderbirds	AHL	39	18	14	6	2252	111	1	2.96	.905	10	6	4	609	26	1	2.56	.934
2021–22	St. Louis Blues	NHL	2	1	1	0	117	6	0	3.07	.880	—	—	—	—	—	—	—	—
2022–23	Springfield Thunderbirds	AHL	47	27	15	5	2780	116	5	2.50	.921	2	0	2	114	10	0	5.25	.853
2022–23	St. Louis Blues	NHL	6	3	1	1	318	17	0	3.22	.905	—	—	—	—	—	—	—	—
2023–24	St. Louis Blues	NHL	30	15	12	1	1629	71	1	2.62	.914	—	—	—	—	—	—	—	—
2024–25	St. Louis Blues	NHL	31	16	8	3	1679	74	1	2.64	.904	—	—	—	—	—	—	—	—
2025–26	St. Louis Blues	NHL	46	24	13	5	2625	113	6	2.58	.910	—	—	—	—	—	—	—	—
NHL totals			115	59	35	10	6,366	281	8	2.67	.909	—	—	—	—	—	—	—	—

=== International ===
Year	Team	Event	Result	GP	W	L	T	MIN	GA	SO	GAA	SV%
2020	Canada	WJC	1st place, gold medalist(s)	6	5	0	0	338	9	1	1.60	.939
2023	Canada	WC	1st place, gold medalist(s)	2	1	1	0	124	3	0	1.46	.925
2024	Canada	WC	4th	1	1	0	0	60	2	0	2.00	.867
Junior totals				6	5	0	0	338	9	1	1.60	.939
Senior totals				3	2	1	0	184	5	0	1.63	.909

== Awards and honours ==
Award	Year	Ref
WHL
Ed Chynoweth Cup champion	2018	
Western Conference Second All-Star Team	2020	
AHL
Second All-Star Team	2023	
International
World Junior Championships Best Goaltender	2020	
World Junior Championships Media All-Star Team	2020	
