= Nils Höglander =

Swedish ice hockey player (born 2000)

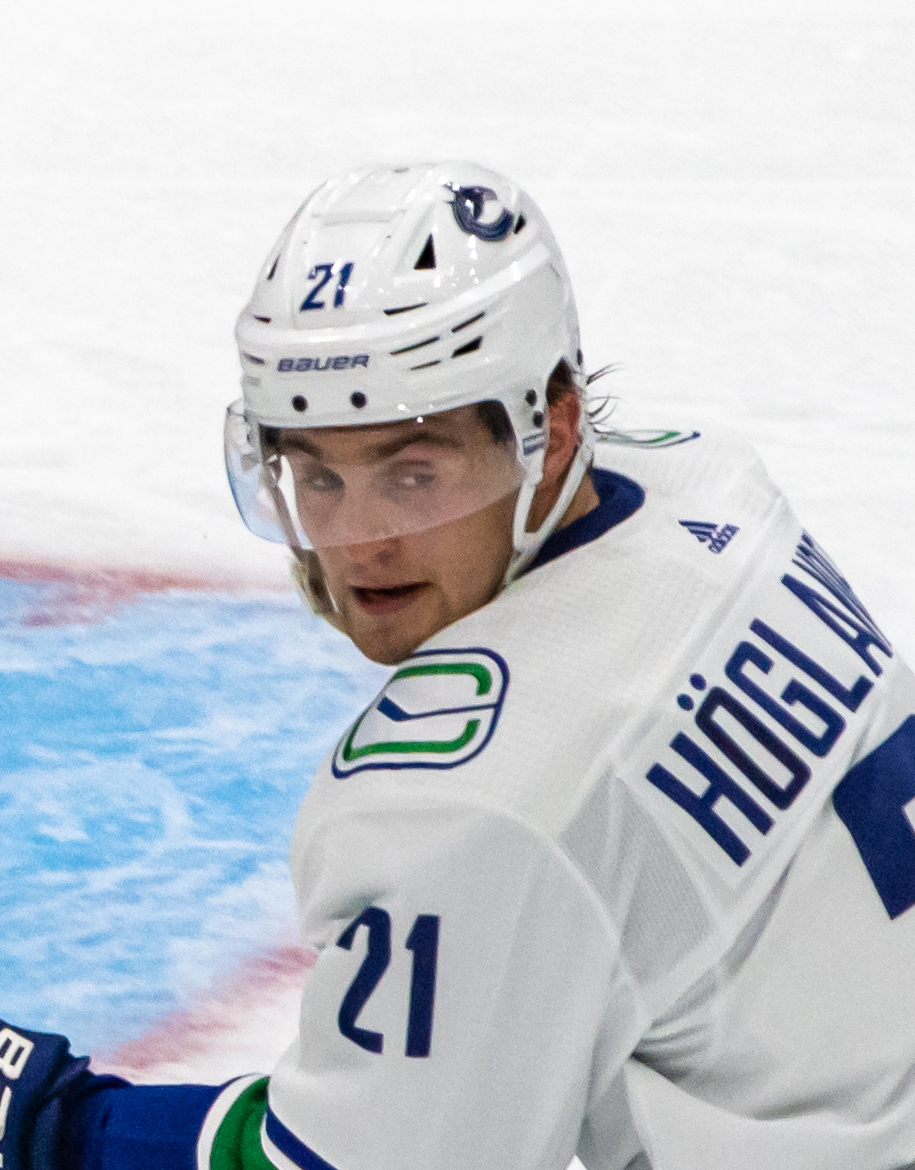
- Höglander with the Vancouver Canucks in 2022
- Born: 20 December 2000 (age 25) Bockträsk, Sweden
- Height: 5 ft 9 in (175 cm)
- Weight: 185 lb (84 kg; 13 st 3 lb)
- Position: Winger
- Shoots: Left
- NHL team Former teams: Nashville Predators; Rögle BK; Vancouver Canucks
- NHL draft: 40th overall, 2019; Vancouver Canucks
- Playing career: 2016–present

Nils Höglander (born 20 December 2000) is a Swedish professional ice hockey player who is a winger for the Nashville Predators of the National Hockey League (NHL). He was selected in the second round, 40th overall, by the Vancouver Canucks in the 2019 NHL entry draft.

== Early life ==
Nils Höglander is from the village of Bockträsk in rural northern Sweden, near the town of Malå. As Bockträsk only had a population of about 20 people, Höglander often played with his older sister, Tilda. He started playing hockey at age three, having learned to skate on Bockträsket lake. As a youth, he played for Malå IF. As he grew up, his family moved to Arvidsjaur, and then Skellefteå, so he and Tilda could play hockey. He did not succeed in tryouts for Skellefteå AIK, and instead played for Clemensnäs HC. In 2012, when Höglander was 11 years old, Tilda died suddenly of a ruptured coronary artery.

In 2015, Höglander played for Timrå IK's U16 and U18 squads. Höglander's future Canucks teammate Elias Pettersson was also at Timrå during this time, though they played in different age groups.

== Playing career ==
From 2016 to 2018, Höglander played in Stockholm for AIK IF of the HockeyAllsvenskan, Sweden's second-highest men's hockey league. In 2018, when he was 17 years old, he moved further south to Ängelholm to play for Rögle BK of the Swedish Hockey League, the top league in Swedish hockey. On 30 April 2020, Höglander signed a three-year, entry-level contract with the Vancouver Canucks. With the 2020–21 North American season delayed due to the COVID-19 pandemic, Höglander was returned to begin the season on loan to Rögle BK until the resumption of NHL training camp in January 2021.

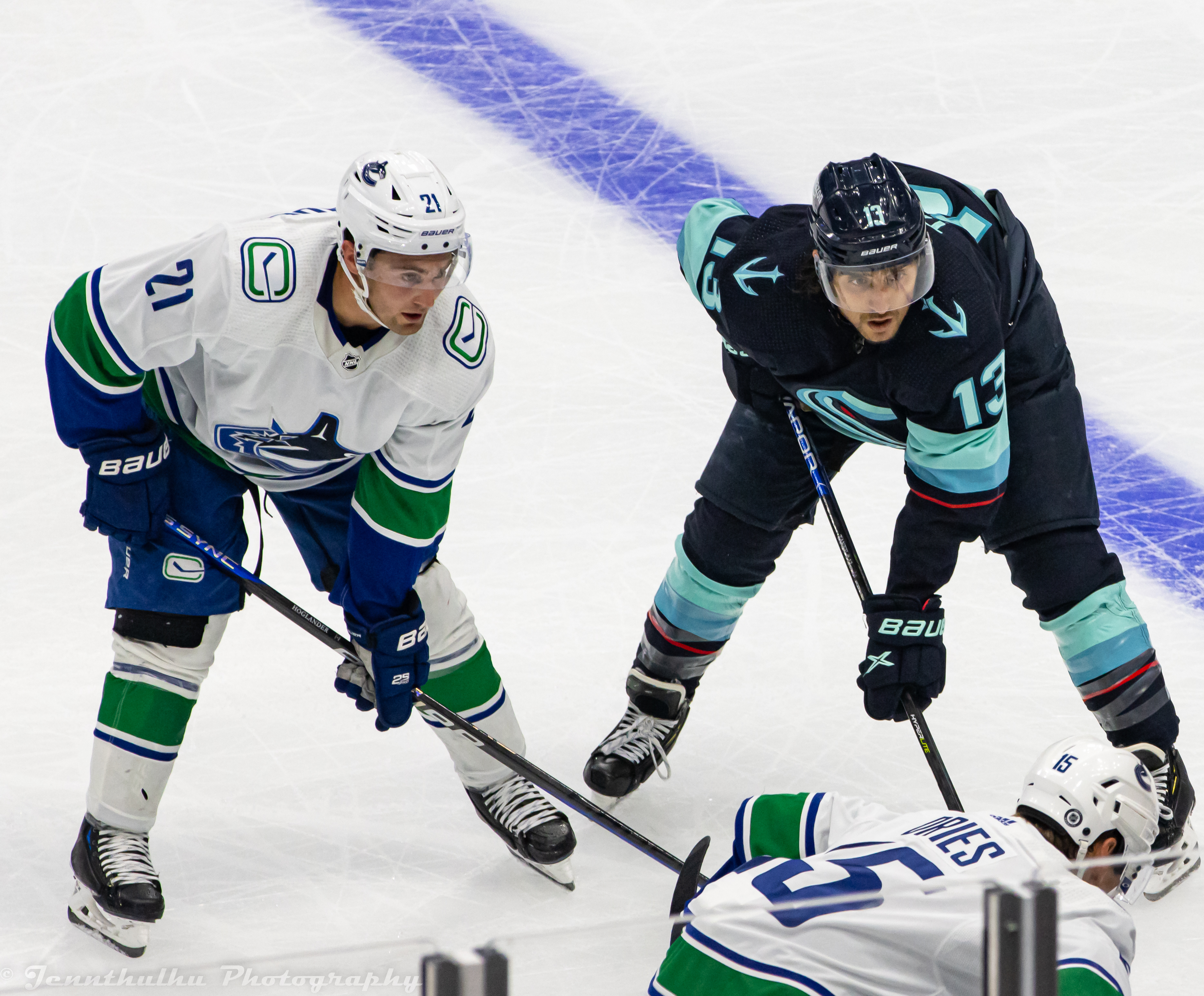
Höglander and Brandon Tanev of the Seattle Kraken in 2022

Höglander made his NHL debut and scored his first NHL goal on 13 January 2021, in the Canucks' season opener against the Edmonton Oilers. On 18 May, Höglander was awarded the Pavel Bure Most Exciting Player Award by Canucks fans.

In the 2022–23 season, Höglander played 25 games with the Canucks, in addition to 45 games with the Canucks' American Hockey League (AHL) affiliate, the Abbotsford Canucks. A restricted free agent, Höglander re-signed with the Canucks on a two-year, $2.2 million contract on 9 July 2023.

Höglander had a successful 2023–24 season, setting a career high in goals (24) and points (36). The Canucks qualified for the Stanley Cup playoffs for the first time in his career, where he had one goal and one assist in 13 games before the Canucks were eliminated by the Edmonton Oilers. On 6 October 2024, Höglander signed a three-year, $9 million contract extension with Vancouver.

On 29 June 2026, Höglander was traded to the Nashville Predators in exchange for a 2029 third-round pick.

== Career statistics ==
=== Regular season and playoffs ===
			Regular season					Playoffs
Season	Team	League	GP	G	A	Pts	PIM	GP	G	A	Pts	PIM
2016–17	AIK	J20	12	2	1	3	18	4	0	1	1	4
2016–17	AIK	Allsv	24	5	3	8	18	3	0	0	0	0
2017–18	AIK	J20	22	14	8	22	53	—	—	—	—	—
2017–18	AIK	Allsv	34	3	4	7	6	5	0	1	1	4
2018–19	Rögle BK	SHL	50	7	7	14	22	2	0	0	0	0
2019–20	Rögle BK	SHL	41	9	7	16	39	—	—	—	—	—
2020–21	Rögle BK	SHL	23	5	9	14	33	—	—	—	—	—
2020–21	Vancouver Canucks	NHL	56	13	14	27	16	—	—	—	—	—
2021–22	Vancouver Canucks	NHL	60	10	8	18	24	—	—	—	—	—
2022–23	Vancouver Canucks	NHL	25	3	6	9	6	—	—	—	—	—
2022–23	Abbotsford Canucks	AHL	45	14	18	32	44	6	3	3	6	18
2023–24	Vancouver Canucks	NHL	80	24	12	36	51	11	1	1	2	2
2024–25	Vancouver Canucks	NHL	72	8	17	25	30	—	—	—	—	—
2025–26	Vancouver Canucks	NHL	38	2	3	5	8	—	—	—	—	—
SHL totals			114	21	23	44	94	2	0	0	0	0
NHL totals			331	60	60	120	135	11	1	1	2	2

=== International ===
Medal record

Men's ice hockey

Representing Sweden

World Junior Championships
Bronze medal – third place	2020 Czech Republic	

World U18 Championships
Bronze medal – third place	2018 Russia	

Year	Team	Event	GP	G	A	Pts	PIM
2016	Sweden	U17	6	0	0	0	18
2018	Sweden	U18	7	0	0	0	2
2020	Sweden	WJC	7	5	6	11	27
Junior totals			20	5	6	11	47
