= 2020 World Junior Ice Hockey Championships =

2020 edition of the World Junior Ice Hockey Championships

2020 IIHF World Junior Championships

Tournament details
- Host country: Czech Republic
- Venue(s): Ostravar Aréna and Werk Arena (in 2 host cities)
- Dates: 26 December 2019 – 5 January 2020
- Teams: 10

Final positions
- Champions: Canada (18th title)
- Runners-up: Russia
- Third place: Sweden
- Fourth place: Finland

Tournament statistics
- Games played: 31
- Goals scored: 202 (6.52 per game)
- Attendance: 173,474 (5,596 per game)
- Scoring leader: (Sweden) Samuel Fagemo (13 points)

Awards
- MVP: (Canada) Alexis Lafrenière

The 2020 World Junior Ice Hockey Championships (2020 WJHC) was the 44th edition of the Ice Hockey World Junior Championship, held from 26 December 2019 to 5 January 2020. Canada defeated Russia 4–3 to win the gold medal and their 18th world junior hockey championship. This marks the fourth time that the Czech Republic hosted the WJHC.

== Background ==
On 16 April 2018, it was announced that Ostrava and Třinec, in the Moravian-Silesian Region would host the tournament. This was the second time Ostrava had been selected to host the competition. The city had also twice co-hosted the senior Ice Hockey World Championships (in 2004 and 2015).

== Top Division ==
=== Venues ===
Ostrava	2020 World Junior Ice Hockey Championships is located in Czech Republic	Třinec
Ostravar Aréna Capacity: 10,004	2020 World Junior Ice Hockey Championships is located in Czech Republic	Werk Arena Capacity: 5,200

=== Match officials ===
The following officials were assigned by the International Ice Hockey Federation to officiate the 2020 World Junior Championships.

Referees

- (Canada) Michael Campbell
- (Russia) Ivan Fateev
- (Sweden) Andreas Harnebring
- (Finland) Lassi Heikkinen
- (Czech Republic) Oldřich Hejduk
- (Canada) Fraser Lawrence
- (United States) Sean MacFarlane
- (Russia) Sergey Morozov
- (Czech Republic) Vladimír Pešina
- (Germany) André Schrader
- (Switzerland) Michael Tscherrig
- (Finland) Kristian Vikman

Linesmen

- (United States) Riley Bowles
- (Finland) Markus Hägerström
- (Canada) Chad Huseby
- (Czech Republic) Vít Lederer
- (Sweden) Ludvig Lundgren
- (Germany) Jonas Merten
- (Sweden) Tobias Nordlander
- (Switzerland) David Obwegeser
- (Russia) Nikita Shalagin
- (Slovakia) Šimon Synek

=== Preliminary round ===
==== Seeding ====
Seeds the preliminary round were based on the 2019 tournament's final standings using the serpentine system. On 6 January 2019, the IIHF announced the groups, with Germany being promoted from Division I A, after having won the 2019 Division I A Tournament.

Group A
Werk Arena

- Finland (1)
- Switzerland (4)
- Sweden (5)
- Slovakia (8)
- Kazakhstan (9)

Group B
Ostravar Aréna

- United States (2)
- Russia (3)
- Canada (6)
- Czech Republic (7)
- Germany (11-Promoted)

==== Group A ====
Pos	Team	Pld	W	OTW	OTL	L	GF	GA	GD	Pts	Qualification
1	Sweden	4	3	1	0	0	20	8	+12	11	Quarterfinals
2	Switzerland	4	3	0	0	1	19	12	+7	9	Quarterfinals
3	Finland	4	2	0	1	1	19	10	+9	7	Quarterfinals
4	Slovakia	4	1	0	0	3	8	22	−14	3	Quarterfinals
5	Kazakhstan	4	0	0	0	4	7	21	−14	0	Relegation round

Source: IIHF
Rules for classification: 1) points; 2) head-to-head points; 3) head-to-head goal difference; 4) head-to-head number of goals scored; 5) result against closest best-ranked team outside tied teams; 6) result against second-best-ranked team outside tied teams; 7) seeding before tournament.

26 December 2019; 15:00	Switzerland	5–3 (2–1, 1–2, 2–0)	Kazakhstan	Werk Arena, Třinec; Attendance: 1,397

Game reference

Luca Hollenstein
Goalies
Vladislav Nurek
Referees:
(Czech Republic) Oldřich Hejduk
(Finland) Kristian Vikman
Linesmen:
(United States) Riley Bowles
(Canada) Chad Huseby

Verboon (Nussbaumer, Moser) – 02:49	1–0
	1–1	15:10 – Musorov (Boiko)
Gerber (Aebischer, Berni) (PP) – 18:51	2–1
	2–2	24:54 – Dyomin (Bondarenko)
Salzgeber (Aebischer) – 30:37	3–2
	3–3	35:39 – Musorov
Wetter (Aebischer, Sopa) – 48:55	4–3
Verboon – 53:54	5–3

8 min
Penalties
6 min
34
Shots
19

26 December 2019; 19:00	Sweden	3–2 OT (0–1, 1–1, 1–0) (OT: 1–0)	Finland	Werk Arena, Třinec; Attendance: 4,471

Game reference

Hugo Alnefelt
Goalies
Justus Annunen
Referees:
(Canada) Michael Campbell
(Russia) Sergey Morozov
Linesmen:
(Germany) Jonas Merten
(Russia) Nikita Shalagin

	0–1	16:21 – Puistola (Honka, Tanus)
Höglander (Fagemo, D. Gustafsson) – 21:05	1–1
	1–2	33:35 – Tanus (Puistola)
Fagemo (Höglander, Söderström) – 54:51	2–2
Holtz (Berggren, Söderström) (PP) – 64:55	3–2

10 min
Penalties
12 min
48
Shots
25

27 December 2019; 15:00	Slovakia	3–1 (0–0, 1–1, 2–0)	Kazakhstan	Werk Arena, Třinec; Attendance: 4,915

Game reference

Samuel Hlavaj
Goalies
Vladislav Nurek
Referees:
(Germany) André Schrader
(Switzerland) Michael Tscherrig
Linesmen:
(Czech Republic) Vít Lederer
(Sweden) Tobias Nordlander

Okuliar (Kňažko, Čajkovič) (PP) – 24:49	1–0
	1–1	29:43 – Musorov (Butenko) (PP)
Tkáč (Mrázik, Vitaloš) – 57:04	2–1
Džugan (Mudrák) (ENG) – 59:53	3–1

24 min
Penalties
20 min
24
Shots
23

28 December 2019; 15:00	Finland	8–1 (2–0, 5–1, 1–0)	Slovakia	Werk Arena, Třinec; Attendance: 4,915

Game reference

Justus Annunen
Goalies
Samuel Vyletelka
Samuel Hlavaj
Referees:
(Russia) Ivan Fateev
(Czech Republic) Oldřich Hejduk
Linesmen:
(United States) Riley Bowles
(Switzerland) David Obwegeser

Puistola (Oden, Tanus) (PP) – 04:52	1–0
Ak. Räty (Aa. Räty, Ranta) – 13:21	2–0
Oden (Puistola, Tanus) (PP) – 27:15	3–0
Aa. Räty (Maccelli, Killinen) – 28:26	4–0
Kokkonen (Ranta) – 33:14	5–0
Erholtz (Thomson, Nousiainen) – 34:51	6–0
	6–1	36:34 – Džugan (Tkáč, Mudrák) (PP)
Ak. Räty (Maccelli, Heinola) – 39:30	7–1
V. Petman (Hatakka) – 52:03	8–1

10 min
Penalties
18 min
40
Shots
26

28 December 2019; 19:00	Switzerland	2–5 (0–2, 1–3, 1–0)	Sweden	Werk Arena, Třinec; Attendance: 4,109

Game reference

Luca Hollenstein
Stéphane Charlin (29:02)
Goalies
Hugo Alnefelt
Referees:
(United States) Sean MacFarlane
(Germany) André Schrader
Linesmen:
(Finland) Markus Hägerström
(Czech Republic) Vít Lederer

	0–1	03:25 – Fagemo (Söderström)
	0–2	09:58 – Fagemo (Höglander)
	0–3	21:28 – Höglander (Lundkvist, Sandin) (PP)
	0–4	29:02 – Henriksson (Raymond, Ginning)
	0–5	34:12 – Raymond (Berggren, Holtz) (PP)
Kohler (Nussbaumer, Moser) (PP) – 39:47	1–5
Gross (Kohler, Verboon) – 54:09	2–5

10 min
Penalties
16 min
27
Shots
27

29 December 2019; 15:00	Kazakhstan	1–7 (1–2, 0–2, 0–3)	Finland	Werk Arena, Třinec; Attendance: 3,012

Game reference

Roman Kalmykov
Goalies
Kari Piiroinen
Referees:
(Canada) Fraser Lawrence
(Czech Republic) Vladimír Pešina
Linesmen:
(Sweden) Ludvig Lundgren
(Russia) Nikita Shalagin

	0–1	06:01 – Puistola (Tanus, Heinola) (PP)
Buyalski (Asukhanov, Dyomin) (PP) – 10:13	1–1
	1–2	14:31 – Tanus (Oden, Puistola)
	1–3	20:54 – Maccelli (Thomson) (PP)
	1–4	32:37 – Aa. Räty (Ak. Räty, Heinola)
	1–5	47:06 – Puistola (Oden)
	1–6	53:49 – Kokkonen (Utunen)
	1–7	57:58 – Nousiainen (Maccelli, Killinen)

10 min
Penalties
18 min
22
Shots
34

30 December 2019; 15:00	Kazakhstan	2–6 (0–1, 1–4, 1–1)	Sweden	Werk Arena, Třinec; Attendance: 2,375

Game reference

Vladislav Nurek
Goalies
Jesper Eliasson
Referees:
(Finland) Lassi Heikkinen
(Czech Republic) Oldrich Hejduk
Linesmen:
(United States) Riley Bowles
(Slovakia) Simon Synek

	0–1	15:12 – Fagemo (Höglander, Sandin)
	0–2	22:37 – Fagemo (Sandin, Lundkvist) (PP)
	0–3	24:08 – Öberg (Nässén)
	0–4	27:40 – Höglander (D. Gustafsson) (PP)
	0–5	30:57 – Berggren (Holtz, Pasic) (PP)
Boiko – 31:38	1–5
	1–6	51:13 – Raymond (Henriksson, Lundkvist)
Musorov (Gaitamirov) – 53:57	2–6

8 min
Penalties
4 min
19
Shots
35

30 December 2019; 19:00	Slovakia	2–7 (0–3, 1–2, 1–2)	Switzerland	Werk Arena, Třinec; Attendance: 4,915

Game reference

Samuel Hlavaj
Samuel Vyletelka (14:49)
Goalies
Luca Hollenstein
Referees:
(Canada) Michael Campbell
(Czech Republic) Vladimír Pešina
Linesmen:
(Czech Republic) Vít Lederer
(Germany) Jonas Merten

	0–1	07:55 – Kohler (Berni, Nussbaumer)
	0–2	10:04 – Kohler (Nussbaumer, Moser) (PP)
	0–3	14:49 – Nussbaumer (Verboon)
	0–4	33:21 – Kank (Jobin)
Faško-Rudáš (Okuliar) (SH) – 38:34	1–4
	1–5	39:55 – Schmid (Aebischer, Verboon)
Džugan (Čajkovič, Mudrák) (PP) – 46:37	2–5
	2–6	50:09 – Henauer (Moser, Nussbaumer) (PP)
	2–7	52:27 – Verboon (Kohler)

12 min
Penalties
14 min
29
Shots
26

31 December 2019; 15:00	Sweden	6–2 (3–0, 2–0, 1–2)	Slovakia	Werk Arena, Třinec; Attendance: 4,154

Game reference

Hugo Alnefelt
Goalies
Samuel Hlavaj
Referees:
(Canada) Fraser Lawrence
(Germany) Andre Schrader
Linesmen:
(Canada) Chad Huseby
(Switzerland) David Obwegeser

Holtz (Söderström, Raymond) – 08:59	1–0
Eriksson (Henriksson, Bäck) – 09:14	2–0
Broberg (Nässén) (SH) – 13:16	3–0
Bäck (Ginning, Berggren) – 25:08	4–0
Holtz (Söderström, Berggren) (PP) – 36:09	5–0
	5–1	45:17 – Kováčik (Okuliar, Stacha) (PP)
	5–2	58:03 – Džugan (Faško-Rudáš)
Fagemo (Höglander) (PP) – 59:44	6–2

14 min
Penalties
20 min
42
Shots
18

31 December 2019; 19:00	Finland	2–5 (1–0, 1–3, 0–2)	Switzerland	Werk Arena, Třinec; Attendance: 1,573

Game reference

Justus Annunen
Goalies
Stéphane Charlin
Referees:
(Sweden) Andreas Harnebring
(Russia) Sergey Morozov
Linesmen:
(Sweden) Ludvig Lundgren
(Sweden) Tobias Nordlander

Honka (Heinola, Tanus) (PP) – 12:49	1–0
	1–1	20:19 – Berri (Schmid)
	1–2	22:18 – Jobin (Aebischer, Patry)
Oden (Thomson, Nousiainen) – 28:33	2–2
	2–3	36:03 – Berri (Wetter, Schmid)
	2–4	50:03 – Knak (Berni, Aebischer)
	2–5	59:48 – Nussbaumer (SH, ENG)

6 min
Penalties
8 min
38
Shots
22

==== Group B ====
Pos	Team	Pld	W	OTW	OTL	L	GF	GA	GD	Pts	Qualification
1	Canada	4	3	0	0	1	17	13	+4	9	Quarterfinals
2	United States	4	2	1	0	1	17	13	+4	8	Quarterfinals
3	Russia	4	2	0	0	2	16	8	+8	6	Quarterfinals
4	Czech Republic (H)	4	1	0	1	2	12	18	−6	4	Quarterfinals
5	Germany	4	1	0	0	3	9	19	−10	3	Relegation round

Source: IIHF
Rules for classification: 1) points; 2) head-to-head points; 3) head-to-head goal difference; 4) head-to-head number of goals scored; 5) result against closest best-ranked team outside tied teams; 6) result against second-best-ranked team outside tied teams; 7) seeding before tournament.
(H) Host

26 December 2019; 15:00	Czech Republic	4–3 (2–2, 2–1, 0–0)	Russia	Ostravar Aréna, Ostrava; Attendance: 8,693

Game reference

Lukáš Dostál
Goalies
Yaroslav Askarov
Amir Miftakhov
Referees:
(Canada) Fraser Lawrence
(United States) Sean MacFarlane
Linesmen:
(Switzerland) David Obwegeser
(Slovakia) Šimon Synek

Kubíček (Jeník, Teplý) (PP) – 02:46	1–0
Myšák (Teplý) – 07:41	2–0
	2–1	10:19 – Zamula (Khovanov, Denisenko)
	2–2	14:32 – Podkolzin (Marchenko, Romanov)
Blümel – 25:31	3–2
	3–3	26:16 – Zamula (Voronkov, Alexandrov)
Jeník (Teplý, Šír) (PP2) – 37:25	4–3

12 min
Penalties
26 min
22
Shots
36

26 December 2019; 19:00	Canada	6–4 (0–2, 3–0, 3–2)	United States	Ostravar Aréna, Ostrava; Attendance: 8,693

Game reference

Nico Daws
Goalies
Spencer Knight
Referees:
(Sweden) Andreas Harneberg
(Finland) Lassi Heikkinen
Linesmen:
(Finland) Markus Hägerström
(Sweden) Ludvig Lundgren

	0–1	03:10 – Pinto (Jones, Brink) (PP)
	0–2	18:32 – Kaliyev (Zegras, Turcotte) (PP)
McMichael (Thomas, Lavoie) – 23:31	1–2
Hayton (Lafrenière) (PP) – 26:34	2–2
Foote (Smith, Cozens) (PP) – 33:03	3–2
Hayton (Lafrenière, Veleno) (PP) – 50:47	4–2
	4–3	52:45 – Robertson (Wahlstrom, Pinto)
	4–4	56:42 – Pinto (Robertson) (PP)
Lafrenière – 56:49	5–4
Dellandrea (Lafrenière) (ENG) – 58:50	6–4

10 min
Penalties
10 min
32
Shots
32

27 December 2019; 19:00	Germany	3–6 (1–2, 2–2, 0–2)	United States	Ostravar Aréna, Ostrava; Attendance: 5,013

Game reference

Tobias Ancicka
Goalies
Dustin Wolf
Referees:
(Russia) Ivan Fateev
(Czech Republic) Vladimír Pešina
Linesmen:
(Russia) Nikita Shalagin
(Slovakia) Šimon Synek

Peterka (Stützle, Bokk) (PP) – 02:32	1–0
	1–1	07:04 – Harris (Zegras, Kaliyev)
	1–2	18:37 – Jones (Zegras, Pinto)
Peterka (Seider, Bokk) (PP) – 22:53	2–2
Bokk (Schütz, Reichel) – 28:36	3–2
	3–3	34:16 – Pinto (Zegras, Miller)
	3–4	38:31 – Hall (Zegras, Pivonka)
	3–5	47:18 – Brink (Robertson, Wahlstrom) (PP)
	3–6	50:51 – Wahlstrom (Pinto)

8 min
Penalties
12 min
20
Shots
29

28 December 2019; 15:00	Czech Republic	3–4 (1–2, 0–1, 2–1)	Germany	Ostravar Aréna, Ostrava; Attendance: 8,693

Game reference

Lukáš Dostál
Goalies
Hendrik Hane
Referees:
(Canada) Michael Campbell
(Finland) Lassi Heikkinen
Linesmen:
(Canada) Chad Huseby
(Sweden) Ludvig Lundgren

	0–1	01:41 – Reichel (Lobach) (PP)
	0–2	07:31 – Peterka (Stützle, Seider)
Haš (Pekař, Pytlík) (PP) – 16:41	1–2
	1–3	33:22 – Bokk (Seider, Jentzsch) (PP2)
	1–4	47:33 – Bokk (Jentzsch, Seider) (PP)
Jeník (Haš) – 49:17	2–4
Zábranský (Haš) (PP2) – 52:30	3–4

38 min
Penalties
32 min
30
Shots
25

28 December 2019; 19:00	Russia	6–0 (3–0, 3–0, 0–0)	Canada	Ostravar Aréna, Ostrava; Attendance: 8,693

Game reference

Amir Miftakhov
Goalies
Nico Daws
Joel Hofer (22:18)
Referees:
(Switzerland) Michael Tscherrig
(Finland) Kristian Vikman
Linesmen:
(Germany) Jonas Merten
(Sweden) Tobias Nordlander

Khovanov – 01:44	1–0
Dorofeyev (Alexandrov, Zhuravlyov) – 10:14	2–0
Rtishchev (Pylenkov, Kruglov) – 13:43	3–0
Alexandrov (Voronkov) – 22:18	4–0
Sokolov (Zamula, Denisenko) – 33:09	5–0
Denisenko (Khovanov, Romanov) – 36:24	6–0

16 min
Penalties
8 min
40
Shots
28

29 December 2019; 19:00	United States	3–1 (0–0, 2–0, 1–1)	Russia	Ostravar Aréna, Ostrava; Attendance: 8,693

Game reference

Spencer Knight
Goalies
Yaroslav Askarov
Amir Miftakhov
Referees:
(Canada) Michael Campbell
(Sweden) Andreas Harnebring
Linesmen:
(Canada) Chad Huseby
(Czech Republic) Vit Lederer

Kaliyev (Zegras, Caufield) (PP) – 36:41	1–0
Robertson (Wahlstrom) – 36:47	2–0
Kaliyev (Zegras, Drury) – 41:20	3–0
	3–1	43:04 – Romanov (Zhuravlyov, Alexandrov)

16 min
Penalties
26 min
24
Shots
26

30 December 2019; 15:00	Germany	1–4 (0–1, 0–2, 1–1)	Canada	Ostravar Aréna, Ostrava; Attendance: 6,102

Game reference

Hendrik Hane
Goalies
Joel Hofer
Referees:
(United States) Sean MacFarlane
(Russia) Sergey Morozov
Linesmen:
(Finland) Markus Hägerström
(Russia) Nikita Shalagin

	0–1	11:50 – Foote (Bahl)
	0–2	32:24 – Foudy (Dellandrea, McIssac)
	0–3	34:01 – Addison (Foote, Cozens) (PP2)
Valenti (Stützle, Schütz) (PP2) – 58:53	1–3
	1–4	59:50 – Dellandrea (Foudy, McIssac) (SH, ENG)

8 min
Penalties
12 min
19
Shots
26

30 December 2019; 19:00	United States	4–3 OT (1–2, 2–0, 0–1) (OT: 1–0)	Czech Republic	Ostravar Aréna, Ostrava; Attendance: 8,693

Game reference

Spencer Knight
Goalies
Lukáš Pařík
Referees:
(Germany) André Schrader
(Finland) Kristian Vikman
Linesmen:
(Sweden) Tobias Nordlander
(Switzerland) David Obwegeser

Pinto (Robertson, Wahlstrom) (PP) – 03:45	1–0
	1–1	09:35 – Zábranský (Klikorka)
	1–2	18:16 – Zábranský (Teplý, Plášek) (PP2)
Kaliyev (Zegras, Miller) – 21:19	2–2
Drury (Zegras, Kaliyev) – 26:01	3–2
	3–3	48:41 – Čajka (Kubíček) (PP)
Caufield (Turcotte) – 63:14	4–3

12 min
Penalties
14 min
43
Shots
29

31 December 2019; 15:00	Russia	6–1 (2–0, 3–0, 1–1)	Germany	Ostravar Aréna, Ostrava; Attendance: 4,628

Game reference

Yaroslav Askarov
Goalies
Hendrik Hane
Tobias Ancicka
Referees:
(Finland) Lassi Heikkinen
(Czech Republic) Oldřich Hejduk
Linesmen:
(Finland) Markus Hägerström
(Slovakia) Šimon Synek

Marchenko (Alexandrov, Morozov) – 06:10	1–0
Marchenko (Podkolzin, Voronkov) – 13:19	2–0
Denisenko (Khovanov) (PP, EA) – 34:19	3–0
Dorofeyev (Marchenko, Romanov) (PP) – 34:59	4–0
Dorofeyev (Marchenko, Romanov) (PP) – 38:40	5–0
Voronkov (Marchenko, Podkolzin) – 40:38	6–0
	6–1	57:43 – Kinder (Mass)

12 min
Penalties
10 min
31
Shots
23

31 December 2019; 19:00	Canada	7–2 (4–0, 2–2, 1–0)	Czech Republic	Ostravar Aréna, Ostrava; Attendance: 8,693

Game reference

Joel Hofer
Goalies
Lukáš Pařík
Nick Malík
Referees:
(Russia) Ivan Fateev
(Switzerland) Michael Tscherrig
Linesmen:
(United States) Riley Bowles
(Germany) Jonas Merten

Veleno (Hayton, Addison) (PP) – 04:41	1–0
Foote (Byram, Smith) (PP) – 09:57	2–0
Hayton (Cozens, Veleno) (PP) – 13:29	3–0
McMichael (Cozens, Hayton) (PP) – 14:30	4–0
	4–1	31:10 – Střondala (Kubíček, Teplý) (PP)
	4–2	31:24 – Zábranský (Myšák, Klikorka)
Foudy (Smith) – 31:34	5–2
Cozens (Addison, Hayton) (PP) – 32:30	6–2
McIsaac (Cozens, Veleno) – 50:00	7–2

8 min
Penalties
39 min
31
Shots
19

=== Relegation ===
2 January 2020; 10:00	Germany	4–0 (0–0, 2–0, 2–0)	Kazakhstan	Ostravar Aréna, Ostrava; Attendance: 1,022

Game reference

Hendrik Hane
Goalies
Vladislav Nurek
Referees:
(Czech Republic) Oldřich Hejduk
(Czech Republic) Vladimír Pešina
Linesmen:
(United States) Riley Bowles
(Finland) Markus Hägerström

Reichel (Peterka, Wirt) – 21:21	1–0
Brune (Valenti, Fleischer) – 31:48	2–0
Peterka (Stützle, Reichel) – 41:09	3–0
Bokk (Seider, Stützle) (PP2) – 51:47	4–0

6 min
Penalties
12 min
35
Shots
23

4 January 2020; 11:00	Kazakhstan	4–1 (1–0, 1–0, 2–1)	Germany	Ostravar Aréna, Ostrava; Attendance: 1,489

Game reference

Vladislav Nurek
Goalies
Hendrik Hane
Referees:
(Czech Republic) Oldřich Hejduk
(Switzerland) Michael Tscherrig
Linesmen:
(United States) Riley Bowles
(Sweden) Tobias Nordlander

Alexandrov (Saiko) – 04:39	1–0
Boiko (Musorov) – 25:05	2–0
Alexandrov (Shaikhmeddenov) – 41:32	3–0
Chaporov (Musorov) (ENG) – 56:27	4–0
	4–1	58:31 – Schinko (Wirt, Kinder)

12 min
Penalties
6 min
22
Shots
44

5 January 2020; 11:00	Germany	6–0 (1–0, 4–0, 1–0)	Kazakhstan	Ostravar Aréna, Ostrava; Attendance: 1,124

Game reference

Hendrik Hane
Goalies
Vladislav Nurek
Referees:
(Russia) Sergey Morozov
(Switzerland) Michael Tscherrig
Linesmen:
(Finland) Markus Hägerström
(Czech Republic) Vít Lederer

Bokk (Jentzsch, Seider) – 12:18	1–0
Bokk (Hüttl, Mik) – 30:12	2–0
Fleischer (Valenti, Schinko) – 31:35	3–0
Reichel (Peterka) – 33:03	4–0
Heinzinger (Jentzsch, Schütz) – 34:27	5–0
Mik (Mass, Schütz) – 55:45	6–0

20 min
Penalties
2 min
40
Shots
27

Note: Kazakhstan was relegated to the 2022 Division I A

=== Playoff round ===
Winning teams were reseeded for the semi-finals in accordance with the following ranking, this was a change the IIHF implemented during their 2019 annual congress. To determine this ranking, the following criteria were used in the order presented:

1. higher position in the group
2. higher number of points
3. better goal difference
4. higher number of goals scored for
5. better seeding coming into the tournament (final placement at the 2019 World Junior Ice Hockey Championships).

Rank	Team	Group	Pos	GP	Pts	GD	GF	Seed
1	Sweden	A	1	4	11	+12	20	5
2	Canada	B	1	4	9	+4	17	6
3	Switzerland	A	2	4	9	+7	19	4
4	United States	B	2	4	8	+4	17	2
5	Finland	A	3	4	7	+9	19	1
6	Russia	B	3	4	6	+8	16	3
7	Czech Republic	B	4	4	4	−6	12	7
8	Slovakia	A	4	4	3	−14	8	8

==== Bracket ====
Quarterfinals
2 January – Ostravar Aréna
1B Canada	6
4A Slovakia	1
2 January – Werk Arena
2B United States	0
3A Finland	1
2 January – Ostravar Aréna
1A Sweden	5
4B Czech Republic	0
2 January – Werk Arena
2A Switzerland	1
3B Russia	3

Semifinals
4 January – Ostravar Aréna
2 Canada	5
5 Finland	0
4 January – Ostravar Aréna
1 Sweden	4
6 Russia (OT)	5

Final
5 January – Ostravar Aréna
2 Canada	4
6 Russia	3
Third place
5 January – Ostravar Aréna
1 Sweden	3
5 Finland	2

==== Quarterfinals ====
2 January 2020; 12:30	Switzerland	1–3 (0–0, 1–3, 0–0)	Russia	Werk Arena, Třinec; Attendance: 3,158

Game reference

Luca Hollenstein
Goalies
Yaroslav Askarov
Referees:
(Canada) Michael Campbell
(Finland) Lassi Heikkinen
Linesmen:
(Czech Republic) Vít Lederer
(Sweden) Tobias Nordlander

	0–1	21:12 – Voronkov (Denisenko, Alexandrov) (PP)
Jobin (Salzgeber) – 27:08	1–1
	1–2	34:07 – Khovanov (Denisenko)
	1–3	38:13 – Voronkov (Khovanov, Zamula) (PP)

14 min
Penalties
10 min
15
Shots
36

2 January 2020; 15:00	Canada	6–1 (1–0, 4–0, 1–1)	Slovakia	Ostravar Aréna, Ostrava; Attendance: 7,074

Game reference

Joel Hofer
Goalies
Samuel Hlavaj
Samuel Vyletelka
Referees:
(United States) Sean MacFarlane
(Switzerland) Michael Tscherrig
Linesmen:
(Germany) Jonas Merten
(Switzerland) David Obwegeser

Hayton (Lafrenière, Cozens) – 06:47	1–0
McMichael (Veleno) – 21:21	2–0
Bernard-Docker (Drysdale, Cozens) – 23:42	3–0
Foudy (Dellandrea, Drysdale) – 29:02	4–0
Lafrenière (Addison, Hayton) (PP) – 30:50	5–0
Hayton (Addison) (PP) – 41:00	6–0
	6–1	46:10 – Okuliar (Kováčik)

37 min
Penalties
32 min
44
Shots
18

2 January 2020; 17:30	United States	0–1 (0–0, 0–0, 0–1)	Finland	Werk Arena, Třinec; Attendance: 4,451

Game reference
Spencer Knight	Goalies	Justus Annunen	Referees: (Russia) Ivan Fateev (Sweden) Andreas Harnebring; Linesmen: (Sweden) Ludvig Lundgren (Slovakia) Simon Synek
0–1 / 44:23 – Oden (Tanus, Heinola) (PP)			Referees: (Russia) Ivan Fateev (Sweden) Andreas Harnebring; Linesmen: (Sweden) Ludvig Lundgren (Slovakia) Simon Synek
33 min	Penalties	4 min	Referees: (Russia) Ivan Fateev (Sweden) Andreas Harnebring; Linesmen: (Sweden) Ludvig Lundgren (Slovakia) Simon Synek
30	Shots	29	Referees: (Russia) Ivan Fateev (Sweden) Andreas Harnebring; Linesmen: (Sweden) Ludvig Lundgren (Slovakia) Simon Synek

2 January 2020; 20:00	Sweden	5–0 (2–0, 1–0, 2–0)	Czech Republic	Ostravar Aréna, Ostrava; Attendance: 8,693

Game reference

Hugo Alnefelt
Goalies
Lukáš Dostál
Referees:
(Canada) Fraser Lawrence
(Russia) Sergey Morozov
Linesmen:
(Canada) Chad Huseby
(Russia) Nikita Shalagin

Höglander (Fagemo, Sandin) (PP) – 13:08	1–0
H. Gustafsson (SH) – 15:09	2–0
Höglander (Sandin, Fagemo) – 20:45	3–0
Söderström (PS) – 44:04	4–0
D. Gustafsson (Höglander, Lundkvist) (PP) – 50:44	5–0

2 min
Penalties
35 min
37
Shots
23

==== Semifinals ====
4 January 2020; 15:00	Sweden	4–5 OT (2–3, 1–0, 1–1) (OT: 0–1)	Russia	Ostravar Aréna, Ostrava; Attendance: 8,693

Game reference

Hugo Alnefelt
Goalies
Yaroslav Askarov
Amir Miftakhov
Referees:
(Canada) Fraser Lawrence
(Finland) Kristian Vikman
Linesmen:
(Finland) Markus Hagerstrom
(Canada) Chad Huseby

Sandin (D. Gustafsson) – 00:16	1–0
	1–1	03:04 – Morozov (Podkolzin, Dorofeyev) (PP)
	1–2	05:40 – Khovanov (Alexandrov, Denisenko) (PP)
	1–3	12:05 – Sokolov
Fagemo (Lundkvist, Sandin) (PP) – 14:54	2–3
Sandin (Fagemo, Nässén) (PP) – 31:02	3–3
Lundkvist (Sandin, Nässén) (PP) – 44:25	4–3
	4–4	48:35 – Sokolov (Khovanov)
	4–5	63:24 – Morozov (Podkolzin, Voronkov)

35 min
Penalties
18 min
25
Shots
44

4 January 2020; 19:00	Canada	5–0 (4–0, 1–0, 0–0)	Finland	Ostravar Aréna, Ostrava; Attendance: 8,693

Game reference

Joel Hofer
Goalies
Justus Annunen
Referees:
(United States) Sean MacFarlane
(Russia) Sergey Morozov
Linesmen:
(Czech Republic) Vit Lederer
(Switzerland) David Obwegeser

McMichael (Dudas) – 01:48	1–0
Lafrenière (Foote, Hayton) – 03:05	2–0
Drysdale (Lavoie, Byfield) – 03:55	3–0
Dellandrea (Dudas, McMichael) – 14:49	4–0
Lafrenière (Addison, Hayton) (PP) – 37:53	5–0

4 min
Penalties
14 min
39
Shots
32

==== Bronze medal game ====
5 January 2020; 15:00	Sweden	3–2 (1–2, 2–0, 0–0)	Finland	Ostravar Aréna, Ostrava; Attendance: 7,954

Game reference

Hugo Alnefelt
Goalies
Justus Annunen
Referees:
(Canada) Michael Campbell
(Canada) Fraser Lawrence
Linesmen:
(Canada) Chad Huseby
(Russia) Nikita Shalagin

	0–1	08:22 – Puistola (Nousiainen, Tanus)
Sandin (Lundkvist, Fagemo) (PP) – 12:08	1–1
	1–2	19:00 – Maccelli
Fagemo (Höglander, Ginning) – 30:34	2–2
Öberg (Nässén) – 33:19	3–2

10 min
Penalties
16 min
26
Shots
34

==== Gold medal game ====
5 January 2020; 19:00	Canada	4–3 (0–0, 1–2, 3–1)	Russia	Ostravar Aréna, Ostrava; Attendance: 8,692

Game reference

Joel Hofer
Goalies
Amir Miftakhov
Referees:
(Finland) Lassi Heikkinen
(Finland) Kristian Vikman
Linesmen:
(Sweden) Ludvig Lundgren
(Slovakia) Simon Synek

	0–1	29:37 – Alexandrov (Zamula, Denisenko) (PP)
Cozens (Veleno, Lafrenière) (PP2) – 31:01	1–1
	1–2	34:46 – Denisenko (Romanov, Sokolov)
	1–3	48:46 – Sorkin (Kruglov, Rtishev)
McMichael (Addison, Byram) – 49:20	2–3
Hayton (Addison, Lafrenière) (PP) – 51:21	3–3
Thomas (McMichael, Addison) – 56:02	4–3

12 min
Penalties
16 min
30
Shots
38

=== Statistics ===
==== Scoring leaders ====
Pos	Player	Country	GP	G	A	Pts	+/−	PIM
1	Samuel Fagemo	Sweden	7	8	5	13	+3	6
2	Barrett Hayton	Canada	7	6	6	12	+1	6
3	Nils Höglander	Sweden	7	5	6	11	+6	27
4	Alexis Lafrenière	Canada	5	4	6	10	+3	4
5	Rasmus Sandin	Sweden	7	3	7	10	+3	6
6	Grigori Denisenko	Russia	7	3	6	9	+4	8
7	Dylan Cozens	Canada	7	2	7	9	+6	4
7	Kristian Tanus	Finland	7	2	7	9	+4	0
9	Calen Addison	Canada	7	1	8	9	+4	0
10	Trevor Zegras	United States	5	0	9	9	+6	4

GP = Games played; G = Goals; A = Assists; Pts = Points; +/− = Plus–minus; PIM = Penalties In Minutes
Source: IIHF

==== Goaltending leaders ====
(minimum 40% team's total ice time)

Pos	Player	Country	TOI	GA	GAA	SA	Sv%	SO
1	Joel Hofer	Canada	337:42	9	1.60	148	93.92	1
2	Hugo Alnefelt	Sweden	368:19	13	2.12	171	92.40	1
3	Amir Miftakhov	Russia	197:50	7	2.12	86	91.86	1
4	Justus Annunen	Finland	362:01	16	2.65	190	91.58	1
5	Spencer Knight	United States	241:26	10	2.49	115	91.30	0

TOI = Time on ice (minutes:seconds); GA = Goals against; GAA = Goals against average; SA = Shots against; Sv% = Save percentage; SO = Shutouts
Source: IIHF

=== Awards ===
- Best players selected by the directorate:
  - Best Goaltender: (Canada) Joel Hofer
  - Best Defenceman: (Sweden) Rasmus Sandin
  - Best Forward: (Canada) Alexis Lafrenière

Source: IIHF

- Media All-Stars:
  - MVP: (Canada) Alexis Lafrenière
  - Goaltender: (Canada) Joel Hofer
  - Defencemen: (Sweden) Rasmus Sandin / (Russia) Alexander Romanov
  - Forwards: (Sweden) Samuel Fagemo / (Canada) Barrett Hayton / (Canada) Alexis Lafrenière

Source: IIHF

=== Final standings ===
Pos	Grp	Team	Pld	W	OTW	OTL	L	GF	GA	GD	Pts	Final result
1	B	Canada	7	6	0	0	1	32	17	+15	18	Champions
2	B	Russia	7	3	1	0	3	27	17	+10	11	Runners-up
3	A	Sweden	7	5	1	1	0	32	15	+17	18	Third place
4	A	Finland	7	3	0	1	3	22	18	+4	10	Fourth place
5	A	Switzerland	5	3	0	0	2	20	15	+5	9	Eliminated in Quarter-finals
6	B	United States	5	2	1	0	2	17	14	+3	8	Eliminated in Quarter-finals
7	B	Czech Republic (H)	5	1	0	1	3	12	23	−11	4	Eliminated in Quarter-finals
8	A	Slovakia	5	1	0	0	4	9	28	−19	3	Eliminated in Quarter-finals
9	B	Germany	7	3	0	0	4	20	23	−3	9	Avoided relegation
10	A	Kazakhstan	7	1	0	0	6	11	32	−21	3	Relegated to the 2022 Division I A

Source: IIHF
(H) Host

== Division I ==
=== Group A ===
The Division I Group A tournament was played in Minsk, Belarus, from 9 to 15 December 2019.

Pos	Team	Pld	W	OTW	OTL	L	GF	GA	GD	Pts	Promotion or relegation
1	Austria	5	4	0	0	1	18	10	+8	12	Promoted to the 2021 Top Division
2	Latvia	5	3	1	0	1	18	5	+13	11 (Note: Latvia 3–2 (OT) Belarus)	
3	Belarus (H)	5	3	0	2	0	19	12	+7	11	
4	Norway	5	1	2	0	2	12	11	+1	7	
5	Denmark	5	0	1	1	3	6	16	−10	3	
6	Slovenia	5	0	0	1	4	6	25	−19	1	Relegated to the 2022 Division I B

Source: IIHF
Rules for classification: 1) points; 2) head-to-head points; 3) head-to-head goal difference; 4) head-to-head number of goals scored; 5) result against closest best-ranked team outside tied teams; 6) result against second-best-ranked team outside tied teams; 7) seeding before tournament.
(H) Host

=== Group B ===
The Division I Group B tournament was played in Kyiv, Ukraine, from 12 to 18 December 2019.

Pos	Team	Pld	W	OTW	OTL	L	GF	GA	GD	Pts	Promotion or relegation
1	Hungary	5	5	0	0	0	29	16	+13	15	Promoted to the 2022 Division I A
2	France	5	4	0	0	1	22	7	+15	12	
3	Ukraine (H)	5	2	1	0	2	14	12	+2	8	
4	Poland	5	2	0	0	3	29	26	+3	6	
5	Estonia	5	1	0	0	4	14	27	−13	3	
6	Italy	5	0	0	1	4	13	33	−20	1	Relegated to the 2022 Division II A

Source: IIHF
Rules for classification: 1) points; 2) head-to-head points; 3) head-to-head goal difference; 4) head-to-head number of goals scored; 5) result against closest best-ranked team outside tied teams; 6) result against second-best-ranked team outside tied teams; 7) seeding before tournament.
(H) Host

== Division II ==
=== Group A ===
The Division II Group A tournament was played in Vilnius, Lithuania, from 6 to 12 January 2020.

Pos	Team	Pld	W	OTW	OTL	L	GF	GA	GD	Pts	Promotion or relegation
1	Japan	5	5	0	0	0	37	7	+30	15	Promoted to the 2022 Division I B
2	Great Britain	5	3	1	0	1	23	17	+6	11	
3	Lithuania (H)	5	3	0	0	2	20	17	+3	9	
4	Romania	5	2	0	0	3	15	24	−9	6	
5	Spain	5	1	0	1	3	8	23	−15	4	
6	Serbia	5	0	0	0	5	11	26	−15	0	Relegated to the 2022 Division II B

Source: IIHF
Rules for classification: 1) points; 2) head-to-head points; 3) head-to-head goal difference; 4) head-to-head number of goals scored; 5) result against closest best-ranked team outside tied teams; 6) result against second-best-ranked team outside tied teams; 7) seeding before tournament.
(H) Host

=== Group B ===
The Division II Group B tournament was played in Gangneung, South Korea, from 27 January to 3 February 2020.

Pos	Team	Pld	W	OTW	OTL	L	GF	GA	GD	Pts	Promotion or relegation
1	South Korea (H)	5	5	0	0	0	20	6	+14	15	Promoted to the 2022 Division II A
2	Netherlands	5	3	0	0	2	30	13	+17	9 (Note: Netherlands 3 Pts, +3 GD; China 3 Pts, –1 GD; Croatia 3 Pts, –2 GD)	
3	China	5	3	0	0	2	22	10	+12	9	
4	Croatia	5	3	0	0	2	31	17	+14	9	
5	Belgium	5	1	0	0	4	15	25	−10	3	
6	Israel	5	0	0	0	5	3	50	−47	0	Relegated to the 2022 Division III

Source: IIHF
Rules for classification: 1) points; 2) head-to-head points; 3) head-to-head goal difference; 4) head-to-head number of goals scored; 5) result against closest best-ranked team outside tied teams; 6) result against second-best-ranked team outside tied teams; 7) seeding before tournament.
(H) Host

== Division III ==
The Division III tournament was played in Sofia, Bulgaria, from 13 to 19 January 2020.

=== Playoffs ===
Semifinals
18 January
Iceland	5
Turkey	2
18 January
Australia	8
Mexico	3

Final
19 January
Iceland	4
Australia	1
3rd place match
19 January
Turkey	4
Mexico	2

5th–8th place semifinals
18 January
Bulgaria	8
Chinese Taipei	1
18 January
South Africa	1
New Zealand	2

5th place match
19 January
Bulgaria	6
New Zealand	1
7th place match
19 January
South Africa	4
Chinese Taipei (OT)	5
