= Egor Zamula =

Russian ice hockey player (born 2000)

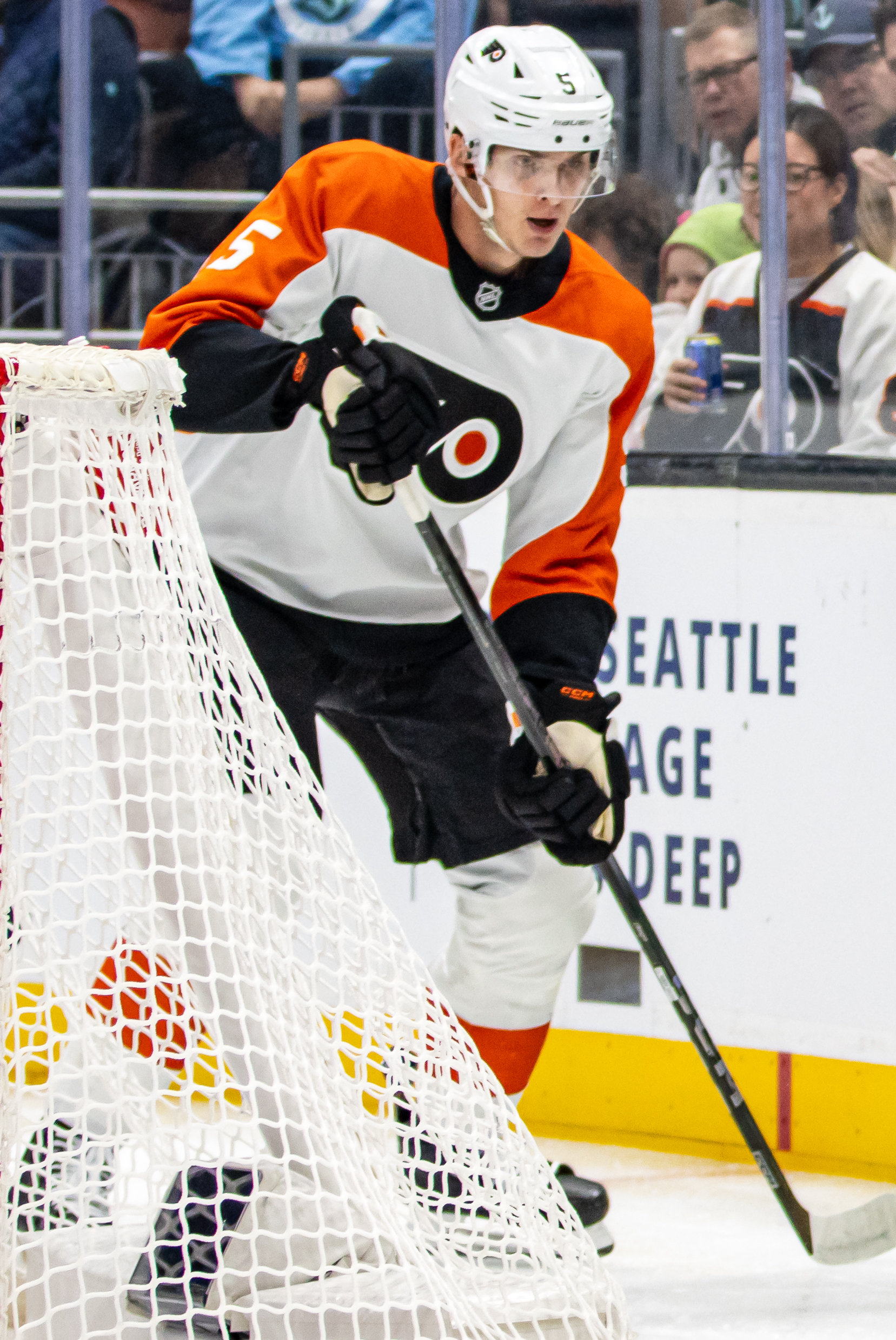
- Zamula playing for the Philadelphia Flyers in 2024
- Born: 30 March 2000 (age 26) Chelyabinsk, Russia
- Height: 191 cm (6 ft 3 in)
- Weight: 80 kg (176 lb; 12 st 8 lb)
- Position: Defence
- Shoots: Left
- KHL team Former teams: CSKA Moscow; Philadelphia Flyers; Columbus Blue Jackets
- NHL draft: Undrafted
- Playing career: 2021–present

Egor Denisovich Zamula (Russian: Егор Денисович Замула; born 30 March 2000) is a Russian professional ice hockey player who is a defenceman for HC CSKA Moscow of the Kontinental Hockey League (KHL).

== Early life ==
Zamula began playing ice hockey at the age of two, and says that his favourite player as a child was Victor Hedman.

== Playing career ==
=== Amateur ===
The Regina Pats of the Western Hockey League (WHL) selected Zamula 60th overall in the CHL Import Draft. After 38 games with the Pats, Zamula was placed on waivers, where he was claimed by the Calgary Hitmen.

=== Professional ===
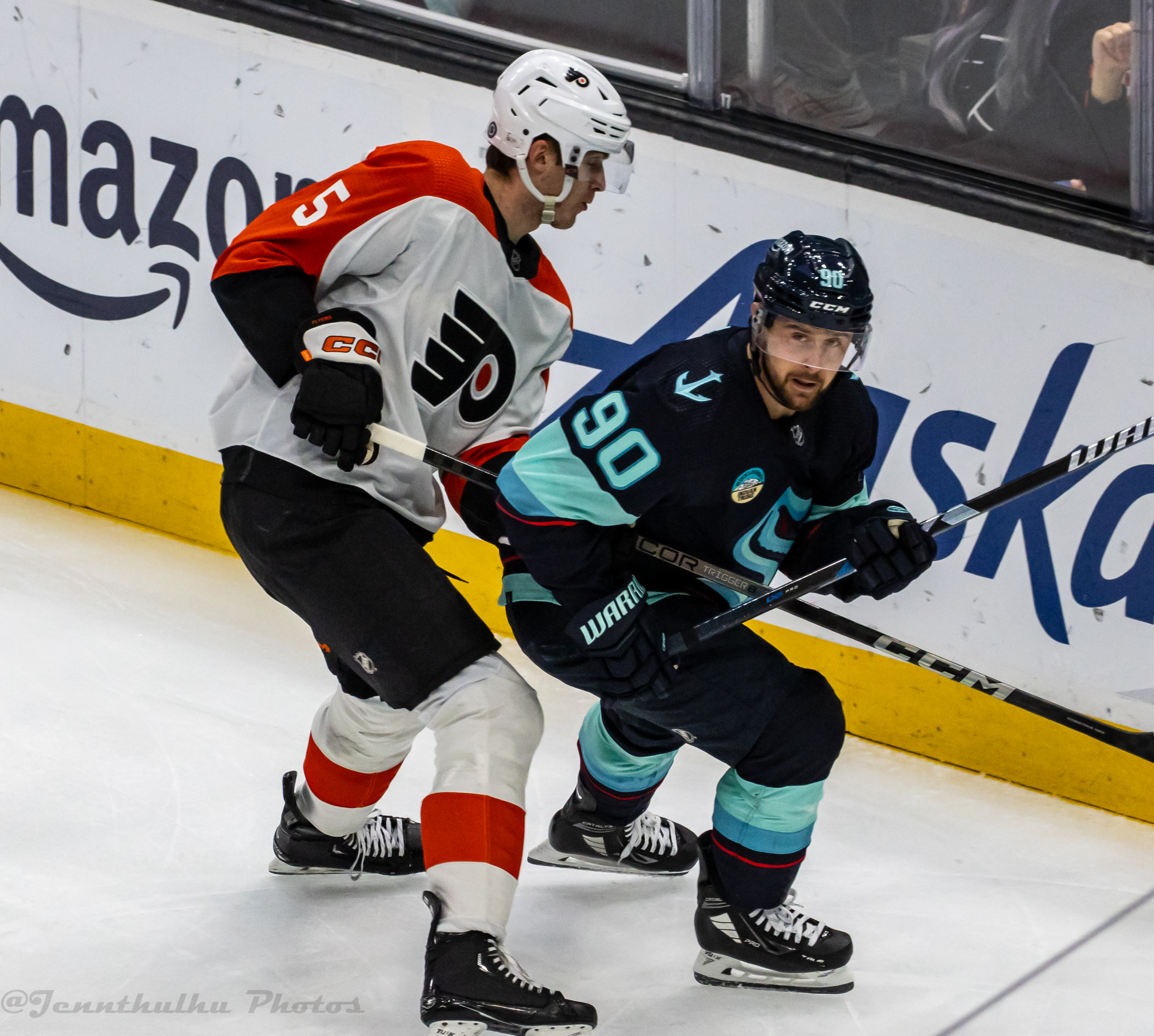
Zamula battles for position against Tomáš Tatar of the Seattle Kraken in 2023.

Zamula made his NHL debut with the Flyers on 27 April 2021, playing on a defensive line with Travis Sanheim in a game against the New Jersey Devils. He became the fifth Flyer to debut during the 2020–21 NHL season, following Maksim Sushko, Tanner Laczynski, Wade Allison, and Jackson Cates.

Entering his sixth season within the Flyers organization in 2025–26, Zamula registered one assist through 13 appearances before he was demoted and re-assigned to the Lehigh Valley Phantoms of the American Hockey League (AHL). Following three games with Lehigh Valley, Zamula was traded by the Flyers to the Pittsburgh Penguins in exchange for Philip Tomasino on 31 December 2025. Remaining in the AHL, Zamula was immediately re-assigned to the Wilkes-Barre/Scranton Penguins of the AHL. However, Zamula failed to report to Wilkes-Barre/Scranton, and he was suspended by the Penguins on 4 January 2026; The following day, the Penguins placed him on waivers to terminate his contract. After clearing waivers and having his contract terminated, he signed a one-year contract with the Columbus Blue Jackets for the remainder of the season on 6 January.

As a pending restricted free agent, Zamula was not tendered a qualifying offer by the Blue Jackets, releasing him to free agency. On 1 July 2026, Zamula opted to return to his native Russia, agreeing to a three-year contract with HC CSKA Moscow of the KHL.

== International play ==
Medal record

Men's ice hockey

Representing Russia

World Junior Championships
Silver medal – second place	2020 Czech Republic	

Zamula represented Russia at the 2020 World Junior Ice Hockey Championships, where he averaged 22:23 of ice time per game, the most of any player for Russia, Canada, the US, Sweden, or Finland. He scored 2 goals and 3 assists in 7 games with Russia, who eventually lost the gold medal match to Canada.

== Career statistics ==
=== Regular season and playoffs ===
			Regular season					Playoffs
Season	Team	League	GP	G	A	Pts	PIM	GP	G	A	Pts	PIM
2017–18	Regina Pats	WHL	38	0	7	7	14	—	—	—	—	—
2017–18	Calgary Hitmen	WHL	31	2	9	11	24	—	—	—	—	—
2018–19	Calgary Hitmen	WHL	61	10	46	56	27	11	0	7	7	4
2019–20	Calgary Hitmen	WHL	28	7	21	28	14	—	—	—	—	—
2020–21	Lehigh Valley Phantoms	AHL	25	0	6	6	8	—	—	—	—	—
2020–21	Philadelphia Flyers	NHL	2	0	0	0	0	—	—	—	—	—
2021–22	Lehigh Valley Phantoms	AHL	58	4	25	29	16	—	—	—	—	—
2021–22	Philadelphia Flyers	NHL	10	0	0	0	4	—	—	—	—	—
2022–23	Philadelphia Flyers	NHL	14	0	4	4	2	—	—	—	—	—
2022–23	Lehigh Valley Phantoms	AHL	44	1	18	19	14	—	—	—	—	—
2023–24	Philadelphia Flyers	NHL	66	5	16	21	32	—	—	—	—	—
2024–25	Philadelphia Flyers	NHL	63	3	12	15	6	—	—	—	—	—
2025–26	Philadelphia Flyers	NHL	13	0	1	1	4	—	—	—	—	—
2025–26	Lehigh Valley Phantoms	AHL	3	0	2	2	0	—	—	—	—	—
2025–26	Columbus Blue Jackets	NHL	20	0	2	2	0	—	—	—	—	—
NHL totals			188	8	35	43	48	—	—	—	—	—

=== International ===
Year	Team	Event	Result	GP	G	A	Pts	PIM
2018	Russia	U18	6th	5	1	1	2	4
2020	Russia	WJC	2nd place, silver medalist(s)	7	2	3	5	6
Junior totals				12	3	4	7	10
