= Linus Nässén (ice hockey, born 2000) =

Swedish ice hockey player

- Born: May 17, 2000 (age 24); Hönö, Sweden
- Height: 181 cm (5 ft 11 in)
- Weight: 81 kg (179 lb; 12 st 11 lb)
- Position: Forward
- Shoots: Left
- SHL team: Frölunda HC
- Playing career: 2018–present

Linus Nässén (born May 17, 2000) is a Swedish professional ice hockey forward current playing for Frölunda HC of the Swedish Hockey League (SHL).

== Playing career ==
Nässén started playing as a youth for Skärgårdens SK, before moving to join the Frölunda HC junior academy in 2014. Nässén represented Gothenburg at TV-pucken in 2014, having one assist in six games as an underage player he helped Gothenburg win a silver medal at the tournament. At the 2015 TV-pucken he scored two goals and two assist in six games but Gothenburg were eliminated in the quarterfinals.

He made his professional debut for Frölunda in the Swedish Hockey League during the 2018–19 season, and was praised as a future cornerstone of the team by coach Roger Rönnberg.

== International play ==
Medal record

Representing Sweden

Ice hockey

World Junior Championships
Bronze medal – third place	2020 Czech Republic	

World U18 Championships
Bronze medal – third place	2018 Russia	

Hlinka Gretzky Cup
Bronze medal – third place	2017 Czech Republic	

World U-17 Hockey Challenge
Gold medal – first place	2016 Canada	

Nässén represented Sweden U17 at the 2016 World U-17 Hockey Challenge, scoring one goal and one assist in six games helping Sweden win the gold. Nässén represented Sweden U18 at the 2017 Ivan Hlinka Memorial Tournament where Sweden won a bronze medal. He also competed for Sweden at the 2018 IIHF World U18 Championships, where Sweden again claimed the bronze medal. Nässén was part of the Swedish U20 team that won a bronze medal at the 2020 World Junior Ice Hockey Championships, recording five assist in seven games.

== Career statistics ==
=== Regular season and playoffs ===
			Regular season					Playoffs
Season	Team	League	GP	G	A	Pts	PIM	GP	G	A	Pts	PIM
2016–17	Frölunda HC	J20	2	0	0	0	2	—	—	—	—	—
2017–18	Frölunda HC	J20	28	3	8	11	16	5	0	2	2	2
2018-19	Frölunda HC	J20	16	8	9	17	6	6	1	2	3	4
2018–19	Frölunda HC	SHL	27	2	1	3	0	6	0	0	0	0
2019–20	Timrå IK	Allsv	21	5	8	13	8	1	0	1	1	0
2020–21	Frölunda HC	SHL	46	3	6	9	4	7	0	1	1	2
2021–22	Frölunda HC	SHL	36	4	2	6	14	7	0	0	0	0
2022–23	Frölunda HC	SHL	43	3	5	8	4	13	2	1	3	2
2023–24	Frölunda HC	SHL	51	4	15	19	12	13	1	3	4	4
SHL totals			203	16	29	45	34	46	3	5	8	8

=== International ===
Year	Team	Event	Result	GP	G	A	Pts	PIM
2016	Sweden U17	WHC-17	1st place, gold medalist(s)	6	1	1	2	0
2017	Sweden U18	HG18	3rd place, bronze medalist(s)	5	0	0	0	0
2018	Sweden U18	U18	3rd place, bronze medalist(s)	7	0	1	1	6
2020	Sweden U20	WJC	3rd place, bronze medalist(s)	7	0	5	5	2
Junior totals				54	7	10	17	20
