= Alex Kannok-Leipert =

Canadian-Thai ice hockey player

- Born: July 20, 2000 (age 25) Nakhon Ratchasima, Thailand
- Height: 6 ft 0 in (183 cm)
- Weight: 201 lb (91 kg; 14 st 5 lb)
- Position: Defence
- Shoots: Right
- AHL team Former teams: Grand Rapids Griffins; Abbotsford Canucks; Bakersfield Condors
- NHL draft: 161st overall, 2018; Washington Capitals
- Playing career: 2021–present

Alex Kannok-Leipert (born July 20, 2000) is a Canadian-Thai professional ice hockey defenceman who currently plays for the Grand Rapids Griffins in the American Hockey League (AHL). Born in Nakhon Ratchasima, Thailand to a Thai mother and Canadian father, Kannok-Leipert is the first Thai-born NHL draft pick.

== Playing career ==
Kannok-Leipert played major junior hockey with the Vancouver Giants in the Western Hockey League (WHL) before he was selected in the sixth-round, 161st overall by the Washington Capitals in the 2018 NHL entry draft.

Un-signed by the Capitals, Kannok-Leipert embarked on his professional career after he was signed by the Abbotsford Canucks of the AHL, the primary affiliate to the Vancouver Canucks on August 17, 2021.

After three seasons with Abbotsford, Kannok-Leipert continued his carer in the AHL agreeing to a one-year contract with the Bakersfield Condors, affiliate to the Edmonton Oilers, on July 1, 2024. In the 2024–25 season with the Condors, Kannok-Leipert posted a career best 4 goals and 11 points through 59 regular season appearances.

As a free agent from the Condors, Kannok-Leipert joined his third AHL outfit, after agreeing to a one-year contract with the Grand Rapids Griffins, affiliate to the Detroit Red Wings, on July 11, 2025. In the 2025–26 season, Kannok-Leipert posted 9 points from the blueline in 39 games with Grand Rapids. He was signed to a one-year contract extension on February 3, 2026.

== Career statistics ==
			Regular season					Playoffs
Season	Team	League	GP	G	A	Pts	PIM	GP	G	A	Pts	PIM
2015–16	Regina Pat Canadians	SMAAAHL	44	3	10	13	28	2	0	0	0	0
2016–17	Regina Pat Canadians	SMAAAHL	44	10	25	35	54	11	1	10	11	12
2016–17	Vancouver Giants	WHL	8	1	2	3	6	—	—	—	—	—
2017–18	Vancouver Giants	WHL	60	5	16	21	52	6	0	0	0	0
2018–19	Vancouver Giants	WHL	67	5	14	19	93	22	2	10	12	14
2019–20	Vancouver Giants	WHL	62	3	19	22	60	—	—	—	—	—
2020–21	Vancouver Giants	WHL	22	7	11	18	29	—	—	—	—	—
2021–22	Abbotsford Canucks	AHL	41	1	4	5	32	—	—	—	—	—
2022–23	Abbotsford Canucks	AHL	44	0	4	4	68	2	0	1	1	0
2023–24	Abbotsford Canucks	AHL	38	0	3	3	40	—	—	—	—	—
2024–25	Bakersfield Condors	AHL	59	4	7	11	93	—	—	—	—	—
2025–26	Grand Rapids Griffins	AHL	64	2	14	16	51	—	—	—	—	—
AHL totals			246	7	32	39	284	2	0	1	1	0
