= 2018 NHL entry draft =

2018 North American ice hockey draft

General information
- Date: June 22–23, 2018
- Location: American Airlines Center; Dallas, Texas, U.S.
- Networks: Sportsnet (Canada); NBCSN (United States)

Overview
- 217 total selections in 7 rounds
- First selection: (Sweden) Rasmus Dahlin (Buffalo Sabres)

The 2018 NHL entry draft was the 56th draft for the National Hockey League. It was held on June 22–23, 2018, at the American Airlines Center in Dallas.

The 2018 NHL entry draft was the second of two professional sports drafts to be held in the Dallas–Fort Worth metroplex during the calendar year, as the Dallas Cowboys hosted the 2018 NFL draft in April.

The first three selections were Rasmus Dahlin by the Buffalo Sabres, Andrei Svechnikov by the Carolina Hurricanes, and Jesperi Kotkaniemi by the Montreal Canadiens.

The 2018 draft featured both the first player trained in the United Kingdom to be drafted in Liam Kirk, and the first Jamaican-born player drafted in Jermaine Loewen.

As of 2026, there are 57 active NHL players from this draft.

== Eligibility ==
Ice hockey players that were born between January 1, 1998, and September 15, 2000, were eligible for selection in the 2018 NHL entry draft. Additionally, undrafted, non-North American players born in 1997 were eligible for the draft; and those players who were drafted in the 2016 NHL entry draft, but not signed by an NHL team and who were born after June 30, 1998, were also eligible to re-enter the draft.

== Draft lottery ==
Since the 2012–13 NHL season all teams not qualifying for the Stanley Cup playoffs have a "weighted" chance at winning the first overall selection. Beginning with the 2014–15 NHL season the NHL changed the weighting system that was used in previous years. Under the new system the odds of winning the draft lottery for the four lowest finishing teams in the league decreased, while the odds for the other non-playoff teams increased. The Buffalo Sabres, Carolina Hurricanes and Montreal Canadiens won the lotteries that took place on April 28, 2018, giving them the first, second and third picks overall. The Buffalo Sabres retained the top pick, while Carolina moved up nine spots and Montreal moved up one spot. In the process, the Ottawa Senators and Arizona Coyotes moved down two spots from second and third overall, respectively, while the Detroit Red Wings, Vancouver Canucks, Chicago Blackhawks, New York Rangers, Edmonton Oilers and New York Islanders each dropped one spot.

Indicates team won first overall
Indicates team won second overall
Indicates team won third overall
Indicates teams that did not win a lottery

Complete draft position odds
Team	1st	2nd	3rd	4th	5th	6th	7th	8th	9th	10th	11th	12th	13th	14th	15th
Buffalo	18.5%	16.5%	14.4%	50.6%											
Ottawa	13.5%	13.0%	12.3%	33.3%	27.9%										
Arizona	11.5%	11.3%	11.1%	13.2%	37.7%	15.2%									
Montreal	9.5%	9.6%	9.7%	2.8%	26.1%	34.0%	8.3%								
Detroit	8.5%	8.7%	8.9%		8.4%	34.5%	26.7%	4.3%							
Vancouver	7.5%	7.8%	8.0%			16.3%	38.9%	19.4%	2.1%						
Chicago	6.5%	6.8%	7.1%				26.0%	39.5%	13.1%	1.0%					
NY Rangers	6.0%	6.3%	6.7%					36.8%	36.0%	7.8%	0.4%				
Edmonton	5.0%	5.3%	5.7%						48.8%	30.7%	4.3%	0.1%			
NY Islanders	3.5%	3.8%	4.1%							60.5%	25.7%	2.4%	<0.1%		
Carolina	3.0%	3.3%	3.6%								69.6%	19.4%	1.1%	<0.1%	
Calgary	2.5%	2.7%	3.0%									78.0%	13.3%	0.4%	<0.1%
Dallas	2.0%	2.2%	2.4%										85.5%	7.8%	0.1%
St. Louis	1.5%	1.7%	1.8%											91.8%	3.2%
Florida	1.0%	1.1%	1.2%												96.7%

== Top prospects ==
Source: NHL Central Scouting final (April 16, 2018) ranking.

Ranking	North American skaters	European skaters
1	(Russia) Andrei Svechnikov (RW)	(Sweden) Rasmus Dahlin (D)
2	(United States) Brady Tkachuk (LW)	(Sweden) Adam Boqvist (D)
3	(Czech Republic) Filip Zadina (RW)	(Russia) Vitali Kravtsov (RW)
4	(Canada) Evan Bouchard (D)	(Czech Republic) Martin Kaut (RW)
5	(Canada) Noah Dobson (D)	(Sweden) Adam Ginning (D)
6	(United States) Quinn Hughes (D)	(Finland) Jesperi Kotkaniemi (C)
7	(United States) Oliver Wahlstrom (RW)	(Russia) Grigori Denisenko (LW)
8	(Canada) Joseph Veleno (C)	(Sweden) Isac Lundestrom (C)
9	(Canada) Barrett Hayton (C)	(Sweden) Jacob Olofsson (C)
10	(Canada) Serron Noel (RW)	(Sweden) Filip Johansson (D)

Ranking	North American goalies	European goalies
1	(Canada) Olivier Rodrigue	(Czech Republic) Lukas Dostal
2	(Canada) Kevin Mandolese	(Czech Republic) Jakub Skarek
3	(Canada) Alexis Gravel	(Russia) Amir Miftakhov

== Selections by round ==
The order of the 2018 entry draft is listed below.

= NHL All-Star team ·	= NHL All-Star (Note: Players are identified as an All-Star if they were selected for the All-Star game at any time in their career.) ·	= NHL All-Star and NHL All-Star team ·

=== Round one ===
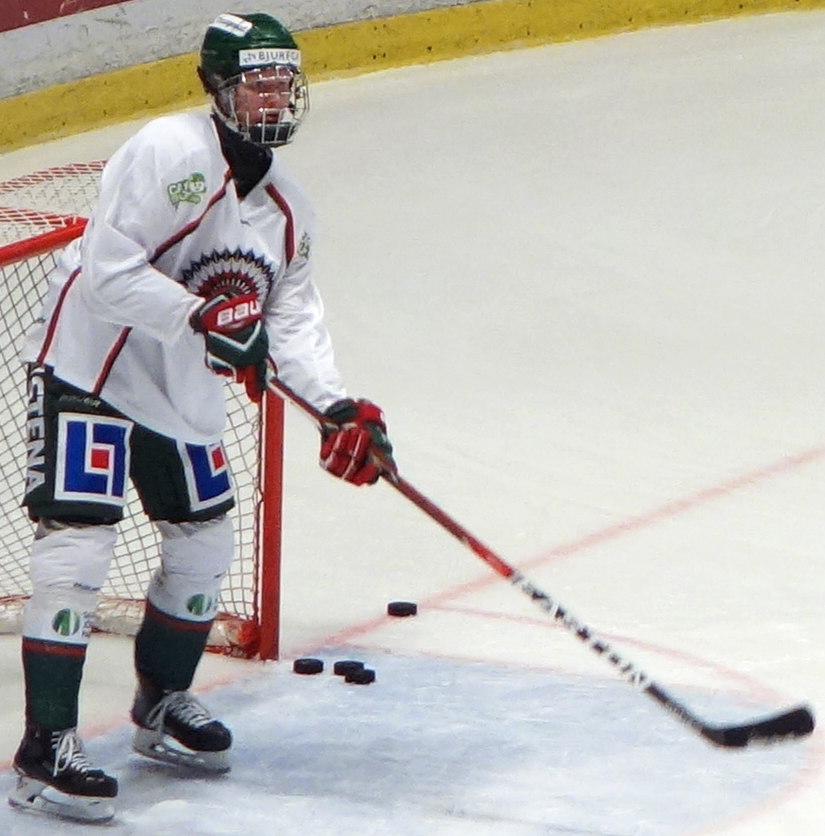
Rasmus Dahlin was selected first overall by the Buffalo Sabres.
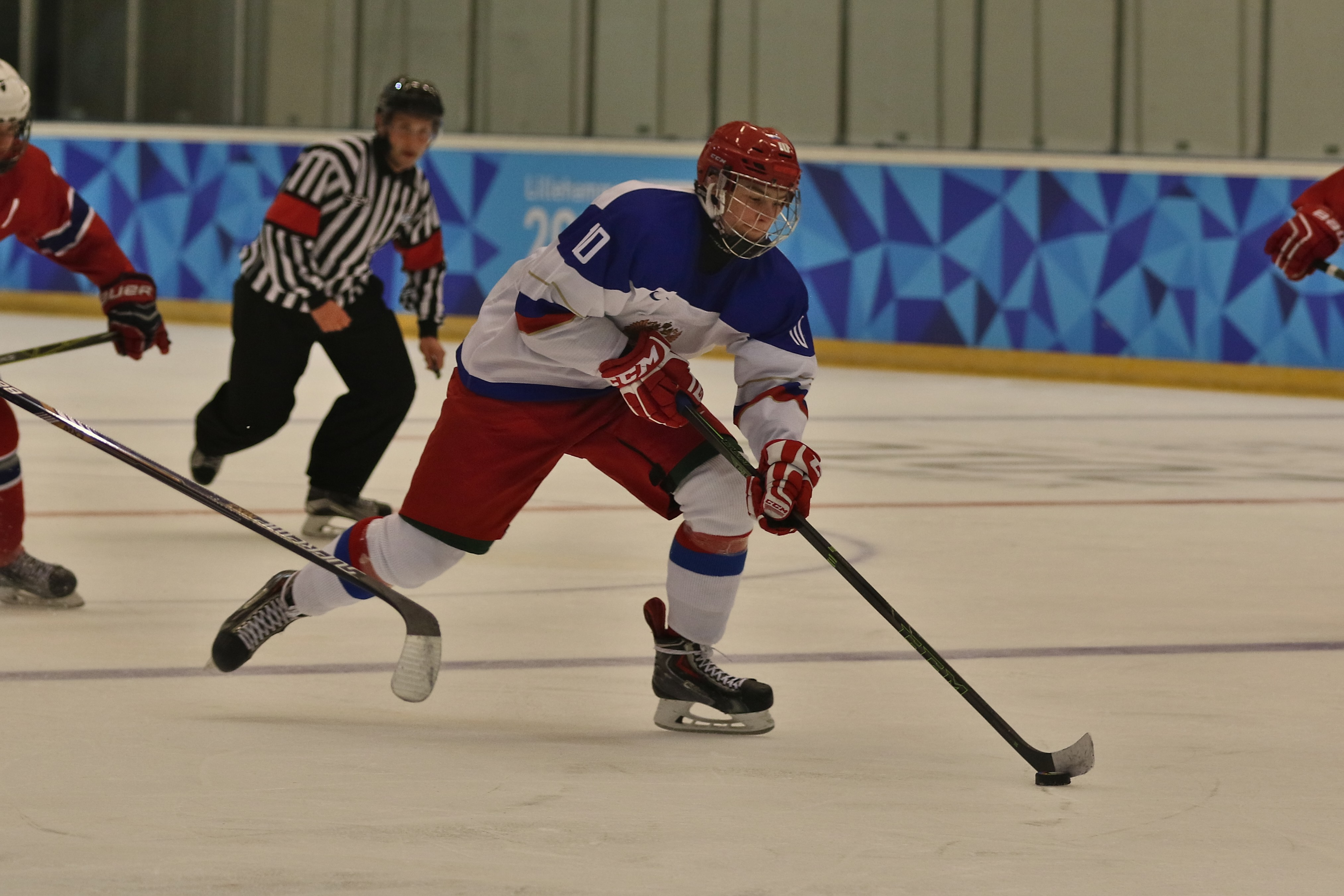
Andrei Svechnikov was selected second overall by the Carolina Hurricanes.

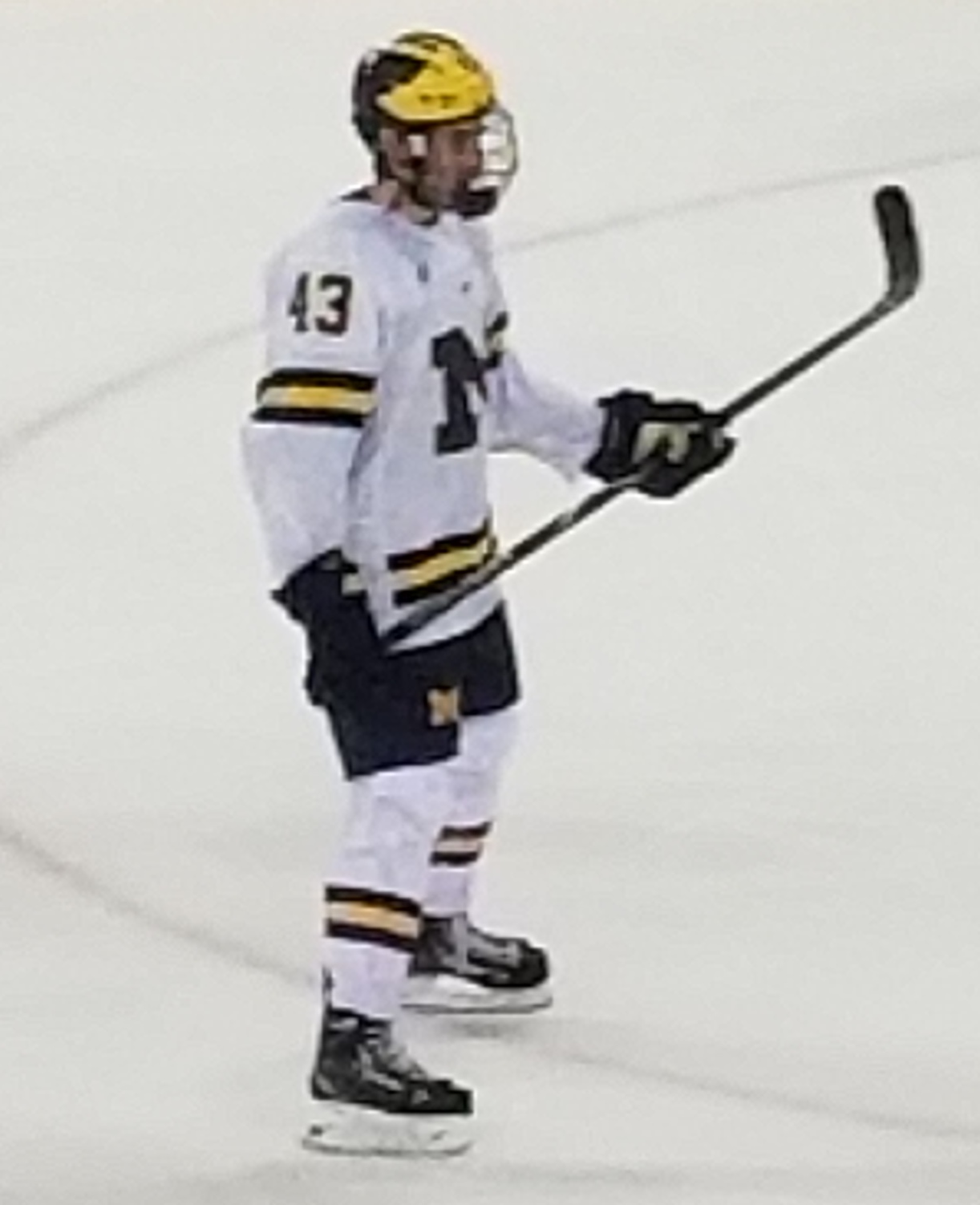
Quinn Hughes was selected seventh overall by the Vancouver Canucks.

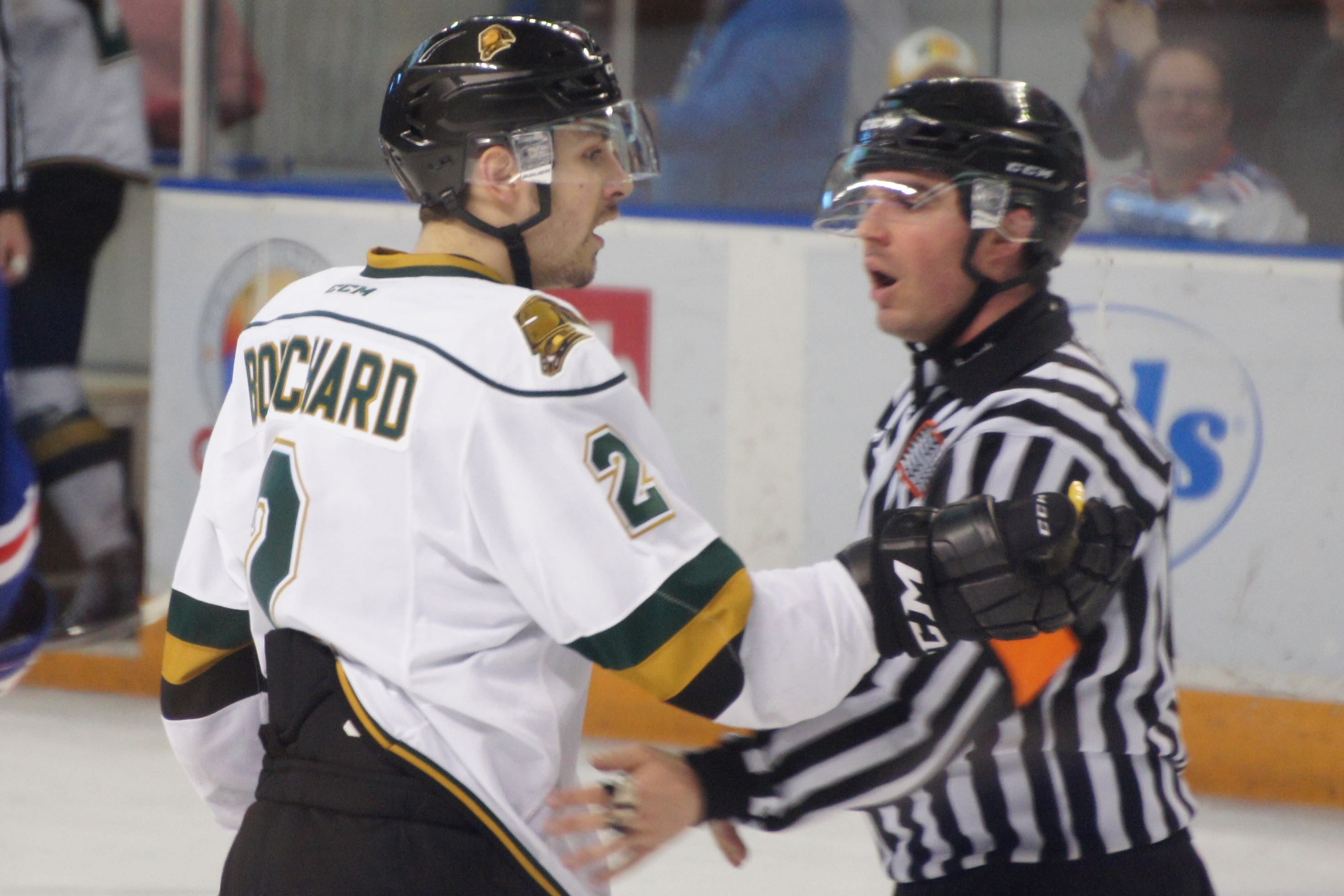
Evan Bouchard was selected tenth overall by the Edmonton Oilers.

#	Player	Nationality	NHL team	College/junior/club team
1	Rasmus Dahlin (D)	Sweden	Buffalo Sabres	Frolunda HC (SHL)
2	Andrei Svechnikov (RW)	Russia	Carolina Hurricanes	Barrie Colts (OHL)
3	Jesperi Kotkaniemi (C)	Finland	Montreal Canadiens	Assat (Liiga)
4	Brady Tkachuk (LW)	United States	Ottawa Senators	Boston University (Hockey East)
5	Barrett Hayton (C)	Canada	Arizona Coyotes	Sault Ste. Marie Greyhounds (OHL)
6	Filip Zadina (RW)	Czech Republic	Detroit Red Wings	Halifax Mooseheads (QMJHL)
7	Quinn Hughes (D)	United States	Vancouver Canucks	University of Michigan (Big Ten)
8	Adam Boqvist (D)	Sweden	Chicago Blackhawks	Brynas IF (SHL)
9	Vitali Kravtsov (RW)	Russia	New York Rangers	Traktor Chelyabinsk (KHL)
10	Evan Bouchard (D)	Canada	Edmonton Oilers	London Knights (OHL)
11	Oliver Wahlstrom (RW)	United States	New York Islanders	U.S. NTDP (USHL)
12	Noah Dobson (D)	Canada	New York Islanders (from Calgary)^{1}	Acadie–Bathurst Titan (QMJHL)
13	Ty Dellandrea (C)	Canada	Dallas Stars	Flint Firebirds (OHL)
14	Joel Farabee (LW)	United States	Philadelphia Flyers (from St. Louis)^{2}	U.S. NTDP (USHL)
15	Grigori Denisenko (LW)	Russia	Florida Panthers	Lokomotiv Yaroslavl (KHL)
16	Martin Kaut (RW)	Czech Republic	Colorado Avalanche	Dynamo Pardubice (ELH)
17	Ty Smith (D)	Canada	New Jersey Devils	Spokane Chiefs (WHL)
18	Liam Foudy (C)	Canada	Columbus Blue Jackets	London Knights (OHL)
19	Jay O'Brien (C)	United States	Philadelphia Flyers	Thayer Academy Tigers (USHS)
20	Rasmus Kupari (C)	Finland	Los Angeles Kings	Karpat (Liiga)
21	Ryan Merkley (D)	Canada	San Jose Sharks	Guelph Storm (OHL)
22	K'Andre Miller (D)	United States	New York Rangers (from Pittsburgh via Ottawa)^{3}	U.S. NTDP (USHL)
23	Isac Lundestrom (C)	Sweden	Anaheim Ducks	Lulea HF (SHL)
24	Filip Johansson (D)	Sweden	Minnesota Wild	Leksands IF (Allsvenskan)
25	Dominik Bokk (RW)	Germany	St. Louis Blues (from Toronto)^{4}	Vaxjo Lakers (SHL)
26	Jacob Bernard-Docker (D)	Canada	Ottawa Senators (from Boston via NY Rangers)^{5}	Okotoks Oilers (AJHL)
27	Nicolas Beaudin (D)	Canada	Chicago Blackhawks (from Nashville)^{6}	Drummondville Voltigeurs (QMJHL)
28	Nils Lundkvist (D)	Sweden	New York Rangers (from Tampa Bay)^{7}	Lulea HF (SHL)
29	Rasmus Sandin (D)	Sweden	Toronto Maple Leafs (from Winnipeg via St. Louis)^{8}	Sault Ste. Marie Greyhounds (OHL)
30	Joseph Veleno (C)	Canada	Detroit Red Wings (from Vegas)^{9}	Drummondville Voltigeurs (QMJHL)
31	Alexander Alexeyev (D)	Russia	Washington Capitals	Red Deer Rebels (WHL)

Notes

1. The Calgary Flames' first-round pick went to the New York Islanders as the result of a trade on June 24, 2017, that sent Travis Hamonic and a conditional fourth-round pick in 2019 to Calgary in exchange for a second-round pick in 2018, a conditional second-round pick in 2019 and this pick.
2. The St. Louis Blues' first-round pick went to the Philadelphia Flyers as the result of a trade on June 23, 2017, that sent Brayden Schenn to St. Louis in exchange for Jori Lehtera, Washington's first-round pick in 2017 and this pick (being conditional at the time of the trade). The condition – Philadelphia will receive a first-round pick in 2018 if the Blues' first-round pick is outside of the top ten selections – was converted on April 28, 2018.
3. The Pittsburgh Penguins' first-round pick went to the New York Rangers as the result of a trade on June 22, 2018, that sent Boston's first-round pick and New Jersey's second-round pick (26th and 48th overall) both in 2018 to Ottawa in exchange for this pick.
  Ottawa previously acquired this pick as the result of a trade on February 23, 2018, that sent Derick Brassard and a third-round pick in 2018 to Pittsburgh in exchange for Ian Cole, Filip Gustavsson and this pick.
4. The Toronto Maple Leafs' first-round pick went to the St. Louis Blues as the result of a trade on June 22, 2018, that sent Winnipeg's first-round pick in 2018 (29th overall) and a third-round pick in 2018 (76th overall) to Toronto in exchange for this pick.
5. The Boston Bruins' first-round pick went to the Ottawa Senators as the result of a trade on June 22, 2018, that sent Pittsburgh's first-round pick in 2018 (22nd overall) to the New York Rangers in exchange for New Jersey's second-round pick in 2018 (48th overall) and this pick.
  The Rangers previously acquired this pick as the result of a trade on February 25, 2018, that sent Rick Nash to Boston in exchange for Ryan Spooner, Matt Beleskey, Ryan Lindgren, a seventh-round pick in 2019 and this pick.
6. The Nashville Predators' first-round pick went to the Chicago Blackhawks as the result of a trade on February 26, 2018, that sent Ryan Hartman and a fifth-round pick in 2018 to Nashville in exchange for Victor Ejdsell, a fourth-round pick in 2018 and this pick.
7. The Tampa Bay Lightning's first-round pick went to the New York Rangers as the result of a trade on February 26, 2018, that sent Ryan McDonagh and J.T. Miller to Tampa Bay in exchange for Vladislav Namestnikov, Libor Hajek, Brett Howden, a conditional first-round pick in 2019 and this pick.
8. The Winnipeg Jets' first-round pick went to the Toronto Maple Leafs as the result of a trade on June 22, 2018, that sent a first-round pick in 2018 (25th overall) to St. Louis in exchange for a third-round pick in 2018 (76th overall) and this pick.
  St. Louis previously acquired this pick as the result of a trade on February 26, 2018, that sent Paul Stastny to Winnipeg in exchange for Erik Foley, a conditional fourth-round pick in 2020 and this pick (being conditional at the time of the trade). The condition – St. Louis will receive a first-round pick in 2018 if the Jets' first-round pick in 2018 is outside of the top three selections – was converted when the Jets qualified for the 2018 Stanley Cup playoffs on March 25, 2018.
9. The Vegas Golden Knights' first-round pick went to the Detroit Red Wings as the result of a trade on February 26, 2018, that sent Tomas Tatar to Vegas in exchange for the Islanders' second-round pick in 2019, a third-round pick in 2021 and this pick.

=== Round two ===
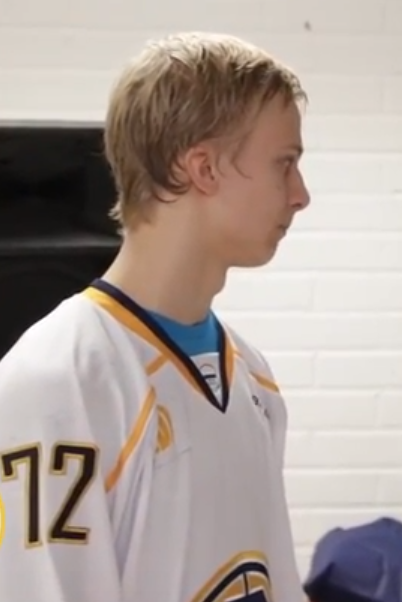
Jesse Ylonen was selected 35th overall by the Montreal Canadiens.

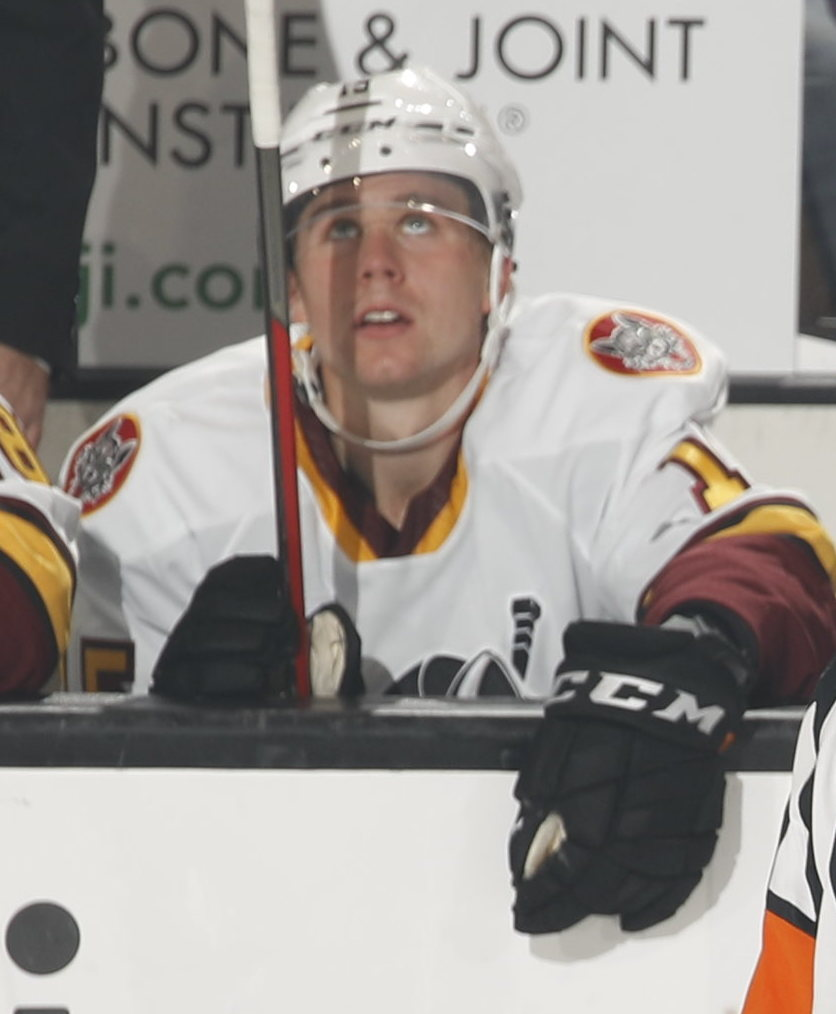
Jack Drury was selected 42nd overall by the Carolina Hurricanes.

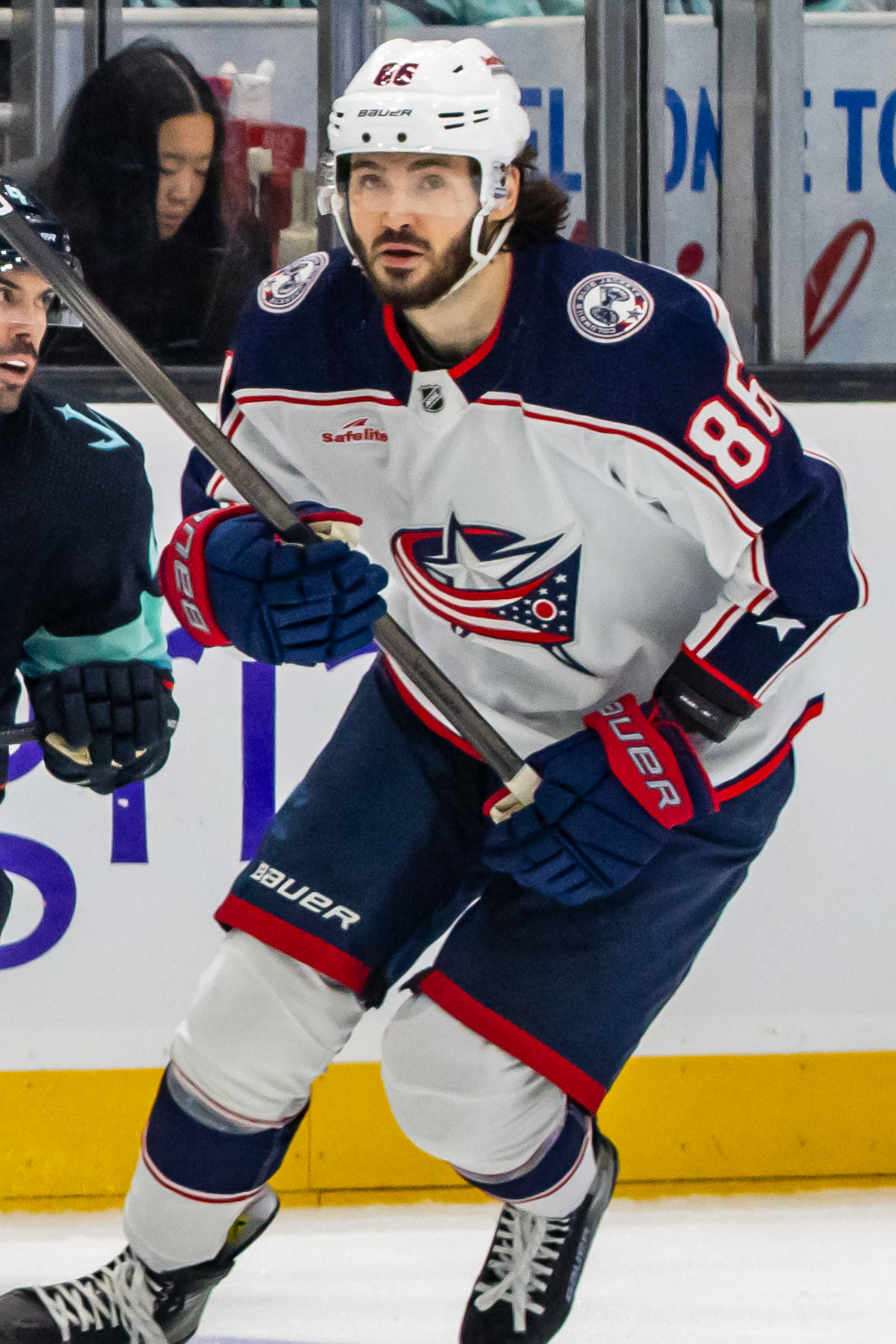
Kirill Marchenko was selected 49th overall by the Columbus Blue Jackets.

#	Player	Nationality	NHL team	College/junior/club team
32	Mattias Samuelsson (D)	United States	Buffalo Sabres	U.S. NTDP (USHL)
33	Jonatan Berggren (RW)	Sweden	Detroit Red Wings (from Ottawa via NY Rangers)^{1}	Skelleftea AIK J20 (SuperElit)
34	Serron Noel (RW)	Canada	Florida Panthers (from Arizona)^{2}	Oshawa Generals (OHL)
35	Jesse Ylonen (RW)	Finland	Montreal Canadiens	Espoo United (Mestis)
36	Jared McIsaac (D)	Canada	Detroit Red Wings	Halifax Mooseheads (QMJHL)
37	Jett Woo (D)	Canada	Vancouver Canucks	Moose Jaw Warriors (WHL)
38	Alexander Romanov (D)	Russia	Montreal Canadiens (from Chicago)^{3}	Krasnaya Armiya (MHL)
39	Olof Lindbom (G)	Sweden	New York Rangers	Djurgardens IF J20 (SuperElit)
40	Ryan McLeod (C)	Canada	Edmonton Oilers	Mississauga Steelheads (OHL)
41	Bode Wilde (D)	United States	New York Islanders	U.S. NTDP (USHL)
42	Jack Drury (C)	United States	Carolina Hurricanes	Waterloo Black Hawks (USHL)
43	Ruslan Iskhakov (C)	Russia	New York Islanders (from Calgary)^{4}	Krasnaya Armiya (MHL)
44	Albin Eriksson (RW)	Sweden	Dallas Stars	Skelleftea AIK (SHL)
45	Scott Perunovich (D)	United States	St. Louis Blues	Minnesota–Duluth Bulldogs (NCHC)
46	Martin Fehervary (D)	Slovakia	Washington Capitals (from Florida via New Jersey)^{5}	IK Oskarshamn (HockeyAllsvenskan)
47	Kody Clark (RW)	Canada	Washington Capitals (from Colorado)^{6}	Ottawa 67's (OHL)
48	Jonathan Tychonick (D)	Canada	Ottawa Senators (from New Jersey via NY Rangers)^{7}	Penticton Vees (BCHL)
49	Kirill Marchenko (RW)	Russia	Columbus Blue Jackets	Mamonty Yugry (MHL)
50	Adam Ginning (D)	Sweden	Philadelphia Flyers	Linkopings HC (SHL)
51	Akil Thomas (C)	Canada	Los Angeles Kings	Niagara IceDogs (OHL)
52	Sean Durzi (D)	Canada	Toronto Maple Leafs (from San Jose)^{8}	Owen Sound Attack (OHL)
53	Calen Addison (D)	Canada	Pittsburgh Penguins	Lethbridge Hurricanes (WHL)
54	Benoit-Olivier Groulx (C)	Canada	Anaheim Ducks	Halifax Mooseheads (QMJHL)
55	Kevin Bahl (D)	Canada	Arizona Coyotes (from Minnesota)^{9}	Ottawa 67's (OHL)
56	Jacob Olofsson (C)	Sweden	Montreal Canadiens (from Toronto)^{10}	Timra IK (HockeyAllsvenskan)
57	Axel Andersson (D)	Sweden	Boston Bruins	Djurgardens IF (SuperElit)
58	Filip Hallander (C)	Sweden	Pittsburgh Penguins (from Nashville via Colorado)^{11}	Timra IK (HockeyAllsvenskan)
59	Gabriel Fortier (LW)	Canada	Tampa Bay Lightning	Baie-Comeau Drakkar (QMJHL)
60	David Gustafsson (C)	Sweden	Winnipeg Jets	HV71 (SHL)
61	Ivan Morozov (C)	Russia	Vegas Golden Knights	Mamonty Yugry (MHL)
62	Olivier Rodrigue (G)	Canada	Edmonton Oilers (from Washington via Montreal)^{12}	Drummondville Voltigeurs (QMJHL)

Notes

1. The Ottawa Senators' second-round pick went to the Detroit Red Wings as the result of a trade on February 28, 2017, that sent Brendan Smith to the New York Rangers in exchange for a third-round pick in 2017 and this pick.
  The Rangers previously acquired this pick as the result of a trade on July 18, 2016, that sent Derick Brassard and a seventh-round pick in 2018 to Ottawa in exchange for Mika Zibanejad and this pick.
2. The Arizona Coyotes' second-round pick went to the Florida Panthers as the result of a trade on August 25, 2016, that sent Dave Bolland and Lawson Crouse to Arizona in exchange for a third-round pick in 2017 and this pick (being conditional at the time of the trade). The condition – Florida will receive a second-round pick in 2018 if Crouse plays in 10 or more games for Arizona in the 2016–17 season – was converted on November 10, 2016.
3. The Chicago Blackhawks' second-round pick went to the Montreal Canadiens as the result of a trade on February 26, 2016, that sent Tomas Fleischmann and Dale Weise to Chicago in exchange for Phillip Danault and this pick.
4. The Calgary Flames' second-round pick went to the New York Islanders as the result of a trade on June 24, 2017, that sent Travis Hamonic and a conditional fourth-round pick in 2019 to Calgary in exchange for a first-round pick in 2018, a conditional second-round pick in 2019 and this pick.
5. The Florida Panthers' second-round pick went the Washington Capitals as the result of a trade on July 2, 2017, that sent Marcus Johansson to New Jersey in exchange for Toronto's third-round pick in 2018 and this pick.
  New Jersey previously acquired this pick as the result of a trade on June 10, 2016, that sent Paul Thompson and Graham Black to Florida in exchange for Marc Savard and this pick.
6. The Colorado Avalanche's second-round pick went to the Washington Capitals as the result of a trade on June 22, 2018, that sent Philipp Grubauer and Brooks Orpik to Colorado in exchange for this pick.
7. The New Jersey Devils' second-round pick went to the Ottawa Senators as the result of a trade on June 22, 2018, that sent Pittsburgh's first-round pick in 2018 (22nd overall) to the New York Rangers in exchange for Boston's first-round pick in 2018 (26th overall) and this pick.
  The Rangers previously acquired this pick as the result of a trade on February 22, 2018, that sent Michael Grabner to New Jersey in exchange for Yegor Rykov and this pick.
8. The San Jose Sharks' second-round pick went to the Toronto Maple Leafs as the result of a trade on February 22, 2016, that sent Roman Polak and Nick Spaling to San Jose in exchange for Raffi Torres, a second-round pick in 2017 and this pick.
9. The Minnesota Wild's second-round pick went to the Arizona Coyotes as the result of a trade on February 26, 2017, that sent Martin Hanzal, Ryan White and a fourth-round pick in 2017 to Minnesota in exchange for Grayson Downing, a first-round pick in 2017, a conditional fourth-round pick in 2019 and this pick.
10. The Toronto Maple Leafs' second-round pick went to the Montreal Canadiens as the result of a trade on February 25, 2018, that sent Tomas Plekanec and Kyle Baun to Toronto in exchange for Kerby Rychel, Rinat Valiev and this pick.
11. The Nashville Predators' second-round pick went to the Pittsburgh Penguins as the result of a trade on June 23, 2018, that sent Ottawa's third-round pick and a fifth-round pick both in 2018 (64th and 146th overall) to Colorado in exchange for this pick.
  Colorado previously acquired this pick as the result of a trade on November 5, 2017, that sent Kyle Turris to Nashville in exchange for Samuel Girard, Vladislav Kamenev and this pick.
12. The Washington Capitals' second-round pick went to the Edmonton Oilers as the result of a trade on June 23, 2018, that sent a third and fifth-round pick both in 2018 (71st and 133rd overall) to Montreal in exchange for this pick.
  Montreal previously acquired this pick as the result of a trade on June 24, 2016, that sent Lars Eller to Washington in exchange for a second-round pick in 2017 and this pick.

=== Round three ===
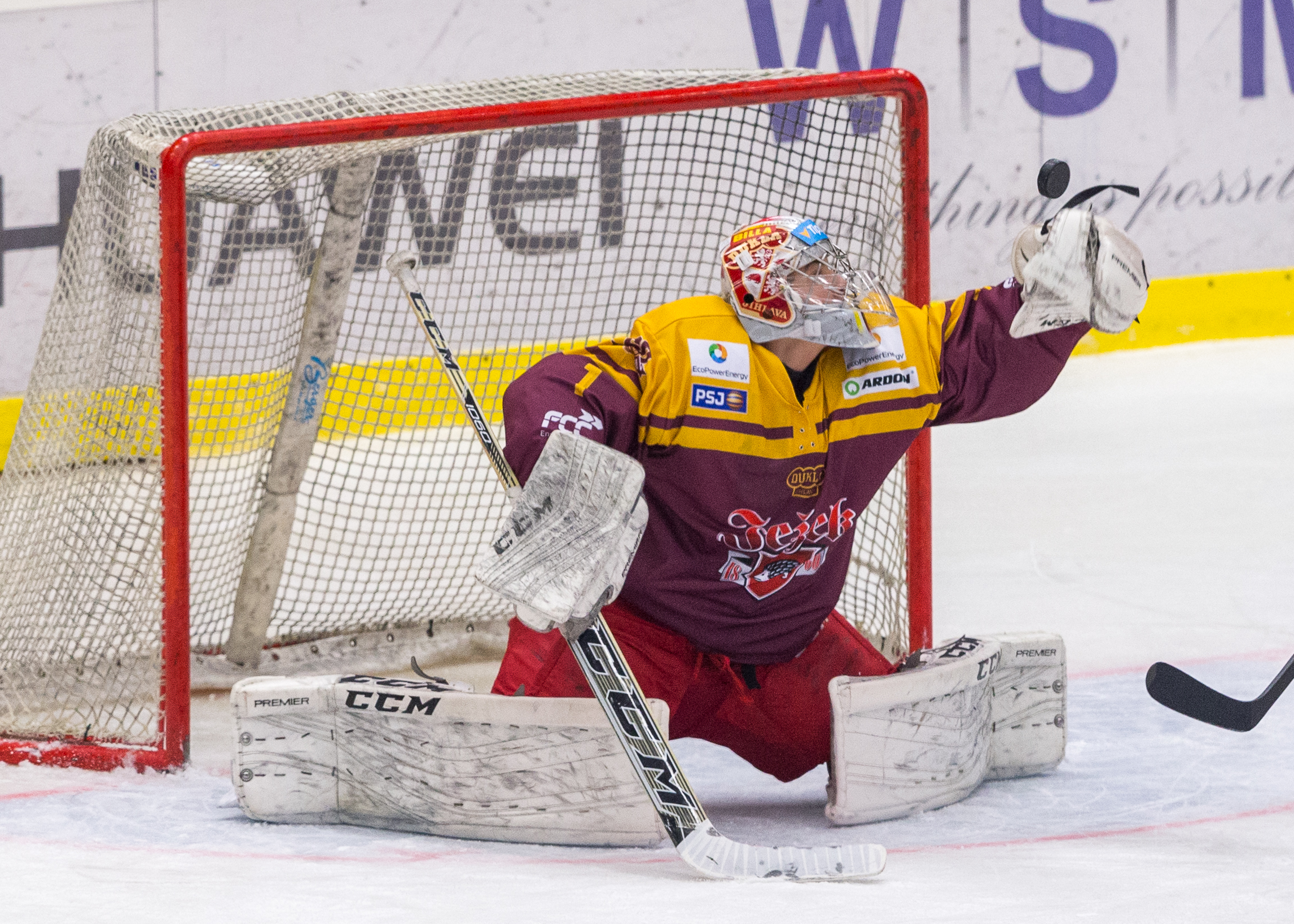
Jakub Skarek was selected 72nd overall by the New York Islanders.

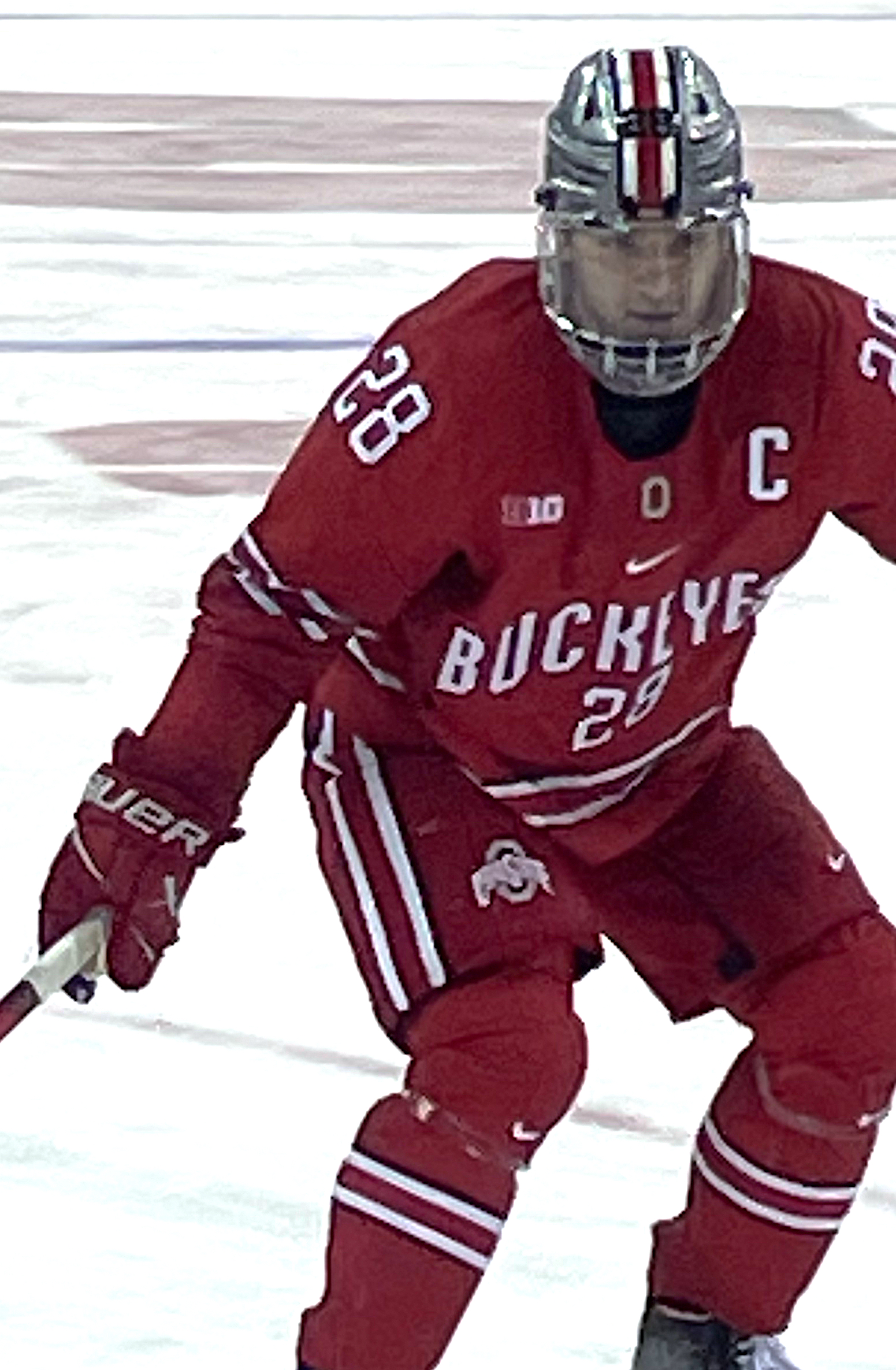
Jake Wise was selected 69th overall by the Chicago Blackhawks.

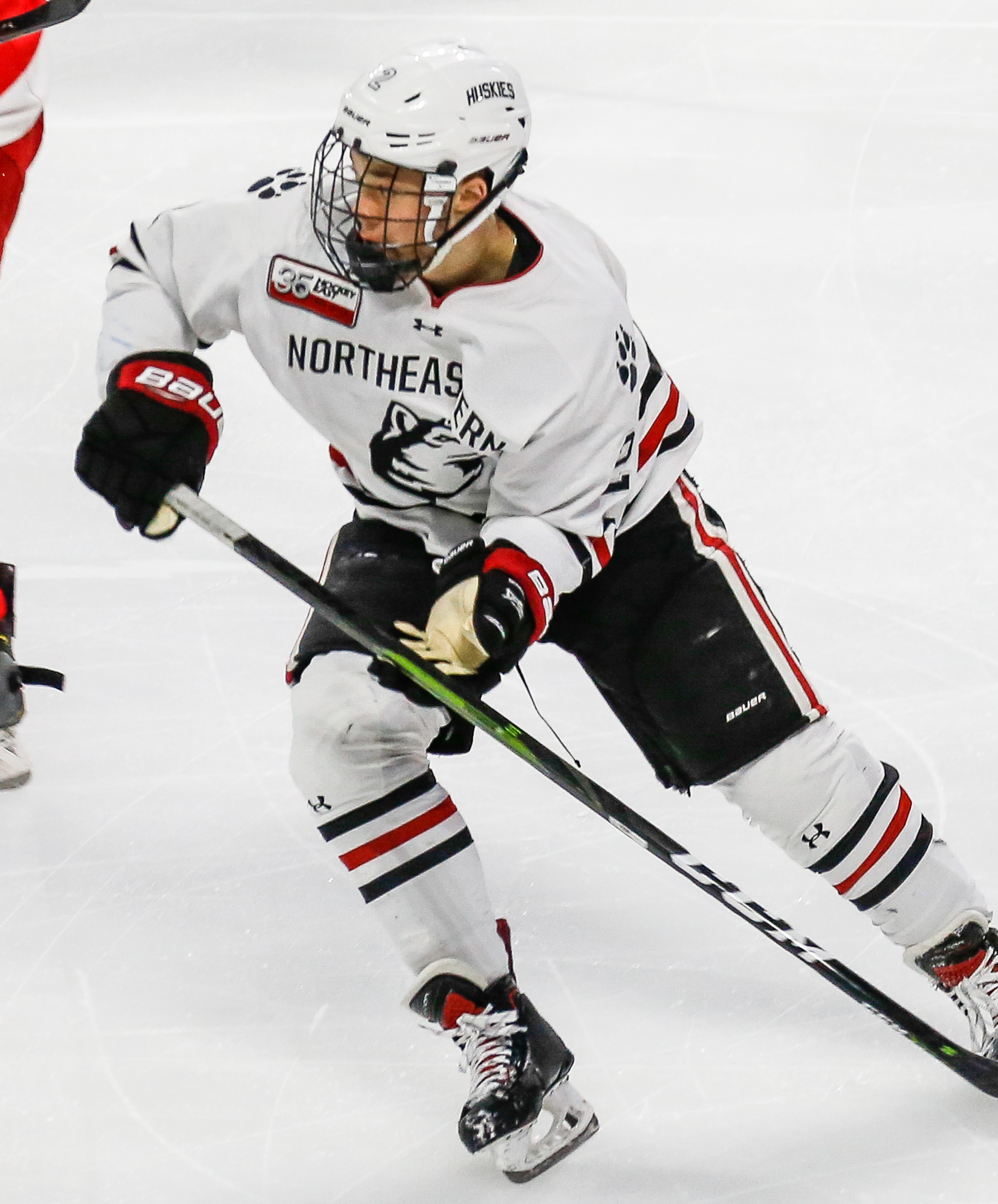
Jordan Harris was selected 71st overall by the Montreal Canadiens.

#	Player	Nationality	NHL team	College/junior/club team
63	Jack McBain (C)	Canada	Minnesota Wild (from Buffalo)^{1}	Toronto Jr. Canadiens (OJHL)
64	Justus Annunen (G)	Finland	Colorado Avalanche (from Ottawa via Pittsburgh)^{2}	Karpat U20 (Nuorten SM-liiga)
65	Jan Jenik (RW)	Czech Republic	Arizona Coyotes	Benatky nad Jizerou (Czech 1.Liga)
66	Cameron Hillis (C)	Canada	Montreal Canadiens	Guelph Storm (OHL)
67	Alec Regula (D)	United States	Detroit Red Wings	London Knights (OHL)
68	Tyler Madden (C)	United States	Vancouver Canucks	Tri-City Storm (USHL)
69	Jake Wise (C)	United States	Chicago Blackhawks	U.S. NTDP (USHL)
70	Jacob Ragnarsson (D)	Sweden	New York Rangers	Almtuna IS (Allsvenskan)
71	Jordan Harris (D)	United States	Montreal Canadiens (from Edmonton)^{3}	Kimball Union Academy (USHS)
72	Jakub Skarek (G)	Czech Republic	New York Islanders	Dukla Jihlava (ELH)
73	Ty Emberson (D)	United States	Arizona Coyotes (from Carolina)^{4}	U.S. NTDP (USHL)
74	Niklas Nordgren (RW)	Finland	Chicago Blackhawks (from Calgary via Arizona)^{5}	HIFK (Liiga)
75	Oskar Back (C)	Sweden	Dallas Stars	Farjestad BK J20 (SuperElit)
76	Semyon Der-Arguchintsev (C)	Russia	Toronto Maple Leafs (from St. Louis)^{6}	Peterborough Petes (OHL)
77	Jakub Lauko (C)	Czech Republic	Boston Bruins (from Florida)^{7}	Pirati Chomutov (ELH)
78	Sampo Ranta (LW)	Finland	Colorado Avalanche	Sioux City Musketeers (USHL)
79	Blake McLaughlin (LW)	United States	Anaheim Ducks (from New Jersey)^{8}	Chicago Steel (USHL)
80	Marcus Karlberg (LW)	Sweden	Columbus Blue Jackets	Leksands IF J20 (SuperElit)
81	Seth Barton (D)	Canada	Detroit Red Wings (from Philadelphia)^{9}	Trail Smoke Eaters (BCHL)
82	Bulat Shafigullin (LW)	Russia	Los Angeles Kings	Neftekhimik Nizhnekamsk (KHL)
83	Riley Stotts (C)	Canada	Toronto Maple Leafs (from San Jose)^{10}	Calgary Hitmen (WHL)
84	Jesper Eliasson (G)	Sweden	Detroit Red Wings (from Pittsburgh)^{11}	IF Troja-Ljungby J20 (SuperElit)
85	Lukas Dostal (G)	Czech Republic	Anaheim Ducks	SK Horacka Slavia Trebic (Czech 1.liga)
86	Alexander Khovanov (C)	Russia	Minnesota Wild	Moncton Wildcats (QMJHL)
87	Linus Karlsson (C)	Sweden	San Jose Sharks (from Toronto via New Jersey, Washington, Chicago and Arizona)^{12}	Karlskrona HK J20 (SuperElit)
88	Joey Keane (D)	United States	New York Rangers (from Boston)^{13}	Barrie Colts (OHL)
89	Logan Hutsko (RW)	United States	Florida Panthers (from Nashville)^{14}	Boston College (Hockey East)
90	Dmitry Semykin (D)	Russia	Tampa Bay Lightning	Kapitan Stupino (MHL)
91	Nathan Smith (C)	United States	Winnipeg Jets	Cedar Rapids RoughRiders (USHL)
92	Connor Dewar (C)	Canada	Minnesota Wild (from Vegas)^{15}	Everett Silvertips (WHL)
93	Riley Sutter (C/RW)	Canada	Washington Capitals	Everett Silvertips (WHL)

Notes

1. The Buffalo Sabres' third-round pick went to the Minnesota Wild as the result of a trade on June 30, 2017, that sent Jason Pominville, Marco Scandella and a fourth-round pick in 2018 to Buffalo in exchange for Tyler Ennis, Marcus Foligno and this pick.
2. The Ottawa Senators' third-round pick went to the Colorado Avalanche as the result of a trade on June 23, 2018, that sent Nashville's second-round pick in 2018 (58th overall) to Pittsburgh in exchange for a fifth-round pick in 2018 (146th overall) and this pick.
  Pittsburgh previously acquired this pick as the result of a trade on February 23, 2018, that sent Ian Cole, Filip Gustavsson and a first-round pick in 2018 to Ottawa in exchange for Vincent Dunn and this pick.
3. The Edmonton Oilers' third-round pick went to the Montreal Canadiens as the result of a trade on June 23, 2018, that sent Washington's second-round pick in 2018 (62nd overall) to Edmonton in exchange for a fifth-round pick in 2018 (133rd overall) and this pick.
4. The Carolina Hurricanes' third-round pick went to the Arizona Coyotes as the result of a trade on May 3, 2018, that sent Jordan Martinook and a fourth-round pick in 2018 to Carolina in exchange for Marcus Kruger and this pick.
5. The Calgary Flames' third-round pick went to the Chicago Blackhawks as the result of a trade on June 23, 2018, that sent Toronto's third-round pick and Columbus' fifth-round pick both in 2018 (87th and 142nd overall) to Arizona in exchange for this pick.
  Arizona previously acquired this pick as the result of a trade on June 17, 2017, that sent Mike Smith to Calgary in exchange for Chad Johnson, Brandon Hickey and this pick (being conditional at the time of the trade). The condition – Arizona will receive a third-round pick in 2018 if Calgary fails to qualify for the 2018 Stanley Cup playoffs – was converted on March 26, 2018.
6. The St. Louis Blues' third-round pick went the Toronto Maple Leafs as the result of a trade on June 22, 2018, that sent a first-round pick in 2018 (25th overall) to St. Louis in exchange for Winnipeg's first-round pick in 2018 (29th overall) and this pick.
7. The Florida Panthers' third-round pick went to the Boston Bruins as the result of a trade on February 22, 2018, that sent Frank Vatrano to Florida in exchange for this pick.
8. The New Jersey Devils' third-round pick went to the Anaheim Ducks as the result of a trade on November 30, 2017, that sent Sami Vatanen and a conditional third-round pick in 2019 or 2020 to New Jersey in exchange for Adam Henrique, Joseph Blandisi and this pick.
9. The Philadelphia Flyers' third-round pick went to the Detroit Red Wings as the result of a trade on February 19, 2018, that sent Petr Mrazek to Philadelphia in exchange for a conditional third-round pick in 2019 and this pick (being conditional at the time of the trade). The condition – Detroit will receive a third-round pick in 2018 if the Flyers qualify for the 2018 Stanley Cup playoffs and Mrazek wins five regular season games – was converted on April 7, 2018.
10. The San Jose Sharks' third-round pick went to the Toronto Maple Leafs as the result of a trade on February 27, 2016, that sent James Reimer and Jeremy Morin to San Jose in exchange for Alex Stalock, Ben Smith and this pick (being conditional at the time of the trade). The condition – Toronto will receive a third-round pick in 2018 if the Sharks qualify for the 2016 Stanley Cup Finals – was converted on May 25, 2016.
11. The Pittsburgh Penguins' third-round pick went to the Detroit Red Wings as the result of a trade on October 21, 2017, that sent Riley Sheahan and a fifth-round pick in 2018 to Pittsburgh in exchange for Scott Wilson and this pick.
12. The Toronto Maple Leafs' third-round pick went to the San Jose Sharks as the result of a trade on June 23, 2018, that sent a fourth and fifth-round pick both in 2018 (114th and 145th overall) to Arizona in exchange for this pick.
  Arizona previously acquired this pick as the result of a trade June 23, 2018, that sent Calgary's third-round pick in 2018 (74th overall) to Chicago in exchange for Columbus' fifth-round pick in 2018 (142nd overall) and this pick.
  Chicago previously acquired this pick as the result of a trade on February 19, 2018, that sent Michal Kempny to Washington in exchange for this pick (being conditional at the time of the trade). The condition – Chicago will receive the higher of Toronto or Washington's third-round pick in 2018 – was converted on April 25, 2018, when Toronto was eliminated from the 2018 Stanley Cup playoffs ensuring that Toronto would select higher than Washington.
  Washington previously acquired this pick as the result of a trade on July 2, 2017, that sent Marcus Johansson to New Jersey in exchange for Florida's second-round pick in 2018 and this pick.
  New Jersey previously acquired this pick as compensation for Toronto hiring Lou Lamoriello as their general manager on July 23, 2015.
13. The Boston Bruins' third-round pick went to the New York Rangers as the result of a trade on February 20, 2018, that sent Nick Holden to Boston in exchange for Rob O'Gara and this pick.
14. The Nashville Predators' third-round pick went to the Florida Panthers as the result of a trade on June 23, 2018, that sent a third-round pick in 2019 to Nashville in exchange for this pick.
15. The Vegas Golden Knights' third-round pick went to the Minnesota Wild as the result of a trade on June 21, 2017, that sent Alex Tuch to Vegas in exchange for this pick (being conditional at the time of the trade). The condition – Minnesota will receive a third-round pick in 2018 if Vegas does not acquire any additional third-round picks in 2017 – was converted on June 24, 2017.

=== Round four ===
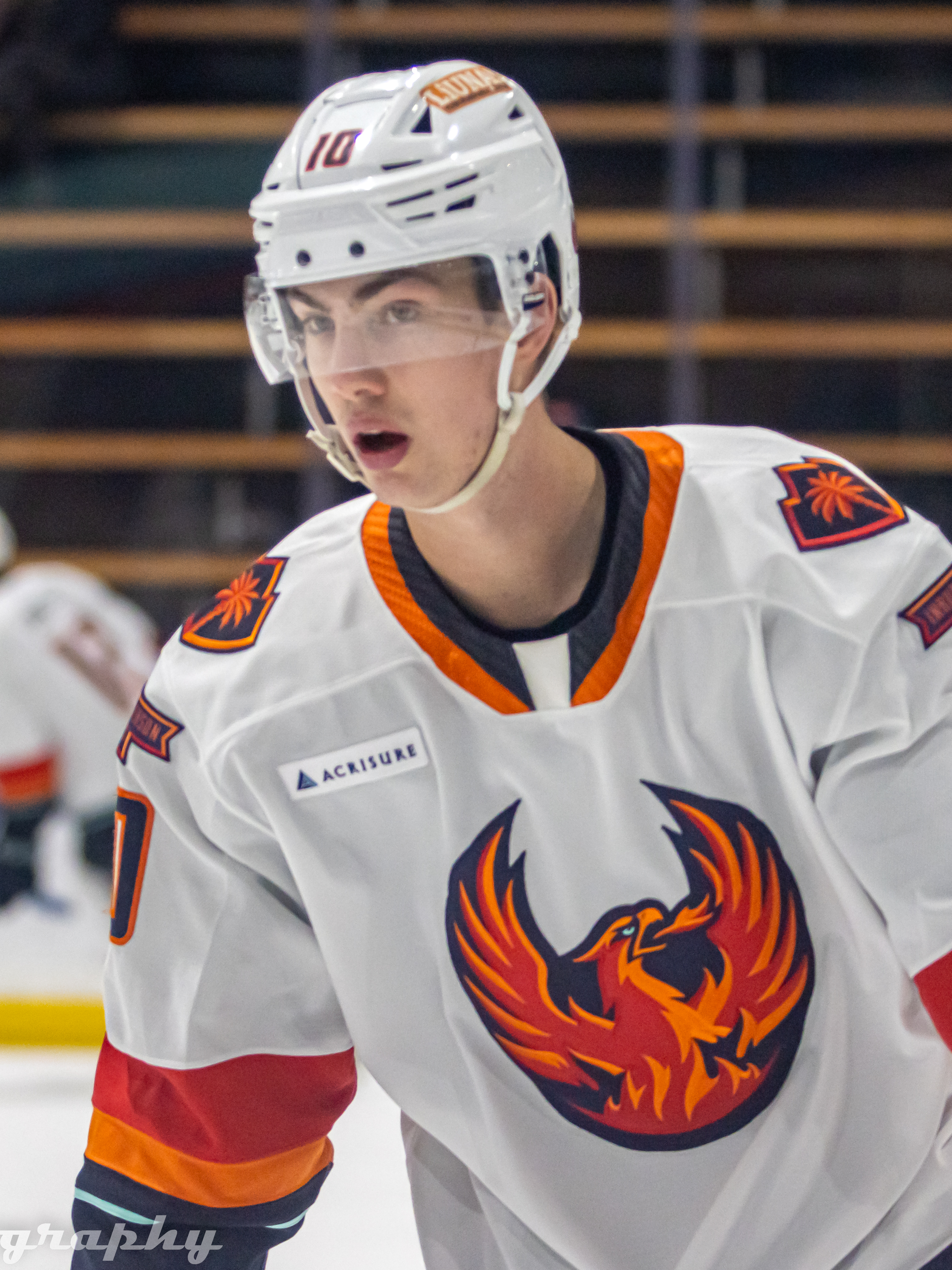
Luke Henman was selected 96th overall by the Carolina Hurricanes.

#	Player	Nationality	NHL team	College/junior/club team
94	Matej Pekar (C)	Czech Republic	Buffalo Sabres	Muskegon Lumberjacks (USHL)
95	Jonathan Gruden (C)	United States	Ottawa Senators	U.S. NTDP (USHL)
96	Luke Henman (C)	Canada	Carolina Hurricanes (from Arizona)^{1}	Blainville-Boisbriand Armada (QMJHL)
97	Allan McShane (C)	Canada	Montreal Canadiens (from Montreal via Los Angeles)^{2}	Oshawa Generals (OHL)
98	Ryan O'Reilly (RW)	United States	Detroit Red Wings	Madison Capitals (USHL)
99	Slava Demin (D)	United States	Vegas Golden Knights (from Vancouver via Pittsburgh)^{3}	Wenatchee Wild (BCHL)
100	Adam Mascherin (LW)	Canada	Dallas Stars (from Chicago)^{4}	Kitchener Rangers (OHL)
101	Nico Gross (D)	Switzerland	New York Rangers	Oshawa Generals (OHL)
102	Jasper Weatherby (C)	United States	San Jose Sharks (from Edmonton via Montreal)^{5}	Wenatchee Wild (BCHL)
103	Jacob Pivonka (C)	United States	New York Islanders	U.S. NTDP (USHL)
104	Lenni Killinen (RW)	Finland	Carolina Hurricanes	Blues U20 (Nuorten SM-liiga)
105	Martin Pospisil (C)	Slovakia	Calgary Flames	Sioux City Musketeers (USHL)
106	Curtis Douglas (C)	Canada	Dallas Stars	Windsor Spitfires (OHL)
107	Joel Hofer (G)	Canada	St. Louis Blues	Swift Current Broncos (WHL)
108	Demetrios Koumontzis (LW)	United States	Calgary Flames (from Florida)^{6}	Edina High School (USHS)
109	Tyler Weiss (LW)	United States	Colorado Avalanche	U.S. NTDP (USHL)
110	Xavier Bernard (D)	Canada	New Jersey Devils	Drummondville Voltigeurs (QMJHL)
111	Jachym Kondelik (C)	Czech Republic	Nashville Predators (from Columbus)^{7}	Muskegon Lumberjacks (USHL)
112	Jack St. Ivany (D)	United States	Philadelphia Flyers	Sioux Falls Stampede (USHL)
113	Aidan Dudas (C)	Canada	Los Angeles Kings	Owen Sound Attack (OHL)
114	Ivan Prosvetov (G)	Russia	Arizona Coyotes (from San Jose)^{8}	Youngstown Phantoms (USHL)
115	Paul Cotter (C)	United States	Vegas Golden Knights (from Pittsburgh via Tampa Bay)^{9}	Lincoln Stars (USHL)
116	Jack Perbix (RW)	United States	Anaheim Ducks	Elk River High School (USHS)
117	Linus Lindstrand Cronholm (D)	Sweden	Buffalo Sabres (from Minnesota)^{10}	Malmo Redhawks J20 (SuperElit)
118	Mac Hollowell (D)	Canada	Toronto Maple Leafs	Sault Ste. Marie Greyhounds (OHL)
119	Curtis Hall (C)	United States	Boston Bruins	Youngstown Phantoms (USHL)
120	Philipp Kurashev (C)	Switzerland	Chicago Blackhawks (from Nashville)^{11}	Quebec Remparts (QMJHL)
121	Alexander Green (D)	United States	Tampa Bay Lightning	Cornell University (ECAC)
122	Milos Roman (C)	Slovakia	Calgary Flames (from Winnipeg via Montreal)^{12}	Vancouver Giants (WHL)
123	Jack Gorniak (RW)	United States	Montreal Canadiens (from Vegas via Florida and San Jose)^{13}	West Salem High School (USHS)
124	Mitchell Gibson (G)	United States	Washington Capitals	Lone Star Brahmas (NAHL)

Notes

1. The Arizona Coyotes' fourth-round pick went to the Carolina Hurricanes as the result of a trade on May 3, 2018, that sent Marcus Kruger and a third-round pick in 2018 to Arizona in exchange for Jordan Martinook and this pick.
2. The Montreal Canadiens' fourth-round pick was re-acquired as the result of a trade on November 23, 2017, that sent Torrey Mitchell to Los Angeles in exchange for this pick (being conditional at the time of the trade). The condition – Montreal will receive Montreal's fourth-round pick in 2018 if Los Angeles qualifies for the 2018 Stanley Cup playoffs – was converted on April 4, 2018.
  Los Angeles previously acquired this pick as the result of a trade on March 1, 2017, that sent Dwight King to Montreal in exchange for this pick (being conditional at the time of the trade) The condition – Los Angeles will receive a fourth-round pick in 2018 if King does not re-sign with Montreal for the 2017–18 NHL season – was converted on June 22, 2017.
3. The Vancouver Canucks' fourth-round pick went to the Vegas Golden Knights as the result of a trade on February 23, 2018, that sent Derick Brassard to Pittsburgh in exchange for Ryan Reaves and this pick.
  Pittsburgh previously acquired this pick as the result of a trade on October 3, 2017, that sent Derrick Pouliot to Vancouver in exchange for Andrey Pedan and this pick.
4. The Chicago Blackhawks' fourth-round pick went to the Dallas Stars as the result of a trade on February 28, 2017, that sent Johnny Oduya to Chicago in exchange for Mark McNeill and this pick (being conditional at the time of the trade). The condition – Dallas will receive a fourth-round pick in 2018 if Chicago fails to advance to the 2017 Western Conference Final – was converted on April 20, 2017, when Chicago was eliminated from the playoffs.
5. The Edmonton Oilers' fourth-round pick went to the San Jose Sharks as the result of a trade on June 23, 2018, that sent Vegas' fourth-round pick and Florida's fifth-round pick both in 2018 (123rd and 139th overall) to Montreal in exchange for this pick.
  Montreal previously acquired this pick as the result of a trade on January 4, 2018, that sent Al Montoya to Edmonton in exchange for this pick (being conditional at the time of the trade). The condition – Montreal will receive a fourth-round pick in 2018 if Montoya plays in seven or more games for the Oilers during the 2017–18 NHL season – was converted on March 14, 2018.
6. The Florida Panthers' fourth-round pick went to the Calgary Flames as the result of a trade on February 27, 2016, that sent Jiri Hudler to Florida in exchange for a second-round pick in 2016 and this pick.
7. The Columbus Blue Jackets' fourth-round pick went to the Nashville Predators as the result of a trade on February 25, 2018, that sent Mark Letestu to Columbus in exchange for this pick.
8. The San Jose Sharks' fourth-round pick went to the Arizona Coyotes as the result of a trade on June 23, 2018, that sent Toronto's third-round pick in 2018 (87th overall) to San Jose in exchange for a fifth-round pick in 2018 (145th overall) and this pick.
9. The Pittsburgh Penguins' fourth-round pick went to the Vegas Golden Knights as the result of a trade on June 21, 2017, that ensured Vegas would select Jason Garrison in the 2017 NHL expansion draft from Tampa Bay in exchange for Nikita Gusev, a second-round pick in 2017 and this pick.
  Tampa Bay previously acquired this pick as the result of a trade on March 1, 2017, that sent Mark Streit to Pittsburgh in exchange for this pick.
10. The Minnesota Wild's fourth-round pick went to the Buffalo Sabres as the result of a trade on June 30, 2017, that sent Tyler Ennis, Marcus Foligno, and a third-round pick to Minnesota in exchange for Jason Pominville, Marco Scandella, and this pick.
11. The Nashville Predators' fourth-round pick went to the Chicago Blackhawks as the result of a trade on February 26, 2018, that sent Ryan Hartman and a fifth-round pick in 2018 to Nashville in exchange for Victor Ejdsell, a first-round pick in 2018 and this pick.
12. The Winnipeg Jets' fourth-round pick went to the Calgary Flames as the result of a trade on June 23, 2018, that sent a fourth-round pick in 2019 to Montreal in exchange for this pick.
  Montreal previously acquired this pick as the result of a trade on February 26, 2018, that sent Joe Morrow to Winnipeg in exchange for this pick.
13. The Vegas Golden Knights' fourth-round pick went to the Montreal Canadiens as the result of a trade on June 23, 2018, that sent Edmonton's fourth-round pick in 2018 (102nd overall) to San Jose in exchange for Florida's fifth-round pick in 2018 (139th overall) and this pick.
  San Jose previously acquired this pick as the result of a trade on June 19, 2018, that sent Mike Hoffman and a seventh-round pick in 2018 to Florida in exchange for a fifth-round pick in 2018, a second-round pick in 2019 and this pick.
  Florida previously acquired this pick as the result of a trade on June 21, 2017, that sent Reilly Smith to Vegas in exchange for this pick.

=== Round five ===
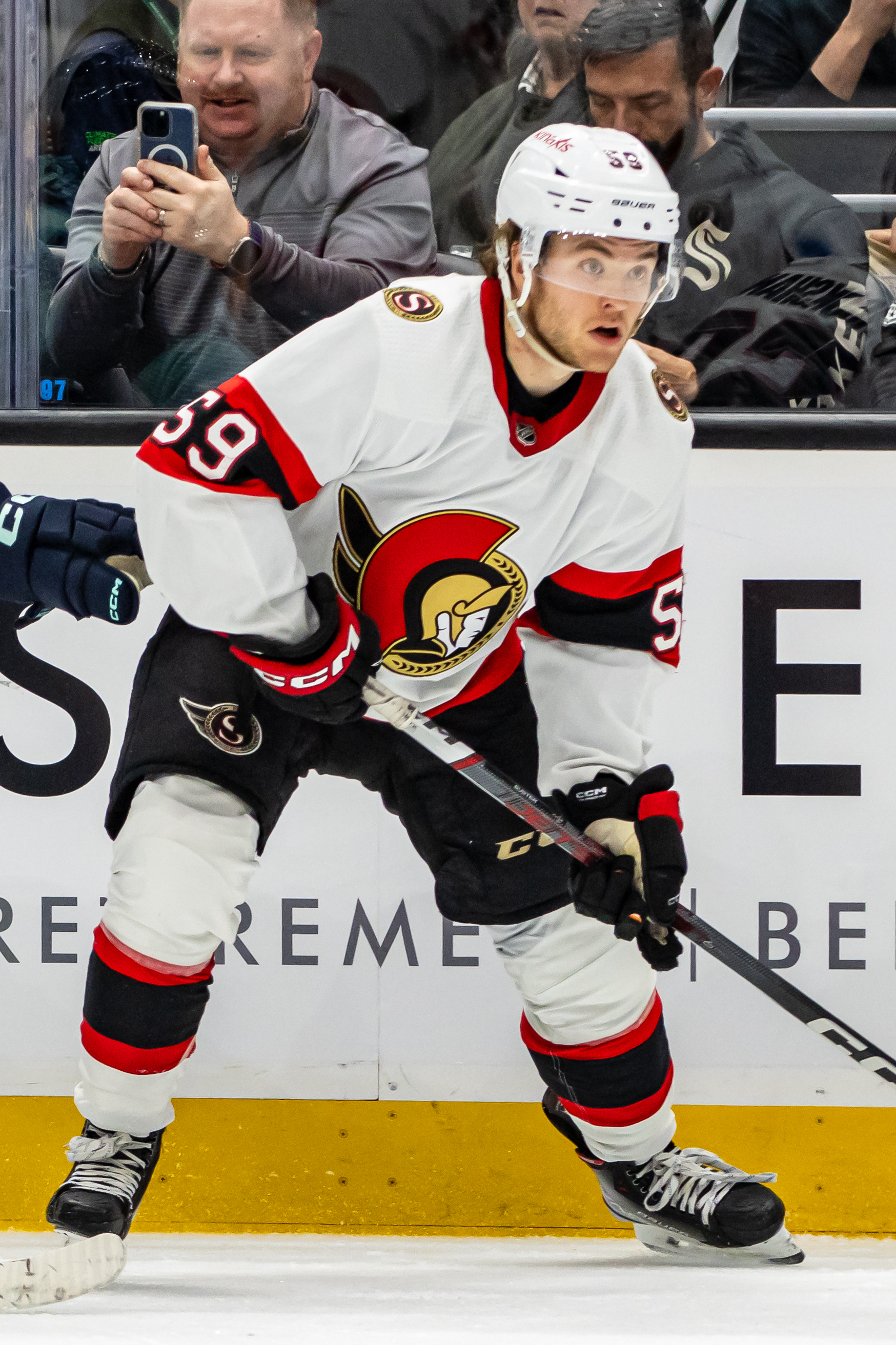
Angus Crookshank was selected 126th overall by the Ottawa Senators.

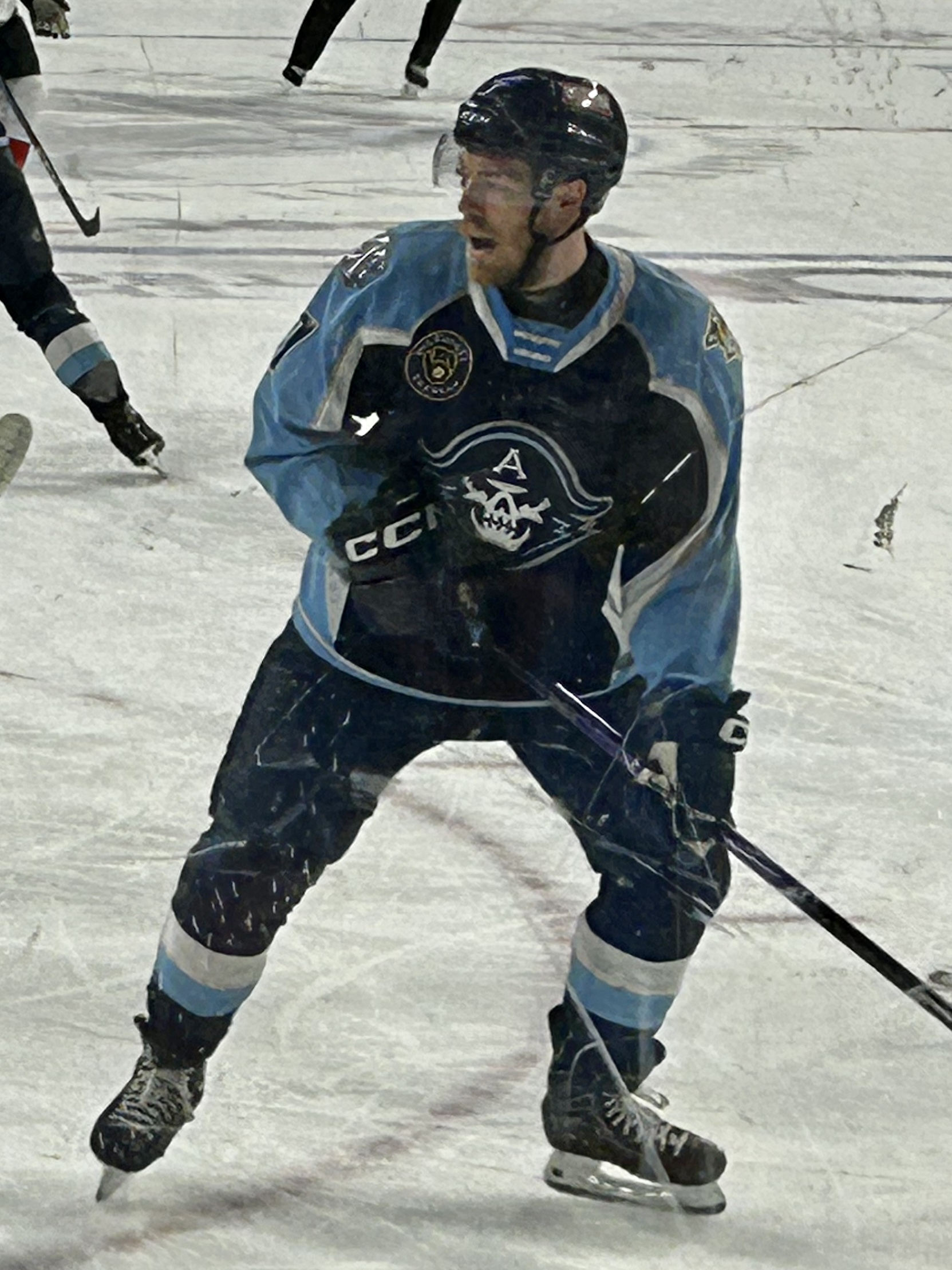
Spencer Stastney was selected 131st overall by the Nashville Predators.

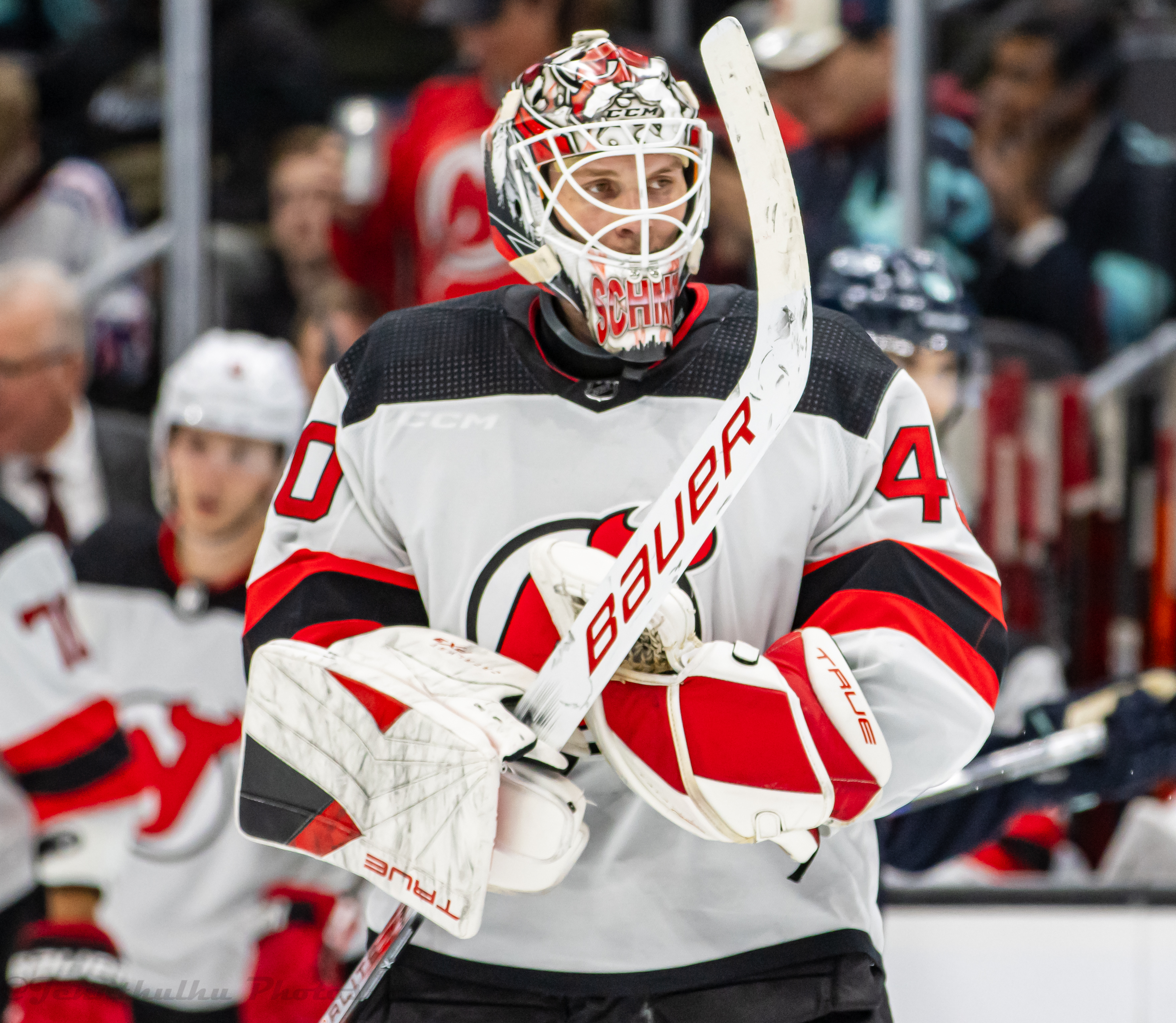
Akira Schmid was selected 136th overall by the New Jersey Devils.

#	Player	Nationality	NHL team	College/junior/club team
125	Miska Kukkonen (D)	Finland	Buffalo Sabres	Ilves U20 (Nuorten SM-liiga)
126	Angus Crookshank (LW)	Canada	Ottawa Senators	Langley Rivermen (BCHL)
127	Wyatte Wylie (D)	United States	Philadelphia Flyers (from Arizona)^{1}	Everett Silvertips (WHL)
128	Cole Fonstad (C)	Canada	Montreal Canadiens	Prince Albert Raiders (WHL)
129	Justin Almeida (C)	Canada	Pittsburgh Penguins (from Detroit)^{2}	Moose Jaw Warriors (WHL)
130	Toni Utunen (D)	Finland	Vancouver Canucks	LeKi (Mestis)
131	Spencer Stastney (D)	United States	Nashville Predators (from Chicago)^{3}	U.S. NTDP (USHL)
132	Lauri Pajuniemi (RW)	Finland	New York Rangers	TPS (Liiga)
133	Samuel Houde (C)	Canada	Montreal Canadiens (from Edmonton)^{4}	Chicoutimi Sagueneens (QMJHL)
134	Blade Jenkins (LW)	United States	New York Islanders	Saginaw Spirit (OHL)
135	Brandon Kruse (LW)	United States	Vegas Golden Knights (from Carolina)^{5}	Bowling Green State University (WCHA)
136	Akira Schmid (G)	Switzerland	New Jersey Devils (from Calgary via Arizona)^{6}	SCL Tigers U20 (Junioren Elite A)
137	Riley Damiani (C)	Canada	Dallas Stars	Kitchener Rangers (OHL)
138	Hugh McGing (LW)	United States	St. Louis Blues	Western Michigan University (NCHC)
139	Mikael Hakkarainen (C)	Finland	Chicago Blackhawks (from Florida via San Jose and Montreal)^{7}	Muskegon Lumberjacks (USHL)
140	Brandon Saigeon (C)	Canada	Colorado Avalanche	Hamilton Bulldogs (OHL)
141	Yegor Sharangovich (C)	Belarus	New Jersey Devils	Dinamo Minsk (KHL)
142	Michael Callahan (D)	United States	Arizona Coyotes (from Columbus via Chicago)^{8}	Youngstown Phantoms (USHL)
143	Samuel Ersson (G)	Sweden	Philadelphia Flyers	Brynas IF J20 (SuperElit)
144	David Hrenak (G)	Slovakia	Los Angeles Kings	St. Cloud State University (NCHC)
145	Dennis Busby (D)	Canada	Arizona Coyotes (from San Jose)^{9}	Flint Firebirds (OHL)
146	Danila Zhuravlyov (D)	Russia	Colorado Avalanche (from Pittsburgh)^{10}	Irbis Kazan (MHL)
147	Roman Durny (G)	Slovakia	Anaheim Ducks	Des Moines Buccaneers (USHL)
148	Simon Johansson (D)	Sweden	Minnesota Wild	Djurgardens IF J20 (SuperElit)
149	Filip Kral (D)	Czech Republic	Toronto Maple Leafs	Spokane Chiefs (WHL)
150	Declan Chisholm (D)	Canada	Winnipeg Jets (from Boston)^{11}	Peterborough Petes (OHL)
151	Vladislav Yeryomenko (D)	Belarus	Nashville Predators	Calgary Hitmen (WHL)
152	Magnus Chrona (G)	Sweden	Tampa Bay Lightning	Nacka HK J18 (J18 Elit)
153	Giovanni Vallati (D)	Canada	Winnipeg Jets	Kitchener Rangers (OHL)
154	Connor Corcoran (D)	Canada	Vegas Golden Knights	Windsor Spitfires (OHL)
155	Damien Giroux (C)	Canada	Minnesota Wild (from Washington)^{12}	Saginaw Spirit (OHL)

Notes

1. The Arizona Coyotes' fifth-round pick went to the Philadelphia Flyers as the result of a trade on June 16, 2017, that sent Nick Cousins and Merrick Madsen to Arizona in exchange for Brendan Warren and this pick.
2. The Detroit Red Wings' fifth-round pick went to the Pittsburgh Penguins as the result of a trade on October 21, 2017, that sent Scott Wilson and a third-round pick in 2018 to Detroit in exchange for Riley Sheahan and this pick.
3. The Chicago Blackhawks' fifth-round pick went to the Nashville Predators as the result of a trade on February 26, 2018, that sent Victor Ejdsell and a first and fourth-round pick both in 2018 to Chicago in exchange for Ryan Hartman and this pick.
4. The Edmonton Oilers' fifth-round pick went to the Montreal Canadiens as the result of a trade on June 23, 2018, that sent Washington's second-round pick in 2018 (62nd overall) to Edmonton in exchange for a third-round pick in 2018 (71st overall) and this pick.
5. The Carolina Hurricanes' fifth-round pick went to the Vegas Golden Knights as the result of a trade on July 4, 2017, that sent Marcus Kruger to Carolina in exchange for this pick.
6. The Calgary Flames' fifth-round pick went to the New Jersey Devils as the result of a trade on October 28, 2017, that sent Scott Wedgewood to Arizona in exchange for this pick.
  Arizona previously acquired this pick as the result of a trade on February 20, 2017, that sent Michael Stone to Calgary in exchange for a third-round pick in 2017 and this pick (being conditional at the time of the trade). The condition – Arizona will receive a fifth-round pick in 2018 if Stone re-signs with Calgary for the 2017–18 NHL season – was converted on June 30, 2017.
7. The Florida Panthers' fifth-round pick went to the Chicago Blackhawks as the result of a trade on June 23, 2018, that sent a fifth-round pick in 2019 to Montreal in exchange for this pick.
  Montreal previously acquired this pick as the result of a trade on June 23, 2018, that sent Edmonton's fourth-round pick in 2018 (102nd overall) to San Jose in exchange for Vegas' fourth-round pick in 2018 (123rd overall) and this pick.
  San Jose previously acquired this pick as the result of a trade on June 19, 2018, that sent Mike Hoffman and a seventh-round pick in 2018 to Florida in exchange for Vegas' fourth-round pick in 2018, a second-round pick in 2019 and this pick.
8. The Columbus Blue Jackets' fifth-round pick went to the Arizona Coyotes as the result of a trade on June 23, 2018, that sent Calgary's third-round pick in 2018 (74th overall) to Chicago in exchange for Toronto's third-round pick in 2018 (87th overall) and this pick.
  Chicago previously acquired this pick as the result of a trade on June 23, 2017, that sent Artemi Panarin, Tyler Motte and the Islanders' sixth-round pick in 2017 to Columbus in exchange for Brandon Saad, Anton Forsberg and this pick.
9. The San Jose Sharks' fifth-round pick went to the Arizona Coyotes as the result of a trade on June 23, 2018, that sent Toronto's third-round pick in 2018 (87th overall) to San Jose in exchange for a fourth-round pick in 2018 (114th overall) and this pick.
10. The Pittsburgh Penguins' fifth-round pick went to the Colorado Avalanche as the result of a trade on June 23, 2018, that sent Nashville's second-round pick in 2018 (58th overall) to Pittsburgh in exchange for Ottawa's third-round pick in 2018 (64th overall) and this pick.
11. The Boston Bruins' fifth-round pick went to the Winnipeg Jets as the result of a trade on March 1, 2017, that sent Drew Stafford to Boston in exchange for this pick (being conditional at the time of the trade). The condition – Winnipeg will receive a fifth-round pick in 2018 if the Bruins reach the 2017 Stanley Cup playoffs and Stafford plays in half of Boston's remaining games in the 2016–17 NHL season – was converted on April 4, 2017.
12. The Washington Capitals' fifth-round pick went to the Minnesota Wild as the result of a trade on June 14, 2017, that sent Tyler Graovac to Washington in exchange for this pick.

=== Round six ===
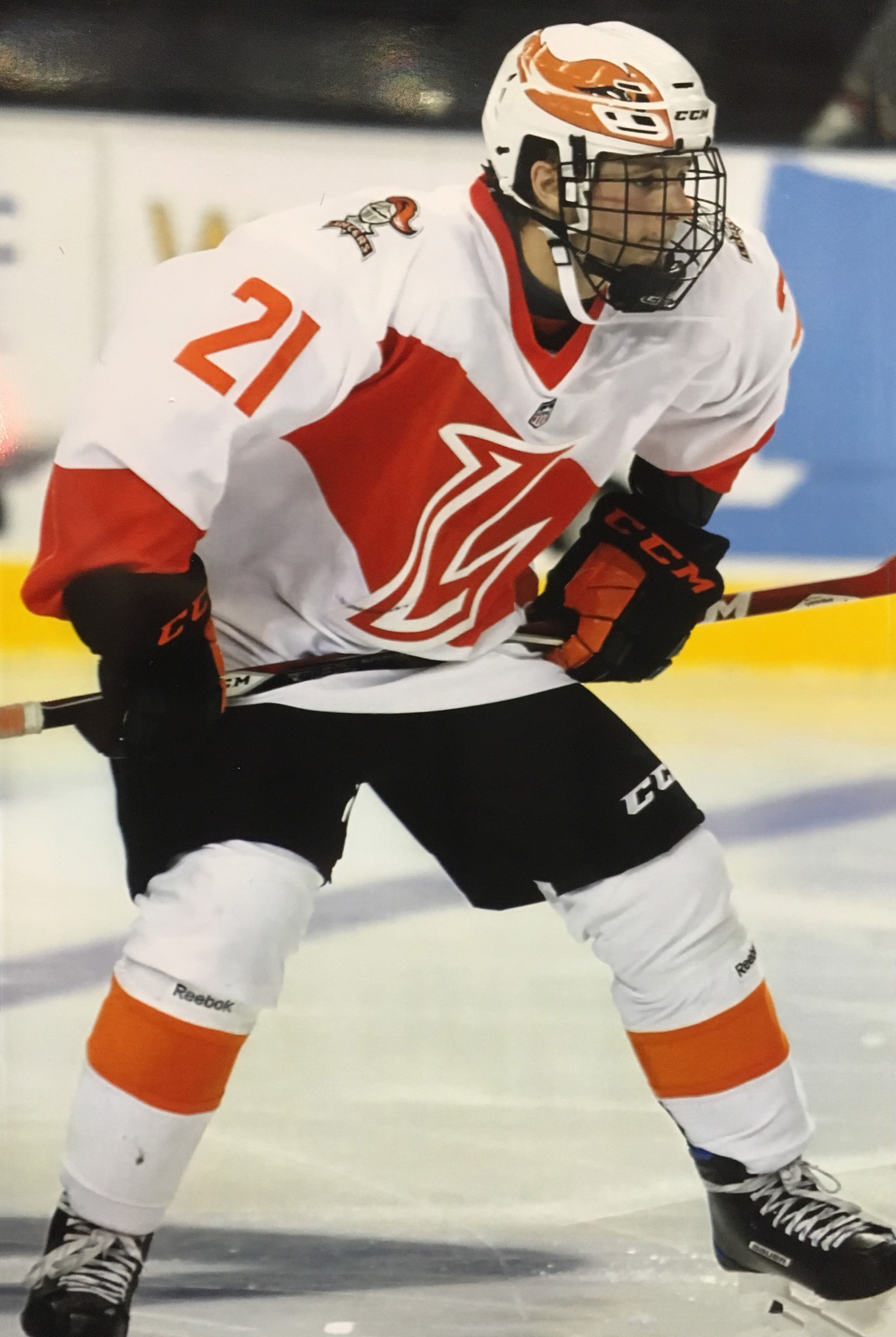
Mathias Emilio Pettersen was selected 167th overall by the Calgary Flames.

#	Player	Nationality	NHL team	College/junior/club team
156	Pontus Holmberg (RW)	Sweden	Toronto Maple Leafs (from Buffalo)^{1}	VIK Vasteras HK (Hockeyettan)
157	Kevin Mandolese (G)	Canada	Ottawa Senators	Cape Breton Screaming Eagles (QMJHL)
158	David Tendeck (G)	Canada	Arizona Coyotes	Vancouver Giants (WHL)
159	Tim Berni (D)	Switzerland	Columbus Blue Jackets (from Montreal via Detroit)^{2}	GCK Lions (NLB)
160	Victor Brattstrom (G)	Sweden	Detroit Red Wings	Timra IK (Allsvenskan)
161	Alex Kannok-Leipert (D)	Canada	Washington Capitals (from Vancouver)^{3}	Vancouver Giants (WHL)
162	Alexis Gravel (G)	Canada	Chicago Blackhawks	Halifax Mooseheads (QMJHL)
163	Simon Kjellberg (D)	Sweden	New York Rangers	Rogle BK J20 (SuperElit)
164	Michael Kesselring (D)	United States	Edmonton Oilers	New Hampton School (USHS)
165	Johan Sodergran (RW)	Sweden	Los Angeles Kings (from NY Islanders)^{4}	Linkopings HC J20 (SuperElit)
166	Jesper Sellgren (D)	Sweden	Carolina Hurricanes	Modo Hockey (Allsvenskan)
167	Mathias Emilio Pettersen (C)	Norway	Calgary Flames	Muskegon Lumberjacks (USHL)
168	Dawson Barteaux (D)	Canada	Dallas Stars	Red Deer Rebels (WHL)
169	Mathias Laferriere (RW)	Canada	St. Louis Blues	Cape Breton Screaming Eagles (QMJHL)
170	Justin Schutz (LW)	Germany	Florida Panthers	Red Bull Hockey Akademie (Czech U18)
171	Nikolai Kovalenko (RW)	Russia	Colorado Avalanche	Loko Yaroslavl (MHL)
172	Mitchell Hoelscher (C)	Canada	New Jersey Devils	Ottawa 67's (OHL)
173	Veini Vehvilainen (G)	Finland	Columbus Blue Jackets	Karpat (Liiga)
174	Gavin Hain (C)	United States	Philadelphia Flyers	U.S. NTDP (USHL)
175	Jacob Ingham (G)	Canada	Los Angeles Kings	Mississauga Steelheads (OHL)
176	Zachary Emond (G)	Canada	San Jose Sharks	Rouyn-Noranda Huskies (QMJHL)
177	Liam Gorman (C)	United States	Pittsburgh Penguins	Saint Sebastian's School (USHS)
178	Hunter Drew (D)	Canada	Anaheim Ducks	Charlottetown Islanders (QMJHL)
179	Shawn Boudrias (RW)	Canada	Minnesota Wild	Gatineau Olympiques (QMJHL)
180	Peter Diliberatore (D)	Canada	Vegas Golden Knights (from Toronto)^{5}	Salisbury School (USHS)
181	Dustyn McFaul (D)	Canada	Boston Bruins	Pickering Panthers (OJHL)
182	John Leonard (LW)	United States	San Jose Sharks (from Nashville)^{6}	UMass Amherst (Hockey East)
183	Cole Koepke (LW)	United States	Tampa Bay Lightning	Sioux City Musketeers (USHL)
184	Jared Moe (G)	United States	Winnipeg Jets	Waterloo Black Hawks (USHL)
185	Xavier Bouchard (D)	Canada	Vegas Golden Knights	Baie-Comeau Drakkar (QMJHL)
186	Artyom Manukyan (RW)	Russia	Vancouver Canucks (from Washington)^{7}	Avangard Omsk (KHL)

Notes

1. The Buffalo Sabres' sixth-round pick went to the Toronto Maple Leafs as the result of a trade on June 23, 2018, that sent Toronto's sixth-round pick in 2019 to Buffalo in exchange for this pick.
2. The Montreal Canadiens' sixth-round pick went to the Columbus Blue Jackets as the result of a trade on June 23, 2018, that sent a fifth-round pick in 2019 to Detroit in exchange for this pick.
  Detroit previously acquired this pick as the result of a trade on February 28, 2017, that sent Steve Ott to Montreal in exchange for this pick.
3. The Vancouver Canucks' sixth-round pick went to the Washington Capitals as the result of a trade on June 23, 2018, that sent a sixth-round pick in 2018 (186th overall) and a sixth-round pick in 2019 to Vancouver in exchange for this pick.
4. The New York Islanders' sixth-round pick went to the Los Angeles Kings as the result of a trade on June 24, 2017, that sent a sixth-round pick in 2017 to New York in exchange for this pick.
5. The Toronto Maple Leafs' sixth-round pick went to the Vegas Golden Knights as the result of a trade on October 6, 2017, that sent Calvin Pickard to Toronto in exchange for Tobias Lindberg and this pick.
6. The Nashville Predators' sixth-round pick went to the San Jose Sharks as the result of a trade on February 25, 2018, that sent Brandon Bollig and Troy Grosenick to Nashville in exchange for this pick.
7. The Washington Capitals' sixth-round pick went to the Vancouver Canucks as the result of a trade on June 23, 2018, that sent a sixth-round pick in 2018 (161st overall) to Washington in exchange for a sixth-round pick in 2019 and this pick.

=== Round seven ===
#	Player	Nationality	NHL team	College/junior/club team
187	William Worge Kreu (D)	Sweden	Buffalo Sabres	Linkopings HC J20 (SuperElit)
188	Jakov Novak (LW)	Canada	Ottawa Senators	Janesville Jets (NAHL)
189	Liam Kirk (LW)	United Kingdom	Arizona Coyotes	Sheffield Steelers (EIHL)
190	Brett Stapley (C)	Canada	Montreal Canadiens (from Montreal via Philadelphia)^{1}	Vernon Vipers (BCHL)
191	Otto Kivenmaki (C)	Finland	Detroit Red Wings	Assat U20 (Nuorten SM-liiga)
192	Matthew Thiessen (G)	Canada	Vancouver Canucks	Steinbach Pistons (MJHL)
193	Josiah Slavin (LW)	United States	Chicago Blackhawks	Lincoln Stars (USHL)
194	Luke Loheit (RW)	United States	Ottawa Senators (from NY Rangers)^{2}	Minnetonka High School (USHS)
195	Patrik Siikanen (C)	Finland	Edmonton Oilers	Blues U20 (Nuorten SM-liiga)
196	Christian Krygier (D)	United States	New York Islanders	Lincoln Stars (USHL)
197	Jacob Kucharski (G)	United States	Carolina Hurricanes	Des Moines Buccaneers (USHL)
198	Dmitry Zavgorodniy (LW)	Russia	Calgary Flames	Rimouski Oceanic (QMJHL)
199	Jermaine Loewen (LW)	Canada	Dallas Stars	Kamloops Blazers (WHL)
200	Tyler Tucker (D)	Canada	St. Louis Blues	Barrie Colts (OHL)
201	Cole Krygier (D)	United States	Florida Panthers	Lincoln Stars (USHL)
202	Shamil Shmakov (G)	Russia	Colorado Avalanche	Sibirskie Snaypery (MHL)
203	Eetu Pakkila (LW)	Finland	New Jersey Devils	Karpat U20 (Nuorten SM-liiga)
204	Trey Fix-Wolansky (RW)	Canada	Columbus Blue Jackets	Edmonton Oil Kings (WHL)
205	Markus Westfalt (C)	Sweden	Philadelphia Flyers	Brynas IF (SHL)
206	Radim Salda (D)	Czech Republic	Tampa Bay Lightning (from Los Angeles)^{3}	Saint John Sea Dogs (QMJHL)
207	Santtu Kinnunen (D)	Finland	Florida Panthers (from San Jose)^{4}	Pelicans U20 (Nuorten SM-liiga)
208	Jordan Kooy (G)	Canada	Vegas Golden Knights (from Pittsburgh)^{5}	London Knights (OHL)
209	Zachary Bouthillier (G)	Canada	Toronto Maple Leafs (from Anaheim)^{6}	Chicoutimi Sagueneens (QMJHL)
210	Sam Hentges (C)	United States	Minnesota Wild	Tri-City Storm (USHL)
211	Semyon Kizimov (RW)	Russia	Toronto Maple Leafs	Ladia Togliatti (MHL)
212	Pavel Shen (C)	Russia	Boston Bruins	Mamonty Yugry (MHL)
213	Milan Kloucek (G)	Czech Republic	Nashville Predators	Dynamo Pardubice (ELH)
214	Ty Taylor (G)	Canada	Tampa Bay Lightning	Vernon Vipers (BCHL)
215	Austin Wong (C)	Canada	Winnipeg Jets	Okotoks Oilers (AJHL)
216	Riley Hughes (RW)	United States	New York Rangers (from Vegas via Carolina)^{7}	Saint Sebastian's School (USHS)
217	Eric Florchuk (C)	Canada	Washington Capitals	Saskatoon Blades (WHL)

Notes

1. The Montreal Canadiens' seventh-round pick was re-acquired as the result of a trade on June 23, 2018, that sent a seventh-round pick in 2019 to Philadelphia in exchange for this pick.
  Philadelphia previously acquired this pick as the result of a trade on June 24, 2017, that sent a seventh-round pick in 2017 to Montreal in exchange for this pick.
2. The New York Rangers' seventh-round pick went to the Ottawa Senators as the result of a trade July 18, 2016, that sent Mika Zibanejad and a second-round pick in 2018 to New York in exchange for Derick Brassard and this pick.
3. The Los Angeles Kings' seventh-round pick went to the Tampa Bay Lightning as the result of a trade on May 31, 2017, that sent Bokondji Imama to Los Angeles in exchange for this pick (being conditional at the time of the trade). The condition – Tampa Bay will receive a seventh-round pick in 2018 if Los Angeles signs Imama prior to the June 1 deadline for drafted CHL players to sign by – was converted.
4. The San Jose Sharks' seventh-round pick went to the Florida Panthers as the result of a trade on June 19, 2018, that sent Vegas' fourth-round pick in 2018, a fifth-round pick in 2018 and a second-round pick in 2019 to San Jose in exchange for Mike Hoffman and this pick.
5. The Pittsburgh Penguins' seventh-round pick went to the Vegas Golden Knights as the result of a trade on June 23, 2018, that sent a seventh-round pick in 2019 to Pittsburgh in exchange for this pick.
6. The Anaheim Ducks' seventh-round pick went to the Toronto Maple Leafs as the result of a trade January 10, 2017, that sent Jhonas Enroth to Anaheim in exchange for this pick.
7. The Vegas Golden Knights' seventh-round pick went to the New York Rangers as the result of a trade on June 23, 2018, that sent Boston's seventh-round pick in 2019 to Carolina in exchange for this pick.
  Carolina previously acquired this pick as the result of a trade on June 22, 2017, that sent Pittsburgh's second-round pick in 2017 to Vegas in exchange for Trevor van Riemsdyk and this pick.

== Draftees based on nationality ==
Rank	Country	Selections	Percent	Top selection
	North America	125	57.6%	
1	Canada	73	33.6%	Barrett Hayton, 5th
2	United States	52	24.0%	Brady Tkachuk, 4th
	Europe	92	42.4%	
3	Sweden	30	13.8%	Rasmus Dahlin, 1st
4	Russia	20	9.2%	Andrei Svechnikov, 2nd
5	Finland	16	7.4%	Jesperi Kotkaniemi, 3rd
6	Czech Republic	11	5.1%	Filip Zadina, 6th
7	Slovakia	5	2.3%	Martin Fehervary, 46th
8	Switzerland	4	1.8%	Nico Gross, 101st
9	Germany	2	0.9%	Dominik Bokk, 25th
9	Belarus	2	0.9%	Yegor Sharangovich, 141st
11	Norway	1	0.5%	Mathias Emilio Pettersen, 167th
11	United Kingdom	1	0.5%	Liam Kirk, 189th

=== North American draftees by state/province ===
Rank	State/province	Selections	Percent	Top selection
1	Ontario	31	14.3%	Barrett Hayton, 5th
2	Quebec	14	6.4%	Nicolas Beaudin, 27th
3	Minnesota	10	4.6%	K'Andre Miller, 22nd
4	Manitoba	8	3.7%	Jett Woo, 37th
4	Michigan	8	3.7%	Bode Wilde, 41st
6	Alberta	6	2.8%	Jacob Bernard-Docker, 26th
6	Massachusetts	6	2.8%	Jake Wise, 69th
6	British Columbia	6	2.8%	Seth Barton, 81st
9	Illinois	5	2.3%	Jack Drury, 42nd
10	Saskatchewan	3	1.4%	Ty Smith, 17th
10	New Jersey	3	1.4%	Mattias Samuelsson, 32nd
10	Nova Scotia	3	1.4%	Jared McIsaac, 36th
10	Wisconsin	3	1.4%	Ty Emberson, 73rd
14	New York	2	0.9%	Joel Farabee, 14th
14	California	2	0.9%	Slava Demin, 99th
14	Pennsylvania	2	0.9%	Mitchell Gibson, 124th
17	Missouri	1	0.5%	Brady Tkachuk, 4th
17	Florida	1	0.5%	Quinn Hughes, 7th
17	Maine	1	0.5%	Oliver Wahlstrom, 11th
17	Prince Edward Island	1	0.5%	Noah Dobson, 12th
17	Texas	1	0.5%	Ryan O'Reilly, 98th
17	Oregon	1	0.5%	Jasper Weatherby, 102nd
17	North Carolina	1	0.5%	Tyler Weiss, 109th
17	Washington	1	0.5%	Wyatte Wylie, 127th
17	New Hampshire	1	0.5%	Michael Kesselring, 164th
17	Colorado	1	0.5%	Josiah Slavin, 193rd

== See also ==
- 2015–16 NHL transactions
- 2016–17 NHL transactions
- 2017–18 NHL transactions
- 2018–19 NHL transactions
- 2018–19 NHL season
- List of first overall NHL draft picks
- List of NHL players
